= 2016 NACAC Under-23 Championships in Athletics – Results =

These are the results of the 2016 NACAC Under-23 Championships in Athletics which took place from July 15 to 17 at the Estadio Jorge "Mágico" González in San Salvador, El Salvador.

== Men's results ==
=== 100 meters ===
Heats – July 15
Wind:
Heat 1: -2.2 m/s, Heat 2: -2.0 m/s, Heat 3: -2.1 m/s

Rank	Heat	Name	Nationality	Time	Notes
1	3	Cejhae Greene	Antigua and Barbuda	10.37	Q
2	1	Andre Azonwanna	Canada	10.46	Q
2	2	Kendal Williams	United States	10.46	Q
4	1	Stanly del Carmen	Dominican Republic	10.47	Q
5	3	Levi Cadogan	Barbados	10.51	Q
6	3	Christopher Valdez	Dominican Republic	10.55	q
7	1	Ajamu Graham	Jamaica	10.58	q
7	2	Tadashi Pinder	Bahamas	10.58	Q
9	3	Holland Cabara	Trinidad and Tobago	10.60	
10	1	Juan Carlos Alanis	Mexico	10.61	
11	2	Jared Jarvis	Antigua and Barbuda	10.62	
12	2	Kevaun Rattray	Jamaica	10.63	
13	3	Fred Dorsey	United States Virgin Islands	10.73	
14	1	Ian Kerr	Bahamas	10.75	
15	2	Duan Asemota	Canada	10.87	
16	2	Steve Mathurin	Costa Rica	10.88	
17	1	Shaquoy Stephens	British Virgin Islands	10.95	
18	2	Reberto Boyde	Saint Vincent and the Grenadines	11.02	
19	3	Jamal Adams	Saint Kitts and Nevis	11.05	
20	1	Juan Carlos Rodríguez	El Salvador	11.21	
21	3	Hector Allen	Costa Rica	11.27	
22	2	José Braghieri	El Salvador	11.31	
23	1	James Bregal	Belize	11.42	
	3	Reuberth Boyde	Saint Vincent and the Grenadines	DNF	

Final – July 15
Wind:
-0.9 m/s

Rank	Lane	Name	Nationality	Time	Notes
1st place, gold medalist(s)	3	Kendal Williams	United States	10.23	
2nd place, silver medalist(s)	5	Stanly del Carmen	Dominican Republic	10.37	10.361
3rd place, bronze medalist(s)	2	Levi Cadogan	Barbados	10.37	10.365
4	7	Christopher Valdez	Dominican Republic	10.55	
5	1	Tadashi Pinder	Bahamas	10.59	
6	8	Ajamu Graham	Jamaica	10.68	
	6	Cejhae Greene	Antigua and Barbuda	DQ	
	4	Andre Azonwanna	Canada	DQ	

=== 200 meters ===
Heats – July 17
Wind:
Heat 1: +0.6 m/s, Heat 2: +0.7 m/s, Heat 3: +1.6 m/s

Rank	Heat	Name	Nationality	Time	Notes
1	3	Reynier Mena	Cuba	20.88	Q
2	2	Stanly del Carmen	Dominican Republic	20.96	Q
3	2	Renard Howell	Jamaica	20.97	Q
4	1	Levi Cadogan	Barbados	21.09	Q
5	3	Ian Kerr	Bahamas	21.09	Q
6	3	Devin Jenkins	United States	21.11	q
7	1	Juan Carlos Alanis	Mexico	21.16	Q
8	2	Fredrick Kerley	United States	21.17	q
9	2	Klye Webb	Bermuda	21.28	
10	2	Anthony Adderley	Bahamas	21.33	
11	3	Brandon Valentine-Parris	Saint Vincent and the Grenadines	21.36	
12	1	Yaniel Carrero	Cuba	21.48	
13	3	Christopher Valdez	Dominican Republic	21.63	
14	3	Steve Mathurin	Costa Rica	21.71	
15	2	Jamal Adams	Saint Kitts and Nevis	21.80	
16	2	Reberto Boyde	Saint Vincent and the Grenadines	22.04	
17	1	Shaquoy Stephens	British Virgin Islands	22.12	
18	2	Hector Allen	Costa Rica	22.45	
19	3	Juan Carlos Rodríguez	El Salvador	22.53	
20	1	José Braghieri	El Salvador	22.55	
	1	Tahir Walsh	Antigua and Barbuda	DQ	R163.3
	1	James Bregal	Belize	DNS	
	3	Rayshaun Franklin	Canada	DNS	

Final – July 17
Wind:
+0.8 m/s

Rank	Name	Nationality	Time	Notes
1st place, gold medalist(s)	Reynier Mena	Cuba	20.41	
2nd place, silver medalist(s)	Stanly del Carmen	Dominican Republic	20.51	
3rd place, bronze medalist(s)	Ian Kerr	Bahamas	20.83	
4	Levi Cadogan	Barbados	20.86	
5	Juan Carlos Alanis	Mexico	20.95	
6	Devin Jenkins	United States	21.06	
7	Renard Howell	Jamaica	21.45	
	Fredrick Kerley	United States	DNS	

=== 400 meters ===
Heats – July 15

Rank	Heat	Name	Nationality	Time	Notes
1	3	Nathon Allen	Jamaica	46.46	Q
2	1	Michael Cherry	United States	46.52	Q
3	1	Warren Hazel	Saint Kitts and Nevis	46.65	Q
4	3	Nathan George	Canada	46.81	Q
5	3	Stephen Newbold	Bahamas	46.81	q
6	3	Khari Herbert	British Virgin Islands	46.84	q
7	3	Franklin Luis	Dominican Republic	46.85	
8	1	Brandon Valentine-Parris	Saint Vincent and the Grenadines	47.04	
9	2	Dontavius Wright	United States	47.04	Q
10	2	Klye Webb	Bermuda	47.58	Q
11	2	Janeko Cartwright	Bahamas	47.65	
12	1	Martin Manley	Jamaica	47.76	
13	1	Sherman Guity	Costa Rica	48.14	
13	2	Andito Charles	Dominican Republic	48.14	
15	3	Zinedine Selis	Costa Rica	48.18	
16	2	Joshua Cunningham	Canada	48.25	
17	1	Ronald Moreno	El Salvador	48.84	
18	2	Benjamin Fairweather	Belize	50.59	
19	1	Hance Card	Belize	51.68	
	2	Pablo Ibañez	El Salvador	DNS	

Final – July 16

Rank	Lane	Name	Nationality	Time	Notes
1st place, gold medalist(s)	4	Nathon Allen	Jamaica	45.39	
2nd place, silver medalist(s)	5	Michael Cherry	United States	45.50	
3rd place, bronze medalist(s)	6	Warren Hazel	Saint Kitts and Nevis	45.81	NR
4	3	Dontavius Wright	United States	46.14	
5	2	Stephen Newbold	Bahamas	46.27	
6	8	Nathan George	Canada	46.54	
7	1	Khari Herbert	British Virgin Islands	46.55	
8	7	Klye Webb	Bermuda	46.92	

=== 800 meters ===
Heats – July 16

Rank	Heat	Name	Nationality	Time	Notes
1	1	Chris Sanders	United States	1:49.34	Q
2	1	Alexander Smart	Canada	1:50.40	Q
3	2	Isaiah Harris	United States	1:51.40	Q
4	2	Corey Bellemore	Canada	1:51.72	Q
5	2	Mark London	Trinidad and Tobago	1:52.08	Q
6	2	Wade Garner	Barbados	1:52.38	q
7	1	Nicholas Landeau	Trinidad and Tobago	1:52.45	Q
8	2	Zinedine Selis	Costa Rica	1:52.59	q
9	1	Josué Murcia	Costa Rica	1:53.25	
10	1	Dage Minors	Bermuda	1:53.32	
11	1	Ronald Moreno	El Salvador	1:55.69	
12	2	Erik Hernández	El Salvador	1:58.85	

Final – July 17

Rank	Name	Nationality	Time	Notes
1st place, gold medalist(s)	Isaiah Harris	United States	1:47.52	
2nd place, silver medalist(s)	Chris Sanders	United States	1:47.77	
3rd place, bronze medalist(s)	Corey Bellemore	Canada	1:47.88	
4	Alexander Smart	Canada	1:48.90	
5	Nicholas Landeau	Trinidad and Tobago	1:50.44	
6	Wade Garner	Barbados	1:52.02	
7	Mark London	Trinidad and Tobago	1:53.20	
8	Zinedine Selis	Costa Rica	1:53.45	

=== 1500 meters ===
July 15

Rank	Name	Nationality	Time	Notes
1st place, gold medalist(s)	Henry Wynne	United States	3:51.81	
2nd place, silver medalist(s)	Mike Tate	Canada	3:51.91	
3rd place, bronze medalist(s)	Thomas Awad	United States	3:54.51	
4	Georman Rivas	Costa Rica	4:00.23	
5	Dage Minors	Bermuda	4:01.25	
6	César Peraza	El Salvador	4:01.98	
7	José Maravilla	El Salvador	4:10.38	
8	Victor Santana	Puerto Rico	4:29.48	
9	Zhyon Geerman	Aruba	4:52.56	

=== 5000 meters ===
July 16

Rank	Name	Nationality	Time	Notes
1st place, gold medalist(s)	Patrick Corona	United States	15:18.26	
2nd place, silver medalist(s)	Sydney Gidabuday	United States	15:21.16	
3rd place, bronze medalist(s)	Alberto González	Guatemala	15:31.17	
4	David Escobar	El Salvador	15:42.14	
5	Zhyon Geerman	Aruba	18:47.91	
	Walter Yac	Guatemala	DNS	
	Ronal Monterrosa	El Salvador	DNS	

=== 10,000 meters ===
July 15

Rank	Name	Nationality	Time	Notes
1st place, gold medalist(s)	Erik Peterson	United States	30:28.74	
2nd place, silver medalist(s)	Ian La Mere	United States	30:33.68	
3rd place, bronze medalist(s)	Alberto González	Guatemala	31:41.60	
	Ronal Monterrosa	El Salvador	DNF	
	Walter Yac	Guatemala	DNF	

=== 110 meters hurdles ===
July 16
Wind: -0.3 m/s (Note: Initial race winner Will Barnes with a time of 13.53 (13.527) was later disqualified due to an anti-doping rules violation.)

Rank	Name	Nationality	Time	Notes
1st place, gold medalist(s)	Freddie Crittenden	United States	13.53	13.528
2nd place, silver medalist(s)	Aaron Malett	United States	13.67	13.665
3rd place, bronze medalist(s)	Tyler Mason	Jamaica	13.67	13.669
4	Ruebin Walters	Trinidad and Tobago	13.71	
5	Rohan Cole	Jamaica	13.75	
6	Salvador García	Mexico	13.91	
7	Tramaine Maloney	Barbados	14.18	

=== 400 meters hurdles ===
Heats – July 16

Rank	Heat	Name	Nationality	Time	Notes
1	2	Khallifah Rosser	United States	50.57	Q
2	1	Mica-Jonathan Petit-Homme	Haiti	50.67	Q
3	2	Juander Santos	Dominican Republic	51.02	Q
4	1	José Luis Gaspar	Cuba	51.10	Q
5	1	Robert Grant	United States	51.14	Q
5	2	Gerald Drummond	Costa Rica	51.14	Q
5	2	Marvin Williams	Jamaica	51.14	q
8	1	Andre Colebrooke	Bahamas	51.35	q
9	2	Khalil Parris	Canada	51.41	
10	1	Daniel Brady	Canada	51.93	
11	2	Oniel Thomas	Saint Kitts and Nevis	52.52	
12	1	Emmanuel Niño	Costa Rica	54.02	
13	2	René Perla	El Salvador	54.60	
	1	Jorell Bellafonte	Cayman Islands	DNF	
	1	Kion Joseph	Barbados	DNF	

Final – July 17

Rank	Name	Nationality	Time	Notes
1st place, gold medalist(s)	Khallifah Rosser	United States	49.25	
2nd place, silver medalist(s)	José Luis Gaspar	Cuba	49.92	
3rd place, bronze medalist(s)	Juander Santos	Dominican Republic	50.02	
4	Mica-Jonathan Petit-Homme	Haiti	50.51	
5	Robert Grant	United States	51.08	
6	Marvin Williams	Jamaica	51.77	
7	Andre Colebrooke	Bahamas	51.85	
8	Gerald Drummond	Costa Rica	53.02	

=== 3000 meters steeplechase ===
July 17

Rank	Name	Nationality	Time	Notes
1st place, gold medalist(s)	Antoine Thibeault	Canada	8:55.96	
2nd place, silver medalist(s)	Michael Erb	United States	9:12.25	
3rd place, bronze medalist(s)	Brandon Allen	Canada	9:18.81	
4	César Peraza	El Salvador	9:38.54	
5	Juan Francisco Feliz	Dominican Republic	9:53.87	
6	David Escobar	El Salvador	10:18.34	
	Bryce Miller	United States	DNF	
	José Enrique Calvo	Costa Rica	DQ	R169.7

=== 4 × 100 meters relay ===
July 16

Rank	Nation	Competitors	Time	Notes
1st place, gold medalist(s)	United States	Devin Jenkins, Christian Coleman, Kendal Williams, Fredrick Kerley	38.63	
2nd place, silver medalist(s)	Jamaica	Ajamu Graham, Nathon Allen, Rohan Cole, Renard Howell	39.25	
3rd place, bronze medalist(s)	Bahamas	Anthony Adderley, Tadashi Pinder, Stephen Newbold, Ian Kerr	39.85	
4	Dominican Republic	Christopher Valdez, Juander Santos, Stanly del Carmen, Andito Charles	39.97	
5	Canada	Andre Azonwanna, Rayshaun Franklin, Joshua Cunningham, Duan Asemota	40.55	
6	Costa Rica	Cristian Arias, Sherman Guity, Hector Allen, Steve Mathurin	41.80	
7	El Salvador	Rene Perla, Ronald Moreno, José Braghieri, Juan Carlos Rodríguez	42.26	
8	Belize	Ezhay Cayetano, Martin Flowers, Hance Card, James Bregal	43.85	

=== 4 × 400 meters relay ===
July 17

Rank	Nation	Competitors	Time	Notes
1st place, gold medalist(s)	United States	Dontavius Wright, Robert Grant, Khallifah Rosser, Michael Cherry	3:00.89	
2nd place, silver medalist(s)	Jamaica	Twayne Crooks, Martin Manley, Keeno Burrell, Nathon Allen	3:04.11	
3rd place, bronze medalist(s)	Bahamas	Maverick Bowleg, Ashley Riley, Janeko Cartwright, Stephen Newbold	3:04.74	
4	Canada	Joshua Cunningham, Khalil Parris, Corey Bellemore, Nathan George	3:05.93	
	Costa Rica		DNS	
	El Salvador		DNS	

=== 20,000 meters walk ===
July 17

Rank	Name	Nationality	Time	Notes
1st place, gold medalist(s)	José Alejandro Barrondo	Guatemala	1:34:32.01	
2nd place, silver medalist(s)	Anthony Peters	United States	1:35:04.77	
3rd place, bronze medalist(s)	Gerson Navas	El Salvador	1:35:24.48	
4	Óscar Menjivar	El Salvador	1:39:07.63	
5	Steven Washburn	United States	1:46:21.86	

=== High jump ===
July 17

Rank	Name	Nationality	1.90	1.95	2.00	2.05	2.10	2.13	2.16	2.19	2.22	2.29	Result	Notes
1st place, gold medalist(s)	Avion Jones	United States	–	–	–	o	–	xo	o	–	xxo	xxx	2.22	
2nd place, silver medalist(s)	Hiawatha Culver	United States	–	o	–	o	o	o	o	xxo	xxx		2.19	
3rd place, bronze medalist(s)	Alhaji Mansaray	Canada	–	–	–	xo	xo	xo	xxx				2.13	
4	Matthew Campbell	Jamaica	–	–	o	o	xxx						2.05	
4	Kareem Roberts	Trinidad and Tobago	–	–	o	o	xxx						2.05	
6	Sean Cate	Canada	–	–	xo	o	xxx						2.05	
7	Christoff Bryan	Jamaica	–	–	o	xo	xxx						2.05	
8	Ken Franzua	Guatemala	o	o	o	xxx							2.00	
	Aaron Gumbs	Anguilla	xxx										NM	

=== Pole vault ===
July 15

Rank	Name	Nationality	4.00	4.10	4.20	4.70	4.80	4.90	5.00	5.10	5.20	5.57	Result	Notes
1st place, gold medalist(s)	Devin King	United States	–	–	–	–	–	–	o	xo	–	xxx	5.10	
2nd place, silver medalist(s)	Jorge Luna	Mexico	–	–	–	o	–	o	xxo	xo	xxx		5.10	
3rd place, bronze medalist(s)	Abbey Alcon	Dominican Republic	–	–	–	–	–	xxo	–	xxx			4.90	
4	Natán Rivera	El Salvador	–	–	–	xxo	–	xxx					4.70	
5	Edward Cruz	El Salvador	xxo	xxo	xxx								4.10	
	José Nales	Puerto Rico	–	–	–	–	xxx						NM	
	Audie Wyatt	United States	–	–	–	–	–	–	xxx				NM	

=== Long jump ===
July 15

Rank	Name	Nationality	#1	#2	#3	#4	#5	#6	Result	Notes
1st place, gold medalist(s)	Ifeanyichukwu Otuonye	Turks and Caicos Islands	7.72	7.71w	x	7.72	7.78w	7.88	7.88	
2nd place, silver medalist(s)	Jonathan Addison	United States	7.53	7.63w	7.80	7.79	x	x	7.80	
3rd place, bronze medalist(s)	KeAndre Bates	United States	7.38	7.37	7.76	7.39	7.77	7.15	7.77	
4	Nathaniel Huggins	Saint Kitts and Nevis	7.37w	7.27	7.00	6.92	7.27w	6.04w	7.37w	
5	Fred Dorsey	United States Virgin Islands	7.10	x	x	7.06	7.16	7.29	7.29	
6	Nicolas Arriola	Guatemala	7.07	x	7.26w	7.03	6.99	x	7.26w	
7	Aubrey Allen	Jamaica	7.13w	x					7.13w	
8	Ángel Suarez	Nicaragua	6.86w	6.74	x	x	6.97	x	6.97	
9	Cristian Arias	Costa Rica	6.48	6.56	6.53				6.56	
10	Richard Crick	Saint Vincent and the Grenadines	6.46w	x	5.97				6.46w	
11	Martin Flowers	Belize	6.10w	x	5.66				6.10w	
12	Ezhay Cayetano	Belize	5.76w	x	x				5.76w	
13	Darren Wiafe-Morson	Montserrat	x	4.67					4.67	

=== Triple jump ===
July 17

Rank	Name	Nationality	#1	#2	#3	#4	#5	#6	Result	Notes
1st place, gold medalist(s)	Eric Sloan	United States	15.76	15.81	x	15.72	16.15	15.90	16.15	
2nd place, silver medalist(s)	Lathone Collie	Bahamas	15.69	13.80	x	x	15.80	15.70	15.80	
3rd place, bronze medalist(s)	Jeremiah Green	United States	x	x	15.04	x	x	x	15.04	
4	Ángel Suarez	Nicaragua	13.69	14.38	14.89	14.36	x	x	14.89	
5	Richard Crick	Saint Vincent and the Grenadines	x	x	13.53	x	13.89	x	13.89	

=== Shot put ===
July 17

Rank	Name	Nationality	#1	#2	#3	#4	#5	#6	Result	Notes
1st place, gold medalist(s)	Braheme Days Jr.	United States	18.59	18.76	19.36	x	x	x	19.36	
2nd place, silver medalist(s)	Josh Freeman	United States	18.78	19.27	x	18.79	x	19.00	19.27	
3rd place, bronze medalist(s)	Eldred Henry	British Virgin Islands	18.00	18.15	19.11	17.42	18.25	19.01	19.11	
4	Vashon McCarthy	Jamaica	17.44	17.65	17.10	17.55	17.18	17.84	17.84	
5	Felipe Valencia	Mexico	16.58	16.67	17.36	17.78	17.50	x	17.78	
6	Hezekiel Romeo	Trinidad and Tobago	17.47	17.60	x	17.43	17.44	x	17.60	
7	Peter Millman	Canada	x	x	17.05	16.90	x	x	17.05	
8	Warren Barrett	Jamaica	17.03	16.78	x	x	x	x	17.03	
9	Elijah Pawliw	Canada	16.20	x	x				16.20	
10	Shervorne Worrell	Trinidad and Tobago	15.26	16.00	14.92				16.00	
11	Hugo Gonzáles	Guatemala	14.26	x	x				14.26	

=== Discus throw ===
July 15

Rank	Name	Nationality	#1	#2	#3	#4	#5	#6	Result	Notes
1st place, gold medalist(s)	Brian Williams	United States	57.80	58.00	55.90	57.30	x	55.95	58.00	
2nd place, silver medalist(s)	Sam Mattis	United States	53.95	56.60	57.40	57.35	x	53.10	57.40	
3rd place, bronze medalist(s)	Eldred Henry	British Virgin Islands	52.85	56.45	x	x	x	54.05	56.45	
4	Basil Bingham	Jamaica	52.20	51.05	52.05	49.15	48.65	48.20	52.20	
5	Glenford Watson	Jamaica	50.45	50.40	49.25	49.45	50.25	50.85	50.85	
6	Drexel Maycock	Bahamas	50.50	48.30	48.45	49.75	49.10	x	50.50	
7	Ever Acajabón	Guatemala	40.27	42.15	x	x	38.90	41.40	42.15	
8	Enrique Martínez	El Salvador	x	37.30	37.10	38.45	36.55	34.75	38.45	
9	Gerardo Flores	El Salvador	36.30	35.48	31.30				36.30	

=== Hammer throw ===
July 16

Rank	Name	Nationality	#1	#2	#3	#4	#5	#6	Result	Notes
1st place, gold medalist(s)	Diego del Real	Mexico	x	74.55	x	73.18	x	73.51	74.55	CR
2nd place, silver medalist(s)	Rudy Winkler	United States	68.86	70.52	x	73.00	x	69.67	73.00	
3rd place, bronze medalist(s)	Alexander Young	United States	x	64.23	67.43	63.73	63.81	x	67.43	
4	Kevin Linares	El Salvador	47.12	52.16	x	51.24	51.66	52.11	52.16	
5	Enrique Martínez	El Salvador	x	48.00	x	x	x	x	48.00	

=== Javelin throw ===
July 16

Rank	Name	Nationality	#1	#2	#3	#4	#5	#6	Result	Notes
1st place, gold medalist(s)	Curtis Thompson	United States	72.63	79.28	77.41	x	73.73	77.07	79.28	
2nd place, silver medalist(s)	David Carreon	Mexico	71.30	73.43	75.80	72.25	75.70	76.25	76.25	
3rd place, bronze medalist(s)	Janeil Craigg	Barbados	71.18	x	x	70.45	75.62	67.93	75.62	
4	Shakeil Waithe	Trinidad and Tobago	71.28	72.99	75.09	72.61	x	x	75.09	
5	Damian Odle	United States	59.89	63.84	68.82	64.58	69.85	72.44	72.44	
6	John Krzyszkowski	Canada	66.67	69.94	68.47	x	69.51	65.98	69.94	
7	Evan Karakolis	Canada	63.30	68.78	x	x	x	x	68.78	
8	Adrian Williams	Saint Kitts and Nevis	x	x	60.64	62.10	x	63.98	63.98	
9	Orlando Thomas	Jamaica	59.30	60.12	x				60.12	

=== Decathlon ===
July 16–17

The highest mark recorded in each event is highlighted in yellow

Rank	Name	Nationality	100m	LJ	SP	HJ	400m	110m H	DT	PV	JT	1500m	Points	Notes
1st place, gold medalist(s)	Rostam Turner	Canada	11.08	7.03	13.11	1.91	48.97	15.85	45.40	4.60	57.60	4:43.28	7601	CR
2nd place, silver medalist(s)	Cody Walton	United States	11.13	6.93	12.73	1.91	49.62	15.02	40.65	4.60	59.63	5:05.69	7409	
3rd place, bronze medalist(s)	Zachary Bornstein	Canada	11.21	6.73	13.89	1.79	49.83	15.76	45.30	4.00	54.17	4:46.26	7169	
4	Ronald Ramírez	Guatemala	11.42	6.77	12.80	1.97	54.65	14.88	35.60	3.60	51.70	5:37.98	6497	
5	André Campos	Costa Rica	11.39	6.62	9.94	1.82	51.86	17.07	33.10	3.50	39.91	5:00.78	6497	
6	Youssef Qasem	Guatemala	11.81	5.87	7.35	1.70	56.45	16.28	24.95	NM	44.36	5:03.97	4773	

== Women's results ==
=== 100 meters ===
Heats – July 15
Wind:
Heat 1: -1.2 m/s, Heat 2: -1.6 m/s

Rank	Heat	Name	Nationality	Time	Notes
1	2	Sashalee Forbes	Jamaica	11.55	Q
2	1	Shayla Sanders	United States	11.56	Q
3	2	Carmiesha Cox	Bahamas	11.81	Q
4	1	Leya Buchanan	Canada	11.84	Q
5	2	Shamelle Pless	Canada	11.96	Q
6	1	Tayla Carter	Bahamas	12.02	Q
7	2	Marileidy Paulino	Dominican Republic	12.02	q
8	1	Taylor Hill	British Virgin Islands	12.09	q
9	2	Sharolyn Josephs	Costa Rica	12.15	
10	2	Iza Flores	Mexico	12.23	
11	1	Shavonne Husbands	Barbados	12.32	
12	1	Dania Aguillón	Mexico	12.33	
13	1	Glenda Davis	Costa Rica	12.67	
14	1	Ajahney Carr	Belize	13.50	
15	2	Jada Parchue	Belize	13.87	

Final – July 15
Wind:
-2.0 m/s

Rank	Lane	Name	Nationality	Time	Notes
1st place, gold medalist(s)	3	Sashalee Forbes	Jamaica	11.51	
2nd place, silver medalist(s)	6	Shayla Sanders	United States	11.52	
3rd place, bronze medalist(s)	4	Carmiesha Cox	Bahamas	11.76	
4	5	Leya Buchanan	Canada	11.83	
5	7	Marileidy Paulino	Dominican Republic	11.98	
6	2	Shamelle Pless	Canada	11.99	
7	8	Taylor Hill	British Virgin Islands	12.04	
8	1	Tayla Carter	Bahamas	12.07	

=== 200 meters ===
Heats – July 17
Wind:
Heat 1: -0.6 m/s, Heat 2: -0.7 m/s

Rank	Heat	Name	Nationality	Time	Notes
1	2	Kali Davis-White	Jamaica	23.21	Q
2	2	Arialis Gandulla	Cuba	23.90	Q
3	1	Robin Reynolds	United States	23.91	Q
4	2	Medeleine Price	Canada	23.92	Q
5	1	Iza Flores	Mexico	24.34	Q
6	1	Leya Buchanan	Canada	24.36	Q
7	1	Carmiesha Cox	Bahamas	24.43	q
7	2	Marileidy Paulino	Dominican Republic	24.43	q
9	1	Shavonne Husbands	Barbados	24.48	
10	2	Dania Aguillón	Mexico	24.55	
11	2	Andrea Vargas	Costa Rica	25.18	
12	2	Ajahney Carr	Belize	27.67	
	1	Glenda Davis	Costa Rica	DNS	
	1	Taylor Hill	British Virgin Islands	DNS	

Final – July 17
Wind:
+2.6 m/s

Rank	Name	Nationality	Time	Notes
1st place, gold medalist(s)	Kali Davis-White	Jamaica	22.66	
2nd place, silver medalist(s)	Arialis Gandulla	Cuba	23.36	
3rd place, bronze medalist(s)	Robin Reynolds	United States	23.40	
4	Medeleine Price	Canada	23.85	
5	Iza Flores	Mexico	23.86	
6	Marileidy Paulino	Dominican Republic	24.00	
7	Leya Buchanan	Canada	24.78	
	Carmiesha Cox	Bahamas	DNS	

=== 400 meters ===
Heats – July 15

Rank	Heat	Name	Nationality	Time	Notes
1	2	Chrisann Gordon	Jamaica	51.50	Q
2	1	Shakima Wimbley	United States	52.24	Q
3	2	Jaide Stepter	United States	52.44	Q
4	1	Sonikqua Walker	Jamaica	53.01	Q
5	2	Domonique Williams	Trinidad and Tobago	53.17	Q
6	1	Sonia Gaskin	Barbados	53.70	Q
7	1	Parris García	Puerto Rico	53.94	q
8	2	Medeleine Price	Canada	54.00	q
9	1	Jonel Lacey	British Virgin Islands	56.52	
10	2	María Murillo	Costa Rica	57.73	
11	1	Lisseth Ramirez	Costa Rica	59.77	

Final – July 16

Rank	Lane	Name	Nationality	Time	Notes
1st place, gold medalist(s)	6	Chrisann Gordon	Jamaica	51.02	CR
2nd place, silver medalist(s)	3	Jaide Stepter	United States	52.51	
3rd place, bronze medalist(s)	4	Sonikqua Walker	Jamaica	52.69	
4	8	Medeleine Price	Canada	53.71	
5	7	Parris García	Puerto Rico	53.76	
6	5	Shakima Wimbley	United States	54.71	
7	2	Sonia Gaskin	Barbados	54.86	
	1	Domonique Williams	Trinidad and Tobago	DQ	

=== 800 meters ===
July 17

Rank	Name	Nationality	Time	Notes
1st place, gold medalist(s)	Lisneydis Veitia	Cuba	2:02.02	CR
2nd place, silver medalist(s)	Jenna Westaway	Canada	2:03.90	
3rd place, bronze medalist(s)	Sahily Diago	Cuba	2:04.20	
4	Raevyn Rogers	United States	2:04.78	
5	Samantha James	Jamaica	2:08.04	
6	Olivia Baker	United States	2:08.77	
7	Sonia Gaskin	Barbados	2:10.63	
8	Maïté Bouchard	Canada	2:12.20	
9	Viviana Arroche	Guatemala	2:22.36	
10	Lisseth Ramírez	Costa Rica	2:27.21	

=== 1500 meters ===
July 15

Rank	Name	Nationality	Time	Notes
1st place, gold medalist(s)	Jenna Westaway	Canada	4:16.03	
2nd place, silver medalist(s)	Mary Cain	United States	4:16.86	
3rd place, bronze medalist(s)	Regan Yee	Canada	4:19.16	
4	Amina Banks	United States	4:20.90	
5	Angelin Figueroa	Puerto Rico	4:36.20	
6	Viviana Arroche	Guatemala	4:50.71	
7	Valeria Martínez	Nicaragua	4:54.09	
8	Irma Aldana	El Salvador	5:06.22	

=== 5000 meters ===
July 17

Rank	Name	Nationality	Time	Notes
1st place, gold medalist(s)	Lauren La Rocco	United States	16:57.27	
2nd place, silver medalist(s)	Angelin Figueroa	Puerto Rico	18:36.88	
3rd place, bronze medalist(s)	Wendy Ascencio	El Salvador	19:15.88	
4	Mónica López	El Salvador	21:14.53	

=== 10,000 meters ===
July 16

Rank	Name	Nationality	Time	Notes
1st place, gold medalist(s)	Chelsea Blaase	United States	35:30.87	CR
2nd place, silver medalist(s)	Olivia Pratt	United States	36:17.28	
3rd place, bronze medalist(s)	Wendy Ascencio	El Salvador	40:17.85	
4	Mónica López	El Salvador	43:36.86	

=== 100 meters hurdles ===
Heats – July 16
Wind:
Heat 1: -0.6 m/s, Heat 2: -0.7 m/s

Rank	Heat	Name	Nationality	Time	Notes
1	1	Pedrya Seymour	Bahamas	12.84	Q
1	2	Jasmine Camacho-Quinn	Puerto Rico	12.84	Q
3	1	Ebony Morrison	United States	13.16	Q
4	2	Alexis Perry	United States	13.18	Q
5	2	Akela Jones	Barbados	13.36	Q
6	1	Nicole Setterington	Canada	13.43	Q
7	1	Andrea Vargas	Costa Rica	13.60	q
8	2	Chrisdale McCarthy	Jamaica	13.88	q
9	1	Mariaqueta Rodríguez	Mexico	13.99	
10	2	Deshaunda Morrison	Canada	14.35	

Final – July 16
Wind:
-1.5 m/s

Rank	Lane	Name	Nationality	Time	Notes
1st place, gold medalist(s)	4	Jasmine Camacho-Quinn	Puerto Rico	12.78	CR
2nd place, silver medalist(s)	6	Pedrya Seymour	Bahamas	12.83	
3rd place, bronze medalist(s)	5	Alexis Perry	United States	13.12	
4	7	Akela Jones	Barbados	13.29	
5	3	Ebony Morrison	United States	13.32	
6	2	Andrea Vargas	Costa Rica	13.65	
7	8	Nicole Setterington	Canada	13.74	
8	1	Chrisdale McCarthy	Jamaica	13.76	

=== 400 meters hurdles ===
July 17

Rank	Name	Nationality	Time	Notes
1st place, gold medalist(s)	Kiah Seymour	United States	56.19	
2nd place, silver medalist(s)	Autumn Franklin	United States	56.36	
3rd place, bronze medalist(s)	Tia-Adana Belle	Barbados	57.16	
4	Zurian Hechavarría	Cuba	57.17	
5	Taysia Radoslav	Canada	58.78	
6	Ranae McKenzie	Jamaica	58.85	

=== 3000 meters steeplechase ===
July 16

Rank	Name	Nationality	Time	Notes
1st place, gold medalist(s)	Regan Yee	Canada	10:38.79	
2nd place, silver medalist(s)	Paige Kouba	United States	10:38.84	
3rd place, bronze medalist(s)	Irma Aldana	El Salvador	12:05.43	

=== 4 × 100 meters relay ===
July 16

Rank	Nation	Competitors	Time	Notes
1st place, gold medalist(s)	United States	Robin Reynolds, Shayla Sanders, Deanna Hill, Ebony Morrison	42.93	CR
2nd place, silver medalist(s)	Jamaica	Chanice Bonner, Kali Davis-White, Sashalee Forbes, Sonikqua Walker	43.63	
3rd place, bronze medalist(s)	Bahamas	Pedrya Seymour, Tayla Carter, Danielle Gibson, Carmiesha Cox	45.17	
4	Canada	Deshaunda Morrison, Leya Buchanan, Nicole Setterington, Shamelle Pless	46.72	
5	Costa Rica	María Murillo, Sharolyn Josephs, Daneysha Robinson, Glenda Davis	47.89	

=== 4 × 400 meters relay ===
July 16

Rank	Nation	Competitors	Time	Notes
1st place, gold medalist(s)	United States	Carly Muscaro, Jaide Stepter, Kiah Seymour, Shakima Wimbley	3:28.45	
2nd place, silver medalist(s)	Jamaica	Sonikqua Walker, Dawnlee Lonely, Samantha James, Chrisann Gordon	3:32.06	
3rd place, bronze medalist(s)	Canada	Taysia Radoslav, Jenna Westaway, Medeleine Price, Maïté Bouchard	3:44.45	

=== 10,000 meters walk ===
July 17

Rank	Name	Nationality	Time	Notes
1st place, gold medalist(s)	Yesenia Miranda	El Salvador	49:24.70	CR
2nd place, silver medalist(s)	Molly Josephs	United States	53:34.86	
3rd place, bronze medalist(s)	Karin Vicente	Guatemala	55:09.10	
4	Jennifer Lopez	United States	58:29.16	

=== High jump ===
July 15

Rank	Name	Nationality	1.60	1.70	1.75	1.78	1.81	1.84	1.87	1.91	1.94	Result	Notes
1st place, gold medalist(s)	Akela Jones	Barbados	–	o	o	xo	o	xo	xo	xo	xxx	1.91	CR
2nd place, silver medalist(s)	Loretta Blaut	United States	–	o	xo	o	o	xxx				1.81	
3rd place, bronze medalist(s)	Georgia Ellenwood	Canada	–	o	xo	xxo	xxx					1.78	
4	Rachel McCoy	United States	–	xo	xo	xxx						1.75	
	Abigail Obando	Costa Rica	xxx									NM	

=== Pole vault ===
July 16

Rank	Name	Nationality	3.30	3.50	3.70	3.80	4.25	4.40	4.55	Result	Notes
1st place, gold medalist(s)	Megan Clark	United States	–	–	–	–	o	o	xxx	4.40	=CR
2nd place, silver medalist(s)	Yaritza Diaz	Puerto Rico	o	xo	o	xxx				3.70	

=== Long jump ===
July 17

Rank	Name	Nationality	#1	#2	#3	#4	#5	#6	Result	Notes
1st place, gold medalist(s)	Quanesha Burks	United States	x	5.94	x	6.41	6.69	6.74	6.74	CR
2nd place, silver medalist(s)	Akela Jones	Barbados	6.03	6.36	6.43	6.56	6.56	6.74	6.74	CR
3rd place, bronze medalist(s)	Alexis Perry	United States	6.46	x	6.38	6.10	6.66	6.19	6.66	
4	Shanice Porter	Jamaica	6.27	6.19	6.10	6.26	6.27	6.37	6.37	
5	Georgia Ellenwood	Canada	x	x	5.78	x	5.79	x	5.79	
6	Tissanna Hickling	Jamaica	5.56	5.70	5.50	5.68	5.48	x	5.70	
7	Daneysha Robinson	Costa Rica	5.11	4.84	4.27	4.88	4.96	5.07	5.11	
8	María Reneé Gómez	El Salvador	4.57	x	4.60	4.63			4.63	

=== Triple jump ===
July 17

Rank	Name	Nationality	#1	#2	#3	#4	#5	#6	Result	Notes
1st place, gold medalist(s)	Dannielle Gibson	Bahamas	13.39	12.98	13.46	13.54	x	13.17	13.54	
2nd place, silver medalist(s)	Simone Charley	United States	12.98	x	13.47	13.50	13.43	13.17	13.50	
3rd place, bronze medalist(s)	Danielle McQueen	United States	12.49	x	12.60	x	x	12.98	12.98	
4	Shardia Lawrence	Jamaica	x	12.63	12.87	12.73	12.95	x	12.95	
5	Tissanna Hickling	Jamaica	12.34	12.68	x	x	x	x	12.68	
	Khadijah Clouden	United States Virgin Islands	x	x	x				NM	

=== Shot put ===
July 16

Rank	Name	Nationality	#1	#2	#3	#4	#5	#6	Result	Notes
1st place, gold medalist(s)	Raven Saunders	United States	17.61	x	x	18.49	x	18.41	18.49	CR
2nd place, silver medalist(s)	Sahily Viart	Cuba	15.92	16.64	17.42	x	17.10	16.98	17.42	
3rd place, bronze medalist(s)	Erin Farmer	United States	15.53	16.43	16.24	x	x	16.36	16.43	
4	Itohan Aikhionbare	Belize	14.06	x	15.48	16.20	16.02	15.65	16.20	
5	Jess St. John	Antigua and Barbuda	15.38	15.50	15.08	x	14.22	x	15.50	
6	Portious Warren	Trinidad and Tobago	15.00	14.64	15.31	14.70	15.13	14.81	15.31	
7	Trevia Gumbs	British Virgin Islands	11.94	12.35	13.53	x	x	x	13.53	
8	Debora Melara	El Salvador	10.59	10.94	9.83	10.45	10.93	10.63	10.94	

=== Discus throw ===
July 15

Rank	Name	Nationality	#1	#2	#3	#4	#5	#6	Result	Notes
1st place, gold medalist(s)	Shelbi Vaughan	United States	48.85	57.20	x	x	55.80	x	57.20	CR
2nd place, silver medalist(s)	Tera Novy	United States	55.70	54.45	x	52.20	x	x	55.70	
3rd place, bronze medalist(s)	Agnes Esser	Canada	51.50	x	48.75	x	49.20	x	51.50	
4	Isheka Binns	Jamaica	x	x	36.60	49.45	47.85	x	49.45	
5	Latoya Gilding	Trinidad and Tobago	39.35	38.40	41.25	42.95	41.80	39.40	42.95	
6	Tynelle Gumbs	British Virgin Islands	42.75	40.35	41.60	42.80	42.30	x	42.80	
7	Alma Gutierrez	Honduras	37.15	35.90	36.65	x	38.55	37.35	38.55	
8	Debora Melara	El Salvador	30.30	30.95	31.90	30.50	x	x	31.90	
	Trevia Gumbs	British Virgin Islands	x	x	x				NM	

=== Hammer throw ===
July 15

Rank	Name	Nationality	#1	#2	#3	#4	#5	#6	Result	Notes
1st place, gold medalist(s)	Becky Famurewa	United States	59.06	59.90	x	x	x	61.03	61.03	
2nd place, silver medalist(s)	Monique Griffiths	United States	54.93	60.21	x	x	x	57.56	60.21	
3rd place, bronze medalist(s)	Agnes Esser	Canada	57.06	56.05	x	56.60	58.44	57.55	58.44	
4	Natasha Akbarizadeh	Canada	52.89	53.85	x	53.82	52.79	56.60	56.60	
5	Tynelle Gumbs	British Virgin Islands	x	48.65	x	50.24	53.80	x	53.80	
6	Ann Dagrin	Haiti	x	x	49.41	x	x	x	49.41	
7	Sonja Moreno	Guatemala	41.09	46.86	42.54	x	x	x	46.86	
8	Trevia Gumbs	British Virgin Islands	45.11	45.39	x	46.76	x	x	46.76	
9	María Soto	El Salvador	42.20	x	x				42.20	
10	Debora Melara	El Salvador	36.12	35.50	35.44				36.12	

=== Javelin throw ===
July 17

Rank	Name	Nationality	#1	#2	#3	#4	#5	#6	Result	Notes
1st place, gold medalist(s)	Yulenmis Aguilar	Cuba	53.37	x	57.09	51.92	54.76	57.09	57.09	
2nd place, silver medalist(s)	Sarah Firestone	United States	51.69	53.96	x	51.34	51.59	53.96	53.96	
3rd place, bronze medalist(s)	Jessie Merckle	United States	52.13	50.32	53.28	49.70	50.91	53.28	53.28	
4	Olivia Leckford Marshall	Jamaica	44.19	50.13	x	44.52	x	50.13	50.13	
5	Idania Vanessa Abarca	El Salvador	32.51	33.06	x	x	31.16	33.06	33.06	

=== Heptathlon ===
July 15–16

The highest mark recorded in each event is highlighted in yellow

Rank	Name	Nationality	100m H	HJ	SP	200m	LJ	JT	800m	Points	Notes
1st place, gold medalist(s)	Taliyah Brooks	United States	13.64	1.74	11.02	24.78	6.12	36.99	2:31.36	5609	
2nd place, silver medalist(s)	Clairwin Dameus	United States	14.09	1.50	10.05	25.12	6.22	31.29	2:31.71	5087	
3rd place, bronze medalist(s)	Lyxandra Geerman	Aruba	16.14	1.50	8.87	26.59	5.16	24.91	2:47.13	3998	
4	Karla Molina	El Salvador	16.42	NM	8.21	28.77	5.07	28.44	2:38.85	3259	
