= 2011 CARIFTA Games =

XL CARIFTA Games
- Dates: April 23–25
- Host city: Montego Bay, Jamaica
- Venue: Montego Bay Sports Complex
- Level: Junior and Youth
- Events: 66 (35 junior (incl. 4 open), 31 youth)
- Participation: about 453 (238 junior, 215 youth) athletes from 27 nations
- Records set: 8 games records

The 40th CARIFTA Games was held at the Montego Bay Sports Complex in Montego Bay, Jamaica, on April 23–25, 2011. Initially, the games should be hosted for the second time after 2007 by Saint Kitts and Nevis, but they declared to be unable to stage the games because of financial issues. The games could have been cancelled for the first time in its history, but Jamaica finally agreed to host the games at short notice.

Detailed reports on the results were given.

== Records ==
A total of 8 new games records were set.

Event	Record	Athlete	Country	Type
Boys Under 20 (Junior)
Shot Put	19.47m	Ashinia Miller	Jamaica	CR
Javelin Throw	72.04m	Keshorn Walcott	Trinidad and Tobago	CR
Girls Under 20 (Junior)
200 m	22.93s (1.1 m/s) (heat)	Anthonique Strachan	Bahamas	CR=
4 × 100 m relay	44.08s	Christania Williams; Deandre Whitehorne; Celia Walters; Shericka Jackson	Jamaica	CR
4 × 400 m relay	3:31.47	Olivia James; Janieve Russell; Simoya Campbell; Chrisann Gordon	Jamaica	CR
Boys Under 17 (Youth)
800 m	1:51.79	Jerrard Mason	Barbados	CR
Shot Put	17.42m	Christopher Brown	Jamaica	CR
Javelin Throw	60.15m	Adrian Williams	Saint Kitts and Nevis	CR

Key

AR — Area record • CR — Championship record • NR — National record

== Austin Sealy Award ==
The Austin Sealy Trophy for the most outstanding athlete of the games was awarded to Anthonique Strachan of the Bahamas. She won two gold medals (100 m, and 200 m) in the junior (U-20) category equalling Veronica Campbell's 200 metres games record.

== Medal summary ==
Complete results can be found on the games' website and on the World Junior Athletics History website.

=== Boys under 20 (Junior) ===
Event	Gold		Silver		Bronze	
100 metres (−0.2 m/s)	Jahazeel Murphy (JAM)	10.27	Kemar Bailey-Cole (JAM)	10.28	Shavez Hart (BAH)	10.51
200 metres (−0.2 m/s)	Delano Williams (TCA)	21.04	Moriba Morain (TRI)	21.05	Odail Todd (JAM)	21.08
400 metres	O'Jay Ferguson (BAH)	46.49	Javere Bell (JAM)	46.89	Stephen Newbold (BAH)	47.32
800 metres	Anthonio Mascoll (BAR)	1:50.21	Shaquille Dill (BER)	1:50.90	Mark London (TRI)	1:53.80
1500 metres	Matthew Wright (BAR)	3:58:89	James Audley Carey (BAH)	4:03.07	Ibrahim Hinds (BAR)	4:04.38
5000 metres	Khari Bowen (JAM)	15:07.58	Matthew Wright (BAR)	15:29.59	Oraine Wint (JAM)	15:35.47
110 metres hurdles (−0.8 m/s)	Stefan Fennell (JAM)	13.79	Tyrell Forde (BAR)	13.89	Omar McLeod (JAM)	14.10
400 metres hurdles	Omar McLeod (JAM)	52.42	Brandon Benjamin (TRI)	53.22	Tramaine Maloney (BAR)	53.48
High jump	Domanique Missick (TCA)	2.15	Ryan Ingraham (BAH)	2.10	Quentin Siberi (CUR)	2.00
Pole vault	Xavier Boland (JAM)	4.40	Shem Edwards (LCA)	4.40	Kazuma Davis (JAM)	4.00
Long jump	Genard Paul (GRN)	7.19 (−0.2 m/s)	Clive Pullen (JAM)	7.15 (−0.6 m/s)	Charles Greaves (BAR)	7.11 (−0.3 m/s)
Triple jump	Elton Walcott (TRI)	15.98 (−1.9 m/s)	Lathone Collie-Minns (BAH)	15.24 (−0.5 m/s)	(Martinique) /Jean-Noël Cretinoir (MTQ)	14.82 (−1.0 m/s)
Shot put	Ashinia Miller (JAM)	19.47 CR	Travis Smikle (JAM)	18.58	Akeem Stewart (TRI)	16.86
Discus throw	Travis Smikle (JAM)	62.84	Akeem Stewart (TRI)	51.50	Kellon Alexis (GRN)	50.60
Javelin throw	Keshorn Walcott (TRI)	72.04 CR	Emron Gibbs (GRN)	63.57	Nicholia Bovell (BAR)	58.42
Heptathlon	Kemar Jones (BAR)	4662	Andell Joseph (GRN)	4581	Lindon Toussaint (GRN)	4544
4 × 100 metres relay	Jamaica; Odail Todd; Kemar Bailey-Cole; Kemarley Brown; Jahazeel Murphy	39.75	Trinidad and Tobago; Jonathan Holder; Moriba Morain; Ayodele Taffe; Jamol James	39.91	Bahamas; Shavez Hart; Trevorvano Mackey; Laron Hield; Stephen Newbold	40.29
4 × 400 metres relay	Trinidad and Tobago; Jereem Richards; Hendrix Foncette; Deon Lendore; Darvin Sandy	3:08:96	Jamaica; Javere Bell; Rusheen McDonald; Omar McLeod; Brian Smith	3:09:41	Barbados; Tramaine Maloney; Anthonio Mascoll; Nikolai Gall; Shaquille Alleyne	3:14:06

: Open event for both junior and youth athletes.

=== Girls under 20 (Junior) ===
Event	Gold		Silver		Bronze	
100 metres (−0.8 m/s)	Anthonique Strachan (BAH)	11.38	Michelle-Lee Ahye (TRI)	11.44	Christania Williams (JAM)	11.52
200 metres (0.0 m/s)	Anthonique Strachan (BAH)	23.17	Shericka Jackson (JAM)	23.48	Celia Walters (JAM)	24.26
400 metres	Olivia James (JAM)	52.64	Chrisann Gordon (JAM)	52.74	Afia Charles (ATG)	54.23
800 metres	Simoya Campbell (JAM)	2:08.77	Sonia Gaskin (BAR)	2:11.69	Dawnell Collymore (TRI)	2:12.79
1500 metres	Shantal Duncan (JAM)	4:41.61	(Guadeloupe) /Magalie Penelope (GLP)	4:42.65	Hughnique Rolle (BAH)	4:43.97
3000 metres	Hughnique Rolle (BAH)	10:27:32	Ashley Berry (BER)	10:44:24	Kendra Richards (GRN)	10:56:28
100 metres hurdles (0.5 m/s)	Chrisdale McCarthy (JAM)	13.97	Sade-Mariah Greenidge (BAR)	14.00	Kenrisha Brathwaite (BAR)	14.15
400 metres hurdles	Janieve Russell (JAM)	57.71	Katrina Seymour (BAH)	58.04	Kernesha Spann (TRI)	59.19
High jump	Peta-Gaye Reid (JAM)	1.78	Thea LaFond (DMA)	1.75	Jeanelle Scheper (LCA)	1.70
Long jump	Chanice Porter (JAM)	6.12 (0.2 m/s)	Nickevea Wilson (JAM)	5.86 (−0.4 m/s)	(Guadeloupe) /Karene Rebus (GLP)	5.74 (−0.7 m/s)
Triple jump	Nickevea Wilson (JAM)	12.83 (−2.4 m/s)	Tamara Myers (BAH)	12.35 (−1.5 m/s)	Thea LaFond (DMA)	12.30 (−2.0 m/s)
Shot put	(Guadeloupe) /Laurianne Laurendot (GLP)	13.80	Kellion Knibb (JAM)	13.79	Edlyn Edgecombe (ATG)	12.93
Discus throw	Sasha-Gaye Marston (JAM)	45.26	Kellion Knibb (JAM)	42.49	Leah Bannister (BAR)	38.09
Javelin throw	(French Guiana) /Alexie Alaïs (GUF)	47.24	Kellion Knibb (JAM)	45.38	(Martinique) /Myriam Sacama-Isidore (MTQ)	42.15
Pentathlon	(Martinique) /Audilia da Veiga (MTQ)	3769	Devinn Cartwright (BAH)	3380	Gleneve Grange (JAM)	3321
4 × 100 metres relay	Jamaica; Christania Williams; Deandre Whitehorne; Celia Walters; Shericka Jackson	44.08 CR	Trinidad and Tobago; Breanna Gomes; Michelle-Lee Ahye; Gabriela Cumberbatch; Kai Selvon	45.80		
4 × 400 metres relay	Jamaica; Olivia James; Janieve Russell; Simoya Campbell; Chrisann Gordon	3:31.47 CR	Trinidad and Tobago; Kernesha Spann; Chelsi Campbell; Marrissa Gale; Domonique Williams	3:39.88	Bahamas; Katrina Seymour; Ashley Johnson; Devinn Cartwright; Shaunae Miller	3:41.05

: Open event for both junior and youth athletes.

=== Boys under 17 (Youth) ===
Event	Gold		Silver		Bronze	
100 metres (−0.4 m/s)	Delano Davis (BAH)	10.75	Jevaughn Minzie (JAM)	10.81	Nicholas Douglas (TRI)	10.87
200 metres (−0.3 m/s)	Machel Cedenio (TRI)	21.43	Jevaughn Minzie (JAM)	21.60	Delano Davis (BAH)	21.76
400 metres	Machel Cedenio (TRI)	47.38	Theon Lewis (TRI)	48.14	Jerrard Mason (BAR)	48.20
800 metres	Jerrard Mason (BAR)	1:51.79 CR	Ashley Riley (BAH)	1:53.57	Kevon Robinson (JAM)	1:54:55
1500 metres	Nicholas Landeau (TRI)	4:04.84	Jorel Bellafonte (CAY)	4:09.19	Marbeq Edgar (LCA)	4:09.90
3000 metres	Nicholas Landeau (TRI)	8:47.05	Rochini Vorstwijk (SUR)	9:14.89	Dage Minors (BER)	9:15.21
110 metres hurdles (−0.2 m/s)	(Guadeloupe) /Wilhem Belocian (GLP)	13.75	Tyler Mason (JAM)	13.98	Michael Ohara (JAM)	14.24
400 metres hurdles	Dario Scantlebury (BAR)	54.23	D'Mitry Charlton (BAH)	54.98	Jahvere Worrell (BAR)	55.42
High jump	Christoff Bryan (JAM)	2.10	Norris Bain (BAH)	1.90	Torino Samuel (SKN)	1.85
Long jump	Trae Carey (BAH)	7.01 (0.0 m/s)	Bruce DeGrilla (BER)	6.94 (−0.7 m/s)	Shammar Rock (BAR)	6.80 (−0.7 m/s)
Triple jump	Shammar Rock (BAR)	13.63 (−2.4 m/s)	Anthony Pratt (BAH)	13.49 (−1.4 m/s)	Justin Donawa (BER)	13.47 (−1.0 m/s)
Shot put	Christopher Brown (JAM)	17.42 CR	Shervorne Worrell (TRI)	15.28	Kenejah Williams (TRI)	15.05
Discus throw	Shervorne Worrell (TRI)	46.60	Kenejah Williams (TRI)	44.80	Romario Antoine (BAR)	42.34
Javelin throw	Adrian Williams (SKN)	60.15 CR	Denzil St. Marthe (LCA)	58.91	J'Anthon Silliday (SKN)	55.01
4 × 100 metres relay	Jamaica; Raheem Robinson; Jevaughn Minzie; Tyler Mason; Rohan Walker	40.92	Trinidad and Tobago; Ron Wright; Jonathan Farinha; Machel Cedenio; Nicholas Douglas	41.13	Bahamas; Tommy Outten; Delano Davis; Kirk Lewis; Lorman Johnson	41.75
4 × 400 metres relay	Jamaica; Khadeesh Willis; Jevaughn Minzie; Keniel Harrison; Julanie Walker	3:15.19	Trinidad and Tobago; Theon Lewis; Jonathan Farinha; Asa Guevara; Machel Cedenio	3:15.35	Bahamas; Janeko Cartwright; Ashley Riley; Renaldo Tinker; Kinard Rolle	3:17.78

=== Girls under 17 (Youth) ===
Event	Gold		Silver		Bronze	
100 metres (−3.4 m/s)	Devynne Charlton (BAH)	11.91	Shauna Helps (JAM)	11.95	Nelda Huggins (BVI)	11.98
200 metres (0.0 m/s)	Carmiesha Cox (BAH)	23.96	Jonielle Smith (JAM)	24.14	Luan Gabriel (DMA)	24.25
400 metres	Yanique McNeil (JAM)	54.27	Kissi-Ann Brown (JAM)	54.73	(Guadeloupe) /Sareena Carti (GLP)	54.90
800 metres	Cindy Forde (BAR)	2:14:66	Aleitha McLaughlin (JAM)	2:14.75	Lisa Buchanan (JAM)	2:17.09
1500 metres	Lisa Buchanan (JAM)	4:43.88	Cindy Forde (BAR)	4:49.71	Faheema Scraders (BER)	4:52.55
100 metres hurdles (0.0 m/s)	Yanique Thompson (JAM)	13.76	Shakera Hall (BAR)	13.82	Peta-Gaye Williams (JAM)	14.01
300 metres hurdles	Peta-Gaye Williams (JAM)	41.55	Kimone Green (JAM)	41.85	Pedrya Seymour (BAH)	42.66
High jump	Akela Jones (BAR)	1.75	Krista-Gay Taylor (JAM)	1.70	Sharien Gijsbertha (CUR)	1.70
Long jump	Akela Jones (BAR)	5.66 (1.2 m/s)	Claudette Allen (JAM)	5.61 (−1.9 m/s)	Dannielle Gibson (BAH)	5.53 (0.3 m/s)
Triple jump	(Guadeloupe) /Yannis David (GLP)	11.78 (1.9 m/s)	Shardia Lawrence (JAM)	11.78 w (3.6 m/s)	(French Guiana) /Larissa Galas (GUF)	11.59 (−3.6 m/s)
Shot put	Gleneve Grange (JAM)	12.38	Winmalcia Bowen (BAR)	11.56	Shareday Curiel (CUR)	11.29
Discus throw	Gleneve Grange (JAM)	40.98	Paul-Ann Gayle (JAM)	38.88	Marielle Pierre (TRI)	34.57
Javelin throw	Gleneve Grange (JAM)	35.36	Chelsey Linton (DMA)	33.98	Akidah Briggs (TRI)	33.74
4 × 100 metres relay	Jamaica; Yanique Thompson; Chanice Bonner; Shauna Helps; Jonielle Smith	45.75	Bahamas; Devynne Charlton; Jasmine Walker; Makeya White; Carmiesha Cox	46.16	Trinidad and Tobago; Zakiya Denoon; Janae Alexander; Kayelle Clarke; Tsai-Ann Joseph	47.37
4 × 400 metres relay	Jamaica; Kissi Ann Brown; Yanique McNeil; Kimone Green; Peta-Gaye Williams	3:41.33	Barbados; Akela Taylor; Tia-Adana Belle; Erica Charles; Cindy Forde	3:44.61	Bahamas; Juanae Lewis; Dreshanae Rolle; Eyeiessa Darville; Pedrya Seymour	3:50.18

== Medal table (unofficial) ==
* Host nation (Jamaica)

Rank	Nation	Gold	Silver	Bronze	Total
1	Jamaica*	32	23	11	66
2	Barbados	9	8	11	28
3	Trinidad and Tobago	8	12	9	29
4	Bahamas	8	11	11	30
5	Guadeloupe	3	1	2	6
6	Turks and Caicos Islands	2	0	0	2
7	Grenada	1	2	3	6
8	Martinique	1	0	2	3
8	Saint Kitts and Nevis	1	0	2	3
10	French Guiana	1	0	1	2
11	Bermuda	0	3	3	6
12	Dominica	0	2	2	4
12	Saint Lucia	0	2	2	4
14	Cayman Islands	0	1	0	1
14	Suriname	0	1	0	1
16	Curaçao	0	0	3	3
17	Antigua and Barbuda	0	0	2	2
18	British Virgin Islands	0	0	1	1
Totals (18 entries)		66	66	65	197

== Participation (unofficial) ==
Detailed result lists can be found on the games' website and on the World Junior Athletics History website. An unofficial count yields the number of about 453 athletes (238 junior (under-20) and 215 youth (under-17)) from about 27 countries. The lists contain the names of 12 athletes assigned to the Netherlands Antilles. Rather, after its dissolution in October 2010, teams from two successor states were participating: nine athletes from Curaçao, and three from Sint Maarten.

There athletes from French Saint Martin were aksi part of the team from Guadeloupe.

- Anguilla (3)
- Antigua and Barbuda (10)
- Aruba (5)
- Bahamas (62)
- Barbados (41)
- Belize (1)
- Bermuda (33)
- British Virgin Islands (8)
- Cayman Islands (8)
- Curaçao (9)
- Dominica (10)
- /French Guiana (9)
- Grenada (19)
- /Guadeloupe (19)
- Guyana (5)
- Haiti (7)
- Jamaica (71)
- /Martinique (16)
- Montserrat (2)
- Saint Kitts and Nevis (9)
- Saint Lucia (10)
- Saint Vincent and the Grenadines (4)
- Sint Maarten (3)
- Suriname (8)
- Trinidad and Tobago (61)
- Turks and Caicos Islands (16)
- U.S. Virgin Islands (4)
