= Kellion Knibb =

Jamaican discus thrower

Personal information
- Born: 25 December 1993 (age 32) St. Catherine, Jamaica
- Education: Florida State University
- Height: 1.83 m (6 ft 0 in)
- Weight: 86 kg (190 lb)

Sport
- Sport: Athletics
- Event: Discus throw
- College team: Florida State Seminoles

Kellion Knibb (born 25 December 1993) is a Jamaican athlete specialising in the discus throw. She represented her country at the 2016 Summer Olympics without posting a valid throw in the qualification round. She also competed at the 2014 Commonwealth Games finishing sixth.

Her personal best in the event is 62.07 metres set in Philadelphia in 2017. This is the current national record.

== International competitions ==
Year	Competition	Venue	Position	Event	Notes
Representing Jamaica
2009	CARIFTA Games (U17)	Vieux Fort, Saint Lucia	4th	Shot put	10.47 m
2009	CARIFTA Games (U17)	Vieux Fort, Saint Lucia	2nd	Discus throw	39.19 m
2009	CARIFTA Games (U17)	Vieux Fort, Saint Lucia	2nd	Javelin throw	35.76 m
2011	CARIFTA Games (U20)	Montego Bay, Jamaica	2nd	Shot put	13.79 m
2011	CARIFTA Games (U20)	Montego Bay, Jamaica	2nd	Discus throw	42.49 m
2011	CARIFTA Games (U20)	Montego Bay, Jamaica	2nd	Javelin throw	45.38 m
2012	CARIFTA Games (U20)	Hamilton, Bermuda	4th	Shot put	12.75 m
2012	CARIFTA Games (U20)	Hamilton, Bermuda	4th	Javelin throw	31.41 m
2014	Commonwealth Games	Glasgow, United Kingdom	6th	Discus throw	57.39 m
2016	Olympic Games	Rio de Janeiro, Brazil	–	Discus throw	NM
2017	World Championships	London, United Kingdom	23rd (q)	Discus throw	56.73 m
