= Pedrya Seymour =

Bahamian hurdler (born 1995)

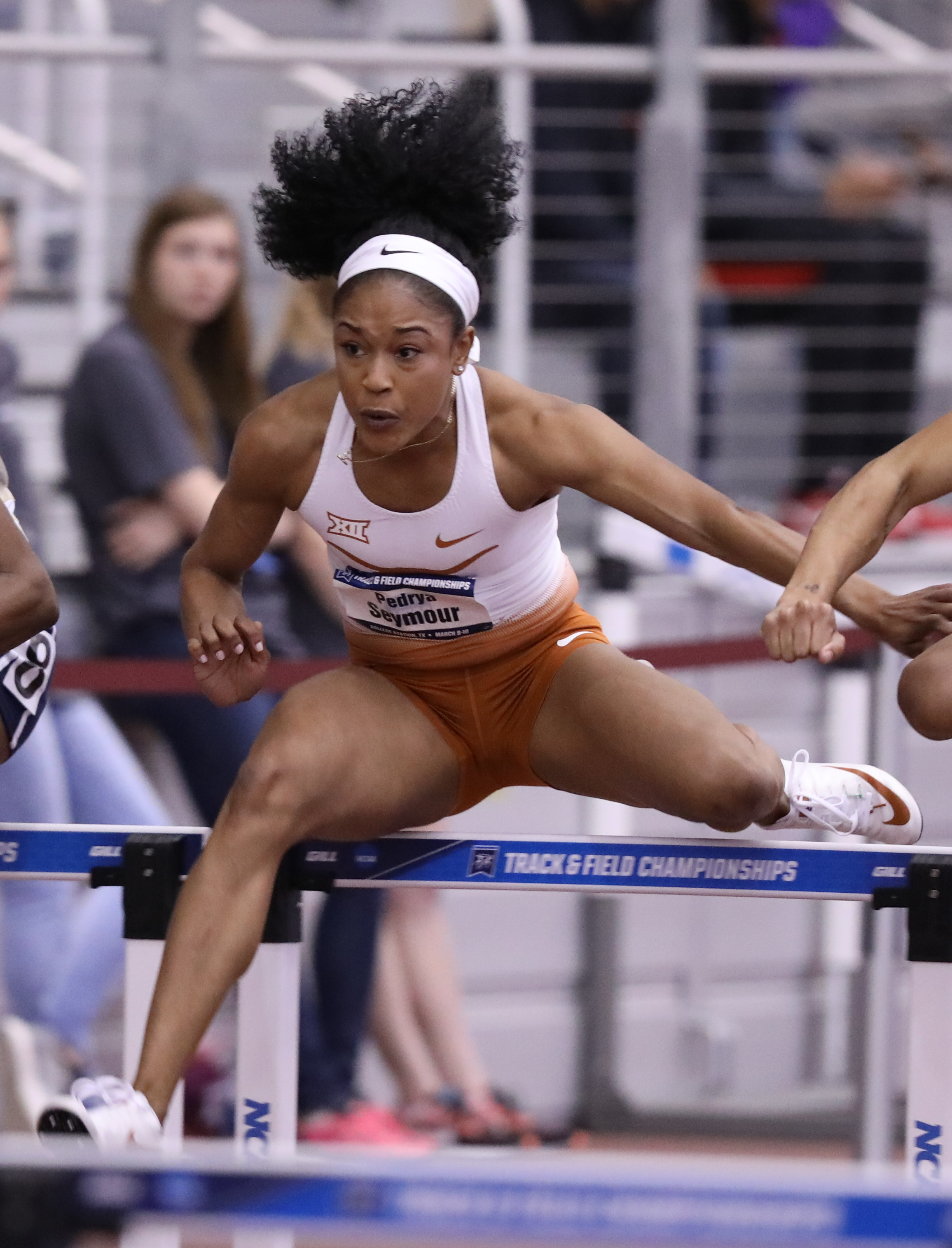
- Seymour in 2018

Personal information
- Born: 29 May 1995 (age 31) Nassau, Bahamas
- Education: University of Illinois at Urbana-Champaign

Sport
- Sport: Athletics
- Events: 60 m hurdles, 100 m hurdles
- College team: Illinois Fighting Illini

Pedrya Seymour (born 29 May 1995) is a Bahamian Olympic athlete competing in hurdling events. She competed at the 2016 Summer Olympics, and 2020 Summer Olympics, in 100 m hurdles.

== Career ==
She studied at University of Texas, Austin, and University of Illinois, Champaign.

She represented her country at the 2016 World Indoor Championships without qualifying for the final. She placed 6th in the 2016 Summer Olympics finals in the 100 meters hurdles, and was the first Bahamian hurdler to make it to the finals. She competed at the 2019 Pan American Games.

== Competition record ==
Year	Competition	Venue	Position	Event	Notes
Representing the Bahamas
2010	CARIFTA Games (U17)	George Town, Cayman Islands	5th	300 m H (76.2 m)	44.48
2010	CARIFTA Games (U17)	George Town, Cayman Islands	3rd	4x400 m	3:48.86
2011	CARIFTA Games (U17)	Montego Bay, Jamaica	4th	300 m H (76.2 m)	42.66
2011	CARIFTA Games (U17)	Montego Bay, Jamaica	3rd	4x400 m	3:50.18
2011	Pan American Junior Championships	Miramar, United States	3rd	4x400 m	3:42.61
2012	CARIFTA Games (U20)	Hamilton, Bermuda	6th	400 m H	64.07
2012	Central American and Caribbean; Junior Championships (U18)	San Salvador, El Salvador	4th	400 m H (76.2 m)	60.91
2012	Central American and Caribbean; Junior Championships (U18)	San Salvador, El Salvador	–	4x400 m	DQ
2012	World Junior Championships	Barcelona, Spain	29th (h)	400 m H	61.09
2013	CARIFTA Games (U20)	Nassau, Bahamas	4th	400 m H	62.25
2013	CARIFTA Games (U20)	Nassau, Bahamas	3rd	4x400 m	3:45.95
2016	World Indoor Championships	Portland, United States	11th (h)	60 m H	8.15
2016	NACAC U23 Championships	San Salvador, El Salvador	2nd	100 m H	12.83
2016	NACAC U23 Championships	San Salvador, El Salvador	3rd	4x100 m	45.17
2016	Olympic Games	Rio de Janeiro, Brazil	6th	100 m H	12.76
2019	Pan American Games	Lima, Peru	5th	100 m H	13.12
2019	Pan American Games	Lima, Peru	–	4x100 m	DNF
2021	Olympic Games	Tokyo, Japan	22nd (sf)	100 m H	13.09
