= Delano Davis =

Bahamian sprinter

Personal information
- Nationality: Bahamas
- Born: 7 January 1995 (age 31)

Sport
- Sport: Running
- Event(s): 100 metres, 200 metres

Achievements and titles
- Personal best(s): 100 m: 10.35 (Hutchinson, Kansas 2015); 200 m: 21.11 Nassau, Bahamas 2017)
Medal record
Men's athletics
Representing the Bahamas
Pan American Junior Championships
Bronze medal – third place	2011 Miramar	4×100 m relay
CAC Junior Championships (Youth)
Silver medal – second place	2010 Santo Domingo	4×100 m relay
Bronze medal – third place	2012 San Salvador	4×100 m relay
CARIFTA Games (Youth)
Gold medal – first place	2011 Montego Bay	100 m
Silver medal – second place	2010 George Town	4×100 m relay
Bronze medal – third place	2011 Montego Bay	200 m
Bronze medal – third place	2011 Montego Bay	4×100 m relay

Delano Davis (born 7 January 1995) is a Bahamian sprinter. He was born on Abaco Island, and attended Sunland Baptist Academy in Freeport, Bahamas. He would later go on to compete for Essex County College and LIU Brooklyn.

He won a gold medal in the 100 metres at the 2011 CARIFTA Games.
