= Delano Williams =

Turks and Caicos-born sprinter

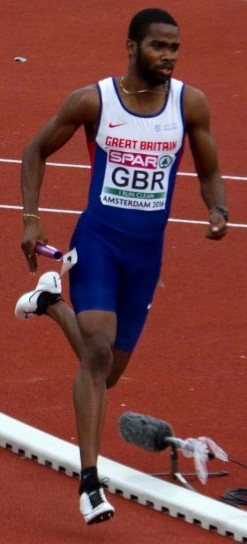
- Delano Williams in 2016

Personal information
- Born: 23 December 1993 (age 32) Grand Turk Island, Turks and Caicos Islands
- Height: 180 cm (5 ft 11 in)
- Weight: 73 kg (161 lb)

Sport
- Sport: Running
- Events: 100 metres, 200 metres, 400 metres
- Club: Enfield and Haringey AC

Achievements and titles
- Personal bests: 100 m: 10.28 (Kingston 2013); 200 m: 20.27 (Kingston 2013); 400 m: 45.42 (Kingston 2015)
Medal record
Men's athletics
Representing Great Britain
World Championships
Bronze medal – third place	2015 Beijing	4×400 m relay
European Championships
Bronze medal – third place	2016 Amsterdam	4 x 400 m relay
Representing the Turks and Caicos Islands
World Junior Championships
Gold medal – first place	2012 Barcelona	200 m
CARIFTA Games (Junior)
Gold medal – first place	2012 Hamilton	200 m
Bronze medal – third place	2012 Hamilton	4×100 m relay
Gold medal – first place	2011 Montego Bay	200 m
CARIFTA Games (Youth)
Bronze medal – third place	2009 Vieux Fort	200 m

Delano Livingston Williams (born 23 December 1993) is a British sprinter, originally from the British Overseas Territory of the Turks and Caicos Islands. In June 2013, it was confirmed that Williams would henceforth compete for Great Britain, as was his right by dint of the right to British citizenship of Turks and Caicos Islanders. Williams trains with the Racers Track Club in Jamaica.

== Career ==
He attended Munro College in St Elizabeth, Jamaica. He joined the college after a Jamaican talent scout spotted his speed in a baseball game in his native Turks and Caicos.

Williams aimed to compete for Great Britain in the 200 metres at the 2012 Summer Olympics. He cannot represent his native Turks and Caicos Islands, because they are not recognised by the International Olympic Committee, however, using a similar by-law to Anguillan long jumper Shara Proctor, Williams is eligible to represent Great Britain as Turks and Caicos are a British Overseas Territory. He finished fifth at the UK Olympics Trials, so was not selected. He competed for Great Britain in the 2016 Rio Summer Olympics.

Born and raised on Grand Turk Island to a Haitian mother, Williams moved to Jamaica in 2008. Running for Munro College, he won the 100 and 200 metres at the 2012 Jamaican National High School Track and Field Championships, becoming the first non-national to do so.

He did, however, represent Turks and Caicos at the 2012 World Junior Championships in Athletics in Barcelona, Spain. He won a gold medal in the 200 metres.
