= Omar McLeod =

Jamaican athletics competitor

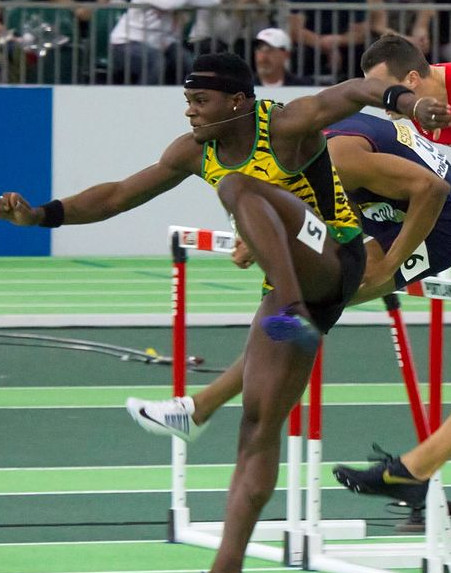
- McLeod at the 2016 IAAF World Indoor Championships

Personal information
- Born: 25 April 1994 (age 32) Clarendon, Jamaica
- Height: 180 cm (5 ft 11 in)

Sport
- Sport: Track
- Events: Hurdles and sprints
- College team: Arkansas Razorbacks
- Team: PUMA
- Turned pro: 2015

Achievements and titles
- Personal bests: 60 m hurdles: 7.41 NR (Portland, 2016); 100 m: 9.99 (Fayetteville, 2016); 110 m hurdles: 12.90 NR (Kingston, 2017); 400 m hurdles: 49.98 (Kingston, 2013)
Medal record
Men's athletics
Representing Jamaica
Olympic Games
Gold medal – first place	2016 Rio de Janeiro	110 m hurdles
World Championships
Gold medal – first place	2017 London	110 m hurdles
World Indoor Championships
Gold medal – first place	2016 Portland	60 m hurdles
CACAC Junior Championships (U20)
Gold medal – first place	2012 San Salvador	4 × 400 m relay
CARIFTA Games (U20)
Gold medal – first place	2013 Kingston	400 m hurdles
Gold medal – first place	2012 Hamilton	400 m hurdles
Gold medal – first place	2011 Montego Bay	400 m hurdles
Silver medal – second place	2013 Kingston	110 m hurdles
Silver medal – second place	2011 Montego Bay	4 × 400 m relay
Bronze medal – third place	2012 Hamilton	4 × 400 m relay
Bronze medal – third place	2011 Montego Bay	110 m hurdles

Omar McLeod (born 25 April 1994) is a Jamaican professional hurdler and sprinter competing in the 60 m hurdles and 110 m hurdles. In the latter event, he is the 2016 Olympic champion and 2017 World champion. He was NCAA indoor champion in the 60 m hurdles in 2014 and 2015 and outdoor champion in the 110 m hurdles in 2015; he turned professional after the 2015 collegiate season, forgoing his two remaining years of collegiate eligibility. His personal best in the 110 m hurdles (12.90 seconds) ranks him equal 7th on the world all-time list.

== Early career ==
McLeod was a promising high school athlete, running for Manchester High School and later Kingston College; during his early career, he competed in both the 110 m and 400 m hurdles. He represented Jamaica at the 2011 World Youth Championships in Lille, qualifying for the finals in both hurdles events; he placed fourth in the 110 m hurdles and eighth in the 400 m hurdles. At the CARIFTA Games, he won gold in the under-20 400 m hurdles for three consecutive years (2011, 2012 and 2013); he scored another five medals in the 110 m hurdles and 4 × 400 m relay including a relay gold in 2013. He also won gold in the relay at the 2012 CAC Junior Championships in San Salvador.

In 2013, his final year in high school, McLeod set Jamaican junior records in both the 110 m (13.24 s) and 400 m hurdles (49.98 s) at the Boys and Girls Championships; he was the first Jamaican high schooler to break 50 s in the latter. After graduating from Kingston College, he went to the University of Arkansas on a track and field scholarship.

== Collegiate career ==
McLeod had no experience running indoors before his move to the United States, but adapted rapidly; he won the 60 m hurdles as a freshman at the 2014 NCAA indoor championships in Albuquerque with a personal best 7.57 s in the heats and 7.58 s in the final. Outdoors, he placed second in the 110 m hurdles at both the Southeastern Conference (SEC) championships and West Regionals, but pulled a hamstring at the NCAA championships and missed the final.

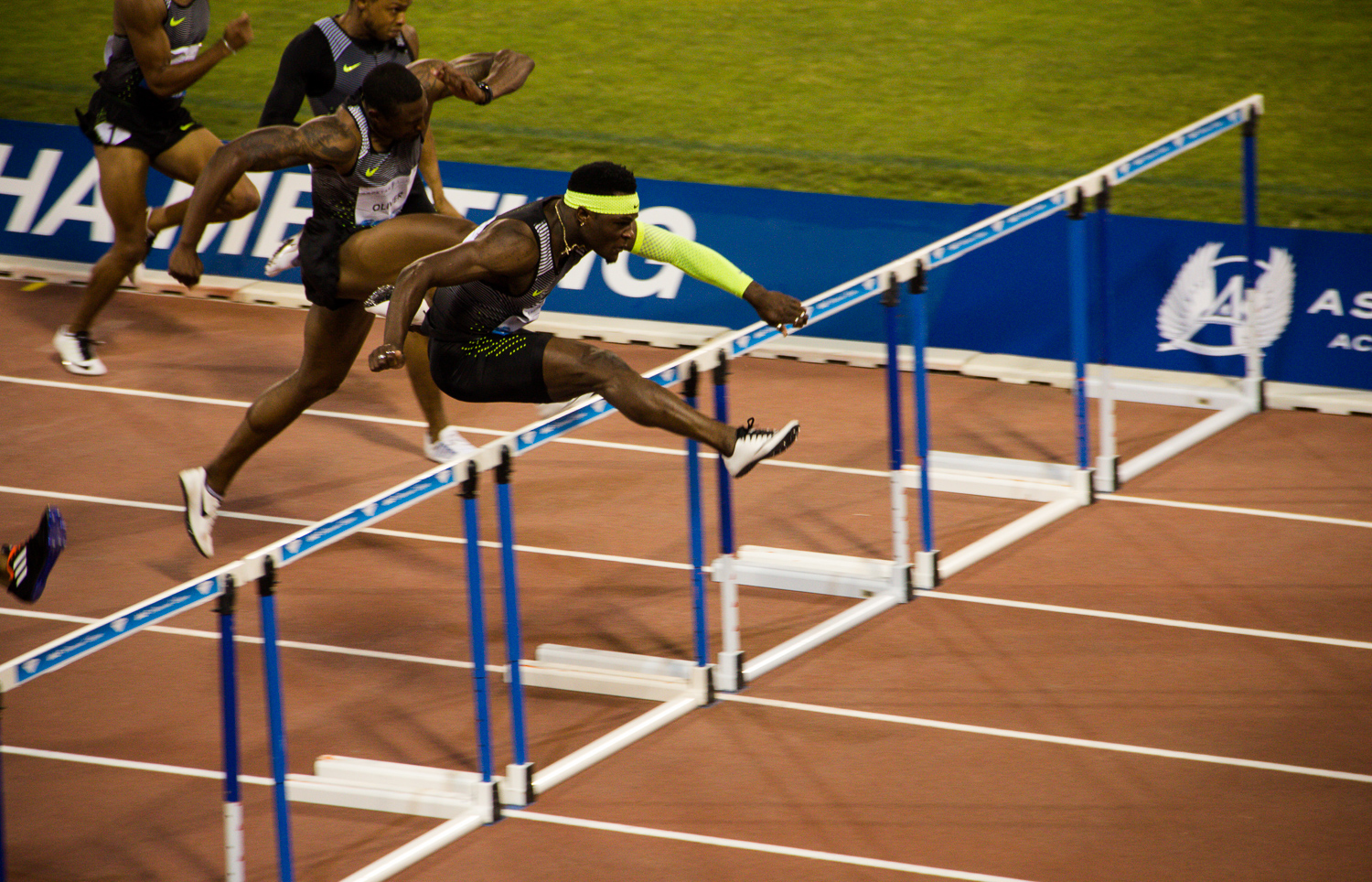
Omar McLeod racing at the 2016 Doha Diamond League meeting

McLeod returned to competition in 2015; he won the SEC indoor title in a personal best 7.49. At the 2015 NCAA indoor championships he repeated as champion, running 7.55 in the heats and 7.45 in the final; his time in the final was a new Jamaican indoor record, broke Reggie Torian's NCAA record from 1997 and tied with Cuba's Orlando Ortega for the world's fastest time that winter. Outdoors, McLeod set a personal best of 13.21 at the Drake Relays and won at both the SEC meet and the West Regionals. He entered the NCAA outdoor championships in Eugene as the favorite; he won, running 13.08 in the heats and 13.01 in the final, but both times were wind-aided. Only two collegiate athlete, Renaldo Nehemiah in 1979, had run faster in any conditions. In addition to his hurdles victory, McLeod ran on the Arkansas relay teams in both the 4 × 100 m relay and the 4 × 400 m relay; Arkansas won the 4 × 100 m in 38.47 and placed sixth in the longer relay.

After the 2015 collegiate season McLeod turned professional and signed an endorsement deal with Nike, forgoing his two remaining years as an NCAA athlete; although he stayed at Arkansas to complete his business studies, he lost his eligibility to represent the Arkansas Razorbacks.

== Professional career ==
McLeod won the 110 m hurdles at the 2015 Jamaican Championships, defeating national record holder Hansle Parchment in a wind-legal 12.97 and breaking 13 seconds for the first time; the time was world-leading for a week. He made his debut as a professional at the István Gyulai Memorial in Székesfehérvár on 7 July, but pulled up with a cramp and failed to finish. At the 2015 IAAF World Championships in Beijing, China, he finished 6th in finals with 13.18. (2015 World Championships in Athletics - Men's 110 metres hurdles)

At the start of the 2016 outdoor season, he ran 9.99 seconds for the 100 metres, becoming the first athlete to complete the 110 m hurdles in under 13 seconds and also break the 10-second barrier.

At the 2016 Rio Olympics, he won Gold in the 110 m hurdles.

Based on his outstanding athletic performance, McLeod was crowned Jamaica's 2017 Sportsman of the Year. During 2017, he won six of seven 110 m hurdles races, including the gold in London (2017 World Championships in Athletics – Men's 110 metres hurdles).

At the 2019 World Championships, McLeod was disqualified in the final for a lane violation, impeding Orlando Ortega. Ortega was second in the 110 metres hurdles until McLeod stumbled into him and arrested his momentum. After the appeal of the Spanish Federation, the IAAF awarded Ortega with a bronze medal.

Since 2018, after experiencing personal setbacks and tragedies, he struggles to return to top form.

== Statistics ==
Information from IAAF profile or Track & Field Results Reporting System unless otherwise noted.

=== Personal bests ===
Event	Time (s)	Competition	Venue	Date	Notes
60 m	6.61	Arkansas Qualifier	Fayetteville, Arkansas, U.S.	17 February 2017	
60 m hurdles	7.41	World Indoor Championships	Portland, Oregon, U.S.	20 March 2016	WL, NR
100 m	9.99	John McDonnell Invitational	Fayetteville, Arkansas, U.S.	23 April 2016	+2.0 m/s wind
110 m hurdles	12.90	Jamaican Championships	Kingston, Jamaica	24 June 2017	+0.7 m/s wind, WL, NR, CR
200 m	20.48	Arkansas Qualifier	Fayetteville, Arkansas, U.S.	17 February 2017	Indoor
400 m	47.41	Arkansas Invitational	Fayetteville, Arkansas, U.S.	9 January 2015	Indoor
400 m hurdles	49.98	Jamaican Secondary School Championships	Kingston, Jamaica	15 March 2013	NJR, CR
4 × 100 m relay	38.17	Texas Relays	Austin, Texas, U.S.	1 April 2017	
4 × 200 m relay	1:20.87	Texas Relays	Austin, Texas, U.S.	1 April 2017	
4 × 400 m relay	3:03.89	Drake Relays	Des Moines, Iowa, U.S.	26 April 2014	
4 × 400 m relay indoor	3:04.94	SEC Indoor Championships	College Station, Texas, U.S.	1 March 2014	

=== Seasonal bests ===
Year	60 metres hurdles	110 metres hurdles
2011	—	14.10
2012	—	13.83
2013	—	13.24
2014	7.57	13.44
2015	7.45	12.97
2016	7.41	12.98
2017	7.46	12.90
2018	7.46	13.16
2019	—	13.07

=== International championship results ===
Year	Competition	Venue	Position	Event	Time	Wind (m/s)	Notes
Representing Jamaica
2011	CARIFTA Games (U20)	Montego Bay, Jamaica	1st	400 m hurdles	52.42	n/a	PB
2011	CARIFTA Games (U20)	Montego Bay, Jamaica	3rd	110 m hurdles	14.10	−0.8	PB
2011	CARIFTA Games (U20)	Montego Bay, Jamaica	2nd	4 × 400 m relay	3:09.41	n/a	PB
2011	World Youth Championships	Villeneuve-d'Ascq, France	4th	110 m hurdles	13.61	+0.1	PB
2011	World Youth Championships	Villeneuve-d'Ascq, France	8th	400 m hurdles	52.82	n/a	
2011	World Youth Championships	Villeneuve-d'Ascq, France	DNS	Medley relay	—	n/a	
2012	CARIFTA Games (U20)	Hamilton, Bermuda	1st	400 m hurdles	52.35	n/a	
2012	CARIFTA Games (U20)	Hamilton, Bermuda	3rd	4 × 400 m relay	3:12.48	n/a	SB
2012	CACAC Junior Championships (U20)	San Salvador, El Salvador	1st	4 × 400 m relay	3:08.94	n/a	PB
2012	World Junior Championships	Barcelona, Spain	1st (semi 1)	4 × 400 m relay	3:08.83	n/a	Q (Note: Did not run in the final.), PB
2013	CARIFTA Games (U20)	Nassau, The Bahamas	1st	400 m hurdles	51.46	n/a	
2013	CARIFTA Games (U20)	Nassau, The Bahamas	2nd	110 m hurdles	13.57	NWI	
2015	World Championships	Beijing, China	6th	110 m hurdles	13.18	+0.1	
2016	World Indoor Championships	Portland, Oregon, U.S.	1st	60 m hurdles	7.41	n/a	WL, NR
2016	Olympic Games	Rio de Janeiro, Brazil	1st	110 m hurdles	13.05	+0.2	
2017	World Championships	London, England	1st	110 m hurdles	13.04	0.0	
2017	World Championships	London, England	DNF	4 × 100 m relay	—	n/a	Teammate injury
2019	World Championships	Doha, Qatar	DQ	110 m hurdles	—	+0.6	Impeding competitors

=== National championship results ===
Year	Competition	Venue	Position	Event	Time	Wind (m/s)	Notes
Representing Manchester High School
2012	Jamaican Secondary School Championships (U19)	Kingston, Jamaica	3rd	400 m hurdles	51.30	n/a	PB
2012	Jamaican Secondary School Championships (U19)	Kingston, Jamaica	4th	110 m hurdles	14.66	−6.3	
2012	Jamaican Junior Championships	Kingston, Jamaica	3rd	400 m hurdles	51.16	n/a	PB
2012	Jamaican Junior Championships	Kingston, Jamaica	3rd	110 m hurdles	13.83	−1.8	PB
Representing Kingston College
2013	Jamaican CARIFTA Trials (U20)	Kingston, Jamaica	1st	400 m hurdles	51.05	n/a	PB
2013	Jamaican Secondary School Championships (U19)	Kingston, Jamaica	1st	400 m hurdles	49.98	n/a	NJR, CR, PB
2013	Jamaican Secondary School Championships (U19)	Kingston, Jamaica	1st	110 m hurdles	13.24	+0.4	NJR, CR, PB
Representing the Arkansas Razorbacks
2014	NCAA Division I Indoor Championships	Albuquerque, New Mexico, U.S.	1st	60 m hurdles	7.58	n/a	A
2014	NCAA Division I Indoor Championships	Albuquerque, New Mexico, U.S.	3rd	4 × 400 m relay	3:06.29	n/a	
2014	NCAA Division I Championships	Eugene, Oregon, U.S.	DNF (semi 3)	110 m hurdles	—	+0.2	Injury
2015	NCAA Division I Indoor Championships	Fayetteville, Arkansas, U.S.	1st	60 m hurdles	7.45	n/a	WL, NR, NCAAR, CR, PB
2015	NCAA Division I Indoor Championships	Fayetteville, Arkansas, U.S.	8th	4 × 400 m relay	3:08.04	n/a	
2015	NCAA Division I Championships	Eugene, Oregon, U.S.	1st	110 m hurdles	13.01 w	+3.9	Wind-assisted
2015	NCAA Division I Championships	Eugene, Oregon, U.S.	1st	4 × 100 m relay	38.47	n/a	PB
2015	NCAA Division I Championships	Eugene, Oregon, U.S.	6th	4 × 400 m relay	3:05.91	n/a	
2015	Jamaican Championships	Kingston, Jamaica	1st	110 m hurdles	12.97	+1.0	WL, CR, PB
Representing Nike
2016	Jamaican Championships	Kingston, Jamaica	1st	110 m hurdles	13.01	+0.4	
2017	Jamaican Championships	Kingston, Jamaica	1st	110 m hurdles	12.90	+0.7	WL, NR, CR, PB

=== Circuit performances ===
Representing Nike

Grand Slam Track results
Slam	Race group	Event	Pl.	Time	Prize money
2025 Kingston Slam	Short hurdles	110 m hurdles	6th	13.38	US$12,500
2025 Kingston Slam	Short hurdles	100 m	6th	10.73	US$12,500

==== 110 metres hurdles ====
- Diamond League
  - Doha: 2016
  - Shanghai: 2016, 2017, 2018, 2019
  - Eugene: 2016, 2017, 2018
  - Birmingham: 2019

=== Track records ===
As of 7 September 2024, McLeod holds the following track records for 110 metres hurdles.

Location	Time	Windspeed m/s	Date
Coral Gables, Florida	13.27	+0.2	09/04/2022
Florence	13.01	–0.1	10/06/2021
Irvine	13.11	+1.4	14/05/2021
Kingston, Jamaica	12.90	+0.7	24/06/2017
Rio de Janeiro	13.05	+0.2	16/08/2016
Starkville	13.28	+1.9	16/05/2015

== Notes ==
Records
Preceded by Maurice Wignall	Men's 60 m hurdles Jamaican record holder 14 March 2015 - present	Incumbent
Preceded by Hansle Parchment	Men's 110 m hurdles Jamaican record holder 24 June 2017 - present	Incumbent

Achievements
Preceded by (France) Pascal Martinot-Lagarde	Men's 60 m hurdles season's best 2015, 2016	Succeeded by (United Kingdom) Andrew Pozzi
Preceded by (Cuba) Orlando Ortega	Men's 110 m hurdles season's best 2016, 2017	Succeeded by (Russia) Sergey Shubenkov
