= Christoff Bryan =

Jamaican high jumper (born 1996)

Personal information
- Nationality: Jamaican
- Born: 26 April 1996 (age 30)
- Education: Florida State University
- Height: 1.93 m (6 ft 4 in)

Sport
- Sport: Track and field
- Event: High jump
Medal record
Men's athletics
Representing Jamaica
World Youth Championships
Bronze medal – third place	2013 Donetsk	High jump
CAC Junior Championships (Youth)
Gold medal – first place	2012 San Salvador	High jump
CARIFTA Games (Youth)
Gold medal – first place	2012 Hamilton	High jump
Gold medal – first place	2011 Montego Bay	High jump

Christoff Bryan (born 26 April 1996) is a Jamaican high jumper. He established himself globally in age category competitions with a bronze medal at the 2013 World Youth Championships in Athletics and a fourth-place finish at the 2014 World Junior Championships in Athletics.

Bryan attended Wolmer's Boys' School. He then was an All-American for the Kansas State Wildcats track and field team and finished his NCAA eligibility for the Florida State Seminoles track and field team. He became a member of the MVP Track Club in 2022.

He won a gold medal at the 2012 Central American and Caribbean Junior Championships in Athletics in San Salvador. He broke the Jamaica Issa Boys&Girls Championships High Jump record on March 16, 2013, earning him a gold medal for himself and Wolmer's Boys High School.

== Personal bests ==
Event	Result	Venue	Date
Outdoor
High jump	2.24 m	(United States) Eugene, Oregon	25 Jul 2014
Indoor
High jump	2.28 m	(United States) Fayetteville, Arkansas	14 Feb 2015

== Competition record ==
Year	Competition	Venue	Position	Event	Notes
Representing Jamaica
2011	CARIFTA Games (U17)	Montego Bay, Jamaica	1st	High jump	2.10m
2012	CARIFTA Games (U17)	Hamilton, Bermuda	1st	High jump	2.05m
2012	CARIFTA Games (U17)	Hamilton, Bermuda	3rd	Triple jump	14.25m (wind: +0.5 m/s)
2012	Central American and Caribbean Junior Championships (U18)	San Salvador, El Salvador	1st	High jump	2.11m
2012	World Junior Championships	Barcelona, Spain	25th (q)	High jump	2.10m
2013	CARIFTA Games (U20)	Nassau, Bahamas	1st	High jump	2.14m
2013	Pan American Junior Championships	Medellín, Colombia	2nd	High jump	2.16m
2013	World Youth Championships	Donetsk, Ukraine	3rd	High jump	2.16m
2014	CARIFTA Games (U20)	Fort-de-France, Martinique	2nd	High jump	2.16m
2014	World Junior Championships	Eugene, Oregon, United States	4th	High jump	2.24m
2015	CARIFTA Games (U20)	Basseterre, Saint Kitts and Nevis	1st	High jump	2.21m
2016	NACAC U23 Championships	San Salvador, El Salvador	7th	High jump	2.05m
