= Jevaughn Minzie =

Jamaican sprinter (born 1995)

Personal information
- Nationality: Jamaica
- Born: 20 July 1995 (age 30)
- Height: 1.78 m (5 ft 10 in)
- Weight: 85 kg (187 lb)

Sport
- Sport: Running
- Event: Sprints

Achievements and titles
- Personal bests: 100 m: 10.02 (Kingston 2016); 200 m: 20.37 (Kingston 2014)
Medal record
Men's athletics
Representing Jamaica
Olympic Games
Gold medal – first place	2016 Rio de Janeiro	4 × 100 m relay
World Junior Championships
Silver medal – second place	2012 Barcelona	4 × 100 m relay
Bronze medal – third place	2014 Oregon	4 × 100 m relay
CARIFTA Games (Junior)
Gold medal – first place	2014 Fort-de-France	100 m
Gold medal – first place	2014 Fort-de-France	4 × 100 m relay
Silver medal – second place	2012 Hamilton	4 × 100 m relay
Silver medal – second place	2013 Nassau	200 m
Silver medal – second place	2014 Fort-de-France	200 m
CARIFTA Games (Youth)
Gold medal – first place	2011 Montego Bay	4 × 100 m relay
Gold medal – first place	2011 Montego Bay	4 × 400 m relay
Silver medal – second place	2011 Montego Bay	100 m
Silver medal – second place	2011 Montego Bay	200 m

Jevaughn Minzie (born 20 July 1995) is a Jamaican sprinter. He is one of only fourteen youth sprinters to run 100 metres in less than 10.3 seconds.

In the 200 metres final of the 2011 CARIFTA Games, Minzie mimicked Usain Bolt's 2008 Beijing pre-finish celebration, but was subsequently caught by Machel Cedenio. He was a part of the Jamaican relay team which won the gold medal at the 2016 Summer Olympics, running only in the heats.
