= 2013 World Youth Championships in Athletics – Boys' high jump =

Boys' high jump at the 2013 World Youth Championships in Athletics
- Venue: RSC Olimpiyskiy
- Dates: 11 July (qualification); 13 July (final)
- Competitors: 39
- Winning height: 2.20 PB

Medalists
gold medal	Woo Sang-hyeok	South Korea
silver medal	Bai Jiaxu	China
bronze medal	Christoff Bryan	Jamaica

The boys' high jump at the 2013 World Youth Championships in Athletics was held on 11 and 13 July.

== Medalists ==
Gold	Silver	Bronze
Woo Sang-hyeok; South Korea	Bai Jiaxu; China	Christoff Bryan; Jamaica

== Records ==
Prior to the competition, the following records were as follows.

World Youth Best	Javier Sotomayor (CUB)	2.33	Havana, Cuba	19 May 1984
Championship Record	Huang Haiqiang (CHN)	2.27	Marrakesh, Morocco	16 July 2005
World Youth Leading	Randall Cunningham (USA)	2.21	Las Vegas, United States	18 May 2013

== Qualification ==
Qualification rule: 2.09 (Q) or at least 12 best performers (q) qualified.

Rank	Group	Name	Nationality	1.95	2.00	2.04	2.07	2.09	Result	Notes
1	B	Christoff Bryan	Jamaica	–	–	o	o	o	2.09	Q
1	A	Filippo Lari	Italy	o	o	o	o	o	2.09	Q, PB
1	A	Woo Sang-hyeok	South Korea	–	–	o	o	o	2.09	Q
4	A	Ilya Spitsyn	Russia	o	xo	o	o	o	2.09	Q, PB
5	A	Bai Jiaxu	China	o	xo	o	xo	o	2.09	Q
6	A	LaQuan Nairn	Bahamas	–	o	o	o	xo	2.09	Q
6	A	Paul Galas	Canada	o	o	o	o	xo	2.09	Q, PB
8	B	Oskar Lundqvist	Sweden	o	o	xo	o	xo	2.09	Q, PB
8	A	David Cussen	Ireland	o	xo	o	o	xo	2.09	Q
8	A	Oleksandr Barannikov	Ukraine	o	o	o	xo	xo	2.09	Q, PB
11	A	Henrik Thoms	Sweden	o	o	xo	xo	xo	2.09	Q, PB
12	B	Jan Westreicher	Peru	xo	xo	o	o	xxo	2.09	Q
13	B	Simon Lange	Germany	o	o	o	o	xxx	2.07	
14	B	Vladyslav Mazur	Ukraine	o	o	xo	o	xxx	2.07	
15	A	Tiaan Steenkamp	South Africa	o	xxo	xxo	o	xxx	2.07	
16	B	Jonas Kløjgård Jensen	Denmark	o	o	o	xo	xxx	2.07	PB
17	B	Pavel Seliverstau	Belarus	o	xo	xxo	xo	xxx	2.07	PB
18	B	Petr Pícha	Czech Republic	o	o	o	xxo	xxx	2.07	
19	A	Ricardo Valdez	Mexico	xxo	xxo	xxo	xxo	xxx	2.07	PB
20	B	Michael Monroe	United States	–	o	o	xxx		2.04	
21	B	Aleksey Krupnov	Russia	o	o	xo	xxx		2.04	
21	B	Roman Loshkarev	Kazakhstan	o	o	xo	xxx		2.04	
23	B	James Elson	Canada	xxo	xxo	xo	xxx		2.04	PB
24	B	Yang Lubang	China	–	o	xxx			2.00	
24	B	Simon Asare	Austria	o	o	xxx			2.00	
26	A	Simon Asare	Czech Republic	xxo	o	xxx			2.00	
27	A	Adrián Sobrino	Spain	o	xo	xxx			2.00	
27	A	Dorian Tharaud	France	–	xo	xxx			2.00	
27	B	Federico Ayres Da Motta	Italy	o	xo	xxx			2.00	
27	B	Lenny Meerschaert	France	o	xo	xxx			2.00	
31	A	Alasgar Mammadov	Azerbaijan	xo	xo	xxx			2.00	
31	B	Mohamed Fodil	Algeria	xo	xo	xxx			2.00	
33	B	Filip Kossmann	Poland	o	xxo	xxx			2.00	
33	B	Miguel Chávez	Mexico	o	xxo	xxx			2.00	
35	A	Anton Senft	Germany	xo	xxo	xxx			2.00	
35	B	Juan López	Spain	xo	xxo	xxx			2.00	
37	A	Samir Hodžić	Bosnia and Herzegovina	xxo	xxx				1.95	
37	A	Tunahan Durmaz	Turkey	xxo	xxx				1.95	
	A	Dmitriy Melsitov	Uzbekistan	xxx					NM	

== Final ==
Rank	Name	Nationality	1.97	2.02	2.07	2.11	2.14	2.16	2.18	2.20	2.23	Result	Notes
1st place, gold medalist(s)	Woo Sang-hyeok	South Korea	–	o	xo	o	o	o	o	o	x–	2.20	PB
2nd place, silver medalist(s)	Bai Jiaxu	China	o	o	o	o	xo	o	xo	xxx		2.18	PB
3rd place, bronze medalist(s)	Christoff Bryan	Jamaica	–	–	o	–	o	o	xxx			2.16	
4	Oleksandr Barannikov	Ukraine	o	o	o	o	xo	xo	xxx			2.16	PB
5	LaQuan Nairn	Bahamas	–	o	o	o	xxo	xo	xxx			2.16	PB
6	Ilya Spitsyn	Russia	o	o	xo	xo	xxx					2.11	PB
7	Paul Galas	Canada	o	o	xo	xxo	xxx					2.11	PB
8	Oskar Lundqvist	Sweden	o	xo	o	xxx						2.07	
9	David Cussen	Ireland	o	o	xo	xxx						2.07	
10	Jan Westreicher	Peru	xo	xxo	xxo	xxx						2.07	
11	Henrik Thoms	Sweden	o	o	xxx							2.02	
11	Filippo Lari	Italy	o	o	xxx							2.02	
