= 2011 World Youth Championships in Athletics – Boys' 400 metres hurdles =

Boys' 400 metres hurdles at the 2011 World Youth Championships in Athletics
- Venue: Stadium Lille Métropole
- Dates: 6 July (heats); 7 July (semifinal); 9 July (final)
- Competitors: 43
- Winning time: 50.97 WYL

Medalists
gold medal	Egor Kuznetsov	Russia
silver medal	Ibrahim Mohammed Saleh	Saudi Arabia
bronze medal	Takahiro Matsumoto	Japan

The boys' 400 metres hurdles at the 2011 World Youth Championships in Athletics was held at the Stadium Lille Métropole on 6, 7 and 9 July.

== Medalists ==
Gold	Silver	Bronze
Egor Kuznetsov; Russia	Ibrahim Mohammed Saleh; Saudi Arabia	Takahiro Matsumoto; Japan

== Records ==
Prior to the competition, the following records were as follows.

World Youth Best	William Wynne (USA)	49.01	Ostrava, Czech Republic	15 July 2007
Championship Record	William Wynne (USA)	49.01	Ostrava, Czech Republic	15 July 2007
World Youth Leading	Christiaan Mouton (RSA)	51.24	Paarl, South Africa	12 March 2011

During the competition, Egor Kuznetsov lowered the world youth leading to 50.97.

== Heats ==
Qualification rule: first 3 of each heat (Q) plus the 6 fastest times (q) qualified.

=== Heat 1 ===
Rank	Lane	Name	Nationality	Time	Notes
1	3	Yahya Ibrahim Barnawi	Saudi Arabia	51.93	Q, PB
2	4	Jonathan Russell	United States	51.94	Q, PB
3	2	Ken Kirui Tele	Kenya	52.58	Q, PB
4	5	Riadh Sayeh	Tunisia	53.09	q
5	7	Gerald Drummond	Costa Rica	53.22	q, PB
6	6	Timothee Yap Jin Wei	Singapore	54.55	PB
7	1	Roman Olejník	Slovakia	55.77	

=== Heat 2 ===
Rank	Lane	Name	Nationality	Time	Notes
1	5	Durgesh Kumar	India	52.22	Q
2	7	Chiebonam Mba	Nigeria	53.47	Q, PB
3	3	Mattia Contini	Italy	53.88	Q
4	1	Oleksiy Matskevych	Ukraine	53.92	q
5	2	Johan Nicolai Hartling	Denmark	54.24	PB
6	6	Jordan Sherwood	Canada	55.54	
7	4	Ali Mohammed	Kuwait	55.63	

=== Heat 3 ===
Rank	Lane	Name	Nationality	Time	Notes
1	6	Egor Kuznetsov	Russia	52.74	Q
2	5	Kion Joseph	Barbados	53.57	Q
3	7	Mustafa Amer Shaheen	Iraq	53.78	Q, PB
4	1	Clément François	France	54.26	
5	4	Cristian Rosa	Portugal	55.00	PB
6	3	Han Se-hyun	South Korea	57.64	
7	2	Ouadie El Ouazzani	Morocco	58.15	

=== Heat 4 ===
Rank	Lane	Name	Nationality	Time	Notes
1	3	Shota Madokoro	Japan	53.46	Q, PB
2	2	Christiaan Mouton	South Africa	53.52	Q
3	4	Nimet Sen	Turkey	53.93	Q
4	5	Sten Ütsmüts	Estonia	54.84	PB
5	1	Carlos Tabara	Ecuador	56.28	
6	7	Azim Abdullaev	Tajikistan	56.94	SB
7	6	Omar Abdulla Al Jassim	Qatar	57.24	

=== Heat 5 ===
Rank	Lane	Name	Nationality	Time	Notes
1	8	Ramfis Vega	Puerto Rico	52.57	Q, PB
2	2	Takahiro Matsumoto	Japan	53.42	Q, PB
3	4	Tramaine Maloney	Barbados	53.53	Q, SB
4	5	Ali Khamis	Bahrain	54.27	PB
5	6	Lahiru Jumani	Sri Lanka	54.42	
6	7	Christian Lozada	Ecuador	54.69	
7	1	Juan Antonio Moraques	Spain	54.78	
-	3	Sid-Ali Khedim	Algeria	DNF	

=== Heat 6 ===
Rank	Lane	Name	Nationality	Time	Notes
1	7	Ibrahim Mohammed Saleh	Saudi Arabia	51.71	Q, PB
2	2	Omar McLeod	Jamaica	51.74	Q, PB
3	4	Constant Pretorius	South Africa	52.30	Q
4	1	Dylan Dimock	Canada	52.76	q, PB
5	6	Markus Loftås	Norway	53.22	q, PB
6	5	Jean Lindsay Emilien	Mauritius	53.90	q, PB
7	3	Kenzi Yedjedd	Algeria	56.03	

== Semifinals ==
Qualification rule: first 2 of each heat (Q) plus the 2 fastest times (q) qualified.

=== Heat 1 ===
Rank	Lane	Name	Nationality	Time	Notes
1	4	Takahiro Matsumoto	Japan	52.20	Q, PB
2	5	Ramfis Vega	Puerto Rico	52.42	Q, PB
3	3	Durgesh Kumar	India	52.96	
4	6	Chiebonam Mba	Nigeria	53.13	PB
5	8	Tramaine Maloney	Barbados	53.26	SB
6	7	Mustafa Amer Shaheen	Iraq	53.67	PB
7	2	Markus Loftås	Norway	54.10	
8	1	Gerald Drummond	Costa Rica	54.65	

=== Heat 2 ===
Rank	Lane	Name	Nationality	Time	Notes
1	8	Constant Pretorius	South Africa	51.57	Q, PB
2	5	Ibrahim Mohammed Saleh	Saudi Arabia	51.59	Q, PB
3	3	Shota Madokoro	Japan	51.72	q, PB
4	6	Omar McLeod	Jamaica	51.91	q
5	4	Kion Joseph	Barbados	52.77	PB
6	1	Dylan Dimock	Canada	53.40	
7	7	Nimet Sen	Turkey	53.79	
8	2	Oleksiy Matskevych	Ukraine	54.09	PB

=== Heat 3 ===
Rank	Lane	Name	Nationality	Time	Notes
1	6	Egor Kuznetsov	Russia	51.31	Q, PB
2	7	Ken Kirui Tele	Kenya	51.92	Q, PB
3	3	Jonathan Russell	United States	52.06	
4	1	Riadh Sayeh	Tunisia	52.18	PB
5	5	Yahya Ibrahim Barnawi	Saudi Arabia	52.48	
6	4	Christiaan Mouton	South Africa	52.54	
7	8	Mattia Contini	Italy	53.75	
8	2	Jean Lindsay Emilien	Mauritius	53.88	PB

== Final ==
Rank	Lane	Name	Nationality	Time	Notes
1st place, gold medalist(s)	3	Egor Kuznetsov	Russia	50.97	WYL
2nd place, silver medalist(s)	5	Ibrahim Mohammed Saleh	Saudi Arabia	51.14	PB
3rd place, bronze medalist(s)	4	Takahiro Matsumoto	Japan	51.26	PB
4	8	Ken Kirui Tele	Kenya	51.33	PB
5	6	Constant Pretorius	South Africa	51.34	PB
6	7	Ramfis Vega	Puerto Rico	51.50	PB
7	1	Shota Madokoro	Japan	51.77	
8	2	Omar McLeod	Jamaica	52.82	
