= Gleneve Grange =

Jamaican athletics competitor

Personal information
- Born: 6 July 1995 (age 31) Kingston, Jamaica
- Education: New Mexico Junior College; Florida State University
- Height: 1.70 m (5 ft 7 in)
- Weight: 81 kg (179 lb)

Sport
- Sport: Athletics
- Event: Shot put
- College team: Florida State Seminoles

Gleneve Taletia Grange (born 6 July 1995) is a Jamaican athlete specialising in the shot put. She represented her country at the 2017 World Championships without qualifying for the final.

Her personal bests in the event are 17.29 metres outdoors (Atlanta 2017) and 16.54 metres indoors (South Bend 2017).

== International competitions ==
Year	Competition	Venue	Position	Event	Notes
Representing Jamaica
2010	CARIFTA Games (U17)	George Town, Cayman Islands	1st	Shot put	11.46 m
2010	CARIFTA Games (U17)	George Town, Cayman Islands	2nd	Discus throw	34.57 m
2010	CARIFTA Games (U17)	George Town, Cayman Islands	3rd	Javelin throw	31.27 m
2010	Central American and Caribbean; Junior Championships (U17)	Santo Domingo, Dominican Republic	3rd	Shot put	11.25 m
2011	CARIFTA Games (U17)	Montego Bay, Jamaica	1st	Shot put	12.38 m
2011	CARIFTA Games (U17)	Montego Bay, Jamaica	1st	Discus throw	40.98 m
2011	CARIFTA Games (U17)	Montego Bay, Jamaica	1st	Javelin throw	35.36 m
2011	CARIFTA Games (U17)	Montego Bay, Jamaica	3rd	Pentathlon	3321 pts
2011	NACAC Combined Events Championships	Kingston, Jamaica	13th	Heptathlon	4331 pts
2011	World Youth Championships	Lille, France	–	Heptathlon (youth)	DNF
2012	CARIFTA Games (U20)	Hamilton, Bermuda	2nd	Shot put	12.83 m
2012	CARIFTA Games (U20)	Hamilton, Bermuda	2nd	Discus throw	45.63 m
2012	CARIFTA Games (U20)	Hamilton, Bermuda	1st	Pentathlon	3292 pts
2012	Central American and Caribbean; Junior Championships (U20)	San Salvador, El Salvador	1st	Shot put	15.04 m
2012	Central American and Caribbean; Junior Championships (U20)	San Salvador, El Salvador	2nd	Discus throw	46.51 m
2012	Central American and Caribbean; Junior Championships (U20)	San Salvador, El Salvador	2nd	Javelin throw	37.46 m
2013	CARIFTA Games (U20)	Nassau, Bahamas	2nd	Shot put	13.02 m
2013	CARIFTA Games (U20)	Nassau, Bahamas	1st	Discus throw	47.95 m
2013	CARIFTA Games (U20)	Nassau, Bahamas	1st	Pentathlon	3628 pts
2014	World Junior Championships	Eugene, United States	22nd (q)	Shot put	13.95 m
2014	Pan American Sports Festival	Mexico City, Mexico	10th	Shot put	13.35 m
2014	Pan American Sports Festival	Mexico City, Mexico	8th	Discus throw	52.69 m
2017	World Championships	London, United Kingdom	29th (q)	Shot put	15.96 m
2018	Central American and Caribbean Games	Barranquilla, Colombia	7th	Shot put	15.73 m
