= Jonathan Farinha =

Trinidadian sprinter

Personal information
- Nationality: Trinidad and Tobago
- Born: 16 May 1996 (age 30)

Sport
- Sport: Running
- Event: Sprints

Achievements and titles
- Personal best(s): 100 m: 10.50 (Port of Spain 2012); 200 m: 21.16 (San Salvador 2012)
Medal record
Men's athletics
Representing Trinidad & Tobago
CARIFTA Games (Youth)
Gold medal – first place	2012 Hamilton	200 m
Bronze medal – third place	2012 Hamilton	4×100 m relay
Silver medal – second place	2012 Hamilton	4×400 m relay
Silver medal – second place	2011 Montego Bay	4×100 m relay
Silver medal – second place	2011 Montego Bay	4×400 m relay

Jonathan Jabari Farinha (born 16 May 1996) is a Trinidadian sprinter.

He finished fourth in the boys' 200 metres at the 2012 Central American and Caribbean Junior Championships, in a personal best of 21.16 seconds. He currently attends the University of Technology Jamaica where he trains.
