= O'Jay Ferguson =

Jamaican born sprinter

Personal information
- Nationality: Bahamas
- Born: 17 October 1993 (age 32)

Sport
- Sport: Running
- Event: Sprints

Achievements and titles
- Personal best: 400 m: 46.14 (El Paso 2012)
Medal record
Men's athletics
Representing the Bahamas
Commonwealth Games
| Silver medal – second place | 2018 Gold Coast | 4 × 400 m relay |
CAC Championships
| Silver medal – second place | 2013 Morelia | 4×400 m relay |
NACAC Championships
| Silver medal – second place | 2018 Toronto | 4x400m relay |
CARIFTA Games (Junior)
| Gold medal – first place | 2011 Montego Bay | 400 m |
| Gold medal – first place | 2012 Hamilton | 400 m |
| Gold medal – first place | 2012 Hamilton | 4×400 m relay |
| Silver medal – second place | 2010 George Town | 4×400 m relay |

O'Jay Ferguson (born 17 October 1993) is a Jamaican born Bahamian sprinter . He attended Western Texas College in Snyder, Texas.

On 24 March 2012, Ferguson ran a personal best 46.14 sec 400 metres at the UTEP Springtime Invitational in El Paso, Texas, which would have improved the Bahamian national junior record set by Troy McIntosh in 1992, if it wasn't for Ferguson's unclear citizenship status. As of May 2012, Ferguson's time ranks fourth in the world among juniors, behind only Aldrich Bailey, Steven Solomon, and Luguelín Santos.

Ferguson attended C. R. Walker High School in New Providence, The Bahamas.

Ferguson represented the Bahamas in 4 × 400 metres relay at the 2013 and 2017 World Championships.

Ferguson spouse: Mia Smith in 2021
