= Sonia Gaskin =

Barbadian middle-distance runner

Personal information
- Born: 4 October 1994 (age 31)
- Education: Kansas State University

Sport
- Sport: Athletics
- Event: 800 metres
- College team: Kansas State Wildcats

Sonia Gaskin (born 4 October 1994) is a Bajan middle-distance runner specialising in the 800 metres. She won a bronze medal at the 2018 Central American and Caribbean Games. In addition, she won multiple medals in regional age group competitions.

== Career ==
Gaskin attended Parkinson Memorial Secondary School. In 2012, she became the first female athlete to win the 400 metres, 800 m, 1500 metres, and 3000 metres at the Barbados Secondary Schools Athletics Championships.

Gaskin was an All-American runner for the Kansas State Wildcats track and field team under their coach Mike Smith, finishing 7th in the 800 m at the 2014 NCAA Division I Outdoor Track and Field Championships.

Gaskin is the Bajan record-holder over 1500 metres. She continued to be coached by Mike Smith after he left Kansas State.

Gaskin also competed for the York University track and field club in Ontario, Canada under their coach Raymond Rudder.

== Personal life ==
Gaskin is a Chrisitan. She wanted to be a paediatrician, and aimed to use track and field scholarships to enter that field.

== International competitions ==
Year	Competition	Venue	Position	Event	Notes
Representing Barbados
2009	CARIFTA Games (U17)	Vieux Fort, Saint Lucia	6th	400 m	56.52
2009	CARIFTA Games (U17)	Vieux Fort, Saint Lucia	3rd	800 m	2:13.80
2009	CARIFTA Games (U17)	Vieux Fort, Saint Lucia	4th	4 × 400 m relay	3:53.34
2010	CARIFTA Games (U17)	George Town, Cayman Islands	3rd	800 m	2:13.60
2010	Central American and Caribbean; Junior Championships (U17)	Santo Domingo, Dominican Republic	4th	400 m	56.60
2010	Central American and Caribbean; Junior Championships (U17)	Santo Domingo, Dominican Republic	3rd	800 m	2:14.42
2011	CARIFTA Games (U20)	Montego Bay, Jamaica	2nd	800 m	2:11.69
2011	CARIFTA Games (U20)	Montego Bay, Jamaica	7th	1500 m	4:58.11
2011	World Youth Championships	Lille, France	32nd (h)	800 m	2:14.66
2011	Pan American Junior Championships	Miramar, United States	6th	800 m	2:14.41
2011	Commonwealth Youth Games	Douglas, Isle of Man	7th (h)	800 m	2:19.10
2012	CARIFTA Games (U20)	Hamilton, Bermuda	3rd	800 m	2:14.54
2012	CARIFTA Games (U20)	Hamilton, Bermuda	5th	1500 m	4:58.42
2012	CARIFTA Games (U20)	Hamilton, Bermuda	3rd	4 × 400 m relay	3:50.54
2012	Central American and Caribbean; Junior Championships (U20)	San Salvador, El Salvador	6th	800 m	2:10.88
2013	CARIFTA Games (U20)	Nassau, Bahamas	2nd	800 m	2:06.84
2013	CARIFTA Games (U20)	Nassau, Bahamas	2nd	4 × 400 m relay	3:41.89
2015	Pan American Games	Toronto, Canada	12th (h)	800 m	2:09.01
2015	NACAC Championships	San José, Costa Rica	8th	800 m	2:10.86
2016	NACAC U23 Championships	San Salvador, El Salvador	7th	400 m	54.86
2016	NACAC U23 Championships	San Salvador, El Salvador	7th	800 m	2:10.63
2018	Central American and Caribbean Games	Barranquilla, Colombia	3rd	800 m	2:03.13
2018	NACAC Championships	Toronto, Canada	9th	800 m	2:06.54
2019	Pan American Games	Lima, Peru	8th	800 m	2:05.68
2022	NACAC Championships	Freeport, Bahamas	7th	800 m	2:07.35
2023	Central American and Caribbean Games	San Salvador, El Salvador	4th	800 m	2:05.50
2023	Pan American Games	Santiago, Chile	9th (h)	800 m	2:08.14

== Personal bests ==
Outdoor

- 400 metres – 52.72 (Lubbock 2014)
- 800 metres – 2:02.60 (Toronto 2019)
- 1500 metres – 4:26.37 (Toronto 2019)

Indoor

- 400 metres – 54.67 (Albuquerque 2014)
- 800 metres – 2:07.80 (Fayetteville 2015)
- 1000 metres – 2:50.99 (Toronto 2019)
