= Ian Kerr (sprinter) =

Bahamian athlete (born 1996)

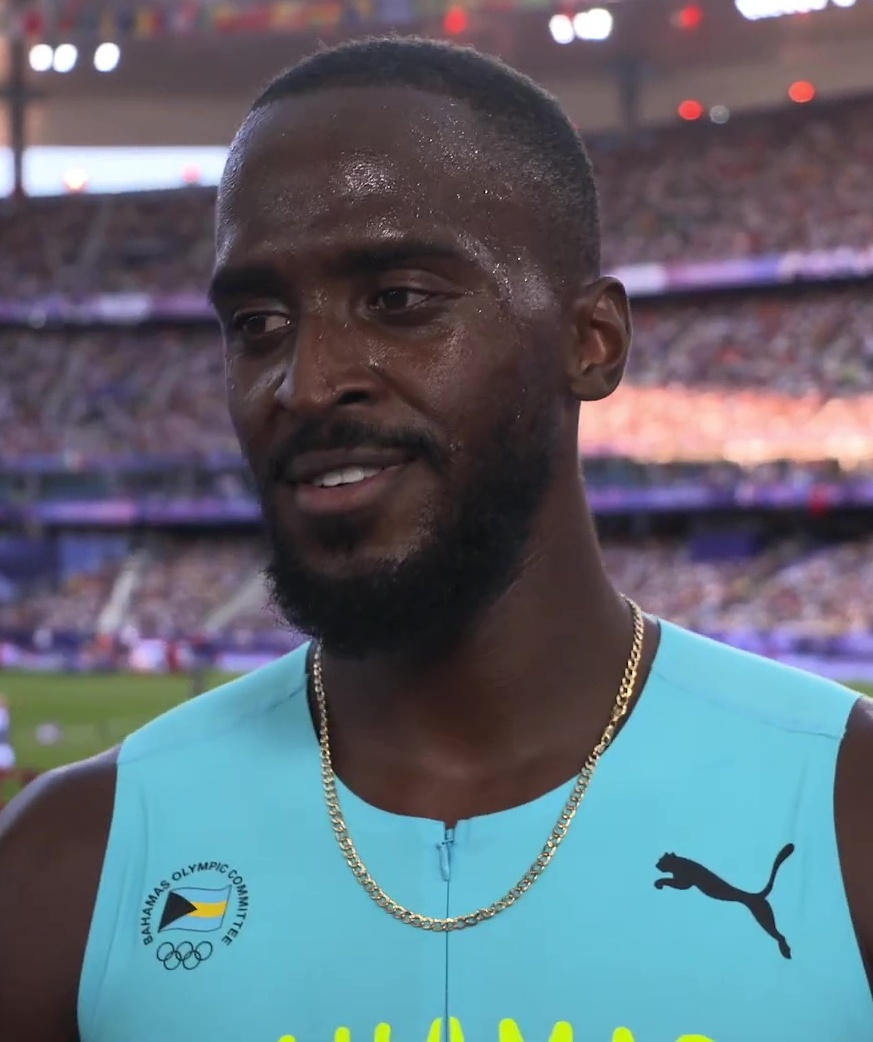

Personal information
- Nationality: Bahamian
- Born: 1 May 1996 (age 30)

Sport
- Sport: Athletics
- Event: Sprint

Achievements and titles
- Personal bests: 100m: 10.14 (2022); 200m: 20.33 (2024)
Medal record
Men's athletics
Representing the (The Bahamas) Bahamas
NACAC Championships
Bronze medal – third place	2025 Freeport	4 × 100 m relay
NACAC U23 Championships
Bronze medal – third place	2016 San Salvador	200 m
Bronze medal – third place	2016 San Salvador	4×100 m relay

Ian Kerr (born 1 May 1996) is a Bahamian sprinter. He is a multiple time national champion over 200 metres.

== Career ==
Kerr was a bronze medalist in the 200 metres and 4 × 100 m relay at the U23 North American Central American and Caribbean Athletics Championship in July 2016 in San Salvador.

He ran at the 2024 World Relays Championships in Nassau, Bahamas. He ran a personal best 20.33 seconds for the 200 metres at the Meeting de la Martinique, at the Stade L. Achille, in Fort-de-France, Martinique, in May 2024.

He won his fifth Bahamian national title in June 2024. He competed in the 200m at the 2024 Paris Olympics.

In September 2025, he competed in the 200 metres at the 2025 World Championships in Tokyo, Japan.

== Personal life ==
From Nassau, Bahamas, Kerr attended Queen's College School. He went on to study at Western Texas College and graduated from Adams State University in 2019 with a bachelor's degree in mass communications.
