= Carmiesha Cox =

Bahamian sprinter and hurdler

Personal information
- Nationality: Bahamas
- Born: 16 May 1995 (age 31) The Bahamas

Sport
- Sport: Running
- Events: 100 metres, 200 metres,
Medal record
Women's athletics
Representing the Bahamas
Pan American Junior Championships
Gold medal – first place	2011 Miramar	4×100 m relay
CAC Junior Championships (Youth)
Gold medal – first place	2012 San Salvador	100 m
Silver medal – second place	2012 San Salvador	200 m
Silver medal – second place	2012 San Salvador	4×100 m relay
CARIFTA Games (Junior)
Gold medal – first place	2012 Hamilton	4×100 m relay
Gold medal – first place	2013 Nassau	4×100 m relay
Silver medal – second place	2012 Hamilton	100 m
Silver medal – second place	2013 Nassau	100 m
Bronze medal – third place	2013 Nassau	200 m
CARIFTA Games (Youth)
Gold medal – first place	2011 Montego Bay	200 m
Silver medal – second place	2011 Montego Bay	4×100 m relay

Carmiesha Cox (born 16 May 1995) is a Bahamian sprinter and hurdler who attended Purdue University. She was part of a gold medal-winning Bahamian team at the 2011 Pan American Junior Athletics Championships. She also ran the third leg of the 4x400 metres Relay at the 2016 Olympic Games.

== Early life ==
Carmiesha Arecta Anna Cox was born to Carmen and Dwight Cox. She has four siblings - three older brothers and one older sister. Cox attended high school at Aquinas College. She later attended Purdue University, from 2014 to 2018, where she majored in business management.
