= 2012 CARIFTA Games =

XLI CARIFTA Games
- Dates: 6–9 April
- Host city: Hamilton, Bermuda
- Venue: Bermuda National Stadium
- Level: Junior and Youth
- Events: 66 (35 junior (incl. 4 open), 31 youth)
- Participation: about 409 + 10 guests (221 junior + 6 guests, 188 youth + 4 guests) athletes from 24 + 1 guest nation nations

The 2012 CARIFTA Games were held in the Bermuda National Stadium in Hamilton, Bermuda between April 6—9, 2012, the fourth time in which the event was held in Bermuda. The other years being 1975, 1980, 2004. A detailed analysis of the results and an appreciation of the games has been given elsewhere.

== Records ==
A total of 9 new games records were set.

== Austin Sealy Award ==
The Austin Sealy Trophy for the most outstanding athlete of the games was awarded to Anthonique Strachan of the Bahamas.

== Medal summary ==
Complete results can be found on World-Track, on the World Junior Athletics History website, and on the original games websites.

=== Boys under 20 (Junior) ===
Event	Gold		Silver		Bronze	
100 metres^{*} (5.7 m/s)	Jazeel Murphy (JAM)	10.31 w	Shane Jones (BAH)	10.41 w	Zharnel Hughes (AIA)	10.41 w
200 metres (0.5 m/s)	Delano Williams (TCA)	20.83	Blake Bartlett (BAH)	21.08	Teray Smith (BAH)	21.18
400 metres	O'Jay Ferguson (BAH)	47.32	Macel Cedenio (TRI)	47.93	Lennox Williams (JAM)	48.53
800 metres	Mark London (TRI)	1:55.65	Shaquille Dill (BER)	1:55.91	Andre Colebrook (BAH)	1:56.66
1500 metres	Orane Wint (JAM)	4:06.05	Marbeq Edgar (LCA)	4:06.34	Mark London (TRI)	4:09.64
5000 metres	Orane Wint (JAM)	15:27.05	Nicholas Landeau (TRI)	15:54.64	Juma Mouchette (BER)	16:13.41
110 metres hurdles (1.1 m/s)	(Guadeloupe) /Wilhem Belocian (GLP)	13.63	Stefan Fennell (JAM)	13.66	Yanick Hart (JAM)	13.88
400 metres hurdles	Omar McLeod (JAM)	52.35	Shavon Barnes (JAM)	52.75	Tramaine Maloney (BAR)	53.83
High jump	Ryan Ingraham (BAH)	2.11	Ashani Wright (JAM)	2.08	Kivarno Handfield (TCA)	2.05
Pole vault	Xavier Boland (JAM)	4.40	Shem Edwards (LCA)	4.05	Tre Adderley (BAH)	3.45
Long jump	(Martinique) /Jean-Noël Cretinoir (MTQ)	7.36 (0.7 m/s)	Keniel Grant (JAM)	7.26 (0.0 m/s)	Atiba Wright (TRI)	7.22 (1.6 m/s)
Triple jump	Latario Collie-Minns (BAH)	16.35 (−1.0 m/s)	Lathone Collie-Minns (BAH)	15.55 (−0.8 m/s)	(Martinique) /Jean-Noël Cretinoir (MTQ)	15.38 (−1.2 m/s)
Shot put	Ashinia Miller (JAM)	18.96	Emmanuel Onyia (JAM)	18.89	Hezekiel Romeo (TRI)	17.95
Discus throw	Fedrick Dacres (JAM)	58.57	(French Guiana) /Dean-Nick Allen (GUF)	53.50	Ashinia Miller (JAM)	50.37
Javelin throw	Keshorn Walcott (TRI)	77.59	Nicolia Bovell (BAR)	66.44	Janeil Craigg (BAR)	65.50
Heptathlon	Lindon Toussaint (GRN)	4572	Darron Hunter (JAM)	4508	Klode Thompson (BAR)	4425
4 × 100 metres relay	Bahamas; Teray Smith; Blake Bartlett; Johnathan Farquharson; Shane Jones	40.42	Jamaica; Keniel Grant; Jevaughn Minzie; Odail Todd; Yanick Hart	40.72	Turks and Caicos Islands; Ifeanyi Otuonye; Delano Williams; Angelo Garland; Shyon Parker	41.48
4 × 400 metres relay	Bahamas; Julian Munroe; Elroy McBride; Stephen Newbold; O'Jay Ferguson	3:09.23	Trinidad and Tobago; Asa Guevara; Macel Cedenio; Kern Alexis; Jereem Richards	3:11.62	Jamaica; Javon Francis; Omar McLeod; Shavon Barnes; Lennox Williams	3:12.48

: Open event for both junior and youth athletes.

^{*}: Initially, Jevaughn Minzie of Jamaica came in second in 10.33s. However, following a protest of the Bahamas and Anguilla, he was disqualified for a false start.

=== Girls under 20 (Junior) ===
Event	Gold		Silver		Bronze	
100 metres (4.4 m/s)	Anthonique Strachan (BAH)	11.22 w	Carmiesha Cox (BAH)	11.54 w	Monique Spencer (JAM)	11.71 w
200 metres (−0.7 m/s)	Anthonique Strachan (BAH)	22.85 CR	Shaunae Miller (BAH)	23.18	Shericka Jackson (JAM)	24.03
400 metres	Rashan Brown (BAH)	54.92	Olivia James (JAM)	55.35	Genekee Leith (JAM)	56.68
800 metres	Simoya Campbell (JAM)	2:08.48	Teshon Adderley (BAH)	2:12.45	Sonia Gaskin (BAR)	2:14.54
1500 metres	Simoya Campbell (JAM)	4:49.56	(Guadeloupe) /Magalie Penelope (GLP)	4:53.13	Taylor-Ashley Bean (BER)	4:53.14
3000 metres	Aleithia McLaughlin (JAM)	10:16.80	Taylor-Ashley Bean (BER)	10:22.82	Marleena Eubanks (JAM)	10:29.67
100 metres hurdles (0.7 m/s)	Sade-Mariah Greenidge (BAR)	13.61	Chrisdale McCarthy (JAM)	13.62	Shakera Hall (BAR)	13.89
400 metres hurdles	Janieve Russell (JAM)	58.80	Kernesha Spann (TRI)	1:00.23	Terrian Williams (JAM)	1:00.49
High jump	Kimberly Williamson (JAM)	1.82	Akela Jones (BAR)	1.80	Jeannelle Scheper (LCA)	1.80
Long jump	Akela Jones (BAR)	6.18 (0.9 m/s)	Janieve Russell (JAM)	5.86 (−0.4 m/s)	Claudette Allen (JAM)	5.85 (0.4 m/s)
Triple jump	Sabina Allen (JAM)	12.18 (−1.1 m/s)	Tamara Myers (BAH)	11.62 (−1.4 m/s)	Anthonique Butler (BAH)	11.43 (1.6 m/s)
Shot put	Racquel Williams (BAH)	13.08	Gleneve Grange (JAM)	12.83	(Martinique) /Catherine Mastail (MTQ)	12.78
Discus throw	Tara-Sue Barnett (JAM)	49.62	Gleneve Grange (JAM)	45.63	Leah Bannister (BAR)	41.99
Javelin throw	(French Guiana) /Alexie Alaïs (GUF)	47.17	(Martinique) /Sandrine Mezen (MTQ)	44.56	Alexandria Paul (BAH)	32.62
Pentathlon	Gleneve Grange (JAM)	3292	Sharnique Leonce (LCA)	3035	Dee-Ann Rogers (AIA)	2829
4 × 100 metres relay	Bahamas; Devynne Charlton; Carmiesha Cox; Rashan Brown; Anthonique Strachan	45.02	Jamaica; Shawnette Lewin; Monique Spencer; Cardine Copeland; Shericka Jackson	45.18	Barbados; Sade-Mariah Greenidge; Shakera Hall; Ariel Jackson; Akela Jones	46.39
4 × 400 metres relay	Jamaica; Genekee Leith; Simoya Campbell; Janieve Russell; Olivia James	3:34.27	Bahamas; Rashan Brown; Katrina Seymour; Rhoneshia Johnson; Shaunae Miller	3:40.44	Barbados; Ariel Jackson; Sonia Gaskin; Shani Adams; Shakera Hall	3:50.54

: Open event for both junior and youth athletes.

=== Boys under 17 (Youth) ===
Event	Gold		Silver		Bronze	
100 metres (3.6 m/s)	Cliff Resias (BAH)	10.67 w	Michael O'Hara (JAM)	10.68 w	Nicholas Douglas (TRI)	10.69 w
200 metres (−0.5 m/s)	Jonathan Farinha (TRI)	21.28	Cliff Resias (BAH)	22.06	Mario Burke (BAR)	22.23
400 metres	Janeko Cartwright (BAH)	50.04	Ivan Henry (JAM)	50.69	Devaughn Baker (JAM)	50.75
800 metres	Ricardo McKenzie (JAM)	2:02.73	Orville Dixon (JAM)	2:02.98	Raheem Skinner (BAR)	2:03.03
1500 metres	Webston Pennant (JAM)	4:18.92	Orville Dixon (JAM)	4:20.38	Pius Emilien (BAR)	4:23.73
3000 metres	Webston Pennant (JAM)	9:23.13	Kenneth Benjamin (ATG)	9:28.76	Darren Young (BAH)	9:54.94
110 metres hurdles (0.8 m/s)	Jaheel Hyde (JAM)	13.96	Michael O'Hara (JAM)	13.97	Xavier Coakley (BAH)	14.14
400 metres hurdles	Okeen Williams (JAM)	53.15	Marvin Williams (JAM)	54.96	D'Mitry Charlton (BAH)	54.99
High jump	Christoff Bryan (JAM)	2.05	Clairvon Kelly (SKN)	1.90	LaQuan Nairn (BAH)	1.90
Long jump	Andwuelle Wright (TRI)	6.84 (−0.1 m/s)	Given Gibson (JAM)	6.78 (−0.3 m/s)	LaQuan Nairn (BAH)	6.66 (0.2 m/s)
Triple jump^{**}	Justin Donawa (BER)	14.63 (1.6 m/s)	Given Gibson (JAM)	14.56 (1.2 m/s)	Christoff Bryan (JAM)	14.25 (0.5 m/s)
Shot put	Demar Gayle (JAM)	17.31	Kenejah Williams (TRI)	16.75	Drexel Maycock (BAH)	15.67
Discus throw	Kenejah Williams (TRI)	50.36	Drexel Maycock (BAH)	45.35	Shamar Kitson (JAM)	44.34
Javelin throw	Anderson Peters (GRN)	60.50	Mickel Joseph (GRN)	59.45	Denzel Pratt (BAH)	59.33
4 × 100 metres relay	Jamaica; Xandre Blake; Okeen Williams; Karey Kelly; Michael O'Hara	41.64	Bahamas; Theotis Johnson; Janeko Cartwright; Ian Kerr; Cliff Resias	41.98	Trinidad and Tobago; Ron Wright; Jonathan Farinha; Jamell Dacon; Andwuelle Wright	42.01
4 × 400 metres relay	Jamaica; Ivan Henry; Okeen Williams; Michael O'Hara; Devaughn Baker	3:14.52	Trinidad and Tobago; Jamoul Pierre; Jonathan Farinha; Aaron Andrews; Nathan Farinha	3:21.61	Barbados; Akeem Mccollin; Ariko Small; Mario Burke; Ramarco Thompson	3:22.86

^{**}: Miguel van Assen from Suriname finished second in triple jump reaching 14.57m (0.6 m/s); However, he was not entitled to win a medal (see below).

=== Girls under 17 (Youth) ===
Event	Gold		Silver		Bronze	
100 metres (4.6 m/s)	Shauna Helps (JAM)	11.66 w	Nelda Huggins (IVB)	11.77 w	Saqukine Cameron (JAM)	11.90 w
200 metres (0.8 m/s)	Luan Gabriel (DMA)	24.35	Saqukine Cameron (JAM)	24.51	Aneka Brissett (JAM)	24.79
400 metres	Yanique McNeil (JAM)	55.82	Juannae Lewis (BAH)	57.64	(Guadeloupe) /Sareena Carti (GLP)	57.75
800 metres	Tiffany James (JAM)	2:18.11	Chantai Smith (JAM)	2:18.26	Lakeisha Warner (IVB)	2:18.28
1500 metres	Chantai Smith (JAM)	4:51.36	Faheemah Scraders (BER)	4:55.46	Andrea Foster (GUY)	4:57.28
100 metres hurdles (0.3 m/s)	Yanique Thompson (JAM)	13.67	Jeminise Parris (TRI)	14.30	(Guadeloupe) /Elsa Plante (GLP)	14.43
300 metres hurdles	Mesha Newbold (BAH)	43.98	Jeminise Parris (TRI)	44.69	Andrenette Knight (JAM)	44.76
High jump	Jehvania Whyte (JAM)	1.60	Nargélis Statie (CUR)	1.60	Samara Spencer (JAM)	1.55
Long jump	Dannielle Gibson (BAH)	5.89 (1.0 m/s)	Samara Spencer (JAM)	5.87 (−0.1 m/s)	Tamara Moncrieffe (JAM)	5.79 (−0.5 m/s)
Triple jump	(Guadeloupe) /Yannis David (GLP)	12.73 w (2.4 m/s)	(Guadeloupe) /Marine Vidal (GLP)	12.21 w (3.2 m/s)	Tamara Moncrieffe (JAM)	11.57 (1.5 m/s)
Shot put	Chelsea James (TRI)	14.02	Trevia Gumbs (IVB)	13.47	Protious Warren (TRI)	13.00
Discus throw	Paul-Ann Gayle (JAM)	43.99	Venique Harris (JAM)	38.93	Shaiann Charles (TRI)	38.15
Javelin throw	Tynelle Gumbs (IVB)	41.46	Akidah Briggs (TRI)	37.64	Shanee Angol (DMA)	35.71
4 × 100 metres relay	Jamaica; Saqukine Cameron; Yanique Thompson; Samara Spencer; Shauna Helps	46.52	Bahamas; Kadeisha Hield; Juannae Lewis; Makeya White; Keianna Albury	46.66	British Virgin Islands; Jonel Lacey; Deya Erickson; Lakeisha Warner; Nelda Huggins	48.22
4 × 400 metres relay	Jamaica; Chantai Smith; Yanique McNeil; Semoy Hemmings; Tiffany James	3:44.64	Bahamas; Juannae Lewis; Geordinell Thurston; Mesha Newbold; Dreshanae Rolle	3:51.45	Barbados; Allana Ince; Tia-Adana Belle; Danielle Scantlebury; Tiana Bowen	3:56.87

== Medal table (unofficial) ==
The unofficial count is in accordance with the medal count published elsewhere.

* Host nation (Bermuda)

Rank	Nation	Gold	Silver	Bronze	Total
1	Jamaica	34	25	19	78
2	Bahamas	14	14	12	40
3	Trinidad and Tobago	6	9	7	22
4	Barbados	2	2	13	17
5	/Guadeloupe	2	2	2	6
6	Grenada	2	1	0	3
7	Bermuda*	1	3	2	6
8	British Virgin Islands	1	2	2	5
9	/Martinique	1	1	2	4
10	/French Guiana	1	1	0	2
11	Turks and Caicos Islands	1	0	2	3
12	Dominica	1	0	1	2
13	Saint Lucia	0	3	1	4
14	Antigua and Barbuda	0	1	0	1
14	Curaçao	0	1	0	1
14	Saint Kitts and Nevis	0	1	0	1
17	Anguilla	0	0	2	2
18	Guyana	0	0	1	1
Totals (18 entries)		66	66	66	198

== Participation (unofficial) ==
Detailed result lists can be found on World-Track, on the World Junior Athletics History website, and on the original games websites. The games saw the first appearance of athletes representing Bonaire after dissolution of the Netherlands Antilles. Athletes from Suriname were treated as guests (see below). An unofficial count yields the number of about 419 athletes, including 10 guests (227 junior (under-20) including 6 guests and 192 youth (under-17) including 4 guests) from about 24 countries + 1 guest country (athletes marked as "unattached" in the original result lists):

- Anguilla (4)
- Antigua and Barbuda (6)
- Aruba (4)
- Bahamas (71)
- Barbados (35)
- Bermuda (53)
- /Bonaire (2)
- British Virgin Islands (16)
- Cayman Islands (5)
- Curaçao (7)
- Dominica (4)
- /French Guiana (5)
- Grenada (9)
- /Guadeloupe (13)
- Guyana (7)
- Jamaica (71)
- /Martinique (9)
- Montserrat (3)
- Saint Kitts and Nevis (13)
- Saint Lucia (9)
- Sint Maarten (1)
- Trinidad and Tobago (44)
- Turks and Caicos Islands (14)
- U.S. Virgin Islands (4)
- Suriname^{***} (10)

^{***}: Guest athletes (see below).

=== Suriname ===
There was an ongoing dispute between the Surinamese officials Robby Rijssel and Delano Landvreugd, both gentlemen claiming to lead the Surinamese Athletiek Bond and to represent Suriname at the IAAF. As a result of this, two different delegations independently tried to register groups of athletes for the games. Alain Jean-Pierre from Haïti, board member of both the North American, Central American and Caribbean Athletic Association (NACAC) and the Central American and Caribbean Athletic Confederation (CACAC), explained that normally both groups would have to be suspended from the games following the rules. Nevertheless, there was a joint decision by the NACAC, the CACAC, and the local organizing committee in favour of the young athletes: all of them from both delegations were allowed to compete at the games, but they were treated only as guest athletes and appeared in the result lists as "unattached", rather than from Suriname. As a consequence, the athletes could not participate in the parade of the opening ceremony, and they were not considered to be eligible for winning medals. The victim of the argument between the Surinamese officials was 15-year-old triple jumper Miguel van Assen who came in second in his category, but was not entitled to receive the silver medal.
