= Akela Jones =

Barbadian athlete

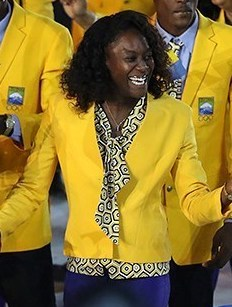
- Jones in 2016

Personal information
- Born: 22 April 1995 (age 31) Saint Michael, Barbados
- Height: 1.88 m (6 ft 2 in)
- Weight: 77 kg (170 lb)

Sport
- Country: Barbados
- Events: Heptathlon; High jump Long jump
- College team: Oklahoma Baptist Bison; Kansas State Wildcats
- Coached by: Cliff Rovelto

Achievements and titles
- Personal bests: Heptathlon: 6371w/6303 NR (2015); Long jump: 6.80i NR (2016); High jump: 1.98 NR (2015); 100 m hurdles: 13.00 (2016); Pentathlon: 4402i NR (2015)
Medal record
World Junior Championships
Gold medal – first place	2014 Eugene	Long jump
Pan American Games
Bronze medal – third place	2015 Toronto	High jump
NACAC U23
Silver medal – second place	2016 San Salvador	Long jump
Gold medal – first place	2016 San Salvador	High jump
	2016 San Salvador	100 m hurdles
- Updated on 26 July 2015

Akela Jones (born 22 April 1995) is a Barbadian track and field athlete who holds Barbadian records in the women's heptathlon, pentathlon, long jump and high jump. She won gold in the long jump at the 2014 World Junior Championships. In 2015, she was NCAA champion in the heptathlon and won bronze in the high jump at the Pan American Games.

== Early career ==
Jones first competed in the CARIFTA Games as a 12-year-old in 2008, winning silver in the under-17 girls' high jump with a jump of 1.71 m. On 20 March 2009 Jones cleared 1.81 m in Bridgetown; as of July 2015, this remains the age 13 world best. At the 2009 CARIFTA Games she repeated her silver from the previous year, clearing 1.80 m to equal the championship record but losing to Jamaica's Petergaye Reid on countback. Jones won her first CARIFTA Games gold medal in 2010, clearing a championship record 1.85 m in the high jump; additionally, she won silver with the Barbadian team in the 4 × 100 metres relay. Later that spring, she became the first Barbadian to win a high school event at the Penn Relays, winning the girls' high jump with 1.81 m.

Jones set a national youth and junior record in the women's long jump, 6.18 m, at the 2011 Barbadian CARIFTA Trials. She won two gold medals at the 2011 CARIFTA Games, winning both the high jump (1.75 m) and the long jump (5.66 m). She was selected for her first global meet, the 2011 World Youth Championships in Lille, as a long jumper; jumping 6.10 m in the qualification and 6.04 m in the final, she placed sixth.

In 2012 Jones competed in the CARIFTA Games as an under-20 athlete for the first time, winning gold in the long jump (6.18 m), silver in the high jump (1.80 m) and bronze in the 4 × 100 m relay. At the CAC Junior Championships she won gold medals in both the long jump (6.36 m) and the high jump (1.81 m); her long jump mark was a new championship record and Barbadian junior record, while her high jump mark equaled the championship record. She competed in the long jump at the 2012 World Junior Championships in Barcelona, but was eliminated in the qualification.

Jones enrolled in Oklahoma Baptist University, a NAIA college, after the 2012 season; she had originally intended to go to the NCAA's Kansas State University, but lacked the course credits. During the 2013 indoor season Jones set Barbadian indoor records in both the high jump (1.85 m) and long jump (6.26 m); at the 2013 NAIA indoor championships she won both events, and additionally placed second in the 60 m hurdles. Jones won four medals at the 2013 CARIFTA Games, winning gold in the under-20 long jump (6.19 m) and silver in the high jump, 100 m hurdles and 4 × 100 m relay. At the NAIA outdoor championships she won the long jump, high jump and 100 m hurdles and placed second in the flat 100 m.

== 2014 ==
Jones set a Barbadian indoor record in women's pentathlon, 4194 points, in Wichita on 31 January 2014. She repeated as NAIA indoor champion in both the high jump and long jump, and also won the pentathlon and 60 m hurdles; in addition, she placed second in the flat 60 m, leading the Oklahoma Baptist women to a team championship. At her final CARIFTA Games appearance in April 2014, Jones won the under-20 women's long jump (6.32 m), high jump (1.84 m) and 100 m hurdles (13.55); she received the Austin Sealy Award as the most outstanding athlete of the meet. The following month, she repeated as NAIA outdoor champion in the long jump, high jump and 100 m hurdles; her winning mark in the long jump (6.55 m) was a new Barbadian record.

At the 2014 World Junior Championships in Eugene, Oregon Jones won gold in the long jump, jumping 6.34 m into a strong headwind; she was the first Barbadian ever to win a World Junior Championship medal. She also qualified for the high jump final, but decided to skip it after the long jump gold to avoid aggravating a minor knee problem. In recognition of her achievements in 2014, Jones was named Barbadian Sportspersonality of the Year.

== 2015 ==
Jones transferred from Oklahoma Baptist to Kansas State University for the 2014–15 season. She had a successful 2015 indoor season, winning the Big 12 Conference long jump title and setting Barbadian indoor records in the long jump (6.64 m) and pentathlon (4402 points); her long jump mark ranked second in the NCAA that year, behind Jenna Prandini of Oregon. At the NCAA indoor championships she placed fourth in the high jump and sixth in the long jump.

Outdoors, Jones made her heptathlon debut at the Jim Click Invitational in Tucson, breaking the Barbadian record with her tally of 6049 points. At the Big 12 outdoor championships she placed second in three events – the 100 m hurdles, high jump and long jump. The second heptathlon of Jones's career was at the 2015 NCAA outdoor championships in Eugene; she won the championship with a wind-aided total of 6371 points, defeating defending champion Kendell Williams of Georgia. Jones's day one score, 4023 points, marked the first time an NCAA heptathlete had reached 4000 points after four events; her two-day total placed her fourth (behind Diane Guthrie-Gresham, Brianne Theisen-Eaton and Jackie Joyner-Kersee) on the collegiate all-time list and broke Austra Skujytė's Kansas State record. In her other event at the NCAA championships, the high jump, Jones equaled her personal best of 1.87 m and placed fourth; the U.S. Track & Field and Cross Country Coaches Association named her Women's National Field Athlete of the Year in NCAA Division I.

In July 2015, Jones represented Barbados at the Pan American Games in Toronto, clearing 1.91 m to win bronze in the women's high jump. In addition, she placed sixth in the long jump with 6.60 m; both marks were new Barbadian outdoor records.

== 2016 ==
Outdoors, Jones made her heptathlon debut at the Mt SAC Relays winning with a score of 6307 in April. Akela Jones won long jump with a jump of 6.75 m (22 ft 1 1/2 in) at Big 12 Conference in May. At Akela's second heptathlon at 2016 NCAA Division I Outdoor Track and Field Championships, she placed third scoring 6063. In July, Jones won high jump at NACAC U23 Championships and placed 2nd and 4th in long jump and 100 m Hurdles. In August, Jones competed in the Olympic heptathlon and high jump. She placed 20th in the heptathlon and did not make the finals for the high jump. She was chosen to serve as flag bearer for Barbados in the Olympic closing ceremonies.

== Personal bests ==
Outdoor

- 100 metres hurdles – 12.94 (2016)
- High jump – 1.95 m (2016)
- Shot put – 14.85 m (2015)
- 200 metres – 23.28 (2016)
- Long jump – 6.75 m (2016)
- Javelin throw – 42.00 m (2016)
- 800 metres – 2:21.62 (2015)
- Heptathlon – 6371 pts (2015)

Indoor

- 60 metres hurdles – 8.00 (2016)
- High jump – 1.98 m (2016)
- Shot put – 14.16m (2014)
- Long jump – 6.80 m (2016)
- 800 metres – 2:25.63 (2016)
- Pentathlon – 4643 pts (2016)

Other bests

- 100 metres – 11.64(2015)

Sporting positions
Preceded by (Canada) Alyxandria Treasure	NACAC Under-23 High jump Champion; 2016	Succeeded by (United States) Nicole Greene
