= Luan Gabriel =

Dominican sprinter

Personal information
- Nationality: Dominica
- Born: 3 May 1996 (age 30) Dominica

Sport
- Sport: Running
- Event(s): 100 metres, 200 metres,
Medal record
Women's athletics
Representing Dominica
CARIFTA Games (Youth)
Gold medal – first place	2012 Hamilton	200 m

Luan Gabriel (born 3 May 1996, in Roseau) is a Dominican sprinter. At the 2012 Summer Olympics, she competed in the Women's 200 metres event, but was eliminated in the first round.
