= Domonique Williams =

Trinidad and Tobago sprinter

Personal information
- Nationality: Trinidad and Tobago
- Born: 8 August 1994 (age 31)

Sport
- Sport: Sprinting
- Event: 400 metres

Domonique Williams (born 8 August 1994) is a Trinidad and Tobago sprinter. She competed in the women's 400 metres at the 2017 World Championships in Athletics.

Williams was an All-American sprinter for the Alabama Crimson Tide track and field team, finishing 4th in the 4 × 400 metres relay at the 2017 NCAA Division I Indoor Track and Field Championships.
