= Ashley Riley =

Bahamian sprinter

Personal information
- Born: April 27, 1995 (age 31)
Medal record
Athletics
Representing Bahamas
World Indoor Championships
Silver medal – second place	2016 Portland	4 × 400 m relay
NACAC U23 Championships
Bronze medal – third place	2016 San Salvador	4×400 m relay
CAC Junior Championships (Youth)
Gold medal – first place	2010 Santo Domingo	4×400 m relay
CARIFTA Games Junior (U20)
Bronze medal – third place	2014 Fort-de-France	4×400 m relay
CARIFTA Games Junior (U17)
Bronze medal – third place	2010 George Town	800m

Ashley Riley (born April 27, 1995) is a male sprinter from Nassau, Bahamas, who mainly competes in the 400m. He attended CR Walker High School in Nassau, Bahamas, before going on to compete for Colby Community College and Southeastern Louisiana University.

Riley won a silver medal at the 2016 IAAF World Indoor Championships in Portland, Oregon, by running the third leg in the first heat on the 4 x 400 Relay. He also competed in the 4 x 400 Relay at the 2016 NACAC U23 Championships in Athletics in San Salvador, El Salvador.

== Personal bests ==
Event	Time (seconds)	Venue	Date
200m	21.84 (+0.4)	Hammond, Louisiana	16 APR 2016
400m	46.70	Lafayette, Louisiana	18 MAR 2017
800m	1:52.36	Houston, Texas	22 MAR 2014
