= 2014 World Junior Championships in Athletics – Women's 4 × 100 metres relay =

The women's 4 x 100 metres relay event at the 2014 World Junior Championships in Athletics was held in Eugene, Oregon, USA, at Hayward Field on 25 and 26 July 2014.

== Medalists ==
Gold	Teahna Daniels; Ariana Washington; Jada Martin; Kaylin Whitney; United States
Silver	Sashalee Forbes; Kedisha Dallas; Saqukine Cameron; Natalliah Whyte; Jamaica
Bronze	Lisa Marie Kwayie; Lisa Mayer; Gina Lückenkemper; Chantal Butzek; Germany

== Records ==
Standing records prior to the 2014 World Junior Championships in Athletics
World Junior Record	United States (Bianca Knight, Jeneba Tarmoh, Elizabeth Olear, Gabrielle Mayo)	43.29	Eugene, United States	8 August 2006
Championship Record	Jamaica (Sherone Simpson, Kerron Stewart, Anneisha McLaughlin, Simone Facey)	43.40	Kingston, Jamaica	21 July 2002
World Junior Leading	Jamaica	44.16	Fort-de-France, Martinique	20 April 2014
Broken records during the 2014 World Junior Championships in Athletics

== Results ==
=== Final ===
26 July
Start time: 17:18 Temperature: 31 °C Humidity: 26 %

Rank	Name	Nationality	Lane	Reaction Time	Time	Notes
1st place, gold medalist(s)	United States	Teahna Daniels; Ariana Washington; Jada Martin; Kaylin Whitney	3	0.171	43.46	WJL
2nd place, silver medalist(s)	Jamaica	Sashalee Forbes; Kedisha Dallas; Saqukine Cameron; Natalliah Whyte	5	0.199	43.97	SB
3rd place, bronze medalist(s)	Germany	Lisa Marie Kwayie; Lisa Mayer; Gina Lückenkemper; Chantal Butzek	2	0.177	44.65	SB
4	Trinidad and Tobago	Aaliyah Telesford; Zakiya Denoon; Mauricia Prieto; Kayelle Clarke	4	0.168	44.75	
5	Switzerland	Majella Hauri; Ajla del Ponte; Sarah Atcho; Irina Strebel	8	0.175	45.02	SB
6	Japan	Sayaka Adachi; Anna Doi; Tomoka Tsuchihashi; Maho Takamori	7	0.209	45.40	
	Brazil	Letícia de Souza; Vitoria Cristina Rosa; Mirna da Silva; Tamiris de Liz	6	0.152	DNF	
	Bahamas	Devynne Charlton; Carmiesha Cox; Brianne Bethel; Keianna Albury	1	0.149	DQ	170.7

Note:
IAAF Rule 170.7 – Passing the baton outside the takeover zone

=== Heats ===
25 July
First 2 in each heat (Q) and the next 2 fastest (q) advance to the Final

==== Summary ====
Rank	Nation	Time	Notes
1	United States	44.03	Q WJL
2	Jamaica	44.22	Q
3	Brazil	44.61	Q SB
4	Trinidad and Tobago	44.68	Q
5	Germany	44.87	q
6	Switzerland	45.17	Q SB
7	Bahamas	45.22	q SB
8	Netherlands	45.29	
9	Japan	45.38	Q SB
10	Australia	45.54	
11	Nigeria	45.93	
12	South Africa	46.25	SB
	Canada	DNF	
	France	DNF	
	United Kingdom	DNF	
	Poland	DNF	
	Cyprus	DQ	170.7
	Barbados	DNS	

==== Details ====
First 2 in each heat (Q) and the next 2 fastest (q) advance to the Final

===== Heat 1 =====
26 July
Start time: 18:02 Temperature: 28 °C Humidity: 33%

Rank	Nation	Competitors	Lane	Reaction Time	Time	Notes
1	United States	Teahna Daniels; Ariana Washington; Jada Martin; Ky Westbrook	6	0.172	44.03	Q WJL
2	Brazil	Letícia de Souza; Vitoria Cristina Rosa; Mirna da Silva; Tamiris de Liz	3	0.149	44.61	Q SB
3	Germany	Lisa Marie Kwayie; Lisa Mayer; Gina Lückenkemper; Chantal Butzek	5	0.180	44.87	q
4	Bahamas	Carmiesha Cox; Jenae Ambrose; Brianne Bethel; Keianna Albury	2	0.202	45.22	q SB
5	South Africa	Carla Johnson; Simoné Du Plooy; Robyn Haupt; Tebogo Mamathu	7	0.301	46.25	SB
	France	Solenn Compper; Eva Berger; Maroussia Paré; Floriane Gnafoua	4	0.198	DNF	

===== Heat 2 =====
26 July
Start time: 18:09 Temperature: 28 °C Humidity: 33%

Rank	Nation	Competitors	Lane	Reaction Time	Time	Notes
1	Jamaica	Shimayra Williams; Chanice Bonner; Sashalee Forbes; Saqukine Cameron	4	0.182	44.22	Q
2	Switzerland	Majella Hauri; Ajla del Ponte; Sarah Atcho; Irina Strebel	2	0.177	45.17	Q SB
3	Netherlands	Lieke Klaver; Tasa Jiya; Eva Hovenkamp; Marije van Hunenstijn	5	0.169	45.29	
4	Nigeria	Abolaji Omotayo; Ese Brume; Haisha Kikelomo Bisiolu; Deborah Oluwaseun Odeyemi	6	0.197	45.93	
	Canada	Leya Buchanan; Sade McCreath; Natasha Brown; Raquel Tjernagel	7	0.159	DNF	
	Barbados		3		DNS	

===== Heat 3 =====
26 July
Start time: 18:17 Temperature: 28 °C Humidity: 33%

Rank	Nation	Competitors	Lane	Reaction Time	Time	Notes
1	Trinidad and Tobago	Aaliyah Telesford; Zakiya Denoon; Mauricia Prieto; Kayelle Clarke	6	0.183	44.68	Q
2	Japan	Sayaka Adachi; Anna Doi; Tomoka Tsuchihashi; Maho Takamori	3	0.143	45.38	Q SB
3	Australia	Hana Basic; Audrey Kyriacou; Tavleen Singh; Larissa Chambers	5	0.181	45.54	
	United Kingdom	Ama Pipi; Cheriece Hylton; Iman Lansiquot; Desiree Henry	2	0.205	DNF	
	Poland	Weronika Błażek; Klaudia Gołąbek; Kamila Janowska; Ewa Swoboda	7	0.169	DNF	
	Cyprus	Marianna Pisiara; Olivia Fotopoulou; Dimitra Kyriakidou; Paraskevi Andreou	4	0.165	DQ	170.7

Note:
IAAF Rule 170.7 – Passing the baton outside the takeover zone

== Participation ==
According to an unofficial count, 72 athletes from 17 countries participated in the event.

- Australia (4)
- Bahamas (5)
- Brazil (4)
- Canada (4)
- Cyprus (4)
- France (4)
- Germany (4)
- Jamaica (6)
- Japan (4)
- Netherlands (4)
- Nigeria (4)
- Poland (4)
- South Africa (4)
- Switzerland (4)
- Trinidad and Tobago (4)
- United Kingdom (4)
- United States (5)
