= 2014 Central American and Caribbean Junior Championships in Athletics =

XX Central American and Caribbean Junior Championships
- Dates: 4–6 July 2014
- Host city: Morelia, Michoacán, Mexico
- Venue: Complejo Deportivo Bicentenario
- Level: Junior and Youth
- Events: 85
- Participation: 431 athletes from 24 nations

The 2014 Central American and Caribbean Junior Championships were held at the Complejo Deportivo Bicentenario in Morelia, Michoacán, Mexico, between 4–6 July 2014.

In the junior category, a total of 43 events were contested, 21 by boys and 22 by girls, whereas in the youth category, a total of 42 events were contested, 21 by boys and 21 by girls.

== Medal summary ==
Complete results can be found on the Central American and Caribbean Athletic Confederation webpage.

=== Boys U-20 (Junior) ===
| Event | Gold | | Silver | | Bronze | |
|---|---|---|---|---|---|---|
| 100 metres (wind: -0.1 m/s) | Johnathan Farinha; Trinidad and Tobago | 10.38 | Edward Clarke; Jamaica | 10.48 | Kyle Webb; Bermuda | 10.55 |
| 200 metres (wind: +0.8 m/s) | Zharnel Hughes; Anguilla | 20.33 CR | Johnathan Farinha; Trinidad and Tobago | 20.82 | Miguel Francis; Antigua and Barbuda | 21.00 |
| 400 metres | Machel Cedenio; Trinidad and Tobago | 45.28 | Twayne Crooks; Jamaica | 46.50 | Warren Hazel; Saint Kitts and Nevis | 46.72 |
| 800 metres | Andrés Arroyo; Puerto Rico | 1:49.75 | José Ricardo Jiménez; Mexico | 1:50.46 | Kevon Robinson; Jamaica | 1:50.82 |
| 1500 metres | José María Martínez; Mexico | 3:57.52 | Julio Ortiz; Mexico | 3:59.21 | Andrés Arroyo; Puerto Rico | 4:04.38 |
| 5000 metres | José María Martínez; Mexico | 15:36.58 | Mario Lugo; Mexico | 15:42.72 | Joshua Correa; Puerto Rico | 16:12.05 |
| 3000 metres steeplechase (0.91 m) | Francisco Reyes; Mexico | 9:40.12 | Daniel Morales; Mexico | 9:53.97 | José Enrique Calvo; Costa Rica | 9:59.93 |
| 110 metres hurdles (0.99 m) (wind: +1.0 m/s) | Marvin Williams; Jamaica | 13.52 | Ruebin Walters; Trinidad and Tobago | 13.59 | Ricardo Torres; Puerto Rico | 13.76 |
| 400 metres hurdles (0.91 m) | Marvin Williams; Jamaica | 52.55 | Derick Díaz; Puerto Rico | 52.73 | Jerrad Mason; Barbados | 53.26 |
| High jump | Arturo Abascal; Mexico | 2.15m | Clayton Brown; Jamaica | 2.10m | Ricardo Valdez; Mexico | 1.95m |
| Pole vault | Raúl Ríos; Mexico | 4.90m | Jorge Luna; Mexico | 4.90m | | |
| Long jump | Laquan Nairn; Bahamas | 7.55m (wind: +1.8 m/s) | Ricardo Morales; Mexico | 7.53m (wind: +1.2 m/s) | Shamar Rock; Barbados | 7.47m (wind: +0.6 m/s) |
| Triple jump | Odaine Lewis; Jamaica | 15.46m (wind: +0.6 m/s) | Antonio Hernández; Mexico | 15.19m (wind: +0.4 m/s) | Ricardo Morales; Mexico | 14.56m (wind: +1.2 m/s) |
| Shot put (6 kg) | Mario Alberto Lozano; Mexico | 18.23m | Uzziel Muñoz; Mexico | 17.35m | Alec-Verne Longmore; Jamaica | 16.40m |
| Discus throw (1.75 kg) | Khyle Higgs; Bahamas | 54.64m | Uzziel Muñoz; Mexico | 51.87m | Alberto Esqu Vargas; Mexico | 49.42m |
| Hammer throw (6 kg) | Jerome Vega; Puerto Rico | 67.04m | Pedro Macías; Mexico | 64.81m | Guillermo Guzmán Jr. Mexico | 61.40m |
| Javelin throw (800g) | Shaquille Waithe; Trinidad and Tobago | 70.39m | Denzel Pratt; Bahamas | 66.18m | Orlando Thomas; Jamaica | 63.89m |
| Decathlon | Felipe de Jesús Ruíz; Mexico | 6440 pts | Francisco Olguín; Mexico | 6244 pts | Ronald Edyberto Ramírez; Guatemala | 6072 pts |
| 10,000 m track walk | Ricardo Ortiz; Mexico | 42:24.10 | José Luis Doctor; Mexico | 43:10.71 | Jürgen Grave; Guatemala | 44:06.44 |
| 4 × 100 metres relay | Trinidad and Tobago; John-Mark Constantine; Johnathan Farinha; Holland Cabara; Aaron Lewis | 40.06 | Jamaica; Clayton Brown; Twayne Crooks; Edward Clarke; Raheem Robinson | 40.66 | Mexico; Emiliano Cavazos; Iván Moreno; Gessael López; Roberto Luevano | 40.81 |
| 4 × 400 metres relay | Jamaica; Ivan Henry; Twayne Crooks; Marvin Williams; Rajay Hamilton | 3:11.20 | Puerto Rico; Derick Díaz; Ricardo Torres; Andrés Arroyo; Ricardo Feliciano | 3:12.10 | Trinidad and Tobago; Ohdel James; Johnathan Farinha; Asa Guevara; Breon Mullins | 3:13.73 |

=== Girls U-20 (Junior) ===
| Event | Gold | | Silver | | Bronze | |
|---|---|---|---|---|---|---|
| 100 metres (wind: +0.7 m/s) | Alaliyah Telesford; Trinidad and Tobago | 11.47 | Zakiya Denoon; Trinidad and Tobago | 11.55 | Keianna Albury; Bahamas | 11.56 |
| 200 metres (wind: +1.3 m/s) | Keianna Albury; Bahamas | 23.54 | Zakiya Denoon; Trinidad and Tobago | 23.63 | Kayelle Clarke; Trinidad and Tobago | 23.71 |
| 400 metres | Monique McPherson; Jamaica | 55.64 | Paola Vázquez; Mexico | 56.06 | Mariana Pérez; Dominican Republic | 58.17 |
| 800 metres | Monique McPherson; Jamaica | 2:17.11 | Lizette Sala; Mexico | 2:21.59 | Hannia Palafox; Mexico | 2:22.71 |
| 1500 metres | Arantza Hernández; Mexico | 4:56.02 | Yaraby Banda; Mexico | 5:00.00 | Wendy Ascencio; El Salvador | 5:22.11 |
| 3000 metres | Ivett Licona; Mexico | 10:47.21 | Paola Fernanda Espinosa; Mexico | 11:16.72 | Wendy Ascencio; El Salvador | 12:07.25 |
| 5000 metres | Karina Hernández; Mexico | 19:05.97 | Ivett Licona; Mexico | 19:08.46 | Wendy Ascencio; El Salvador | 20:13.87 |
| 3000 metres steeplechase (0.76 m) | Nataly Mendoza; Mexico | 11:50.57 | Rosa Lancho; Mexico | 12:05.73 | | |
| 100 metres hurdles (0.84 m) (wind: +1.4 m/s) | Devynne Charlton; Bahamas | 13.56 | Andrea Vargas; Costa Rica | 13.72 | Akila McShine; Trinidad and Tobago | 14.05 |
| 400 metres hurdles (0.76 m) | Tia-Adana Belle; Barbados | 1:00.30 | Paloma Morales; Mexico | 1:01.49 | Talia Thompson; Bahamas | 1:01.57 |
| High jump | Krista-Gay Taylor; Jamaica | 1.79m | Safia Morgan; Jamaica; Luisa Rejón; Mexico | 1.60m | | |
| Pole vault | Jazmín Hernández; Mexico | 3.40m | Yaritza Díaz; Puerto Rico | 3.30m | | |
| Long jump | Akela Jones; Barbados | 6.41m w (wind: +3.7 m/s) | Annastacia Forrester; Jamaica | 5.90m w (wind: +3.0 m/s) | Nathalee Aranda; Panama | 5.82m (wind: +2.0 m/s) |
| Triple jump | Dannielle Gibson; Bahamas | 11.94m (wind: +0.2 m/s) | Lidia Rodríguez; Mexico | 11.40m (wind: +0.5 m/s) | Luisa Rejón; Mexico | 11.05m (wind: +0.1 m/s) |
| Shot put (4 kg) | Portious Warren; Trinidad and Tobago | 14.47m | Jess St.John; Antigua and Barbuda | 13.29m | Ana Karen Guerrero; Mexico | 13.07m |
| Discus throw (1 kg) | Shadae Lawrence; Jamaica | 46.25m | Silvia Luviano; Mexico | 42.88m | Karen Madero; Mexico | 40.01m |
| Hammer throw (4 kg) | Mariana Hernández; Mexico | 50.72m | Zaira Zavala; Mexico | 49.25m | Yulisa de la Rosa; Dominican Republic | 19.47m |
| Javelin throw (600g) | Danna Corral; Mexico | 42.78m | Isheka Binns; Jamaica | 42.21m | Yulisa de la Rosa; Dominican Republic | 39.68m |
| Heptathlon | Nahomi Urbano; Mexico | 4846 pts | Evelyn Martínez; Mexico | 4317 pts | Keyth Agosto; Puerto Rico | 4174 pts |
| 5000 m track walk | Sonia Barrondo; Guatemala | 24:37.81 | María Guadalupe Sánchez; Mexico | 24:58.40 | Lluvia González; Mexico | 26:20.93 |
| 4 × 100 metres relay | Trinidad and Tobago; Zakiya Denoon; Alaliyah Telesford; Kayelle Clarke; Akila McShine | 44.24 CR | Jamaica; Sashalee Forbes; Yanique Thompson; Saqukine Cameron; Shimayra Williams | 44.33 | Bahamas; Devynne Charlton; Talia Thompson; Dannielle Gibson; Keianna Albury | 45.73 |
| 4 × 400 metres relay | Mexico; Diana Ruíz; Paloma Morales; Yoayan Salazar; Paola Vázquez | 3:45.49 | Jamaica; Monique McPherson; Shimayra Williams; Annastacia Forrester; Saqukine Cameron | 3:47.25 | Dominican Republic; Alexandra de la Cruz; Anabel Medina; Estrella de Aza; Mariana Pérez | 3:54.26 |

=== Boys U-18 (Youth) ===
| Event | Gold | | Silver | | Bronze | |
|---|---|---|---|---|---|---|
| 100 metres (wind: +0.4 m/s) | Waseem Williams; Jamaica | 10.47 | Keannu Pennerman; Bahamas | 10.51 | Akanni Hislop; Trinidad and Tobago | 10.63 |
| 200 metres (wind: +1.4 m/s) | Chad Walker; Jamaica | 21.12 | Fabian Hewitt; Jamaica | 21.14 | Akanni Hislop; Trinidad and Tobago | 21.27 |
| 400 metres | Jamal Walton; Cayman Islands | 47.01 CR | Henri Delauze; Bahamas | 47.21 | Jason Yaw; Guyana | 47.71 |
| 800 metres | Jesús López; Mexico | 1:52.38 CR | Rayon Butler; Jamaica | 1:55.52 | David Cortés; Mexico | 1:55.66 |
| 1500 metres | José Armando Valencia; Mexico | 4:08.45 | Edgar Ramírez; Mexico | 4:11.07 | Shevan Parks; Jamaica | 4:12.12 |
| 3000 metres | José Luis Durán; Mexico | 8:58.39 | Cristopher Escamilla; Mexico | 9:00.35 | César Peraza; El Salvador | 9:16.71 |
| 2000 metres steeplechase (0.91 m) | José Armando Valencia; Mexico | 6:13.69 | José Martín Rodríguez; Mexico | 6:21.51 | Rodrigo Garnica; Guatemala | 6:23.46 |
| 110 metres hurdles (0.91 m) (wind: +0.5 m/s) | Roje Jackson-Chin; Jamaica | 13.36 CR | Michael Nicholls; Barbados | 13.66 | Tavonte Mott; Bahamas | 13.82 |
| 400 metres hurdles (0.84 m) | Rivaldo Leacock; Barbados | 51.81 | Orlando Smith; Jamaica | 53.75 | Ricardo Escobar; Mexico | 54.01 |
| High jump | Ken Mullings; Bahamas | 2.05m | David Ariel Juárez; Mexico | 2.02m | Jah-Nhai Perinchief; Bermuda | 2.02m |
| Pole vault | Efrén Ramírez; Mexico | 4.60m | Nathan Riveraz; El Salvador | 4.50m | Fernando Martínez; Mexico | 4.25m |
| Long jump | Andwuelle Wright; Trinidad and Tobago | 7.15m (wind: +1.5 m/s) | Bryan Sánchez; Mexico | 6.93m (wind: +1.7 m/s) | Tony Solís; Dominican Republic | 6.91m (wind: +1.1 m/s) |
| Triple jump | Miguel van Assen; Suriname | 16.01m (wind: +0.6 m/s) CR | Dave Pika; Suriname | 15.26m (wind: +1.0 m/s) | Tony Solís; Dominican Republic | 14.74m (wind: +1.0 m/s) |
| Shot put (5 kg) | Alejandro Castillo; Mexico | 18.62m | Jairo Morán; Mexico | 18.30m | Sanjae Lawrence; Jamaica | 17.78m |
| Discus throw (1.5 kg) | José Higuera; Mexico | 53.24m CR | Edilberto González; Puerto Rico | 51.02m | Vikarie Elliott; Jamaica | 49.45m |
| Hammer throw (5 kg) | Luis de Jesús; Puerto Rico | 59.86m | Pablo David Acosta; Mexico | 56.96m | Yair Álvarez; Mexico | 56.89m |
| Javelin throw (700g) | Anderson Peters; Grenada | 72.39m CR | José Munguía; Mexico | 68.95m | Mickel Joseph; Grenada | 66.06m |
| Decathlon | Jafett Juárez; Mexico | 5945 pts CR | José Hernández; Puerto Rico | 5912 pts | Ian West; Trinidad and Tobago | 5888 pts |
| 10,000 m track walk | Noel Chama; Mexico | 42:45.24 CR | Enrique Martínez; Mexico | 43:40.40 | Jorge Cruz; Puerto Rico | 49:44.73 |
| 4 × 100 metres relay | Trinidad and Tobago; David Winchester; Akanni Hislop; Corey Stewart; Xavier Mulugata | 41.25 | Bahamas; Keannu Pennerman; Tavonte Mott; Samson Colebrooke; Aaron Ross | 41.76 | Puerto Rico; Dangel Cotto; Ezequiel Suarez; Steven Núñez; Adier Colón | 42.15 |
| 4 × 400 metres relay | Trinidad and Tobago; Kobe John; Terry Frederick; Jacob Clair; Kashief King | 3:13.93 | Bahamas; Kinard Rolle; Keanu Pennerman; Henri Delauze; Samson Colebrooke | 3:14.70 | Jamaica; Terry Thomas; Jauvney James; Orlando Smith; Aykeeme Francis | 3:16.27 |

=== Girls U-18 (Youth) ===
| Event | Gold | | Silver | | Bronze | |
|---|---|---|---|---|---|---|
| 100 metres (wind: +1.1 m/s) | Kimone Shaw; Jamaica | 11.51 CR | Evelyn Tristan; Barbados | 11.52 | Cecilia Tamayo; Mexico | 11.65 |
| 200 metres (wind: +1.6 m/s) | Brianne Bethel; Bahamas | 24.10 | Jenae Ambrose; Bahamas | 24.18 | Shanice Reid; Jamaica | 24.24 |
| 400 metres | Faheemah Scraders; Bermuda | 55.55 | Seagale Brown; Jamaica | 56.13 | Jevina Sampson; Guyana | 57.15 |
| 800 metres | Faheemah Scraders; Bermuda | 2:14.00 | Junelle Bromfield; Jamaica | 2:14.40 | Alma Delia Cortés; Mexico | 2:16.01 |
| 1500 metres | Alma Delia Cortés; Mexico | 4:43.55 CR | Ana Mirta Hércules; El Salvador | 4:45.92 | Mayra Salas; Mexico | 4:55.55 |
| 3000 metres | Alondra Negrón; Puerto Rico | 10:20.14 CR | Ariadna Rivera; Mexico | 10:30.18 | Ana Mirta Hércules; El Salvador | 10:30.86 |
| 2000 metres steeplechase (0.76 m) | Alondra Negrón; Puerto Rico | 7:10.52 CR | Ariadna Rivera; Mexico | 7:24.61 | Vanessa Romano; Mexico | 7:41.50 |
| 100 metres hurdles (0.76 m) (wind: +1.5 m/s) | Jeanine Williams; Jamaica | 13.46 CR | Jeminise Parris; Trinidad and Tobago | 13.70 | Janeek Brown; Jamaica | 13.92 |
| 400 metres hurdles (0.76 m) | Paola Morán; Mexico | 1:02.18 | Shanice Cohen; Jamaica | 1:02.23 | Keysha Liz Dumeng; Puerto Rico | 1:02.83 |
| High jump | Diana Guadalupe González; Mexico | 1.81m =CR | Ximena Esquivel; Mexico | 1.78m | Shian Salmon; Jamaica | 1.72m |
| Pole vault | Vania Sofía Staufert; Mexico | 3.20m CR | Andrea Velasco; El Salvador | 3.20m CR | Fátima Soto; El Salvador | 3.05m |
| Long jump | Rechelle Meade; Anguilla | 5.92m w (wind: +2.1 m/s) | Shanique Wright; Jamaica | 5.79m w (wind: +2.5 m/s) | Andira Ferguson; Bahamas | 5.72m w (wind: +2.4 m/s) |
| Triple jump | Shanique Wright; Jamaica | 12.39m (wind: +0.6 m/s) CR | Claudia María Salgado; Mexico | 11.70m (wind: -0.8 m/s) | Flor Romero; Mexico | 11.42m (wind: -0.4 m/s) |
| Shot put (3 kg) | María Fernanda Orozco; Mexico | 17.64m CR | Naomi Mojica; Mexico | 16.72m | Chelsea James; Trinidad and Tobago | 16.00m |
| Discus throw (1 kg) | María Fernanda Orozco; Mexico | 46.87m | Shanice Love; Jamaica | 46.83m | Janeell Fullerton; Jamaica | 46.40m |
| Hammer throw (3 kg) | María Victoria Villa; Mexico | 60.85m CR | Lorena Rodríguez; Mexico | 56.79m | Freshlian Luna; Puerto Rico | 53.95m |
| Javelin throw (500g) | Luz Mariana Castro; Mexico | 52.05m CR | Karla Gallardo; Mexico | 45.45m | Hayley Matthews; Barbados | 44.88m |
| Heptathlon | Jomary Carmona; Puerto Rico | 4533 pts | Lilian Borja; Mexico | 4508 pts | Jaquelynne Rodríguez; Mexico | 4261 pts |
| 5000 m track walk | Vivian Castillo; Mexico | 24:32.47 CR | Iliana García; Mexico | 24:46.94 | Rachelle de Orbetta; Puerto Rico | 25:02.28 |
| 4 × 100 metres relay | Jamaica; Jeanine Williams; Vanesha Pusey; Shanice Reid; Kimone Shaw | 44.97 CR | Bahamas; Andira Ferguson; Jenae Ambrose; Charisma Taylor; Brianne Bethel | 46.76 | Mexico; Adriana Ávila; Paola Itzel Ascencio; Akary Juárez; Cecilia Tamayo | 47.32 |
| 4 × 400 metres relay | Mexico; Patrícia Mendoza; Liliana Guadalupe Nájera; Melissa Paredes; Alejandra Rubio | 3:50.63 | Bahamas; Brianne Bethel; Amber Ford; Jenae Ambrose; Charisma Taylor | 3:56.06 | | |

== Medal table ==
An unofficial medal count is in agreement with published official numbers.

* Host nation (Mexico)

| Rank | Nation | Gold | Silver | Bronze | Total |
|---|---|---|---|---|---|
| 1 | Mexico (MEX)* | 36 | 43 | 21 | 100 |
| 2 | Jamaica (JAM) | 15 | 17 | 11 | 43 |
| 3 | Trinidad and Tobago (TTO) | 10 | 5 | 7 | 22 |
| 4 | Bahamas (BAH) | 7 | 8 | 5 | 20 |
| 5 | Puerto Rico (PUR) | 6 | 5 | 9 | 20 |
| 6 | Barbados (BAR) | 3 | 2 | 3 | 8 |
| 7 | Bermuda (BER) | 2 | 0 | 2 | 4 |
| 8 | Commonwealth Games Federation (CGF) | 2 | 0 | 0 | 2 |
| 9 | Suriname (SUR) | 1 | 1 | 0 | 2 |
| 10 | Guatemala (GUA) | 1 | 0 | 3 | 4 |
| 11 | Grenada (GRN) | 1 | 0 | 1 | 2 |
| 12 | Cayman Islands (CAY) | 1 | 0 | 0 | 1 |
| 13 | El Salvador (ESA) | 0 | 3 | 6 | 9 |
| 14 | Antigua and Barbuda (ATG) | 0 | 1 | 1 | 2 |
| 14 | Costa Rica (CRC) | 0 | 1 | 1 | 2 |
| 16 | Dominican Republic (DOM) | 0 | 0 | 6 | 6 |
| 17 | Guyana (GUY) | 0 | 0 | 2 | 2 |
| 18 | Panama (PAN) | 0 | 0 | 1 | 1 |
| 18 | Saint Kitts and Nevis (SKN) | 0 | 0 | 1 | 1 |
| Totals (19 entries) | | 85 | 86 | 80 | 251 |

== Participation ==
According to an unofficial count, 431 athletes from 24 countries participated.

- Anguilla (2)
- Antigua and Barbuda (2)
- Aruba (1)
- Bahamas (31)
- Barbados (12)
- Belize (2)
- Bermuda (12)
- Cayman Islands (6)
- Costa Rica (10)
- Curaçao (3)
- Dominican Republic (21)
- El Salvador (12)
- Grenada (4)
- Guatemala (11)
- Guyana (3)
- Jamaica (54)
- Mexico (147)
- Panama (9)
- Puerto Rico (35)
- Saint Kitts and Nevis (2)
- Saint Vincent and the Grenadines (4)
- Suriname (2)
- Turks and Caicos Islands (1)
- Trinidad and Tobago (45)
