= 2014 CARIFTA Games =

XLIII CARIFTA Games
- Dates: 19–21 April
- Host city: Fort-de-France, Martinique /
- Venue: Stade Pierre Aliker
- Level: Junior and Youth
- Events: 66
- Participation: 25 nations
- Records set: 20 championship records

The 2014 CARIFTA Games were held from April 19–21, 2014 at the Stade Pierre Aliker in Fort-de-France, Martinique. A detailed report of the event was given for the IAAF.

For the first time, the youth competition was open for athletes aged under-18 rather than under-17. The event served as regional trials for the athletics competitions at the 2014 Summer Youth Olympics.

== Austin Sealy Award ==
The Austin Sealy Trophy for the most outstanding athlete of the games was awarded to Akela Jones, Barbados. She won three gold medals (100 m hurdles, high jump, and long jump) in the junior (U-20) category.

== Records ==
By default, all winning marks in the U-18 category were new championship records, because the category was newly introduced substituting the U-17 category. However, only the marks that improved the existent U-17 records are considered here.

| Event | Record | Athlete | Country | Type |
Boys under-20 (Junior)
| 110 metres hurdles (99 cm) | 13.23 s (wind: +1.6 m/s) | Wilhem Belocian | /Guadeloupe | CR |
| Octathlon | 5696 pts | Kevin Roberts | Trinidad and Tobago | CR |
| 4 × 100 metres relay | 39.38 s | Raheem Robinson; Michael O'Hara; Jordon Chin; Jevaughn Minzie | Jamaica | CR |
Girls under-20 (Junior)
| Heptathlon | 4648 pts | Chelsey Linton | Dominica | CR |
Boys under-18 (Youth)
| 100 metres | 10.27 s wind: +1.9 m/s | Raheem Chambers | Jamaica | CR |
| 110 metres (91 cm) | 13.32 s wind: +1.3 m/s (heat) | Jaheel Hyde | Jamaica | CR |
| 400 metres (84 cm) | 51.21 s | Jaheel Hyde | Jamaica | CR |
| Triple jump | 16.33 m (wind: +2.0 m/s) | Miguel van Assen | Suriname | CR |
| Discus throw (1.5 kg) | 54.41 m | Vashon McCarty | Jamaica | CR |
| Javelin throw (700g) | 67.67 m | Anderson Peters | Grenada | CR |
| 4 × 100 metres relay | 40.76 | Kinard Rolle; Tyler Bowe; Keanu Pennerman; Javan Martin | Bahamas | =CR |
| 4 × 400 metres relay | 3:12.63 | Nathaniel Bann; Martin Manley; Nigel Ellis; Jaheel Hyde | Jamaica | CR |
Girls under-18 (Youth)
| 100 metres hurdles (76 cm) | 13.48 (wind: +1.4 m/s) | Janeek Brown | Jamaica | CR |
| 400 metres hurdles (76 cm) | 59.72 s | Shenice Cohen | Jamaica | CR |
| Long jump | 6.24 m (wind: NWI) | Yanis Esméralda David | /Guadeloupe | CR |
| Triple jump | 13.10 m (wind: +1.5 m/s) | Yanis Esméralda David | /Guadeloupe | CR |
| Shot put (3.0 kg) | 16.12 m | Chelsea James | Trinidad and Tobago | CR |
| Discus throw (1.0 kg) | 46.47 m | Janel Fullerton | Jamaica | CR |
| Javelin throw (500g) | 49.66 m | Shanee Angol | Dominica | CR |
| 4 × 100 metres relay | 44.80 | Shellece Clarke; Shanice Reid; Natalliah White; Kimone Shaw | Jamaica | CR |
| 4 × 400 metres relay | 3:37.65 | Taqece Duggan; Junell Bromfield; Shannon Kalawan; Tiffany James | Jamaica | CR |

Key

AR — Area record • CR — Championship record • NR — National record

== Medal summary ==
Medal winners were published.

=== Boys U-20 (Junior) ===
| Event | Gold | | Silver | | Bronze | |
|---|---|---|---|---|---|---|
| 100 metres (wind: +1.7 m/s) | Jevaughn Minzie; Jamaica | 10.18 | Levi Cadogan; Barbados | 10.25 | Jonathan Farinha; Trinidad and Tobago | 10.27 |
| 200 metres (wind: +1.3 m/s) | Michael O'Hara; Jamaica | 20.50 | Jevaughn Minzie; Jamaica | 20.56 | Levi Cadogan; Barbados | 20.67 |
| 400 metres | Machel Cedenio; Trinidad and Tobago | 45.95 | Nathon Allen; Jamaica | 46.97 | Asa Guevara; Trinidad and Tobago | 47.35 |
| 800 metres | Kevon Robinson; Jamaica | 1:51.02 | Rajay Hamilton; Jamaica | 1:51.05 | Nicholas Landeau; Trinidad and Tobago | 1:51.86 |
| 1500 metres | Chadoye Dawson; Jamaica | 3:56.93 | Nicholas Landeau; Trinidad and Tobago | 3:58.27 | Dage Minors; Bermuda | 3:58.39 |
| 5000 metres | Obrien Frith; Jamaica | 15:48.51 | Romario Foote; Jamaica | 15:51.66 | Brian Ludop /Martinique | 16:04.56 |
| 110 metres hurdles (99 cm) (wind: +1.6 m/s) | Wilhem Belocian /Guadeloupe | 13.23 CR | Tyler Mason; Jamaica | 13.25 | Ruebin Walters; Trinidad and Tobago | 13.57 |
| 400 metres hurdles (91 cm) | Okeen Williams; Jamaica | 50.99 | Marvin Williams; Jamaica | 51.22 | Ruebin Walters; Trinidad and Tobago | 51.68 |
| High jump | Clayton Brown; Jamaica | 2.16 m | Christoff Bryan; Jamaica | 2.16 m | Laquan Nairn; Bahamas; Tahir Jefferson; Saint Kitts and Nevis | 2.00 m |
| Pole vault ^{†} | Mickey Ferdinand; Saint Lucia | 3.80 m | Jessy Voitier /Martinique | 3.50 m | Guillaume Erichaud /Martinique | 2.80 m |
| Long jump | Shamar Rock; Barbados | 7.56 m (wind: +1.7 m/s) | Kevin Philbert; Curaçao | 7.36 m (wind: +1.4 m/s) | Jevaughn Fowler; Jamaica | 7.19 m w (wind: +2.7 m/s) |
| Triple jump | Odaine Lewis; Jamaica | 15.49 m (wind: +0.9 m/s) | Shamar Rock; Barbados | 15.39 m (wind: +1.6 m/s) | Kadeem O'Sullivan; Jamaica | 15.30 m (wind: +0.1 m/s) |
| Shot put (6.0 kg) | Demar Gayle; Jamaica | 16.72 m | Kenejah Williams; Trinidad and Tobago | 16.55 m | Romario Antoine; Barbados | 16.42 m |
| Discus throw (1.7 kg) | Glefford Watson; Jamaica | 52.00 m | Demar Gayle; Jamaica | 51.96 m | Drexel Maycock; Bahamas | 49.31 m |
| Javelin throw (800g) | Shakille Waithe; Trinidad and Tobago | 67.53 m | Denzel Pratt; Bahamas | 64.55 m | Adrian Williams; Saint Kitts and Nevis | 64.49 m |
| Octathlon ^{†} | Kevin Roberts; Trinidad and Tobago | 5696 pts CR | Javel St.Paul; Grenada | 5258 pts | Florian Simax /Martinique | 5222 pts |
| 4 × 100 metres relay | Jamaica; Raheem Robinson; Michael O'Hara; Jordon Chin; Jevaughn Minzie | 39.38 CR | Bahamas; Cliff Resais; Ian Kerr; Deedro Clarke; Steven Gardiner | 40.35 | Trinidad and Tobago; Micah Ballantyne; John Constantine; Jamaal Bridges; Jonathan Farinha | 40.71 |
| 4 × 400 metres relay | Trinidad and Tobago; Asa Guevara; Jonathan Farinha; Theon Lewis; Machel Cedenio | 3:06.02 | Jamaica; Ivan Henry; Okeen Williams; Marco Doodnaughtsingh; Nathon Allen | 3:07.71 | Bahamas; Kelso Pierre Jr. Janek Cartwright; Ashley Riley; Steven Gardiner | 3:11.32 |

^{†}: Open event for both junior and youth athletes.

=== Girls U-20 (Junior) ===
| Event | Gold | | Silver | | Bronze | |
|---|---|---|---|---|---|---|
| 100 metres (wind: 5.1 m/s) | Jonielle Smith; Jamaica | 11.17 w | Aaliyah Telesford; Trinidad and Tobago | 11.42 w | Kedisha Dallas; Jamaica | 11.44 w |
| 200 metres (wind: +2.3 m/s) | Kayelle Clarke; Trinidad and Tobago | 23.10 w | Kadecia Baird; Guyana | 23.13 w | Kedisha Dallas; Jamaica | 23.69 w |
| 400 metres | Kadecia Baird; Guyana | 53.84 | Dawnalee Loney; Jamaica | 53.90 | Yanique McNeil; Jamaica | 54.49 |
| 800 metres | Monique McPherson; Jamaica | 2:09.85 | Sasha-gaye Whyte; Jamaica | 2:13.19 | Cheryl Farial /Guadeloupe | 2:13.29 |
| 1500 metres | Sasha-gaye Whyte; Jamaica | 4:42.44 | Monique McPherson; Jamaica | 4:44.08 | Cheryl Farial /Guadeloupe | 4:44.76 |
| 3000 metres ^{†} | Cassey George; Guyana | 10:03.27 | Britnie Dixon; Jamaica | 10:34.20 | Shanieke Watson; Jamaica | 10:55.42 |
| 100 metres hurdles (84 cm) (wind: +0.2 m/s) | Akela Jones; Barbados | 13.55 | Peta-gay Williams; Jamaica | 13.57 | Chrystie Lange /Guadeloupe | 13.59 |
| 400 metres hurdles (76 cm) | Kimone Green; Jamaica | 58.47 | Andrenette Knight; Jamaica | 59.61 | Méghane Grandson /Martinique | 60.85 |
| High jump | Akela Jones; Barbados | 1.84 m | Safia Morgan; Jamaica | 1.78 m | Morgan Edvige /Martinique | 1.65 m |
| Long jump | Akela Jones; Barbados | 6.32 m (wind: +1.3 m/s) | Claudette Allen; Jamaica | 6.31 m w (wind: +2.4 m/s) | Mia Pontoparia /Guadeloupe | 6.02 m w (wind: +3.3 m/s) |
| Triple jump | Tamara Moncrieffe; Jamaica | 13.21 m (wind: -1.8 m/s) | Claudette Allen; Jamaica | 12.69 m (wind: -0.2 m/s) | Marine Vidal /Guadeloupe | 12.65 m (wind: -2.0 m/s) |
| Shot put (4.0 kg) | Rochelle Frazer; Jamaica | 13.63 m | Jess St. John; Antigua and Barbuda | 13.26 m | Portious Warren; Trinidad and Tobago | 12.70 m |
| Discus throw (1.0 kg) | Rochelle Frazer; Jamaica | 46.90 m | Paul-ann Gayle; Jamaica | 45.93 m | Tynelle Gumbs; British Virgin Islands | 40.45 m |
| Javelin throw (600g) | Olivia Leckford; Jamaica | 44.41 m | Isheka Binns; Jamaica | 43.32 m | Priscillia Fonds /Guadeloupe | 39.17 m |
| Heptathlon ^{†} | Chelsey Linton; Dominica | 4648 pts CR | Janel Fullerton; Jamaica | 4588 pts^{*} | Miquel Roach; Bahamas | 4365 pts |
| 4 × 100 metres relay | Jamaica; Chanice Bonner; Kedisha Dallas; Saqukine Cameron; Jonielle Smith | 44.16 | Trinidad and Tobago; Aaliya Telesford; Zakiya Denoon; Tsai-anne Joseph; Kayelle Clarke | 45.32 | Bahamas; Devynne Charlton; Loushany Neymour; Makeya White; Keianna Albury | 45.47 |
| 4 × 400 metres relay | Jamaica; Camira Haughton; Yanique McNeil; Andrenett Knight; Dawnalee Loney | 3:38.20 | Trinidad and Tobago; Ayoka Cummings; Tsai-anne Joseph; Shirnel Ettienne; Zakiya Denoon | 3:46.11 | Bahamas; Juannae Lewis; Loushany Neymour; Marisa White; Talia Thompson | 3:47.64 |

^{†}: Open event for both junior and youth athletes.
^{*}: Using youth implements.

=== Boys U-18 (Youth) ===
| Event | Gold | | Silver | | Bronze | |
|---|---|---|---|---|---|---|
| 100 metres (wind: +1.9 m/s)^{‡} | Raheem Chambers; Jamaica | 10.27 | Waseem Williams; Jamaica | 10.33 | Javan Martin; Bahamas | 10.54 |
| 200 metres (wind: +2.3 m/s) | Chad Walker; Jamaica | 20.99 w | Jhevaughn Matherson; Jamaica | 21.13 w | Javan Martin; Bahamas | 21.15 w |
| 400 metres | Martin Manley; Jamaica | 47.47 | Henri Delauze; Bahamas | 47.60 | Jamal Walton; Cayman Islands | 47.74 |
| 800 metres | Ryan Bulter; Jamaica | 1:55.61 | Ryan Dunkley; Jamaica | 1:56.03 | Romario Marshall; Barbados | 1:58.91 |
| 1500 metres | Jauvaney James; Jamaica | 4:07.81 | Benjamin Najman; Bahamas | 4:09.66 | Romario Marshall; Barbados | 4:09.72 |
| 3000 metres | Jauvaney James; Jamaica | 8:59.15 | Shane Buchanan; Jamaica | 9:07.22 | Luidgy Negre /Guadeloupe | 9:21.55 |
| 110 metres hurdles (91 cm) (wind: 2.2 m/s) | Jaheel Hyde; Jamaica | 13.10 w | Roje Jackson-Chin; Jamaica | 13.46 w | Michael Nicholls; Barbados | 13.79 w |
| 400 metres hurdles (84 cm) | Jaheel Hyde; Jamaica | 51.21 CR | Rivaldo Leacock; Barbados | 51.37 | Kyron McMaster; British Virgin Islands | 52.85 |
| High jump | Lusahane Wilson; Jamaica | 2.03 m | Jahnai Perinchief; Bermuda | 2.03 m | Omari Benoit; Trinidad and Tobago | 2.00 m |
| Long jump | Obrien Wasome; Jamaica | 7.66 m w (wind: +2.6 m/s) | Andweulle Wright; Trinidad and Tobago | 7.38 m (wind: +1.5 m/s) | Miguel van Assen; Suriname | 7.12 m (wind: +1.2 m/s) |
| Triple jump | Miguel van Assen; Suriname | 16.33 m (wind: +2.0 m/s) CR | Jordon Scott; Jamaica | 15.75 m w (wind: +2.4 m/s) | Obrien Wasome; Jamaica | 15.59 m (wind: +0.6 m/s) |
| Shot put (5.0 kg) | Vashon McCarty; Jamaica | 17.29 m | Josh Hazzard; Grenada | 15.94 m | Warren Barrett; Jamaica | 15.70 m |
| Discus throw (1.5 kg) | Vashon McCarty; Jamaica | 54.41 m CR | Warren Barrett; Jamaica | 53.67 m | Josh Boateng; Grenada | 47.84 m |
| Javelin throw (700g) | Anderson Peters; Grenada | 67.67 m CR | Mickel Joseph; Grenada | 67.23 m | Travis Ferguson; Bahamas | 60.40 m |
| 4 × 100 metres relay | Bahamas; Kinard Rolle; Tyler Bowe; Keanu Pennerman; Javan Martin | 40.76 =CR | Jamaica; Waseem Williams; Chad Walker; Jhevau Matherson; Raheem Chambers | 40.78 | Trinidad and Tobago; Chad Richards; Akanni Hislop; Corey Stewart; Adell Coltrust | 42.41 |
| 4 × 400 metres relay | Jamaica; Nathaniel Bann; Martin Manley; Nigel Ellis; Jaheel Hyde | 3:12.63 CR | Bahamas; Kinard Rolle; Samson Colebrooke; Justin Pinder; Henri Delauze | 3:13.16 | Trinidad and Tobago; Corey Stewart; Jacob St Clair; Terry Frederick; Kasfief King | 3:13.77 |

^{‡}: The result of the initial boy's U-18 100m final race was cancelled after problems at the start. The athletes complained that they heard two shots when starting. Therefore, the race was re run one day later.

=== Girls U-18 (Youth) ===
| Event | Gold | | Silver | | Bronze | |
|---|---|---|---|---|---|---|
| 100 metres (wind: +3.3 m/s) | Kimone Shaw; Jamaica | 11.42 w | Jenae Ambrose; Bahamas | 11.62 w | Nelda Huggins; British Virgin Islands | 11.64 w |
| 200 metres (wind: +0.9 m/s) | Natalliah White; Jamaica | 23.36 | Sada Williams; Barbados | 23.43 | Shellece Clarke; Jamaica | 23.61 |
| 400 metres | Sada Williams; Barbados | 53.39 | Tiffany James; Jamaica | 53.79 | Meleni Rodney; Grenada | 54.45 |
| 800 metres | Faheemah Scraders; Bermuda | 2:10.68 | Junelle Bromfield; Jamaica | 2:10.79 | Britnie Dixon; Jamaica | 2:13.33 |
| 1500 metres | Cassey George; Guyana | 4:40.40 | Faheemah Scraders; Bermuda | 4:43.30 | Britnie Dixon; Jamaica | 4:53.84 |
| 100 metres hurdles (76 cm) (wind: +1.4 m/s) | Janeek Brown; Jamaica | 13.48 CR | Sidney Marshall; Jamaica | 13.62 | Jeminise Parris; Trinidad and Tobago | 13.79 |
| 400 metres hurdles (76 cm) | Shenice Cohen; Jamaica | 59.72 CR | Shannon Kalawan; Jamaica | 59.95 | Dreshannae Rolle; Bahamas | 60.43 |
| High jump | Lamara Destin; Jamaica | 1.68 m | Jeanine Allard-Saint Albin /Martinique; Sakari Famous; Bermuda; Ashlee Edward; Saint Lucia | 1.60 m | | |
| Long jump | Yanis Esméralda David /Guadeloupe | 6.24 m (wind: NWI) CR ? | Kristal Liburd; Saint Kitts and Nevis | 6.01 m (wind: +1.8 m/s) | Maëva Phésor /Guadeloupe | 5.86 m w (wind: +2.9 m/s) |
| Triple jump | Yanis Esméralda David /Guadeloupe | 13.10 m (wind: +1.5 m/s) CR | Axelle Eugénie /Martinique | 12.34 m (wind: +0.9 m/s) | Shanique Wright; Jamaica | 12.26 m (wind: +1.0 m/s) |
| Shot put (3.0 kg) | Chelsea James; Trinidad and Tobago | 16.12 m CR | Janel Fullerton; Jamaica | 14.42 m | Akida Briggs; Trinidad and Tobago | 13.79 m |
| Discus throw (1.0 kg) | Janel Fullerton; Jamaica | 46.47 m CR | Chelsea James; Trinidad and Tobago | 43.53 m | Devia Brown; Jamaica | 43.31 m |
| Javelin throw (500g) | Shanee Angol; Dominica | 49.66 m CR | Hayley Matthews; Barbados | 43.17 m | Daneliz Thomas; Cayman Islands | 39.59 m |
| 4 × 100 metres relay | Jamaica; Shellece Clarke; Shanice Reid; Natalliah White; Kimone Shaw | 44.80 CR | Bahamas; Blayre Catalyn; Jenae Ambrose; Andira Ferguson; Brianne Bethel | 45.91 | British Virgin Islands; Frett Zacharia; Kala Penn; L'tisha Fahie; Nelda Huggins | 46.30 |
| 4 × 400 metres relay | Jamaica; Taqece Duggan; Junell Bromfield; Shannon Kalawan; Tiffany James | 3:37.65 CR | Bahamas; Shaquania Dorsett; Dreshannae Rolle; Brianne Bethel; Doneisha Anderson | 3:39.65 | Barbados; Shonita Brome; Sada Williams; Jaria Hoyte; Tiana Bowen | 3:41.90 |

== Medal table (unofficial) ==
The originally published official medal table differs slightly from the unofficial count displayed below in bronze medals (and consequently in the total number of medals) for Jamaica (+1), the Bahamas (-1), and Saint Lucia (-1) triggering some discussion. The medal count below was confirmed by a careful re-evaluation of the published results. Corrected medal numbers in accordance with those below for Jamaica and the Bahamas were published.

* Host nation (Host (Martinique))

| Rank | Nation | Gold | Silver | Bronze | Total |
|---|---|---|---|---|---|
| 1 | Jamaica | 42 | 34 | 13 | 89 |
| 2 | Trinidad and Tobago | 6 | 7 | 12 | 25 |
| 3 | Barbados | 5 | 5 | 6 | 16 |
| 4 | Guyana | 3 | 1 | 0 | 4 |
| 5 | /Guadeloupe | 3 | 0 | 8 | 11 |
| 6 | Dominica | 2 | 0 | 0 | 2 |
| 7 | Bahamas | 1 | 8 | 10 | 19 |
| 8 | Grenada | 1 | 3 | 2 | 6 |
| 9 | Bermuda | 1 | 3 | 1 | 5 |
| 10 | Saint Lucia | 1 | 1 | 0 | 2 |
| 11 | Suriname | 1 | 0 | 1 | 2 |
| 12 | /Martinique* | 0 | 3 | 5 | 8 |
| 13 | Saint Kitts and Nevis | 0 | 1 | 2 | 3 |
| 14 | Antigua and Barbuda | 0 | 1 | 0 | 1 |
| 14 | Curaçao | 0 | 1 | 0 | 1 |
| 16 | British Virgin Islands | 0 | 0 | 4 | 4 |
| 17 | Cayman Islands | 0 | 0 | 2 | 2 |
| Totals (17 entries) | | 66 | 68 | 66 | 200 |

== Participation ==
According to an unofficial count, athletes from 25 countries participated. Although invited, athletes from Belize and Montserrat could not be retrieved.

- Anguilla
- Antigua and Barbuda
- Aruba
- Bahamas
- Barbados
- Bonaire
- Bermuda
- British Virgin Islands
- Cayman Islands
- Curaçao
- Dominica
- /French Guiana
- Grenada
- /Guadeloupe
- Guyana
- (Haiti) Haïti
- Jamaica
- /Martinique
- Saint Kitts and Nevis
- Saint Lucia
- Saint Vincent and the Grenadines
- Sint Maarten
- Suriname
- Trinidad and Tobago
- Turks and Caicos Islands
- U.S. Virgin Islands
