= 2014 World Junior Championships in Athletics – Women's 100 metres =

The women's 100 metres at the 2014 World Junior Championships in Athletics was held at Hayward Field on 22 and 23 July.

== Medalists ==
Gold	Dina Asher-Smith; Great Britain
Silver	Ángela Tenorio; Ecuador
Bronze	Kaylin Whitney; United States

== Records ==
Standing records prior to the 2014 World Junior Championships in Athletics
World Junior Record	Marlies Göhr (GDR)	10.88	Dresden, East Germany	1 July 1977
Championship Record	Veronica Campbell-Brown (JAM)	11.12	Santiago, Chile	18 October 2000
World Junior Leading	Kaylin Whitney (USA)	11.10	Eugene, United States	5 July 2014
Broken records during the 2014 World Junior Championships in Athletics

== Results ==
=== Heats ===
Qualification: The first 3 of each heat (Q) and the 3 fastest times (q) qualified

Rank	Heat	Name	Nationality	Time	Note
1	5	Dina Asher-Smith	Great Britain	11.18	Q
2	8	Ángela Tenorio	Ecuador	11.27	q*
3	4	Desiree Henry	Great Britain	11.36	Q
4	1	Ewa Swoboda	Poland	11.42	Q, =NJR, NYR
5	7	Kaylin Whitney	United States	11.48	Q
6	4	Iréne Ekelund	Sweden	11.55	Q
7	6	Andrea Purica	Venezuela	11.59	Q, PB
8	3	Vitoria Cristina Rosa	Brazil	11.60	Q, PB
9	7	Anna Doi	Japan	11.65	Q
10	2	Ariana Washington	United States	11.67	Q
11	1	Kedisha Dallas	Jamaica	11.68	Q
11	5	Tamiris de Liz	Brazil	11.68	Q, SB
13	4	Floriane Gnafoua	France	11.69	Q, PB
14	5	Keianna Albury	Bahamas	11.70	Q
15	4	Brenessa Thompson	Guyana	11.71	q
16	1	Sade McCreath	Canada	11.72	Q, PB
17	2	Anne Sjoukje Runia	Netherlands	11.75	Q
17	7	Eva Berger	France	11.75	Q
17	3	Tebogo Mamathu	South Africa	11.75	Q
20	1	Cecilia Tamayo	Mexico	11.77	q
21	2	Cristina Lara	Spain	11.78	Q
21	5	Johanelis Herrera Abreu	Italy	11.78	q
23	5	Emilia Kjellberg	Sweden	11.79	PB
24	3	Aaliyah Telesford	Trinidad and Tobago	11.81	Q
25	6	Zakiya Denoon	Trinidad and Tobago	11.83	Q
26	2	Nelda Huggins	British Virgin Islands	11.87	
27	4	Brianne Bethel	Bahamas	11.88	
28	2	Tristan Evelyn	Barbados	11.91	
29	5	Olivia Fotopoulou	Cyprus	11.92	
30	2	Dayleen Santana	Puerto Rico	11.93	
30	6	Natasha Brown	Canada	11.93	Q
32	7	Lisa Marie Kwayie	Germany	11.95	
33	6	Hana Basic	Australia	11.96	
34	4	Paraskevi Andreou	Cyprus	11.97	
35	2	Simone du Plooy	South Africa	11.98	
35	6	Tegest Tamangnu	Ethiopia	11.98	
37	7	Ajla del Ponte	Switzerland	11.99	
38	6	Hu Chia-chen	Chinese Taipei	12.02	
39	1	Kayla Anise Richardson	Philippines	12.03	
40	5	Suzie Acolatse	Ghana	12.04	
41	7	Larissa Chambers	Australia	12.05	
42	1	Nina Braun	Germany	12.08	
43	1	Loungo Matlhaku	Botswana	12.12	
44	6	Marije van Hunenstijn	Netherlands	12.14	
45	4	Helene Rønningen	Norway	12.16	
46	3	Evelyn Rivera	Colombia	12.17	
47	3	Sayaka Adachi	Japan	12.24	
48	3	Alexandra Toth	Austria	12.26	
49	6	Ngosi Musa	Sierra Leone	12.28	
50	7	Quashira McIntosh	United States Virgin Islands	12.44	
51	3	Adrine Monagi	Papua New Guinea	12.79	
52	5	Im Lan Loi	Macau	12.83	PB
53	4	Aireen Akter	Bangladesh	13.52	PB
—N/a	1	Tiffany Tshilumba	Luxembourg	DNS	
—N/a	2	Ghislaine Amoda	Central African Republic	DNS	

- Tenorio was originally disqualified for a false start, but was reinstated and allowed to effectively run a solo time trial. As her time would have been sufficient to merit a non-automatic qualifying spot, an extra slot was created to ensure Abreu, the slowest of the existing 'non-automatic' qualifiers did not lose out.

=== Semifinals ===
Qualification: The first 2 of each heat (Q) and the 2 fastest times (q) qualified

Rank	Heat	Lane	Name	Nationality	Time	Note
1	2		Dina Asher-Smith	Great Britain	11.31	Q
2	1		Ángela Tenorio	Ecuador	11.32	Q
3	3		Kaylin Whitney	United States	11.44	Q
4	1		Desiree Henry	Great Britain	11.48	Q
5	3		Ewa Swoboda	Poland	11.51	Q
6	1		Iréne Ekelund	Sweden	11.64	q
7	1		Andrea Purica	Venezuela	11.70	q
8	1		Brenessa Thompson	Guyana	11.71	
9	1		Tamiris de Liz	Brazil	11.73	
9	2		Ariana Washington	United States	11.73	Q
11	2		Vitoria Cristina Rosa	Brazil	11.75	
12	3		Keianna Albury	Bahamas	11.76	
13	3		Kedisha Dallas	Jamaica	11.77	
14	3		Anna Doi	Japan	11.84	
15	3		Floriane Gnafoua	France	11.88	
16	3		Aaliyah Telesford	Trinidad and Tobago	11.94	
17	3		Natasha Brown	Canada	12.02	
17	2		Eva Berger	France	12.02	
19	2		Cecilia Tamayo	Mexico	12.10	
20	2		Cristina Lara	Spain	12.11	
21	2		Anne Sjoukje Runia	Netherlands	12.12	
21	2		Tebogo Mamathu	South Africa	12.12	
23	1		Zakiya Denoon	Trinidad and Tobago	12.13	
24	1		Sade McCreath	Canada	12.16	

=== Final ===
Wind: -1.0 m/s

Rank	Lane	Name	Nationality	Time	Note
1st place, gold medalist(s)		Dina Asher-Smith	Great Britain	11.23	
2nd place, silver medalist(s)		Ángela Tenorio	Ecuador	11.39	
3rd place, bronze medalist(s)		Kaylin Whitney	United States	11.45	
4		Desiree Henry	Great Britain	11.56	
5		Ewa Swoboda	Poland	11.59	
6		Iréne Ekelund	Sweden	11.61	
7		Ariana Washington	United States	11.65	
8		Andrea Purica	Venezuela	11.76	
