= 2015 CARIFTA Games =

XLIV CARIFTA Games
- Dates: 3–6 April
- Host city: Basseterre, Saint Kitts and Nevis
- Venue: Silver Jubilee Stadium
- Level: Junior and Youth
- Events: Junior: 35 (incl. 4 open), Youth: 31
- Participation: 499 athletes from 25 nations

The 2015 CARIFTA Games took place between 3 and 6 April 2015. The event was held at the Silver Jubilee Stadium in Bird Rock, south-eastern suburb of Basseterre, Saint Kitts and Nevis. During the games, the stadium was officially renamed the "Kim Collins National Athletic Stadium" in honour of the country's 2003 100m world champion Kim Collins. It was the second time after 2008 that the event was hosted by Saint Kitts and Nevis.

A report of the event was given for the IAAF.

== Austin Sealy Award ==
The Austin Sealy Trophy for the most outstanding athlete of the games was awarded to Mary Fraser, Barbados. She won three gold medals, 800 m and 1500m in the youth (U-18) category, as well as 3000m open for both junior and youth athletes.

== Medal summary ==
Complete results were published.

=== Boys U-20 (Junior) ===
Event	Gold		Silver		Bronze	
100 metres (+1.5 m/s)	Mario Burke; Barbados	10.21	Michael O'Hara; Jamaica	10.33	Raheem Chambers; Jamaica	10.44
200 metres (−0.6 m/s)	Mario Burke; Barbados	21.51	Reuberth Boyde; Saint Vincent and the Grenadines	21.70	Warren Hazel; Saint Kitts and Nevis	21.81
400 metres	Akeem Bloomfield; Jamaica	45.85	Rai Benjamin; Antigua and Barbuda	46.19	Henri Delauze; Bahamas	46.81
800 metres	Paul Tate; Jamaica	1:52.43	Justin Pinder; Bahamas	1:52.59	Devaughn Smith; Jamaica	1:52.59
1500 metres	Shevon Parks; Jamaica	3:56.69	Raheem Skinner; Barbados	3:58.19	Joshua Hunte; Barbados	3:59.39
5000 metres	Thaleentino Green; Jamaica	15:55.29	Tallan James; Grenada	16:01.57	Daniel Glave; Jamaica	16:16.24
110 metres hurdles (99.1 cm) (+3.3 m/s)	Jaheel Hyde; Jamaica	13.36 w	Xavier Coakley; Bahamas	13.51 w	Seanie Selvin; Jamaica	13.57 w
400 metres hurdles	Jaheel Hyde; Jamaica	50.96	Marvin Williams; Jamaica	51.11	Stephen Griffith; Barbados	51.77
High jump	Christoff Bryan; Jamaica	2.21m =CR	Laquarn Nairn; Bahamas	2.14m	Ace Louis; Saint Lucia	2.11m
Pole vault ^{†}	Akeem Kerr; Jamaica	4.10m	Jessy Voitier /Martinique	3.40m		
Long jump	Andwuelle Wright; Trinidad and Tobago	7.44m w (+2.1 m/s)	Obrien Wasome; Jamaica	7.41m (+1.8 m/s)	Nathaniel Huggins; Saint Kitts and Nevis	7.37m (+0.9 m/s)
Triple jump	Miguel van Assen; Suriname	16.24m (+0.7 m/s)	Obrien Wasome; Jamaica	15.85m w (+2.4 m/s)	Odaine Lewis; Jamaica	15.79m w (+3.3 m/s)
Shot put (6.0 kg)	Demar Gayle; Jamaica	19.24m	Sanjae Lawrence; Jamaica	17.92m	Lael Tirnan /Martinique	16.78m
Discus throw (1.75 kg)	Demar Gayle; Jamaica	53.45m	Josh Boateng; Grenada	51.14m	Drexel Maycock; Bahamas	51.14m
Javelin throw	Anderson Peters; Grenada	70.09m	Denzel Prah; Bahamas	66.48m	Denzel St Marthe; Saint Lucia	64.31m
Octathlon ^{†}	Shakiel Chattoo; Jamaica	5839 CR	Ramarco Thompson; Barbados	5639	Woodens Corvil; Turks and Caicos Islands	5572
4 × 100 metres relay	Jamaica; Raheem Chambers; Michael O'Hara; Chad Walker; Nigel Ellis	40.39	Bahamas; Xavier Coakley; Tyler Bowe; Ken Russell; Stephen Green	40.41	Trinidad and Tobago; Gervais Ford; Xavier Mulugata; Francis Louis; Jonathon Farinha	40.55
4 × 400 metres relay	Jamaica; Marvin Williams; Jaheel Hyde; Terry Thomas; Michael O'Hara	3:09.13	Bahamas; Henri Delauze; Justin Pinder; Jordan Minnis; Stephen Green	3:12.33	Trinidad and Tobago	3:15.77

^{†}: Open event for both junior and youth athletes.

=== Girls U-20 (Junior) ===
Event	Gold		Silver		Bronze	
100 metres (+0.5 m/s)	Natalliah Whyte; Jamaica	11.56	Keianna Albury; Bahamas	11.64	Jenae Ambrose; Bahamas	11.74
200 metres (+4.3 m/s)	Kayelle Clarke; Trinidad and Tobago	23.12 w	Saqukine Cameron; Jamaica	23.32 w	Keianna Albury; Bahamas	23.49 w
400 metres	Shaquania Dorsett; Bahamas	53.40	Dawnalee Loney; Jamaica	53.58	Tiffany James; Jamaica	53.71
800 metres	Shaquania Dorsett; Bahamas	2:11.99	Faheemah Kyrah Scraders; Bermuda	2:12.16	Lisa Buchanan; Jamaica	2:13.26
1500 metres	Lisa Buchanan; Jamaica	4:39.50	Sasha-Gaye Whyte; Jamaica	4:40.66	Faheemah Kyrah Scraders; Bermuda	4:41.76
3000 metres ^{†}	Mary Fraser; Barbados	10:27.91	Shakeba Pink; Sint Maarten	10:32.72	Elizabeth Williams; Barbados	10:33.45
100 metres hurdles (+4.8 m/s)	Yanique Thompson; Jamaica	13.21 w	Jeanine Williams; Jamaica	13.40 w	Jeminise Parris; Trinidad and Tobago	13.85 w
400 metres hurdles	Andrenette Knight; Jamaica	1:00.52	Shannon Kalawan; Jamaica	1:01.01	Jonel Lacey; British Virgin Islands	1:01.26
High jump	Safia Morgan; Jamaica	1.76m	Khemani Roberts; Trinidad and Tobago	1.73m	Shanae McKenzie; Jamaica	1.73m
Long jump	Kristal Liburd; Saint Kitts and Nevis	6.11m (+1.1 m/s)	Danielle Gibson; Bahamas	5.99m (+1.1 m/s)	Rechelle Meade; Anguilla	5.98m (+1.3 m/s)
Triple jump	Tamara Moncrieffe; Jamaica	13.44m w (+5.8 m/s)	Yanis David /Guadeloupe	13.40m (+1.4 m/s) CR	Danielle Gibson; Bahamas	13.05m (+1.6 m/s)
Shot put	Portious Warren; Trinidad and Tobago	15.22m	Trevia Gumbs; British Virgin Islands	14.83m NR	Chelsea James; Trinidad and Tobago	14.73m
Discus throw	Shanice Love; Jamaica	49.39m	Rochelle Frazer; Jamaica	46.86m	Emeline Tedos /Martinique	41.00m
Javelin throw	Isheeka Binns; Jamaica	49.72m CR	Ayesha Champagnie; Jamaica	47.51m	Candesha Scott; Grenada	45.58m
Heptathlon ^{†}	Ayesha Champagnie; Jamaica	5231 CR	Zinedine Russell; Jamaica	4776	Priscilla Fond /Guadeloupe	4527
4 × 100 metres relay	Jamaica; Jeanine Williams; Yanique Thompson; Saqukine Cameron; Natalliah Whyte	45.20	Bahamas; Jerinique Brookes; Jenae Ambrose; Alexis Gray; Keianna Albury	45.59	Trinidad and Tobago; Jeunice Maxime; Kadesha Prescott; Thyla-Maree Scott; Kayelle Clarke	47.64
4 × 400 metres relay	Jamaica; Yeaschea Williams; Tiffany James; Andrenette Knight; Dawnalee Loney	3:37.96	British Virgin Islands; Lakeisha Warner; Tarika Moses; Taylor Hill; Jonel Lacey	3:46.43	Trinidad and Tobago; Thyla-Maree Scott; Kayelle Clarke; Jeunice Maxime; Jeminise Parris	3:47.55

^{†}: Open event for both junior and youth athletes.

=== Boys U-18 (Youth) ===
Event	Gold		Silver		Bronze	
100 metres (+0.3 m/s)	Javan Martin; Bahamas	10.41	Akanni Hislop; Trinidad and Tobago	10.47	Tyreke Wilson; Jamaica	10.56
200 metres (+1.8 m/s)	Akanni Hislop; Trinidad and Tobago	20.91	Javan Martin; Bahamas	21.16	Xavior Angus; Jamaica	21.17
400 metres	Christopher Taylor; Jamaica	46.64 CR	Jacob St Clair; Trinidad and Tobago	46.73	Devaughn Ellington; Jamaica	47.43
800 metres	Leon Clarke; Jamaica	1:56.75	Jauavney James; Jamaica	1:58.21	Jonathan Jones; Barbados	1:58.43
1500 metres	Shemar Salmon; Jamaica	4:02.98	Jonathan Jones; Barbados	4:04.03	Keemon Lawrence; Jamaica	4:04.98
3000 metres	Keemon Lawrence; Jamaica	8:55.64	Shemar Salmon; Jamaica	9:03.06	Dominic Dyer; Cayman Islands	9:09.41
110 metres hurdles (91.4 cm) (NWI)	Tavonte Mott; Bahamas	13.1 (ht) CR	Jordan Roberts; Jamaica	13.2 (ht)	Rivaldo Leacock; Barbados	13.3 (ht)
400 metres hurdles (83.8 cm)	Rivaldo Leacock; Barbados	51.34	Jauavney James; Jamaica	53.18	Aljani Bridgewater; Saint Kitts and Nevis	53.44
High jump	Lushane Wilson; Jamaica	2.11m	Jermaine Francis; Saint Kitts and Nevis	2.06m	Enzo Hodebar^{‡} /Guadeloupe	2.00m^{‡}
Long jump	Pakito Dudley; Jamaica	7.03m w (+2.5 m/s)	Shammawi Wellington; Jamaica	7.02m w (+2.6 m/s)	Clement Campbell; Trinidad and Tobago	6.86m (+0.9 m/s)
Triple jump	Tamar Green; Bahamas	15.21m (+0.1 m/s)	Enzo Hodebar /Guadeloupe	15.11m (+0.8 m/s)	Pakito Dudley; Jamaica	14.68m w (+2.4 m/s)
Shot put (5.0 kg)	Isaiah Taylor; Trinidad and Tobago	17.56m CR	Kevin Nedrick; Jamaica	17.44m	Kyle Mitchell; Jamaica	17.03m
Discus throw (1.5 kg)	Deondre Rutherford; Bahamas	47.41m	Adrian Thomas; Grenada	47.40m	Johann Jeremiah; Grenada	46.34m
Javelin throw (700g)	Tyriq Hosford; Trinidad and Tobago	70.73m CR	Kevin Nedrick; Jamaica	65.09m	Vandel Joseph; Trinidad and Tobago	61.67m
4 × 100 metres relay	Jamaica; Tyreke Wilson; Xavior Angus; Rushane Edwards; De'Jour Russell	40.52 CR	Trinidad and Tobago; Jalen Purcell; Akanni Hislop; Jerod Elcock; Tyrell Edwards	41.43	Bahamas; Jonathon Smith; Javan Martin; Poitier Kaze; Donovan Storr	41.77
4 × 400 metres relay^{*}	Jamaica^{*} Leonardo Ledgister; Devaughn Ellington; Jauavney James; Christopher Taylor	3:12.07 CR	Trinidad and Tobago; Kobe John; Terry Frederick; Judah Taylor; Jacob St Clair	3:14.23	Bahamas^{*} Bradley Dormeus; Poitier Kaze; Byron Wilson; Donovan Storr	3:18.12

^{‡}: It is reported that there is a tie for the bronze medal in high jump. However, it is also reported that Enzo Hodebar from Guadeloupe cleared the 2.00m in the first attempt, while Aaron Worrell from Barbados cleared the 2.00m in the third attempt, what should have broken the tie.
^{*}: Initially, the U-18 4 × 400 m relay teams from Jamaica and the Bahamas were disqualified resulting in gold for Trinidad and Tobago, silver for the Cayman Islands (3:20.86) and bronze for Saint Kitts and Nevis (3:24.95). However, after successful protests, both teams were reinstated in the medal ranks.

=== Girls U-18 (Youth) ===
Event	Gold		Silver		Bronze	
100 metres (+1.3 m/s)	Shellece Clark; Jamaica	11.50	Tristan Evelyn; Barbados	11.54	Brianne Bethel; Bahamas; Shaneil English; Jamaica	11.63
200 metres (+1.5 m/s)	Shaneil English; Jamaica	23.38	Brianne Bethel; Bahamas	23.47	Kimone Shaw; Jamaica	23.89
400 metres	Junelle Bromfield; Jamaica	53.48	Sanique Walker; Jamaica	54.23	Meleni Rodney; Grenada	54.56
800 metres	Mary Fraser; Barbados	2:11.63	Chrissani May; Jamaica	2:13.28	Reanda Richards; Saint Kitts and Nevis	2:14.48
1500 metres	Mary Fraser; Barbados	4:41.44	Britnie Dickson; Jamaica	4:44.39	Jeima Davis; Jamaica	4:50.64
100 metres hurdles (76.2 cm) (+1.2 m/s)	Janeek Brown; Jamaica	13.29 CR	Jessie Zali /Martinique	13.70	Kieshonna Brooks; Saint Kitts and Nevis	13.71
400 metres hurdles	Junelle Bromfield; Jamaica	59.55 CR	Sanique Walker; Jamaica	1:02.40	Cheziah Phillip; Trinidad and Tobago	1:07.98
High jump	Shiann Salmon; Jamaica	1.73m	Doneisha Anderson; Bahamas	1.71m	Sakari Famous^{‡} Bermuda; Lamara Distin^{‡} Jamaica	1.68m^{‡}
Long jump	Charisma Taylor; Bahamas	5.93m w (+3.1 m/s)	Kieshonna Brooks; Saint Kitts and Nevis	5.72m w (+3.4 m/s)	Ave-Anna Venair; Jamaica	5.66m w (+3.0 m/s)
Triple jump	Charisma Taylor; Bahamas	12.01m (+0.3 m/s)	Zainy Nelzon; Suriname	11.88m w (+4.3 m/s)	Nichioner George; Grenada	11.75m w (+3.4 m/s)
Shot put (3.0 kg)	Sahjay Stevens; Jamaica	16.31m CR	Akidah Briggs; Trinidad and Tobago	15.09m	Laquell Harris; Bahamas	14.54m
Discus throw	Devia Brown; Jamaica	48.78m	Shyledeen Smith; Jamaica	44.83m	Serena Brown; Bahamas	44.20m
Javelin throw (500g)	Hayley Matthews; Barbados	47.37m	Asha James; Trinidad and Tobago	45.12m	Shanee Angol; Dominica	43.55m
4 × 100 metres relay	Jamaica; Janeek Brown; Shaneil English; Shellece Clark; Kimone Shaw	45.33	Trinidad and Tobago; Akeera Esdelle; Deleth Charles; Jendayi Noel; Shikyla Walcott	47.10	/Guadeloupe; Judy Chalcou; Océane Frédéric; Kaëlle Bourguignon; Naëlle Selbonne	47.41
4 × 400 metres relay	Jamaica; Junelle Bromfield; Satanya Wright; Shanique Walker; Anna-Kay Allen	3:39.13	Bahamas; Doneisha Anderson; Britni Fountain; Brianne Bethel; D'Nia Freeman	3:40.58	Saint Kitts and Nevis; Hanah Mills; Reanda Richards; Namibia Clavier; Kieshonna Brooks	3:51.26

^{‡}: It is reported that there is a tie resulting in four bronze medallists in high jump. However, only Sakari Famous from Bermuda and Lamara Distin from Jamaica cleared the 1.68m in the second attempt and all other heights in the first attempt. Daejha Moss from the Bahamas cleared both the 1.68m and the 1.65m in the second attempt, while Anelia Austrie from Dominica cleared the 1.68m in the third and the 1.65m in the second attempt. Consequently, there should be only two bronze medals.

== Medal table (unofficial) ==
The host country is highlighted in lavender blue

Rank	Nation	Gold	Silver	Bronze	Total
1	Jamaica	42	25	19	86
2	Bahamas	8	13	10	31
3	Barbados	7	4	5	16
4	Trinidad and Tobago	6	8	9	23
5	Grenada	1	3	4	8
6	Saint Kitts and Nevis*	1	2	6	9
7	Suriname	1	1	0	2
8	Guadeloupe	0	2	3	5
9	Martinique	0	2	2	4
10	British Virgin Islands	0	2	1	3
11	Bermuda	0	1	2	3
12	Antigua and Barbuda	0	1	0	1
12	Saint Vincent and the Grenadines	0	1	0	1
12	Sint Maarten	0	1	0	1
15	Saint Lucia	0	0	2	2
16	Anguilla	0	0	1	1
16	Cayman Islands	0	0	1	1
16	Dominica	0	0	1	1
16	Turks and Caicos Islands	0	0	1	1
Totals (19 entries)		66	66	67	199

== Participation ==
According to an unofficial count, 499 athletes from 25 countries participated. (Relay teams not completely known).

- Anguilla (5)
- Antigua and Barbuda (15)
- Aruba (4)
- Bahamas (53)
- Barbados (27)
- Bermuda (12)
- British Virgin Islands (14)
- Cayman Islands (20)
- Curaçao (29)
- Dominica (11)
- /French Guiana (4)
- Grenada (19)
- /Guadeloupe (22)
- Guyana (1)
- (Haiti) Haïti (1)
- Jamaica (80)
- /Martinique (16)
- Saint Kitts and Nevis (34)
- Saint Lucia (8)
- Saint Vincent and the Grenadines (2)
- Sint Maarten (6)
- Suriname (17)
- Trinidad and Tobago (65)
- Turks and Caicos Islands (18)
- U.S. Virgin Islands (16)
