= 2016 CARIFTA Games =

XLV CARIFTA Games
- Dates: 26–28 March
- Host city: St. George's, Grenada
- Venue: Grenada National Stadium
- Level: Junior and Youth
- Events: Junior: 35 (incl. 4 open), Youth: 31
- Participation: 25 nations

The 2016 CARIFTA Games took place between 26 and 28 March 2016. The event was held at the Grenada National Stadium in St. George's, Grenada.

== Austin Sealy Award ==
The Austin Sealy Trophy for the most outstanding athlete of the games was awarded to Anderson Peters of Grenada

== Medal summary ==
=== Boys U-20 (Junior) ===
Event	Gold		Silver		Bronze	
100 metres (+1.4 m/s)	Nigel Ellis; Jamaica	10.16	Mario Burke; Barbados	10.29	Raheem Chambers; Jamaica	10.35
200 metres (+4.5 m/s)	Akanni Hislop; Trinidad and Tobago	20.89 w	Keanu Pennerman; Bahamas	21.03 w	Coull Graham; Antigua and Barbuda	21.05 w
400 metres	Akeem Bloomfield; Jamaica	46.01	Jamal Walton; Cayman Islands	46.23	Kinard Rolle; Bahamas	46.88
800 metres	Shevan Parkes; Jamaica	1:51.76	Nathan Brown; Jamaica	1:52.99	Nathan Hood; Grenada	1:53.61
1500 metres	Shevan Parks; Jamaica	3:56.73	Kristoff Darby; Jamaica	4:03.76	Romario Marshall; Barbados	4:06.01
5000 metres	Benjamin Najman; Bahamas	15:24.25	Shane Buchanan; Jamaica	15:32.25	Garfield Gordon; Jamaica	15:41.43
110 metres hurdles (99.1 cm) (+0.9 m/s)	Rohan Cole; Jamaica	13.71	Tavonte Mott; Bahamas	13.81	Shakeem Smith; Bahamas	14.12
400 metres hurdles	Timor Barrett; Jamaica	51.79	Rivaldo Leacock; Barbados	52.07	Jauvaney James; Jamaica	53.56
High jump	Jermaine Francis; Saint Kitts and Nevis	2.11m	Lushane Wilson; Jamaica	2.08m	Romario Douglas; Jamaica	2.05m
Pole vault ^{†}	Dane Smith; Jamaica	4.00m	Douvankiylin Rolle; Bahamas	3.70m	Ramel Poitier; Bahamas	3.60m
Long jump	Miguel van Assen; Suriname	7.66m (+0.3 m/s)	O'Brien Wasome; Jamaica	7.52m (-1.1 m/s)	Shown-D Thompson; Jamaica	7.45m (-0.3 m/s)
Triple jump	O'Brien Wasome; Jamaica	16.09m (-0.9 m/s)	Jordan Scott; Jamaica	16.01m (+0.2 m/s)	Jordan Caraman; Martinique	15.03m (-0.8 m/s)
Shot put (6.0 kg)	Warren Barrett; Jamaica	19.97m CR	Sanjae Lawrence; Jamaica	18.89m	Josh Hazzard; Grenada	16.95m
Discus throw (1.75 kg)	Josh Boateng; Grenada	57.19m	Kevin Nedrick; Jamaica	53.53m	Malik Stuart; Bahamas	52.18m
Javelin throw	Anderson Peters; Grenada	78.28m CR	Markim Felix; Grenada	69.41m	Kalvin Marcus; Barbados	61.99m
Octathlon ^{†}	Kendrick Thompson; Bahamas	5849 CR	Marcus Brown; Jamaica	5800	Ken Mullings; Bahamas	5560
4 × 100 metres relay	Jamaica; Raheem Chambers; Rohan Cole; Andel Miller; Nigel Ellis	39.74	Bahamas; Keanu Pennerman; Samson Colebrooke; Javan Martin; Kendrick Thompson	40.27	Barbados; Ramarco Thompson; Jaquone Hoyte; Kevin Briggs; Mario Burke	40.97
4 × 400 metres relay	Jamaica; Jauvaney James; Timor Barrett; Nathan Brown; Akeem Bloomfield	3:10.55	Bahamas; Kinard Rolle; Kendrick Thompson; Holland Martin; Bradley Dormeus	3:12.99	Barbados; Ramarco Thompson; Romario Marshall; Akeem Marshall; Kevin Briggs	3:19.63

^{†}: Open event for both junior and youth athletes.

=== Girls U-20 (Junior) ===
Event	Gold		Silver		Bronze	
100 metres (-2.7 m/s)	Khalifa St. Fort; Trinidad and Tobago	11.40	Patrice Moody; Jamaica	11.68	Brianne Bethel; Bahamas	11.75
200 metres (+2.4 m/s)	Sada Williams; Barbados	22.72 w	Jenae Ambrose; Bahamas	23.39 w	Kimone Hines; Jamaica	23.85 w
400 metres	Sada Williams; Barbados	52.07	Shaquania Dorsett; Bahamas	52.50	Tiffany James; Jamaica	52.70
800 metres	Junelle Bromfield; Jamaica	2:06.21	Tarika Moses; British Virgin Islands	2:11.20	Andrea Foster; Guyana	2:12.53
1500 metres	Asshani Robb; Jamaica	4:39.20	Elizabeth Williams; Barbados	4:40.28	Andrea Foster; Guyana	4:45.53
3000 metres^{†}	Britnie Dixon; Jamaica	10:16.90	Monifa Green; Jamaica	10:17.00	Elizabeth Williams; Barbados	10:18.48
100 metres hurdles (+2.8 m/s)	Rushelle Burton; Jamaica	13.36 w	Sidney Marshall; Jamaica	13.73 w	Jeminise Parris; Trinidad and Tobago	13.73 w
400 metres hurdles	Shannon Kalawan; Jamaica	56.29	Lakeisha Warner; British Virgin Islands	58.14	Nicolee Foster; Jamaica	58.34
High jump	Ashanti Phillips; Barbados	1.73m	Britny Kerr; Jamaica	1.73m	Rechelle Meade; Anguilla	1.65m
Long jump	Yanis David; Guadeloupe	6.48m (0.3 m/s)	Jessica Noble; Jamaica	6.20m (-0.5 m/s)	Tissanna Hickling; Jamaica	5.84m (+0.3 m/s)
Triple jump	Yanis David; Guadeloupe	13.13m (-1.5 m/s)	Natricia Hooper; Guyana	12.19m (-0.4 m/s)	Tissanna Hickling; Jamaica	12.17m (+0.2 m/s)
Shot put	Janell Fullerton; Jamaica	14.52m	Sahjay Stevens; Jamaica	13.74m	Chelsea James; Trinidad and Tobago	13.66m
Discus throw	Shanice Love; Jamaica	52.05m	Davia Brown; Jamaica	46.66m	Serena Brown; Bahamas	45.97m
Javelin throw	Candesha Scott; Grenada	51.13m CR	Shanee Angol; Dominica	42.41m	Sahjay Stevens; Jamaica	41.91m
Heptathlon ^{†}	Janell Fullerton; Jamaica	4597	Zinedine Russell; Jamaica	4524	Anya Akili; Trinidad and Tobago	4471
4 × 100 metres relay	Jamaica; Kimone Hines; Patrice Moody; Shanice Reid; Rushelle Burton	44.30	Bahamas; Kaylea Albury; Taj Dorsett; Jenae Ambrose; Brianne Bethel	45.62	Trinidad and Tobago; Sarah Wollaston; Jada Barker; Jeminise Parris; Renee Stoddard	46.68
4 × 400 metres relay	Jamaica; Satanya Wright; Semoy Hemmings; Junelle Bromfield; Tiffany James	3:34.84	Bahamas; Shaquania Dorsett; Jenae Ambrose; Brittni Bethel; Brianne Bethel	3:48.06	Grenada; Olive Charles; Chelsea Mitchell; Shikkira Charles; Ariel St. John	4:11.10

^{†}: Open event for both junior and youth athletes.

=== Boys U-18 (Youth) ===
Event	Gold		Silver		Bronze	
100 metres (+1.4 m/s)	Jhevaughn Matherson; Jamaica	10.42	Dejour Russell; Jamaica	10.60	Adell Colthrust; Trinidad and Tobago	10.66
200 metres (-1.9 m/s)	Michael Stephens; Jamaica	21.43	Tyrell Edwards; Trinidad and Tobago	21.56	Matthew Clarke; Barbados	21.75
400 metres	Christopher Taylor; Jamaica	47.36	Antoni Hoyte-Small; Barbados	48.23	Onal Mitchell; Trinidad and Tobago	48.72
800 metres	Jonathon Jones; Barbados	1:49.88 CR	Anthony Cox; Jamaica	1:52.23	Lidji Mbaye; Guadeloupe	1:53.03
1500 metres	Jonathon Jones; Barbados	3:57.19 CR	Keenan Lawrence; Jamaica	3:59.64	Dominic Dyer; Cayman Islands	4:01.74
3000 metres	Keenan Lawrence; Jamaica	9:05.71	Dominic Dyer; Cayman Islands	9:06.33	Kalique St Jean; Antigua and Barbuda	9:11.49
110 metres hurdles (91.4 cm) (3.7 m/s)	Damion Thomas; Jamaica	13.32	Branson Rolle; Bahamas	13.80	Rasheem Brown; Cayman Islands	14.05
400 metres hurdles (84 cm)	Rasheeme Griffith; Barbados	52.22	Nathan Fergusson; Barbados	53.56	Dashinelle Dyer; Jamaica	54.05
High jump	Jyles Etienne; Bahamas	2.07m	Kobe-Jordan Rhooms; Jamaica	2.06m	Benjamin Clarke; Bahamas	2.03m
Long jump	Denvaughn Whymns; Bahamas	7.16m (+0.6 m/s)	Enzo Hodebar; Guadeloupe	7.09m (-2.0 m/s)	Shakwon Coke; Jamaica	7.05m (0.0 m/s)
Triple jump	Enzo Hodebar; Guadeloupe	15.14m (+1.2 m/s)	Gamali Felix; Grenada	14.55m (+4.5 m/s)	Anderson Greaves; Barbados	14.36m (+1.0 m/s)
Shot put (5.0 kg)	Zico Campbell; Jamaica	17.75m CR	Rasheeda Downer; Jamaica	17.57m	Triston Gibbons; Barbados	16.64m
Discus throw (1.50 kg)	Phillipe Barnett; Jamaica	60.44m CR	Roje Stona; Jamaica	55.30m	Xavero van Bosse; Suriname	50.38m
Javelin throw (700 gr)	Tyriq Horsford; Trinidad and Tobago	73.00m CR	Keyon Burton; Dominica	64.87m	Adrian Thomas; Grenada	60.97m
4 × 100 metres relay	Jamaica; Christopher Taylor; Michael Stephens; Dejour Russell; Jhevaughn Matherson	40.40 CR	Bahamas; Trenton Ambrose; Javaughn Culmer; Shaqiel Higgs; Adrian Curry	41.42	Grenada; Jamol Allen; Yacob John; Deron Phillip; Nathaniel Mark	41.89
4 × 400 metres relay	Jamaica; Dashinelle Dyer; Anthony Cox; Jhevaughn Matherson; Christopher Taylor	3:12.54	Barbados; Rasheeme Griffith; Antoni Hoyte-Small; Nathan Fergusson; Jonathon Jones	3:13.16	Trinidad and Tobago; Recardo Prescott; Onal Mitchell; Che Lara; Jaden St. Louis	3:15.33

=== Girls U-18 (Youth) ===
Event	Gold		Silver		Bronze	
100 metres (+1.0 m/s)	Kimone Shaw; Jamaica	11.56	Devine Parker; Bahamas	11.77	Joella Lloyd; Antigua and Barbuda	11.90
200 metres (0.0 m/s)	Shaniel English; Jamaica	23.65	Britany Anderson; Jamaica	23.74	Devine Parker; Bahamas	23.86
400 metres	Stacey-Ann Williams; Jamaica	54.00	Amanda Crawford; Grenada	54.16	Britni Fountain; Bahamas	54.68
800 metres	Cemore Donald; Jamaica	2:10.66	Chrisanni May; Jamaica	2:13.90	Quanisha Marshall; Bahamas	2:14.64
1500 metres	Cemore Donald; Jamaica	4:42.61	Britnie Dixon; Jamaica	4:43.53	Shakeba Pink; Sint Maarten	4:47.72
100 metres hurdles (76 cm) (+3.9 m/s)	Daszay Freeman; Jamaica	13.44 w	Sasha Wells; Bahamas	13.48 w	Joda Campbell; Jamaica	13.78 w
400 metres hurdles (76 cm)	Shiann Salmon; Jamaica	59.50 CR	Sanique Walker; Jamaica	59.60	Gabrielle Gibson; Bahamas	1:01.16
High jump	Shiann Salmon; Jamaica	1.82mm	Lamara Distin; Jamaica	1.77m	Sakari Famous; Bermuda	1.77m
Long jump	Britany Anderson; Jamaica	6.02m (+0.4 m/s)	Chantoba Bright; Guyana	5.94m (-0.4 m/s)	Annia Ashley; Jamaica	5.91m (+0.8 m/s)
Triple jump	Charisma Taylor; Bahamas	12.53m (-1.4 m/s)	Chantoba Bright; Guyana	12.39m (+3.0 m/s) w	Nichioner George; Grenada	11.95m (-2.1 m/s)
Shot put (3.0 kg)	Lacee Barnes; Cayman Islands	14.49m	Ianna Roach; Trinidad and Tobago	14.49m	Aiko Jones; Jamaica	14.32m
Discus throw	Aiko Jones; Jamaica	46.49m	Lacee Barnes; Cayman Islands	43.67m	Tiffany Hanna; Bahamas	39.80m
Javelin throw (500 gr)	Daneliz Thomas; Cayman Islands	45.97m	Holly Charles; Grenada	44.75m	Asha James; Trinidad and Tobago	44.44m
4 × 100 metres relay	Jamaica; Michae Harriott; Dasazay Freeman; Shaniel English; Kimone Shaw	45.87	Bahamas; Kennedy Culmer; Megan Moss; Devine Parker; Sasha Wells	46.37	Trinidad and Tobago; Akeera Esdelle; Akila Lewis; Shania McCarter; Janea Spinks	47.27
4 × 400 metres relay	Jamaica; Shanoi Powell; Shiann Salmon; Stacey-Ann Williams; Sanique Walker	3:39.31	Bahamas; D'Nia Freeman; Megan Moss; Gabrielle Gibson; Britni Fountain	3:43.08	British Virgin Islands; Judine Lacey; Zacharia Frett; Shaniyah Caul; Beyonce DeFreitas	3:47.43
