= Kaylin Whitney =

American sprinter

Personal information
- Nationality: American
- Born: March 9, 1998 (age 28)
- Height: 5 ft 8 in (1.73 m)
- Weight: 141 lb (64 kg)

Sport
- Sport: Running
- Event: Sprints
- Club: Star Athletics

Achievements and titles
- Personal best(s): 100 m: 11.10 (Eugene 2014); 200 m: 22.47 (Eugene 2015)
Medal record
Women's athletics
Representing the United States
Olympic Games
Gold medal – first place	2020 Tokyo	4 × 400 m relay
Bronze medal – third place	2020 Tokyo	4 × 400 m mixed
World Championships
Gold medal – first place	2022 Eugene	4 × 400 m relay
Pan American Games
Gold medal – first place	2015 Toronto	200 m
NACAC Championships
Gold medal – first place	2022 Freeport	4 × 400 m relay
Gold medal – first place	2022 Freeport	4 × 400 mixed relay
World Junior Championships
Gold medal – first place	2014 Oregon	200 m
Gold medal – first place	2014 Oregon	4 × 100 m relay
Bronze medal – third place	2014 Oregon	100 m

Kaylin Whitney (born March 9, 1998) is an American track and field athlete, specializing in sprinting events. Over a two-day period, at the USATF Junior Championships in Eugene, Oregon, July 5 and 6, 2014, she set the world youth bests for 100 meters and 200 meters. Her 100-meter time, set on July 5 was 11.10 with an aiding wind of +0.9 mps. Her 200-meter time was 22.49 was set on July 6 with an aiding wind of +1.3. Youth bests can be set by athletes who will not reach their 18th birthday within the calendar year of competition. Her "bests" will also count as bests on the continental and national level.

== Professional ==
Whitney placed 16th in the 100 meters at 2016 United States Olympic Trials (track and field) in 11.15 and 11th in the 200 meters at 2016 United States Olympic Trials (track and field) in 23.03.

Whitney placed fourth in 200 meters at 2015 USA Outdoor Track and Field Championships in 22.47 behind winner Jenna Prandini 22.20, runner-up Candyce McGrone 22.38 and Jeneba Tarmoh 22.44. Whitney placed 17th in 100 meters at 2015 USA Outdoor Track and Field Championships in 11.18. In March 2015, Kaylin Whitney signed with Nike.

Whitney ran a new career best of 50.29 seconds in the 400 m at the 2021 Olympic Trials, good enough for fifth place and a spot representing the United States on the 4 × 400 m relay team for the 2021 Tokyo Olympics.

== High school ==
Her 100 meters time also sets the national high school record as recognized by Track and Field News, though it will not be recognized by the NFHS as the USATF Junior Championships are not a high school competition. When published (the approval process by the magazine), the 200 meter record will be notated as a "low altitude" record by T&FN. Allyson Felix did run a faster 200 meters 22.11 at altitude in Mexico City before graduating from Los Angeles Baptist High School in 2003. Olympic gold medalist Felix is just one of the who's who of Olympians Whitney surpassed with the various records. Also on the list, the World Youth best in the 100 was held by Chandra Cheeseborough, the 200 best was held by Marion Jones, and the high school 100 m record was held by Angela Williams.

At the time of her performance, her 200-meter time ranked her as the #8 time of the year against all women of any age, her 100 m ranked #17.

While still a sophomore at East Ridge High School in Clermont, Florida, she was the 2014 Florida state champion in both events. As a youth athlete, Whitney was a star before reaching high school. In 2012, she set the American age 14 records in both the 100 m and 200 m in similar fashion, a day apart, destroying the youth records of future Olympic gold medalist, Sanya Richards. She trains with an elite group of athletes which includes Olympic gold medalist Justin Gatlin called Star Athletics coached by Olympic gold medalist Dennis Mitchell. She was Track and Field News "High School Athlete of the Year" in 2014.
