= Andrés Arroyo (athlete) =

Puerto Rican track athlete (born 1995)

Personal information
- Nationality: Puerto Rican
- Born: June 7, 1995 (age 31) Bayamón, Puerto Rico
- Height: 5 ft 8 in (173 cm)

Sport
- Sport: Track
- Event(s): 800 meters, 1500 meters
- College team: Florida

Achievements and titles
- Personal best(s): 800 meters: 1:45.78; 1500 meters: 3:44.54
Medal record
Men's athletics
Representing Puerto Rico
CAC Junior Championships
Gold medal – first place	2014 Morelia	800 m
Bronze medal – third place	2014 Morelia	1500 m
Silver medal – second place	2014 Morelia	4×400 m relay
CAC Youth Championships
Silver medal – second place	2012 San Salvador	800 m
Gold medal – first place	2012 San Salvador	1500 m
- Updated on May 4, 2018

Andrés Gabriel Arroyo Dominicci (born June 7, 1995) is a Puerto Rican middle-distance track athlete who specializes in various events. He competed for Puerto Rico at the Central American and Caribbean Junior Championships in Athletics in 2012 and 2014. He also appeared at the 2013 IAAF World Cross Country Championships, where he ran the junior men's race.

== High school ==
Arroyo attended Colonial High School in Orlando, Florida. Before high school, he had aspired to become a baseball player, and in an attempt to improve his speed for baseball, he was rejected by his middle-school's track team. He and his family moved to the continental United States in 2004. A spell of two races in March–April 2013 garnered national attention for Arroyo, who ran 4:04.45 in a 1600-meter race and a 1:47.79 800 meter run at the 2013 Florida Relays. He was only one of six individuals in US high school history to run under 1:48 in the 800 meters.

== Collegiate ==
Arroyo was recruited by University of Florida. He made his debut for the Gators track team on January 11, 2014, running 4:14.61 mile at that year's UAB Invitational in Birmingham, Alabama.

Arroyo qualified for 2016 Summer Olympics running 1:45.78 in 800 metres at 2016 Florida Relays.

Year	SEC cross country	NCAA Cross Country	SEC Indoor	NCAA Indoor	SEC Outdoor	NCAA Outdoor
2013-14	-	-	Distance Medley 9:41.66 2nd 800 m 1:50.45 2nd	800 m 1:51.17 10th	800 m 1:51.05 16th	800 m 1:51.02 21st
2014-15	-	-	800 m 1:48.48 2nd	800 m 1:49.18 11th	800 m 1:46.49 3rd	800 m 1:50.67 8th
2015-16	-	-	Distance Medley 9:50.07 7th 800 m 1:46.20 2nd	800 m 1:50.66 15th	800 m 1:48.20 8th	800 m 1:48.61 27th
