= Henri Delauze =

Bahamian sprinter

Personal information
- Born: May 6, 1997 (age 29)
Medal record
Athletics
Representing Bahamas
CAC Junior Championships (Under 18)
Silver medal – second place	2014 Morelia	400 m
Silver medal – second place	2014 Morelia	4×400 m relay
CARIFTA Games Junior (U20)
Silver medal – second place	2015 Basseterre	4x400 m relay
Bronze medal – third place	2015 Basseterre	400 m
CARIFTA Games (U17)
Gold medal – first place	2013 Nassau	4 x 400 m relay
Silver medal – second place	2014 Fort-de-France	400 m
Silver medal – second place	2014 Fort-de-France	4 x 400 m relay

Henri Delauze (born May 6, 1997) is a male sprinter from Freeport, Bahamas who mainly competes in the 400m. He attended Bishop Michael Eldon School on Grand Bahama Island before going on to compete for Miami Hurricanes and Embry-Riddle University.

Delauze has won multiple CARIFTA Games medals.

== Personal bests ==
Event	Time (seconds)	Venue	Date
200m	21.33	Coral Gables, Florida	25 MAR 2017
400m	46.43	Tallahassee, Florida	15 MAY 2016
600m	1:21.70	Daytona Beach, Florida	19 JAN 2019
