= Shaquania Dorsett =

Bahamian sprinter (born 1997)

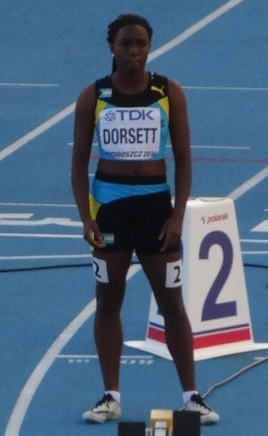
- Shaquania Dorsett in 2016

Personal information
- Nationality: Bahamian
- Born: 16 September 1997 (age 28)

Sport
- Sport: Sprinting
- Event: 4 × 400 metres
Medal record
Men's athletics
Representing Bahamas
CARIFTA Games (Junior)
Gold medal – first place	2015 Basseterre	400 m
Gold medal – first place	2015 Basseterre	800 m
Silver medal – second place	2014 Fort-de-France	4×400 m relay
Silver medal – second place	2016 St. George's	400m
Silver medal – second place	2016 St. George's	4×400 m relay

Shaquania Dorsett (born 16 September 1997) is a Bahamian sprinter. She competed in the women's 4 × 400 metres relay at the 2017 World Championships in Athletics. In 2014, she competed in the girls' 400 metres event at the 2014 Summer Youth Olympics held in Nanjing, China.
