= 2013 CARIFTA Games =

XLII CARIFTA Games
- Dates: March 29-April 1
- Host city: Nassau, Bahamas (The Bahamas)
- Venue: Robinson National Stadium
- Level: Junior and Youth
- Events: 68: 16 junior boys + 1 exhibition + 1 open; 15 junior boys + 2 exhibition (incl. 1 open); 15 youth boys + 1 exhibition; 15 youth girls; 2 special olympics
- Participation: 423 athletes from 25 nations
- Records set: 7 CR

The 2013 CARIFTA Games took place between March 30-April 1, 2013. The event was held at the Thomas Robinson Stadium in Nassau, Bahamas. A report of the event was given for the IAAF. The games mark the seventh time in which the event was held in The Bahamas. The other years being 1976, 1978, 1981, 1984, 1992 and 2002.

== Bidding Process ==
Bidding took place during the 2012 CARIFTA Games held in Bermuda. Initially four countries, namely the Bahamas, Barbados, the Cayman Islands and Martinique, had shown some interest in hosting the games. But ultimately Martinique withdrew its bid in favour of the Bahamas, and Barbados did not come forward with an official bid. The Bahamas was eventually chosen over the Cayman Islands to host the event. This was attributed to a myriad of reasons such as the newly constructed Thomas Robinson Stadium, the Bahamas's fortieth independence celebrations in 2013, and the fact that the country hadn't hosted the event in ten years.

== Venue ==
The 2013 Games will be staged in the 15,000 seater, thirty million dollar Thomas A. Robinson National Stadium. Fifty million dollars are being spent to beautify the area and upgrade utilities around the stadium, which is the Queen Elizabeth Sports Centre, in time for both the CARIFTA games and the IAAF World Relays.

== Austin Sealy Award ==
The Austin Sealy Trophy for the most outstanding athlete of the games was awarded to Shaunae Miller, Bahamas. She won three gold medals (200 m, 400 m, and 4 × 100 metres relay) in the junior (U-20) category setting a new 200m games record in 22.77s.

== Records ==
A total of 7 new championship records (CR) were set.

Event	Record	Athlete	Country	Type
Boys Under 20 (Junior)
4 × 400 metres relay	3:05.68	Lennox Williams; Omar McLeod; Jevaughn Minzie; Jovan Francis	Jamaica	CR
Girls Under 20 (Junior)
200 m	22.77s (wind: +1.7 m/s)	Shaunae Miller	Bahamas	CR
High jump	1.87m	Jeanelle Scheper	Saint Lucia	CR
Boys Under 17 (Youth)
Triple jump	15.19m (wind: -0.6 m/s)	Miguel Van Assen	Suriname	CR
Javelin throw (700g)	64.01m	Anderson Peters	Grenada	CR
Girls Under 17 (Youth)
Shot put (3 kg)	14.48m	Chelsea James	Trinidad and Tobago	CR
Javelin throw (500g)	43.89m	Shanee Angol	Dominica	CR

Key

AR — Area record • CR — Championship record • NR — National record

== Medal summary ==
Medal winners were published for boys and for girls.

=== Boys under 20 (Junior) ===
Event	Gold		Silver		Bronze	
100 metres (wind: -0.4 m/s)	Zharnel Hughes; Anguilla	10.44	Jazeel Murphy; Jamaica	10.48	Tahir Walsh; Antigua and Barbuda	10.49
200 metres (wind: +3.4 m/s)	Teray Smith; Bahamas	20.58 w	Jevaughn Minzie; Jamaica	20.64 w	Jereem Richards; Trinidad and Tobago	20.69 w
400 metres	Machel Cedenio; Trinidad and Tobago	45.93	Javon Francis; Jamaica	46.00	Stephen Newbold; Bahamas	46.01
800 metres	Mark London; Trinidad and Tobago	1:51.34	Andre Colebrook; Bahamas	1:51.43	Marbeq Edgar; Saint Lucia	1:51.74
1500 metres	Mark London; Trinidad and Tobago	4:01.07	Marbeq Edgar; Saint Lucia	4:01.75	Chadoye Dawson; Jamaica	4:04.14
5000 metres	Akeem Marshall; Trinidad and Tobago	16:49.96	Clifton Betje; Suriname	16:55.00	Juma Mouchette; Bermuda	16:59.09
110 metres hurdles (wind: NWI)	Wilhem Belocian /Guadeloupe	13.49	Omar McLeod; Jamaica	13.57	Ruebin Walters; Trinidad and Tobago	13.66
400 metres hurdles	Omar McLeod; Jamaica	51.46	Kion Joseph; Barbados	51.94	Ruebin Walters; Trinidad and Tobago	52.31
4 × 100 metres relay	Jamaica; Jevaughn Minzie; Jazeel Murphy; Tyler Mason; Odail Todd	39.92	Trinidad and Tobago; Breon Munnings; Ayodelle Taffe; Jereem Richards; John Mark Constantine	40.36	Turks and Caicos Islands; Ifeanyi Otuonye; Angelo Garland; Junior Fils-Aime; Frzleyant Benjamin	44.11
4 × 400 metres relay	Jamaica; Lennox Williams; Omar McLeod; Jevaughn Minzie; Javon Francis	3:05.68 CR	Trinidad and Tobago; Asa Guevara; Jereem Richards; Theon Lewis; Machel Cedenio	3:06.23	Bahamas; James Williams; Janeko Cartwright; Stephen Newbold; Andre Colebrook	3:07.44
High jump	Christoff Bryan; Jamaica	2.14m	Laquan Nairn; Bahamas	2.11m	Demar Robinson; Jamaica	2.11m
Pole vault^{‡}	Xavier Boland; Jamaica	4.40m	Adrian Riley; Jamaica	3.00m		
Long jump	Laquan Nairn; Bahamas	7.40m (wind: +0.8 m/s)	Clive Pullen; Jamaica	7.38m w (wind: +2.3 m/s)	Kevin Philbert; Curaçao	7.36m (wind: +0.5 m/s)
Triple jump	Clive Pullen; Jamaica	15.44m (wind: +1.5 m/s)	Charles Greaves; Barbados	15.26m (wind: -1.7 m/s)	Akeel Edwards; Trinidad and Tobago	14.99m (wind: -1.4 m/s)
Shot put	Hezekiel Romeo; Trinidad and Tobago	18.66m	Chadrick Dacosta; Jamaica	18.42m	Eldred Henry; British Virgin Islands	18.01m
Discus throw	Fredrick Dacres; Jamaica	61.27m	Chadrick Dacosta; Jamaica	55.61m	Eldred Henry; British Virgin Islands	52.06m
Javelin throw	Alexander Pascal; Cayman Islands	67.50m	Janeil Craig; Barbados	63.36m	Adrian Williams; Saint Kitts and Nevis	63.22m
Heptathlon^{†}	Desmond Major; Bahamas	4707	Adrian Riley; Jamaica	4665	Charles Sealy; Bahamas	4611

^{†}: Open event for both junior and youth athletes.
^{‡}: Exhibition event (no medals).

=== Girls under 20 (Junior) ===
Event	Gold		Silver		Bronze	
100 metres (wind: -0.8 m/s)	Devynne Charlton; Bahamas	11.60	Carmiesha Cox; Bahamas	11.61	Monique Spencer; Jamaica	11.64
200 metres (wind: +1.7 m/s)	Shaunae Miller; Bahamas	22.77 CR	Shericka Jackson; Jamaica	22.84	Carmiesha Cox; Bahamas	23.66
400 metres	Shaunae Miller; Bahamas	51.63	Chris-Ann Gordon; Jamaica	53.22	Kadecia Baird; Guyana	54.28
800 metres	Simoya Campbell; Jamaica	2:06.22	Sonia Gaskin; Barbados	2:06.84	Titania Markland; Jamaica	2:09.74
1500 metres	Jevina Straker; Guyana	4:43.27	Vanessa Philbert; Curaçao	4:47.97	Lisa Buchanan; Jamaica	4:52.21
3000 metres^{†‡}	Shanieke Watson; Jamaica	10:56.07	Derica Pitters; Jamaica	11:05.58	Zakiyyah Showers; Bermuda	11:30.06
100 metres hurdles (wind: -3.2 m/s)	Megan Simmonds; Jamaica	13.89	Akela Jones; Barbados	14.10	Devynne Charlton; Bahamas	14.25
400 metres hurdles	Kimone Green; Jamaica	59.31	Tatiana Wolfe; Jamaica	1:00.65	Tia-Adana Belle; Barbados	1:01.36
4 × 100 metres relay	Bahamas; Devynne Charlton; Carmiesha Cox; Shaunae Miller; Keianna Albury	44.77	Barbados; Shakera Hall; Akela Jones; Ariel Jackson; Shavonne Husbands	45.67	Trinidad and Tobago; Aaliyah Telesford; Lisa Wickham; Alzola Peli; Kayelle Clarke	45.71
4 × 400 metres relay	Jamaica; Yanique McNeil; Simoya Campbell; Shericka Jackson; Chris-Ann Gordon	3:34.36	Barbados; Tia-Adana Belle; Sonia Gaskin; Shavonne Husbands; Ariel Jackson	3:41.89	Bahamas; Juanae Lewis; Kadeisha Hield; Pedrya Seymour; Racheal Brown	3:45.95
High jump	Jeanelle Scheper; Saint Lucia	1.87m CR	Akela Jones; Barbados	1.80m	Thea LaFond; Dominica	1.80m
Long jump	Akela Jones; Barbados	6.19m (wind: +0.9 m/s)	Tamara Moncrieffe; Jamaica	6.01m (wind: +1.2 m/s)	Claudette Allen; Jamaica	5.97m (wind: -0.7 m/s)
Triple jump	Shardia Lawrence; Jamaica	12.99m (wind: +0.6 m/s)	Tamara Moncrieffe; Jamaica	12.95m (wind: +1.8 m/s)	Thea LaFond; Dominica	12.68m (wind: +1.5 m/s)
Shot put	Christine Gavarin /Guadeloupe	13.04m	Gleneve Grange; Jamaica	13.02m	Trevia Gumbs; British Virgin Islands	12.59m
Discus throw	Gleneve Grange; Jamaica	47.95m	Rochelle Frazer; Jamaica	42.33m	Shaunna Downey; Trinidad and Tobago	41.95m
Javelin throw	Sandrine Mezin /Martinique	43.97m	Tynelle Gumbs; British Virgin Islands	35.74m	Charissa Douglas; Suriname	35.67m
Pentathlon^{†}	Gleneve Grange; Jamaica	3628	Miquel Roach; Bahamas	3318	Chelsey Linton; Dominica	3151

^{†}: Open event for both junior and youth athletes.
^{‡}: Exhibition event (no medals).

=== Boys under 17 (Youth) ===
Event	Gold		Silver		Bronze	
100 metres (wind: +0.5 m/s)	Mario Burke; Barbados	10.61	Keanu Pennerman; Bahamas	10.85	Jelani Walker; Jamaica	10.93
200 metres (wind: +2.2 m/s)	Martin Manley; Jamaica	21.35 w	Mario Burke; Barbados	21.42 w	Jaheel Hyde; Jamaica	21.45 w
400 metres	Martin Manley; Jamaica	47.72	Kinard Rolle; Bahamas	48.05	Jason Yaw; Guyana	48.53
800 metres	Shevon Parks; Jamaica	1:58.62	Akeem Marshall; Barbados	1:58.77	Rayon Butler; Jamaica	1:59.61
1500 metres	Jauavney James; Jamaica	4:06.63	Shevon Parks; Jamaica	4:07.50	Benjamin Najman; Bahamas	4:17.52
3000 metres	Jauavney James; Jamaica	9:26.45	Alvin Nardin /Guadeloupe	9:27.32	Alexander Haleem; Trinidad and Tobago	9:49.59
110 metres hurdles^{‡} (wind: -2.3 m/s)	Jaheel Hyde; Jamaica	13.86	Roje Jackson-Chin; Jamaica	14.14	Michael Nicholls; Barbados	15.04
400 metres hurdles	Rivaldo Leacock; Barbados	53.11	Orlando Smith; Jamaica	56.89	Mikhail Bethel; Bahamas	58.06
4 × 100 metres relay	Jamaica; Roje Jackson-Chin; Jelani Walker; Jaheel Hyde; Raheem Chambers	41.38	Barbados; Rivaldo Leacock; Mario Burke; Michael Nicholls; Ramarco Thompson	41.87	Bahamas; Shalom Cash; Keanu Pennerman; Javan Martin; Scharann Cash	41.89
4 × 400 metres relay	Bahamas; Henri Delauze; Tyler Bowe; Kinard Rolle; Mikhail Bethel	3:16.12	Barbados; Rivaldo Leacock; Ramarco Thompson; Akeem Marshall; Mario Burke	3:16.38	Jamaica; Martin Manley; Jaheel Hyde; Caniggia Harriott; Jauavney James	3:16.47
High jump	Miguel Van Assen; Suriname	2.03m	Ken Mullings; Bahamas	2.03m	Obrien Wasome; Jamaica	1.95m
Long jump	Andwuelle Wright; Trinidad and Tobago	7.29m (wind: NWI)	Ajani James; Jamaica	7.20m w (wind: +3.2 m/s)	Che Richards; Trinidad and Tobago	7.01m w (wind: +4.2 m/s)
Triple jump	Miguel Van Assen; Suriname	15.19m (wind: -0.6 m/s) CR	Dean Pika; Suriname	14.59m (wind: -0.5 m/s)	Obrien Wasome; Jamaica	14.38m w (wind: +2.7 m/s)
Shot put	Warren Barrett; Jamaica	16.88m	Vashon McCarthy; Jamaica	16.47m	Anderson Peters; Grenada	15.53m
Discus throw	Vashon McCarthy; Jamaica	48.37m	Sanjae Lawrence; Jamaica	48.26m	Mathieu Badof /Guadeloupe	41.51m
Javelin throw	Anderson Peters; Grenada	64.01m CR	Travis Ferguson; Bahamas	58.76m	Mickel Joseph; Grenada	57.24m

^{‡}: Exhibition event (no medals).

=== Girls under 17 (Youth) ===
Event	Gold		Silver		Bronze	
100 metres (wind: +0.6 m/s)	Natalliah Whyte; Jamaica	11.88	Nelda Huggins; British Virgin Islands	11.94	Shellece Clarke; Jamaica	12.00
200 metres (wind: +2.1 m/s)	Natalliah Whyte; Jamaica	23.65 w	Jenae Ambrose; Bahamas	24.04 w	Tirana Mitchell; Guyana	24.05 w
400 metres	Tiffany James; Jamaica	55.13	Tarika Moses; British Virgin Islands	55.83	Doneisha Anderson; Bahamas	56.36
800 metres	Faheemah Kyrah Scraders; Bermuda	2:11.62	Cassey George; Guyana	2:12.64	Lakeisha Warner; British Virgin Islands	2:12.71
1500 metres	Cassey George; Guyana	4:36.67	Faheemah Kyrah Scraders; Bermuda	4:39.43	Britnie Dixon; Jamaica	4:47.45
100 metres hurdles (wind: -3.3 m/s)	Rushelle Burton; Jamaica	13.96	Janeek Brown; Jamaica	14.30	Jemenise Parris; Trinidad and Tobago	14.64
300 metres hurdles	Jemenise Parris; Trinidad and Tobago	43.24	Patrice Moody; Jamaica	43.73	Tristan Evelyn; Barbados	44.84
4 × 100 metres relay	Jamaica; Janeek Brown; Natalliah Whyte; Safiyah Thompson; Rushelle Burton	45.62	Barbados; Jalisa Burrowes; Timeka Jordan; Tiana Bowen; Tristan Evelyn	46.56	Bahamas; Blayre Catalyn; Jenae Ambrose; Brianne Bethel; Doneisha Anderson	46.58
4 × 400 metres relay	Jamaica; Shannon Kalawan; Tiffany James; Patrice Moody; Asshanni Robb	3:44.13	British Virgin Islands; Lakeisha Warner; Tarika Moses; Nelda Huggins; Judine Lacey	3:48.76	Bahamas; Shaquana Dorsette; Dreshanne Rolle; Doneisha Anderson; Brianne Bethel	3:49.38
High jump	Britny Kerr; Jamaica	1.68m	Sakari Famous; Bermuda	1.65m	Shiann Salmon; Jamaica	1.60m
Long jump	Jalisa Burrowes; Barbados	5.77m (wind: NWI)	Andira Ferguson; Bahamas	5.75m (wind: +1.7 m/s)	Kristal Liburd; Saint Kitts and Nevis	5.74m w (wind: +2.5 m/s)
Triple jump	Yanis David /Guadeloupe	12.52m w (wind: +3.6 m/s)	Britny Kerr; Jamaica	12.43m w (wind: +2.9 m/s)	Fidella Boorie; Suriname	11.98m w (wind: +6.1 m/s)
Shot put	Chelsea James; Trinidad and Tobago	14.48m CR	Janell Fullerton; Jamaica	13.75m	Brashae Wood; Bahamas	12.60m
Discus throw	Shanice Love; Jamaica	40.16m	Janell Fullerton; Jamaica	39.91m	Shaiann Charles; Trinidad and Tobago	39.19m
Javelin throw	Shanee Angol; Dominica	43.89m CR	Hayley Matthews; Barbados	40.30m	Daneliz Thomas; Cayman Islands	37.99m

=== Special Olympics – Boys ===
Event	Gold		Silver		Bronze	
100 metres^{‡} wind: 0.8 m/s	D'Edwin Major	12.16	Deron Forbes	12.24	Shaquille Bonaby	12.32

^{‡}: Exhibition event (no medals).

=== Special Olympics – Girls ===
Event	Gold		Silver		Bronze	
100 metres^{‡} wind: +1.1 m/s	Jade Smith	15.50	Raquel Major	16.09	Charlicia Bain	16.19

^{‡}: Exhibition event (no medals).

== Medal table (official) ==
The official count is in accordance with the medal count published by Carifta 2013's Local Organizing Committee.

* Host nation (Bahamas)

Rank	Nation	Gold	Silver	Bronze	Total
1	Jamaica	29	25	15	69
2	Bahamas*	8	10	13	31
3	Trinidad and Tobago	8	2	10	20
4	Barbados	4	14	2	20
5	/Guadeloupe	3	1	1	5
6	Suriname	2	2	2	6
7	Guyana	2	1	3	6
8	Bermuda	1	2	1	4
9	Saint Lucia	1	1	1	3
10	Dominica	1	0	3	4
11	Grenada	1	0	2	3
12	Cayman Islands	1	0	1	2
13	Anguilla	1	0	0	1
13	/Martinique	1	0	0	1
15	British Virgin Islands	0	4	4	8
16	Curaçao	0	1	1	2
17	Saint Kitts and Nevis	0	0	2	2
18	Antigua and Barbuda	0	0	1	1
18	Turks and Caicos Islands	0	0	1	1
Totals (19 entries)		63	63	63	189

== Participation ==
According to an unofficial count (without relays and special olympics), 423 athletes from 25 countries participated.

- Anguilla (5)
- Antigua and Barbuda (5)
- Aruba (3)
- Bahamas (59)
- Barbados (28)
- Bermuda (23)
- British Virgin Islands (22)
- Cayman Islands (12)
- Curaçao (7)
- Dominica (10)
- /French Guiana (3)
- Grenada (13)
- /Guadeloupe (17)
- Guyana (8)
- (Haiti) Haïti (12)
- Jamaica (69)
- /Martinique (9)
- Saint Kitts and Nevis (9)
- Saint Lucia (6)
- Saint Vincent and the Grenadines (4)
- Sint Maarten (5)
- Suriname (12)
- Trinidad and Tobago (40)
- Turks and Caicos Islands (24)
- U.S. Virgin Islands (18)
