= Alondra Negrón =

Puerto Rican steeplechase runner

Alondra Y. Negrón Texidor
Personal information
- Born: May 31, 1998 (age 28) Aibonito, Puerto Rico
- Home town: Aibonito, Puerto Rico
- Education: Ana G. Méndez University 2022; M.B.A. Finance University of New Mexico 2020; BBA, Universidad del Turabo, 2017
- Height: 172 cm (5 ft 8 in)
- Weight: 115.4 lb (52 kg)

Sport
- Sport: Athletics
- Event(s): 3000 meters steeplechase 1500 meters 5000 meters
- College team: New Mexico Lobos
- Turned pro: 2020
Medal record
Women's athletics
Representing Puerto Rico
Ibero-American Championships
Bronze medal – third place	2024 Cuiabá	3,000 m Steeplechase
Central American and Caribbean Games
Gold medal – first place	2023 San Salvador	3000 m Steeplechase
NACAC Championships
Bronze medal – third place	2025 Freeport	3000m steeplechase
	2022 Freeport	3000 m steeplechase
Ibero-American Championships
	2022 La Nucía	1500 m
Central American and Caribbean Games
	2018 Barranquilla	3000 m Steeplechase
World Athletics U20 Championships
	2016 Bydgoszcz	1500 m
Pan American U20 Athletics Championships
Silver medal – second place	2017 Trujillo	3000 m Steeplechase
IAAF World Youth Championships in Athletics
	2015 Cali	2000 m steeplechase
Youth Olympic Games
	2014 Nanjing	2000 m steeplechase
CAC U-18 Championships
Gold medal – first place	2014 Morelia	3000 m
Gold medal – first place	2014 Morelia	2000 m steeplechase
Representing New Mexico Lobos/ Mountain West Conference
NCAA Cross Country Championships
Gold medal – first place	2017 Louisville	Team Gold

Alondra Negron (born May 31, 1998) is a Puerto Rican middle-distance runner who specializes in the 3000 meter steeplechase.

== NCAA record ==
Year	Competition	Venue	Position	Event	Notes
Representing New Mexico Lobos
2018	2018 NCAA Division I Outdoor Track and Field Championships	California State University, Sacramento	40th	3000 m Steeplechase	10:15.77
2018	Mountain West Conference Outdoor Track & Field Championships	California State University, Fresno	13th	3000 m Steeplechase	11:12.48
2018	2018 NCAA Division I Indoor Track and Field Championships	Texas A&M University	10th	DMR	11:13.21
2018	Mountain West Conference Indoor Track & Field Championships	University of New Mexico	38th	3000 m	DNF
2018	Mountain West Conference Indoor Track & Field Championships	University of New Mexico	8th	Mile	4:54.31
2018	Mountain West Conference Indoor Track & Field Championships	University of New Mexico	2nd	DMR	11:07.88
2017	2017 NCAA Division I Cross Country Championships	University of Louisville	85th	6 km	20:36.7
2017	Mountain West Conference Cross Country Championships	University of New Mexico	20th	6 km	21:35.6
