= Anderson Peters =

Grenadian javelin thrower

Anderson Peters MBE
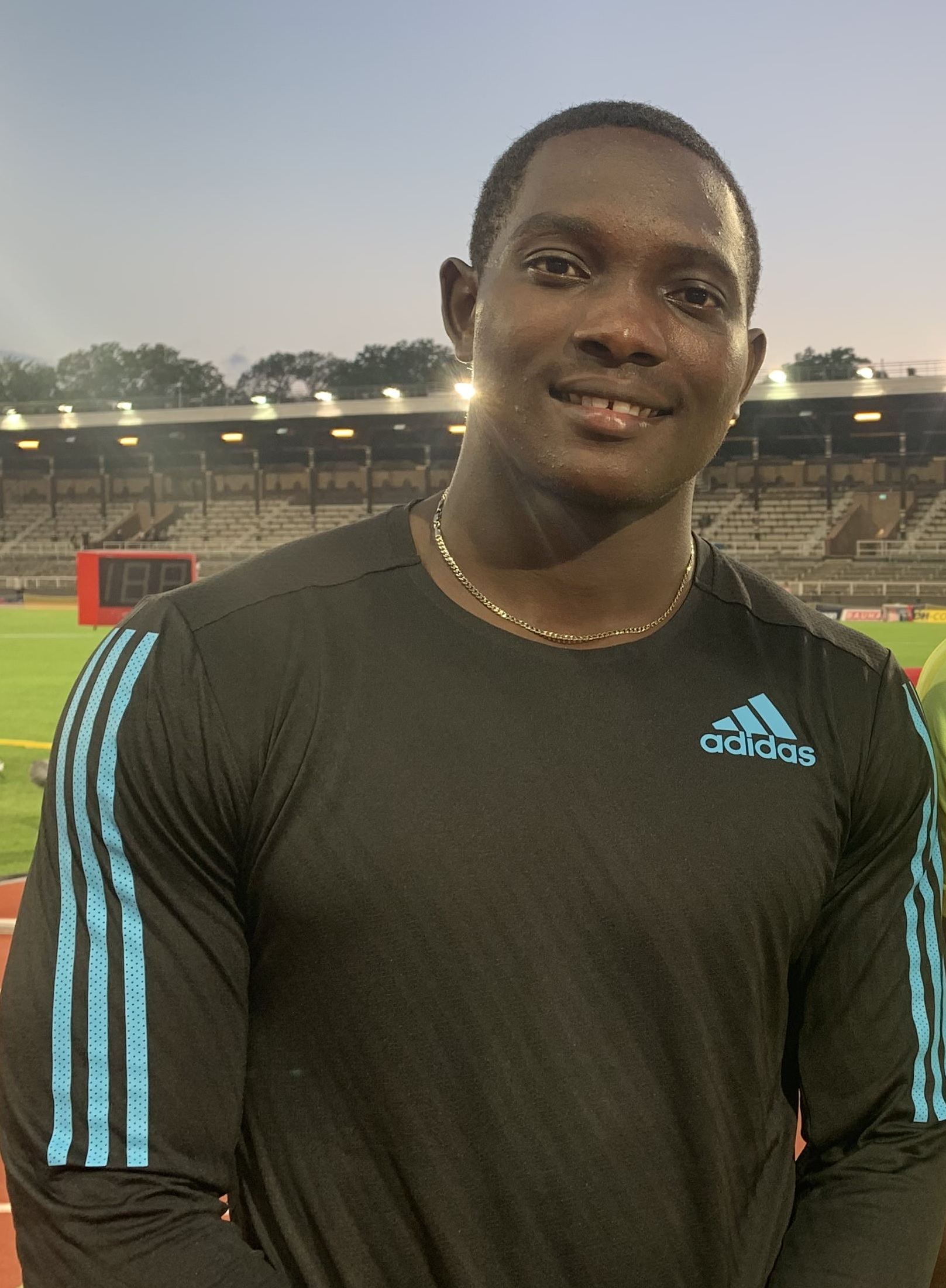
- Peters in 2022

Personal information
- Nationality: Grenadian
- Born: 21 October 1997 (age 29) Saint Andrew, Grenada

Sport
- Country: Grenada
- Sport: Track and field
- Event: Javelin throw
- College team: Mississippi State Bulldogs
- Club: St. David's Track Blazers

Achievements and titles
- Highest world ranking: 1
- Personal bests: 93.07 m (2022) AR, CR
Medal record
Men's athletics
Representing Grenada
Olympic Games
Bronze medal – third place	2024 Paris	Javelin throw
World Championships
Gold medal – first place	2019 Doha	Javelin throw
Gold medal – first place	2022 Eugene	Javelin throw
Silver medal – second place	2025 Tokyo	Javelin throw
World Ultimate Championship
Second place	2026 Budapest	Javelin throw
Diamond League
First place	2024 Brussels	Javelin throw
Commonwealth Games
Silver medal – second place	2022 Birmingham	Javelin throw
Bronze medal – third place	2018 Gold Coast	Javelin throw
Pan American Games
Gold medal – first place	2019 Lima	Javelin throw
World U20 Championships
Bronze medal – third place	2016 Bydgoszcz	Javelin throw
CARIFTA Games
Gold medal – first place	2012 Hamilton	Javelin throw
Gold medal – first place	2013 Nassau	Javelin throw
Gold medal – first place	2014 Fort-de-France	Javelin throw
Gold medal – first place	2015 Basseterre	Javelin throw
Gold medal – first place	2016 St. George's	Javelin throw
Bronze medal – third place	2013 Nassau	Shot put
Central American and Caribbean Junior Champs
Gold medal – first place	2014 Mexico	Javelin throw
OECS Track and Field Championships
Silver medal – second place	2016 Tortola	Javelin throw
Gold medal – first place	2017 St.George's	Javelin throw

Anderson Peters MBE (born 21 October 1997) is a Grenadian javelin thrower and the 2019 and 2022 world champion in the event. In 2024, he won the bronze medal in the men's javelin throw at the Paris Olympic Games. He is a multiple time CARIFTA Games champion at the discipline and in 2016 earned a bronze medal at the 2016 IAAF World U20 Championships in Bydgoszcz, Poland, setting a new Grenadian national record and OECS record at the same time.

== Career ==
He gave the performance of the championships at the 2016 CARIFTA Games, a meet record of 78.28 m (256 ft 9 in), and was awarded the Austin Sealy Trophy. In January 2017, it was announced that Anderson was given a full scholarship to Mississippi State University. He started his season with a throw of 75.29m at the 2017 Bulldog Relays.

At the 2017 edition of the Whitsuntide games at the Kirani James Athletic Stadium, Anderson improved his personal best distance in the Javelin Throw three times. With his final throw we achieved a distance of 81.23 Meters. On 25 June 2017, he was able to further improve on his personal best and National Record with a throw of 83.36m at the Trinidad and Tobago NGC/SAGICOR/NAAA National Open Championships. This throw allowed him to achieve the qualifying standard for the 2017 World Championships in Athletics. At the 3rd OECS Track And Field Championships held at the Kirani James Athletic Stadium, Anderson further lifted his personal best with a throw of 84.81m. Anderson went on to attend the 2017 World Championships in Athletics in London but was unable to advance beyond the qualifying round with a best effort of 78.99m.

On 23 March, during his second outdoor competition of 2018, Peters registered an 81.95m throw shattering Mississippi State's freshman record in the javelin by more than six meters. The throw moved him to the top of the NCAA leader board and a 4th place World Ranking. He was subsequently named the USTFCCCA NCAA Division I Men's National Athlete of the Week. He also earned Freshman of the Week honors from the Southeastern Conference. He went on to become the Southeastern Conference champion in his event with a throw of 82.04m, a new meet record. On 29 May he was named the SEC Field freshman of the year. After winning the Javelin competition NCAA championship with a new record of 82.82, he was given "All American" honors

In August 2019, Peters won gold at the Pan American Games in the process setting a games record and national record. Peters also won Grenada's first ever Pan American Games gold medal.

At the World Athletics Championships 2022, Peters successfully defended his world title, beating the Olympic gold medalist Neeraj Chopra with three throws over 90 m. He won a silver medal for Grenada at the 2022 Commonwealth Games with a throw of 88.64 m.

On 13 August 2022, Anderson got severely injured after being beaten by five crew members of a party boat.

Peters was appointed Member of the Order of the British Empire (MBE) in the 2022 Birthday Honours for services to sports.

Still recovering from his injury, he failed to make it into the final round of World Athletics Championships 2023 with a throw of 78.49 m in the qualification round.

Following his medal-winning performance at the Paris Olympic Games, Peters delivered a remarkable 90m throw at the Diamond League meet in Lausanne on August 23, 2024, securing the top position ahead of Olympic silver medalist Neeraj Chopra. Peters' throw of 90.61m also set a new meet record.

== Performance record ==
=== Tournaments ===
Year	Competition	Venue	Position	Event	Notes
Representing Grenada
2012	CARIFTA Games	Hamilton, Bermuda	1st	Javelin Throw (700g) (U17)	60.50 m
2013	CARIFTA Games	Nassau, Bahamas	1st	Javelin Throw (700g) (U17)	64.01 m CR
2013	CARIFTA Games	Nassau, Bahamas	3rd	Shot put (U17)	15.53 m
2013	World Youth Championships	Donetsk, Ukraine	8th	Javelin Throw	70.53 m
2013	Pan American Junior Championships	Medellín, Colombia	9th	Javelin Throw (800g)	61.44 m
2014	CARIFTA Games	Fort-de-France, Martinique	1st	Javelin Throw (700g) (U18)	67.67 m CR
2014	Central American and Caribbean Junior Championships	Morelia, Mexico	1st	Javelin Throw	72.39 m CR
2015	CARIFTA Games	Basseterre, Saint Kitts and Nevis	1st	Javelin Throw (800g)(U20)	70.09 m
2015	Pan American Junior Championships	Edmonton, Canada	2nd	Javelin Throw	72.11 m
2016	CARIFTA Games	St. George's, Grenada	1st	Javelin Throw (800g) (U20)	78.28 m CR NR
2016	OECS Track and Field Championships	Tortola, British Virgin Islands	2nd	Javelin Throw	76.78 m
2016	World U20 Championships	Bydgoszcz, Poland	3rd	Javelin Throw	79.65 m NR
2017	Trinidad & Tobago National Open Championships	Port of Spain, Trinidad and Tobago	1st	Javelin Throw (800g)	83.36 m NR
2017	OECS Track and Field Championships	St. George's, Grenada	1st	Javelin Throw	84.81 m NR
2017	2017 World Championships in Athletics	London, United Kingdom	20th	Javelin Throw	78.88 m
2018	Commonwealth Games	Gold Coast, Australia	3rd	Javelin Throw	82.20 m
2018	Central American and Caribbean Games	Barranquilla, Colombia	2nd	Javelin Throw	81.80 m
2018	2018 NACAC Championships	Toronto, Canada	1st	Javelin Throw	79.65 m CR
2019	2019 Pan American Games	Lima, Peru	1st	Javelin Throw	87.31 m GR, NR
2019	2019 World Championships in Athletics	Doha, Qatar	1st	Javelin Throw	86.89 m
2021	2020 Summer Olympic Games	Tokyo, Japan	15th	Javelin Throw	80.32 m
2022	Doha Diamond League	Doha, Qatar	1st	Javelin Throw	93.07 m NR
2022	Stockholm Diamond League	Stockholm, Sweden	1st	Javelin Throw	90.54 m
2022	World Athletics Championships	Eugene, United States	1st	Javelin Throw	90.54 m
2022	2022 Commonwealth Games	Birmingham, United Kingdom	2nd	Javelin Throw	88.64 m
2023	2023 World Athletics Championships	Budapest, Hungary	16th	Javelin Throw	78.49 m
2024	2024 Summer Olympics	Paris, France	3rd	Javelin Throw	88.54 m
2024	2024 Diamond League Final	Brussels, Belgium	1st	Javelin Throw	87.87 m
2025	2025 World Athletics Championships	Tokyo, Japan	2nd	Javelin Throw	87.38 m
2026	Commonwealth Games	Glasgow, United Kingdom	4th	Javelin throw	83.88 m
2026	Central American and Caribbean Games	Santo Domingo, Dominican Republic	1st	Javelin throw	83.95 m
2026	World Athletics Ultimate Championship	Budapest, Hungary	2nd	Javelin throw	86.18 m

=== Seasonal bests by year ===
Year	Date	Location	Performance	Notes
2013	24 August	Medellín, Colombia	61.44 m	
2015	28 June	Port of Spain, Trinidad and Tobago	74.20 m	
2016	23 July	Bydgoszcz, Poland	79.65 m	NR
2017	2 July	St. George's, Grenada	84.81 m	NR
2018	6 June	Eugene, United States	82.82 m	
2019	10 August	Lima, Peru	87.31 m	NR
2020	1 August	St. George's, Grenada	80.50 m	
2021	28 August	Paris, France	85.98 m	
2022	13 May	Doha, Qatar	93.07 m	NR AR
2023	5 May	Doha, Qatar	85.88 m	
2024	22 August	Lausanne, Switzerland	90.61 m	
2025	16 May	Tokyo, Japan	89.53 m	
2026	27 August	Zurich, Switzerland	86.93 m	

Source: World Athletics

== See also ==
- List of javelin throwers
