= Candesha Scott =

Grenadian javelin thrower (born 1997)

Personal information
- Nationality: Grenada
- Born: 13 January 1997 (age 29)

Sport
- Sport: Track and field
- Events: Javelin throw Triple Jump; Shot Put; Combined Events
- College team: Minnesota Golden Gophers

Achievements and titles
- Personal bests: Javelin throw 51.13 m (2016) NR; Shot Put (Indoor) 13.22m Triple Jump (Indoor) 11.04m Pentathlon 2830; Heptathlon 4412

Candesha Scott (born 13 January 1997) is a Grenadian javelin thrower. She became the National Record holder at the discipline at the 2016 Carifta Games with a throw of 51.13m. She Qualified to compete at the 2016 IAAF World U20 Championships in Bydgoszcz, Poland where she failed to qualify for the final of women's javelin. Scott finished 13th overall recording her best throw on the second attempt of her allotted three, throwing 47.86 meters. She has since gained admission into the Central Arizona College.

== Combined Event Personal bests ==
Event	Result	Venue	Date
Outdoor
100 m hurdles	16.43	Phoenix, AZ	22 March 2018
High jump	1.49m	Phoenix, AZ	22 March 2018
Shot put	12.64m	Phoenix, AZ	22 March 2018
200 m	27.83	Phoenix, AZ	22 March 2018
Long jump	5.16m	Phoenix, AZ	23 March 2018
Javelin throw	49.92m	Phoenix, AZ	23 March 2018
800 m	3:03.88	Phoenix, AZ	23 March 2018
Heptathlon	4412 pts	(United States) Phoenix, AZ	23 March 2018
Indoor
60m hurdles	9.80 s	Lubbock, Texas	2 March 2018
High jump	1.44 m	Lubbock, Texas	2 March 2018
Shot put	13.15 m	Lubbock, Texas	2 March 2018
Long jump	4.88	Phoenix, AZ	26 January 2018
800 m	3:02.32 s	Mesa, AZ	9 February 2018
Pentathlon	2830 pts	(United States) Lubbock, Texas	2 March 2018

== Competition record ==
Year	Competition	Venue	Position	Event	Notes
Representing Grenada
2015	CARIFTA Games	Basseterre, Saint Kitts and Nevis	3rd	Javelin throw (U20)	45.58m
2016	HAMPTON INT'L GAMES	Port of Spain, Trinidad & Tobago	1st	Javelin throw	48.32m
2016	CARIFTA Games	St. George's, Grenada	1st	Javelin throw (U20)	51.13m CR' NR
2016	Grenada National Championships	St. George's, Grenada	1st	Javelin throw	47.85m
2016	OECS Track & Field Championships	Tortola, BVI	1st	Javelin throw (U20)	50.35m
2016	World U20 Championships	Bydgoszcz, Poland	28th	Javelin throw	47.86 m
2017	OECS Track And Field Championships	Kirani James Athletic Stadium, Grenada	5th	Shot Put	12.34m
2017	OECS Track And Field Championships	Kirani James Athletic Stadium, Grenada	1st	Javelin	50.12m

== See also ==
- List of javelin throwers
