= Doneisha Anderson =

Bahamian sprinter (born 2000)

Personal information
- Nationality: Bahamian
- Born: 21 September 2000 (age 25)

Sport
- Sport: Athletics
- Event: 400 metres
- University team: Florida Gators
Medal record
Men's athletics
Representing Bahamas
CARIFTA Games (Under 20)
Gold medal – first place	2018 Nassau	400 m
CARIFTA Games (Under 18)
Silver medal – second place	2014 Fort-de-France	4×400 m relay
Silver medal – second place	2015 Basseterre	High jump
Silver medal – second place	2015 Basseterre	4×400 m relay
Bronze medal – third place	2013 Nassau	400 m
Bronze medal – third place	2013 Nassau	4×400 m relay

Doneisha Anderson (born 21 September 2000) is a Bahamian athlete. She competed in the women's 4 × 400 metres relay event at the 2020 Summer Olympics. She competes at the collegiate level for the University of Florida.
