= Yanique Thompson =

Jamaican hurdler (born 1996)

Personal information
- Nationality: Jamaican
- Born: 12 March 1996 (age 30)

Sport
- Sport: Hurdling
- Event: 100 metres hurdles
Medal record
Commonwealth Games
Bronze medal – third place	2018 Gold Coast	100 m hurdles
IAAF World U18 Championships
Gold medal – first place	2013 Donetsk	100 m hurdles
Carifta Games Junior (U20)
Gold medal – first place	2015 Basse-Terre	100 m hurdles
Gold medal – first place	2015 Basse-Terre	4×100 m relay

Yanique Thompson (born 12 March 1996) is a Jamaican hurdler. She competed in the women's 100 metres hurdles at the 2017 World Championships in Athletics. In July 2021, she qualified to represent Jamaica at the 2020 Summer Olympics.
