= Jenae Ambrose =

Bahamian sprinter (born 1997)

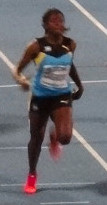

Personal information
- Nationality: Bahamian
- Born: 29 December 1997 (age 28)

Sport
- Sport: Sprinting
- Event: 4 × 100 metres
Medal record
Men's athletics
Representing Bahamas
Pan American U20 Championships
Bronze medal – third place	2015 Edmonton	4 × 100 m relay
CAC Junior Championships (Under 18)
Silver medal – second place	2014 Morelia	200 m
Silver medal – second place	2014 Morelia	4 × 100 m relay
Silver medal – second place	2014 Morelia	4 × 400 m relay
CARIFTA Games (Under 20)
Silver medal – second place	2015 Basseterre	4 × 100 m relay
Silver medal – second place	2016 St. George's	200 m
Silver medal – second place	2016 St. George's	4 × 100 m relay
Silver medal – second place	2016 St. George's	4 × 400 m relay
Bronze medal – third place	2015 Basseterre	100 m
CARIFTA Games (Under 18)
Silver medal – second place	2013 Nassau	200 m
Silver medal – second place	2014 Fort-de-France	100 m
Silver medal – second place	2014 Fort-de-France	4 × 100 m relay
Bronze medal – third place	2013 Nassau	4 × 100 m relay

Jenae Ambrose (born 29 December 1997) is a Bahamian sprinter. In 2014, she competed in the girls' 100 metres event at the 2014 Summer Youth Olympics held in Nanjing, China. She competed in the women's 4 × 100 metres relay at the 2017 World Championships in Athletics.
