= Keianna Albury =

Bahamian sprinter (born 1996)

Personal information
- Nationality: Bahamas
- Born: 28 July 1996 (age 29) The Bahamas

Sport
- Sport: Running
- Event(s): 100 metres, 200 metres,
Medal record
Women's athletics
Representing the Bahamas
Pan American U20 Championships
Bronze medal – third place	2015 Edmonton	4×100 m relay
CAC Junior Championships (Junior)
Gold medal – first place	2014 Morelia	200 m
Bronze medal – third place	2014 Morelia	100 m
Bronze medal – third place	2014 Morelia	4×100 m relay
CARIFTA Games (Junior)
Gold medal – first place	2013 Nassau	4×100 m relay
Silver medal – second place	2015 Basseterre	100 m
Silver medal – second place	2015 Basseterre	4×100 m relay
Bronze medal – third place	2014 Fort-de-France	4×100 m relay
Bronze medal – third place	2015 Basseterre	200 m
CARIFTA Games (Youth)
Silver medal – second place	2012 Hamilton	4×100 m relay

Keianna Albury (born 28 July 1996) is a Bahamian sprinter from Eleuthera Bahamas who attended St. Augustine's College in Nassau, Bahamas before going on to compete for Pennsylvania State University.
