= Brianne Bethel =

Bahamian sprinter

Personal information
- Nationality: Bahamian
- Born: 5 July 1998 (age 27) Freeport, Bahamas

Sport
- Country: Bahamas
- Sport: Track and field
- Event: Sprints
Medal record
Women's athletics
Representing Bahamas
CAC Junior Championships (Under 18)
Gold medal – first place	2014 Morelia	200 m
Silver medal – second place	2014 Morelia	4x100 m relay
Silver medal – second place	2014 Morelia	4×400 m relay
CARIFTA Games (Under 20)
Silver medal – second place	2016 St. George's	4×100 m relay
Silver medal – second place	2016 St. George's	4×400 m relay
Bronze medal – third place	2016 St. George's	100m
CARIFTA Games (Under 18)
Silver medal – second place	2014 Fort-de-France	4×100 m relay
Silver medal – second place	2014 Fort-de-France	4×400 m relay
Silver medal – second place	2015 Basseterre	200m
Silver medal – second place	2015 Basseterre	4×400 m relay
Bronze medal – third place	2013 Nassau	4×100 m relay
Bronze medal – third place	2013 Nassau	4×400 m relay
Bronze medal – third place	2015 Basseterre	100m

Brianne Natalia Bethel (born 5 July 1998) is a Bahamian sprinter.

A student at the University of Houston, Bethel secured her place at the delayed 2020 Tokyo Olympics when she ran two personal bests, including attaining an Olympic qualifying time, National Collegiate Athletic Association (NCAA) conference championships in May 2021 in Tampa, Florida. She clocked a personal best of 22.54 seconds in the 200m to become the eighth Bahamian to qualify for the Olympic Games and went on to compete in the Women's 4 × 400 metres relay event.

Her twin sister, Brittni, was a teammate of hers on the University of Houston track team.
