= Junelle Bromfield =

Jamaican sprinter (born 1998)

Junelle Lyles
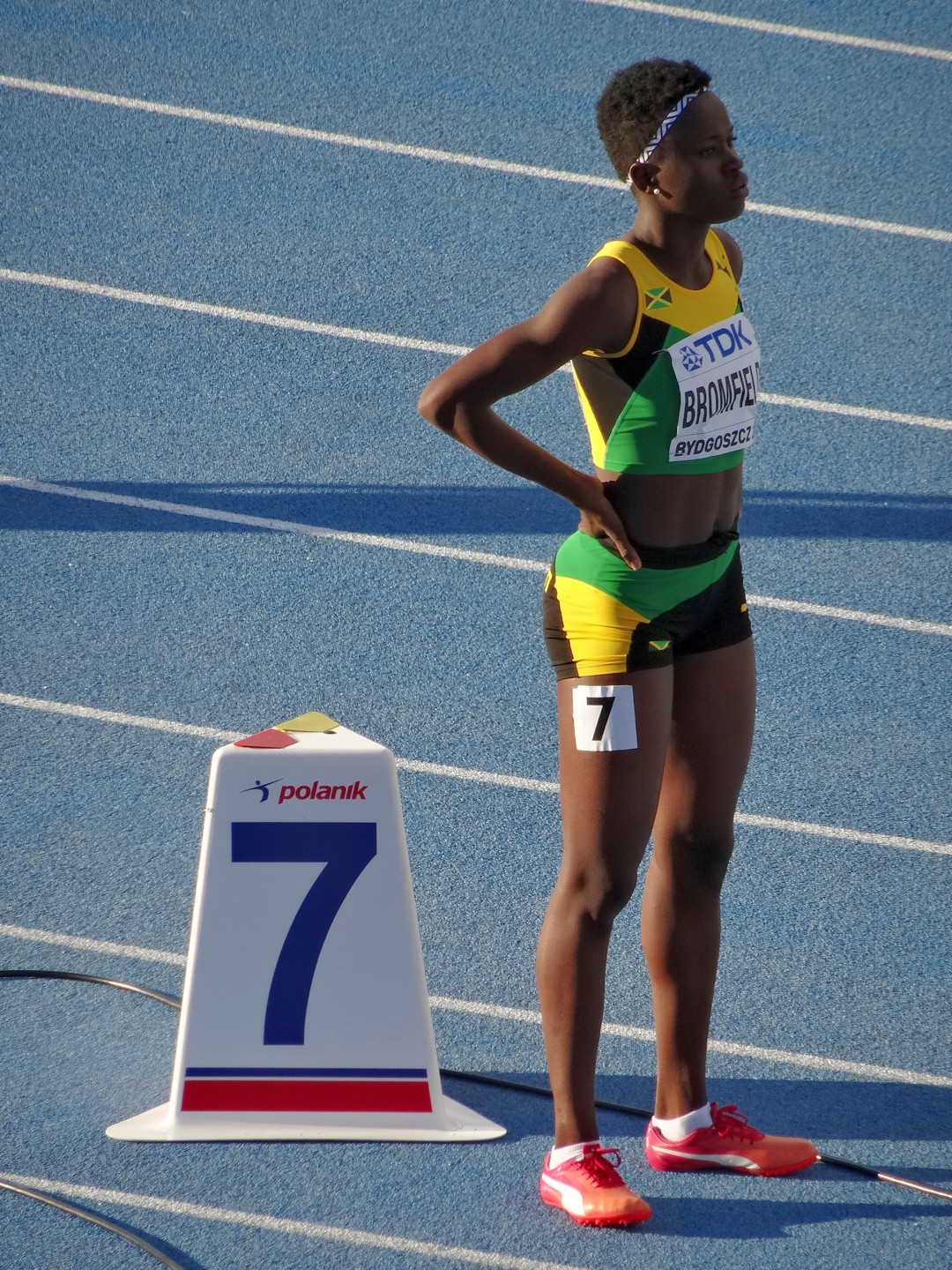
- Bromfield at the 2016 IAAF World U20 Championships

Personal information
- Born: 8 February 1998 (age 28) Black River, Jamaica

Sport
- Sport: Track and field
- Event: Sprint

Achievements and titles
- Personal bests: Outdoor 100m: 12.07 (2019); 200m: 23.19 (2022); 400m: 50.74 (2024); 400mH: 56.61 (2022); 800m: 2:06.21 (2016); 1500m: 4:40.77 (2016); Indoor 400m: 52.40 (2024)
Medal record
Women's athletics
Representing Jamaica
Olympic Games
Bronze medal – third place	2020 Tokyo	4 × 400 m relay
World Championships
Silver medal – second place	2022 Eugene	4 × 400 m relay
World Indoor Championships
Gold medal – first place	2022 Belgrade	4 × 400 m relay
Commonwealth Games
Silver medal – second place	2022 Birmingham	4 × 400 m relay
NACAC Championships
Silver medal – second place	2022 Freeport	Mixed 4 × 400 m relay
Silver medal – second place	2022 Freeport	4 × 400 m relay
Central American and Caribbean Games
Silver medal – second place	2018 Barranquilla	4 × 400 m relay
World U20 Championships
Silver medal – second place	2016 Bydgoszcz	4 × 400 m relay
Bronze medal – third place	2016 Bydgoszcz	400 m
Commonwealth Youth Games
Gold medal – first place	2015 Apia	400 m
Gold medal – first place	2015 Apia	400 m hurdles
Carifta Games Junior (U20)
Gold medal – first place	2017 Willemstad	400 m
Gold medal – first place	2017 Willemstad	4 × 400 m relay
Gold medal – first place	2016 St. George's	800 m
Gold medal – first place	2016 St. George's	4 × 400 m relay
Carifta Games Youth (U18)
Gold medal – first place	2015 Basse-Terre	400 m
Gold medal – first place	2015 Basse-Terre	400 m hurdles
Gold medal – first place	2015 Basse-Terre	4 × 400 m relay

Junelle Lyles (née Bromfield) (born 8 February 1998) is a Jamaican track and field athlete. She competed in the women's 4 × 400 metres relay event at the 2020 Summer Olympics, competing in the preliminary heat, and won a bronze medal.

== Personal life ==
Her husband is American sprinter Noah Lyles. In October 2024, Bromfield and Lyles got engaged.They were married on April 4, 2026.
