= Akanni Hislop =

Trinidad and Tobago sprinter

Personal information
- Nationality: Trinidad and Tobago
- Born: 1 June 1998 (age 28)

Sport
- Sport: Athletics
- Event: 100 metres
- College team: LSU Tigers
Medal record
Representing Trinidad and Tobago
Pan American Games
Silver medal – second place	2019 Lima	4x100 m relay

Akanni Hislop (born 1 June 1998) is a Trinidad and Tobago athlete. He competed in the men's 4 × 100 metres relay event at the 2020 Summer Olympics.
