= 2013 World Youth Championships in Athletics – Girls' 200 metres =

Girls' 200 metres at the 2013 World Youth Championships in Athletics
- Venue: RSC Olimpiyskiy
- Dates: 12 July (heats); 13 July (semifinal); 14 July (final)
- Competitors: 56
- Winning time: 22.92 CR

Medalists
gold medal	Irene Ekelund	Sweden
silver medal	Ángela Tenorio	Ecuador
bronze medal	Ariana Washington	United States

The girls' 200 metres at the 2013 World Youth Championships in Athletics was held on 12, 13 and 14 July.

== Medalists ==
Gold	Silver	Bronze
Irene Ekelund; Sweden	Ángela Tenorio; Ecuador	Ariana Washington; United States

== Records ==
Prior to the competition, the following records were as follows.

World Youth Best	Marion Jones (USA)	22.58	New Orleans, United States	22 June 1992
Championship Record	Aymée Martínez (CUB)	22.99	Marrakesh, Morocco	17 July 2005
World Youth Leading	Ariana Washington (USA)	23.18	Norwalk, United States	24 May 2013

== Heats ==
Qualification rule: first 3 of each heat (Q) next 3 fastest (q) qualified.

=== Heat 1 ===
Rank	Lane	Name	Nationality	Time	Notes
1	4	Hannah Cunliffe	United States	23.80	Q
2	8	Jonielle Smith	Jamaica	24.30	Q
3	7	Tobi Amusan	Nigeria	24.50	Q
4	6	Bryannill Cardona	Venezuela	24.69	SB
5	1	Laurence Jones	Luxembourg	24.92	PB
6	5	Õilme Võro	Estonia	25.19	PB
7	3	Tirana Mitchell	Guyana	25.69	
8	2	Vlatka Sekirnik	Croatia	26.06	

=== Heat 2 ===
Rank	Lane	Name	Nationality	Time	Notes
1	3	Ángela Tenorio	Ecuador	23.73	Q
2	8	Lisa Mayer	Germany	23.85	Q, PB
3	5	Anna Schena	Italy	24.61	Q, PB
4	6	Raquel Tjernagel	Canada	24.61	q
5	4	Jonel Lacey	British Virgin Islands	24.65	q, PB
6	7	Sofia Duarte	Portugal	25.32	
7	1	Taylor Sharpe	Canada	25.60	
8	2	Mzinde Ruvarashe	Zimbabwe	25.91	

=== Heat 3 ===
Rank	Lane	Name	Nationality	Time	Notes
1	6	Gina Lückenkemper	Germany	23.74	Q
2	7	Seika Aoyama	Japan	23.78	Q, PB
3	1	Kaja Debevec	Slovenia	24.78	Q, PB
4	5	Wang Xuan	China	24.79	
5	8	Loushanya Nemour	Bahamas	25.03	PB
6	2	Zouaouia Berhil	Algeria	25.30	
7	3	Liliya Manasipova	Uzbekistan	25.83	
	4	Drita Islami	North Macedonia	DQ	

=== Heat 4 ===
Rank	Lane	Name	Nationality	Time	Notes
1	8	Irene Ekelund	Sweden	23.02	Q, WYL
2	3	Letícia de Souza	Brazil	24.11	Q, PB
3	5	Deborah Adewumi Adewale	Nigeria	24.15	Q
4	4	Micaela Moroni	Italy	24.58	q, PB
5	7	Andrea Školová	Czech Republic	24.77	
6	2	Ivana Macanović	Bosnia and Herzegovina	25.09	PB
7	6	Ulfa Silpiana	Indonesia	25.09	PB
8	1	Lyubov Ushakova	Kazakhstan	25.59	

=== Heat 5 ===
Rank	Lane	Name	Nationality	Time	Notes
1	1	Shannon Hylton	Great Britain	23.58	Q
2	7	Nelda Huggins	British Virgin Islands	24.24	Q, PB
3	8	Noelia Martínez	Argentina	24.40	Q, PB
4	6	Ge Manqi	China	24.74	PB
5	3	Luan Gabriel	Dominica	24.90	
6	2	Joy Mphatho	Botswana	25.43	PB
7	5	Romana Kharchenko	Ukraine	25.62	PB
8	4	Cecilia Tamayo	Mexico	31.78	

=== Heat 6 ===
Rank	Lane	Name	Nationality	Time	Notes
1	4	Kayelle Clarke	Trinidad and Tobago	24.42	Q
2	8	Veronika Paličková	Czech Republic	24.43	Q, PB
3	5	Shanti Pereira	Singapore	24.54	Q, PB
4	7	Dutee Chand	India	24.68	PB
5	2	Mateja Jambrović	Croatia	24.68	PB
6	1	Katiuska Millán	Venezuela	25.32	
7	6	Tjaša Sirc	Slovenia	25.63	
	3	Fathin Mohd Yusuf	Malaysia	DNS	

=== Heat 7 ===
Rank	Lane	Name	Nationality	Time	Notes
1	6	Ariana Washington	United States	23.72	Q
2	2	Saqukine Cameron	Jamaica	24.35	Q
3	4	Jenae Ambrose	Bahamas	24.40	Q, PB
4	3	Simoné du Plooy	South Africa	24.98	
5	5	Astrid Balanta	Colombia	25.34	
6	1	Rumeshika Mudiyanselage	Sri Lanka	25.52	
7	8	Annelouise Jensen	Denmark	25.64	
	7	Basant Mohamed Awd A	Egypt	DNS	

== Semifinals ==
Qualification rule: first 2 of each heat (Q) plus the 2 fastest times (q) qualified.

=== Heat 1 ===
Rank	Lane	Name	Nationality	Time	Notes
1	4	Ariana Washington	United States	23.19	Q
2	6	Ángela Tenorio	Ecuador	23.35	Q
3	3	Lisa Mayer	Germany	23.75	q, PB
4	5	Letícia de Souza	Brazil	23.98	q, PB
5	8	Deborah Adewumi Adewale	Nigeria	24.06	PB
6	7	Noelia Martínez	Argentina	24.43	
7	2	Micaela Moroni	Italy	24.56	PB
8	1	Kaja Debevec	Slovenia	24.81	

=== Heat 2 ===
Rank	Lane	Name	Nationality	Time	Notes
1	3	Gina Lückenkemper	Germany	23.72	Q
2	5	Shannon Hylton	Great Britain	23.94	Q
3	4	Seika Aoyama	Japan	24.01	
4	7	Saqukine Cameron	Jamaica	24.34	
5	6	Nelda Huggins	British Virgin Islands	24.65	
6	8	Jenae Ambrose	Bahamas	25.05	
7	2	Anna Schena	Italy	25.07	
8	1	Raquel Tjernagel	Canada	25.36	

=== Heat 3 ===
Rank	Lane	Name	Nationality	Time	Notes
1	3	Irene Ekelund	Sweden	23.56	Q
2	6	Hannah Cunliffe	United States	23.63	Q
3	4	Jonielle Smith	Jamaica	24.13	
4	5	Kayelle Clarke	Trinidad and Tobago	24.54	
5	1	Shanti Pereira	Singapore	24.76	
6	7	Veronika Paličková	Czech Republic	25.08	
	8	Tobi Amusan	Nigeria	DQ	
	2	Jonel Lacey	British Virgin Islands	DNS	

== Final ==
Wind: –0,1

Rank	Lane	Name	Nationality	Time	Notes
1	4	Irene Ekelund	Sweden	22.92	CR, NJR, WYL
2	3	Ángela Tenorio	Ecuador	23.13	PB
3	5	Ariana Washington	United States	23.20	
4	8	Hannah Cunliffe	United States	23.44	PB
5	6	Gina Lückenkemper	Germany	23.53	
6	7	Shannon Hylton	United Kingdom	23.64	
7	2	Lisa Mayer	Germany	24.12	
8	1	Letícia de Souza	Brazil	24.46	
