= Jonielle Smith =

Jamaican sprinter

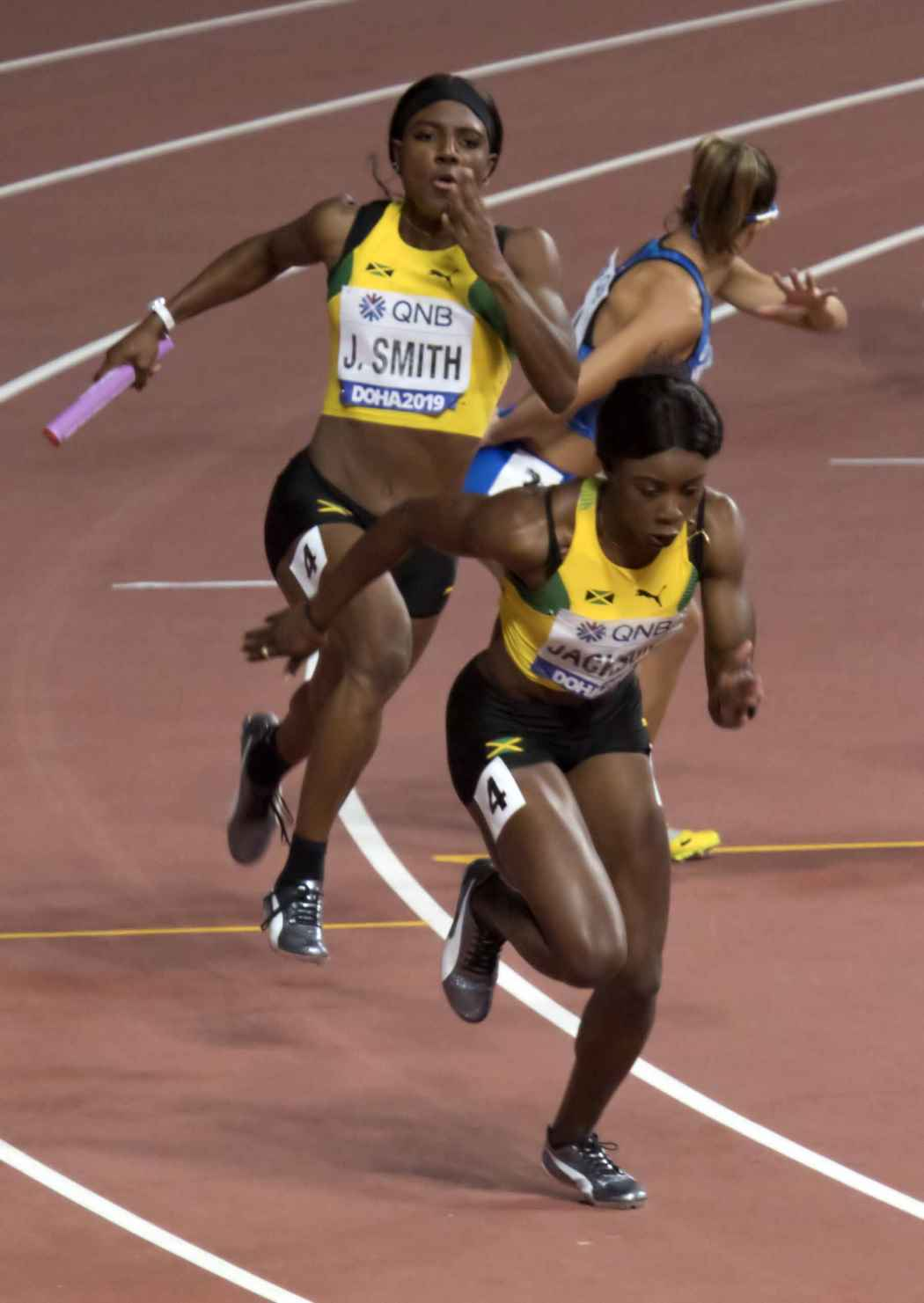
- Smith (left) at the 2019 World Championships

Personal information
- Full name: Jonielle Antonique Smith
- Born: 30 January 1996 (age 30) Kingston, Jamaica
- Height: 1.70 m (5 ft 7 in)
- Weight: 68 kg (150 lb)

Sport
- Country: Jamaica
- Sport: Athletics
- Event: 100 metres
- College team: Auburn Tigers
- Club: MVP International
- Turned pro: 2018
- Coached by: Henry Rolle; Stephen Francis
Medal record
Women's athletics
Representing Jamaica
World Championships
Gold medal – first place	2019 Doha	4 × 100 m relay
Silver medal – second place	2025 Tokyo	4 × 100 m relay
World Ultimate Championship
Second place	2026 Budapest	Mixed 4 × 100 m relay
World Relays
Gold medal – first place	2026 Gaborone	4×100 m relay
Silver medal – second place	2019 Yokohama	4×100 m relay
NACAC Championships
Gold medal – first place	2025 Freeport	100 m
Silver medal – second place	2018 Toronto	100 m
Silver medal – second place	2018 Toronto	4 × 100 m relay
Central American and Caribbean Games
Gold medal – first place	2018 Barranquilla	100 m
Gold medal – first place	2018 Barranquilla	4 × 100 m relay
Pan American Games (Junior)
Silver medal – second place	2015 Edmonton	4 × 100 m relay
CARIFTA Games (Junior)
Gold medal – first place	2014 Fort-de-France	100 m
Gold medal – first place	2014 Fort-de-France	4 × 100 m relay
CARIFTA Games (Youth)
Gold medal – first place	2011 Montego Bay	4 × 100 m relay
Silver medal – second place	2011 Montego Bay	200 m

Jonielle Antonique Smith (born 30 January 1996) is a Jamaican sprinter who specializes in the 100 metres.

== Biography ==
Smith participated in the ISSA Boys and Girls Championships as a junior successfully securing medals for Wolmer's School for Girls under the training prowess of Michael Carr. And garnering medals at CARIFTA.

She attended and graduated from Auburn University, competing for the Auburn Tigers from 2015 to 2018. She now trains at MVP International in Florida, an extension of the Jamaica-based MVP Track Club. She is coached by Henry Rolle who originally recruited her to Auburn.

CAREER

=== 2019-2024 ===
In May, at the 2019 IAAF World Relays - Women's 4 × 100 metres relay, Jonielle was a member of the team earning silver in 43.29.

She won gold with team Jamaica in the women's 4 × 100 metres relay at the 2019 World Championships, and was also a 100 metres finalist.

Recently, in a YouTube interview with renown Jamaican sports analyst Leighton Levy, Jonielle revealed that years of injury setbacks from a car accident in 2019 hampered her career. She recovered enough through perseverance and support from family and friends to return to the track.

=== 2025 ===
She finished fifth in the 100 m at the National Senior Trials for the upcoming World Championships in Tokyo. However, she was selected to six member relay squad.

In September, Smith returned to international competition to anchor the 4 × 100 m relay team to second in 41.79 SB in rainy weather at the 2025 World Athletics Championships in Tokyo, Japan.

=== 2026 ===
At the Qwick Meet 2026 held at the GC Foster College in Jamaica, she recorded a 6.96 (+2.3) 60 metres race finishing first. This is first time she went below 7.00.

In April 2026 at Velocity Fest 19, she placed second in the 100 metres in 10.99, a repeat of the semifinal time, behind Lavanya Williams 10.96.

In Torun, Poland, at the 2026 World Athletics Indoor Championships - Women's 60 metres, she finished fifth in the final clocking 7.06, after reaching a 7.03 PB to win the semis.

On May 3rd, at the 2026 World Athletics Relays - Women's 4 × 100 metres relay in Gaborone, Botswana, the team including Briana Williams, Jodean Williams, Lavanya Williams, and Elaine Thompson Herah placed gold in 42.00s. The day before, Smith helped qualify the squad winning the heats in 41.96s.

On May 9, at the JAAA Puma meet, she clocked 11.06 in the 100 metres for 3rd behind the Clayton twins for an MVP sweep.

At the 2026 Commonwealth Games in Glasgow, Scotland, she qualified for the finals of the 100 m, but did not show at the starting line. In Brussels at the Wanda Diamond League finals, Smith placed fifth in 11.08 (+0.3). To close the season, Jonielle ran the last leg for the Jamaican mixed 4 × 100 m relay team that earned silver in 39.72 at the inaugural 2026 World Athletics Ultimate Championship in Budapest, Hungary.

== Athletics achievements ==
Information from her World Athletics profile unless otherwise noted.

=== Personal bests ===
Type	Distance	Time (s)	Wind (m/s)	Venue	Date	Notes
Individual events
Indoor	60 metres	7.03	—N/a	Toruń, Poland	21 March 2026	
Indoor	200 metres sh	23.48	—N/a	Fayetteville, United States	13 February 2016	
Outdoor	100 metres	10.89	0.0	Eugene, United States	4 July 2026	
Outdoor	200 metres	23.22	+1.9	Auburn, United States	22 April 2017	
Team events
Outdoor	4 × 100 metres relay	41.44	—N/a	Doha, Qatar	5 October 2019	
Outdoor	Mixed 4 × 100 metres relay	39.72	—N/a	Budapest, Hungary	11 September 2026	

=== International competitions ===
Representing Jamaica
Year	Competition	Venue	Position	Event	Time	Notes
2011	CARIFTA Youth Games	Montego Bay, Jamaica	2nd	200 m	24.14	
2011	CARIFTA Youth Games	Montego Bay, Jamaica	1st	4 × 100 m relay	45.75	
2013	World Youth Championships	Donetsk, Ukraine	18th (sf)	100 m	12.01	
2013	World Youth Championships	Donetsk, Ukraine	11th (sf)	200 m	24.13	
2014	CARIFTA Junior Games	Fort-de-France, Martinique	1st	100 m	11.17	
2014	CARIFTA Junior Games	Fort-de-France, Martinique	1st	4 × 100 m relay	44.16	
2015	Pan American Junior Championships	Edmonton, Canada	4th	100 m	11.56	
2015	Pan American Junior Championships	Edmonton, Canada	2nd	4 × 100 m relay	44.31	
2018	Central American and Caribbean Games	Barranquilla, Colombia	1st	100 m	11.04	
2018	Central American and Caribbean Games	Barranquilla, Colombia	1st	4 × 100 m relay	43.41	
2018	North American, Central American and Caribbean Championships	Toronto, Canada	2nd	100 m	11.07	
2018	North American, Central American and Caribbean Championships	Toronto, Canada	2nd	4 × 100 m relay	43.33	
2019	World Relays	Yokohama, Japan	2nd	4 × 100 m relay	43.29	WQ
2019	World Championships	Doha, Qatar	6th	100 m	11.06	
2019	World Championships	Doha, Qatar	1st	4 × 100 m relay	41.44	WL
2025	North American, Central American and Caribbean Championships	Freeport, Bahamas	1st	100 m	11.05	
2025	World Championships	Tokyo, Japan	2nd	4 × 100 m relay	41.79	SB
2026	World Indoor Championships	Toruń, Poland	5th	60 m	7.06	
2026	World Relays	Gaborone, Botswana	1st	4 × 100 m relay	41.96 (Note: Time from the heats; she did not run in the final)	WQ SB
2026	Commonwealth Games	Glasgow, United Kingdom	5th (sf)	100 m	11.07 (Note: Time from the semi-finals; she did not start in the final)	
2026	World Ultimate Championships	Budapest, Hungary	4th	100 m	10.94	
2026	World Ultimate Championships	Budapest, Hungary	2nd	mixed 4 × 100 m relay	39.72	

=== National championships and competitions ===
Year	Competition	Venue	Position	Event	Time	Wind (m/s)	Notes
2012	Jamaican U18 Championships	Kingston	—	100 m	12.77 (Note: Time from the heats; she did not proceed to the final)	-4.5	
2013	Jamaican U18 Championships	Kingston	1st	100 m	11.69	+2.4	
2013	Jamaican U18 Championships	Kingston	1st	200 m	24.27	-0.5	
2014	Jamaican Championships	Kingston	9th (h)	200 m	24.04	+0.1	
2015	NCAA Division I Championships	Eugene, Oregon	16th (h)	100 m	11.37	+1.8	
2015	Jamaican Championships	Kingston	8th	100 m	11.50	+0.4	
2017	NCAA Division I Championships	Eugene, Oregon	20th (h)	100 m	11.51	-1.6	
2017	NCAA Division I Championships	Eugene, Oregon	—	4 × 100 m relay	DNF	—N/a	
2017	Jamaican Championships	Kingston	DQ	100 m	11.23 (Note: Time from the heats; disqualified in semi-finals)	-1.4	
2018	NCAA Division I Indoor Championships	College Station, Texas	4th	60 m	7.19	—N/a	
2018	NCAA Division I Championships	Eugene, Oregon	4th	100 m	11.40	-0.7	
2018	Jamaican Championships	Kingston	4th	100 m	11.15	+0.4	
2019	Jamaican Championships	Kingston	3rd	100 m	11.04	+0.6	
2022	Jamaican Championships	Kingston	8th	100 m	11.89	+0.9	
2023	Jamaican Championships	Kingston	12th (sf)	100 m	11.45	-0.9	
2024	Jamaican Championships	Kingston	14th (sf)	100 m	11.28	+1.5	
2025	Jamaican Championships	Kingston	5th	100 m	11.06	+0.1	
2026	Jamaican Championships	Kingston	3rd	100 m	10.94	-0.3	
