= 2013 World Youth Championships in Athletics – Girls' 100 metres =

Girls' 100 metres at the 2013 World Youth Championships in Athletics
- Venue: RSC Olimpiyskiy
- Dates: 10 July (heats); 11 July (semifinal & final)
- Competitors: 61
- Winning time: 11.33 PB

Medalists
gold medal	Ky Westbrook	United States
silver medal	Ariana Washington	United States
bronze medal	Ángela Tenorio	Ecuador

The girls' 100 metres at the 2013 World Youth Championships in Athletics was held on 10 and 11 July.

== Medalists ==
Event	Gold	Silver	Bronze
Girls' 100 metres	Ky Westbrook (USA)	Ariana Washington (USA)	Ángela Tenorio (ECU)

== Records ==
Prior to the competition, the following records were as follows.

World Youth Best	Chandra Cheeseborough (USA)	11.13	Eugene, OR, United States	21 June 1976
Championship Record	Jessica Onyepunuka (USA)	11.31	Sherbrooke, Canada	11 July 2003
World Youth Leading	Ángela Tenorio (ECU)	11.30	Quito, Ecuador	29 June 2013

== Heats ==
Qualification rule: first 2 of each heat (Q) and next 8 fastest (q) qualified.

=== Heat 1 ===
Rank	Lane	Name	Nationality	Time	Notes
1	3	Annalisa Spadotto Scott	Italy	12.12	Q
2	1	Jonielle Smith	Jamaica	12.13	Q
3	2	Kayelle Clarke	Trinidad and Tobago	12.40	
4	8	Ivana Macanovic	Bosnia and Herzegovina	12.48	
5	7	Mizuki Nakamura	Japan	12.55	
6	6	Chloe Williams	Saint Kitts and Nevis	12.57	
7	5	Kristina Gabrielyan	Armenia	13.15	
	4	Vashti Agege	Nauru	DQ	

=== Heat 2 ===
Rank	Lane	Name	Nationality	Time	Notes
1	4	Ewa Swoboda	Poland	11.72	Q
2	3	Julia Viktoria Calliari	Italy	12.12	Q, PB
3	1	Nelda Huggins	British Virgin Islands	12.15	
4	5	Mariana González	Mexico	12.32	
5	7	Makeya White	Bahamas	12.61	
6	2	Ruvarashe Mzinde	Zimbabwe	12.85	
7	8	Brigitte Bangoura	Senegal	12.97	PB
8	6	Raquel Walker	Guam	13.03	

=== Heat 3 ===
Rank	Lane	Name	Nationality	Time	Notes
1	4	Jessie Maduka	Germany	11.83	Q
2	5	Ingrid Andrés	Spain	11.92	Q, PB
3	3	Vitoria Cristina Rosa	Brazil	12.00	q
4	2	Tiffany Tshilumba	Luxembourg	12.08	
5	8	Yudum İlıksız	Turkey	12.35	
6	1	Zorana Barjaktarovic	Serbia	12.78	
7	6	Aminata Keita	Mali	13.27	PB
8	7	Melissa Michelotti	San Marino	13.58	

=== Heat 4 ===
Rank	Lane	Name	Nationality	Time	Notes
1	4	Ángela Tenorio	Ecuador	11.56	Q
2	1	Dutee Chand	India	11.62	Q, PB
3	6	Cecilia Tamayo	Mexico	11.76	q, PB
4	5	Leya Buchanan	Canada	12.05	q
5	7	Kaja Debevec	Slovenia	12.16	SB
6	8	Sofia Duarte	Portugal	12.47	
7	3	Ka Lam Lo	Hong Kong	12.51	
8	2	Kayla King	United States Virgin Islands	12.53	

=== Heat 5 ===
Rank	Lane	Name	Nationality	Time	Notes
1	4	Irene Ekelund	Sweden	11.61	Q
2	2	Tamzin Thomas	South Africa	11.69	Q, PB
3	6	Adewumi Deborah Adewale	Nigeria	11.89	q
4	3	Zoe Hobbs	New Zealand	11.92	q, PB
5	5	Alina Kalistratova	Ukraine	12.36	
6	8	Õilme Võro	Estonia	12.45	PB
	7	Wang Xuan	China	DNS	

=== Heat 6 ===
Rank	Lane	Name	Nationality	Time	Notes
1	7	Ariana Washington	United States	11.52	Q
2	2	Jenae Ambrose	Bahamas	11.99	Q
3	8	Ge Manqi	China	12.05	q
4	3	Taahira Butterfield	Bermuda	12.19	
5	4	Zouaouia Berhil	Algeria	12.49	
6	6	Oleksandra Romanyuk	Ukraine	12.52	
7	5	Anna Paula Auziņa	Latvia	12.52	

=== Heat 7 ===
Rank	Lane	Name	Nationality	Time	Notes
1	7	Ky Westbrook	United States	11.59	Q
2	8	Veronika Paličková	Czech Republic	12.10	Q
3	6	Taylor Hill	British Virgin Islands	12.10	
4	3	Noeli Martínez	Argentina	12.13	PB
5	2	Melinda Ferenczi	Hungary	12.16	
6	4	Annelouise Jensen	Denmark	12.31	
7	5	Robyn Zammit	Malta	12.66	

=== Heat 8 ===
Rank	Lane	Name	Nationality	Time	Notes
1	7	Kristina Sivkova	Russia	11.78	Q
2	8	Veronica Shanti Pereira	Singapore	11.89	Q, PB
3	3	Saqukine Cameron	Jamaica	11.90	q
4	4	Mirna Marques da Silva	Brazil	12.02	q, PB
5	6	Natasha Brown	Canada	12.08	
6	2	Gabriela Delgado	Peru	12.57	
7	1	Aldana Pucharcos	Argentina	12.80	
8	5	Cristina Llovera	Andorra	12.92	

== Semifinals ==
Qualification rule: first 2 of each heat (Q) plus the 2 fastest times (q) qualified.

=== Heat 1 ===
Wind: +0.2 m/s

Rank	Lane	Name	Nationality	Time	Notes
1	5	Ariana Washington	United States	11.48	Q
2	6	Kristina Sivkova	Russia	11.70	Q
3	3	Jessie Maduka	Germany	11.77	q
4	1	Saqukine Cameron	Jamaica	11.83	
5	4	Ingrid Andres	Spain	11.89	PB
6	7	Deborah Adewunmi Adewale	Nigeria	11.98	
7	8	Jenae Ambrose	Bahamas	12.02	
8	2	Leya Buchanan	Canada	12.29	

=== Heat 2 ===
Wind: -0.3 m/s

Rank	Lane	Name	Nationality	Time	Notes
1	3	Ángela Tenorio	Ecuador	11.51	Q
2	5	Ewa Swoboda	Poland	11.71	Q
3	8	Cecilia Tamayo	Mexico	11.86	
4	4	Veronica Shanti Pereira	Singapore	11.96	
5	2	Zoe Hobbs	New Zealand	11.97	
6	1	Mirna Marques da Silva	Brazil	11.99	PB
7	6	Annalisa Spadotto Scott	Italy	12.11	
8	7	Veronika Paličková	Czech Republic	12.12	

=== Heat 3 ===
Wind: -1.8 m/s

Rank	Lane	Name	Nationality	Time	Notes
1	4	Ky Westbrook	United States	11.52	Q
2	5	Irene Ekelund	Sweden	11.55	Q
3	6	Dutee Chand	India	11.72	q
4	3	Tamzin Thomas	South Africa	11.82	
5	1	Vitoria Cristina Rosa	Brazil	11.98	
6	7	Jonielle Smith	Jamaica	12.01	
7	2	Ge Manqi	China	12.08	
8	8	Julia Viktoria Calliari	Italy	12.18	

== Final ==
Wind: -0.8 m/s

Rank	Lane	Name	Nationality	Time	Notes
1st place, gold medalist(s)	4	Ky Westbrook	United States	11.33	PB
2nd place, silver medalist(s)	6	Ariana Washington	United States	11.40	
3rd place, bronze medalist(s)	3	Ángela Tenorio	Ecuador	11.41	
4	7	Ewa Swoboda	Poland	11.61	
5	5	Irene Ekelund	Sweden	11.62	
6	2	Dutee Chand	India	11.71	
7	1	Jessie Maduka	Germany	11.84	
8	8	Kristina Sivkova	Russia	28.87	
