= Piccirillo =

Piccirillo is an Italian surname. Notable people with the surname include:

- Angel Piccirillo (born 1994), American middle-distance runner
- Hervé Piccirillo (born 1967), French football referee
- Lisa Piccirillo (born 1991), American mathematician
- Michele Piccirillo (born 1970), Italian boxer
- Michele Piccirillo (archaeologist) (1944–2008), Franciscan priest and expert in Byzantine archaeology
- Mike Piccirillo (born 1951), American musician
