= 2016 NCAA Division I Indoor Track and Field Championships =

- Dates: March 11–12, 2016
- Host city: Birmingham, Alabama; University of Alabama at Birmingham
- Venue: Birmingham CrossPlex
- Events: 32

The 2016 NCAA Division I Indoor Track and Field Championships was the 52nd NCAA Men's Division I Indoor Track and Field Championships and the 35th NCAA Women's Division I Indoor Track and Field Championships, held at the Birmingham CrossPlex in Birmingham, Alabama near the campus of the host school, the University of Alabama at Birmingham. In total, thirty-two different men's and women's indoor track and field events were contested from March 11 to March 12, 2016.

== Results ==
=== Men's results ===
==== 60 meters ====
- Final results shown, not prelims

Rank	Name	University	Time	Notes
1st place, gold medalist(s)	Ronnie Baker	TCU	6.47	
2nd place, silver medalist(s)	Cameron Burrell	Houston	6.48	
3rd place, bronze medalist(s)	Christian Coleman	Tennessee	6.52	
4	John Teeters	Oklahoma State	6.53	
5	Jarrion Lawson	Arkansas	6.60	
6	Tevin Hester	Clemson	6.64	
7	Kenzo Cotton	Arkansas	6.70	
8	Bryce Robinson	Tulsa	7.33	

==== 200 meters ====
- Final results shown, not prelims

Rank	Name	University	Time	Notes
1st place, gold medalist(s)	Christian Coleman	Tennessee	20.55	
2nd place, silver medalist(s)	Nethaneel Mitchell-Blake	LSU	20.63	
3rd place, bronze medalist(s)	Kenzo Cotton	Arkansas	20.74	
4	Brendon Rodney	LIU Brooklyn	20.77	
5	Tevin Hester	Clemson	21.02	
6	Nick Gray	Ohio State University	21.11	
7	Sam Watts	TCU	22.06	
	Arman Hall	Florida	DNF	

==== 400 meters ====
- Final results shown, not prelims

Rank	Name	University	Time	Notes
1st place, gold medalist(s)	Zack Bilderback	Texas	46.03	
2nd place, silver medalist(s)	Nathan Strother	Tennessee	46.28	
3rd place, bronze medalist(s)	Michael Cherry	LSU	46.34	
4	Arman Hall	Florida	46.44	
5	Fitzroy Dunkley	LSU	46.46	
6	Najee Glass	Florida	46.60	
7	Emmanuel Dasor	WKU	46.61	
8	Wil London	Baylor University	46.88	

==== 800 meters ====
- Final results shown, not prelims

Rank	Name	University	Time	Notes
1st place, gold medalist(s)	Clayton Murphy	Akron	1:46.68	
2nd place, silver medalist(s)	Eliud Rutto Kenya	Middle Tennessee	1:46.81	
3rd place, bronze medalist(s)	Shaquille Walker	BYU	1:47.50	
4	Hector Hernandez Mexico	Texas A&M	1:47.55	
5	Robert Heppenstall Canada	Wake Forest	1:49.06	
6	Carlton Orange	Arkansas	1:49.69	
7	Brannon Kidder	Penn State	1:50.29	
8	Dylan Capwell	Monmouth University	1:51.21	
9	Goaner Deng	Minnesota	DNF	

==== Mile ====
- Final results shown, not prelims

Rank	Name	University	Time	Notes
1st place, gold medalist(s)	Henry Wynne	University of Virginia	4:06.63	
2nd place, silver medalist(s)	Blake Haney	University of Oregon	4:06.75	
3rd place, bronze medalist(s)	Thomas Awad	University of Penn	4:06.97	
4	Sam Prakel	University of Oregon	4:07.06	
5	David Elliott	Boise State University	4:07.16	
6	Jonah Koech Kenya	University of Texas El Paso	4:07.52	
7	Julian Oakley	Providence College	4:07.75	
8	Adam Palamar	Syracuse University	4:07.89	
9	James Gowans	Cornell University	4:08.14	
10	Jacob Burcham	University of Oklahoma	4:10.26	

==== 3000 meters ====
- Final results shown, not prelims

Rank	Name	University	Time	Notes
1st place, gold medalist(s)	Edward Cheserek	University of Oregon	8:00.40	
2nd place, silver medalist(s)	Sean McGorty	Stanford University	8:01.55	
3rd place, bronze medalist(s)	Justyn Knight Canada	Syracuse University	8:01.85	
4	Izaic Yorks	University of Washington	8:02.24	
5	Pierce Murphy	University of Colorado	8:02.40	
6	Jefferson Abbey	Colorado State University	8:02.43	
7	Luis Vargas (athlete)	NC State	8:02.43	
8	Colby Gilbert	University of Washington	8:02.83	
9	Patrick Corona	Air Force	8:03.12	
10	Connor Winter	University of Colorado	8:04.23	
11	Willy Fink	Eastern Michigan University	8:07.81	
12	Morgan McDonald Australia	University of Wisconsin	8:12.92	
13	David Elliott (athlete)	Boise State University	8:16.63	
14	Ahmed Bile	Georgetown University	8:24.15	
15	Reid Buchanan	University of Portland	8:36.41	

== Women's results ==
- Final results shown, not prelims

=== Women's 60 Meters ===
Rank	Athlete	Team	Mark
1st place, gold medalist(s)	Teahna Daniels	Texas	7.11
2nd place, silver medalist(s)	Hannah Cunliffe	Oregon	7.12
3rd place, bronze medalist(s)	Mikiah Brisco	LSU	7.17
4	Jasmine Todd	Oregon	7.19
5	Morolake Akinosun	Texas	7.21
6	Javianne Oliver	Kentucky	7.22
7	Shayla Sanders	Florida	7.22
8	Kennadi Bouyer	Washington	7.46

=== Women's 200 Meters ===
Rank	Athlete	Team	Mark
1st place, gold medalist(s)	Felicia Brown	Tennessee	22.47
2nd place, silver medalist(s)	Kyra Jefferson	Florida	22.83
3rd place, bronze medalist(s)	Hannah Cunliffe	Oregon	22.85
4	Deajah Stevens	Oregon	23.02
5	Daye Shon Roberson	Oklahoma	23.05
6	Deanna Hill	USC	23.05
7	Kali Davis-White	Tennessee	23.08
8	A'Keyla Mitchell	Kansas State	23.31

=== Women's 400 Meters ===
Rank	Athlete	Team	Mark
1st place, gold medalist(s)	Courtney Okolo	Texas	50.69
2nd place, silver medalist(s)	Taylor Ellis-Watson	Arkansas	51.51
3rd place, bronze medalist(s)	Chrisann Gordon	Texas	51.69
4	Shamier Little	Texas A&M	51.74
5	Margaret Bamgbose	Notre Dame	52.12
6	Jaide Stepter	USC	52.22
7	Kyra Jefferson	Florida	52.28
8	Claudia Francis	Florida	52.84

=== Women's 800 Meters ===
Rank	Athlete	Team	Mark
1st place, gold medalist(s)	Raevyn Rogers	Oregon	2:04.68
2nd place, silver medalist(s)	Hanna Green	Virginia Tech	2:05.90
3rd place, bronze medalist(s)	Olivia Baker	Stanford	2:06.08
4	Savannah Camacho	Oklahoma State	2:06.47
5	Shea Collinsworth	BYU	2:06.57
6	Cecilia Barowski	Princeton	2:06.81
7	Ce'aira Brown	Hampton	2:06.87
8	Anima Banks	Duke	2:15.09

=== Women's Mile ===
Rank	Athlete	Team	Mark
1st place, gold medalist(s)	Kaela Edwards	Oklahoma State	4:35.62
2nd place, silver medalist(s)	Angel Piccirillo	Villanova	4:36.26
3rd place, bronze medalist(s)	Elinor Purrier	New Hampshire	4:38.42
4	Andrea Keklak	Georgetown	4:38.44
5	Sophie Connor	New Mexico	4:38.83
6	Erin Teschuk	North Dakota State	4:38.94
7	Megan Moye	North Carolina St.	4:38.99
8	Eleanor Fulton	Washington	4:40.15
9	Heather MacLean	UMass Amherst	4:43.29
10	Grace Barnett	Clemson	4:48.55

=== Women's 3000 Meters ===
Rank	Athlete	Team	Mark
1st place, gold medalist(s)	Molly Seidel	Notre Dame	8:57.86
2nd place, silver medalist(s)	Erin Finn	Michigan	9:04.40
3rd place, bronze medalist(s)	Katrina Coogan	Georgetown	9:07.74
4	Erin Teschuk	North Dakota State	9:08.45
5	Erin Clark	Colorado	9:08.63
6	Calli Thackery	New Mexico	9:09.35
7	Alli Cash	Oregon	9:09.46
8	Kaitlyn Benner	Colorado	9:09.66
9	Bethan Knights	California	9:09.79
10	Vanessa Fraser	Stanford	9:15.09
11	Erika Kemp	North Carolina St.	9:19.88
12	Regan Rome	William and Mary	9:22.60
13	Angel Piccirillo	Villanova	9:25.12

=== Women's 5000 Meters ===
Rank	Athlete	Team	Mark
1st place, gold medalist(s)	Molly Seidel	Notre Dame	15:15.21
2nd place, silver medalist(s)	Erin Finn	Michigan	15:23.16
3rd place, bronze medalist(s)	Chelsea Blaase	Tennessee	15:42.47
4	Anna Rohrer	Notre Dame	15:54.53
5	Erika Kemp	North Carolina St.	15:58.00
6	Sharon Lokedi	Kansas	15:58.61
7	Hannah Everson	Air Force	16:04.37
8	Courtney Smith	Harvard	16:04.86
9	Ednah Kurgat	Liberty	16:07.18
10	Liv Westphal	Boston College	16:11.92
11	Tessa Barrett	Penn State	16:25.94
12	Sarah Collins	Providence	16:33.96
13	Tori Gerlach	Penn State	16:45.56
14	Molly Grabill	Oregon	16:51.25
	Allie Ostrander	Boise State	DNF
	Christina Melian	Stony Brook	DNF

=== Women's 60 Hurdles ===
Rank	Athlete	Team	Mark
1st place, gold medalist(s)	Cindy Ofili	Michigan	7.89
2nd place, silver medalist(s)	Sasha Wallace	Oregon	7.91
3rd place, bronze medalist(s)	Devynne Charlton	Purdue	7.99
4	Daeshon Gordon	LSU	8.04
5	Mikiah Brisco	LSU	8.04
6	Kaila Barber	Notre Dame	8.07
7	Payton Stumbaugh	Arkansas	8.09
8	Alaysha Johnson	Oregon	8.16

=== Women's 4 x 400 Relay ===
Rank	Athlete	Team	Mark
0	Taylor Bennett, Kiana Hawn, Kiana Horton, Olicia Williams	Baylor	DQ
1st place, gold medalist(s)	Chrisann Gordon, Ariel Jones, Morolake Akinosun, Courtney Okolo	Texas	3:28.27
2nd place, silver medalist(s)	Daina Harper, Monisa Dobbins, Brianna Swinton, Taylor Ellis-Watson	Arkansas	3:29.65
3rd place, bronze medalist(s)	Alaysha Johnson, Deajah Stevens, Brooke Feldmeier, Raevyn Rogers	Oregon	3:29.77
4	Jaide Stepter, Kendall Ellis, Amalie Iuel, Deanna Hill	USC	3:29.98
5	Lenysse Dyer, Felecia Majors, Layla White, Felicia Brown	Tennessee	3:31.17
6	Jasmine Mitchell, Destiny Carter, Ariah Graham, Kiah Seymour	Kentucky	3:31.62
7	Robin Reynolds, Kyra Jefferson, Sharrika Barnett, Claudia Francis	Florida	3:32.16
8	Tatum Waggoner, Nnenya Hailey, Gia Trevisan, Sage Watson	Arizona	3:32.78
9	Montayla Holder, Briana Guillory, Alexis Hernandez, Elexis Guster	Iowa	3:33.03
10	Aaliyah Barnes, Beatrice Hannan, Alexis Franklin, Sonikqua Walker	Ohio State	3:33.72
11	Symone Black, Carmiesha Cox, Aarin Jones, Brionna Thomas	Purdue	3:34.12

=== Women's Distance Medley Relay ===
Rank	Athlete	Team	Mark
1st place, gold medalist(s)	Andrea Keklak, Heather Martin, Emma Keenan, Katrina Coogan	Georgetown	10:57.21
2nd place, silver medalist(s)	Baylee Mires, Krista Armstead, Eleanor Fulton, Maddie Meyers	Washington	10:58.52
3rd place, bronze medalist(s)	Elise Cranny, Kristyn Williams, Malika Waschmann, Rebecca Mehra	Stanford	10:58.94
4	Jaimie Phelan, Maya Long, Danielle Pfeifer, Shannon Osika	Michigan	10:59.05
5	Nikki Hiltz, Daina Harper, Therese Haiss, Jessica Kamilos	Arkansas	10:59.22
6	Jessica Harris, Parker English, Jamie Marvil, Danielle Aragon	Notre Dame	11:01.86
7	Lilli Burdon, Ashante Horsley, Annie Leblanc, Ashley Maton	Oregon	11:05.96
8	Kaley Ciluffo, Deja Parrish, Ersula Farrow, Grace Barnett	Clemson	11:12.68
9	Molly Sughroue, Danielle Coleman, Clara Nichols, Anna Boyert	Oklahoma State	11:13.08
10	Hollie Parker, Travia Jones, Hannah Deworth, Morgan Schuetz	LSU	11:23.22
11	Kim Hallowes, Madeline Price, Madeline Kopp, Olivia Anderson	Duke	11:24.47
12	Emily Hosker-Thornhil, Holly VanGrinsven, Zoe Howell, Calli Thackery	New Mexico	11:30.67

=== Women's High Jump ===
Rank	Athlete	Team	Mark
1st place, gold medalist(s)	Akela Jones	Kansas State	1.87m
2nd place, silver medalist(s)	Tatiana Gusin	Georgia	1.84m
3rd place, bronze medalist(s)	Claudia Garcia Jou	Akron	1.84m
3rd place, bronze medalist(s)	Kimberly Williamson	Kansas State	1.84m
3rd place, bronze medalist(s)	Dakota Dailey-Harris	Miami	1.84m
6	Erika Hurd	Cincinnati	1.84m
7	Jailah Mason	Morgan State	1.81m
7	Kaitlin Whitehorn	Dartmouth	1.81m
9	Loretta Blaut	Cincinnati	1.81m
10	Madeline Fagan	Georgia	1.81m
10	Reka Czuth	Nebraska	1.81m
12	Kandie Bloch-Jones	Illinois	1.76m
12	Nicole Greene	North Carolina	1.76m
14	Chanice Porter	Georgia	1.76m
	Ellen DiPietro	Michigan State	NH
	Kendell Williams	Georgia	NH

=== Women's Pole Vault ===
Rank	Athlete	Team	Mark
1st place, gold medalist(s)	Alexis Weeks	Arkansas	4.63m
2nd place, silver medalist(s)	Megan Clark	Duke	4.50m
3rd place, bronze medalist(s)	Diamara Planell Cruz	Washington	4.45m
4	Alysha Newman	Miami	4.40m
5	Kaitlin Petrillose	Texas	4.40m
6	Victoria Weeks	Arkansas	4.30m
7	Emily Grove	South Dakota	4.30m
7	Mackenzie Shell	Oklahoma	4.30m
9	Elizabeth Quick	Washington	4.30m
10	Sydney Clute	Indiana	4.20m
10	Annie Rhodes	Baylor	4.20m
12	Chanel Krause	Louisville	4.20m
12	Kally Long	Texas	4.20m
14	Jessie Johnson	Auburn	4.20m
15	Carolina Carmichael	Memphis	4.10m
	Lindsey Murray	Mississippi	NH

=== Women's Long Jump ===
Rank	Athlete	Team	Mark
1st place, gold medalist(s)	Quanesha Burks	Alabama	6.80m
2nd place, silver medalist(s)	Sha'Keela Saunders	Kentucky	6.56m
3rd place, bronze medalist(s)	Chanice Porter	Georgia	6.52m
4	Keturah Orji	Georgia	6.48m
5	Kendell Williams	Georgia	6.45m
6	Clairwin Dameus	Tennessee St.	6.40m
7	Bria Matthews	Georgia Tech	6.39m
8	Margaux Jones	USC	6.26m
9	Nataliyah Friar	LSU	6.23m
10	Der'Renae Freeman	Florida State	6.23m
11	Jogaile Petrokaite	Florida State	6.19m
12	Kate Hall	Iowa State	6.12m
13	Darrielle McQueen	Florida	6.11m
14	Taliyah Brooks	Arkansas	6.10m
15	Jhoanmy Luque	Iowa State	6.07m
16	Savannah Carson	Purdue	6.00m

=== Women's Triple Jump ===
Rank	Athlete	Team	Mark
1st place, gold medalist(s)	Keturah Orji	Georgia	14.12m
2nd place, silver medalist(s)	Simone Charley	Vanderbilt	13.41m
3rd place, bronze medalist(s)	Natasha Dicks	South Carolina	13.35m
4	Amber Hughes	Tennessee St.	13.25m
5	Tierra Williams	Nebraska	13.22m
6	Bria Matthews	Georgia Tech	13.16m
7	Isabella Marten	California	13.10m
8	Sha'Keela Saunders	Kentucky	13.01m
9	Marshay Ryan	Auburn	12.91m
10	Dannielle Gibson	Penn State	12.88m
11	Jannell Hadnot	New Mexico	12.83m
12	Nickevea Wilson	UTEP	12.82m
13	Darrielle McQueen	Florida	12.80m
14	Yanis David	Florida	12.60m
15	Viershanie Latham	Texas Tech	12.57m
16	Anasterasia Terrell	Clemson	12.57m

=== Women's Shot Put ===
Rank	Athlete	Team	Mark
1st place, gold medalist(s)	Dani Winters	Kansas State	17.97m
2nd place, silver medalist(s)	Cassie Wertman	Tennessee	17.68m
3rd place, bronze medalist(s)	Nikki Okwelogu	Harvard	17.66m
4	Christina Hillman	Iowa State	17.63m
5	Kelsey Card	Wisconsin	17.60m
6	Chase Ealey	Oklahoma State	17.35m
7	Rachel Fatherly	Penn State	17.22m
8	Jessica Woodard	Oklahoma	17.04m
9	Alexis Cooks	Akron	17.02m
10	Brittany Mann	Oregon	16.84m
11	Cion Hicks	Baylor	16.80m
12	Raven Saunders	Mississippi	16.59m
13	Emmonnie Henderson	Louisville	15.88m
14	Breana Jemison	UC Riverside	15.84m
15	Maggie Ewen	Arizona State	15.68m
16	Itohan Aikhionbare	Oregon	15.55m

=== Women's Weight Throw ===
Rank	Athlete	Team	Mark
1st place, gold medalist(s)	Vesta Bell	UC Riverside	22.42m
2nd place, silver medalist(s)	Dolly Nyemah	Louisville	22.21m
3rd place, bronze medalist(s)	Daina Levy	Kansas	21.57m
4	Ashley Jenkins	Sam Houston St.	21.54m
5	Nicole Chavis	North Carolina St.	21.25m
6	Marthaline Cooper	Winthrop	21.24m
7	Beckie Famurewa	Kentucky	20.87m
8	Annette Echikunwoke	Cincinnati	20.81m
9	Alexis Cooks	Akron	20.00m
10	Tiffany Okieme	Miami	19.97m
11	Raqurra Ishmar	East Carolina	19.96m
12	Precious Ogunleye	Miami	19.95m
13	Kelsey Card	Wisconsin	19.77m
14	Chioma Onyekwere	Maryland	19.49m
15	Nakel McClinton	Indiana	18.46m
16	Sasha Lebert	Florida State	17.86m

=== Women's Pentathlon ===
Rank	Athlete	Team	Mark
1st place, gold medalist(s)	Kendell Williams	Georgia	4703
2nd place, silver medalist(s)	Taliyah Brooks	Arkansas	4432
3rd place, bronze medalist(s)	Amalie Iuel	USC	4425
4	Georgia Ellenwood	Wisconsin	4390
5	Payton Stumbaugh	Arkansas	4371
6	Alex Gochenour	Arkansas	4336
7	Xenia Rahn	Georgia	4268
8	Clairwin Dameus	Tennessee St.	4226
9	Leigha Brown	Arkansas	4218
10	Jaclyn Siefring	Akron	4162
11	Michelle Atherley	Auburn	4153
12	Breanne Borman	Wichita State	4003
13	Paige Knodle	Northern Iowa	3912
14	Akela Jones	Kansas State	3623

== See also ==
- NCAA Men's Division I Indoor Track and Field Championships
- NCAA Women's Division I Indoor Track and Field Championships
