= 2014 World Junior Championships in Athletics – Women's 200 metres =

The women's 200 metres event at the 2014 World Junior Championships in Athletics was held in Eugene, Oregon, USA, at Hayward Field on 24 and 25 July.

== Medalists ==
Gold	Kaylin Whitney; United States
Silver	Iréne Ekelund; Sweden
Bronze	Ángela Tenorio; Ecuador

== Records ==
Standing records prior to the 2014 World Junior Championships in Athletics
World Junior Record	Allyson Felix (USA)	22.18	Athens, Greece	25 August 2004
Championship Record	Anthonique Strachan (BAH)	22.53	Barcelona, Spain	13 July 2012
World Junior Leading	Kaylin Whitney (USA)	22.49	Eugene, United States	6 July 2014
Broken records during the 2014 World Junior Championships in Athletics

== Results ==
=== Final ===
25 July
Start time: 19:53 Temperature: 27 °C Humidity: 37 %
Wind: +2.4 m/s

Rank	Name	Nationality	Lane	Reaction Time	Time	Notes
1st place, gold medalist(s)	Kaylin Whitney	United States	3	0.182	22.82 w	
2nd place, silver medalist(s)	Iréne Ekelund	Sweden	4	0.190	22.97 w	
3rd place, bronze medalist(s)	Ángela Tenorio	Ecuador	6	0.167	23.15 w	
4	Shannon Hylton	United Kingdom	8	0.173	23.25 w	
5	Jada Martin	United States	7	0.164	23.35 w	
6	Arialis Gandulla	Cuba	5	0.261	23.48 w	
7	Natalliah Whyte	Jamaica	1	0.210	23.48 w	
8	Gina Lückenkemper	Germany	2	0.311	23.50 w	

Note:
BIB 1630 Kaylin Whitney - Yellow Card - 162.5(b) Delaying the start

=== Semifinals ===
24 July
First 2 in each heat (Q) and the next 2 fastest (q) advance to the Final

==== Summary ====
Rank	Name	Nationality	Time	Notes
1	Iréne Ekelund	Sweden	22.97 w (w: +2.5 m/s)	Q
2	Kaylin Whitney	United States	23.05 (w: +1.4 m/s)	Q
3	Ángela Tenorio	Ecuador	23.16 (w: +1.2 m/s)	Q SB
4	Arialis Gandulla	Cuba	23.22 (w: +1.4 m/s)	Q
5	Shannon Hylton	United Kingdom	23.36 w (w: +2.5 m/s)	Q
6	Natalliah Whyte	Jamaica	23.44 w (w: +2.5 m/s)	q
7	Jada Martin	United States	23.57 (w: +1.2 m/s)	Q
8	Gina Lückenkemper	Germany	23.67 (w: +1.2 m/s)	q
9	Kayelle Clarke	Trinidad and Tobago	23.76 (w: +1.4 m/s)	
9	Johanelis Herrera Abreu	Italy	23.76 w (w: +2.5 m/s)	
11	Sarah Atcho	Switzerland	23.82 w (w: +2.5 m/s)	
12	Raquel Tjernagel	Canada	23.90 w (w: +2.5 m/s)	
13	Maddison Coates	Australia	23.91 (w: +1.4 m/s)	PB
14	Carmiesha Cox	Bahamas	23.92 (w: +1.4 m/s)	SB
15	Vitoria Cristina Rosa	Brazil	24.01 (w: +1.2 m/s)	
16	Tomoka Tsuchihashi	Japan	24.08 w (w: +2.5 m/s)	
17	Liliána Guba	Hungary	24.11 (w: +1.4 m/s)	PB
18	Leya Buchanan	Canada	24.17 (w: +1.2 m/s)	
18	Keianna Albury	Bahamas	24.17 w (w: +2.5 m/s)	
20	Veronica Shanti Pereira	Singapore	24.24 (w: +1.2 m/s)	
21	Praise Oghenefejiro Idamadudu	Nigeria	24.25 (w: +1.2 m/s)	
22	Nelda Huggins	British Virgin Islands	24.31 (w: +1.4 m/s)	
23	Sada Williams	Barbados	24.37 (w: +1.4 m/s)	
24	Simoné Du Plooy	South Africa	24.46 (w: +1.2 m/s)	

==== Details ====
First 2 in each heat (Q) and the next 2 fastest (q) advance to the Final

===== Semifinal 1 =====
25 July
Start time: 18:08 Temperature: 23 °C Humidity: 47 %
Wind: +2.5 m/s

Rank	Name	Nationality	Lane	Reaction Time	Time	Notes
1	Iréne Ekelund	Sweden	6	0.222	22.97 w	Q
2	Shannon Hylton	United Kingdom	3	0.192	23.36 w	Q
3	Natalliah Whyte	Jamaica	5	0.305	23.44 w	q
4	Johanelis Herrera Abreu	Italy	4	0.258	23.76 w	
5	Sarah Atcho	Switzerland	7	0.168	23.82 w	
6	Raquel Tjernagel	Canada	8	0.190	23.90 w	
7	Tomoka Tsuchihashi	Japan	2	0.245	24.08 w	
8	Keianna Albury	Bahamas	1	0.297	24.17 w	

===== Semifinal 2 =====
25 July
Start time: 18:14 Temperature: 23 °C Humidity: 44 %
Wind: +1.2 m/s

Rank	Name	Nationality	Lane	Reaction Time	Time	Notes
1	Ángela Tenorio	Ecuador	4	0.165	23.16	Q SB
2	Jada Martin	United States	6	0.160	23.57	Q
3	Gina Lückenkemper	Germany	3	0.265	23.67	q
4	Vitoria Cristina Rosa	Brazil	7	0.205	24.01	
5	Leya Buchanan	Canada	2	0.146	24.17	
6	Veronica Shanti Pereira	Singapore	5	0.206	24.24	
7	Praise Oghenefejiro Idamadudu	Nigeria	8	0.204	24.25	
8	Simoné Du Plooy	South Africa	1	0.191	24.46	

===== Semifinal 3 =====
25 July
Start time: 18:22 Temperature: 23 °C Humidity: 44 %
Wind: +1.4 m/s

Rank	Name	Nationality	Lane	Reaction Time	Time	Notes
1	Kaylin Whitney	United States	4	0.213	23.05	Q
2	Arialis Gandulla	Cuba	5	0.214	23.22	Q
3	Kayelle Clarke	Trinidad and Tobago	3	0.208	23.76	
4	Maddison Coates	Australia	6	0.217	23.91	PB
5	Carmiesha Cox	Bahamas	7	0.260	23.92	SB
6	Liliána Guba	Hungary	2	0.216	24.11	PB
7	Nelda Huggins	British Virgin Islands	1	0.193	24.31	
8	Sada Williams	Barbados	8	0.247	24.37	

=== Heats ===
24 July
First 3 in each heat (Q) and the next 3 fastest (q) advance to the Semi-Finals

==== Summary ====
Rank	Name	Nationality	Time	Notes
1	Gina Lückenkemper	Germany	23.31 (w: +0.9 m/s)	Q
1	Kaylin Whitney	United States	23.31 w (w: +2.1 m/s)	Q
3	Iréne Ekelund	Sweden	23.47 (w: -1.8 m/s)	Q
4	Natalliah Whyte	Jamaica	23.48 (w: +1.9 m/s)	Q
5	Ángela Tenorio	Ecuador	23.55 (w: +0.9 m/s)	Q
6	Jada Martin	United States	23.62 (w: +0.1 m/s)	Q
7	Johanelis Herrera Abreu	Italy	23.70 (w: +1.9 m/s)	Q PB
8	Raquel Tjernagel	Canada	23.75 (w: +1.9 m/s)	Q PB
9	Shannon Hylton	United Kingdom	23.78 (w: -1.8 m/s)	Q
10	Arialis Gandulla	Cuba	23.80 (w: -1.2 m/s)	Q
11	Veronica Shanti Pereira	Singapore	23.87 w (w: +2.1 m/s)	Q
12	Sarah Atcho	Switzerland	23.94 w (w: +2.1 m/s)	Q
13	Keianna Albury	Bahamas	23.96 w (w: +2.1 m/s)	q
13	Leya Buchanan	Canada	23.96 w (w: +2.1 m/s)	q
15	Kayelle Clarke	Trinidad and Tobago	24.00 (w: +0.1 m/s)	Q
16	Nelda Huggins	British Virgin Islands	24.03 (w: +1.9 m/s)	q
17	Vitoria Cristina Rosa	Brazil	24.05 (w: +0.9 m/s)	Q
18	Cliodhna Manning	Ireland	24.15 (w: +0.9 m/s)	PB
19	Carmiesha Cox	Bahamas	24.18 (w: +0.1 m/s)	Q SB
20	Maddison Coates	Australia	24.20 (w: -1.8 m/s)	Q
20	Sada Williams	Barbados	24.20 (w: -1.2 m/s)	Q
22	Anna Doi	Japan	24.23 w (w: +2.1 m/s)	
23	Liliána Guba	Hungary	24.26 (w: -1.2 m/s)	Q PB
24	Cecilia Tamayo	Mexico	24.32 (w: +0.1 m/s)	
25	Zion Corrales-Nelson	Philippines	24.34 (w: +0.1 m/s)	
26	Loungo Matlhaku	Botswana	24.39 w (w: +2.1 m/s)	
27	Praise Oghenefejiro Idamadudu	Nigeria	24.43 (w: -1.8 m/s)	Q
28	Robyn Haupt	South Africa	24.44 (w: +0.1 m/s)	
29	Simoné Du Plooy	South Africa	24.45 (w: -1.8 m/s)	Q
29	Evelyn Rivera	Colombia	24.45 (w: +1.9 m/s)	
31	Kedisha Dallas	Jamaica	24.46 (w: -1.8 m/s)	
32	Tomoka Tsuchihashi	Japan	24.49 (w: -1.8 m/s)	Q
33	Kayla Anise Richardson	Philippines	24.53 (w: -1.2 m/s)	
34	Ioana Gheorghe	Romania	24.56 (w: -1.8 m/s)	
34	Mirna da Silva	Brazil	24.56 (w: -1.2 m/s)	
36	Brenessa Thompson	Guyana	24.61 (w: +0.9 m/s)	
37	Maja Pogorevc	Slovenia	24.65 (w: +1.9 m/s)	
38	Nigina Sharipova	Uzbekistan	24.68 (w: -1.8 m/s)	
38	Savannah Mapalagama	Austria	24.68 (w: -1.2 m/s)	
40	Annalisa Spadotto Scott	Italy	24.83 (w: -1.8 m/s)	
41	Astrid Balanta	Colombia	24.88 (w: +0.9 m/s)	
42	Suzie Acolatse	Ghana	24.92 (w: -1.2 m/s)	
43	Valeria Barón	Argentina	25.15 (w: -1.8 m/s)	
44	Zofia Wróblewska	Poland	25.16 (w: +0.1 m/s)	
45	Liliya Manasipova	Uzbekistan	25.25 (w: +0.9 m/s)	
46	Niamh McNicol	Ireland	25.38 (w: -1.8 m/s)	
47	Drita Islami	North Macedonia	25.91 (w: -1.2 m/s)	PB
48	Tegest Tamangnu	Ethiopia	27.98 (w: +1.9 m/s)	
49	Leandry-Celeste Digombou	Gabon	30.00 (w: -1.8 m/s)	PB
	Ewa Swoboda	Poland	DNF	
	Dina Asher-Smith	United Kingdom	DNS	
	María Ignacia Montt	Chile	DNS	
	Tiffany Tshilumba	Luxembourg	DNS	

==== Details ====
First 3 in each heat (Q) and the next 3 fastest (q) advance to the Semi-Finals

===== Heat 1 =====
25 July
Start time: 11:38 Temperature: 20 °C Humidity: 56 %
Wind: -1.8 m/s

Rank	Name	Nationality	Lane	Reaction Time	Time	Notes
1	Iréne Ekelund	Sweden	2	0.200	23.47	Q
2	Shannon Hylton	United Kingdom	1	0.211	23.78	Q
3	Tomoka Tsuchihashi	Japan	4	0.195	24.49	Q
4	Ioana Gheorghe	Romania	8	0.207	24.56	
5	Nigina Sharipova	Uzbekistan	5	0.212	24.68	
6	Valeria Barón	Argentina	6	0.276	25.15	
7	Leandry-Celeste Digombou	Gabon	7	0.227	30.00	PB
	Ewa Swoboda	Poland	3	0.156	DNF	

===== Heat 2 =====
25 July
Start time: 11:45 Temperature: 20 °C Humidity: 56 %
Wind: -1.8 m/s

Rank	Name	Nationality	Lane	Reaction Time	Time	Notes
1	Maddison Coates	Australia	4	0.192	24.20	Q
2	Praise Oghenefejiro Idamadudu	Nigeria	1	0.260	24.43	Q
3	Simoné Du Plooy	South Africa	2	0.181	24.45	Q
4	Kedisha Dallas	Jamaica	3	0.175	24.46	
5	Annalisa Spadotto Scott	Italy	6	0.199	24.83	
6	Niamh McNicol	Ireland	7	0.188	25.38	
	Dina Asher-Smith	United Kingdom	5		DNS	

===== Heat 3 =====
25 July
Start time: 11:51 Temperature: 20 °C Humidity: 56 %
Wind: -1.2 m/s

Rank	Name	Nationality	Lane	Reaction Time	Time	Notes
1	Arialis Gandulla	Cuba	4	0.208	23.80	Q
2	Sada Williams	Barbados	7	0.220	24.20	Q
3	Liliána Guba	Hungary	5	0.264	24.26	Q PB
4	Kayla Anise Richardson	Philippines	2	0.185	24.53	
5	Mirna da Silva	Brazil	3	0.195	24.56	
6	Savannah Mapalagama	Austria	8	0.210	24.68	
7	Suzie Acolatse	Ghana	1	0.283	24.92	
8	Drita Islami	North Macedonia	6	0.211	25.91	PB

===== Heat 4 =====
25 July
Start time: 11:56 Temperature: 20 °C Humidity: 56 %
Wind: +0.1 m/s

Rank	Name	Nationality	Lane	Reaction Time	Time	Notes
1	Jada Martin	United States	7	0.185	23.62	Q
2	Kayelle Clarke	Trinidad and Tobago	3	0.211	24.00	Q
3	Carmiesha Cox	Bahamas	1	0.246	24.18	Q SB
4	Cecilia Tamayo	Mexico	5	0.221	24.32	
5	Zion Corrales-Nelson	Philippines	6	0.182	24.34	
6	Robyn Haupt	South Africa	2	0.209	24.44	
7	Zofia Wróblewska	Poland	4	0.185	25.16	

===== Heat 5 =====
25 July
Start time: 12:02 Temperature: 20 °C Humidity: 56 %
Wind: +2.1 m/s

Rank	Name	Nationality	Lane	Reaction Time	Time	Notes
1	Kaylin Whitney	United States	3	0.188	23.31 w	Q
2	Veronica Shanti Pereira	Singapore	6	0.200	23.87 w	Q
3	Sarah Atcho	Switzerland	5	0.189	23.94 w	Q
4	Keianna Albury	Bahamas	2	0.182	23.96 w	q
5	Leya Buchanan	Canada	4	0.137	23.96 w	q
6	Anna Doi	Japan	1	0.163	24.23 w	
7	Loungo Matlhaku	Botswana	7	0.163	24.39 w	

===== Heat 6 =====
25 July
Start time: 12:09 Temperature: 21 °C Humidity: 53 %
Wind: +1.9 m/s

Rank	Name	Nationality	Lane	Reaction Time	Time	Notes
1	Natalliah Whyte	Jamaica	2	0.180	23.48	Q
2	Johanelis Herrera Abreu	Italy	1	0.251	23.70	Q PB
3	Raquel Tjernagel	Canada	8	0.192	23.75	Q PB
4	Nelda Huggins	British Virgin Islands	6	0.194	24.03	q
5	Evelyn Rivera	Colombia	5	0.199	24.45	
6	Maja Pogorevc	Slovenia	3	0.206	24.65	
7	Tegest Tamangnu	Ethiopia	7	0.199	27.98	
	María Ignacia Montt	Chile	4		DNS	

===== Heat 7 =====
25 July
Start time: 12:15 Temperature: 20 °C Humidity: 56 %
Wind: +0.9 m/s

Rank	Name	Nationality	Lane	Reaction Time	Time	Notes
1	Gina Lückenkemper	Germany	3	0.299	23.31	Q
2	Ángela Tenorio	Ecuador	6	0.196	23.55	Q
3	Vitoria Cristina Rosa	Brazil	5	0.223	24.05	Q
4	Cliodhna Manning	Ireland	7	0.193	24.15	PB
5	Brenessa Thompson	Guyana	8	0.192	24.61	
6	Astrid Balanta	Colombia	1	0.191	24.88	
7	Liliya Manasipova	Uzbekistan	4	0.240	25.25	
	Tiffany Tshilumba	Luxembourg	2		DNS	

== Participation ==
According to an unofficial count, 50 athletes from 37 countries participated in the event.

- Argentina (1)
- Australia (1)
- Austria (1)
- Bahamas (2)
- Barbados (1)
- Botswana (1)
- Brazil (2)
- British Virgin Islands (1)
- Canada (2)
- Colombia (2)
- Cuba (1)
- Ecuador (1)
- Ethiopia (1)
- Gabon (1)
- Germany (1)
- Ghana (1)
- Guyana (1)
- Hungary (1)
- Ireland (2)
- Italy (2)
- Jamaica (2)
- Japan (2)
- North Macedonia (1)
- Mexico (1)
- Nigeria (1)
- Philippines (2)
- Poland (2)
- Romania (1)
- Singapore (1)
- Slovenia (1)
- South Africa (2)
- Sweden (1)
- Switzerland (1)
- Trinidad and Tobago (1)
- United Kingdom (1)
- United States (2)
- Uzbekistan (2)
