= Martin Luther King Jr. High School (Georgia) =

Public high school in DeKalb County, Georgia, United States

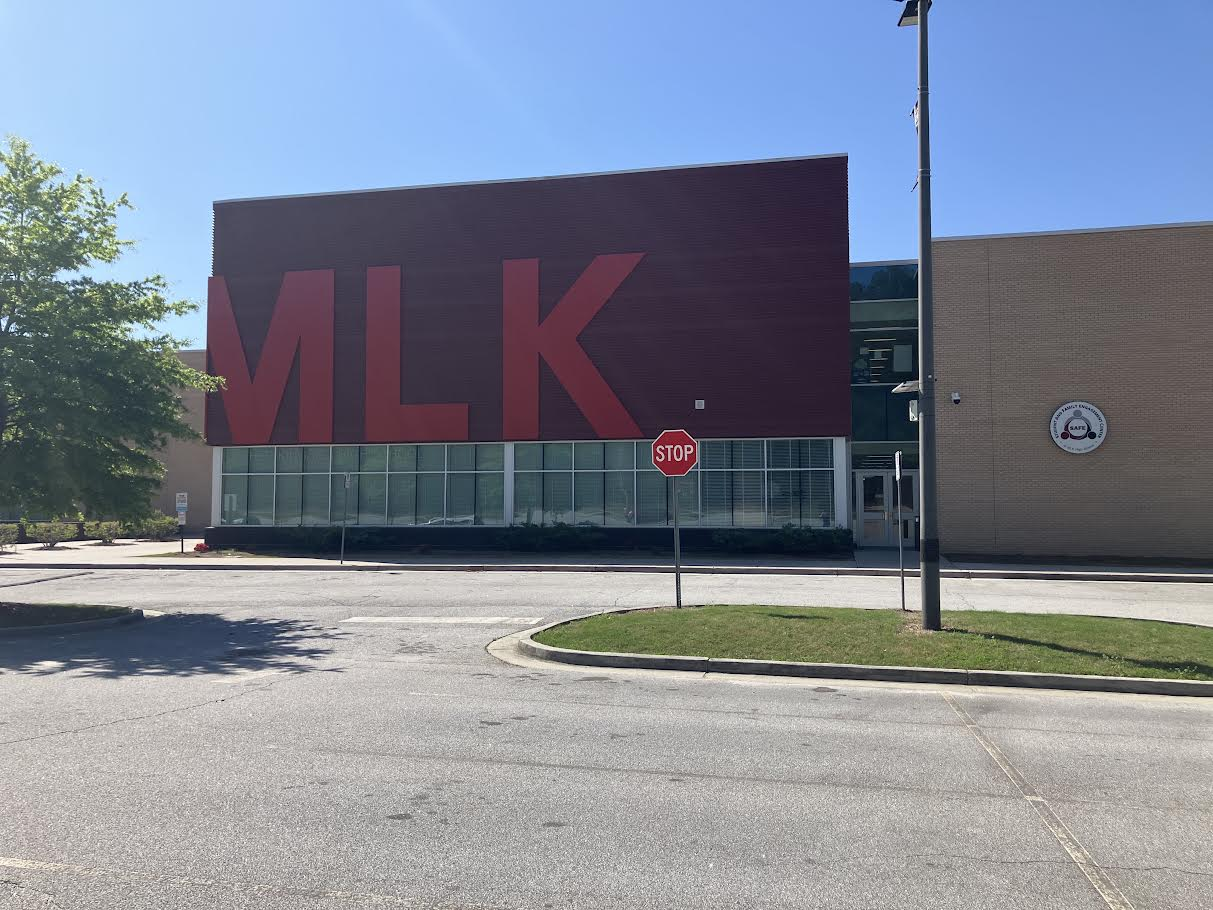
- Front of School, April 2025

Location
- 3991 Snapfinger Road; Lithonia, Georgia; United States; 33°39′37″N 84°11′56″W

Information
- Type: Public secondary
- Motto: Teamwork makes the Dreamwork!
- Established: 2001
- Principal: Ms. Sharon Evans
- Teaching staff: 87.10 (FTE)
- Grades: 9-12
- Enrollment: 1,431 (2023-2024)
- Student to teacher ratio: 16.43
- Colors: Crimson, silver and black
- Mascot: Lion
- Website: MLK High School

Martin Luther King Jr. High School is a public high school located in unincorporated DeKalb County, Georgia, United States, with a Lithonia postal address. It opened in August 2001 as the newest high school in the DeKalb County School System, and was named after the late civil rights leader Martin Luther King Jr.

Its boundary includes a portion of Stonecrest.

== Development ==
The school was opened to alleviate overcrowding in surrounding middle schools. It originally included only grades 6-7 and 9-10. Tenth grade students came from Cedar Grove, Lithonia, and Southwest DeKalb High Schools to relieve crowding and also due to the rezoning of DeKalb County. The following year, after a protest by the high school students, the school dropped the sixth and seventh graders and added eighth grade. It became a pure high school with grades 9-12 in the 2003-2004 school year.

MLK's current principal is Harvey.

== Feeder school ==
Salem Middle School is the middle school feeder to MLK.

== International Baccalaureate Diploma ==
MLK implemented the International Baccalaureate Diploma program during the 2004-2005 school year.

== Notable alumni ==
- Felicia Brown-Edwards, professional sprinter
- Mack Brown, professional football player (Minnesota Vikings)
- Kevin Byard, professional football player (Chicago Bears)
- Crime Mob, southern rap group
- Roland Rivers III, former college football player (Slippery Rock)
- Cedric Hunter, professional baseball player (San Diego Padres)
