= Ariana Washington =

American sprinter

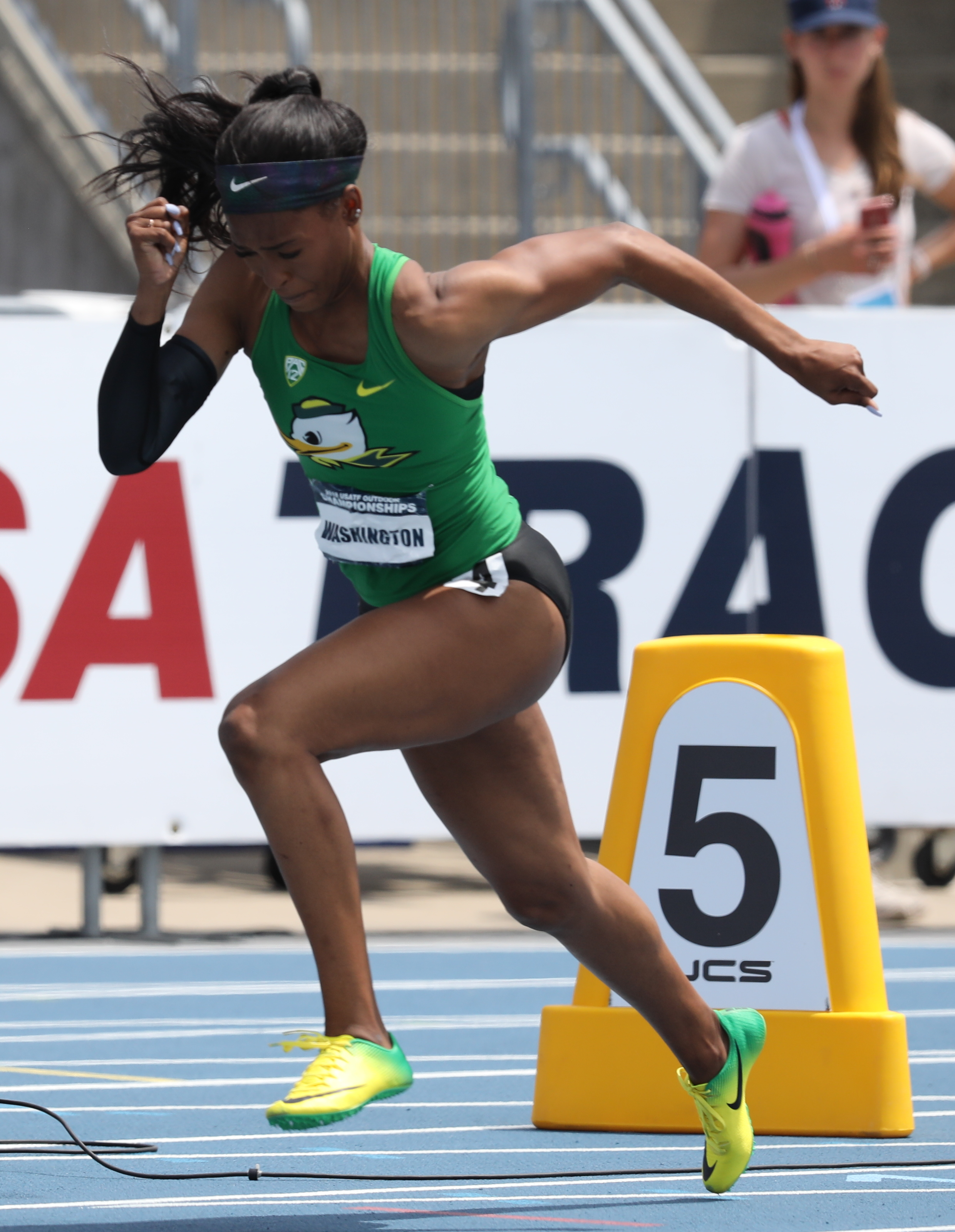
- Washington at the 2018 U.S. Championships

Personal information
- Born: August 27, 1996 (age 29) Signal Hill, California, U.S.
- Height: 5 ft 9 in (175 cm)
- Weight: 135 lb (61 kg)

Sport
- Sport: Athletics
- Event(s): 100 m, 200 m
- College team: Oregon Ducks

Achievements and titles
- Personal best(s): 100 m: 11.01 (Eugene, 2016); 200 m: 22.21 (Eugene, 2016)
Medal record
Women's athletics
Representing the United States
World Championships
Gold medal – first place	2017 London	4 × 100 m relay
World Junior Championships
Gold medal – first place	2014 Oregon	4 × 100 m relay
World Youth Championships
Silver medal – second place	2013 Donetsk	100 m
Bronze medal – third place	2013 Donetsk	200 m

Ariana Washington (born August 27, 1996) is an American sprinter specializing in the 100 m and 200 m. She represented the United States in the 4 × 100 m relay at the 2016 Summer Olympics in Rio de Janeiro, and earned a gold medal at the 2017 World Championships as part of the relay team.

== Early life ==
Ariana Washington was born August 27, 1996, in Signal Hill, California. Washington attended Long Beach Poly High School where she participated in track and field. As a sophomore, her team the Long Beach Poly Jackrabbits won the Penn Relays. Washington won state titles at 100 and 200 meters for her sophomore, junior, and senior years of high school.

== Collegiate athlete ==
In her first year at the University of Oregon, Washington won NCAA titles for 100 meters and 200 meters. She was the first freshman to win both titles.

== Olympian ==
Washington raced in both the 100 and the 200 meter distances at the U.S. Olympic Trials for the 2016 Summer Olympics in Rio de Janeiro, finishing six and fifth respectively. Although she did not qualify as an individual at either distance, she was selected for the United States relay pool in the 4 × 100 m relay. The community of Long Beach, California, raised money to allow Washington's mother and brother to watch her compete in Rio de Janeiro.

== Personal life ==
Washington met fellow Olympian Clayton Murphy over a game of Uno at the USA Track and Field Athletes Lounge in the Olympic Village at the 2016 Summer Olympics in Rio. They got engaged in 2018, and were married in the Napa Valley on December 7, 2019.
