= Irene Ekelund =

Swedish sprinter (born 1997)

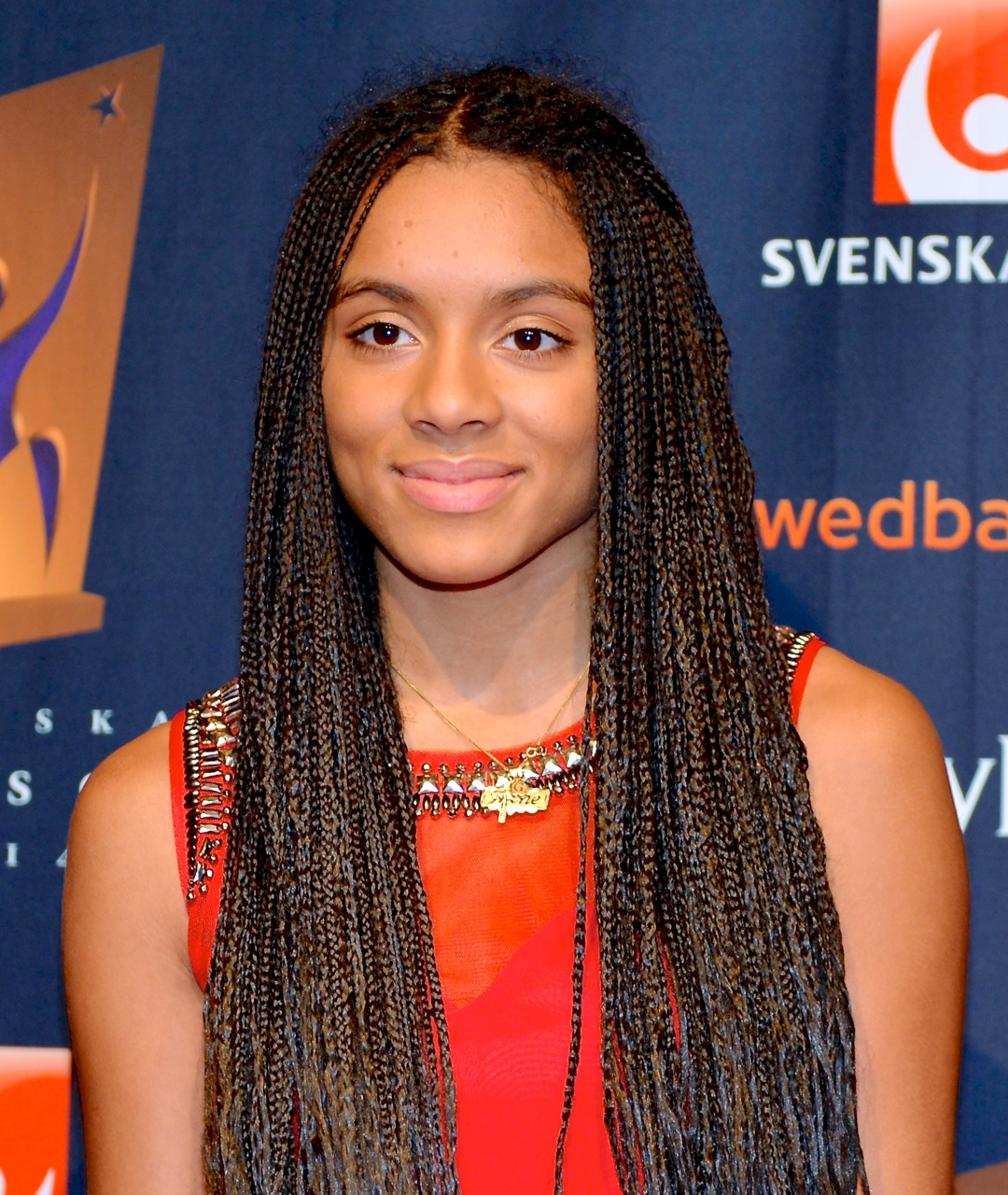
- Irene Ekelund during the Swedish Sports Awards in January 2014

Personal information
- Full name: Irene Michelle Ekelund
- Nationality: Swedish
- Born: 8 March 1997 (age 29) Pakistan

Sport
- Country: Sweden
- Sport: Athletics
- Club: Malmö AI (2013–)
- Coached by: Lasse Eriksson
Medal record
Women's athletics
Representing Sweden
World Junior Championships
Silver medal – second place	2014 Oregon	200 m
World Youth Championships
Gold medal – first place	2013 Donetsk	200 m

Irene Michelle Ekelund (pronounced [ajriːnɪ eːkɛlɵnd]; born 8 March 1997) is a Swedish track and field sprint athlete who competes internationally for Sweden. On 14 July 2013 Ekelund won the gold medal at the World Youth Championships in Donetsk when she finished first in the 200 metres final. It was also the first gold medal for Sweden in a sprint event in a global championship ever.

== Biography ==
Ekelund was born in Pakistan to a Swedish father and an Angolan mother during her father's United Nations-service in Pakistan. The family later moved back to Sweden and settled in Karlstad where she today lives with her mother and five siblings. She currently studies at the stylist program at her high school (gymnasium) in her hometown, and competes for a club in the southern Swedish city of Malmö, Malmö Allmänna Idrottsförening (MAI). Ekelund has several times stated that she is not very interested in athletics, and that she does not have any real idols in the sport.

Ekelund currently holds the Swedish indoor record in 200 metres. At the Swedish National Indoor Championships in Norrköping 2013, Ekelund won gold medals in the distances 60 metres and 200 metres. Her international debut took place in the indoor-international between Sweden, Finland and Norway in Växjö, Sweden at January 20, 2013. Later in 2013 she also made her international championship-debut when she competed in the World Youth Championships in Donetsk, Ukraine. She won the gold medal in 200 metres and finished fifth in the 100 metres final. She became the first Swedish athlete to win an international championship in a sprint event. Thanks to her performance, she was awarded "Newcomer of the Year" at the Swedish Sports Award.

== Achievements ==
Year	Competition	Venue	Position	Event	Notes
2013	World Youth Championships	Donetsk, Ukraine	5th	100 m	11.62
2013	World Youth Championships	Donetsk, Ukraine	1st	200 m	22.92 CR
2014	World Junior Championships	Eugene, United States	6th	100 m	11.61
2014	World Junior Championships	Eugene, United States	2nd	200 m	22.97
2014	European Championships	Zürich, Switzerland	13th (sf)	200 m	23.26
2014	European Championships	Zürich, Switzerland	6th	4 × 100 m relay	44.36
2015	European Indoor Championships	Prague, Czech Republic	19th (sf)	60 m	7.37
2019	European Indoor Championships	Glasgow, United Kingdom	19th (sf)	60 m	7.41

=== Personal bests ===
Track	Event	Time	Venue	Date	Note
Outdoor	100 m	11.35	Kil, Sweden	8 June 2013	NJR
Outdoor	200 m	22.92	Donetsk, Ukraine	14 July 2013	NJR
Indoor	60 m	7.26	Sätra, Sweden	21 February 2015	NJR
Indoor	200 m	23.15	Norrköping, Sweden	17 February 2013	NR
