= Roland Rivers III =

American football player

No. 14
- Position: Quarterback

Personal information
- Born: Ellenwood, Georgia, U.S.
- Listed height: 6 ft 3 in (1.91 m)
- Listed weight: 230 lb (104 kg)

Career information
- High school: Martin Luther King (Lithonia, Georgia)
- College: Valdosta State (2014–2017); Slippery Rock (2018–2019)
- NFL draft: 2020: undrafted

Career history
- Pittsburgh Maulers (2022); Albany Empire (2023)

Awards and highlights
- Harlon Hill Trophy (2019); 2× First-team All-PSAC West (2018, 2019)

Career USFL statistics
- Pass attempts: 64
- Pass completions: 32
- Passing yards: 366
- Passing touchdowns: 2
- Interceptions: 1

Roland Rivers III is an American former professional football quarterback. He played college football at Valdosta State and Slippery Rock and was the 2019 winner of the Harlon Hill Trophy. He played for the Pittsburgh Maulers of the United States Football League (USFL) in 2022.

== Early life and education ==
Rivers was born in Ellenwood, Georgia, and grew up in Atlanta. He was a fan of Michael Vick growing up, which motivated him to join a local Pop Warner football team in fifth grade. He originally played on the line, being "always a bigger kid," but started playing quarterback when 12 years old after seeing Ben Roethlisberger. He attended Tri-Cities High School in East Point, Georgia, for two years before transferring to Martin Luther King High School. At Tri-Cities, he played quarterback on the junior varsity team and tight end on the varsity. He played most of his junior season (at Martin Luther King) as a backup quarterback, seeing time as a starter when the main player at the position was injured. Rivers gained the starting position as a senior, and led his team to a 7–4 record and a playoff berth, throwing for 2,685 yards and 24 touchdowns. He was an honorable mention all-state selection, as Martin Luther King ultimately lost in the playoffs to Gainesville, who were led by Deshaun Watson. At Martin Luther King, Rivers also competed in swimming and track.

Although Rivers received several offers from Division I-AA schools, he decided to accept an offer from Division II Valdosta State. He redshirted as a freshman in 2014. He was a member of the scout team that year. As a redshirt-freshman in 2015, Rivers shared the starting quarterback position with E. J. Hilliard, helping lead the team to a 9–3 record while throwing for 548 yards and six touchdowns.

Head coach David Dean and quarterbacks coach Justin Roper both left following the 2015 season, and the former was replaced by Kerwin Bell; Bell instituted his NFL-style offense, which "effectively tapped into Rivers' true potential," according to Pro Football Network. Rivers won the starting job and helped lead Valdosta State to a 6–1 start. However, in week eight, he suffered a torn labrum, which ended his season. He finished his 2016 campaign with 1,312 passing yards and 13 touchdowns, as well as 99 rush attempts for 301 yards and three touchdowns. He underwent surgery to repair his labrum in March 2017 and missed the entire 2017 season as a result.

After fully recovering from his injury in early 2018, Rivers decided to transfer to Slippery Rock, where his quarterbacks coach from 2015, Justin Roper had gone. He had joined the team shortly before the season started, and as a result, was named third-string quarterback due to questions of whether he knew the offense. After injuries to starter Andrew Koester and backup Taylor King, Rivers was named starting quarterback for week three against Millersville. After good performance in his first few games, he remained the starter for the rest of the season, helping lead the team to an 11–3 record while throwing for 2,721 yards and 28 touchdowns. Rivers earned first-team All-Pennsylvania State Athletic Conference (PSAC) honors and helped Slippery Rock advance to the second round of the playoffs, where they lost to Notre Dame.

Rivers decided to return to Slippery Rock for his senior season rather than declare for the 2019 NFL draft. He was not allowed to be on a scholarship, due to being only a part-time student, and was not allowed to watch film or train with teammates. When unable to participate in team practices, he trained by himself to prepare for the season. Roper left that season for Northern Iowa, and Adam Neugebauer became the quarterbacks coach. Neugebauer brought an innovative system which ran solely through the quarterback, similar to what Rivers had been under at Valdosta State in 2016. Rivers had his best season in 2019, leading Slippery Rock to a 13–1 record while throwing for 4,460 yards and 52 touchdowns. Additionally, he recorded 700 rushing yards and nine scores on the ground. Rivers helped the school advance to the semifinals of the Division II playoffs, which was the farthest they had gone since 1998.

After the season ended, Rivers was given numerous accolades. He was named the Don Hansen National Player of the Year, a first-team Division II All-American by Associated Press (AP), Brian Westbrook Regional Player of the Year, and was awarded the Harlon Hill Trophy, given to the best player in Division II. He became the first winner of the award from Slippery Rock in history, as well as the first winner from the PSAC west division. In just 26 games across two seasons at Slippery Rock, Rivers had set several team records, including: most passing touchdowns (80), most total yards of offense per game (326.1), highest completion percentage (63.3), and best passing efficiency (164.1). He finished his collegiate career with 686 passes completed on 1,107 attempts, 9,041 yards and 99 total touchdowns thrown. He also ran for 1,723 yards on 434 attempts and scored 20 touchdowns.

== Professional career ==
Rivers went unselected in the 2020 NFL draft. Due to the COVID-19 pandemic, he did not receive the opportunity to tryout with any team during the season. He finally received a chance in March 2021, being selected to attend CAMP by Hub Football, where players could show their talents to NFL coaches. Afterwards, he received an invite to the rookie camp of the Pittsburgh Steelers, but did not sign.

=== Pittsburgh Maulers ===
In May 2022, Rivers was signed by the Pittsburgh Maulers of the United States Football League (USFL), who had compiled a 1–5 record by this point. He started in the seventh game of the season, completing 18 of 38 passes for 218 yards and one touchdown in a loss to the New Jersey Generals. He appeared in three other games as a backup, finishing the season with four games played, 32 completions out of 64 attempts, and 366 passing yards along with two touchdowns and an interception. He was released after the season on January 2, 2023.

=== Albany Empire ===
On May 5, 2023, Rivers signed with the Albany Empire of the National Arena League (NAL). Two days later, Rivers was released by the Empire.

== Career statistics ==
=== USFL ===
| Season | Team | Games | | | Passing | | | | | | Rushing | | | |
| Season | Team | GP | GS | Record | Comp | Att | Yards | Pct | TD | Int | Att | Yds | Avg | TD |
|---|---|---|---|---|---|---|---|---|---|---|---|---|---|---|
| 2022 | PIT | 4 | 1 | 0–1 | 32 | 64 | 366 | 50.0 | 2 | 1 | 7 | 46 | 6.6 | 1 |
| Career | | 4 | 1 | 0–1 | 32 | 64 | 366 | 50.0 | 2 | 1 | 7 | 46 | 6.6 | 1 |

=== College ===
| Season | Games | | | Passing | | | | | | Rushing | | | |
| Season | GP | GS | Record | Comp | Att | Yards | Pct | TD | Int | Att | Yds | Avg | TD |
|---|---|---|---|---|---|---|---|---|---|---|---|---|---|
| 2015 | 10 | – | 9–3 | 43 | 67 | 548 | 64.2 | 6 | 2 | 34 | 125 | 3.7 | 1 |
| 2016 | 8 | – | 8–3 | 123 | 218 | 1,312 | 56.4 | 13 | 8 | 99 | 301 | 3.0 | 3 |
| 2017 | 0 | – | 5–4 | 0 | 0 | 0 | 0 | 0 | 0 | 0 | 0 | 0.0 | 0 |
| 2018 | 12 | – | 11–3 | 198 | 341 | 2,721 | 58.1 | 28 | 12 | 137 | 597 | 4.4 | 7 |
| 2019 | 14 | – | 13–1 | 322 | 481 | 4,460 | 66.9 | 52 | 7 | 164 | 700 | 4.3 | 9 |
| Career | 44 | – | 46–14 | 686 | 1,107 | 9,041 | 61.9 | 99 | 29 | 434 | 1,723 | 3.9 | 20 |
