= Felicia Brown-Edwards =

American sprinter (born 1993)

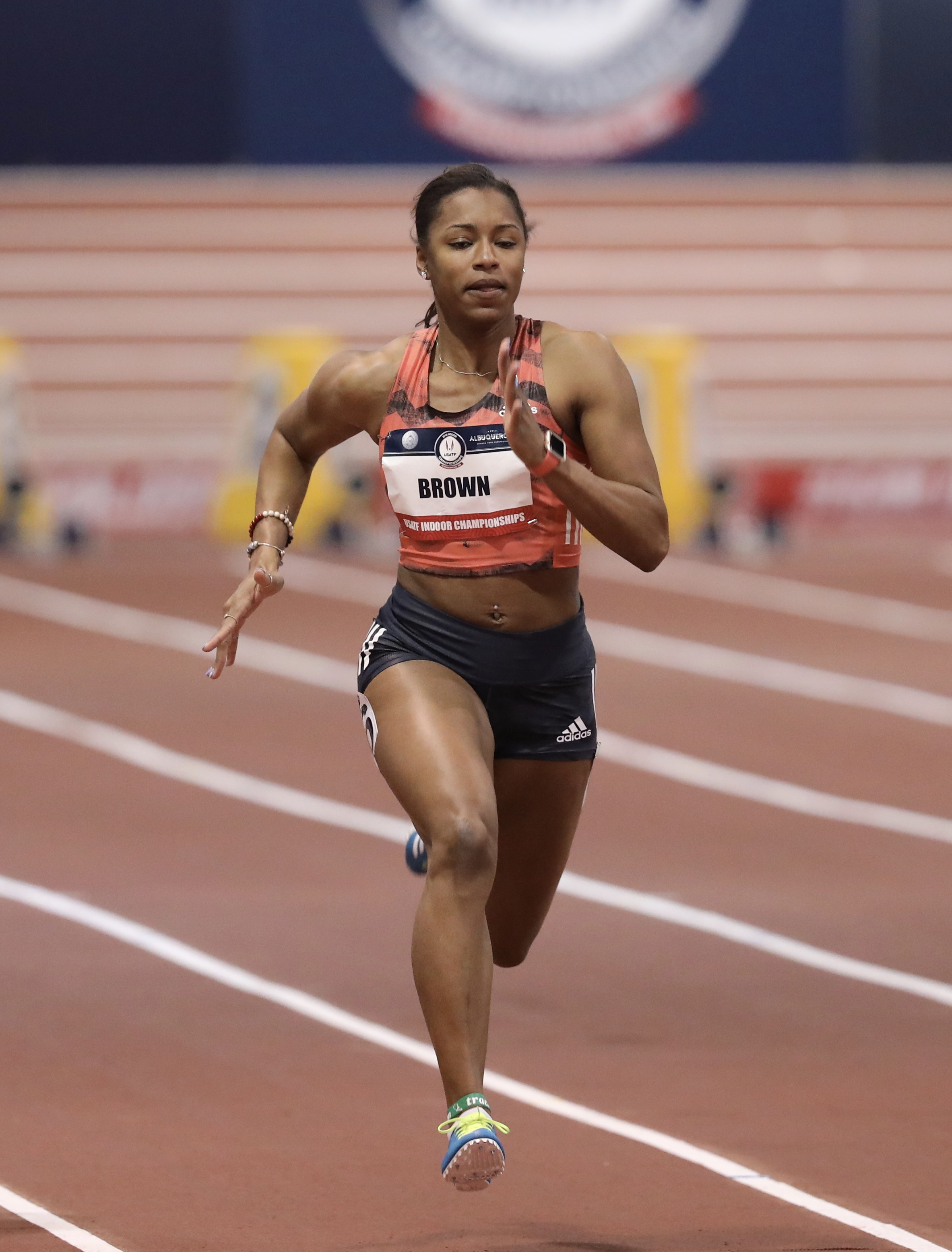
- Brown-Edwards at the 2018 USA Indoor Track and Field Championships, where she finished 4th in the 60 m

Personal information
- Nationality: United States
- Born: Felicia Brown; 27 October 1993 (age 32)
- Home town: Lithonia, Georgia
- Height: 168 cm (5 ft 6 in)
- Weight: 57 kg (126 lb)
- Spouse: Wesley Edwards

Sport
- Sport: Athletics
- Event: 200 metres
- College team: Tennessee Volunteers
- Turned pro: 2016
- Now coaching: South Carolina Gamecocks

Achievements and titles
- Personal bests: 200m: • 22.26 (−1.3) (2016); • Indoor: 22.45 (2016)
Medal record
Women's athletics
Representing United States
World Relays
Bronze medal – third place	2017 Bahamas	4 × 200 m

Felicia Brown-Edwards (born 27 October 1993), also known as Felicia Brown or Felicia Edwards, is an American sprinter. She was the bronze medalist in the 2017 World Relays women's 4 × 200 m. As of 2023, she holds top 20 all-time marks in the indoor 200 metres (22.45), 200 metres straight (23.31), and the 4 × 200 metres relay (1:29.86).

== Biography ==
Brown-Edwards was raised in Lithonia, Georgia where she attended Martin Luther King Jr. High School. She was the 2011 AAU Junior Olympic Games 400 metres champion and helped her team to a Georgia state title the same year.

Competing for the Tennessee Volunteers women's track and field team in the NCAA, Brown-Edwards set school records for both the indoor and outdoor 200 metres and qualified for the NCAA national championships four times outdoors and two times indoors. In 2016, Brown-Edwards ran the third-fastest indoor 200 m time in NCAA history and won that event at the 2016 NCAA Division I Indoor Track and Field Championships. She was a member of Christian sports organization Athletes in Action and credited her Christian faith for helping her win.

After graduation in 2016, Brown-Edwards started a professional career, sponsored by Adidas from 2016 to 2019. She finished 4th in the 60 metres at the 2018 USA Indoor Track and Field Championships.

Brown-Edwards is currently an assistant sprints coach for the South Carolina Gamecocks track and field team in Columbia, South Carolina.

== Statistics ==
=== Personal bests ===
Event	Mark	Competition	Venue	Date
200 metres	22.26 (−1.3 m/s)	Southeastern Conference Championships	Tuscaloosa, Alabama	14 May 2016
200 metres (indoor)	22.45	Southeastern Conference Indoor Championships	Fayetteville, Arkansas	27 February 2016
