= Steve Francis (disambiguation) =

Steve Francis (born 1977) is a retired American basketball player.

Steve or Stephen Francis is the name of:

- Steve Francis (footballer) (born 1964), English football goalkeeper
- Steve Francis (businessman) (born 1954), American businessman and politician
- Steven Francis, musician in Delusion Squared
- Stephen Francis, convicted of murder in the Gold Bars triple murders
