= Delusion Squared =

French progressive rock band

- Origin: France
- Genres: Progressive rock
- Years active: 2009–present
- Members: Steven Francis; Emmanuel de Saint Méen
- Past members: Lorraine Young
- Website: delusionsquared.com

Delusion Squared is a progressive rock band from France. The band was created in 2009 by Steven Francis, Emmanuel de Saint Méen and Lorraine Young, and released its eponymous debut album in September 2010. Young left the band in 2017 to pursue her own projects.

Their music can be classified to be close to a female fronted Porcupine Tree. It has received considerable attention from its release, with notable reviews from Ravenheart Music, Strutter'zine, Music Street Journal, and is also "album of the month" at newears.org. These reviews compare Delusion Squared's music to Porcupine Tree but also to Anathema, The Pineapple Thief, Ayreon, Phideaux.

Their debut work is a concept-album unraveling a dark sci-fi story in which a young girl, who was born in a post nuclear techno society, revolts against her condition (and the AI supremacy) and decides to give birth to a natural child. Due to copyright laws which extend to modified genes, she is found guilty of "gene piracy" and abandoned on the polluted outside. There she meets survivors, and becomes a spiritual guide to them, eventually starting a new religion. The CD release is a dual sleeve digipack sporting a synopsis of the story. A digital release is also available.

The second album, simply titled II, is a continuation of the story, where the heroine somehow comes back to fight the followers of this religion which became perverted. The CD release is a triple sleeve digipack with a leaflet. A digital release is also available.

The third album is titled The Final Delusion. It is about a young girl having prescience gifts and being abducted by a military power and administered experimental drugs to boost her gift and obtain strategic information, be it at the price of her sanity. The CD release is a triple sleeve digipack with a leaflet. A digital release is also available.

The first three albums together provide a complete if obscure story, making them a "concept trilogy"

The fourth album, Anthropocene, has lead vocals sung by Steven Francis. It is not a concept album per se but rather a collection of depictions of possible futures for humankind. The CD release is a digisleeve. A digital release is also available.

All albums are self-releases, with no evidence that the band tries to get signed to a record label. There is no evidence that the band has ever played live or will be going to.

== Discography ==
- Delusion Squared (self-released, 2010)
- Delusion Squared II (self-released, 2012)
- The Final Delusion (self-released, 2014)
- Anthropocene (self-released, 2018)

== Personnel ==
- Lorraine Young: Guitars, Vocals
- Steven Francis: Guitars, Vocals, Drums, Keyboards
- Emmanuel de Saint Méen: Bass, Keyboards, Backing vocals
