= Letícia de Souza =

Brazilian sprinter

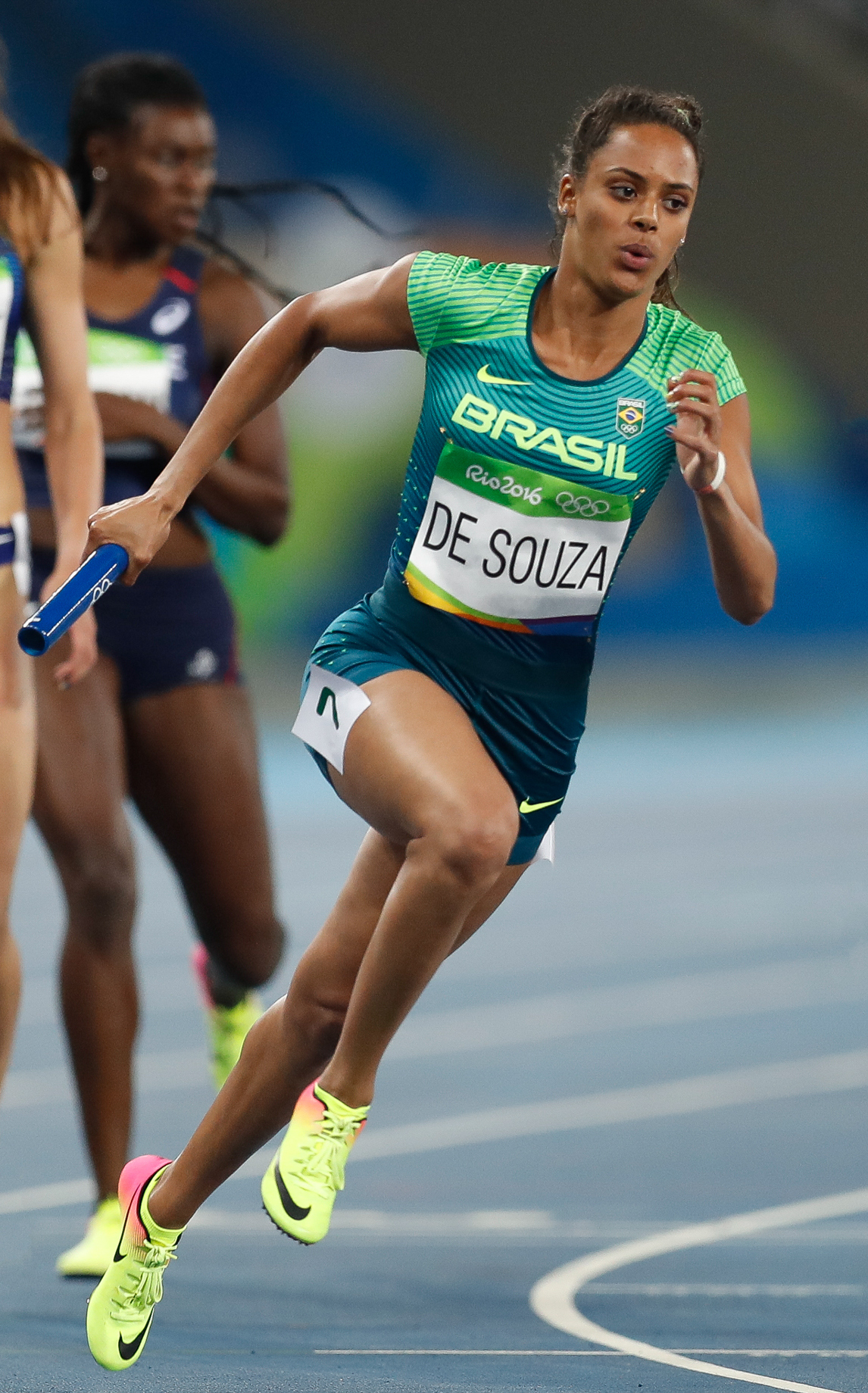
- De Souza at the 2016 Olympics

Personal information
- Born: 6 May 1996 (age 30) São Paulo, Brazil
- Education: Baylor University
- Height: 165 cm (5 ft 5 in)
- Weight: 49 kg (108 lb)

Sport
- Sport: Athletics
- Event: 100–400 m

Achievements and titles
- Personal bests: 100 m – 11.84 (2013); 200 m – 23.98 (2013); 400 m – 52.64 (2016)

Leticia Cherpe de Souza (born 6 May 1996) is a Brazilian sprinter. She competed in the 4 × 400 m relay at the 2016 Olympics.
