= Angel Piccirillo =

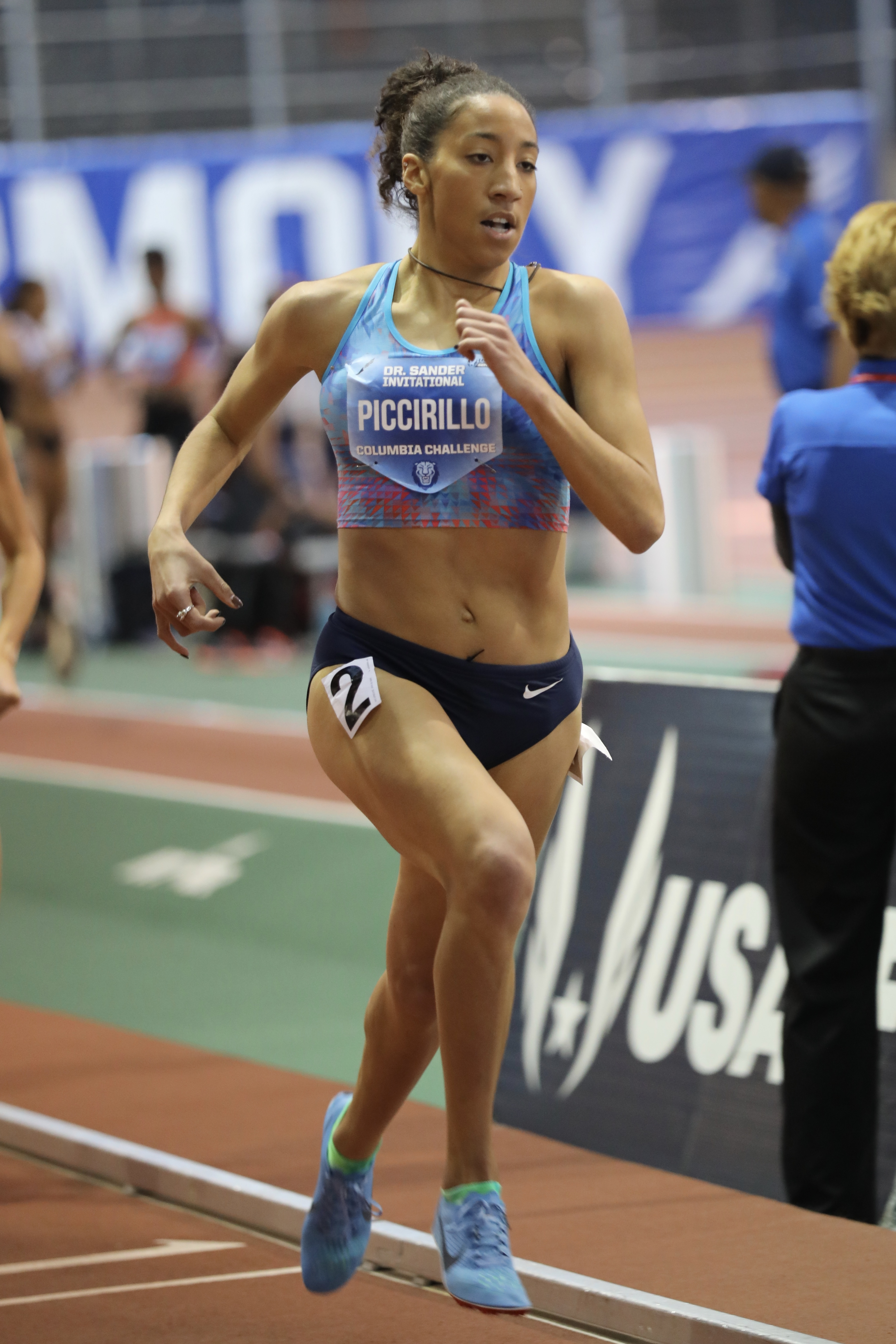
- Piccirillo competing in 2019

Personal information
- Born: January 8, 1994 (age 32) Homer City, Pennsylvania, U.S.
- Height: 5 ft 9 in (1.75 m)
- Spouse: Patrick Tiernan
- Website: Website

Sport
- Country: United States
- Sport: Track and field
- Event(s): 800 metres, 1500 metres, Mile
- College team: Villanova Wildcats track and field
- Club: Juventus Track Club; 2017-2020; Oiselle Little Wing Athletics; 2020-21; Oregon Track Club; 2021-Present
- Turned pro: 2017
- Coached by: Derek Thompson; 2017-20; Lauren Fleshman; 2020-21; Mark Rowland; 2021-Present

Achievements and titles
- Personal best(s): 800 meters: 2:01.51; 1500 meters: 4:10.86; Mile: 4:30.65

Angel Piccirillo (born January 8, 1994) is a middle-distance track runner and multiple time NCAA Division I All-American in cross country and Track.

== High school career ==
Piccirillo placed 6th in the high school mile at 2010 Millrose Games in 4:59.38.

As a junior at Homer-Center Junior/Senior High School, Piccirillo placed 13th in Foot Locker Cross Country Championships in 17:47.

As a senior, Piccirillo placed 32nd in Foot Locker Cross Country Championships in 18:34.

As a senior in 2012, Piccirillo set a PIAA 1600 meter record in 4:39.42. Piccirillo placed 2nd in the mile in 4:45.05 at 2012 New Balance HS Indoor Nationals behind Hannah Meier of Grosse Pointe South High School.

== College career ==
In 2017, Women's 4 x 800 metres relay World Leading representing the United States and Villanova University at 2017 Penn Relays - (Kelsey Margey, Stephanie Schappert, Siofra Buttner, Angel Piccirillo) won in 8:26.36.

Piccirillo won her 8th Penn Relays wheel in 2017 which is the most among collegian athletic career.

Piccirillo placed 20th at 2016 NCAA Division I Cross Country Championships to earn All-America honors. Piccirillo won the individual title at the 2016 Big East Conference Championship in cross country.

Piccirillo placed 2nd in mile at 2016 NCAA Division I Indoor Track and Field Championships in 4:36.26 behind Kaela Edwards of Oklahoma State University. Piccirillo ran 9:25.12 to place 13th in the 3000 meters at 2016 NCAA Division I Indoor Track and Field Championships.

Piccirillo placed 14th in 1500 meters at 2015 NCAA Division I Outdoor Track and Field Championships in 4:19.13.

Piccirillo, Michaela Wilkins, Nicky Akande, and Emily Lipari placed 2nd in Distance Medley Relay at 2013 NCAA Division I Indoor Track and Field Championships in 10:57.96 behind Rebecca Addison, Maya Long, Jillian Smith, Amanda Eccleston of University of Michigan.

== Professional career ==
=== Competition record ===
Year	Competition	Venue	Position	Event	Notes
Representing United States
2017	Millrose Games	New York City, United States	7th	3000m	9:10.65(i)
2010	Millrose Games	New York City, United States	6th	Mile	4:59.38(i)

Year	Competition	Venue	Position	Event	Notes
Representing Villanova Wildcats women's track and field
2015	USA Outdoor Track and Field Championships	Eugene, United States	30th	800 meters	2:08.44
2017	USA Outdoor Track and Field Championships	Sacramento, United States	13th	1500 meters	4:13.40
Representing Oiselle Little Wing Athletics
2021	United States Olympic trials	Eugene, United States	40th	800 meters	2:06.95
Representing Oregon Track Club
2022	USA Outdoor Track and Field Championships	Eugene, United States	15th	800 meters	2:03.70

As a sophomore at Villanova University, Piccirillo placed 30th in 800 meters at the 2015 USA Outdoor Track and Field Championships in 2:08.44.

Piccirillo placed 13th in 1500 meters at the 2017 USA Outdoor Track and Field Championships in 4:13.40.

While training with Juventus, Piccirillo won the mile at 2018 Villanova Invitational and raced the 1500 meters at 2018 Florida Relays in a time of 4:15.94.
