= Shannon Hylton =

English sprinter

Personal information
- Born: 19 December 1996 (age 28)
- Height: 1.75 m (5 ft 9 in)
- Weight: 62 kg (137 lb)

Sport
- Sport: Athletics
- Event(s): 100 m, 200 m
- Coached by: John Blackie (2011-2016); Ryan Freckleton (2016-2018) John Blackie (2018-)

Shannon Hylton (born 19 December 1996) is an English sprinter. She represented Great Britain and Northern Ireland at the 2017 World Championships. She narrowly missed qualifying for the semifinals.

Hylton qualified for the World Championships as the British 200m champion. She took the title at the British Athletics Team Trials in July 2017, with a time of 22.94. She also won gold in the 2015 British Indoor Athletics Championships, and took gold as part of the 4 x 100m relay team at the European Junior Championships in Sweden in 2015, and also as part of the 4 x 100m relay team at the 2018 Athletics World Cup. Shannon's personal best over 200m is 22.78.

Her twin sister Cheriece Hylton is also a sprinter.

== Early life and education ==
Hylton grew up in Chislehurst, London, England and attended Bullers Wood School for Girls in Chislehurst, where she took A Levels in biology, chemistry and economics.

Hylton studied Biomedical Science at the University of East London, graduating with a first-class honours. During her studies, she was published in the American Journal of Transplantation and regularly participated in debating groups focusing on women's empowerment and equal opportunities for women.

Hylton came from a background of dance and netball, but was inspired to take up running after seeing Katrina Johnson-Thompson at the 2012 London Olympics.

== Career ==
Hylton is a member of Blackheath and Bromley Harriers Athletic Club and is coached by John Blackie who is also coach to Dina Asher-Smith. Previously she was coached by Ryan Freckleton.

In 2013, she came 6th at the World Youth Championships, in 2014, she came 4th at the World Junior Championships and then in 2015, she became European Junior Championships silver medallist. In 2015, she also won gold in the 2015 British Indoor Athletics Championships with a time of 23.69, beating her sister into second place, and was part of the gold medal-winning 4 x 100m relay team at the European Junior Championships in Sweden.

Hylton was injured in 2016 and took time off to recuperate.

In July 2017, she returned to the sport, running a lifetime best time at the British Athletics Team Trials at the Alexander Stadium in Birmingham of 22.94 seconds, beating Bianca Williams who took the runner-up spot in 23.05 seconds.

Hylton was crowned British champion, qualifying for the 2017 World Championships which took place at the Olympic Stadium in London. She was also selected for the 4x100m relay squad alongside Blackheath and Bromley teammate, Dina Asher-Smith, Desiree Henry, Daryll Neita, Asha Philip and fellow UEL students, Corinne Humphreys and Bianca Williams.

Hylton ran a time of 23.39 in her heat at the World Championships, which meant she narrowly missed out on a place in the semi-finals.

Hylton is a British Athletics Power of 10 athlete. Hylton, along with her sister Cheriece, has been selected to be represented by Andy Murray's management agency, 77 Sports Management. She is sponsored by Under Armour.

=== 2018 Season ===
Hylton finished first in the 100m at the Bedford U23 Championships, improving her personal best to 11.44.

Hylton was narrowly pipped to fourth position in the 200m at the Muller British Athletics Championships in Birmingham by one thousandth of a second. During this competition she recorded a new personal best of 22.78.

During the inaugural London Athletics World Cup, Hylton was part of the winning 4 x 100m relay with teammates Asha Philip, Bianca Williams and Imani Lansiquot, running a time of 42.52. This victory helped secure Britain a third place at the Championships.

== International competitions ==
Year	Competition	Venue	Position	Event	Notes
Representing Great Britain and England
2013	World Youth Championships	Donetsk, Ukraine	6th	200 m	23.64
2014	World Junior Championships	Eugene, United States	4th	200 m	23.25 (w)
2015	European Junior Championships	Eskilstuna, Sweden	2nd	200 m	22.73
2015	European Junior Championships	Eskilstuna, Sweden	1st	4 × 100 m relay	44.18
2017	World Championships	London, United Kingdom	23rd (h)	200 m	23.39
2018	Athletics World Cup	London, United Kingdom	1st	4 x 100 m relay	42.52

== Personal bests ==
Outdoor

- 100 metres - 11.44 (+0.3 m/s, Bedford 2018)
- 200 metres - 22.73 (+2.0 m/s, Eskilstuna 2015)

Indoor

- 60 metres - 7.37 (Sheffield 2017)
- 200 metres - 23.24 (Sheffield 2014)

== Other Activities ==
Hylton is an ambassador for She's the First, a non-profit organisation working for the education and advocacy of women.
