= Kayelle Clarke =

Trinidad and Tobago athlete

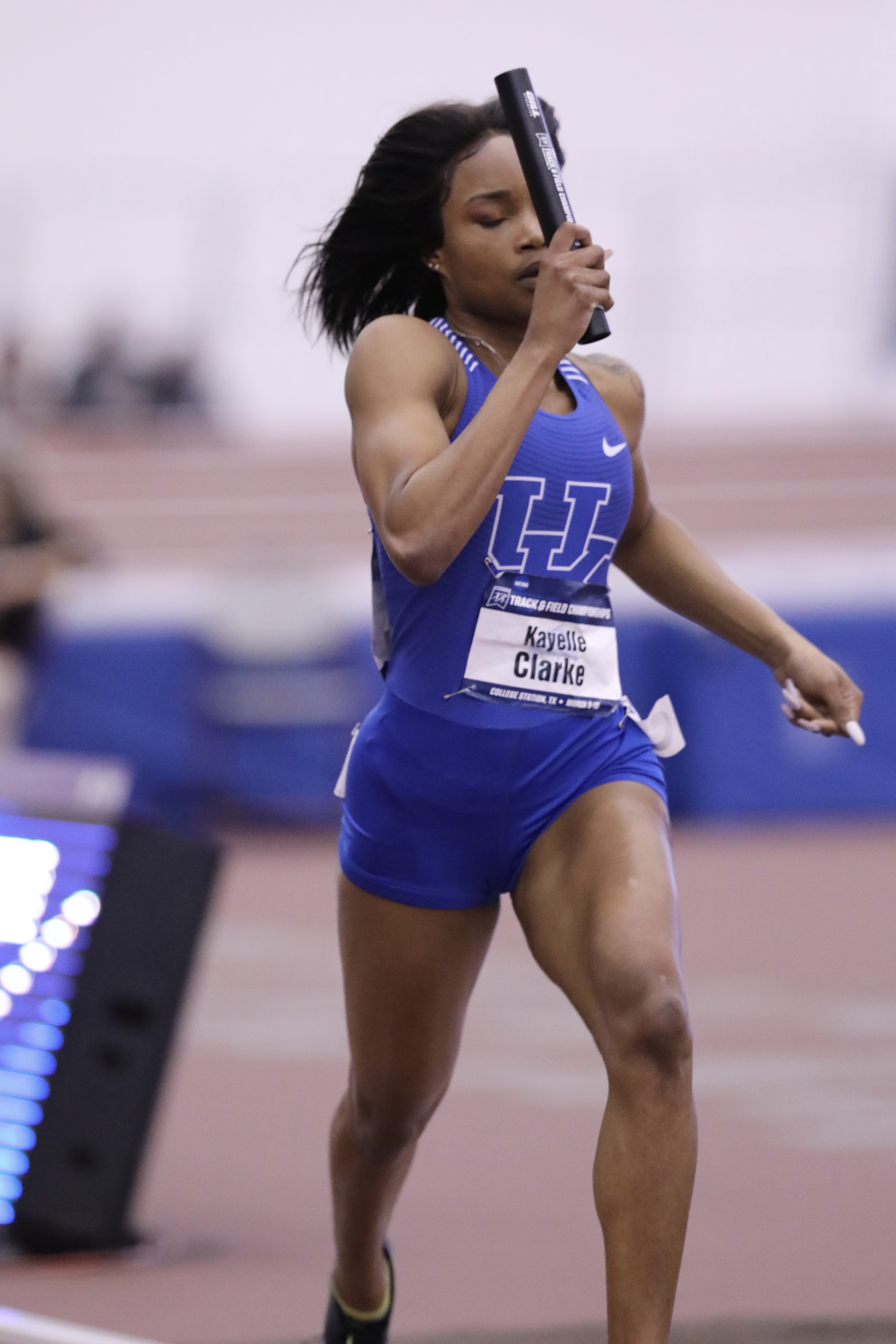
- in 2018

Personal information
- Born: 28 February 1996 (age 30) La Brea, Trinidad and Tobago
- Education: New Mexico Junior College; University of Kentucky

Sport
- Sport: Athletics
- Event: 200 metres
- College team: Kentucky Wildcats

Kayelle Rhealin Clarke (born 28 February 1996) is a sprinter from Trinidad and Tobago. She represented her country at the 2017 World Championships without advancing from the first round.

== International competitions ==
Year	Competition	Venue	Position	Event	Notes
Representing Trinidad and Tobago
2011	CARIFTA Games (U17)	Montego Bay, Jamaica	8th (h)	200 m	24.69
2011	CARIFTA Games (U17)	Montego Bay, Jamaica	3rd	4 × 100 m relay	47.37
2012	Central American and Caribbean; Junior Championships (U18)	San Salvador, El Salvador	5th	200 m	24.78
2012	Central American and Caribbean; Junior Championships (U18)	San Salvador, El Salvador	3rd	4 × 100 m relay	46.24
2013	CARIFTA Games (U20)	Nassau, Bahamas	3rd	4 × 100 m relay	45.71
2013	World Youth Championships	Donetsk, Ukraine	37th (h)	100 m	12.40
2013	World Youth Championships	Donetsk, Ukraine	14th (sf)	200 m	24.54
2014	CARIFTA Games (U20)	Fort-de-France, Martinique	5th	100 m	11.51 (w)
2014	CARIFTA Games (U20)	Fort-de-France, Martinique	1st	200 m	23.10 (w)
2014	CARIFTA Games (U20)	Fort-de-France, Martinique	2nd	4 × 100 m relay	45.32
2014	Central American and Caribbean; Junior Championships (U20)	Morelia, Mexico	3rd	200 m	23.71
2014	Central American and Caribbean; Junior Championships (U20)	Morelia, Mexico	1st	4 × 100 m relay	44.24
2014	World Junior Championships	Eugene, United States	9th (sf)	200 m	23.76
2014	World Junior Championships	Eugene, United States	4th	4 × 100 m relay	44.75
2015	CARIFTA Games (U20)	Basseterre, Saint Kitts and Nevis	4th	100 m	11.75
2015	CARIFTA Games (U20)	Basseterre, Saint Kitts and Nevis	1st	200 m	23.12 (w)
2015	CARIFTA Games (U20)	Basseterre, Saint Kitts and Nevis	3rd	4 × 100 m relay	47.64
2015	CARIFTA Games (U20)	Basseterre, Saint Kitts and Nevis	3rd	4 × 400 m relay	3:47.55
2015	Pan American Junior Championships	Edmonton, Canada	15th (h)	100 m	11.90 (w)
2015	Pan American Junior Championships	Edmonton, Canada	–	200 m	DNF
2017	World Championships	London, United Kingdom	35th (h)	200 m	23.75
2018	Central American and Caribbean Games	Barranquilla, Colombia	5th	200 m	23.54

== Personal bests ==
Outdoor

- 100 metres – 11.31 (+0.9 m/s, Port-of-Spain 2017)
- 200 metres – 22.97 (0.0 m/s, Port-of-Spain 2017)
- 400 metres – 56.47 (Canyon 2015)

Indoor

- 60 metres – 7.67 (Fayetteville 2017)
- 200 metres – 23.86 (Albuquerque 2015)
- 400 metres – 57.36 (Albuquerque 2016)
