= Hannah Cunliffe =

American athlete

Personal information
- Nationality: American, naturalized Italian
- Born: 9 January 1996 (age 29)

Sport
- Sport: Track and Field
- Event(s): 60m, 100m, 200m

Hannah Cunliffe (born January 9, 1996) is an American athlete.

A former student at the University of Oregon she was the 2017 indoor National Champion and the NCAA record holder in the 60 meters but also had injury problems that prevented her from competing in the outdoors events at her best. In 2019, a concussion sustained in a car accident again forced Cunliffe to end her outdoor season early.

On July 4, 2020 Cunliffe ran 100 metres in 11.14 seconds at the Montverde Academy, Montverde, Florida. This placed her 8th on the year list worldwide for 2020.
