= 2003 Central American and Caribbean Age Group Championships in Athletics =

Competition held in Caguas, Puerto Rico

X Central American and Caribbean Age Group Championships
- Dates: 18–19 July
- Host city: Caguas, Puerto Rico
- Venue: Turabo University Track
- Level: Age Group 11–14 years
- Participation: 74 athletes from 12 nations

The 10th Central American and Caribbean Age Group Championships in Athletics (Spanish: Campeonato Centroamericano y del Caribe Infantil de Pruebas Combinadas), were hosted by the Puerto Rican Athletics Federation (FAPUR), and were held at the Turabo University track in Caguas, Puerto Rico, on July 18–19, 2003.

== Participation ==
The competition results are published. The participation of 74 athletes (40 boys and 34 girls) from 12 countries was reported.

- Aruba (8)
- Bahamas (8)
- British Virgin Islands (8)
- Cayman Islands (8)
- Costa Rica (2)
- Dominica (2)
- Dominican Republic (8)
- Mexico (5)
- Netherlands Antilles (8)
- Puerto Rico (8)
- Saint Lucia (6)
- Saint Vincent and the Grenadines (3)

== Medal summary ==
| Event | Gold | | Silver | | Bronze | |
Boys 13–14
| 80 metres | Edwin Vargas (PUR) | 9.90 (wind: -2.6 m/s) | Rosario Willi (VIN) | 10.00 (wind: -1.8 m/s) | Sean Troop (CAY) | 10.05 (wind: -1.8 m/s) |
| 80 metres hurdles | Edwin Vargas (PUR) | 12.90 (wind: -3.2 m/s) | Darion Duncombe (BAH) | 13:20 (wind: -3.7 m/s) | Tayron Reyes (DOM); Alfredo Ortiz (PUR); Jean Claude D (LCA) | 13:40 (wind: -3.7 m/s); 13:40 (wind: -3.4 m/s); 13:40 (wind: -3.7 m/s) |
| 1200 metres | Terrence Agard (AHO) | 3:37.81 | Rigmar Adamus (AHO) | 3:44.20 | Adrian Bondel (LCA) | 3:45.36 |
| Long jump | Edwin Vargas (PUR) | 5.46m | Terrence Agard (AHO) | 5.41m | Tayron Reyes (DOM) | 5.37m |
| High jump | Roland Pinder (BAH) | 1.55m | Tayron Reyes (DOM); Alfredo Ortiz (PUR); Edwin Vargas (PUR) | 1.50m | | |
| Shot put | Brian Thiel (ARU) | 11.22m | Rigmar Adamus (AHO) | 11.18m | Edwin Vargas (PUR) | 10:98m |
| Hexathlon | Edwin Vargas (PUR) | 3717 | Rigmar Adamus (AHO) | 3663 | Terrence Agard (AHO) | 3600 |
Girls 13–14
| 80 metres | Mihalia Maria (AHO) | 10:07 (wind: -1.9 m/s) | Maricel Cruz (PUR) | 10:37 (wind: -2.9 m/s) | Diona Marten (AHO) | 10:43 (wind: -2.9 m/s) |
| 60 metres hurdles | Brittany Munnings (BAH) | 10:10 (wind: -1.1 m/s) | Maricel Cruz (PUR) | 10:37 (wind: -3.8 m/s) | Nahomy Rivera (PUR) | 10:43 (wind: -3.8 m/s) |
| 1000 metres | Deandra Knowles (BAH) | 3:21.96 | Bianca Dougan (IVB) | 3:22.89 | Marcela Díaz (MEX) | 3:24.14 |
| Long jump | Nahomy Rivera (PUR) | 5.04m | Deandra Knowles (BAH) | 4:93m | Makeba Alcide (LCA) | 4.89m |
| High jump | Brittany Munnings (BAH) | 1.55m | Nahomy Rivera (PUR) | 1.50m | Deandra Knowles (BAH); Yahaira Cano (MEX); Mihalia Maria (AHO); Davia James (LCA) | 1.40m |
| Shot put | Makeba Alcide (LCA) | 9.15m | Nahomy Rivera (PUR) | 9.03m | Marcela Díaz (MEX) | 8.91m |
| Hexathlon | Brittany Munnings (BAH) | 3307 | Makeba Alcide (LCA) | 3240 | Deandra Knowles (BAH) | 3236 |

| Event | Gold | | Silver | | Bronze | |
Boys 11–12
| 60 metres | Jonathan Santiago (PUR) | 8:30 (wind: -2.2 m/s) | Rashad Rankin (CAY) | 8:34 (wind: -2.2 m/s) | Diego Betancourt (MEX) | 8:45 (wind: -3.5 m/s) |
| 1000 metres | Bladimil Santana (DOM) | 3:15.79 | Dione Blyden (IVB) | 3:16.02 | Joel Fernández (DOM) | 3:18.86 |
| Long jump | Jonathan Santiago (PUR) | 4.64m | Jevonte Croal (IVB) | 4.57m | Dione Blyden (IVB) | 4.46m |
| High jump | Dione Blyden (IVB) | 1.40m | Quentin Siberie (AHO); Jonathan Santiago (PUR) | 1.35m | | |
| Baseball Throw | Diego Betancourt (MEX) | 64.87m | Jonathan Santiago (PUR) | 62.95m | Bladimil Santana (DOM) | 59.59m |
| Pentathlon | Dione Blyden (IVB) | 2550 | Diego Betancourt (MEX) | 2530 | Bladimil Santana (DOM) | 2504 |
Girls 11–12
| 60 metres | Henrietta Carey (BAH) | 8:00 (wind: -2.4 m/s) | Fanis Santos (DOM) | 8:20 (wind: +0.7 m/s) | Shamila Daal (AHO) | 8:21 (wind: +0.7 m/s) |
| 800 metres | Tyianiah Cash (BAH) | 2:38.06 | Carla Resendiz (MEX) | 2:39.35 | Fanis Santos (DOM) | 2:40.83 |
| Long jump | Henrietta Carey (BAH) | 4.33m | Yelinette Cintrón (PUR) | 4.29m | Kanishque Todman (IVB) | 4.20m |
| High jump | Fanis Santos (DOM) | 1.33m | Charlene Leslie (ARU); Henrietta Carey (BAH); Yelinette Cintrón (PUR); Naomi Santos (PUR) | 1.20m | | |
| Baseball Throw | Fanis Santos (DOM) | 45.35m | Zelone Laurence (LCA) | 43.00m | Monifa Jansen (AHO) | 41.83m |
| Pentathlon | Fanis Santos (DOM) | 2482 | Tyianiah Cash (BAH) | 2258 | Henrietta Carey (BAH) | 2246 |

== Team trophies ==
| Event | Gold | | Silver | | Bronze | |
|---|---|---|---|---|---|---|
| Boys and Girls Overall | Bahamas; Roland Pinder; Darion Duncombe; Brittany Munnings; Deandra Knowles; Geno Jones; Chavano Hield; Tyianiah Cash; Henrietta Carey | 22,671 | Dominican Republic; Tayron Reyes; Luis Romero; Paola Méndez; Yuliza Moquet; Bladimil Santana; Joel Fernández; Fanis Santos; Mariana Bazil | 22,035 | Netherlands Antilles; Rigmar Adamus; Terrence Agard; Mihalia Maria; Diona Marten; Quentin Siberie; Quillan Da Costa; Monifa Jansen; Shamila Daal | 21,772 |
| Boys Team | Dominican Republic; Tayron Reyes; Luis Romero; Bladimil Santana; Joel Fernández | 11,880 | Netherlands Antilles; Rigmar Adamus; Terrence Agard; Quentin Siberie; Quillan Da Costa | 11,780 | Bahamas; Roland Pinder; Darion Duncombe; Geno Jones; Chavano Hield | 11,624 |
| Boys 13–14 | Netherlands Antilles; Rigmar Adamus; Terrence Agard | 7,263 | Puerto Rico; Edwin Vargas; Alfredo Ortiz | 7,050 | Dominican Republic; Tayron Reyes; Luis Romero | 6,958 |
| Boys 11–12 | Dominican Republic; Bladimil Santana; Joel Fernández | 4,922 | British Virgin Islands; Dione Blyden; Jevonte Croal | 4,761 | Bahamas; Geno Jones; Chavano Hield | 4,702 |
| Girls Team | Bahamas; Brittany Munnings; Deandra Knowles; Tyianiah Cash; Henrietta Carey | 11,047 | Puerto Rico; Maricel Cruz; Nahomy Rivera; Yelinette Cintrón; Naomi Santos | 10,159 | Dominican Republic; Paola Méndez; Yuliza Moquet; Fanis Santos; Mariana Bazil | 10,155 |
| Girls 13–14 | Bahamas; Brittany Munnings; Deandra Knowles | 6,532 | Puerto Rico; Maricel Cruz; Nahomy Rivera | 6,179 | Saint Lucia; Makeba Alcide; Davia James | 6,056 |
| Girls 11–12 | Dominican Republic; Fanis Santos; Mariana Bazil | 4,564 | Bahamas; Tyianiah Cash; Henrietta Carey | 4,504 | British Virgin Islands; Kanishque Todman; Britney Wattley | 4,290 |
