= 2007 Central American and Caribbean Age Group Championships in Athletics =

XII Central American and Caribbean Age Group Championships
- Dates: 7–8 July
- Host city: San Salvador, El Salvador
- Venue: Estadio Jorge "Mágico" González
- Level: Age Group 10–13 years
- Participation: 104 athletes from 15 nations

The 12th Central American and Caribbean Age Group Championships in Athletics were hosted in San Salvador, El Salvador, on July 7–8, 2007, one week before the inaugural North American, Central American and Caribbean (NACAC) Senior Championships took place at the same site.

== Participation ==
The competition results are published.

In total there were 104 athletes from 15 federations. Athletes from Anguilla, Aruba, British Virgin Islands, Honduras, and U.S. Virgin Islands did not earn a medal.

== Medal summary ==
Event	Gold		Silver		Bronze	
Boys 12–13
80 metres	Darvin Sandy (TRI)	9.15	Raziel Ocampo (MEX)	9.26	Shakir Sandiford (BAR)	9.45
80 metres hurdles	Shakir Sandiford (BAR)	11.88	Darvin Sandy (TRI)	12.13	Jose A. Gonzalez (MEX)	12.18
1200 metres	Marvin J. Perez (ESA)	3:38.25	Raziel Ocampo (MEX)	3:59.91	Jose A. Gonzalez (MEX)	4:00.10
Long Jump	Raziel Ocampo (MEX)	5.61m	Ronald A. Alvarenga (ESA)	5.45m	Clive Pullen (JAM)	5.31m
High Jump	Jose A. Gonzalez (MEX)	1.87m	Raziel Ocampo (MEX)	1.68m	Clive Pullen (JAM)	1.65m
Shot Put	Jose A. Gonzalez (MEX)	13.89m	Ronald A. Alvarenga (ESA)	13.65m	Raziel Ocampo (MEX)	12.47m
Hexathlon	Jose A. Gonzalez (MEX)	4237	Raziel Ocampo (MEX)	4044	Darvin Sandy (TRI)	3888
Girls 12–13
80 metres	Shanice McPherson (JAM)	10.08	Akela Jones (BAR)	10.11	Shaunae Miller (BAH)	10.30
60 metres hurdles	Patricia Mendoza (MEX)	9.20	Akela Jones (BAR)	9.72	Shaunae Miller (BAH); Maria Renee Gomez (ESA)	9.82; 9.82
1000 metres	Chrisan Gordon (JAM)	3:23.08	Taniece Watson (BAR)	3:24.23	Stephany L. Melgar (GUA)	3:25.55
Long Jump	Patricia Mendoza (MEX)	5.25m	Shanice McPherson (JAM)	5.06m	Shaunae Miller (BAH)	4.84m
High Jump	Akela Jones (BAR)	1.57m	Ashleigh Nalty (CAY)	1.55m	Patricia Mendoza (MEX)	1.54m
Shot Put	Patricia Mendoza (MEX)	10.35m	Shaunae Miller (BAH)	8.44m	Akela Jones (BAR)	8.22m
Hexathlon	Patricia Mendoza (MEX)	3521	Shaunae Miller (BAH)	3324	Akela Jones (BAR)	3232
Mixed 12–13
4x100 metres relay						

Event	Gold		Silver		Bronze	
Boys 10–11
60 metres	Tristan Alleyne (BAR)	7.64	Enmanuel Baldera (DOM)	7.72	Kevin Zelaya (ESA)	7.97
1000 metres	Jesus Fierro (MEX)	3:10,90	Jamarley Toney (BAR)	3:16.59	Kevin Zelaya (ESA)	3:18,47
Long Jump	Nicholon Caesar (TRI)	4.44m	Kevin Zelaya (ESA); Mark Ducombe (BAH)	4.30m 4.30m		
High Jump	Justin Nalty (CAY); Jesus Fierro (MEX); Edson Moses (TRI)	1.45m 1.45m 1.45m				
Baseball Throw	Jesus Fierro (MEX)	58.28m	Tristan Alleyne (BAR)	54.61m	Jesus Vasquez (MEX)	51.60m
Pentathlon	Jesus Fierro (MEX)	2881	Kevin Zelaya (ESA)	2774	Tristan Alleyne (BAR)	2642
Girls 10–11
60 metres	Andrea C. Vargas (CRC)	7.90	Tania Nuñez (MEX)	8.09	Shemaiah Clarke (TRI)	8.20
800 metres	Andrea C. Vargas (CRC)	2:29.85	Zalicia Knight (BAR)	2:37,37	Yeini Jimenez (DOM)	2:46,30
Long Jump	Talasia Balgobin (BAR)	4.60m	Tania Nuñez (MEX)	4.59m	Andrea C. Vargas (CRC)	4.57m
High Jump	Andrea C. Vargas (CRC)	1.39m	Edith de Santiago (MEX)	1.37m	Shemaiah Clarke (TRI)	1.35m
Baseball Throw	Ayana Glasgow (TRI)	41.02m	Edith de Santiago (MEX)	38.90m	Yeini Jimenez (DOM)	38.41m
Pentathlon	Andrea C. Vargas (CRC)	2738	Tania Nuñez (MEX)	2348	Talasia Balgobin (BAR)	2343
Mixed 10–11
4x100 metres relay	Mexico; Edith de Santiago; Tania Nuñez; Jesus Vasquez; Jesus Fierro	53.46	Trinidad and Tobago; Ayana Glasgow; Shemaiah Clarke; Nicholon Caesar; Edson Moses	54.32	Bahamas; Danielle Gibson; Miguel Roach; Calvin Anderson; Mark Ducombe	54.59

== Medal table (unofficial) ==
Results for the mixed 4 × 100 m relay for the age group 12–13 years are not available.

* Host nation (El Salvador)

Rank	Nation	Gold	Silver	Bronze	Total
1	Mexico	13	9	5	27
2	Barbados	4	6	5	15
3	Trinidad and Tobago	4	2	3	9
4	Costa Rica	4	0	1	5
5	Jamaica	2	1	2	5
6	El Salvador*	1	4	3	8
7	Cayman Islands	1	1	0	2
8	Bahamas	0	3	4	7
9	Dominican Republic	0	1	2	3
10	Guatemala	0	0	1	1
Totals (10 entries)		29	27	26	82

== Team trophies ==
Event	Gold		Silver		Bronze	
Boys and Girls Overall	Barbados; Shakir Sandiford; Tremaine Maloney; Tristan Alleyne; Jamarley Toney; Akela Jones; Taniece Watson; Talasia Balgobin; Zalicia Knight	23,143	Mexico; Jose A. Gonzalez; Raziel Ocampo; Jesus Fierro; Jesus Vasquez; Patricia Mendoza; Tania Nuñez; Edith de Santiago	21,928	Trinidad and Tobago; Darvin Sandy; Wayne Bonaparte; Edson Moses; Nicholon Caesar; Chelsea Aberdeen; Kelly Adams; Shemaiah Clarke; Ayana Glasgow	21,811
Boys Overall	Mexico; Jose A. Gonzalez; Raziel Ocampo; Jesus Fierro; Jesus Vasquez	13,783	Barbados; Shakir Sandiford; Tremaine Maloney; Tristan Alleyne; Jamarley Toney	12,510	Trinidad and Tobago; Darvin Sandy; Wayne Bonaparte; Edson Moses; Nicholon Caesar	11,987
Boys 12-13	Mexico; Jose A. Gonzalez; Raziel Ocampo	8,281	Trinidad and Tobago; Darvin Sandy; Wayne Bonaparte	7,317	Barbados; Shakir Sandiford; Tremaine Maloney	7,264
Boys 10-11	Mexico; Jesus Fierro; Jesus Vasquez	5,502	Barbados; Tristan Alleyne; Jamarley Toney	5,246	Trinidad and Tobago; Edson Moses; Nicholon Caesar	4,670
Girls Overall	Barbados; Akela Jones; Taniece Watson; Talasia Balgobin; Zalicia Knight	10,633	Bahamas; Shaunae Miller; Khadijah Curtis; Miguel Roach; Danielle Gibson	10,000	Trinidad and Tobago; Chelsea Aberdeen; Kelly Adams; Shemaiah Clarke; Ayana Glasgow	9,824
Girls 12-13	Barbados; Akela Jones; Taniece Watson	6,198	Jamaica; Shanice McPherson; Chrisan Gordon	5,911	Bahamas; Shaunae Miller; Khadijah Curtis	5,888
Girls 10-11	Mexico; Tania Nuñez; Edith de Santiago	4,624	Costa Rica; Andrea C. Vargas; Melissa Herrera	4,525	Barbados; Talasia Balgobin; Zalicia Knight	4,435
