= Shaunae Miller-Uibo =

Bahamian sprinter (born 1994)

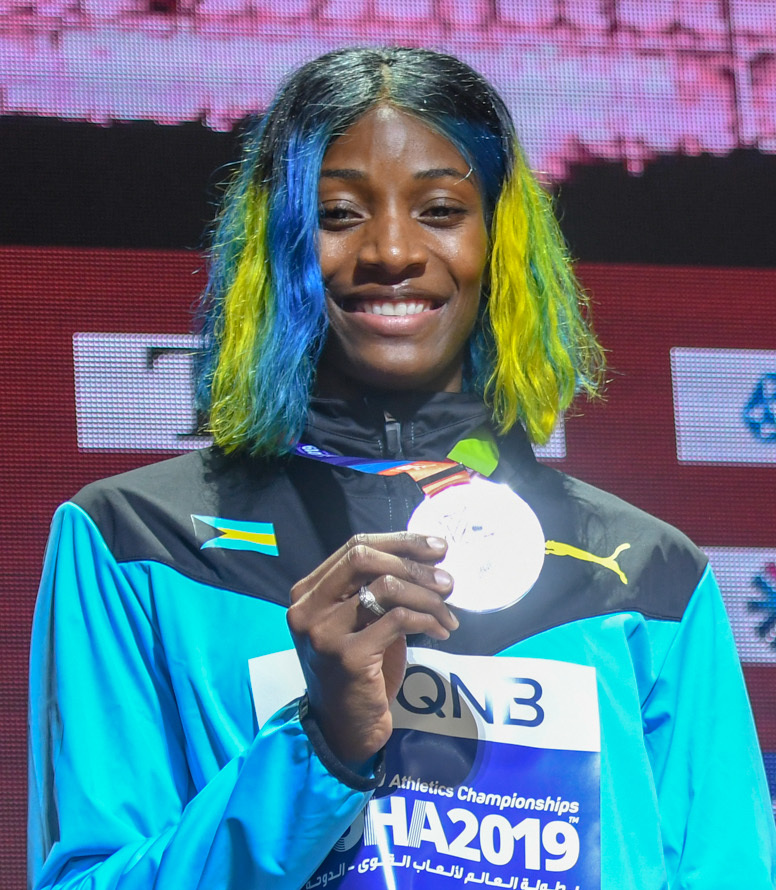
- Miller-Uibo at the 2019 World Athletics Championships in Doha

Personal information
- Born: Shaunae Miller; 15 April 1994 (age 32) Nassau, Bahamas
- Height: 1.85 m (6 ft 1 in)
- Weight: 69 kg (152 lb)
- Spouse: Maicel Uibo (married 2017)

Sport
- Country: The Bahamas
- Sport: Athletics
- Event: Sprint
- College team: Georgia Bulldogs
- Club: Pure Athletics Club
- Coached by: Lance Brauman

Achievements and titles
- Olympic finals: 2016 Rio; 400 m, Gold; 2020 Tokyo; 200 m, 8th; 400 m, Gold
- World finals: 2013 Moscow; 200 m, 4th; 2015 Beijing; 400 m, Silver; 2017 London; 200 m, Bronze; 400 m, 4th; 2019 Doha; 400 m, Silver; 2022 Eugene; 400 m, Gold
- Highest world ranking: 1 (weeks 42)
- Personal bests: 100 m: 10.98 (Clermont 2020); 200 m: 21.74 NR (Zürich 2019); 300 m: 34.41 WB (Ostrava, 2019); 400 m: 48.36 NR (Tokyo 2021); Indoors; 200 m: 22.40i NR (Fayetteville 2021); 300 m: 35.45i WB (New York 2018); 400 m: 50.21i NR (New York 2021)
Medal record
Women's athletics
Representing the Bahamas
Olympic Games
Gold medal – first place	2016 Rio de Janeiro	400 m
Gold medal – first place	2020 Tokyo	400 m
World Championships
Gold medal – first place	2022 Eugene	400 m
Silver medal – second place	2015 Beijing	400 m
Silver medal – second place	2019 Doha	400 m
Bronze medal – third place	2017 London	200 m
World Indoor Championships
Gold medal – first place	2022 Belgrade	400 m
Bronze medal – third place	2014 Sopot	400 m
World Athletics Relays
Gold medal – first place	2017 Nassau	4 × 400 m mixed
Diamond League
First place	2017	200 m
First place	2017	400 m
First place	2018	200 m
First place	2019	200 m
Commonwealth Games
Gold medal – first place	2018 Gold Coast	200 m
NACAC Championships
Gold medal – first place	2022 Freeport	400 m
Continental Cup
Representing the Americas
Gold medal – first place	2018 Ostrava	200 m
Gold medal – first place	2018 Ostrava	4 × 100 m relay
Gold medal – first place	2018 Ostrava	4 × 400 m mixed
World Junior Championships
Gold medal – first place	2010 Moncton	400 m
Pan American Junior Championships
Bronze medal – third place	2009 Port of Spain	4 × 400 m relay
World Youth Championships
Gold medal – first place	2011 Lille	400 m

Shaunae Miller-Uibo, née Shaunae Miller, (15 April 1994) is a Bahamian track and field sprinter who competes in the 200 and 400 metres. She is a two-time Olympic champion after winning the women's 400 metres at the 2016 Rio Olympics and again at the 2020 Tokyo Olympics.

At the World Athletics Championships, Miller-Uibo won silver medals in the 400 m in 2015 and 2019, and a bronze at the 200 m in 2017 when she also placed fourth at her longer distance. In 2022, she won her first world outdoor and indoor 400 m titles. She held North American records in the 400 m both outdoors and indoors until broken in 2024 and 2023 respectively. Her marks of 48.36 (improved at the Tokyo Games) and 50.21 seconds place her respectively eighth and joint 14th on the world all-time list. She holds world bests over the 300 metres outdoors and indoors.

At 16 years old, she was the 400 m 2010 World junior champion and took the World youth title a year later. At 19, Miller-Uibo placed fourth in the 200 m at the 2013 World Championships, and then took her first senior medal (a bronze) at the 2014 World Indoor Championships competing at 400 m. She was the 2018 Commonwealth Games 200 m champion and won four Diamond League titles, having secured the 200 m/400 m double in 2017; she owns circuit records in both disciplines.

Miller-Uibo holds the world's fastest women's marks in straight races of 150 m and 200 m. Her personal best of 21.74 s for the 200 m is a Bahamian national record. She won several national titles in both her disciplines and the NCAA Division I indoor title for the Georgia Bulldogs and Lady Bulldogs.

== Early life ==
Of Afro-Bahamian heritage, Miller-Uibo was born in a Christian home to Mabelene and Shaun Miller in Nassau, Bahamas, the granddaughter and niece of pastors, on 15 April 1994. She has a personal faith and trust in God. Her sister is Shauntae-Ashleigh Miller, Miss Universe Bahamas 2020.

She completed her high school education at St. Augustine's College in Nassau and later attended the University of Georgia.

== Youth and junior career ==
Miller-Uibo competed in athletics from a very young age and won five medals at the 2007 Central American and Caribbean Age Group Championships in Athletics in the under-14 category. Bronze medals in relay races followed at the 2009 CARIFTA Games and the 2009 Pan American Junior Athletics Championships.

She claimed the 400 m titles at the 2010 Central American and Caribbean Junior Championships and 2010 CARIFTA Games, as well as four medals with the Bahamas in the 4 × 100 metres relay and 4 × 400 metres relay. Sixteen-year-old Miller-Uibo became the first Bahamian to be 400 m champion at the 2010 World Junior Championships in Athletics and the youngest woman to ever win the event. She won the gold medal in a time of 52.52, denying Margaret Etim, who finished second in 53.05 (this was the slowest winning time in the history of the event).

In the following year, Miller-Uibo won the 2011 World Youth Championships in Athletics with a time of 51.84, becoming the first athlete ever to hold both the U20 and U18 championship 400 m titles concurrently. She returned to defend her 400 m title at the 2011 CARIFTA Games, but was disqualified in the final. She also failed in her defence at the 2012 World Junior Championships in Athletics, trailing in fourth. However, she won 200 m and 4 × 400 metres relay silver medals at the 2012 CARIFTA Games. In her last age category competition, she won three gold medals (200 m, 400 m, 4 × 100 metres relay) at the 2013 CARIFTA Games and was given the Austin Sealy Award as the best athlete of the tournament.

== Senior career ==
At the 2012 London Olympics, Miller-Uibo did not finish her 400 m heat. She turned professional in 2013, signing a sponsorship deal with Adidas. She made her first global final that same year, taking fourth in the 200 m at the 2013 World Championships in Athletics. The year after, Miller-Uibo won her first senior medal, finishing behind Francena McCorory and Kaliese Spencer in the 400 m at the 2014 IAAF World Indoor Championships. She made the 200 m final at the 2014 Commonwealth Games but ended the race in sixth.

The 2015 season marked her first impact at the Diamond League, as she won the 400 m at the top level Athletissima and Memorial Van Damme meets. Miller-Uibo won the silver medal in the 400 m at the 2015 World Championships that year. She also ran with the Bahamian women's 4 × 400 m relay team in the heats at that competition and set a Bahamian national record of 3:28.46 minutes.

In 2016, Miller-Uibo won the Prefontaine Classic 400 m race.

2016 Rio Olympic champion

At the 2016 Rio Olympics, she won the gold medal in the 400 m, to beat Allyson Felix by 0.07 seconds and record a personal best time of 49.44 seconds. She was the flag-bearer for the Bahamas at the 2016 Summer Olympics. Miller-Uibo went on to win the gold medal again in the 400 m at the 2020 Olympics, held in Tokyo in 2021.

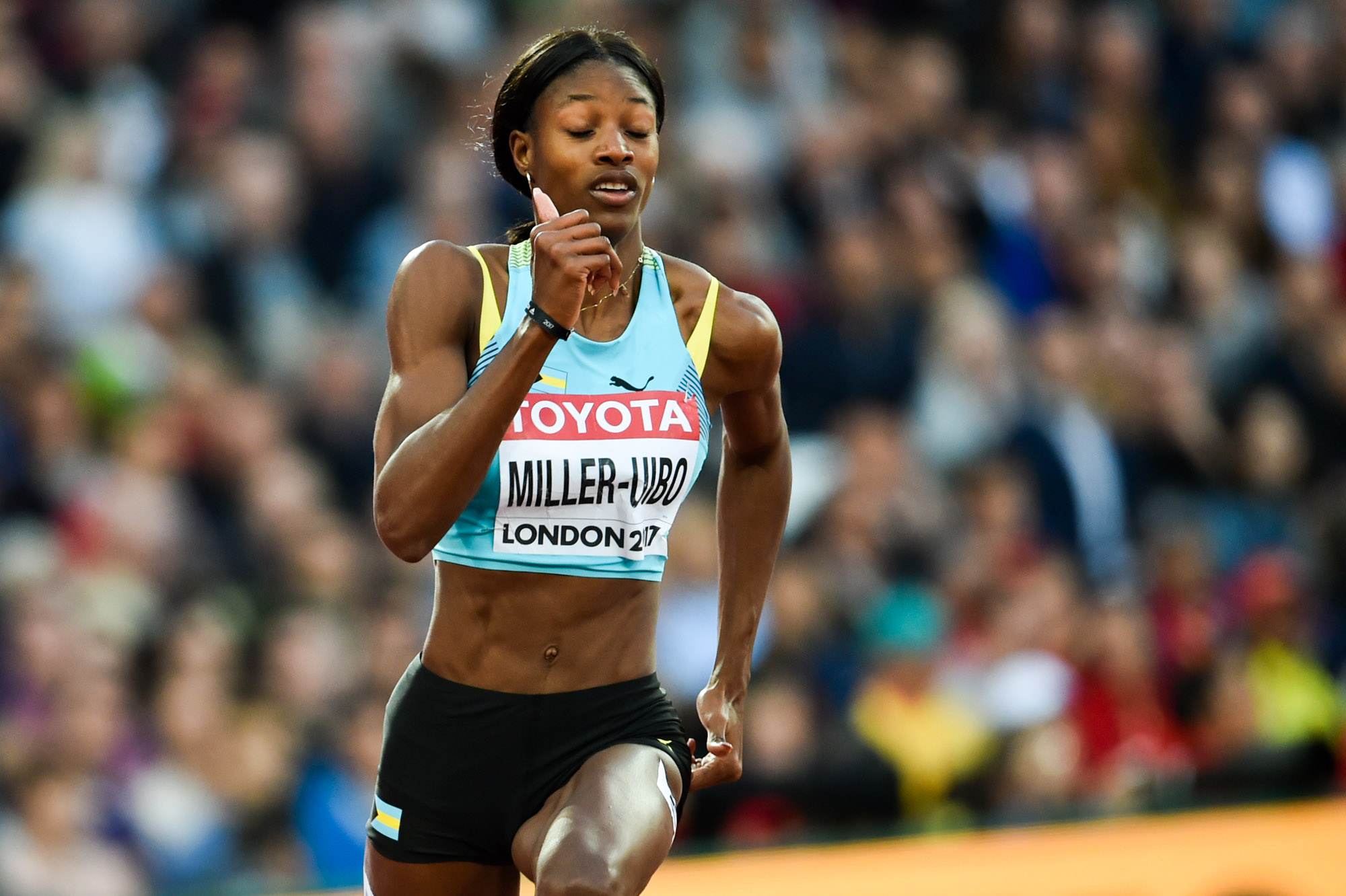
Miller-Uibo races the 200 m at the 2017 World Championships in Athletics in London.

At the 2017 Prefontaine Classic, Miller-Uibo became the first Bahamian woman to run under 22 seconds in the 200 m, improving her own national record to 21.91 seconds. On 4 June 2017, she set the 200 metres straight world record of 21.76 s, greatly improving the previous record of 22.55 s set by Allyson Felix. At the 2017 World Championships in London, she won the bronze medal in the 200 m event and finished fourth in the 400 m final. That same year, Miller-Uibo became the first Bahamian ever to win a Diamond League title as she claimed both the 200 m and 400 m titles.

Having dominated the 200 m during 2018 and 2019 and clocking a world-leading time in the 400 m in 2018, Miller-Uibo won the 400 m silver medal at the 2019 World Championships in Athletics in Qatar, running the tenth fastest time in history, a national record of 48.37 seconds. The winner of the event, Salwa Eid Naser, was provisionally suspended by the Athletics Integrity Unit in June 2020 for missing four anti-doping tests in 12 months, the last of which was in January 2020.

On 13 February 2021, Miller-Uibo broke the NACAC indoor 400 m record with a time of 50.21 seconds, set at the New Balance Indoor Grand Prix in New York. On 4 April, she opened her outdoor season with a world-leading time of 22.03 s, her fastest ever 200 m opener, set at the Pure Athletics Spring Invitational in Clermont, Florida.

In March 2022, she claimed her first world title as a senior, winning the women's 400 m event at the World Indoor Championships in Belgrade with a time of 50.31 s, after her bronze indoor debut in 2014. Later that year in July, Miller-Uibo went on to secure her first senior world outdoor title at the World Championships Eugene 2022 in a time of 49.11 s, winning by nearly half a second in leading a Caribbean sweep. Afterwards, she revealed that she is looking forward to changing her main discipline to the 200 metres and possibly heptathlon. In 2026, she returned to the circuit, competing in the 200 metres as her main discipline.

== Personal life ==
Miller met Maicel Uibo, an Estonian decathlete who won silver at the 2019 World Championships in Georgia, and the pair married in 2017. On 4 February 2023, she announced her first pregnancy via Instagram. The baby, a son named Maicel Uibo Jr, was born on 20 April 2023.

== Achievements ==
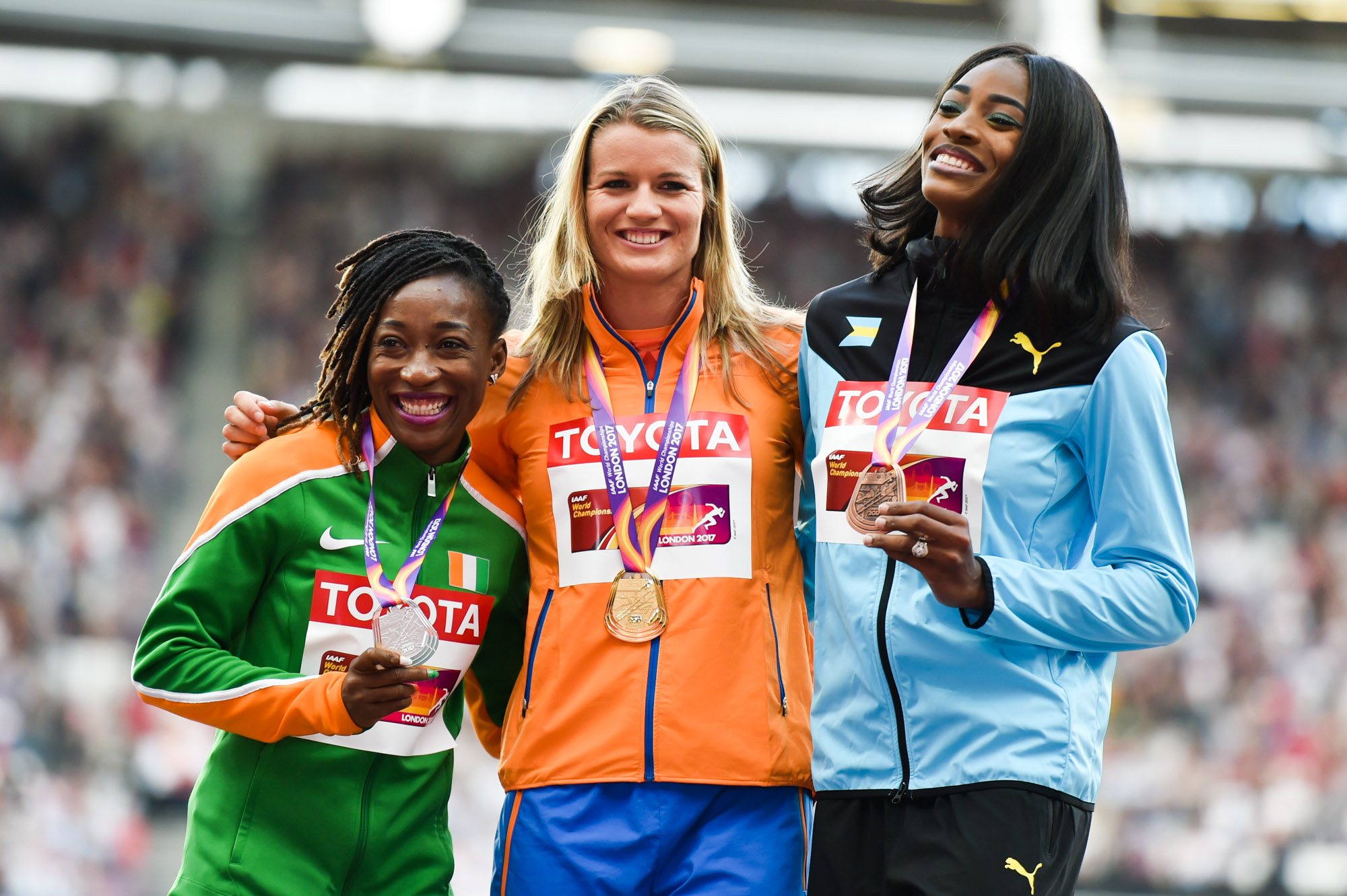
Women's 200 m podium at the 2017 World Championships in London (L–R): Marie-Josée Ta Lou, Dafne Schippers and Shaunae Miller-Uibo.

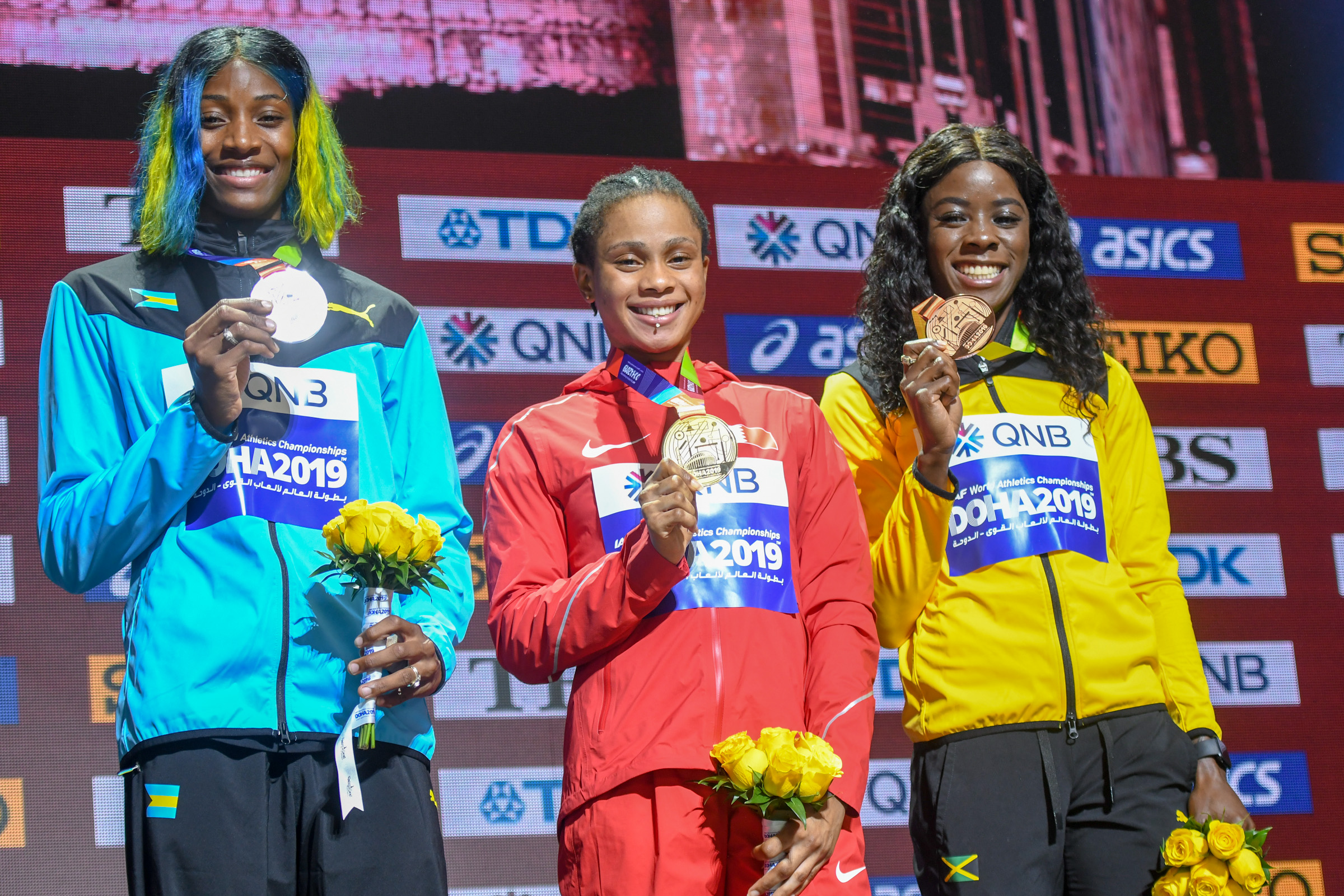
Women's 400 m podium at the 2019 World Championships in Doha (L–R): Shaunae Miller-Uibo, Salwa Eid Naser and Shericka Jackson.

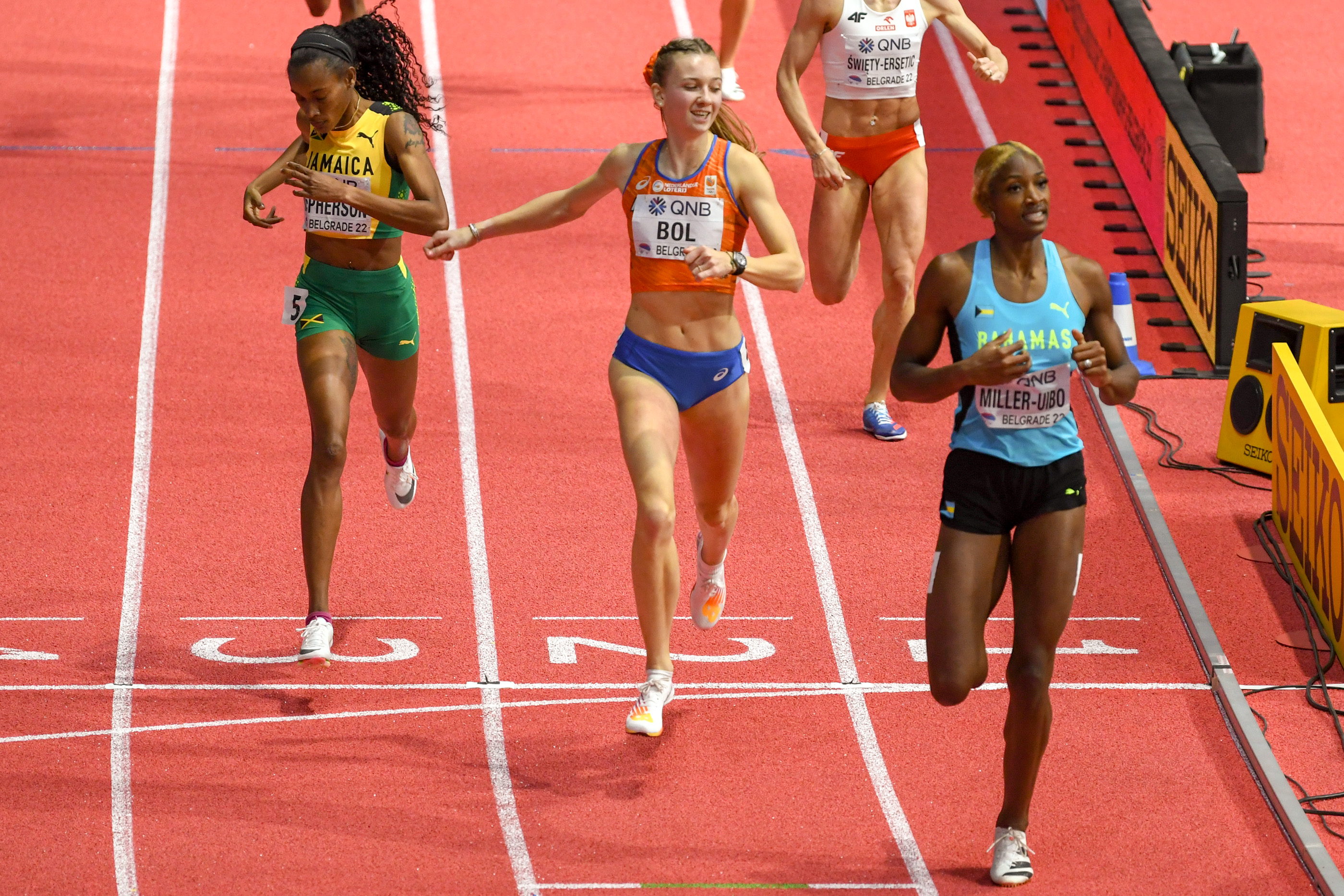
Miller-Uibo (R) claimed her first senior world title with a 400 m victory at the 2022 World Indoor Championships held in Belgrade.

=== Personal bests ===
Type	Distance	Time (s)	Wind (m/s)	Venue	Date	Notes
Outdoor	100 metres	10.98	+1.4	Clermont, FL, United States	24 July 2020	
Outdoor	150 metres	17.15	-2.5	Bradenton, FL, United States	9 July 2020	
Outdoor	200 metres	21.74	-0.4	Zürich, Switzerland	29 August 2019	NR
Outdoor	300 metres	34.41	—N/a	Ostrava, Czech Republic	20 June 2019	World best
Outdoor	400 metres	48.36	—N/a	Tokyo, Japan	6 August 2021	North American record, 6th all time
Indoor	200 metres	22.40	—N/a	Fayetteville, AR, United States	31 January 2021	NR
Indoor	300 metres	35.45	—N/a	New York, NY United States	3 February 2018	AB =World best
Indoor	400 metres	50.21	—N/a	New York, NY United States	13 February 2021	=10th all time
Other events
Outdoor	150 m straight	16.23	-0.7	Boston, MA, United States	20 May 2018	1st all time
Outdoor	200 m straight	21.76	+0.5	Boston, MA, United States	4 June 2017	1st all time

=== International competitions ===
Representing the Bahamas
Year	Competition	Venue	Position	Event	Result
2007	CAC Age Group Championships (U14)	San Salvador, El Salvador	3rd	80 m	10.30
2007	CAC Age Group Championships (U14)	San Salvador, El Salvador	3rd	60 m hurdles	9.82
2007	CAC Age Group Championships (U14)	San Salvador, El Salvador	3rd	Long jump	4.84 m
2007	CAC Age Group Championships (U14)	San Salvador, El Salvador	2nd	Shot put	8.44 m
2007	CAC Age Group Championships (U14)	San Salvador, El Salvador	2nd	Hexathlon	3324 pts
2009	CARIFTA Games (U17) (Note: Miller competed in the under-20 (U20) category for the 4 × 400 m relay.)	Vieux Fort, Saint Lucia	5th	100 m	11.94 w
2009	CARIFTA Games (U17)	Vieux Fort, Saint Lucia	6th	300 m hurdles	44.55
2009	CARIFTA Games (U17)	Vieux Fort, Saint Lucia	3rd	4 × 100 m relay	47.04
2009	CARIFTA Games (U17)	Vieux Fort, Saint Lucia	3rd	4 × 400 m relay	3:45.99
2009	Pan American Junior Championships	Port of Spain, Trinidad and Tobago	5th	4 × 100 m relay	45.85
2009	Pan American Junior Championships	Port of Spain, Trinidad and Tobago	3rd	4 × 400 m relay	3:42.17
2010	CAC Junior Championships (U17)	Santo Domingo, Dominican Republic	3rd	200 m	24.51
2010	CAC Junior Championships (U17)	Santo Domingo, Dominican Republic	1st	400 m	53.39
2010	CAC Junior Championships (U17)	Santo Domingo, Dominican Republic	2nd	4 × 100 m relay	46.64
2010	CAC Junior Championships (U17)	Santo Domingo, Dominican Republic	2nd	4 × 400 m relay	3:51.27
2010	CARIFTA Games (U17)	George Town, Cayman Islands	1st	400 m	53.36
2010	CARIFTA Games (U17)	George Town, Cayman Islands	4th	300 m hurdles	43.35
2010	CARIFTA Games (U17)	George Town, Cayman Islands	3rd	4 × 100 m relay	46.85
2010	CARIFTA Games (U17)	George Town, Cayman Islands	3rd	4 × 400 m relay	3:48.86
2010	World Junior Championships	Moncton, Canada	1st	400 m	52.52
2010	World Junior Championships	Moncton, Canada	4th	4 × 400 m relay	3:33.43
2011	CARIFTA Games	Montego Bay, Jamaica	DQ	400 m	False start
2011	CARIFTA Games	Montego Bay, Jamaica	3rd	4 × 400 m relay	3:41.05
2011	World Youth Championships	Lille, France	1st	400 m	51.84
2012	CARIFTA Games (U20)	Hamilton, Bermuda	2nd	200 m	23.18
2012	CARIFTA Games (U20)	Hamilton, Bermuda	2nd	4 × 400 m relay	3:40.44
2012	World Junior Championships	Barcelona, Spain	4th	400 m	51.78
2012	Olympic Games	London, United Kingdom	DNF (heats)	400 m	Did not finish
2013	CARIFTA Games (U20)	Nassau, Bahamas	1st	200 m	22.77 CR
2013	CARIFTA Games (U20)	Nassau, Bahamas	1st	400 m	51.63
2013	CARIFTA Games (U20)	Nassau, Bahamas	1st	4 × 100 m relay	44.77
2013	World Championships	Moscow, Russia	4th	200 m	22.74
2013	World Championships	Moscow, Russia	DQ (semis)	4 × 100 m relay	Lane infringement
2014	World Indoor Championships	Sopot, Poland	3rd	400 m	52.06
2014	Commonwealth Games	Glasgow, United Kingdom	6th	400 m	53.08
2014	Commonwealth Games	Glasgow, United Kingdom	7th (semis)	4 × 100 m relay	44.50 Q (Note: Miller ran for the Bahamian team in the semis and helped them qualify for the final, but she was replaced with another runner in the final; The squad that ran in the final finished 6th.)
2014	Commonwealth Games	Glasgow, United Kingdom	7th	4 × 400 m relay	3:34.86
2015	World Relays	Nassau, Bahamas	DQ	4 × 200 m relay	Illegal pass
2015	World Championships	Beijing, China	2nd	400 m	49.67
2015	World Championships	Beijing, China	10th (semis)	4 × 400 m relay	3:28.46 NR
2016	Olympic Games	Rio de Janeiro, Brazil	1st	400 m	49.44
2017	World Relays	Nassau, Bahamas	10th (semis)	4 × 400 m relay	3:34.40
2017	World Relays	Nassau, Bahamas	1st	4 × 400 m mixed	3:14.42
2017	World Championships	London, United Kingdom	3rd	200 m	22.15
2017	World Championships	London, United Kingdom	4th	400 m	50.49
2018	Commonwealth Games	Gold Coast, Australia	1st	200 m	22.09 GR
2018	Continental Cup	Ostrava, Czech Republic	1st	200 m	22.16
2018	Continental Cup	Ostrava, Czech Republic	1st	4 × 100 m relay	42.11
2018	Continental Cup	Ostrava, Czech Republic	1st	4 × 400 m mixed	3:13.01
2019	World Championships	Doha, Qatar	2nd	400 m	48.37 AR
2021	Olympic Games	Tokyo, Japan	8th	200 m	24.00
2021	Olympic Games	Tokyo, Japan	1st	400 m	48.36 AR
2022	World Indoor Championships	Belgrade, Serbia	1st	400 m	50.31 SB
2022	World Championships	Eugene, OR, United States	1st	400 m	49.11 WL
2022	NACAC Championships	Freeport, Bahamas	1st	400 m	49.40
2023	World Championships	Budapest, Hungary	37th (h)	400 m	52.65
2024	Olympic Games	Paris, France	26th (rep)	400 m	53.50
2025	NACAC Championships	Freeport, Bahamas	5th (h)	400 m	51.44 (Note: Did not start in the final)
2026	World Ultimate Championship	Budapest, Hungary	6th (h)	200 m	22.39 (Note: Did not start in the final)

=== Circuit wins and titles ===
- Diamond League champion: 2017 (200 m & 400 m), 2018 (200 m), 2019 (200 m)

400 metres wins, other events specified in parentheses

- 2015 (2): Lausanne, Brussels
- 2016 (3): Shanghai, Eugene, London (WL)
- 2017 (4): Shanghai (WL), Rabat (MR), Zürich (200 m, NR), Brussels (WL SB)
- 2018 (6): Shanghai (200 m, MR SB), Eugene, Rabat (200 m, MR), Monaco (WL DLR NR}, Birmingham (200 m, MR), Brussels (200 m)
- 2019 (3): Monaco (200 m, SB), Birmingham (200 m), Zürich (200 m, WL DLR NR)
- 2021 (1): Monaco (200 m)
- 2022 (2): Paris, Monaco

=== National titles ===
- Bahamian National Championships
  - 200 m: 2017,2021
  - 400 m: 2010, 2014, 2015, 2016, 2019, 2021
  - High jump: 2018

== See also ==
- List of 2016 Summer Olympics medal winners
- List of Olympic medalists in athletics (women)
- List of World Championships in Athletics medalists (women)
- List of professional sports families
- List of Bahamians
- 200 metres at the World Championships in Athletics
- 400 metres at the Olympics
- Bahamas at the Olympics

Records
Preceded by (United States) Sanya Richards-Ross	Women's 400 m North and Central American record holder 3 October 2019 – 9 August 2024	Succeeded by (Dominican Republic) Marileidy Paulino

Olympic Games
Preceded by Chris Brown	Flagbearer for Bahamas; Rio de Janeiro 2016	Succeeded by Joanna Evans; Donald Thomas
