= 2011 Central American and Caribbean Age Group Championships in Athletics =

XIV Central American and Caribbean Age Group Championships
- Dates: 1 – 2 July
- Host city: Tortola, British Virgin Islands
- Venue: A.O. Shirley Recreation Ground
- Level: Age Group 11-14 years
- Participation: 139 athletes from 20 nations

The Central American and Caribbean Age Group Championships in Athletics was hosted for the first time in Tortola, British Virgin Islands, on July 1–2, 2011. The BVI Athletics Association is organizing the event which is part of its 40th anniversary activities. It is the smallest CACAC family member to host a CACAC Championships event, which is held for the first time in the Leeward Islands.

15 new championships records were established, and the athletes from Barbados collected the most points to win the overall trophy in the CAC age group championships for the third time in the role.

== Participation ==
A total of 139 athletes from 20 CACAC member federations participated in the event. The competition results are published. Each participating federation earned at least one medal.

== Medal summary ==
Event	Gold		Silver		Bronze	
Boys 13-14
80 metres	Mario Burke (BAR)	9.09 CR	Ramarco Thompson (BAR)	9.23	(Guadeloupe) /Guillaume Paquet (GLP)	9.67
80 metres hurdles	Ramarco Thompson (BAR)	11.44 CR	Mario Burke (BAR)	11.44 CR	Sean Wright (JAM)	11.74
1200 metres	Kinard Rolle (BAH)	3:33.54	Raymond Ocasio (PUR)	3:33.62	Juan Francisco Nunez (DOM)	3:36.72
Long Jump	Sean Wright (JAM)	6.13m	Andwuelle Wright (TRI)	6.04m	Kimone Paterson (GRN)	6.00m
High Jump	Ramarco Thompson (BAR)	1.88m CR	Kyron McMaster (IVB)	1.75m	Nitchev Casseus (BAH); Andwuelle Wright (TRI)	1.68m 1.68m
Baseball Throw	Anderson Peters (GRN)	86.36m CR	Juan Francisco Nunez (DOM)	85.67m	Gerardo Flores (MEX)	77.75m
Shot Put	(Guadeloupe) /Guillaume Paquet (GLP)	15.26m CR	Anderson Peters (GRN)	14.56m	Kimone Paterson (GRN)	13.22m
Heptathlon	Ramarco Thompson (BAR)	5264	Kimone Paterson (GRN)	4938	(Guadeloupe) /Guillaume Paquet (GLP)	4904
Girls 13-14
80 metres	(Guadeloupe) /Laure-Anne Jabin (GLP)	10.16 CR	Nargelis Statia (CUR)	10.46	Jody-Ann Petrie (JAM)	10.51
60 metres hurdles	(Guadeloupe) /Yanis David (GLP)	9.55 CR	(Guadeloupe) /Laure-Anne Jabin (GLP)	9.66	Danielle Scantlebury (BAR)	9.66
1000 metres	Keressa Eddy (SKN)	3:20.40	Jordan Bascome (BER)	3:22.60	Lina Terrero (DOM)	3:28.78
Long Jump	Jody-Ann Petrie (JAM)	5.34m	(Guadeloupe) /Laure-Anne Jabin (GLP)	5.18m	Rechelle Meade (AIA)	5.03m
High Jump	Ayana Glasgow (TRI)	1.61m CR	Nargelis Statia (CUR)	1.60m	Azaire Smith (BER)	1.55m
Baseball Throw	Shikkira Charles (GRN)	57.03m CR	Naeemah Isidora (CUR)	54.36m	Nuris Margarita Doroteo (DOM)	50.75m
Shot Put	Andira Ferguson (BAH)	9.87m	(Guadeloupe) /Yanis David (GLP)	9.85m	Kristal Liburd (SKN)	9.82m
Heptathlon	Danielle Scantlebury (BAR)	3894	(Guadeloupe) /Laure-Anne Jabin (GLP)	3884	Julianne Dorothal (ARU)	3866
Mixed 13-14
4×100 metres relay	Barbados; Jalisa Burrowes; Mario Burke; Danielle Scantlebury; Ramarco Thompson	47.65	Bahamas; Andira Ferguson; Nitchev Casseus; Kinard Rolle; Iasha Taylor	48.03	/Guadeloupe; Yanis David; Carmickael Dorville; Laure-Anne Jabin; Guillaume Paquet	48.67

Event	Gold		Silver		Bronze	
Boys 11-12
60 metres	Kwan Stewart (VIN)	8.04	Kedrick Matthew (IVB)	8.06	Christopher Taitt (BAR)	8.09
1000 metres	Rafi Ventura Tavarez (DOM)	3:07.04	Ruwensley Hansen (CUR)	3:14.45	Jomarie Lynch (VIN)	3:15.91
Long Jump	Jahi Hernandez (TRI)	4.94m	Ahmed Joseph (ISV)	4.87m	Christopher Taitt (BAR)	4.84m
High Jump	Ruwensley Hansen (CUR)	1.62m	Elisha Darrell (BER)	1.59m	Branson Rolle (BAH)	1.52m
Baseball Throw	Christopher Taitt (BAR)	61.34m	Xavier Vazquez (PUR)	60.60m	Ahmed Joseph (ISV)	59.56m
Pentathlon	Xavier Vazquez (PUR)	3109	Christopher Taitt (BAR)	3012	Ruwensley Hansen (CUR)	3004
Girls 11-12
60 metres	Blayre Catalyn (BAH)	8.23 CR	Shanice Elliot (SKN); Cristanna McConney (BAR)	8.24; 8.24		
800 metres	Jomarie Carmona Colon (PUR)	2:27.73 CR	Tiana Bowen (BAR)	2:28.01	Janique Fleming (AIA)	2:33.51
Long Jump	Jomarie Carmona Colon (PUR)	4.87m CR	Tarah Niles (AIA)	4.82m	Mariella Mena Saravia (ESA)	4.77m
High Jump	(Martinique) /Naomi Gestel (MTQ)	1.52m CR	Tiana Bowen (BAR)	1.49m	Zinedine Russell (JAM)	1.46m
Baseball Throw	Daneliz Thomas (CAY)	49.56m CR	Tarah Niles (AIA)	48.20m	Arianna Hayde (IVB)	48.16m
Pentathlon	Tiana Bowen (BAR)	2919	Jomarie Carmona Colon (PUR)	2833	Tarah Niles (AIA)	2710
Mixed 11-12
4×100 metres relay	Barbados; Ryan Vickers; Tiana Bowen; Christopher Taitt; Cristanna McConney	49.97	Saint Kitts and Nevis; Curvis Collins; Keon Buchanan; Namibia Clavier; Shanice Elliot	51.74	Trinidad and Tobago; Kerneka Waldron; Tyriq Horsford; Aquila St. Louis; Jahi Hernandez	51.75

== Medal table (unofficial) ==
* Host nation (British Virgin Islands)

Rank	Nation	Gold	Silver	Bronze	Total
1	Barbados	9	6	3	18
2	Guadeloupe	3	4	3	10
3	Puerto Rico	3	3	0	6
4	Bahamas	3	1	2	6
5	Grenada	2	2	2	6
6	Trinidad and Tobago	2	1	2	5
7	Jamaica	2	0	3	5
8	Curaçao	1	4	1	6
9	Saint Kitts and Nevis	1	2	1	4
10	Dominican Republic	1	1	3	5
11	Saint Vincent and the Grenadines	1	0	1	2
12	Cayman Islands	1	0	0	1
12	Martinique	1	0	0	1
14	Anguilla	0	2	3	5
15	Bermuda	0	2	1	3
15	British Virgin Islands*	0	2	1	3
17	U.S. Virgin Islands	0	1	1	2
18	Aruba	0	0	1	1
18	El Salvador	0	0	1	1
18	Mexico	0	0	1	1
Totals (20 entries)		30	31	30	91

== Team trophies ==
Event	Gold		Silver		Bronze	
Boys and Girls Overall	Barbados; Ramarco Thompson; Mario Burke; Danielle Scantlebury; Jalisa Burrowes; Christopher Taitt; Ryan Vickers; Tiana Bowen; Cristanna McConney	27,290	Bahamas; Kinard Rolle; Nitchev Casseus; Iasha Taylor; Andira Ferguson; Branson Rolle; Christopher Johnson; Blayre Catalyn; Deajha Moss	27,027	Trinidad and Tobago; Andwuelle Wright; Shane Hector; Alisha St. Louis; Ayana Glasgow; Tyriq Horsford; Jahi Hernandez; Aquila St. Louis; Kerneka Waldron	26,704
Boys Team	Barbados; Ramarco Thompson; Mario Burke; Christopher Taitt; Ryan Vickers	15,650	Dominican Republic; Juan Francisco Nunez; Tony Solis; Rafi Ventura Tavarez; Yeison De Jesus Ortiz	14,752	Bahamas; Kinard Rolle; Nitchev Casseus; Branson Rolle; Christopher Johnson	14,692
Boys 13-14	Barbados; Ramarco Thompson; Mario Burke	10,009	Grenada; Kimone Paterson; Anderson Peters	9,705	Dominican Republic; Juan Francisco Nunez; Tony Solis	9,262
Boys 11-12	Puerto Rico; Xavier Vazquez; Gabriel Feliciano Bonilla	5,819	Trinidad and Tobago; Tyriq Horsford; Jahi Hernandez	5,722	Barbados; Christopher Taitt; Ryan Vickers	5,641
Girls Team	Bahamas; Iasha Taylor; Andira Ferguson; Blayre Catalyn; Deajha Moss	12,335	Curaçao; Nargelis Statia; Naeemah Isidora; Glenka Antonia; Eunice Dolorita	12,222	Trinidad and Tobago; Alisha St. Louis; Ayana Glasgow; Aquila St. Louis; Kerneka Waldron	12,030
Girls 13-14	/Guadeloupe; Laure-Anne Jabin; Yanis David	7,746	Curaçao; Nargelis Statia; Naeemah Isidora	7,552	Bahamas; Iasha Taylor; Andira Ferguson	7,438
Girls 11-12	Anguilla; Tarah Niles; Janique Fleming	5,280	Barbados; Tiana Bowen; Cristanna McConney	5,121	British Virgin Islands; J'Nae Wong; Arianna Hayde	4,987
