= Hexathlon =

Sport event

An hexathlon is a competition consisting of six events. In principle, this could refer to any such six-event competition in a given sport or contest, but the conventional usage in track and field refers to a specific set of events. A competitor in a hexathlon is referred to as a hexathlete.

== Track and field ==
In track and field, is a combined event made up of six events: 75-meter hurdles, long jump, javelin throw, high jump, shot put, and 800 meters. The word "hexathlon" derives from the Greek words hexa, the number 6, and athlos or athlon, meaning "contest" or "prize". A hexathlon is not often organized, mostly at youth levels. It was on the program of the Central American and Caribbean Age Group Championships in Athletics until 2007, South American Youth Championships in Athletics until 1998 and the South American Junior Championships in Athletics until 1974.
