= 2013 Central American and Caribbean Age Group Championships in Athletics =

XV Central American and Caribbean Age Group Championships
- Dates: 29–30 June
- Host city: Willemstad, Curaçao
- Venue: Sentro Deportivo Korsou
- Level: Age Group 11-14 years
- Participation: 156 athletes from 23 nations

The 15th Central American and Caribbean Age Group Championships in Athletics were hosted by the Curaçaose Atletiek Bond (CAB), and were held at the Sentro Deportivo Korsou in Brievengat, Curaçao between July 29–30, 2013.

== Medal summary ==
Complete results were published.

Event	Gold		Silver		Bronze	
Boys 13-14
80 metres	Xavier Vásquez (PUR)	9.38 (wind: +1.5 m/s)	Kairon Bain (BAH)	9.43 (wind: +1.5 m/s)	Tyriq Horsford (TRI)	9.45 (wind: +0.2 m/s)
1200 metres	Dominique Zwiep (CUR)	3:40.93	(Guadeloupe) /Kévin Robinet (GLP)	3:44.55	Kwan Kavil Stewart (VIN)	3:44.76
80 metres hurdles	(Guadeloupe) /Enzo Hodebar (GLP)	10.89 (wind: +3.4 m/s)	Jesús Rafael Gómez (VEN)	11.32 (wind: +3.4 m/s)	Branson Rolle (BAH)	11.37 (wind: +3.4 m/s)
High jump	(Guadeloupe) /Enzo Hodebar (GLP)	1.84m	Sebastián Romero (PUR)	1.81m	Franklyn Stanisclaus (TRI)	1.79m
Long jump	(Guadeloupe) /Enzo Hodebar (GLP)	6.54m (wind: -1.9 m/s)	Sebastián Romero (PUR)	6.25m (wind: +1.6 m/s)	Najean Jean (LCA)	6.04m (wind: +1.3 m/s)
Shot put	(Guadeloupe) /Enzo Hodebar (GLP)	15.23m	Tyriq Horsford (TRI)	14.61m	Dante Ryan (ATG)	13.99m
Baseball Throw	Illich Jaramillo (VEN)	94.67m	Tyriq Horsford (TRI)	94.59m	Ahmed Joseph (ISV)	88.23
Heptathlon	Sebastián Romero (PUR)	5302 pts	(Guadeloupe) /Enzo Hodebar (GLP)	5226 pts	Tyriq Horsford (TRI)	5214 pts
Girls 13-14
80 metres	Aquilla St. Louis (TRI)	10.26 (wind: +1.4 m/s)	Doneisha Anderson (BAH); J'Nae Wong (IVB)	10.27 (wind: +0.5 m/s); 10.27 (wind: +1.4 m/s)		
1000 metres	Doneisha Anderson (BAH)	3:15.96	Shafiqua Maloney (VIN)	3:16.00	(Guadeloupe) /Iman Berthelot (GLP)	3:20.08
60 metres hurdles	Chris Ann Bryan (JAM)	9.17 w (wind: +2.6 m/s)	(Guadeloupe) /Iman Berthelot (GLP)	9.37 w (wind: +2.6 m/s)	Nancy Sandoval (ESA)	9.51 w (wind: +2.6 m/s)
High jump	Glenka Antonia (CUR)	1.68m	Doneisha Anderson (BAH); Zinedine Russell (JAM); Maria Valent Parra (VEN); Anya Akili (TRI)	1.60 m		
Long jump	(Guadeloupe) /Iman Berthelot (GLP)	5.39m (wind: -0.8 m/s)	Nancy Sandoval (ESA)	5.35m (wind: +1.1 m/s)	Kristia Collie (BAH)	5.23m (wind: -2.1 m/s)
Shot put	Kristia Collie (BAH)	10.45m	Shafiqua Maloney (VIN)	9.99m	Candace Croes (ARU)	9.97m
Baseball Throw	Melissa Charles (DOM)	65.27m	Kristia Collie (BAH)	60.62m	Anisa Hodge-Connor (AIA)	60.56m
Heptathlon	Shafiqua Maloney (VIN)	4204 pts	Doneisha Anderson (BAH)	4151 pts	(Guadeloupe) /Iman Berthelot (GLP)	4058 pts
Mixed 13-14
4 x 100 metres relay	Bahamas; Branson Rolle; Doneisha Anderson; Kristia Collie; Kairon Bain	47.27	Trinidad and Tobago; Aquilla St. Louis; Tyriq Horsford; Anya Akili; Franklyn Stanisclaus	47.95	Saint Kitts and Nevis; Jakeisha Leader; Tywanya Robinson; Shaquan Abott; Curvis Collins	48.33

Event	Gold		Silver		Bronze	
Boys 11-12
60 metres	Antonio Maynard (LCA)	7.84 (wind: +1.5 m/s)	(Guadeloupe) /Jérémy Berquier (GLP)	7.90 (wind: +1.5 m/s)	John-Mark Rainford (JAM)	7.92 w (wind: +4.4 m/s)
1000 metres	(Guadeloupe) /Jérémy Berquier (GLP)	3:07.65	Pedro Miguel Martínez (VEN)	3:09.62	Daniel Mejicano (VEN)	3:12.46
Long jump	Antonio Maynard (LCA)	5.25m (wind: +0.0 m/s)	Blaize Darling (BAH)	5.19m (wind: +0.0 m/s)	Sheldon Noble (ATG)	4.99m (wind: -0.1 m/s)
High jump	Torian Waldron (BAR)	1.56m	Sheldon Noble (ATG)	1.53m	Blaize Darling (BAH)	1.50m
Baseball Throw	Pedro Miguel Martínez (VEN)	72.26m	Daniel Mejicano (VEN)	67.72m	Razeem Richards (ATG)	62.34m
Pentathlon	Daniel Mejicano (VEN)	3301 pts	(Guadeloupe) /Jérémy Berquier (GLP)	3214 pts	Blaize Darling (BAH)	3167 pts
Girls 11-12
60 metres	Julien Alfred (LCA)	8.09 (wind: -0.1 m/s)	Beyonce DeFreitas (IVB)	8.25 (wind: +0.0 m/s)	Zekiah Lewis (BER); Akayla Morris (BAR); Kennedy Culmer (BAH)	8.26 (wind: +1.1 m/s); 8.26 (wind: +0.0 m/s); 8.26 (wind: -0.1 m/s)
800 metres	Jarencia Jeffers (SKN)	2:33.84	Zamesha Myle (VIN)	2:34.69	Mikaela Outerbridge (BER)	2:35.66
Long jump	Zekiah Lewis (BER)	4.87m (wind: +0.7 m/s)	Charissa Moore (BAR); Beyonce DeFreitas (IVB)	4.79m (wind: -1.9 m/s); 4.79m (wind: +0.8 m/s)		
High jump	Zekiah Lewis (BER); Safiyah John (TRI)	1.45m			Charissa Moore (BAR)	1.43m
Baseball Throw	Julien Alfred (LCA)	51.52m	Berny Dotel (DOM)	50.43m	Juleika Torres (PUR)	50.23m
Pentathlon	Charissa Moore (BAR)	2860 pts	Zekiah Lewis (BER)	2773 pts	Beyonce DeFreitas (IVB)	2770 pts
4 x 100 metres relay	Bahamas; Tamasio Bullard; Kennedy Culmer; Tylar Lightbourn; Blaize Darling	51.19	Jamaica; Kelsey Christian; Eleon Wright; Tatyanna Palmer; John-Mark Rainford	51.20	Saint Lucia; Sanjay Jean; Antonio Maynard; Faith Emmanuel; Julien Alfred	52.37

== Team trophies ==
The results for the team trophies were published.

Event	Gold		Silver		Bronze	
Boys and Girls Overall	Bahamas; Branson Rolle; Karon Bain; Doneisha Anderson; Kristia Collie; Blaize Darling; Tamasio Bullard; Tylar Lightbourn; Kennedy Culmer	28545 pts	Trinidad and Tobago; Tyriq Horsford; Franklyn Stanisclaus; Aquilla St. Louis; Anya Akili; Avindale Smith; Joel Andrews; Antonia Sealy; Safiyah John	27816 pts	Barbados; Micah Shepherd; Anderson Greaves; Tiana Bowen; Shonita Brome; Torian Waldron; Shem Williams; Charissa Moore; Akayla Morris	27756 pts
Infantil A (13-14)	Bahamas; Branson Rolle; Karon Bain; Doneisha Anderson; Kristia Collie	17519 pts	/Guadeloupe; Enzo Hodebar; Kévin Robinet; Iman Berthelot; Laurelle Caban	17314 pts	Trinidad and Tobago; Tyriq Horsford; Franklyn Stanisclaus; Aquilla St. Louis; Anya Akili	17138 pts
Infantil B (11-12)	Barbados; Torian Waldron; Shem Williams; Charissa Moore; Akayla Morris	11219 pts	Bahamas; Blaize Darling; Tamasio Bullard; Tylar Lightbourn; Kennedy Culmer	11026 pts	Curaçao; Daniel Balentina; Suehandric Paulina; Nasya Ramirez; Rishmylady Felicia	10831 pts
Boys Team	Venezuela; Jesús Rafael Gómez; Illich Jaramillo; Daniel Mejicano; Pedro Miguel Martínez	16020 pts	Bahamas; Branson Rolle; Karon Bain; Blaize Darling; Tamasio Bullard	15757 pts	Trinidad and Tobago; Tyriq Horsford; Franklyn Stanisclaus; Avindale Smith; Joel Andrews	15427 pts
Boys 13-14	Trinidad and Tobago; Tyriq Horsford; Franklyn Stanisclaus	9947 pts	Curaçao; Ruwensley Hansen; Dominique Zwiep	9694 pts	Bahamas; Branson Rolle; Karon Bain	9613 pts
Boys 11-12	Venezuela; Daniel Mejicano; Pedro Miguel Martínez	6460 pts	Bahamas; Blaize Darling; Tamasio Bullard	6144 pts	Jamaica; John-Mark Rainford; Eleon Wright	5968 pts
Girls Team	Bahamas; Doneisha Anderson; Kristia Collie; Tylar Lightbourn; Kennedy Culmer	12788 pts	Barbados; Tiana Bowen; Shonita Brome; Charissa Moore; Akayla Morris	12728 pts	/Guadeloupe; Iman Berthelot; Laurelle Caban; Élodie Ardenoy; Sorenza Phaan	12577 pts
Girls 13-14	Bahamas; Doneisha Anderson; Kristia Collie	7906 pts	/Guadeloupe; Iman Berthelot; Laurelle Caban	7862 pts	Jamaica; Keneva Headley; Zinedine Russell	7508 pts
Girls 11-12	Barbados; Charissa Moore; Akayla Morris	5409 pts	Curaçao; Nasya Ramirez; Rishmylady Felicia	5369 pts	Saint Kitts and Nevis; Jarencia Jeffers; Olujede Bridgewater	5213 pts

== Medal table (unofficial) ==
* Host nation (Curaçao)

Rank	Nation	Gold	Silver	Bronze	Total
1	/Guadeloupe	6	5	2	13
2	Bahamas	4	6	5	15
3	Saint Lucia	4	0	2	6
4	Venezuela	3	4	1	8
5	Trinidad and Tobago	2	4	3	9
6	Puerto Rico	2	2	1	5
7	Barbados	2	1	2	5
7	Bermuda	2	1	2	5
9	Curaçao*	2	0	0	2
10	Saint Vincent and the Grenadines	1	3	1	5
11	Jamaica	1	2	1	4
12	Dominican Republic	1	1	0	2
13	Saint Kitts and Nevis	1	0	1	2
14	British Virgin Islands	0	3	1	4
15	Antigua and Barbuda	0	1	3	4
16	El Salvador	0	1	1	2
17	Anguilla	0	0	1	1
17	Aruba	0	0	1	1
17	U.S. Virgin Islands	0	0	1	1
Totals (19 entries)		31	34	29	94

== Participation ==
The published competition results report the participation of 156 athletes in 23 teams from 22 countries. The announced athletes from the Cayman Islands, Dominica, and Honduras did not appear in the results lists.

- Anguilla (8)
- Antigua and Barbuda (6)
- Aruba (8)
- Bahamas (8)
- Barbados (8)
- Bermuda (8)
- British Virgin Islands (8)
- Curaçao A (8)
- Curaçao B (8)
- Dominican Republic (8)
- El Salvador (2)
- Grenada (4)
- /Guadeloupe (8)
- Haiti (4)
- Jamaica (8)
- Puerto Rico (6)
- Saint Kitts and Nevis (8)
- Saint Lucia (7)
- Saint Vincent and the Grenadines (6)
- Sint Maarten (6)
- Trinidad and Tobago (8)
- U.S. Virgin Islands (4)
- Venezuela (7)
