= 2015 Central American and Caribbean Age Group Championships in Athletics =

XVI Central American and Caribbean Age Group Championships
- Dates: 18–19 July
- Host city: Port of Spain, Trinidad and Tobago
- Venue: Hasely Crawford Stadium
- Level: Age Groups 11-12 and 13-14 years
- Events: 28
- Participation: 103 athletes from 16 nations
- Records set: 9

The 16th Central American and Caribbean Age Group Championships in Athletics (Spanish: Campeonato Centroamericano y del Caribe Infantil de Pruebas Combinadas), were hosted by the National Association of Athletics Administrations of Trinidad & Tobago (NAAATT), and were held at Hasely Crawford Stadium in Port of Spain, Trinidad and Tobago, between July 18–19, 2015.

== Medal summary ==
Complete results were published.

Event	Gold		Silver		Bronze	
Boys 13-14
80 metres	Tyler Toussaint; Saint Lucia	9.32 (wind: +1.4 m/s)	Antonio Watson; Jamaica	9.41 (wind: +1.1 m/s)	Avindale Smith; Trinidad and Tobago	9.51 (wind: +0.1 m/s)
1200 metres	Antonio Watson; Jamaica	3:33.24	Jumulah Estwick; Barbados	3:36.13	Jared Sylvester; Grenada	3:37.72
80 metres hurdles (84.0 cm)	Avindale Smith; Trinidad and Tobago	11.94 (wind: -1.3 m/s)	Tyler Toussaint; Saint Lucia	12.01 (wind: -0.9 m/s)	Shaun Miller; Bahamas	12.05 (wind: -1.3 m/s)
High jump	Benjamin Clarke; Bahamas	1.98m CR	Andreson Jean; Anguilla; Shaun Miller; Bahamas; Kgevin Kook; Curaçao	1.75m		
Long jump	Shacquille Lowe; Jamaica	6.44m (wind: -2.1 m/s)	Benjamin Clarke; Bahamas	6.29m (wind: +0.2 m/s)	Avindale Smith; Trinidad and Tobago	6.16m (wind: +1.2 m/s)
Shot put (3 kg)	Enrique Babb; Barbados	15.35m CR	Antonio Watson; Jamaica	13.71m	Lynolson Jean; Anguilla	13.39m
Baseball Throw (400g)	Enrique Babb; Barbados	77.93m	Jammy Richardson; Grenada	72.85m	Kgevin Kook; Curaçao	69.93m
Heptathlon	Shacquille Lowe; Jamaica	4880	Antonio Watson; Jamaica	4861	Enrique Babb; Barbados	4855
Girls 13-14
80 metres	Julien Alfred; Saint Lucia	9.63 (wind: -0.2 m/s) CR	Megan Moss; Bahamas	9.94 (wind: -0.2 m/s)	Akayla Morris; Barbados	9.98 (wind: -0.2 m/s)
1000 metres	Mikaela Smith; U.S. Virgin Islands	3:16.01	Megan Moss; Bahamas	3:18.40	Charissa Moore; Barbados	3:21.65
60 metres hurdles (76 cm)	Julien Alfred; Saint Lucia	9.01 (wind: -2.2 m/s) CR	Ackera Nugent; Jamaica	9.38 (wind: -1.2 m/s)	Safiya John; Trinidad and Tobago	9.48 (wind: -0.9 m/s)
High jump	Charissa Moore; Barbados; Julien Alfred; Saint Lucia; Nasya Ramirez; Curaçao	1.55m				
Long jump	Charissa Moore; Barbados	5.33m (wind: +1.2 m/s)	Antonia Sealy; Trinidad and Tobago	5.31m (wind: +1.0 m/s)	Akayla Morris; Barbados	5.30m (wind: 0.0 m/s)
Shot put (3 kg)	Julien Alfred; Saint Lucia	10.13m	Antonia Sealy; Trinidad and Tobago	10.09m	Joachima Jonis; Curaçao	9.71m
Baseball Throw (400g)	Joniar Thomas; Grenada	54.80m	Tylar Lightbourne; Bahamas	54.61m	Antonia Sealy; Trinidad and Tobago	52.26m
Heptathlon	Julien Alfred; Saint Lucia	4466 CR	Antonia Sealy; Trinidad and Tobago	4139	Charissa Moore; Barbados	4057
Mixed 13-14
4 x 100 metres relay	Saint Lucia; Tyler Toussaint; Desray Desir; Antonio Maynard; Julien Alfred	46.63 CR	Jamaica; Ackera Nugent; Shacquille Lowe; Antonio Watson; Beyonce Bucknor	47.32	Bahamas; Megan Moss; Shaun Miller; Benjamin Clarke; Tylar Lightbourne	47.74

Event	Gold		Silver		Bronze	
Boys 11-12
60 metres	Terrique Stennett; Jamaica	7.59 (wind: -1.0 m/s) CR	Malaki Smith; British Virgin Islands	7.71 (wind: +0.4 m/s)	Davon Johnson; Bahamas	7.73 (wind: -0.5 m/s)
1000 metres	Terrique Stennett; Jamaica	3:07.83	Jordan Pope; Trinidad and Tobago	3:09.01	Brandon Fan Fan; Barbados	3:14.26
High jump	Mekale Gordon; Jamaica	1.59m	Izaiah Farrington; Bahamas	1.54m	Matthew Sophia; Curaçao; Aren Spencer; Barbados	1.53m
Long jump	Terrique Stennett; Jamaica	5.34m (wind: 0.0 m/s) CR	Mekale Gordon; Jamaica	5.14m (wind: +0.7 m/s)	Aren Spencer; Barbados	4.97m (wind: -0.5 m/s)
Baseball Throw (400g)	Daniel Qiu; Trinidad and Tobago	61.04m	Tyrique Bushay; Saint Vincent and the Grenadines	54.60m	Malaki Smith; British Virgin Islands	53.88m
Pentathlon	Terrique Stennett; Jamaica	3286	Mekale Gordon; Jamaica	3234	Jordan Pope; Trinidad and Tobago	3155
Girls 11-12
60 metres	Paige Stuart; Bahamas	8.21 (wind: 0.0 m/s)	Joy Edward; Saint Lucia	8.22 (wind: +1.0 m/s)	Mac Kayla McDowall; Saint Vincent and the Grenadines	8.35 (wind: 0.0 m/s)
800 metres	Grandeisha Cain; Saint Vincent and the Grenadines	2:35.11	Joanna Benita; Curaçao	2:35.20	Sethreanda Williams; Anguilla	2:37.26
High jump	Anthaya Charlton; Bahamas; Aurélia Cestor /Martinique; Malika Coutain; Trinidad and Tobago; Paige Stuart; Bahamas; Tanisha Dall; Curaçao	1.35m				
Long jump	Julisa Jones-Smith; Barbados	4.73m (wind: 0.0 m/s)	Jenell Smith; Anguilla	4.67m (wind: 0.0 m/s)	Paige Stuart; Bahamas	4.59m (wind: 0.0 m/s)
Baseball Throw (400g)	Joanna Benita; Curaçao	51.63m CR	Tyannah Lake; U.S. Virgin Islands	46.87m	Julisa Jones-Smith; Barbados	45.15m
Pentathlon	Paige Stuart; Bahamas	2614	Joanna Benita; Curaçao	2601	Julisa Jones-Smith; Barbados	2508
Mixed 11-12
4 x 100 metres relay	Jamaica; Woizero Richards; Kaylea-Ashley McKenzie; Mekale Gordon; Terrique Stennett	49.93	Bahamas; Paige Stuart; Davon Johnson; Izaiah Farrington; Anthaya Charlton	50.56	Trinidad and Tobago; Xea Bruce; Jordan Pope; Malika Coutain; Daniel Qiu	51.06

== Team trophies ==
Event	Gold		Silver		Bronze	
Boys and Girls Overall	Jamaica; Shacquille Lowe; Antonio Watson; Ackera Nugent; Beyonce Bucknor; Terrique Stennett; Mekale Gordon; Woizero Richards; Kaylea-Ashley McKenzie	28,360	Trinidad and Tobago; Avindale Smith; Joel Andrews; Antonia Sealy; Safiya John; Jordan Pope; Daniel Qiu; Xea Bruce; Malika Coutain	28,236	Barbados; Enrique Babb; Jumulah Estwick; Charissa Moore; Akayla Morris; Aren Spencer; Brandon Fan Fan; Julisa Jones-Smith; Chiara Chase	28,205
Infantil A (13-14)	Barbados; Enrique Babb; Jumulah Estwick; Charissa Moore; Akayla Morris	17,471	Trinidad and Tobago; Avindale Smith; Joel Andrews; Antonia Sealy; Safiya John	17,376	Saint Lucia; Tyler Toussaint; Antonio Maynard; Julien Alfred; Desray Desir	17,283
Infantil B (11-12)	Jamaica; Terrique Stennett; Mekale Gordon; Woizero Richards; Kaylea-Ashley McKenzie	11,118	Bahamas; Davon Johnson; Izaiah Farrington; Paige Stuart; Anthaya Charlton	10,948	Trinidad and Tobago; Jordan Pope; Daniel Qiu; Xea Bruce; Malika Coutain	10,860
Boys Team	Jamaica; Shacquille Lowe; Antonio Watson; Terrique Stennett; Mekale Gordon	16,261	Bahamas; Benjamin Clarke; Shaun Miller; Davon Johnson; Izaiah Farrington	15,506	Barbados; Enrique Babb; Jumulah Estwick; Aren Spencer; Brandon Fan Fan	15,442
Boys 13-14	Jamaica; Shacquille Lowe; Antonio Watson	9741	Barbados; Enrique Babb; Jumulah Estwick	9549	Bahamas; Benjamin Clarke; Shaun Miller	9504
Boys 11-12	Jamaica; Terrique Stennett; Mekale Gordon	6520	Trinidad and Tobago; Jordan Pope; Daniel Qiu	6042	Bahamas; Davon Johnson; Izaiah Farrington	6002
Girls Team	Trinidad and Tobago; Antonia Sealy; Safiya John; Xea Bruce; Malika Coutain	12,930	Curaçao; Joachima Jonis; Nasya Ramirez; Joanna Benita; Tanisha Dall	12,902	Barbados; Charissa Moore; Akayla Morris; Julisa Jones-Smith; Chiara Chase	12,763
Girls 13-14	Trinidad and Tobago; Antonia Sealy; Safiya John	8112	Saint Lucia; Julien Alfred; Desray Desir	7968	Barbados; Charissa Moore; Akayla Morris	7922
Girls 11-12	Curaçao; Joanna Benita; Tanisha Dall	5059	Bahamas; Paige Stuart; Anthaya Charlton	4946	Anguilla; Sethreanda Williams; Jenell Smith	4942

== Medal table (unofficial) ==
* Host nation (Trinidad and Tobago)

Rank	Nation	Gold	Silver	Bronze	Total
1	Jamaica	9	7	0	16
2	Saint Lucia	7	2	0	9
3	Bahamas	5	7	4	16
4	Barbados	5	1	10	16
5	Trinidad and Tobago*	3	4	6	13
6	Curaçao	3	3	3	9
7	Grenada	1	1	1	3
7	Saint Vincent and the Grenadines	1	1	1	3
9	/Martinique	1	0	0	1
10	Anguilla	0	2	2	4
11	British Virgin Islands	0	1	1	2
12	U.S. Virgin Islands	0	1	0	1
Totals (12 entries)		35	30	28	93

== Participation ==
According to an unofficial count, 103 athletes from 16 countries participated.

- Anguilla (7)
- Antigua and Barbuda (5)
- Aruba (5)
- Bahamas (8)
- Barbados (8)
- British Virgin Islands (6)
- Curaçao (8)
- Grenada (4)
- Honduras (1)
- Jamaica (8)
- /Martinique (7)
- Saint Lucia (8)
- Saint Vincent and the Grenadines (8)
- Trinidad and Tobago (8)
- Turks and Caicos Islands (6)
- U.S. Virgin Islands (6)
