= 2009 Central American and Caribbean Age Group Championships in Athletics =

XIII Central American and Caribbean Age Group Championships
- Dates: 18–19 June
- Host city: Nassau, Bahamas (The Bahamas)
- Venue: Thomas Robinson Stadium
- Level: Age Group 11-14 years
- Participation: 125 athletes from 19 nations

The 13th Central American and Caribbean Age Group Championships in Athletics was hosted by the Bahamas Association of Athletic Associations (BAAA) on June 18–19, 2009. It was originally to be held in Freeport, Grand Bahama. However, it had to be relocated to Nassau, New Providence, because the reconstruction of the stadium in Freeport could not be completed in time. This is already the third time, that the event is hosted by the Bahamas, after 1987 in Nassau, New Providence and 2001 in Freeport, Grand Bahama.

== Participation ==
The competition results are published.

Although 20 teams were announced to participate, only 19 appeared in the listed results. Athletes from Anguilla, Honduras, St. Vincent and the Grenadines, and Turks and Caicos Islands did not earn a medal.

== Medal summary ==
Event	Gold		Silver		Bronze	
Boys 13-14
80 metres	Delano Davis (BAH)	9.36	Jerrad Mason (BAR)	9.40	Dudly Boeldak (AHO)	9.69
80 metres hurdles	Dudly Boeldak (AHO)	11.73	Jerrad Mason (BAR)	11.80	Brandon Andrew (IVB)	11.88
1200 metres	Jerrad Mason (BAR)	3:22.11	Giandro Martes (AHO)	3:37.12	Dario Scantlebury (BAR)	3:41.08
Long jump	Bruce Degrilla (BER)	6.56m	Delano Davis (BAH)	6.18m	Dario Scantlebury (BAR)	6.03m
High jump	Dudly Boeldak (AHO)	1.78m	Dario Scantlebury (BAR); Maulford Smith (JAM)	1.75m 1.75m		
Baseball Throw	Damian Frank (DMA)	77.86m	Gerrio Rahming (BAH)	77.73m	Dudly Boeldak (AHO)	75.63m
Shot put	Dudly Boeldak (AHO)	14.18m	Dario Scantlebury (BAR)	13.50m	Jerrad Mason (BAR)	13.49m
Heptathlon	Jerrad Mason (BAR)	5339	Dario Scantlebury (BAR)	5155	Delano Davis (BAH)	4994
Girls 13-14
80 metres	Pedrya Seymour (BAH)	10.21	Shirnell Ettienne (TRI); Jelisa Nedd (ARU)	10.42; 10.42		
60 metres hurdles	Andrea Vargas Mena (CRC)	9.71	Latavia Coombs (JAM)	9.77	Rebeca Duarte Bodewig (ESA)	9.78
1000 metres	Génesis M. Cintron Natal (PUR)	3:09.84	Rosanna Sosa (DOM)	3:10.28	Andrea Vargas Mena (CRC)	3:10.58
Long jump	Tanice Watson (BAR)	5.37m	Rebeca Duarte Bodewig (ESA)	5.26m	Jelisa Nedd (ARU)	4.97m
High jump	Tanice Watson (BAR)	1.58m	Chelsey Linton (DMA)	1.55m	Amelia Gillispie (CAY)	1.51m
Baseball Throw	Luan Gabriel (DMA)	52.64m	Chelsey Linton (DMA)	46.25m	Tanice Watson (BAR)	42.52m
Shot put	Tanice Watson (BAR)	10.91m	Chelsey Linton (DMA)	10.87m	Rebeca Duarte Bodewig (ESA)	10.41m
Heptathlon	Chelsey Linton (DMA)	4221	Andrea Vargas Mena (CRC)	4130	Tanice Watson (BAR)	4082
Mixed 13-14
4x100 metres relay	Barbados; Desiree Joseph; Jerrad Mason; Dario Scantlebury; Tanice Watson	47.26	Bahamas; Pedrya Seymour; Gerrio Rahming; Delano Davis; Dannielle Gibson	47.70	Bermuda; Bruce Degrilla; Maliha Weeks; Esaiah Lister; Dale Eve	48.95

Event	Gold		Silver		Bronze	
Boys 11-12
60 metres	Mario Burke (BAR)	7.80	Ramarco Thompson (BAR)	7.97	Jaheel Hyde (JAM)	8.16
1000 metres	Juan Nunez (DOM)	2:54.04	Malique Smith (ISV)	3:09.52	Ramarco Thompson (BAR)	3:14.55
Long jump	Mario Burke (BAR)	5.05m	Ezequiel Suarez (PUR)	4.99m	Ramarco Thompson (BAR)	4.88m
High jump	Ramarco Thompson (BAR)	1.65m	Ezequiel Suarez (PUR)	1.50m	Kyron McMaster (IVB)	1.48m
Baseball Throw	Juan Nunez (DOM)	77.48m	Ramarco Thompson (BAR)	61.28m	Reginald Koc (ARU)	56.40m
Pentathlon	Ramarco Thompson (BAR)	3331	Juan Nunez (DOM)	3222	Mario Burke (BAR)	2988
Girls 11-12
60 metres	Britney Hew (JAM)	8.33	Tristan Evelyn (BAR)	8.36	Jalisa Burrowes (BAR)	8.38
800 metres	Jordan Bascome (BER)	2:30.11	Naeemah Isidora (AHO)	2:34.88	Julianne Dorothal (ARU)	2:35.89
Long jump	Lixandra Geerman (ARU)	4.78m	Jalisa Burrowes (BAR)	4.68m	Tristan Evelyn (BAR)	4.58m
High jump	Jordan Bascome (BER)	1.47m	Julianne Dorothal (ARU)	1.44m	Voshon Lynch (JAM)	1.41m
Baseball Throw	Naeemah Isidora (AHO)	48.55m	Tristan Evelyn (BAR)	46.58m	Ieisha Taylor (BAH)	41.12m
Pentathlon	Jordan Bascome (BER)	2680	Naeemah Isidora (AHO)	2557	Lixandra Geerman (ARU)	2555
Mixed 11-12
4x100 metres relay	Barbados; Jalisa Burrowes; Ramarco Thompson; Mario Burke; Tristan Evelyn	49.38	Jamaica; Voshon Lynch; Jaheel Hyde; Jerome Coombs; Britney Hew	52.24	Aruba; Julianne Dorothal; Jonathan Croes; Lixandra Geerman; Reginald Koc	53.51

== Medal table (unofficial) ==
* Host nation (Bahamas)

Rank	Nation	Gold	Silver	Bronze	Total
1	Barbados	11	10	10	31
2	Netherlands Antilles	4	3	2	9
3	Bermuda	4	0	1	5
4	Dominica	3	3	0	6
5	Bahamas*	2	4	1	7
6	Dominican Republic	2	2	0	4
7	Jamaica	1	3	2	6
8	Aruba	1	2	5	8
9	Puerto Rico	1	2	0	3
10	Costa Rica	1	1	1	3
11	El Salvador	0	1	2	3
12	Trinidad and Tobago	0	1	0	1
12	U.S. Virgin Islands	0	1	0	1
14	British Virgin Islands	0	0	2	2
15	Cayman Islands	0	0	1	1
Totals (15 entries)		30	33	27	90

== Team trophies ==
Event	Gold		Silver		Bronze	
Boys and Girls Overall	Barbados; Jerrad Mason; Dario Scantlebury; Tanice Watson; Desiree Joseph; Ramarco Thompson; Mario Burke; Jalisa Burrowes; Tristan Evelyn	29,317	Bahamas; Delano Davis; Gerrio Rahming; Dannielle Gibson; Pedrya Seymour; Julius Nottage; Timothy Wilson; Ieisha Taylor; Jeorjett Williams	26,954	Jamaica; Maulford Smith; Jourdan Edwards; Gleneve Grange; Latavia Coombs; Jerome Coombs; Jaheel Hyde; Britney Hew; Voshon Lynch	26,410
Boys Team	Barbados; Jerrad Mason; Dario Scantlebury; Ramarco Thompson; Mario Burke	16,813	Bahamas; Delano Davis; Gerrio Rahming; Julius Nottage; Timothy Wilson	14,895	Bermuda; Dale Eve; Bruce Degrilla; David Jones; Jahmari Sutton	14,335
Boys 13-14	Barbados; Jerrad Mason; Dario Scantlebury	10,494	Bahamas; Delano Davis; Gerrio Rahming	9,671	Bermuda; Dale Eve; Bruce Degrilla	9,209
Boys 11-12	Barbados; Ramarco Thompson; Mario Burke	6,319	Puerto Rico; Ezequiel Suarez; Dangel Cotto Serrano	5,712	Jamaica; Jerome Coombs; Jaheel Hyde	5,703
Girls Team	Barbados; Tanice Watson; Desiree Joseph; Jalisa Burrowes; Tristan Evelyn	12,504	Jamaica; Gleneve Grange; Latavia Coombs; Britney Hew; Voshon Lynch	12,195	Bahamas; Dannielle Gibson; Pedrya Seymour; Ieisha Taylor; Jeorjett Williams	12,059
Girls 13-14	Dominica; Chelsey Linton; Luan Gabriel	8,101	Barbados; Tanice Watson; Desiree Joseph	7,868	Jamaica; Gleneve Grange; Latavia Coombs	7,792
Girls 11-12	Aruba; Lixandra Geerman; Julianne Dorothal	5,081	Bermuda; Jordan Bascome; Aaliyah Nolan	5,065	Netherlands Antilles; Naeemah Isidora; Charlotte Rave	4,822
