= Darion Duncombe =

Bahamian sprinter

Personal information
- Born: January 16, 1990 (age 36)
Medal record
Athletics
Representing Bahamas
CAC Junior Championships (U17)
Bronze medal – third place	2006 Port of Spain	4 × 400 m relay
CARIFTA Games Junior (U20)
Gold medal – first place	2009 Vieux Fort	Heptathlon
CARIFTA Games Junior (U17)
Bronze medal – third place	2006 Les Abymes	4 × 400 m relay

Darion Duncombe (born January 16, 1990) is a male track and field athlete from Freeport, Bahamas who mainly competes in the 100 m and 200 and 400 m. He attended Sunland Baptist Academy and Tabernacle Baptist High on Grand Bahama before going on to compete for Rust College in Holly Springs, Mississippi. Duncombe won a gold medal in the Heptathlon at the 2009 CARIFTA Games in Vieux Fort, Saint Lucia. Duncombe also won a bronze medal in the boys 4 × 400 m relay at the 2006 Central American and Caribbean Junior Championships in Port of Spain, Trinidad.

Duncombe also played as a running back for the Bahamas American Football Jr team at the IFAF 2009 Junior World Championship Qualification Tournament game held in Panama City, Panama. Bahamas played the Mexico National team.

== Personal bests ==
Event	Time	Venue	Date
100 m	11.06 (+0.8)	Nassau, Bahamas	25 JUN 2010
200 m	22.19 (–0.5)	Nassau, Bahamas	20 FEB 2010
400 m	49.94	Freeport, Bahamas	13 MAR 2010
