= Central American and Caribbean Age Group Championships in Athletics =

International track and field athletics event

The Central American and Caribbean (CAC) Age Group Championships is an international track and field athletics event for the youngest athletes (boys and girls between the age of 11 and 14 years) organized by the Central American and Caribbean Athletic Confederation (CACAC). The CAC Age Group Championships started in 1985 in Curaçao and are held every two years. The intention was for athletes at that age to have experiences with a variety of events at that young age. It has witnessed the international debut of many future stars of the region such as Olympic and World Championship medalist Debbie Ferguson of the Bahamas and 2003 World 100m champion Kim Collins of St Kitts and Nevis.

== Events, Categories and Awards ==
Categories of the championships were subdue to changes. For the most recent event, competitions were held in the following categories:

Age group 11 – 12 years: “Infantile B” Pentathlon (Scoring will be in accordance with the Games Scoring tables for CACAC age group Competition):

- Boys: 60 meter dash, 1000 meters, Long Jump, High Jump, Baseball Throw.
- Girls: 60 meter dash, 800 meters, Long Jump, High Jump, Baseball Throw.
- Mixed 4x100 Meter Relay

Age group 13 – 14 years: “Infantile A” Heptathlon (Scoring will be in accordance with the Games Scoring tables for CACAC age group Competition):

- Boys: 80 meter dash, 1200 meters, 80 meter hurdles, Long Jump, High Jump, Baseball Throw, Shot Put.
- Girls: 80 meter dash, 1000 meters, 60 meter hurdles, Long Jump, High Jump, Baseball Throw, Shot Put.
- Mixed 4x100 Meter Relay

Each federation can enter individual athletes or teams consisting of two athletes in each category.

Medals are awarded for individuals for the first three places in each event in each category. Athletes ranked 4th to 8th receive a ribbon.

Trophies are awarded to teams in each category with the highest total number of cumulative points in the entire competition. Teams will also compete for the overall title. A trophy will be given to the country with the grand total amount of the sum of all the points of all the categories. This will include both divisions, male and female.

== Editions ==
Edition	Year	City	Country	Date	Venue	No. of Countries	No. of Athletes	Winner
1	1985	Curaçao	Netherlands Antilles					
2	1987	Nassau	Bahamas					
3	1989	Grand Cayman	Cayman Islands					
4	1991							
5	1993							
6	1995							
7	1997							
8	1999		Grenada	July				
9	2001	Freeport	Bahamas	6–8 July				Bahamas
10	2003	Caguas	Puerto Rico	18–19 July	Turabo University Track	12	74	Bahamas
11	2005	Santo Domingo	Dominican Republic	1–2 July	Centro Olímpico Juan Pablo Duarte			
12	2007	San Salvador	El Salvador	7–8 July	Estadio Nacional de la Flor Blanca	15	104	Barbados
13	2009	Nassau	Bahamas	18–19 June	Thomas Robinson Stadium	19	125	Barbados
14	2011	Tortola	British Virgin Islands	1–2 July	A.O. Shirley Recreation Ground	20	139	Barbados
15	2013	Willemstad	Curaçao	29–30 June	Sentro Deportivo Korsou	23	156	Bahamas
16	2015	Port of Spain	Trinidad and Tobago	18–19 July	Hasely Crawford Stadium	16	103	Jamaica

== Records ==
Records are set by athletes who are representing one of the Central American and Caribbean Athletic Confederation (CACAC) member states. The following list of records is assembled from the official results lists. At the 2011 championships, a total of 15 new records were established.

=== Infantile A (under 15) ===
==== Boys' U-15 records ====
Event	Record	Athlete	Nationality	Date	Meet
80 metres	9.09	Mario Burke	Barbados	1 July 2011	2011 Road Town, Tortola (British Virgin Islands)
1200 metres	3:22.11	Jerrad Mason	Barbados	19 June 2009	2009 Nassau (The Bahamas)
80 metres hurdles (84.0 cm)	11.42 (+1.5 m/s)	Tyriq Horsford	Trinidad and Tobago	30 June 2013	2013 Willemstad (Curaçao)
High jump	1.98 m	Benjamin Clarke	Bahamas	19 July 2015	2015 Port of Spain (Trinidad and Tobago)
Long jump	6.56 m	Bruce Degrilla	Bermuda	18 June 2009	2009 Nassau (The Bahamas)
Shot put (3 kg)	15.35 m	Enrique Babb	Barbados	18 July 2015	2015 Port of Spain (Trinidad and Tobago)
Baseball throw (400g)	94.67 m	Illich Jaramillo	Venezuela	30 June 2013	2013 Willemstad (Curaçao)
Heptathlon	5339 pts	Jerrad Mason	Barbados	18/19 June 2009	2009 Nassau (The Bahamas)
Heptathlon	9.40 (80 m), 13.49 m (shot put), 1.60 m (high jump) / 11.80 (80 m hurdles), 73.35 m (baseball throw), 5.95 m (long jump), 3:22.11 (1200 m)				

==== Girls' U-15 records ====
Event	Record	Athlete	Nationality	Date	Meet
80 metres	9.63 (−0.2 m/s)	Julien Alfred	Saint Lucia	18 July 2015	2015 Port of Spain (Trinidad and Tobago)
1000 metres	3:09.84	Génesis Cintron	Puerto Rico	19 June 2009	2009 Nassau (The Bahamas)
60 metres hurdles (76 cm)	9.01 (−2.2 m/s)	Julien Alfred	Saint Lucia	19 July 2015	2015 Port of Spain (Trinidad and Tobago)
High jump	1.68 m	Glenka Antonia	Curaçao	29 June 2013	2013 Willemstad (Curaçao)
Long jump	5.39 m (−0.8 m/s)	Iman Berthelot	/Guadeloupe	30 June 2013	2013 Willemstad (Curaçao)
Shot put (3 kg)	10.91 m	Tanice Watson	Barbados	18 June 2009	2009 Nassau (The Bahamas)
Baseball throw (400g)	65.27 m	Melissa José Charles	Dominican Republic	30 June 2013	2013 Willemstad (Curaçao)
Heptathlon	4466 pts	Julien Alfred	Saint Lucia	18/19 July 2015	2015 Port of Spain (Trinidad and Tobago)
Heptathlon	9.63 (−0.2 m/s) (80 m), 1.55 m (high jump), 10.13 m (shot put) / 9.01 (−2.2 m/s) (60 m hurdles), 5.14 m (+1.0 m/s) (long jump), 50.98 m (baseball throw), 3:36.75 (1000 m)				

==== Mixed U-15 records ====
Event	Record	Athlete	Nationality	Date	Meet
4 × 100 m relay	46.63	Tyler Toussaint; Desray Desir; Antonio Maynard; Julien Alfred	Saint Lucia	18 July 2015	2015 Port of Spain (Trinidad and Tobago)

=== Infantile B (under 13) ===
==== Boys' U-13 records ====
Event	Record	Athlete	Nationality	Date	Meet
60 metres	7.59 (−1.0 m/s)	Terrique Stennett	Jamaica	18 July 2015	2015 Port of Spain (Trinidad and Tobago)
1000 metres	2:54.04	Juan Nunez	Dominican Republic	19 June 2009	2009 Nassau (The Bahamas)
High jump	1.65 m	Ramarco Thompson	Barbados	18 June 2009	2009 Nassau (The Bahamas)
Long jump	5.34 m (±0.0 m/s)	Terrique Stennett	Jamaica	19 July 2015	2015 Port of Spain (Trinidad and Tobago)
Baseball throw (400g)	77.48 m	Juan Nunez	Dominican Republic	18 June 2009	2009 Nassau (The Bahamas)
Pentathlon	3331 pts	Ramarco Thompson	Barbados	18/19 June 2009	2009 Nassau (The Bahamas)
Pentathlon	7.97 (60 m), 61.28 m (baseball throw), 4.88 m (long jump) / 1.65 m (high jump), 3:14.55 (1000 m)				

==== Girls' U-13 records ====
Event	Record	Athlete	Nationality	Date	Meet
60 metres	8.09 (−0.1 m/s)	Julien Alfred	Saint Lucia	29 June 2013	2013 Willemstad (Curaçao)
800 metres	2:27.73	Jomarie Carmona Colon	Puerto Rico	2 July 2011	2011 Road Town, Tortola (British Virgin Islands)
High jump	1.52 m	Naomi Gestel	/Martinique	2 July 2011	2011 Road Town, Tortola (British Virgin Islands)
Long jump	4.87 m (−1.0 m/s)	Jomarie Carmona Colon	Puerto Rico	1 July 2011	2011 Road Town, Tortola (British Virgin Islands)
Baseball throw (400g)	51.63 m	Joanna Benita	Curaçao	18 July 2015	2015 Port of Spain (Trinidad and Tobago)
Pentathlon	2919 pts	Tiana Bowen	Barbados	1/2 July 2011	2011 Road Town, Tortola (British Virgin Islands)
Pentathlon	8.26 (+2.7 m/s) (60 m), 4.74 m (−1.5 m/s) (long jump), 31.33 m (baseball throw) / 1.49 m (high jump), 2:28.01 (800 m)				
Pentathlon	2860 pts	Charissa Moore	Barbados	29/30 June 2013	2013 Willemstad (Curaçao)
Pentathlon	8.47 (±0.0 m/s) (60 m), 4.79m (−1.9 m/s) (long jump), 42.66m (baseball throw) / 1.43m (high jump), 2:38.03 (800 m)				

w = wind assisted mark

=== Mixed U-13 records ===
Event	Record	Athlete	Nationality	Date	Meet
4 × 100 m relay	49.38	Jalisa Burrowes; Ramarco Thompson; Mario Burke; Evelyn Tristan	Barbados	June 2009	2009 Nassau (The Bahamas)

- Note: The records of the combined events are not confirmed by the cited sources.

== See also ==
List of Central American and Caribbean Age Group Championships records
