= 2016 IAAF World U20 Championships – Women's 100 metres =

The women's 100 metres event at the 2016 IAAF World U20 Championships was held at Zdzisław Krzyszkowiak Stadium on 20 and 21 July.

== Medalists ==
Gold	Candace Hill; United States
Silver	Ewa Swoboda; Poland
Bronze	Khalifa St. Fort; Trinidad and Tobago

== Records ==
Standing records prior to the 2016 IAAF World U20 Championships in Athletics
World Junior Record	Marlies Göhr (GDR)	10.88	Dresden, East Germany	1 July 1977
Championship Record	Veronica Campbell-Brown (JAM)	11.12	Santiago, Chile	18 October 2000
World Junior Leading	Candace Hill (USA)	11.09	Clovis, CA, United States	24 June 2016
Broken records during the 2016 IAAF World U20 Championships in Athletics
Championship Record	Candace Hill (USA)	11.12	Bydgoszcz, Poland	21 July 2016
World Junior Leading	Candace Hill (USA)	11.07	Bydgoszcz, Poland	21 July 2016
Championship Record	Candace Hill (USA)	11.07	Bydgoszcz, Poland	21 July 2016

== Results ==
=== Heats ===
Qualification: The first 3 of each heat (Q) and the 6 fastest times (q) qualified

Wind:
Heat 1: -1.6 m/s, Heat 2: -0.8 m/s, Heat 3: +1.7 m/s, Heat 4: +2.7 m/s, Heat 5: -0.4 m/s, Heat 6: +0.2 m/s

Rank	Heat	Lane	Name	Nationality	Time	Note
1	4	4	Ewa Swoboda	Poland	11.10w	Q
2	3	5	Imani-Lara Lansiquot	Great Britain	11.17	Q, PB
3	2	8	Candace Hill	United States	11.43	Q
4	1	4	Khalifa St. Fort	Trinidad and Tobago	11.50	Q
5	3	2	Celera Barnes	United States	11.51	Q
6	3	6	Zoe Hobbs	New Zealand	11.53	Q, NU20R
7	6	9	Evelyn Rivera	Colombia	11.55	Q
8	3	4	Vanesha Pusey	Jamaica	11.66	q
9	6	5	Katrin Fehm	Germany	11.60	Q
~~10~~	6	7	Basirah Sharifa Nasir	Bahrain	~~11.61~~	~~Q, PB~~, DQ
10	4	5	Mercy Ntia-Obong	Nigeria	11.62w	Q
11	1	3	Hannah Brier	Great Britain	11.63	Q
12	3	9	Jenea Spinks	Trinidad and Tobago	11.66	q
13	5	5	Iman Essa Jasim	Bahrain	11.66	Q
14	4	8	Diana Vaisman	Israel	11.69w	Q
15	5	4	Helene Ronningen	Norway	11.69	Q
16	4	2	Tamzin Thomas	South Africa	11.70w	q
17	3	3	Vilde Aasmo	Norway	11.71	q, PB
18	2	9	Chantal Butzek	Germany	11.73	Q
19	5	8	Lara Gómez	Spain	11.74	Q, PB
20	4	7	Shyvonne Roxborough	Canada	11.78w	q
21	3	7	L T Sha Fahie	British Virgin Islands	11.78	q, PB
22	2	2	Yana Kachur	Ukraine	11.78	Q
23	6	3	Zion Corrales-Nelson	Philippines	11.80	
24	1	9	Tristan Evelyn	Barbados	11.81	Q
25	6	4	Nikola Bendová	Czech Republic	11.84	
26	5	9	Cecilia Tamayo	Mexico	11.85	
26	2	5	Lucy Sheat	New Zealand	11.85	
28	5	2	Aniekeme Alphonsus	Nigeria	11.85	
29	1	6	Nelda Huggins	British Virgin Islands	11.87	
30	5	6	Cassidy Williamson	South Africa	11.90	
31	1	7	Jusztina Csóti	Hungary	11.96	
32	4	6	Kayla Anise Richardson	Philippines	11.97w	
33	4	9	Samantha Geddes	Australia	11.98w	
34	2	3	Veronika Palicková	Czech Republic	12.02	
35	2	6	Patrice Moody	Jamaica	12.02	
36	6	8	Klaudia Adamek	Poland	12.06	
37	6	6	Romina Cifuentes	Ecuador	12.17	
38	1	8	Chinque Thompson	Canada	12.18	
39	5	7	Kugapriya Chandran	Singapore	12.30	
40	1	5	Nia Jack	United States Virgin Islands	12.33	
41	5	3	Im Lan Loi	Macau	12.43	
42	6	2	Denika Kassim	Comoros	12.45	
43	1	2	Iveta Urshini	Albania	12.64	PB
44	4	3	Zarinae Sapong	Northern Mariana Islands	13.36w	
45	2	7	Liliana Neto	Angola	13.46	PB
	2	4	Devine Parker	Bahamas	DNS	
	3	8	Mazoon Al-Alawi	Oman	DNS	

=== Semifinals ===
Qualification: The first 2 of each heat (Q) and the 2 fastest times (q) qualified

Wind:
Heat 1: +0.7 m/s, Heat 2: +2.0 m/s, Heat 3: +0.4 m/s

Rank	Heat	Lane	Name	Nationality	Time	Note
1	2	5	Candace Hill	United States	11.12	Q, CR
2	3	4	Ewa Swoboda	Poland	11.17	Q, NU20R
3	2	6	Khalifa St. Fort	Trinidad and Tobago	11.22	Q
4	1	5	Imani-Lara Lansiquot	Great Britain	11.24	Q
5	2	4	Hannah Brier	Great Britain	11.39	q, PB
6	1	4	Evelyn Rivera	Colombia	11.53	Q
7	2	7	Mercy Ntia-Obong	Nigeria	11.58	q
8	3	5	Iman Essa Jasim	Bahrain	11.58	Q
9	1	7	Katrin Fehm	Germany	11.59	
~~10~~	1	8	Basirah Sharifa Nasir	Bahrain	~~11.61~~	~~PB~~, DQ
10	1	9	Yana Kachur	Ukraine	11.62	
11	2	8	Diana Vaisman	Israel	11.66	NU20R
12	3	2	Vanesha Pusey	Jamaica	11.66	
13	3	9	Zoe Hobbs	New Zealand	11.67	
14	1	6	Helene Ronningen	Norway	11.69	
15	3	7	Celera Barnes	United States	11.70	
16	2	2	Tamzin Thomas	South Africa	11.71	
17	3	6	Chantal Butzek	Germany	11.74	
18	2	9	Lara Gómez	Spain	11.74	PB
19	1	2	Jenea Spinks	Trinidad and Tobago	11.81	
20	3	8	Tristan Evelyn	Barbados	11.84	
20	1	3	Shyvonne Roxborough	Canada	11.88	
22	2	3	Vilde Aasmo	Norway	11.89	
23	3	3	L T Sha Fahie	British Virgin Islands	11.91	

=== Final ===
Wind: +0.9

Rank	Lane	Name	Nationality	Time	Note
1st place, gold medalist(s)	4	Candace Hill	United States	11.07	CR, WU20L
2nd place, silver medalist(s)	6	Ewa Swoboda	Poland	11.12	NU20R
3rd place, bronze medalist(s)	5	Khalifa St. Fort	Trinidad and Tobago	11.18	
4	7	Imani-Lara Lansiquot	Great Britain	11.37	
5	8	Evelyn Rivera	Colombia	11.59	
6	2	Hannah Brier	Great Britain	11.60	
7	9	Iman Essa Jasim	Bahrain	11.60	
8	3	Mercy Ntia-Obong	Nigeria	11.79	
