= Halasima =

Halasima is a surname. Notable people with the surname include:

- Leka Halasima (born 2005), Tonga international rugby league footballer
- Taina Halasima (born 1997), Tongan sprinter
