= 2016 IAAF World Indoor Championships – Women's 60 metres =

Women's 60 metres at the 2016 IAAF World Indoor Championships
- Venue: Oregon Convention Center
- Dates: March 19
- Competitors: 44 from 35 nations
- Winning time: 7.02

Medalists
gold medal	Barbara Pierre	United States
silver medal	Dafne Schippers	Netherlands
bronze medal	Elaine Thompson	Jamaica

Video on YouTube Official Video

The women's 60 metres at the 2016 IAAF World Indoor Championships took place on March 19, 2016.

Coming into these championships, world 200 champion Dafne Schippers and Barbara Pierre shared the fastest time in the world at 7.00. During the heats both ran 7.02, but in the semis, Schippers' slow start made her vulnerable as Elaine Thompson beat her to the line.

In the final, the start proved to be important, Pierre got out well with Thompson, Michelle-Lee Ahye and Asha Philip. The number 4 sprinter in the season Marie Josée Ta Lou was literally left in the blocks, yet 5 steps into the race, she had drawn even with Schippers. After spotting the leaders a step, Schippers got into her superior top end speed and ran down everybody, except Pierre, Thompson losing silver in the last step.

== Results ==
=== Heats ===
Qualification: First 3 (Q) and next 6 fastest (q) qualified for the semifinals.

Rank	Heat	Name	Nationality	Time	Notes
1	6	Barbara Pierre	United States	7.07	Q
2	4	Michelle-Lee Ahye	Trinidad and Tobago	7.09	Q, NR
3	1	Elaine Thompson	Jamaica	7.09	Q, PB
4	4	Dina Asher-Smith	Great Britain	7.12	Q
5	2	Dafne Schippers	Netherlands	7.13	Q
6	2	Tori Bowie	United States	7.15	Q
7	5	Marie-Josée Ta Lou	Ivory Coast	7.17	Q
8	1	Asha Philip	Great Britain	7.18	Q
9	5	Jamile Samuel	Netherlands	7.19	Q
10	3	Tatjana Pinto	Germany	7.19	Q
11	3	Simone Facey	Jamaica	7.20	Q
12	1	Kelly-Ann Baptiste	Trinidad and Tobago	7.20	Q, SB
13	6	Rosângela Santos	Brazil	7.21	Q
14	3	Crystal Emmanuel	Canada	7.23	Q, PB
15	5	Ángela Tenorio	Ecuador	7.24	Q
16	2	LaVerne Jones-Ferrette	United States Virgin Islands	7.27	Q
17	6	Maja Mihalinec	Slovenia	7.28	Q
18	3	Olesya Povh	Ukraine	7.29	q
19	4	Gloria Hooper	Italy	7.28	Q, PB
20	5	Tahesia Harrigan-Scott	British Virgin Islands	7.30	q
21	5	Dutee Chand	India	7.30	q
22	2	Wei Yongli	China	7.31	q
23	4	Marika Popowicz-Drapała	Poland	7.32	q
24	6	Chantal Butzek	Germany	7.35	q
25	6	Carole Zahi	France	7.36	
26	1	Flings Owusu-Agyapong	Ghana	7.36	
27	3	Ashley Marshall	Barbados	7.38	
28	4	Tynia Gaither	Bahamas	7.41	
29	1	Agata Forkasiewicz	Poland	7.45	
30	5	Anasztázia Nguyen	Hungary	7.46	
31	4	Viktoriya Zyabkina	Kazakhstan	7.47	
32	3	Yuan Qiqi	China	7.48	
33	2	Adeline Gouenon	Ivory Coast	7.50	
34	6	Lam On Ki	Hong Kong	7.54	
35	2	Phobay Kutu-Akoi	Liberia	7.56	
36	2	Charlotte Wingfield	Malta	7.63	
37	1	Élodie Embony	Madagascar	7.65	PB
38	5	Aziza Sbaity	Lebanon	7.78	
39	4	Loi Im Lan	Macau	7.83	
40	6	Valentina Meredova	Turkmenistan	7.89	
41	3	Patricia Taea	Cook Islands	7.95	SB
42	1	Mariana Cress	Marshall Islands	8.51	SB
43	3	Zarinae Sapong	Northern Mariana Islands	8.70	PB
44	4	Kariman Abuljadayel	Saudi Arabia	9.48	NR
	1	Andrea Ivančević	Croatia	DNS	

=== Semifinals ===
Qualification: First 2 (Q) and next 2 fastest (q) qualified for the final.

Rank	Heat	Name	Nationality	Time	Notes
1	3	Elaine Thompson	Jamaica	7.04	Q, PB
2	1	Barbara Pierre	United States	7.06	Q
3	3	Dafne Schippers	Netherlands	7.08	Q
4	2	Michelle-Lee Ahye	Trinidad and Tobago	7.09	Q, =NR
5	2	Tori Bowie	United States	7.11	Q, PB
6	1	Dina Asher-Smith	Great Britain	7.11	Q, SB
7	3	Asha Philip	Great Britain	7.13	q
8	2	Marie-Josée Ta Lou	Ivory Coast	7.15	q
9	1	Jamile Samuel	Netherlands	7.16	
10	1	Kelly-Ann Baptiste	Trinidad and Tobago	7.16	SB
11	3	Rosângela Santos	Brazil	7.20	
12	3	Ángela Tenorio	Ecuador	7.21	NR
13	2	Simone Facey	Jamaica	7.21	
14	1	Tatjana Pinto	Germany	7.22	
15	2	Tahesia Harrigan-Scott	British Virgin Islands	7.23	
16	2	Crystal Emmanuel	Canada	7.23	PB
17	1	Olesya Povh	Ukraine	7.27	
18	3	Wei Yongli	China	7.28	
19	3	LaVerne Jones-Ferrette	United States Virgin Islands	7.33	
20	2	Maja Mihalinec	Slovenia	7.34	
21	1	Marika Popowicz-Drapała	Poland	7.34	
22	2	Chantal Butzek	Germany	7.45	
23	3	Dutee Chand	India	7.62	
	1	Gloria Hooper	Italy	DNS	

=== Final ===
The final was started at 19:53.

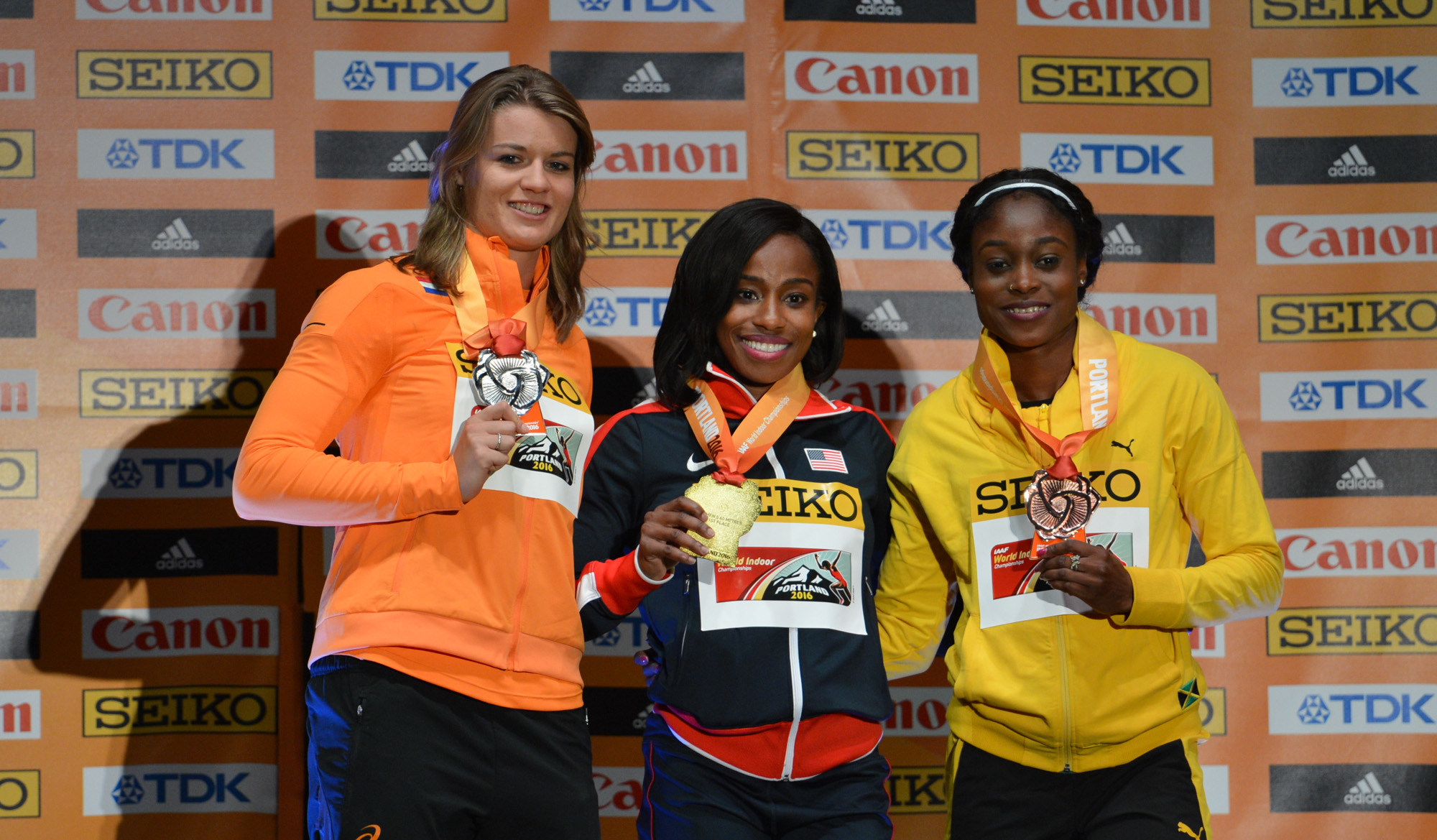
The medalists (left to right): Dafne Schippers, Barbara Pierre and Elaine Thompson

Rank	Lane	Name	Nationality	Time	Notes
1st place, gold medalist(s)	6	Barbara Pierre	United States	7.02	
2nd place, silver medalist(s)	5	Dafne Schippers	Netherlands	7.04	
3rd place, bronze medalist(s)	3	Elaine Thompson	Jamaica	7.06	
4	4	Michelle-Lee Ahye	Trinidad and Tobago	7.11	
5	1	Asha Philip	Great Britain	7.14	
6	8	Tori Bowie	United States	7.14	
7	2	Marie-Josée Ta Lou	Ivory Coast	7.29	
	7	Dina Asher-Smith	Great Britain	DNS	
