= Khalifa St. Fort =

Trinidadian sprinter

Personal information
- Born: 13 February 1998 (age 28) Florida, United States
- Height: 1.65 m (5 ft 5 in)
- Weight: 50 kg (110 lb)

Sport
- Country: Trinidad and Tobago
- Sport: Track and field
- Event: 4 × 100m relay
Medal record
World Championships
Bronze medal – third place	2015 Beijing	4×100 m relay
World Youth Championships
Silver medal – second place	2015 Cali	100 m
World Junior Championships
Bronze medal – third place	2016 Bydgoszcz	100 m
Central American and Caribbean Games
Silver medal – second place	2018 Barranquilla	100 m

Khalifa Halima St. Fort (born 13 February 1998) is a track and field sprinter who competes internationally for Trinidad and Tobago. She competes in the 100 metres and 200 metres.

Born in the United States to Tamika St. Fort, a native of San Fernando, Trinidad and Tobago, she grew up in Miami, Florida and attended St. Thomas Aquinas High School in Fort Lauderdale. She took up track and field at the age of thirteen, joining Miramar Optimist track and field club. While at high school she struggled to improve her sprinting and her father contacted Ato Boldon, a four-time Olympic medalist for Trinidad and Tobago, for assistance. Boldon decided to coach St. Fort and after a month she improved her best from 12.3 to 11.5 seconds, making her one of the top ranked sprinters for her age group globally.

St. Fort's first international competition came at the 2015 World Youth Championships in Athletics, where the 100 m was seen as a duel between her and America's Candace Hill (who had recently broken the World youth best). St. Fort produced three personal bests at the competition, running 11.39, 11.24, then 11.19 seconds in the final to secure the silver medal behind Hill. A 100 m gold followed at the 2015 Pan American Junior Athletics Championships in the absence of Hill. Her last major outing of the year was a senior debut at the 2015 World Championships in Athletics. She was chosen as the relay alternate and competed in the heats of the 4×100 metres relay, where she broke the Trinidad and Tobago national record with a time of 42.24 seconds, anchoring a team of Kelly-Ann Baptiste, Michelle-Lee Ahye and Reyare Thomas. In the final, she was replaced by Semoy Hackett and the team improved the record further in their bronze medal-winning run. The 17-year-old St. Fort received a bronze medal as the heats runner.

== Personal best ==
Event	Result	Venue	Date
Outdoor
100 metres	11.06 sec	(Trinidad and Tobago) Port of Spain	24 June 2017
200 metres	23.55 sec	(United States) Miramar	24 April 2014

== International competitions ==
Year	Competition	Venue	Position	Event	Notes
2015	World Youth Championships	Cali, Colombia	2nd	100 m	11.19
2015	Pan American Junior Championships	Edmonton, Canada	1st	100 m	11.31
2015	World Championships	Beijing, China	3rd (h)	4 × 100 m relay	42.24 NR^{1}
2016	World U20 Championships	Bydgoszcz, Poland	3rd	100 m	11.18
2016	Olympic Games	Rio de Janeiro, Brazil	5th	4 × 100 m relay	42.12
2017	World Relays	Nassau, Bahamas	—	4 × 100 m relay	DNF
2017	Pan American U20 Championships	Trujillo, Peru	1st	100 m	11.32
2017	World Championships	London, United Kingdom	31st (h)	100 m	11.44
2017	World Championships	London, United Kingdom	6th	4 × 100 m relay	42.62
2018	Commonwealth Games	Gold Coast, Australia	6th	100 m	11.37
2018	Commonwealth Games	Gold Coast, Australia	4th	4 × 100 m relay	43.50
2018	Central American and Caribbean Games	Barranquilla, Colombia	2nd	100 m	11.15
2018	Central American and Caribbean Games	Barranquilla, Colombia	2nd	4 × 100 m relay	43.61
2018	NACAC Championships	Toronto, Canada	6th	100 m	11.28
2021	Olympic Games	Tokyo, Japan	15th (h)	4 × 100 m relay	43.62
2022	NACAC Championships	Freeport, Bahamas	10th (h)	100 m	11.60
2022	NACAC Championships	Freeport, Bahamas	4th	4 × 100 m relay	43.81

^{1}Was not selected to run in the final where her team won the bronze
