= 2013 World Youth Championships in Athletics – Girls' 100 metres hurdles =

Girls' 100 metres hurdles at the 2013 World Youth Championships in Athletics
- Venue: RSC Olimpiyskiy
- Dates: 10 July (heats); 11 July (semifinal & final)
- Competitors: 46
- Winning time: 12.94 WYB

Medalists
gold medal	Yanique Thompson	Jamaica
silver medal	Dior Hall	United States
bronze medal	Mikiah Brisco	United States

The girls' 100 metres hurdles at the 2013 World Youth Championships in Athletics was held from 10 to 11 July.

== Medalists ==
Gold	Silver	Bronze
Yanique Thompson; Jamaica	Dior Hall; United States	Mikiah Brisco; United States

== Records ==
Prior to the competition, the following records were as follows.

World Youth Best	Adrianna Lamalle (FRA)	13.08	Bydgoszcz, Poland	18 July 1999
Championship Record	Adrianna Lamalle (FRA)	13.08	Bydgoszcz, Poland	18 July 1999
World Youth Leading	Yanique Thompson (JAM)	13.23	Kingston, Jamaica	16 June 2013

== Heats ==
Qualification rule: first 3 of each heat (Q) plus the 6 fastest times (q) qualified.

=== Heat 1 ===
Rank	Lane	Name	Nationality	Time	Notes
1	7	Dior Hall	United States	13.39	Q, PB
2	8	Jessi Landström	Finland	13.97	Q
3	5	Nana Fujimori	Japan	14.04	Q, SB
4	3	Mari Anderssen	Norway	14.16	q
5	6	Alba Villaronga	Spain	14.27	
6	1	Barbora Dvoráková	Czech Republic	14.36	
7	2	Zhang Xueqing	China	14.54	
8	4	Alexa Morey	Peru	15.05	PB

=== Heat 2 ===
Rank	Lane	Name	Nationality	Time	Notes
1	5	Rushelle Burton	Jamaica	13.78	Q
2	7	Luca Kozák	Hungary	13.91	Q
3	3	Marta Azores	Spain	14.43	Q
4	6	Veronika Šádková	Czech Republic	14.45	
5	2	Yuliya Ionycheva	Ukraine	14.54	
6	4	Jannah Wong Min	Singapore	15.10	
7	8	Tia Thevenin	Canada	15.47	

=== Heat 3 ===
Rank	Lane	Name	Nationality	Time	Notes
1	1	Chantal Butzek	Germany	13.88	Q
2	4	Adriana Janic	Sweden	13.93	Q
3	7	Meg Hemphill	Japan	14.10	Q, SB
4	3	Iuliia Sokolova	Russia	14.18	q
5	5	Jeminise Parris	Trinidad and Tobago	14.19	q
6	8	Andrea Vargas	Costa Rica	14.34	SB
7	2	Agata Borowiak	Poland	14.43	
8	6	Stanislava Lajcáková	Slovakia	14.80	

=== Heat 4 ===
Rank	Lane	Name	Nationality	Time	Notes
1	3	Petra Répási	Hungary	13.93	Q
2	4	Moesha Howard	Great Britain	14.11	Q
3	2	Emma Koistinen	Finland	14.22	Q
4	5	Chen Jing	China	14.39	
5	8	Camilla Papa	Italy	14.61	
6	7	Hasibe Fil	Turkey	14.84	
7	1	Badia Camara	Qatar	15.67	PB
	6	Inara Cortez	Ecuador	DNF	

=== Heat 5 ===
Rank	Lane	Name	Nationality	Time	Notes
1	2	Yanique Thompson	Jamaica	13.52	Q
2	6	Mikiah Brisco	United States	13.73	Q, PB
3	8	Lina Amr Gaber	Egypt	14.02	Q
4	7	Shirin Irving	Great Britain	14.17	q
5	4	Vlatka Sekernik	Croatia	14.21	q
6	3	Steffi Murillo	Peru	14.24	q, PB
	5	Maroua Salmi	Algeria	DQ	

=== Heat 6 ===
Rank	Lane	Name	Nationality	Time	Notes
1	6	Siliane Van Cauwemberghe	Belgium	14.12	Q
2	7	Stephanie Amador	Cuba	14.16	Q
3	5	Léa Fleury	France	14.22	Q
4	8	Juliana Puopolo	Canada	14.39	
5	2	Amina Zitouni	Algeria	14.58	
6	3	Rachel Malamo	Italy	14.63	
7	1	Roxana Ospanova	Kazakhstan	14.71	
8	4	Anastasiya Sukhotska	Ukraine	14.92	PB

== Semifinals ==
Qualification rule: first 2 of each heat (Q) plus the 2 fastest times (q) qualified.

=== Heat 1 ===
Rank	Lane	Name	Nationality	Time	Notes
1	4	Rushelle Burton	Jamaica	13.37	Q, PB
2	6	Adriana Janic	Sweden	13.44	Q, PB
3	5	Chantal Butzek	Germany	13.62	q, PB
4	3	Jessi Landström	Finland	13.66	PB
5	1	Shirin Irving	Great Britain	13.71	PB
6	2	Jeminise Parris	Trinidad and Tobago	13.89	PB
7	8	Meg Hemphill	Japan	13.98	SB
8	7	Léa Fleury	France	14.02	

=== Heat 2 ===
Rank	Lane	Name	Nationality	Time	Notes
1	3	Dior Hall	United States	13.16	Q, WYL
2	6	Luca Kozák	Hungary	13.61	Q, PB
3	5	Stephanie Amador	Cuba	13.66	
4	4	Siliane Van Cauwemberghe	Belgium	13.86	
5	8	Lina Amr Gaber	Egypt	13.91	PB
6	1	Mari Anderssen	Norway	14.08	
7	7	Marta Azores	Spain	14.13	
8	2	Steffi Murillo	Peru	14.18	PB

=== Heat 3 ===
Rank	Lane	Name	Nationality	Time	Notes
1	4	Yanique Thompson	Jamaica	13.10	Q, WYL
2	5	Mikiah Brisco	United States	13.47	Q, PB
3	1	Iuliia Sokolova	Russia	13.48	q, PB
4	3	Moesha Howard	Great Britain	13.66	PB
5	8	Nana Fujimori	Japan	13.75	SB
6	2	Vlatka Sekernik	Croatia	13.85	PB
	6	Petra Répási	Hungary	DNF	
	7	Emma Koistinen	Finland	DNS	

== Final ==
Rank	Lane	Name	Nationality	Time	Notes
1st place, gold medalist(s)	4	Yanique Thompson	Jamaica	12.94	WYB
2nd place, silver medalist(s)	3	Dior Hall	United States	13.01	PB
3rd place, bronze medalist(s)	8	Mikiah Brisco	United States	13.29	PB
4	5	Rushelle Burton	Jamaica	13.32	PB
5	6	Adriana Janic	Sweden	13.33	PB
6	2	Chantal Butzek	Germany	13.40	PB
7	7	Luca Kozák	Hungary	13.62	
8	1	Iuliia Sokolova	Russia	13.72	
