= Dior Hall =

American hurdler (born 1996)

Personal information
- Nationality: American
- Born: January 2, 1996 (age 30) Denver, Colorado

Sport
- Sport: Track and Field
- Event: 100 metre hurdles
- College team: University of Southern California

Achievements and titles
- Personal best(s): 100m h: 13.18 (Albuquerque 2011) 100m h: 12.92 (Hayward Field, Eugene, OR 2014)
Medal record
Women's athletics
Representing the United States
World Youth Championships
Gold medal – first place	2013 Donetsk	Medley relay
Silver medal – second place	2013 Donetsk	100 m hurdles
World Junior Championships
Silver medal – second place	2014 Eugene	100 m hurdles

Dior Hall (born January 2, 1996) is an American hurdler who specializes in the 100 metre hurdles.

A native of Denver, Colorado, as a high schooler, Hall attended Denver School of Science and Technology, but ran at George Washington High School because DSST does not field a track team. She established an indoor 60 metre World Youth Best at the CSM Twilight Collegiate Open in Golden, Colorado.

Hall competed in the 100 metres hurdles at the 2012 World Junior Championships in Athletics. In the final, she was reportedly leading when she hit a hurdle and fell over the final hurdle, suffering a disqualification.

Hall was the silver medalist at 2013 World Youth Championships in Athletics.

Hall is one of the American medal hopes for the 2014 World Junior Championships in Athletics. On 27 July, Hall earned the silver medal at the 2014 IAAF World Junior Championships. Hall's time of 12.92 seconds in the 100 meters hurdles broke the 35-year-old US High School record of 12.95 held by Candy Young of Pennsylvania. Hall's finish behind University of Georgia freshmen, Kendell Williams, completed a one-two sweep of the medals for the US.

== University of Southern California ==
Hall became a freshman at the University of Southern California for the 2014–15 season. As the only freshman to make the finals at the NCAA Championships, she set a new World Junior Record of 12.74 (+1.7) while taking third place. Later in the season she became the 2015 U.S. Junior Champion.
