= 2013 World Youth Championships in Athletics – Girls' medley relay =

Girls' medley relay at the 2013 World Youth Championships in Athletics
- Venue: RSC Olimpiyskiy
- Dates: 13 July (heats); 14 July (final)
- Nations: 22
- Winning time: 2:05.15 WYL

Medalists
gold medal	Dior Hall; Ky Westbrook; Raevyn Rogers; Olivia Baker; Chyna Ries	United States
silver medal	Taylor Hill; Nelda Huggins; Jonel Lacey; Tarika Moses; Lakeisha Warner	British Virgin Islands
bronze medal	Mizuki Nakamura; Nana Fujimori; Seika Aoyama; Nanako Matsumoto	Japan

The girls' medley relay at the 2013 World Youth Championships in Athletics was held on 13 and 14 July.

== Medalists ==
Gold	Silver	Bronze
United States; Dior Hall; Ky Westbrook; Raevyn Rogers; Olivia Baker; Chyna Ries	British Virgin Islands; Taylor Hill; Nelda Huggins; Jonel Lacey; Tarika Moses; Lakeisha Warner	Japan; Mizuki Nakamura; Nana Fujimori; Seika Aoyama; Nanako Matsumoto

== Records ==
Prior to the competition, the following records were as follows.

World Youth Best	Jamaica	2:03.42	Lille, France	10 July 2011
Championship Record	Jamaica	2:03.42	Lille, France	10 July 2011
World Youth Leading	Nigeria	2:09.36	Warri, Nigeria	31 March 2013

== Heats ==
Qualification rule: first 2 of each heat (Q) and the 2 fastest times (q) qualified.

=== Heat 1 ===
Rank	Lane	Nation	Athletes	Time	Note
1	5	Canada	Natasha Brown, Raquel Tjernagel, Mariam Abdul-Rashid, Kendra Clarke	2:08.52	Q, WYL
2	7	British Virgin Islands	Taylor Hill, Nelda Huggins, Tarika Moses, Lakeisha Warner	2:08.80	Q, PB
3	3	Czech Republic	Andrejka Školová, Veronika Paličková, Jana Reissová, Zdeňka Seidlová	2:09.12	q, PB
4	1	Brazil	Mirna da Silva, Vitória Cristina Rosa, Letícia de Souza, Tábata de Carvalho	2:11.20	SB
5	2	New Zealand	Abby Goldie, Zoe Hobbs, Megan Kikuchi, Shannon Gearey	2:13.00	SB
6	8	Botswana	Gosego Mpeo, Joy Mphatho, Gorata Thebe, Galefele Moroko	2:13.85	
7	6	Romania	Lorena Almășan, Livia Cristurean, Andreea Timofei, Elena Strutinschi	2:16.71	SB
8	4	Algeria	Sarah Nazef, Loubna Ben Si Ali, Zouaouia Berrehil, Sabrina Hocine	2:16.84	

=== Heat 2 ===
Rank	Lane	Nation	Athletes	Time	Note
1	8	Japan	Mizuki Nakamura, Nana Fujimori, Seika Aoyama, Nanako Matsumoto	2:08.39	Q, WYL
2	6	Italy	Annalisa Spadotto Scott, Denise Rega, Alice Mangione, Elena Bellò	2:11.25	Q, SB
3	7	Ukraine	Alina Kalistratova, Oleksandra Romanyuk, Yana Kachur, Yuliya Moroz	2:14.54	
	5	Jamaica	Yanique Thompson, Shanice Reid, Tiffany James, Yanique McNeil	DQ	
	4	Nigeria	Tobi Amusan, Deborah Adewunmi Adewale, Edidiong Odiong, Abimbola Junaid	DQ	
	3	Croatia		DNS	
	2	South Africa		DNS	

=== Heat 3 ===
Rank	Lane	Nation	Athletes	Time	Note
1	8	United States	Chyna Ries, Ky Westbrook, Olivia Baker, Raevyn Rogers	2:07.13	Q, WYL
2	7	China	Ge Manqi, Wang Xuan, Liang Xiaojing, Huang Guifen	2:09.90	Q, PB
3	2	Hungary	Luca Kozák, Melinda Ferenczi, Mónika Zsiga, Luca Palásti	2:10.85	q
4	8	Slovakia	Zuzana Karaffová, Martina Sameková, Daniela Ledecká, Viktória Zahradníčková	2:13.47	PB
5	6	Bahamas	Makeya White, Jenae Ambrose, Mesha Newbold, Kadeisha Hield	2:13.63	SB
6	3	Slovenia	Tjaša Sirc, Eva Pivk, Julija Praprotnik, Maja Pogorevc	2:14.09	SB
7	4	Ecuador	Jenifer Canchingre, Inara Cortez, María Cobo, Virginia Villalba	2:16.11	

== Final ==
Rank	Lane	Nation	Athletes	Time	Note
1st place, gold medalist(s)	5	United States	Dior Hall, Ky Westbrook, Raevyn Rogers, Olivia Baker	2:05.15	WYL
2nd place, silver medalist(s)	3	British Virgin Islands	Taylor Hill, Nelda Huggins, Jonel Lacey, Tarika Moses	2:07.40	PB
3rd place, bronze medalist(s)	4	Japan	Mizuki Nakamura, Nana Fujimori, Seika Aoyama, Nanako Matsumoto	2:07.61	PB
4	1	Czech Republic	Andrejka Školová, Veronika Paličková, Jana Reissová, Zdeňka Seidlová	2:08.55	PB
5	6	Canada	Natasha Brown, Raquel Tjernagel, Mariam Abdul-Rashid, Kendra Clarke	2:08.59	
6	2	Hungary	Luca Kozák, Melinda Ferenczi, Mónika Zsiga, Luca Palásti	2:09.32	SB
7	7	Italy	Annalisa Spadotto Scott, Micaela Moroni, Anna Schena, Elena Bellò	2:10.64	SB
	8	China	Ge Manqi, Wang Xuan, Liang Xiaojing, Huang Guifen	DQ	
