= Liliana Neto =

Angolan sprinter

Personal information
- Born: 29 January 1997 (age 28) Luanda, Angola
- Height: 1.66 m (5 ft 5 in)

Sport
- Sport: Track and field
- Event: 100 metres

Liliana Estefânia Salvador Neto (born 29 January 1997) is an Angolan sprinter. She competed in the women's 100 metres event at the 2016 Summer Olympics.

== Career ==
Neto was 7th at the 2014 Portuguese U18 Athletics Championships 100 metres, running a wind-aided 12.46 second time. At the 2014 European Champion Clubs Cup for Juniors "B" group, Neto finished 7th in the 100 metres finals, running 13.54 seconds. She was runner-up at the 2015 Portuguese Athletics Indoor Club Championships in the 60 metres in 8.17 seconds.

In July 2016, Neto qualified for the 100 metres at the 2016 World Athletics U20 Championships in Bydgoszcz, Poland. She was 7th in the 2nd heat, running 13.46 seconds and not advancing. Her time was a wind-legal personal best.

Neto did not have high expectations going into the 2016 Olympics. She was seeded in the first lane of the first preliminary round heat. She finished 7th, running 13.58 seconds. She didn't advance to the quarter-finals. However, she beat competitiors from American Samoa, Afghanistan, Saudi Arabia, and Kiribati.

Neto said she would begin preparing for the 2020 Summer Olympics after the 2016 Games. The head of the Angolan Olympic delegation Mário Rosa's choice to send Neto was guided by the need for experience and a desire to qualify for the 2020 Games.

== Personal life ==
Neto was born in Luanda. Her daily life mainly consisted of training, studying, and staying at home. She represented the S.L. Benfica club in athletics competitions in Portugal.
