= Chantal Butzek =

German sprinter and hurdler

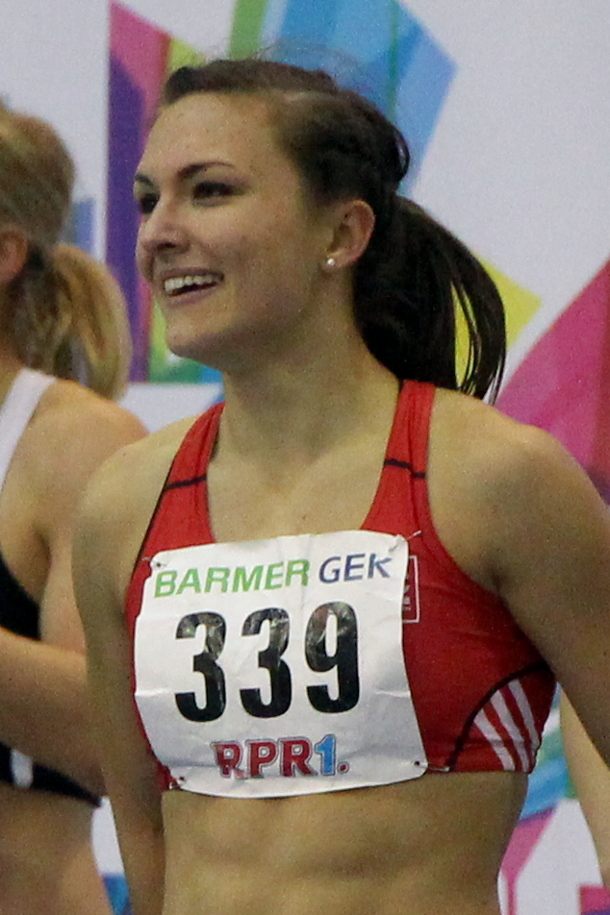

Personal information
- Born: 25 February 1997 (age 28) Paderborn, Germany
- Height: 173 cm (5 ft 8 in)

Sport
- Country: Germany
- Sport: Athletics
- Event(s): 100 m, 100 m hurdles
- Club: LC Paderborn
- Coached by: Thomas Prange

Chantal Butzek (born 25 February 1997 in Paderborn) is a German athlete competing in sprinting and hurdling events. She represented her country at the 2016 World Indoor Championships with reaching the semifinals.

== Competition record ==
Year	Competition	Venue	Position	Event	Notes
Representing Germany
2013	World Youth Championships	Donetsk, Ukraine	6th	100 m hurdles (76.2 cm)	13.40
2014	World Junior Championships	Eugene, United States	3rd	4 × 100 m relay	44.65
2015	European Junior Championships	Eskilstuna, Sweden	3rd (sf)	100 m	11.63^{1}
2016	World Indoor Championships	Portland, United States	22nd (sf)	60 m	7.45
2016	World U20 Championships	Bydgoszcz, Poland	18th (sf)	100 m	11.74
2016	World U20 Championships	Bydgoszcz, Poland	3rd	4 × 100 m relay	44.18
2017	European U23 Championships	Bydgoszcz, Poland	–	4 × 100 m relay	DNF

^{1}Did not start in the final

== Personal bests ==
Outdoor

- 100 metres – 11.61 (+0.6 m/s, Eskilstuna 2015)

Indoor

- 60 metres – 7.27 (Dortmund 2016)
- 60 metres hurdles – 8.42 (Sindelfingen 2014)
