= Athletics at the 2016 Summer Olympics – Women's 100 metres =

Women's 100 metres at the Games of the XXXI Olympiad
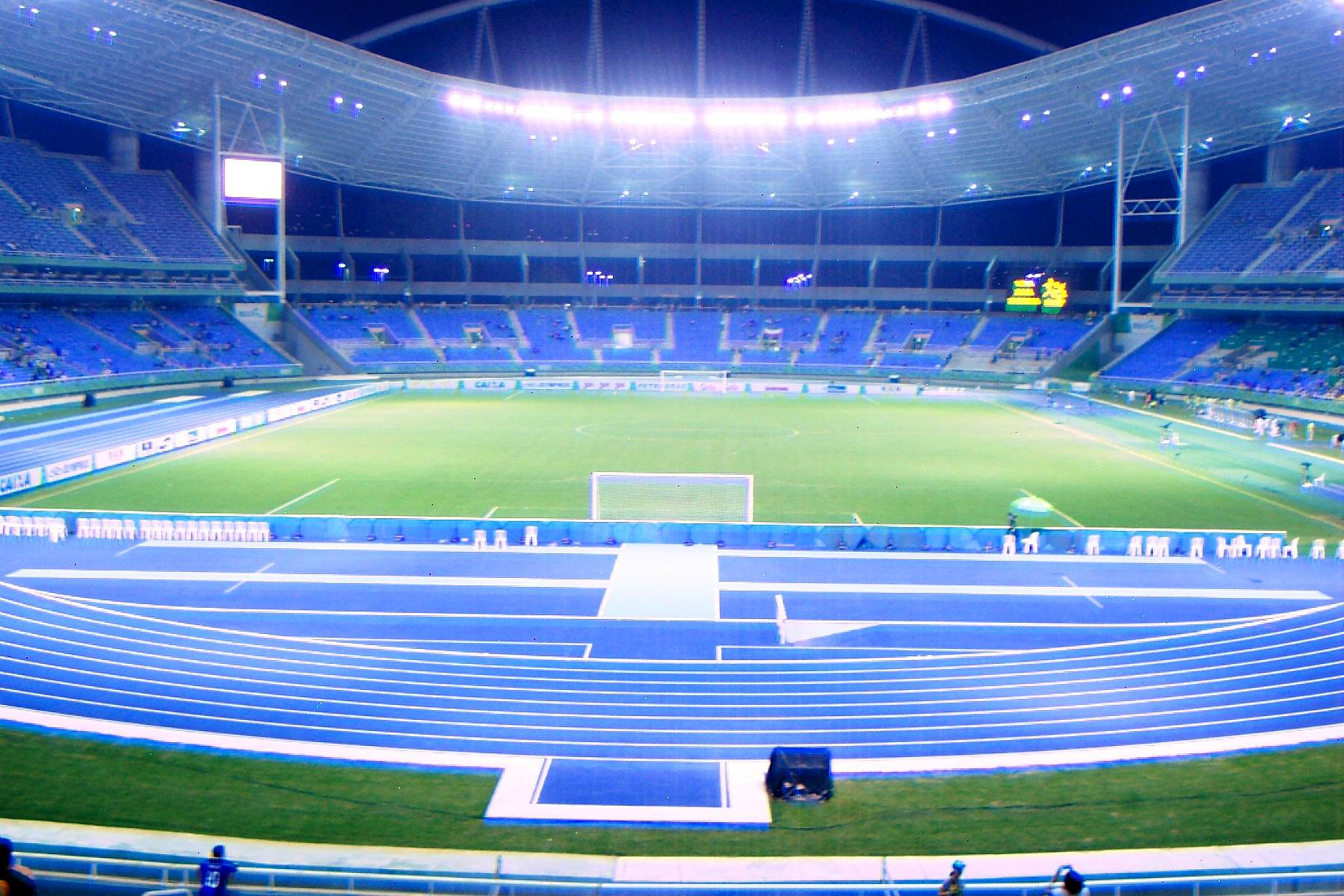
- Interior view of the Estádio Olímpico João Havelange, where the Women's 100m took place.
- Venue: Olympic Stadium
- Dates: 12 August 2016 (Preliminary round & heats); 13 August 2016 (semi-final & final)
- Competitors: 80 from 56 nations
- Winning time: 10.71

Medalists
| 1st place, gold medalist(s) | | Elaine Thompson | Jamaica |
| 2nd place, silver medalist(s) | | Tori Bowie | United States |
| 3rd place, bronze medalist(s) | | Shelly-Ann Fraser-Pryce | Jamaica |

Official Video Highlights

The women's 100 metres event at the 2016 Summer Olympics took place between 12 and 13 August at the Olympic Stadium. The winning margin was 0.12 seconds. The winner, Elaine Thompson from Jamaica, had the second slowest reaction time in the final.

== Summary ==
Shelly-Ann Fraser-Pryce was the defending Olympic champion from 2012 and entered the competition having won five of the last six global championships. At eighth in the year's rankings, she was not in peak form resulting from her toe injury. Elaine Thompson had beaten her at the Jamaican Championships with a world-leading and national record-equalling 10.70 seconds. American champion English Gardner was the next fastest and the two other American entrants, Tianna Bartoletta and Tori Bowie, shared third on the world rankings with African record breaker Murielle Ahouré at 10.78 seconds. Dutchwoman Dafne Schippers was also a strong entrant.

Charlotte Wingfield of Malta was comfortably the fastest qualifier in the preliminaries at 11.86 seconds. Cecilia Bouele of Congo was the only other athlete under 12 seconds in that round. In the first round proper Fraser-Pryce demonstrated her form with 10.96 seconds to top qualifying. Trinidad and Tobago's Michelle-Lee Ahye was the next fastest heat winner in eleven seconds dead, while all the top runners progressed. The semi-final round excised Murielle Ahouré and Tianna Bartoletta. Earlier in the season, both had run 10.78 and are tied for the fourteenth-fastest in history. Fraser-Pryce and Thompson were the fastest in 10.88 but only eight hundredths separated the finalists.

In the final, Tori Bowie reacted the fastest, but Elaine Thompson got the best start. Shelly-Ann Fraser-Pryce has previously gained the edge from her exceptional start, but at best she was even with Thompson, which Thompson expanded upon for the win. For her fast reaction, Bowie was a step behind in the early stages of the race but made a late rush to catch Fraser-Pryce just before the line for silver. After an injured toe during most of the season, it was Fraser-Pryce's season best for bronze. Thompson's time 10.71 would have been good enough to be the fifth time in history, had she not already run 10.70 at the Jamaican Olympic Trials earlier in the season to tie Fraser-Pryce for fourth.

The medals were presented by Nawal El Moutawakel, IOC member, Morocco and Frankie Fredericks, Council Member of the IAAF.

== Records ==
Prior to this competition, the existing world and Olympic records were as follows.

| World record | Florence Griffith Joyner (USA) | 10.49 | Indianapolis, United States | 16 July 1988 |
| Olympic record | Florence Griffith Joyner (USA) | 10.62 | Seoul, Korea | 24 September 1988 |
| 2016 World leading | Elaine Thompson (JAM) | 10.70 | Kingston, Jamaica | 1 July 2016 |

| Area | Time (s) | Wind | Athlete | Nation |
|---|---|---|---|---|
| Africa (records) | 10.78 | +1.6 | Murielle Ahouré | Ivory Coast |
| Asia (records) | 10.79 | +0.0 | Li Xuemei | China |
| Europe (records) | 10.73 | +2.0 | Christine Arron | France |
| North, Central America and Caribbean (records) | 10.49 WR | +0.0 | Florence Griffith Joyner | United States |
| Oceania (records) | 11.11 | +1.9 | Melissa Breen | Australia |
| Oceania (records) | 11.11 | +0.0 | Denise Robertson | Australia |
| South America (records) | 10.99 | +0.9 | Angela Tenorio | Ecuador |

The following national records were established during the competition:

| Country | Athlete | Round | Time | Notes |
|---|---|---|---|---|
| Afghanistan | Kamia Yousufi (AFG) | Preliminaries | 14.02 s | |
| Cape Verde | Lidiane Lopes (CPV) | Preliminaries | 12.38 s | |
| Saudi Arabia | Kariman Abuljadayel (KSA) | Preliminaries | 14.61 s | |

== Schedule ==
All times are Brasília Time (UTC−3)

| Date | Time | Round |
|---|---|---|
| Friday, 12 August 2016 | 11:55; 22:40 | Preliminaries; Round 1 |
| Saturday, 13 August 2016 | 21:00; 22:37 | Semifinals; Final |

== Results ==
=== Preliminaries ===
The preliminary round of the competition featured athletes who had not achieved the required qualifying time for the event. Athletes who had achieved that time received a bye into the first round proper.

Qualification rule: first 2 of each heat (Q) plus the 2 fastest times (q) qualified.

==== Preliminary Heat 1 ====
| Rank | Lane | Athlete | Nation | Reaction | Time | Notes |
|---|---|---|---|---|---|---|
| 1 | 5 | Hafsatu Kamara | Sierra Leone | 0.148 | 12.24 | Q |
| 2 | 7 | Sisila Seavula | Fiji | 0.143 | 12.34 | Q |
| 3 | 9 | Regine Tugade | Guam | 0.156 | 12.52 | |
| 4 | 8 | Makoura Keita | Guinea | 0.150 | 12.66 | PB |
| 5 | 3 | Shirin Akter | Bangladesh | 0.166 | 12.99 | |
| 6 | 4 | Mariana Cress | Marshall Islands | 0.206 | 13.20 | |
| 7 | 2 | Liliana Neto | Angola | 0.136 | 13.58 | |
| 8 | 6 | Kamia Yousufi | Afghanistan | 0.216 | 14.02 | NR |
| | | | | Wind: +0.9 m/s | | |

==== Preliminary Heat 2 ====
| Rank | Lane | Athlete | Nation | Reaction | Time | Notes |
|---|---|---|---|---|---|---|
| 1 | 9 | Sunayna Wahi | Suriname | 0.172 | 12.09 | Q |
| 2 | 7 | Patricia Taea | Cook Islands | 0.160 | 12.30 | Q |
| 3 | 8 | Mazoon Al-alawi | Oman | 0.161 | 12.30 | q |
| 4 | 2 | Lidiane Lopes | Cape Verde | 0.154 | 12.38 | NR |
| 5 | 3 | Phumlile Ndzinisa | Swaziland | 0.137 | 12.49 | |
| 6 | 5 | Taine Halasima | Tonga | 0.199 | 12.80 | |
| 7 | 6 | Laenly Phoutthavong | Laos | 0.186 | 12.82 | PB |
| 8 | 4 | Lerissa Henry | Federated States of Micronesia | 0.163 | 13.53 | |
| | | | | Wind: −0.2 m/s | | |

==== Preliminary Heat 3 ====
| Rank | Lane | Athlete | Nation | Reaction | Time | Notes |
|---|---|---|---|---|---|---|
| 1 | 3 | Charlotte Wingfield | Malta | 0.144 | 11.86 | Q |
| 2 | 4 | Cecilia Bouele | Republic of the Congo | 0.165 | 11.98 | Q |
| 3 | 9 | Zaidatul Husniah Zulkifli | Malaysia | 0.151 | 12.12 | q |
| 4 | 7 | Prenam Pesse | Togo | 0.189 | 12.38 | |
| 5 | 5 | Denika Kassim | Comoros | 0.192 | 12.53 | |
| 6 | 2 | Jordan Mageo | American Samoa | 0.173 | 13.72 | |
| 7 | 8 | Kariman Abuljadayel | Saudi Arabia | 0.205 | 14.61 | |
| 8 | 6 | Karitaake Tewaaki | Kiribati | 0.185 | 14.70 | |
| | | | | Wind: −0.2 m/s | | |

=== Heats ===
Qualification rule: first 2 of each heat (Q) plus the 8 fastest times (q) qualified.

==== Heat 1 ====
| Rank | Lane | Athlete | Nation | Reaction | Time | Notes |
|---|---|---|---|---|---|---|
| 1 | 8 | Desirèe Henry | Great Britain | 0.126 | 11.08 | Q |
| 2 | 6 | Murielle Ahouré | Ivory Coast | 0.159 | 11.17 | Q |
| 3 | 9 | Natalia Pohrebniak | Ukraine | 0.130 | 11.30 | q |
| 4 | 2 | Lorene Dorcas Bazolo | Portugal | 0.142 | 11.43 | |
| 5 | 3 | Wei Yongli | China | 0.154 | 11.48 | |
| 6 | 5 | Hajar Alkhaldi | Bahrain | 0.122 | 11.59 | |
| 7 | 7 | Rima Kashafutdinova | Kazakhstan | 0.174 | 11.84 | |
| 8 | 4 | Sisila Seavula | Fiji | 0.149 | 12.48 | |
| | | | | Wind: +0.3 m/s | | |

==== Heat 2 ====
| Rank | Lane | Athlete | Nation | Reaction | Time | Notes |
|---|---|---|---|---|---|---|
| 1 | 9 | Dafne Schippers | Netherlands | 0.143 | 11.16 | Q |
| 2 | 5 | Tatjana Pinto | Germany | 0.164 | 11.31 | Q |
| 3 | 6 | Khamica Bingham | Canada | 0.137 | 11.41 | |
| 4 | 7 | Flings Owusu-Agyapong | Ghana | 0.135 | 11.43 | |
| 5 | 4 | Gloria Asumnu | Nigeria | 0.139 | 11.55 | |
| 6 | 3 | Evelyn Rivera | Colombia | 0.161 | 11.59 | |
| 7 | 8 | Brenessa Thompson | Guyana | 0.162 | 11.72 | |
| 8 | 2 | Hafsatu Kamara | Sierra Leone | 0.150 | 12.22 | |
| | | | | Wind: 0.0 m/s | | |

==== Heat 3 ====
| Rank | Lane | Athlete | Nation | Reaction | Time | Notes |
|---|---|---|---|---|---|---|
| 1 | 9 | Tori Bowie | United States | 0.142 | 11.13 | Q |
| 2 | 5 | Blessing Okagbare | Nigeria | 0.154 | 11.16 | Q |
| 3 | 8 | Angela Tenorio | Ecuador | 0.150 | 11.35 | q |
| 4 | 4 | Ezinne Okparaebo | Norway | 0.141 | 11.43 | |
| 5 | 6 | Eliecith Palacios | Colombia | 0.172 | 11.48 | |
| 6 | 3 | Tahesia Harrigan-Scott | British Virgin Islands | 0.149 | 11.54 | |
| 7 | 7 | Khrystyna Stuy | Ukraine | 0.146 | 11.57 | |
| 8 | 2 | Cecilia Bouele | Republic of the Congo | 0.149 | 12.18 | |
| | | | | Wind: 0.0 m/s | | |

==== Heat 4 ====
| Rank | Lane | Athlete | Nation | Reaction | Time | Notes |
|---|---|---|---|---|---|---|
| 1 | 9 | Shelly-Ann Fraser-Pryce | Jamaica | 0.146 | 10.96 | Q |
| 2 | 5 | Marie-Josée Ta Lou | Ivory Coast | 0.156 | 11.01 | Q |
| 3 | 2 | Mujinga Kambundji | Switzerland | 0.149 | 11.19 | q |
| 4 | 8 | Narcisa Landazuri | Ecuador | 0.117 | 11.38 | q |
| 5 | 4 | Tynia Gaither | Bahamas | 0.154 | 11.56 | |
| 6 | 7 | Ramona Papaioannou | Cyprus | 0.140 | 11.61 | |
| 7 | 6 | Ruddy Zang Milama | Gabon | 0.151 | 11.67 | |
| 8 | 3 | Sunayna Wahi | Suriname | 0.117 | 12.25 | |
| | | | | Wind: −0.3 m/s | | |

==== Heat 5 ====
| Rank | Lane | Athlete | Nation | Reaction | Time | Notes |
|---|---|---|---|---|---|---|
| 1 | 9 | Tianna Bartoletta | United States | 0.148 | 11.23 | Q |
| 2 | 8 | Ewa Swoboda | Poland | 0.149 | 11.24 | Q |
| 3 | 6 | Olesya Povkh | Ukraine | 0.132 | 11.39 | q |
| 4 | 5 | Kelly-Ann Baptiste | Trinidad and Tobago | 0.141 | 11.42 | |
| 5 | 2 | Jennifer Madu | Nigeria | 0.163 | 11.61 | |
| 6 | 3 | Nigina Sharipova | Uzbekistan | 0.135 | 11.68 | |
| 7 | 4 | Dutee Chand | India | 0.151 | 11.69 | |
| 8 | 7 | Patricia Taea | Cook Islands | 0.159 | 12.41 | |
| | | | | Wind: −0.7 m/s | | |

==== Heat 6 ====
| Rank | Lane | Athlete | Nation | Reaction | Time | Notes |
|---|---|---|---|---|---|---|
| 1 | 5 | Michelle-Lee Ahye | Trinidad and Tobago | 0.153 | 11.00 | Q |
| 2 | 7 | Christania Williams | Jamaica | 0.170 | 11.27 | Q |
| 3 | 4 | Asha Philip | Great Britain | 0.120 | 11.34 | q |
| 4 | 2 | Crystal Emmanuel | Canada | 0.162 | 11.43 | |
| 5 | 6 | Viktoriya Zyabkina | Kazakhstan | 0.150 | 11.69 | |
| 6 | 8 | Marika Popowicz-Drapała | Poland | 0.136 | 11.70 | |
| 7 | 9 | Iman Essa Jasim | Bahrain | 0.161 | 11.72 | |
| 8 | 3 | Charlotte Wingfield | Malta | 0.138 | 11.90 | |
| | | | | Wind: ±0.0 m/s | | |

==== Heat 7 ====
| Rank | Lane | Athlete | Nation | Reaction | Time | Notes |
|---|---|---|---|---|---|---|
| 1 | 9 | Elaine Thompson | Jamaica | 0.174 | 11.21 | Q |
| 2 | 3 | Rosângela Santos | Brazil | 0.163 | 11.25 | Q |
| 3 | 4 | Semoy Hackett | Trinidad and Tobago | 0.138 | 11.35 | q |
| 4 | 8 | Toea Wisil | Papua New Guinea | 0.142 | 11.48 | |
| 5 | 2 | Olga Safronova | Kazakhstan | 0.148 | 11.50 | |
| 6 | 6 | Alyssa Conley | South Africa | 0.143 | 11.57 | |
| 7 | 5 | Melissa Breen | Australia | 0.143 | 11.74 | |
| 8 | 7 | Mazoon Al-Alawi | Oman | 0.199 | 12.43 | |
| | | | | Wind: −1.0 m/s | | |

==== Heat 8 ====
| Rank | Lane | Athlete | Nation | Reaction | Time | Notes |
|---|---|---|---|---|---|---|
| 1 | 6 | English Gardner | United States | 0.191 | 11.09 | Q |
| 2 | 4 | Carina Horn | South Africa | 0.158 | 11.32 | Q |
| 3 | 2 | Ivet Lalova-Collio | Bulgaria | 0.125 | 11.35 | q |
| 4 | 7 | Daryll Neita | Great Britain | 0.169 | 11.41 | |
| 5 | 3 | Rebekka Haase | Germany | 0.175 | 11.47 | |
| 6 | 9 | Yuan Qiqi | China | 0.143 | 11.56 | |
| 7 | 5 | Franciela Krasucki | Brazil | 0.159 | 11.67 | |
| 8 | 8 | Zaidatul Husniah Zulkifli | Malaysia | 0.149 | 12.62 | |
| | | | | Wind: −0.2 m/s | | |

=== Semifinals ===
==== Semifinal 1 ====
| Rank | Lane | Athlete | Nation | Reaction | Time | Notes |
|---|---|---|---|---|---|---|
| 1 | 7 | Tori Bowie | United States | 0.165 | 10.90 | Q |
| 2 | 6 | Michelle-Lee Ahye | Trinidad and Tobago | 0.134 | 10.90 | Q, SB |
| 3 | 9 | Christania Williams | Jamaica | 0.166 | 10.96 | q, PB |
| 4 | 5 | Murielle Ahouré | Ivory Coast | 0.156 | 11.01 | |
| 5 | 3 | Ángela Tenorio | Ecuador | 0.145 | 11.14 | |
| 6 | 8 | Mujinga Kambundji | Switzerland | 0.130 | 11.16 | |
| 7 | 4 | Ewa Swoboda | Poland | 0.155 | 11.18 | |
| 8 | 2 | Olesya Povkh | Ukraine | 0.126 | 11.29 | |
| | | | | Wind: +1.0 m/s | | |

==== Semifinal 2 ====
| Rank | Lane | Athlete | Nation | Reaction | Time | Notes |
|---|---|---|---|---|---|---|
| 1 | 5 | Shelly-Ann Fraser-Pryce | Jamaica | 0.151 | 10.88 | Q, SB |
| 2 | 4 | Dafne Schippers | Netherlands | 0.146 | 10.90 | Q |
| 3 | 6 | Marie-Josée Ta Lou | Ivory Coast | 0.157 | 10.94 | q, PB |
| 4 | 7 | Tianna Bartoletta | United States | 0.141 | 11.00 | |
| 5 | 9 | Rosângela Santos | Brazil | 0.133 | 11.23 | SB |
| 6 | 2 | Marizol Landázuri | Ecuador | 0.152 | 11.27 | |
| 7 | 8 | Nataliya Pohrebnyak | Ukraine | 0.138 | 11.32 | |
| 8 | 3 | Asha Philip | Great Britain | 0.124 | 11.33 | |
| | | | | Wind: +0.3 m/s | | |

==== Semifinal 3 ====
| Rank | Lane | Athlete | Nation | Reaction | Time | Notes |
|---|---|---|---|---|---|---|
| 1 | 4 | Elaine Thompson | Jamaica | 0.156 | 10.88 | Q |
| 2 | 7 | English Gardner | United States | 0.158 | 10.90 | Q |
| 3 | 6 | Blessing Okagbare | Nigeria | 0.155 | 11.09 | |
| 4 | 5 | Desirèe Henry | Great Britain | 0.129 | 11.09 | |
| 5 | 3 | Semoy Hackett | Trinidad and Tobago | 0.146 | 11.20 | |
| 6 | 9 | Carina Horn | South Africa | 0.149 | 11.20 | |
| 7 | 8 | Tatjana Pinto | Germany | 0.175 | 11.32 | |
| - | 2 | Ivet Lalova-Collio | Bulgaria | | DNS | |
| | | | | Wind: +0.6 m/s | | |

=== Final ===
| Rank | Lane | Athlete | Nation | Reaction | Time | Notes |
|---|---|---|---|---|---|---|
| 1st place, gold medalist(s) | 4 | Elaine Thompson | Jamaica | 0.157 | 10.71 | |
| 2nd place, silver medalist(s) | 5 | Tori Bowie | United States | 0.112 | 10.83 | |
| 3rd place, bronze medalist(s) | 6 | Shelly-Ann Fraser-Pryce | Jamaica | 0.138 | 10.86 | SB |
| 4 | 3 | Marie-Josée Ta Lou | Ivory Coast | 0.136 | 10.86 | PB |
| 5 | 9 | Dafne Schippers | Netherlands | 0.134 | 10.90 | |
| 6 | 8 | Michelle-Lee Ahye | Trinidad and Tobago | 0.132 | 10.92 | |
| 7 | 7 | English Gardner | United States | 0.148 | 10.94 | |
| 8 | 2 | Christania Williams | Jamaica | 0.163 | 11.80 | |
| | | | | Wind: +0.5 m/s | | |
