= Lerissa Henry =

Federated States of Micronesia sprinter

Personal information
- Born: August 18, 1997 (age 28)
- Education: Bailey Olter High School
- Height: 1.53 m (5 ft 0 in)
- Weight: 57 kg (126 lb)

Sport
- Country: Federated States of Micronesia
- Sport: Athletics
- Event: 100 metres

Lerissa Henry (born August 18, 1997) is a sprinter from the Federated States of Micronesia. She competed at the 2016 Summer Olympics in the women's 100 metres race; her time of 13.53 seconds in the preliminary round did not qualify her for the first round.
