= Denika Kassim =

Comorian sprinter

Denika Kassim (born August 8, 1997) is a Comorian sprinter. She competed at the 2016 Summer Olympics in the women's 100 metres race; her time of 12.53 seconds in the preliminary round did not qualify her for the first round.
