= Taina Halasima =

Tongan sprinter

Personal information
- Born: 11 December 1997 (age 27)

Sport
- Sport: Track and field
- Event: 100 metres

Taina Halasima (born 11 December 1997) is a Tongan sprinter. She competed in the women's 100 metres event at the 2016 Summer Olympics.
