= Kariman Abuljadayel =

Saudi Arabian sprinter (born 1994)

Personal information
- Born: 11 May 1994 (age 31) Riyadh, Saudi Arabia

Sport
- Sport: Track and field
- Event: 100 metres

Kariman Abuljadayel (born 11 May 1994) is a Saudi Arabian sprinter. She competed in the women's 100 metres event at the 2016 Summer Olympics. She was the first woman from Saudi Arabia to compete in the event. She finished seventh in the preliminary heat in 14.61 seconds setting the first women’s national record in the 100m for Saudi Arabia.
