= Candace Hill =

American athlete (born 1999)

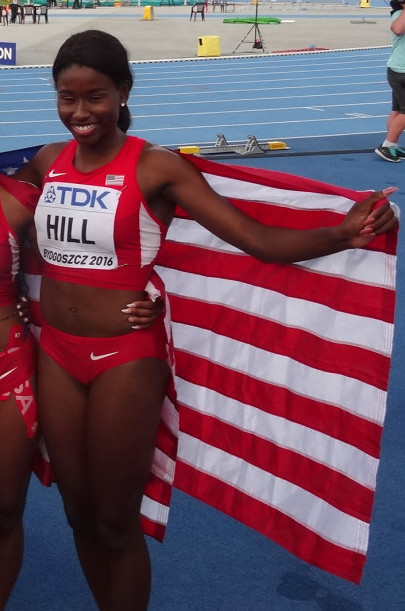
- Candace Hill at the 2016 IAAF World U20 Championships

Personal information
- Born: February 11, 1999 (age 27) Conyers, Georgia, United States
- Height: 5 ft 10 in (178 cm)
- Weight: 145 lb (66 kg)

Sport
- Sport: Track and field
- Event: Sprints
- Team: ASICS
- Turned pro: 2015
- Coached by: Dennis Shaver

Achievements and titles
- Personal bests: 100 m: 10.98 (Shoreline, 2015); 200 m: 22.43 (Cali, 2015)
Medal record
Women's athletics
Representing the United States
World U20 Championships
Gold medal – first place	2016 Bydgoszcz	100 m
Gold medal – first place	2016 Bydgoszcz	4x100 m relay
World Youth Championships
Gold medal – first place	2015 Cali	100 m
Gold medal – first place	2015 Cali	200 m

Candace Kathryn Hill (born February 11, 1999) is an American track and field athlete who competes in the 100 metres and 200 metres. She graduated from Rockdale County High School. She became the world's first high school woman to break the 11-second barrier clocking 10.98 in the 100 meters sprint at the 2015 Brooks PR Invitational on 21 June 2015 in Shoreline, Washington, United States. Her mark, quickly ratified, is the world youth best, the terminology for world record among athletes before the year of their 18th birthday. Since the mark was set outside of the sanctioned NFHS season, the mark is not eligible for the NFHS High School Record. Out of season marks like this are recognized by Track and Field News which has not yet published it as the National High School Record. Candace Hill is the first US high school female to run under 11.10 for 100 meters.

Four days later she was named the Gatorade National Girls' Track and Field Athlete of the Year. She is only the second sophomore to receive the award, after Marion Jones. She was also Track and Field News "High School Athlete of the Year" in 2015. On 1 July 2015, she won the Youth qualifying championship in Lisle, Illinois by a quarter of a second, which entitled her to run at the 2015 World Youth Championships in Athletics in Cali, Colombia, where she took the world title at 100 meters and set the championship meet record at 11.08 (+0.0 m/s). A couple of days later, she completed the sprint double by also winning the 200 meters with a personal best time of 22.43 (-0.7 m/s).

On December 17, 2015, Candace Hill turned professional with ASICS ten-year contract, skipping college athletics.

In 2016, Candace missed 4 months of training and won 2016 USA Junior Championships prelim in 200 meters in 22.76, won prelim and finals in 100 meters in 11.24. A week later, Candace Hill placed 14th in 23.05 in 200 meters at 2016 United States Olympic Trials (track and field) (22.93 in prelim). US sprint sensation Candace Hill's championship record of 11.07 (0.9 m/s) to take the women's 100m IAAF World U20 Championships title at 2016 IAAF World U20 Championships and ran anchor leg of 4×100 meters on a team who won gold in 43.69.

== Statistics ==
Information from World Athletics profile unless otherwise noted.

=== Personal bests ===
Event	Time (s)	Wind (m/s)	Competition	Venue	Date	Notes
100 meters	10.98	+2.0	Brooks PR Invitational	Shoreline, Washington	June 20, 2015	Age-16 world record, under-18 world best, under-20 world lead, under-20 American record
200 meters	22.43	−0.7	World Youth Championships	Cali, Colombia	July 19, 2015	Age-16 world record, under-18 world best, under-20 world lead, championship record
200 meters	22.38 w	+2.1	Star Athletics Sprint Series	Montverde, Florida, US	June 11, 2016	Wind-assisted
4 × 100 meters relay	43.69	n/a	World Under-20 Championships	Bydgoszcz, Poland	July 23, 2016	Under-20 world lead

=== Seasonal bests ===
Year	100 meters	200 meters
2013	11.81	23.85
2014	11.44	23.12
2015	10.98	22.43
2016	11.07	22.76
2017	11.23	22.68
2018	11.43	23.33
2019	11.25	23.07
2020	—	—
2021	10.99	22.30 w

=== International competitions ===
Representing the United States
Year	Competition	Venue	Position	Event	Time	Wind (m/s)	Notes
2015	World Youth Championships	Cali, Colombia	1st	100 m	11.08	0.0	CR
2015	World Youth Championships	Cali, Colombia	1st	200 m	22.43	−0.7	WU18B, WU20L, CR
2016	World U20 Championships	Bydgoszcz, Poland	1st	100 m	11.07	+0.9	WU20L, WU18L, CR
2016	World U20 Championships	Bydgoszcz, Poland	1st	4×100 m relay	43.69	—N/a	WU20L, PB

=== National competitions ===
Representing ASICS (2016–Present)
Year	Competition	Venue	Position	Event	Time	Wind (m/s)	Notes
2015	US World Youth Trials	Lisle, Illinois	1st	100 m	11.48	−0.8	
2015	US World Youth Trials	Lisle, Illinois	1st	200 m	23.14	+1.0	
2016	US Junior Championships	Clovis, California	1st	100 m	11.24	+1.2	
2016	US Junior Championships	Clovis, California	1st	200 m	22.76	+1.7	SB
2016	US Olympic Trials	Eugene, Oregon	13th	100 m	11.07 w	+3.1	Wind-assisted
2016	US Olympic Trials	Eugene, Oregon	14th	200 m	23.05	−1.7	
2017	US Indoor Championships	Albuquerque, New Mexico	3rd	300 m	36.56 A	—N/a	Altitude-assisted, PB
2017	US Junior Championships	Sacramento, California	1st	100 m	11.37	−1.5	
2017	US Championships	Sacramento, California	14th	200 m	23.34	−1.4	
2019	US Indoor Championships	Staten Island, New York	5th	60 m	7.43	—N/a	
2019	US Championships	Des Moines, Iowa	14th	100 m	11.53	−1.6	
2019	US Championships	Des Moines, Iowa	14th	200 m	24.28	−1.8	
2021	US Olympic Trials	Eugene, Oregon	8th	100 m	11.23	-1.0	
2022	US Championships	Eugene, Oregon	11th	200 m	22.50	+0.9	
2023	US Indoor Championships	Albuquerque, New Mexico	9th	60 m	7.35	—N/a	
2023	US Championships	Eugene, Oregon	24th	100 m	11.24	+0.1	
2023	US Championships	Eugene, Oregon	14th	200 m	23.04	−0.2	

== Awards ==
- World Athletics Awards

Rising Star (Women)：2015

Awards
Preceded by Myles Marshall	USA Track & Field Youth Athlete of the Year; 2015	Succeeded by Sydney McLaughlin
