= 2017 IAAF World Relays – Men's 4 × 400 metres relay =

Men's 4 × 400 metres relay at the 2017 IAAF World Relays
- Venue: Thomas Robinson Stadium
- Dates: 22 April (heats) & 23 April (final)
- Competitors: 76 from 17 nations
- Winning time: 3:02.13

Medalists
gold medal	David Verburg; Tony McQuay; Kyle Clemons; LaShawn Merritt; Najee Glass*	United States
silver medal	Isaac Makwala; Baboloki Thebe; Onkabetse Nkobolo; Karabo Sibanda	Botswana
bronze medal	Peter Matthews; Demish Gaye; Martin Manley; Steven Gayle; Javere Bell*; Javon Francis*	Jamaica

The men's 4 × 400 metres relay at the 2017 IAAF World Relays was held at the Thomas Robinson Stadium on 22–23 April.

In the final, American David Verburg took an immediate lead, opening up a gap on French, Brazilian and Cuban teams to his inside, and making up the three turn stagger on Botswana's Isaac Makwala (the #7 400 meter runner of all time) to his outside while still in the second turn. USA had a clear lead at the handoff with Tony McQuay breaking several metres ahead of Demish Gaye for Jamaica on the far outside. Down the backstretch Trinidad and Tobago's Jereem Richards, Botswana's Baboloki Thebe and Britain's Delano Williams lined up, breaking away from the other teams. Through the turn Thebe moved onto Richards' shoulder. Richards responded and moved up to Gaye, the three teams virtually even until Thebe fell back before the handoff. Trinidad gained position on the handoff to Jarrin Solomon, who found himself only two metres back of American Kyle Clemons. Down the backstretch, Jamaica's Martin Manley ran around Solomon and pulled to within a metre of Clemons coming off the final turn. As Manley tied up, Solomon came back to his shoulder with Botswana's Onkabetse Nkobolo making a big rush on the outside to make it a 3-way battle behind the Americans. At the handoff, American LaShawn Merritt started slowly and took a secure handoff. Meanwhile, Botswana's handoff to Karabo Sibanda was almost as efficient as a 4x100 handoff, Botswana gaining the advantage and moving right behind Merritt. Behind, Jamaica's Steven Gayle pushed down the backstretch, passing Sibanda and even, for a moment, Merritt on the inside. Merritt fought back and held off Gayle going into the final turn but Sibanda used that moment to sprint around the outside, gaining a microscopic lead on Merritt. Merritt successfully held Sibanda to the outside, making him run the extra distance through the turn. Coming off the turn, Merritt had gained a slight advantage but Sibanda was not done, making one more charge at Merritt down the final straightaway. Merritt held Sibanda off again, USA taking a 1-metre win.

== Records ==
Prior to the competition, the records were as follows:

World record	United States (Andrew Valmon, Quincy Watts, Harry Reynolds, Michael Johnson)	2:54.29	Stuttgart, Germany	22 August 1993
Championship record	United States (David Verburg, Tony McQuay, Christian Taylor, LaShawn Merritt	2:57.25	(The Bahamas) Nassau, Bahamas	25 May 2014
World Leading	Empire Athletics (Machel Cedenio Trinidad and Tobago, Tony McQuay United States, Kyle Clemons United States, Jehue Gordon Trinidad and Tobago	3:00.92	Gainesville, United States	1 April 2017
African Record	Nigeria (Clement Chukwu, Jude Monye, Sunday Bada, Enefiok Udo-Obong)	2:58.68	Sydney, Australia	30 September 2000
Asian Record	Japan (Shunji Karube, Koji Ito, Jun Osakada, Shigekazu Omori)	3:00.76	Atlanta, United States	3 August 1996
North, Central American and Caribbean record	United States (Andrew Valmon, Quincy Watts, Harry Reynolds, Michael Johnson)	2:54.29	Stuttgart, Germany	22 August 1993
South American Record	Brazil (Eronilde de Araújo, Cleverson da Silva, Claudinei da Silva, Sanderlei Parrela)	2:58.56	Winnipeg, Canada	30 July 1999
European Record	Great Britain (Iwan Thomas, Jamie Baulch, Mark Richardson, Roger Black)	2:56.60	Atlanta, United States	3 August 1996
Oceanian record	Australia (Bruce Frayne, Gary Minihan, Rick Mitchell, Darren Clark)	2:59.70	Los Angeles, United States	11 August 1984

== Schedule ==
Date	Time	Round
22 April 2017	21:12	Heats
23 April 2017	20:22	Final B
23 April 2017	21:55	Final

All times are local times (UTC-4)

== Results ==
KEY:	Q	Qualified	q	Fastest non-qualifiers	NR	National record	PB	Personal best	SB	Seasonal best	*WC	2017 World Championships qualification

=== Heats ===
Qualification: First 2 of each heat (Q) plus the 2 fastest times (q) advanced to the final. The next 8 fastest times qualified for the final B.

Rank	Heat	Nation	Athletes	Time	Notes
1	2	Trinidad and Tobago	Renny Quow, Jereem Richards, Deon Lendore, Lalonde Gordon	3:02.51	Q, SB
2	2	United States	Kyle Clemons, Najee Glass, Tony McQuay, David Verburg	3:02.62	Q
3	3	Botswana	Isaac Makwala, Karabo Sibanda, Onkabetse Nkobolo, Baboloki Thebe	3:03.09	Q, SB
4	3	Jamaica	Javere Bell, Javon Francis, Peter Matthews, Demish Gaye	3:03.52	Q, SB
5	1	France	Mamadou Kassé Hanne, Teddy Atine-Venel, Mamoudou-Elimane Hanne, Thomas Jordier	3:04.74	Q, SB
6	2	Cuba	Williams Collazo, Adrián Chacón, Osmaidel Pellicier, Yoandys Lescay	3:04.97	q, SB
7	3	Brazil	Anderson Henriques, Alexander Russo, Lucas Carvalho, Hugo de Sousa	3:05.05	q, SB
8	1	Great Britain	Matthew Hudson-Smith, Delano Williams, Jarryd Dunn, Theo Campbell	3:05.19	Q, SB
9	1	Bahamas	Michael Mathieu, Demetrius Pinder, Andretti Bain, Steven Gardiner	3:05.37	SB
10	1	Belgium	Dylan Borlée, Julien Watrin, Michaël Rossaert, Kévin Borlée	3:05.45	SB
11	3	Kenya	Collins Gichana, Boniface Mweresa, Geoffrey Kiprotich Rono, Alphas Kishoyian	3:05.93	SB
12	1	Czech Republic	Michal Desenský, Patrik Šorm, Jan Tesař, Vít Müller	3:07.58	SB
13	1	Germany	Alexander Gladitz, Alexander Juretzko, Johannes Trefz, Thomas Schneider	3:07.80	SB
14	1	Canada	Daniel Harper, Graeme Thompson, Benjamin Ayesu-Attah, Rayshaun Franklin	3:08.05	
15	2	Poland	Kacper Kozłowski, Łukasz Krawczuk, Przemysław Waściński, Rafał Omelko	3:08.42	
	2	Dominican Republic	Luis Charles, Gustavo Cuesta, Franklin Luis, Máximo Mercedes	DQ	R170.6(c)
	2	Japan	Julian Jrummi Walsh, Tomoya Tamura, Naoki Kobayashi, Kosuke Horii	DNF	
	3	Venezuela		DNS	

=== Final B ===
Rank	Lane	Nation	Athletes	Time	Notes
1	6	Kenya	Alphas Kishoyian, Collins Gichana, Geoffrey Kiprotich Rono, Boniface Mweresa	3:06.36	
2	5	Belgium	Dylan Borlée, Julien Watrin, Michaël Rossaert, Kévin Borlée	3:07.14	
3	2	Poland	Kacper Kozłowski, Łukasz Krawczuk, Bartłomiej Chojnowski, Rafał Omelko	3:07.89	
4	7	Czech Republic	Patrik Šorm, Vít Müller, Michal Desenský, Jan Tesař	3:08.17	
5	4	Bahamas	Andretti Bain, Demetrius Pinder, Elroy McBride, Andre Colebrook	3:08.29	
6	8	Germany	Alexander Juretzko, Johannes Trefz, Fabian Dammermann, Thomas Schneider	3:09.53	
7	3	Canada	Daniel Harper, Graeme Thompson, Rayshaun Franklin, Benjamin Ayesu-Attah	3:12.52	

=== Final ===
Rank	Lane	Nation	Athletes	Time	Notes	Points
1st place, gold medalist(s)	4	United States	David Verburg, Tony McQuay, Kyle Clemons, LaShawn Merritt	3:02.13	*WC	8
2nd place, silver medalist(s)	5	Botswana	Isaac Makwala, Baboloki Thebe, Onkabetse Nkobolo, Karabo Sibanda	3:02.28	*WC	7
3rd place, bronze medalist(s)	8	Jamaica	Peter Matthews, Demish Gaye, Martin Manley, Steven Gayle	3:02.84	*WC	6
4	6	Trinidad and Tobago	Renny Quow, Jereem Richards, Jarrin Solomon, Lalonde Gordon	3:03.17	*WC	5
5	1	Cuba	Williams Collazo, Adrián Chacón, Osmaidel Pellicier, Yoandys Lescay	3:03.60	*WC	4
6	7	Great Britain	Matthew Hudson-Smith, Delano Williams, Jarryd Dunn, Theo Campbell	3:03.84	*WC	3
7	2	Brazil	Anderson Henriques, Alexander Russo, Hugo de Sousa, Lucas Carvalho	3:05.96	*WC	2
8	3	France	Mamadou Kasse Hann, Teddy Atine-Venel, Mamoudou Eliman Hanne, Thomas Jordier	3:06.33	*WC	1
