= 2015 IAAF World Relays – Men's 4 × 400 metres relay =

Men's 4 × 400 metres relay at the 2015 IAAF World Relays
- Venue: Thomas Robinson Stadium
- Dates: 2 May (heats) & 3 May (final)
- Nations: 24
- Winning time: 2:58.43

Medalists
gold medal	David Verburg; Tony McQuay; Jeremy Wariner; LaShawn Merritt; United States
silver medal	Ramon Miller; Michael Mathieu; Steven Gardiner; Chris Brown; Bahamas
bronze medal	Dylan Borlée; Julien Watrin; Jonathan Borlée; Kevin Borlée; Belgium

The men's 4 × 400 metres relay at the 2015 IAAF World Relays was held at the Thomas Robinson Stadium on 2–3 May.

== Records ==
Prior to the competition, the records were as follows:

World record	United States (Andrew Valmon, Quincy Watts, Harry Reynolds, Michael Johnson)	2:54.29	Stuttgart, Germany	22 August 1993
Championship record	United States (David Verburg, Tony McQuay, Christian Taylor, LaShawn Merritt	2:57.25	(The Bahamas) Nassau, Bahamas	25 May 2014
World Leading	United States	3:00.86	Philadelphia, United States	25 April 2015
African Record	Nigeria (Clement Chukwu, Jude Monye, Sunday Bada, Enefiok Udo-Obong)	2:58.68	Sydney, Australia	30 September 2000
Asian Record	Japan (Shunji Karube, Koji Ito, Jun Osakada, Shigekazu Omori)	3:00.76	Atlanta, United States	3 August 1996
North, Central American and Caribbean record	United States (Andrew Valmon, Quincy Watts, Harry Reynolds, Michael Johnson)	2:54.29	Stuttgart, Germany	22 August 1993
South American Record	Brazil (Eronilde de Araújo, Cleverson da Silva, Claudinei da Silva, Sanderlei Parrela)	2:58.56	Winnipeg, Canada	30 July 1999
European Record	Great Britain (Iwan Thomas, Jamie Baulch, Mark Richardson, Roger Black)	2:56.60	Atlanta, United States	3 August 1996
Oceanian record	Australia (Bruce Frayne, Gary Minihan, Rick Mitchell, Darren Clark)	2:59.70	Los Angeles, United States	11 August 1984

== Schedule ==
Date	Time	Round
2 May 2015	19:00	Heats
3 May 2015	21:08	Final B
3 May 2015	22:01	Final

All times are local times (UTC-4)

== Results ==
KEY:	q	Fastest non-qualifiers	Q	Qualified	NR	National record	PB	Personal best	SB	Seasonal best

=== Heats ===
Qualification: First 2 of each heat (Q) plus the 2 fastest times (q) advanced to the final.

Rank	Heat	Lane	Nation	Athletes	Time	Notes
1	3	5	Trinidad and Tobago	Lalonde Gordon, Jarrin Solomon, Renny Quow, Machel Cedenio	3:02.09	Q, SB
2	1	4	Bahamas	Michael Mathieu, Demetrius Pinder, Alonzo Russell, Ramon Miller	3:02.18	Q
3	1	8	Brazil	Pedro Luiz de Oliveira, Wagner Cardoso, Hederson Estefani, Hugo de Sousa	3:02.23	Q, SB
4	3	1	Belgium	Dylan Borlée, Jonathan Borlée, Julien Watrin, Kevin Borlée	3:02.41	Q, SB
5	2	8	United States	David Verburg, Kyle Clemons, Jeremy Wariner, Brycen Spratling	3:02.81	Q
6	2	2	Jamaica	Javere Bell, Rusheen McDonald, Nathon Allen, Javon Francis	3:02.98	Q, SB
7	2	3	Botswana	Leaname Maotoanong, Zacharia Kamberuka, Onkabetse Nkobolo, Isaac Makwala	3:03.08	q, SB
8	3	2	Great Britain	Conrad Williams, Delano Williams, Jack Green, George Caddick	3:03.28	q, SB
9	1	2	Cuba	William Collazo, Raidel Acea, Adrian Chacón, Yoandys Lescay	3:03.50	SB
10	2	5	France	Mame-Ibra Anne, Teddy Atine-Venel, Thomas Jordier, Mamoudou Hanne	3:03.88	SB
11	1	1	Poland	Karol Zalewski, Michał Pietrzak, Łukasz Krawczuk, Rafał Omelko	3:05.13	
12	2	4	Kenya	Alexander Lerionka Sampao, Boniface Ontuga Mweresa, Michael Cheren Makan, Alphas Leken Kishoyian	3:05.92	
13	3	3	Venezuela	Omar Longart, Alberth Bravo, José Meléndez, Freddy Mezones	3:06.15	SB
13	1	7	Saudi Arabia	Mazen Al Yasen, Ali Al-Deraan, Mohammed Obaid Al-Salhi, Yousef Ahmed Masrahi	3:06.15	SB
15	1	3	Germany	Kamghe Gaba, Eric Krüger, Johannes Trefz, Thomas Schneider	3:06.20	
16	3	7	Australia	Alexander Beck, Craig Burns, Luke Stevens, Iain Douglas	3:06.37	
17	2	1	Japan	Naoki Kobayashi, Kentaro Sato, Julian Jrummi Walsh, Takamasa Kitagawa	3:06.38	SB
18	1	5	Colombia	Jhon Perlaza, Diego Palomeque, Carlos Lemos, Bernardo Baloyes	3:06.48	SB
19	2	6	Nigeria	Orukpe Eraiyokan, Robert Simmons, Cristian Morton, Miles Ukaoma	3:06.92	
20	3	6	Ireland	Craig Lynch, Thomas Barr, Brian Murphy, Richard Morrissey	3:07.11	SB
21	3	4	Canada	Philip Osei, Mike Robertson, Daniel Harper, Tremaine Harris	3:07.80	SB
22	1	6	Spain	Pau Fradera, Samuel García, Mark Ujakpor, Lucas Bua	3:08.49	SB
23	3	8	Dominican Republic	Luguelín Santos, Juander Santos, Yon Soriano, Winder Cuevas	3:12.55	
	2	7	Netherlands	Liemarvin Bonevacia, Bjorn Blauwhof, Obed Martis, Terrence Agard	DNF	

=== Final B ===
The final B was started at 21:16.

Rank	Lane	Nation	Athletes	Time	Notes
1	4	Poland	Kacper Kozłowski, Michał Pietrzak, Mateusz Fórmański, Rafał Omelko	3:03.23	
2	6	Cuba	William Collazo, Raidel Acea, Adrian Chacón, Yoandys Lescay	3:03.73	SB
3	1	Germany	Kamghe Gaba, Eric Krüger, Johannes Trefz, Thomas Schneider	3:04.90	SB
4	2	Australia	Craig Burns, Iain Douglas, Luke Stevens, Samuel Baird	3:05.13	SB
	5	France	Mame-Ibra Anne, Teddy Atine-Venel, Thomas Jordier, Mamoudou Hanne	DQ	162.7
	3	Kenya	Alexander Lerionka Sampao, Boniface Ontuga Mweresa, Joseph Poghishio Loshangar, Raymond Kibet	DQ	170.18
	7	Saudi Arabia		DNS	
	8	Venezuela		DNS	

=== Final ===
The final was started at 22:15.

Rank	Lane	Nation	Athletes	Time	Notes
1st place, gold medalist(s)	6	United States	David Verburg, Tony McQuay, Jeremy Wariner, LaShawn Merritt	2:58.43	WL
2nd place, silver medalist(s)	3	Bahamas	Ramon Miller, Michael Mathieu, Steven Gardiner, Chris Brown	2:58.91	SB
3rd place, bronze medalist(s)	8	Belgium	Dylan Borlée, Julien Watrin, Jonathan Borlée, Kevin Borlée	2:59.33	NR
4	7	Jamaica	Rusheen McDonald, Edino Steele, Ricardo Chambers, Javon Francis	3:00.23	SB
5	5	Brazil	Pedro Luiz de Oliveira, Wagner Cardoso, Hederson Estefani, Hugo de Sousa	3:00.96	SB
6	2	Great Britain	Conrad Williams, Rabah Yousif, Jack Green, George Caddick	3:01.51	SB
7	4	Trinidad and Tobago	Lalonde Gordon, Jarrin Solomon, Renny Quow, Machel Cedenio	3:03.10	
8	1	Botswana	Onkabetse Nkobolo, Zacharia Kamberuka, Leaname Maotoanong, Isaac Makwala	3:03.73	
