= Athletics at the 2015 Pan American Games – Men's 4 × 400 metres relay =

Men's 4 × 400 metres relay at the 2015 Pan American Games
- Venue: CIBC Pan Am and Parapan Am Athletics Stadium
- Dates: July 24 – July 25
- Competitors: 49 from 11 nations
- Winning time: 2:59.60

Medalists
Gold medal	Renny Quow; Jarrin Solomon; Emanuel Mayers; Machel Cedenio; Jehue Gordon	Trinidad and Tobago
Silver medal	William Collazo; Adrian Chacón; Osmaidel Pellicier; Yoandys Lescay	Cuba
Bronze medal	Kyle Clemons; James Harris; Marcus Chambers; Kerron Clement; Jeshua Anderson	United States

The men's 4 × 400 metres sprint competition of the athletics events at the 2015 Pan American Games will take place between the 24 and 25 of July at the CIBC Pan Am and Parapan Am Athletics Stadium. The defending Pan American Games champions are Noel Ruíz, Raidel Acea, Omar Cisneros, William Collazo, Júnior Díaz, Amaurys Valle and Amaurys Valle of Cuba.

Prior to the final, Cuba was disqualified for a registration violation (not naming their athletes before the deadline). Cuba ran in the final under protest and finished in second place. The disqualification was upheld and their result was removed. Later that was corrected and Cuba was reinstated as the silver medalists.

The final race started with the tall Venezuelan Alberth Bravo taking a commanding lead, making up the stagger on the diminutive Renny Quow from Trinidad and Tobago to his outside. Reality set in on the home stretch, Quow holding form on a more evenly paced race while Bravo tied up. TTO passed first while Bravo ended up passing last to a flat footed José Meléndez. Michael Mathieu sped through the turn to put Bahamas in the lead at the break. Jarrin Solomon and Adrian Chacón had TTO and Cuba fall in behind, putting a gap on USA leading the rest of the field. As they battled on the final straightaway, James Harris bridged the gap to make it a four team breakaway at the handoff. With Bahamas (Alonzo Russell) and Cuba (Osmaidel Pellicier) battling for the lead, Marcus Chambers fell off the back for USA on the backstretch while hurdler Emanuel Mayers for TTO tied up at the finish, allowing USA to hand off third well behind the leaders. Bahamas had a two-metre lead at the handoff, which Jeffery Gibson quickly extended to five through the turn. Another five metres back Machel Cedenio used his inside position to get the jump on American hurdler Kerron Clement. Down the backstretch and through the final turn, Cuba's Yoandys Lescay slowly whittled down Gibson's lead. By the head of the stretch it was down to a metre, with Cedenio and Clement 8 metres back. Coming off the turn Lescay moved into lane 2 and eased past Gibson, whose strides noticeably shortened. Behind them, Cedenio came off the turn wide into lane 2, with Clement looking to take advantage accelerating on his inside. Instead, Cedenio exploded into a different gear, sprinting while the rest of the runners were trying to maintain their stride. In 60 metres he made up the gap on Lescay, passing him 8 metres before the finish for the Trinidad and Tobago win. Clement followed Cedenio, passing the struggling Gibson for bronze but still four metres behind Lescay.

== Records ==
Prior to this competition, the existing world and Pan American Games records were as follows:

World record	United States	2.54.29	Stuttgart, Germany	August 22, 1993
Pan American Games record	Jamaica	2.57.97	Winnipeg, Canada	July 30, 1999

== Qualification ==
Each National Olympic Committee (NOC) ranked in the world's top 16 was able to enter one team.

== Schedule ==
Date	Time	Round
July 24, 2015	12:20	Semifinals
July 25, 2015	22:10	Final

== Results ==
All times shown are in seconds.

KEY:	q	Fastest non-qualifiers	Q	Qualified	NR	National record	PB	Personal best	SB	Seasonal best	DQ	Disqualified

=== Semifinals ===
Rank	Heat	Nation	Name	Time	Notes
1	2	Bahamas	LaToy Williams, Michael Mathieu, Andretti Bain, Alonzo Russell	3:01.00	Q
2	2	Cuba	William Collazo, Adrian Chacón, Osmaidel Pellicier, Yoandys Lescay	3:01.17	Q, SB
3	2	Trinidad and Tobago	Jehue Gordon, Renny Quow, Emanuel Mayers, Jarrin Solomon	3:01.58	Q, SB
4	2	Brazil	Pedro Luiz de Oliveira, Wagner Cardoso, Jonathan da Silva, Hederson Estefani	3:01.66	q
5	1	United States	James Harris, Jeshua Anderson, Marcus Chambers, Kyle Clemons	3:02.99	Q
6	1	Jamaica	Jonia McDonald, Riker Hylton, Javere Bell, Dane Hyatt	3:03.72	Q
7	1	Venezuela	Alberth Bravo, José Meléndez, Arturo Ramírez, Freddy Mezones	3:04.05	Q, SB
8	2	Costa Rica	Gary Robinson, Nery Brenes, Jarlex Lynch, Gerald Drummond	3:05.11	q, NR
9	1	Canada	Philip Osei, Daniel Harper, Brandon McBride, Nathan George	3:05.40	SB
10	1	Chile	Sergio Germain, Sergio Aldea, Martín Tagle, Alfredo Sepúlveda	3:09.89	SB
	1	Dominican Republic	Juander Santos, Yon Soriano, Joel Mejia, Gustavo Cuesta	DSQ	

=== Final ===
Rank t	Nation	Name	Time	Notes
1st place, gold medalist(s)	Trinidad and Tobago	Renny Quow, Jarrin Solomon, Emanuel Mayers, Machel Cedenio	2:59.60	SB
2nd place, silver medalist(s)	Cuba	William Collazo, Adrian Chacón, Osmaidel Pellicier, Yoandys Lescay	2:59.84	SB
3rd place, bronze medalist(s)	United States	Kyle Clemons, James Harris, Marcus Chambers, Kerron Clement	3:00.21	
4	Bahamas	LaToy Williams, Michael Mathieu, Alonzo Russell, Jeffery Gibson	3:00.34	
5	Brazil	Pedro Luiz de Oliveira, Wagner Cardoso, Hederson Estefani, Hugo de Sousa	3:01.18	
6	Jamaica	Jonia McDonald, Dane Hyatt, Javere Bell, Ricardo Chambers	3:01.97	
7	Venezuela	Alberth Bravo, José Meléndez, Arturo Ramírez, Freddy Mezones	3:03.47	SB
8	Costa Rica	Gary Robinson, Nery Brenes, Jarlex Lynch, Gerald Drummond	3:05.21	
