= Athletics at the 2015 Pan American Games – Men's 400 metres =

Men's 400 metres at the 2015 Pan American Games
- Venue: CIBC Pan Am and Parapan Am Athletics Stadium
- Dates: July 22 – July 23
- Competitors: 16 from 11 nations
- Winning time: 44.56

Medalists
Gold medal	Luguelín Santos	Dominican Republic
Silver medal	Machel Cedenio	Trinidad and Tobago
Bronze medal	Kyle Clemons	United States

The men's 400 metres sprint competition of the athletics events at the 2015 Pan American Games took place between the 22 and 23 of July at the CIBC Pan Am and Parapan Am Athletics Stadium in Toronto, Canada. The defending Pan American Games champion is Nery Brenes of Costa Rica.

== Records ==
Prior to this competition, the existing world and Pan American Games records were as follows:

World record	Michael Johnson (USA)	43.18	Seville, Spain	August 26, 1999
Pan American Games record	Roberto Hernández (CUB)	44.52	Havana, Cuba	1991

== Qualification ==
Each National Olympic Committee (NOC) was able to enter up to two entrants providing they had met the minimum standard (46.07) in the qualifying period (January 1, 2014 to June 28, 2015).

== Schedule ==
Date	Time	Round
July 22, 2015	11:00	Semifinals
July 23, 2015	19:20	Final

== Results ==
All times shown are in seconds.

KEY:	q	Fastest non-qualifiers	Q	Qualified	NR	National record	PB	Personal best	SB	Seasonal best	DQ	Disqualified

=== Semifinals ===
Rank	Heat	Name	Nationality	Time	Notes
1	1	Luguelín Santos	Dominican Republic	45.72	Q
2	1	Kyle Clemons	United States	45.75	Q
3	2	Nery Brenes	Costa Rica	45.85	Q
4	2	Machel Cedenio	Trinidad and Tobago	46.06	Q
5	2	Alberth Bravo	Venezuela	46.09	Q
6	1	Jarrin Solomon	Trinidad and Tobago	46.16	Q
7	1	Hugo de Sousa	Brazil	46.26	q
8	1	Winston George	Guyana	46.39	q
9	2	Raidel Acea	Cuba	46.43	
10	2	Gustavo Cuesta	Dominican Republic	46.53	
11	1	Philip Osei	Canada	46.80	
12	2	LaToy Williams	Bahamas	46.81	
13	2	Marcus Chambers	United States	46.91	
14	2	Daniel Harper	Canada	47.56	
15	1	Bralon Taplin	Grenada	47.61	
16	1	Ramon Miller	Bahamas	48.54	

=== Final ===
Rank	Name	Nationality	Time	Notes
1st place, gold medalist(s)	Luguelín Santos	Dominican Republic	44.56	SB
2nd place, silver medalist(s)	Machel Cedenio	Trinidad and Tobago	44.70	
3rd place, bronze medalist(s)	Kyle Clemons	United States	44.84	PB
4	Nery Brenes	Costa Rica	44.85	SB
5	Jarrin Solomon	Trinidad and Tobago	45.20	
6	Winston George	Guyana	45.58	
7	Hugo de Sousa	Brazil	46.07	
	Alberth Bravo	Venezuela	DSQ	
