= 2014 IAAF World Relays – Men's 4 × 400 metres relay =

Men's 4 × 400 metres relay at the 2014 IAAF World Relays
- Venue: Thomas Robinson Stadium
- Dates: 24 May (heats) & 25 May (final)

The men's 4 × 400 metres relay at the 2014 IAAF World Relays was held at the Thomas Robinson Stadium on 24–25 May.

== Records ==
Prior to the competition, the records were as follows:

World record	United States (Andrew Valmon, Quincy Watts, Harry Reynolds, Michael Johnson)	2:54.29	Stuttgart, Germany	22 August 1993
Championship record	New event			
World Leading	(United States) University of Florida	2:59.73	Gainesville, United States	5 April 2014
African Record	Nigeria (Clement Chukwu, Jude Monye, Sunday Bada, Enefiok Udo-Obong)	2:58.68	Sydney, Australia	30 September 2000
Asian Record	Japan (Shunji Karube, Koji Ito, Jun Osakada, Shigekazu Omori)	3:00.76	Atlanta, United States	3 August 1996
North, Central American and Caribbean record	United States (Andrew Valmon, Quincy Watts, Harry Reynolds, Michael Johnson)	2:54.29	Stuttgart, Germany	22 August 1993
South American Record	Brazil (Eronilde de Araújo, Cleverson da Silva, Claudinei da Silva, Sanderlei Parrela)	2:58.56	Winnipeg, Canada	30 July 1999
European Record	Great Britain (Iwan Thomas, Jamie Baulch, Mark Richardson, Roger Black)	2:56.60	Atlanta, United States	3 August 1996
Oceanian record	Australia (Bruce Frayne, Gary Minihan, Richard Mitchell, Darren Clark)	2:59.70	Los Angeles, United States	11 August 1984

== Schedule ==
Date	Time	Round
24 May 2014	18:55	Heats
25 May 2014	19:21	Final

All times are local times (UTC-4)

== Results ==
KEY:	q	Fastest non-qualifiers	Q	Qualified	NR	National record	PB	Personal best	SB	Seasonal best

=== Heats ===
Qualification: First 2 of each heat (Q) plus the 2 fastest times (q) advanced to the final.

Rank	Heat	Lane	Nation	Athletes	Time	Notes
1	3	5	Bahamas	Demetrius Pinder, Ramon Miller, Chris Brown, Michael Mathieu	3:00.30	Q, CR
2	1	4	Great Britain	Michael Bingham, Conrad Williams, Nigel Levine, Martyn Rooney	3:00.74	Q, SB
3	3	3	Trinidad and Tobago	Lalonde Gordon, Renny Quow, Machel Cedenio, Jarrin Solomon	3:01.06	Q, SB
4	2	3	United States	David Verburg, Clayton Parros, Torrin Lawrence, Christian Taylor	3:01.09	Q
5	2	4	Jamaica	Javere Bell, Edino Steele, Dane Hyatt, Rusheen McDonald	3:01.17	Q, SB
6	1	6	Venezuela	Arturo Ramírez, Alberth Bravo, José Meléndez, Freddy Mezones	3:01.96	Q, SB
7	3	8	Cuba	William Collazo, Raidel Acea, Adrian Chacón, Yoandys Lescay	3:02.43	q, SB
8	1	3	Brazil	Pedro Luiz de Oliveira, Wagner Cardoso, Anderson Henriques, Hugo de Sousa	3:02.78	q, SB
9	3	4	Belgium	Kevin Borlée, Julien Watrin, Dylan Borlée, Jonathan Borlée	3:02.79	SB
10	2	7	France	Mame-Ibra Anne, Teddy Venel, Patrice Maurice, Thomas Jordier	3:03.74	SB
11	3	2	Japan	Yusuke Ishitsuka, Yuzo Kanemaru, Kaisei Yui, Kazuya Watanabe,	3:04.25	SB
12	1	8	Dominican Republic	Gustavo Cuesta, Joel Mejía, Juander Santos, Luguelín Santos	3:04.44	SB
13	2	5	Nigeria	Isah Salihu, Cristian Morton, Tobi Ogunmola, Noah Akwu	3:04.48	SB
14	1	5	Australia	Alexander Beck, Dylan Grant, Josh Ralph, Craig Burns	3:04.64	SB
15	1	7	Kenya	Mark Kiprotich Muttai, Alexander Lerionka Sampao, Solomon Odongo Buoga, Boniface Mucheru Tumuti	3:04.69	SB
16	2	2	Canada	Daniel Harper, Daundre Barnaby, Philip Osei, Michael Robertson	3:04.85	SB
17	2	8	Russia	Sergey Petukhov, Pavel Trenikhin, Yuriy Trambovetsky, Pavel Ivashko	3:05.00	SB
17	3	6	Puerto Rico	Héctor Carrasquillo, Javier Culson, Wesley Vázquez, Carlos Rodríguez	3:05.00	SB
19	3	7	Poland	Rafał Omelko, Kacper Kozłowski, Łukasz Krawczuk, Marcin Marciniszyn	3:05.16	SB
20	2	6	Saudi Arabia	Ismail Al-Sabiani, Ahmed Yahya Al-Khayri, Yousef Ahmad Masrahi, Ali Al-Deraan	3:06.37	SB

=== Final ===
==== Final B ====
Rank	Lane	Nation	Athletes	Time	Notes
9	6	Belgium	Dylan Borlée, Jonathan Borlée, Julien Watrin, Kevin Borlée	3:02.97	
10	3	Japan	Kaisei Yui, Yuzo Kanemaru, Yusuke Ishitsuka, Kazuya Watanabe	3:03.24	SB
11	4	Dominican Republic	Gustavo Cuesta, Luguelín Santos, Yon Soriano, Juander Santos	3:03.41	SB
12	7	Nigeria	Isah Salihu, Cristian Morton, Elvis Ukale, Noah Akwu	3:04.49	
13	8	Australia	Craig Burns, Dylan Grant, Joshua Ralph, Alexander Beck	3:04.61	SB
14	1	Canada	Daniel Harper, Daundre Barnaby, Tremaine Harris, Philip Osei	3:04.67	SB
15	2	Kenya	Mark Kiprotich Muttai, Solomon Odongo Buoga, Alexander Lerionka Sampao, Boniface Mucheru Tumuti	3:05.81	
	5	France		DNS	

==== Final A ====
Rank	Lane	Nation	Athletes	Time	Notes	Points
1st place, gold medalist(s)	4	United States	David Verburg, Tony McQuay, Christian Taylor, LaShawn Merritt	2:57.25	CR	8
2nd place, silver medalist(s)	6	Bahamas	LaToy Williams, Demetrius Pinder, Chris Brown, Michael Mathieu	2:57.59	SB	7
3rd place, bronze medalist(s)	5	Trinidad and Tobago	Lalonde Gordon, Renny Quow, Machel Cedenio, Jarrin Solomon	2:58.34	NR	6
4	3	Great Britain	Michael Bingham, Conrad Williams, Nigel Levine, Martyn Rooney	3:00.32	SB	5
5	2	Cuba	William Collazo, Raidel Acea, Adrian Chacón, Yoandys Lescay	3:00.61	SB	4
6	7	Venezuela	Arturo Ramírez, Alberth Bravo, José Meléndez, Freddy Mezones	3:01.44	SB	3
7	1	Brazil	Pedro Luiz de Oliveira, Wagner Cardoso, Anderson Henriques, Jonathan da Silva	3:03.87		2
8	8	Jamaica	Dane Hyatt, Chumaine Fitten, Omar Johnson, Edino Steele	3:10.23		1
