= 2017 World Championships in Athletics – Men's 4 × 400 metres relay =

Sporting event

Men's 4 × 400 metres relay at the 2017 World Championships
- Venue: Olympic Stadium
- Dates: 12 August (heats); 13 August (final)
- Competitors: 69 from 16 nations
- Winning time: 2:58.12

Medalists
gold medal	Jarrin Solomon; Jereem Richards; Machel Cedenio; Lalonde Gordon; Renny Quow*	Trinidad and Tobago
silver medal	Wilbert London III; Gil Roberts; Michael Cherry; Fred Kerley; Tony McQuay*	United States
bronze medal	Matthew Hudson-Smith; Rabah Yousif; Dwayne Cowan; Martyn Rooney; Jack Green*	Great Britain

Video on YouTube Official Video

The men's 4 × 400 metres relay at the 2017 World Championships in Athletics was held at the London Olympic Stadium on 12 August.

== Summary ==
The final race of the World Championships started fairly even, with USA's Wilbert London III and Britain's Matthew Hudson-Smith gaining slightly on the stagger on the inside, while Spain's Óscar Husillos was gaining on Trinidad and Tobago's Jarrin Solomon further toward the outside. Belgium's Robin Vanderbemden also looked to be having a strong leg all alone in lane 9. Coming down the homestretch, London sped up to have the USA the handoff first to Gil Roberts. Roberts came around the turn to take a 3-metre lead at the break, followed by GBR's Rabah Yousif and Spain's Lucas Búa, TTO's Jereem Richards was on the outside passing people. Into the far turn, he had beaten Yousif and kept going making up the gap on Roberts getting to within a metre. Down the homestretch, Roberts again opened up the gap, handing off to Michael Cherry three metres ahead of Trinidad and Tobago's handoff to Machel Cedenio. Great Britain's handoff to Dwayne Cowan was just a metre back as the top three teams had separated from the rest of the contenders. Through most of the lap, Cherry held a five-metre lead while Cowan was challenging Cedenio. Cedenio held off Cowan then on the homestretch he separated, making a run at Cherry. USA passed to Fred Kerley barely a metre ahead of TTO's pass to Lalonde Gordon. Kerley was the anchor runner of the fastest 4x400 relay of the year prior to the championships, running for Texas A&M at the end of the college season more than two months earlier. Kerley held that one-metre lead down the backstretch, then widened it slightly through the final turn. Behind Gordon, GBR's Martyn Rooney was closing down the gap to bring his team to within a metre coming off the turn. Kerley straightened up and ran tight for the finish while Gordon went to the outside for running room and ran past him, pulling away to a decisive 3-metre victory. Kerley maintained his distance from Rooney to get silver for USA. GBR's Rooney finished 8 metres ahead of the Belgian team, which included three Borlée brothers.

== Records ==
Before the competition records were as follows:

Record	Perf.	Team	Date	Location
World	2:54.29	United States; Andrew Valmon, Quincy Watts, Butch Reynolds, Michael Duane Johnson	22 Aug 1993	Stuttgart, Germany
Championship	2:54.29	United States; Andrew Valmon, Quincy Watts, Butch Reynolds, Michael Duane Johnson	22 Aug 1993	Stuttgart, Germany
World leading	2:59.95	Texas A&M University; Richard Rose, My'Lik Kerley, Robert Grant, Fred Kerley	7 Jun 2017	Eugene, United States
African	2:58.68	Nigeria; Clement Chukwu, Jude Monye, Sunday Bada, Enefiok Udo-Obong	30 Sep 2000	Sydney, Australia
Asian	3:00.76	Japan; Shunji Karube, Koji Ito, Jun Osakada, Shigekazu Omori	3 Aug 1996	Atlanta, United States
NACAC	2:54.29	United States; Andrew Valmon, Quincy Watts, Harry Reynolds, Michael Johnson	22 Aug 1993	Stuttgart, Germany
South American	2:58.56	Brazil; Eronilde de Araújo, Cleverson da Silva, Claudinei da Silva, Sanderlei Parrela	30 Jul 1999	Winnipeg, Canada
European	2:56.60	Great Britain; Iwan Thomas, Mark Richardson, Jamie Baulch, Roger Black	3 Aug 1996	Atlanta, United States
Oceanian	2:59.70	Australia; Bruce Frayne, Gary Minihan, Rick Mitchell, Darren Clark	11 Aug 1984	Los Angeles, United States

The following records were set at the competition:

Record	Perf.	Team	Date
World leading	2:58.12	Trinidad and Tobago; Jarrin Solomon, Jereem Richards, Machel Cedenio, Lalonde Gordon	13 Aug 2017
Trinidad and Tobago	2:58.12	Trinidad and Tobago; Jarrin Solomon, Jereem Richards, Machel Cedenio, Lalonde Gordon	13 Aug 2017
World leading	2:59.23	United States; Wilbert London III, Bryshon Nellum, Michael Cherry, Tony McQuay	12 Aug 2017
Spanish	3:00.65	Spain; Óscar Husillos, Lucas Búa, Darwin Echeverry, Samuel García	13 Aug 2017

== Qualification criteria ==
The first eight placed teams at the 2017 IAAF World Relays and the host country qualify automatically for entry with remaining places being filled by teams with the fastest performances during the qualification period.

== Schedule ==
The event schedule, in local time (UTC+1), is as follows:

Date	Time	Round
12 August	11:50	Heats
13 August	21:15	Final

== Results ==
=== Heats ===
Video on YouTube Official Video

The first round took place on 12 August in two heats as follows:

Heat	1	2
Start time	11:50	12:00
Photo finish	link	link

The first three in each heat ( Q ) and the next two fastest ( q ) qualified for the final. The overall results were as follows:

Rank	Heat	Lane	Nation	Athletes	Time	Notes
1	2	9	United States	Wilbert London III, Bryshon Nellum, Michael Cherry, Tony McQuay	2:59.23	Q, WL
2	2	8	Trinidad and Tobago	Renny Quow, Jereem Richards, Machel Cedenio, Lalonde Gordon	2:59.35	Q, SB
3	2	3	Belgium	Dylan Borlée, Jonathan Borlée, Robin Vanderbemden, Kevin Borlée	2:59.47	Q, SB
4	2	6	Great Britain & N.I.	Rabah Yousif, Dwayne Cowan, Jack Green, Martyn Rooney	3:00.10	q, SB
5	2	4	France	Ludvy Vaillant, Thomas Jordier, Mamoudou Hanne, Teddy Atine-Venel	3:00.93	q, SB
6	1	9	Spain	Óscar Husillos, Lucas Búa, Darwin Echeverry, Samuel García	3:01.72	Q, SB
7	1	7	Poland	Kajetan Duszyński, Łukasz Krawczuk, Tymoteusz Zimny, Rafał Omelko	3:01.78	Q, SB
8	1	5	Cuba	William Collazo, Adrian Chacón, Leandro Zamora, Yoandys Lescay	3:01.88	Q, SB
9	1	8	Jamaica	Peter Matthews, Steven Gayle, Jamari Rose, Rusheen McDonald	3:01.98	SB
10	1	3	India	Kunhu Muhammed, Amoj Jacob, Mohammad Anas, Arokia Rajiv	3:02.80	SB
11	1	4	Bahamas	Alonzo Russell, Michael Mathieu, O'Jay Ferguson, Ramon Miller	3:03.04	SB
12	1	2	Colombia	Jhon Alexander Solís, Diego Palomeque, Yilmar Herrera, Jhon Perlaza	3:03.68	SB
13	2	5	Brazil	Lucas Carvalho, Alexander Russo, Anderson Henriques, Hugo de Sousa	3:04.02	SB
14	2	7	Botswana	Onkabetse Nkobolo, Baboloki Thebe, Nijel Amos, Karabo Sibanda	3:06.50	
15	2	2	Japan	Kentaro Sato, Yuzo Kanemaru, Kazushi Kimura, Kosuke Horii	3:07.29	
16	1	6	Turkey	Ahmet Kasap, Batuhan Altıntaş, Mahsum Korkmaz, Yavuz Can	3:15.45	

=== Final ===
The final took place on 13 August at 22:20. The results were as follows (photo finish):

Rank	Lane	Nation	Athletes	Time	Notes
1st place, gold medalist(s)	7	Trinidad and Tobago	Jarrin Solomon, Jereem Richards, Machel Cedenio, Lalonde Gordon	2:58.12	WL, NR
2nd place, silver medalist(s)	4	United States	Wilbert London III, Gil Roberts, Michael Cherry, Fred Kerley	2:58.61	SB
3rd place, bronze medalist(s)	3	Great Britain & N.I.	Matthew Hudson-Smith, Rabah Yousif, Dwayne Cowan, Martyn Rooney	2:59.00	SB
4	9	Belgium	Robin Vanderbemden, Jonathan Borlée, Dylan Borlée, Kevin Borlée	3:00.04	
5	6	Spain	Óscar Husillos, Lucas Búa, Darwin Echeverry, Samuel García	3:00.65	NR
6	8	Cuba	William Collazo, Adrian Chacón, Osmaidel Pellicier, Yoandys Lescay	3:01.10	SB
7	5	Poland	Kajetan Duszyński, Rafał Omelko, Łukasz Krawczuk, Tymoteusz Zimny	3:01.59	SB
DSQ	2	France	Ludvy Vaillant, Thomas Jordier, Mamoudou Hanne, Teddy Atine-Venel	3:01.79	
