= Adrián Chacón =

Cuban sprinter (born 1988)

Adrian Chacón
Personal information
- Nationality: Cuban
- Born: December 10, 1988 (age 37)
- Height: 1.87 m (6 ft 1 1/2 in)
- Weight: 90 kg (198 lb)

Sport
- Sport: Track and field
- Event: 400 metres

Achievements and titles
- Personal best: 400 m: 45.91 (2015)
Medal record
Representing Cuba
Men's athletics
Pan American Games
Silver medal – second place	2015 Toronto	4 × 400 m relay
NACAC Championships
Bronze medal – third place	2015 San José	4 × 400 m relay

Adrian Chacón Muñoz (born 10 December 1988) is a Cuban track and field sprinter who competes in the 400 metres. He represented his country at the 2016 Rio Olympics. His personal best for the 400 m is 45.91 seconds, set in 2015.

Internationally, he competes mainly with the Cuban 4 × 400 metres relay team. He is a two-time participant at the IAAF World Relays and was a finalist at the 2015 World Championships in Athletics with William Collazo, Raidel Acea and Yoandys Lescay. Medals came with Collazo, Lescay and Osmaidel Pellicier at the 2015 NACAC Championships in Athletics and the Pan American Games. The quartet regrouped for the 2016 Olympic Games and placed sixth in the final with a time of 2:59.53 minutes.

== Personal bests ==
- 200 metres – 21.23 (2015)
- 400 metres – 45.91 (2015)
- 4 × 400 metres relay – 2:59.53 (2016)

All information from All-Athletics profile.

== International competitions ==
Year	Competition	Venue	Position	Event	Notes
2014	World Relays	Nassau, Bahamas	5th	4 × 400 m relay	3:00.61
2015	World Relays	Nassau, Bahamas	2nd (B-final)	4 × 400 m relay	3:03.73
2015	Pan American Games	Toronto, Canada	2nd	4 × 400 m relay	2:59.84
2015	NACAC Championships	San José, Costa Rica	3rd	4 × 400 m relay	3:01.22
2015	World Championships	Moscow, Russia	7th	4 × 400 m relay	3:03.05
2016	Olympic Games	Rio de Janeiro, Brazil	6th	4 × 400 m relay	2:59.53
2017	World Relays	Nassau, Bahamas	5th	4 × 400 m relay	3:03.60
2017	World Championships	London, United Kingdom	6th	4 × 400 m relay	3:01.10
2018	Central American and Caribbean Games	Barranquilla, Colombia	14th (h)	400 m	47.57
2018	Central American and Caribbean Games	Barranquilla, Colombia	1st	4 × 400 m relay	3:03.87
2018	NACAC Championships	Toronto, Canada	3rd	4 × 400 m relay	3:04.11
