= Jereem Richards =

Trinidad and Tobago sprinter (born 1994)

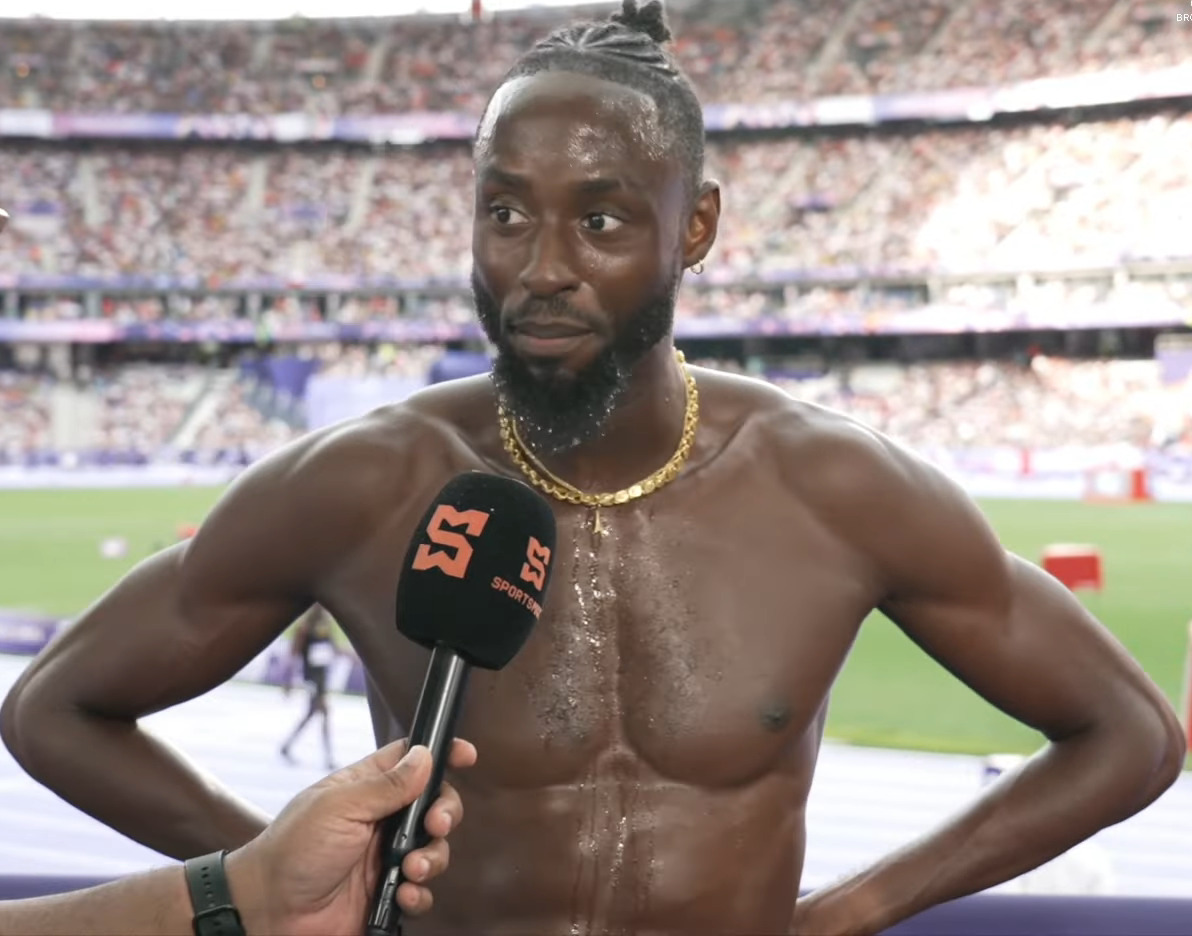
- Richards at the 2024 Summer Olympics in Paris

Personal information
- Born: 13 January 1994 (age 32) Point Fortin, Trinidad and Tobago
- Height: 1.89 m (6 ft 2 in)
- Weight: 71 kg (157 lb)
- Spouse: married in 2020

Sport
- Sport: Athletics
- Events: 200 metres, 400 metres
- College team: Alabama Crimson Tide
- Coached by: Lance Brauman

Achievements and titles
- Personal bests: 200 m: 19.80 (Birmingham 2022); 400 m: 43.68 NR (Brussels 2026)
Medal record
Men's athletics
Representing Trinidad and Tobago
World Championships
Gold medal – first place	2017 London	4 × 400 m relay
Silver medal – second place	2025 Tokyo	400 m
Bronze medal – third place	2017 London	200 m
World Ultimate Championship
Third place	2026 Budapest	400 m
World Indoor Championships
Gold medal – first place	2022 Belgrade	400 m
Bronze medal – third place	2012 Istanbul	4 × 400 m relay
Bronze medal – third place	2026 Toruń	400 metres
World Relays
Gold medal – first place	2019 Yokohama	4 × 400 m relay
Commonwealth Games
Gold medal – first place	2018 Gold Coast	200 m
Gold medal – first place	2022 Birmingham	200 m
Silver medal – second place	2026 Glasgow	400 m
Pan American Games
Silver medal – second place	2019 Lima	200 m
Bronze medal – third place	2019 Lima	4 × 400 m relay
Central American and Caribbean Games
Gold medal – first place	2023 San Salvador	400 m
Gold medal – first place	2023 San Salvador	4 × 400 m relay
CAC Championships
Bronze medal – third place	2013 Morelia	4 × 100 m relay
Pan American Junior Championships
Silver medal – second place	2011 Miramar	4 × 400 m relay
CAC Junior Championships
Silver medal – second place	2012 San Salvador	200 m
Bronze medal – third place	2012 San Salvador	4 × 100 m relay
CARIFTA Games (Junior)
Gold medal – first place	2011 Montego Bay	4 × 400 m relay
Silver medal – second place	2012 Hamilton	4 × 400 m relay
Silver medal – second place	2013 Nassau	4 × 100 m relay
Silver medal – second place	2013 Nassau	4 × 400 m relay
Bronze medal – third place	2013 Nassau	200 m
CAC Junior Championships (U17)
Silver medal – second place	2010 Santo Domingo	4 × 400 m relay
Bronze medal – third place	2010 Santo Domingo	4 × 100 m relay

Jereem Richards (born 13 January 1994) is a Trinidadian track and field sprinter who specializes in the 200 metres and 400 metres events. He won the bronze medal in the 200 m at the 2017 World Championships in Athletics and gold for the 400 m at the 2022 World Indoor Championships. Richards took 200 m titles at both the 2018 and 2022 Commonwealth Games. He was part of the Trinidad and Tobago team that won the bronze medal in the men's 4 × 400 m relay at the 2012 World Indoor Championships and a gold medal at the 2017 World Championships in Athletics.

Richards is the Trinidad and Tobago record holder for the 400 m and for the 200 m and 400 m indoor. He has won four individual national titles.

== Personal life ==
Jereem Richards hails from Point Fortin, Trinidad and Tobago. He attended the Vessigny Secondary School at his home island. From 2011 to 2013 he attended A.S.J.A Boys’ College where he excelled academically. In 2014–15, he attended South Plains College in Levelland, Texas, and then transferred to University of Alabama in 2016. In September the following year, Richards forfeited his eligibility to compete in college to turn professional.

== Career ==
His first major competition was the 2012 World Indoor Championships held in Istanbul, Turkey. There, he ran the third leg of Trinidad and Tobago's 4 × 400 m relay, which won the bronze medal.

=== 2017 ===
2017 became a breakout season for Richards. He opened his athletics year with a wind‑assisted 19.98 seconds in the 200 metres. Sixteen days later he ran his first legal sub-20 with 19.97 s, lowering his personal best by over half a second. He won the national 200 m title in 20.15 seconds, allowing him to compete at the London World Championships later that year. He also improved his 400 m personal best by 0.7 seconds with 45.27 s.

Richards made his outdoor World Championship debut at London 2017. Competing in the 200 m, he ran the fastest time in the heats of 20.05 s, and the next day he won his semi-final in 20.14 s. He then went on to win the bronze medal in the final; Ramil Guliyev of Turkey won gold in 20.09 s, while Wayde Van Niekerk of South Africa beat Richards to the silver medal by exactly 1/1000 of a second, clocking 20.106 to 20.107 s. Richards stated that his race had been undermined when he slipped coming out of his blocks. "I tried my best not to let it affect me too much," he said. "At the turn I wasn't in contention really, so to get a medal from there is a great achievement." Three days later, he ran the second leg for Trinidad and Tobago in the men's 4 × 400 m relay, making considerable ground off the USA's Gil Roberts before handing the baton to Machel Cedenio. The team ultimately went on to win gold. The team went on to be named Best Male Athletes from Americas at the 2017 ANOC Awards.

In September later that year, Richards announced that he was turning professional and foregoing his final year of collegiate eligibility; he signed an endorsement deal with Adidas. Despite turning pro, he remained enrolled at Alabama to continue work towards his degree.

=== 2018–2021 ===
In March 2018, he competed in the World Indoor Championships in Birmingham, as the second leg of Trinidad and Tobago's 4 × 400 m relay. Despite being the defending champions, they ultimately came fourth. Richards tried to overcome Poland on the second leg but remained third on the second lap. Lalonde Gordon eased down on the line, giving Belgium the bronze. He won gold in the 200 m at the 2018 Commonwealth Games in the Gold Coast, he had initially finished second behind England's Zharnel Hughes, but Hughes was later disqualified for jostling as he accidentally hit Richards in the final 30 m.

At the 2019 World Relays, Richards helped the Trinidad and Tobago quartet including Deon Lendore, Asa Guevara and Machel Cedenio to win gold in the 4 × 400 m relay. At the 2019 World Championships held in Doha, Richards competed in the 200 m where he made the semi-finals. After failing to qualify for the final, Richards said that he had "Never been more disappointed in myself before."

Richards qualified for the delayed 2020 Summer Olympics held in Tokyo in the men's 200-metre event, and clocked a season's best time of 20.10 s while finishing in third place in his semi-final to advance to the final. In the final, he finished eighth in 20.39 s. He went on to place eighth in the final as part of Trinidad and Tobago's men's 4 × 400 m relay team.

=== 2022–present ===
In 2022, at the World Indoor Championships held in Belgrade, Serbia, he won gold in the men's 400 m event breaking Trinidad and Tobago's national indoor record as well as the championship record of 45.11 s which was formerly held by Nery Brenes of Costa Rica since 2012. Richards' time of 45.00 s broke Deon Lendore's former national record of 45.05 s. Richards ran in tribute to Lendore's memory as he died on 10 January 2022 in a car accident in Texas where he lived. On 28 May, Richards set a new personal best of 44.79 s over 400 m in finishing fifth at the Prefontaine Classic.

In June 2022, Richards won the 200 m at the Trinidad & Tobago Championships in a personal best of 19.83 s. He competed at the 2022 World Championships where he finished sixth in the 200 m. He also placed fifth as part of the Trinidadian men's 4 × 400 m relay.

At the Birmingham Commonwealth Games in United Kingdom, Richards won the 200 m title for the second time beating England's Zharnel Hughes. Richards' time of 19.80 s broke the Commonwealth Games record of 19.97 s which was previously held by Frankie Fredericks of Namibia and it also made Richards the second fastest Trinbagonian of all time behind Ato Boldon. Later, at the Games' final event which was the men's 4 × 400 m relay, Richards anchored the Trinidad and Tobago quartet to gold in a time of 3:01:59 earning his second gold medal of the Games and the most of any Trinbagonian athlete competing at the Commonwealths.

In July 2023, Richards won the 400 m at the CAC Games in San Salvador in a new personal best of 44.54 s. He went on to win another gold as part of the men's 4 × 400 m relay. At the 2023 World Championships, Richards competed in the 400 m, where he made it to the semi-finals.

In 2024, Richards set a big personal best over 400 m of 44.18 s in finishing third at the London Diamond League. At the 2024 Paris Olympics, Richards finished fourth in the 400 m in a national record of 43.78 s, finishing behind bronze-medallist Muzala Samukonga by just 0.04 s. His time surpassed Machel Cedenio's previous national record of 44.01 s, meaning Richards was the first Trinidadian to run a sub-44 400 m. However, he ultimately fell short of his Olympic medal finish, having finished in 4th. In October 2024, it was announced that he had signed up for the inaugural season of the Michael Johnson founded Grand Slam Track.

In April 2025 Richards competed in the Long Sprints (200 and 400 metres) category during the Kingston Slam. Finishing sixth in the 200 metres and second in the 400 metres awarded him a third place in the Long Sprints category. Richards became the Long Sprints champion during the Miami Slam, by coming in first in the 200 metres and second in the 400 metres. Richards once again ranked third in the Long Sprints category during the Philadelphia Slam, after finishing third in the 400 metres and second in the 200 metres.

In September 2025 Richards won a silver medal in the 400 metres at the World Championships in Tokyo, improving his personal best and national record to 43.72. He shared the podium with Botswanan athletes Collen Kebinatshipi and Bayapo Ndori.

== Achievements ==
=== International competitions ===
Representing Trinidad and Tobago
Year	Competition	Venue	Position	Event	Time
2010	CAC Junior Championships (U17)	Santo Domingo, Dominican Republic	3rd	4 × 100 m relay	41.98
2010	CAC Junior Championships (U17)	Santo Domingo, Dominican Republic	2nd	4 × 400 m relay	3:17.54
2011	CARIFTA Games (U20)	Montego Bay, Jamaica	6th	400 m	49.22
2011	CARIFTA Games (U20)	Montego Bay, Jamaica	1st	4 × 400 m relay	3:08.96
2011	World Youth Championships	Villeneuve-d'Ascq, France	10th (sf)	200 m	21.47
2011	World Youth Championships	Villeneuve-d'Ascq, France	6th	Medley relay	1:52.77
2011	Pan American Junior Championships	Miramar, FL, United States	2nd	4 × 400 m relay	3:13.27
2012	World Indoor Championships	Istanbul, Turkey	3rd	4 × 400 m relay	3:06.85 NR
2012	CARIFTA Games (U20)	Hamilton, Bermuda	5th	200 m	21.41
2012	CARIFTA Games (U20)	Hamilton, Bermuda	2nd	4 × 400 m relay	3:11.62
2012	CAC Junior Championships	San Salvador, El Salvador	2nd	200 m	20.98
2012	CAC Junior Championships	San Salvador, El Salvador	3rd	4 × 100 m relay	39.99
2012	World Junior Championships	Barcelona, Spain	3rd	4 × 400 m relay	3:06.32
2013	CARIFTA Games (U20)	Nassau, Bahamas	3rd	200 m	20.69 w
2013	CARIFTA Games (U20)	Nassau, Bahamas	2nd	4 × 100 m relay	40.36
2013	CARIFTA Games (U20)	Nassau, Bahamas	2nd	4 × 400 m relay	3:06.23
2013	CAC Championships	Morelia, Mexico	3rd	4 × 100 m relay	39.26
2014	Commonwealth Games	Glasgow, United Kingdom	33rd (h)	200 m	21.13
2017	World Relays	Nassau, Bahamas	4th	4 × 400 m relay	3:03.17
2017	World Championships	London, United Kingdom	3rd	200 m	20.11
2017	World Championships	London, United Kingdom	1st	4 × 400 m relay	2:58.12 WL NR
2018	World Indoor Championships	Birmingham, United Kingdom	4th	4 × 400 m relay	3:02.52 NR
2018	Commonwealth Games	Gold Coast, Australia	1st	200 m	20.12
2018	Commonwealth Games	Gold Coast, Australia	4th	4 × 400 m relay	3:02.85
2019	Pan American Games	Lima, Peru	2nd	200 m	20.38
2019	Pan American Games	Lima, Peru	3rd	4 × 400 m relay	3:02.25
2019	World Championships	Doha, Qatar	10th (sf)	200 m	20.28
2019	World Championships	Doha, Qatar	5th	4 × 400 m relay	3:00.74 SB
2022	World Indoor Championships	Belgrade, Serbia	1st	400 m	45.00 CR NR
2022	World Championships	Eugene, OR, United States	6th	200 m	20,08
2022	World Championships	Eugene, OR, United States	5th	4 × 400 m relay	3:00.03 SB
2022	Commonwealth Games	Birmingham, United Kingdom	1st	200 m	19.80 PB GR
2022	Commonwealth Games	Birmingham, United Kingdom	1st	4 × 400 m relay	3:01.29
2023	Central American and Caribbean Games	San Salvador, El Salvador	1st	400 m	44.54
2023	Central American and Caribbean Games	San Salvador, El Salvador	1st	4 × 400 m relay	3:01.99
2023	World Championships	Budapest, Hungary	8th (sf)	400 m	44.76
2023	World Championships	Budapest, Hungary	14th (h)	4 × 400 m relay	3:01.54
2024	World Indoor Championships	Glasgow, United Kingdom	8th (sf)	400 m	46.64
2024	Olympic Games	Paris, France	4th	400 m	43.78
2024	Olympic Games	Paris, France	15th (h)	4 × 400 m relay	3:06.73
2025	World Championships	Tokyo, Japan	2nd	400 m	43.72
2026	World Indoor Championships	Toruń, Poland	3rd	400 m	45.39
2026	Commonwealth Games	Glasgow, United Kingdom	2nd	400 m	44.82
2026	World Ultimate Championship	Budapest, Hungary	3rd	400 m	44.23

=== Circuit performances ===
Grand Slam Track results
Slam	Race group	Event	Pl.	Time	Prize money
2025 Kingston Slam	Long sprints	400 m	6th	45.35	US$30,000
2025 Kingston Slam	Long sprints	200 m	2nd	20.81	US$30,000
2025 Miami Slam	Long sprints	200 m	1st	19.86	US$100,000
2025 Miami Slam	Long sprints	400 m	2nd	44.32	US$100,000
2025 Philadelphia Slam	Long sprints	400 m	3rd	45.05	US$30,000
2025 Philadelphia Slam	Long sprints	200 m	2nd	20.34	US$30,000

=== Personal bests ===
- 100 metres – 10.23 (+1.4 m/s, Port of Spain 2019)
- 200 metres – 19.80 (+1.1 m/s, Birmingham 2022)
  - 200 metres indoor – 20.31 (College Station, TX 2017) NR
- 300 metres – 33.16 (Port of Spain 2016)
  - 300 metres indoor – 32.10 (Boston, MA 2018)
- 400 metres – 43.68 (Brussels 2026) NR
  - 400 metres indoor – 45.00 (Belgrade 2022) NR

=== National titles ===
- Trinidad and Tobago Championships
  - 200 metres: 2017, 2019, 2022
  - 4 × 100 m relay: 2012, 2022

As of 19 September 2024, Richards holds the track record for 400 metres for San Salvador where on 6 July 2023 he set a time of 44.54 seconds.
