= Bryshon Nellum =

American sprinter (born 1989)

Personal information
- Full name: Bryshon Lorenzo Nellum
- Nationality: American
- Born: May 1, 1989 (age 37)
- Height: 6 ft 0 in (183 cm)
- Weight: 175 lb (79 kg)

Sport
- Sport: Running
- Events: 200 meters, 400 meters
- College team: USC Trojans

Achievements and titles
- Personal bests: 200 m: 20.43 (Sacramento 2007); 400 m: 44.73 (Eugene 2013)
Medal record
Men's athletics
Representing the United States
Olympic Games
Silver medal – second place	2012 London	4 × 400 m relay
World Championships
Gold medal – first place	2015 Beijing	4 × 400 m relay
World Junior Championships
Gold medal – first place	2006 Beijing	4 × 400 m relay
Pan American Junior Championships
Gold medal – first place	2007 São Paulo	400 m
Silver medal – second place	2007 São Paulo	4 × 400 m relay
World Youth Championships
Gold medal – first place	2005 Marrakesh	Medley relay
Bronze medal – third place	2005 Marrakesh	400 m

Bryshon Lorenzo Nellum (born May 1, 1989) is an American sprinter. He graduated from University of Southern California in 2012 with a degree in Public Administration and Social Service Professions and is currently a graduate student.

== Career ==
A native of Los Angeles, California, Nellum attended Long Beach Polytechnic High School, where he also competed in American football as a wide receiver, and was teammates with Terrence Austin, Jurrell Casey, Vaughn Telemaque, and Donovan Warren. He was ranked the No. 70 wide receiver prospect in his class by Rivals.com.

While still in high school, Nellum was named Gatorade Track & Field Athlete of the Year in 2007. In his sophomore year, Nellum finished second to David Gettis in the 400 meters at the 2005 CIF California State Meet. As a junior, he doubled as state champion in the 200 and 400 meters. At the 2007 CIF State Meet, Nellum repeated as 200 and 400 meters champion. In a memorable 200 metres dash, Nellum (state meet record 20.43) ran head-to-head with 100 meters champion Jahvid Best (20.65), narrowly beating him down the stretch. Nellum's and Best's time ranked No. 1 and No. 2 among high school sprinters in 2007, and earned Nellum a consecutive All-USA selection by USA Today. Nellum's time broke a twenty-year-old state record established by Quincy Watts in 1987.

Nellum had to redshirt the 2009 season at USC, after being shot in the leg by two gang members. Nellum was told by doctors that he would probably never again reach world-class speeds as a runner.

On June 24, 2012, in Eugene, Oregon, Bryshon Nellum ran a personal record 44.80—his first sub-45-second time—in the 400 meters at the U.S. Olympic track trials, placing third in the competition and earning a spot on the 2012 Olympic team. At the 2012 Olympics Nellum reached the semi-finals of the individual 400 meters and won a silver medal as part of the 4 × 400 meters relay team. He carried the US flag at the closing ceremony after being chosen by the US athletes.
