= List of Trinidad and Tobago records in athletics =

The following are the national records in athletics in Trinidad and Tobago maintained by the National Association of Athletics Administrations of Trinidad & Tobago (NAAATT).

== Outdoor ==
Key to tables: Awaiting ratification Record not kept by NAAATT Not ratified or later rescinded by NAAATT

=== Men ===
Event	Record	Athlete	Date	Meet	Place	Ref.
100 y	9.35 A (−1.1 m/s)	Hasely Crawford	6 June 1975		Provo, United States	
100 m	9.82 (+1.7 m/s)	Richard Thompson	21 June 2014	National Championships	Port of Spain, Trinidad & Tobago	
150 m (straight)	14.75 (+0.1 m/s)	Jereem Richards	23 May 2021	Adidas Boost Boston Games	Boston, United States	
200 m	19.77 (+0.7 m/s)	Ato Boldon	13 July 1997		Stuttgart, Germany	
200 m straight	20.03 (+0.3 m/s)	Jereem Richards	20 May 2018	Adidas Boost Boston Games	Boston, United States	
400 m	43.68	Jereem Richards	4 September 2026	Memorial Van Damme	Brussels, Belgium	
800 m	1:45.43	Sherridan Kirk	11 June 2005		Sacramento, United States	
1500 m	3:45.09	Sheldon Monderoy	26 July 1998		Lahti, Finland	
Mile	4:02.36	Sheldon Monderoy	9 May 1999		Port of Spain, Trinidad & Tobago	
3000 m	8:14.16	Sheldon Monderoy	30 May 2000		Espoo, Finland	
5000 m	14:12.01	Ronnie Holassie	20 June 1999		Port of Spain, Trinidad and Tobago	
10,000 m	30:30.42	Quintin John	1994		Kingston, Jamaica	
10 km (road)	29:24	Ronnie Holassie	4 March 1995		Winter Haven, United States	
Half marathon	1:04:15	Ronnie Holassie	27 November 1997		Jacksonville, United States	
Marathon	2:13:03	Ronnie Holassie	29 April 2001		Jacksonville, United States	
110 m hurdles	13.17 (+0.8 m/s)	Mikel Thomas	24 July 2015	Pan American Games	Toronto, Canada	
200 m hurdles (straight)	23.00 (+0.1 m/s)	Jehue Gordon	20 May 2012	Manchester City Games	Manchester, United Kingdom	
400 m hurdles	47.69	Jehue Gordon	15 August 2013	World Championships	Moscow, Russia	
3000 m steeplechase	8:49.82	Quintin John	27 May 1994		Raleigh, United States	
High jump	2.17 m	Kareem Roberts	25 June 2017	Trinidad & Tobago Championships	Port of Spain, Trinidad and Tobago	
Pole vault	4.65 m	Eddison Toby	4 August 1995		Ithaca, United States	
Long jump	8.25 m A (+0.7 m/s) (Note: by World Athletics and official result sources; -0.7 m/s by federation source, probably a mistake)	Andwuelle Wright	5 July 2019 (Note: by World Athletics and official result sources; 15 July 2019 by federation source, probably a mistake)	NACAC Under-23 Championships	Queretaro, Mexico	
Triple jump	16.67 m (−0.3 m/s) (Note: indoor mark ratified as absolut record)	LeJuan Simon	8 August 2004		Szombathely, Hungary	
Triple jump	16.87 m (+0.5 m/s)	LeJuan Simon	18 May 2002		Odessa, United States	
Shot put	20.43 m (Note: by World Athletics and federation source; done with a 6 kg implement by other sources, probably a mistake)	Akeem Stewart	16 March 2019	Hurricane Invitational	Coral Gables, United States	
Discus throw	59.65 m	Quincy Wilson	10 July 2016		Bacolet, Trinidad and Tobago	
Discus throw	59.65 m	Quincy Wilson	26 February 2017		Dunedin, New Zealand	
Hammer throw	55.11 m	Emmanuel Stewart	17 April 2015	Legacy Meet	Baltimore, United States	
Javelin throw	90.16 m	Keshorn Walcott	9 July 2015	Athletissima	Lausanne, Switzerland	
Decathlon	7212 pts	Patrick Russell	15–16 July 2005		Winnipeg, Canada	
Decathlon	100m (wind) / Long jump (wind) / Shot put / High jump / 400m / 110m H (wind) / Discus / Pole vault / Javelin / 1500m; 10.98w / 7.24 m w / 13.22 m / 1.89 m / 50.55 / 15.25 (−4.1 m/s) / 41.51 m / 4.10 m / 43.70 m / 4:45.64					
20 km walk (road)	1:47:34	Nolan Simmons	13 May 1978		Coventry, United Kingdom	
50 km walk (road)	4:47:05	Francis Thomas	18 June 1972		Port of Spain, Trinidad and Tobago	
4 × 100 m relay	37.62	Trinidad and Tobago; Darrel Brown; Marc Burns; Emmanuel Callander; Richard Thompson	22 August 2009	World Championships	Berlin, Germany	
4 × 200 m relay	1:21.39	Trinidad and Tobago; Moriba Morain; Dan-Neil Telesford; Kyle Greaux; Emmanuel Callender	23 April 2017	IAAF World Relays	Nassau, Bahamas	
4 × 400 m relay	2:58.12	Trinidad and Tobago; Jarrin Solomon; Jereem Richards; Machel Cedenio; Lalonde Gordon	13 August 2017	World Championships	London, United Kingdom	

=== Women ===
Event	Record	Athlete	Date	Meet	Place	Ref.
100 m	10.82 (+0.9 m/s)	Michelle-Lee Ahye	24 June 2017	Trinidad & Tobago Championships	Port of Spain, Trinidad and Tobago	
150 m (straight)	16.57 (−0.7 m/s)	Michelle-Lee Ahye	20 May 2018	Adidas Boost Boston Games	Boston, United States	
200 m	22.25 (+0.8 m/s)	Michelle-Lee Ahye	16 August 2016	Olympic Games	Rio de Janeiro, Brazil	
200 m (straight)	22.62 (−0.1 m/s)	Michelle-Lee Ahye	23 May 2021	Adidas Boost Boston Games	Boston, United States	
400 m	51.83	Janeil Bellille	21 June 2014	National Championships	Port of Spain, Trinidad & Tobago	
800 m	2:01.81	Alena Brooks	12 April 2018	Commonwealth Games	Gold Coast, Australia	
1500 m	4:13.21	Pilar McShine	27 July 2013	Memorial Geert Rasschaert	Ninove, Belgium	
Mile	4:36.79	Pilar McShine	17 July 2013	Morton Games	Finglas, Ireland	
3000 m	9:18.29	Pilar McShine	9 April 2010	FSU Seminole Invite	Tallahassee, United States	
5000 m	16:19.17 (Note: indoor mark ratified as absolute record)	Tonya Nero	15 April 2011	KT Woodman Classic	Wichita, United States	
5 km (road)	17:14+	Tonya Nero	6 October 2012	World Half Marathon Championships	Kavarna, Bulgaria	
10,000 m	33:11.71	Tonya Nero	25 March 2011	Stanford Invitational	Palo Alto, United States	
10 km (road)	34:45+	Tonya Nero	6 October 2012	World Half Marathon Championships	Kavarna, Bulgaria	
15 km (road)	52:49+	Tonya Nero	6 October 2012	World Half Marathon Championships	Kavarna, Bulgaria	
20 km (road)	1:11:23+	Tonya Nero	6 October 2012	World Half Marathon Championships	Kavarna, Bulgaria	
Half marathon	1:15:13	Tonya Nero	6 October 2012	World Half Marathon Championships	Kavarna, Bulgaria	
25 km (road)	1:34:41+	Tonya Nero	8 December 2019	California International Marathon	Sacramento, United States	
30 km (road)	1:53:50+	Tonya Nero	8 December 2019	California International Marathon	Sacramento, United States	
Marathon	2:42:58	Tonya Nero	8 December 2019	California International Marathon	Sacramento, United States	
100 m hurdles	12.85 (+1.1 m/s)	Aleesha Barber	29 May 2010	NCAA Eastern First Round	Greensboro, United States	
400 m hurdles	53.20	Josanne Lucas	20 August 2009	World Championships	Berlin, Germany	
3000 m steeplechase	10:56.87 (Note: by federation source; 10:57.0 h by World Athletics source)	Scarla Nero	14 May 2011		Cedar Falls, United States	
High jump	1.95 m (Note: record set during heptathlon competition)	Tyra Gittens	13 May 2021	SEC Championships	College Station, United States	
Pole vault	2.36 m	Ayana Riviere	2 May 2008		Baltimore, United States	
Long jump	6.96 m (+2.0 m/s) (Note: record set during heptathlon competition)	Tyra Gittens	14 May 2021	SEC Championships	College Station, United States	
Triple jump	14.40 m (±0.0 m/s)	Ayanna Alexander	28 August 2014	Potomac Valley Games	Alexandria, United States	
Shot put	19.42 m (Note: Outdoor best, indoor mark ratified as absolut record)	Cleopatra Borel-Brown	8 July 2011	Meeting Areva	Saint-Denis, France	
Discus throw	58.58 m	Annie Alexander	28 May 2011	NCAA Regional Preliminaries	Bloomington, United States	
Hammer throw	71.45 m	Candice Scott	15 May 2005		Marietta, United States	
Javelin throw	54.10 m	Geraldine George	8 April 2000		Austin, United States	
Heptathlon	6418 pts	Tyra Gittens	13–14 May 2021	SEC Championships	College Station, United States	
Heptathlon	100m H (wind) / High jump / Shot put / 200m (wind) / Long jump (wind) / Javelin / 800m; 13.47 (+3.0 m/s) / 1.95 m / 11.96 m / 23.43 (±0.0 m/s) / 6.96 m (+2.0 m/s) / 40.18 m / 2:31.97					
20 km walk (road)	2:30:16	Elizabeth London	19 June 2005		Fyzabad, Trinidad and Tobago	
4 × 100 m relay	42.03	Trinidad and Tobago; Kelly-Ann Baptiste; Michelle-Lee Ahye; Reyare Thomas; Semoy Hackett	29 August 2015	World Championships	Beijing, China	
4 × 200 m relay	1:32.62	Trinidad and Tobago; Kamaria Durant; Semoy Hackett; Reyare Thomas; Michelle-Lee Ahye	22 April 2017	IAAF World Relays	Nassau, Bahamas	
Sprint medley relay (1,1,2,4)	1:37.42	Trinidad and Tobago; Khalifa St. Fort (100 m); Reyare Thomas (100 m); Kai Selvon (200 m); Sparkle McKnight (400 m)	28 April 2018	Penn Relays	Philadelphia, United States	
4 × 400 m relay	3:30.37	Trinidad and Tobago; Janeil Bellille; Kai Selvon; Sparkle McKnight; Domonique Williams	10 July 2016	Blue Marlin Track Classic	Nassau, The Bahamas	

=== Mixed ===
Event	Record	Athlete	Date	Meet	Place	Ref.
4 × 400 m relay	3:31.24	Trinidad and Tobago; Keone John; Kyah Hyson; Jaden Clement; Kadija Pickering	31 March 2024	CARIFTA Games	St. George's, Grenada	

== Indoor ==
=== Men ===
Event	Record	Athlete	Date	Meet	Place	Ref.
50 m	5.64+	Ato Boldon	16 February 2000		Madrid, Spain	
55 m	6.04 A	Ato Boldon	1 February 1997		Flagstaff, United States	
60 m	6.49	Ato Boldon	23 February 1997	Aviva Indoor Grand Prix	Birmingham, United Kingdom	
200 m	20.31	Jereem Richards	11 March 2017	NCAA Division I Championships	College Station, United States	
300 m	32.10	Jereem Richards	10 February 2018	New Balance Indoor Grand Prix	Roxbury, United States	
400 m	45.00	Jereem Richards	19 March 2022	World Championships	Belgrade, Serbia	
500 m	1:00.62	Jaden Marchan	31 January 2026	Penn State National Open	State College, United States	
600 m	1:16.19	Jarrin Solomon	16 February 2013	Millrose Games	New York, United States	
800 m	1:46.95	Nathan Cumberbatch	20 March 2026	World Championships	Toruń, Poland	
1500 m	3:47.36	Sheldon Monderoy	6 March 1999	World Championships	Maebashi, Japan	
Mile	4:04.35	Sheldon Monderoy	7 February 1999		Indianapolis, United States	
3000 m	8:24.33 OT	Sheldon Monderoy	12 February 2001	Tampere Indoor Games	Tampere, Finland	
60 m hurdles	7.59	Wayne Davis	9 March 2013	NCAA Division I Championships	Fayetteville, United States	
High jump	2.15 m	Kevin Huggins	7 December 2007		Carbondale, United States	
High jump	2.15 m	Kashef Daniel	1 February 2014	Indiana University Relays	Bloomington, United States	
High jump	2.19 m	Aaron Antoine	12 January 2024	KU-KSU-WSU Triangular	Lawrence, United States	
Pole vault	3.80 m	Vijesh Jadoo	2 February 2018	Rider/TCNJ Dual Meet	Lawrenceville, United States	
Long jump	7.89 m	Wendell Williams	3 February 1999		Erfurt, Germany	
Long jump	7.99 m A	Kelsey Daniel	3 February 2023	New Mexico Collegiate Classic	Albuquerque, United States	
Long jump	8.03 m	Kelsey Daniel	17 January 2025	Arkansas Invitational	Fayetteville, United States	
Long jump	8.16 m	Kelsey Daniel	14 March 2025	NCAA Division I Championships	Virginia Beach, United States	
Long jump	8.21 m	Kelsey Daniel	26 February 2026	SEC Championships	College Station, United States	
Triple jump	16.69 m A	Quincy Howe	24 February 2001		Colorado Springs, United States	
Triple jump	17.05 m (Note: ratified by NAAATT but not recognised by World Athletics)	LeJuan Simon	13 March 2004	NCAA Division I Championships	Fayetteville, United States	
Shot put	18.03 m	Robert Collingwood	25 February 2012	Conference USA Championships	Birmingham, United States	
Weight throw	19.63 m	Emmanuel Stewart	14 February 2014		Landover, United States	
Heptathlon						
Heptathlon	60m / Long jump / Shot put / High jump / 60m H / Pole vault / 1000m					
5000 m walk						
4 × 400 m relay	3:02.52	Trinidad and Tobago; Renny Quow; Jereem Richards; Machel Cedenio; Lalonde Gordon	4 March 2018	World Championships	Birmingham, United Kingdom	

=== Women ===
Event	Record	Athlete	Date	Meet	Place	Ref.
55 m	6.63+	Lisa Raye	8 February 2025	Millrose Games	New York City, United States	
60 m	7.09 (heat)	Michelle-Lee Ahye	19 March 2016	World Championships	Portland, United States	
60 m	7.09 (semifinal)	Michelle-Lee Ahye	19 March 2016	World Championships	Portland, United States	
200 m	22.83	Kayelle Clarke	25 February 2018	SEC Championships	College Station, United States	
300 m	38.18	Aleesha Barber	12 January 2008		State College, United States	
400 m	53.10 A	Afiya Walker	26 February 2011	Mountain West Conference Championships	Albuquerque, United States	
600 m	1:27.56	Alena Brooks	12 January 2018	Arkansas Invitational	Fayetteville, United States	
800 m	2:04.09	Aleena Brooks	10 February 2018	Tyson Invitational	Fayetteville, United States	
1500 m	4:36.87 y	Pilar McShine	14 March 2009	NCAA Division I Championships	College Station, United States	
1500 m	4:35.99 y OT	Pilar McShine	12 February 2010	Husky Classic	Seattle, United States	
Mile	4:36.87	Pilar McShine	14 March 2009	NCAA Division I Championships	College Station, United States	
Mile	4:35.99 OT	Pilar McShine	12 February 2010	Husky Classic	Seattle, United States	
3000 m	9:30.10	Tonya Nero	22 January 2011	Adidas Classic	Lincoln, United States	
5000 m	16:26.42	Tonya Nero	11 March 2011	NCAA Division I Championships	College Station, United States	
5000 m	16:01.69 OT	Tonya Nero	10 February 2011	Iowa State Classic	Ames, United States	
55 m hurdles	7.64	Josanne Lucas	24 February 2006		Gainesville, United States	
60 m hurdles	8.13 (semifinal)	Aleesha Barber	30 January 2009	Texas A&M Showdown: SEC vs. Big 12	State College, United States	
60 m hurdles	8.13 (final)	Aleesha Barber	30 January 2009	Texas A&M Showdown: SEC vs. Big 12	State College, United States	
High jump	1.93 m (Note: outdoor mark ratified as absolute record)	Natasha Alleyne-Gibson	11 February 1995		Lexington, United States	
High jump	1.93 m (Note: record set during pentathlon competition) (Note: outdoor mark ratified as absolute record)	Tyra Gittens	11 March 2021	NCAA Division I Championships	Fayetteville, United States	
Pole vault	2.21 m	Ayana Riviere	16 February 2008		Landover, United States	
Long jump	6.83 m (Note: outdoor mark ratified as absolute record)	Tyra Gittens	30 January 2026	DeLoss Dodds Invitational	Manhattan, United States	
Triple jump	13.99 m	Ayanna Alexander	20 February 2010	Virginia Tech Challenge	Blacksburg, United States	
Shot put	19.48 m	Cleopatra Borel	14 February 2004		Blacksburg, United States	
Weight throw	24.21 m	Candice Scott	27 February 2005		Fayetteville, United States	
Discus throw	50.06 m	Annie Alexander	11 January 2008	Kentucky Invitational	Lexington, United States	
Pentathlon	4746 pts	Tyra Gittens	11 March 2021	NCAA Division I Championships	Fayetteville, United States	
Pentathlon	60m H / High jump / Shot put / Long jump / 800m; 8.27 / 1.93 m / 13.86 m / 6.58 m / 2:28.22					
3000 m walk						
4 × 400 m relay						
