= Steven Gayle =

Jamaican sprinter (born 1994)

Personal information
- Born: 19 March 1994 (age 32)
- Education: South Plains College; University of Alabama
- Height: 1.83 m (6 ft 0 in)
- Weight: 72 kg (159 lb)

Sport
- Sport: Athletics
- Event: 400 metres
- College team: Alabama Crimson Tide
- Coached by: Blaine Wiley

Steven Lloyd Gayle (born 19 March 1994) is a Jamaican sprinter specialising in the 400 metres. He represented his country at the 2017 World Championships and 2018 World Indoor Championships.

== International competitions ==
Year	Competition	Venue	Position	Event	Notes
Representing Jamaica
2017	World Relays	Nassau, Bahamas	3rd	4 × 400 m relay	3:02.84
2017	World Championships	London, United Kingdom	–	400 m	DQ
2017	World Championships	London, United Kingdom	9th (h)	4 × 400 m relay	3:01.98
2018	World Indoor Championships	Birmingham, United Kingdom	–	400 m	DQ
2018	Central American and Caribbean Games	Barranquilla, Colombia	5th	400 m	46.97

== Personal bests ==
Outdoor

- 200 metres – 20.48 (+0.2 m/s, Tallahassee 2017)
- 400 metres – 44.90 (Lexington 2017)

Indoor

- 200 metres – 21.37 (Birmingham 2017)
- 400 metres – 46.01 (College Station 2017)
