= Tony McQuay =

American sprinter

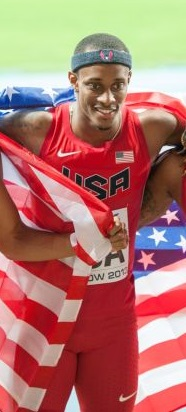
- McQuay at the 2013 World Championships

Personal information
- Born: April 16, 1990 (age 36) West Palm Beach, Florida, U.S.
- Height: 5 ft 11 in (180 cm)
- Weight: 158 lb (72 kg)

Sport
- Country: United States
- Sport: Track and field
- Event: 400 meters
- College team: University of Florida

Achievements and titles
- Personal bests: 200 metres: 20.38 (Helsinki 2012); 400 metres: 44.24 (Eugene 2016)
Medal record
Men's Athletics
Representing the United States
Olympic Games
Gold medal – first place	2016 Rio de Janeiro	4 × 400 m relay
Silver medal – second place	2012 London	4 × 400 m relay
World Championships
Gold medal – first place	2013 Moscow	4 × 400 m relay
Gold medal – first place	2015 Beijing	4 × 400 m relay
Silver medal – second place	2013 Moscow	400 m
Silver medal – second place	2017 London	4 × 400 m relay
World Relay Championships
Gold medal – first place	2014 Nassau	4 × 400 m relay
Gold medal – first place	2015 Nassau	4 × 400 m relay
Gold medal – first place	2017 Nassau	4 × 400 m relay

Tony McQuay (born April 16, 1990) is an American track and field athlete who specializes in the 400 meters. He is a member of the 2012 and 2016 United States Olympic teams, winning a silver medal in the 4 × 400 m relay in 2012 and a gold in the same event in 2016. He is also a two time World Champion in this event.

== Early years ==
McQuay was born in West Palm Beach, Florida. He graduated from Suncoast Community High School in Riviera Beach, Florida, where he ran the 100 meters, 200 meters and 400 meters for the Suncoast Chargers track and field team. He won the FHSAA state championship in the 400 meters as a senior. He also played for the Suncoast Chargers high school football team, and was recognized as the team's most outstanding wide receiver, most improved defensive back, and best all-around player.

== College career ==
McQuay attended the University of Florida in Gainesville, Florida, and was a member of coach Mike Holloway's Florida Gators track and field team in National Collegiate Athletic Association (NCAA) competition. In the 400 meters, McQuay was the 2011 NCAA indoor champion, 2012 NCAA indoor champion, the 2012 outdoor champion, and a two-time Southeastern Conference (SEC) outdoor champion. He won the senior open 400 meters event at the 2011 USA Outdoor Track and Field Championships with a time of 44.68 seconds, edging Olympic gold medalist Jeremy Wariner and world champion Greg Nixon.

== 2012 Olympics ==
McQuay finished second in the 400 meters at the U.S. Olympic Track and Field Trials in the 400 meters on June 24, 2012, qualifying him to run in the 400 meters and 4 × 400 relay at the 2012 Summer Olympics in London, England. He finished second in his heat at the London Olympics with a time of 45.48, qualifying him into the semi-finals where he was eliminated after placing fourth. In the 4 × 400 m, he ran the third leg of the race to help his team win silver behind the Bahamians.

== 2013 World Championships ==
Tony McQuay finished second in the 400 meters at the 2013 IAAF World Championships in Athletics in Moscow, Russia with a personal best time of 44.40 seconds. He was also part of the US 4 × 400 metres team that won gold there.

== 2015 World Championships ==
McQuay was part of the US team that won the gold medal at the 2015 World Championships in Beijing.

== 2016 Olympics ==
McQuay was a member of the U.S. 4 × 400 metres relay team that qualified for the finals with the second fastest time (2:58,38), coming behind Jamaica. In the final, the United States became Olympic champions in a time of 2:57,30, with Jamaica second and Bahamas third. McQuay earned his second Olympic medal. McQuay's 400 m race split was 43.5 as reported by announcer Ato Bolden.

== 2017 World Championships ==
The United States team including McQuay, finished in second at the 2017 World Championships.

== See also ==
- Florida Gators
- List of Olympic medalists in athletics (men)
- List of University of Florida Olympians
