= Hugo de Sousa =

Brazilian sprinter (born 1987)

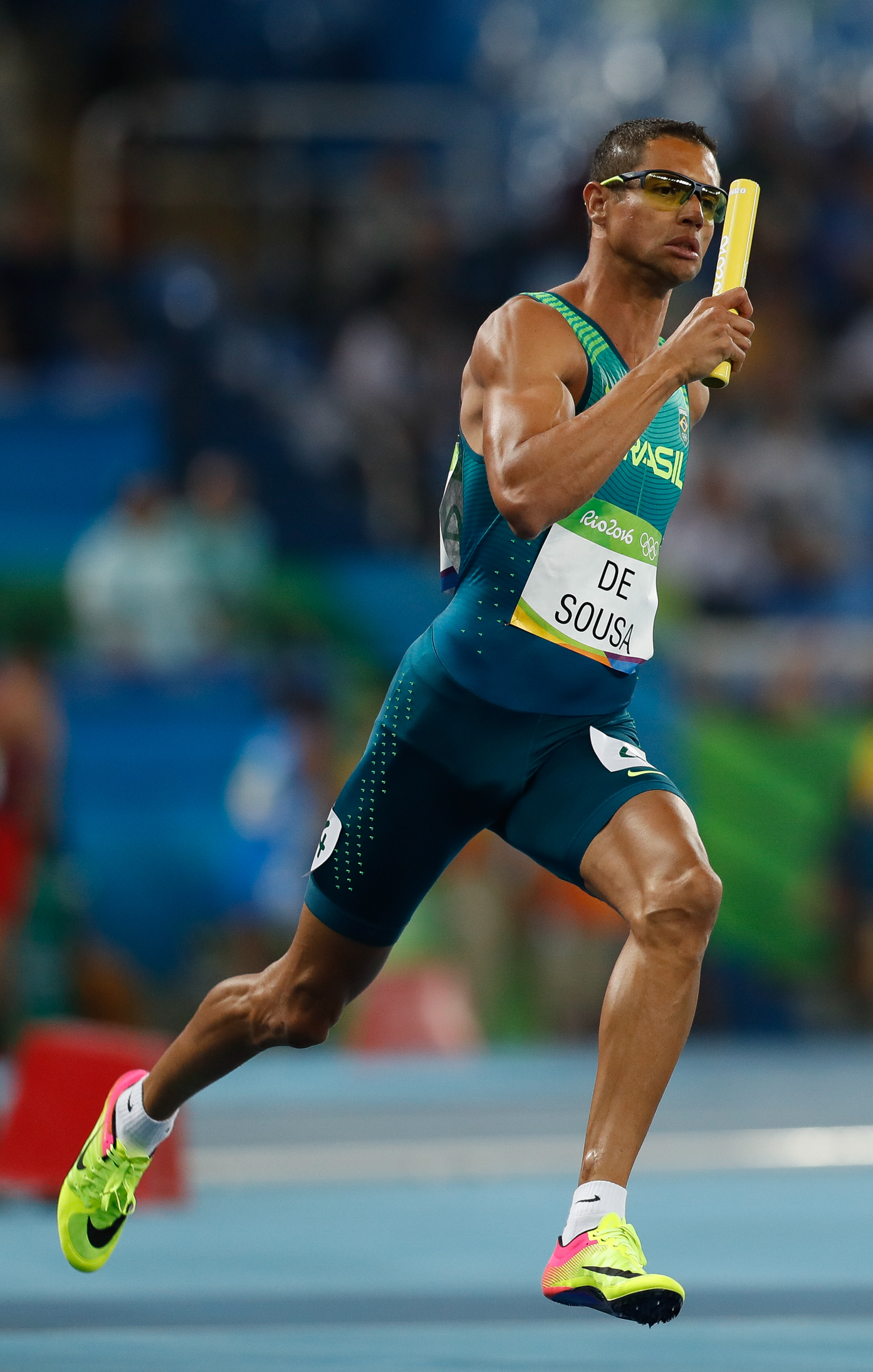
- De Sousa at the 2016 Olympics

Personal information
- Born: 5 March 1987 (age 39)
- Height: 1.87 m (6 ft 2 in)
- Weight: 73 kg (161 lb)

Sport
- Country: Brazil
- Sport: Track and field
- Event: 400 metres

Hugo Balduino de Sousa (born 5 March 1987) is a Brazilian sprinter specialising in the 400 metres. He represented his country at the 2013 and 2015 World Championships in Athletics.

== International competitions ==
Year	Competition	Venue	Position	Event	Notes
Representing Brazil
2009	South American Championships	Lima, Peru	2nd	200 m	20.92
2013	World Championships	Moscow, Russia	7th	4 × 400 m relay	3:02.19
2014	IAAF World Relays	Nassau, Bahamas	8th (h)	4 × 400 m relay	3:02.78
2014	South American Games	São Paulo, Brazil	2nd	400 m	45.09
2014	South American Games	São Paulo, Brazil	1st	4 × 400 m relay	3:03.94
2015	IAAF World Relays	Nassau, Bahamas	5th	4 × 400 m relay	3:00.96
2015	Pan American Games	Toronto, Canada	7th	400 m	46.07
2015	Pan American Games	Toronto, Canada	5th	4 × 400 m relay	3:01.18
2015	World Championships	Beijing, China	31st (h)	400 m	45.42
2015	World Championships	Beijing, China	12th (h)	4 × 400 m relay	3:01.05
2016	Ibero-American Championships	Rio de Janeiro, Brazil	4th	400 m	45.69
2016	Ibero-American Championships	Rio de Janeiro, Brazil	–	4 × 400 m relay	DQ
2016	Olympic Games	Rio de Janeiro, Brazil	8th	4 × 400 m relay	3:03.28
2017	IAAF World Relays	Nassau, Bahamas	7th	4 × 400 m relay	3:05.96
2017	South American Championships	Asunción, Paraguay	2nd	4 × 400 m relay	3:07.32
2017	World Championships	London, United Kingdom	13th (h)	4 × 400 m relay	3:04.02

== Personal bests ==
Outdoor

- 200 metres – 20.68 (+1.1 m/s, Rio de Janeiro 2009)
- 400 metres – 45.09 (Santiago de Chile 2014)
