= Renny Quow =

Trinidad and Tobago sprinter

Personal information
- Born: 25 August 1987 (age 38) Tobago
- Height: 1.74 m (5 ft 9 in)
- Weight: 69 kg (152 lb)

Sport
- Country: Trinidad and Tobago
- Sport: Athletics
- Event: 400m
Medal record
World Championships
Gold medal – first place	2017 London	4 × 400 m relay
Silver medal – second place	2015 Beijing	4 × 400 m relay
Bronze medal – third place	2009 Berlin	400 m
World Indoor Championships
Bronze medal – third place	2012 Istanbul	4 × 400 m relay
World Relays
Bronze medal – third place	2014 Bahamas	4 × 400 m relay
Commonwealth Games
Bronze medal – third place	2014 Glasgow	4 × 400 m relay
Pan American Games
Gold medal – first place	2015 Toronto	4 × 400 m relay
CAC Championships
Gold medal – first place	2008 Cali	400 m
Gold medal – first place	2011 Mayagüez	400 m
Gold medal – first place	2013 Morelia	4 × 400 m relay
Silver medal – second place	2011 Mayagüez	4 × 400 m relay
Bronze medal – third place	2008 Cali	4 × 400 m relay
World Junior Championships
Gold medal – first place	2006 Beijing	400 m
CAC Junior Championships (U20)
Gold medal – first place	2004 Coatzacoalcos	400 m
Gold medal – first place	2006 Port of Spain	400 m
Silver medal – second place	2006 Port of Spain	4 × 400 m relay
CARIFTA Games Junior (U20)
Gold medal – first place	2006 Les Abymes	400 m
Gold medal – first place	2005 Bacolet	400 m
Silver medal – second place	2004 Hamilton	4 × 400 m relay
Silver medal – second place	2005 Bacolet	4 × 400 m relay
Bronze medal – third place	2006 Les Abymes	4 × 400 m relay
CARIFTA Games Youth (U17)
Silver medal – second place	2003 Port of Spain	400 m

Renny Quow (born 25 August 1987) is a Trinidad and Tobago track and field sprinter who specializes in the 400 metres and has made it to both the Olympic and World Finals in the event, a rare feat for athletes from the Caribbean in the 400m. He competes professionally for Adidas. He was born in Tobago. Quow remains the only quarter miler from Trinidad and Tobago to make it to every major 400m finals (Olympics/Worlds/World Jrs/CAC/CARIFTA/Commonwealth Games).

Quow attended South Plains College in Levelland, Texas before turning Professional, becoming the most successful quarter miler in the college's history. His personal best time is 44.53 seconds, achieved at the 2009 World Championships in Athletics in Berlin. Renny Quow has medalled in every major junior/senior championships outside the Olympic Games making him the most decorated 400m runner to come out of Trinidad and Tobago.

== Achievements ==
Year	Competition	Venue	Position	Event	Notes
Representing Trinidad and Tobago
2003	CARIFTA Games (U17)	Port of Spain, Trinidad and Tobago	2nd	400 m	48.97
2003	CARIFTA Games (U17)	Port of Spain, Trinidad and Tobago	4th	4 × 400 m relay	3:21.77
2004	CARIFTA Games (U20)	Hamilton, Bermuda	5th	400 m	48.03
2004	CARIFTA Games (U20)	Hamilton, Bermuda	2nd	4 × 400 m relay	3:12.65
2004	Central American and Caribbean; Junior Championships (U-20)	Coatzacoalcos, Mexico	1st	400 m	47.62
2004	World Junior Championships	Grosseto, Italy	12th (h)	400m	47.19
2004	World Junior Championships	Grosseto, Italy	11th (h)	4 × 400m relay	3:11.33
2005	CARIFTA Games (U20)	Bacolet, Trinidad and Tobago	1st	400 m	46.61
2005	CARIFTA Games (U20)	Bacolet, Trinidad and Tobago	2nd	4 × 400 m relay	3:10.32
2006	CARIFTA Games (U20)	Les Abymes, Guadeloupe	1st	400 m	46.55
2006	CARIFTA Games (U20)	Les Abymes, Guadeloupe	3rd	4 × 400 m relay	3:08.99
2006	Central American and Caribbean Games	Cartagena, Colombia	7th (sf)	400 m	46.30
2006	Central American and Caribbean Games	Cartagena, Colombia	2nd	4 × 400 m relay	3:02.65
2006	Central American and Caribbean; Junior Championships (U-20)	Port of Spain, Trinidad and Tobago	1st	400 m	46.14
2006	Central American and Caribbean; Junior Championships (U-20)	Port of Spain, Trinidad and Tobago	2nd	4 × 400 m relay	3:07.51
2006	World Junior Championships	Beijing, China	1st	400 m	45.74
2006	World Junior Championships	Beijing, China	9th (h)	4 × 400 m relay	3:08.27
2008	Central American and Caribbean Championships	Cali, Colombia	1st	400 m	45.27
2008	Central American and Caribbean Championships	Cali, Colombia	3rd	4 × 400 m relay	3:04.12
2009	World Championships	Berlin, Germany	3rd	400 m	45.02
2011	Central American and Caribbean Championships	Mayagüez, Puerto Rico	1st	400 m	45.44
2011	Central American and Caribbean Championships	Mayagüez, Puerto Rico	2nd	4 × 400 m relay	3:01.65
2011	World Championships	Daegu, South Korea	13th (sf)	400 m	45.72
2011	World Championships	Daegu, South Korea	12th (h)	4 × 400 m relay	3:02.47
2012	World Indoor Championships	Istanbul, Turkey	3rd	4 × 400 m relay	3:06.85
2013	Central American and Caribbean Championships	Morelia, Mexico	–	400 m	DNF
2013	Central American and Caribbean Championships	Morelia, Mexico	1st	4 × 400 m relay	3:02.19
2013	World Championships	Moscow, Russia	6th	4 × 400 m relay	3:01.74
2014	Commonwealth Games	Glasgow, United Kingdom	6th (sf)	400 m	45.47
2014	Commonwealth Games	Glasgow, United Kingdom	3rd	4 × 400 m relay	3:01.51
2015	IAAF World Relays	Nassau, Bahamas	7th	4 × 400 m relay	3:03.10
2015	World Championships	Beijing, China	16th (sf)	400 m	44.98
2015	World Championships	Beijing, China	2nd	4 × 400 m relay	2:58.20
2017	IAAF World Relays	Nassau, Bahamas	4th	4 × 400 m relay	3:03.17
2017	World Championships	London, United Kingdom	32nd (h)	400 m	45.95
2018	World Indoor Championships	Birmingham, United Kingdom	5th (h)	4 × 400 m relay	3:05.96
2018	Commonwealth Games	Gold Coast, Australia	19th (sf)	400 m	47.21
2018	Commonwealth Games	Gold Coast, Australia	4th	4 × 400 m relay	3:02.85
2023	Central American and Caribbean Games	San Salvador, El Salvador	1st	4 × 400 m relay	3:01.99
2023	World Championships	Budapest, Hungary	14th (h)	4 × 400 m relay	3:01.54
2024	Olympic Games	Paris, France	15th (h)	4 × 400 m relay	3:06.73
