= George Caddick =

English footballer

Personal information
- Full name: George Frederick Redvers Caddick
- Date of birth: 2 March 1900
- Place of birth: Liverpool, England
- Date of death: 1984 (aged 83–84)
- Position: Half-back

Senior career*
Years	Team	Apps	(Gls)
1924–1925	Everton	0	(0)
1925–1926	Stockport County	11	(1)
1926–1932	Barnsley	169	(0)
1932	Llanelly		
Total		180	(1)
- * Club domestic league appearances and goals

George Frederick Redvers Caddick (2 March 1900 – 1984) was an English footballer who played in the Football League for Barnsley and Stockport County.
