= Marcus Chambers =

American sprinter

Personal information
- Born: 3 November 1994 (age 31) Tacoma, Washington, U.S.
- Height: 5 ft 10 in (178 cm)
- Weight: 151 lb (68 kg)

Sport
- Country: United States
- Sport: Athletics
- Event: Sprinting
Medal record
Pan American Games
Bronze medal – third place	2015 Toronto	4 x 400 m

Marcus Chambers (born November 3, 1994) is an American athlete who specializes in sprinting.

Born and raised in Tacoma, Washington, Chambers attended Foss High School.

Chambers, contracted by Nike, competes best as a 400 meters runner and has a fastest time of 44.92 seconds. In 2013 he won gold at the Pan American Junior Championships as a member of the 4 x 400 metres relay team. Receiving an athletics scholarship to the University of Oregon, Chambers was a two-time Pac-12 champion in the 400 meters and had a second-place finish in the 400 meters at the 2015 NCAA Outdoor Championships. He was on the gold medal-winning 4 x 400 metres relay team at the 2015 NACAC Championships which set a competition record time.
