= Vaughn Telemaque =

American football player (born 1990)

No. 7
- Position: Safety

Personal information
- Born: March 4, 1990 (age 36); Long Beach, California
- Listed height: 6 ft 1 in (1.85 m)
- Listed weight: 185 lb (84 kg)

Career information
- High school: Long Beach (CA) Poly
- College: Miami (FL)
- NFL draft: 2013: undrafted

Vaughn Telemaque (born March 4, 1990) is an American former football safety. He is a graduate of the University of Miami.

== Early life ==
As a senior in 2007, Telemaque made 89 tackles and nine interceptions, two sacks, forced four fumbles and returned a fumble for a touchdown. In his team's Division I championship victory he had 110 tackles and three interceptions. As a junior in 2006, Telemaque made 52 tackles and two interceptions.

Telemaque was a PrepStar All-American who was ranked as the No. 12 safety and the No. 171 player in the country by Rivals.com. He was rated the No. 6 safety, the No. 12 player in California, and the No. 100 player in the nation by Scout.com. Telemaque was selected as the No. 17 safety by ESPN and was selected to EA Sports second-team All-America.

== College career ==
As a true freshman in 2008, Telemaque played in the first three games of the season against Charleston Southern, Florida, and Texas A&M, before missing the remainder of the season with an injury. Telemaque participated on the scout team for the rest of the season and was awarded a medical hardship to be a redshirt freshman in 2009.

Playing as a redshirt freshman in 2009, Telemaque ranked fifth on the Miami Hurricane defense with 48 total tackles. In the Hurricanes' win over No. 8 Oklahoma, Telemaque recorded career-highs for total tackles (9) and solo stops (6). In the 2009 Champs Sports Bowl against Wisconsin, Telemaque matched a career-high in total tackles (9) and set a career-high in assisted tackles (5).

As a sophomore in 2010, Telemaque was one of seven Canes to start all 13 games on the year and was fourth on team with 58 tackles. He tied for team lead in interceptions with three, including two interceptions against Duke. Telemaque led the team with three fumble recoveries and recorded a season-high seven tackles against both Florida State and Virginia.

For his junior season in 2011, Telemaque Started all 12 games at safety and finished fourth on the team in tackles with 59 (36 solo, 23 assists). He recorded one interception on the year in the season opener against Maryland. Telemaque also registered a season-high eight tackles against the Terrapins and led the team with seven tackles against Florida State and seven tackles against Boston College.

In his senior season in 2012, Telemaque played in 10 games, making two starts. He tallied 20 tackles (10 solo) and one forced fumble and was of six Hurricanes to earn All-ACC honorable mention from league coaches. Telemaque had five tackles in each of season's first two games at Boston College and at Kansas State.
