= William Collazo =

Cuban sprinter (born 1986)

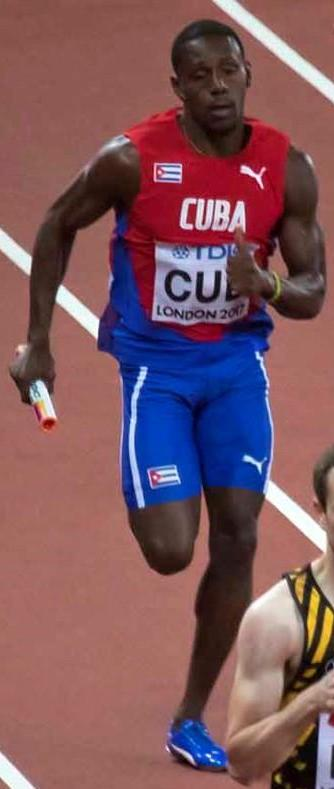

Personal information
- Full name: Williams Collazo Gutiérrez
- Born: August 31, 1986 (age 39) Antilla, Holguín
- Height: 1.72 m (5 ft 8 in)
- Weight: 68 kg (150 lb)

Sport
- Country: Cuba
- Sport: Athletics
- Event: 4 × 400m Relay
Medal record
Representing Cuba
Pan American Games
Gold medal – first place	2011 Guadalajara	4x400m relay
Silver medal – second place	2015 Toronto	4x400m relay
- Updated on 23 December 2014

William Collazo Gutiérrez (born 31 August 1986 in Antilla, Holguín) is a Cuban sprinter who specializes in the 400 metres.

== Career ==
He won a bronze medal in the 4 x 400 metres relay at the 2005 Central American and Caribbean Championships. He also competed at the 2007 World Championships, the 2008 Olympic Games and the 2009 World Championships, but without reaching the final round.

His personal best time is 44.93 seconds, achieved at the World Championships in August 2009 in Berlin. He also has 21.27 seconds in the 200 metres, achieved in March 2004 in Havana.

== Personal best ==
- 200 m: 21.04 s (wind: +0.7 m/s) – (Cuba) La Habana, 23 May 2010
- 400 m: 44.93 s – (Germany) Berlin, 19 August 2009
- 400 m (indoor): 46.31 s – (Qatar) Doha, 13 March 2010

== International competitions ==
Year	Competition	Venue	Position	Event	Notes
Representing Cuba
2005	ALBA Games	Havana, Cuba	4th	200 m	21.49 s (0.0 m/s)
2005	ALBA Games	Havana, Cuba	1st	400 m	47.16 s
2005	ALBA Games	Havana, Cuba	1st	4 × 400 m	3:08.14 min
2005	Central American and Caribbean Championships	Nassau, Bahamas	8th	400 m	46.58 s
2005	Central American and Caribbean Championships	Nassau, Bahamas	3rd	4 × 400 m	3:02.33 min
2006	NACAC Under-23 Championships	Santo Domingo, Dominican Republic	3rd	400 m	45.72 s
2006	Central American and Caribbean Games	Cartagena, Colombia	7th	400 m	46.95 s
2006	Central American and Caribbean Games	Cartagena, Colombia	6th (h)	4 × 400 m	3:08.71 min
2007	ALBA Games	Caracas, Venezuela	1st	400 m	45.68 s
2007	ALBA Games	Caracas, Venezuela	1st	4 × 400 m	3:06.84 min
2007	Pan American Games	Rio de Janeiro, Brazil	4th	400 m	45.45 s
2007	Pan American Games	Rio de Janeiro, Brazil	– (h)	4 × 400 m	DQ
2007	World Championships	Osaka, Japan	19th (sf)	400 m	45.54 s
2008	Ibero-American Championships	Iquique, Chile	1st	4 × 400 m	3:03.22 min
2008	Central American and Caribbean Championships	Cali, Colombia	4th	400 m	46.04 s
2008	Central American and Caribbean Championships	Cali, Colombia	1st	4 × 400 m	3:02.10 min
2008	Olympic Games	Beijing, China	13th (sf)	400 m	45.06 s
2008	Olympic Games	Beijing, China	10th (h)	4 × 400 m	3:02.24 min
2009	ALBA Games	Havana, Cuba	1st	400 m	45.74 s
2009	Central American and Caribbean Championships	Havana, Cuba	1st	400 m	44.96 s
2009	Central American and Caribbean Championships	Havana, Cuba	1st	4 × 400 m	3:03.26 min
2009	World Championships	Berlin, Germany	7th (sf)	400 m	44.93 s
2010	World Indoor Championships	Doha, Qatar	2nd	400 m	46.31 s
2010	Ibero-American Championships	San Fernando, Spain	2nd	400 m	45.33 s
2010	Ibero-American Championships	San Fernando, Spain	1st	4 × 400 m	3:04.86 min
2011	World Championships	Daegu, South Korea	21st (sf)	400 m	46.13 s
2011	Pan American Games	Guadalajara, Mexico	4th	400 m	45.33 s
2011	Pan American Games	Guadalajara, Mexico	1st	4 × 400 m	2:59.43 min
2012	Ibero-American Championships	Barquisimeto, Venezuela	2nd	400 m	45.81 s
2012	Ibero-American Championships	Barquisimeto, Venezuela	1st	4 × 400 m	3:00.43 min
2012	Olympic Games	London, United Kingdom	3rd (h)^{1}	4 × 400 m	3:00.55 min
2014	World Relays	Nassau, Bahamas	5th	4 × 400 m	3:00.61 min
2014	Central American and Caribbean Games	Xalapa, Mexico	1st	4 × 400 m	3:00.70 min A
2015	IAAF World Relays	Nassau, Bahamas	10th	4 × 400 m	3:03.73 min
2015	NACAC Championships	San José, Costa Rica	4th (sf)	400m	46.30 s
2015	NACAC Championships	San José, Costa Rica	3rd	4 × 400 m	3:01.22 min
2015	World Championships	Beijing, China	7th	4 × 400 m	3:03.05 min
2016	Ibero-American Championships	Rio de Janeiro, Brazil	7th	400 m	45.92 s
2016	Ibero-American Championships	Rio de Janeiro, Brazil	–	4 × 400 m	DQ
2016	Olympic Games	Rio de Janeiro, Brazil	6th	4 × 400 m	2:59.53 min
2017	IAAF World Relays	Nassau, Bahamas	5th	4 × 400 m	3:03.60 min
2017	World Championships	London, United Kingdom	6th	4 × 400 m	3:01.10 min

^{1}: Did not finish in the final.
