= LaToy Williams =

Bahamian sprinter

Personal information
- Born: 28 May 1988 (age 38) Freeport, Bahamas

Sport
- Sport: Track and field
- Event: 400 metres
Medal record
Representing Bahamas
Commonwealth Games
Silver medal – second place	2014 Glasgow	4 × 400 m relay
World Relay Championships
Silver medal – second place	2014 Nassau	4×400 m relay
NACAC Championships
Silver medal – second place	2015 Costa Rica	4×400m relay
CAC Championships
Gold medal – first place	2011 Mayagüez	4×400 m relay
Silver medal – second place	2013 Morelia	4×400 m relay
NACAC U-23 Championships
Silver medal – second place	2010 Miramar	4 × 400 meters

LaToy Williams (born 28 May 1988) is a Bahamian retired sprinter mainly competed in the 400m. He was part of the 4 × 400 m relay team at the 2009 and 2011 IAAF World Championships in Athletics.

== Career ==
He retired in 2017 and since became a family life teacher at Bishop Michael Eldon School Williams competed in collegiate track at South Plains College and Texas Tech University

== Personal bests ==
Event	Time	Venue	Date
400 m	44.73	Hutchinson, KS	May 2009
400 m	46.84 (indoor)	Lubbock, Texas	January 2010
