= Yoandys Lescay =

Cuban sprinter (born 1994)

Personal information
- Full name: Yoandys Alberto Lescay Pardo
- Nationality: Cuba
- Born: 5 January 1994 (age 32) Las Tunas, Cuba
- Height: 1.81 m (5 ft 11 1/2 in)
- Weight: 77 kg (170 lb)

Sport
- Sport: Athletics
- Event: Sprints

Achievements and titles
- Personal bests: 200 m: 20.87 (San Salvador 2012); 400 m: 45.13 (San José, Costa Rica 2015)
Medal record
Men's athletics
Representing CUB
CAC Junior Championships (Junior)
Gold medal – first place	2012 San Salvador	200 m
Gold medal – first place	2012 San Salvador	400 m
Universiade
Silver medal – second place	2017 Taipei	400 m
- Updated on 15 December 2014

Yoandys Alberto Lescay Pardo (born 5 January 1994) is a Cuban sprinter.

He reached the semi-finals in the 200 metres at the 2012 World Junior Championships in Athletics in Barcelona.

== Personal bests ==
- 200 m: 20.83 s (wind: +0.5 m/s) – Havana, Cuba, 19 March 2014
- 400 m: 45.00 s – Rio de Janeiro, Brazil, 13 August 2015

== International competitions ==
Year	Competition	Venue	Position	Event	Notes
Representing Cuba
2012	Central American and Caribbean; Junior Championships (U20)	San Salvador, El Salvador	1st	200m	20.87 (-1.2 m/s)
2012	Central American and Caribbean; Junior Championships (U20)	San Salvador, El Salvador	1st	400m	46.17
2012	World Junior Championships	Barcelona, Spain	14th (sf)	200m	21.27 (-4.5 m/s)
2013	Central American and Caribbean Championships	Morelia, Mexico	4th	4 × 400 m relay	3:03.17 A
2013	World Championships	Moscow, Russia	–	400m	DQ
2013	World Championships	Moscow, Russia	17th (h)	4 × 400 m relay	3:04.26
2013	Pan American Junior Championships	Medellín, Colombia	2nd	400m	45.90 A
2014	IAAF World Relays	Nassau, Bahamas	5th	4 × 400 m relay	3:00.61
2014	Pan American Sports Festival	Mexico City, Mexico	3rd	400m	45.54 A
2014	Central American and Caribbean Games	Xalapa, Mexico	2nd	400m	45.56 A
2014	Central American and Caribbean Games	Xalapa, Mexico	1st	4 × 400 m relay	3:00.70 A
2015	IAAF World Relays	Nassau, Bahamas	10th	4 × 400 m relay	3:03.73
2015	NACAC Championships	San José, Costa Rica	4th	400m	45.62
2015	NACAC Championships	San José, Costa Rica	3rd	4 × 400 m relay	3:01.22
2015	World Championships	Beijing, China	7th	4 × 400 m relay	3:03.05
2016	Ibero-American Championships	Rio de Janeiro, Brazil	1st	400 m	45.36
2016	Ibero-American Championships	Rio de Janeiro, Brazil	–	4 × 400 m relay	DQ
2016	Olympic Games	Rio de Janeiro, Brazil	13th (sf)	400 m	45.00
2016	Olympic Games	Rio de Janeiro, Brazil	6th	4 × 400 m relay	2:59.53
2017	IAAF World Relays	Nassau, Bahamas	5th	4 × 400 m relay	3:03.60
2017	World Championships	London, United Kingdom	31st (h)	400 m	45.93
2017	World Championships	London, United Kingdom	6th	4 × 400 m relay	3:01.10
2017	Universiade	Taipei, Taiwan	2nd	400 m	45.31
2018	Central American and Caribbean Games	Barranquilla, Colombia	2nd	400 m	45.38
2018	Central American and Caribbean Games	Barranquilla, Colombia	1st	4 × 400 m relay	3:03.87
2018	NACAC Championships	Toronto, Canada	5th	400 m	46.21
2018	NACAC Championships	Toronto, Canada	3rd	4 × 400 m relay	3:04.11
2019	Pan American Games	Lima, Peru	10th (h)	400 m	46.60
2019	Pan American Games	Lima, Peru	5th	4 × 400 m relay	3:05.87
2023	ALBA Games	Caracas, Venezuela	3rd	200 m	21.21
2023	ALBA Games	Caracas, Venezuela	4th	400 m	47.71
2023	Central American and Caribbean Games	San Salvador, El Salvador	16th (h)	400 m	51.38
