= Machel Cedenio =

Trinidad and Tobago sprinter

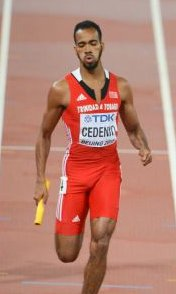

Personal information
- Nationality: Trinidadian
- Born: 6 September 1995 (age 31) Point Fortin, Trinidad
- Height: 1.92 m (6 ft 4 in)
- Weight: 75 kg (165 lb)

Sport
- Sport: Running
- Events: 200 metres, 400 metres

Achievements and titles
- Personal bests: 200 m: 21.15 (Port of Spain 2011); 400 m: 44.01 (Rio de Janeiro 2016)
Medal record
Men's athletics
Representing Trinidad and Tobago
World Championships
Gold medal – first place	2017 London	4 × 400 m relay
Silver medal – second place	2015 Beijing	4 × 400 m relay
World Relays
Gold medal – first place	2019 Yokohama	4 × 400 m relay
Pan American Games
Gold medal – first place	2015 Toronto	4 × 400 m relay
Silver medal – second place	2015 Toronto	400 m
Bronze medal – third place	2019 Lima	4 × 400 m relay
World Junior Championships
Gold medal – first place	2014 Oregon	400 m
CAC Championships
Gold medal – first place	2013 Morelia	4 × 400 m relay
Pan American Junior Championships
Silver medal – second place	2011 Miramar	4 × 400 m relay
CARIFTA Games (Junior)
Silver medal – second place	2012 Hamilton	400 m
Silver medal – second place	2012 Hamilton	4 × 400 m relay
CAC Junior Championships (Youth)
Silver medal – second place	2010 Santo Domingo	400 m
Silver medal – second place	2010 Santo Domingo	4 × 400 m relay
CARIFTA Games (Youth)
Gold medal – first place	2010 George Town	4 × 400 m relay
Gold medal – first place	2011 Montego Bay	200 m
Gold medal – first place	2011 Montego Bay	400 m
Silver medal – second place	2011 Montego Bay	4 × 100 m relay
Silver medal – second place	2011 Montego Bay	4 × 400 m relay

Machel Cedenio (born 6 September 1995) is a Trinidadian sprinter specialising in the 400 metres. He represented his country at two outdoor and one indoor World Championships winning a silver medal in the relay at the 2015 outdoor edition. He competed at the 2016 Summer Olympics. He qualified for the final and came fourth with a new personal best of 44.01 seconds. At the time, this was the fastest fourth place time for the 400 metres.

== International competitions ==
Year	Competition	Venue	Position	Event	Notes
Representing Trinidad and Tobago
2010	CARIFTA Games (U17)	George Town, Cayman Islands	1st	4 × 400 m	3:16.30
2010	Central American and Caribbean; Junior Championships (U18)	Santo Domingo, Dom. Rep.	2nd	400 m	48.12
2010	Central American and Caribbean; Junior Championships (U18)	Santo Domingo, Dom. Rep.	2nd	4 × 400 m	3:17.54
2011	CARIFTA Games (U17)	Montego Bay, Jamaica	1st	200 m	21.43
2011	CARIFTA Games (U17)	Montego Bay, Jamaica	1st	400 m	47.38
2011	CARIFTA Games (U17)	Montego Bay, Jamaica	2nd	4 × 100 m	41.13
2011	CARIFTA Games (U17)	Montego Bay, Jamaica	2nd	4 × 400 m	3:15.35
2011	World Youth Championships	Lille, France	4th	400 m	46.89
2011	World Youth Championships	Lille, France	6th	Medley relay	1:52.77
2011	Pan American Junior Championships	Miramar, United States	13th (h)	400 m	50.55
2011	Pan American Junior Championships	Miramar, United States	2nd	4 × 400 m	3:13.27
2012	CARIFTA Games (U20)	Hamilton, Bermuda	2nd	400 m	47.93
2012	CARIFTA Games (U20)	Hamilton, Bermuda	2nd	4 × 400 m	3:11.62
2012	Central American and Caribbean; Junior Championships (U18)	San Salvador, El Salvador	1st	400 m	47.36
2012	Central American and Caribbean; Junior Championships (U18)	San Salvador, El Salvador	1st	4 × 400 m	3:11.66
2012	World Junior Championships	Barcelona, Spain	5th	400 m	46.17
2012	World Junior Championships	Barcelona, Spain	3rd	4 × 400 m	3:06.32
2013	CARIFTA Games (U20)	Nassau, Bahamas	1st	400 m	45.93
2013	CARIFTA Games (U20)	Nassau, Bahamas	2nd	4 × 400 m	3:06.23
2013	Central American and Caribbean Championships	Morelia, Mexico	1st	4 × 400 m	3:02.19
2014	IAAF World Relays	Nassau, Bahamas	3rd	4 × 400 m	2:58.34
2014	CARIFTA Games (U20)	Fort-de-France, Martinique	1st	400 m	45.95
2014	CARIFTA Games (U20)	Fort-de-France, Martinique	1st	4 × 400 m	3:06.02
2014	Central American and Caribbean; Junior Championships (U20)	Morelia, Mexico	1st	400 m	45.28
2014	World Junior Championships	Eugene, United States	1st	400 m	45.13
2014	World Junior Championships	Eugene, United States	16th (h)	4 × 400 m	3:12.06
2015	IAAF World Relays	Nassau, Bahamas	7th	4 × 400 m	3:03.10
2015	Pan American Games	Toronto, Canada	2nd	400 m	44.70
2015	Pan American Games	Toronto, Canada	1st	4 × 400 m	2:59.60
2015	World Championships	Beijing, China	7th	400 m	45.06
2015	World Championships	Beijing, China	2nd	4 × 400 m	2:58.20
2016	World Indoor Championships	Portland, United States	5th (h)	4 × 400 m	3:07.83
2016	Olympic Games	Rio de Janeiro, Brazil	4th	400 m	44.01
2016	Olympic Games	Rio de Janeiro, Brazil	–	4 × 400 m	DQ
2017	World Championships	London, United Kingdom	21st (sf)	400 m	45.91
2017	World Championships	London, United Kingdom	1st	4 × 400 m	2.58.12
2018	World Indoor Championships	Birmingham, United Kingdom	5th (h)	4 × 400 m	3:05.96
2018	Commonwealth Games	Gold Coast, Australia	11th (sf)	400 m	46.19
2018	Commonwealth Games	Gold Coast, Australia	4th	4 × 400 m	3:02.85
2019	World Relays	Yokohama, Japan	1st	4 × 400 m	3:00.81
2019	Pan American Games	Lima, Peru	12th (h)	400 m	46.77
2019	Pan American Games	Lima, Peru	3rd	4 × 400 m	3:02.25
2019	World Championships	Doha, Qatar	7th	400 m	45.30
2019	World Championships	Doha, Qatar	5th	4 × 400 m	3:00.74
2021	Olympic Games	Tokyo, Japan	21st (sf)	400 m	45.86
2021	Olympic Games	Tokyo, Japan	8th	4 × 400 m	3:00.85
2023	Central American and Caribbean Games	San Salvador, El Salvador	1st	4 × 400 m	3:01.99
