= Jarrin Solomon =

Trinidad and Tobago sprinter

Personal information
- Born: January 11, 1986 (age 40) Trinidad And Tobago
- Height: 1.65 m (5 ft 5 in)
- Weight: 73 kg (161 lb)

Sport
- Country: Trinidad and Tobago
- Sport: Athletics
- Event: 400 metres
Medal record
Olympic Games
Bronze medal – third place	2012 London	4 × 400 m relay
World Championships
Gold medal – first place	2017 London	4 × 400 m relay
Silver medal – second place	2015 Beijing	4 × 400 m relay
World Indoor Championships
Bronze medal – third place	2012 Istanbul	4 × 400 m relay
Bronze medal – third place	2016 Portland	4 × 400 m relay
CAC Championships
Gold medal – first place	2013 Morelia	400 m
Gold medal – first place	2013 Morelia	4 × 400 m relay
Commonwealth Games
Bronze medal – third place	2014 Glasgow	4 × 400 m relay
Pan American Games
Gold medal – first place	2015 Toronto	4 × 400 m relay
World Relays
Bronze medal – third place	2014 Bahamas	4 × 400 m relay

Jarrin Solomon (born 11 January 1986) is a Trinidadian track and field sprinter who specializes in the 400 metres. He was part of the Trinidad and Tobago team that won the bronze medal in the 4 × 400 m relay at the 2012 IAAF World Indoor Championships. Solomon also competed in the 2012 Summer Olympics, where his 4 × 400 m team again won the bronze medal. He was also part of Trinidad and Tobago's 2014 Commonwealth Games 4 × 400 team, where they also won a bronze.

His personal best on the 400 m track is 44.98 s, set in 2014.

Solomon is a native of Albuquerque, New Mexico, United States, where he attended La Cueva High School and the University of New Mexico. His father, Mike Solomon, is from Trinidad and was also a 400 m sprinter.

In the summer of 2018, Solomon was a "flex" player for Godspeed, a flag football team made mostly of former professional American football players that participated in the American Flag Football League (AFFL). The team were crowned the champions of participating pro teams but lost in the final match to the amateur champion team.
