= Osmaidel Pellicier =

Cuban sprinter

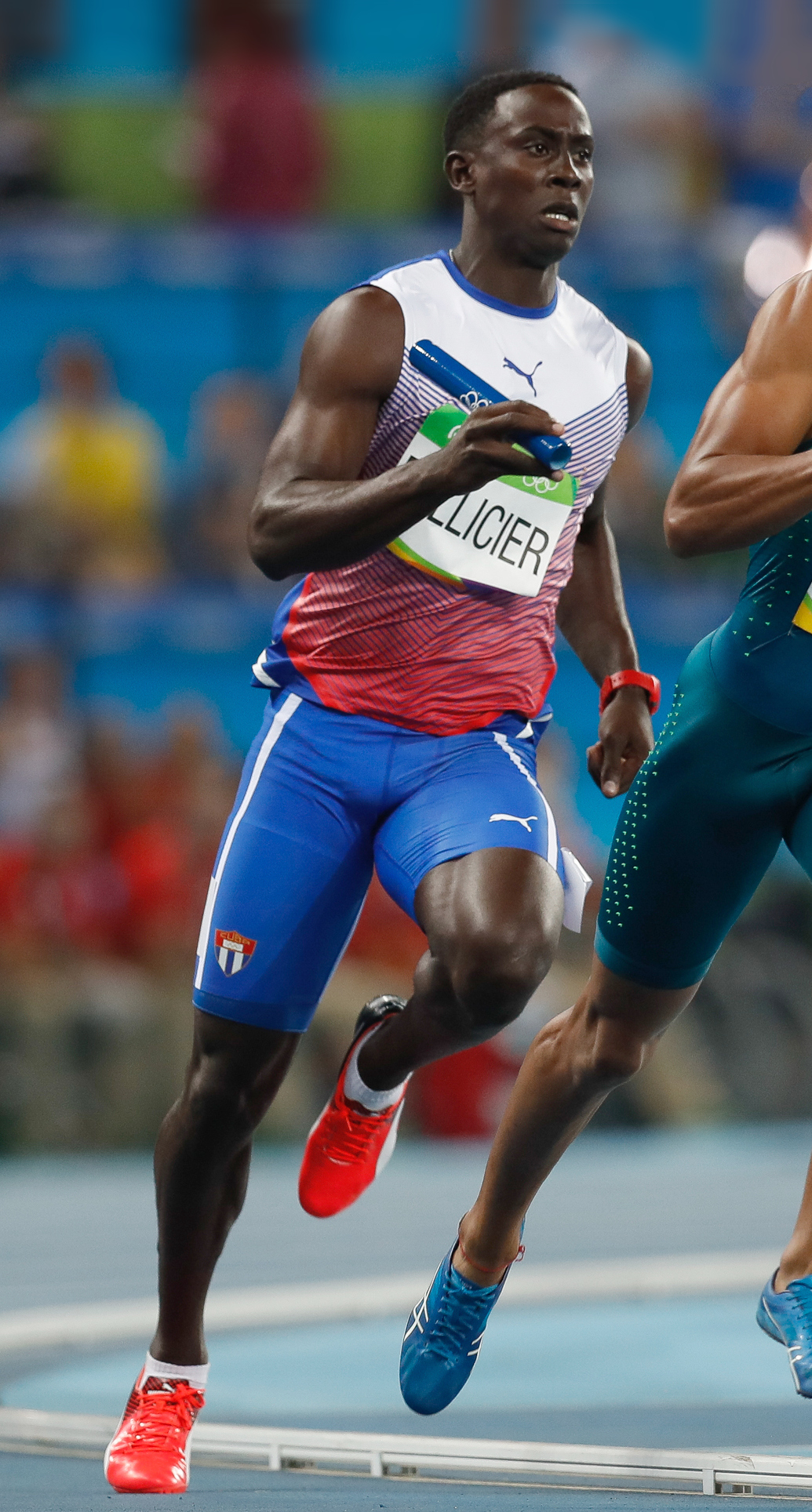
- Pellicier at the 2016 Olympics

Personal information
- Born: 30 March 1992 (age 34) Santiago de Cuba, Cuba
- Height: 1.88 m (6 ft 2 in)
- Weight: 88 kg (194 lb)

Sport
- Sport: Athletics
- Event: 400 m

Achievements and titles
- Personal best: 400 m – 45.92 (2015)
Medal record
Representing Cuba
Pan American Games
| Silver medal – second place | 2015 Toronto | 4x400m relay |
Central American and Caribbean Games
| Gold medal – first place | 2014 Veracruz | 4x400m relay |

Osmaidel Pellicier (born 30 March 1992) is a sprinter from Cuba. He competed in the 4 × 400 m relay at the 2016 Summer Olympics.
