= Javere Bell =

Jamaican sprinter

Personal information
- Nationality: Jamaican
- Born: 20 September 1992 (age 33)

Sport
- Sport: Track and field
- Event: 400m
Medal record
Men's athletics
Representing Jamaica
World Championships
Silver medal – second place	2013 Moscow	4×400 m relay

Javere Bell (born 20 September 1992) is a Jamaican sprinter. He competed in the 4x400 metres relay event at the 2013 World Championships in Athletics, winning a silver medal.
