= Daniel Harper (athlete) =

Canadian sprinter (born 1989)

Personal information
- Nationality: Canada
- Born: 28 August 1989 (age 36) Mississauga, Ontario
- Height: 1.84 m (6 ft 0 in)
- Weight: 75 kg (165 lb)

Sport
- Sport: Running
- Event: 400 metres
- Club: Brampton Track Club

Achievements and titles
- Personal best: 400 m: 45.60 (Lubbock 2012)
Medal record
Representing Canada
Summer Universiade
Bronze medal – third place	2009 Belgrade	400 metres

Tyler Daniel Harper (born August 28, 1989) is a Canadian track and field athlete competing in the 400 metres. He came in third in the 2012 Canadian National Championships in Calgary, earning an Olympic "B" standard. He finished 7th at the 2008 IAAF World Junior Championships in Bydgoszcz, Poland. His personal best time is 45.60 seconds, achieved May 5, 2012 in Lubbock, Texas.
