= Quincy Watts =

American athlete (born 1970)

Personal information
- Born: June 19, 1970 (age 56) Detroit, Michigan, U.S.
- Height: 6 ft 3 in (1.91 m)
- Weight: 195 lb (88 kg)

Sport
- Sport: Running
- Events: 100 m, 200 m, 400 m
- College team: USC Trojans
Medal record
Men's athletics
Representing the United States
Olympic Games
Gold medal – first place	1992 Barcelona	400 metres
Gold medal – first place	1992 Barcelona	4 × 400 m relay
World Championships
Gold medal – first place	1993 Stuttgart	4 × 400 m relay
Silver medal – second place	1991 Tokyo	4 × 400 m relay

Quincy D. Watts (born June 19, 1970) is an American former athlete, and two-time gold medalist at the 1992 Summer Olympics.

== Career ==
Born in Detroit, Michigan, Quincy Watts attended the University of Southern California (USC) where he excelled as a general athlete and a wide receiver on the college football team. He took up track at Sutter Middle School and later went to Taft High School in Woodland Hills, California, a neighborhood in Los Angeles. In 1987, he ran a 10.36s 100 m, which stands as the Los Angeles city section record, and at the time was the second fastest in CIF history, behind only Henry Thomas' 10.25 in 1985. That same year he repeated as the 200 meters Champion at the CIF California State Championships in Sacramento.

Watts began as a short sprinter, specializing for 100 m and 200 m, but the USC coach Jim Bush, convinced him to run 400 m, where he found his success.

In 1992, by far his most successful year, he won the gold medal in the Olympic 400 m. He twice broke Lee Evans' Olympic record of 43.86, (set at altitude during the 1968 games in Mexico), clocking 43.71 in his semi-final, before going on to record 43.50 in the final. As of August 2024, this is still the track record for Barcelona and the second‑fastest time run in Spain. He was a member of the 4 × 400 m relay team, running the second leg in 43.10, which smashed the then-world record in a time of 2:55.74.

At the World Championships in 1991, Watts won a silver medal in 4 × 400 relay, which he turned to gold in the following championships in 1993 running the second leg on the team that took almost a second and a half off the then-World Record he had been a part of the year before. That race time still stands as the World Record. In the 1993 Individual 400 m Final, where Watts was expecting to challenge the time of his relay teammates Michael Johnson and Butch Reynolds, his custom‑built Nike shoe disintegrated as he was coming off the final turn. Continuing to run, he still managed fourth place. Since this incident, poor Nike shoe quality has been referred to as "doing the Quincy Watts" in track circles. It has also affected Nike's concern for quality control.

In 1994 and 1995, he failed to break 45 seconds and in 1996 finished a disappointing seventh in the US Olympic trials in a time of 45.64. Overshadowed by Michael Johnson, he retired in 1997 and was hired as the head coach at Taft High School. After his tenure at Taft, he worked as an assistant track coach at Harvard-Westlake School. Watts currently serves as an assistant coach for the Men's and Women's sprints teams at the University of Southern California. In addition to his coaching responsibilities, he also trains several professional athletes, including Willie McGinest and Curtis Conway. Notably, Conway was a high school competitor of Watts.

Watts currently holds the position of head coach at USC.
