= Butch Reynolds =

American sprinter (born 1964)

Personal information
- Full name: Harry Lee Reynolds Jr.
- Born: June 8, 1964 (age 62) Akron, Ohio, U.S.
- Education: Ohio State University
Medal record
Men's athletics
Representing the United States
Olympic Games
Gold medal – first place	1988 Seoul	4 × 400 m relay
Silver medal – second place	1988 Seoul	400 m
World Championships
Gold medal – first place	1987 Rome	4 × 400 m relay
Gold medal – first place	1993 Stuttgart	4 × 400 m relay
Gold medal – first place	1995 Gothenburg	4 × 400 m relay
Silver medal – second place	1993 Stuttgart	400 m
Silver medal – second place	1995 Gothenburg	400 m
Bronze medal – third place	1987 Rome	400 m
World Indoor Championships
Gold medal – first place	1993 Toronto	400 m

Harry Lee "Butch" Reynolds Jr. (born June 8, 1964) is an American former track and field athlete who competed in the 400 meter dash. He held the world record for the event for 11 years 9 days with his personal best time of 43.29 seconds set in 1988. That year, he was the silver medalist at the 1988 Seoul Olympics (0.06 seconds behind Steve Lewis) and a relay gold medalist.

Reynolds was falsely accused and banned for drug use for two years by the IAAF until the U.S. Supreme Court ruled in favor of Reynolds due to an apparent drug testing procedural flaw. Reynolds was awarded $27.3 million due to the false accusation damages but he never received the money.

On his competitive return, he became the 1993 World Indoor Champion and won two successive 400 meter silver medals at the World Championships. He also enjoyed success with the 4 × 400 meter relay team, winning the world title three times in his career with the United States (1987, 1993 and 1995). His team's time of 2:54.29 minutes at the 1993 World Championships in Athletics is the current world record. Reynolds remains the third fastest of all time in the 400 m after Michael Johnson and Wayde van Niekerk, the current world and Olympic record holder.

In 2016, he was elected into the National Track and Field Hall of Fame.

== Career ==
Reynolds was born in Akron, Ohio, and attended Archbishop Hoban High School. His brother Jeff Reynolds was also a professional sprinter.

On 17 August 1988, aged 24 years and 70 days, he set a 400-meter world record with 43.29 seconds, smashing Lee Evans's nearly 20-year-old 1968 world record by 0.57 seconds. This record stood for 11 years, 9 days and was broken by Michael Johnson (43.18) in August 1999; Wayde van Niekerk broke Michael Johnson's record in 2016 in a time of 43.03. As of September 2025, over 37 years after running 43.29, in addition to holding the third fastest time ever, he is one of only 8 athletes to run a sub-43.50 race.

He won a silver medal in the 1988 Summer Olympics in the 400 meters and a gold medal in the 4 × 400 m relay. In the IAAF World Championships in Athletics he won a bronze medal in 1987, and silver medals in 1993 and 1995. He also won gold medals on the 4 × 400 meter relays in 1987, 1993 and 1995. The 1993 World Championship team with Andrew Valmon, Watts and Johnson still holds the world record for the relay.

In the 1996 American Olympic trials he finished second behind Michael Johnson, clocking 43.91, the fastest non-winning 400 meters performance until 26 August 2015. However, in the 1996 Summer Olympics semi-final, he suffered a hamstring injury, failed to qualify for the final, and also had to withdraw from the relay team.

He retired after the 1999 season. Reynolds has since established the Butch Reynolds Care for Kids Foundation and was the speed coach for the Ohio State University football team up until his resignation in April 2008. Butch resumed coaching when he was hired as the sprint coach for Ohio Dominican University in Columbus in 2014. His first season as coach led to an improvement of 20 points at the GLIAC Outdoor Meet and the emergence of one of the best young sprinters in the GLIAC. Butch left Ohio Dominican after the 2018 outdoor season.

== Drug suspension ==
Butch Reynolds was suspended for two years by the IAAF for alleged illegal drug use in 1990. This was the start of a long legal fight, after which the United States Supreme Court ordered the United States Olympic Committee to allow him to participate in the 1992 U.S. Olympic trials, after finding the IAAF testing procedures in 1990 were flawed in multiple ways. In addition to evidentiary and scientific deficiencies in the overall testing system, it was proven that the test specimen was specifically not Reynolds'; testers had marked specimen "H6" – belonging to a female East German competitor in a different event – as testing positive, and confirmed that Reynolds' blood specimen was "H5". However, laboratory director Jean-Pierre LaFarge claimed in court that, in spite of the documentation in the laboratory's own records, the technician had told him months later that specimen "H5" was the positive one. Yet "H6" was circled on two separate documents by the technician.

== IAAF and IOC controversy ==
This injunction brought American law and equity into conflict with the rules of International Olympic Committee (IOC) and International Association of Athletics Federations (IAAF), which prohibited suspended athletes from competing. In fact, the IAAF threatened to suspend any athlete that competed against Butch Reynolds. The American Olympic trial 400 meters heats were postponed for four days, but the IAAF finally backed down. Reynolds finished fifth in the trials, and qualified for a place as a substitute on the American 4 × 400 meters relay team. However, the IAAF (which had administered the flawed test) then banned him from competing in the 1992 Olympics.

That same year Reynolds also won a libel suit against the IAAF, and was awarded $27.3 million in damages. The IAAF stated that the ruling, made in Ohio, had no bearing upon the organization and was invalid. A federal appeals panel later overturned the verdict on jurisdictional grounds.

== See also ==
- List of doping cases in athletics
