= 2015 World Youth Championships in Athletics – Boys' 400 metres =

Boys' 400 metres at the 2015 World Youth Championships in Athletics
- Venue: Estadio Olímpico Pascual Guerrero
- Dates: 15–17 July
- Competitors: 48 from 35 nations
- Winning time: 45.27

Medalists
gold medal	Christopher Taylor	Jamaica
silver medal	Josephus Lyles	United States
bronze medal	Keshun Reed	United States

The boys' 400 metres at the 2015 World Youth Championships in Athletics was held at the Estadio Olímpico Pascual Guerrero in Cali, Colombia from 15 to 17 July 2015.

Christopher Taylor of Jamaica won the event. His time of 45.27 seconds was a world age-15 best.

== Records ==
Prior to the competition, the following records were as follows.

World Youth Best	Obea Moore (USA)	45.14	Santiago, Chile	2 September 1995
Championship Record	Kirani James (GRN)	45.24	Bressanone, Italy	10 July 2009
World Youth Leading	Christopher Taylor (JAM)	45.55	Kingston, Jamaica	13 June 2015

== Results ==
=== Round 1 ===
First 3 in each heat (Q) and the next 6 fastest (q) advance to the semifinals.

Rank	Heat	Name	Nationality	Time	Note
1	6	Josephus Lyles	United States	46.26	Q
2	2	Anthony Zambrano	Colombia	46.27	Q, PB
3	2	Christopher Taylor	Jamaica	46.30	Q
4	6	Loïc Prévot	France	46.67	Q, PB
5	5	Keshun Reed	United States	46.98	Q
6	5	Chandan Bauri	India	47.15	Q
7	4	Louis Stenmark	Australia	47.17	Q
8	2	Manato Sasaki	Japan	47.27	Q
9	3	Jamal Walton	Cayman Islands	47.35	Q
10	1	Karabo Sibanda	Botswana	47.46	Q
11	5	Edwin Ngeeti	Kenya	47.47	Q
12	3	Marvin Schlegel	Germany	47.57	Q
13	5	Xu Haoran	China	47.59	q, PB
14	3	Ryota Kitahara	Japan	47.69	Q
15	6	Josphat Kipngetich Ngeno	Kenya	47.72	Q
16	2	Roger Ordaz	Mexico	47.74	q, PB
17	5	Edgar Ramírez	Mexico	47.88	q, PB
18	6	Vladimir Aceti	Italy	47.95	q
19	1	Wu Yuang	China	48.02	Q
20	5	Florian Colon Marti	Germany	48.07	q
21	2	Tymoteusz Zimny	Poland	48.09	q, PB
22	1	Miquel Shepper	Suriname	48.30	Q, PB
23	1	Anthony Carpenter	Jamaica	48.31	
24	3	Nathan Friginette	Canada	48.38	PB
24	2	Bayraktar Berkay Çalık	Turkey	48.38	PB
26	4	André Marich	South Africa	48.41	Q
27	4	Anej Zupanc	Slovenia	48.44	Q, PB
28	5	Florin Gaspar	Romania	48.45	PB
29	4	Manuel Guijarro	Spain	48.54	
29	6	Austris Karpinskis	Latvia	48.54	
29	2	Dlamini Ndzingeko	Eswatini	48.54	PB
32	6	Rudi Pretorius	Namibia	48.55	PB
33	1	Petar Melnjak	Croatia	48.59	
33	3	Taha Hussein Yaseen	Iraq	48.59	
33	5	Nico Garea	Austria	48.59	PB
36	4	Kagiso Moyuthu	Botswana	48.72	PB
37	1	Mihaíl Pappás	Greece	48.85	
38	1	Andrés Hernández	Colombia	49.02	PB
39	3	Rodney Griffin	United States Virgin Islands	49.09	PB
40	6	Nicolae Daroczi	Romania	49.12	
41	2	Álvaro Sierra	Spain	49.30	
42	4	Kristjan Joosep	Estonia	49.34	
43	3	Michaiah Robinson	Bermuda	49.49	
44	4	Michael Aono	Canada	50.18	
45	6	Lou Wai Un	Macau	51.75	PB
46	1	Sebastian Acuña	Ecuador	52.01	
–	3	Christopher Melenciano	Dominican Republic	DQ	
–	4	Luis Charles	Dominican Republic	DQ	

=== Semifinal ===
First 2 in each heat (Q) and the next 2 fastest (q) advance to the final.

Rank	Heat	Name	Nationality	Time	Note
1	1	Christopher Taylor	South Africa	45.30	Q, WYL
2	1	Josephus Lyles	United States	45.93	Q
3	1	Karabo Sibanda	Botswana	46.53	q
4	3	Anthony Zambrano	Colombia	46.76	Q
5	2	Keshun Reed	United States	46.77	Q
6	2	Louis Stenmark	Australia	46.78	Q, PB
7	1	Manato Sasaki	Japan	46.85	q, PB
8	3	Jamal Walton	Cayman Islands	46.97	Q
9	3	Loïc Prévot	France	47.03	
10	2	Chandan Bauri	India	47.41	
11	1	Xu Haoran	China	47.44	PB
12	1	Tymoteusz Zimny	Poland	47.53	PB
13	2	Ryota Kitahara	Japan	47.85	
14	2	Marvin Schlegel	Germany	47.92	
15	3	Wu Yuang	China	48.11	
16	1	André Marich	South Africa	48.34	
17	3	Roger Ordaz	Mexico	48.59	
17	2	Vladimir Aceti	Italy	48.59	
19	3	Florian Colon Marti	Germany	48.84	
20	2	Edgar Ramírez	Mexico	49.01	
21	3	Edwin Ngeeti	Kenya	49.26	
22	2	Josphat Kipngetich Ngeno	Kenya	49.86	
23	1	Anej Zupanc	Slovenia	49.93	
–	3	Miquel Shepper	Suriname	DQ	

=== Final ===
Rank	Name	Nationality	Time	Note
1st place, gold medalist(s)	Christopher Taylor	Jamaica	45.27	WYL
2nd place, silver medalist(s)	Josephus Lyles	United States	45.46	PB
3rd place, bronze medalist(s)	Keshun Reed	United States	45.96	
4	Jamal Walton	Cayman Islands	45.99	PB
5	Karabo Sibanda	Botswana	46.03	PB
6	Louis Stenmark	Australia	46.29	PB
7	Anthony Zambrano	Colombia	46.57	
8	Manato Sasaki	Japan	47.54	
