= 2014 World Junior Championships in Athletics – Men's 400 metres =

The men's 400 metres event at the 2014 World Junior Championships in Athletics was held in Eugene, Oregon, USA, at Hayward Field on 22, 23 and 24 July.

== Medalists ==
Gold	Machel Cedenio; Trinidad and Tobago
Silver	Nobuya Kato; Japan
Bronze	Abbas Abubakar Abbas; Bahrain

== Records ==
Standing records prior to the 2014 World Junior Championships in Athletics
World Junior Record	Steve Lewis (USA)	43.87	Seoul, South Korea	28 September 1988
Championship Record	Hamdan Al-Bishi (KSA)	44.66	Santiago, Chile	20 October 2000
World Junior Leading	Machel Cedenio (TRI)	45.23	George Town, Cayman Islands	7 May 2014
Broken records during the 2014 World Junior Championships in Athletics

== Results ==
=== Final ===
24 July
Start time: 19:44 Temperature: 22 °C Humidity: 46 %

Rank	Name	Nationality	Lane	Reaction Time	Time	Notes
1st place, gold medalist(s)	Machel Cedenio	Trinidad and Tobago	4	0.204	45.13	WJL
2nd place, silver medalist(s)	Nobuya Kato	Japan	3	0.178	46.17	SB
3rd place, bronze medalist(s)	Abbas Abubakar Abbas	Bahrain	7	0.254	46.20	
4	Alexander Lerionka Sampao	Kenya	5	0.223	46.55	
5	Jack Crosby	United Kingdom	1	0.180	46.63	
6	Lamar Bruton-Grinnage	United States	8	0.181	46.75	
7	Kaisei Yui	Japan	2	0.150	47.08	
8	Tyler Brown	United States	6	0.185	47.30	

=== Semifinals ===
23 July
First 2 in each heat (Q) and the next 2 fastest (q) advance to the Final

==== Summary ====
Rank	Name	Nationality	Time	Notes
1	Machel Cedenio	Trinidad and Tobago	45.90	Q
2	Tyler Brown	United States	45.97	Q
3	Alexander Lerionka Sampao	Kenya	46.21	Q
4	Nobuya Kato	Japan	46.26	Q
5	Abbas Abubakar Abbas	Bahrain	46.28	Q
6	Jack Crosby	United Kingdom	46.35	q PB
7	Lamar Bruton-Grinnage	United States	46.67	Q
8	Kaisei Yui	Japan	46.68	q PB
9	Berend Koekemoer	South Africa	46.87	
10	Elliot Rutter	United Kingdom	46.93	
11	Sam Reiser	Australia	47.02	
12	Luka Janežič	Slovenia	47.06	PB
13	Warren Hazel	Saint Kitts and Nevis	47.22	
14	Oleksiy Pozdnyakov	Ukraine	47.43	
15	Batuhan Altıntaş	Turkey	47.46	
16	Nathon Allen	Jamaica	47.56	
17	Juander Santos	Dominican Republic	47.64	
18	Joshua Robinson	Australia	47.72	
19	Henri Delauze	Bahamas	47.78	
20	Janeko Cartwright	Bahamas	47.88	
21	Joshua Cunningham	Canada	47.91	
22	Karabo Sibanda	Botswana	48.30	
23	Martin Manley	Jamaica	48.38	
	Jamal Walton	Cayman Islands	DNF	

==== Details ====
First 2 in each heat (Q) and the next 2 fastest (q) advance to the Final

===== Semifinal 1 =====
24 July
Start time: 18:43 Temperature: 18 °C Humidity: 56%

Rank	Name	Nationality	Lane	Reaction Time	Time	Notes
1	Tyler Brown	United States	5	0.178	45.97	Q
2	Alexander Lerionka Sampao	Kenya	4	0.223	46.21	Q
3	Kaisei Yui	Japan	3	0.170	46.68	q PB
4	Elliot Rutter	United Kingdom	2	0.160	46.93	
5	Oleksiy Pozdnyakov	Ukraine	7	0.213	47.43	
6	Batuhan Altıntaş	Turkey	6	0.175	47.46	
7	Joshua Robinson	Australia	1	0.172	47.72	
8	Karabo Sibanda	Botswana	8	0.206	48.30	

===== Semifinal 2 =====
24 July
Start time: 18:50 Temperature: 18 °C Humidity: 56%

Rank	Name	Nationality	Lane	Reaction Time	Time	Notes
1	Nobuya Kato	Japan	3	0.172	46.26	Q
2	Abbas Abubakar Abbas	Bahrain	4	0.242	46.28	Q
3	Jack Crosby	United Kingdom	5	0.150	46.35	q PB
4	Luka Janežič	Slovenia	8	0.205	47.06	PB
5	Warren Hazel	Saint Kitts and Nevis	2	0.161	47.22	
6	Janeko Cartwright	Bahamas	1	0.184	47.88	
7	Martin Manley	Jamaica	6	0.173	48.38	
	Jamal Walton	Cayman Islands	7	0.200	DNF	

===== Semifinal 3 =====
24 July
Start time: 18:57 Temperature: 18 °C Humidity: 56%

Rank	Name	Nationality	Lane	Reaction Time	Time	Notes
1	Machel Cedenio	Trinidad and Tobago	4	0.214	45.90	Q
2	Lamar Bruton-Grinnage	United States	6	0.196	46.67	Q
3	Berend Koekemoer	South Africa	5	0.181	46.87	
4	Sam Reiser	Australia	8	0.186	47.02	
5	Nathon Allen	Jamaica	1	0.218	47.56	
6	Juander Santos	Dominican Republic	3	0.164	47.64	
7	Henri Delauze	Bahamas	7	0.263	47.78	
8	Joshua Cunningham	Canada	2	0.158	47.91	

=== Heats ===
22 July
First 3 in each heat (Q) and the next 3 fastest (q) advance to the Semi-Finals

==== Summary ====
Rank	Name	Nationality	Time	Notes
1	Nobuya Kato	Japan	46.23	Q
2	Tyler Brown	United States	46.45	Q
3	Jack Crosby	United Kingdom	46.48	Q PB
4	Machel Cedenio	Trinidad and Tobago	46.60	Q
5	Lamar Bruton-Grinnage	United States	46.74	Q
6	Berend Koekemoer	South Africa	46.89	Q
7	Alexander Lerionka Sampao	Kenya	46.91	Q
8	Abbas Abubakar Abbas	Bahrain	46.92	Q
9	Juander Santos	Dominican Republic	47.02	Q
10	Kaisei Yui	Japan	47.06	Q
11	Henri Delauze	Bahamas	47.07	Q
11	Sam Reiser	Australia	47.07	Q
13	Janeko Cartwright	Bahamas	47.10	q
14	Batuhan Altıntaş	Turkey	47.15	Q
15	Oleksiy Pozdnyakov	Ukraine	47.18	Q PB
16	Martin Manley	Jamaica	47.20	Q
17	Jamal Walton	Cayman Islands	47.22	Q
18	Luka Janežič	Slovenia	47.30	Q
19	Warren Hazel	Saint Kitts and Nevis	47.37	Q
20	Joshua Cunningham	Canada	47.40	q
21	Joshua Robinson	Australia	47.47	Q
22	Elliot Rutter	United Kingdom	47.55	q
23	Bálint Móricz	Hungary	47.66	
24	Wiktor Suwara	Poland	47.71	
25	Samson Oghenewegba Nathaniel	Nigeria	47.77	
26	Leungo Scotch	Botswana	47.81	
27	Mazen Al Yasen	Saudi Arabia	47.85	
28	Raymond Kibet	Kenya	47.91	
29	Batinisavu Uluiyata	Fiji	47.95	
30	Karabo Sibanda	Botswana	47.96	Q
31	Abdullah Tütünci	Turkey	48.00	
32	Sina Rohani	Iran	48.03	
32	Mateo Kovačić	Croatia	48.03	
34	Nathon Allen	Jamaica	48.06	Q
35	Benjamin Lobo Vedel	Denmark	48.13	
36	Sonwabiso Skhosana	South Africa	48.16	
37	Brandon Valentine-Parris	Saint Vincent and the Grenadines	48.36	NJR
38	Wang Wei-Hsu	Chinese Taipei	48.61	
39	Shaddy Melu	Zambia	48.74	
40	Graeme Thompson	Canada	49.01	
41	Asa Guevara	Trinidad and Tobago	49.48	
42	Kyle Webb	Bermuda	49.79	
43	Derick St Jean	Dominica	50.32	
44	Vitsanu Phosri	Thailand	50.40	
45	Hussain Riza	Maldives	52.42	PB
46	Karl Baldachino	Gibraltar	54.56	PB
47	Luatimu Samau	Samoa	56.71	
	Fasasi Adekunle Rilwan	Nigeria	DQ	163.3(a)
	Mohamed Nasir Abbas	Qatar	DQ	163.3(a)
	Mikhail Litvin	Kazakhstan	DQ	163.3(a)
	Bachir Mahamat	Chad	DNS	
	Rosel Lusanga Kafwa	DR Congo	DNS	

==== Details ====
First 3 in each heat (Q) and the next 3 fastest (q) advance to the Semi-Finals

===== Heat 1 =====
24 July
Start time: 17:32 Temperature: 26 °C Humidity: 39%

Rank	Name	Nationality	Lane	Reaction Time	Time	Notes
1	Alexander Lerionka Sampao	Kenya	4	0.214	46.91	Q
2	Jamal Walton	Cayman Islands	6	0.163	47.22	Q
3	Joshua Robinson	Australia	8	0.172	47.47	Q
4	Elliot Rutter	United Kingdom	7	0.204	47.55	q
5	Batinisavu Uluiyata	Fiji	5	0.192	47.95	
6	Asa Guevara	Trinidad and Tobago	2	0.222	49.48	
7	Vitsanu Phosri	Thailand	3	0.214	50.40	

===== Heat 2 =====
24 July
Start time: 17:41 Temperature: 26 °C Humidity: 39%

Rank	Name	Nationality	Lane	Reaction Time	Time	Notes
1	Kaisei Yui	Japan	7	0.296	47.06	Q
2	Karabo Sibanda	Botswana	5	0.181	47.96	Q
3	Nathon Allen	Jamaica	4	0.203	48.06	Q
4	Sonwabiso Skhosana	South Africa	2	0.230	48.16	
5	Wang Wei-Hsu	Chinese Taipei	1	0.186	48.61	
6	Graeme Thompson	Canada	3	0.138	49.01	
7	Hussain Riza	Maldives	8	0.215	52.42	PB
	Bachir Mahamat	Chad	6		DNS	

===== Heat 3 =====
24 July
Start time: 17:47 Temperature: 26 °C Humidity: 39%

Rank	Name	Nationality	Lane	Reaction Time	Time	Notes
1	Nobuya Kato	Japan	6	0.187	46.23	Q
2	Lamar Bruton-Grinnage	United States	8	0.208	46.74	Q
3	Oleksiy Pozdnyakov	Ukraine	4	0.198	47.18	Q PB
4	Joshua Cunningham	Canada	2	0.167	47.40	q
5	Leungo Scotch	Botswana	1	0.220	47.81	
6	Brandon Valentine-Parris	Saint Vincent and the Grenadines	5	0.191	48.36	NJR
7	Luatimu Samau	Samoa	7	0.225	56.71	
	Rosel Lusanga Kafwa	DR Congo	3		DNS	

===== Heat 4 =====
24 July
Start time: 17:53 Temperature: 26 °C Humidity: 39%

Rank	Name	Nationality	Lane	Reaction Time	Time	Notes
1	Abbas Abubakar Abbas	Bahrain	3	0.250	46.92	Q
2	Martin Manley	Jamaica	7	0.180	47.20	Q
3	Luka Janežič	Slovenia	6	0.207	47.30	Q
4	Bálint Móricz	Hungary	5	0.325	47.66	
5	Sina Rohani	Iran	4	0.199	48.03	
6	Kyle Webb	Bermuda	2	0.192	49.79	
	Mikhail Litvin	Kazakhstan	8	0.218	DQ	163.3(a)

Note:
IAAF Rule 163.3(a) - Lane infringement

===== Heat 5 =====
24 July
Start time: 18:05 Temperature: 26 °C Humidity: 39%

Rank	Name	Nationality	Lane	Reaction Time	Time	Notes
1	Tyler Brown	United States	3	0.198	46.45	Q
2	Jack Crosby	United Kingdom	4	0.167	46.48	Q PB
3	Sam Reiser	Australia	2	0.187	47.07	Q
4	Janeko Cartwright	Bahamas	8	0.183	47.10	q
5	Wiktor Suwara	Poland	7	0.166	47.71	
6	Raymond Kibet	Kenya	5	0.243	47.91	
7	Shaddy Melu	Zambia	6	0.184	48.74	

===== Heat 6 =====
24 July
Start time: 18:11 Temperature: 27 °C Humidity: 39%

Rank	Name	Nationality	Lane	Reaction Time	Time	Notes
1	Machel Cedenio	Trinidad and Tobago	7	0.255	46.60	Q
2	Juander Santos	Dominican Republic	5	0.179	47.02	Q
3	Henri Delauze	Bahamas	4	0.255	47.07	Q
4	Samson Oghenewegba Nathaniel	Nigeria	2	0.190	47.77	
5	Abdullah Tütünci	Turkey	6	0.160	48.00	
6	Mateo Kovačić	Croatia	3	0.187	48.03	
	Mohamed Nasir Abbas	Qatar	8	0.199	DQ	163.3(a)

Note:
IAAF Rule 163.3(a) - Lane infringement

===== Heat 7 =====
24 July
Start time: 18:17 Temperature: 27 °C Humidity: 39%

Rank	Name	Nationality	Lane	Reaction Time	Time	Notes
1	Berend Koekemoer	South Africa	7	0.228	46.89	Q
2	Batuhan Altıntaş	Turkey	3	0.153	47.15	Q
3	Warren Hazel	Saint Kitts and Nevis	2	0.153	47.37	Q
4	Mazen Al Yasen	Saudi Arabia	6	0.219	47.85	
5	Benjamin Lobo Vedel	Denmark	5	0.165	48.13	
6	Derick St Jean	Dominica	1	0.182	50.32	
7	Karl Baldachino	Gibraltar	4	0.299	54.56	PB
	Fasasi Adekunle Rilwan	Nigeria	8	0.187	DQ	163.3(a)

Note:
IAAF Rule 163.3(a) - Lane infringement

== Participation ==
According to an unofficial count, 50 athletes from 37 countries participated in the event.

- Australia (2)
- Bahamas (2)
- Bahrain (1)
- Bermuda (1)
- Botswana (2)
- Canada (2)
- Cayman Islands (1)
- Chinese Taipei (1)
- Croatia (1)
- Denmark (1)
- Dominica (1)
- Dominican Republic (1)
- Fiji (1)
- Gibraltar (1)
- Hungary (1)
- Iran (1)
- Jamaica (2)
- Japan (2)
- Kazakhstan (1)
- Kenya (2)
- Maldives (1)
- Nigeria (2)
- Poland (1)
- Qatar (1)
- Saint Kitts and Nevis (1)
- Saint Vincent and the Grenadines (1)
- Samoa (1)
- Saudi Arabia (1)
- Slovenia (1)
- South Africa (2)
- Thailand (1)
- Trinidad and Tobago (2)
- Turkey (2)
- Ukraine (1)
- United Kingdom (2)
- United States (2)
- Zambia (1)
