= 2013 World Youth Championships in Athletics – Boys' medley relay =

Boys' medley relay at the 2013 World Youth Championships in Athletics
- Venue: RSC Olimpiyskiy
- Dates: 13 July (heats); 14 July (final)
- Nations: 27
- Winning time: 1:49.23 WYB

Medalists
gold medal	Waseem Williams; Michael O'Hara; Okeen Williams; Martin Manley; Jaheel Hyde; Devaughn Baker	Jamaica
silver medal	Jaalen Jones; Noah Lyles; Taylor McLaughlin; Ryan Clark	United States
bronze medal	Daiki Oda; Shunto Nagata; Kakeru Yamaki; Kaisei Yui	Japan

The boys' medley relay at the 2013 World Youth Championships in Athletics was held on 13 and 14 July.

== Medalists ==
Gold	Silver	Bronze
Jamaica; Waseem Williams; Michael O'Hara; Okeen Williams; Martin Manley; Jaheel Hyde; Devaughn Baker	United States; Jaalen Jones; Noah Lyles; Taylor McLaughlin; Ryan Clark	Japan; Daiki Oda; Shunto Nagata; Kakeru Yamaki; Kaisei Yui

== Records ==
Prior to the competition, the following records were as follows.

World Youth Best	United States	1:49.47	Lille, France	10 July 2011
Championship Record	United States	1:49.47	Lille, France	10 July 2011
World Youth Leading	Gambia	1:53.35	Warri, Nigeria	31 March 2013

== Heats ==
Qualification rule: first of each heat (Q) and the 4 fastest times (q) qualified.

=== Heat 1 ===
Rank	Lane	Nation	Athletes	Time	Note
1	4	Japan	Daiki Oda, Shunto Nagata, Kakeru Yamaki, Kaisei Yui	1:52.18	Q, WYL
2	2	Qatar	Ibrahim Moussa Adam, Khalid Al-Shahrani, Mohamed Nasir Abbas, Mohamed El-Nour	1:52.47	q, PB
3	6	Hungary	Ákos Boda, Richárd Köcse, Csaba Kiss, Szabolcs Vígvári	1:54.01	q, PB
4	7	Poland	Jakub Galandziej, Konrad Ziółkowski, Dawid Kapała, Wiktor Suwara	1:54.29	q, SB
5	5	Kazakhstan	Azamat Dosmuratov, Mikhail Litvin, Dmitriy Karaulov, Ilya Musatov	2:00.60	SB
	3	Great Britain		DNS	

=== Heat 2 ===
Rank	Lane	Nation	Athletes	Time	Note
1	8	Nigeria	Ifeanyi Atuma, Divine Oduduru, Samson Oghenewegba Nathaniel, Omeiza John Akerele	1:52.90	Q, PB
2	2	Bahamas	Keanu Pennerman, Ian Kerr, Kinard Rolle, Henri Delauze	1:53.38	q, SB
3	7	Romania	Ioan Melnicescu, Cristian Radu, Nicolae Gorcea, Cristian Tăut	1:55.90	PB
4	3	Russia	Pavel Vereshchagin, Ilya Kovalenko, Anton Balykin, Ilya Krasnov	1:57.56	SB
5	4	Slovenia	Blaž Murn, Gregor Kovše, Nejc Možina, Jaka Zupan	1:58.42	PB
6	5	Algeria	Abdesselam Bouchamia, Mahmoud Hammoudi, Bilel Gacem, Sofiane Titouah	2:01.52	
	6	Italy	Andrea Federici, Gabriele Gargano, Emanuele Grossi, Giuseppe Leonardi	DQ	

=== Heat 3 ===
Rank	Lane	Nation	Athletes	Time	Note
1	6	United States	Jaalen Jones, Noah Lyles, Ryan Clark, Taylor McLaughlin	1:52.19	Q, SB
2	8	Bahrain	Mohamed Jamal Saad, Mohamed Ghali, Ali Buhmeed, Abbas Abubakar Abbas	1:54.32	PB
3	3	Puerto Rico	Edwin Diodonet, Derick Díaz, Ricardo Torres, Ricardo Piñeiro	1:54.64	SB
4	5	Ukraine	Oleksandr Revenko, Denys Tsven, Mykhaylo Tyutyunnykov, Mykhaylo Yavorskyy	1:55.56	SB
5	2	China	Mo Youxue, Li Zhe, Lu Yang, Jin Ri	1:57.80	SB
	4	South Africa	Cornelius Jansen van Rensburg, Hanno Coetzer, Larry Lombard, Eckhardt Rossouw	DQ	
	7	Denmark		DNS	

=== Heat 4 ===
Rank	Lane	Nation	Athletes	Time	Note
1	8	Jamaica	Waseem Williams, Jaheel Hyde, Devaughn Baker, Martin Manley	1:52.78	Q, SB
2	7	Spain	Aitor Same Ekobo, Javier Delgado, Ryan Wallis, Darwin Echeverry	1:55.61	SB
3	5	Canada	Lucanus Robinson, Davis Edward, Jake Hanna, Cameron Nurse	1:55.72	SB
4	2	Norway	Amund Høie Sjursen, Even Meinseth, Øystein Klareng, Karsten Warholm	1:56.92	SB
5	3	Zimbabwe	Sean Banda, Michael Songore, Tatenda Matesanwa, Nyasha Mutsetse	1:57.77	
6	6	Oman	Saif Al-Obaidani, Zayid Al-Siyabi, Amjad Al-Balushi, Younis Al-Akhzami	2:01.63	
	4	Fiji	Jacob Waqanivalu, Aaron Powell, Saula Nodrakoro, Batinisavu Uluiyata	DQ	

== Final ==
Rank	Lane	Nation	Athletes	Time	Note
1st place, gold medalist(s)	6	Jamaica	Waseem Williams, Michael O'Hara, Okeen Williams, Martin Manley	1:49.23	WYB
2nd place, silver medalist(s)	5	United States	Jaalen Jones, Noah Lyles, Taylor McLaughlin, Ryan Clark	1:50.14	SB
3rd place, bronze medalist(s)	4	Japan	Daiki Oda, Shunto Nagata, Kakeru Yamaki, Kaisei Yui	1:50.52	PB
4	7	Qatar	Ibrahim Moussa Adam, Khalid Al-Shahrani, Mohamed El-Nour, Mohamed Nasir Abbas	1:52.55	
5	8	Bahamas	Keanu Pennerman, Ian Kerr, Kinard Rolle, Henri Delauze	1:52.97	SB
6	1	Poland	Jakub Galandziej, Konrad Ziółkowski, Dawid Kapała, Wiktor Suwara	1:53.36	SB
7	3	Nigeria	Bashiru Abdullahi, Ifeanyi Atuma, Samson Oghenewegba Nathaniel, Omeiza John Akerele	1:53.61	
8	2	Hungary	Ákos Boda, Richárd Köcse, Csaba Kiss, Szabolcs Vígvári	1:54.38	
