= 2014 World Junior Championships in Athletics – Men's 4 × 400 metres relay =

The men's 4 x 400 metres relay event at the 2014 World Junior Championships in Athletics was held in Eugene, Oregon, USA, at Hayward Field on 26 and 27 July.

== Medalists ==
Gold	Josephus Lyles; Tyler Brown; Ricky Morgan; Michael Cherry; United States
Silver	Julian Jrummi Walsh; Kaisei Yui; Takamasa Kitagawa; Nobuya Kato; Japan
Bronze	Twayne Crooks; Martin Manley; Nathon Allen; Jaheel Hyde; Jamaica

== Records ==
Standing records prior to the 2014 World Junior Championships in Athletics
World Junior Record	United States (Brandon Johnson, LaShawn Merritt, Jason Craig, Kerron Clement)	3:01.09	Grosseto, Italy	18 July 2004
Championship Record	United States (Brandon Johnson, LaShawn Merritt, Jason Craig, Kerron Clement)	3:01.09	Grosseto, Italy	18 July 2004
World Junior Leading	Trinidad and Tobago	3:06.02	Fort-de-France, Martinique	21 April 2014
Broken records during the 2014 World Junior Championships in Athletics

== Results ==
=== Final ===
27 July
Start time: 16:56 Temperature: 29 °C Humidity: 35 %

Rank	Name	Nationality	Lane	Reaction Time	Time	Notes
1st place, gold medalist(s)	United States	Josephus Lyles; Tyler Brown; Ricky Morgan; Michael Cherry	6	0.173	3:03.31	WJL
2nd place, silver medalist(s)	Japan	Julian Jrummi Walsh; Kaisei Yui; Takamasa Kitagawa; Nobuya Kato	3	0.151	3:04.11	AJR
3rd place, bronze medalist(s)	Jamaica	Twayne Crooks; Martin Manley; Nathon Allen; Jaheel Hyde	4	0.188	3:04.47	SB
4	United Kingdom	Ben Snaith; Thomas Somers; Elliot Rutter; Jack Crosby	5	0.220	3:06.42	SB
5	Australia	James Kermond; Sam Reiser; Joshua Robinson; Daniel Forsyth	2	0.235	3:06.80	SB
6	Bahamas	Henri Delauze; Janeko Cartwright; Steven Gardiner; Kinard Rolle	1	0.264	3:08.08	
	Botswana	Keetile Unoda; Baboloki Thebe; Leungo Scotch; Karabo Sibanda	7	0.237	DQ	163.3(b)
	South Africa	Sonwabiso Skhosana; Eckhardt Rossouw; Berend Koekemoer; Jon Seeliger	8	0.213	DQ	170.19

Note:
IAAF Rule 163.3(b) - Infringement of the inside border
IAAF Rule 170.19 - Starting outside the takeover zone

Intermediate times:
400m: 45.70 RSA
800m: 1:32.51 USA
1200m: 2:18.27 JAM

=== Heats ===
26 July
First 2 in each heat (Q) and the next 2 fastest (q) advance to the Final

==== Summary ====
Rank	Nation	Time	Notes
1	United States	3:03.97	Q WJL
2	Japan	3:05.40	Q SB
3	Jamaica	3:06.25	Q SB
4	Bahamas	3:07.03	q NJR
5	Botswana	3:07.80	Q SB
6	United Kingdom	3:08.61	Q SB
7	South Africa	3:09.11	Q SB
8	Australia	3:09.22	q SB
9	Nigeria	3:09.37	
10	Turkey	3:10.07	NJR
11	Cuba	3:10.60	SB
12	Germany	3:10.75	
13	Poland	3:10.94	SB
14	Thailand	3:11.50	
15	Canada	3:11.93	SB
16	Trinidad and Tobago	3:12.06	
17	Belgium	3:12.57	

==== Details ====
First 2 in each heat (Q) and the next 2 fastest (q) advance to the Final

===== Heat 1 =====
27 July
Start time: 15:31 Temperature: 30 °C Humidity: 31%

Rank	Nation	Competitors	Lane	Reaction Time	Time	Notes
1	United States	Josephus Lyles; Ricky Morgan; Miles Parish; Michael Cherry	6	0.192	3:03.97	Q WJL
2	Botswana	Karabo Sibanda; Baboloki Thebe; Keetile Unoda; Leungo Scotch	7	0.172	3:07.80	Q SB
3	Australia	James Kermond; Sam Reiser; Joshua Robinson; James Kaluschke	4	0.227	3:09.22	q SB
4	Cuba	Leandro Zamora; Reynier Mena; Santiago Ford; José Luis Gaspar	5	0.191	3:10.60	SB
5	Trinidad and Tobago	Asa Guevara; Breon Mullings; Nathan Farinha; Machel Cedenio	3	0.195	3:12.06	
6	Belgium	Michaël Rossaert; Alexandre Screve; Asamti Badji; Simon de Lange	2	0.258	3:12.57	

Intermediate times:
400m: 45.52 USA
800m: 1:32.54 USA
1200m: 2:18.76 USA

===== Heat 2 =====
27 July
Start time: 15:41 Temperature: 30 °C Humidity: 31%

Rank	Nation	Competitors	Lane	Reaction Time	Time	Notes
1	Japan	Julian Jrummi Walsh; Kaisei Yui; Takamasa Kitagawa; Nobuya Kato	4	0.172	3:05.40	Q SB
2	Jamaica	Ivan Henry; Martin Manley; Twayne Crooks; Nathon Allen	5	0.253	3:06.25	Q SB
3	Bahamas	Henri Delauze; Kinard Rolle; Janeko Cartwright; Steven Gardiner	6	0.237	3:07.03	q NJR
4	Germany	Steffen Schattner; Jakob Krempin; Constantin Schmidt; Laurin Walter	2	0.178	3:10.75	
5	Canada	Daniel Brady; Graeme Thompson; Jared Kerr; Joshua Cunningham	3	0.154	3:11.93	SB
	Puerto Rico	Christian Martínez; Derick Díaz; Ricardo Torres; Andrés Arroyo	7	0.201	DQ	163.3

Note:
IAAF Rule 163.3(a) - Lane infringement

Intermediate times:
400m: 47.53 JPN
800m: 1:33.06 JPN
1200m: 2:18.88 JPN

===== Heat 3 =====
27 July
Start time: 15:50 Temperature: 30 °C Humidity: 31%

Rank	Nation	Competitors	Lane	Reaction Time	Time	Notes
1	United Kingdom	David Hall; Nick Petrou; Ben Snaith; Elliot Rutter	5	0.172	3:08.61	Q SB
2	South Africa	Hanno Coetzer; Sonwabiso Skhosana; Berend Koekemoer; Jon Seeliger	3	0.197	3:09.11	Q SB
3	Nigeria	Samson Oghenewegba Nathaniel; Fasasi Adekunle Rilwan; Sikiru Adeyemi; Omeiza John Akerele	4	0.176	3:09.37	
4	Turkey	Fahri Arsoy; Abdullah Tütünci; Enis Ünsal; Batuhan Altıntaş	6	0.304	3:10.07	NJR
5	Poland	Kajetan Duszyński; Patryk Nurkowski; Łukasz Smolnicki; Wiktor Suwara	2	0.162	3:10.94	SB
6	Thailand	Jaturong Chimruang; Witthawat Thumcha; Treenate Krittanukulwong; Vitsanu Phosri	7	0.184	3:11.50	

Intermediate times:
400m: 46.33 NGR
800m: 1:34.72 UK
1200m: 2:22.33 UK

== Participation ==
According to an unofficial count, 78 athletes from 18 countries participated in the event.

- Australia (5)
- Bahamas (4)
- Belgium (4)
- Botswana (4)
- Canada (4)
- Cuba (4)
- Germany (4)
- Jamaica (5)
- Japan (4)
- Nigeria (4)
- Poland (4)
- Puerto Rico (4)
- South Africa (5)
- Thailand (4)
- Trinidad and Tobago (4)
- Turkey (4)
- United Kingdom (6)
- United States (5)
