= 2022 NACAC Championships – Results =

These are the full results of the 2022 NACAC Championships which were held at the Grand Bahama Sports Complex in Freeport, Bahamas, between August 19 and 21, 2022.

== Men's results ==
=== 100 meters ===
Heats – August 20
Wind:
Heat 1: -0.9 m/s, Heat 2: -1.5 m/s, Heat 3: -2.0 m/s

Rank	Heat	Name	Nationality	Time	Notes
1	1	Ackeem Blake	Jamaica	10.14	Q
2	2	Brandon Carnes	United States	10.29	Q
3	3	Kyree King	United States	10.30	Q
4	1	Rikkoi Brathwaite	British Virgin Islands	10.35	Q
5	3	Cejhae Greene	Antigua and Barbuda	10.37	Q
6	2	Oshane Bailey	Jamaica	10.38	Q
7	2	Shainer Reginfo	Cuba	10.43	q
8	2	Kuron Griffith	Barbados	10.52	q, 10.515
9	1	Eric Harrison Jr.	Trinidad and Tobago	10.52	10.517
10	1	Mc Kish Compton	Saint Vincent and the Grenadines	10.53	
11	1	Ajani Daley	Antigua and Barbuda	10.55	10.541
12	2	Jerod Elcock	Trinidad and Tobago	10.55	10.547
13	3	Kemar Hyman	Cayman Islands	10.62	
14	3	Nadale Buntin	Saint Kitts and Nevis	10.72	
15	2	Isaac Joseph	Haiti	10.73	
16	2	Warren Hazel	Saint Kitts and Nevis	10.77	
17	3	Brandon Jones	Belize	10.91	10.904
18	3	Chrysley Appatore	Guadeloupe	10.91	10.906
19	1	Jemar Ellis	Cayman Islands	10.95	
20	3	Courtney Missick	Turks and Caicos Islands	11.03	
21	2	Javon Rawlins	Saint Vincent and the Grenadines	11.05	
22	1	Samson Colebrooke	Bahamas	11.71	
	1	Melbin Marcelino	Dominican Republic	DNS	

Final – August 20

Wind: -0.4 m/s

Rank	Lane	Name	Nationality	Time	Notes
1st place, gold medalist(s)	5	Ackeem Blake	Jamaica	9.98	CR
2nd place, silver medalist(s)	3	Kyree King	United States	10.08	
3rd place, bronze medalist(s)	4	Brandon Carnes	United States	10.12	
4	7	Cejhae Greene	Antigua and Barbuda	10.17	
5	6	Rikkoi Brathwaite	British Virgin Islands	10.20	
6	2	Shainer Reginfo	Cuba	10.30	
7	8	Oshane Bailey	Jamaica	10.33	
8	1	Kuron Griffith	Barbados	10.50	

=== 200 meters ===
Heats – August 19
Wind:
Heat 1: -0.4 m/s, Heat 2: -0.2 m/s, Heat 3: -0.1 m/s

Rank	Heat	Name	Nationality	Time	Notes
1	3	Andrew Hudson	Jamaica	20.25	Q
2	2	Kyree King	United States	20.29	Q, 20.281
3	1	Josephus Lyles	United States	20.29	Q, 20.284
4	2	Kyle Greaux	Trinidad and Tobago	20.68	Q
5	2	Jazeel Murphy	Jamaica	20.80	q
6	1	Ian Kerr	Bahamas	20.89	Q
7	3	Darion Skerritt	Antigua and Barbuda	21.17	Q
8	3	Suresh Black	Bermuda	21.42	q
9	1	Isaac Joseph	Haiti	21.55	
10	3	Chrysley Appatore	Guadeloupe	21.87	
11	3	Jabari Michael-Khensu	Saint Vincent and the Grenadines	22.03	
11	1	Iñigo Pérez	Honduras	22.11	
	1	Erick Sánchez	Dominican Republic	DNS	
	1	Allan Lacroix	Guadeloupe	DNS	
	1	Mikkel Bassue	British Virgin Islands	DNS	
	2	Richard Richardson	Antigua and Barbuda	DNS	
	2	Jeremy Dalphrase	Guadeloupe	DNS	
	2	Alan Alais	Martinique	DNS	
	3	Yancarlos Martínez	Dominican Republic	DNS	

Final – August 21

Wind: +0.6 m/s

Rank	Lane	Name	Nationality	Time	Notes
1st place, gold medalist(s)	6	Andrew Hudson	Jamaica	19.87	CR
2nd place, silver medalist(s)	4	Kyree King	United States	20.00	
3rd place, bronze medalist(s)	3	Josephus Lyles	United States	20.18	
4	8	Ian Kerr	Bahamas	20.53	
5	1	Jazeel Murphy	Jamaica	20.92	
6	7	Darion Skerritt	Antigua and Barbuda	21.08	
7	2	Suresh Black	Bermuda	21.33	
	5	Kyle Greaux	Trinidad and Tobago	DNF	

=== 400 meters ===
Heats – August 19

Rank	Heat	Name	Nationality	Time	Notes
1	2	Christopher Taylor	Jamaica	45.50	Q
2	1	Nathon Allen	Jamaica	45.85	Q
3	1	Bryce Deadmon	United States	46.63	Q
4	2	Asa Guevara	Trinidad and Tobago	47.08	Q
5	2	Aymeric Fermely	Guadeloupe	47.24	Q
6	1	Kinard Rolle	Bahamas	47.86	Q
7	1	Allan Lacroix	Guadeloupe	48.27	q
8	1	Reinier Pintado	Cuba	49.22	q
9	2	Angelo Garland	Turks and Caicos Islands	49.52	
10	1	Iñigo Pérez	Honduras	49.58	
11	2	Antonio Bailey	Bermuda	50.40	
	1	Robert King	Dominican Republic	DNS	
	2	Alonzo Russell	Bahamas	DNS	

Final – August 20

Rank	Lane	Name	Nationality	Time	Notes
1st place, gold medalist(s)	5	Christopher Taylor	Jamaica	44.63	CR
2nd place, silver medalist(s)	3	Nathon Allen	Jamaica	45.04	
3rd place, bronze medalist(s)	4	Bryce Deadmon	United States	45.06	
4	6	Asa Guevara	Trinidad and Tobago	46.26	
5	7	Aymeric Fermely	Guadeloupe	46.69	
6	8	Kinard Rolle	Bahamas	48.23	
7	2	Reinier Pintado	Cuba	49.09	
8	1	Allan Lacroix	Guadeloupe	51.16	

=== 800 meters ===
August 20

Rank	Name	Nationality	Time	Notes
1st place, gold medalist(s)	Jonah Koech	United States	1:45.87	
2nd place, silver medalist(s)	Handal Roban	Saint Vincent and the Grenadines	1:47.03	NR
3rd place, bronze medalist(s)	Brannon Kidder	United States	1:47.63	
4	Ryan Sánchez	Puerto Rico	1:47.66	
5	Robert Heppenstall	Canada	1:52.36	

=== 1500 meters ===
August 21

Rank	Name	Nationality	Time	Notes
1st place, gold medalist(s)	Eric Holt	United States	3:37.62	CR
2nd place, silver medalist(s)	Josh Thompson	United States	3:37.88	
3rd place, bronze medalist(s)	Charles Philibert-Thiboutot	Canada	3:37.91	
	Johnny Gregorek*	United States	3:38.04	
4	Cameron Proceviat	Canada	3:40.99	
	Kieran Lumb*	Canada	3:43.73	
5	José Eduardo Rodríguez	Mexico	3:46.60	
6	Carlos Alberto Vilches	Puerto Rico	3:50.97	
7	Orlando Cuevas	Mexico	3:52.06	
8	Dage Minors	Bermuda	3:55.09	
9	César Enrique Peraza	El Salvador	3:57.39	
10	Daísnel Barbán	Cuba	3:58.61	
	Robert Heppenstall*	Canada	3:59.31	
11	Ryan Outerbridge	Bermuda	4:03.00	

=== 5000 meters ===
August 20

Rank	Name	Nationality	Time	Notes
1st place, gold medalist(s)	Woody Kincaid	United States	14:48.58	
2nd place, silver medalist(s)	Thomas Fafard	Canada	14:49.91	
3rd place, bronze medalist(s)	Kieran Lumb	Canada	14:50.06	
4	Emmanuel Bor	United States	14:53.33	
5	Orlando Cuevas	Mexico	14:59.76	
	Ehab El-Sandali*	Canada	14:59.81	
	Andrew Alexander	Canada	DNS	
	Sean McGorty	United States	DNS	

=== 10,000 meters ===
August 19

Rank	Name	Nationality	Time	Notes
1st place, gold medalist(s)	Sean McGorty	United States	29:23.77	CR
2nd place, silver medalist(s)	Dillon Maggard	United States	29:33.57	
3rd place, bronze medalist(s)	Andrew Alexander	Canada	29:33.73	
4	Arnald Martínez	Puerto Rico	31:21.88	

=== 110 meters hurdles ===
August 20
Wind: +0.3 m/s

Rank	Lane	Name	Nationality	Time	Notes
1st place, gold medalist(s)	4	Freddie Crittenden	United States	13.00	CR
2nd place, silver medalist(s)	7	Jamal Britt	United States	13.08	
3rd place, bronze medalist(s)	6	Orlando Bennett	Jamaica	13.18	
4	5	Shane Brathwaite	Barbados	13.42	
5	3	Kenny Fletcher	Guadeloupe	13.81	
6	1	Xavier Coakley	Bahamas	13.85	
7	2	Ulric Portier	Guadeloupe	14.38	
	8	Joey Daniels	Canada	DNF	

=== 400 meters hurdles ===
Heats – August 19

Rank	Heat	Name	Nationality	Time	Notes
1	1	CJ Allen	United States	48.76	Q
2	2	Khallifah Rosser	United States	49.18	Q
3	1	Gerald Drummond	Costa Rica	49.68	Q
4	2	Kyron McMaster	British Virgin Islands	49.77	Q
5	2	Shawn Rowe	Jamaica	50.27	Q
6	1	Lázaro Rodríguez	Cuba	50.37	Q
7	1	Shakeem Smith	Bahamas	50.55	q
8	1	Joshua Adhemar	Haiti	52.21	q
9	2	Andre Colebrook	Bahamas	53.27	
	2	Malique Smith	United States Virgin Islands	DNF	

Final – August 21

Rank	Lane	Name	Nationality	Time	Notes
1st place, gold medalist(s)	6	Kyron McMaster	British Virgin Islands	47.34	CR
2nd place, silver medalist(s)	4	Khallifah Rosser	United States	47.59	
3rd place, bronze medalist(s)	3	CJ Allen	United States	48.23	
4	5	Gerald Drummond	Costa Rica	48.88	
5	7	Shawn Rowe	Jamaica	49.05	
6	8	Lázaro Rodríguez	Cuba	50.09	
7	2	Joshua Adhemar	Haiti	52.48	
8	1	Shakeem Smith	Bahamas	52.49	

=== 3000 meters steeplechase ===
August 21

Rank	Name	Nationality	Time	Notes
1st place, gold medalist(s)	Evan Jager	United States	8:22.55	CR
2nd place, silver medalist(s)	Duncan Hamilton	United States	8:31.19	
3rd place, bronze medalist(s)	Jean-Simon Desgagnés	Canada	8:33.25	
	Anthony Rotich*	United States	8:33.67	
4	Víctor Ortiz	Puerto Rico	8:35.73	
5	Ryan Smeeton	Canada	8:54.46	
6	César Daniel Gómez	Mexico	9:00.33	
7	Erick Cayetano	Mexico	9:20.29	

=== 4 × 100 meters relay ===
August 21

Rank	Lane	Nation	Competitors	Time	Notes
1st place, gold medalist(s)		United States	Lawrence Johnson, Brandon Carnes, Isiah Young, Kyree King	38.29	
2nd place, silver medalist(s)		Trinidad and Tobago	Jerod Elcock, Eric Harrison Jr., Asa Guevara, Kyle Greaux	38.94	38.931
3rd place, bronze medalist(s)		Jamaica	Ackeem Blake, Andrew Hudson, Kadrian Goldson, Jazeel Murphy	38.94	38.933
4		Bahamas	Antoine Andrews, Ian Kerr, Carlos Brown Jr., Wanya McCoy	39.42	
5		Guadeloupe	Aymeric Fermely, Chrysley Appatore, Ulric Portier, Kenny Fletcher	41.62	
6		Turks and Caicos Islands	Courtney Missick, Ifeanyichukwu Otuonye, Angelo Garland, Aleiandio Durham	41.91	

=== 4 × 400 meters relay ===
August 21

Rank	Lane	Nation	Competitors	Time	Notes
1st place, gold medalist(s)		United States	Quincy Hall, Ismail Turner, Khallifah Rosser, Bryce Deadmon	3:01.79	
2nd place, silver medalist(s)		Jamaica	Demish Gaye, Karayme Bartley, Javon Francis, Christopher Taylor	3:05.47	
3rd place, bronze medalist(s)		Bahamas	Kinard Rolle, Alonzo Russell, Shakeem Smith, Wendell Miller	3:06.21	

=== 20,000 meters walk ===
August 20

Rank	Name	Nationality	Time	Penalties	Notes
1st place, gold medalist(s)	José Ortiz	Guatemala	1:26:21.08		CR
2nd place, silver medalist(s)	Evan Dunfee	Canada	1:27:17.91	~	
3rd place, bronze medalist(s)	Érick Barrondo	Guatemala	1:28:32.19		
4	Noel Chama	Mexico	1:31:50.18	<	
5	Daniel Nehnevaj	United States	1:42:40.56		
6	Jordan Crawford	United States	1:49:15.32	<	
	Emmanuel Corvera	United States	DQ	<<<<	
	Ronaldo Hernández	Cuba	DNF		
	Nick Christie	United States	DNF		

=== High jump ===
August 20

Rank	Name	Nationality	1.90	1.95	2.00	2.05	2.10	2.13	2.16	2.19	2.22	2.25	2.28	Mark	Notes
1st place, gold medalist(s)	Luis Zayas	Cuba	–	–	–	–	–	–	o	o	xxo	o	xxx	2.25	
1st place, gold medalist(s)	Django Lovett	Canada	–	–	–	–	o	–	o	o	xxo	o	xxx	2.25	
3rd place, bronze medalist(s)	Donald Thomas	Bahamas	–	–	–	o	–	o	xxo	xo	xxo	xxo	r	2.25	
4	Dontavious Hill	United States	–	–	–	o	xo	–	xo	o	o	xxx		2.22	
5	Lushane Wilson	Jamaica	–	–	o	o	o	o	o	xo	xxx			2.19	
6	Shaun Miller	Bahamas	–	–	o	–	o	xxo	–	xxo	xxx			2.19	
7	Marcus Gelpi	Puerto Rico	–	–	–	o	xo	xxo	o	xxx				2.16	
8	Luis Joel Castro	Puerto Rico	–	–	–	–	xxo	–	xxo	xxx				2.16	
9	Kyle Rollins	United States	–	–	–	o	xxx							2.05	
10	Nishorn Pierre	Grenada	–	–	–	xo	xxx							2.05	

=== Pole vault ===
August 21

Rank	Name	Nationality	4.75	4.85	5.05	5.15	5.25	5.46	Mark	Notes
1st place, gold medalist(s)	Eduardo Nápoles	Cuba	–	o	xo	o	o	xxx	5.25	
2nd place, silver medalist(s)	Luke Winder	United States	–	–	xo	x–	xx		5.05	
	Andrew Irwin	United States	–	–	xxx				NM	
	Christiaan Higueros	Guatemala	xxx						NM	

=== Long jump ===
Qualification – August 19

Rank	Group	Name	Nationality	#1	#2	#3	Mark	Notes
1	B	Tajay Gayle	Jamaica	7.83	–	–	7.83	
2	A	Shawn-D Thompson	Jamaica	7.62	7.45	7.76	7.76	
3	A	William Williams	United States	x	7.67	–	7.67	
4	A	Tristan James	Dominica	7.39	x	7.47	7.47	
5	B	LaQuan Nairn	Bahamas	7.45	–	–	7.45	
6	A	Kizan David	Saint Kitts and Nevis	6.97	7.40	7.00	7.40	
7	B	Rayvon Grey	United States	7.28	–	–	7.28	
8	B	Ifeanyichukwu Otuonye	Turks and Caicos Islands	7.16	7.20	7.10	7.20	
9	A	Michael Williams	Puerto Rico	7.20	7.11	7.12	7.20	
10	B	Holland Martin	Bahamas	x	7.18	7.16	7.18	
11	B	Nicolas Arriola	Guatemala	7.06	6.97	6.89	7.06	
12	B	Mikal Dill	Bermuda	6.21	6.08	x	6.21	
13	A	Sadiq Nurse	Bermuda	5.91	5.92	x	5.92	
	A	Ulric Portier	Guadeloupe				DNS	
	A	Alan Alais	Martinique				DNS	
	B	Nishorn Pierre	Grenada				DNS	

Final – August 21

Rank	Name	Nationality	#1	#2	#3	#4	#5	#6	Mark	Notes
1st place, gold medalist(s)	William Williams	United States	7.80	7.89	7.82	7.88	7.89	x	7.89	
2nd place, silver medalist(s)	Tajay Gayle	Jamaica	7.74	7.81	x	x	7.69	7.44	7.81	
3rd place, bronze medalist(s)	Shawn-D Thompson	Jamaica	7.75	7.56	7.73	–	7.66	7.55	7.75	
4	LaQuan Nairn	Bahamas	x	7.40	7.60	7.75	x	7.67	7.75	
5	Tristan James	Dominica	7.34	7.65	7.09	x	x	7.70	7.70	
6	Holland Martin	Bahamas	7.17	7.35	7.15	7.30	7.67	x	7.67	
7	Ifeanyichukwu Otuonye	Turks and Caicos Islands	7.20	7.22	7.47	7.12	–	x	7.47	
8	Michael Williams	Puerto Rico	7.30	6.87	7.05	6.99	6.76	7.32	7.32	
9	Rayvon Grey	United States	7.21	x	7.10				7.21	
10	Kizan David	Saint Kitts and Nevis	7.10	7.19	x				7.19	
11	Nicolas Arriola	Guatemala	6.96	6.88	6.79				6.96	
	Mikal Dill	Bermuda							DNS	

=== Triple jump ===
August 19

Rank	Name	Nationality	#1	#2	#3	#4	#5	#6	Mark	Notes
1st place, gold medalist(s)	Chris Benard	United States	15.78	16.13	16.40	x	16.28	16.14	16.40	
2nd place, silver medalist(s)	Jah-Nhai Perinchief	Bermuda	15.82	x	15.55	x	–	15.89	15.89	
3rd place, bronze medalist(s)	Taeco O'Garro	Antigua and Barbuda	15.08	15.17	15.30	15.31	15.61	15.70	15.70	
4	Kaiwan Culmer	Bahamas	x	15.55	15.36	x	14.84	x	15.55	
5	Fernando Reyes	El Salvador	14.16	14.48	x	14.60	14.22	x	14.60	
6	Kristen Hanna	Bahamas	13.68	13.87	x	–	x	13.66	13.87	

=== Shot put ===
August 19

Rank	Name	Nationality	#1	#2	#3	#4	#5	#6	Mark	Notes
1st place, gold medalist(s)	Roger Steen	United States	x	18.68	19.84	20.24	20.19	20.78	20.78	
2nd place, silver medalist(s)	Adrian Piperi	United States	20.40	20.76	20.38	x	20.48	20.58	20.76	
3rd place, bronze medalist(s)	O'Dayne Richards	Jamaica	20.05	19.34	18.57	19.58	x	19.40	20.05	
4	Eldred Henry	British Virgin Islands	17.97	x	18.20	x	18.49	18.78	18.78	
5	Zack Short	Honduras	17.58	18.66	18.58	x	18.40	18.34	18.66	
6	Rickssen Opont	Haiti	x	18.07	x	x	15.83	17.18	18.07	
7	Juan Carley Vázquez	Cuba	17.99	17.18	x	17.40	17.41	16.99	17.99	
8	Akeem Stewart	Trinidad and Tobago	17.74	17.40	17.96	17.20	x	17.14	17.96	
9	Jorge Luis Contreras	Puerto Rico	x	x	17.17				17.17	

=== Discus throw ===
August 21

Rank	Name	Nationality	#1	#2	#3	#4	#5	#6	Mark	Notes
1st place, gold medalist(s)	Traves Smikle	Jamaica	59.96	62.59	62.89	60.40	61.30	x	62.89	
2nd place, silver medalist(s)	Fedrick Dacres	Jamaica	62.11	61.57	60.77	x	62.79	62.45	62.79	
3rd place, bronze medalist(s)	Mario Díaz	Cuba	x	x	59.07	58.72	62.13	61.12	62.13	
4	Andrew Evans	United States	58.08	61.09	x	55.16	59.14	59.76	61.09	
5	Dallin Shurts	United States	55.39	56.12	56.36	x	55.43	56.36	56.36	
6	Zack Short	Honduras	48.34	46.41	x	50.52	49.40	47.67	50.52	
7	Abel Amstrong Gilet	Haiti	x	x	39.68	42.24	x	47.68	47.68	

=== Hammer throw ===
August 20

Rank	Name	Nationality	#1	#2	#3	#4	#5	#6	Mark	Notes
1st place, gold medalist(s)	Rudy Winkler	United States	x	77.48	x	74.74	78.29	77.96	78.29	CR
2nd place, silver medalist(s)	Daniel Haugh	United States	76.38	75.40	x	74.42	x	74.38	76.38	
3rd place, bronze medalist(s)	Rowan Hamilton	Canada	x	69.90	x	74.36	72.18	x	74.36	
4	Adam Keenan	Canada	x	74.14	74.24	74.21	70.41	x	74.24	
5	Yasmani Fernández	Cuba	69.64	71.45	x	72.92	x	72.81	72.92	
6	Jerome Vega	Puerto Rico	x	x	68.55	69.98	66.10	70.17	70.17	
7	Rickssen Opont	Haiti	51.95	54.35	56.66	55.28	56.64	55.13	56.66	

=== Javelin throw ===
August 20

Rank	Name	Nationality	#1	#2	#3	#4	#5	#6	Mark	Notes
1st place, gold medalist(s)	Curtis Thompson	United States	79.27	x	84.23	x	74.95	77.01	84.23	CR
2nd place, silver medalist(s)	Keshorn Walcott	Trinidad and Tobago	80.37	83.94	82.05	81.66	81.89	78.78	83.94	
3rd place, bronze medalist(s)	Ethan Dabbs	United States	77.86	x	74.20	74.03	81.43	77.48	81.43	
4	Keyshawn Strachan	Bahamas	67.48	71.59	73.63	71.27	x	75.83	75.83	
5	Elvis Graham	Jamaica	67.82	67.90	68.46	65.18	66.32	71.73	71.73	
6	Luis Mario Taracena	Guatemala	65.95	62.92	63.87	63.66	67.70	66.47	67.70	

== Women's results ==
=== 100 meters ===
Heats – August 20
Wind:
Heat 1: +0.1 m/s, Heat 2: -1.5 m/s

Rank	Heat	Name	Nationality	Time	Notes
1	1	Shericka Jackson	Jamaica	10.98	Q
2	1	Michelle-Lee Ahye	Trinidad and Tobago	11.18	Q
3	1	Javianne Oliver	United States	11.20	Q
4	1	Yunisleidy García	Cuba	11.22	q
5	2	Celera Barnes	United States	11.23	Q, 11.223
6	2	Natasha Morrison	Jamaica	11.23	Q, 11.224
7	2	Crystal Emmanuel	Canada	11.39	Q
8	1	Khamica Bingham	Canada	11.41	q
9	2	Anthonique Strachan	Bahamas	11.48	
10	2	Khalifa St. Fort	Trinidad and Tobago	11.60	
11	1	Printassia Johnson	Bahamas	11.66	
12	2	Laura Moreira	Cuba	11.87	
13	2	Hilary Gladden	Belize	13.16	
	1	Liranyi Alonso	Dominican Republic	DNS	
	2	Leelou Ehoulet-Martial	Martinique	DNS	

Final – August 20

Wind: -0.1 m/s

Rank	Lane	Name	Nationality	Time	Notes
1st place, gold medalist(s)	4	Shericka Jackson	Jamaica	10.83	CR
2nd place, silver medalist(s)	5	Celera Barnes	United States	11.10	
3rd place, bronze medalist(s)	6	Natasha Morrison	Jamaica	11.11	
4	7	Javianne Oliver	United States	11.21	
5	3	Michelle-Lee Ahye	Trinidad and Tobago	11.23	
6	8	Crystal Emmanuel	Canada	11.25	
7	1	Yunisleidy García	Cuba	11.03	
8	2	Khamica Bingham	Canada	11.44	

=== 200 meters ===
Heats – August 19
Wind:
Heat 1: -0.6 m/s, Heat 2: -0.3 m/s

Rank	Heat	Name	Nationality	Time	Notes
1	1	Brittany Brown	United States	22.59	Q
2	2	Natalliah Whyte	Jamaica	22.78	Q
3	1	Tynia Gaither	Bahamas	22.82	Q
4	2	A'keyla Mitchell	United States	22.98	Q
5	1	Mauricia Prieto	Trinidad and Tobago	23.48	Q
6	1	Ashley Williams	Jamaica	23.67	q
7	2	Reyare Thomas	Trinidad and Tobago	24.00	Q
8	2	Amanda Crawford	Grenada	24.32	q
9	1	Enis Pérez	Cuba	24.53	
10	1	Keturah Bulford-Trott	Bermuda	26.03	
	2	Caitlyn Bobb	Bermuda	DNS	
	2	Dalhiana Rouvillon	Guadeloupe	DNS	

Final – August 21

Wind: +0.3 m/s

Rank	Lane	Name	Nationality	Time	Notes
1st place, gold medalist(s)	3	Brittany Brown	United States	22.35	CR
2nd place, silver medalist(s)	5	Tynia Gaither	Bahamas	22.41	
3rd place, bronze medalist(s)	6	A'keyla Mitchell	United States	22.53	
4	4	Natalliah Whyte	Jamaica	22.65	
5	7	Mauricia Prieto	Trinidad and Tobago	23.49	
6	2	Ashley Williams	Jamaica	23.75	
7	1	Amanda Crawford	Grenada	23.91	
	8	Reyare Thomas	Trinidad and Tobago	DNF	

=== 400 meters ===
Heats – August 19

Rank	Heat	Name	Nationality	Time	Notes
1	1	Shaunae Miller-Uibo	Bahamas	50.84	Q
2	2	Sada Williams	Barbados	51.48	Q
3	2	Roxana Gómez	Cuba	51.57	Q
4	1	Stephenie Ann McPherson	Jamaica	51.65	Q, 51.644
5	2	Natassha McDonald	Canada	51.65	Q, 51.647
6	2	Junelle Bromfield	Jamaica	51.75	q
7	1	Kyra Constantine	Canada	51.93	Q
8	1	Gabby Scott	Puerto Rico	52.22	q
9	1	Kaelyaah Liburd	British Virgin Islands	54.88	
10	1	Lisneidy Veitía	Cuba	55.09	
11	2	Jenae Ambrose	Bahamas	57.58	
12	2	Tamara Guerrier	Guadeloupe	57.98	
	1	Shayla Cann	Bermuda	DNS	
	1	Anabel Medina	Dominican Republic	DNS	
	2	Caitlyn Bobb	Bermuda	DNS	
	2	Fiordaliza Cofil	Dominican Republic	DNS	

Final – August 20

Rank	Lane	Name	Nationality	Time	Notes
1st place, gold medalist(s)	5	Shaunae Miller-Uibo	Bahamas	49.40	CR
2nd place, silver medalist(s)	4	Sada Williams	Barbados	49.86	
3rd place, bronze medalist(s)	6	Stephenie Ann McPherson	Jamaica	50.36	
4	3	Roxana Gómez	Cuba	51.31	
5	8	Natassha McDonald	Canada	51.51	51.505
6	1	Junelle Bromfield	Jamaica	51.51	51.510
7	2	Gabby Scott	Puerto Rico	52.18	
8	7	Kyra Constantine	Canada	52.29	

=== 800 meters ===
August 20

Rank	Name	Nationality	Time	Notes
1st place, gold medalist(s)	Ajeé Wilson	United States	1:58.47	
2nd place, silver medalist(s)	Allie Wilson	United States	1:58.48	
3rd place, bronze medalist(s)	Adelle Tracey	Jamaica	1:59.54	
4	Jazz Shukla	Canada	2:02.65	
5	Daily Cooper	Cuba	2:04.81	
6	Aziza Ayoub	Puerto Rico	2:05.45	
7	Sonia Gaskin	Barbados	2:07.35	
8	Julie Labach	Canada	2:11.38	
	Tamara Guerrier	Guadeloupe	DNS	

=== 1500 meters ===
August 21

Rank	Name	Nationality	Time	Notes
1st place, gold medalist(s)	Heather MacLean	United States	4:04.53	CR
2nd place, silver medalist(s)	Adelle Tracey	Jamaica	4:08.42	
3rd place, bronze medalist(s)	Helen Schlachtenhaufen	United States	4:10.43	
4	Regan Yee	Canada	4:12.54	
5	Erin Teschuk	Canada	4:12.76	
6	Angelín Figueroa	Puerto Rico	4:17.68	
	Addy Townsend*	Canada	4:24.41	
	Daily Cooper	Cuba	DNS	

=== 5000 meters ===
August 19

Rank	Name	Nationality	Time	Notes
1st place, gold medalist(s)	Natosha Rogers	United States	15:11.68	CR
2nd place, silver medalist(s)	Fiona O'Keeffe	United States	15:15.13	
	Eleanor Fulton*	United States	15:50.31	
3rd place, bronze medalist(s)	Rebecca Bassett	Canada	16:15.95	
4	Gracelyn Larkin	Canada	16:32.07	
5	Anisleidis Ochoa	Cuba	16:55.66	

=== 10,000 meters ===
August 20

Rank	Name	Nationality	Time	Notes
1st place, gold medalist(s)	Stephanie Bruce	United States	33:12.42	CR
2nd place, silver medalist(s)	Emily Lipari	United States	33:54.61	
3rd place, bronze medalist(s)	Beverly Ramos	Puerto Rico	35:01.33	
4	Paola Ramos	Puerto Rico	36:22.33	
5	Yumileydis Mestre	Cuba	39:48.55	

=== 100 meters hurdles ===
Heats – August 19
Wind:
Heat 1: -0.1 m/s, Heat 2: -0.7 m/s

Rank	Heat	Name	Nationality	Time	Notes
1	1	Megan Tapper	Jamaica	12.62	Q
2	1	Alaysha Johnson	United States	12.68	Q
3	2	Tonea Marshall	United States	12.75	Q
4	2	Devynne Charlton	Bahamas	12.76	Q
5	1	Michelle Harrison	Canada	13.17	Q
6	1	Paola Vázquez	Puerto Rico	13.34	q
7	1	Greisys Robles	Cuba	13.43	q
8	1	Denisha Cartwright	Bahamas	13.56	
9	2	Dalhiana Rouvillon	Guadeloupe	13.65	Q
10	2	Nancy Sandoval	El Salvador	14.22	
	2	Crystal Morrison	Jamaica	DNS	
	2	Mulern Jean	Haiti	DNS	

Final – August 20

Wind: -0.8 m/s

Rank	Lane	Name	Nationality	Time	Notes
1st place, gold medalist(s)	3	Alaysha Johnson	United States	12.62	
2nd place, silver medalist(s)	4	Megan Tapper	Jamaica	12.68	
3rd place, bronze medalist(s)	6	Devynne Charlton	Bahamas	12.71	
4	5	Tonea Marshall	United States	12.75	
5	8	Michelle Harrison	Canada	13.05	
6	2	Paola Vázquez	Puerto Rico	13.44	
7	1	Greisys Robles	Cuba	13.63	
8	7	Dalhiana Rouvillon	Guadeloupe	14.00	

=== 400 meters hurdles ===
August 21

Rank	Lane	Name	Nationality	Time	Notes
1st place, gold medalist(s)	4	Shiann Salmon	Jamaica	54.22	
2nd place, silver medalist(s)	6	Janieve Russell	Jamaica	54.87	
3rd place, bronze medalist(s)	3	Cassandra Tate	United States	55.62	
4	7	Grace Claxton	Puerto Rico	56.37	
5	8	Deonca Bookman	United States	57.30	
6	2	Daniela Rojas	Costa Rica	58.46	
7	5	Noelle Montcalm	Canada	58.84	
	1	Ashantie Carr	Belize	DQ	

=== 3000 meters steeplechase ===
August 19

Rank	Name	Nationality	Time	Notes
1st place, gold medalist(s)	Gabrielle Jennings	United States	9:34.36	CR
2nd place, silver medalist(s)	Katie Rainsberger	United States	9:40.74	
	Carmen Graves*	United States	9:44.68	
4	Regan Yee	Canada	9:54.92	
5	Grace Fetherstonhaugh	Canada	9:59.65	
6	Jessica Furlan*	Canada	10:13.32	
7	Alondra Negrón	Puerto Rico	10:35.96	

=== 4 × 100 meters relay ===
August 21

Rank	Lane	Nation	Competitors	Time	Notes
1st place, gold medalist(s)		United States	Javianne Oliver, Teahna Daniels, Morolake Akinosun, Celera Barnes	42.35	
2nd place, silver medalist(s)		Bahamas	Printassia Johnson, Anthonique Strachan, Devynne Charlton, Tynia Gaither	43.34	
3rd place, bronze medalist(s)		Jamaica	Natalliah Whyte, Natasha Morrison, Briana Williams, Megan Tapper	43.39	
4		Trinidad and Tobago	Khalifa St. Fort, Mauricia Prieto, Reyare Thomas, Shaniqua Bascombe	43.81	
5		Cuba	Laura Moreira, Enis Pérez, Greisys Roble, Yunisleidy García	44.46	

=== 4 × 400 meters relay ===
August 21

Rank	Lane	Nation	Competitors	Time	Notes
1st place, gold medalist(s)		United States	Kaylin Whitney, Kyra Jefferson, A'Keyla Mitchell, Jaide Stepter Baynes	3:23.54	CR
2nd place, silver medalist(s)		Jamaica	Andrenette Knight, Junelle Bromfield, Shiann Salmon, Janieve Russell	3:26.32	

=== 20,000 meters walk ===
August 20

Rank	Name	Nationality	Time	Penalties	Notes
1st place, gold medalist(s)	Guatemala	Mirna Ortiz	1:40:04.78	<	CR
2nd place, silver medalist(s)	United States	Robyn Stevens	1:40:47.16		
3rd place, bronze medalist(s)	United States	Maria Michta-Coffey	1:42:14.32		
	United States	Stephanie Casey*	1:44:07.08		
4	Cuba	Yuniabel Contreras	1:57:27.51		
	United States	Miranda Melville	DQ	<<<<	

=== High jump ===
August 19

Rank	Name	Nationality	1.60	1.65	1.70	1.75	1.78	1.81	1.84	1.87	1.92	Mark	Notes
1st place, gold medalist(s)	Vashti Cunningham	United States	–	–	–	–	–	–	o	o	o	1.92	CR
2nd place, silver medalist(s)	Rachel Glenn	United States	–	–	–	xo	o	xo	xo	xxx		1.84	
3rd place, bronze medalist(s)	Ximena Esquivel	Mexico	–	–	o	o	o	o	xxx			1.81	
4	Sakari Famous	Bermuda	–	–	o	xo	o	xxx				1.78	
5	Claudina Díaz	Mexico	–	xo	o	xxo	o	xxx				1.78	
6	Kimberly Williamson	Jamaica	–	–	–	xxo	–	xxx				1.75	
6	Barbara Bitchoka	Canada	o	o	o	xxo	xxx					1.75	
8	Yashira Rhymer-Stuart	United States Virgin Islands	xo	o	xxx							1.65	
	Dacsy Brisón	Cuba	–	–	xxx							NM	
	Marysabel Senyu	Dominican Republic										DNS	
	Priscillia Fonds	Guadeloupe										DNS	

=== Pole vault ===
August 20

Rank	Name	Nationality	3.80	3.90	4.00	4.10	4.20	4.25	4.30	4.35	4.40	4.45	4.50	4.60	Mark	Notes
1st place, gold medalist(s)	Alina McDonald	United States	–	–	o	o	o	–	o	–	o	–	o	xxx	4.50	
2nd place, silver medalist(s)	Emily Grove	United States	–	–	o	xxo	xo	–	xxo	–	xxx				4.40	
3rd place, bronze medalist(s)	Rachel Hyink	Canada	–	xxo	xo	xxo	xo	xxx							4.20	
4	Aslin Quiala	Cuba	–	–	o	xxx									4.00	
5	Viviana Quintana	Puerto Rico	–	xo	o	xxx									4.00	
6	Robin Bone	Canada	xo	xo	o	xxx									4.00	
7	Diamara Planell	Puerto Rico	–	o	xxx										3.90	
	Andrea Michelle Velasco	El Salvador	xxx												NM	

=== Long jump ===
August 20

Rank	Name	Nationality	#1	#2	#3	#4	#5	#6	Mark	Notes
1st place, gold medalist(s)	Quanesha Burks	United States	6.34	6.59	6.75	x	6.43	6.46	6.75	
2nd place, silver medalist(s)	Christabel Nettey	Canada	6.22	6.42	6.44	6.46	6.37	6.37	6.46	
3rd place, bronze medalist(s)	Chanice Porter	Jamaica	6.39	x	x	6.34	6.39	6.43	6.43	
4	Thea LaFond	Dominica	5.99	6.15	5.97	5.94	6.20	6.34	6.34	
5	Paola Fernández	Puerto Rico	6.22	6.20	x	x	6.31	6.27	6.31	
6	Tiffany Flynn	United States	6.21	6.26	6.27	6.12	6.14	6.14	6.27	
7	Allysbeth Felix	Puerto Rico	6.24	6.20	6.16	x	6.09	6.14	6.24	
8	Thelma Fuentes	Guatemala	5.85	x	5.73	5.80	x	5.53	5.85	
9	Ashantie Carr	Belize	5.26	5.53	5.30				5.53	

=== Triple jump ===
August 21

Rank	Name	Nationality	#1	#2	#3	#4	#5	#6	Mark	Notes
1st place, gold medalist(s)	Thea LaFond	Dominica	13.78	x	14.18	x	x	14.49	14.49	CR
2nd place, silver medalist(s)	Keturah Orji	United States	13.64	14.32	x	x	x	x	14.32	
3rd place, bronze medalist(s)	Davisleidys Velazco	Cuba	x	14.08	13.97	13.46	13.74	x	14.08	
4	Tamara Myers	Bahamas	x	13.62	13.69	x	x	x	13.69	
5	Arianna Fisher	United States	12.96	12.85	x	x	x	12.72	12.96	
6	Thelma Fuentes	Guatemala	12.31	12.50	12.54	12.62	12.55	x	12.62	
	Mikeisha Welcome	Saint Vincent and the Grenadines							DNS	
	Ana José Tima	Dominican Republic							DNS	

=== Shot put ===
August 21

Rank	Name	Nationality	#1	#2	#3	#4	#5	#6	Mark	Notes
1st place, gold medalist(s)	Sarah Mitton	Canada	18.74	19.17	20.15	18.89	19.72	x	20.15	CR
2nd place, silver medalist(s)	Jessica Woodard	United States	15.78	17.02	18.73	18.37	x	18.82	18.82	
3rd place, bronze medalist(s)	Jessica Ramsey	United States	18.45	17.97	x	18.74	x	18.30	18.74	
4	Lloydrecia Cameron	Jamaica	16.19	16.31	16.40	x	15.95	16.42	16.42	
5	Layselis Jiménez	Cuba	15.94	15.92	15.67	16.03	16.10	15.57	16.10	
6	Maia Campbell	United States Virgin Islands	x	14.03	x	14.03	14.24	13.99	14.24	
7	Priscilla Fonds	Guadeloupe	12.48	–	x	–	–	12.18	12.48	

=== Discus throw ===
August 19

Rank	Name	Nationality	#1	#2	#3	#4	#5	#6	Mark	Notes
1st place, gold medalist(s)	Laulauga Tausaga-Collins	United States	62.21	63.18	60.08	58.85	60.58	x	63.18	CR
2nd place, silver medalist(s)	Denia Caballero	Cuba	58.09	x	x	x	55.57	61.86	61.86	
3rd place, bronze medalist(s)	Rachel Dincoff	United States	57.61	x	58.43	58.98	x	61.56	61.56	
4	Silinda Morales	Cuba	59.22	59.84	58.11	60.73	58.14	59.02	60.73	
5	Samantha Hall	Jamaica	57.70	x	52.90	x	x	57.21	57.70	
6	Tiara Derosa	Bermuda	x	45.77	46.42	x	44.71	46.22	46.42	
7	Lalenii Grant	Trinidad and Tobago	x	x	39.64	43.40	43.97	x	43.97	

=== Hammer throw ===
August 19

Rank	Name	Nationality	#1	#2	#3	#4	#5	#6	Mark	Notes
1st place, gold medalist(s)	Janee' Kassanavoid	United States	64.74	69.95	x	x	x	71.51	71.51	
2nd place, silver medalist(s)	Brooke Andersen	United States	x	x	x	x	68.66	x	68.66	
3rd place, bronze medalist(s)	Jillian Weir	Canada	64.27	x	x	x	66.20	65.83	66.20	
4	Yaritza Martínez	Cuba	62.34	61.05	62.84	58.28	62.89	x	62.89	
5	Kaila Butler	Canada	x	60.73	59.02	x	60.60	59.59	60.73	
6	Tahejee Thurston	Bahamas	x	54.86	x	52.99	x	x	54.86	

=== Javelin throw ===
August 21

Rank	Name	Nationality	#1	#2	#3	#4	#5	#6	Mark	Notes
1st place, gold medalist(s)	Kara Winger	United States	57.17	64.68	56.46	x	60.10	58.84	64.68	CR
2nd place, silver medalist(s)	Ariana Ince	United States	59.69	x	x	54.21	x	53.07	59.69	
3rd place, bronze medalist(s)	Rhema Otabor	Bahamas	50.35	57.91	x	x	x	x	57.91	
4	Coralys Ortiz	Puerto Rico	54.15	54.12	55.68	x	54.86	53.53	55.68	
5	Liz Gleadle	Canada	x	54.11	55.56	x	55.25	54.46	55.56	
6	Sophia Rivera	Puerto Rico	48.28	49.63	x	46.76	49.50	47.86	49.63	
7	Priscilla Fonds	Guadeloupe	40.19	39.32	33.56	x	38.80	38.25	40.19	

== Mixed results ==
=== 4 × 400 meters relay ===
August 20

Rank	Lane	Nation	Competitors	Time	Notes
1st place, gold medalist(s)		United States	Quincy Hall (M), Jaide Stepter Baynes (W), Ismail Turner (M), Kaylin Whitney (W)	3:12.05	CR
2nd place, silver medalist(s)		Jamaica	Demish Gaye (M), Junelle Bromfield (W), Karayme Bartley (M), Andrenette Knight (W)	3:14.08	
3rd place, bronze medalist(s)		Cuba	Reinier Pintado (M), Roxana Gómez (W), Lázaro Rodríguez (M), Lisneidy Veitía (W)	3:20.35	
4		Guadeloupe	Aymeric Fermely (M), Dalhiana Rouvillon (W), Allan Lacroix (M), Tamara Guerrier (W)	3:33.61	
