= Botswana at the 2014 Summer Youth Olympics =

- IOC code: BOT
- NOC: Botswana National Olympic Committee

in Nanjing
- Competitors: 8 in 4 sports
- Medals Ranked 61st: Gold 0 Silver 2 Bronze 0 Total 2

Summer Youth Olympics appearances
- 2010; 2014; 2018; 2026

Botswana competed at the 2014 Summer Youth Olympics, in Nanjing, China from 16 August to 28 August 2014.

== Medalists ==
Medal	Name	Sport	Event	Date
Silver	Karabo Sibanda	Athletics	Boys' 400 m	23 August
Silver	Baboloki Thebe	Athletics	Boys' 200 m	24 August

== Athletics ==
Botswana qualified five athletes.

Qualification Legend: Q=Final A (medal); qB=Final B (non-medal); qC=Final C (non-medal); qD=Final D (non-medal); qE=Final E (non-medal)

Boys
Track & road events

Athlete	Event	Heats		Final	
Athlete	Event	Result	Rank	Result	Rank
Baboloki Thebe	200 m	20.99	2 Q	21.20	2nd place, silver medalist(s)
Karabo Sibanda	400 m	47.43	4 Q	46.76	2nd place, silver medalist(s)
Gorata Gabankitse	800 m	1:54.66	14 qB	1:58.30	13
Kagiso Kebatshwaretse	3000 m	8:45.33 PB	13 qB	8:39.38 PB	13

Girls
Track & road events

Athlete	Event	Heats		Final	
Athlete	Event	Result	Rank	Result	Rank
Thandi Uerimuna	800 m	2:11.97	14 qB	2:12.13	13

== Badminton ==
Botswana was given a quota to compete by the tripartite committee.

Singles

Athlete	Event	Group stage				Quarterfinal	Semifinal	Final / BM	Rank
Athlete	Event	Opposition Score	Opposition Score	Opposition Score	Rank	Opposition Score	Opposition Score	Opposition Score	Rank
Tessa Kabelo	Girls' Singles	Liang XY (SIN); L 0 – 2	A Demirbag (TUR); L 0 – 2	G Kim (KOR); L 0 – 2	4	Did not advance			

Doubles

Athlete	Event	Group stage				Quarterfinal	Semifinal	Final / BM	Rank
Athlete	Event	Opposition Score	Opposition Score	Opposition Score	Rank	Opposition Score	Opposition Score	Opposition Score	Rank
Tessa Kabelo (BOT); Aditya Joshi (IND)	Mixed Doubles	A Yamaguchi (JPN); R Sarsiekienov (UKR); L 0 – 2	A Chen (NED); A Krapez (SLO); L 1 – 2	M Mitsova (BUL); A Hussein (EGY); W 2 – 1	3	Did not advance			

== Judo ==
Botswana was given a quota to compete by the tripartite committee.

Individual

Athlete	Event	Quarterfinals	Semifinals	Final / BM	Rank
Athlete	Event	Opposition Result	Opposition Result	Opposition Result	Rank
Gavin Mogopa	Boys' -55 kg	O Karaca (TUR); L 0000 – 1000	Did not advance	J Verstraeten (BEL); L 0000 – 1000	5

Team

Athletes	Event	Round of 16	Quarterfinals	Semifinals	Final	Rank
Athletes	Event	Opposition Result	Opposition Result	Opposition Result	Opposition Result	Rank
Team Kano; Melisa Çakmaklı (TUR); Salim Darukhi (TJK); Mariam Janashvili (GEO); Arso Milic (MNE); Gavin Mogopa (BOT); Elvismar Rodriguez (VEN); Stoyan Tarapanov (BUL); Tea Tintor (SRB)	Mixed Team	Team Rouge (MIX); L 2 – 5	Did not advance			9

== Swimming ==
Botswana qualified one swimmer.

Girls

Athlete	Event	Heat		Semifinal		Final	
Athlete	Event	Time	Rank	Time	Rank	Time	Rank
Naomi Ruele	50 m backstroke	29.86	17	Did not advance			
Naomi Ruele	100 m backstroke	1:05.98	29	Did not advance			
