= Judo at the 2014 Summer Youth Olympics – Boys' 55 kg =

Judo competition

Boys' 55 kg at the II Summer Youth Olympic Games
- Venue: Longjiang Gymnasium
- Date: August 17
- Competitors: 6 from 6 nations

Medalists
1st place, gold medalist(s)		Bauyrzhan Zhauyntayev	Kazakhstan
2nd place, silver medalist(s)		Natig Gurbanli	Azerbaijan
3rd place, bronze medalist(s)		Jorre Verstraeten	Belgium
3rd place, bronze medalist(s)		Oğuzhan Karaca	Turkey

The Boys' 55 kg tournament in Judo at the 2014 Summer Youth Olympics was held on August 17 at the Longjiang Gymnasium.

This event was the lightest of the boy's judo weight classes, limiting competitors to a maximum of 55 kilograms of body mass. The tournament bracket consisted of a single-elimination contest culminating in a gold medal match. There was also a repechage to determine the winners of the two bronze medals. Each judoka who had lost before the finals competed in the repechage with the two finalists getting bronze medals.

== Results ==
=== Main Bracket ===
Round of 16

Quarterfinals
Bauyrzhan Zhauyntayev (KAZ)
Bye
Gavin Mogopa (BOT)	000
Oğuzhan Karaca (TUR)	100
Natig Gurbanli (AZE)
Bye
Jorre Verstraeten (BEL)	100
Bryan Jolly (AUS)	000

Semifinals
Bauyrzhan Zhauyntayev (KAZ)	001
Oğuzhan Karaca (TUR)	000
Natig Gurbanli (AZE)	001
Jorre Verstraeten (BEL)	000

Finals
Bauyrzhan Zhauyntayev (KAZ)	001
Natig Gurbanli (AZE)	000

=== Repechage ===
Repechage 1
Bye
Gavin Mogopa (BOT)
Bye
Bryan Jolly (AUS)

Repechage 2
Gavin Mogopa (BOT)
Bye
Bryan Jolly (AUS)
Bye

Bronze Medal Finals
Gavin Mogopa (BOT)	000
Jorre Verstraeten (BEL)	100
Bryan Jolly (AUS)	000
Oğuzhan Karaca (TUR)	010
