= Asa Guevara =

Trinidadian sprinter

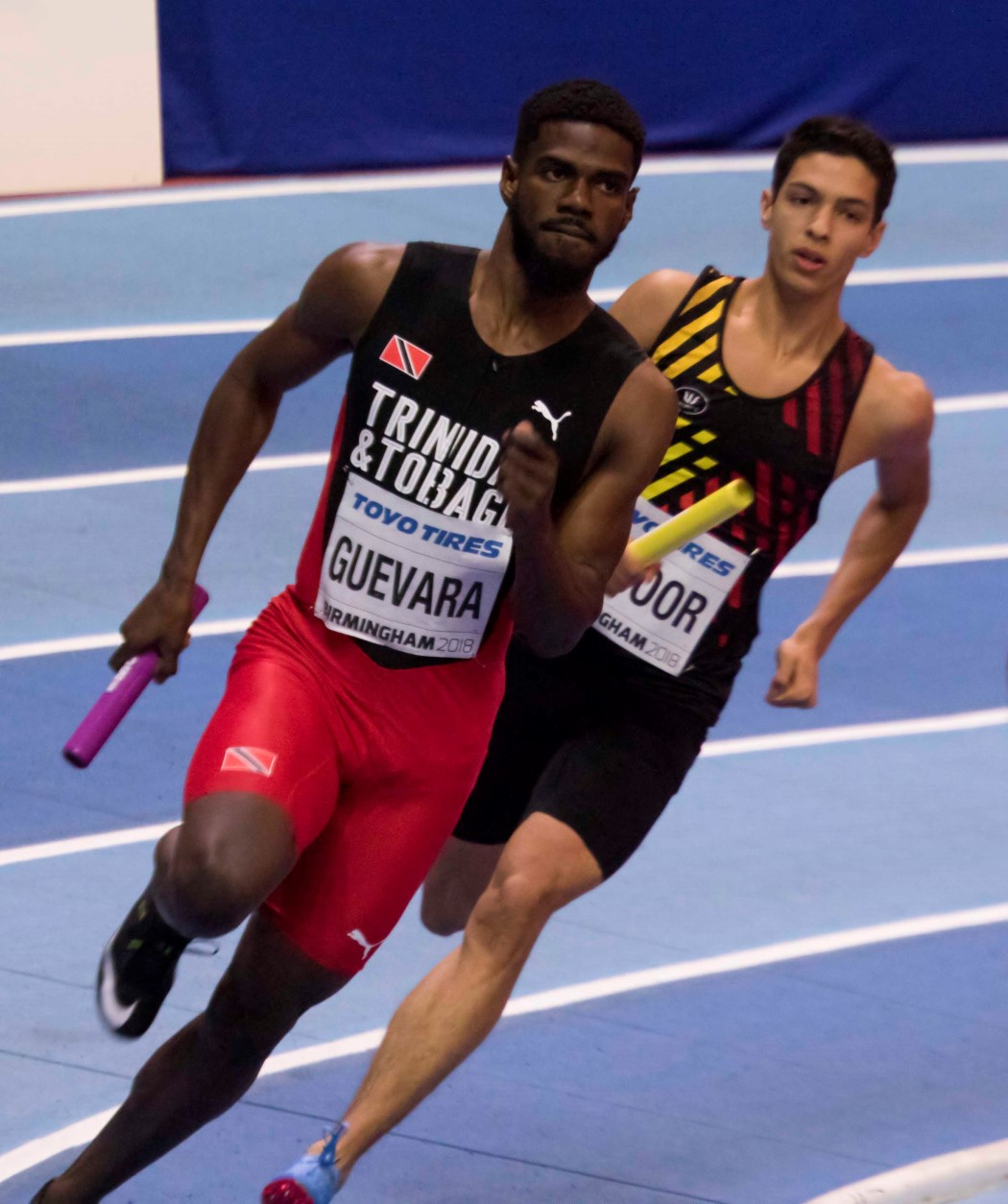
- Guevara in 2018

Personal information
- Born: 20 December 1995 (age 29) Chaguanas, Trinidad and Tobago
- Education: University of Texas at El Paso

Sport
- Sport: Athletics
- Event: 400 metres

Asa Guevara (born 20 December 1995) is a sprinter from Trinidad and Tobago specialising in the 400 metres. He represented his country at the 2018 World Indoor Championships reaching the semifinals. At the 2019 edition of the IAAF World Relays which took place in Yokohoma, Japan, Guevara ran on the third leg as part of the Trinidad and Tobago men's 4x400m relay. The team grabbed gold in what was a world leading time of 3:00:81.

After the two- year hiatus from sport due to the Covid-19 pandemic, Guevara finished second at the Trinidad and Tobago NGC National Senior Open Championships 2022 in the 400m in a time of 46.16s and was subsequently selected to run on the men's 4x400m relay squad at the 2022 Commonwealth Games in Birmingham, England. The team eventually won the final in a time of 3:01:29.

He competed collegiately at Academy of Art University and the University of Texas at El Paso.

== International competitions ==
Year	Competition	Venue	Position	Event	Notes
Representing Trinidad and Tobago
2011	CARIFTA Games (U17)	Montego Bay, Jamaica	2nd	4 × 400 m relay	3:15.35
2012	CARIFTA Games (U20)	Hamilton, Bermuda	15th (h)	200 m	22.16
2012	CARIFTA Games (U20)	Hamilton, Bermuda	2nd	4 × 400 m relay	3:11.62
2012	Central American and Caribbean; Junior Championships (U18)	San Salvador, El Salvador	5th	400 m	21.49
2012	Central American and Caribbean; Junior Championships (U18)	San Salvador, El Salvador	1st	4 × 400 m relay	3:11.66
2012	World Junior Championships	Barcelona, Spain	35th (h)	400 m	47.93
2012	World Junior Championships	Barcelona, Spain	3rd	4 × 400 m relay	3:06.32
2013	CARIFTA Games (U20)	Nassau, Bahamas	3rd	400 m	47.35
2013	CARIFTA Games (U20)	Nassau, Bahamas	2nd	4 × 400 m relay	3:06.23
2014	CARIFTA Games (U20)	Fort-de-France, Martinique	3rd	400 m	47.35
2014	CARIFTA Games (U20)	Fort-de-France, Martinique	1st	4 × 400 m relay	3:06.02
2014	Central American and Caribbean; Junior Championships (U20)	San Salvador, El Salvador	3rd	4 × 400 m relay	3:13.73
2014	World Junior Championships	Eugene, United States	41st (h)	400 m	49.48
2014	World Junior Championships	Eugene, United States	16th (h)	4 × 400 m relay	3:12.06
2018	World Indoor Championships	Birmingham, United Kingdom	12th (sf)	400 m	46.91
2018	World Indoor Championships	Birmingham, United Kingdom	4th	4 × 400 m relay	3:02.52
2019	World Relays	Yokohama, Japan	1st	4 × 400 m relay	3:00.81
2019	World Championships	Doha, Qatar	5th	4 × 400 m relay	3:00.74
2022	World Championships	Eugene, United States	5th	4 × 400 m relay	3:00.03
2022	NACAC Championships	Freeport, Bahamas	4th	400 m	46.26
2022	NACAC Championships	Freeport, Bahamas	2nd	4 × 100 m relay	38.94
2023	World Championships	Budapest, Hungary	14th (h)	4 × 400 m relay	3:01.54

== Personal bests ==
Outdoor

- 100 metres – 10.53 (+1.2 m/s, Berkeley 2016)
- 200 metres – 20.51 (+0.8 m/s, Tucson 2018)
- 400 metres – 45.26 (Houston 2018)

Indoor

- 60 metres – 6.84 (Albuquerque 2017)
- 200 metres – 21.43 (Albuquerque 2017)
- 400 metres – 46.57 (Albuquerque 2018)
