= Ousseini Djibo Idrissa =

Nigerien sprinter (born 1998)

Personal information
- Born: 28 December 1998 (age 27)

Sport
- Country: Niger
- Sport: Athletics

Ousseini Djibo Idrissa (born 28 December 1998) is a Nigerien sprinter. He competed in the men's 400 metres at the 2016 Summer Olympics.
