= Berend Koekemoer =

South African sprinter

Personal information
- Born: 12 June 1995 (age 31) Graaff-Reinet, Eastern Cape, South Africa

Sport
- Sport: Athletics
- Event: 400 metres
- Coached by: Paul Gorries
- Updated on 29 August 2015

Berend Koekemoer (born 12 June 1995) is a male South African sprinter specialising in the 400 metres. He competed at the 2015 World Championships in Beijing without advancing from the first round.

His personal best in the event is 45.42 seconds set in Potchefstroom in 2015.

== International competitions ==
| Year | Competition | Venue | Position | Event | Notes |
Representing South Africa
| 2014 | World Junior Championships | Eugene, United States | 9th (sf) | 400 m | 46.87 |
| 2014 | World Junior Championships | Eugene, United States | 7th (h) | 4 × 400 m relay | 3:09.11^{1} |
| 2015 | World Championships | Beijing, China | 44th (h) | 400 m | 46.52 |

^{1}Disqualified in the final
