= Warren Hazel =

Saint Kitts and Nevis sprinter (born 1996)

Personal information
- Full name: Warren Stivaugh Hazel
- Born: February 11, 1996 (age 30) Old Road, Saint Kitts

Sport
- Country: Saint Kitts and Nevis
- Sport: Athletics
- Event: 400 m
- College team: Southern Illinois
- Coached by: Lonzo Wilkinson
Medal record
Men's athletics
Representing Saint Kitts and Nevis
CARIFTA Games (Junior)
Bronze medal – third place	2015 Basseterre	200 m
- Updated on 10 March 2018

Warren Hazel (born 11 February 1996 in Old Road) is a Saint Kitts and Nevisian athlete who specializes in the 400 metres. He is the 400 metres national record holder. He is studied at Southern Illinois University, United States. He represented Saint Kitts and Nevis at the 2018 Commonwealth Games.

== Personal best ==
Event	Result	Venue	Date
100 m	10.31 s (wind: +1.8 m/s)	(United States) New York	12 June 2022
200 m	20.81 s (wind: +1.4 m/s)	(United States) Terre Haute	13 May 2018
400 m	45.68 s	(The Bahamas) Freeport	22 July 2017

== Achievements ==
Year	Competition	Venue	Position	Event	Notes
Representing Saint Kitts and Nevis
2013	CARIFTA Games (U20)	Nassau, Bahamas	11th (h)	400 m	49.65
2013	Leeward Islands Junior Championships	Road Town, British Virgin Islands	4th	200 m	21.80
2013	Leeward Islands Junior Championships	Road Town, British Virgin Islands	2nd	400 m	49.14
2013	IAAF World Youth Championships	Donetsk, Ukraine	10th (sf)	400 m	47.07 PB
2014	CARIFTA Games (U20)	Fort-de-France, Martinique	9th (h)	400 m	48.77
2014	CAC Junior Championships	Morelia, Mexico	3rd	400 m	46.72
2014	World Junior Championships	Eugene, United States	13th (sf)	400 m	47.22
2014	Central American and Caribbean Games	Veracruz, Mexico	15th (h)	400 m	48.54
2015	CARIFTA Games (U20)	Basseterre, Saint Kitts and Nevis	3rd	200 m	21.81 (wind: -0.6 m/s)
2015	CARIFTA Games (U20)	Basseterre, Saint Kitts and Nevis	4th	400 m	48.04
2016	NACAC U23 Championships	San Salvador, El Salvador	3rd	400 m	45.81 NR
2017	World Championships	London, Great Britain	42nd (q)	400 m	46.96
2018	Commonwealth Games	Gold Coast, Australia	18th (sf)	400 m	47.03
2018	Central American and Caribbean Games	Barranquilla, Colombia	12th (sf)	400 m	47.36
2022	Commonwealth Games	Birmingham, United Kingdom	19th (sf)	200 m	21.40
2022	NACAC Championships	Freeport, Bahamas	16th (h)	100 m	10.77
2023	Central American and Caribbean Games	San Salvador, El Salvador	11th (h)	200 m	21.06
2023	Pan American Games	Santiago, Chile	9th (h)	4 × 100 m relay	39.93
