= Nobuya Kato =

Japanese sprinter (born 1995)

Personal information
- Nationality: Japan
- Born: 16 April 1995 (age 31) Iwata, Shizuoka, Japan
- Education: Waseda University
- Height: 1.85 m (6 ft 1 in)
- Weight: 68 kg (150 lb)

Sport
- Sport: Track and field
- Event: 400 metres
- Club: HULFT

Achievements and titles
- Personal best: 45.69 (Fukuroi 2013)
Medal record
Men's athletics
Representing Japan
Asian Games
| Gold medal – first place | 2014 Incheon | 4×400 m relay |
World University Games
| Silver medal – second place | 2015 Gwangju | 4×400 m relay |
World Junior Championships
| Silver medal – second place | 2014 Eugene | 400 m |
| Silver medal – second place | 2014 Eugene | 4×400 m relay |

Nobuya Kato (加藤 修也, Katō Nobuya; born 16 April 1995) is a Japanese sprinter. He competed in the men's 4 × 400 metres relay at the 2016 Summer Olympics.

== Personal best ==
| Event | Time (s) | Competition | Venue | Date | Notes |
|---|---|---|---|---|---|
| 400 m | 45.69 | Ekopa Track Games | Fukuroi, Japan | 2 November 2013 | |

== International competition ==
| Year | Competition | Venue | Position | Event | Time | Notes |
Representing Japan
| 2014 | World Indoor Championships | Sopot, Poland | 10th (h) | 4×400 m relay | 3:12.63 (relay leg: 3rd) | SB |
| 2014 | World Junior Championships | Eugene, United States | 2nd | 400 m | 46.17 | SB |
| 2014 | World Junior Championships | Eugene, United States | 2nd | 4×400 m relay | 3:04.11 (relay leg: 4th) | AJR |
| 2014 | Asian Games | Incheon, South Korea | 5th | 400 m | 46.13 | |
| 2014 | Asian Games | Incheon, South Korea | 1st | 4×400 m relay | 3:01.88 (relay leg: 4th) | SB |
| 2015 | World University Games | Gwangju, South Korea | 2nd | 4×400 m relay | 3:07.75 (relay leg: 2nd) | |
| 2016 | Olympic Games | Rio de Janeiro, Brazil | 13th (h) | 4×400 m relay | 3:02.95 (relay leg: 4th) | |
