= Kaisei Yui =

Japanese sprinter

Personal information
- Nationality: Japanese
- Born: 6 February 1996 (age 30) Shizuoka Prefecture, Japan
- Education: Juntendo University
- Height: 1.77 m (5 ft 10 in)
- Weight: 68 kg (150 lb)

Sport
- Country: Japan
- Sport: Track and field
- Event: 400 metres

Achievements and titles
- Personal best: 400 m: 46.36 (2015)
Medal record
Men's athletics
Representing Japan
World Junior Championships
| Silver medal – second place | 2014 Eugene | 4×400 m relay |
World Youth Championships
| Bronze medal – third place | 2013 Donetsk | Medley relay |

Kaisei Yui (油井 快晴, Yui Kaisei; born 6 February 1996) is a Japanese track and field sprinter who specialized in the 400 metres. He competed in the 4 × 400 metres relay at the 2014 World Indoor Championships without qualifying for the final.

== Personal best ==
| Event | Time (s) | Competition | Venue | Date |
|---|---|---|---|---|
| 400 m | 46.36 | Japanese Championships | Niigata, Japan | 27 June 2015 |

== International competition ==
| Year | Competition | Venue | Position | Event | Time | Notes |
Representing Japan and Asia-Pacific (Continental Cup only)
| 2013 | World Youth Championships | Donetsk, Ukraine | 11th (sf) | 400 m | 47.23 | |
| 2013 | World Youth Championships | Donetsk, Ukraine | 3rd | Medley relay | 1:50.52 (relay leg: 4th) | NYB |
| 2014 | World Indoor Championships | Sopot, Poland | 10th (h) | 4×400 m relay | 3:12.63 (relay leg: 2nd) | SB |
| 2014 | World Relays | Nassau, Bahamas | 2nd (B) | 4×400 m relay | 3:03.24 (relay leg: 1st) | SB |
| 2014 | World Junior Championships | Eugene, United States | 7th | 400 m | 47.08 | |
| 2014 | World Junior Championships | Eugene, United States | 2nd | 4×400 m relay | 3:04.11 (relay leg: 2nd) | AJR |
| 2014 | Continental Cup | Marrakesh, Morocco | 4th | 4×400 m relay | 3:03.77 (relay leg: 3rd) | |

== National title ==
| Year | Competition | Venue | Event | Time |
Representing Juntendo University
| 2016 | National University Championships | Osaka, Osaka | 4×400 m relay | 3:06.79 (relay leg: 4th) |
