= Athletics at the 2016 Summer Olympics – Men's 400 metres =

Men's 400 metres at the Games of the XXXI Olympiad
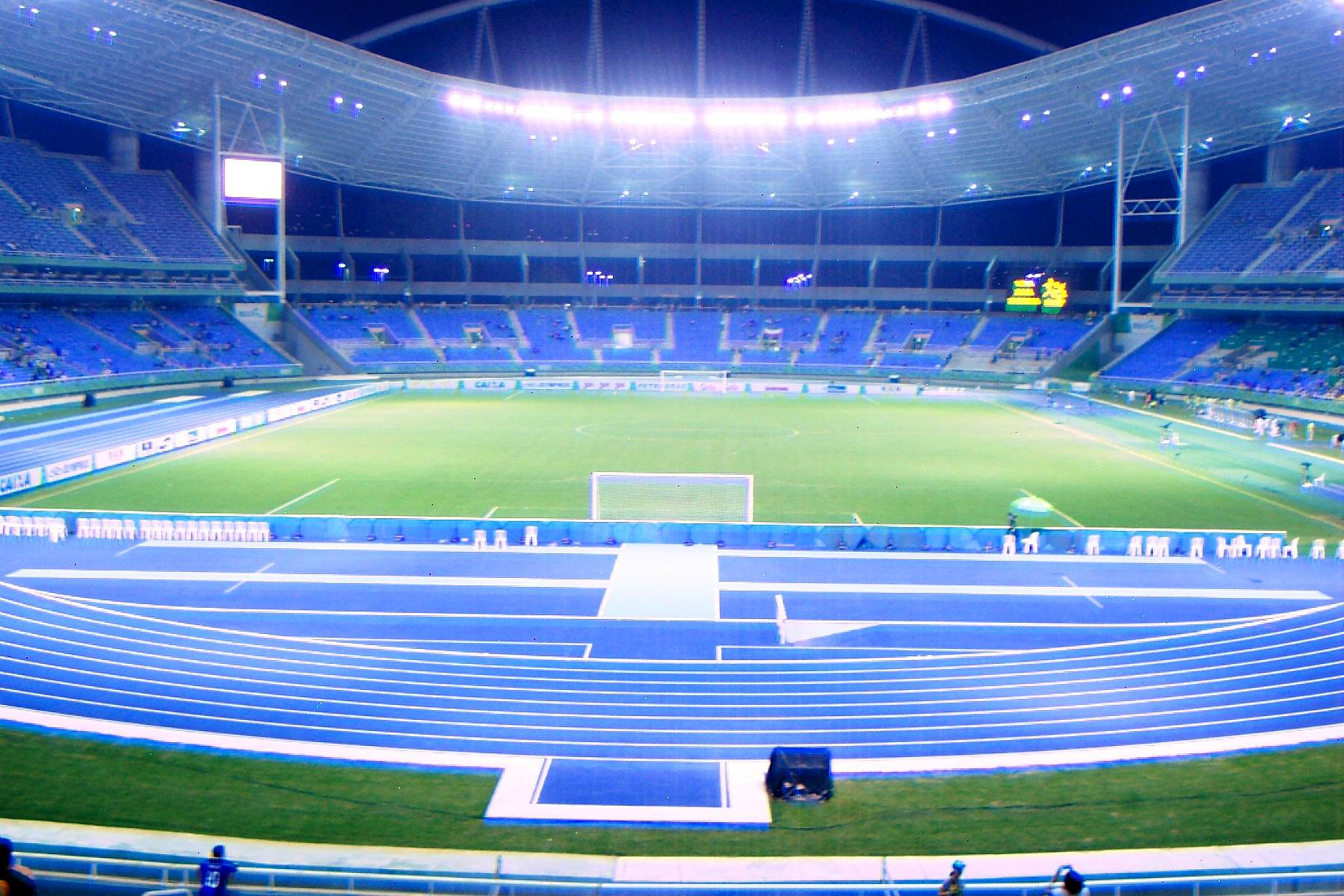
- Interior view of the Estádio Olímpico João Havelange, where the Men's 400m took place.
- Venue: Olympic Stadium
- Dates: 12 August 2016 (Heats); 13 August 2016 (semi-final); 14 August 2016 (final)
- Competitors: 53 from 35 nations
- Winning time: 43.03 WR

Medalists
1st place, gold medalist(s)		Wayde van Niekerk	South Africa
2nd place, silver medalist(s)		Kirani James	Grenada
3rd place, bronze medalist(s)		LaShawn Merritt	United States

Official Video Highlights

The men's 400 metres event at the 2016 Summer Olympics took place between 12 and 14 August at the Olympic Stadium. Fifty-three athletes from 35 nations competed. The event was won by 0.73 seconds by Wayde van Niekerk of South Africa, who broke the world record and won the nation's second gold medal in the men's 400 metres (after Bevil Rudd in 1920). Kirani James of Grenada and LaShawn Merritt of the United States became the sixth and seventh men to win two medals in the event, but Michael Johnson remained the only man with two gold medals.

== Summary ==
Kirani James was the Olympic champion in 2012 and was in good form before the competition with a run of 44.08 seconds placing him second on the global rankings. The 2008 Olympic champion LaShawn Merritt topped the lists for the season as the only man under 44 seconds. Wayde van Niekerk ranked third and was the 2015 World Championships winner. At that competition the trio had all run under 44 seconds for medals (a first for the sport) and were the principal challengers to the Olympic title. Two younger athletes, Baboloki Thebe and Machel Cedenio, were the next fastest athletes to enter. James was the fastest in the first round with 44.93 and Cedenio was the other heat winner under 45 seconds. The 2016 World Indoor Champion Pavel Maslák, David Verburg and Rafał Omelko qualified as fastest losers. Former European champions Martyn Rooney and Kevin Borlée were eliminated.

In the semi-finals, James had a season's best time of 44.02 to win the round nearly two tenths ahead of Merritt. Cedenio won the 2nd semi final ahead with van Niekerk second. Bralon Taplin won the third semi final. Fastest loser qualifiers Karabo Sibanda, Matthew Hudson-Smith and Ali Khamis all set personal bests.

In the final, the three favorites James, van Niekerk and Merritt led from the start. By the end of the turn, van Niekerk had a clear 2 metre lead, Merritt just slightly ahead of James who had closed the gap during the turn. Cedenio was another four metres back, with Taplin another metre back. In the home straight van Niekerk increased his lead while James overtook Merritt, finishing second and third. Cedenio was fourth, Taplin faded, and in lane 1, 18-year-old Karabo Sibanda finished fifth.

Van Niekerk set a new world record of 43.03 seconds, beating Michael Johnson’s previous record set at the 1999 World Championships by 0.15 seconds. Johnson was in the stadium, working in the British commentary booth. This was also the first time that the event has been won and the world record broken by a runner in lane 8.

Cedenio set the national record for Trinidad and Tobago and Ali Khamis in sixth set the national record for Bahrain.

== Background ==
This was the 28th appearance of the event, which is one of 12 athletics events to have been held at every Summer Olympics. The top six finishers from 2012 (in order: Kirani James of Grenada, Luguelín Santos of the Dominican Republic, Lalonde Gordon of Trinidad and Tobago, Chris Brown of the Bahamas, and Kevin Borlée and Jonathan Borlée of Belgium) returned. LaShawn Merritt of the United States, 2008 gold medalist who was injured and could not finish his heat in 2012, also returned. A new challenger was Wayde van Niekerk of South Africa. James (2011), Merritt (2013), and van Niekerk (2015) were the latest three world champions.

Bahrain and Niger appeared in this event for the first time. Also competing was one member of the Refugee Olympic Team. The United States made its 27th appearance, most of any nation, having missed only the boycotted 1980 Games.

== Qualification ==
A National Olympic Committee (NOC) could enter up to 3 qualified athletes in the men's 400 metres event if all athletes meet the entry standard during the qualifying period. (The limit of 3 has been in place since the 1930 Olympic Congress.) The qualifying standard was 45.40 seconds. The qualifying period was from 1 May 2015 to 11 July 2016. The qualifying time standards could be obtained in various meets during the given period that have the approval of the IAAF. Indoor and outdoor meets were accepted. NOCs could also use their universality place—each NOC could enter one male athlete regardless of time if they had no male athletes meeting the entry standard for an athletics event—in the 400 metres.

== Competition format ==
The competition used the three-round format introduced in 2004. The "fastest loser" system, introduced in 1964, was used for the first round and semifinals. There were 7 first-round heats, each with 7 or 8 runners. The top three runners in each heat advanced, along with the next three fastest overall. The 24 semifinalists were divided into 3 heats of 8 runners each. The top two runners in each semifinal heat and the next two fastest overall advanced, making an eight-man final.

== Records ==
Prior to this competition, the existing global and area records were as follows:

World record	Michael Johnson (USA)	43.18	Seville, Spain	26 August 1999
Olympic record	Michael Johnson (USA)	43.49	Atlanta, United States	29 July 1996
World Leading	LaShawn Merritt (USA)	43.97	Eugene, Oregon, United States	3 July 2016

Area
Area	Time (s)	Athlete	Nation
Africa (records)	43.48	Wayde van Niekerk	South Africa
Asia (records)	43.93	Yousef Ahmed Masrahi	Saudi Arabia
Europe (records)	44.33	Thomas Schönlebe	East Germany
North, Central America and Caribbean (records)	43.18	Michael Johnson	United States
Oceania (records)	44.38	Darren Clark	Australia
South America (records)	44.29	Sanderlei Parrela	Brazil

The following new world, Olympic and African record were established during this competition:

Date	Round	Athlete	Time	Notes
14 August	Final	Wayde Van Niekerk (RSA)	43.03	WR, OR, AR

The following national records were established during the competition:

Country	Athlete	Round	Time	Notes
Slovenia	Luka Janežič (SLO)	Semifinals	45.07	
Bahrain	Ali Khamis (BRN)	Semifinals	44.49	
South Africa	Wayde van Niekerk (RSA)	Final	43.03	WR, OR, AR
Trinidad and Tobago	Machel Cedenio (TTO)	Final	44.01	
Bahrain	Ali Khamis (BRN)	Final	44.36	

== Schedule ==
All times are Brasília Standard Time (UTC-3)

Date	Time	Round
Friday, 12 August 2016	21:00	Round 1
Saturday, 13 August 2016	20:30	Semifinals
Sunday, 14 August 2016	22:00	Final

== Results ==
=== Round 1 ===
Qualification rule: first 3 of each heat (Q) plus the 3 fastest times (q) qualified.

==== Heat 1 ====
Rank	Lane	Athlete	Nation	Reaction	Time	Notes
1	2	Machel Cedenio	Trinidad and Tobago	0.179	44.98	Q
2	7	Gil Roberts	United States	0.168	45.27	Q
3	4	Yoandys Lescay	Cuba	0.199	45.36	Q, SB
4	6	Fitzroy Dunkley	Jamaica	0.176	45.66	
5	3	Kevin Borlée	Belgium	0.138	45.90	
6	5	Alberth Bravo	Venezuela	0.205	46.15	
7	1	Alex Lerionka Sampao	Kenya	0.199	46.62	
8	8	Ousseini Djibo Idrissa	Niger	0.173	50.06	

==== Heat 2 ====
Rank	Lane	Athlete	Nation	Reaction	Time	Notes
1	4	Bralon Taplin	Grenada	0.162	45.15	Q
2	2	Nery Brenes	Costa Rica	0.151	45.53	Q
3	7	Karabo Sibanda	Botswana	0.166	45.56	Q
4	1	Matteo Galvan	Italy	0.154	46.07	
5	3	Raymond Kibet	Kenya	0.234	46.15	
6	6	Mehboob Ali	Pakistan	0.212	48.37	
7	8	Bachir Mahamat	Chad	0.188	48.59	
–	5	Anas Beshr	Egypt	0.141	DQ	R163.3a

==== Heat 3 ====
Rank	Lane	Athlete	Nation	Reaction	Time	Notes
1	7	Wayde van Niekerk	South Africa	0.147	45.26	Q
2	2	Luguelín Santos	Dominican Republic	0.148	45.61	Q
3	8	Javon Francis	Jamaica	0.172	45.88	Q
4	6	Jonathan Borlée	Belgium	0.162	46.01	
5	3	Alphas Kishoyian	Kenya	0.147	46.74	
6	5	Brandon Valentine-Parris	Saint Vincent and the Grenadines	0.144	47.62	
–	4	Alonzo Russell	Bahamas	0.159	DQ	R163.3a

==== Heat 4 ====
Rank	Lane	Athlete	Nation	Reaction	Time	Notes
1	5	Lalonde Gordon	Trinidad and Tobago	0.153	45.24	Q
2	4	Luka Janežič	Slovenia	0.148	45.33	Q
3	6	Baboloki Thebe	Botswana	0.155	45.41	Q
4	1	Chris Brown	Bahamas	0.147	45.56	SB
5	2	Martyn Rooney	Great Britain	0.154	45.60	
6	7	Julian Jrummi Walsh	Japan	0.149	46.37	
7	8	Gustavo Cuesta	Dominican Republic	0.143	46.92	
8	3	James Chiengjiek	Refugee Olympic Team	0.213	52.89	

==== Heat 5 ====
Rank	Lane	Athlete	Nation	Reaction	Time	Notes
1	8	LaShawn Merritt	United States	0.235	45.28	Q
2	3	Abdelalelah Haroun	Qatar	0.190	45.76	Q
3	6	Isaac Makwala	Botswana	0.242	45.91	Q
4	2	Vitaliy Butrym	Ukraine	0.166	45.92	
5	4	Donald Blair-Sanford	Israel	0.163	46.06	
6	5	Deon Lendore	Trinidad and Tobago	0.201	46.15	
7	7	Hederson Estefani	Brazil	0.234	46.68	

==== Heat 6 ====
Rank	Lane	Athlete	Nation	Reaction	Time	Notes
1	6	Kirani James	Grenada	0.156	44.93	Q
2	5	Rusheen McDonald	Jamaica	0.179	45.22	Q, SB
3	2	Matthew Hudson-Smith	Great Britain	0.142	45.26	Q
4	3	David Verburg	United States	0.167	45.48	q
5	7	Winston George	Guyana	0.186	45.77	
6	8	Diego Palomeque	Colombia	0.159	46.48	
–	4	Abbas Abubakar Abbas	Bahrain	0.192	DQ	R163.3a

==== Heat 7 ====
Rank	Lane	Athlete	Nation	Reaction	Time	Notes
1	7	Ali Khamis	Bahrain	0.161	45.12	Q
2	1	Steven Gardiner	Bahamas	0.149	45.24	Q
3	8	Liemarvin Bonevacia	Netherlands	0.142	45.49	Q
4	5	Rafał Omelko	Poland	0.177	45.54	q
5	4	Pavel Maslák	Czech Republic	0.183	45.54	q
6	6	Mohammad Anas	India	0.158	45.95	
7	2	Orukpe Erayokan	Nigeria	0.180	47.42	SB
8	3	Yuzo Kanemaru	Japan	0.144	48.38	

=== Semifinals ===
==== Semifinal 1 ====
Rank	Lane	Athlete	Nation	Reaction	Time	Notes
1	4	Kirani James	Grenada	0.144	44.02	Q, SB
2	6	LaShawn Merritt	United States	0.271	44.21	Q
3	2	Karabo Sibanda	Botswana	0.174	44.47	q, PB
4	7	Luguelín Santos	Dominican Republic	0.155	44.71	SB
5	1	Javon Francis	Jamaica	0.170	44.96	
6	5	Nery Brenes	Costa Rica	0.181	45.02	
7	8	Liemarvin Bonevacia	Netherlands	0.166	45.03	SB
8	3	Lalonde Gordon	Trinidad and Tobago	0.157	45.13	

==== Semifinal 2 ====
Rank	Lane	Athlete	Nation	Reaction	Time	Notes
1	5	Machel Cedenio	Trinidad and Tobago	0.243	44.39	Q
2	3	Wayde van Niekerk	South Africa	0.156	44.45	Q
3	2	Pavel Maslák	Czech Republic	0.185	45.06	SB
4	6	Luka Janežič	Slovenia	0.154	45.07	NR
5	1	David Verburg	United States	0.159	45.61	
6	4	Rusheen McDonald	Jamaica	0.182	46.12	
7	7	Abdelalelah Haroun	Qatar	0.173	46.66	
—	8	Baboloki Thebe	Botswana	—	DNS	

==== Semifinal 3 ====
Rank	Lane	Athlete	Nation	Reaction	Time	Notes
1	6	Bralon Taplin	Grenada	0.171	44.44	Q
2	8	Matthew Hudson-Smith	Great Britain	0.143	44.48	Q, PB
3	3	Ali Khamis	Bahrain	0.145	44.49	q, NR
4	4	Gil Roberts	United States	0.151	44.65	SB
5	5	Steven Gardiner	Bahamas	0.156	44.72	
6	7	Yoandys Lescay	Cuba	0.216	45.00	PB
7	2	Rafał Omelko	Poland	0.164	45.28	
8	1	Isaac Makwala	Botswana	0.173	46.60	

=== Final ===
Rank	Lane	Athlete	Nation	Reaction	Time	Notes
1st place, gold medalist(s)	8	Wayde van Niekerk	South Africa	0.181	43.03	WR
2nd place, silver medalist(s)	6	Kirani James	Grenada	0.134	43.76	SB
3rd place, bronze medalist(s)	5	LaShawn Merritt	United States	0.204	43.85	SB
4	3	Machel Cedenio	Trinidad and Tobago	0.203	44.01	NR
5	1	Karabo Sibanda	Botswana	0.164	44.25	PB
6	2	Ali Khamis	Bahrain	0.148	44.36	NR
7	4	Bralon Taplin	Grenada	0.181	44.45	
8	7	Matthew Hudson-Smith	Great Britain	0.138	44.61	
