= Athletics at the 2014 Summer Youth Olympics – Boys' 400 metres =

Athletics – Boys' 400 metres at the II Summer Youth Olympic Games
- Venue: Nanjing Olympic Sports Centre
- Date: August 20–23
- Competitors: 21 from 21 nations

Medalists
1st place, gold medalist(s)		Martin Manley	Jamaica
2nd place, silver medalist(s)		Karabo Sibanda	Botswana
3rd place, bronze medalist(s)		Henri Delauze	Bahamas

The boys’ 400 m competition at the 2014 Summer Youth Olympics was held on 20–23 August 2014 in Nanjing Olympic Sports Center.

== Schedule ==
Date	Time	Round
20 August 2014	20:45	Heats
23 August 2014	10:06	Final

== Results ==
=== Heats ===
Eight fastest athletes advanced to Final A, the others advanced to Final B, or C according to their times.

Rank	Heat	Lane	Athlete	Result	Notes	Q
1	1	8	Martin Manley (JAM)	47.14		FA
2	1	6	Benjamin Lobo Vedel (DEN)	47.27		FA
3	2	4	Gemechu Alemu (ETH)	47.42	PB	FA
4	3	2	Karabo Sibanda (BOT)	47.43		FA
5	2	2	Henri Delauze (BAH)	47.44		FA
6	3	4	Ian Mutuku (KEN)	47.56		FA
7	3	7	Anderson Cerqueira (BRA)	48.07		FA
8	1	4	Jesús Serrano (ESP)	48.13		FA
9	3	6	Michael Mullett (AUS)	48.24		FB
10	3	8	Ezequiel Suarez (PUR)	48.53	PB	FB
11	2	8	Kashief King (TTO)	48.66		FB
12	2	7	Vitsanu Phosri (THA)	48.96		FB
13	1	2	Andrew James (USA)	49.06		FB
14	1	3	Choi Mingi (KOR)	49.30		FB
15	1	7	Jason Yaw (GUY)	49.41		FB
16	3	3	Pawel Chmiel (POL)	49.42		FC
17	2	3	Chou Tzu-yao (TPE)	50.01		FC
18	1	5	Mohammadreza Rahmani (IRI)	50.37		FC
19	3	5	Dicki-Terry Mael (VAN)	50.40	PB	FC
20	2	5	Harold Maturana (COL)	51.35		FC
21	2	6	Malolefoua Posini (SAM)	52.55		FC

=== Finals ===
==== Final A ====
Rank	Final Placing	Lane	Athlete	Result	Notes
1st place, gold medalist(s)	1	4	Martin Manley (JAM)	46.31	
2nd place, silver medalist(s)	2	5	Karabo Sibanda (BOT)	46.76	PB
3rd place, bronze medalist(s)	3	9	Henri Delauze (BAH)	46.91	PB
4	4	8	Ian Mutuku (KEN)	47.08	
5	5	6	Benjamin Lobo Vedel (DEN)	47.29	
6	6	7	Gemechu Alemu (ETH)	47.66	
7	7	2	Anderson Cerqueira (BRA)	47.81	
8	8	3	Jesús Serrano (ESP)	48.61	

==== Final B ====
Rank	Final Placing	Lane	Athlete	Result	Notes
1	9	2	Jason Yaw (GUY)	47.47	
2	10	3	Michael Mullett (AUS)	47.84	
3	11	4	Kashief King (TTO)	47.94	PB
4	12	6	Vitsanu Phosri (THA)	48.87	
5	13	5	Ezequiel Suarez (PUR)	49.27	
6	14	8	Choi Mingi (KOR)	50.40	
		7	Andrew James (USA)	DNS	

==== Final C ====
Rank	Final Placing	Lane	Athlete	Result	Notes
1	15	7	Mohammadreza Rahmani (IRI)	49.80	
2	16	4	Chou Tzu-yao (TPE)	49.89	
3	17	3	Harold Maturana (COL)	50.30	PB
4	18	8	Malolefoua Posini (SAM)	52.23	
		5	Pawel Chmiel (POL)	DNS	
		6	Dicki-Terry Mael (VAN)	DNS	
