= Brandon Valentine-Parris =

Vincentian sprinter (born 1995)

Personal information
- Born: 17 April 1995 (age 31)

Sport
- Country: Saint Vincent and the Grenadines
- Sport: Athletics

Brandon Valentine-Parris (born 17 April 1995) is a Vincentian sprinter. He competed in the men's 400 metres at the 2016 Summer Olympics.

== International competitions ==
| Year | Competition | Venue | Position | Event | Notes |
Representing Saint Vincent and the Grenadines
| 2011 | CARIFTA Games (U17) | Montego Bay, Jamaica | 4th | 800 m | 1:57.17 |
| 2011 | World Youth Championships | Lille, France | 52nd (h) | 800 m | 1:59.48 |
| 2012 | Central American and Caribbean; Junior Championships (U20) | San Salvador, El Salvador | 6th | 400 m | 48.89 |
| 2012 | Central American and Caribbean; Junior Championships (U20) | San Salvador, El Salvador | 3rd (h) | 800 m | 1:56.59^{1} |
| 2012 | World Junior Championships | Barcelona, Spain | 52nd (h) | 400 m | 48.93 |
| 2013 | CARIFTA Games (U20) | Nassau, The Bahamas | 8th | 400 m | 48.89 |
| 2013 | CARIFTA Games (U20) | Nassau, The Bahamas | 5th | 800 m | 1:55.02 |
| 2013 | Pan American Junior Championships | Medellín, Colombia | 11th (h) | 400 m | 48.90 |
| 2013 | Pan American Junior Championships | Medellín, Colombia | 13th (h) | 800 m | 2:06.23 |
| 2014 | CARIFTA Games (U20) | Fort-de-France, Martinique | 8th | 400 m | 49.43 |
| 2014 | World Junior Championships | Eugene, United States | 37th (h) | 400 m | 48.36 |
| 2014 | Commonwealth Games | Glasgow, United Kingdom | 44th (h) | 400 m | 50.90 |
| 2015 | NACAC Championships | San José, Costa Rica | 14th (h) | 400 m | 46.38 |
| 2016 | NACAC U23 Championships | San Salvador, El Salvador | 11th (h) | 200 m | 21.36 |
| 2016 | NACAC U23 Championships | San Salvador, El Salvador | 8th (h) | 400 m | 47.04 |
| 2016 | Olympic Games | Rio de Janeiro, Brazil | 45th (h) | 400 m | 47.62 |
| 2019 | Pan American Games | Lima, Peru | 13th (h) | 200 m | 21.47 |
| 2019 | World Championships | Doha, Qatar | 34th (h) | 400 m | 47.39 |
| 2025 | NACAC Championships | Freeport, Bahamas | 16th (h) | 400 m | 47.60 |

^{1}Did not finish in the final
