= Jamal Walton =

Caymanian sprinter

Personal information
- Born: November 25, 1998 (age 26) United States
- Education: Miramar High School

Sport
- Sport: Track and field
- Event: 400 meters
- Coached by: Chris McComb

Jamal Walton (born November 25, 1998) is a Caymanian sprinter specializing in the 400 meters as well as an American football player. He represented his country at the 2017 World Championships reaching the semifinals. In addition, he won the gold medal at the 2017 Pan American U20 Championships with a new Championships record and national record of 44.99.

Born in the United States, he has a dual citizenship with the Cayman Islands where his father comes from.

== International competitions ==
Year	Competition	Venue	Position	Event	Notes
Representing the Cayman Islands
2013	CARIFTA Games (U18)	Nassau, Bahamas	8th	200 m	22.52 (w)
2013	CARIFTA Games (U18)	Nassau, Bahamas	4th	400 m	49.08
2014	CARIFTA Games (U18)	Fort-de-France, Martinique	4th	200 m	21.64 (w)
2014	CARIFTA Games (U18)	Fort-de-France, Martinique	3rd	400 m	47.74
2014	Central American and Caribbean; Junior Championships (U18)	Morelia, Mexico	12th (h)	200 m	22.38
2014	Central American and Caribbean; Junior Championships (U18)	Morelia, Mexico	1st	400 m	47.01
2014	World Junior Championships	Eugene, United States	17th (h)	400 m	47.22^{1}
2015	CARIFTA Games (U18)	Basseterre, Saint Kitts and Nevis	5th	200 m	21.43
2015	CARIFTA Games (U18)	Basseterre, Saint Kitts and Nevis	4th	400 m	47.43
2015	IAAF World Relays	Nassau, Bahamas	–	4 × 200 m relay	DNF
2015	World Youth Championships	Cali, Colombia	4th	400 m	45.99
2015	Pan American Junior Championships	Edmonton, Canada	1st	400 m	46.09
2015	Commonwealth Youth Games	Apia, Samoa	2nd	400 m	46.46
2016	CARIFTA Games (U20)	St. George's, Grenada	7th	200 m	21.42 (w)
2016	CARIFTA Games (U20)	St. George's, Grenada	2nd	400 m	46.23
2016	World U20 Championships	Bydgoszcz, Poland	10th (sf)	400 m	46.61
2017	CARIFTA Games (U20)	Willemstad, Curaçao	1st	200 m	21.29
2017	CARIFTA Games (U20)	Willemstad, Curaçao	2nd	400 m	46.46
2017	Pan American U20 Championships	Trujillo, Peru	4th (h)	200 m	21.39^{2}
2017	Pan American U20 Championships	Trujillo, Peru	1st	400 m	44.99
2017	World Championships	London, United Kingdom	13th (sf)	400 m	45.16

^{1}Did not finish in the semifinals

^{2}Did not start in the final

== Personal bests ==
Outdoor

- 100 meters – 10.57 (+2.0 m/s, Gainesville 2017)
- 200 meters – 20.57 (+2.0 m/s, Miramar 2017)
- 400 meters – 44.99 (Trujillo 2017)
