= Josephus Lyles =

American sprinter (born 1998)

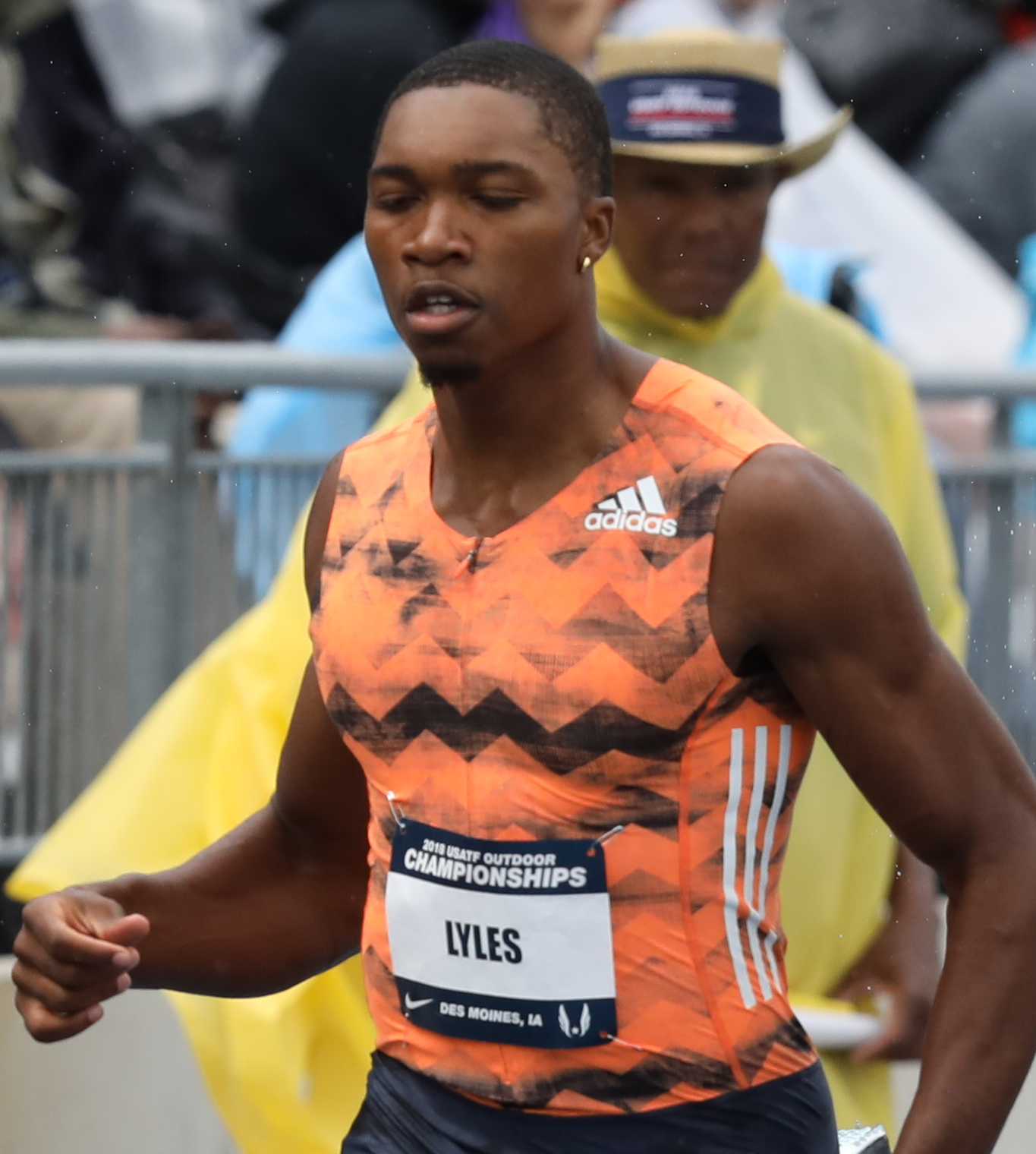
- Lyles in 2018

Personal information
- Nationality: United States
- Born: July 22, 1998 (age 28) Gainesville, Florida, U.S.
- Home town: Alexandria, Virginia, U.S.
- Height: 6 ft 2 in (188 cm)
- Weight: 185 lb (84 kg)

Sport
- Sport: Running
- Events: 100 metres, 200 metres, 400 metres

Achievements and titles
- Personal bests: 100 m: 10.03 (Memphis, TN 2022); 200 m: 19.93 (Eugene, OR 2022); 400 m: 45.09 (Clermont, FL 2018)
Medal record
Men's athletics
Representing the United States
NACAC Championships
Bronze medal – third place	2022 Freeport	200 m
World Junior Championships
Gold medal – first place	2014 Eugene	4×400 m relay
World Youth Championships
Silver medal – second place	2015 Cali	400 m
Bronze medal – third place	2015 Cali	200 m

Josephus Lyles (born July 22, 1998) is an American sprinter. He attended T. C. Williams High School in Alexandria, Virginia. His personal best of 19.93 in the 200 metres puts him in the top 100 of all time in the event.

In July 2016, Josephus and his older brother Noah turned professional and signed with Adidas.

His parents Keisha Caine and Kevin Lyles competed in Track and Field at Seton Hall University.
