= Gavin Mogopa =

Botswana judoka

Personal information
- Nationality: Botswana
- Born: 2 April 1996 (age 30)

Sport
- Sport: Judo

Gavin Mogopa (born 2 April 1996) is a Botswana judoka. He competed at the 2016 Summer Olympics in Rio de Janeiro, in the men's 60 kg, where he was defeated by Pavel Petřikov in the second round.

In 2014, he competed in the boys' 55 kg event at the 2014 Summer Youth Olympics held in Nanjing, China. He lost his bronze medal match against Jorre Verstraeten of Belgium.
