= Martin Manley (athlete) =

Jamaican sprinter (born 1997)

Personal information
- Born: March 10, 1997 (age 29)
Medal record
Athletics
Representing Jamaica
IAAF World Relays
Bronze medal – third place	2017 Nassau	4x400 m relay
NACAC U23 Championships
Silver medal – second place	2016 San Salvador	4×400 m relay
Summer Youth Olympics
Gold medal – first place	2014 Nanjing	400m
World Junior Championships
Bronze medal – third place	2014 Oregon	4×400 m relay
World Youth Championships
Gold medal – first place	Donetsk 2013	400 m
Gold medal – first place	Donetsk 2013	Medley relay
CARIFTA Games (U17)
Gold medal – first place	2013 Nassau	200 m
Gold medal – first place	2013 Nassau	400 m
Gold medal – first place	2014 Fort-de-France	400 m
Gold medal – first place	2014 Fort-de-France	4 x 400 m relay
Bronze medal – third place	2013 Nassau	4 × 400 m relay

Martin Manley (born March 10, 1997) is a male sprinter from Jamaica, who mainly competed in the 200m and 400m. He attended St Jago High School in Spanish Town, Jamaica.

Manley was a part of the 4 × 400 m Relay team that won bronze at the 2017 IAAF World Relays in Nassau, Bahamas.

== Personal bests ==
Event	Time (seconds)	Venue	Date
100m	10.38 (+1.3)	Kingston, Jamaica	28 MAR 2014
200m	20.57 (+1.4)	Kingston, Jamaica	27 MAR 2014
400m	45.89	Donetsk, Ukraine	12 JUL 2013
