= Karabo Sibanda =

Botswana sprinter

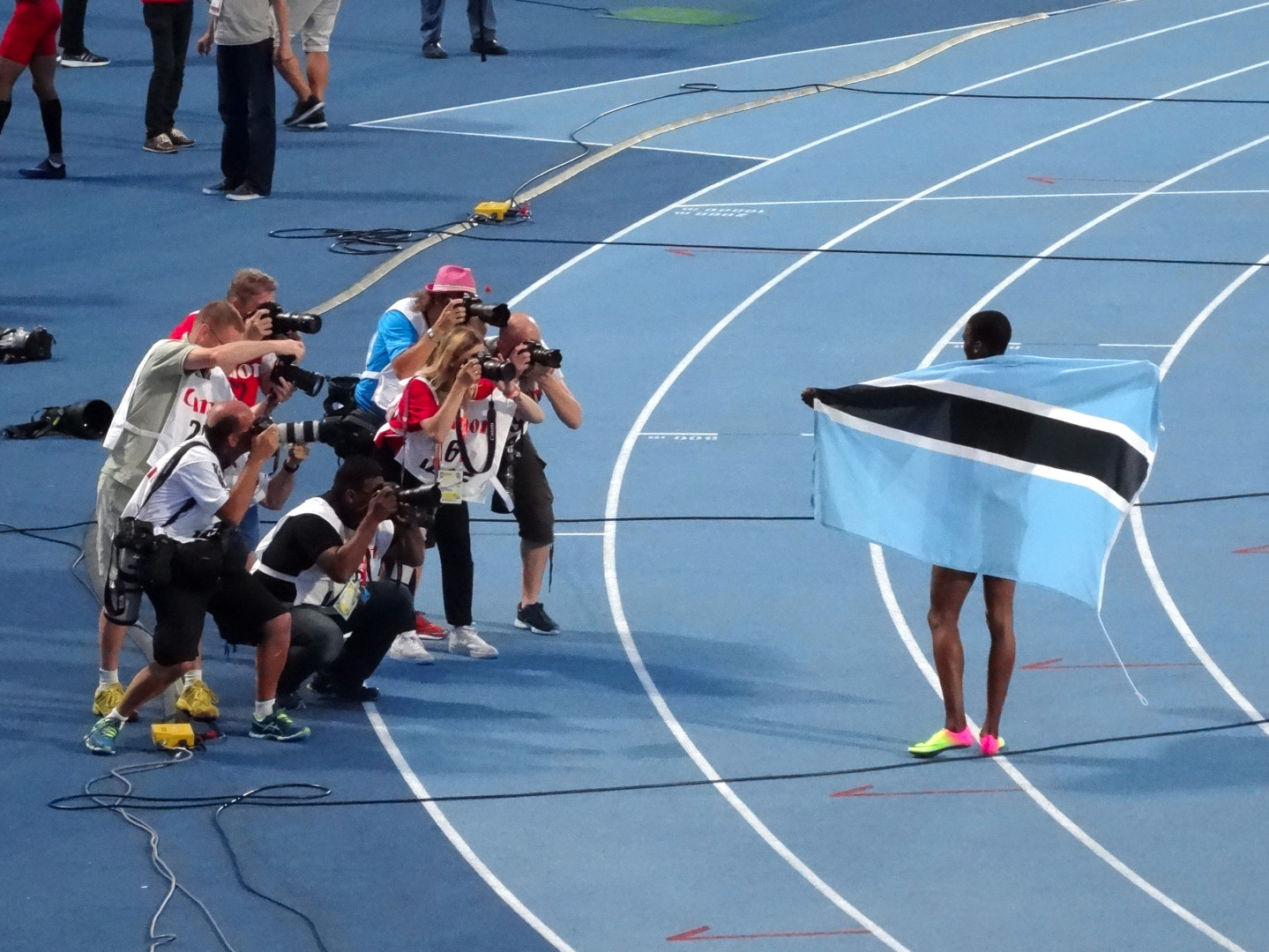
- 2016 IAAF World U20 Championships

Personal information
- Born: 2 July 1998 (age 28)

Sport
- Country: Botswana
- Sport: Athletics
- Event: 400 m
Medal record
Men's athletics
Representing Botswana
African Championships
Gold medal – first place	2016 Durban	4×400 m
Silver medal – second place	2016 Durban	400 m
Summer Youth Olympics
Silver medal – second place	2014 Nanjing	400 m

Karabo Sibanda (born 2 July 1998) is a sprinter from Botswana specialising in the 400 metres. Originally a junior chess player, after he saw Usain Bolt competing at the 2012 London Olympic Games he got so inspired by his performance, that he decided to be an athlete. He won two medals at the 2016 African Championships as well as multiple age group medals. He competed at the 2016 Summer Olympics, finishing fifth in the 400 metres final as barely an 18 year old in a still personal best of 44.25.

== International competitions ==
Year	Competition	Venue	Position	Event	Notes
Representing Botswana
2014	African Youth Games	Gaborone, Botswana	1st	400 m	46.77
2014	World Junior Championships	Eugene, United States	22nd (sf)	400 m	48.30
2014	World Junior Championships	Eugene, United States	5th (h)	4×400 m relay	3:07.80^{‡}
2014	Youth Olympic Games	Nanjing, China	2nd	400 m	46.76
2015	African Junior Championships	Addis Ababa, Ethiopia	1st	400 m	46.33
2015	African Junior Championships	Addis Ababa, Ethiopia	1st	4×400 m relay	3:11.00
2015	African Youth Championships	Réduit, Mauritius	1st	400 m	47.40
2015	African Youth Championships	Réduit, Mauritius	2nd	Medley relay	1:54.10
2015	World Youth Championships	Cali, Colombia	5th	400 m	46.03
2015	Commonwealth Youth Games	Apia, Samoa	1st	400 m	45.83
2015	Commonwealth Youth Games	Apia, Samoa	1st	4×100 m relay	41.94
2016	African Championships	Durban, South Africa	2nd	400 m	45.42
2016	African Championships	Durban, South Africa	1st	4×400 m relay	3:02.20
2016	World U20 Championships	Bydgoszcz, Poland	3rd	400 m	45.45
2016	World U20 Championships	Bydgoszcz, Poland	2nd	4×400 m relay	3:02:81
2016	Olympic Games	Rio de Janeiro, Brazil	5th	400 m	44.25
2016	Olympic Games	Rio de Janeiro, Brazil	5th	4×400 m relay	2:59.06
2017	IAAF World Relays	Nassau, Bahamas	2nd	4×400 m relay	3:02.28
2017	World Championships	London, United Kingdom	46th (h)	400 m	47.44
2017	World Championships	London, United Kingdom	14th (h)	4×400 m relay	3:06.50
2018	Commonwealth Games	Gold Coast, Australia	12th (sf)	400 m	46.26

^{‡}Disqualified in the final

== Personal bests ==
Outdoor

- 200 metres – 21.28 (+1.0 m/s, Potchefstroom 2016)
- 400 metres – 44.25 ( 2016 Rio de Janeiro Summer Olympics)
