= Nathon Allen =

Jamaican track and field athlete

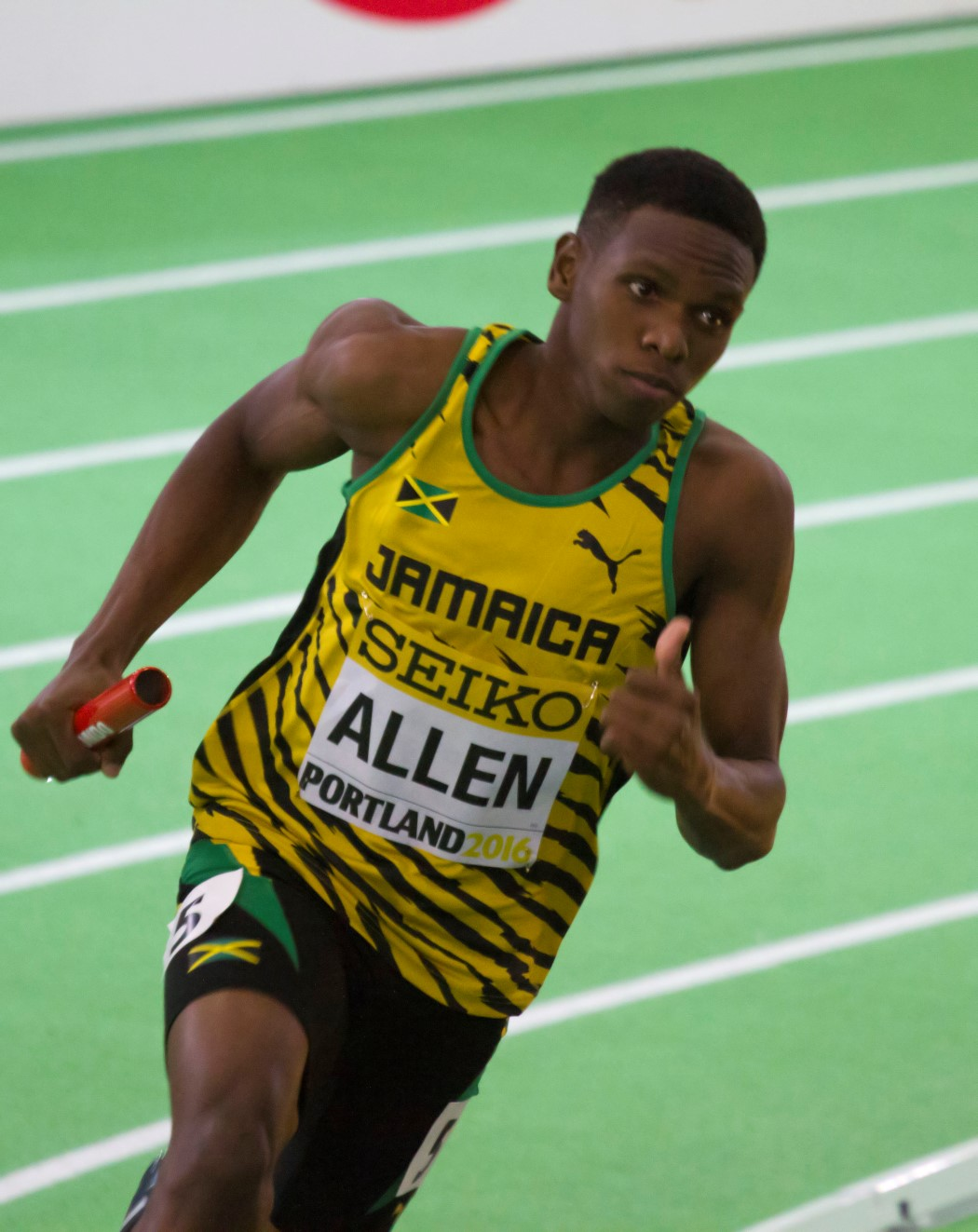
- Allen in 2016

Personal information
- Born: 28 October 1995 (age 30) Bethany, Jamaica

Sport
- Country: Jamaica
- Sport: Track and field
- Event: Sprinting
- College team: Auburn Tigers
Medal record
Men's track and field
Representing Jamaica
Olympic Games
Silver medal – second place	2016 Rio de Janeiro	4 × 400 m relay
World Championships
Silver medal – second place	2019 Doha	4 × 400 m relay
Silver medal – second place	2019 Doha	4 × 400 m mixed
Silver medal – second place	2022 Eugene	4 × 400 m relay
NACAC Championships
Silver medal – second place	2022 Freeport	400 m
NACAC U23 Championships
Gold medal – first place	2016 San Salvador	400 m
Silver medal – second place	2016 San Salvador	4 × 100 m relay
Silver medal – second place	2016 San Salvador	4 × 400 m relay

Nathon Allen (born 28 October 1995) is a Jamaican track and field athlete who competes in sprinting events. Allen of St. Jago High School and Twayne Crooks of Kingston College are the two school boys named to represent Jamaica at second staging of the World Relays in Nassau. He won an Olympic silver medal as a member of the Jamaican 4 × 400 m relay team.

Allen ran for Auburn University, under coach Henry Rolle. He was also an individual finalist in the 400 meters at the 2017 World Championships, finishing fifth.

== Personal bests ==
Event	Time (sec)	Venue	Date
100 m	11.04	Kingston (JAM)	29 March 2012
100 m	10.60	Kingston (JAM)	14 February 2015
200 m	20.70	Kingston (JAM)	16 April 2016
400 m	44.13	Eugene, OR (USA)	8 June 2018
4 × 100 m	39.89	Philadelphia(USA)	25 April 2015
4 × 400 m	3:02.98	Nassau (BAH)	2 May 2015
4 × 400 m	2:58.16	Rio de Janeiro (BRA)	20 August 2016
