= Wiktor Suwara =

Polish sprinter (born 1996)

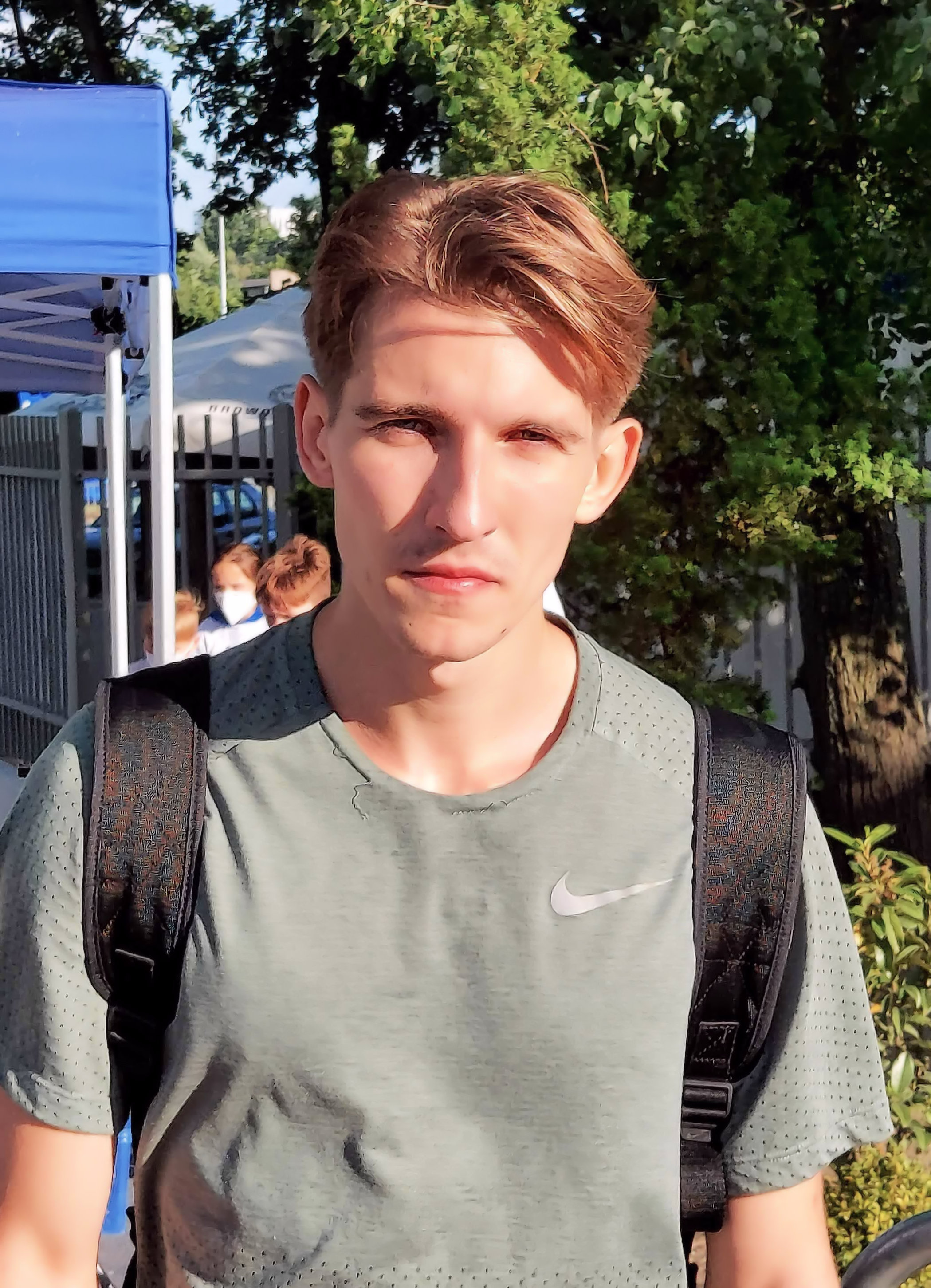
- Wiktor Suwara in 2021

Personal information
- Nationality: Polish
- Born: 24 July 1996 (age 29) Łodź, Poland

Sport
- Sport: Athletics
- Event: Sprinting
Medal record
Men's athletics
Representing Poland
European Team Championships
Bronze medal – third place	2021 Chorzów	4×400 m

Wiktor Suwara (born 24 July 1996) is a Polish athlete. He competed in the mixed 4 × 400 metres relay event at the 2019 World Athletics Championships.
