= United States at the 2017 World Championships in Athletics =

- Flag of the United States
- WA code: USA
- National federation: USA Track & Field
- Website: usatf.org

in London, United Kingdom 4–13 August 2017
- Competitors: 136 in 46 events
- Medals Ranked 1st: Gold 10 Silver 11 Bronze 9 Total 30

World Championships in Athletics appearances (overview)
- 1976; 1980; 1983; 1987; 1991; 1993; 1995; 1997; 1999; 2001; 2003; 2005; 2007; 2009; 2011; 2013; 2015; 2017; 2019; 2022; 2023; 2025

The United States competed at the 2017 World Championships in Athletics in London, United Kingdom, from 4–13 August 2017.

== Medalists ==
Medal	Athlete	Event	Date
Gold	Justin Gatlin	Men's 100 m	August 5
Gold	Tori Bowie	Women's 100 m	August 6
Gold	Sam Kendricks	Men's pole vault	August 8
Gold	Phyllis Francis	Women's 400 m	August 9
Gold	Kori Carter	Women's 400 m hurdles	August 10
Gold	Christian Taylor	Men's triple jump	August 10
Gold	Brittney Reese	Women's long jump	August 11
Gold	Emma Coburn	Women's 3000 m steeplechase	August 11
Gold	Aaliyah Brown; Allyson Felix; Morolake Akinosun; Tori Bowie; Ariana Washington*	Women's 4 × 100 m relay	August 12
Gold	Quanera Hayes; Allyson Felix; Shakima Wimbley; Phyllis Francis; Kendall Ellis*; Natasha Hastings*	Women's 4 × 400 m relay	August 13
Silver	Jarrion Lawson	Men's long jump	August 5
Silver	Christian Coleman	Men's 100 m	August 5
Silver	Sandi Morris	Women's pole vault	August 6
Silver	Joe Kovacs	Men's shot put	August 6
Silver	Jennifer Simpson	Women's 1500 m	August 7
Silver	Dalilah Muhammad	Women's 400 m hurdles	August 10
Silver	Will Claye	Men's triple jump	August 10
Silver	Courtney Frerichs	Women's 3000 m steeplechase	August 11
Silver	Dawn Harper-Nelson	Women's 100 m hurdles	August 12
Silver	Mike Rodgers; Justin Gatlin; Jaylen Bacon; Christian Coleman; BeeJay Lee*	Men's 4 × 100 m relay	August 12
Silver	Wil London III; Gil Roberts; Michael Cherry; Fred Kerley; Bryshon Nellum*; Tony McQuay*	Men's 4 × 400 m relay	August 13
Bronze	Mason Finley	Men's discus throw	August 5
Bronze	Amy Cragg	Women's marathon	August 6
Bronze	Evan Jager	Men's 3000 m steeplechase	August 8
Bronze	Michelle Carter	Women's shot put	August 9
Bronze	Kerron Clement	Men's 400 m hurdles	August 9
Bronze	Allyson Felix	Women's 400 m	August 9
Bronze	Tiana Bartoletta	Women's long jump	August 11
Bronze	Paul Chelimo	Men's 5000 m	August 12
Bronze	Ajeé Wilson	Women's 800 m	August 13

* – Indicates the athlete competed in preliminaries but not the final

== Results ==
=== Men ===
Track and road events

Athlete	Event	Heat		Semifinal		Final	
Athlete	Event	Result	Rank	Result	Rank	Result	Rank
Christopher Belcher	100 metres	10.13	=12 Q	10.20	13	Did not advance	
Christian Coleman	100 metres	10.01	2 Q	9.97	1 Q	9.94	2nd place, silver medalist(s)
Justin Gatlin	100 metres	10.05	=6 Q	10.09	6 Q	9.92 WMR SB	1st place, gold medalist(s)
Kyree King	200 metres	20.41	14 Q	20.59	14	Did not advance	
Ameer Webb	200 metres	20.22	8 Q	20.22	6 Q	20.26	5
Isiah Young	200 metres	20.19	7 Q	20.12	1 Q	20.64	8
Fred Kerley	400 metres	44.92	5 Q	44.51	6 q	45.23	7
LaShawn Merritt	400 metres	45.00	8 Q	45.52	20	Did not advance	
Wil London III	400 metres	45.10	13 Q	45.12	12	Did not advance	
Gil Roberts	400 metres	44.92	6 Q	44.84	10	Did not advance	
Donavan Brazier	800 metres	1:45.65	2 Q	1:46.27	12	Did not advance	
Isaiah Harris	800 metres	1:45.82	8 Q	1:46.66	17	Did not advance	
Drew Windle	800 metres	1:46.08	13 Q	1:46.33	14	Did not advance	
Robby Andrews	1500 metres	3:43.03	17 Q	DNF	–	Did not advance	
Matthew Centrowitz	1500 metres	3:48.34	37	Did not advance			
John Gregorek	1500 metres	3:39.62	8 q	3:38.68	7 q	3:37.56	10
Paul Chelimo	5000 metres	13:24.88	8 q	—		13:33.30	3rd place, bronze medalist(s)
Ryan Hill	5000 metres	13:22.79	5 Q	—		DNS	–
Eric Jenkins	5000 metres	13:31.09	23	—		Did not advance	
Shadrack Kipchirchir	10,000 metres	—				27:07.55 PB	9
Leonard Korir	10,000 metres	—				27:20.18 PB	13
Hassan Mead	10,000 metres	—				27:32.49 PB	15
Bobby Curtis	Marathon	—				2:21:22 SB	42
Elkanah Kibet	Marathon	—				2:15:14	16
Augustus Maiyo	Marathon	—				DNF	–
Devon Allen	110 metres hurdles	13.26	3 Q	13.27	9	Did not advance	
Aleec Harris	110 metres hurdles	13.50	17 Q	13.40	13	Did not advance	
Aries Merritt	110 metres hurdles	13.16	1 Q	13.25	6 Q	13.31	5
Kerron Clement	400 metres hurdles	49.46	8 Q	48.35	1 Q	48.52	3rd place, bronze medalist(s)
Eric Futch	400 metres hurdles	49.57	13 q	49.30	9	Did not advance	
TJ Holmes	400 metres hurdles	49.35	4 Q	49.12	7 Q	49.00	5
Michael Stigler	400 metres hurdles	DQ	–	Did not advance			
Hillary Bor	3000 metres steeplechase	8:27.53	17	—		Did not advance	
Evan Jager	3000 metres steeplechase	8:20.36	1 Q	—		8:15.53	3rd place, bronze medalist(s)
Stanley Kebenei	3000 metres steeplechase	8:24.19	12 Q	—		8:21.09	5
Mike Rodgers; Justin Gatlin; Jaylen Bacon; Christian Coleman; BeeJay Lee*	4 × 100 metres relay	37.70	1 Q	—		37.52	2nd place, silver medalist(s)
Wil London III; Gil Roberts; Michael Cherry; Fred Kerley; Bryshon Nellum*; Tony McQuay*	4 × 400 metres relay	2:59.23	1 Q	—		2:58.61	2nd place, silver medalist(s)

* – Indicates the athlete competed in preliminaries but not the final

Field events

Athlete	Event	Qualification		Final	
Athlete	Event	Distance	Position	Distance	Position
Erik Kynard	High jump	NM	–	Did not advance	
Bryan McBride	High jump	2.29	=7 q	2.25	8
Ricky Robertson	High jump	2.29	16	Did not advance	
Jeron Robinson	High jump	2.17	26	Did not advance	
Andrew Irwin	Pole vault	5.60	15	Did not advance	
Sam Kendricks	Pole vault	5.70	3 q	5.95	1st place, gold medalist(s)
Chris Nilsen	Pole vault	5.60	13	Did not advance	
Marquis Dendy	Long jump	7.78	20	Did not advance	
Jeff Henderson	Long jump	7.84	17	Did not advance	
Jarrion Lawson	Long jump	8.05	8 Q	8.44 SB	2nd place, silver medalist(s)
Chris Benard	Triple jump	17.20	1 Q	17.16	6
Will Claye	Triple jump	16.95	5 q	17.63	2nd place, silver medalist(s)
Donald Scott	Triple jump	16.63	13	Did not advance	
Christian Taylor	Triple jump	17.15	2 Q	17.68	1st place, gold medalist(s)
Ryan Crouser	Shot put	20.90	6 Q	21.20	6
Darrell Hill	Shot put	21.11	4 Q	20.79	11
Joe Kovacs	Shot put	20.67	10 q	21.66	2nd place, silver medalist(s)
Ryan Whiting	Shot put	20.84	8 Q	21.09	7
Rodney Brown	Discus throw	NM	–	Did not advance	
Andrew Evans	Discus throw	61.32	20	Did not advance	
Mason Finley	Discus throw	64.76	7 Q	68.03 PB	3rd place, bronze medalist(s)
Cyrus Hostetler	Javelin throw	79.71	18	Did not advance	
Kibwé Johnson	Hammer throw	68.86	32	Did not advance	
Rudy Winkler	Hammer throw	68.88	31	Did not advance	
Alex Young	Hammer throw	72.07	20	Did not advance	

Combined events – Decathlon

Athlete	Event	100 m	LJ	SP	HJ	400 m	110H	DT	PV	JT	1500 m	Final	Rank
Trey Hardee	Result	10.75	7.48 SB	15.16	1.99 SB	48.78 SB	DQ	NM	DNS	–	–	DNF	–
Trey Hardee	Points	917	930	800	794	872	0	0	0			DNF	–
Devon Williams	Result	10.93	7.44	14.43	1.96	48.11 PB	14.27	44.29	4.60	57.93	4:40.50	8088	10
Devon Williams	Points	876	920	755	767	904	940	752	790	707	677	8088	10
Zach Ziemek	Result	10.99	7.08	14.01	1.99	50.32	15.36	47.32 SB	5.10	58.35 SB	DNS	DNF	–
Zach Ziemek	Points	863	833	729 SB	794	800	807	815	941	713	0	DNF	–

=== Women ===
Track and road events

Athlete	Event	Heat		Semifinal		Final	
Athlete	Event	Result	Rank	Result	Rank	Result	Rank
Tori Bowie	100 metres	11.05	6 Q	10.91	4 Q	10.85 SB	1st place, gold medalist(s)
Deajah Stevens	100 metres	11.17	14 Q	11.32	23	Did not advance	
Ariana Washington	100 metres	11.28	20 Q	11.29	21	Did not advance	
Tori Bowie	200 metres	DNS	–	Did not advance			
Kimberlyn Duncan	200 metres	22.74	5 Q	22.73	5 Q	22.59	6
Deajah Stevens	200 metres	22.90	8 Q	22.71	4 Q	22.44	5
Kendall Ellis	400 metres	52.18	24	Did not advance			
Allyson Felix	400 metres	52.44	29 Q	50.12	2 Q	50.08	3rd place, bronze medalist(s)
Phyllis Francis	400 metres	50.94	2 Q	50.37	4 Q	49.92 PB	1st place, gold medalist(s)
Quanera Hayes	400 metres	51.43	12 Q	50.71	9	Did not advance	
Charlene Lipsey	800 metres	2:02.74	31 Q	1:59.35	4 q	1:58.73	7
Brenda Martinez	800 metres	2:01.53	19 q	2:01.31	17	Did not advance	
Ajeé Wilson	800 metres	2:00.52	5 Q	1:59.21	2 Q	1:56.65	3rd place, bronze medalist(s)
Kate Grace	1500 metres	4:04.76	15 q	4:16.70	23	Did not advance	
Jenny Simpson	1500 metres	4:08.92	24 Q	4:05.40	9 Q	4:02.76	2nd place, silver medalist(s)
Sara Vaughn	1500 metres	4:04.56 PB	14 q	4:06.83	18	Did not advance	
Shelby Houlihan	5000 metres	15:00.37 PB	10 Q	—		15:06.40	13
Molly Huddle	5000 metres	15:03.60	14 q	—		15:05.28	12
Shannon Rowbury	5000 metres	14:57.55 SB	5 Q	—		14:59.92	9
Molly Huddle	10,000 metres	—				31:24.78	8
Emily Infeld	10,000 metres	—				31:20.45 PB	6
Emily Sisson	10,000 metres	—				31:26.36	9
Serena Burla	Marathon	—				2:29:32	11
Amy Cragg	Marathon	—				2:27:18 SB	3rd place, bronze medalist(s)
Lindsay Flanagan	Marathon	—				2:39:47 SB	37
Nia Ali	100 metres hurdles	12.93	10 Q	12.79	5 Q	13.04	8
Dawn Harper-Nelson	100 metres hurdles	12.88	7 Q	12.63 SB	2 Q	12.63 SB	2nd place, silver medalist(s)
Kendra Harrison	100 metres hurdles	12.60	1 Q	12.86	8 q	12.74	4
Christina Manning	100 metres hurdles	12.87	6 Q	12.71	4 Q	12.74	5
Kori Carter	400 metres hurdles	54.99	3 Q	54.92	4 Q	53.07	1st place, gold medalist(s)
Shamier Little	400 metres hurdles	56.18	18 Q	55.76	11	Did not advance	
Dalilah Muhammad	400 metres hurdles	54.59	1 Q	55.00	5 Q	53.50	2nd place, silver medalist(s)
Cassandra Tate	400 metres hurdles	55.48	13 Q	55.31	7 q	55.43	7
Emma Coburn	3000 metres steeplechase	9:27.42	6 Q	—		9:02.58 CR AR	1st place, gold medalist(s)
Courtney Frerichs	3000 metres steeplechase	9:25.14	3 Q	—		9:03.77 PB	2nd place, silver medalist(s)
Colleen Quigley	3000 metres steeplechase	DQ	–	—		Did not advance	
Aaliyah Brown; Allyson Felix; Morolake Akinosun; Tori Bowie; Ariana Washington*	4 × 100 metres relay	41.84	1 Q	—		41.82 WL	1st place, gold medalist(s)
Quanera Hayes; Allyson Felix; Shakima Wimbley; Phyllis Francis; Kendall Ellis*; Natasha Hastings*	4 × 400 metres relay	3:21.66	1 Q	—		3:19.02 WL	1st place, gold medalist(s)
Miranda Melville	20 kilometres walk	—				1:34:47	33
Maria Michta-Coffey	20 kilometres walk	—				1:32:14 SB	25
Katie Burnett	50 kilometres walk	—				4:21:51 AR	4
Susan Randall	50 kilometres walk	—				DNF	–
Erin Taylor-Talcott	50 kilometres walk	—				DQ	–

* – Indicates the athlete competed in preliminaries but not the final

Field events

Athlete	Event	Qualification		Final	
Athlete	Event	Distance	Position	Distance	Position
Vashti Cunningham	High jump	1.92	=6 q	1.92	10
Inika Mcpherson	High jump	1.92	=4 q	1.92	9
Liz Patterson	High jump	1.80	27	Did not advance	
Emily Grove	Pole vault	NH	–	Did not advance	
Sandi Morris	Pole vault	4.55	=2 Q	4.75	2nd place, silver medalist(s)
Jenn Suhr	Pole vault	NH	–	Did not advance	
Tianna Bartoletta	Long jump	6.64	2 q	6.97	3rd place, bronze medalist(s)
Quanesha Burks	Long jump	6.44	14	Did not advance	
Brittney Reese	Long jump	6.50	9 q	7.02	1st place, gold medalist(s)
Shakeela Saunders	Long jump	6.32	21	Did not advance	
Tori Franklin	Triple jump	14.03 PB	13	Did not advance	
Dani Bunch	Shot put	17.39	18	Did not advance	
Michelle Carter	Shot put	18.92	2 Q	19.14	3rd place, bronze medalist(s)
Raven Saunders	Shot put	18.63	4 Q	17.86	10
Valarie Allman	Discus throw	53.85	28	Did not advance	
Whitney Ashley	Discus throw	60.94	13	Did not advance	
Gia Lewis-Smallwood	Discus throw	58.15	17	Did not advance	
Ariana Ince	Javelin throw	54.52	28	Did not advance	
Kara Winger	Javelin throw	61.27	15	Did not advance	
Gwen Berry	Hammer throw	69.12	14	Did not advance	
Maggie Ewen	Hammer throw	66.24	21	Did not advance	
DeAnna Price	Hammer throw	72.78	5 Q	70.04	9

Combined events – Heptathlon

Athlete	Event	100H	HJ	SP	200 m	LJ	JT	800 m	Final	Rank
Erica Bougard	Result	13.24	1.74	11.41	23.66	6.09	33.76	2:08.77	6036	18
Erica Bougard	Points	1089	903	622	1014	877	548	983	6036	18
Sharon Day-Monroe	Result	13.82	1.74	15.14	24.97	5.61	40.74	2:12.64 SB	6006	20
Sharon Day-Monroe	Points	1004	903	870	890	732	681	926	6006	20
Kendell Williams	Result	13.02	1.74	12.73	24.29	6.19	46.43	2:19.15	6220	12
Kendell Williams	Points	1121	903	709	953	908	791	835	6220	12
