= 2017 World Championships in Athletics – Women's 200 metres =

Women's 200 metres at the 2017 World Championships
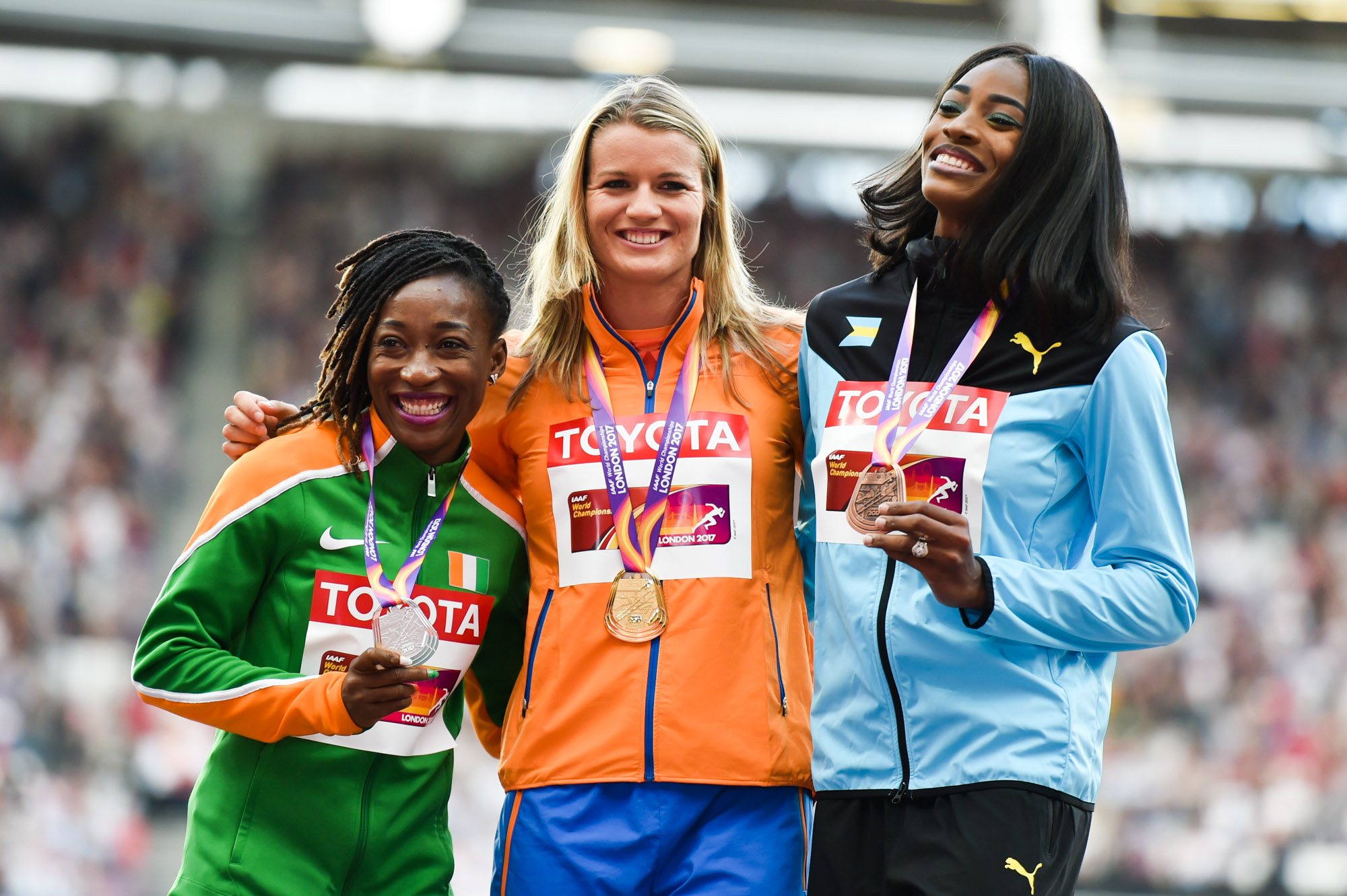
- The podium.
- Venue: Olympic Stadium
- Dates: 8 August (heats); 10 August (semifinal); 11 August (final)
- Competitors: 46 from 33 nations
- Winning time: 22.05

Medalists
gold medal	Dafne Schippers	Netherlands
silver medal	Marie-Josée Ta Lou	Ivory Coast
bronze medal	Shaunae Miller-Uibo	Bahamas

The women's 200 metres at the 2017 World Championships in Athletics was held at the London Olympic Stadium on 8 and 10−11 August.

== Summary ==
Defending champion Dafne Schippers from the Netherlands competed while some of her main competitors did not. Elaine Thompson, this event's silver medallist at the 2015 World Championships and gold medallist at the 2016 Olympics, did not compete. Also missing was Tori Bowie, the world leader and 100 metres gold medallist at these World Championships. Schippers' strongest challengers of the remaining athletes were considered to be Marie-Josée Ta Lou from the Ivory Coast, who won the silver medal in the 100 metres at these championships; Shaunae Miller-Uibo from the Bahamas, who won the gold medal in the 400 metres at the 2016 Olympic Games; and the U.S. athletes.

In the final, shorter sprinters like Ta Lou and Dina Asher-Smith from Great Britain were out of the blocks faster. By her fourth stride, Schippers was into her running motion and gaining with fewer strides than her shorter competitors. By the end of the turn, Schippers had a metre lead on Ta Lou and more than a two-metre lead on Asher-Smith. Down the stretch, Ta Lou gained ground on the lead, while behind them the tall Miller-Uibo was moving past Asher-Smith. Still, Schippers' lead held up for the win in 22.05 seconds. Ta Lou took the silver medal in a 22.08 second national record, and Miller-Uibo closed even faster for the bronze medal.

== Records ==
Before the competition records were as follows:

Record	Perf.	Athlete	Nat.	Date	Location
World	21.34	Florence Griffith-Joyner	USA	29 Sep 1988	Seoul, South Korea
Championship	21.63	Dafne Schippers	NED	28 Aug 2015	Beijing, China
World leading	21.77	Tori Bowie	USA	27 May 2017	Eugene, United States
African	22.07	Mary Onyali-Omagbemi	NGR	14 Aug 1996	Zürich, Switzerland
Asian	22.01	Li Xuemei	CHN	22 Oct 1997	Shanghai, China
NACAC	21.34	Florence Griffith-Joyner	USA	29 Sep 1988	Seoul, South Korea
South American	22.48	Ana Claudia Silva	BRA	6 Aug 2011	São Paulo, Brazil
European	21.63	Dafne Schippers	NED	28 Aug 2015	Beijing, China
Oceanian	22.23	Melinda Gainsford-Taylor	AUS	13 Jul 1997	Stuttgart, Germany

The following records were set at the competition:

Record	Perf.	Athlete	Nat.	Date
Ivorian	22.08	Marie-Josée Ta Lou	CIV	11 Aug 2017

== Qualification standard ==
The standard to qualify automatically for entry was 23.10.

== Schedule ==
The event schedule, in local time (UTC+1), was as follows:

Date	Time	Round
8 August	19:30	Heats
10 August	21:05	Semifinals
11 August	21:50	Final

== Results ==
=== Heats ===
The first round took place on 8 August in seven heats as follows:

Heat	1	2	3	4	5	6	7
Start time	19:29	19:37	19:45	19:53	20:01	20:09	20:17
Wind (m/s)	+0.5	−0.6	+0.1	−0.1	−0.4	+0.1	+0.5
Photo finish	link	link	link	link	link	link	link

The first three in each heat ( Q ) and the next three fastest ( q ) qualified for the semifinals. The overall results were as follows:

Rank	Heat	Lane	Name	Nationality	Time	Notes
1	1	6	Dafne Schippers	Netherlands	22.64	Q
2	4	5	Shaunae Miller-Uibo	Bahamas	22.69	Q
3	6	4	Marie-Josée Ta Lou	Ivory Coast	22.70	Q
4	5	2	Dina Asher-Smith	Great Britain & N.I.	22.73	Q, SB
5	2	8	Kimberlyn Duncan	United States	22.74	Q
6	2	5	Mujinga Kambundji	Switzerland	22.86	Q
7	5	7	Crystal Emmanuel	Canada	22.87	Q
8	3	6	Deajah Stevens	United States	22.90	Q
9	4	7	Simone Facey	Jamaica	22.98	Q
9	1	7	Tynia Gaither	Bahamas	22.98	Q
11	7	7	Rebekka Haase	Germany	22.99	Q
12	3	8	Ivet Lalova-Collio	Bulgaria	23.08	Q
13	6	6	Sarah Atcho	Switzerland	23.09	Q
14	1	4	Maria Belimpasaki	Greece	23.16	Q
15	6	8	Anthonique Strachan	Bahamas	23.23	Q
16	4	2	Edidiong Odiong	Bahrain	23.24	Q
17	2	4	Vitória Cristina Rosa	Brazil	23.26	Q
18	3	2	Sashalee Forbes	Jamaica	23.26	Q
19	1	2	Bianca Williams	Great Britain & N.I.	23.30	q
20	7	5	Rosângela Santos	Brazil	23.34	Q
21	2	3	Justine Palframan	South Africa	23.35	q
22	1	8	Jodean Williams	Jamaica	23.38	q
23	3	7	Shannon Hylton	Great Britain & N.I.	23.39	
24	4	8	Yana Kachur	Ukraine	23.47	
25	1	3	Anna Kiełbasińska	Poland	23.48	
26	7	2	Semoy Hackett	Trinidad and Tobago	23.50	Q
27	7	4	Cornelia Halbheer	Switzerland	23.51	
28	7	8	Gloria Hooper	Italy	23.51	
29	6	3	Sindija Bukša	Latvia	23.54	
30	4	4	Sada Williams	Barbados	23.55	
31	7	3	Gina Bass	Gambia	23.56	
32	2	6	Viktoriya Zyabkina	Kazakhstan	23.66	
33	5	8	Estelle Raffai	France	23.72	Q
34	6	5	Irene Siragusa	Italy	23.73	
35	4	3	Kayelle Clarke	Trinidad and Tobago	23.75	
36	1	5	Riley Day	Australia	23.77	
37	5	3	Janet Amponsah	Ghana	23.77	
38	3	5	Estela García	Spain	23.78	
39	2	7	Lorène Bazolo	Portugal	23.85	
40	3	4	Mariely Sánchez	Dominican Republic	23.89	
41	6	2	Isidora Jiménez	Chile	23.89	
42	4	6	Toea Wisil	Papua New Guinea	23.93	
43	3	3	Ella Nelson	Australia	24.02	
44	5	4	Nediam Vargas	Venezuela	24.35	
45	2	2	Ulfa Silpiana	Indonesia	25.23	
46	5	6	Regine Tugade	Guam	26.22	
	7	6	Tori Bowie	United States	DNS	
	5	5	Michelle-Lee Ahye	Trinidad and Tobago	DNS	
	6	7	Laura Müller	Germany	DNS	

=== Semifinals ===
The semifinals took place on 10 August in three heats as follows:

Heat	1	2	3
Start time	21:06	21:14	21:23
Wind (m/s)	−0.2	−0.2	−0.2
Photo finish	link	link	link

The first two in each heat ( Q ) and the next two fastest ( q ) qualified for the final. The overall results were as follows:

Rank	Heat	Lane	Name	Nationality	Time	Notes
1	1	5	Dafne Schippers	Netherlands	22.49	Q
2	2	7	Shaunae Miller-Uibo	Bahamas	22.49	Q
3	3	5	Marie-Josée Ta Lou	Ivory Coast	22.50	Q
4	1	6	Deajah Stevens	United States	22.71	Q
5	2	4	Kimberlyn Duncan	United States	22.73	Q
6	3	4	Dina Asher-Smith	Great Britain & N.I.	22.73	Q, SB
7	3	6	Crystal Emmanuel	Canada	22.85	q
8	3	7	Tynia Gaither	Bahamas	22.85	q
9	1	7	Ivet Lalova-Collio	Bulgaria	22.96	
10	2	5	Mujinga Kambundji	Switzerland	23.00	
11	2	6	Simone Facey	Jamaica	23.01	
12	1	4	Rebekka Haase	Germany	23.03	
13	1	3	Sashalee Forbes	Jamaica	23.09	
14	1	8	Sarah Atcho	Switzerland	23.12	
15	1	2	Justine Palframan	South Africa	23.21	
16	1	9	Anthonique Strachan	Bahamas	23.21	
17	3	8	Maria Belimpasaki	Greece	23.21	
18	2	8	Edidiong Odiong	Bahrain	23.24	
19	3	9	Vitória Cristina Rosa	Brazil	23.31	
20	3	2	Jodean Williams	Jamaica	23.32	
21	2	3	Bianca Williams	Great Britain & N.I.	23.40	
22	3	3	Estelle Raffai	France	23.45	
23	2	2	Semoy Hackett	Trinidad and Tobago	23.54	
	2	9	Rosângela Santos	Brazil	DQ	R 162.7

=== Final ===
The final took place on 11 August at 21:50. The wind was +0.8 metres per second and the results were as follows (photo finish):

Rank	Lane	Name	Nationality	Time	Notes
1st place, gold medalist(s)	6	Dafne Schippers	Netherlands	22.05	SB
2nd place, silver medalist(s)	4	Marie-Josée Ta Lou	Ivory Coast	22.08	NR
3rd place, bronze medalist(s)	5	Shaunae Miller-Uibo	Bahamas	22.15	
4	8	Dina Asher-Smith	Great Britain & N.I.	22.22	SB
5	7	Deajah Stevens	United States	22.44	
6	9	Kimberlyn Duncan	United States	22.59	
7	2	Crystal Emmanuel	Canada	22.60	
8	3	Tynia Gaither	Bahamas	23.07	
