= 2017 World Championships in Athletics – Men's 200 metres =

Men's 200 metres at the 2017 World Championships
- Venue: Olympic Stadium
- Dates: 7 August (heats); 9 August (semifinal); 10 August (final)
- Competitors: 49 from 38 nations
- Winning time: 20.09

Medalists
gold medal	Ramil Guliyev	Turkey
silver medal	Wayde van Niekerk	South Africa
bronze medal	Jereem Richards	Trinidad and Tobago

Video on YouTube Official Video

The men's 200 metres at the 2017 World Championships in Athletics was held at the London Olympic Stadium on 7, 9, and 10 August. The winning margin was 0.02 seconds.

== Summary ==
Coming out of the blocks in the final, Wayde van Niekerk and Isaac Makwala were the first to make up ground on the stagger, coming off the turn with Ramil Guliyev about even. Makwala started to lose ground, passed by Jereem Richards to his outside. van Niekerk seemed to have the edge until the last 30 metres when Guliyev pulled ahead. As Richards closed, all the athletes leaned for a photo finish. Guliyev had a clear win, but van Niekerk's edge for silver on Richards was the narrowest possible, .001 of a second 20.106 to 20.107.

== Records ==
Before the competition records were as follows:

Record	Perf.	Athlete	Nat.	Date	Location
World	19.19	Usain Bolt	JAM	20 Aug 2009	Berlin, Germany
Championship	19.19	Usain Bolt	JAM	20 Aug 2009	Berlin, Germany
World leading	19.77	Isaac Makwala	BOT	14 Jul 2017	Madrid, Spain
African	19.68	Frank Fredericks	NAM	1 Aug 1996	Atlanta, United States
Asian	19.97	Femi Ogunode	QAT	11 Sep 2015	Brussels, Belgium
NACAC	19.19	Usain Bolt	JAM	20 Aug 2009	Berlin, Germany
South American	19.81	Alonso Edward	PAN	20 Aug 2009	Berlin, Germany
European	19.72	Pietro Mennea	ITA	12 Sep 1979	Mexico City, Mexico
Oceanian	20.08	Peter Norman	AUS	16 Oct 1968	Mexico City, Mexico

The following records were set at the competition:

Record	Perf.	Athlete	Nat.	Date
Zambian	20.29	Sydney Siame	ZAM	7 Aug 2017

== Qualification standard ==
The standard to qualify automatically for entry was 20.44.

== Schedule ==
The event schedule, in local time (UTC+1), is as follows:

Date	Time	Round
7 August	18:30	Heats
9 August	20:55	Semifinals
10 August	21:50	Final

== Results ==
=== Heats ===
The first round took place on 7 August in seven heats. However, Isaac Makwala, who was prevented from competing due to being quarantined for norovirus, was allowed to run in an additional heat on the 9 August following an appeal by the Botswana delegation. The 8 heats were as follows:

Heat	1	2	3	4	5	6	7	8
Date	7 Aug							9 Aug
Start time	18:30	18:38	18:46	18:54	19:02	19:10	19:18	18:41
Wind (m/s)	−0.5	−0.6	+0.3	+0.7	−0.6	+0.6	+0.7	+1.4
Photo finish	link	link	link	link	link	link	link	link

The first three in each heat ( Q ) and the next four (Note: Originally three, but increases to four to accommodate Makwala's time in his additional heat.) fastest ( q ) qualified for the semifinals. The overall results were as follows:

Rank	Heat	Lane	Name	Nationality	Time	Notes
1	2	2	Jereem Richards	Trinidad and Tobago	20.05	Q
2	7	4	Nethaneel Mitchell-Blake	Great Britain & N.I.	20.08	Q
3	4	5	Ramil Guliyev	Turkey	20.16	Q
4	3	7	Wayde van Niekerk	South Africa	20.16	Q
5	3	8	Daniel Talbot	Great Britain & N.I.	20.16	Q, PB
6	8	7	Isaac Makwala	Botswana	20.20	q
7	6	8	Isiah Young	United States	20.19	Q
8	4	2	Ameer Webb	United States	20.22	Q
9	6	7	Akani Simbine	South Africa	20.26	Q
10	5	3	Sydney Siame	Zambia	20.29	Q, NR
11	6	4	Likourgos-Stefanos Tsakonas	Greece	20.37	Q
12	1	6	Yohan Blake	Jamaica	20.39	Q
13	4	4	Christophe Lemaitre	France	20.40	Q
14	2	7	Kyree King	United States	20.41	Q
15	6	6	Zharnel Hughes	Great Britain & N.I.	20.43	q
16	5	6	Kyle Greaux	Trinidad and Tobago	20.48	Q
17	4	7	Wilfried Koffi Hua	Ivory Coast	20.49	q
18	2	8	Rasheed Dwyer	Jamaica	20.49	Q
19	1	8	Abdul Hakim Sani Brown	Japan	20.52	Q
20	3	5	Ján Volko	Slovakia	20.52	Q
21	1	7	Alex Wilson	Switzerland	20.54	Q
22	4	3	David Lima	Portugal	20.54	q
23	1	3	Serhiy Smelyk	Ukraine	20.58	
24	7	3	Shota Iizuka	Japan	20.58	Q
25	5	4	Filippo Tortu	Italy	20.59	Q
26	2	6	Jonathan Quarcoo	Norway	20.60	
27	5	8	Warren Weir	Jamaica	20.60	
28	7	7	Winston George	Guyana	20.61	Q
29	3	3	Alonso Edward	Panama	20.61	SB
30	6	3	Ahmed Ali	Sudan	20.64	
31	2	4	Jeffrey John	France	20.66	
32	3	4	Sibusiso Matsenjwa	Swaziland	20.67	
33	2	5	Mark Otieno Odhiambo	Kenya	20.74	
34	1	2	Teray Smith	Bahamas	20.77	
35	5	2	Adama Jammeh	Gambia	20.79	
36	5	5	Jeremy Dodson	Samoa	20.81	
37	3	2	Aldemir da Silva Júnior	Brazil	20.82	
38	4	8	Salem Eid Yaqoob	Bahrain	20.84	
39	1	5	Bernardo Baloyes	Colombia	20.86	
40	6	2	Joseph Millar	New Zealand	20.97	
41	3	6	Burkheart Ellis, Jr.	Barbados	20.99	
42	6	5	Fabrice Dabla	Togo	21.40	
43	1	4	Mohamed Obaid Al-Saadi	Oman	21.50	
44	2	3	Ifeanyichukwu Otuonye	Turks and Caicos Islands	21.91	
45	7	2	Muhd Noor Firdaus ar-Rasyid	Brunei	22.36	
46	4	6	Kabongo Mulumba	DR Congo	23.57	SB
	7	5	Aaron Brown	Canada	DQ	R 163.3(a)
	7	6	Clarence Munyai	South Africa	DQ	R 163.3(a)
	4	9	Paul Nalau	Vanuatu	DQ	R 163.3(a)
	7	8	Julius Morris	Montserrat	DNS	

=== Semifinals ===
The semifinals took place on 9 August in three heats as follows:

Heat	1	2	3
Start time	20:55	21:04	21:13
Wind (m/s)	+2.1	−0.3	+0.3
Photo finish	link	link	link

The first two in each heat ( Q ) and the next two fastest ( q ) qualified for the final. The overall results were as follows:

Rank	Heat	Lane	Name	Nationality	Time	Notes
1	1	7	Isiah Young	United States	20.12	Q
2	2	5	Jereem Richards	Trinidad and Tobago	20.14	Q
3	1	1	Isaac Makwala	Botswana	20.14	Q
4	3	4	Ramil Guliyev	Turkey	20.17	Q
5	1	5	Nethaneel Mitchell-Blake	Great Britain & N.I.	20.19	q
6	3	5	Ameer Webb	United States	20.22	Q
7	3	6	Wayde van Niekerk	South Africa	20.28	q
8	3	8	Christophe Lemaitre	France	20.30	
9	3	7	Daniel Talbot	Great Britain & N.I.	20.38	
10	2	9	Abdul Hakim Sani Brown	Japan	20.43	Q
11	2	7	Yohan Blake	Jamaica	20.52	
12	2	6	Sydney Siame	Zambia	20.54	
13	1	2	David Lima	Portugal	20.56	
14	2	4	Kyree King	United States	20.59	
15	2	8	Ján Volko	Slovakia	20.61	
16	1	8	Shota Iizuka	Japan	20.62	
17	1	3	Filippo Tortu	Italy	20.62	
18	1	4	Akani Simbine	South Africa	20.62	
19	1	6	Kyle Greaux	Trinidad and Tobago	20.65	
20	1	9	Rasheed Dwyer	Jamaica	20.69	
21	3	9	Likourgos-Stefanos Tsakonas	Greece	20.73	
22	3	2	Winston George	Guyana	20.74	
23	3	3	Wilfried Koffi Hua	Ivory Coast	20.80	
24	2	3	Zharnel Hughes	Great Britain & N.I.	20.85	
25	2	2	Alex Wilson	Switzerland	21.22	

=== Final ===
The final took place on 10 August at 21:52. The wind was −0.1 metres per second and the results were as follows (photo finish):

Rank	Lane	Name	Nationality	Time	Notes
1st place, gold medalist(s)	5	Ramil Guliyev	Turkey	20.09	
2nd place, silver medalist(s)	3	Wayde van Niekerk	South Africa	20.11	20.106
3rd place, bronze medalist(s)	7	Jereem Richards	Trinidad and Tobago	20.11	20.107
4	2	Nethaneel Mitchell-Blake	Great Britain & N.I.	20.24	
5	9	Ameer Webb	United States	20.26	
6	6	Isaac Makwala	Botswana	20.44	
7	8	Abdul Hakim Sani Brown	Japan	20.63	
8	4	Isiah Young	United States	20.64	
