= 2017 World Championships in Athletics – Men's 4 × 100 metres relay =

Men's 4 × 100 metres relay at the 2017 World Championships
- Venue: Olympic Stadium
- Dates: 12 August (heats & final)
- Competitors: 64 from 15 nations
- Winning time: 37.47

Medalists
gold medal	Chijindu Ujah; Adam Gemili; Danny Talbot; Nethaneel Mitchell-Blake	Great Britain
silver medal	Mike Rodgers; Justin Gatlin; Jaylen Bacon; Christian Coleman	United States
bronze medal	Shuhei Tada; Shota Iizuka; Yoshihide Kiryu; Kenji Fujimitsu	Japan

Video on YouTube Official Video

The men's 4 × 100 metres relay at the 2017 World Championships in Athletics was held at the Olympic Stadium in London, England on 12 August.

== Summary ==
As the final was billed as Usain Bolt's final race, many eyes were on the Jamaican team, which put their hurdle gold medalist Omar McLeod on leadoff. Their main challenger was expected to be USA which put their 2015 anchor, Mike Rodgers on leadoff, and scheduled the fastest starter in the championships, Christian Coleman to run against Bolt on anchor. Earlier in the day, Bolt did anchor the team to qualify, minus McLeod. The home Great Britain team had run a strong semi-final, and led a quartet with France, China and Japan who were expected to compete for bronze, and possibly take advantage of slip-ups from the 'Big 2'.

Out of the blocks, USA and Jamaica were out about even, making up the stagger on Stuart Dutamby for France to their outside. Great Britain with Chijindu Ujah and on the far outside, Shuhei Tada for Japan were also out with them. A good British handoff to Adam Gemili had them passing China on their outside, while USA's 100 metre champion Justin Gatlin gained a step on Julian Forte for Jamaica. Into the third leg around the turn, USA's Jaylen Bacon maintained the lead against Jamaica's Yohan Blake, with Britain's Danny Talbot also ahead of Jamaica. Britain made a smooth blind handoff to Nethaneel Mitchell-Blake while Coleman took the baton off Bacon, Britain leaving the zone with a slight advantage, while Bolt had two metres to make up for Jamaica. Such a gain was expected to be within Bolt's ability but four steps into the straightaway, Bolt flinched in pain, hopping then somersaulting to the track. Mitchell-Blake and Coleman raced almost even until the last 20 metres when Mitchell-Blake pulled ahead and dipped at the finish line for an unexpected British win on home soil. 8 metres back, Japan came home with bronze, backing up their Olympic silver.

Medical aid with a wheelchair and his Jamaican teammates surrounded Bolt on the ground. While the British men's and women's relay teams celebrated together, Bolt lay on the ground in pain for a couple of minutes then refused the wheelchair and was helped to his feet by his teammates. With them by his side he limped across the finish line for the final time then went back to the ground wincing in pain. 100 Metre Champion Justin Gatlin blamed Bolt's injury on the poor planning and the teams being sent out forty-five minutes late.

During the final, the Chinese third leg runner Su Bingtian was accidentally hit on the head by Britain's second leg runner Adam Gemili as the former started his run. The Chinese side later decided not to make a post-race appeal and thus no further action was taken.

Great Britain's surprise gold, the first in the history of the event at the World Championships, and marked by a team with no individual medallists seeing off star-laced teams by means of superior technical baton changes, strong bend running and a notable esprit de corps, drew immediate comparisons with the Great Britain 2004 Summer Olympic 4 x 100 metre relay champions who had triumphed in similarly unexpected circumstances, the only other major global victory for the nation.

== Records ==
Before the competition records were as follows:

Record	Perf.	Team	Date	Location
World	36.84	Jamaica; Nesta Carter, Michael Frater, Yohan Blake, Usain Bolt	11 Aug 2012	London, United Kingdom
Championship	37.04	Jamaica; Nesta Carter, Michael Frater, Yohan Blake, Usain Bolt	4 Sep 2011	Daegu, South Korea
World leading	37.47	Great Britain; Chijindu Ujah, Adam Gemili, Danny Talbot, Nethaneel Mitchell-Blake	12 Aug 2017	London, United Kingdom
African	37.94	Nigeria; Osmond Ezinwa, Olapade Adeniken, Francis Obikwelu, Davidson Ezinwa	9 Aug 1997	Athens, Greece
Asian	37.60	Japan; Ryota Yamagata, Shota Iizuka, Yoshihide Kiryu, Asuka Cambridge	19 Aug 2016	Rio de Janeiro, Brazil
NACAC	36.84	Jamaica; Nesta Carter, Michael Frater, Yohan Blake, Usain Bolt	11 Aug 2012	London, United Kingdom
South American	37.90	Brazil; Vicente de Lima, Édson Ribeiro, André da Silva, Claudinei da Silva	30 Sep 2000	Sydney, Australia
European	37.47	Great Britain; Chijindu Ujah, Adam Gemili, Daniel Talbot, Nethaneel Mitchell-Blake	12 Aug 2017	London, United Kingdom
Oceanian	38.17	Australia; Paul Henderson, Tim Jackson, Steve Brimacombe, Damien Marsh	12 Aug 1995	Gothenburg, Sweden
Oceanian	38.17	Australia; Anthony Alozie, Isaac Ntiamoah, Andrew McCabe, Josh Ross	10 Aug 2012	London, United Kingdom

The following records were set at the competition:

Record	Perf.	Team	Date
World leading	37.47	Great Britain; Chijindu Ujah, Adam Gemili, Danny Talbot, Nethaneel Mitchell-Blake	12 Aug 2017 22:01
European	37.47	Great Britain; Chijindu Ujah, Adam Gemili, Danny Talbot, Nethaneel Mitchell-Blake	12 Aug 2017 22:01
British	37.47	Great Britain; Chijindu Ujah, Adam Gemili, Danny Talbot, Nethaneel Mitchell-Blake	12 Aug 2017 22:01
World leading	37.47	United Kingdom; Chijindu Ujah, Adam Gemili, Daniel Talbot, Nethaneel Mitchell-Blake	12 Aug 2017 22:01

== Qualification criteria ==
The first eight placed teams at the 2017 IAAF World Relays and the host country qualify automatically for entry with remaining places being filled by teams with the fastest performances during the qualification period.

== Schedule ==
The event schedule, in local time (UTC+1), is as follows:

Date	Time	Round
12 August	10:55	Heats
12 August	21:50	Final

== Results ==
=== Heats ===
Video on YouTube Official Video

The first round took place on 12 August in two heats as follows:

Heat	1	2
Start time	10:55	11:04
Photo finish	link	link

The first three in each heat ( Q ) and the next two fastest ( q ) qualified for the final. The overall results were as follows:

Rank	Heat	Lane	Nation	Athletes	Time	Notes
1	1	8	United States	Mike Rodgers, Justin Gatlin, Beejay Lee, Christian Coleman	37.70	Q, WL
2	1	4	Great Britain & N.I.	Chijindu Ujah, Adam Gemili, Danny Talbot, Nethaneel Mitchell-Blake	37.76	Q, SB
3	2	3	Jamaica	Tyquendo Tracey, Julian Forte, Micheal Campbell, Usain Bolt	37.95	Q, SB
4	2	8	France	Stuart Dutamby, Jimmy Vicaut, Mickaël-Méba Zeze, Christophe Lemaitre	38.03	Q, SB
5	2	6	China	Wu Zhiqiang, Xie Zhenye, Su Bingtian, Zhang Peimeng	38.20	Q
6	1	5	Japan	Shuhei Tada, Shota Iizuka, Yoshihide Kiryu, Asuka Cambridge	38.21	Q, SB
7	1	9	Turkey	Yiğitcan Hekimoğlu, Jak Ali Harvey, Emre Zafer Barnes, Ramil Guliyev	38.44	q, SB
8	2	2	Canada	Gavin Smellie, Aaron Brown, Brendon Rodney, Mobolade Ajomale	38.48	q
9	1	6	Trinidad and Tobago	Keston Bledman, Kyle Greaux, Moriba Morain, Emmanuel Callender	38.61	SB
10	2	7	Germany	Julian Reus, Robert Hering, Roy Schmidt, Robin Erewa	38.66	
11	1	2	Netherlands	Giovanni Codrington, Hensley Paulina, Liemarvin Bonevacia, Taymir Burnet	38.66	SB
12	1	7	Australia	Trae Williams, Tom Gamble, Nick Andrews, Rohan Browning	38.88	SB
13	2	4	Cuba	Harlyn Pérez, Roberto Skyers, Yaniel Carrero, José Luis Gaspar	39.01	SB
14	1	3	Barbados	Levi Cadogan, Ramon Gittens, Shane Brathwaite, Mario Burke	39.19	
	2	9	Bahamas	Warren Fraser, Shavez Hart, Sean Stuart, Teray Smith	DQ	R 163.3
	2	5	Antigua and Barbuda		DNS	

=== Final ===
The final took place on 12 August at 22:01. The results were as follows (photo finish):

Rank	Lane	Nation	Athletes	Time	Notes
1st place, gold medalist(s)	7	Great Britain & N.I.	Chijindu Ujah, Adam Gemili, Danny Talbot, Nethaneel Mitchell-Blake	37.47	WL, AR
2nd place, silver medalist(s)	4	United States	Mike Rodgers, Justin Gatlin, Jaylen Bacon, Christian Coleman	37.52	SB
3rd place, bronze medalist(s)	9	Japan	Shuhei Tada, Shota Iizuka, Yoshihide Kiryu, Kenji Fujimitsu	38.04	SB
4	8	China	Wu Zhiqiang, Xie Zhenye, Su Bingtian, Zhang Peimeng	38.34	
5	6	France	Stuart Dutamby, Jimmy Vicaut, Mickaël-Méba Zeze, Christophe Lemaitre	38.48	
6	2	Canada	Gavin Smellie, Aaron Brown, Brendon Rodney, Mobolade Ajomale	38.59	
7	3	Turkey	Yiğitcan Hekimoğlu, Jak Ali Harvey, Emre Zafer Barnes, Ramil Guliyev	38.73	
	5	Jamaica	Omar McLeod, Julian Forte, Yohan Blake, Usain Bolt	DNF	
