= Switzerland at the 2017 World Championships in Athletics =

- WA code: SUI
- Website: www.swiss-athletics.ch

in London
- Competitors: 19 in 13 events
- Medals: Gold 0 Silver 0 Bronze 0 Total 0

World Championships in Athletics appearances
- 1976; 1980; 1983; 1987; 1991; 1993; 1995; 1997; 1999; 2001; 2003; 2005; 2007; 2009; 2011; 2013; 2015; 2017; 2019; 2022; 2023; 2025

Switzerland competed at the 2017 World Championships in Athletics in London, United Kingdom, from 4–13 August 2017.

== Results ==
(q – qualified, NM – no mark, SB – season best)

=== Men ===
Track and road events

Athlete	Event	Heat		Semifinal		Final	
Athlete	Event	Result	Rank	Result	Rank	Result	Rank
Alex Wilson	100 metres	10.24	23 q	10.30	21	Did not advance	
Alex Wilson	200 metres	20.54	21 Q	21.22	25	Did not advance	
Kariem Hussein	400 metres hurdles	50.12	24 q	49.13	8 Q	50.07	8
Alejandro Francisco Florez	50 kilometres walk	—N/a				DQ	–

=== Women ===
Track and road events

Athlete	Event	Heat		Semifinal		Final	
Athlete	Event	Result	Rank	Result	Rank	Result	Rank
Mujinga Kambundji	100 metres	11.14	9 Q	11.11	10	Did not advance	
Salomé Kora	100 metres	11.30	22 q	11.31	22	Did not advance	
Sarah Atcho	200 metres	23.09	13 Q	23.12	14	Did not advance	
Cornelia Halbheer	200 metres	23.51	27	Did not advance			
Mujinga Kambundji	200 metres	22.86	6 Q	23.00	10	Did not advance	
Selina Büchel	800 metres	2:00.23	3 Q	1:59.85	9	Did not advance	
Petra Fontanive	400 metres hurdles	56.13	16 Q	55.79	12	Did not advance	
Yasmin Giger	400 metres hurdles	57.72	36	Did not advance			
Léa Sprunger	400 metres hurdles	55.14	6 Q	54.82	3 Q	54.59	5
Fabienne Schlumpf	3000 metres steeplechase	9:36.08	13	—N/a		Did not advance	
Ajla del Ponte; Sarah Atcho; Mujinga Kambundji; Salomé Kora	4 × 100 metres relay	42.50 NR	5 Q	—N/a		42.51	5
Laura Polli	20 kilometres walk	—N/a				1:39:05 SB	49

Field events

Athlete	Event	Qualification		Final	
Athlete	Event	Distance	Position	Distance	Position
Nicole Büchler	Pole vault	4.55	7 q	4.45	11
Angelica Moser	Pole vault	4.50	13	Did not advance	

Combined events – Heptathlon

Athlete	Event	100H	HJ	SP	200 m	LJ	JT	800 m	Final	Rank
Caroline Agnou	Result	13.95	1.68	13.64	24.64	6.22	43.54	2:18.57	6001	21
Caroline Agnou	Points	985	830	770	920	918	735	843	6001	21
Géraldine Ruckstuhl	Result	13.80 PB	1.80	13.36	24.84	5.82	52.15	2:14.85	6230	11
Géraldine Ruckstuhl	Points	1007	978	751	902	795	902	895	6230	11
