= France at the 2017 World Championships in Athletics =

- Flag of France
- WA code: FRA
- National federation: French Athletics Federation
- Website: athle.fr (in French)

in London, United Kingdom 4–13 August 2017
- Competitors: 55 in 29 events
- Medals Ranked 4th: Gold 3 Silver 0 Bronze 2 Total 5

World Championships in Athletics appearances
- 1976; 1980; 1983; 1987; 1991; 1993; 1995; 1997; 1999; 2001; 2003; 2005; 2007; 2009; 2011; 2013; 2015; 2017; 2019; 2022; 2023; 2025

France competed at the 2017 World Championships in Athletics in London, United Kingdom, from 4–13 August 2017.

== Medalists ==
Medal	Name	Event	Date
Gold	Pierre-Ambroise Bosse	Men's 800 metres	8 August
Gold	Kevin Mayer	Decathlon	12 August
Gold	Yohann Diniz	Men's 50 kilometres walk	13 August
Bronze	Renaud Lavillenie	Men's pole vault	8 August
Bronze	Mélina Robert-Michon	Women's discus throw	13 August

== Results ==
=== Men ===
Track and road events

Athlete	Event	Heat		Semifinal		Final	
Athlete	Event	Result	Rank	Result	Rank	Result	Rank
Jimmy Vicaut	100 metres	10.15	15 Q	10.09	6 q	10.08	6
Jeffrey John	200 metres	20.66	30	Did not advance			
Christophe Lemaitre	200 metres	20.40	12 Q	20.30	9	Did not advance	
Teddy Atine-Venel	400 metres	45.90	30	Did not advance			
Mamoudou Hanne	400 metres	45.89	29	Did not advance			
Pierre-Ambroise Bosse	800 metres	1:47.25	29 Q	1:45.63	4 q	1:44.67 SB	1st place, gold medalist(s)
Samir Dahmani	800 metres	1:48.62	36	Did not advance			
Mahiedine Mekhissi-Benabbad	1500 metres	3:46.17	30	Did not advance			
Garfield Darien	110 metres hurdles	13.36	7 Q	13.17	2 Q	13.30	4
Aurel Manga	110 metres hurdles	13.58	24	Did not advance			
Victor Coroller	400 metres hurdles	50.00	23 q	55.69	21	Did not advance	
Mamadou Kassé Hanne	400 metres hurdles	49.34	3 Q	50.35	17	Did not advance	
Ludvy Vaillant	400 metres hurdles	49.49	9 Q	49.95	15	Did not advance	
Mahiedine Mekhissi-Benabbad	3000 metres steeplechase	8:22.83	6 Q	—N/a		8:15.80	4
Yoann Kowal	3000 metres steeplechase	8:20.60	3 Q	—N/a		8:34.53	13
Stuart Dutamby; Jimmy Vicaut; Mickaël-Méba Zeze; Christophe Lemaitre	4 × 100 metres relay	38.03 SB	4 Q	—N/a		38.48	5
Ludvy Vaillant; Thomas Jordier; Mamoudou Hanne; Teddy Atine-Venel	4 × 400 metres relay	3:00.93	5 q	—N/a		3:01.79	8
Kévin Campion	20 kilometres walk	—N/a				1:21:46	24
Yohann Diniz	50 kilometres walk	—N/a				3:33:12 CR	1st place, gold medalist(s)

Field events

Athlete	Event	Qualification		Final	
Athlete	Event	Distance	Position	Distance	Position
Axel Chapelle	Pole vault	5.70	5 q	5.65	6
Renaud Lavillenie	Pole vault	5.70	1 q	5.89 SB	3rd place, bronze medalist(s)
Valentin Lavillenie	Pole vault	5.60	14	Did not advance	
Kévin Menaldo	Pole vault	5.45	22	Did not advance	
Benjamin Compaoré	Triple jump	16.46	21	Did not advance	
Jean-Marc Pontvianne	Triple jump	16.78	9 q	16.79	8
Melvin Raffin	Triple jump	16.18	24	Did not advance	
Lolassonn Djouhan	Discus throw	63.21	13	Did not advance	
Quentin Bigot	Hammer throw	76.11	3 Q	77.67	4

Combined events – Decathlon

Athlete	Event	100 m	LJ	SP	HJ	400 m	110H	DT	PV	JT	1500 m	Final	Rank
Bastien Auzeil	Result	11.35 SB	6.87	15.23	1.96	50.36 SB	14.59 SB	46.86	4.80	60.80	4:39.80 SB	7922 SB	15
Bastien Auzeil	Points	784	783	804	767	798	900	805	849	750	682	7922 SB	15
Kevin Mayer	Result	10.70 PB	7.52	15.72 SB	2.08	48.26 PB	13.75 PB	47.14	5.10	66.10	4:36.73 SB	8768 WL	1st place, gold medalist(s)
Kevin Mayer	Points	929	940	834	878	897	1007	811	941	830	701	8768 WL	1st place, gold medalist(s)

=== Women ===
Track and road events

Athlete	Event	Heat		Semifinal		Final	
Athlete	Event	Result	Rank	Result	Rank	Result	Rank
Orphée Neola	100 metres	11.58	33	Did not advance			
Carolle Zahi	100 metres	11.41	28	Did not advance			
Estelle Raffai	200 metres	23.72	33 Q	23.45	22	Did not advance	
Elea-Mariama Diarra	400 metres	52.06	22	Did not advance			
Déborah Sananes	400 metres	52.50	31	Did not advance			
Maeva Danois	3000 metres steeplechase	9:49.21	24	—N/a		Did not advance	
Orlann Ombissa-Dzangue; Ayodelé Ikuesan; Maroussia Paré; Carolle Zahi	4 × 100 metres relay	42.92 SB	9	—N/a		Did not advance	
Estelle Perrossier; Déborah Sananes; Agnès Raharolahy; Elea-Mariama Diarra	4 × 400 metres relay	3:27.59 SB	8 q	—N/a		3:26.56 SB	4

Field events

Athlete	Event	Qualification		Final	
Athlete	Event	Distance	Position	Distance	Position
Ninon Guillon-Romarin	Pole vault	4.20	20	Did not advance	
Jessica Cérival	Shot put	16.56	24	Did not advance	
Jeanine Assani Issouf	Triple jump	13.87	18	Did not advance	
Mélina Robert-Michon	Discus throw	63.97 SB	4 Q	66.21 SB	3rd place, bronze medalist(s)
Alexandra Tavernier	Hammer throw	72.69 SB	6 Q	66.31	12

Combined events – Heptathlon

Athlete	Event	100H	HJ	SP	200 m	LJ	JT	800 m	Final	Rank
Antoinette Nana Djimou	Result	13.46	1.71	14.61	25.17	6.05	44.94	2:21.14 SB	6064	16
Antoinette Nana Djimou	Points	1056	867	835	871	865	762	808	6064	16
