= Barbados at the 2017 World Championships in Athletics =

- Flag of Barbados
- WA code: BAR
- National federation: Athletics Association of Barbados
- Website: aab.sports.bb

in London, United Kingdom 4–13 August 2017
- Competitors: 7 (5 men and 2 women) in 6 events
- Medals: Gold 0 Silver 0 Bronze 0 Total 0

World Championships in Athletics appearances
- 1983; 1987; 1991; 1993; 1995; 1997; 1999; 2001; 2003; 2005; 2007; 2009; 2011; 2013; 2015; 2017; 2019; 2022; 2023; 2025

Barbados competed at the 2017 World Championships in Athletics in London, United Kingdom, 4–13 August 2017.

== Results ==
=== Men ===
Track and road events

Athlete	Event	Preliminaries		Heat		Semifinal		Final	
Athlete	Event	Result	Rank	Result	Rank	Result	Rank	Result	Rank
Mario Burke	100 metres	10.22	3 Q	10.42	39	Did not advance			
Ramon Gittens	100 metres	10.25	5 Q	10.24	24	Did not advance			
Burkheart Ellis	200 metres	—N/a		20.99	40	Did not advance			
Shane Brathwaite	110 metres hurdles	—N/a		13.39	10 Q	13.26 SB	7 Q	13.32	5
Levi Cadogan; Ramon Gittens; Shane Brathwaite; Mario Burke	4 × 100 metres relay	—N/a		39.19	14	—N/a		Did not advance	

=== Women ===
Track and road events

Athlete	Event	Heat		Semifinal		Final	
Athlete	Event	Result	Rank	Result	Rank	Result	Rank
Sada Williams	200 metres	23.55	30	Did not advance			
Tia-Adana Belle	400 metres hurdles	58.82	37	Did not advance			
