= 2017 World Championships in Athletics – Men's 400 metres hurdles =

Men's 400 metres hurdles at the 2017 World Championships
- Venue: Olympic Stadium
- Dates: 6 August (heats); 7 August (semifinal); 9 August (final)
- Competitors: 39 from 28 nations
- Winning time: 48.35

Medalists
gold medal	Karsten Warholm	Norway
silver medal	Yasmani Copello	Turkey
bronze medal	Kerron Clement	United States

Video on YouTube Official Video

The men's 400 metres hurdles at the 2017 World Championships in Athletics was held at the London Olympic Stadium on 6–9 August.

== Summary ==
Karsten Warholm led the final from start to finish. At the final hurdle, Abderrahman Samba, in second place and seemingly gaining on Warholm, stumbled and struggled to maintain his balance, dropping to seventh. From the last hurdle to the finish line Warholm increased his speed again, winning by a comfortable margin, while Yasmani Copello overtook Kerron Clement on the final run in to gain silver.

== Records ==
Before the competition records were as follows:

Record	Perf.	Athlete	Nat.	Date	Location
World	46.78	Kevin Young	USA	6 Aug 1992	Barcelona, Spain
Championship	47.18	Kevin Young	USA	19 Aug 1993	Stuttgart, Germany
World leading	47.80	Kyron McMaster	IVB	20 May 2017	Kingston, Jamaica
African	47.10	Samuel Matete	ZAM	7 Aug 1991	Zürich, Switzerland
Asian	47.53	Hadi Soua'an Al-Somaily	KSA	27 Sep 2000	Sydney, Australia
NACAC	46.78	Kevin Young	USA	6 Aug 1992	Barcelona, Spain
South American	47.84	Bayano Kamani	PAN	7 Aug 2005	Helsinki, Finland
European	47.37	Stéphane Diagana	FRA	5 Jul 1995	Lausanne, Switzerland
Oceanian	48.28	Rohan Robinson	AUS	31 Jul 1996	Atlanta, United States

The following records were set at the competition:

Record	Perf.	Athlete	Nat.	Date
Argentine	49.69	Guillermo Ruggeri	ARG	6 Aug 2017

== Qualification standard ==
The standard to qualify automatically for entry was 49.35.

== Schedule ==
The event schedule, in local time (UTC+1), is as follows:

Date	Time	Round
6 August	11:05	Heats
7 August	20:20	Semifinals
9 August	21:33	Final

== Results ==
=== Heats ===
The first round took place on 6 August in five heats as follows:

Heat	1	2	3	4	5
Start time	11:05	11:13	11:22	11:31	11:41
Photo finish	link	link	link	link	link

The first four in each heat ( Q ) and the next four fastest ( q ) qualified for the semifinals. The overall results were as follows:

Rank	Heat	Lane	Name	Nationality	Time	Notes
1	3	8	Yasmani Copello	Turkey	49.13	Q
2	4	9	Juander Santos	Dominican Republic	49.19	Q
3	5	2	Mamadou Kassé Hanne	France	49.34	Q
4	2	4	TJ Holmes	United States	49.35	Q
5	3	9	Abderrahman Samba	Qatar	49.39	Q
6	5	7	Márcio Teles	Brazil	49.41	Q
7	5	4	Patryk Dobek	Poland	49.42	Q
8	1	5	Kerron Clement	United States	49.46	Q
9	3	4	Ludvy Vaillant	France	49.49	Q
10	4	4	Karsten Warholm	Norway	49.50	Q
11	5	5	Aron Koech	Kenya	49.55	Q
12	5	3	Jack Green	Great Britain & N.I.	49.55	q
13	5	8	Eric Futch	United States	49.57	q
14	1	3	Takatoshi Abe	Japan	49.65	Q
15	4	3	Guillermo Ruggeri	Argentina	49.69	Q, NR
16	2	9	Jaheel Hyde	Jamaica	49.72	Q
17	2	5	Abdelmalik Lahoulou	Algeria	49.78	Q
18	2	6	Thomas Barr	Ireland	49.79	Q
19	3	2	José Reynaldo Bencosme de Leon	Italy	49.79	Q
20	1	6	Jaak-Heinrich Jagor	Estonia	49.81	Q
21	4	7	Ricardo Cunningham	Jamaica	49.91	Q
22	1	8	Kemar Mowatt	Jamaica	50.00	Q
23	4	5	Victor Coroller	France	50.00	q
24	3	7	Kariem Hussein	Switzerland	50.12	q
25	1	4	Hederson Estefani	Brazil	50.22	
26	3	5	Jordin Andrade	Cape Verde	50.32	
27	1	2	Javier Culson	Puerto Rico	50.33	
28	2	3	Yusuke Ishida	Japan	50.35	
29	2	2	Lorenzo Vergani	Italy	50.37	
30	5	9	Sergio Fernández	Spain	50.38	
31	4	6	Ryo Kajiki	Japan	51.36	
32	3	6	Creve Armando Machava	Mozambique	51.71	
33	1	7	José Luis Gaspar	Cuba	51.82	
34	5	6	Mehboob Ali	Pakistan	52.24	
35	2	7	Ephraim Lerkin	Papua New Guinea	52.36	
36	1	9	Pablo Andrés Ibáñez	El Salvador	52.72	
	4	2	Michael Stigler	United States	DQ	R 168.7(a)
	2	8	Kyron McMaster	British Virgin Islands	DQ	R 163.3(a)
	4	8	Eric Cray	Philippines	DQ	R 162.7
	3	3	Rasmus Mägi	Estonia	DNS	

=== Semifinals ===
The semifinals took place on 7 August in three heats as follows:

Heat	1	2	3
Start time	20:20	20:30	20:40
Photo finish	link	link	link

The first two in each heat ( Q ) and the next two fastest ( q ) qualified for the final. The overall results were as follows:

Rank	Heat	Lane	Name	Nationality	Time	Notes
1	1	7	Kerron Clement	United States	48.35	Q
2	1	5	Karsten Warholm	Norway	48.43	Q
3	1	4	Juander Santos	Dominican Republic	48.59	q, PB
4	1	3	Kemar Mowatt	Jamaica	48.66	q
5	3	6	Abderrahman Samba	Qatar	48.75	Q
6	3	4	Yasmani Copello	Turkey	48.91	Q
7	2	6	TJ Holmes	United States	49.12	Q
8	2	2	Kariem Hussein	Switzerland	49.13	Q
9	3	2	Eric Futch	United States	49.30	
10	1	8	Abdelmalik Lahoulou	Algeria	49.33	
11	1	6	Patryk Dobek	Poland	49.40	
12	2	7	Jaheel Hyde	Jamaica	49.75	
13	2	3	Jack Green	Great Britain & N.I.	49.93	
14	2	4	Takatoshi Abe	Japan	49.93	
15	3	5	Ludvy Vaillant	France	49.95	
16	3	8	José Reynaldo Bencosme de Leon	Italy	50.29	
17	2	5	Mamadou Kassé Hanne	France	50.35	
18	2	9	Aron Kipchumba Koech	Kenya	50.40	
19	2	8	Jaak-Heinrich Jagor	Estonia	50.43	
20	3	3	Ricardo Cunningham	Jamaica	50.54	
21	1	2	Victor Coroller	France	55.69	
	3	7	Márcio Teles	Brazil	DNF	
	3	9	Guillermo Ruggeri	Argentina	DQ	R 163.3(a)
	1	9	Thomas Barr	Ireland	DNS	

=== Final ===
The final took place on 9 August at 20:34. The results were as follows (photo finish):

Rank	Lane	Name	Nationality	Time	Notes
1st place, gold medalist(s)	5	Karsten Warholm	Norway	48.35	
2nd place, silver medalist(s)	8	Yasmani Copello	Turkey	48.49	
3rd place, bronze medalist(s)	4	Kerron Clement	United States	48.52	
4	3	Kemar Mowatt	Jamaica	48.99	
5	7	TJ Holmes	United States	49.00	
6	2	Juander Santos	Dominican Republic	49.04	
7	6	Abderrahman Samba	Qatar	49.74	
8	9	Kariem Hussein	Switzerland	50.07	
