= Jamaica at the 2017 World Championships in Athletics =

- Flag of Jamaica
- WA code: JAM
- National federation: Jamaica Athletics Administrative Association
- Website: trackandfieldjm.com

in London, United Kingdom 4–13 August 2017
- Competitors: 54 (21 men and 33 women) in 24 events
- Medals Ranked =15th: Gold 1 Silver 0 Bronze 3 Total 4

World Championships in Athletics appearances
- 1983; 1987; 1991; 1993; 1995; 1997; 1999; 2001; 2003; 2005; 2007; 2009; 2011; 2013; 2015; 2017; 2019; 2022; 2023; 2025

Jamaica competed at the 2017 World Championships in Athletics in London, United Kingdom, from 4–13 August 2017.

== Medalists ==
Medal	Athlete	Event	Date
Gold	Omar McLeod	Men's 110 m hurdles	7 August
Bronze	Usain Bolt	Men's 100 m	5 August
Bronze	Ristananna Tracey	Women's 400 m hurdles	10 August
Bronze	Jura Levy; Natasha Morrison; Simone Facey; Sashalee Forbes; Christania Williams*	Women's 4 × 100 m relay	12 August

* – Indicates the athlete competed in preliminaries but not the final

== Results ==
=== Men ===
Track and road events

Athlete	Event	Heat		Semifinal		Final	
Athlete	Event	Result	Rank	Result	Rank	Result	Rank
Yohan Blake	100 metres	10.13	12 Q	10.04	3 Q	9.99	4
Usain Bolt	100 metres	10.07	8 Q	9.98	2 Q	9.95 SB	3rd place, bronze medalist(s)
Julian Forte	100 metres	9.99 PB	1 Q	10.13	11	Did not advance	
Senoj-Jay Givans	100 metres	10.30	31	Did not advance			
Yohan Blake	200 metres	20.39	12 Q	20.52	11	Did not advance	
Rasheed Dwyer	200 metres	20.49	18 Q	20.69	20	Did not advance	
Warren Weir	200 metres	20.60	27	Did not advance			
Nathon Allen	400 metres	44.91	4 Q	44.19 PB	2 Q	44.88	5
Demish Gaye	400 metres	44.92	7 Q	44.55 PB	7 Q	45.04	6
Steven Gayle	400 metres	DQ	–	Did not advance			
Kemoy Campbell	5000 metres	13:26.67	9 q	—N/a		13:39.74	10
Ronald Levy	110 metres hurdles	DNF	–	Did not advance			
Omar McLeod	110 metres hurdles	13.23	2 Q	13.10	1 Q	13.04	1st place, gold medalist(s)
Hansle Parchment	110 metres hurdles	13.42	13 Q	13.27	8 Q	13.37	8
Ricardo Cunningham	400 metres hurdles	49.91	21 Q	50.54	20	Did not advance	
Jaheel Hyde	400 metres hurdles	49.72	16 Q	49.75	12	Did not advance	
Kemar Mowatt	400 metres hurdles	50.00	22 Q	48.66	4 q	48.99	4
Omar McLeod; Julian Forte; Yohan Blake; Usain Bolt; Micheal Campbell*; Tyquendo Tracey*	4 × 100 metres relay	37.95 SB	3 Q	—N/a		DNF	–
Peter Matthews; Steven Gayle; Jamari Rose; Rusheen McDonald	4 × 400 metres relay	3:01.98 SB	9	—N/a		Did not advance	

* – Indicates the athlete competed in preliminaries but not the final

Field events

Athlete	Event	Qualification		Final	
Athlete	Event	Distance	Position	Distance	Position
Ramone Bailey	Long jump	7.76	21	Did not advance	
Damar Forbes	Long jump	7.93	10 q	7.91	12
Clive Pullen	Triple jump	15.61	30	Did not advance	
O'Dayne Richards	Shot put	19.95	19	Did not advance	
Fedrick Dacres	Discus throw	64.82	5 Q	65.83	4
Travis Smikle	Discus throw	63.23	12 q	64.04	8

=== Women ===
Track and road events

Athlete	Event	Heat		Semifinal		Final	
Athlete	Event	Result	Rank	Result	Rank	Result	Rank
Simone Facey	100 metres	11.29	21 q	11.23	17	Did not advance	
Jura Levy	100 metres	11.09	8 Q	11.19	15	Did not advance	
Natasha Morrison	100 metres	11.21	15 Q	11.15	12	Did not advance	
Elaine Thompson	100 metres	11.05	5 Q	10.84	1 Q	10.98	5
Simone Facey	200 metres	22.98	=9 Q	23.01	11	Did not advance	
Sashalee Forbes	200 metres	23.26	18 Q	23.09	13	Did not advance	
Jodean Williams	200 metres	23.38	22 q	23.32	20	Did not advance	
Chrisann Gordon	400 metres	51.14	6 Q	50.87	10	Did not advance	
Shericka Jackson	400 metres	51.26	7 Q	50.70	8 q	50.76	5
Stephenie Ann McPherson	400 metres	51.27	8 Q	50.56 PB	5 Q	50.86	6
Novlene Williams-Mills	400 metres	51.00	4 Q	50.67	7 q	51.48	8
Natoya Goule	800 metres	2:01.77	22	Did not advance			
Kimarra McDonald	800 metres	2:09.19	44	Did not advance			
Rushelle Burton	100 metres hurdles	12.94	12 Q	12.94	12	Did not advance	
Megan Simmonds	100 metres hurdles	12.78	5 Q	12.93	11	Did not advance	
Yanique Thompson	100 metres hurdles	12.88	9 Q	12.88	10	Did not advance	
Danielle Williams	100 metres hurdles	12.66	2 Q	13.14	18	Did not advance	
Leah Nugent	400 metres hurdles	56.16	17 q	56.19	14	Did not advance	
Rhonda Whyte	400 metres hurdles	55.18	7 Q	DQ	–	Did not advance	
Ristananna Tracey	400 metres hurdles	54.92	2 Q	54.79	2 Q	53.74 PB	3rd place, bronze medalist(s)
Aisha Praught	3000 metres steeplechase	9:26.37	5 q	—N/a		DQ	–
Jura Levy; Natasha Morrison; Simone Facey; Sashalee Forbes; Christania Williams*	4 × 100 metres relay	42.50	5 Q	—N/a		42.19 SB	3rd place, bronze medalist(s)
Chrisann Gordon; Anneisha McLaughlin-Whilby; Shericka Jackson; Novlene Williams-Mills; Anastasia Le-Roy*; Stephenie Ann McPherson*	4 × 400 metres relay	3:23.64 SB	2 Q	—N/a		DNF	–

* – Indicates the athlete competed in preliminaries but not the final

Field events

Athlete	Event	Qualification		Final	
Athlete	Event	Distance	Position	Distance	Position
Shanieka Thomas	Triple jump	14.21	6 Q	14.13	8
Kimberly Williams	Triple jump	14.14	9 q	14.01	10
Danniel Thomas	Shot put	18.42	5 Q	18.91	4
Gleneve Grange	Shot put	15.96	29	Did not advance	
Tara-Sue Barnett	Discus throw	NM	–	Did not advance	
Kellion Knibb	Discus throw	56.73	23	Did not advance	
Shadae Lawrence	Discus throw	59.25	15	Did not advance	
