= 2017 World Championships in Athletics – Men's 100 metres =

Men's 100 metres at the 2017 World Championships
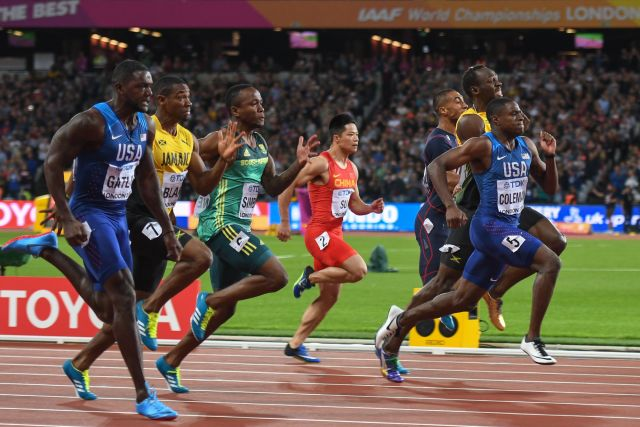
- A scene of the final
- Venue: Olympic Stadium
- Dates: 4 August (preliminary round & heats); 5 August (semi-final & final)
- Competitors: 60 from 45 nations
- Winning time: 9.92

Medalists
gold medal	Justin Gatlin	United States
silver medal	Christian Coleman	United States
bronze medal	Usain Bolt	Jamaica

Video on YouTube Official Video

The men's 100 metres at the 2017 World Championships in Athletics was held at the London Olympic Stadium on 4−5 August. This meet was announced as the last competition for Usain Bolt. The race was won by Justin Gatlin of the United States, ahead of Gatlin's team-mate Christian Coleman, with Usain Bolt finishing third.

== Background ==
Billed as his last individual race, world record holder and reigning world and Olympic champion Usain Bolt hoped to bow out of individual competition with one last gold medal. He originally planned to retire after the Summer Olympics in Rio De Janeiro the previous year, but decided to return due to his love for the London crowds. However, his season was hampered by his reoccurring hamstring injuries, as well as the death of his friend Germaine Mason. Coming into the championships, Bolt was only ranked 7th with 9.95 seconds. Meanwhile, young American Christian Coleman burst onto the athletics scene as the new favorite to dethrone Bolt, clocking a world-leading 9.82 seconds at the NCAA Championships and going on to win the 100-200 double. His only defeat came at the US Championships, where fellow Tennessee Vol and 2004 Olympic champion Justin Gatlin overtook the inexperienced Coleman, who overstrided towards the finish. The win came as a surprise for many, as the 35-year old veteran and 2005 world champion had an unusually rocky season despite being Bolt's biggest rival for the previous 4 years. Andre De Grasse of Canada also announced his intentions to defeat Bolt before his retirement; the triple medallist at the Rio Olympics proved he had the talent and confidence to stay calm against Bolt, especially when he rushed to the Jamaican's shoulder during the 200m semifinals. Despite not having gone under 10 seconds before the championships, many knew that De Grasse was a championship performer and would clock much faster times in London.

Meanwhile, Bolt's training partner and 2011 World Champion Yohan Blake, continued his injury comeback by winning the Jamaican 100m title in 9.90, the second fastest time of the year. Julian Forte and Senoj-Jay Givans, two sub-10 runners, filled out the Jamaican squad. Akani Simbine of South Africa was ranked 3rd in the year with 9.92, and won at the Doha Diamond League in May, though many believed he peaked too early as South African runners began their seasons in February. Christopher Belcher, the NCAA bronze medallist behind Coleman and ranked 4th in the year with 9.93, joined Coleman and Gatlin on the US squad. CJ Ujah of Great Britain appeared to be in top form, winning 3 Diamond League races in Rome, London, and Rabat, the latter in 9.98 seconds. In his absence, the incredibly fast-finishing Reece Prescod beat out former European Champion James Dasaolu at the British Championships. Other key players included co-European record holder and 3-time global finalist Jimmy Vicaut of France, 7th-ranked Thando Roto of South Africa, and Rio finalist Ben Youssef Meite of the Ivory Coast

Just days before the championships, De Grasse pulled out with a hamstring injury and was forced to miss his final chance to defeat Bolt.

== Summary ==
Coleman won his heat with ease in 10.01. Japanese runner Abdul Hakim Sani Brown placed himself as a favorite and surprised many by beating Blake in the second heat. Julian Forte of Jamaica was the fastest in the round, clocking 9.99 seconds in the third heat; Simbine finished 4th and qualified for the semis as a fastest loser, almost confirming claims he had already peaked earlier in the season. In the final heat, Bolt won with his slowest time of the season; his terrible start showed signs that he was, indeed, retiring at the right time.

In the first semi-final, Justin Gatlin qualified but seemed to struggle, losing to Akani Simbine of South Africa. Both were favorites to dethrone Bolt. In the second semi-final, Yohan Blake barely held off the hometown favorite Reece Prescod, who had a sudden surge of speed in the last ten metres to take the automatic qualifying spot from Su Bingtian of China. Run into slight headwinds, the first two semis were unimpressive, slower than ten seconds. In the third semi-final, Christian Coleman surprised the world by beating Bolt with 9.97 to his 9.98, despite it being a semi-final; in doing so, he became the first man in four years to beat Bolt, the last being Gatlin by the same margin (0.01) in an IAAF Diamond League event in Rome. Coleman rocketed out of the start, while Bolt lumbered. Bolt tried to make up the gap, but sensing he couldn't catch him, eased up at the finish. Bolt's time was still the second fastest in the semis.

In the final, Bolt was lined up in lane four, right next to his young rival Coleman. Gatlin lined up in lane eight, with Blake right next to him. At the gun, Coleman got the quickest reaction time, of 0.123, and Bolt with the second slowest in 0.183. Coleman continued with his usual fast start, with Bolt next to him lumbering behind by a metre in fourth expecting to make up ground on Jimmy Vicaut of France and Su Bingtian inside him. Meanwhile, the other half of the field seemed to struggle in the first 40 metres, but began to catch up with the pack afterwards. At that mark, Bolt began making up ground, first on Su, then on Vicaut. With every step, Bolt gained on his young rival, but as he got closer he began to tense up. Suddenly, with 15 metres to go, Gatlin in lane eight came out of nowhere and surged ahead of the two, securing his first world title since 2005 by 0.02 seconds. Gatlin's winning time of 9.92 seconds was the slowest World Championship winning time in the 100 metres since 2003, but was a new Masters world record, beating Kim Collins' 9.93 that he set the previous year. Coleman finished second in 9.94 seconds, while Bolt was third in 9.95 seconds, equaling his seasonal best that he set in Monaco.

== Records ==
Before the competition records were as follows:

Record	Perf.	Athlete	Nat.	Date	Location
World	9.58	Usain Bolt	JAM	16 Aug 2009	Berlin, Germany
Championship	9.58	Usain Bolt	JAM	16 Aug 2009	Berlin, Germany
World leading	9.82	Christian Coleman	USA	7 Jun 2017	Eugene, United States
African	9.85	Olusoji Fasuba	NGR	12 May 2006	Doha, Qatar
Asian	9.91	Femi Ogunode	QAT	4 Jun 2015	Wuhan, China
Asian	9.91	Femi Ogunode	QAT	22 Apr 2016	Gainesville, United States
NACAC	9.58	Usain Bolt	JAM	16 Aug 2009	Berlin, Germany
South American	10.00A	Robson da Silva	BRA	22 Jul 1988	Mexico City, Mexico
European	9.86	Francis Obikwelu	POR	22 Aug 2004	Athens, Greece
European	9.86	Jimmy Vicaut	FRA	4 Jul 2015	Saint-Denis, France
European	9.86	Jimmy Vicaut	FRA	7 Jun 2016	Montreuil, France
Oceanian	9.93	Patrick Johnson	AUS	5 May 2003	Mito, Japan

The following records were set at the competition:

Record	Perf.	Athlete	Nat.	Date
Slovak	10.15	Ján Volko	SVK	4 Aug 2017
World Masters M35	9.92	Justin Gatlin	USA	5 Aug 2017

== Qualification standard ==
The standard to qualify automatically for entry was 10.12.

== Schedule ==
The event schedule, in local time (UTC+1), was as follows:

Date	Time	Round
4 August	19:00	Preliminary round
4 August	20:20	Heats
5 August	19:05	Semi-finals
5 August	21:45	Final

== Results ==
=== Preliminary round ===
The preliminary round took place on 4 August in four heats as follows:

Heat	1	2	3	4
Start time	19:05	19:10	19:16	19:23
Wind (m/s)	+1.4	+1.1	+0.9	+0.7
Photo finish	link	link	link	link

The first three in each heat ( Q ) and the next two fastest ( q ) qualified for the first round proper. The overall results were as follows:

Rank	Heat	Lane	Name	Nationality	Time	Notes
1	3	3	Ján Volko	Slovakia	10.15	Q, NR
2	2	4	Emre Zafer Barnes	Turkey	10.22	Q
3	3	6	Mario Burke	Barbados	10.22	Q
4	3	8	Abdullah Abkar Mohammed	Saudi Arabia	10.23	Q, SB
5	4	3	Ramon Gittens	Barbados	10.25	Q
6	1	6	Emmanuel Matadi	Liberia	10.27	Q
7	4	5	Joseph Millar	New Zealand	10.29	Q
8	4	6	Warren Fraser	Bahamas	10.30	Q
9	1	3	Brendon Rodney	Canada	10.37	Q
10	1	7	Mark Odhiambo	Kenya	10.40	Q
11	2	6	Chavaughn Walsh	Antigua and Barbuda	10.44	Q
12	2	2	Hassan Saaid	Maldives	10.45	Q
13	4	8	Ambdoul Karim Riffayn	Comoros	10.59	q
14	4	7	Jean Tarcicius Batambok	Cameroon	10.71	q, PB
15	3	2	Rolando Palacios	Honduras	10.73	
16	3	7	Bui Ba Hanh	Vietnam	10.76	SB
17	1	4	Phearath Nget	Cambodia	10.99	SB
18	2	7	Dylan Sicobo	Seychelles	11.01	
19	1	8	Masbah Ahmmed	Bangladesh	11.08	
20	3	4	Said Gilani	Afghanistan	11.13	PB
21	4	2	Scott Fiti	Federated States of Micronesia	11.23	PB
22	3	5	Paul Ma'unikeni	Solomon Islands	11.31	PB
23	1	2	Mohamed Lamine Dansoko	Guinea	11.41	SB
24	4	4	Gwynn Uehara	Palau	11.47	SB
25	1	5	Dysard Dageago	Nauru	11.60	
26	2	8	Jeki Lanki	Marshall Islands	11.91	PB
27	2	3	Mobera Tonana	Kiribati	11.91	SB
28	2	5	Ielu Tamoa	Tuvalu	12.12	PB

=== Heats ===
The first round proper took place on 4 August in six heats as follows:

Heat	1	2	3	4	5	6
Start time	20:20	20:27	20:35	20:43	20:51	21:01
Wind (m/s)	−0.1	−0.6	0.0	−0.2	+0.9	+0.3
Photo finish	link	link	link	link	link	link

The first three in each heat ( Q ) and the next six fastest ( q ) qualified for the semi-finals. The overall results were as follows:

Rank	Heat	Lane	Name	Nationality	Time	Notes
1	3	4	Julian Forte	Jamaica	9.99	Q, PB
2	1	9	Christian Coleman	United States	10.01	Q
3	3	6	Ben Youssef Meïté	Ivory Coast	10.02	Q
4	4	4	Su Bingtian	China	10.03	Q, SB
5	3	2	Reece Prescod	Great Britain & N.I.	10.03	Q, PB
6	2	3	Abdul Hakim Sani Brown	Japan	10.05	Q, PB
6	5	5	Justin Gatlin	United States	10.05	Q
8	6	7	Usain Bolt	Jamaica	10.07	Q
9	4	2	Chijindu Ujah	Great Britain & N.I.	10.07	Q
10	1	5	Jak Ali Harvey	Turkey	10.13	Q
10	6	4	James Dasaolu	Great Britain & N.I.	10.13	Q
12	2	9	Yohan Blake	Jamaica	10.13	Q
12	4	9	Christopher Belcher	United States	10.13	Q
14	2	6	Xie Zhenye	China	10.13	Q
15	6	3	Jimmy Vicaut	France	10.15	Q
15	3	5	Akani Simbine	South Africa	10.15	q
17	5	7	Andrew Fisher	Bahrain	10.19	Q
17	6	6	Shuhei Tada	Japan	10.19	q
19	1	4	Cejhae Greene	Antigua and Barbuda	10.21	Q
20	4	3	Asuka Cambridge	Japan	10.21	q
21	2	7	Emre Zafer Barnes	Turkey	10.22	q
22	1	3	Emmanuel Matadi	Liberia	10.24	q
23	3	3	Alex Wilson	Switzerland	10.24	q
24	5	3	Kim Kuk-young	South Korea	10.24	Q
24	1	6	Ramon Gittens	Barbados	10.24	
26	1	7	Julian Reus	Germany	10.25	
27	2	8	Emmanuel Callender	Trinidad and Tobago	10.25	
28	2	5	Ján Volko	Slovakia	10.25	
29	5	2	Keston Bledman	Trinidad and Tobago	10.26	
30	5	6	Gavin Smellie	Canada	10.29	
31	1	2	Senoj-Jay Givans	Jamaica	10.30	
32	5	8	Abdullah Abkar Mohammed	Saudi Arabia	10.31	
33	4	5	Joseph Millar	New Zealand	10.31	
34	6	9	Hassan Taftian	Iran	10.34	
35	6	2	Brendon Rodney	Canada	10.36	
36	4	8	Mark Odhiambo	Kenya	10.37	
37	2	4	David Lima	Portugal	10.41	
38	6	8	Warren Fraser	Bahamas	10.42	
39	3	7	Mario Burke	Barbados	10.42	
40	3	8	Hassan Saaid	Maldives	10.45	
41	6	5	Diego Palomeque	Colombia	10.51	
42	4	6	Jeremy Dodson	Samoa	10.52	
43	2	2	Ambdoul Karim Riffayn	Comoros	10.72	
44	1	8	Jean Tarcicius Batambok	Cameroon	10.75	
	4	7	Mosito Lehata	Lesotho	DQ	R 162.7
	5	9	Thando Roto	South Africa	DQ	R 162.7
	5	4	Chavaughn Walsh	Antigua and Barbuda	DNS	
	3	9	Andre De Grasse	Canada	DNS	

=== Semi-finals ===
The semi-finals took place on 5 August in three heats as follows:

Heat	1	2	3
Start time	19:05	19:12	19:20
Wind (m/s)	−0.5	−0.2	+0.4
Photo finish	link	link	link

The first two in each heat ( Q ) and the next two fastest ( q ) qualified for the final. The overall results were as follows:

Rank	Heat	Lane	Name	Nationality	Time	Notes
1	3	4	Christian Coleman	United States	9.97	Q
2	3	6	Usain Bolt	Jamaica	9.98	Q
3	2	4	Yohan Blake	Jamaica	10.04	Q
4	2	9	Reece Prescod	Great Britain & N.I.	10.05	Q
5	1	2	Akani Simbine	South Africa	10.05	Q
6	1	6	Justin Gatlin	United States	10.09	Q
7	3	8	Jimmy Vicaut	France	10.09	q
8	2	6	Su Bingtian	China	10.10	q
9	3	7	Chijindu Ujah	Great Britain & N.I.	10.12	
10	1	7	Ben Youssef Meïté	Ivory Coast	10.12	
11	1	5	Julian Forte	Jamaica	10.13	
12	2	7	Jak Ali Harvey	Turkey	10.16	
13	2	8	Christopher Belcher	United States	10.20	
14	2	2	Emmanuel Matadi	Liberia	10.20	
15	1	4	James Dasaolu	Great Britain & N.I.	10.22	
16	1	3	Asuka Cambridge	Japan	10.25	
17	3	2	Shuhei Tada	Japan	10.26	
18	3	3	Emre Zafer Barnes	Turkey	10.27	
19	2	5	Abdul Hakim Sani Brown	Japan	10.28	
20	1	9	Xie Zhenye	China	10.28	
21	2	3	Alex Wilson	Switzerland	10.30	
22	3	5	Andrew Fisher	Bahrain	10.36	
23	1	8	Kim Kuk-young	South Korea	10.40	
24	3	9	Cejhae Greene	Antigua and Barbuda	10.64	

=== Final ===
The final took place on 5 August at 21:46. The wind was −0.8 metres per second and the results were as follows (photo finish):

Rank	Lane	Name	Nationality	Time	Reaction Time	Notes
1st place, gold medalist(s)	8	Justin Gatlin	United States	9.92	0.138	WMR SB
2nd place, silver medalist(s)	5	Christian Coleman	United States	9.94	0.123	
3rd place, bronze medalist(s)	4	Usain Bolt	Jamaica	9.95	0.183	SB
4	7	Yohan Blake	Jamaica	9.99	0.137	
5	6	Akani Simbine	South Africa	10.01	0.141	
6	3	Jimmy Vicaut	France	10.08	0.152	
7	9	Reece Prescod	Great Britain & N.I.	10.17	0.145	
8	2	Su Bingtian	China	10.27	0.224	
