= Turkey at the 2017 World Championships in Athletics =

- WA code: TUR

in London
- Competitors: 27 in 17 events
- Medals Ranked = 11th: Gold 1 Silver 1 Bronze 0 Total 2

World Championships in Athletics appearances (overview)
- 1983; 1987; 1991; 1993; 1995; 1997; 1999; 2001; 2003; 2005; 2007; 2009; 2011; 2013; 2015; 2017; 2019; 2022; 2023; 2025

Turkey has competed at the 2017 World Championships in Athletics in London, United Kingdom, from 4–13 August 2017.

== Medalists ==
Medal	Athlete	Event	Date
Gold	Ramil Guliyev	Men's 200 metres	August 10
Silver	Yasmani Copello	Men's 400 metres hurdles	August 9

== Results ==
=== Men ===
Track and road events

Athlete	Event	Preliminaries		Heat		Semifinal		Final	
Athlete	Event	Result	Rank	Result	Rank	Result	Rank	Result	Rank
Emre Zafer Barnes	100 metres	10.22	2 Q	10.22	21 Q	10.27	18	Did not advance	
Jak Ali Harvey	100 metres	—N/a		10.13	=10 Q	10.16	12	Did not advance	
Ramil Guliyev	200 metres	—N/a		20.16	3 Q	20.17	4 Q	20.09	1st place, gold medalist(s)
Polat Kemboi Arıkan	10,000 metres	—N/a						DNF	–
Kaan Kigen Özbilen	Marathon	—N/a						2:14.29	14
Mert Girmalegesse	Marathon	—N/a						2:17.36	29
Yasmani Copello	400 metres hurdles	—N/a		49.13	1 Q	48.91	6 Q	48.49	2nd place, silver medalist(s)
Tarık Langat Akdağ	3000 metres steeplechase	—N/a		8.53.42	44	—N/a		Did not advance	
Yiğitcan Hekimoğlu; Jak Ali Harvey; Emre Zafer Barnes; Ramil Guliyev	4 × 100 metres relay	—N/a		38.44 SB	7 q	—N/a		38.73	7
Ahmet Kasap; Batuhan Altıntaş; Mahsum Korkmaz; Yavuz Can	4 × 400 metres relay	—N/a		3:15.45	16	—N/a		Did not advance	
Ersin Tacir	20 kilometres walk	—N/a						1:24.43	45
Mert Atlı	20 kilometres walk	—N/a						1:31.26	58
Salih Korkmaz	20 kilometres walk	—N/a						DNF	–

Field events

Athlete	Event	Qualification		Final	
Athlete	Event	Distance	Position	Distance	Position
Eşref Apak	Hammer throw	73.55	16	Did not advance	
Özkan Baltacı	Hammer throw	74.69	11 Q	74.39	12

=== Women ===
Track and road events

Athlete	Event	Heat		Semifinal		Final	
Athlete	Event	Result	Rank	Result	Rank	Result	Rank
Meryem Akdağ	1500 metres	4:12.51	37	Did not advance			
Yasemin Can	5000 metres	15:08.20	16	—N/a		Did not advance	
Yasemin Can	10,000 metres	—N/a				31:35.48	11
Fadime Suna Çelik	Marathon	—N/a				DNF	–
Özlem Kaya	3000 metres steeplechase	9.37.06	14	—N/a		Did not advance	
Tuğba Güvenç	3000 metres steeplechase	10.13.03	38	—N/a		Did not advance	

Field events

Athlete	Event	Qualification		Final	
Athlete	Event	Distance	Position	Distance	Position
Eda Tuğsuz	Javelin throw	63.87	6 Q	64.52	5
Kıvılcım Kaya	Hammer throw	67.76	15	Did not advance	
