= Trinidad and Tobago at the 2017 World Championships in Athletics =

- Flag of Trinidad and Tobago
- WA code: TTO
- National federation: National Association of Athletics Administrations of Trinidad & Tobago
- Website: ttnaaa.org

in London, United Kingdom 4–13 August 2017
- Competitors: 20 (12 men and 8 women) in 13 events
- Medals Ranked =17th: Gold 1 Silver 0 Bronze 1 Total 2

World Championships in Athletics appearances
- 1983; 1987; 1991; 1993; 1995; 1997; 1999; 2001; 2003; 2005; 2007; 2009; 2011; 2013; 2015; 2017; 2019; 2022; 2023; 2025

Trinidad and Tobago competed at the 2017 World Championships in Athletics in London, United Kingdom, from 4–13 August 2017.

== Medalists ==
Medal	Name	Event	Date
Gold	Jarrin Solomon; Jereem Richards; Machel Cedenio; Lalonde Gordon; Renny Quow*	4 × 400 metres relay	August 13
Bronze	Jereem Richards	Men's 200 metres	August 10

* – Indicates the athlete competed in preliminaries but not the final

== Results ==
=== Men ===
Track and road events

Athlete	Event	Heat		Semifinal		Final	
Athlete	Event	Result	Rank	Result	Rank	Result	Rank
Keston Bledman	100 metres	10.26	29	Did not advance			
Emmanuel Callender	100 metres	10.25	27	Did not advance			
Kyle Greaux	200 metres	20.48	16 Q	20.65	19	Did not advance	
Jereem Richards	200 metres	20.05	1 Q	20.14	2 Q	20.11	3rd place, bronze medalist(s)
Machel Cedenio	400 metres	45.77	27 Q	45.91	21	Did not advance	
Lalonde Gordon	400 metres	45.02 SB	9 Q	45.20	15	Did not advance	
Renny Quow	400 metres	45.95	32	Did not advance			
Mikel Thomas	110 metres hurdles	13.98	37	Did not advance			
Ruebin Walters	110 metres hurdles	13.63	30	Did not advance			
Keston Bledman; Kyle Greaux; Moriba Morain; Emmanuel Callender	4 × 100 metres relay	38.61 SB	9	—N/a		Did not advance	
Jarrin Solomon; Jereem Richards; Machel Cedenio; Lalonde Gordon; Renny Quow*	4 × 400 metres relay	2:59.35 SB	2 Q	—N/a		2:58.12 WL, NR	1st place, gold medalist(s)

* – Indicates the athlete competed in preliminaries but not the final

Field events

Athlete	Event	Qualification		Final	
Athlete	Event	Distance	Position	Distance	Position
Keshorn Walcott	Javelin throw	86.01	3 Q	84.48	7

=== Women ===
Track and road events

Athlete	Event	Heat		Semifinal		Final	
Athlete	Event	Result	Rank	Result	Rank	Result	Rank
Michelle-Lee Ahye	100 metres	11.14	10 Q	11.04	7 q	11.01	6
Kelly-Ann Baptiste	100 metres	11.21	16 q	11.07	8 q	11.09	8
Khalifa St. Fort	100 metres	11.44	31	Did not advance			
Michelle-Lee Ahye	200 metres	DNS	–	Did not advance			
Kayelle Clarke	200 metres	23.75	35	Did not advance			
Semoy Hackett	200 metres	23.50	26 Q	23.54	23	Did not advance	
Domonique Williams	400 metres	53.72	45	Did not advance			
Deborah John	100 metres hurdles	DNF	–	Did not advance			
Sparkle McKnight	400 metres hurdles	55.46 SB	11 Q	56.59	19	Did not advance	
Semoy Hackett; Michelle-Lee Ahye; Khalifa St. Fort; Kelly-Ann Baptiste	4 × 100 metres relay	42.91 SB	8 q	—N/a		42.62 SB	6
