= 2017 World Championships in Athletics – Women's 100 metres =

Women's 100 metres at the 2017 World Championships
- Venue: Olympic Stadium
- Dates: 5 August (heats); 6 August (semifinal & final)
- Competitors: 47 from 30 nations
- Winning time: 10.85

Medalists
gold medal	Tori Bowie	United States
silver medal	Marie-Josée Ta Lou	Ivory Coast
bronze medal	Dafne Schippers	Netherlands

Video on YouTube Official Video

The women's 100 metres at the 2017 World Championships in Athletics was held at the London Olympic Stadium on 5−6 August.

== Summary ==
Going into the competition, Elaine Thompson could be nothing but the hot favourite to win the title. She was the Olympic Champion from Rio and the world leader by a huge margin. Defending champion Shelly-Ann Fraser-Pryce did not compete as she expected her first child. Returning silver medallist Dafne Schippers did not seem to be in her best shape, while the bronze medallist from 2015, Tori Bowie was expected to be among the medal contenders.

In the first semi-final, Marie-Josée Ta Lou won by 0.11 seconds over Dafne Schippers. Elaine Thompson proved why she was the favourite, winning her semi-final in 10.84 seconds, the fastest time of the day, ahead of Rosângela Santos who broke the South American continental record, while Bowie ran 10.91 seconds to win the third semi-final.

In the final, Ta Lou established an early lead. Thompson had the slowest reaction to the gun and failed to get into contention. Bowie, who had been closing on the leader, leaned early for her dip at the line, winning and then stumbling to the track. Returning silver medallist Dafne Schippers took bronze.

Bowie's injury at the end of the race caused her to drop out of the 200 metres.

== Records ==
Records before the competition:

Record	Perf.	Athlete	Nat.	Date	Location
World	10.49	Florence Griffith-Joyner	USA	16 Jul 1988	Indianapolis, United States
Championship	10.70	Marion Jones	USA	28 Aug 1999	Seville, Spain
World leading	10.71	Elaine Thompson	JAM	23 Jun 2017	Kingston, Jamaica
African	10.78	Murielle Ahouré	CIV	11 Jun 2016	Montverde, United States
Asian	10.79	Li Xuemei	CHN	18 Oct 1997	Shanghai, China
NACAC	10.49	Florence Griffith-Joyner	USA	16 Jul 1988	Indianapolis, United States
South American	10.99	Ángela Tenorio	ECU	22 Jul 2015	Toronto, Canada
European	10.73	Christine Arron	FRA	19 Aug 1998	Budapest, Hungary
Oceanian	11.11	Melissa Breen	AUS	9 Feb 2014	Canberra, Australia

Records set at the competition:

Record	Perf.	Athlete	Nat.	Date
South American	10.91	Rosângela Santos	BRA	6 Aug 2017
Brazilian	10.91	Rosângela Santos	BRA	6 Aug 2017
Cook Islands	12.18	Patricia Taea	COK	5 Aug 2017

== Qualification standard ==
The standard for automatic qualification was 11.26 s.

== Schedule ==
The event schedule, in local time (UTC+1), was:

Date	Time	Round
5 August	11:45	Heats
6 August	19:10	Semifinals
6 August	21:50	Final

== Results ==
=== Heats ===
The first round took place on 5 August in six heats:

Heat	1	2	3	4	5	6
Start time	11:44	11:53	12:03	12:09	12:20	12:30
Wind (m/s)	+1.3	+0.8	−0.3	0.0	−0.1	+0.6
Photo finish	link	link	link	link	link	link

The first three in each heat ( Q ) and the next six fastest ( q ) qualified for the semifinals. The consolidated results were:

Rank	Heat	Lane	Name	Nationality	Time	Notes
1	1	3	Gina Lückenkemper	Germany	10.95	Q, PB
2	4	7	Marie-Josée Ta Lou	Ivory Coast	11.00	Q
3	1	8	Murielle Ahouré	Ivory Coast	11.04	Q
4	5	9	Rosângela Santos	Brazil	11.04	Q, PB
5	2	2	Elaine Thompson	Jamaica	11.05	Q
6	3	4	Tori Bowie	United States	11.05	Q
7	4	2	Dafne Schippers	Netherlands	11.08	Q
8	1	5	Jura Levy	Jamaica	11.09	Q
9	5	2	Mujinga Kambundji	Switzerland	11.14	Q
10	5	7	Michelle-Lee Ahye	Trinidad and Tobago	11.14	Q
11	2	5	Crystal Emmanuel	Canada	11.14	Q, PB
12	1	2	Asha Philip	Great Britain & N.I.	11.14	q, SB
13	6	9	Daryll Neita	Great Britain & N.I.	11.15	Q
14	6	4	Deajah Stevens	United States	11.17	Q
15	6	3	Natasha Morrison	Jamaica	11.21	Q
16	6	5	Kelly-Ann Baptiste	Trinidad and Tobago	11.21	q
17	3	8	Blessing Okagbare	Nigeria	11.22	Q
18	6	6	Ewa Swoboda	Poland	11.24	q, SB
19	4	9	Carina Horn	South Africa	11.28	Q
20	2	3	Ariana Washington	United States	11.28	Q
21	5	3	Simone Facey	Jamaica	11.29	q
22	4	3	Salomé Kora	Switzerland	11.30	q
23	3	9	Ivet Lalova-Collio	Bulgaria	11.31	Q
24	3	2	Desiree Henry	Great Britain & N.I.	11.32	q
25	3	6	Ángela Tenorio	Ecuador	11.33	
26	2	6	Wei Yongli	China	11.37	
27	1	4	Toea Wisil	Papua New Guinea	11.41	
28	4	8	Carole Zahi	France	11.41	
29	6	8	Andrea Purica	Venezuela	11.43	
30	1	9	Naomi Sedney	Netherlands	11.43	
31	2	7	Khalifa St. Fort	Trinidad and Tobago	11.44	
32	3	5	Jamile Samuel	Netherlands	11.52	
33	2	4	Orphée Neola	France	11.58	
34	4	5	Narcisa Landazuri	Ecuador	11.59	
35	2	8	Charlotte Wingfield	Malta	11.82	
36	5	8	Leya Buchanan	Canada	11.84	
37	1	7	Loi Im Lan	Macau	12.00	
38	5	6	Dutee Chand	India	12.07	
39	6	2	Cecilia Bouele	Congo	12.15	
40	3	7	Patricia Taea	Cook Islands	12.18	NR
41	1	6	Yelena Ryabova	Turkmenistan	12.27	SB
42	5	4	Gorete Semedo	São Tomé and Príncipe	12.46	PB
43	4	6	Rechelle Meade	Anguilla	12.67	
44	4	4	Hereiti Bernardino	French Polynesia	12.88	
45	6	7	Zarinae Sapong	Northern Mariana Islands	13.29	PB
46	3	3	Marie-Charlotte Gastaud	Monaco	13.52	
	5	5	Tatjana Pinto	Germany	DQ	R 162.7

=== Semifinals ===
The semifinals took place on 6 August in three heats:

Video on YouTube Official Video

Heat	1	2	3
Start time	19:10	19:19	19:28
Wind (m/s)	+0.8	−0.2	+0.2
Photo finish	link	link	link

The first two in each heat ( Q ) and the next two fastest ( q ) qualified for the final. The consolidated results were:

Rank	Heat	Lane	Name	Nationality	Time	Notes
1	2	4	Elaine Thompson	Jamaica	10.84	Q
2	1	7	Marie-Josée Ta Lou	Ivory Coast	10.87	Q, SB
3	2	6	Rosângela Santos	Brazil	10.91	Q, AR
4	3	4	Tori Bowie	United States	10.91	Q
5	1	6	Dafne Schippers	Netherlands	10.98	Q
6	3	7	Murielle Ahouré	Ivory Coast	10.99	Q
7	3	9	Michelle-Lee Ahye	Trinidad and Tobago	11.04	q
8	1	2	Kelly-Ann Baptiste	Trinidad and Tobago	11.07	q
9	3	5	Blessing Okagbare	Nigeria	11.08	
10	2	7	Mujinga Kambundji	Switzerland	11.11	
11	2	5	Crystal Emmanuel	Canada	11.14	PB
12	3	8	Natasha Morrison	Jamaica	11.15	
13	1	4	Daryll Neita	Great Britain & N.I.	11.16	
14	3	6	Gina Lückenkemper	Germany	11.16	
15	1	9	Jura Levy	Jamaica	11.19	
16	3	2	Asha Philip	Great Britain & N.I.	11.19	
17	1	3	Simone Facey	Jamaica	11.23	
18	2	3	Desiree Henry	Great Britain & N.I.	11.24	
19	1	8	Ivet Lalova-Collio	Bulgaria	11.25	SB
20	2	9	Carina Horn	South Africa	11.26	
21	2	8	Ariana Washington	United States	11.29	
22	3	3	Salomé Kora	Switzerland	11.31	
23	1	5	Deajah Stevens	United States	11.32	
24	2	2	Ewa Swoboda	Poland	11.35	

=== Final ===
The final took place on 6 August at 21:51. The wind was +0.1 metres per second and the results were (photo finish):

Rank	Lane	Name	Nationality	Time	Notes
1st place, gold medalist(s)	7	Tori Bowie	United States	10.85	SB
2nd place, silver medalist(s)	4	Marie-Josée Ta Lou	Ivory Coast	10.86	=PB
3rd place, bronze medalist(s)	9	Dafne Schippers	Netherlands	10.96	
4	8	Murielle Ahouré	Ivory Coast	10.98	
5	6	Elaine Thompson	Jamaica	10.98	
6	3	Michelle-Lee Ahye	Trinidad and Tobago	11.01	
7	5	Rosângela Santos	Brazil	11.06	
8	2	Kelly-Ann Baptiste	Trinidad and Tobago	11.09	
