= Christian Coleman =

American sprinter (born 1996)

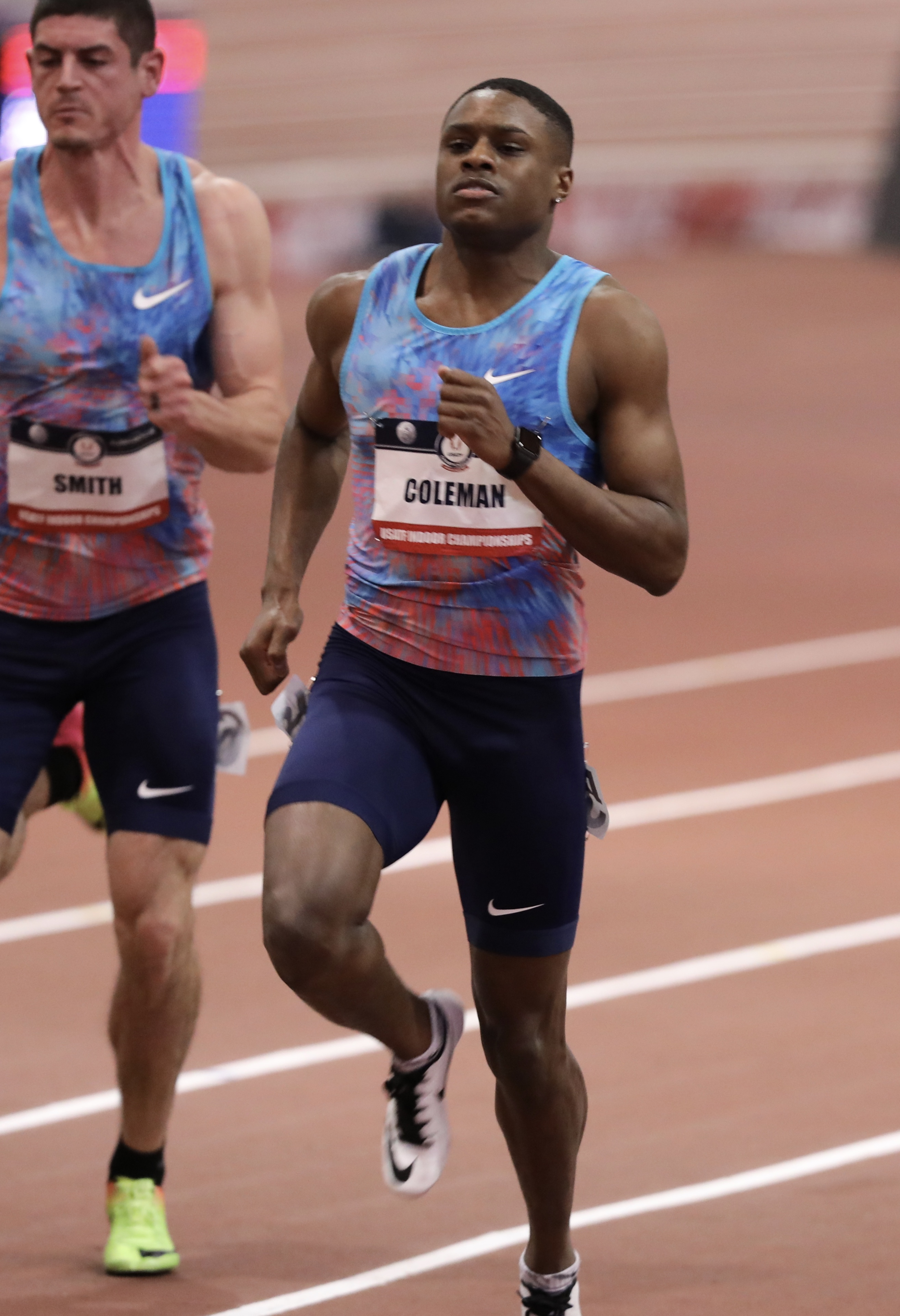
- Coleman at the 2018 USA Indoor Championships

Personal information
- Born: March 6, 1996 (age 30) Atlanta, Georgia, U.S.
- Height: 5 ft 9 in (175 cm)
- Weight: 159 lb (72 kg)

Sport
- Country: United States
- Sport: Track and field
- Event: Sprints
- College team: Tennessee Volunteers
- Team: Nike
- Turned pro: 2017
- Coached by: Dennis Mitchell

Achievements and titles
- Personal bests: 60 m: 6.34 A WR (2018); 100 m: 9.76 (2019); 200 m: 19.85 (2017)
Medal record
Men's athletics
Representing the United States
World Championships
Gold medal – first place	2019 Doha	100 m
Gold medal – first place	2019 Doha	4 × 100 m relay
Gold medal – first place	2023 Budapest	4 × 100 m relay
Gold medal – first place	2025 Tokyo	4 × 100 m relay
Silver medal – second place	2017 London	100 m
Silver medal – second place	2017 London	4 × 100 m relay
Silver medal – second place	2022 Eugene	4 × 100 m relay
World Indoor Championships
Gold medal – first place	2018 Birmingham	60 m
Gold medal – first place	2024 Glasgow	60 m
Silver medal – second place	2022 Belgrade	60 m
Diamond League
Winner	2018	100 m
Winner	2023	100 m
Winner	2025	100 m

Christian Lee Coleman (born March 6, 1996) is an American professional track and field sprinter who competes in the 60 metres, 100 m, and 200 m. The 2019 world champion in the 100 meters, he also won gold as part of men's 4 × 100-meter relay. He holds personal bests of 9.76 seconds for the 100 m, which made him the 7th fastest all-time in the history of 100 metres event, and 19.85 for the 200 m. Coleman is the world record holder for the indoor 60 meters with 6.34 seconds. He was the Diamond League champion in 2018 and 2023 and the world number one ranked runner in the men's 100 m for the 2017, 2018 and 2019 seasons.

Coleman represented the United States in the relay at the 2016 Summer Olympics, competing in the heats only. He was the gold medallist in the 60 m at the 2018 IAAF World Indoor Championships Birmingham and is a two-time American national champion, having won the 60 m in 2018 and 100 m in 2019. Coleman competed collegiately for the Tennessee Volunteers and won five NCAA titles indoors and out, including American collegiate record performances in both the 100 m and 60 m.

Coleman served an 18-month competition ban from May 2020 to November 2021 due to an anti-doping rule violation in relation to three missed tests. The initial sanction had been for 24 months, but this was later reduced by six months following an appeal. Coleman was arrested in 2026 for drug paraphernalia found in his car and resisting arrest, after his girlfriend Sha'Carri Richardson was arrested for dangerous excessive speeding.

== Career ==
Born to Seth and Daphne Coleman in Atlanta, Georgia, Christian Coleman grew up with two sisters, Camryn and Cailyn. He came from a sporting family, as two of his cousins were letter-winners in college football and his older sister Camryn competed in track and field at Georgia Southern University. He took part in track from a young age, winning the long jump in his age category at the Amateur Athletic Union Championships in 2007.

He attended high school at Our Lady of Mercy Catholic High School in Fayetteville, Georgia and was part of his high school track team. In his senior year, he competed at the 2014 New Balance Nationals Outdoor and was a finalist in both the 100-meter dash and 200-meter dash. At the Georgia High School State Championships he won the 100 m, 200 m, long jump, and 4 × 100 m relay, as well as setting state high school records in the 100 m (10.38), 200 m (21.10), and the 4 × 100 m relay (41.88). In addition, he was an all-state high school football player as a defensive back and wide receiver. He ended 2014 with a 100 m best of 10.30 seconds. Coleman received the Fred R. Langley Athletic Scholarship and went on to attend the University of Tennessee.

=== College ===
At Tennessee, Coleman was the 60 meters champion and 200 meters runner up at the 2016 SEC Indoor Track and Field Championships. He then went on to win the 200 meters at the National Track and Field Indoor Championships and was 3rd in the 60 meters. He was the runner-up in both the 100 meters and 200 meters dash at the 2016 NCAA Division I Outdoor Track and Field Championships.

After coming off an outstanding sophomore season, one that ended in making the 2016 Olympic team, he continued his success into his Junior season at Tennessee. During his indoor campaign he set PRs throughout the season resulting in world leading times in the 60 meters and 200 meters dash. Coleman took gold in both events at the 2017 Indoor National Track and Field Championships in historic fashion. He ran 6.45 seconds in the 60 meters, tying the collegiate record, and 20.11 seconds in the 200 meters, just 0.01 seconds off the collegiate record held by Wallace Spearmon. Christian finished his collegiate career by winning the 100 meters dash in 10.04 seconds and the 200 meters in 20.25 seconds at the 2017 NCAA Division I Outdoor Track and Field Championships. Coleman joins former Tennessee sprinter, Justin Gatlin, as the only other person to sweep the 60 meters and 200 meters indoor titles, and the 100 meters and 200 meters outdoor titles.

Coleman received some notoriety after the 2017 NFL draft scouting combine. John Ross set a new combine record of 4.22 seconds in the 40-yard dash and claimed he was faster than Olympic champion sprinter Usain Bolt. Coleman responded to this by running the 40 yards in 4.12 seconds on turf.

Coleman was Tennessee's first winner of The Bowerman in 2017, an award that honors collegiate track and field's most outstanding athlete of the year.

=== Professional ===
Coleman qualified for the 2016 Olympic Trials in both the 100 meters and 200 meters. In the 100 m semi-finals he broke the 10-second barrier for the first time, finishing in 9.95 seconds. He was a little slower in the final, however, placing sixth, which potentially qualified him for the 4 × 100 m relay team. On July 11, Coleman was named to the US 4 × 100 meters relay team. At the Olympics, Coleman ran the second leg for Team USA in the 4 × 100 meters relay qualifying as the team won their heat with a time of 37.65 seconds. The team that ran in the finals, without Coleman, was disqualified.

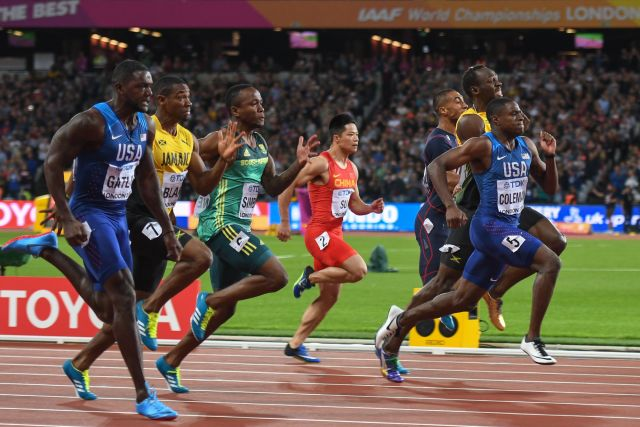
Coleman (right) running in the 2017 World Championships 100 m final

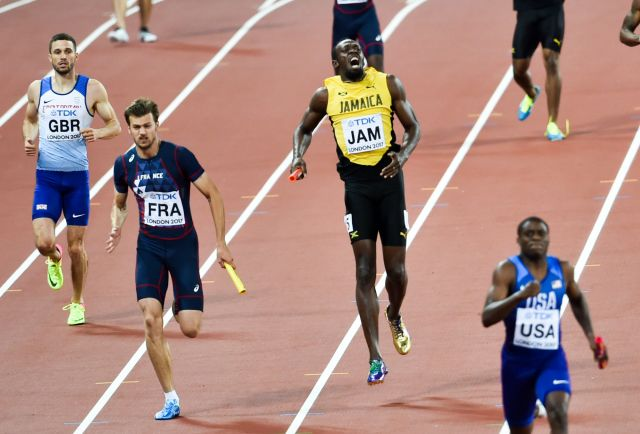
Coleman (right) running in the 2017 World Championships 4 × 100 m final

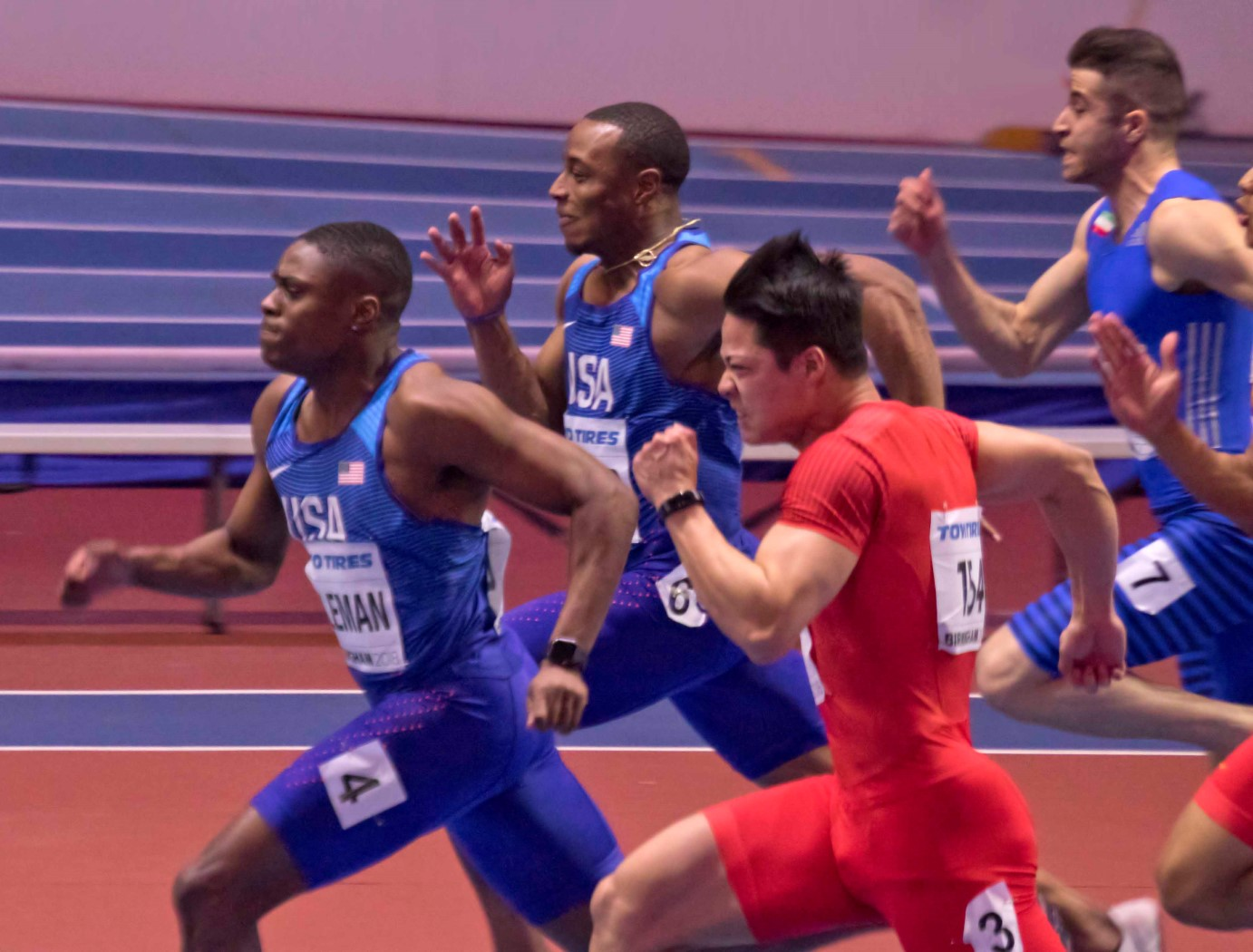
Coleman (left) winning the 60 m final at the 2018 World Indoor Championships

2017 would prove to be Coleman's big breakthrough on the international scene. After winning the 100 meters and the 200 meters at the NCAA Outdoor Championships, he turned pro; signing a contract with Nike. At the U.S. Championships in Sacramento, California; Coleman claimed second place in the 100 meters, running 9.98 s, behind Justin Gatlin's 9.95 s. Coleman also competed in the 200 meters, again finishing in second, behind Ameer Webb.

==== 2017 World Championships ====
Coleman claimed silver in the 100 meters final, with a time of 9.94 seconds, behind Justin Gatlin and ahead of Usain Bolt in his final 100 meters race. He dropped out of the 200 meter event, citing fatigue. He also ran the anchor leg for the US 4 × 100 meters relay team at the championships, finishing second with a time of 37.52 seconds,0.05 seconds behind Great Britain.

==== 2018 ====
Coleman began his 2018 indoor season with a world record time of 6.37 seconds in the 60 meters at the Clemson Invitational in South Carolina, breaking Maurice Greene's near 20-year-old record by two one hundredths of a second. However, his time was not submitted for ratification as a world record by USA Track & Field due to the event neither providing for electronic starting blocks, which measure reaction times in preventing false starts, nor a zero gun (AKA zero control) test, which checks that the automatic clock-timing system start and capture sequence are properly recorded. But, one month later, on February 18, 2018, at the United States Indoor Championships in Albuquerque, New Mexico, Coleman clocked a world record time of 6.34 seconds in the 60 meters final, thus breaking Maurice Greene's previously held record.

He went on to win the 60 meters world indoor title at the IAAF World Indoor Championships in Birmingham, clocking a championship record (previously held by Maurice Greene) of 6.37 seconds. The time is also the fastest recorded indoor performance at sea level. It is his first gold medal at the major championships.

At the start of the Outdoor season, Coleman suffered several setbacks. He injured his hamstring in April while in training and lost his first two 100 meter races of the year. One at the Prefontaine Classic in a wind-aided 9.84, and the other at an IAAF Diamond League event in Rome in 10.06. Both losses were to his teammate Ronnie Baker, who finished in third behind him at the 2018 World Indoor Championships. After his loss to Baker in Rome, Coleman dropped out of additional races in order to heal from his injuries.

Coleman finally returned to the circuit in July, winning the 100 m in Rabat, Morocco in 9.98 s in a tight finish. In doing so, he defeated his U.S. teammates Baker, Noah Lyles, and Mike Rodgers, who had all run 9.8 in Coleman's absence. Despite this decent return to form, he suffered more hamstring trouble while preparing for the 100 m at the London Müller Anniversary Games, and did not return to racing until mid-August. On August 18, Coleman won the 100 meters in 9.94 s in Birmingham, England, just beating home favorite Reece Prescod by 0.001 seconds.

At the 2018 Diamond League finals in Brussels, Belgium, Coleman clocked a blistering 9.79-second run into a −0.3 m/s wind during the men's 100 meters final, improving his personal best by three hundredths of a second. This performance marked Coleman as the joint 7th fastest performer of all time (tied with Maurice Greene) in the history of the event, as well as winning him his first Diamond League trophy. The time was the fastest run over the previous three years.

==== 2019 ====
Coleman skipped the 2019 indoor season in order to be fully prepared for the long outdoor season ahead.

Coleman began his 2019 season with a quick 9.86 s in the 100 meters at the IAAF Diamond League event in Shanghai, China. However, he was beaten on the line by compatriot Noah Lyles, who finished in the same time. He then won the 100 meters in Oslo, Norway in a world-leading 9.85. He ran his first 200-meter race in two years at the Golden Spike meet in Ostrava, Czech Republic, finishing second to Canada's Andre de Grasse in 19.97 seconds. Next, Coleman won the 100 m at the Prefontaine Classic in 9.81 seconds, lowering his world lead and beating world champion Justin Gatlin, who finished second in a season's best of 9.87.

In August 2019, the United States Anti-Doping Agency temporarily banned Coleman under anti-doping whereabouts rules, on the basis that he had missed three drug tests in a 12-month period. This would have resulted in a two-year ban excluding him from both the 2019 World Athletics Championships and the 2020 Tokyo Olympic Games. Coleman successfully appealed the decision on the basis that under the World Anti-Doping Agency's International Standard for Testing and Investigations, a first missed test should be backdated to the first day of that testing quarter (April 1, 2018, in Coleman's case). As Coleman's third whereabouts failure came on April 26, 2019, this meant he had missed two tests within any given 12-month period. The whereabouts failures, suspension, and subsequent successful appeal could have remained private but the news was leaked to the public prior to the World Championships.

On September 28, 2019, Coleman won the final of the men's 100 m at the World Championships in Doha, Qatar setting a personal best time of 9.76 seconds. That time makes Coleman the sixth fastest man in history, as well as the third fastest American in history. He subsequently withdrew from the 200 m at the same event, preventing him attempting a sprint double.

==== 2020 ====
In February, Coleman decided to compete at the U.S. Indoor Championships in Albuquerque on the 14th and 15th with the intent of breaking his world record in the 60 m. On the first day, he won his heat in a world-leading time of 6.48 s while slowing down before the finish line. On the second day he won his semi-final in a time of 6.51 s again slowing before the finish line, and then took the U.S. title a few hours later in a world-leading 6.37 s, equal his second fastest time in world history and 0.12 s ahead of second place Marvin Bracy.

On June 17, it was announced that Coleman was provisionally suspended from competition due to a further missed drug test dating back to December 9, 2019. On October 27, it was announced that Coleman had been banned until May 13, 2022, missing the 2020 Summer Olympics. He later appealed the decision to the Court of Arbitration for Sports.

==== 2021 ====
On April 16, Coleman's ban was reduced to 18 months on appeal, ending on November 13, 2021, meaning he would still miss the 2020 Olympics.

==== 2022 ====
Coleman had come back from his ban but wasn't back in his shape from the years before. He ran season bests of 6.41 in the 60 m, 9.87 in the 100 m, and 19.92 in the 200 m. He finished 6th in the 100 m at the World Championships at Eugene and earned silver with the 4 × 100 m relay team, which lost to Canada by just 0.07 seconds.

==== 2023 ====
1 year since Coleman was released from suspension, and he has regained more of his previous sprint form. He ran a season's best of 6.47 in the 60 m edging out Noah Lyles at the Millrose games on February the 11th.

Coleman had entered into Bermuda games 100 m and won with a wind aided time of 9.78 +4.4.This was his 2nd fastest 100 m time he had ever run in all conditions. He ran a season best of 19.93 in the USATF trials in the 200 m finishing 6th in the final.

Coleman went into the USATF champs trials in the 100 m and cruised through the heats and semi in sub 10 form. When the gun went off in the final, Coleman got his characteristic start leading for almost the whole race until Cravont Charleston upset the whole field just edging him out. Christian Coleman had to settle with the silver and went with hopes to medal in Budapest.

At the World Athletics Championships in Budapest, Coleman, entered for the 100 m, cruised through the heats to his semi-final, where he ran a new season's best of 9.88. Coleman didn't perform in the final of the Men's 100 m placing 5th with 9.92 behind the winner Noah Lyles’ 9.83. He managed to earn his only medal in the 4 × 100 m final, winning the gold in 37.38.

He took part in the Xiamen Diamond League, tying the world lead of 9.83. At the 2023 Diamond League finals in the 100 m, he won a close race against Noah Lyles, running 9.83 again. This season's best was Coleman's fastest time since the 2019 World Athletics Championships.

== Statistics ==
Information from World Athletics profile or Track & Field Results Reporting System unless otherwise noted.

=== Personal bests ===
Event	Time	Venue	Date	Notes
40-yard dash	4.12	Knoxville, USA	May 1, 2017	WR (Note: Not an official NFL record because not run at the NFL Combine, and not a distance or event recognized by the IAAF for records.)
60-meter dash	6.34	Albuquerque, USA	February 18, 2018	A, WR
100-meter dash	9.76	Doha, Qatar	September 28, 2019	(+0.6 m/s wind), WL
200-meter dash	19.85	Lexington, USA	May 27, 2017	(−0.5 m/s wind)
200-meter dash indoor	20.11	College Station, USA	March 11, 2017	Indoor WL
4 × 100-meter relay	37.10	Doha, Qatar	October 5, 2019	WL NR
4 × 200-meter relay	1:22.92	Gainesville, USA	April 2, 2016	

=== Season bests ===
Year	60 meters	100 meters	200 meters
2013	—	11.00	22.76
2014	—	10.30	20.94
2015	6.58	10.18	20.61
2016	6.52	9.95	20.26
2017	6.45	9.82	19.85
2018	6.34	9.79	—
2019	—	9.76	19.91
2020	6.37	—	—
2021	—	—	—
2022	6.41	9.87	19.92
2023	6.47	9.83	19.93
2024	6.41	9.86	19.89

=== International competitions ===
Representing the United States
Year	Competition	Venue	Position	Event	Time	Notes
2015	Pan American Junior Championships	Edmonton, Canada	3rd	100 m	10.32	(+0.4 m/s wind)
2016	NACAC U23 Championships	San Salvador, El Salvador	1st	4 × 100 m relay	38.63	PB
2016	Olympic Games	Rio de Janeiro, Brazil	1st (semi 1)	4 × 100 m relay	37.65	Q (Note: Coleman did not run in the final.), PB
2017	World Championships	London, England	2nd	100 m	9.94	(−0.8 m/s wind)
2017	World Championships	London, England	2nd	4 × 100 m relay	37.52	PB
2018	World Indoor Championships	Birmingham, England	1st	60 m	6.37	CR
2019	World Championships	Doha, Qatar	1st	100 m	9.76	(+0.6 m/s wind), WL, PB
2019	World Championships	Doha, Qatar	1st	4 × 100 m relay	37.10	WL
2022	World Indoor Championships	Belgrade Serbia	2nd	60 m	6.41	WL
2022	World Championships	Eugene, United States	6th	100 m	10.01	
2022	World Championships	Eugene, United States	2nd	4 × 100 m relay	37.55	
2023	World Championships	Budapest, Hungary	5th	100 m	9.92	
2023	World Championships	Budapest, Hungary	1st	4 × 100 m relay	37.38	WL
2024	World Indoor Championships	Glasgow, Scotland	1st	60 m	6.41	WL
2024	Olympic Games	Paris, France	1st (h)	4 × 100 m relay	37.47^{1}	
2025	World Championships	Tokyo, Japan	1st	4 × 100 m relay	37.29	
2026	World Ultimate Championship	Budapest, Hungary	5th	100 m	9.94	

^{1}Disqualified in the final

=== National championships ===
Representing the Tennessee Volunteers (2015–2017) and Nike (2017–2020)
Year	Competition	Venue	Position	Event	Time	Wind (m/s)	Notes
2015	NCAA Division I Indoor Championships	Fayetteville, Arkansas	6th	60 m	6.62	—N/a	
2015	NCAA Division I Championships	Eugene, Oregon	15th	100 m	10.19	+1.7	PB
2015	NCAA Division I Championships	Eugene, Oregon	15th	200 m	20.61	+1.7	PB
2015	USA Junior Championships	Eugene, Oregon	2nd	100 m	10.18	+2.0	PB
2015	USA Junior Championships	Eugene, Oregon	4th	200 m	20.75	+1.8	
2016	NCAA Division I Indoor Championships	Birmingham, Alabama	3rd	60 m	6.52	—N/a	PB
2016	NCAA Division I Indoor Championships	Birmingham, Alabama	1st	200 m	20.55	—N/a	
2016	NCAA Division I Indoor Championships	Birmingham, Alabama	2nd	4 × 400 m relay	3:06.29	—N/a	PB
2016	NCAA Division I Championships	Eugene, Oregon	2nd	100 m	10.23	−2.3	
2016	NCAA Division I Championships	Eugene, Oregon	2nd	200 m	20.26	−0.2	PB
2016	USA Olympic Trials	Eugene, Oregon	6th	100 m	10.06	+0.6	
2017	NCAA Division I Indoor Championships	College Station, Texas	1st	60 m	6.45	—N/a	WL, NCAAR, PB
2017	NCAA Division I Indoor Championships	College Station, Texas	1st	200 m	20.11	—N/a	WL, PB
2017	NCAA Division I Championships	Eugene, Oregon	1st	100 m	10.04	−2.1	
2017	NCAA Division I Championships	Eugene, Oregon	1st	200 m	20.25	−3.1	
2017	NCAA Division I Championships	Eugene, Oregon	18th	4 × 100 m relay	39.57	—N/a	
2017	USA Championships	Sacramento, California	2nd	100 m	9.98	−0.7	
2017	USA Championships	Sacramento, California	2nd	200 m	20.10	−2.3	
2018	USA Indoor Championships	Albuquerque, New Mexico	1st	60 m	6.34	—N/a	A, WR
2019	USA Championships	Des Moines, Iowa	1st	100 m	9.99	−1.0	
2019	USA Championships	Des Moines, Iowa	2nd	200 m	20.02	−0.7	
2020	USA Indoor Championships	Albuquerque, New Mexico	1st	60 m	6.37	—N/a	A, WL
2022	USA Indoor Championships	Spokane, Washington	1st	60 m	6.45	—N/a	WL
2023	USA Outdoor Championships	Eugene, Oregon	2nd	100 m	9.96	—N/a	—N/a

Grand Slam Track results
Slam	Race group	Event	Pl.	Time	Prize money
2025 Philadelphia Slam	Short sprints	200 m	6th	20.66	US$15,000
2025 Philadelphia Slam	Short sprints	100 m	4th	10.12	US$15,000

=== Circuit wins ===
- Diamond League (100 m)
  - Overall winner: 2018
  - Rabat: 2018
  - Birmingham: 2018
  - Brussels: 2018
  - Oslo: 2019
  - Stanford: 2019
  - Xiamen: 2023
  - Eugene: 2023, 2024
- World Indoor Tour (60 m)
  - Boston: 2018

== See also ==
- 2018 in 100 metres
- 2019 in 100 metres
- Men's 60 metres world record progression
- List of World Championships in Athletics medalists (men)
- List of IAAF World Indoor Championships medalists (men)
- List of 100 metres national champions (men)
- List of doping cases in athletics
- 100 metres at the World Championships in Athletics
- 4 × 100 metres relay at the World Championships in Athletics
- United States at the 2017 World Championships in Athletics

== Notes ==
Records
Preceded by Maurice Greene	Men's 60 m world record holder February 18, 2018 – present	Incumbent
Achievements
Preceded by Asafa Powell; Su Bingtian	Men's 60 m season's best 2017, 2018; 2020	Succeeded by Su Bingtian; Marcell Jacobs
Preceded by Justin Gatlin	Men's 100 m season's best 2017 – 2019	Succeeded by Michael Norman
