= Jaylen Bacon =

American sprinter

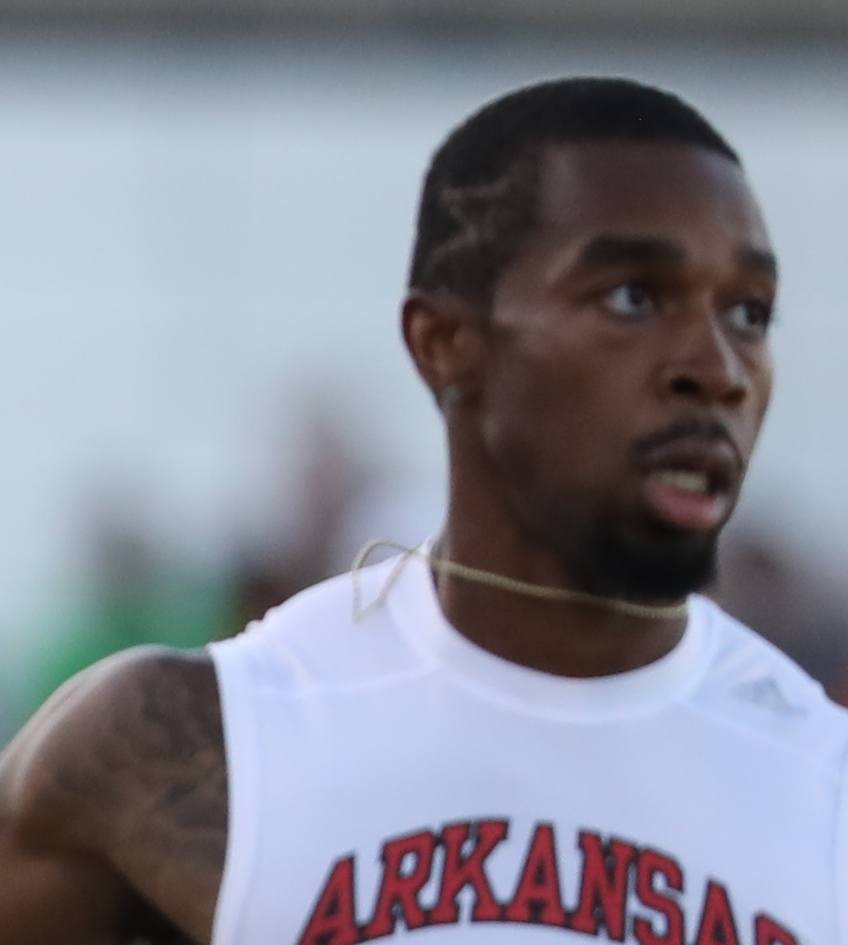
- Bacon at the 2018 NCAA Division I West Preliminary

Personal information
- Nationality: American
- Born: August 5, 1996 (age 30) Columbia, South Carolina
- Height: 6 ft (183 cm)

Sport
- Sport: Track and field
- Event: Sprints
- College team: Arkansas State Red Wolves
- Club: PURE Athletics
- Team: adidas
- Turned pro: 2018

Achievements and titles
- Personal bests: 60 m: 6.56 (College Station, 2017); 100 m: 9.97 (Sacramento, 2018); 200 m: 20.18 (Austin, 2017)
Medal record
Men's athletics
Representing the United States
World Championships
| Silver medal – second place | 2017 London | 4×100 m relay |

Jaylen Bacon (born August 5, 1996) is an American professional track and field athlete specializing in the sprints.

== Career ==
In 2017 he qualified to compete for the United States relay team at the World Championships in London, England after placing 4th at the USA Championships over 100 meters. The team placed second in the 4 × 100 m relay with Bacon running the third leg, earning them silver medals. He set his personal best in the 100 m a year later during the NCAA preliminaries, with a time of 9.97 seconds.

Bacon attended Arkansas State University, where he was a member of the track and field team. During his time there he made four NCAA finals, two USA finals, earned a silver medal at the World Championships, and broke the 10-second barrier. After his senior year in 2018 he turned pro, signing with Stellar Athletics management and a sponsorship deal with adidas.

== Statistics ==
Information from World Athletics profile unless otherwise noted.

=== Personal bests ===
| Event | Time (s) | Wind (m/s) | Competition | Venue | Date | Notes |
|---|---|---|---|---|---|---|
| 60 m | 6.56 | —N/a | NCAA Division I Indoor Championships | College Station, Texas, US | March 11, 2017 | |
| 100 m | 9.97 | +0.9 | NCAA Division I West Preliminary | Sacramento, California, US | May 25, 2018 | |
| 200 m | 20.18 | +1.7 | NCAA Division I West Preliminary | Austin, Texas, US | May 26, 2017 | |
| 4×100 m relay | 37.52 | —N/a | World Championships | London, England | August 12, 2017 | |

=== Seasonal bests ===
| Year | 100 meters | 200 meters |
|---|---|---|
| 2012 | 11.01 | 21.87 |
| 2013 | 10.71 | 22.42 |
| 2014 | 10.53 | 21.52 |
| 2015 | 10.10 | 20.71 |
| 2016 | 10.25 | 20.75 |
| 2017 | 10.00 | 20.18 |
| 2018 | 9.97 | 20.25 |
| 2019 | 10.24 | — |
| 2020 | 10.18 | — |
| 2021 | 10.12 | 20.72 |

=== Championship results ===
Representing the United States, Arkansas State Red Wolves (2016–2018), and adidas (2019–2021)
| Year | Competition | Venue | Position | Event | Time | Wind (m/s) | Notes |
|---|---|---|---|---|---|---|---|
| 2016 | NCAA Division I Championships | Eugene, Oregon, US | 12th | 100 m | 10.31 | +1.3 | |
| 2017 | NCAA Division I Indoor Championships | College Station, Texas, US | 3rd | 60 m | 6.56 | —N/a | PB |
| 2017 | NCAA Division I Championships | Eugene, Oregon, US | 5th | 100 m | 10.25 | −2.1 | |
| 2017 | NCAA Division I Championships | Eugene, Oregon, US | 8th | 200 m | 20.84 | −3.1 | |
| 2017 | USATF Championships | Sacramento, California, US | 4th | 100 m | 10.10 | −0.7 | |
| 2017 | World Championships | London, England | 2nd | 4×100 m relay | 37.52 | —N/a | PB |
| 2018 | NCAA Division I Indoor Championships | College Station, Texas, US | 5th | 60 m | 6.62 | —N/a | |
| 2018 | NCAA Division I Championships | Eugene, Oregon, US | 10th | 100 m | 10.10 | +1.2 | |
| 2018 | NCAA Division I Championships | Eugene, Oregon, US | 18th | 200 m | 20.73 | +1.5 | |
| 2018 | USATF Championships | Des Moines, Iowa, US | 8th (semis) | 100 m | 10.12 | +1.2 | Q (Note: Qualified for the final, but did not start (DNS) in the final.) |
| 2019 | USATF Championships | Des Moines, Iowa, US | 14th (semis) | 100 m | 10.49 | −3.7 | |
| 2021 | US Olympic Trials | Eugene, Oregon, US | 12th | 100 m | 10.17 | −0.3 | |

- NCAA results from Track & Field Results Reporting System.
