= Alex Wilson (Swiss sprinter) =

Swiss sprinter (born 1990)

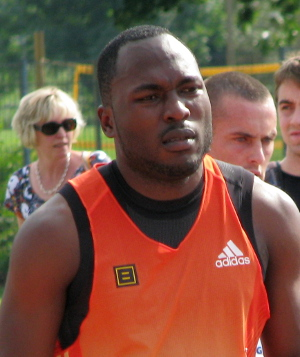

Personal information
- Nationality: Switzerland
- Born: 19 September 1990 (age 35) Kingston, Jamaica
- Home town: Basel
- Height: 1.82 m (5 ft 11 1/2 in)
- Weight: 78 kg (172 lb)

Sport
- Sport: Running
- Events: 100 metres, 200 metres
- Club: LAS Old Boys Basel

Achievements and titles
- Personal bests: 100 m 10.08 NR (+0.1 m/s) (La Chaux-de-Fonds 2019); 200 m 19.98 NR (+1.5 m/s) (La Chaux-de-Fonds 2019)
Medal record
Representing Switzerland
Men's athletics
European Championships
Bronze medal – third place	2018 Berlin	200 m

Alex Wilson (born 19 September 1990 in Kingston, Jamaica) is a retired Swiss sprinter of Jamaican origin. He finished third at the 2018 European Championships in the 200 metres event.

Wilson is currently serving a ten-year ban due to end in 2035 for breaking anti-doping rules.

== Career ==
=== Results ===
In 2010 he competed in the 200 metres at the 2010 European Athletics Championships, finishing in 8th place out of 8 sprinters in Heat 2 of Round 1, failing to advance to the Semifinals, with a time of 21.40. In 2011 he ran a Swiss under-23 record of 20.51 in the 200 m to qualify for the 2011 World Championships in Daegu, where he failed to advance from his heat. He was part of the Swiss team for the 2012 Summer Olympics, competing in the 200 metres where he progressed to the semi-final stage and finished 7th in the second semi-finals run. Also he made the semi-finals of the 200 m in the 2012 European championships. He is a national record holder for outdoor 100, 150, 200 m events. At the 2016 European championships in Amsterdam, Wilson made the 200 m and 4 × 100 m finals though came away without any silverware. The same can be said for the 2014 European championships where Alex made the final of the 4 × 100 m but only finished 4th. But in 2018 he won his first major medal when he finished 3rd in the 200 m at the 2018 European championships in Berlin. He also made the semifinal of the 2017 World championships in London in both the 200 m and the 100 m.

He has competed in one Olympic games, three World Championships and five European Championships over the course of his career.

=== Multiple doping bans ===
Following an earlier suspension, in June 2022 Wilson was issued with a four-year ban by the Swiss Anti-Doping Agency backdated to April 2021 for an anti-doping rule violation after testing positive for the steroid trenbolone. In April 2025, Wilson was issued with a ten-year ban for aggravated breaches of anti-doping rules relating to use of EPO and tampering with records.
