= Deajah Stevens =

American sprinter

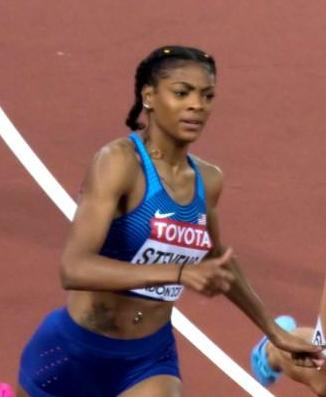
- Deajah at Mt. San Antonio College

Personal information
- Born: May 19, 1995 (age 31)
- Height: 5 ft 10 in (178 cm)
- Weight: 140 lb (64 kg)

Sport
- Country: United States
- Sport: Track and field
- Event: sprints

Achievements and titles
- Personal bests: 100m: 11.00 (Torrance 2017), 200m: 22.09s (Eugene 2017)

Deajah Stevens (born May 19, 1995) is an American track and field athlete known for sprinting events. At the 2016 US Olympic Trials, she finished in second place to qualify her to the 2016 Olympics in the 200 meters on her home track Hayward Field at the University of Oregon.

== College ==
A few weeks before qualifying, she finished second in the same event on the same track behind teammate Ariana Washington as she completed a double win at the 2016 NCAA Division I Outdoor Track and Field Championships, part of Oregon winning the team championship.

In 2015–16, her sophomore year in college was her first year at Oregon, previously she had run at the College of the Sequoias, winning the California Junior College championships in both 200 meters and 400 meters as well as taking second in the long jump.

== Prep ==
Stevens is a graduate of Benjamin Cardozo High School in Bayside, New York, where she was a three-time state champion. Stevens has been running since she was eleven years old and has been a member of the Hall's Express Track and Field Team, based in Mount Vernon, New York, where she has been under the tutelage of coach Anthony Hall since she started running.

== Whereabouts ban ==
In 2020, Stevens was banned from the sport for 18 months after failing to appear for drug tests in 2019 and 2020. She had three violations in the span of one year. As a result, Stevens missed the 2021 Olympics in Tokyo.
