= Bahamas at the 2017 World Championships in Athletics =

- Flag of the Bahamas
- WA code: BAH
- National federation: Bahamas Association of Athletic Associations
- Website: baaabahamas.com

in London, United Kingdom 4–13 August 2017
- Competitors: 21 (10 men and 11 women) in 13 events
- Medals Ranked =29th: Gold 0 Silver 1 Bronze 1 Total 2

World Championships in Athletics appearances (overview)
- 1983; 1987; 1991; 1993; 1995; 1997; 1999; 2001; 2003; 2005; 2007; 2009; 2011; 2013; 2015; 2017; 2019; 2022; 2023; 2025

Bahamas competed at the 2017 World Championships in Athletics in London, United Kingdom, 4–13 August 2017.

== Medalists ==
Medal	Name	Event	Date
Silver	Steven Gardiner	Men's 400 metres	8 August
Bronze	Shaunae Miller-Uibo	Women's 200 metres	11 August

== Results ==
=== Men ===
Track and road events

Athlete	Event	Preliminaries		Heat		Semifinal		Final	
Athlete	Event	Result	Rank	Result	Rank	Result	Rank	Result	Rank
Warren Fraser	100 metres	10.30	8 Q	10.42	38	Did not advance			
Teray Smith	200 metres	—N/a		20.77	33	Did not advance			
Steven Gardiner	400 metres	—N/a		44.75	2 Q	43.89 NR	1 Q	44.41	2nd place, silver medalist(s)
Warren Fraser; Shavez Hart; Sean Stuart; Teray Smith	4 × 100 metres relay	—N/a		DQ	–	—N/a		Did not advance	
Alonzo Russell; Michael Mathieu; O'Jay Ferguson; Ramon Miller	4 × 400 metres relay	—N/a		3:03.04 SB	11	—N/a		Did not advance	

Field events

Athlete	Event	Qualification		Final	
Athlete	Event	Distance	Position	Distance	Position
Donald Thomas	High jump	2.22	=22	Did not advance	

=== Women ===
Track and road events

Athlete	Event	Heat		Semifinal		Final	
Athlete	Event	Result	Rank	Result	Rank	Result	Rank
Tynia Gaither	200 metres	22.98	=9 Q	22.85	8 q	23.07	8
Shaunae Miller-Uibo	200 metres	22.69	2 Q	22.49	2 Q	22.15	3rd place, bronze medalist(s)
Anthonique Strachan	200 metres	23.23	15 Q	23.21	16	Did not advance	
Shaunae Miller-Uibo	400 metres	50.97	3 Q	50.36	3 Q	50.49	4
Devynne Charlton	100 metres hurdles	13.02	19 Q	12.95	13	Did not advance	
Devynne Charlton; Carmiesha Cox; Jenae Ambrose; Tynia Gaither	4 × 100 metres relay	DQ	–	—N/a		Did not advance	
Lanece Clarke; Christine Amertil; Anthonique Strachan; Shaquania Dorsett	4 × 400 metres relay	DNF	–	—N/a		Did not advance	

Field events

Athlete	Event	Qualification		Final	
Athlete	Event	Distance	Position	Distance	Position
Bianca Stuart	Long jump	5.91	28	Did not advance	
Tamara Myers	Triple jump	13.41	24	Did not advance	
