= Bahamas at the 2013 World Championships in Athletics =

- WA code: BAH

in Moscow
- Competitors: 26
- Medals: Gold 0 Silver 0 Bronze 0 Total 0

World Championships in Athletics appearances (overview)
- 1983; 1987; 1991; 1993; 1995; 1997; 1999; 2001; 2003; 2005; 2007; 2009; 2011; 2013; 2015; 2017; 2019; 2022; 2023; 2025

Bahamas is competing at the 2013 World Championships in Athletics in Moscow, Russia, from 10–18 August 2013. A team of 26 athletes was announced to represent the country in the event.

== Results ==
(q – qualified, NM – no mark, SB – season best)

=== Men ===
Track and road events

| Athlete | Event | Preliminaries | | Heats | | Semifinals | | Final | |
| Athlete | Event | Time | Rank | Time | Rank | Time | Rank | Time | Rank |
|---|---|---|---|---|---|---|---|---|---|
| Shavez Hart | 100 metres | | | 10.36 | 36 | did not advance | | | |
| Jamial Rolle | 200 metres | | | 21.40 | 44 | did not advance | | | |
| Chris Brown | 400 metres | | | 45.39 | =12 Q | 45.18 SB | 10 | did not advance | |
| Ramon Miller | 400 metres | | | 46.65 | 27 | did not advance | | | |
| LaToy Williams | 400 metres | | | 47.53 | 29 | did not advance | | | |
| Jeffery Gibson | 400 metres hurdles | | | 50.25 | 27 Q | 50.51 | 21 | did not advance | |
| Warren Fraser; Adrian Griffith; Shavez Hart; Trevorvano Mackey; Michael Mathieu; Jamial Rolle | 4 × 100 metres relay | | | 38.70 NR | 14 | | | did not advance | |
| Chris Brown; O'Jay Ferguson; Michael Mathieu; Ramon Miller; Wesley Neymour; LaToy Williams | 4 × 400 metres relay | | | 3:32.91 | 13 | | | did not advance | |

Field events

| Athlete | Event | Preliminaries | | Final | |
| Athlete | Event | Width Height | Rank | Width Height | Rank |
|---|---|---|---|---|---|
| Ryan Ingraham | High jump | 2.26 | =8 q | 2.25 | =10 |
| Donald Thomas | High jump | 2.29 | 5 q | 2.32 SB | 6 |

=== Women ===
Track and road events

| Athlete | Event | Preliminaries | | Heats | | Semifinals | | Final | |
| Athlete | Event | Time | Rank | Time | Rank | Time | Rank | Time | Rank |
|---|---|---|---|---|---|---|---|---|---|
| Caché Armbrister | 100 metres | | | 11.55 | 30 | did not advance | | | |
| Sheniqua Ferguson | 100 metres | | | 11.33 | 19 Q | 11.35 | 16 | did not advance | |
| Shaunae Miller | 200 metres | | | 22.72 | 5 Q | 22.64 | 5 Q | 22.74 | 4 |
| Nivea Smith | 200 metres | | | 23.25 | 27 | did not advance | | | |
| Anthonique Strachan | 200 metres | | | 22.66 | 3 Q | 22.81 | =9 | did not advance | |
| Caché Armbrister; Sheniqua Ferguson; Debbie Ferguson-McKenzie; Shaunae Miller; Nivea Smith; Anthonique Strachan | 4 × 100 metres relay | | | DQ | | | | DQ | |
| Miriam Byfield; Lanece Clarke; Shakeitha Henfield; Amara Jones; Cotrell Martin | 4 × 400 metres relay | | | 3:32.91 | 13 | | | did not advance | |

Field events

| Athlete | Event | Preliminaries | | Final | |
| Athlete | Event | Width Height | Rank | Width Height | Rank |
|---|---|---|---|---|---|
| Bianca Stuart | Long jump | 6.35 | 24 | did not advance | |
