= Bahamas at the 2015 World Championships in Athletics =

- WA code: BAH

in Beijing
- Competitors: 23
- Medals Ranked 22nd: Gold 0 Silver 1 Bronze 1 Total 2

World Championships in Athletics appearances (overview)
- 1983; 1987; 1991; 1993; 1995; 1997; 1999; 2001; 2003; 2005; 2007; 2009; 2011; 2013; 2015; 2017; 2019; 2022; 2023

The Bahamas competed at the 2015 World Championships in Athletics in Beijing, China, from 22 to 30 August 2015.

== Medalists ==
Medal	Athlete	Event	Date
Silver	Shaunae Miller	Women's 400 metres	27 August
Bronze	Jeffery Gibson	Men's 400 metres hurdles	25 August

== Results ==
(q – qualified, NM – no mark, SB – season best)

=== Men ===
Track and road events

Athlete	Event	Heat		Semifinal		Final	
Athlete	Event	Result	Rank	Result	Rank	Result	Rank
Teray Smith	200 metres	20.91	43	did not advance			
Chris Brown	400 metres	44.68	14 q	45.07	18	did not advance	
Michael Mathieu	400 metres	45.07	20 q	45.43	23	did not advance	
Steven Gardiner	400 metres	45.26	27 Q	44.98	16	did not advance	
Jeffery Gibson	400 metres hurdles	49.09	13 Q	48.37 NR	3 Q	48.17 NR	3rd place, bronze medalist(s)
Warren Fraser; Shavez Hart; Elroy McBride; Teray Smith	4 × 100 metres relay	38.96 SB	12	—		did not advance	
Steven Gardiner; Michael Mathieu; Alonzo Russell; Ramon Miller	4 × 400 metres relay	DQ		—		did not advance	

Field events

Athlete	Event	Qualification		Final	
Athlete	Event	Distance	Position	Distance	Position
Donald Thomas	High jump	2.29	10 q	2.29	6
Trevor Barry	High jump	2.29 SB	10 q	2.25	10
Ryan Ingraham	High jump	2.26	25	did not advance	
Leevan Sands	Triple jump	16.73	12 q	16.68	10
Latario Collie-Minns	Triple jump	16.21	23	did not advance	

=== Women ===
Track and road events

Athlete	Event	Heat		Semifinal		Final	
Athlete	Event	Result	Rank	Result	Rank	Result	Rank
Sheniqua Ferguson	100 metres	11.48	35	did not advance			
Sheniqua Ferguson	200 metres	23.44	42	did not advance			
Shaunae Miller	400 metres	50.53	5 Q	50.12	3 Q	49.67 PB	2nd place, silver medalist(s)
Devynne Charlton	100 metres hurdles	13.16	27	did not advance			
Adanaca Brown	100 metres hurdles	13.74	34	did not advance			
Lanece Clarke; Christine Amertil; Katrina Seymour; Shaunae Miller	4 × 400 metres relay	3:28.46 NR	10	—		did not advance	

Field events

Athlete	Event	Qualification		Final	
Athlete	Event	Distance	Position	Distance	Position
Bianca Stuart	Long jump	6.34	25	did not advance	
