= Athletics in the Bahamas =

Bahamas Athletics History

This article is about the Athletics in the Bahamas from the early 20th century to onward

In 70 years, The Bahamas has won 14 Olympic medals at the Olympics, 25 medals at the IAAF World Championships in Athletics, and numerous medals at the Pan American Games and the Commonwealth Games. Bahamas has a population of 393,450 people, making it the 170th most populous country in the world.

== 1950s ==
1954 Commonwealth Games in Vancouver, Canada

Irrington Isaacs came 7th in his heat in the 100-yard dash in a time of 10.7. He did not advance to the semifinals

Leonard Dames Ran 10.3 for 6th place in his heat, which meant he did not qualify for the semifinals. Dames would later run 23.9 in the 220-yard dash for 5th in his heat.

Cyril Johnson came 4th in his heat of the 440-yard dash with a time of 51.8. He did not progress to the semifinals. Johnson would later go on to place 8th in the 880-yard dash with a time of 2:10.2. He did not advance to the semifinals.

Irrington Isaacs placed 5th in his heat of the 440-yard dash with a time of 54.3. Issacs would not move on to the semifinals.

== Melbourne 1956 Olympics ==
Tom Robinson was the first athlete to compete in Track and Field at a Summer Olympics for the Bahamas. Robinson ran the 100m and 200m dash running times of 11.06 and 21.76 for a 4th place finish in both events. He did not advance to the next rounds

== Tokyo 1964 Olympics ==
Thomas A Robinson made the 100m final and placed 8th with a time of 10.5

== Munich 1972 Olympics ==
Claudette Powell placed 7th in her 100m heat in a time of 12.01. This would be the first woman to compete in the Olympic Games for the country.

== Los Angeles 1984 Olympics ==
The first women's 4 x 100 metres Relay team was fielded for the Bahamas. It consisted of Eldece Clarke-Lewis Pauline Davis-Thompson Debbie Greene and Oralee Fowler. They ran a time of 44.15 in their heat to qualify for the finals. They then placed 6th in the final with a time of 44.18.

== Seoul 1988 Olympics ==
Norbert Elliott was the sole athlete for the nation to make an Olympic final that year. He placed 10th with a jump of 16.19. Elliott is now Track & Field/Cross Country Head Coach at Purdue University.

== Barcelona 1992 Olympics ==
Frank Rutherford won the country's first ever medal in Track and Field placing third in the men's Triple Jump. He had a jump of 17.36.

== Atlanta 1996 Olympics ==
The Bahamas won a silver medal in the women's 4 x 100 metres relay. The team consisted Eldece Clark-Lewis, Chandra Sturrup, Sevatheda Fynes, Pauline Davis-Thompson and Debbie Ferguson. They ran a time of 42.14.

== Sydney 2000 Olympics ==
Pauline Davis initially won a silver medal behind Marion Jones in the women's 200m. 10 years later she was upgraded to Gold when Marion Jones was stripped of the medal due to using performance-enhancing drugs. Davis ran a time of 22.27

Davis would later team up with Savatheda Fynes, Chandra Sturrup, Debbie Ferguson-McKenzie and Eldece Clarke-Lewis to win the women's 4 x 100 Relay Gold in a time of 41.95. This was also the countries first Olympic gold medal in track and field.

The men's 4 x 400 m Relay were upgraded to the bronze medal after initially placing 4th. The United States was stripped of the gold medal after a doping offense. The team consisted of Avard Moncur, Troy McIntosh, Carl Oliver, Chris Brown, and Tim Munnings. They ran a time of 2:59:23.

== Athens 2004 Olympics ==
Tonique Williams-Darling won the women's 400m dash in a time of 49.42. This marks the first time in history the nation won an individual gold medal at the Olympics.

Debbie Ferguson won a bronze medal in the women's 200m dash. She ran a time of 22.30.

== Beijing 2008 Olympics ==
Leevan Sands picked up a bronze medal in the men's triple jump with a new national record jump of 17.59.

The Men's 4 × 400 metres relay team won a silver medal with a time of 2:58.03 behind the United States. The team consisted of Andretti Bain, Michael Mathieu, Andrae Williams, Chris Brown

== London 2012 Olympics ==
The Men's 4 × 400 metres relay won a gold medal beating the heavy pre-race favorites of the United States. This was only the 7th time in history since 1912 that the United States lost the event. The Bahamas also became the third-fastest nation in the event with a time of 2:56.72. The team consisted of Chris Brown, Demetrius Pinder, Michael Mathieu, and Ramon Miller.

== Rio 2016 Olympics ==
Shaunae Miller won the women's 400m Dash with a personal Best of 49.44.

The Men's 4 × 400 metres relay team won a bronze medal with a time of 2:58.49 behind the United States and Jamaica. The team consisted of Alonzo Russell, Michael Mathieu, Steven Gardiner, Chris Brown and Stephen Newbold.

== Tokyo 2020 Olympics ==
Steven Gardiner won the men's 400m dash at the 2020 edition of the games. He ran his second-fastest time of his career with a time of 43.85.

Shaunae Miller won the women's 400m dash a day later, successfully defending her title from 2016. She ran a national record time of 48.36.

=== 2021 ===
In January 2022 Steven Gardiner ran the fastest indoor 300m of all time with a time of 31.56.

== Youth athletic development in Bahamas ==
Most Bahamian schools have an athletics program in the curriculum, so Bahamian children are into athletics at a young age. On New Providence High schools compete separately in two Divisions Inter-school wise. Bahamas Association of Independent Secondary Schools "BAISS" and Government Secondary Schools Sports Association "GSSSA". Once these champions of those two divisions have concluded, they compete on a National level joining the other high schools from the different islands in the Bahamas at the "Bahamas National High School Track and Field Championships".

Grand Bahama Island is governed by the Grand Bahama Secondary Schools Sports Association (GBSSSA). Like their Nassau counterparts they stage their own track and field championships between the schools on that island before competing on the national level.

In addition to the inter-school track meets, there are numerous Club and Open meets hosted throughout the year on numerous islands. These youth and junior athletes are usually trying to qualify for the first big regional track and field championships the Carifta Games. Carifta is usually hosted on Easter weekends and has produced many world-class athletes over the years. Athletes are also selected to run at World Athletics U20 Championships, IAAF World Youth Championships in Athletics, Central American and Caribbean Junior Championships in Athletics, Pan American U20 Athletics Championships, Youth Olympic Games and the Commonwealth Youth Games.

The Primary school level in Nassau would be Nassau Primary "NPPASSA" Championships and "GBPSSA" Primary Schools Grand Bahama.

=== Top 5 Bahamian 100 m athletes — women ===
Updated 29 January 2022

Rank	Time	Athlete	Nation	Date	Location
1.	10.85	Chandra Sturrup	Bahamas	5 July 2005	Lausanne, Switzerland
2.	10.91	Savatheda Fynes	Bahamas	2 July 1999	Lausanne, Switzerland
3.	10.91	Debbie Ferguson-McKenzie	Bahamas	27 July 2002	Manchester, England
4.	10.96	Eldece Clarke-Lewis	Bahamas	29 April 2000	Fort-de-France, Martinique
5.	10.97	Pauline Davis-Thompson	Bahamas	21 July 2000	Nassau, The Bahamas

=== Top 5 Bahamian 100 m athletes — men ===
Updated 29 January 2022

Rank	Time	Athlete	Nation	Date	Location
1	9.91	Derrick Atkins	Bahamas	26 August 2007	Osaka, Japan
2	10.01	Samson Colebrooke	Bahamas	5 July 2019	Queretaro, Mexico
3	10.10	Shavez Hart	Bahamas	18 April 2015	Waco, Texas
4	10.11	Adrian Griffith	Bahamas	11 June 2016	Montverde, Florida
5	10.14	Warren Fraser	Bahamas	27 June 2014	Nassau, The Bahamas

== See also ==
- Bahamas at the Olympics
- Bahamas at the Commonwealth Games
- Bahamas at the Pan American Games
- Bahamas at the World Athletics Championships
- CARIFTA Games
