= Bahamas at the 2025 World Athletics Championships =

- Flag of the Bahamas
- WA code: BAH

in Tokyo, Japan 13 September 2025 – 21 September 2025
- Competitors: 15 (6 men and 9 women)
- Medals: Gold 0 Silver 0 Bronze 0 Total 0

World Athletics Championships appearances (overview)
- 1983; 1987; 1991; 1993; 1995; 1997; 1999; 2001; 2003; 2005; 2007; 2009; 2011; 2013; 2015; 2017; 2019; 2022; 2023; 2025

Bahamas competed at the 2025 World Athletics Championships in Tokyo, Japan, from 13 to 21 September 2025.

== Results ==
Bahamas entered 15 athletes.

Key

- Q = Qualified for the next round
- q = Qualified for the next round as a fastest loser or, in field events, by position without achieving the qualifying target
- NR = National record
- PB = Personal best
- SB = Season best
- N/A = Round not applicable for the event

=== Men ===
Track and road events

Athlete	Event	Heat		Semifinal		Final	
Athlete	Event	Result	Rank	Result	Rank	Result	Rank
Terrence Jones	100 metres	10.16	3 Q	10.10	6	Did not advance	
Ian Kerr	200 metres	20.92	7	Did not advance			

Field events

Athlete	Event	Qualification		Final	
Athlete	Event	Distance	Position	Distance	Position
Donald Thomas	High jump	2.21	19	Did not advance	
Kaiwan Culmer	Triple jump	16.39	23	Did not advance	
Keyshawn Strachan	Javelin throw	80.03	22	Did not advance	

Combined events – Decathlon

Athlete	Event	100 m	LJ	SP	HJ	400 m	110H	DT	PV	JT	1500 m	Final	Rank
Kendrick Thompson	Result	10.67	7.54	12.56	2.02	47.93	14.15	36.10	4.60	68.02	4:32.26	8175	8
Kendrick Thompson	Points	935	945	640	822	913	955	586	790	859	730	8175	8

=== Women ===
Track and road events

Athlete	Event	Heat		Semifinal		Final	
Athlete	Event	Result	Rank	Result	Rank	Result	Rank
Anthaya Charlton	100 metres	11.18	5 q	11.14	6	Did not advance	
Camille Rutherford	100 metres	11.40	5	Did not advance			
Anthonique Strachan	200 metres	22.57 SB	2 Q	22.48 SB	4 q	Disqualified	
Printassia Johnson	400 metres	50.53 PB	4 q	50.81	6	Did not advance	
Javonya Valcourt	400 metres	52.00	7	Did not advance			
Denisha Cartwright	100 metres hurdles	13.50	7	Did not advance			
Devynne Charlton	100 metres hurdles	12.69	2 Q	12.51 SB	3 q	12.49 SB	6
Charisma Taylor	100 metres hurdles	12.96	6	Did not advance			

Field events

Athlete	Event	Qualification		Final	
Athlete	Event	Distance	Position	Distance	Position
Rhema Otabor	Javelin throw	60.06	15	Did not advance	
