= Bahamas at the 2011 World Championships in Athletics =

- WA code: BAH
- National federation: Bahamas Association of Athletic Associations
- Website: www.bahamastrack.com

in Daegu
- Competitors: 17
- Medals: Gold 0 Silver 0 Bronze 1 Total 1

World Championships in Athletics appearances (overview)
- 1983; 1987; 1991; 1993; 1995; 1997; 1999; 2001; 2003; 2005; 2007; 2009; 2011; 2013; 2015; 2017; 2019; 2022; 2023

The Bahamas competed at the 2011 World Championships in Athletics from August 27 to September 4 in Daegu, South Korea.

== Team selection ==
The Bahamas Association of Athletic Associations announced a team of 18 athletes based upon a mixture of experience and youth to compete at the championships. The team will be led by former World 200m champion and Olympic bronze medalist Debbie Ferguson-McKenzie, former World High Jump champion Donald Thomas, and Triple Jump Olympic bronze medalist Leevan Sands.

The following athletes appeared on the preliminary Entry List, but not on the Official Start List of the specific event, resulting in total number of 17 competitors:

KEY:	Did not participate	Competed in another event

	Event	Athlete
Men	4 x 400 metres relay	Michael Mathieu
Men	4 x 400 metres relay	Demetrius Pinder
Men	4 x 400 metres relay	Chris Brown
Women	100 metres	Debbie Ferguson-McKenzie
Women	100 metres	Anthonique Strachan
Women	4 x 100 metres relay	Bianca Stuart
Women	4 x 100 metres relay	Caché Armbrister

== Medalists ==
The following Bahamian competitor won a medal at the Championships

Medal	Athlete	Event
Bronze	Trevor Barry	High jump

== Results ==
=== Men ===
Athlete	Event	Preliminaries		Heats		Semifinals		Final	
Athlete	Event	Time Width Height	Rank	Time Width Height	Rank	Time Width Height	Rank	Time Width Height	Rank
Adrian Griffith	100 metres			Disqualified		Did not advance			
Michael Mathieu	200 metres			20.46	4 Q	Did not finish		Did not advance	
Chris Brown	400 metres			45.29	11 Q	45.54	11	Did not advance	
Demetrius Pinder	400 metres			45.53	20 Q	45.87	15	Did not advance	
Ramon Miller	400 metres			45.31 SB	13 Q	45.88	16	Did not advance	
Ramon Miller; Avard Moncur; Andrae Williams; LaToy Williams	4 x 400 metres relay			3:01.54	9			Did not advance	
Raymond Higgs	Long jump	7.72	25					Did not advance	
Leevan Sands	Triple jump	17.13 SB	6 Q					17.21	7
Trevor Barry	High jump	2.28	11 q					2.32 PB	3rd place, bronze medalist(s)
Donald Thomas	High jump	2.31	7 Q					2.20	11

=== Women ===
Athlete	Event	Preliminaries		Heats		Semifinals		Final	
Athlete	Event	Time Width Height	Rank	Time Width Height	Rank	Time Width Height	Rank	Time Width Height	Rank
Sheniqua Ferguson	100 metres			11.35	23 Q	11.59	22	Did not advance	
Debbie Ferguson-McKenzie	200 metres			22.86	10 Q	22.85	7 q	22.96	6
Nivea Smith	200 metres			23.09	17 Q	23.06	15	Did not advance	
Anthonique Strachan	200 metres			23.20	21 Q	23.85	23	Did not advance	
Sheniqua Ferguson; Nivea Smith; Anthonique Strachan; Debbie Ferguson-McKenzie	4 x 100 metres relay			50.62	18			Did not advance	
Bianca Stuart	Long jump	6.44	17					Did not advance	
