= Bahamas at the 2022 World Athletics Championships =

- Flag of the Bahamas
- WA code: BAH
- National federation: Bahamas Association of Athletic Associations

in Eugene, United States 15–24 July 2022
- Competitors: 17 (9 men and 8 women)
- Medals Ranked 22nd: Gold 1 Silver 0 Bronze 0 Total 1

World Athletics Championships appearances (overview)
- 1983; 1987; 1991; 1993; 1995; 1997; 1999; 2001; 2003; 2005; 2007; 2009; 2011; 2013; 2015; 2017; 2019; 2022; 2023; 2025

Bahamas competed at the 2022 World Athletics Championships in Eugene, United States, from 15 to 24 July 2022. Bahamas entered 17 athletes.

== Medalists ==
Medal	Athlete	Event	Date
Gold	Shaunae Miller-Uibo	400 metres	July 22

== Entrants ==
- including alternates

=== Men ===
Track and road events

Athlete	Event	Preliminary		Heat		Semi-final		Final	
Athlete	Event	Result	Rank	Result	Rank	Result	Rank	Result	Rank
Samson Colebrooke	100 metres	—		10.23 (+1.1)	38	Did not advance			
Terrence Jones	100 metres	—		DNS		Did not advance			
Steven Gardiner	400 metres	—		DNS		Did not advance			

Field events

Athlete	Event	Qualification		Final	
Athlete	Event	Distance	Position	Distance	Position
Donald Thomas	High jump	2.21	23	Did not advance	
LaQuan Nairn	Long jump	7.80	18	Did not advance	

Combined events – Decathlon

Athlete	Event	100 m	LJ	SP	HJ	400 m	110H	DT	PV	JT	1500 m	Final	Rank
Ken Mullings	Result	10.83	6.96 SB	13.83	2.05	49.25 SB	14.02 PB	42.70	4.50	56.92 SB	4:52.85 SB	7866 NR	17
Ken Mullings	Points	899	804	718	850	849	972	720	760	692	602	7866 NR	17

=== Women ===
Track and road events

Athlete	Event	Heat		Semi-final		Final	
Athlete	Event	Result	Rank	Result	Rank	Result	Rank
Tynia Gaither	100 metres	11.16 (−0.2)	18 q	DQ		Did not advance	
Anthonique Strachan	100 metres	11.03 (−0.2)	13 Q	10.98 (−0.2) PR	10	Did not advance	
Tynia Gaither	200 metres	22.61 (+0.4)	13 Q	22.41 (+2.0) PR	11	Did not advance	
Shaunae Miller-Uibo	200 metres	DNS		Did not advance			
Anthonique Strachan	200 metres	1:50.06 (+1.9)	44	Did not advance			
Shaunae Miller-Uibo	400 metres	51.10	9 Q	49.55 SB	1 Q	49.11 WL	1st place, gold medalist(s)
Devynne Charlton	100 metres hurdles	12.69	7 Q	12.46 NR	7 Q	12.53	7
Jenae Ambrose; Doneisha Anderson; Shaunae Miller-Uibo; Megan Moss; Anthonique Strachan; Javonya Valcourt	4 × 400 metres relay	Did not start		—		Did not advance	

=== Mixed ===
Track and road events

Athlete	Event	Heat		Final	
Athlete	Event	Result	Rank	Result	Rank
Doneisha Anderson; Bradley Dormeus; Megan Moss; Alonzo Russell,	4 × 400 metres relay	3:19.73 SB	15	Did not advance	
