= Bahamas at the 2009 World Championships in Athletics =

- WA code: BAH

in Berlin
- Competitors: 15 (11 men, 4 women)
- Medals: Gold 0 Silver 1 Bronze 1 Total 2

World Championships in Athletics appearances (overview)
- 1983; 1987; 1991; 1993; 1995; 1997; 1999; 2001; 2003; 2005; 2007; 2009; 2011; 2013; 2015; 2017; 2019; 2022; 2023

Bahamas competes at the 2009 World Championships in Athletics from 15–23 August in Berlin.

== Team selection ==
Track and road events

Event	Athletes	
Event	Men	Women
100 metres	Derrick Atkins; Adrian Griffith	Chandra Sturrup; Debbie Ferguson-McKenzie; Sheniqua Ferguson
200 metres	Derrick Atkins; Nathaniel McKinney	Debbie Ferguson-McKenzie; Sheniqua Ferguson
400 metres	Michael Mathieu; Latroy Williams; Chris Brown; Ramon Miller	Christine Amertil
110 metre hurdles	Shamar Sands	
4 x 100 metres relay		TBA
4 x 400 metres relay	TBA	TBA

Field and combined events

Event	Athletes	
Event	Men	Women
High jump	Trevor Barry; Donald Thomas	
Triple jump	Leevan Sands	
