= 2014 IAAF World Indoor Championships – Men's 60 metres =

Men's 60 metres at the 2014 IAAF World Indoor Championships
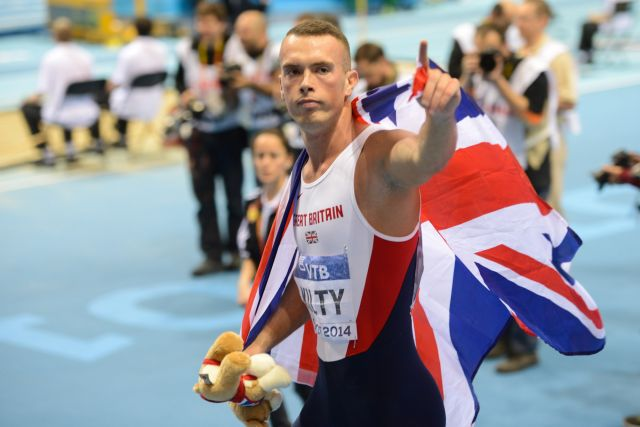
- Kilty after the winning the final.
- Venue: Ergo Arena
- Dates: 7 March (heats); 8 March (semifinals and final)
- Competitors: 44 from 33 nations
- Winning time: 6.49

Medalists
gold medal	Richard Kilty	Great Britain
silver medal	Marvin Bracy	United States
bronze medal	Femi Ogunode	Qatar

The men's 60 metres at the 2014 IAAF World Indoor Championships took place on 7–8 March 2014. Richard Kilty won the gold medal.

== Records ==
Standing records prior to the 2014 IAAF World Indoor Championships
World record	Maurice Greene (USA)	6.39	Madrid, Spain	3 February 1998
World record	Maurice Greene (USA)	6.39	Atlanta, United States	3 March 2001
Championship record	Maurice Greene (USA)	6.42	Maebashi, Japan	7 March 1999
World Leading	James Dasaolu (GBR)	6.47	Birmingham, Great Britain	15 February 2014
African record	Leonard Myles-Mills (GHA)	6.45	Colorado Springs, United States	20 February 1999
Asian record	Tosin Ogunode (QAT)	6.50	Flagstaff, United States	25 January 2014
European record	Dwain Chambers (GBR)	6.42	Turin, Italy	7 March 2009
North and Central American and Caribbean record	Maurice Greene (USA)	6.39	Madrid, Spain	3 February 1998
North and Central American and Caribbean record	Maurice Greene (USA)	6.39	Atlanta, United States	3 March 2001
Oceanian record	Matt Shirvington (AUS)	6.52	Maebashi, Japan	7 March 1999
South American record	José Carlos Moreira (BRA)	6.52	Paris, France	13 February 2009

== Qualification standards ==
Indoor	Outdoor
6.65	10.15 (100 m)

== Schedule ==
Date	Time	Round
7 March 2014	18:35	Heats
8 March 2014	18:30	Semifinals
8 March 2014	21:00	Final

== Results ==
=== Heats ===
Qualification: First 3 in each heat (Q) and the next 6 fastest (q) qualified for the semifinal.

Rank	Heat	Lane	Name	Nationality	Time	Notes
1	4	8	Richard Kilty	Great Britain	6.53	Q, PB
2	6	8	Dwain Chambers	Great Britain	6.57	Q
3	5	5	Lucas Jakubczyk	Germany	6.57	Q
=4	2	2	Su Bingtian	China	6.58	Q
=4	4	2	Nesta Carter	Jamaica	6.58	Q
=4	4	6	Reza Ghasemi	Iran	6.58	Q, NR
=4	5	4	Dariusz Kuć	Poland	6.58	Q, PB
=8	1	8	Gerald Phiri	Zambia	6.59	Q
=8	1	7	Kimmari Roach	Jamaica	6.59	Q, PB
=8	3	3	Jason Rogers	Saint Kitts and Nevis	6.59	Q
11	1	5	Marvin Bracy	United States	6.60	Q
12	3	7	Warren Fraser	Bahamas	6.61	Q
13	6	6	Adam Harris	Guyana	6.62	Q
=14	5	7	Femi Ogunode	Qatar	6.63	Q
=14	6	3	Gavin Smellie	Canada	6.63	Q
=14	6	4	Brijesh Lawrence	Saint Kitts and Nevis	6.63	q
17	6	7	Gabriel Mvumvure	Zimbabwe	6.64	q, PB
=18	2	6	Yoshihide Kiryū	Japan	6.65	Q
=18	3	1	Zhang Peimeng	China	6.65	Q, SB
20	1	6	Fabio Cerutti	Italy	6.67	q
21	2	5	Trell Kimmons	United States	6.68	Q
=22	2	7	Hassan Taftian	Iran	6.69	q, PB
=22	4	4	Barakat Al-Harthi	Oman	6.69	q, SB
=22	3	2	Remigiusz Olszewski	Poland	6.69	q
=22	4	3	Samuel Francis	Qatar	6.69	
=22	5	6	Adrian Griffith	Bahamas	6.69	
27	2	3	Adam Zavacký	Slovakia	6.71	
28	2	8	Odain Rose	Sweden	6.71	
29	1	2	Tom Kling-Baptiste	Sweden	6.72	
30	3	5	T.J. Lawrence	Canada	6.74	
31	4	7	Calvin Kang Li Loong	Singapore	6.75	PB
32	5	3	Rolando Palacios	Honduras	6.78	SB
33	5	2	Paul Williams	Grenada	6.82	
34	1	4	Sibusiso Matsenjwa	Swaziland	6.88	NR
35	1	3	Jean Thierie Ferdinand	Mauritius	6.98	PB
36	6	2	Riste Pandev	Macedonia	7.00	
37	2	4	Cristian Leguizamón	Paraguay	7.02	PB
38	6	5	Faresa Kapisi	American Samoa	7.14	NR
39	4	5	Benjamín Véliz	Nicaragua	7.27	NR
40	3	8	Gregory Bradai	French Polynesia	7.30	PB
41	5	8	Ddoyd Brown	Aruba	7.47	PB
42	3	4	Yondan Namelo	Micronesia	7.56	PB
43	4	1	Jamodre Lalita	Marshall Islands	7.72	PB
	3	6	Solomon Bockarie	Sierra Leone	DNS	

=== Semifinals ===
Qualification: First 2 in each heat (Q) and the next 2 fastest (q) qualified for the final.

Rank	Heat	Lane	Name	Nationality	Time	Notes
1	1	8	Nesta Carter	Jamaica	6.50	Q, SB
=2	1	4	Richard Kilty	Great Britain	6.52	Q, PB
=2	3	8	Marvin Bracy	United States	6.52	Q
=4	2	7	Femi Ogunode	Qatar	6.55	Q
=4	2	3	Kimmari Roach	Jamaica	6.55	Q, PB
=6	2	4	Su Bingtian	China	6.57	q, SB
=6	3	6	Gerald Phiri	Zambia	6.57	Q, NR
8	2	6	Dwain Chambers	Great Britain	6.58	q
=9	2	5	Warren Fraser	Bahamas	6.59	
=9	3	5	Adam Harris	Guyana	6.59	
=11	3	4	Lucas Jakubczyk	Germany	6.60	
=11	3	3	Dariusz Kuć	Poland	6.60	
=11	1	1	Gabriel Mvumvure	Zimbabwe	6.60	NR
=14	1	7	Trell Kimmons	United States	6.62	
=14	1	6	Jason Rogers	Saint Kitts and Nevis	6.62	
=14	1	3	Yoshihide Kiryū	Japan	6.62	
=14	1	5	Reza Ghasemi	Iran	6.62	
18	1	2	Remigiusz Olszewski	Poland	6.66	
19	2	2	Hassan Taftian	Iran	6.67	PB
=20	3	1	Brijesh Lawrence	Saint Kitts and Nevis	6.68	
=20	3	2	Barakat Al-Harthi	Oman	6.68	SB
22	3	7	Zhang Peimeng	China	6.70	
23	2	1	Fabio Cerutti	Italy	6.71	
24	2	8	Gavin Smellie	Canada	6.74	

=== Final ===
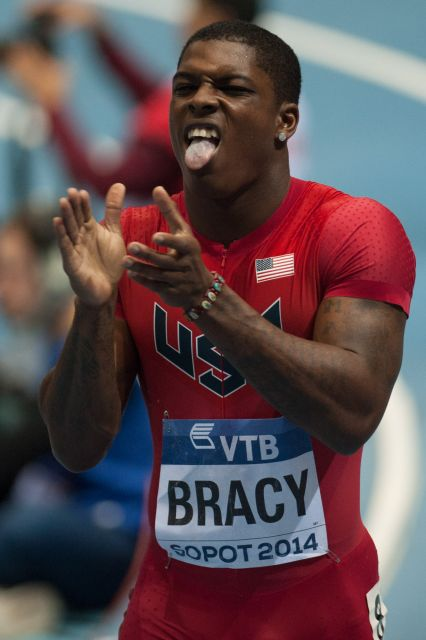
Marvin Bracy took the silver for the USA.

Rank	Lane	Name	Nationality	Time	Notes
1st place, gold medalist(s)	3	Richard Kilty	Great Britain	6.49	PB
2nd place, silver medalist(s)	6	Marvin Bracy	United States	6.51	
3rd place, bronze medalist(s)	5	Femi Ogunode	Qatar	6.52	
4	1	Su Bingtian	China	6.52	NR
5	7	Gerald Phiri	Zambia	6.52	NR
6	2	Dwain Chambers	Great Britain	6.53	
7	4	Nesta Carter	Jamaica	6.57	
8	8	Kimmari Roach	Jamaica	6.58	
