= Bahamas at the 2023 World Athletics Championships =

- Flag of the Bahamas
- WA code: BAH

in Budapest, Hungary 19 August 2023 – 27 August 2023
- Competitors: 11 (6 men and 5 women)
- Medals: Gold 0 Silver 0 Bronze 0 Total 0

World Athletics Championships appearances (overview)
- 1983; 1987; 1991; 1993; 1995; 1997; 1999; 2001; 2003; 2005; 2007; 2009; 2011; 2013; 2015; 2017; 2019; 2022; 2023

The Bahamas competed at the 2023 World Athletics Championships in Budapest, Hungary, from 19 to 27 August 2023.

== Results ==
Bahamas entered 11 athletes.

Key

- Q = Qualified for the next round
- q = Qualified for the next round as a fastest loser or, in field events, by position without achieving the qualifying target
- NR = National record
- PB = Personal best
- SB = Season best
- N/A = Round not applicable for the event

=== Men ===
Track and road events

Athlete	Event	Heat		Semifinal		Final	
Athlete	Event	Result	Rank	Result	Rank	Result	Rank
Terrence Jones	100 metres	10.32	6	Did not advance			
Steven Gardiner	400 metres	44.65	1 Q	DNF		Did not advance	
Alonzo Russell	400 metres	46.95	6	Did not advance			
Shakeem Hall-Smith	400 metres hurdles	49.61	7	Did not advance			

Field events

Athlete	Event	Qualification		Final	
Athlete	Event	Distance	Position	Distance	Position
Donald Thomas	High jump	2.25	16	Did not advance	
LaQuan Nairn	Long jump	NM		Did not advance	

=== Women ===
Track and road events

Athlete	Event	Heat		Semifinal		Final	
Athlete	Event	Result	Rank	Result	Rank	Result	Rank
Anthonique Strachan	100 metres	—					
Anthonique Strachan	200 metres	22.31	1 Q	22.30	3 q	22.29	6
Shaunae Miller-Uibo	400 metres	52.65 SB	7	Did not advance			
Devynne Charlton	100 metres hurdles	12.44 NR	2 Q	12.49	2 Q	12.52	4

Field events

Athlete	Event	Qualification		Final	
Athlete	Event	Distance	Position	Distance	Position
Charisma Taylor	Triple jump	13.51	29	Did not advance	
Rhema Otabor	Javelin throw	53.62	33	Did not advance	
