= 2017 World Championships in Athletics – Men's 400 metres =

Men's 400 metres at the 2017 World Championships
- Venue: Olympic Stadium
- Dates: 5 August (heats); 6 August (semifinal); 8 August (final)
- Competitors: 51 from 33 nations
- Winning time: 43.98

Medalists
gold medal	Wayde van Niekerk	South Africa
silver medal	Steven Gardiner	Bahamas
bronze medal	Abdalelah Haroun	Qatar

Video on YouTube Official Video

The men's 400 metres at the 2017 World Championships in Athletics was held at the London Olympic Stadium on 5, 6, and 8 August. The winning margin was 0.43 seconds.

== Summary ==
Isaac Makwala (Botswana) had qualified for the final, but was barred from competing as he was under quarantine due to the norovirus outbreak in one of the athletes' hotels. Steven Gardiner (Bahamas) started fastest, with Wayde van Niekerk (South Africa) equal to him by about 200 metres, and going on to build a lead through the final turn. Van Niekerk had time to slow down, winning comfortably ahead of Gardiner, with Abdalelah Haroun (Qatar) finishing quickly from dead last off the turn to claim bronze.

== Records ==
Before the competition records were as follows:

Record	Perf.	Athlete	Nat.	Date	Location
World	43.03	Wayde van Niekerk	RSA	14 Aug 2016	Rio de Janeiro, Brazil
Championship	43.18	Michael Johnson	USA	26 Aug 1999	Sevilla, Spain
World leading	43.62	Wayde van Niekerk	RSA	6 Jul 2017	Lausanne, Switzerland
African	43.03	Wayde van Niekerk	RSA	14 Aug 2016	Rio de Janeiro, Brazil
Asian	43.93	Yousef Masrahi	KSA	23 Aug 2015	Beijing, China
NACAC	43.18	Michael Johnson	USA	26 Aug 1999	Seville, Spain
South American	44.29	Sanderlei Parrela	BRA	26 Aug 1999	Seville, Spain
European	44.33	Thomas Schönlebe	GDR	3 Sep 1987	Rome, Italy
Oceanian	44.38	Darren Clark	AUS	26 Sep 1988	Seoul, South Korea

The following records were set at the competition:

Record	Perf.	Athlete	Nat.	Date
Bahamian	43.89	Steven Gardiner	BAH	6 Aug 2017

== Qualification standard ==
The standard to qualify automatically for entry was 45.50.

== Schedule ==
The event schedule, in local time (UTC+1), was as follows:

Date	Time	Round
5 August	10:45	Heats
6 August	19:40	Semifinals
8 August	21:50	Final

== Results ==
=== Heats ===
The first round took place on 5 August in six heats as follows:

Heat	1	2	3	4	5	6
Start time	10:45	10:53	11:02	11:11	11:21	11:29
Photo finish	link	link	link	link	link	link

The first three in each heat ( Q ) and the next six fastest ( q ) qualified for the semifinals. The overall results were as follows:

Rank	Heat	Lane	Name	Nationality	Time	Notes
1	5	6	Isaac Makwala	Botswana	44.55	Q
2	4	7	Steven Gardiner	Bahamas	44.75	Q
3	3	6	Baboloki Thebe	Botswana	44.82	Q
4	6	6	Nathon Allen	Jamaica	44.91	Q
5	1	7	Fred Kerley	United States	44.92	Q
6	6	3	Gil Roberts	United States	44.92	Q
7	3	8	Demish Gaye	Jamaica	44.92	Q
8	5	9	LaShawn Merritt	United States	45.00	Q
9	1	8	Lalonde Gordon	Trinidad and Tobago	45.02	Q, SB
10	5	2	Jamal Walton	Cayman Islands	45.05	Q
11	1	6	Kevin Borlée	Belgium	45.09	Q
12	1	9	Pavel Maslák	Czech Republic	45.10	q, SB
13	4	5	Wilbert London	United States	45.10	Q
14	5	5	Óscar Husillos	Spain	45.22	q, PB
15	6	9	Abdalelah Haroun	Qatar	45.27	Q
16	2	5	Wayde van Niekerk	South Africa	45.27	Q
17	1	5	Matthew Hudson-Smith	Great Britain & N.I.	45.31	q
18	4	4	Brian Gregan	Ireland	45.37	Q
19	3	3	Dwayne Cowan	Great Britain & N.I.	45.39	Q
20	3	7	Boniface Ontuga Mweresa	Kenya	45.58	q
21	3	9	Rafał Omelko	Poland	45.69	q
22	4	9	Jonathan Borlée	Belgium	45.70	q
23	2	2	Davide Re	Italy	45.71	Q
24	4	8	Luguelín Santos	Dominican Republic	45.73	
25	5	3	Raymond Kibet	Kenya	45.75	
26	5	8	Martyn Rooney	Great Britain & N.I.	45.75	
27	2	3	Machel Cedenio	Trinidad and Tobago	45.77	Q
28	1	4	Lucas Carvalho	Brazil	45.86	
29	4	3	Mamoudou Hanne	France	45.89	
30	2	4	Teddy Atine-Venel	France	45.90	
31	2	6	Yoandys Lescay	Cuba	45.93	
32	5	7	Renny Quow	Trinidad and Tobago	45.95	
33	6	4	Mohammad Anas	India	45.98	
34	1	3	Lucas Búa	Spain	46.00	
35	5	1	Winston George	Guyana	46.02	
36	2	1	Luka Janežič	Slovenia	46.06	
37	1	2	Collins Omae Gichana	Kenya	46.10	
38	2	9	Steven Solomon	Australia	46.27	
39	3	4	Samuel García	Spain	46.37	
40	3	2	Pieter Conradie	South Africa	46.62	
41	6	5	Samson Oghenewegba Nathaniel	Nigeria	46.63	
42	3	1	Warren Hazel	Saint Kitts and Nevis	46.96	
43	2	7	Kimorie Shearman	Saint Vincent and the Grenadines	47.05	
44	4	2	Yilmar Herrera	Colombia	47.18	
45	6	8	Takamasa Kitagawa	Japan	47.35	
46	6	7	Karabo Sibanda	Botswana	47.44	
47	1	1	Bachir Mahamat	Chad	47.50	
48	5	4	Sailosi Tubuilagi	Fiji	48.98	
49	3	5	Narek Ghukasyan	Armenia	49.70	SB
	2	8	Nery Brenes	Costa Rica	DQ	R 163.3(a)
	4	6	Steven Gayle	Jamaica	DQ	R 163.3(a)
	6	2	Emmanuel Dasor	Ghana	DNS	

=== Semifinals ===
The semifinals took place on 6 August in three heats as follows:

Heat	1	2	3
Start time	19:40	19:45	19:56
Photo finish	link	link	link

The first two in each heat ( Q ) and the next two fastest ( q ) qualified for the final. The overall results were as follows:

Rank	Heat	Lane	Name	Nationality	Time	Notes
1	1	5	Steven Gardiner	Bahamas	43.89	Q, NR
2	1	6	Nathon Allen	Jamaica	44.19	Q, PB
3	2	6	Wayde van Niekerk	South Africa	44.22	Q
4	3	5	Isaac Makwala	Botswana	44.30	Q
5	2	5	Baboloki Thebe	Botswana	44.33	Q
6	1	7	Fred Kerley	United States	44.51	q
7	3	6	Demish Gaye	Jamaica	44.55	Q, PB
8	2	9	Abdalelah Haroun	Qatar	44.64	q, SB
9	2	2	Matthew Hudson-Smith	Great Britain & N.I.	44.74	SB
10	3	7	Gil Roberts	United States	44.84	
11	1	9	Kevin Borlée	Belgium	45.10	
12	1	4	Wilbert London	United States	45.12	
13	3	9	Jamal Walton	Cayman Islands	45.16	
14	1	3	Óscar Husillos	Spain	45.16	PB
15	2	4	Lalonde Gordon	Trinidad and Tobago	45.20	
16	3	3	Jonathan Borlée	Belgium	45.23	
17	3	2	Pavel Maslák	Czech Republic	45.24	
18	1	2	Rafał Omelko	Poland	45.37	
19	2	8	Brian Gregan	Ireland	45.42	
20	2	7	LaShawn Merritt	United States	45.52	
21	3	8	Machel Cedenio	Trinidad and Tobago	45.91	
22	2	3	Boniface Ontuga Mweresa	Kenya	45.93	
23	3	4	Davide Re	Italy	45.95	
24	1	8	Dwayne Cowan	Great Britain & N.I.	45.96	

=== Final ===
The final took place on 8 August at 21:54. The results were as follows (photo finish):

Rank	Lane	Name	Nationality	Time	Notes
1st place, gold medalist(s)	6	Wayde van Niekerk	South Africa	43.98	
2nd place, silver medalist(s)	4	Steven Gardiner	Bahamas	44.41	
3rd place, bronze medalist(s)	3	Abdalelah Haroun	Qatar	44.48	SB
4	9	Baboloki Thebe	Botswana	44.66	
5	5	Nathon Allen	Jamaica	44.88	
6	8	Demish Gaye	Jamaica	45.04	
7	2	Fred Kerley	United States	45.23	
	7	Isaac Makwala	Botswana	DNS	
