= Bahamas at the 2019 World Athletics Championships =

- WA code: BAH

in Doha, Qatar 27 September 2019 – 6 October 2019
- Competitors: 9 (6 men and 3 women) in 7 events
- Medals Ranked 15th: Gold 1 Silver 1 Bronze 0 Total 2

World Athletics Championships appearances (overview)
- 1983; 1987; 1991; 1993; 1995; 1997; 1999; 2001; 2003; 2005; 2007; 2009; 2011; 2013; 2015; 2017; 2019; 2022; 2023

Bahamas competed at the 2019 World Athletics Championships in Doha, Qatar, from 27 September to 6 October 2019. Bahamas will be represented by 9 athletes.

== Medalists ==
Medal	Athlete	Event	Date
Gold	Steven Gardiner	Men's 400 metres	October 4
Silver	Verena Preiner	Women's 400 metres	October 3

== Results ==
=== Men ===
Track and road events

Athlete	Event	Heat		Semifinal		Final	
Athlete	Event	Result	Rank	Result	Rank	Result	Rank
Terrance Jones	200 metres	DQ		did not advance			
Steven Gardiner	400 metres	45.68	18 Q	44.13 SB	1 Q	43.48 NR	1st place, gold medalist(s)
Alonzo Russell	400 metres	45.91	25	did not advance			

Field events

Athlete	Event	Qualification		Final	
Athlete	Event	Result	Rank	Result	Rank
Donald Thomas	High jump	2.22	19	did not advance	
Latario Collie-Minns	Triple jump	16.26	28	did not advance	
Lathone Collie-Minns	Triple jump	15.89	30	did not advance	

=== Women ===
Track and road events

Athlete	Event	Heat		Semifinal		Final	
Athlete	Event	Result	Rank	Result	Rank	Result	Rank
Tynia Gaither	100 metres	11.24	16 q	11.20	13	did not advance	
Tynia Gaither	200 metres	22.57 SB	5 Q	22.57 SB	6 Q	22.90	8
Anthonique Strachan	200 metres	22.86	15 Q	25.44	23	did not advance	
Shaunae Miller-Uibo	400 metres	51.30	9 Q	49.66	1 Q	48.37 NR	2nd place, silver medalist(s)
