= 2022 World Athletics Championships – Women's 400 metres =

Athletics event

Women's 400 metres at the 2022 World Championships
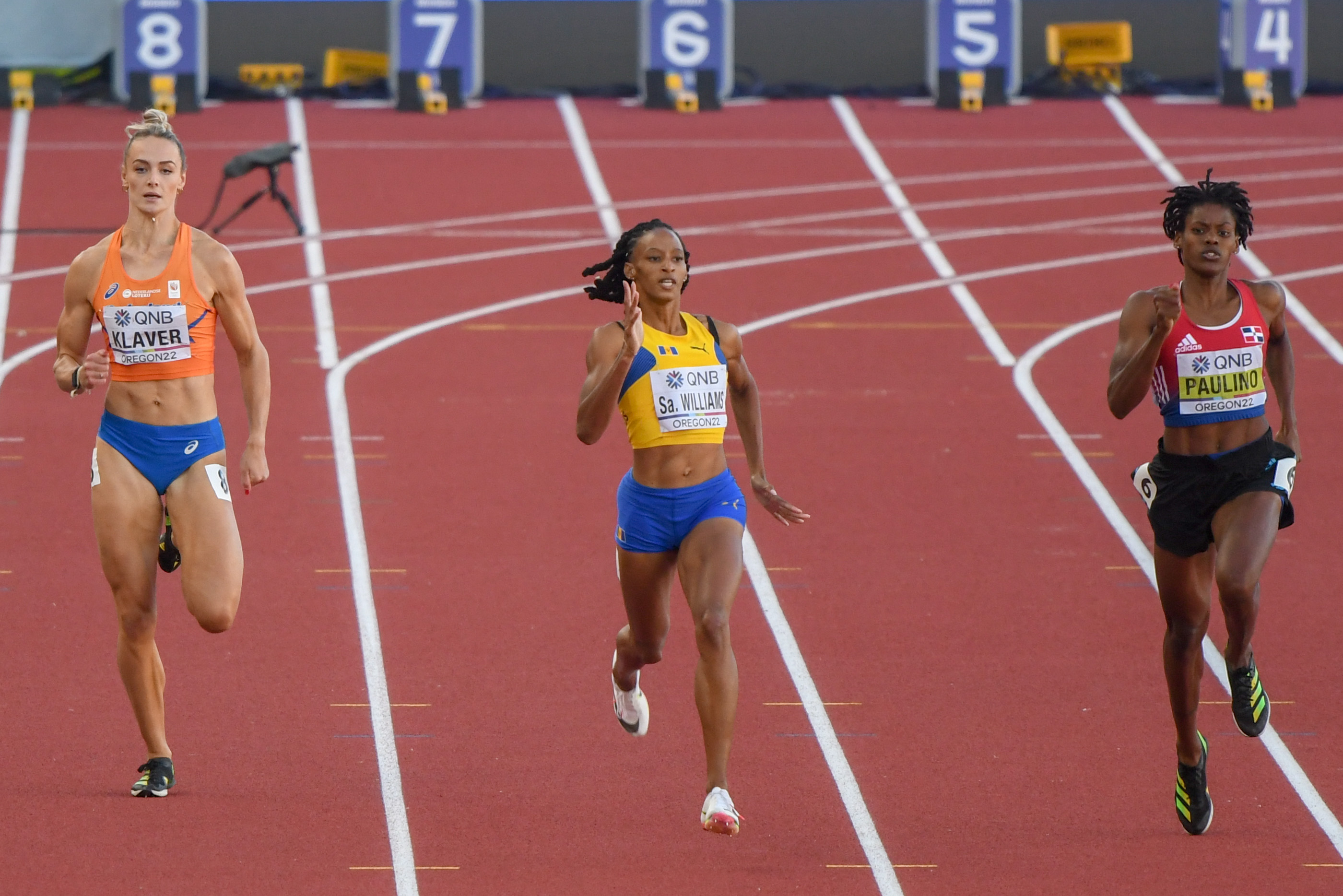
- Lieke Klaver, Sada Williams and Marileidy Paulino competing in the final.
- Venue: Hayward Field
- Dates: 17 July (heats); 20 July (semi-finals); 22 July (final)
- Competitors: 51 from 31 nations
- Winning time: 49.11

Medalists
gold medal	Shaunae Miller-Uibo	Bahamas
silver medal	Marileidy Paulino	Dominican Republic
bronze medal	Sada Williams	Barbados

Video on YouTube Official Video

The women's 400 metres at the 2022 World Athletics Championships was held at the Hayward Field in Eugene, Oregon, U.S. from 17 to 22 July 2022.

== Summary ==
In the absence of defending champion, #3 all time Salwa Eid Naser due to a succession of missed drug tests, #7 and double Olympic champion Shaunae Miller-Uibo and Marileidy Paulino were among the handful of athletes who had broken 50 seconds in 2022. Those two were the only ones to achieve the feat in the semis, though all auto qualifiers were under 50.2.

Adorned with green hair, Miller-Uibo quickly shortened the stagger between herself and Fiordaliza Cofil and then Candice McLeod to her outside. On the far outside, Lieke Klaver, Sada Williams and Paulino were doing the best to hold their position against Miller-Uibo. Williams accelerated slightly through the final turn, coming off in second place, slightly ahead of Paulino. The final 100m is Paulino's territory. Se separated from Williams but was unable to make up any ground on Miller-Uibo.

Miller-Uibo's 49.11 became the new world leader for the year. Williams became the first female medalist for Barbados, improving on her own National Record.

== Records ==
Before the competition records were as follows:

Record	Athlete & Nat.	Perf.	Location	Date
World record	Marita Koch (GDR)	47.60	Canberra, Australia	6 October 1985
Championship record	Jarmila Kratochvílová (TCH)	47.99	Helsinki, Finland	10 August 1983
World Leading	Marileidy Paulino (DOM)	49.49	La Nucia, Spain	21 May 2022
African Record	Falilat Ogunkoya (NGR)	49.10	Atlanta, United States	29 July 1996
Asian Record	Salwa Eid Naser (BHR)	48.14	Doha, Qatar	3 October 2019
North, Central American and Caribbean record	Shaunae Miller-Uibo (BAH)	48.36	Tokyo, Japan	6 August 2021
South American Record	Ximena Restrepo (COL)	49.64	Barcelona, Spain	5 August 1992
European Record	Marita Koch (GDR)	47.60	Canberra, Australia	6 October 1985
Oceanian record	Cathy Freeman (AUS)	48.63	Atlanta, United States	29 July 1996

== Qualification standard ==
The standard to qualify automatically for entry was 51.35.

== Schedule ==
The event schedule, in local time (UTC−7), was as follows:

Date	Time	Round
17 July	12:00	Heats
20 July	18:45	Semi-finals
22 July	19:15	Final

== Results ==
=== Heats ===
The first 3 athletes in each heat (Q) and the next 6 fastest (q) qualify for the heats.

Rank	Heat	Name	Nationality	Time	Notes
1	2	Stephenie Ann McPherson	Jamaica	50.15	Q, SB
2	2	Natalia Kaczmarek	Poland	50.21	Q
3	2	Lieke Klaver	Netherlands	50.24	Q, NR
4	6	Anna Kiełbasińska	Poland	50.63	Q
5	4	Marileidy Paulino	Dominican Republic	50.76	Q
6	6	Candice McLeod	Jamaica	50.78	Q
7	3	Sada Williams	Barbados	51.05	Q
8	6	Victoria Ohuruogu	Great Britain & N.I.	51.07	Q
9	1	Shaunae Miller-Uibo	Bahamas	51.10	Q
10	2	Nicole Yeargin	Great Britain & N.I.	51.17	q, SB
11	5	Fiordaliza Cofil	Dominican Republic	51.19	Q
12	3	Modesta Justė Morauskaitė	Lithuania	51.27	Q
13	3	Ama Pipi	Great Britain & N.I.	51.32	Q
14	5	Talitha Diggs	United States	51.54	Q
15	2	Cátia Azevedo	Portugal	51.55	q
16	6	Lada Vondrová	Czech Republic	51.55	q
17	4	Rhasidat Adeleke	Ireland	51.59	Q
18	4	Lynna Irby	United States	51.78	Q
19	3	Charokee Young	Jamaica	51.84	q
20	5	Roxana Gómez	Cuba	51.85	Q
21	1	Aliyah Abrams	Guyana	51.98	Q
22	1	Gabby Scott	Puerto Rico	52.05	Q
23	2	Tábata de Carvalho	Brazil	52.17	q
24	1	Susanne Walli	Austria	52.18	q
25	4	Gunta Vaičule	Latvia	52.21	
26	3	Sophie Becker	Ireland	52.24	
27	1	Paola Morán	Mexico	52.28	
28	6	Natassha McDonald	Canada	52.41	
29	4	Lauren Gale	Canada	52.46	
30	1	Kendall Ellis	United States	52.55	
31	3	Camille Laus	Belgium	52.56	
32	3	Eveline Saalberg	Netherlands	52.59	
33	4	Anita Horvat	Slovenia	52.67	
34	5	Alice Mangione	Italy	52.72	
35	6	Tiffani Marinho	Brazil	52.80	
36	4	Imaobong Nse Uko	Nigeria	52.80	
37	2	Niddy Mingilishi	Zambia	52.84	
38	5	Silke Lemmens	Switzerland	52.86	
39	5	Aiyanna Stiverne	Canada	53.07	
40	5	Naomi Van den Broeck	Belgium	53.16	
41	1	Miranda Charlene Coetzee	South Africa	53.30	
42	6	Shereen Vallabouy	Malaysia	53.57	
43	6	Rosie Elliott	New Zealand	54.92	

=== Semi-finals ===
The semifinals started on 20 July at 18:45.

Rank	Heat	Name	Nationality	Time	Notes
1	1	Shaunae Miller-Uibo	Bahamas	49.55	Q, SB
2	3	Marileidy Paulino	Dominican Republic	49.98	Q
3	1	Candice McLeod	Jamaica	50.05	Q, SB
4	3	Sada Williams	Barbados	50.12	Q, SB
5	2	Fiordaliza Cofil	Dominican Republic	50.14	Q, PB
6	2	Lieke Klaver	Netherlands	50.18	Q, NR
7	2	Stephenie Ann McPherson	Jamaica	50.56	q
8	1	Anna Kiełbasińska	Poland	50.65	q
9	1	Rhasidat Adeleke	Ireland	50.81	
10	3	Talitha Diggs	United States	50.84	
11	1	Victoria Ohuruogu	Great Britain & N.I.	50.99	PB
12	1	Lynna Irby	United States	51.00	
13	3	Roxana Gómez	Cuba	51.12	
14	2	Nicole Yeargin	Great Britain & N.I.	51.22	
15	2	Natalia Kaczmarek	Poland	51.34	
16	3	Charokee Young	Jamaica	51.41	
17	3	Lada Vondrová	Czech Republic	51.47	
18	2	Aliyah Abrams	Guyana	51.79	
19	1	Cátia Azevedo	Portugal	51.79	
20	2	Gabby Scott	Puerto Rico	51.97	
21	3	Modesta Justė Morauskaitė	Lithuania	52.19	
22	3	Ama Pipi	Great Britain & N.I.	52.28	
23	2	Susanne Walli	Austria	52.37	
24	1	Tábata de Carvalho	Brazil	52.42	

=== Final ===
Rank	Name	Nationality	Time	Notes
1st place, gold medalist(s)	Shaunae Miller-Uibo	Bahamas	49.11	WL
2nd place, silver medalist(s)	Marileidy Paulino	Dominican Republic	49.60	
3rd place, bronze medalist(s)	Sada Williams	Barbados	49.75	NR
4	Lieke Klaver	Netherlands	50.33	
5	Stephenie Ann McPherson	Jamaica	50.36	
6	Fiordaliza Cofil	Dominican Republic	50.57	
7	Candice McLeod	Jamaica	50.78	
8	Anna Kiełbasińska	Poland	50.81	
