= Alfred Adderley =

Bahamian lawyer and Member of Parliament

Alfred Francis Adderley (16 November 1891–16 June 1953) (often cited as A. F. Adderley) was a Bahamian lawyer, Member of Parliament and acting Chief Justice of the Supreme Court. His son was the Attorney-General, Paul Adderley.

== Early life and education ==
Adderley was born in Nassau, Bahamas on 16 November 1891. He was the son of parliamentarian Wilfred P. Adderley and his wife Letitia (née McMinn). He was his parents' only child but he had older half-siblings from his mother's first marriage. Adderley attended Boys’ Central School and Nassau Grammar School. He then went abroad to Denstone College in Staffordshire, England from 1908-1911.

He obtained a bachelors of arts and a bachelors of law from St Catharine’s College, Cambridge in 1926.

== Career ==
Adderley was called to the Bar at the Middle Temple on 14 May 1919. He returned to the Bahamas where he went on to become a renowned trial attorney, known for his work on cases such as the Forrester Scott-Stanley Boynton kidnapping case, an assault on Errol Flynn and the murder of Sir Harry Oakes.

He was elected to the House of Assembly in 1923. In 1938, he was appointed to the Legislative Council. In 1946, he became the first black person appointed to the Executive Council. He served as Acting Chief Justice of the Supreme Court in 1951, becoming in the process the country's first black chief justice.

He was the founder and first president of the Bahamas Amateur Athletic Association, the founder of the Bahamas Cricket Association and also Vice President of the Bahamas Olympic Association.

== Honours ==
In 1951, he was appointed a Commander of the Order of the British Empire in the King’s Birthday Honours.

== Death and legacy ==
Adderley represented the Bahamas at the coronation of Queen Elizabeth II. He died on 16 June 1953, on the voyage back to the Bahamas. He was 62.

Both the A. F. Adderley High School and the A.F. Adderley Auditorium in Nassau are named for him.
