= List of Bahamian records in athletics =

The following are the national records in athletics in Bahamas maintained by Bahamas' national athletics federation: Bahamas Association of Athletic Associations (BAAA).

== Outdoor ==
Key to tables: Awaiting ratification Record not kept by BAAA Not ratified or later rescinded by BAAA

=== Men ===
Event	Record	Athlete	Date	Meet	Place	Ref.
100 m	9.91 (−0.5 m/s)	Derrick Atkins	26 August 2007	World Championships	Osaka, Japan	
100 m	9.91 (+1.0 m/s)	Terrence Jones	15 April 2023	Tom Jones Memorial	Gainesville, United States	
150 m (straight)	14.93 (−1.1 m/s)	Terrence Jones	17 May 2025	Adidas Games	Atlanta, United States	
200 m	19.75 (+0.3 m/s)	Steven Gardiner	7 April 2018	Hurricane Alumni Invitational	Coral Gables, United States	
200 m (straight)	19.88 (+0.3 m/s)	Steven Gardiner	20 May 2018	Adidas Boost Boston Games	Boston, United States	
300 m	31.52	Steven Gardiner	12 May 2022	Puerto Rico International Athletics Classic	Ponce, Puerto Rico	
400 m	43.48	Steven Gardiner	4 October 2019	World Championships	Doha, Qatar	
800 m	1:49.54	Chris Brown	17 August 1998	Central American and Caribbean Games	Maracaibo, Venezuela	
1500 m	3:45.72	William Johnson	17 May 1983		Austin, United States	
3000 m	8:43.59	David Bell	23 April 1993		Philadelphia, United States	
5000 m	14:00.54 (Note: ratified by federation but not recognised by World Athletics)	O'Neil Williams	14 May 2011	Nassau Invitational	Nassau, The Bahamas	
5000 m	14:33.99	Gabriel Curtis	2 April 2021	Florida Relays	Gainesville, United States	
5 km (road)	16:48+	O'Neil Williams	20 October 2019	Amsterdam Marathon	Amsterdam, Netherlands	
10,000 m	30:32.11	Gabriel Curtis	17 April 2021	Virginia Challenge	Charlottesville, United States	
10 km (road)	33:34+	O'Neil Williams	20 October 2019	Amsterdam Marathon	Amsterdam, Netherlands	
15 km (road)	50:44+	O'Neil Williams	20 October 2019	Amsterdam Marathon	Amsterdam, Netherlands	
20 km (road)	1:08:20+	O'Neil Williams	20 October 2019	Amsterdam Marathon	Amsterdam, Netherlands	
Half marathon	1:10:30+	O'Neil Williams	9 June 2019	Kaunas Marathon	Kaunas, Lithuania	
25 km (road)	1:25:24+	O'Neil Williams	20 October 2019	Amsterdam Marathon	Amsterdam, Netherlands	
30 km (road)	1:42:52+	O'Neil Williams	20 October 2019	Amsterdam Marathon	Amsterdam, Netherlands	
Marathon	2:29:28	O'Neil Williams	20 October 2019	Amsterdam Marathon	Amsterdam, Netherlands	
Marathon	2:25:10	O'Neil Williams	10 April 2022	Eldoret City Marathon	Eldoret, Kenya	
110 m hurdles	13.35 (+1.7 m/s)	Jahmaal Wilson	15 May 2022	WT Last Chance	Canyon, United States	
400 m hurdles	48.17	Jeffery Gibson	25 August 2015	World Championships	Beijing, China	
3000 m steeplechase	9:38.3 h	O'Neil Williams	19 March 2016	2nd Ugandan Trials	Kampala, Uganda	
High jump	2.38 m	Troy Kemp	12 July 1995 (Note: by World Athletics source; 15 May 1983 by federation source, probably false)		Nice, France (Note: by World Athletics source; Los Angeles, United States by federation source, probably false)	
Pole vault	4.89 m (Note: not ratified by federation but recognised by World Athletics)	Brent Vanderpool	1987		Nassau, The Bahamas	
Pole vault	5.06 m	Brenden Vanderpool	9 April 2023	CARIFTA Games	Nassau, The Bahamas	
Pole vault	5.30 m	Brenden Vanderpool	30 March 2024	CARIFTA Games	St. George's, Grenada	
Long jump	8.41 m (+1.5 m/s)	Craig Hepburn	17 June 1993		Nassau, The Bahamas	
Triple jump	17.59 m (+0.9 m/s)	Leevan Sands	21 August 2008	Olympic Games	Beijing, China	
Shot put	18.37 m	Malik Stuart	29 May 2018	NAIA Outdoor Track and Field Championships	Gulf Shores, United States	
Discus throw	67.10 m	Bradley Cooper	14 June 1986		Nassau, The Bahamas	
Hammer throw	49.74 m	Delron Inniss	14 April 2017	Dickinson State University Blue Hawk Games	Dickinson, United States	
Javelin throw	79.89 m	Keyshawn Strachan	16 April 2022	CARIFTA Games	Kingston, Jamaica	
Javelin throw	84.27 m	Keyshawn Strachan	31 March 2023	Texas Relays	Austin, United States	
Decathlon	7788 pts	Kendrick Thompson	29–30 May 2022	JAC Combined Events Qualifier	Jacksonville, United States	
Decathlon	100m (wind) / Long jump (wind) / Shot put / High jump / 400m / 110m H (wind) / Discus / Pole vault / Javelin / 1500m; 10.80 (+1.5 m/s) / 7.47 m (±0.0 m/s) / 13.60 m / 1.99 m / 48.99 / 14.53 (±0.0 m/s) / 39.70 m / 4.15 m / 60.01 m / 4:47.71					
Decathlon	7866 pts	Ken Mullings	23–24 July 2022	World Championships	Eugene, United States	
Decathlon	100m (wind) / Long jump (wind) / Shot put / High jump / 400m / 110m H (wind) / Discus / Pole vault / Javelin / 1500m; 10.83 (+1.1 m/s) / 6.96 m (−0.9 m/s) / 13.83 m / 2.05 m / 49.25 / 14.02 (+0.4 m/s) / 42.70 m / 4.50 m / 56.92 m / 4:52.85					
Decathlon	8182 pts	Kendrick Thompson	27–28 May 2023	Hypo-Meeting	Götzis, Austria	
Decathlon	100m (wind) / Long jump (wind) / Shot put / High jump / 400m / 110m H (wind) / Discus / Pole vault / Javelin / 1500m; 10.28 (+1.5 m/s) / 7.48 m (+0.6 m/s) / 13.48 m / 2.00 m / 47.22 / 14.40 (+0.1 m/s) / 41.99 m / 4.50 m / 64.63 m / 4:56.44					
Decathlon	8226 pts	Ken Mullings	2–3 August 2024	Olympic Games	Paris, France	
Decathlon	100m (wind) / Long jump (wind) / Shot put / High jump / 400m / 110m H (wind) / Discus / Pole vault / Javelin / 1500m; 10.60 (+0.8 m/s) / 7.36 m (+0.8 m/s) / 14.19 m / 2.02 m / 49.43 / 13.70 (+0.7 m/s) / 46.07 m / 4.80 m / 59.83 m / 4:55.84					
20 km walk (road)						
50 km walk (road)						
4 × 100 m relay	38.52	Bahamas; Adrian Griffith; Warren Fraser; Shavez Hart; Teray Smith	1 August 2014	Commonwealth Games	Glasgow, Great Britain	
4 × 200 m relay	1:22.18	Bahamas; Blake Bartlett; Adrian Griffith; Wesley Neymour; Andretti Bain	24 May 2014	IAAF World Relays	Nassau, Bahamas	
4 × 400 m relay	2:56.72	Bahamas; Chris Brown; Demetrius Pinder; Michael Mathieu; Ramon Miller	10 August 2012	Olympic Games	London, Great Britain	

=== Women ===
Event	Record	Athlete	Date	Meet	Place	Ref.
100 y	10.21+ (+1.5 m/s)	Chandra Sturrup	27 May 2010	Golden Spike Ostrava	Ostrava, Czech Republic	
100 y	10.21+ (+1.1 m/s)	Debbie Ferguson	31 May 2011	Golden Spike Ostrava	Ostrava, Czech Republic	
100 m	10.84 (+1.9 m/s)	Chandra Sturrup	5 July 2005	Athletissima	Lausanne, Switzerland	
150 m (straight)	16.23 (−0.7 m/s)	Shaunae Miller-Uibo	20 May 2018	Adidas Boost Boston Games	Boston, United States	
200 m	21.74 (−0.4 m/s)	Shaunae Miller-Uibo	29 August 2019	Diamond League	Zürich, Switzerland	
200 m (straight)	21.76 (+0.5 m/s)	Shaunae Miller-Uibo	4 June 2017	Boost Boston Games	Somerville, United States	
300 m	34.41	Shaunae Miller-Uibo	20 June 2019	Golden Spike Ostrava	Ostrava, Czech Republic	
400 m	48.36	Shaunae Miller-Uibo	6 August 2021	Olympic Games	Tokyo, Japan	
800 m	2:04.82	Vernetta Rolle	23 May 1998		Atlanta, United States	
1500 m	4:36.37	Jennaya Hield	6 May 2017	MEAC Championships	Greensboro, United States	
3000 m	10:26.39	Hughnique Rolle	7 April 2012		Williamsburg, USA	
5000 m	18:05.25	Hughnique Rolle	27 April 2012	Lehigh Games	Bethlehem, United States	
10,000 m	45:50.79	Jennaya Hield	29 March 2015	Towson University Invitational	Towson, United States	
10,000 m	43:40.35	Delicia Boothe	5 May 2023	NJCAA Region VI Championships	Coffeyville, United States	
Marathon	2:54:37	Giselle Pyfrom	16 December 1995		Jacksonville, United States	
100 m hurdles	12.33 (+1.0 m/s)	Devynne Charlton	5 September 2026	Memorial Van Damme	Brussels, Belgium	
400 m hurdles	55.69	Katrina Seymour	10 April 2018	Commonwealth Games	Gold Coast, Australia	
3000 m steeplechase	11:59.00	Jessica Ferguson	12 April 2003		Indianola, United States	
High jump	1.81 m	Kenya Nafeia Culmer	12 May 2012	State Farm MVC Championships	Wichita, United States	
Pole vault						
Long jump	6.83 m (+0.3 m/s)	Bianca Stuart	26 June 2015	Bahamian Championships	Nassau, Bahamas	
Long jump	6.83 m (+0.7 m/s)	Anthaya Charlton	17 April 2026	Tom Jones Memorial	Gainesville, United States	
Triple jump	14.03 m (+1.0 m/s) (Note: Outdoor best; indoor mark ratified as absolute record.)	Tamara Myers	29 April 2017	Penn Relays	Philadelphia, United States	
Shot put	17.23 m	Aymara Albury	26 May 2006		Knoxville, United States	
Discus throw	60.92 m	Serena Brown	28 June 2021		Nassau, Bahamas	
Hammer throw	60.90 m	Tahj’nee Thurston	31 March 2022		Fresno, United States	
Javelin throw	63.73 m	Laverne Eve	22 April 2000		Nashville, United States	
Javelin throw	64.19 m	Rhema Otabor	6 June 2024	NCAA Division I Championships	Eugene, United States	
Weight throw	17.07 m	Aymara Albury	2 February 2007	7th Annual New Balance Collegiate Invitational	New York City, United States	
Heptathlon	5368 pts	Carmel Major	5–6 June 1987		Baton Rouge, United States	
Heptathlon	100m H (wind) / High jump / Shot put / 200m (wind) / Long jump (wind) / Javelin / 800m; 14.10w / 1.53 m / 10.94 m / 25.09 / 5.35 m / 45.52 m / 2:18.21					
20 km walk (road)						
35 km walk (road)						
50 km walk (road)						
4 × 100 m relay	41.92 (Note: by World Athletics source; 41.91 by federation source, a typo)	Bahamas; Savatheda Fynes; Chandra Sturrup; Pauline Davis-Thompson; Debbie Ferguson	29 August 1999	World Championships	Seville, Spain	
4 × 200 m relay	1:31.31	Bahamas; Sheniqua Ferguson; Anthonique Strachan; Nivea Smith; Cache Armbrister	25 May 2014	IAAF World Relays	Nassau, Bahamas	
Sprint medley relay (1,1,2,4)	1:39.03	Bahamas; Shequnia Ferguson (100 m); Tamara Myers (100 m); Tynia Gaither (200 m); Katrina Seymour (400 m)	28 April 2018	Penn Relays	Philadelphia, United States	
4 × 400 m relay	3:26.36	Bahamas; Lanece Clarke; Anthonique Strachan; Carmiesha Cox; Christine Amertil	19 August 2016	Olympic Games	Rio de Janeiro, Brazil	

=== Mixed ===
Event	Record	Athlete	Date	Meet	Place	Ref.
4 × 400 m relay	3:12.81	Bahamas; Alonzo Russell; Shania Adderley; Steven Gardiner; Shaunae Miller-Uibo	5 May 2024	World Relays	Nassau, Bahamas	

== Indoor ==
=== Men ===
Event	Record	Athlete	Date	Meet	Place	Ref.
50 m	5.80	Fabian Whymns	16 January 1983		Sherbrooke, Canada	
60 m	6.45	Terrence Jones	15 January 2022	Corky Classic	Lubbock, United States	
200 m	20.21	Terrence Jones	24 February 2024	Big 12 Championships	Lubbock, United States	
200 m	20.17	Wanya McCoy	14 March 2026	NCAA Division I Championships	Fayetteville, United States	
300 m	31.56	Steven Gardiner	28 January 2022	South Carolina Invitational	Columbia, United States	
400 m	45.33	Demetrius Pinder	12 March 2011	NCAA Division I Championships	College Station, United States	
500 m	1:02.01	Troy McIntosh	18 February 2001	Cedar Falls Superstars Invitational	Cedar Falls, United States	
600 m	1:18.29	Andre Colebrook	13 January 2017	McNeese Invite 1	Lake Charles, United States	
800 m	1:51.35	Andre Colebrook	8 March 2014		New York City, United States	
800 m	1:50.64	Lester Taylor	31 January 2015	BU John Thomas Terrier Classic	Boston, United States	
800 m	1:49.65	Lester Taylor	14 February 2015	BU David Hemery Valentine Invitational	Boston, United States	
1000 m	2:27.14	Lester Taylor	23 January 2015		New York City, United States	
1500 m	4:24.15y	Andre Colebrook	10 January 2014	NYC Gotham Cup	New York City, United States	
Mile	4:24.15	Andre Colebrook	10 January 2014	NYC Gotham Cup	New York City, United States	
3000 m	8:23.28 (Note: outdoor mark ratified as absolute record)	Gabriel Curtis	15 February 2020		Boston, United States	
50 m hurdles	6.40+	Shamar Sands	10 February 2009	Meeting Pas de Calais	Liévin, France	
55 m hurdles	7.05	Shamar Sands	24 January 2009		Gainesville, United States	
60 m hurdles	7.49	Shamar Sands	10 February 2009	Meeting Pas de Calais	Liévin, France	
High jump	2.36 m	Troy Kemp	18 March 1994	High Jump Gala	Weinheim, Germany	
Pole vault	4.95 m	Brent Vanderpool	15 February 1988	Naval Academy - Halsey Field House	Annapolis, Maryland	
Long jump	8.16 m	LaQuan Nairn	7 February 2021	American Track League #3	Fayetteville, United States	
Long jump	8.18 m	LaQuan Nairn	18 February 2022	Arkansas Qualifier	Fayetteville, United States	
Triple jump	17.09 m	Frank Rutherford	14 March 1987		Oklahoma City, United States	
Triple jump	17.10 m X	Leevan Sands	11 February 2006	Tyson Invitational	Fayetteville, United States	
Shot put	16.55 m	Perry Adderley	23 February 2019		Nampa, United States	
Shot put	17.31 m	Malik Stuart	18 February 2017	WHAC Championships	Grand Rapids, United States	
Weight throw	17.57 m	Perry Adderley	8 December 2018	K-State Winter Invitational	Manhattan, United States	
Heptathlon	6340 pts	Ken Mullings	26–27 January 2024	Illini Challenge	Champaign, United States	
Heptathlon	60m / Long jump / Shot put / High jump / 60m H / Pole vault / 1000m; 6.83 / 7.52 m / 15.91 m / 2.14 m / 7.76 / 4.95 m / 2:52.68					
5000 m walk						
4 × 400 m relay	3:04.75	Bahamas; Michael Mathieu; Alonzo Russel; Shavez Hart; Chris Brown	20 March 2016	World Championships	Portland, United States	

=== Women ===
Event	Record	Athlete	Date	Meet	Place	Ref.
50 m	6.05+	Savatheda Fynes	13 February 2000	Meeting Pas de Calais	Liévin, France	
55 m	6.65	Savatheda Fynes	8 March 1997		Indianapolis, United States	
60 m	7.01	Savatheda Fynes	7 March 1999	World Championships	Maebashi, Japan	
60 m	7.01	Savatheda Fynes	16 February 2000		Madrid, Spain	
200 m	22.40	Shaunae Miller-Uibo	31 January 2021	American Track League #2	Fayetteville, United States	
300 m	35.45	Shaunae Miller-Uibo	3 February 2018	Millrose Games	New York City, United States	
400 m	50.21	Shaunae Miller-Uibo	13 February 2021	New Balance Indoor Grand Prix	Staten Island, United States	
800 m	2:09.34	Vernetta Rolle	24 January 1998		Baton Rouge, United States	
800 m	2:06.42 OT	Teshon Adderly	22 February 2013	Big Ten Indoor Championships	Geneva, United States	
1000 m	2:55.01	Hughnique Rolle	20 February 2010	Big East Championships	New York City, United States	
1500 m	5:10.92y	Jennaya Hield	14 February 2014	Lafayette/Rider Winter Games	New York City, United States	
Mile	5:10.92	Jennaya Hield	14 February 2014	Lafayette/Rider Winter Games	New York City, United States	
3000 m	10:25.22 (Note: outdoor mark ratified as absolute record)	Jennaya Hield	18 February 2017	MEAC Championships	Landover, United States	
5000 m	19:15.82	Jennaya Hield	10 January 2014	NYC Gotham Cup	New York City, United States	
50 m hurdles	6.86+	Devynne Charlton	13 February 2025	Meeting Hauts-de-France Pas-de-Calais	Liévin, France	
55 m hurdles	7.28+	Devynne Charlton	8 February 2025	Millrose Games	New York City, United States	
60 m hurdles	7.65	Devynne Charlton	3 March 2024	World Championships	Glasgow, United Kingdom	
60 m hurdles	7.65	Devynne Charlton	22 March 2026	World Championships	Toruń, Poland	
High jump	1.83 m (Note: outdoor mark ratified as absolute record)	Kenya Culmer	2 March 2014		Cedar Falls, United States	
High jump	1.87 m	Saniel Atkinson-Grier	24 January 2014	Vanderbilt Invitational	Nashville, United States	
High jump	1.87 m	Saniel Atkinson-Grier	8 February 2014	Doc Hale Virginia Tech Elite	Blacksburg, United States	
Pole vault						
Long jump	6.98 m	Anthaya Charlton	31 January 2026	Razorback Invitational	Fayetteville, United States	
Triple jump	14.88 m A	Charisma Taylor	11 March 2023	NCAA Division I Championships	Albuquerque, United States	
Shot put	16.68 m	Aymara Albury	25 February 2006		Gainesville, United States	
Weight throw	19.02 m A	Acacia Astwood	28 February 2020	Mountain West Championships	Albuquerque, United States	
Pentathlon	3586 pts	Devinn Cartwright	22 January 2015		Birmingham, United States	
Pentathlon	60m H / High jump / Shot put / Long jump / 800m; 8.21 / 1.82m / 12.78m / 6.38m / 2:34.75					
3000 m walk						
4 × 400 m relay	4:00.42	University of Bahamas; Shannon; Romica; Miller; Ford	2 February 2019		West Lafayette, United States	

== Junior ==
=== Men ===
Event	Record	Athlete	Date	Meet	Location	Age	Ref.
100 m	10.30 (+0.1 m/s)	Adam Musgrove	5 July 2023	Bahamian Championships	Nassau, Bahamas	19 years, 169 days	
200 m	20.36 (+0.9 m/s)	Terrence Jones	29 May 2021	NCAA Division I West Preliminary Round	College Station, United States	18 years, 202 days	
400 m	45.81	Wendell Miller	26 June 2021	Bahamas Nationals	Nassau, Bahamas	18 years, 174 days	
800 m	1:50.81	Andre Colebrook	22 March 2013		High Point, United States	19 years, 14 days	
1500 m	3:53.10	David Bell	8 July 1994		Port of Spain, Trinidad and Tobago		
5000 m	15:27.34	Benjamin Najman	16 May 2015		Hutchinson, United States		
110 m hurdles (99.0 cm)	13.36 (+1.6 m/s)	Antoine Andrews	1 August 2022	World U20 Championships	Cali, Colombia	19 years, 111 days	
400 m hurdles	51.06	Jahcario Wilson	5 April 2026	CARIFTA Games	St. George's, Grenada	16 years, 95 days	
3000 m steeplechase	9:47.68	David Ferguson	1997		Nassau, Bahamas		
High jump	2.28 m	Ryan Ingraham	12 May 2012		Nassau, Bahamas	18 years, 192 days	
Long jump	8.04 m	Joey Wells	26 July 1983	CAC Championships	La Habana, Cuba		
Triple jump	16.58 m	Allen Mortimer	17 May 1996		Odessa, United States		
Pole vault	4.26 m	Brent Johnson	19 April 1987		Port of Spain, Trinidad and Tobago		
Shot put	16.10 m	Tarajh Hudson	20 March 2021	Red-Line Track Classic	Nassau, Bahamas		
Discus throw (1.75 kg)	54.78 m	Drexel Maycock	12 June 2015	Bahamas Junior Nationals	Nassau, Bahamas		
Javelin throw	79.89 m	Keyshawn Strachan	16 April 2022	CARIFTA Games	Kingston, Jamaica		
Hammer throw							
Decathlon							
4 × 100 m relay	39.49	Ure Mills; Rico Moultrie; Adrain Curry Jr. Joel Johnson	22 April 2019	CARIFTA Games	George Town, Cayman Islands	18 years, 226 days	
4 × 400 m relay	3:06.18	Zion Davis; Aiden Kelly; Emmanuel Adams; Zion Miller	21 April 2025	CARIFTA Games	Port of Spain, Trinidad and Tobago		

=== Women ===
Event	Record	Athlete	Date	Meet	Location	Age	Ref.
100 m	11.19 (+1.2 m/s)	Debbie Ferguson-McKenzie	3 June 1995	NCAA Division I Championships	Knoxville, United States	19 years, 138 days	
200 m	22.45 (+0.9 m/s)	Shaunae Miller	22 June 2013	Bahamian Championships	Freeport, Bahamas	19 years, 68 days	
400 m	50.70	Shaunae Miller	7 June 2013	NCAA Division I Championships	Eugene, United States	19 years, 53 days	
800 m	2:06.27	Vernita Rolle	18 March 1995		Baton Rouge, United States		
1500 m	4:43.97	Hughnique Rolle	22 April 2011	CARIFTA Games	Montego Bay, Jamaica		
3000 m	10:27.3 h	Hughnique Rolle	24 April 2011	CARIFTA Games	Montego Bay, Jamaica		
10,000 m							
100 m hurdles	13.44 (+1.0 m/s)	Sasha Wells	2 April 2018	CARIFTA Games	Nassau, Bahamas		
400 m hurdles	57.24	Katrina Seymour	16 July 2011	Central American and Caribbean Games	Mayagüez, Puerto Rico	18 years, 190 days	
3000 m steeplechase							
High jump	1.78 m	Sharon Rose	10 July 1981	Central American and Caribbean Games	Santo Domingo, Dominican Republic		
Long jump	6.41 m NWI	Daphne Saunders	29 July 1989	Central American and Caribbean Games	San Juan, Puerto Rico		
Triple jump	13.05 m (+1.6 m/s)	Danielle Gibson	3 April 2015	CARIFTA Games	Basseterre, Saint Kitts and Nevis	18 years, 363 days	
Pole vault							
Shot put	17.09 m	Aymara Albury	16 May 2004		Oxford, United States		
Discus throw	52.73 m	Serena Brown	21 July 2016	World U20 Championships	Bydgoszcz, Poland		
Hammer throw	52.61 m	Aymara Albury	17 April 2004		Baton Rouge, United States		
Javelin throw	55.08 m A	Rhema Otabor	19 August 2021	World U20 Championships	Nairobi, Kenya	18 years, 259 days	
Heptathlon	4489 pts	Melinda Bastian	25 April 2003		Overland Park, United States		
20 km walk (road)							
4 × 100 m relay	44.32	V'Alonee Robinson; Sheniqua Ferguson; Tia Rolle; Nivea Smith	11 July 2008	World U20 Championships	Bydgoszcz, Poland	16 years, 66 days 18 years, 230 days 18 years, 144 days	
4 × 400 m relay	3:33.43	Rashan Brown; Amara Jones; Katrina Seymour; Shaunae Miller	25 July 2010	World U20 Championships	Moncton, Canada	18 years, 310 days 17 years, 199 days 16 years, 101 days	
