= Bahamas at the World Athletics Championships =

- Flag of the Bahamas
- WA code: BAH
- Website: www.baaabahamas.com
- Medals Ranked 23rd: Gold 9 Silver 9 Bronze 8 Total 26

World Athletics Championships appearances (overview)
- 1983; 1987; 1991; 1993; 1995; 1997; 1999; 2001; 2003; 2005; 2007; 2009; 2011; 2013; 2015; 2017; 2019; 2022; 2023; 2025

The Bahamas has participated in every World Athletics Championships since its inception.

== Medals by World Championships ==
World Championship	Gold	Silver	Bronze	Total
2001 Edmonton	3	0	1	4
2007 Osaka	1	2	0	3
1995 Gothenburg	1	1	0	2
2005 Helsinki	1	1	0	2
2019 Doha	1	1	0	2
1999 Seville	1	0	0	1
2022 Eugene	1	0	0	1
2003 Paris	0	1	2	3
2009 Berlin	0	1	1	2
2015 Beijing	0	1	1	2
2017 London	0	1	1	2
1997 Athens	0	0	1	1
2011 Daegu	0	0	1	1
1983 Helsinki	0	0	0	0
1987 Rome	0	0	0	0
1991 Tokyo	0	0	0	0
1993 Stuttgart	0	0	0	0
2013 Moscow	0	0	0	0
2023 Budapest	0	0	0	0
2025 Tokyo	0	0	0	0
Totals (20 entries)	9	9	8	26
