= Andre Colebrook =

Bahamian sprinter (born 1994)

Personal information
- Born: March 8, 1994 (age 32)
Medal record
Men's Athletics
Representing Bahamas
Pan American Junior Championships
Silver medal – second place	2013 Medellín	800 m
CARIFTA Games Junior (U20)
Silver medal – second place	2013 Nassau	800 m
Bronze medal – third place	2013 Nassau	4×400 m relay
Bronze medal – third place	2012 Hamilton	800 m

Andre Colebrook (born March 8, 1994) is a male sprinter from Eleuthera in The Bahamas, who mainly competes in the 400m Hurdles 400m and 800. He attended Central Eleuthera High School in Eleuthera, before going on to compete for Essex County College and Southeastern Louisiana University.

Colebrook competed at the 2019 Pan American Games and the 2017 IAAF World Relays.

== Personal bests ==
Event	Time (seconds)	Venue	Date
400m Hurdles	49.81	Hammond, Louisiana	02 MAR 2019
400m	46.60	Lafayette, Louisiana	18 MAR 2017
800m	1:50.81	High Point, North Carolina	23 MAR 2013
