= Keyshawn Strachan =

Bahamian javelin thrower (born 2003)

Personal information
- Born: 18 December 2003 (age 22) The Bahamas
- Height: 1.95 m (6 ft 5 in)

Sport
- Country: Bahamas
- Sport: Track and field
- Event: Javelin throw

Achievements and titles
- Personal bests: NR 84.27 m (2023)
Medal record
| Gold medal – first place | Texas Relay 2023 Record breaker and P.B. | Javelin throw |
NACAC U-23 Championships
| Silver medal – second place | 2021 San Jose | Javelin throw |
CARIFTA Games Junior (U20)
| Gold medal – first place | 2022 Kingston | Javelin throw |
CARIFTA Games Youth (U18)
| Gold medal – first place | 2019 George Town | Javelin throw |

Keyshawn Strachan, (born 18 December 2003) is a Bahamian track and field athlete who competes in the javelin throw.

He was born and raised in Andros, Bahamas with a super village to support him. He started sports in primary school competing in 200m, 100m and also a softball throw.

Strachan competed for the Auburn Tigers track and field and Nebraska Cornhuskers track and field teams in the NCAA.

Strachan holds the Bahamian javelin throw national record set in Kingston, Jamaica at the 2022 CARIFTA Games with a throw of 79.89 m.

Strachan also holds the CARIFTA Games Record in the under 18 and under 20 category. He also competed at the 2021 World Athletics U20 Championships in Nairobi, Kenya.

== See also ==
- List of javelin throwers
