= Bahamas Association of Athletic Associations =

Governing body for athletics in the Bahamas

- Sport: Athletics
- Jurisdiction: Association
- Abbreviation: BAAA
- Founded: 1952
- Affiliation: World Athletics
- Affiliation date: 1952
- Regional affiliation: NACAC
- Headquarters: Nassau
- President: Drumeco Archer
- Vice president: Rayvanno Ferguson
- Secretary: Mabelene Miller
- Replaced: Bahamas Amateur Athletic Association

Official website
- www.bahamasathletics.com
- (The Bahamas)

The Bahamas Association of Athletic Associations (BAAA) is the governing body for the sport of athletics in the Bahamas. Current president is Rosamunde Carey. She was elected on 28 November 2015 for the period 2015-2018. She becomes the first woman elected to the position

== History ==
Prior to 1952, there was already a Bahamas Athletic Association. BAAA was founded on 6 May 1952 as Bahamas Amateur Athletic Association and was affiliated to the IAAF the same year. First president was Alfred Frances Adderley. Early in the new millennium the federation’s name was changed to The Bahamas Association of Athletic Associations. A detailed report on the history of BAAA was given on Facebook.

== Affiliations ==
BAAA is the national member federation for the Bahamas in the following international organisations:

- World Athletics
- North American, Central American and Caribbean Athletic Association (NACAC)
- Association of Panamerican Athletics (APA)
- Central American and Caribbean Athletic Confederation (CACAC)

Moreover, it is part of the following national organisations:

- Bahamas Olympic Committee (BOC)

== National records ==
BAAA maintains the Bahamian records in athletics.
