= Adrian Griffith (athlete) =

Bahamian sprinter (born 1984)

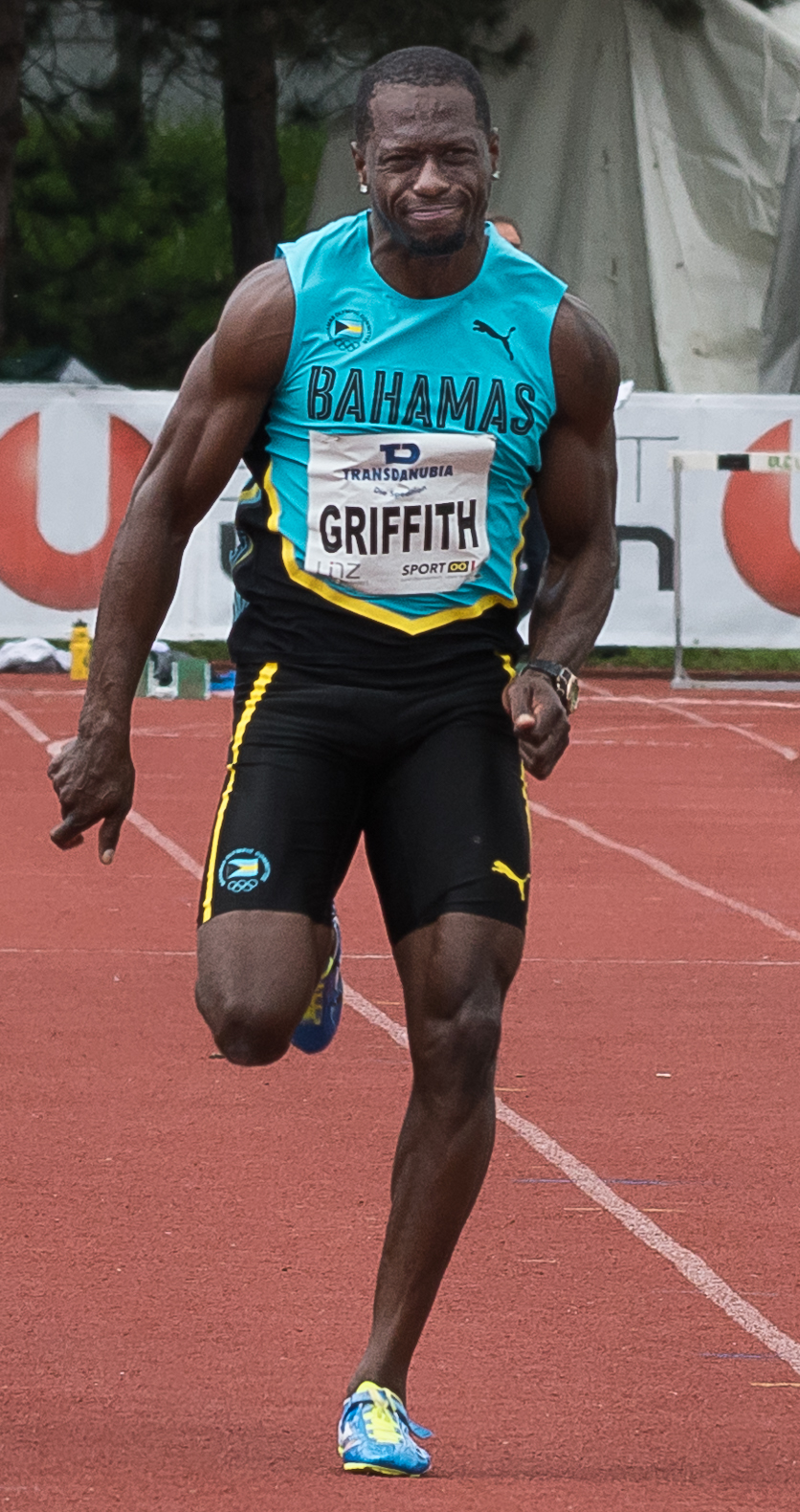

Personal information
- Born: 11 November 1984 (age 41) New Providence, Bahamas
- Height: 1.78 m (5 ft 10 in)
- Weight: 75 kg (165 lb)

Sport
- Country: Bahamas
- Sport: Athletics
- Event: Sprint
- College team: Dickinson State
Medal record
Athletics
Representing Bahamas
Central American and Caribbean Games
| Silver medal – second place | 2006 Cartagena | 4×100 m relay |
CAC Championships
| Gold medal – first place | 2013 Morelia | 4×100 m relay |
| Silver medal – second place | 2008 Cali | 4x100 m relay |
| Bronze medal – third place | 2009 Havana | 4x100 m relay |
CAC Junior Championships (U20)
| Bronze medal – third place | 2002 Bridgetown | Decathlon |
CARIFTA Games Junior (U20)
| Silver medal – second place | 2002 Nassau | Pole vault |
| Bronze medal – third place | 2002 Nassau | Heptathlon |
- Updated on 10 December 2014

Adrian Griffith (born 11 November 1984) is a Bahamian sprinter who specializes in the 100 metres.

He competed at the 2009 World Championships without reaching the final. In the 4×100 metres relay he won silver medals at the 2006 Central American and Caribbean Games and the 2008 Central American and Caribbean Championships.

His personal best time is 10.14 seconds, achieved in Clermont Florida April 2014. This makes him the second fastest Bahamian of all time behind Derrick Atkins, and fastest Bahamian-born sprinter, at the time. That mark has since been broken by Shavez Hart

He teamed up with Jamial Rolle, Shavez Hart and Trevorvano Mackey to break the Bahamian 4x100 national record in Morelia, Mexico.

== University ==
Griffith graduated with his Bachelor of Science degree in Computer Science as a magna cum laude honoree at Dickinson State University in Dickinson, North Dakota. He was a part of two-time National Association of Intercollegiate Athletics (NAIA) National Championship team while attending Dickinson State University. He also was a six-time Conference Championship team (Indoor and Outdoor Conference meet), eight-time NAIA All-American, 9-time All DAC-10 Conference, four-time DAC-10 Conference Champion and was named 2006 Most Outstanding Athlete in DAC 10 Conference meet. He was also the former school record holder in both the 100 meters and long jump.

== Personal bests ==
=== Outdoor ===
- 100 m: 10.11 s (wind: m/s) – Montverde, United States, 11 June 2016
- 200 m: 20.54 s (wind: +1.1 m/s) – Clermont, United States, 10 May 2014
- Long jump: 7.59 m (wind: +1.7 m/s) – Nassau, Bahamas, 17 June 2006

=== Indoor ===
- 60 m: 6.63 s – Newport News, United States, 8 February 2014
- Long jump: 7.63 m – Johnson City, United States, 10 March 2006

== International competitions ==
| Year | Competition | Venue | Position | Event | Notes |
Representing the Bahamas
| 2002 | CARIFTA Games | Nassau, Bahamas | 8th | 400m H | 57.67 |
| 2002 | CARIFTA Games | Nassau, Bahamas | 2nd | Pole vault | 3.00m |
| 2002 | CARIFTA Games | Nassau, Bahamas | 3rd | Heptathlon | 4594pts |
| 2002 | Central American and Caribbean Junior Championships (U-20) | Bridgetown, Barbados | 7th (h) | 400m H | 56.71 |
| 2002 | Central American and Caribbean Junior Championships (U-20) | Bridgetown, Barbados | 3rd | Decathlon | 6123 pts |
| 2004 | NACAC Under-23 Championships | Sherbrooke, Canada | 3rd | Long jump | 7.20m (+0.3 m/s) |
| 2005 | Central American and Caribbean Championships | Nassau, Bahamas | – | Decathlon | DNF |
| 2006 | NACAC U-23 Championships | Santo Domingo, Dominican Republic | 11th (sf) | 100m | 10.63 (+0.0 m/s) |
| 2006 | NACAC U-23 Championships | Santo Domingo, Dominican Republic | 7th | Long jump | 7.49 m (+0.7 m/s) |
| 2006 | NACAC U-23 Championships | Santo Domingo, Dominican Republic | 2nd | 4 × 100 m | 39.74 |
| 2006 | Central American and Caribbean Games | Cartagena, Colombia | 2nd | 4 × 100 m | 39.44 |
| 2007 | Pan American Games | Rio de Janeiro, Brazil | 17th (h) | 100m | 10.56 (+1.6 m/s) |
| 2007 | Pan American Games | Rio de Janeiro, Brazil | 7th | 4 × 100 m | 39.91 |
| 2008 | Central American and Caribbean Championships | Cali, Colombia | 8th | 100m | 10.51 (+0.6 m/s) |
| 2008 | Central American and Caribbean Championships | Cali, Colombia | 2nd | 4 × 100 m | 39.22 |
| 2009 | Central American and Caribbean Championships | Havana, Cuba | 5th | 100 m | 10.29 |
| 2009 | Central American and Caribbean Championships | Havana, Cuba | 3rd | 4 × 100 m | 39.45 |
| 2009 | World Championships | Berlin, Germany | 28th (qf) | 100m | 10.28 (+0.1 m/s) |
| 2010 | Central American and Caribbean Games | Mayagüez, Puerto Rico | 5th | 100m | 10.30 (+0.7 m/s) |
| 2010 | Central American and Caribbean Games | Mayagüez, Puerto Rico | – | 4 × 100 m | DQ |
| 2010 | Commonwealth Games | Delhi, India | 6th (sf) | 100m | 10.35 (+0.9 m/s) |
| 2010 | Commonwealth Games | Delhi, India | 5th | 4 × 100 m | 39.27 |
| 2011 | Central American and Caribbean Championships | Mayagüez, Puerto Rico | 7th | 100 m | 10.35 |
| 2011 | Central American and Caribbean Championships | Mayagüez, Puerto Rico | 4th | 4 × 100 m | 39.46 |
| 2011 | World Championships | Daegu, South Korea | – | 100 m | DQ |
| 2011 | Pan American Games | Guadalajara, Mexico | 14th (sf) | 100 m | 10.59 |
| 2013 | Central American and Caribbean Championships | Morelia, Mexico | 1st | 4 × 100 m | 38.77 |
| 2013 | World Championships | Moscow, Russia | 14th (h) | 4 × 100 m | 38.70 |
| 2014 | World Indoor Championships | Sopot, Poland | 22nd (h) | 60 m | 6.69 |
| 2014 | IAAF World Relays | Nassau, Bahamas | 6th | 4 × 200 m | 1:23.19 |
| 2014 | Commonwealth Games | Glasgow, United Kingdom | 25th (h) | 100 m | 10.46 |
| 2014 | Commonwealth Games | Glasgow, United Kingdom | 5th | 4 × 100 m | 39.16 |
| 2014 | Central American and Caribbean Games | Xalapa, Mexico | 8th | 100m | 10.48 A (+0.9 m/s) |
| 2014 | Central American and Caribbean Games | Xalapa, Mexico | 6th (sf) | 200m | 21.38 A (-0.4 m/s) |
| 2016 | World Indoor Championships | Portland, United States | 22nd (sf) | 60 m | 6.71 |
| 2016 | Olympic Games | Rio de Janeiro, Brazil | 61st (h) | 100 m | 10.53 |
| 2017 | IAAF World Relays | Nassau, Bahamas | 3rd (B) | 4 × 100 m | 39.18 |
| 2017 | IAAF World Relays | Nassau, Bahamas | 5th | 4 × 200 m | 1:22.36 |
