= LaQuan Nairn =

Bahamian long jumper and triple jumper

Medal record

Men's Athletics

Representing Bahamas

Commonwealth Games
| Gold medal – first place | 2022 Birmingham | Long jump |

Pan American U20 Championships
| Silver medal – second place | 2015 Edmonton | Long jump |

CAC Junior Championships (Junior)
| Gold medal – first place | 2014 Morelia | Long jump |

CAC Junior Championships (Youth)
| Silver medal – second place | 2012 San Salvador | Long jump |

CARIFTA Games (Junior)
| Gold medal – first place | 2013 Nassau | Long jump |
| Silver medal – second place | 2013 Nassau | High jump |

CARIFTA Games (Under 17)
| Bronze medal – third place | 2012 Hamilton | Long jump |
| Bronze medal – third place | 2012 Hamilton | High jump |

LaQuan Nairn (born 31 July 1996) is a male long jumper from Nassau, Bahamas. He attended C.R Walker High school in Nassau, Bahamas before going on to compete for South Plains College, and University of Arkansas. Nairn broke the Long jump indoor national record at the 2022 Tyson Invitational, with a jump of 8.18 meters.

Nairn is the younger brother of Lourawls Nairn Jr. who played basketball for the Michigan State Spartans.

== Personal bests ==
| Event | Time | Venue | Date |
|---|---|---|---|
| Long jump | 8.22 m (+2.0) | Walnut, California | 16 APR 2022 |
| Triple jump | 16.05 m (+1.3) | College Station, Texas | 28 MAY 2021 |
| Long jump (indoor) | 8.18 m | Fayetteville, Arkansas | 18 FEB 2022 |
