= Steven Gardiner =

Bahamian sprinter (born 1995)

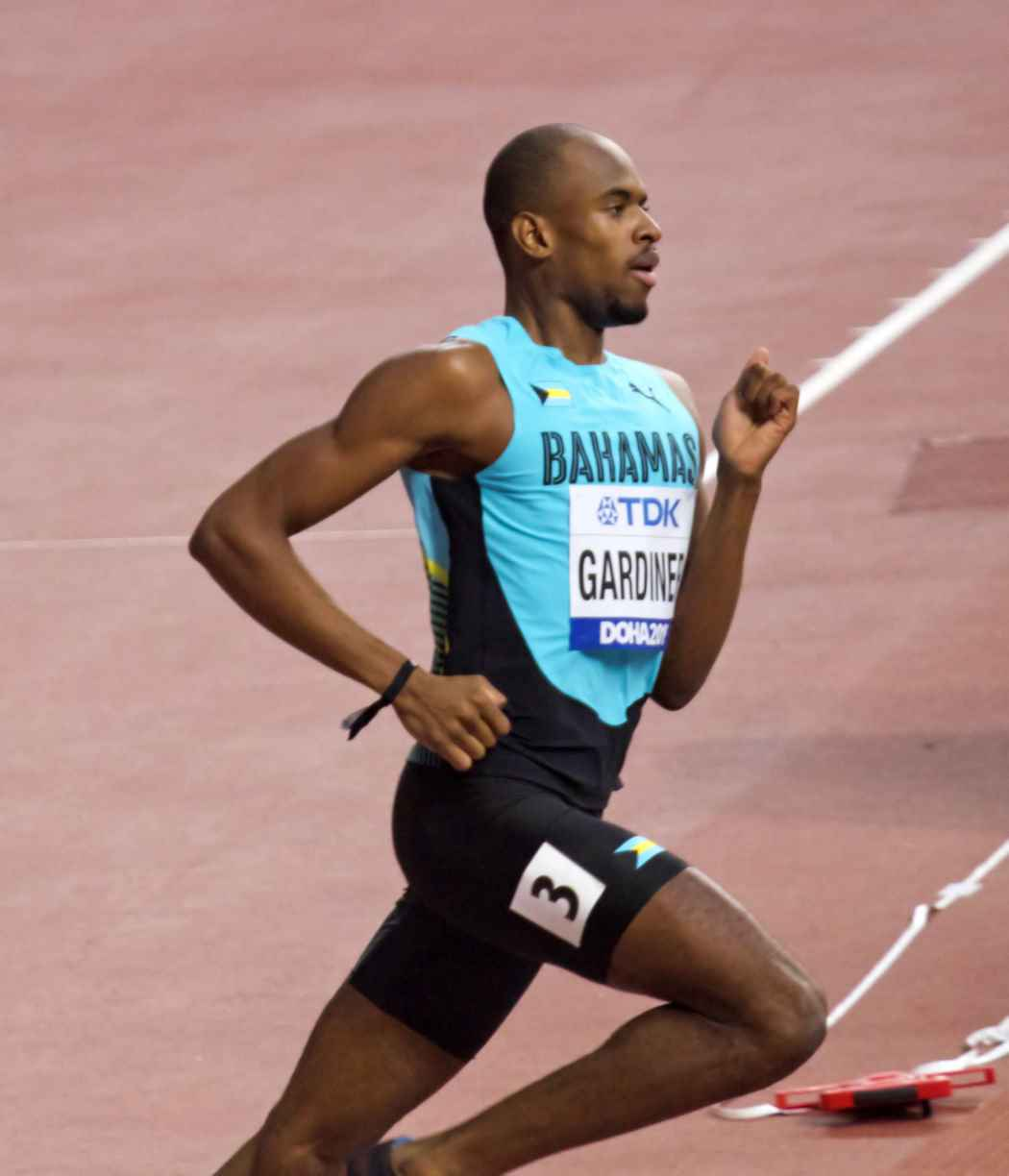
- Gardiner at the 2019 World Championships

Personal information
- Nationality: Bahamian
- Born: 12 September 1995 (age 31) Central Abaco, Abaco Islands, Bahamas
- Height: 1.96 m (6 ft 5 in)
- Weight: 94 kg (207 lb)

Sport
- Country: Bahamas
- Sport: Track and field
- Event: Sprints
- Coached by: Gary Evans

Achievements and titles
- Highest world ranking: 1 (weeks 36)
- Personal bests: 200 m: 19.75 NR (2018); 300 m: 31.52 NR (2022); 300 m (Indoor): 31.56 WB (2022); 400 m: 43.48 NR (2019)
Medal record
Men's athletics
Representing Bahamas
Olympic Games
Gold medal – first place	2020 Tokyo	400 m
Bronze medal – third place	2016 Rio de Janeiro	4 × 400 m relay
World Championships
Gold medal – first place	2019 Doha	400 m
Silver medal – second place	2017 London	400 m
World Relays
Gold medal – first place	2017 Nassau	4 × 400 m relay mixed
Silver medal – second place	2015 Nassau	4 × 400 m relay
CARIFTA Games (Junior)
Silver medal – second place	2014 Fort-de-France	4 × 100 m relay
Bronze medal – third place	2014 Fort-de-France	4 × 400 m relay

Steven Gardiner (born 12 September 1995) is a Bahamian track and field sprinter competing in the 400 metres and 200 metres. He is the 2020 Olympic and 2019 world champion in the 400 m, and also won the silver medal at the 2017 World Championships in that event. His winning time of 43.48 s from the 2019 World Championships is the Bahamian record and makes him the eighth‑fastest man in the history of the event. Gardiner also owns the Bahamian records in the outdoor 300 m and 200 m, with times of 31.83 s and 19.75 s respectively, and the world best in the indoor 300 m at 31.56 s.

== Early life ==
Gardiner was born in Murphy Town, Central Abaco, in the Bahamas. During his teenage years Gardiner was a competitive volleyball player, but also ran track and field. Gardiner wanted to transition to track and field in the shorter sprints, but his high school coach said he was too tall, so he became a 400 m runner. He went to Moores Island All-Age School, where he was a part of the Exterminators Track and Field Club, Coached by Pastor Anthony Williams. Moore's Island is a small island off the coast of mainland Abaco Islands.

== Career ==
Gardiner competed in the sport in his teenage years and ran in the 400 m at the national championships in 2013. He entered three events at the 2014 CARIFTA Games: he only managed fourth in the individual 200 m but claimed a silver in the 4 × 100 m relay and a bronze in the 4 × 400 m relay. He marked himself as one of the Bahamas' top young athletes with a win at the Bahamian junior championships in June of that year. An appearance at the 2014 World Junior Championships in Athletics resulted in a semi-final run in the 200 m and a sixth-place finish in the 4 × 400 m.

His first senior medal came at the 2015 IAAF World Relays, held on home turf, where he gave American competitor Jeremy Wariner a close run in the 4 × 400 m relay, helping the Bahamas to the silver medal alongside Ramon Miller, Michael Mathieu and Chris Brown. He began to focus on the 400 m in the 2015 season, which proved a successful transition. He rapidly improved to become the youngest Bahamian ever, at 19 years old, to run the distance in under 45 seconds and moved up to fourth on the Bahamian all-time list with a best of 44.64 seconds. He set the time at the Bislett Games, which brought him victory on his debut on the IAAF Diamond League circuit, finishing ahead of Matthew Hudson-Smith and Pavel Maslák.

In 2019, he won the 400 m at the 2019 World Athletics Championships, finishing ahead of American favorite Fred Kerley in a national record of 43.48 s, which also made him the sixth fastest man in history after the race.

He won the 400 m at the 2020 Olympic Games in a time of 43.85. This was the joint fastest time in the world for the 2021 season.

In January 2022, he ran the fastest indoor 300 m of all time with a time of 31.56. He was unable to defend his World Championship 400 m title due to injury.

In April 2025, he signed as a racer in the Long Sprints event category for the 2025 Grand Slam Track season, replacing Quincy Hall.

== Statistics ==
All information from World Athletics profile unless otherwise noted.

=== Personal bests ===
Event	Time	Venue	Date	Notes
200 m	19.75	Coral Gables, Florida, U.S.	7 April 2018	(+0.3 m/s wind) NR
300 m	31.56	Columbia, South Carolina, U.S.	28 January 2022	WR
400 m	43.48	Doha, Qatar	4 October 2019	NR
4 × 400 m relay	2:57.72	Gainesville, Florida, U.S.	16 April 2022	

=== International competitions ===
The two highlighted times are track records. Gardiner also holds the track record for Székesfehérvár in Hungary where he ran 43.74 seconds in July 2023.

Year	Competition	Venue	Position	Event	Notes
Representing the Bahamas
2014	CARIFTA Games (U20)	Fort-de-France, Martinique	4th	200 m	20.87 (+1.3 m/s wind)
2014	CARIFTA Games (U20)	Fort-de-France, Martinique	2nd	4 × 100 m relay	40.35
2014	CARIFTA Games (U20)	Fort-de-France, Martinique	3rd	4 × 400 m relay	3:11.32
2014	World Junior Championships	Eugene, United States	12th (sf)	200 m	20.89 (+1.8 m/s wind)
2014	World Junior Championships	Eugene, United States	6th	4 × 400 m relay	3:08.08
2015	World Relays	Nassau, Bahamas	2nd	4 × 400 m relay	2:58.91
2015	World Championships	Beijing, China	16th (sf)	400 m	44.98
2015	World Championships	Beijing, China	DQ	4 × 400 m relay	Lane violation
2016	Olympic Games	Rio de Janeiro, Brazil	11th (sf)	400 m	44.72
2016	Olympic Games	Rio de Janeiro, Brazil	3rd	4 × 400 m relay	2:58.49
2017	World Relays	Nassau, Bahamas	9th (sf)	4 × 400 m relay	3:05.37
2017	World Relays	Nassau, Bahamas	1st	4 × 400 m relay mixed	3:14.42
2017	World Championships	London, United Kingdom	2nd	400 m	44.41
2019	World Championships	Doha, Qatar	1st	400 m	43.48 NR
2021	Olympic Games	Tokyo, Japan	1st	400 m	43.85
2023	World Championships	Budapest, Hungary	3rd (h)	400 m	44.65^{1}
2026	Commonwealth Games	Glasgow, United Kingdom	19th (h)	200 m	20.85

^{1}Did not finish in the semifinals

=== Circuit performances ===
Grand Slam Track results
Slam	Race group	Event	Pl.	Time	Prize money
2025 Miami Slam	Long sprints	200 m	4th	20.37	US$12,500
2025 Miami Slam	Long sprints	400 m		DNF	US$12,500
2025 Philadelphia Slam	Long sprints	400 m	8th	46.88	US$15,000
2025 Philadelphia Slam	Long sprints	200 m	3rd	20.49	US$15,000

==== Wins and titles ====
- Diamond League
  - Oslo: 2015
  - Doha: 2017, 2018, 2024
  - Stockholm: 2017
  - Shanghai: 2018
  - Monaco: 2019
  - Paris: 2022
  - Rabat: 2023

Olympic Games
Preceded by Joanna Evans; Donald Thomas	Flag bearer for Bahamas; Paris 2024 with Devynne Charlton	Succeeded by Incumbent
