= Lanece Clarke =

Bahamian sprinter

Personal information
- Born: 4 November 1987 (age 37) Nassau, Bahamas
- Education: McKendree University

Sport
- Sport: Athletics
- Event: 400 metres

Lanece Clarke (born 4 November 1987) is a Bahamian sprinter. She competed in the 4 × 400 metres relay at the 2013 and 2015 World Championships and the 2016 Olympic Games without qualifying for the final. Clarke attended CR.Walker High School in Nassau, Bahamas and McKendree University where she was inducted into the Hall of fame in 2021.

== International competitions ==
Year	Competition	Venue	Position	Event	Notes
Representing the Bahamas
2003	CARIFTA Games (U17)	Port of Spain, Trinidad and Tobago	3rd	4 × 400 m relay	3:53.86
2005	CARIFTA Games (U20)	Bacolet, Trinidad and Tobago	5th	200 m	24.41
2005	CARIFTA Games (U20)	Bacolet, Trinidad and Tobago	8th	400 m	58.84
2006	Central American and Caribbean; Junior Championships (U20)	Port of Spain, Trinidad	2nd	4 × 100 m relay	45.71
2006	Central American and Caribbean; Junior Championships (U20)	Port of Spain, Trinidad	4th	4 × 400 m relay	3:49.74
2006	World Junior Championships	Beijing, China	11th (h)	4 × 100 m relay	45.41
2011	Central American and Caribbean Championships	Mayagüez, Puerto Rico	11th (h)	400 m	54.32
2013	Central American and Caribbean Championships	Morelia, Mexico	11th (h)	400 m	54.38
2013	Central American and Caribbean Championships	Morelia, Mexico	3rd	4 × 400 m relay	3:36.41
2013	World Championships	Moscow, Russia	13th (h)	4 × 400 m relay	3:32.91
2014	IAAF World Relays	Nassau, Bahamas	2nd (B)	4 × 400 m relay	3:31.71
2014	Commonwealth Games	Glasgow, United Kingdom	29th (h)	400 m	55.24
2014	Commonwealth Games	Glasgow, United Kingdom	7th	4 × 400 m relay	3:34.86
2015	Pan American Games	Toronto, Canada	12th (h)	400 m	54.33
2015	Pan American Games	Toronto, Canada	5th	4 × 400 m relay	3:31.60
2015	NACAC Championships	San José, Costa Rica	11th (h)	400 m	53.41
2015	NACAC Championships	San José, Costa Rica	3rd	4 × 400 m relay	3:31.80
2015	World Championships	Beijing, China	10th (h)	4 × 400 m relay	3:28.46
2016	Olympic Games	Rio de Janeiro, Brazil	11th (h)	4 × 400 m relay	3:26.36
2017	World Championships	London, United Kingdom	–	4 × 400 m relay	DNF

== Personal bests ==
Outdoor

- 100 metres – 11.74 (+0.2 m/s, Edwardsville 2008)
- 200 metres – 23.41 (Nassau 2014)
- 400 metres – 52.43 (Nassau 2014)

Indoor

- 200 metres – 23.86 (Birmingham, AL 2014)
- 400 metres – 53.40 (Blacksburg 2014)
