= Shavez Hart =

Bahamian sprinter (1992–2022)

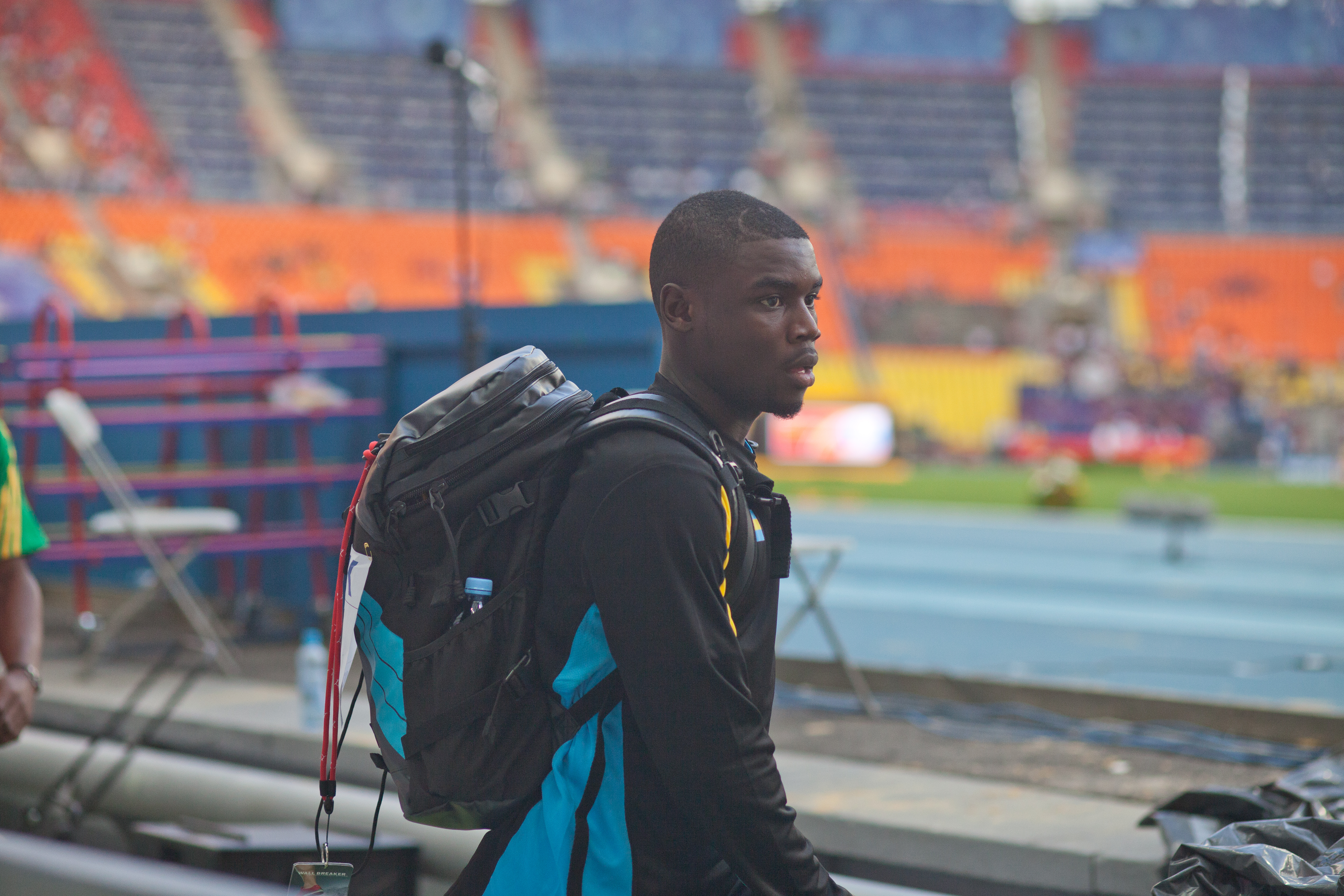
- Hart at the 2013 World Championships

Personal information
- Born: 6 September 1992 Abaco Islands, Bahamas
- Died: 3 September 2022 (aged 29) Abaco Islands, Bahamas
- Education: Texas A&M

Sport
- Country: Bahamas
- Sport: Athletics
- Event: 100 metres
Medal record
World Indoor Championships
Silver medal – second place	2016 Portland	4 × 400 m relay
CAC Championships
Gold medal – first place	2013 Morelia	4×100 m relay
Pan American Junior Championships
Bronze medal – third place	2011 Miramar	4×100 m relay
CARIFTA Games Junior (U20)
Bronze medal – third place	2011 Montego Bay	4×100 m relay
Bronze medal – third place	2011 Montego Bay	100 m

Shavez Hart (6 September 1992 – 3 September 2022) was a Bahamian track and field sprinter from Coopers Town Abaco Islands, who mainly competed in the 100 metres and 200 metres. His 100 metres personal best of 10.10 seconds makes him the third fastest Bahamian of all time behind Derrick Atkins, and second fastest Bahamian-born sprinter. His 200 metres personal best of 20.23 makes him the fourth fastest Bahamian of all time.

He was a graduate of St. Georges High School in Freeport, Bahamas. He was the bronze medallist in the 100 m individual and relay events at the 2011 CARIFTA Games. At the 2011 Pan American Junior Athletics Championships he false started in the 100 m final but took the bronze with the Bahamian relay quartet.

He competed for South Plains College with compatriot Trevorvano Mackey, winning a sprint double at the 2012 National Junior College Championships, before transferring to Texas A&M University. They both teamed up to break the Bahamian national record in the 4×100 metres relay in Morelia, Mexico, winning the gold medal at the 2013 CAC Championships in the process.

On 3 September 2022, Hart was shot in the chest and killed during a parking lot brawl in North Abaco, two days before his 30th birthday.

== Personal bests ==
Event	Time	Venue	Date
60 metres	6.65	College Station, Texas, United States	15 February 2013
100 metres	10.10	Waco, Texas, United States	18 April 2015
200 metres	20.23	Starkville, Mississippi, United States	16 May 2015
