= Bianca Stuart =

Bahamian long jumper

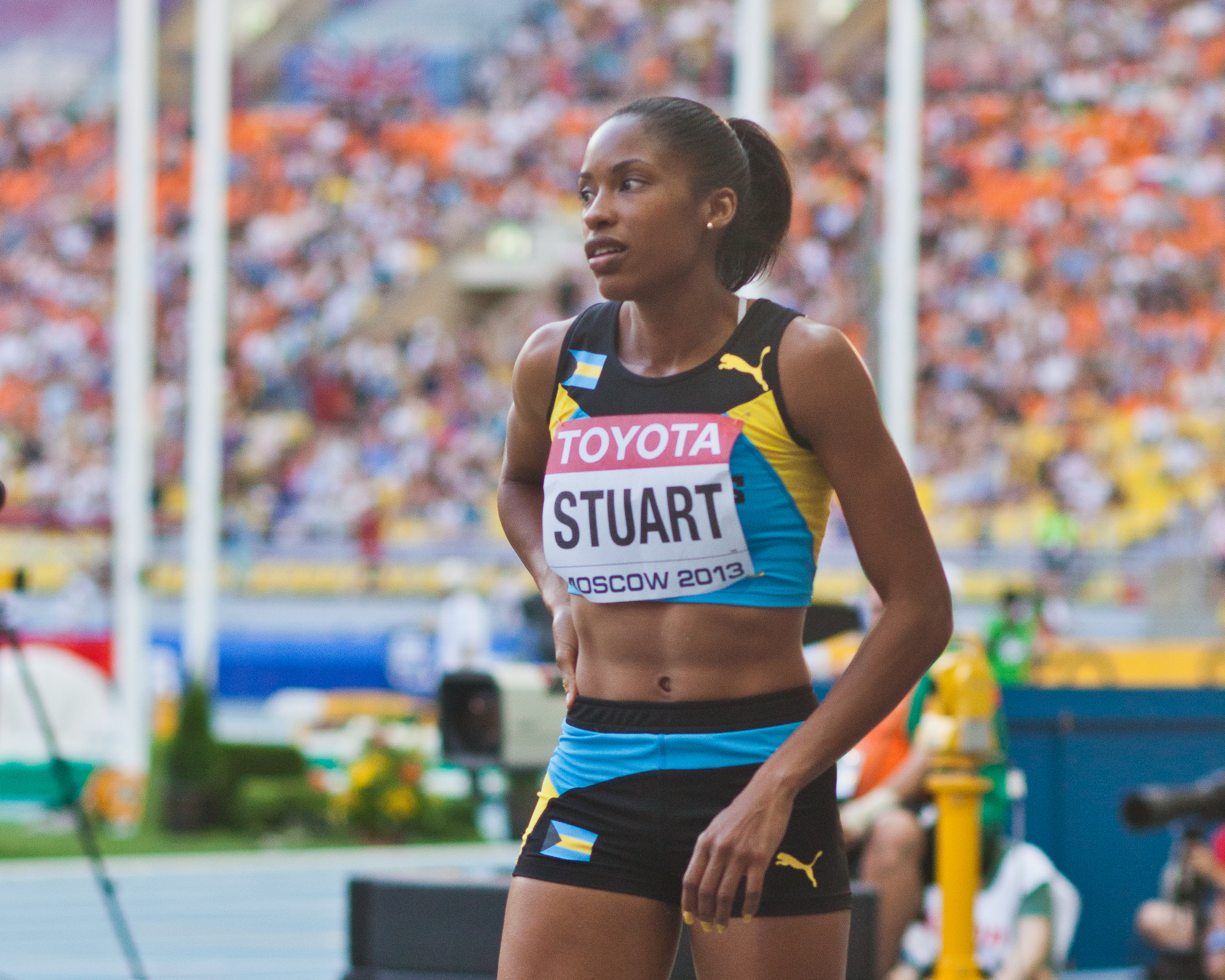
- Stuart during 2013 World Championships in Athletics in Moscow

Personal information
- Born: May 17, 1988 (age 38) Nassau, Bahamas

Sport
- Country: Bahamas
- Sport: Athletics
- Event: Long jump
- Coached by: Henry Rolle
Medal record
Women's athletics
Pan American Games
Silver medal – second place	2015 Toronto	Long jump
Central American and Caribbean Games
Bronze medal – third place	2010 Mayagüez	Long jump
CAC Championships
Gold medal – first place	2008 Cali	Long jump
Gold medal – first place	2011 Mayagüez	Long jump
Bronze medal – third place	2013 Morelia	Long jump
NACAC U-23 Championships
Silver medal – second place	2010 Miramar	Long jump
Bronze medal – third place	2008 Toluca	Long jump
Pan American Junior Championships
Silver medal – second place	2007 São Paulo	Long jump
CAC Junior Championships (U20)
Silver medal – second place	2006 Port of Spain	Long jump
CAC Junior Championships (U17)
Bronze medal – third place	2004 Coatzacoalcos	Long jump
Bronze medal – third place	2004 Coatzacoalcos	4x400 m relay
CARIFTA Games (U17)
Silver medal – second place	2002 Nassau	Long jump

Bianca Stuart (born May 17, 1988) is a Bahamian long jumper and national record holder with a 6.81 m jump in 2011.

Stuart competed for the Southern Illinois Salukis track and field team in the NCAA.

== Achievements ==
Year	Competition	Venue	Position	Event	Notes
Representing Bahamas
2002	CARIFTA Games	Nassau, Bahamas	2nd	Long jump	5.30 m
2002	Central American and Caribbean; Junior Championships (U17)	Bridgetown, Barbados	4th	400 m	5.30 m (-0.1 m/s)
2004	Central American and Caribbean; Junior Championships (U17)	Coatzacoalcos, Mexico	3rd	Long jump	5.71 m
2004	Central American and Caribbean; Junior Championships (U17)	Coatzacoalcos, Mexico	3rd	4 × 100 m relay	47.97
2006	Central American and Caribbean; Junior Championships (U20)	Port of Spain, Trinidad and Tobago	2nd	Long jump	6.09 m (0.0 m/s)
2006	World Junior Championships	Beijing, China	14th (q)	Long jump	6.05 m (-0.2 m/s)
2007	Pan American Junior Championships	São Paulo, Brazil	2nd	Long jump	6.12 m
2008	Central American and Caribbean Championships	Cali, Colombia	1st	Long jump	6.54 m
2008	NACAC U-23 Championships	Toluca, Mexico	3rd	Long jump	6.37m (NWI) A
2009	Central American and Caribbean Championships	Havana, Cuba	4th	Long jump	6.31 m
2010	Central American and Caribbean Games	Mayagüez, Puerto Rico	3rd	Long jump	6.50 m
2010	NACAC Under-23 Championships	Miramar, United States	2nd	Long jump	6.42m (-0.4 m/s)
2011	Central American and Caribbean Championships	Mayagüez, Puerto Rico	1st	Long jump	6.81 m
2011	World Championships	Daegu, South Korea	17th (q)	Long jump	6.44 m
2012	World Indoor Championships	Istanbul, Turkey	8th	Long jump	4.71 m
2012	Olympic Games	London, United Kingdom	18th (q)	Long jump	6.32 m
2013	Central American and Caribbean Championships	Morelia, Mexico	3rd	Long jump	6.42 m
2013	World Championships	Moscow, Russia	24th (q)	Long jump	6.35 m
2014	Commonwealth Games	Glasgow, United Kingdom	8th	Long jump	6.31 m
2015	Pan American Games	Toronto, Canada	2nd	Long jump	6.69 m
2015	World Championships	Beijing, China	25th (q)	Long jump	6.34 m
2016	Olympic Games	Rio de Janeiro, Brazil	16th (q)	Long jump	6.45 m
2017	World Championships	London, United Kingdom	28th (q)	Long jump	5.91 m
2018	Commonwealth Games	Gold Coast, Australia	8th	Long jump	6.30 m
2018	NACAC Championships	Toronto, Canada	6th	Long jump	6.09 m
