= Michael Mathieu =

Bahamian sprinter (born 1984)

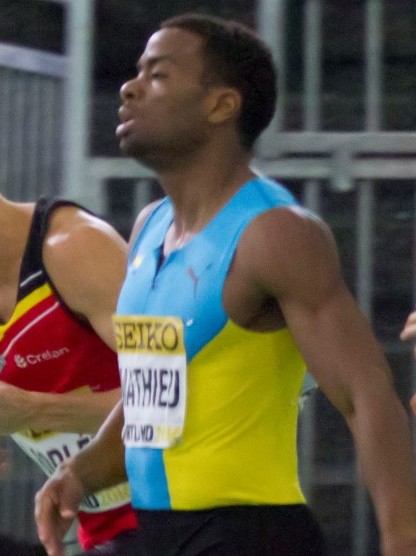
- Mathieu in 2016

Personal information
- Full name: Michael Walter Mathieu
- Nationality: Bahamian
- Born: 17 June 1984 (age 42) Freeport, Grand Bahama, Bahamas
- Height: 1.78 m (5 ft 10 in)

Sport
- Sport: Running
- Event: Sprint
Medal record
Olympic Games
Gold medal – first place	2012 London	4 × 400 m relay
Silver medal – second place	2008 Beijing	4 × 400 m relay
Bronze medal – third place	2016 Rio de Janeiro	4 × 400 m relay
World Championships
Silver medal – second place	2007 Osaka	4 × 400 m relay
World Indoor Championships
Silver medal – second place	2016 Portland	4 × 400 m relay
World Relay Championships
Gold medal – first place	2017 Nassau	4 × 400 m relay
Silver medal – second place	2014 Nassau	4 × 400 m relay
Silver medal – second place	2015 Nassau	4 × 400 m relay
Pan American Games
Gold medal – first place	2007 Rio de Janeiro	4 × 400 m relay
Central American and Caribbean Games
Silver medal – second place	2010 Mayaguez	4 × 400 m relay
CAC Championships
Gold medal – first place	2011 Mayagüez	200 m
Gold medal – first place	2011 Mayagüez	4 × 400 m relay
Silver medal – second place	2008 Cali	400 m
Silver medal – second place	2008 Cali	4 × 400 m relay
Commonwealth Games
Silver medal – second place	2014 Glasgow	4 × 400 m relay
Silver medal – second place	2018 Gold Coast	4 × 400 m relay
NACAC Championships
Silver medal – second place	2018 Toronto	4 × 400 m relay
Pan American Junior Championships
Bronze medal – third place	2003 Bridgetown	400 m
CAC Junior Championships (U20)
Silver medal – second place	2002 Bridgetown	4 × 400 m relay
Bronze medal – third place	2002 Bridgetown	4 × 100 m relay

Michael Walter Mathieu (born 24 June 1984) is a retired Bahamian sprinter hailing from Freeport, Grand Bahama who specialized in the 200 metres and 400 metres. He was part of the Bahamian silver medal-winning team in the men's 4 × 400 metres relay at the 2008 Beijing Olympics, running second leg and recording a 44.0 split, and the gold medal-winning team at the 2012 Summer Olympics. He was also a part of second place relay team at the 2007 World Championships. He won the bronze medal in the 4 × 400 metres relay in the 2016 Summer Olympics.

Individually, he has won medals at the Central American and Caribbean Championships, taking the 400 m silver medal in 2008 and the 200 m gold in 2011. His personal bests are 20.16 seconds for the 200 m and 45.06 for the 400 m (the former being the Bahamian record mark).

== Career ==
Mathieu attended St George's High School in the Bahamas, graduating in 2001 as their "Most Outstanding Athlete". He gained a sports scholarship to attend Southwestern Christian College in Texas, United States. As a junior athlete, he won two relay medals in the under-20 section of the 2002 CAC Junior Championships. The following year he took the 400 m bronze medal at the 2003 Pan American Junior Athletics Championships. Moving up the age categories, he won a 400 m relay bronze medal at the 2006 NACAC Under-23 Championships in Athletics.

In 2004 he began studying economics at Texas Tech University and started competing for the Texas Tech Red Raiders under coach Wes Kittley. In the 2005 indoor track and field season he was runner-up at the Big 12 Conference meet in the 400 m and 4 × 400 m relay. He earned All-American honours by reaching the NCAA indoor relay final, then achieved the same feat in the outdoor season. The 2006 indoor season was his last at Texas Tech: he set a 200 m personal best of 21.34 seconds and again reached the NCAA relay final.

He reached the senior international level at the 2007 World Championships and became a fixture in the Bahamian national team from then onwards. He ran in the heats, both individually and in the relay, at the 2008 IAAF World Indoor Championships, then won two silver medals in the events at the 2008 Central American and Caribbean Championships. At the 2008 Summer Olympics he reached the semi-finals of the 400 m and took the relay silver medal with a time of 2:58.03 minutes.

At the 2009 CAC Championships he came sixth in the 400 m final. He was selected for the national team at the 2009 World Championships in Athletics, but disqualifications meant he was out of the first round of both events. He performed better at the 2010 IAAF World Indoor Championships, reaching the semi-finals, but the team failed to finish the relay. Outdoors, he was a silver medalist in the relay at the 2010 CAC Games and fourth in the relay at the 2010 Commonwealth Games.

In 2011, a switch to focus on the 200 m event saw him have a career breakthrough. He ran a personal best of 20.38 seconds to win at the national championships then claimed the gold medal in the event at the 2011 Central American and Caribbean Championships in Athletics. He also won the relay, running with Avard Moncur and Ramon Miller. He represented Bahamas in the 200 m at the 2011 World Championships in Athletics, but failed to finish in his semi-final due to injury. He came close to medal at the 2011 Pan American Games, where he was fourth behind Brazil's Bruno de Barros.

He opened his 2012 season in strong form. Competing on the Brazilian Athletics Tour, he ran a Bahamian record of 20.16 seconds for the 200 m and set a personal best in the 400 m with a run 45.06 seconds. He also equalled his 100 metres best with a time of 10.30 seconds. He also won gold at the 2012 London Olympics with the Bahamas 4 × 400 m team beating medal favorites USA with a national record.

At the 2014 Commonwealth Games, he won a silver medal as part of the men's 4 × 400 m team.

At the 2016 Summer Olympics, Mathieu and the Bahamian team won the bronze medal in the 4 × 400 m relay. Another former Texas Tech athlete, Gil Roberts, was a member of the gold medal-winning USA team.

== Retirement ==
Mathieu retired after the 2021 Outdoor season with his last race being run on 5 June 2021 at the North American, Central American and Caribbean (NACAC) New Life Invitational Track and Field Meet in Miramar, Florida.. He ran on a leg of the Bahamian 4x400 Metres Relay in a time of 3:03.51. The team was attempting to qualify for the 2020 Olympic Games.

Mathieu now lives in Orlando, Florida with his wife and two sons. He coaches youth basketball for the Jr. Magic Warriors, along with owning a speed training camp company to help build speed for different sports.
