= Warren Fraser =

Bahamian sprinter

Personal information
- Born: 8 July 1991 (age 35) Nassau, Bahamas

Sport
- Sport: Track and field
Medal record
Representing Bahamas
NACAC U-23 Championships
Silver medal – second place	2012 Irapuato	4x100 m relay
CARIFTA Games Junior (U20)
Silver medal – second place	2009 Vieux Fort	100 m
CARIFTA Games Youth (U17)
Silver medal – second place	2006 Les Abymes	4x100 m relay
Silver medal – second place	2007 Providenciales	100 m

Warren Fraser (born July 8, 1991) is a male track and field athlete from Nassau in the Bahamas, who mainly competes in the 100m.

His personal best over 100m is 10.14 seconds. He qualified for the 100m at the 2012 Olympic Games, and came fourth in his heat. He was also part of the Bahamian 4 × 100 m team that ran the 4 × 100 m national record at the Commonwealth Games.

In 2014, he competed at the 2014 Commonwealth Games, reaching the final in the men's 100 m and the 4 × 100 m. He also competed at the 2018 Commonwealth Games. He has also competed at the 2013, 2015 and 2017 World Championships. He studied at Clemson University.

== Personal bests ==
Event	Time	Venue	Date
100 m	10.14	Nassau, Bahamas	June 27, 2014
200 m	20.85	Tucson, Arizona	March 31, 2012
400 m	48.99	Atlanta, Georgia	May 1, 2010
60 m	6.54 (indoor)	Birmingham, Alabama	January 18, 2014
400 m	49.30 (indoor)	Blacksburg, Virginia	February 26, 2010
