= Ramon Miller =

Bahamian sprinter

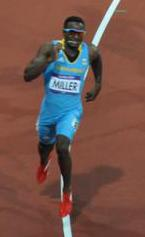

Personal information
- Full name: Ramon Salomon Miller
- Born: 17 February 1987 (age 39) Nassau, New Providence, Bahamas
- Education: Dickinson State University
- Height: 1.70 m (5 ft 7 in)
- Weight: 67 kg (148 lb)

Sport
- Country: Bahamas
- Sport: Athletics
- Event: 4 × 400 m Relay
Medal record
Olympic Games
| Gold medal – first place | 2012 London | 4 × 400 m relay |
| Silver medal – second place | 2008 Beijing | 4 × 400 m relay |
Commonwealth Games
| Silver medal – second place | 2018 Gold Coast | 4 × 400 m relay |
| Bronze medal – third place | 2010 Delhi | 400 m |
World Relay Championships
| Silver medal – second place | 2014 Nassau | 4 × 400 m relay |
| Silver medal – second place | 2015 Nassau | 4 × 400 m relay |
Pan American Games
| Bronze medal – third place | 2011 Guadalajara | 400 m |
CAC Championships
| Gold medal – first place | 2011 Mayagüez | 4 × 400 m relay |
| Silver medal – second place | 2008 Cali | 4 × 400 m relay |
| Silver medal – second place | 2011 Mayagüez | 400 m |
NACAC Championships
| Silver medal – second place | 2015 Costa Rica | 4 × 400 m relay |
CAC Junior Championships (U20)
| Bronze medal – third place | 2006 Port of Spain | 4 × 400 m relay |
CARIFTA Games Junior (U20)
| Gold medal – first place | 2005 Bacolet | 800 m |

Ramon Salomon Miller (born 17 February 1987) is a Bahamian sprinter.

He was inducted into the Dickinson State University Hall of Fame class of 2020.

== Career ==
He was part of the Bahamas' silver medal-winning team in the men's 4 × 400 m relay at the 2008 Beijing Olympics, after running in the heats.

Miller is a former athlete at Dickinson State University where he won nine NAIA track and field national championships in his four-year career. Miller was named the most outstanding performer of his final NAIA national meet after winning the open 400-meter dash and helping the 4 × 200 and 4 × 400 relay teams win titles.

Miller won a bronze medal at the XIX Commonwealth Games, in Delhi, India. A year later he won a bronze medal at the 2011 Pan American Games in Guadalajara, Mexico. He also won gold at the 2012 London Olympics with the Bahamas 4 × 400 m team beating medal favorites USA with a national record. Miller ran the anchor leg in the finals to bring a gold medal to the Bahamas.

== Post Olympics ==
In 2020, Miller became a member of the Royal Bahamas Police Force.

In 2021, he went public with his struggle to get the home he built on land gifted to him by the government connected to utilities. He was finally connected to utilities in 2023. He stated, "I feel like I’m part of the country now".

== Achievements ==
| Year | Competition | Venue | Position | Event | Notes |
Representing Bahamas
| 2003 | CARIFTA Games (U-17) | Port of Spain, Trinidad and Tobago | 6th (h) | 800 m | 2:09.82 |
| 2005 | CARIFTA Games (U-20) | Bacolet, Trinidad and Tobago | 1st | 800 m | 1:54.53 |
| 2005 | CARIFTA Games (U-20) | Bacolet, Trinidad and Tobago | 8th | 1500 m | 4:13.41 |
| 2006 | Central American and Caribbean Junior Championships (U-20) | Port of Spain, Trinidad and Tobago | 4th | 400 m | 46.55 |
| 2006 | Central American and Caribbean Junior Championships (U-20) | Port of Spain, Trinidad and Tobago | 3rd | 4 × 400 m relay | 3:09.09 |
| 2006 | World Junior Championships | Beijing, China | 13th (h) | 4 × 400 m relay | 3:10.71 |
| 2008 | NACAC U-23 Championships | Toluca, Mexico | 9th (h) | 400 m | 48.78 A |
| 2008 | Olympic Games | Beijing, China | 2nd | 4 × 400 m relay | 2:58.03 |
| 2012 | Olympic Games | London, United Kingdom | 1st | 4 × 400 m relay | 2:56.72 |
| 2015 | NACAC Championships | San José, Costa Rica | 2nd | 4 × 400 m relay | 3:00.53 |
| 2015 | World Championships | Beijing, China | — | 4 × 400 m | DSQ |
