= Christopher Belcher =

American sprinter (born 1994)

Personal information
- Born: January 29, 1994 (age 32) Sayville, New York, U.S.
- Height: 5 ft 11 in (180 cm)

Sport
- Country: United States
- Sport: Running, track and field
- Event: Sprints
- College team: North Carolina A&T Aggies (2016, 2017); Monroe Mustangs (2014, 2015)
- Team: Nike
- Turned pro: 2017
- Coached by: Duane Ross

Achievements and titles
- Personal best(s): 100 m: 9.93 s (Eugene, 2017); 200 m: 20.01 s (Eugene, 2017)
Medal record
Men's athletics
Representing the United States
World Relays
Gold medal – first place	2019 Yokohama	4×200 m relay
Representing Nike
United States Championships
Bronze medal – third place	2017 Sacramento	100 m
Bronze medal – third place	2019 Des Moines	100 m
Representing North Carolina A&T
NCAA Division I Championships
Bronze medal – third place	2017 Eugene	100 m
Bronze medal – third place	2017 Eugene	4×100 m relay
Representing Monroe College
NJCAA Division I Championships
Bronze medal – third place	2014 Mesa	100 m

Christopher Belcher (born January 29, 1994, in Sayville, New York) is an American professional track and field sprinter who specializes in the 100 meters and the 200 meters. While in college he competed for the Monroe Mustangs and then the North Carolina A&T Aggies. He is currently sponsored by Nike.

In 2017 he competed at the World Championships in the 100 m, making it to the semi-finals. His personal best time in the 100 m is 9.93 seconds, set during the NCAA Division I Championships earlier that year.

== Biography ==
=== Early life ===
Raised in Sayville, New York, Belcher attended Sayville High School. During his 3 varsity seasons, he won the state championship at the 55 m and was ranked 8th nationally. He also won the Division 1 100 m dash state championship race his junior year. Belcher also competed and won the high school 55 m dash at the 2013 Millrose Games.

=== Amateur career ===
In 2013, Belcher signed with Monroe College; In his freshman year, he placed 3rd in the 100 m at the 2014 NJCAA Division I Championships behind Odean Skeen and Andre De Grasse. In 2016, Belcher transferred to NCAA Division I school North Carolina A&T. At A&T, Belcher was the 100 m, 200 m, and 4 × 100 m relay champion at the 2016 MEAC Championships, breaking meet records in all three events. He then went on to compete at the 2016 NCAA Division I Championships in the 100 m, but did not qualify for the finals.

Following his success in 2016, Belcher then went on to defend his 100 m and 200 m titles at the 2017 MEAC Championships. In the 100 m finals, Belcher broke the meet record that he set the previous year with a time of 10.04 s. Belcher, along with teammates Rodney Rowe, Caleb Gabriel, and Joel Thomas defended their title in the 4 × 100 m relay with a time of 39.44 s, breaking their own MEAC championship record from the previous year. During the semifinals of the 2017 NCAA Division I Championships, Belcher broke the 10-second barrier with a personal best time of 9.93 s. Belcher went on to finish 3rd in the 100 m, 5th in the 200 m, and 3rd in the 4 × 100 m relay.

=== Professional career ===
Belcher qualified for the 2017 USA Championships in the 100 m. At the event, Belcher ran his last amateur race in the semifinals. Deciding to forego his final year of NCAA eligibility, he signed a professional contract with Nike. In the finals of the 100 m, Belcher finished 3rd behind Justin Gatlin and Christian Coleman, qualifying for the World Championships in London. In London he made it through the heats but was unable to advance through the semis.

== Statistics ==
Information from World Athletics profile unless otherwise noted.

=== Personal bests ===
Event	Time (s)	Wind (m/s)	Competition	Venue	Date
100 m	9.93	+1.6	NCAA Division I Championships	Eugene, Oregon, US	June 7, 2017
200 m	20.01	+1.6	NCAA Division I Championships	Eugene, Oregon, US	June 7, 2017
4×100 m relay	38.30	—N/a	Herculis	Monaco	July 21, 2017
4×200 m relay	1:19.73	—N/a	World Relays	Yokohama, Japan	May 12, 2019

=== 100 meters progression ===
Year	Time	Venue	Date
2012	10.76	Cicero, New York, US	June 8
2013	10.71	Middletown, New York, US	June 8
2014	10.27	Mesa, Arizona, US	May 16
2015	10.46	Mahwah, New Jersey, US	April 4
2016	10.07	Greensboro, North Carolina, US	May 5
2017	9.93	Eugene, Oregon, US	June 7
2018	—	—	—
2019	10.05	Montverde, Florida, US	July 6
2020	10.26	Des Moines, Iowa, US	August 29
2021	10.01	Walnut, California, US	May 9
2021	10.01	Eugene, Oregon, US	June 19

=== 200 meters progression ===
Year	Time	Venue	Date
2012	21.77	Cicero, New York, US	June 9
2013	21.81	Middletown, New York, US	June 8
2014	21.40	Mesa, Arizona, US	May 16
2015	21.40	Chester, Pennsylvania, US	March 28
2016	20.39	Greensboro, North Carolina, US	May 5
2017	20.01	Eugene, Oregon, US	June 7
2018	21.09	Birmingham, Alabama, US	January 13
2019	20.42	St. George's, Grenada	April 13
2020	20.86	Doha, Qatar	September 25
2021	21.35	Jacksonville, Florida, US	April 16

=== International championship results ===
Representing the United States
Year	Competition	Venue	Position	Event	Time	Wind (m/s)	Notes
2017	World Championships	London, England	13th	100 m	10.20	−0.2	
2019	World Relays	Yokohama, Japan	1st	4×200 m relay	1:20.12	—N/a	
2019	The Match Europe v USA	Minsk, Belarus	1st	4×100 m relay	38.26	—N/a	
2019	The Match Europe v USA	Minsk, Belarus	2nd	100 m	10.25	—N/a	
2019	World Championships	Doha, Qatar	25th	100 m	10.23	−0.3	

=== National championship results ===
Representing the Monroe Mustangs (2014–2015), North Carolina A&T Aggies (2016–2017), and Nike (2017–2019)
Year	Competition	Venue	Position	Event	Time	Wind (m/s)	Notes
2014	NJCAA Indoor Championships	New York, New York	11th	60 m	6.86	—N/a	
2014	NJCAA Indoor Championships	New York, New York	8th	200 m	21.78	—N/a	
2014	NJCAA Division I Championships	Mesa, Arizona	3rd	100 m	10.27	+0.9	PB
2014	NJCAA Division I Championships	Mesa, Arizona	15th	200 m	21.40	−0.1	PB
2014	NJCAA Division I Championships	Mesa, Arizona	7th	4×100 m relay	40.50	—N/a	PB
2015	NJCAA Indoor Championships	Albuquerque, New Mexico	5th	60 m	6.78	—N/a	
2015	NJCAA Indoor Championships	Albuquerque, New Mexico	6th	200 m	21.49	—N/a	
2015	NJCAA Division I Championships	Hutchinson, Kansas	DQ	100 m	—	+4.9	False start
2015	NJCAA Division I Championships	Hutchinson, Kansas	15th	4×100 m relay	41.11	—N/a	SB
2016	NCAA Division I Championships	Eugene, Oregon	24th	100 m	10.71	+1.3	
2016	NCAA Division I Championships	Eugene, Oregon	14th	4×100 m relay	39.65	—N/a	PB
2017	NCAA Division I Championships	College Station, Texas	9th	60 m	6.64	—N/a	PB
2017	NCAA Division I Championships	College Station, Texas	15th	200 m	21.02	—N/a	
2017	NCAA Division I Championships	Eugene, Oregon	3rd	100 m	10.19	−2.1	
2017	NCAA Division I Championships	Eugene, Oregon	5th	200 m	20.66	−3.1	
2017	NCAA Division I Championships	Eugene, Oregon	3rd	4×100 m relay	38.57	—N/a	(Note: Belcher ran the 4 X 100 relay along with: Malcolm Croom-Mcfadden, Akeem Sirleaf, Michael Dickson, & Rodney Rowe.)
2017	USATF Championships	Sacramento, California	3rd	100 m	10.06	−0.7	
2019	USATF Championships	Des Moines, Iowa	3rd	100 m	10.12	−1.0	10.120 s
2019	USATF Championships	Des Moines, Iowa	10th	200 m	20.59	−1.4	
2021	US Olympic Trials	Eugene, Oregon	10th	100 m	10.11	+0.7	

NCAA results from Track & Field Results Reporting System.
