= Rodney Rowe =

Rodney Rowe may refer to:

- Rodney Rowe (athlete) (born 1997), American sprinter
- Rodney Rowe (footballer) (born 1975), English footballer
