= Hope Bender =

American track and field athlete (born 1997)

Hope Bender-Haugh
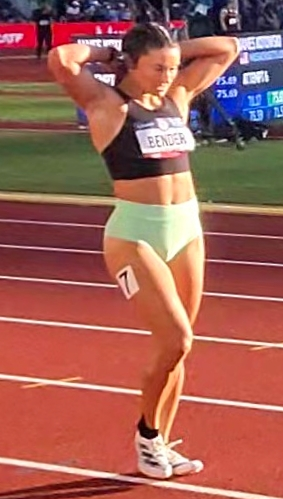
- Bender at the 2024 United States Olympic trials

Personal information
- Nationality: United States
- Born: January 2, 1997 (age 29) Newport Beach, California, U.S.
- Education: University of California, Santa Barbara
- Height: 5 ft 5 in (165 cm)

Sport
- Sport: Running; Track and field
- Event: heptathlon
- College team: UC Santa Barbara Gauchos
- Club: Santa Barbara Track Club; 2019-21
- Turned pro: 2019
- Coached by: Cody Fleming '21-'23; Josh Priester '19-'21; Gray Horn '17-'19

Achievements and titles
- Personal bests: 400 Metres Hurdles: 56.64 s (Santa Barbara 2019) Heptathlon: 5955 points (Austin 2019); 100 m hurdles: 13.33 s (Austin 2018); High Jump: 1.72 m (5 ft 7 1/2 in) (Birmingham 2019); Shot Put: 12.66 m (41 ft 6 1/4 in) (Birmingham 2019); 200 m: 23.63 s (Austin 2019); Javelin Throw: 38.30 m (125 ft 7 in) (Azusa 2019); Long Jump: 6.29 m (20 ft 7 1/2 in) (Austin 2019) 800 Metres: 2:10.10 (Austin 2019)

Hope Bender-Haugh (born January 2, 1997, in Newport Beach, California) is an American track and field athlete, known for multiple events and hurdles. She competed for the Santa Barbara Track Club and coached at UC Santa Barbara Gauchos before moving to San Marcos, Texas to train at Texas State University in Fall 2023. Bender studied to be a Biotechnology engineer.

== Professional ==
Hope Bender competed in Des Moines, Iowa, at the 2019 USA Track & Field Outdoor Championships and Clovis, California, at the 2016 USATF Junior Championships.

Outdoor Track and Field	Place	Score	100 meters hurdles	High jump	Shot Put	200 meters	Long Jump	Javelin	800 metres
Representing Team USA United States
2023 Thorpe Cup	DNF; 9th	4656 points							
2019 Thorpe Cup	9th	5449 points	985 points 13.95 s	759 points 1.62 m (5 ft 3 3/4 in)	625 points 11.45 m (37 ft 6 3/4 in)	932 points 24.51 s	789 points 5.80 m (19 ft 1/4 in)	527 points 32.66 m (107 ft 1 3/4 in)	832 points 2:19.38
USA Outdoor Track and Field Championships
2024 USA Olympic Trials	15th	5614 points	1084 points 13.49 s	897 points 1.67 m (5 ft 5 1/2 in)	780 points 13.14 m (43 ft 1 1/4 in)	1019 points 24.18 s	830 points 5.22 m (17 ft 1 1/2 in)	523 points 29.83 m (97 ft 10 1/4 in)	863 points 2:18.00
2023 USA Outdoor Track and Field Championships	8th	5726 points	1067 points 13.69 s	916 points 1.69 m (5 ft 6 1/2 in)	705 points 11.92 m (39 ft 1 1/4 in)	1000 points 24.39 s	981 points 5.92 m (19 ft 5 in)	593 points 33.69 m (110 ft 6 1/4 in)	905 points 2:15.28
2022 USA Outdoor Track and Field Championships	12th DNF	points	1018 points 13.72 s	855 points 1.70 m (5 ft 6 3/4 in)	645 points 11.76 m (38 ft 6 3/4 in)	900 points 24.86 s	points Foul P P	DNS	DNS
2021 USA Olympic Trials	9th	5867 points	1070 points 13.60 s	1004 points 1.78 m (5 ft 10 in)	783 points 13.19 m (43 ft 3 1/4 in)	982 points 24.40 s	932 points 5.69 m (18 ft 8 in)	575 points 32.68 m (107 ft 2 1/2 in)	932 points 2:13.61
2019 USA Track & Field Outdoor Championships	12th	5824 points	1010 points 13.78 s	818 points 1.67 m (5 ft 5 1/2 in)	714 points 13.25 m (43 ft 5 1/2 in)	955 points 24.27 s	834 points 5.95 m (19 ft 6 1/4 in)	621 points 37.59 m (123 ft 3 3/4 in)	900 points 2:14.49
Representing UCSB Gauchos
2016 USATF Junior Championships	13th	4436 points	980 points 13.99 s +2.4	678 points 1.55 m (5 ft 1 in)	517 points 9.81 m (32 ft 2 in)	885 points 25.02 s +1.7	603 points 5.16 m (16 ft 11 in) +1.5	0 points Foul; 0.0 m (0 in)	773 points 2:23.76

Hope Bender competed in Albuquerque, New Mexico at the 2018 USA Indoor Track and Field Championships. She placed 5th in the 2018 USA Indoor Track and Field Championships pentathlon.

2025 USA Indoor Track and Field Championships	11th	400m	53.74				
USA Indoor Track and Field Championships	Place	Score	60 meters hurdles	High jump	Shot Put	Long Jump	800 metres
2024 USA Indoor Track and Field Championships	3rd	4392 points	1030 points 8.44 seconds	867 points 1.71 m (5 ft 7 1/4 in)	743 points 13.24 m (43 ft 5 1/4 in)	825 points 5.92 m (19 ft 5 in)	927 points 2:12.62
2023 USA Indoor Track and Field Championships	2nd	4445 points	1063 points 8.44 seconds	984 points 1.76 m (5 ft 9 1/4 in)	752 points 12.69 m (41 ft 7 1/2 in)	1007 points 6.04 m (19 ft 9 3/4 in)	977 points 2:13.25
2022 USA Indoor Track and Field Championships	8th DNF	points	1021 points 8.48 seconds	736 points 1.60 m (5 ft 2 3/4 in)	745 points 13.27 m (43 ft 6 1/4 in)	DNS	DNS
Representing Santa Barbara Track Club
2020 USA Indoor Track and Field Championships	4th	4277 points	1013 points 8.52 seconds	855 points 1.70 m (5 ft 6 3/4 in)	684 points 12.34 m (40 ft 5 3/4 in)	834 points 5.95 m (19 ft 6 1/4 in)	891 points 2:15.13
Representing UC Santa Barbara
2018 USA Indoor Track and Field Championships	5th	4149 points	993 points 8.61	830 points 1.68 m (5 ft 6 in)	680 points 12.28 m (40 ft 3 1/4 in)	777 points 5.76 m (18 ft 10 3/4 in)	869 points 2:16.68

== NCAA ==
Hope Bender is a UC Santa Barbara Gauchos alumna and won 6 Big West Conference titles.

Hope Bender is a 4-time USTFCCCA NCAA Division I All-American at UCSB.

UCSB's Bender finishes fourth at 2019 NCAA outdoor track and field championship.

UCSB Gauchos’s Hope Bender Named Athlete of Meet at 2019 Big West Championships hosted by UC Santa Barbara Gauchos track and field helping the women's team to place 2nd in Big West Championships.

UCSB Gauchos’s Hope Bender Named Athlete of Meet at 2018 Big West Championships hosted by Cal State Northridge Matadors.

Representing University of California, Santa Barbara
Year	NCAA Division I Indoor track and field Championship	Big West Conference Outdoor track and field Championship	NCAA Division I Outdoor track and field Championship
2019		400 metres hurdles 1st place 58.02	
2019	pentathlon 6th place 4262 points	Heptathlon; 1st place 5814 points	Heptathlon; 4th place 5955 points
2019		4 × 400 m 5th place 3:46.01	
2019		Long jump 1st place 6.13 m (20 ft 1 1/4 in)	Long Jump; 24th place 5.73 m (18 ft 9 1/2 in)

== Prep and personal life ==
Hope Bender-Haugh was married in 2025.

Hope Bender competed for Newport Harbor High School alma mater.

While at Newport Beach, California Newport Harbor High School, she was a 2015 CIF CIF California State Meet finalist at 300 meters hurdles after competing in the 2015 CIF Southern Section track and field championships.

Bender won 100 meters hurdles at 2015 Mt. SAC Relays in 14.69.

Bender placed 2nd in the 100 m hurdles at 2015 Arcadia Invitational.

Hope Bender's best times were 200 m - 25.40 s, 400 m - 57.09 s, 100 m hurdles - 14.35 s, 300 m hurdles - 42.18 s, shot put - 10.25 m (33 ft 7 1/2 in), and long jump - 4.65 m (15 ft 3 in).

Bender competed in Motocross from 5–10 years old and Equestrian through 10th grade.
