= Michael Dickson (hurdler) =

American sprinter (born 1994)

Personal information
- Nationality: American
- Born: January 25, 1994 (age 32) Beaufort, South Carolina, U.S.
- Height: 6 ft 3 in (191 cm)

Sport
- Country: United States
- Sport: Running, track and field
- Event: Sprints
- College team: North Carolina A&T Aggies
- Turned pro: 2019
- Coached by: Duane Ross

Michael Dickson (born January 29, 1994) is an American professional track and field sprint hurdler who specializes in the 110 metres hurdles. While in college he competed for the North Carolina A&T Aggies where he was a two-Time All-American and 8 Time MEAC champion.

== Biography ==
=== Early life ===
Raised in Beaufort, South Carolina, Dickson attended Beaufort High School where he was a 3 time South Carolina 3A state champion; winning the 110 meter hurdles twice and a 1-time champion in the 200 meters.

=== Amateur career ===
In his freshman year at North Carolina A&T, Dickson won his first MEAC championship in the indoor 60-meter hurdles with a time of 7.85. He would qualify for the NCAA Indoor Championships, placing 10th at the event. In the 2016 outdoor season, he participated in 8 meets, including the Georgia Tech Invitational, where he broke, and then lowered, the school record in the 110 m hurdles. In the preliminaries, Dickson ran a 13.91, breaking the previous record of 14.13. Dickson would then best his own record in the semifinals, running a 13.89, before lowering it again in the finals, winning the event, with a time of 13.67.

In 2017, Dickson set a personal best in the 60m Hurdles, running at a time of 7.63 seconds. He would attempt to defend his MEAC Indoor championship in the 60 meter hurdles, however he placed 7th in the finals of the event. Dickson, would go on to qualify for NCAA championships, where he failed to get out of the preliminary rounds. During the outdoor season, Dickson would qualify for the NCAA East Preliminary Round in the 110m hurdles. At the event, he ran a time of 14.03, placing him outside of qualifying for the 2017 NCAA Championships.

In 2018, Dickson returned to the MEAC Indoor Championships, where he reclaimed the title in the 60-meter hurdles event. In the outdoor season, Dickson won the 110-meter hurdles event at the MEAC outdoor championships, where he ran a personal-best of 13.54. He would also run a personal best time of 20.83 in the 200-meter event, placing 7th in the finals. Dickson also ran on the 4 x 100 meter relay team that won the MEAC championship, giving A&T its 3rd consecutive championship in the event. Dickson would go on to qualify for the NCAA East regional competition in both the 100-meter hurdles and also the 4 x 100-meter relay events. At the event, he would not qualify for the NCAA Championships in the 110-meter hurdles but did qualify in the 4 x 100 relay. At the 2018 NCAA Championships, Dickson would compete in both the 4 x 100 and 4 x 400 relays. In the 4 x 400 relay, the A&T quartet would finish 4th in their heat, failing to advance to the finals. In the 4 x 100 relay, the Aggies would run a season-best 39.05 to qualify for the finals; however they would be disqualified in the finals.

In his senior season, Dickson would successfully defend his 60-meter hurdles championship from the previous year. Dickson would also compete in the 200 meters, where he would finish 6th overall. At the 2019 NCAA Indoor Championships, Dickson would qualify to run in the 60-meter hurdles, but failing to advance to the finals. During the outdoor season, he would qualify for the MEAC championship in the 100, 200 meters, 110-meter hurdles, and the 4 X 100-meter relay events. In the preliminary round of the 100 meters, Dickson ran a personal best time of 10.49, advancing him to the finals where he placed 6th. In the 200 meters, Dickson also ran a personal best of 20.50 in the preliminaries, advancing him to the finals where he finished 8th. In the 4 X 100-meter relay, Dickson, along with teammates Rodney Rowe, Malcolm Croom-McFadden, and Akeem Sirleaf won the MEAC championship with a time of 39.14. Lastly, in the 110-meter hurdles, Dickson ran a 13.82 to defend his conference title from the previous season. With this win, Dickson earned the second MEAC championship of his career in the event. At the NCAA Outdoor Championships, Dickson competed in the 110-meter Hurdles event where he placed 6th in the finals. Following the NCAA championships, Dickson qualified for the United States Championships in the same event. In the semifinals, he ran a personal best time of 13.47, then lowered it again to 13.45 in the finals, where his 5th-place finish set a new MEAC record and bring his collegiate career to a close.

=== Professional career ===
In September 2019, Dickson was named to represent the United States at The Match Europe v USA in Minsk, Belarus. At the competition, he finished 5th in the hurdles event with a time of 13.70. At the 2020 USA Track & Field Indoor Championships, Dickson competed in the 60-meter Hurdles event. In Heat 1, he finished 2nd with a time of 7.68 to qualify for the semifinals, where his 7.68 time was the 4th fasted qualifying time for the finals. In the finals, Dickson would finish in 6th place, with a time of 7.69.

== Statistics ==
Information from IAAF profile or Track & Field Results Reporting System unless otherwise noted.

=== Personal bests ===
Event	Time (sec)	Venue	Date	Note
100 metres	10.49	Greensboro, North Carolina, United States	May 3, 2019	+1.1 Wind
110 metre hurdles	13.45	Des Moines, Iowa, United States	July 28, 2019	−0.8 Wind
200 metres	20.80	Greensboro, North Carolina, United States	May 2, 2019	+1.2 wind
4 × 100 metres relay	38.59	Austin, Texas, United States	June 7, 2019	
4 × 400 metres relay	3:04.75	Greensboro, North Carolina, United States	May 4, 2018	
Indoor events
60 metres	6.84	Landover, Maryland, United States	February 12, 2016	
200 metres	21.43	Winston-Salem, North Carolina, United States	December 5, 2015	
60 metres hurdles	7.63	Winston-Salem, North Carolina, United States	December 4, 2017	

- All information taken from IAAF profile.

=== International championship results ===
Year	Competition	Venue	Position	Event	Time	Wind (m/s)	Notes
Representing the United States
2019	The Match Europe v USA	Minsk, Belarus	5th	110m Hurdles	13.70	+0.1	

=== National championship results ===
Year	Competition	Venue	Position	Event	Time	Wind (m/s)	Notes
Representing the North Carolina A&T Aggies
2016	NCAA Division I Indoor Championships	Birmingham, Alabama	10th	60m Hurdles	7.80	n/a	
2017	NCAA Division I Indoor Championships	College Station, Texas	DQ	60m Hurdles	—	n/a	
2018	NCAA Division I Outdoor Championships	Eugene, Oregon	DNF	4 X 100m Relay	—	n/a	Failed Exchange (Note: Dickson ran the 4 X 100 relay along with: Michael Bell, Joel Thomas & Rodney Rowe.)
2018	NCAA Division I Outdoor Championships	Eugene, Oregon	16th	4 X 400m Relay	3:07.02	n/a	
2019	NCAA Division I Indoor Championships	Birmingham, Alabama	8th	60m Hurdles	12.86	n/a	
2019	NCAA Division I Outdoor Championships	Austin, Texas	6th	13.71	n/a		
2019	USA Outdoor Championships	Des Moines, Iowa	5th	13.45	n/a		
Running Unattached
2020	USA Indoor Championships	Albuquerque, New Mexico	6th	60m Hurdles	7.69	n/a	
