= Teahna Daniels =

American sprinter (born 1997)

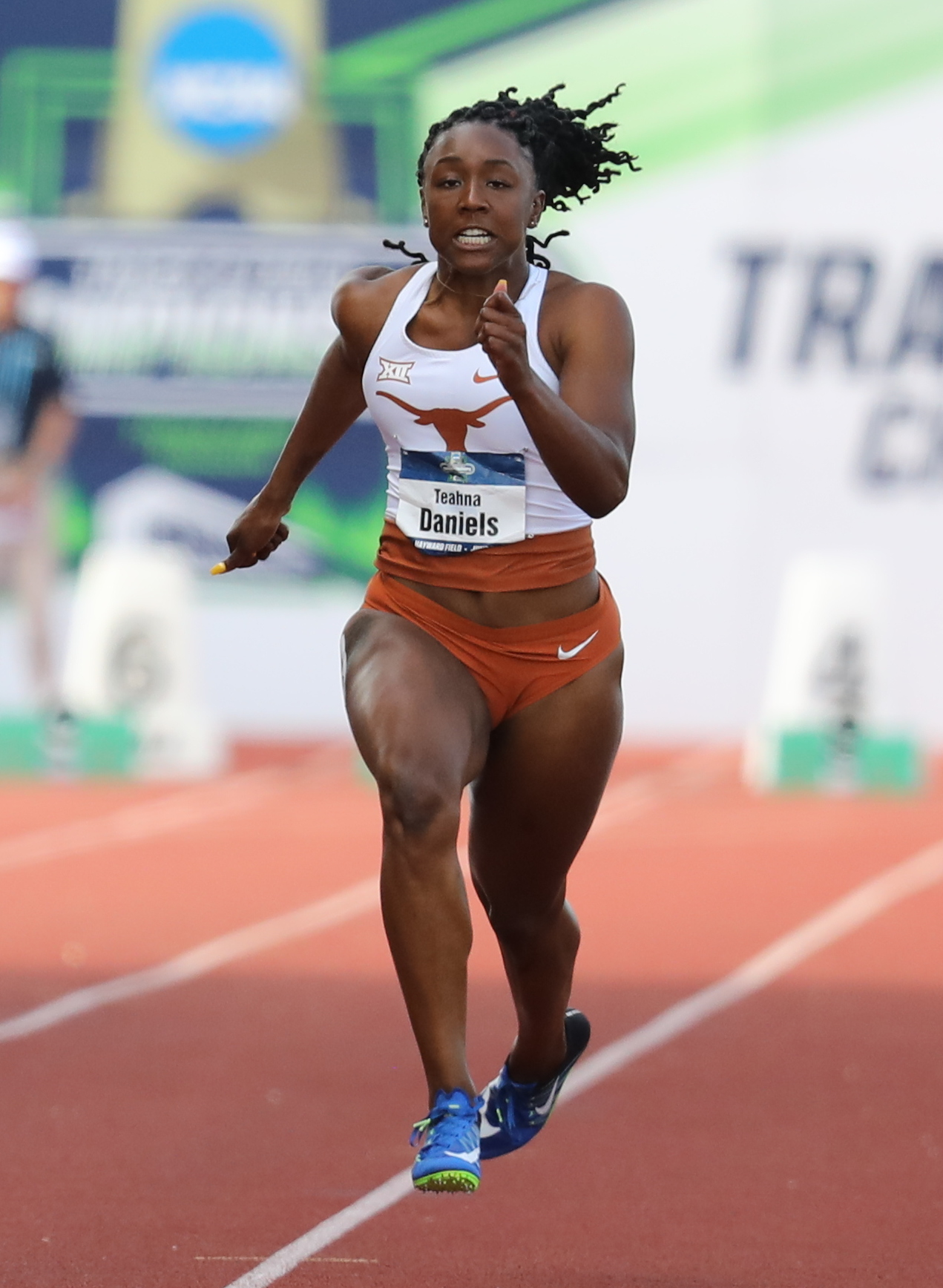
- Daniels at the 2018 NCAA Division I Championships

Personal information
- Nationality: American
- Born: March 25, 1997 (age 29) Orlando, Florida, United States
- Height: 5 ft 7 in (170 cm)

Sport
- Country: United States
- Sport: Track and field
- Event: Sprinting
- College team: Texas Longhorns (2016–2019)
- Turned pro: 2019
- Retired: 2023
Medal record
Women's athletics
Olympic Games
Silver medal – second place	2020 Tokyo	4×100 m relay
World Championships
Bronze medal – third place	2019 Doha	4×100 m relay
NACAC Championships
Gold medal – first place	2022 Bahamas	4×100 m relay
World Junior Championships
Gold medal – first place	2014 Eugene	4×100 m relay
Pan American Junior Championships
Gold medal – first place	2015 Edmonton	4×100 m relay
Bronze medal – third place	2015 Edmonton	100 m

Teahna Daniels (born March 25, 1997) is an American athlete competing in sprinting events. Representing the United States at the 2019 World Athletics Championships, she placed seventh in the women's 100 metres.

She led off the American 4 × 100 meters relay team at the 2014 World Junior Championships in Athletics and 2015 Pan American Junior Athletics Championships to win gold medals and also won an individual 100 m bronze medal at the Pan American Junior Championships.

Collegiately, she ran track for the Texas Longhorns and placed third in the 100 m at the 2017 NCAA Outdoor Championships and was a 100 m and 200 m finalist at the 2019 NCAA Outdoor Championships. She won the 100 m title at the 2019 NACAC U18 and U23 Championships in Athletics in July.

Daniels made her first national podium at the 2018 USA Track & Field Indoor Championships, taking third place in the 60-meter dash. She won her first national title at the 2019 USA Outdoor Track and Field Championships with a surprise victory in the 100 m over Olympic gold medallists English Gardner and Morolake Akinosun.

== Professional ==
Daniels became a certified yoga teacher in 2020 and she started to create designer clothes in 2021.

Year	Competition	Venue	Position	Event	Notes
Representing the United States
2014	World Junior Championships	Eugene, United States	1st	4 × 100 m relay	43.46
2015	Pan American Junior Championships	Edmonton, Canada	1st	4 × 100 m relay	43.79
2015	Pan American Junior Championships	Edmonton, Canada	3rd	100 m	43.79
2019	NACAC U23 Championships	Queretaro, Mexico	1st	100 m	11.03
2019	World Championships	Doha, Qatar	7th	100 m	11.19
2019	World Championships	Doha, Qatar	3rd	4 × 100 m relay	42.10
2021	Olympic Games	Tokyo, Japan	7th	100 m	11.02
2021	Olympic Games	Tokyo, Japan	2nd	4 × 100 m relay	41.45
2022	NACAC Championships	Freeport, Bahamas	1st	4 × 100 m relay	42.35

Daniels is a 4-time USA champion. She specializes in the 60 meters, 100 meters, 200 meters & 4×100 meters.

Year	Competition	Venue	Position	Event	Notes
Representing Nike
2023	2023 USA Outdoor Track and Field Championships	Eugene, Oregon	32nd	100 m	11.55
2022	2022 USA Outdoor Track and Field Championships	Eugene, Oregon	9th	100 m	10.96
2021	United States Olympic Trials	Eugene, Oregon	2nd	100 m	11.03
2019	USA Outdoor Track and Field Championships	Des Moines, Iowa	1st	100 m	11.20
2019	USA Outdoor Track and Field Championships	Des Moines, Iowa	4th	200 m	22.73
Representing University of Texas
2018	2018 USA Indoor Track and Field Championships	Albuquerque, New Mexico	3rd	60 m	7.22
2017	USA Outdoor Track and Field Championships	Sacramento, California	17th	100 m	11.18
2016	USATF U20 Outdoor Championships	Clovis, California	9th	100 m	11.61
Representing The First Academy
2015	USATF U20 Outdoor Championships	Eugene, Oregon	1st	100 m	11.24
2015	New Balance Indoor Nationals	New York, New York	1st	60 m	7.33
2014	USATF U20 Outdoor Championships	Eugene, Oregon	3rd	100 m	11.31
2014	USATF U20 Outdoor Championships	Eugene, Oregon	6th	200 m	24.00
2012	New Balance Nationals Outdoor	Greensboro, North Carolina	1st	200 m	24.28
2012	New Balance Nationals Outdoor	Greensboro, North Carolina	8th	100 m	12.05
2010	AAU Junior Olympic Games; Sub-Youth (U14) Girls	Hampton Roads, VA	4th	100 m	12.53
2010	AAU Junior Olympic Games; Sub-Youth (U14) Girls	Hampton Roads, VA	7th	200 m	
2010	AAU Junior Olympic Games; Sub-Youth (U14) Girls	Hampton Roads, VA	30th	200 m hurdles	30.77
2010	AAU Junior Olympic Games; Sub-Youth (U14) Girls	Hampton Roads, VA	8th	4 × 100 m relays	50.75

== NCAA ==
Teahna Daniels is a 2016 NCAA Division I 60 m Champion, 10-time NCAA All-American, and 7-time Big 12 individual event champion as a student-athlete at University of Texas at Austin.

2019 Big 12 Conference; Indoor track and field Championships	60 m	7.22	1st
2019 Big 12 Conference; Indoor track and field Championships	200 m	23.74	9th
2019 NCAA Division I Indoor track and field Championships	60 m	7.19	2nd
2019 Big 12 Conference; Outdoor track and field Championships	100 m	11.10	1st
2019 Big 12 Conference; Outdoor track and field Championships	200 m	22.71	1st
2019 Big 12 Conference; Outdoor track and field Championships	4 × 100 m relays	43.84	1st
2019 NCAA Division I Outdoor track and field Championships	100 m	11.00	4th
2019 NCAA Division I Outdoor track and field Championships	200 m	22.62	5th
2019 NCAA Division I Outdoor track and field Championships	4 × 100 m relays	43.69	8th

== National titles ==
- USA Outdoor Track and Field Championships
  - 100 m: 2019

== See also ==
- List of 100 metres national champions (women)
- United States at the 2019 World Athletics Championships
- The First Academy Alum
