= 2019 NCAA Division I Outdoor Track and Field Championships =

College track and field competition

- Edition: 98th (Men); 38th (Women)
- Dates: June 5–8, 2019
- Host city: Austin, Texas; University of Texas at Austin
- Venue: Mike A. Myers Stadium
- Events: 42

The 2019 NCAA Division I Outdoor Track and Field Championships was the 98th NCAA Division I Men's Outdoor Track and Field Championships and the 38th NCAA Division I Women's Outdoor Track and Field Championships held at Mike A. Myers Stadium in Austin, Texas on the campus of the University of Texas at Austin. In total, forty-two different men's and women's track and field events was contested from Wednesday, June 5 to Saturday, June 8, 2019.

== Schedule ==
WEDNESDAY, JUNE 5
TRACK EVENTS
TIME	EVENT	ROUND DIVISION
6:32 p.m.	4x100 Meter Relay	Semifinal Men
6:46 p.m.	1500 Meters	Semifinal Men
7:02 p.m.	3000 Meter Steeplechase	Semifinal Men
7:32 p.m.	110 Meter Hurdles	Semifinal Men
7:46 p.m.	100 Meters	Semifinal Men
8:00 p.m.	400 Meters	Semifinal Men
8:14 p.m.	800 Meters	Semifinal Men
8:30 p.m.	400 Meter Hurdles	Semifinal Men
8:44 p.m.	200 Meters	Semifinal Men
8:56 p.m.	400 Meters	Decathlon Men
9:08 p.m.	10,000 Meters	Final Men
9:48 p.m.	4x400 Meter Relay	Semifinal Men
FIELD EVENTS
TIME	EVENT	ROUND DIVISION
4:00 p.m.	Hammer Throw	Final Men
6:30 p.m.	Pole Vault	Final Men
6:45 p.m.	Javelin Throw	Final Men
8:00 p.m.	Long Jump	Final Men
8:40 p.m.	Shot Put	Final Men
COMBINED EVENTS
TIME	EVENT	ROUND DIVISION
2:30 p.m.	100 Meters	Decathlon Men
3:10 p.m.	Long Jump	Decathlon Men
4:25 p.m.	Shot Put	Decathlon Men
5:40 p.m.	High Jump	Decathlon Men
8:56 p.m.	400 Meters	Decathlon Men
THURSDAY, JUNE 6
TRACK EVENTS
TIME	EVENT	ROUND DIVISION
7:02 p.m.	4x100 Meter Relay	Semifinal Women
7:16 p.m.	1500 Meters	Semifinal Women
7:32 p.m.	3000 Meter Steeplechase	Semifinal Women
8:02 p.m.	100 Meter Hurdles	Semifinal Women
8:16 p.m.	100 Meters	Semifinal Women
8:30 p.m.	400 Meters	Semifinal Women
8:44 p.m.	800 Meters	Semifinal Women
9:00 p.m.	400 Meter Hurdles	Semifinal Women
9:14 p.m.	200 Meters	Semifinal Women
9:26 p.m.	1500 Meters	Decathlon Men
9:38 p.m.	10,000 Meters	Final Women
10:18 p.m.	4x400 Meter Relay	Semifinal Women
FIELD EVENTS
TIME	EVENT	ROUND DIVISION
4:30 p.m.	Hammer Throw	Final Women
7:30 p.m.	Pole Vault	Final Women
8:15 p.m.	Javelin Throw	Final Women
8:30 p.m.	Long Jump	Final Women
9:10 p.m.	Shot Put	Final Women
COMBINED EVENTS
TIME	EVENT	ROUND DIVISION
1:00 p.m.	110 Meter Hurdles	Decathlon Men
1:50 p.m.	Discus Throw	Decathlon Men
3:00 p.m.	Pole Vault	Decathlon Men
5:30 p.m.	Javelin Throw	Decathlon Men
9:26 p.m.	1500 Meters	Decathlon Men
FRIDAY, JUNE 7
TRACK EVENTS
TIME	EVENT	ROUND DIVISION
7:32 p.m.	4x100 Meter Relay	Final Men
7:41 p.m.	1500 Meters	Final Men
7:54 p.m.	3000 Meter Steeplechase	Final Men
8:12 p.m.	110 Meter Hurdles	Final Men
8:22 p.m.	100 Meters	Final Men
8:32 p.m.	400 Meters	Final Men
8:44 p.m.	800 Meters	Final Men
8:57 p.m.	400 Meter Hurdles	Final Men
9:07 p.m.	200 Meters	Final Men
9:13 p.m.	200 Meters	Heptathlon Women
9:25 p.m.	5000 Meters	Final Men
9:51 p.m.	4x400 Meter Relay	Final Men
FIELD EVENTS
TIME	EVENT	ROUND DIVISION
7:00 p.m.	High Jump	Final Men
7:05 p.m.	Discus Throw	Final Men
7:40 p.m.	Triple Jump	Final Men
COMBINED EVENTS
TIME	EVENT	ROUND DIVISION
2:30 p.m.	100 Meter Hurdles	Heptathlon Women
3:30 p.m.	High Jump	Heptathlon Women
5:30 p.m.	Shot Put	Heptathlon Women
9:13 p.m.	200 Meters	Heptathlon Women
SATURDAY, JUNE 8
TRACK EVENTS
TIME	EVENT	ROUND DIVISION
5:32 p.m.	4x100 Meter Relay	Final Women
5:41 p.m.	1500 Meters	Final Women
5:54 p.m.	3000 Meter Steeplechase	Final Women
6:12 p.m.	100 Meter Hurdles	Final Women
6:22 p.m.	100 Meters	Final Women
6:32 p.m.	400 Meters	Final Women
6:44 p.m.	800 Meters	Final Women
6:57 p.m.	400 Meter Hurdles	Final Women
7:07 p.m.	200 Meters	Final Women
7:13 p.m.	800 Meters	Heptathlon Women
7:25 p.m.	5000 Meters	Final Women
7:51 p.m.	4x400 Meter Relay	Final Women
FIELD EVENTS
TIME	EVENT	ROUND DIVISION
5:00 p.m.	High Jump	Final Women
5:05 p.m.	Discus Throw	Final Women
5:40 p.m.	Triple Jump	Final Women
COMBINED EVENTS
TIME	EVENT	ROUND DIVISION
1:30 p.m.	Long Jump	Heptathlon Women
2:45 p.m.	Javelin Throw	Heptathlon Women
7:13 p.m.	800 Meters	Heptathlon Women

== Results ==
=== Men's events ===
==== Men's 100 meters ====
Wind: +0.8 m/s

Rank	Name	University	Time	Notes
1st place, gold medalist(s)	(Nigeria) Divine Oduduru	Texas Tech	09.86	=WL
2nd place, silver medalist(s)	(United States) Cravon Gillespie	Oregon	09.93	
3rd place, bronze medalist(s)	(Japan) Hakim Sani Brown	Florida	09.97	NR
4	(Jamaica) Waseem Williams	Purdue	10.04	
5	(United States) Bryand Rincher	Florida State	10.06	
6	(Barbados) Mario Burke	Houston	10.06	
7	(United States) Devin Quinn	Illinois	10.12	
8	(Ghana) Joseph Amoah	Coppin State	10.22	

==== Men's 200 meters ====
Wind: +0.8 m/s

Rank	Name	Team	Time	Notes
1st place, gold medalist(s)	(Nigeria) Divine Oduduru	Texas Tech	19.73	CR
2nd place, silver medalist(s)	(United States) Cravon Gillespie	Oregon	19.93	
3rd place, bronze medalist(s)	(Japan) Hakim Sani Brown	Florida	20.08	
4	(Barbados) Mario Burke	Houston	20.11	
5	(United States) Micaiah Harris	Texas	20.13	
6	(Ghana) Joseph Amoah	Coppin State	20.19	
7	(United States) Andrew Hudson	Texas Tech	20.25	
8	(Jamaica) Mustaqeem Williams	Tennessee	20.56	

==== Men's 400 meters ====
Rank	Name	Team	Time	Notes
1st place, gold medalist(s)	(United States) Kahmari Montgomery	Houston	44.23	
2nd place, silver medalist(s)	(United States) Trevor Stewart	NC A&T	44.25	
3rd place, bronze medalist(s)	(United States) Wil London	Baylor	44.63	
4	(Barbados) Jonathan Jones	Texas	44.64	
5	(Colombia) Alejandro Zapata	Liberty	45.02	
6	(United States) Bryce Deadmon	Texas A&M	45.18	
7	(Jamaica) Chantz Sawyers	Florida	45.24	
-	(United States) Obi Igbokwe	Houston	DQ	

==== Men's 800 meters ====
Rank	Name	Team	Time	Notes
1st place, gold medalist(s)	(United States) Bryce Hoppel	Kansas	1:44.41	
2nd place, silver medalist(s)	(United States) Devin Dixon	Texas A&M	1:44.84	
3rd place, bronze medalist(s)	(Kenya) Festus Lagat	Iowa State	1:45.05	
4	(United States) Carlton Orange	Texas A&M	1:46.40	
5	(United States) Cooper Williams	Indiana	1:46.45	
6	(United States) Michael Rhoads	Air Force	1:46.58	
7	(Kenya) Jonah Koech	Texas Tech	1:47.28	
8	(United States) Vincent Crisp	Texas Tech	1:47.48	

==== Men's 1500 meters ====
Rank	Name	Team	Time	Notes
1st place, gold medalist(s)	(United States) Yared Nuguse	Notre Dame	3:41.39	
2nd place, silver medalist(s)	(Kenya) Justine Kiprotich	Michigan State	3:41.39	
3rd place, bronze medalist(s)	(Australia) Cameron Griffith	Arkansas	3:42.14	
4	(Australia) Oliver Hoare	Wisconsin	3:42.29	
5	(Canada) William Paulson	Arizona State	3:42.32	
6	(United States) Kasey Knevelbaard	Southern Utah	3:42.43	
7	(Australia) Jack Anstey	Illinois State	3:42.73	
8	(United States) Casey Comber	Villanova	3:42.77	
9	(United States) Sam Worley	Texas	3:42.81	
10	(United States) Mick Stanovsek	Washington	3:45.64	
11	(United States) Talem Franco	BYU	3:46.20	
12	(United States) Eduardo Herrera	Colorado	3:46.27	

==== Men's 5000 meters ====
Rank	Name	Team	Time	Notes
1st place, gold medalist(s)	(Australia) Morgan McDonald	Wisconsin	14:06.01	
2nd place, silver medalist(s)	(United States) Grant Fisher	Stanford	14:06.63	
3rd place, bronze medalist(s)	(United States) Thomas Ratcliffe	Stanford	14:07.92	
4	(Kenya) Gilbert Kigen	Alabama	14:08.12	
5	(Kenya) Edwin Kurgat	Iowa State	14:08.26	
6	(United States) Clayton Young	BYU	14:09.00	
7	(United States) Conner Mantz	BYU	14:09.20	
8	(United States) Kyle Mau	Indiana	14:09.62	
9	(United States) Robert Brandt	UCLA	14:10.19	
10	(New Zealand) Geordie Beamish	Northern Arizona	14:13.18	
11	(United States) Ian Shanklin	NC State	14:13.57	
12	(United States) Peter Seufer	Virginia Tech	14:13.91	
13	(United States) Morgan Beadlescomb	Michigan State	14:17.59	
14	(United States) John Dressel	Colorado	14:18.03	
15	(United States) Luis Grijalva	Northern Arizona	14:20.86	
16	(Kenya) Kigen Chemadi	Middle Tennessee	14:22.92	
17	(United States) Aaron Templeton	Furman	14:24.41	
18	(United States) Brodey Hasty	Northern Arizona	14:25.54	
19	(Kenya) Azaria Kirwa	Liberty	14:27.38	
20	(United States) Brian Zabilski	Columbia	14:29.13	
21	(United States) Zach Long	Tennessee	14:52.83	
22	(United States) Cooper Teare	Oregon	15:04.51	
23	(United States) Luke Landis	Ohio State	15:16.00	
-	(United States) Noah Perkins	North Florida	DNF	

==== Men's 10,000 meters ====
Rank	Name	Team	Time	Notes
1st place, gold medalist(s)	(United States) Clayton Young	BYU	29:16.60	
2nd place, silver medalist(s)	(Kenya) Gilbert Kigen	Alabama	29:18.10	
3rd place, bronze medalist(s)	(United States) Connor McMillan	BYU	29:19.85	
4	(United States) Conner Mantz	BYU	29:19.93	
5	(United States) Hassan Abdi	Oklahoma State	29:20.73	
6	(United States) Tyler Day	Northern Arizona	29:25.35	
7	(United States) Robert Brandt	UCLA	29:26.34	
8	(Kenya) Azaria Kirwa	Liberty	29:30.88	
9	(Kenya) Gilbert Boit	Arkansas	29:32.03	
10	(United States) John Dressell	Colorado	29:32.38	
11	(United States) Paul Hogan	UMass Lowell	29:42.60	
12	(Republic of Ireland) Ryan Forsyth	Colorado	29:47.90	
13	Nadeel Wildschutt	Coastal Carolina	29:54.12	
14	(United States) Brent Demarest	Virginia	29:54.20	
15	(Canada) Rory Linkletter	BYU	29:55.21	
16	(United States) Sean Burke	Boston College	30:01.13	
17	(United States) Frank Lara	Furman	30:09.94	
18	(United States) Ben Veatch	Indiana	30:14.93	
19	(South Africa) Adriaan Wildschutt	Coastal Carolina	30:52.04	
20	(Italy) Iliass Aouani	Syracuse	30:54.96	
21	(United States) Dallin Farnsworth	BYU	30:58.64	
22	(United States) Aaron Templeton	Furman	31:00.58	
23	(United States) Connor Weaver	BYU	31:11.05	
24	(Kenya) Lawrence Kipkoech	Campbell	31:20.16	

==== Men's 110-meter hurdles ====
Wind: +0.8 m/s

Rank	Name	Team	Time	Notes
1st place, gold medalist(s)	(United States) Grant Holloway	Florida	12.98	CR WL
2nd place, silver medalist(s)	(United States) Daniel Roberts	Kentucky	13.00	
3rd place, bronze medalist(s)	(United States) Isaiah Moore	South Carolina	13.37	
4	(United States) Dashaun Jackson	Saint Francis	13.38	
5	(United States) Caleb Parker	Southern Miss	13.55	
6	(United States) Michael Dickson	NC A&T	13.71	
7	(United States) Amere Lattin	Houston	13.77	
-	(United States) Eric Edwards Jr.	Oregon	DQ	

==== Men's 400-meter hurdles ====
Rank	Name	Team	Time	Notes
1st place, gold medalist(s)	(United States) Quincy Hall	South Carolina	48.48	
2nd place, silver medalist(s)	(United States) Norman Grimes	Texas Tech	48.71	
3rd place, bronze medalist(s)	(United States) Amere Lattin	Houston	48.72	
4	(United States) Taylor McLaughlin	Michigan	48.85	
5	(United States) James Smith	Arizona	49.72	
6	(United States) Cameron Samuel	USC	49.83	
7	(United States) Martice Moore	Louisville	50.14	
-	(United States) Robert Grant	Texas A&M	DQ	

==== Men's 3000-meter steeplechase ====
Rank	Name	Team	Time	Notes
1st place, gold medalist(s)	(United States) Steven Fahy	Stanford	8:38.46	
2nd place, silver medalist(s)	(Canada) Ryan Smeeton	Oklahoma State	8:39.10	
3rd place, bronze medalist(s)	(Kenya) Kigen Chemadi	Middle Tennessee	8:40.22	
4	(United States) Obsa Ali	Minnesota	8:40.36	
5	(United States) Bailey Roth	Arizona	8:40.92	
6	(United States) Alex Rogers	Texas	8:43.29	
7	(United States) Daniel Michalski	Indiana	8:43.48	
8	(United States) Matt Owens	BYU	8:45.40	
9	(United States) Nathan Mylenek	Iowa	8:49.40	
10	(United States) Clayson Shumway	BYU	8:53.45	
11	(United States) Kenneth Rooks	BYU	9:00.53	
12	(United States) Jacob Heslington	BYU	9:02.03	

==== Men's 4 x 100-meter relay ====
Rank	Team	Members	Time	Notes
1st place, gold medalist(s)	Florida	(Nigeria) Raymond Ekevwo, (Japan) Hakim Sani Brown, Grant Holloway, Ryan Clark	37.97	
2nd place, silver medalist(s)	Florida State	Bryand Rincher, (Jamaica) Jhevaughn Matherson, Michael Timpson, (Jamaica) Andre Ewers	38.08	
3rd place, bronze medalist(s)	Texas Tech	Keion Sutton, (Nigeria) Divine Oduduru, Andrew Hudson, Jacolby Shelton	38.45	
4	Arkansas	Josh Oglesby, (Denmark) Kristoffer Hari, Tre'Bien Gilbert, (United Kingdom) Roy Ejiakuekwu	38.58	
5	North Carolina A&T	Malcolm Croom-McFadden, (Liberia) Akeem Sirleaf, Michael Dickson, Rodney Rowe	38.59	
6	Oregon	Spenser Schmidt, Cravon Gillespie, Julius Shellmire, (Jamaica) Oraine Palmer	38.76	
7	Purdue	(The Bahamas) Tamar Greene, (The Bahamas) Samson Colebrooke, Justin Becker, (Jamaica) Waseem Williams	38.92	
-	LSU	Kary Vincent Jr., (Trinidad and Tobago) Akanni Hislop, Correion Mosby, Dorian Camel	DNF	

==== Men's 4 x 400-meter relay ====
Rank	Team	Members	Time	Notes
1st place, gold medalist(s)	Texas A&M	Bryce Deadmon, Robert Grant, Kyree Johnson, Devin Dixon	2:59.05	
2nd place, silver medalist(s)	Florida	(Denmark) Benjamin Lobo Vedel, (Jamaica) Chantz Sawyers, Denzel Villaman, Grant Holloway	2:59.60	
3rd place, bronze medalist(s)	Houston	Amere Lattin, Kahmari Montgomery, Jermaine Holt, Obi Igbokwe	3:00.07	
4	Iowa	Wayne Lawrence Jr., Antonio Woodard, (Jamaica) Karayme Bartley, Mar'yea Harris	3:00.14	
5	North Carolina A&T	(Jamaica) Akeem Lindo, (Liberia) Akeem Sirleaf, Trevor Stewart, Kemarni Mighty	3:01.50	
6	Baylor	Matthew Moorer, Chris Platt, Caleb Dickson, Wil London	3:03.32	
7	Arkansas	John Winn, Hunter Woodhall, Jalen Brown, Rhayko Schwartz	3:03.40	
8	South Carolina	(Guyana) Arinze Chance, Ty Jaye Robbins, Quincy Hall, Otis Jones	3:03.97	

==== Men's high jump ====
Rank	Athlete	Team	Height	Notes
1st place, gold medalist(s)	(United States) JuVaughn Harrison	LSU	2.27 m (7 ft 5 1/4 in)	
2nd place, silver medalist(s)	(India) Tejaswin Shankar	Kansas State	2.27 m (7 ft 5 1/4 in)	
3rd place, bronze medalist(s)	(United States) Shelby McEwen	Alabama	2.24 m (7 ft 4 in)	
4	(United States) Keenon Laine	Georgia	2.24 m (7 ft 4 in)	
5	(United States) Eric Richards	Southern Miss	2.24 m (7 ft 4 in)	
6	(United States) Sean Lee	UCLA	2.21 m (7 ft 3 in)	
7	(United States) Darius Carbin	Georgia	2.21 m (7 ft 3 in)	
7	(United States) Frank Harris	Southern Utah	2.21 m (7 ft 3 in)	
9	(Mexico) Roberto Vilches	Missouri	2.18 m (7 ft 1 3/4 in)	
9	(United States) Jhonny Victor	Florida	2.18 m (7 ft 1 3/4 in)	
9	(United States) Cody Stine	Ohio State	2.18 m (7 ft 1 3/4 in)	
12	(United States) Mayson Conner	Nebraska	2.18 m (7 ft 1 3/4 in)	
12	(United States) Earnie Sears	USC	2.18 m (7 ft 1 3/4 in)	
12	(United States) Justice Summerset	Arizona	2.18 m (7 ft 1 3/4 in)	
15	(United States) Rahman Minor	Kentucky	2.18 m (7 ft 1 3/4 in)	
16	(Australia) Brenton Foster	Virginia	2.18 m (7 ft 1 3/4 in)	
17	(United States) Zack Anderson	South Dakota	2.15 m (7 ft 1/2 in)	
17	(The Bahamas) Jyles Etienne	Indiana	2.15 m (7 ft 1/2 in)	
19	(United States) Mitch Jacobson	Washington State	2.15 m (7 ft 1/2 in)	
20	(United States) Jake Benninghoff	Texas Tech	2.10 m (6 ft 10 1/2 in)	
20	(United States) Curtis Richardson	Akron	2.10 m (6 ft 10 1/2 in)	
20	(United States) Jay Hunt	Iowa	2.10 m (6 ft 10 1/2 in)	
23	(United States) Peyton Fredrickson	Washington State	2.10 m (6 ft 10 1/2 in)	
24	(United States) Jacob Patten	Middle Tennessee	2.10 m (6 ft 10 1/2 in)	

==== Men's pole vault ====
Rank	Name	University	Height	Notes
1st place, gold medalist(s)	(United States) Chris Nilsen	South Dakota	5.95 m (19 ft 6 1/4 in)	
2nd place, silver medalist(s)	(Sweden) Mondo Duplantis	LSU	5.80 m (19 ft 1/4 in)	
3rd place, bronze medalist(s)	(United States) Clayton Fritsch	Sam Houston State	5.75 m (18 ft 10 1/4 in)	
4	(United States) KC Lightfoot	Baylor	5.70 m (18 ft 8 1/4 in)	
5	(United States) Michael Carr	Arkansas State	5.70 m (18 ft 8 1/4 in)	
6	(United States) Zach Bradford	Kansas	5.70 m (18 ft 8 1/4 in)	
7	(United States) Brandon Bray	Texas Tech	5.70 m (18 ft 8 1/4 in)	
8	(United States) Drew McMichael	Texas Tech	5.60 m (18 ft 4 1/4 in)	
9	(Norway) Sondre Guttormsen	UCLA	5.60 m (18 ft 4 1/4 in)	
10	(United States) Adam Coulon	Indiana	5.50 m (18 ft 1/2 in)	
11	(United States) Deakin Volz	Virginia Tech	5.50 m (18 ft 1/2 in)	
11	(United States) Branson Ellis	Stephen F Austin	5.50 m (18 ft 1/2 in)	
13	(United States) Matthew Ludwig	Akron	5.35 m (17 ft 6 1/2 in)	
13	(United States) Sean Clarke	Penn	5.35 m (17 ft 6 1/2 in)	
15	(United States) Christian Champen	Kent State	5.35 m (17 ft 6 1/2 in)	
15	(United States) Jacob Wooten	Texas A&M	5.35 m (17 ft 6 1/2 in)	
15	(United States) Chase Smith	Washington	5.35 m (17 ft 6 1/2 in)	
18	(United States) Cole Courtois	LA Tech	5.35 m (17 ft 6 1/2 in)	
19	(United States) Erick Duffy	Harvard	5.20 m (17 ft 1/2 in)	
19	(United States) Carl Johansson	Texas A&M	5.20 m (17 ft 1/2 in)	
21	(United States) Brock Mammoser	Indiana	5.20 m (17 ft 1/2 in)	
21	(United States) Matthew Peare	Kentucky	5.20 m (17 ft 1/2 in)	
-	(United States) Sean Collins	South Alabama	NH	
-	(United States) Matthew Keim	Akron	NH	

==== Men's long jump ====
Rank	Athlete	Team	Distance	Wind	Notes
1st place, gold medalist(s)	(United States) JuVaughn Harrison	LSU	8.20 m (26 ft 10 3/4 in)	+0.7	
2nd place, silver medalist(s)	(United States) Trumaine Jefferson	Houston	8.18 m (26 ft 10 in)	+1.6	
3rd place, bronze medalist(s)	(France) Yann Randrianasolo	South Carolina	8.12 m (26 ft 7 1/2 in)w	+2.3	
4	(United States) Justin Hall	Texas Tech	8.05 m (26 ft 4 3/4 in)	+0.7	
5	(United Kingdom) Jacob Fincham-Dukes	Oklahoma State	8.00 m (26 ft 2 3/4 in)	+2.0	
6	(United States) Jamie Brown	Alabama State	7.88 m (25 ft 10 in)	+1.8	
7	(United States) Kemonie Briggs	Long Beach St	7.87 m (25 ft 9 3/4 in)w	+2.1	
8	(United States) Jordan Latimer	Akron	7.83 m (25 ft 8 1/4 in)w	+3.2	
9	(Jamaica) Odaine Lewis	Texas Tech	7.78 m (25 ft 6 1/4 in)w	+2.1	
10	(United States) Steffin McCarter	Texas	7.76 m (25 ft 5 1/2 in)	+1.3	
11	(United States) Chris McBride	Clemson	7.73 m (25 ft 4 1/4 in)	+1.0	
12	(United States) Grant Holloway	Florida	7.72 m (25 ft 3 3/4 in)	+1.3	
13	(United States) Charles Brown	Texas Tech	7.70 m (25 ft 3 in)w	+3.1	
14	(United States) Carter Shell	Arkansas State	7.67 m (25 ft 1 3/4 in)w	+2.8	
15	(Brazil) Samory Fraga	Kent State	7.65 m (25 ft 1 in)w	+2.7	
16	(United States) R'Lazon Brumfield	Tennessee State	7.62 m (25 ft 0 in)	+1.6	
17	(United States) Allen Gordon	Ole Miss	7.61 m (24 ft 11 1/2 in)	+1.4	
18	(United States) Kenan Jones	LSU	7.54 m (24 ft 8 3/4 in)	+1.7	
19	(United States) Jullane Walker	Kansas State	7.44 m (24 ft 4 3/4 in)	+2.0	
20	(United States) Rayvon Grey	LSU	7.38 m (24 ft 2 1/2 in)	+1.6	
20	(United States) DaJuan Seward	Ohio State	7.38 m (24 ft 2 1/2 in)w	+2.6	
-	(United States) Keshun McGee	Eastern Washington	FOUL		
-	(United States) Jalen Seals	Baylor	DNS		
-	(United States) Derrick Monroe	Arizona State	DNS		

==== Men's triple jump ====
Rank	Athlete	Team	Distance	Wind	Notes
1st place, gold medalist(s)	(Zimbabwe) Chengetayi Mapaya	TCU	17.13 m (56 ft 2 1/4 in)	+1.1	
2nd place, silver medalist(s)	(Jamaica) Jordan Scott	Virginia	17.01 m (55 ft 9 1/2 in)	+1.0	
3rd place, bronze medalist(s)	(United States) Armani Wallace	Florida State	16.99 m (55 ft 8 3/4 in)	+1.1	
4	(United States) John Warren	Southern Miss	16.78 m (55 ft 1/2 in)	+1.2	
5	(Jamaica) O'Brien Wasome	Texas	16.71 m (54 ft 9 3/4 in)	+2.6	
6	(Jamaica) Odaine Lewis	Texas Tech	16.70 m (54 ft 9 1/4 in)	+1.4	
7	(United States) Eric Bethea	Indiana	16.65 m (54 ft 7 1/2 in)	+0.9	
8	(Finland) Tuomas Kaukolahti	California	16.50 m (54 ft 1 1/2 in)	+0.9	
9	(United States) Ade' Mason	Oklahoma	16.38 m (53 ft 8 3/4 in)	+1.2	
10	(United States) Treyvon Ferguson	Kansas	16.18 m (53 ft 1 in)	+2.0	
11	(United States) R'Lazon Brumfield	Tennessee State	16.14 m (52 ft 11 1/4 in)	+1.4	
12	(United States) Jah Strange	Purdue	16.03 m (52 ft 7 in)	+1.1	
13	(United States) Clayton Brown	Florida	15.99 m (52 ft 5 1/2 in)	+1.6	
14	(United States) Papay Glaywulu	Oklahoma	15.94 m (52 ft 3 1/2 in)	+0.8	
15	(United States) Christian Miller	LSU	15.94 m (52 ft 3 1/2 in)	+1.0	
16	(United States) Charles Brown	Texas Tech	15.87 m (52 ft 3/4 in)	+1.1	
17	(United States) Devon Willis	Albany	15.83 m (51 ft 11 in)	+1.4	
18	(United States) Keshun McGee	Eastern Washington	15.77 m (51 ft 8 3/4 in)	+1.1	
19	(United States) Tamar Greene	Purdue	15.64 m (51 ft 3 1/2 in)	+0.9	
20	(United States) Jaden Purnell	Oral Roberts	15.63 m (51 ft 3 1/4 in)	+1.0	
21	(United States) Rickey Fantroy	BYU	15.49 m (50 ft 9 3/4 in)	+1.1	
22	(United States) Georgi Nachev	Missouri	15.37 m (50 ft 5 in)	+1.1	
23	(United States) Jamar Davis	NC State	15.28 m (50 ft 1 1/2 in)	+0.6	
24	(United States) Daniel Igbokwe	Columbia	15.14 m (49 ft 8 in)	+1.1	

==== Men's shot put ====
Rank	Athlete	Team	Distance	Notes
1st place, gold medalist(s)	(United States) Adrian Piperi	Texas	21.11 m (69 ft 3 in)	
2nd place, silver medalist(s)	(Netherlands) Denzel Comenentia	Georgia	20.77 m (68 ft 1 1/2 in)	
3rd place, bronze medalist(s)	(United States) Jordan Geist	Arizona	20.31 m (66 ft 7 1/2 in)	
4	(United States) Payton Otterdahl	North Dakota State	19.89 m (65 ft 3 in)	
5	(United States) Dotun Ogundeji	UCLA	19.73 m (64 ft 8 3/4 in)	
6	(United States) Matthew Katnik	USC	19.65 m (64 ft 5 1/2 in)	
7	(United States) Nate Esparza	UCLA	19.65 m (64 ft 5 1/2 in)	
8	(United States) Andrew Liskowitz	Michigan	19.52 m (64 ft 1/2 in)	
9	(Canada) Joseph Maxwell	Tennessee	19.50 m (63 ft 11 1/2 in)	
10	(United States) Otito Ogbonnia	UCLA	19.44 m (63 ft 9 1/4 in)	
11	(United States) Connor Bandel	Florida	19.30 m (63 ft 3 3/4 in)	
12	(Nigeria) Oghenakpobo Efekoro	Virginia	19.16 m (62 ft 10 1/4 in)	
13	(United States) Corey Murphy	Monmouth	19.14 m (62 ft 9 1/2 in)	
14	(South Africa) Burger Lambrechts Jr.	Nebraska	18.91 m (62 ft 1/4 in)	
15	(Denmark) Kristoffer Thomsen	North Dakota State	18.90 m (62 ft 0 in)	
16	(United States) Jonah Wilson	Washington	18.82 m (61 ft 8 3/4 in)	
17	(United States) Kord Ferguson	Alabama	18.81 m (61 ft 8 1/2 in)	
18	(Republic of Ireland) Eric Favors	South Carolina	18.57 m (60 ft 11 in)	
19	(United States) Alex Talley	North Dakota State	18.49 m (60 ft 7 3/4 in)	
20	(United States) Isaiah Rogers	Virginia Tech	18.28 m (59 ft 11 1/2 in)	
21	(United States) Santiago Basso	Alabama	18.11 m (59 ft 4 3/4 in)	
22	(United States) Chance Ehrnsberger	Ohio State	17.98 m (58 ft 11 3/4 in)	
23	(United States) Darius King	No. Iowa	16.90 m (55 ft 5 1/4 in)	
-	(United States) Noah Castle	Kentucky	FOUL	

==== Men's discus throw ====
Rank	Athlete	Team	Mark	Notes
1st place, gold medalist(s)	(United States) Eric Kicinski	Texas Tech	62.53 m (205 ft 1 in)	
2nd place, silver medalist(s)	(United States) Payton Otterdahl	North Dakota State	62.48 m (204 ft 11 in)	
3rd place, bronze medalist(s)	(United States) Kord Ferguson	Alabama	62.07 m (203 ft 7 in)	
4	(United States) Dotun Ogundeji	UCLA	60.35 m (197 ft 11 in)	
5	(Netherlands) Denzel Comenentia	Georgia	59.97 m (196 ft 9 in)	
6	(United States) Samuel Welsh	Harvard	59.54 m (195 ft 4 in)	
7	(United States) Elijah Mason	Washington	58.29 m (191 ft 2 in)	
8	(United States) Brett Neelly	Kansas State	58.23 m (191 ft 0 in)	
9	(United States) Jerimiah Evans	Michigan State	57.85 m (189 ft 9 in)	
10	(United States) Nathan Dunivan	Weber State	57.75 m (189 ft 5 in)	
11	(United States) Ben Hammer	South Dakota	57.66 m (189 ft 2 in)	
12	(United Kingdom) Greg Thompson	Maryland	57.37 m (188 ft 2 in)	
13	(Jamaica) Roje Stona	Clemson	57.29 m (187 ft 11 in)	
14	(United States) Michael Renard	Army West Point	57.28 m (187 ft 11 in)	
15	(United States) Charles Lenford Jr.	Kentucky	56.86 m (186 ft 6 in)	
16	(United States) Carlos Davis	Nebraska	56.51 m (185 ft 4 in)	
17	(United States) Adam Dawson	Colorado State	55.16 m (180 ft 11 in)	
18	(United States) Iffy Joyner	California	55.16 m (180 ft 11 in)	
19	(United States) Noah Castle	Kentucky	54.63 m (179 ft 2 in)	
20	(United States) Jonah Wilson	Washington	54.50 m (178 ft 9 in)	
21	(United States) Grant Voeks	Clemson	54.25 m (177 ft 11 in)	
22	(Israel) Adar Shir	Memphis	53.30 m (174 ft 10 in)	
23	(United States) Khalil Davis	Nebraska	51.39 m (168 ft 7 in)	
24	(United States) Kelly Cook, Jr.	William & Mary	51.30 m (168 ft 3 in)	

==== Men's javelin throw ====
Rank	Name	Team	Distance	Notes
1st place, gold medalist(s)	(Grenada) Anderson Peters	Miss State	86.62 m (284 ft 2 in)	CR
2nd place, silver medalist(s)	(United States) Curtis Thompson	Miss State	78.43 m (257 ft 3 in)	
3rd place, bronze medalist(s)	(Trinidad and Tobago) Tyriq Horsford	Miss State	75.59 m (247 ft 11 in)	
4	(Iceland) Sindri Gudmundsson	Utah State	73.92 m (242 ft 6 in)	
5	(United States) Aaron True	Wichita State	73.11 m (239 ft 10 in)	
6	(United States) Sam Hardin	Texas A&M	73.05 m (239 ft 7 in)	
7	(United States) Ethan Dabbs	Virginia	72.23 m (236 ft 11 in)	
8	(United States) Denham Patricelli	Washington	70.98 m (232 ft 10 in)	
9	(United States) Chris Mirabelli	Rutgers	69.71 m (228 ft 8 in)	
10	(United States) John Nizich	Oregon	69.43 m (227 ft 9 in)	
11	(United States) William Petersson	Texas A&M	69.20 m (227 ft 0 in)	
12	(South Africa) Werner Bouwer	Texas Tech	69.19 m (227 ft 0 in)	
13	(United States) Mark Porter	Penn State	68.31 m (224 ft 1 in)	
14	(The Bahamas) Denzel Pratt	Liberty	67.40 m (221 ft 1 in)	
15	(United States) Trevor Danielson	Texas	66.84 m (219 ft 3 in)	
16	(United States) Skyler Porcaro	Southern Utah	66.68 m (218 ft 9 in)	
17	(United States) Marc Minichello	Penn	66.67 m (218 ft 8 in)	
18	(United States) Jackson Van Vuren	Oregon	66.00 m (216 ft 6 in)	
19	(United States) August Cook	Army West Point	65.82 m (215 ft 11 in)	
20	(United States) Hayden Fox	Navy	64.60 m (211 ft 11 in)	
21	(United States) Cade Antonucci	Auburn	63.89 m (209 ft 7 in)	
22	(Sweden) Simon Litzell	UCLA	63.41 m (208 ft 0 in)	
23	(United States) Elijah Marta	Kentucky	61.40 m (201 ft 5 in)	
24	(Canada) Brendan Artley	North Dakota State	59.57 m (195 ft 5 in)	

==== Men's hammer throw ====
Rank	Athlete	Team	Best mark	Notes
1st place, gold medalist(s)	(United States) Daniel Haugh	Kennesaw State	74.63 m (244 ft 10 in)	
2nd place, silver medalist(s)	(Belarus) Gleb Dudarev	Kansas	73.88 m (242 ft 4 in)	
3rd place, bronze medalist(s)	(Iceland) Hilmar Orn Jonsson	Virginia	73.31 m (240 ft 6 in)	
4	(Norway) Thomas Mardal	Florida	73.10 m (239 ft 9 in)	
5	(Netherlands) Denzel Comenentia	Georgia	72.93 m (239 ft 3 in)	
6	(United States) AJ McFarland	Florida	71.68 m (235 ft 2 in)	
7	(United States) Morgan Shigo	Penn State	70.75 m (232 ft 1 in)	
8	(United States) Joe Ellis	Michigan	69.26 m (227 ft 2 in)	
9	(United States) Silviu Bocancea	California	68.50 m (224 ft 8 in)	
10	(Spain) Kevin Arreaga	Miami	68.32 m (224 ft 1 in)	
11	(Sweden) Anders Eriksson	Florida	68.14 m (223 ft 6 in)	
12	(United States) Brock Eager	Washington State	67.69 m (222 ft 0 in)	
13	(Greece) Georgios Korakidis	Tennessee	67.65 m (221 ft 11 in)	
14	(United States) Kieran McKeag	Minnesota	67.60 m (221 ft 9 in)	
15	(United States) Justin Stafford	UCLA	67.05 m (219 ft 11 in)	
16	(United States) Bobby Colantonio	Alabama	66.47 m (218 ft 0 in)	
17	(United States) Vlad Pavlenko	Iowa State	66.39 m (217 ft 9 in)	
18	(United States) Nathan Bultman	USC	65.80 m (215 ft 10 in)	
19	(Greece) Alexios Prodanas	UMBC	65.66 m (215 ft 5 in)	
20	(United States) Erick Loomis	CSU Northridge	65.57 m (215 ft 1 in)	
21	(United States) Erich Sullins	Arkansas	65.47 m (214 ft 9 in)	
22	(United States) Alex Talley	North Dakota State	65.47 m (214 ft 9 in)	
23	(United States) Max Lydum	Oregon	61.26 m (200 ft 11 in)	
24	(United States) Logan Blomquist	SE Missouri	60.45 m (198 ft 3 in)	

==== Decathlon ====
Rank	Athlete	Team	Overall points	100 m	LJ	SP	HJ	400 m	110 m H	DT	PV	JT	1500 m
1st place, gold medalist(s)	(Estonia) Johannes Erm	Georgia	8352	000; 00.00	000; 0.00 m (0 in)	000; 00.00 m (0 in)	000; 0.00 m (0 in)	000; 00.00	000; 00.00	000; 00.00 m (0 in)	000; 0.00 m (0 in)	000; 00.00 m (0 in)	000; 0:00.00
2nd place, silver medalist(s)	(United States) Harrison Williams	Stanford	8010	000; 00.00	000; 0.00 m (0 in)	000; 00.00 m (0 in)	000; 0.00 m (0 in)	000; 00.00	000; 00.00	000; 00.00 m (0 in)	000; 0.00 m (0 in)	000; 00.00 m (0 in)	000; 0:00.00
3rd place, bronze medalist(s)	(United States) Gabe Moore	Arkansas	7780	000; 00.00	000; 0.00 m (0 in)	000; 00.00 m (0 in)	000; 0.00 m (0 in)	000; 00.00	000; 00.00	000; 00.00 m (0 in)	000; 0.00 m (0 in)	000; 00.00 m (0 in)	000; 0:00.00
4	(United States) Jack Lint	Michigan	7738	000; 00.00	000; 0.00 m (0 in)	000; 00.00 m (0 in)	000; 0.00 m (0 in)	000; 00.00	000; 00.00	000; 00.00 m (0 in)	000; 0.00 m (0 in)	000; 00.00 m (0 in)	000; 0:00.00
5	(Germany) Max Vollmer	Oregon	7703	000; 00.00	000; 0.00 m (0 in)	000; 00.00 m (0 in)	000; 0.00 m (0 in)	000; 00.00	000; 00.00	000; 00.00 m (0 in)	000; 0.00 m (0 in)	000; 00.00 m (0 in)	000; 0:00.00
6	(New Zealand) Aaron Booth	Kansas State	7680	000; 00.00	000; 0.00 m (0 in)	000; 00.00 m (0 in)	000; 0.00 m (0 in)	000; 00.00	000; 00.00	000; 00.00 m (0 in)	000; 0.00 m (0 in)	000; 00.00 m (0 in)	000; 0:00.00
7	(United States) Denim Rogers	Hou Baptist	7596	000; 00.00	000; 0.00 m (0 in)	000; 00.00 m (0 in)	000; 0.00 m (0 in)	000; 00.00	000; 00.00	000; 00.00 m (0 in)	000; 0.00 m (0 in)	000; 00.00 m (0 in)	000; 0:00.00
8	(United States) Trent Nytes	Wisconsin	7516	000; 00.00	000; 0.00 m (0 in)	000; 00.00 m (0 in)	000; 0.00 m (0 in)	000; 00.00	000; 00.00	000; 00.00 m (0 in)	000; 0.00 m (0 in)	000; 00.00 m (0 in)	000; 0:00.00
9	(United States) Benjamin Ose	Dartmouth	7445	000; 00.00	000; 0.00 m (0 in)	000; 00.00 m (0 in)	000; 0.00 m (0 in)	000; 00.00	000; 00.00	000; 00.00 m (0 in)	000; 0.00 m (0 in)	000; 00.00 m (0 in)	000; 0:00.00
10	(United States) Isaiah Martin	Purdue	7398	000; 00.00	000; 0.00 m (0 in)	000; 00.00 m (0 in)	000; 0.00 m (0 in)	000; 00.00	000; 00.00	000; 00.00 m (0 in)	000; 0.00 m (0 in)	000; 00.00 m (0 in)	000; 0:00.00
11	(United States) Brian Matthews	BYU	7394	000; 00.00	000; 0.00 m (0 in)	000; 00.00 m (0 in)	000; 0.00 m (0 in)	000; 00.00	000; 00.00	000; 00.00 m (0 in)	000; 0.00 m (0 in)	000; 00.00 m (0 in)	000; 0:00.00
12	(United States) Charlie Card-Childers	Rice	7365	000; 00.00	000; 0.00 m (0 in)	000; 00.00 m (0 in)	000; 0.00 m (0 in)	000; 00.00	000; 00.00	000; 00.00 m (0 in)	000; 0.00 m (0 in)	000; 00.00 m (0 in)	000; 0:00.00
13	(United States) Nathan Hite	Texas A&M	7348	000; 00.00	000; 0.00 m (0 in)	000; 00.00 m (0 in)	000; 0.00 m (0 in)	000; 00.00	000; 00.00	000; 00.00 m (0 in)	000; 0.00 m (0 in)	000; 00.00 m (0 in)	000; 0:00.00
14	(United States) Ben Johnson	Wichita State	7329	000; 00.00	000; 0.00 m (0 in)	000; 00.00 m (0 in)	000; 0.00 m (0 in)	000; 00.00	000; 00.00	000; 00.00 m (0 in)	000; 0.00 m (0 in)	000; 00.00 m (0 in)	000; 0:00.00
15	(United States) Wade Walder	Butler	7090	000; 00.00	000; 0.00 m (0 in)	000; 00.00 m (0 in)	000; 0.00 m (0 in)	000; 00.00	000; 00.00	000; 00.00 m (0 in)	000; 0.00 m (0 in)	000; 00.00 m (0 in)	000; 0:00.00

=== Women's events ===
==== Women's 100 meters ====
Wind: +1.6 m/s

Rank	Name	Team	Time	Notes
1st place, gold medalist(s)	(United States) Sha'Carri Richardson	LSU	10.75	CR
2nd place, silver medalist(s)	(United States) Kayla White	NC A&T	10.95	
3rd place, bronze medalist(s)	(United States) Twanisha Terry	USC	10.98	
4	(United States) Teahna Daniels	Texas	11.00	
5	(United States) Kiara Parker	Arkansas	11.02	
6	(Jamaica) Kiara Grant	Norfolk State	11.04	
7	(United States) Anglerne Annelus	USC	11.12	
8	(United States) Ka'Tia Seymour	Florida State	11.65	

==== Women's 200 meters ====
Wind: +1.3 m/s

Rank	Name	Team	Time	Notes
1st place, gold medalist(s)	(United States) Anglerne Annelus	USC	22.16	
2nd place, silver medalist(s)	(United States) Sha'Carri Richardson	LSU	22.17	
3rd place, bronze medalist(s)	(United States) Cambrea Sturgis	NC A&T	22.40	
4	(Jamaica) Janeek Brown	Arkansas	22.40	
5	(United States) Teahna Daniels	Texas	22.62	
6	(United States) Lanae-Tava Thomas	USC	22.74	
7	(United States) Kayla White	NC A&T	22.81	
-	(United States) Ka'Tia Seymour	Florida State	DNS	

==== Women's 400 meters ====
Rank	Name	Team	Time	Notes
1st place, gold medalist(s)	(United States) Wadeline Jonathas	South Carolina	50.60	
2nd place, silver medalist(s)	(United States) Chloe Abbott	Kentucky	50.98	
3rd place, bronze medalist(s)	(United States) Sharrika Barnett	Florida	51.00	
4	(United States) Kethlin Campbell	Arkansas	51.09	
5	(Guyana) Aliyah Abrams	South Carolina	51.13	
6	(Canada) Kyra Constantine	USC	51.47	
7	(United States) Syaira Richardson	Texas A&M	51.98	
8	(United States) Hannah Waller	Oregon	52.47	

==== Women's 800 meters ====
Rank	Name	Team	Time	Notes
1st place, gold medalist(s)	(Jamaica) Jazmine Fray	Texas A&M	2:01.31	
2nd place, silver medalist(s)	(United States) Nia Akins	Penn	2:01.67	
3rd place, bronze medalist(s)	(United States) Avi' Tal Wilson-Perteete	UNLV	2:02.20	
4	(Kenya) Susan Ejore	Oregon	2:02.26	
5	(United States) Allie Wilson	Monmouth	2:02.56	
6	(United States) Kristie Schoffield	Boise State	2:03.86	
7	(United States) Ersula Farrow	LSU	2:04.80	
8	(United States) Anna Camp	BYU	2:05.93	

==== Women's 1500 meters ====
Rank	Name	University	Time	Notes
1st place, gold medalist(s)	(United States) Sinclaire Johnson	Oklahoma State	4:05.98	CR
2nd place, silver medalist(s)	(Australia) Jessica Hull	Oregon	4:06.27	
3rd place, bronze medalist(s)	(United States) Jessica Harris	Notre Dame	4:11.96	
4	(United States) Lotte Black	Rhode Island	4:13.02	
5	(United States) Dillon McClintock	Michigan State	4:13.57	
6	(United States) Ella Donaghu	Stanford	4:13.62	
7	(United States) Jenny Celis	Oklahoma State	4:14.30	
8	(United States) Whittni Orton	BYU	4:14.73	
9	(United States) Taryn Rawlings	Portland	4:15.03	
10	(United States) Jessica Lawson	Stanford	4:16.04	
11	(United States) Molly Sughroue	Oklahoma State	4:18.06	
12	(United States) Julia Rizk	Ohio State	4:19.31	

==== Women's 5000 meters ====
Rank	Name	Team	Time	Notes
1st place, gold medalist(s)	(United States) Dani Jones	Colorado	15:50.65	
2nd place, silver medalist(s)	(United States) Taylor Werner	Arkansas	15:51.24	
3rd place, bronze medalist(s)	(Kenya) Esther Gitahi	Alabama	15:51.85	
4	(United States) Josette Norris	Georgetown	15:52.05	
5	(Eritrea) Weini Kelati	New Mexico	15:54.46	
6	(United States) Makena Morley	Colorado	16:02.89	
7	(United States) Fiona O'Keeffe	Stanford	16:07.84	
8	(United States) Hannah Steelman	Wofford	16:14.58	
9	(Australia) Jessica Pascoe	Florida	16:17.82	
10	(United States) Bethany Hasz	Minnesota	16:18.13	
11	(United States) Caroline Alcorta	Villanova	16:18.66	
12	(United States) Alexandra Hays	Columbia	16:19.45	
13	(United States) Jaci Smith	Air Force	16:22.42	
14	(United States) Abbey Wheeler	Providence	16:23.42	
15	(Canada) Charlotte Prouse	New Mexico	16:26.57	
16	(United States) Allie Ostrander	Boise State	16:28.19	
17	(United States) Abby Nichols	Ohio State	16:37.45	
18	(United States) Angie Nickerson	Southern Utah	16:38.08	
19	(United States) Jessica Drop	Georgia	16:40.84	
20	(United States) Rachel DaDamio	Notre Dame	16:43.69	
21	(Kenya) Joyce Kimeli	Auburn	17:02.91	
22	(United Kingdom) Julia Paternain	Penn State	17:13.82	
-	(United States) Devin Clark	Arkansas	DNF	
-	(Israel) Adva Cohen	New Mexico	DNF	

==== Women's 10,000 meters ====
Rank	Name	Team	Time	Notes
1st place, gold medalist(s)	(Eritrea) Weini Kelati	New Mexico	33:10.84	
2nd place, silver medalist(s)	(Spain) Carmela Cardama Baez	Oregon	33:11.56	
3rd place, bronze medalist(s)	(Australia) Isobel Batt-Doyle	Washington	33:17.81	
4	(United States) Taylor Werner	Arkansas	33:20.68	
5	(United States) Caroline Alcorta	Villanova	33:20.70	
6	(United States) Anna Rohrer	Notre Dame	33:25.91	
7	(United States) Paige Stoner	Syracuse	33:32.80	
8	(United States) Amy Davis	Wisconsin	33:34.20	
9	(Kenya) Ednah Kurgat	New Mexico	33:34.67	
10	(United States) Abbie McNulty	Stanford	33:38.55	
11	(United States) Makena Morley	Colorado	33:39.27	
12	(United States) Erin Finn	Michigan	33:40.88	
13	(Poland) Weronika Pyzik	Oregon	34:00.66	
14	(United States) Amanda Vestri	Iowa State	34:02.78	
15	(Canada) Laura Dickinson	Syracuse	34:03.76	
16	(United States) Kaitlyn Benner	Colorado	34:06.39	
17	(United States) Margaret Allen	Indiana	34:16.09	
18	(Bulgaria) Militsa Mircheva	Florida State	34:29.41	
19	(United States) Maddy Denner	Notre Dame	34:58.38	
20	(United States) Megan Hasz	Minnesota	35:03.50	
21	(United States) Monica Hebner	Duke	35:28.28	
22	(Kenya) Ivine Chemutai	Louisville	35:35.93	
-	(United States) Samantha Halvorsen	Wake Forest	DNF	
-	(United States) Jacqueline Gaughan	Notre Dame	DNF	

==== Women's 100-meter hurdles ====
Wind: +0.6 m/s

Rank	Name	Team	Time	Notes
1st place, gold medalist(s)	(Jamaica) Janeek Brown	Arkansas	12.40	
2nd place, silver medalist(s)	(United States) Chanel Brissett	USC	12.52	
3rd place, bronze medalist(s)	(United States) Tonea Marshall	LSU	12.66	
4	(Jamaica) Jeanine Williams	GA Tech	12.74	
5	(United States) Anna Cockrell	USC	12.80	
6	(United States) Cortney Jones	Florida State	12.81	
7	(United States) Tiara McMinn	Miami	12.97	
8	(United States) Payton Chadwick	Arkansas	13.05	

==== Women's 400-meter hurdles ====
Rank	Name	Team	Time	Notes
1st place, gold medalist(s)	(United States) Anna Cockrell	USC	55.23	
2nd place, silver medalist(s)	(Puerto Rico) Gabby Scott	Colorado	56.04	
3rd place, bronze medalist(s)	(United States) Brittley Humphrey	LSU	56.11	
4	(Saint Kitts and Nevis) Reanda Richards	Rutgers	56.42	
5	(United States) Brenna Porter	BYU	57.26	
6	(United States) Jurnee Woodward	LSU	57.48	
7	(United States) Darhian Mills	Washington	57.76	
8	(United States) Samantha Gonzalez	Miami	58.43	

==== Women's 3000-meter steeplechase ====
Rank	Name	University	Time	Notes
1st place, gold medalist(s)	(United States) Allie Ostrander	Boise State	9:37.73	PR
2nd place, silver medalist(s)	(Canada) Charlotte Prouse	New Mexico	9:44.50	PR
3rd place, bronze medalist(s)	(United States) Hannah Steelman	Wofford	9:46.08	PR
4	(Israel) Adva Cohen	New Mexico	9:46.36	
5	(United States) Erica Birk	BYU	9:46.47	
6	(United States) Val Constien	Colorado	9:51.22	
7	(United States) Devin Clark	Arkansas	9:55.22	
8	(United States) Rebekah Topham	Wichita State	9:57.80	
9	(United States) Gabrielle Jennings	Furman	9:58.83	
10	(Australia) Brianna Ilarda	Providence	10:11.63	
11	(United States) Alissa Niggemann	Wisconsin	10:25.60	
12	(United States) Nell Crosby	NC State	10:35.47	

==== Women's 4 x 100-meter relay ====
Rank	Team	Members	Time	Notes
1st place, gold medalist(s)	USC	Chanel Brissett, Anglerne Annelus, Lanae-Tava Thomas, Twanisha Terry	42.21	
2nd place, silver medalist(s)	LSU	Tonea Marshall, Kortnei Johnson, Rachel Misher, Sha'Carri Richardson	42.29	
3rd place, bronze medalist(s)	Arkansas	Tamara Kuykendall, Payton Chadwick, (Jamaica) Janeek Brown, Kiara Parker	42.79	
4	Oregon	Kerissa D'Arpino, Venessa D'Arpino, Briyahna DesRosiers, Brianna Duncan	42.99	
5	Alabama	Daija Lampkin, (Trinidad and Tobago) Mauricia Prieto, Symone Darius, Tamara Clark	43.00	
6	North Carolina A&T	Cambrea Sturgis, Kayla White, Tori Ray, Kamaya Debose-Epps	43.09	
7	Florida State	Karimah Davis, Jayla Kirkland, (Jamaica) Shauna Helps, Ka'Tia Seymour	43.13	
8	Texas	Kennedy Simon, Teahna Daniels, Zola Golden, Serenity Douglas	43.69	

==== Women's 4 x 400-meter relay ====
Rank	Team	Members	Time	Notes
1st place, gold medalist(s)	Texas A&M	Tierra Robinson-Jones, Jaevin Reed, (Jamaica) Jazmine Fray, Syaira Richardson	3:25.57	
2nd place, silver medalist(s)	Arkansas	Paris Peoples, Kiara Parker, Payton Chadwick, Kethlin Campbell	3:25.89	
3rd place, bronze medalist(s)	South Carolina	Stephanie Davis, (Guyana) Aliyah Abrams, (Jamaica) Tatyana Mills, Wadeline Jonathas	3:26.90	
4	Florida	(The Bahamas) Doneisha Anderson, Taylor Manson, Nikki Stephens, Sharrika Barnett	3:27.02	
5	Alabama	Takyera Roberson, Katie Funcheon, (Trinidad and Tobago) Mauricia Prieto, (Canada) Natassha McDonald	3:27.12	
6	Kentucky	Faith Ross, Abby Steiner, Masai Russell, Chloe Abbott	3:29.13	
7	Baylor	Aaliyah Miller, Kiana Horton, Sydney Washington, (Brazil) Leticia De Souza	3:32.37	
8	USC	Bailey Lear, (Canada) Kyra Constantine, Anna Cockrell, Kaelin Roberts	3:35.55	

==== Women's high jump ====
Rank	Athlete	Team	Height	Notes
1st place, gold medalist(s)	(United States) Zarriea Willis	Texas Tech	1.87 m (6 ft 1 1/2 in)	jump off 1.88 m (6 ft 2 in)
2nd place, silver medalist(s)	(United States) Nicole Greene	North Carolina	1.87 m (6 ft 1 1/2 in)	
3rd place, bronze medalist(s)	(United States) Anna Peyton Malizia	Penn	1.84 m (6 ft 1/4 in)	
4	(Ghana) Abigail Kwarteng	Alabama	1.81 m (5 ft 11 1/4 in)	
5	(Mexico) Karla Teran	Arizona	1.81 m (5 ft 11 1/4 in)	
6	(United States) Sanaa Barnes	Villanova	1.81 m (5 ft 11 1/4 in)	
6	(Sweden) Ellen Ekholm	Kentucky	1.81 m (5 ft 11 1/4 in)	
8	(United States) Stacey Destin	Alabama	1.81 m (5 ft 11 1/4 in)	
9	(United States) Andrea Stapleton-Johnson	BYU	1.78 m (5 ft 10 in)	
10	(United States) Ann Wingeleth	Oregon State	1.78 m (5 ft 10 in)	
11	(United States) Iesha Hamm	CSU Fullerton	1.78 m (5 ft 10 in)	
12	(United States) Kameesha Smith	Illinois State	1.78 m (5 ft 10 in)	
12	(United States) Rachel Reichenbach	Stanford	1.78 m (5 ft 10 in)	
12	(United States) Alexus Henry	UT-Arlington	1.78 m (5 ft 10 in)	
12	(United States) Logan Boss	Miss State	1.78 m (5 ft 10 in)	
16	(Germany) Nicola Ader	Nevada	1.75 m (5 ft 8 3/4 in)	
16	(Jamaica) Sashane Hanson	TAMU-CC	1.75 m (5 ft 8 3/4 in)	
16	(Trinidad and Tobago) Tyra Gittens	Texas A&M	1.75 m (5 ft 8 3/4 in)	
19	(United States) Bria Palmer	Long Beach St	1.75 m (5 ft 8 3/4 in)	
19	(United States) Skyler Daniel	Auburn	1.75 m (5 ft 8 3/4 in)	
21	(United States) Jada Harris	UMass Amherst	1.70 m (5 ft 6 3/4 in)	
21	(Bermuda) Sakari Famous	Georgia	1.70 m (5 ft 6 3/4 in)	
21	(United States) Clarissa Cutliff	FIU	1.70 m (5 ft 6 3/4 in)	
24	(Canada) Mikella Lefebvre-Oatis	Maryland	1.70 m (5 ft 6 3/4 in)	

==== Women's pole vault ====
Rank	Name	University	Height	Notes
1st place, gold medalist(s)	(United States) Victoria Hoggard	Arkansas	4.56 m (14 ft 11 1/2 in)	
2nd place, silver medalist(s)	(United States) Bonnie Draxler	San Diego St	4.51 m (14 ft 9 1/2 in)	
3rd place, bronze medalist(s)	(United States) Olivia Gruver	Washington	4.45 m (14 ft 7 in)	
4	(United States) Bridget Guy	Virginia	4.45 m (14 ft 7 in)	
5	(United Kingdom) Lucy Bryan	Akron	4.35 m (14 ft 3 1/4 in)	
6	(United States) Meagan Gray	Oklahoma	4.35 m (14 ft 3 1/4 in)	
7	(Italy) Helen Falda	South Dakota	4.35 m (14 ft 3 1/4 in)	
8	(United States) Kristen Denk	Vanderbilt	4.35 m (14 ft 3 1/4 in)	
9	(United States) Elleyse Garrett	UCLA	4.20 m (13 ft 9 1/4 in)	
9	(United States) Desiree Freier	Arkansas	4.20 m (13 ft 9 1/4 in)	
9	(United States) Madison Pecot	Stephen F Austin	4.20 m (13 ft 9 1/4 in)	
9	(United States) Alexis Jacobus	Arkansas	4.20 m (13 ft 9 1/4 in)	
9	(United States) Maddie Gardner	West Virginia	4.20 m (13 ft 9 1/4 in)	
14	(United States) Reagan Darbonne	Northwestern State	4.20 m (13 ft 9 1/4 in)	
14	(United States) Rebekah Markel	Tulane	4.20 m (13 ft 9 1/4 in)	
16	(United States) Lindsey Murray	Ole Miss	4.20 m (13 ft 9 1/4 in)	
16	(United States) Chinne Okoronkwo	Texas Tech	4.20 m (13 ft 9 1/4 in)	
16	(United States) Nastassja Campbell	Stephen F Austin	4.20 m (13 ft 9 1/4 in)	
19	(United States) Gabriela Leon	Louisville	4.05 m (13 ft 3 1/4 in)	
19	(United States) Kayla Smith	Georgia	4.05 m (13 ft 3 1/4 in)	
19	(United States) Nati Sheppard	Duke	4.05 m (13 ft 3 1/4 in)	
22	(United States) Hannah Jefcoat	Tennessee	4.05 m (13 ft 3 1/4 in)	
23	(United States) Kaitlyn Merritt	Stanford	4.05 m (13 ft 3 1/4 in)	
-	(United States) Sara McKeeman	Ohio State	NH	

==== Women's long jump ====
Rank	Athlete	Team	Distance	Wind	Notes
1st place, gold medalist(s)	(France) Yanis David	Florida	6.84 m (22 ft 5 1/4 in)	+1.5	
2nd place, silver medalist(s)	(United States) Jasmyn Steels	Northwestern State	6.71 m (22 ft 0 in)	+0.5	
3rd place, bronze medalist(s)	(Ghana) Deborah Acquah	Texas A&M	6.63 m (21 ft 9 in)	+0.6	
4	(United States) Destiny Longmire	TCU	6.55 m (21 ft 5 3/4 in)	+0.9	
5	(France) Rougui Sow	Florida State	6.49 m (21 ft 3 1/2 in)	+0.8	
6	(United States) Sarea Alexander	Incarnate Word	6.44 m (21 ft 1 1/2 in)	+0.7	
7	(United States) Rhesa Foster	Oregon	6.43 m (21 ft 1 in)	+1.2	
8	(United States) Aliyah Whisby	Georgia	6.40 m (20 ft 11 3/4 in)	+0.6	
9	(Lithuania) Jogaile Petrokaite	Florida State	6.39 m (20 ft 11 1/2 in)	+1.1	
10	(United States) Kiara Williams	Alabama	6.23 m (20 ft 5 1/4 in)	+0.4	
11	(United States) Samiyah Samuels	Houston	6.21 m (20 ft 4 1/4 in)	+0.9	
12	(Germany) Nicola Ader	Nevada	6.21 m (20 ft 4 1/4 in)	+0.6	
13	(United States) Jewel Smith	Maryland	6.21 m (20 ft 4 1/4 in)	+0.8	
14	(United States) Nadia Williams	Central Michigan	6.19 m (20 ft 3 1/2 in)	+0.8	
15	(United States) G'Auna Edwards	Arkansas	6.18 m (20 ft 3 1/4 in)	+1.1	
16	(United States) Tanalaya Gordon	Memphis	6.08 m (19 ft 11 1/4 in)	+1.0	
17	(Hungary) Eszter Bajnok	Virginia Tech	6.03 m (19 ft 9 1/4 in)	+1.1	
18	(United States) Monae' Nichols	Bethune-Cookman	6.03 m (19 ft 9 1/4 in)	+0.9	
19	(United States) Sophia Falco	Texas	6.02 m (19 ft 9 in)	+1.3	
20	(Jamaica) Annastacia Forrester	Western Kentucky	5.98 m (19 ft 7 1/4 in)	+0.8	
21	(United States) Shylia Riley	Nebraska	5.97 m (19 ft 7 in)	+0.8	
22	(United States) Margaux Jones	USC	5.97 m (19 ft 7 in)	+0.9	
23	(United States) Jerayah Davis	Wyoming	5.95 m (19 ft 6 1/4 in)	+1.0	
24	(United States) Hope Bender	UC Santa Barbara	5.73 m (18 ft 9 1/2 in)	+0.9	

==== Women's triple jump ====
Rank	Athlete	Team	Distance	Wind	Notes
1st place, gold medalist(s)	(Jamaica) Shardia Lawrence	Kansas State	13.99 m (45 ft 10 3/4 in)	+0.2	
2nd place, silver medalist(s)	(France) Yanis David	Florida	13.93 m (45 ft 8 1/4 in)	−0.2	
3rd place, bronze medalist(s)	(France) Marie-Josee Ebwea-Excel	Kentucky	13.87 m (45 ft 6 in)	+0.5	
4	(United States) Chaquinn Cook	Oregon	13.72 m (45 ft 0 in)	+0.8	
5	(United States) Kelly McKee	Virginia	13.51 m (44 ft 3 3/4 in)	−0.2	
6	(Brazil) Mirieli Santos	Missouri	13.46 m (44 ft 1 3/4 in)	+0.3	
7	(United States) Ciynamon Stevenson	Texas A&M	13.36 m (43 ft 9 3/4 in)	−0.1	
8	(United States) Tiffany Flynn	Miss State	13.32 m (43 ft 8 1/4 in)	−0.9	
9	(United States) Alonie Sutton	Tennessee	13.29 m (43 ft 7 in)	+0.2	
10	(United States) Ja'la Henderson	Wyoming	13.20 m (43 ft 3 1/2 in)	+0.5	
11	(United States) LaChyna Roe	Tennessee	13.20 m (43 ft 3 1/2 in)	−0.4	
12	(British Virgin Islands) Kala Penn	Florida	13.17 m (43 ft 2 1/2 in)	−1.5	
13	(United States) Leah Moran	Indiana	13.15 m (43 ft 1 1/2 in)	+1.1	
14	(United States) Michelle Fokam	Wyoming	13.13 m (43 ft 3/4 in)	−1.1	
15	(United States) Titiana Marsh	Georgia	13.12 m (43 ft 1/2 in)	−0.1	
16	(United States) Essence Thomas	Oklahoma	12.99 m (42 ft 7 1/4 in)	−0.6	
17	(United States) Nicole Iloanya	SMU	12.97 m (42 ft 6 1/2 in)	−0.5	
18	(United States) Bria Matthews	GA Tech	12.92 m (42 ft 4 1/2 in)	−1.0	
19	(United States) LaJarvia Brown	Texas A&M	12.90 m (42 ft 3 3/4 in)	−1.2	
20	(Jamaica) Jehvania Whyte	Northern Illinois	12.84 m (42 ft 1 1/2 in)	+1.0	
21	(United States) Georgia Wahl	Texas	12.84 m (42 ft 1 1/2 in)	−0.8	
22	(United States) Domonique Panton	Duke	12.76 m (41 ft 10 1/4 in)	+1.4	
23	(United States) Lexi Ellis	Oregon	12.75 m (41 ft 9 3/4 in)	−0.7	
-	(Hungary) Eszter Bajnok	Virginia Tech	FOUL		

==== Women's shot put ====
Rank	Athlete	Team	Distance	Notes
1st place, gold medalist(s)	(United States) Samantha Noennig	Arizona State	18.14 m (59 ft 6 in)	
2nd place, silver medalist(s)	(Trinidad and Tobago) Portious Warren	Alabama	18.11 m (59 ft 4 3/4 in)	
3rd place, bronze medalist(s)	(United States) Sade Olatoye	Ohio State	17.88 m (58 ft 7 3/4 in)	
4	(United States) Taylor Latimer	Kansas State	17.67 m (57 ft 11 1/2 in)	
5	(United States) Akealy Moton	North Dakota State	17.46 m (57 ft 3 1/4 in)	
6	(United States) Khayla Dawson	Indiana	17.24 m (56 ft 6 1/2 in)	
7	(United States) Alyssa Wilson	UCLA	17.13 m (56 ft 2 1/4 in)	
8	(United States) Madison Pollard	Indiana	16.94 m (55 ft 6 3/4 in)	
9	(United States) Annette Echikunwoke	Cincinnati	16.78 m (55 ft 1/2 in)	
10	(United States) Aliyah Gustafson	Bowling Green	16.63 m (54 ft 6 1/2 in)	
11	(United States) Haley Teel	Alabama	16.62 m (54 ft 6 1/4 in)	
12	(United States) Adelaide Aquilla	Ohio State	16.59 m (54 ft 5 in)	
13	(United States) Banke Oginni	Wisconsin	16.40 m (53 ft 9 1/2 in)	
14	(United States) Meia Gordon	Oklahoma	16.27 m (53 ft 4 1/2 in)	
15	(United States) Tess Keyzers	Minnesota	16.22 m (53 ft 2 1/2 in)	
16	(United States) Cassaundra Roper	Indiana State	16.17 m (53 ft 1/2 in)	
17	(United States) Nia Britt	Iowa	16.15 m (52 ft 11 3/4 in)	
18	(Jamaica) Gabrielle Bailey	Kent State	15.83 m (51 ft 11 in)	
19	(United States) Erin Howard	Central Michigan	15.74 m (51 ft 7 1/2 in)	
20	(United States) Faith Ette	Oklahoma	15.69 m (51 ft 5 1/2 in)	
21	(United States) Ashlie Blake	UCLA	15.68 m (51 ft 5 1/4 in)	
22	(United States) Kayla Melgar	Abilene Christian	15.26 m (50 ft 3/4 in)	
23	(United States) Nickolette Dunbar	Alabama	15.03 m (49 ft 3 1/2 in)	
24	(United States) Tarynn Sieg	Colorado State	14.88 m (48 ft 9 3/4 in)	

==== Women's discus throw ====
Rank	Athlete	Team	Mark	Notes
1st place, gold medalist(s)	(United States) Laulauga Tausaga	Iowa	63.26 m (207 ft 6 in)	
2nd place, silver medalist(s)	(Jamaica) Shanice Love	Florida State	62.69 m (205 ft 8 in)	
3rd place, bronze medalist(s)	(Jamaica) Shadae Lawrence	Colorado State	60.32 m (197 ft 10 in)	
4	(Moldova) Alexandra Emilianov	Kansas	58.90 m (193 ft 2 in)	
5	(United States) Debbie Ajagbe	Miami	56.92 m (186 ft 8 in)	
6	(Jamaica) Venique Harris	Albany	56.89 m (186 ft 7 in)	
7	(United States) Alyssa Wilson	UCLA	56.70 m (186 ft 0 in)	
8	(United States) Gabi Jacobs	Missouri	56.68 m (185 ft 11 in)	
9	(United States) Seasons Usual	Texas Tech	56.14 m (184 ft 2 in)	
10	(United States) Zakiya Rashid	Miami	55.01 m (180 ft 5 in)	
11	(United States) Kelcey Bedard	Colorado State	54.83 m (179 ft 10 in)	
12	(United States) Abigale Wilson	Akron	54.56 m (179 ft 0 in)	
13	(Canada) Gabrielle Rains	FIU	54.43 m (178 ft 6 in)	
14	(United States) Sydney Laufenberg	Illinois State	54.24 m (177 ft 11 in)	
15	(Germany) Annina Brandenburg	Abilene Christian	53.79 m (176 ft 5 in)	
16	(United States) Erin Reese	Indiana State	53.51 m (175 ft 6 in)	
17	(Greece) Stamatia Scarvelis	Tennessee	52.78 m (173 ft 1 in)	
18	(United States) Kiana Phelps	Oregon	52.36 m (171 ft 9 in)	
19	(United States) Ashley Petr	Kansas State	51.80 m (169 ft 11 in)	
20	(United States) Chelsea Igberaese	Liberty	49.80 m (163 ft 4 in)	
21	(United States) Ashley Anumba	Penn	49.60 m (162 ft 8 in)	
22	(United States) Makenli Forrest	Louisville	49.47 m (162 ft 3 in)	
23	(United States) Jaimi Salone	Stanford	46.77 m (153 ft 5 in)	
-	(United States) Obiageri Amaechi	Princeton	FOUL	

==== Women's javelin throw ====
Rank	Name	Team	Distance	Notes
1st place, gold medalist(s)	(Australia) Mackenzie Little	Stanford	59.44 m (195 ft 0 in)	
2nd place, silver medalist(s)	(United States) Kylee Carter	Auburn	56.40 m (185 ft 0 in)	
3rd place, bronze medalist(s)	(United States) Madison Wiltrout	North Carolina	55.21 m (181 ft 1 in)	
4	(United States) Jenna Gray	Stanford	54.79 m (179 ft 9 in)	
5	(United States) Chase Wolinski	Nebraska	53.75 m (176 ft 4 in)	
6	(United States) Sophia Rivera	Missouri	53.34 m (175 ft 0 in)	
7	(Paraguay) Laura Paredes	Florida State	53.13 m (174 ft 3 in)	
8	(United States) Samantha Zelden	Alabama	52.91 m (173 ft 7 in)	
9	(United States) Maura Fiamoncini	Bucknell	52.66 m (172 ft 9 in)	
10	(United States) Danielle Collier	Miami (Ohio)	51.21 m (168 ft 0 in)	
11	(United States) Sarah Blake	Miss State	51.00 m (167 ft 3 in)	
12	(Norway) Mona Jaidi	Memphis	50.95 m (167 ft 1 in)	
13	(Canada) Ashley Pryke	Memphis	49.39 m (162 ft 0 in)	
14	(Canada) Brittni Wolczyk	Nebraska	49.30 m (161 ft 8 in)	
15	(United States) Sydney Otto	Nebraska	49.05 m (160 ft 11 in)	
16	(United States) Seri Geisler	Arizona State	48.87 m (160 ft 4 in)	
17	(Canada) Keira McCarrell	Oregon	48.82 m (160 ft 2 in)	
18	(United States) Madalaine Stulce	Texas A&M	45.56 m (149 ft 5 in)	
19	(United States) Danielle Konopelski	Wake Forest	45.21 m (148 ft 3 in)	
20	(United States) Akealy Moton	North Dakota State	44.02 m (144 ft 5 in)	
21	(United States) Sara Phelan	Saint Francis	42.82 m (140 ft 5 in)	
22	(United States) Virginia Miller	Stanford	39.24 m (128 ft 8 in)	
23	(United States) Danielle Steff	Monmouth	38.41 m (126 ft 0 in)	
-	(Norway) Stella Weinberg	CSU Northridge	DNS	

==== Women's hammer throw ====
Rank	Athlete	Team	Best mark	Notes
1st place, gold medalist(s)	(Canada) Camryn Rogers	California	71.50 m (234 ft 6 in)	
2nd place, silver medalist(s)	(United States) Erin Reese	Indiana State	71.06 m (233 ft 1 in)	
3rd place, bronze medalist(s)	(United States) Alyssa Wilson	UCLA	69.75 m (228 ft 10 in)	
4	(United States) Sade Olatoye	Ohio State	69.37 m (227 ft 7 in)	
5	(Nigeria) Temi Ogunrinde	Minnesota	68.85 m (225 ft 10 in)	NR
6	(United States) Molli Detloff	North Dakota	67.94 m (222 ft 10 in)	
7	(Norway) Beatrice Llano	Arizona State	67.74 m (222 ft 2 in)	
8	(Greece) Stamatia Scarvelis	Tennessee	67.59 m (221 ft 9 in)	
9	(Slovakia) Veronika Kanuchova	Florida State	67.37 m (221 ft 0 in)	
10	(Czech Republic) Pavla Kuklova	Virginia Tech	65.99 m (216 ft 6 in)	
11	(United States) Madi Malone	Auburn	65.49 m (214 ft 10 in)	
12	(Canada) Kaila Butler	Bowling Green	64.64 m (212 ft 0 in)	
13	(United States) Shauniece Oneal	Southern Illinois	64.59 m (211 ft 10 in)	
14	(United States) Bailey Retzlaff	North Dakota State	63.89 m (209 ft 7 in)	
15	(United States) Makenli Forrest	Louisville	62.50 m (205 ft 0 in)	
16	(United States) Onyie Chibuogwu	Washington	62.33 m (204 ft 5 in)	
17	(United States) Hana Feilzer	Montana	62.02 m (203 ft 5 in)	
18	(Bosnia and Herzegovina) Stefani Vukajlovic	Duke	61.79 m (202 ft 8 in)	
19	(United States) Lara Boman	South Dakota	61.78 m (202 ft 8 in)	
20	(United States) Nycia Ford	Indiana	60.87 m (199 ft 8 in)	
21	(Norway) Helene Ingvaldsen	Kansas State	60.69 m (199 ft 1 in)	
22	(United Kingdom) Rebecca Keating	Missouri	58.89 m (193 ft 2 in)	
23	(United States) Annette Echikunwoke	Cincinnati	58.57 m (192 ft 1 in)	
24	(United States) Mayyi Mahama	Penn	55.63 m (182 ft 6 in)	

==== Heptathlon ====
Rank	Athlete	Team	Overall points	100 H	HJ	SP	200 m	LJ	JT	800 m
1st place, gold medalist(s)	(United States) Ashtin Zamzow	Texas	6222	1075; 13.33	953; 1.78 m (5 ft 10 in)	724; 12.95 m (42 ft 5 3/4 in)	959; 24.23	853; 6.01 m (19 ft 8 1/2 in)	852; 49.56 m (162 ft 7 in)	806; 2:21.31
2nd place, silver medalist(s)	(Trinidad and Tobago) Tyra Gittens	Texas A&M	6049	1052; 13.49	1067; 1.87 m (6 ft 1 1/2 in)	759; 13.47 m (44 ft 2 1/4 in)	994; 23.86	946; 6.31 m (20 ft 8 1/4 in)	538; 33.22 m (108 ft 11 3/4 in)	693; 2:29.99
3rd place, bronze medalist(s)	(United States) Michelle Atherley	Miami	6014	1129; 12.97	842; 1.69 m (5 ft 6 1/2 in)	718; 12.86 m (42 ft 2 1/4 in)	982; 23.99	868; 6.06 m (19 ft 10 1/2 in)	518; 32.18 m (105 ft 6 3/4 in)	957; 2:10.50
4	(United States) Hope Bender	UC Santa Barbara	5955	1053; 13.48	806; 1.66 m (5 ft 5 1/4 in)	631; 11.55 m (37 ft 10 1/2 in)	1017; 23.63	859; 6.03 m (19 ft 9 1/4 in)	626; 37.83 m (124 ft 1 1/4 in)	963; 2:10.10
5	(United States) Erinn Beattie	UC Davis	5924	1007; 13.80	771; 1.63 m (5 ft 4 in)	595; 11.00 m (36 ft 1 in)	893; 24.93	877; 6.09 m (19 ft 11 3/4 in)	597; 36.35 m (119 ft 3 in)	926; 2:12.63
6	(Norway) Amanda Froeynes	Florida	5891	957; 14.15	916; 1.75 m (5 ft 8 3/4 in)	670; 12.14 m (39 ft 9 3/4 in)	827; 25.66	819; 5.90 m (19 ft 4 1/4 in)	758; 44.73 m (146 ft 9 in)	944; 2:11.42
7	(United States) Jordan Gray	Kennesaw State	5846	1003; 13.83	806; 1.66 m (5 ft 5 1/4 in)	771; 13.65 m (44 ft 9 1/4 in)	886; 25.01	905; 6.18 m (20 ft 3 1/4 in)	664; 39.81 m (130 ft 7 1/4 in)	811; 2:20.92
8	(United States) Lauren Taubert	Kansas State	5793	1018; 13.72	879; 1.72 m (5 ft 7 1/2 in)	617; 11.33 m (37 ft 2 in)	966; 24.15	738; 5.63 m (18 ft 5 1/2 in)	624; 37.73 m (123 ft 9 1/4 in)	951; 2:10.94
9	(United States) Hannah Rusnak	Washington	5779	1049; 13.51	842; 1.69 m (5 ft 6 1/2 in)	711; 12.75 m (41 ft 9 3/4 in)	901; 24.85	843; 5.98 m (19 ft 7 1/4 in)	726; 43.05 m (141 ft 2 3/4 in)	707; 2:28.90
10	(United States) Erin Marsh	Duke	5707	1069; 13.37	771; 1.63 m (5 ft 4 in)	621; 11.39 m (37 ft 4 1/4 in)	969; 24.12	850; 6.00 m (19 ft 8 in)	634; 38.26 m (125 ft 6 1/4 in)	793; 2:22.26
11	(United States) Sterling Lester	Georgia	5694	1090; 13.23	806; 1.66 m (5 ft 5 1/4 in)	678; 12.25 m (40 ft 2 1/4 in)	1027; 23.52	765; 5.72 m (18 ft 9 in)	486; 30.49 m (100 ft 1/4 in)	842; 2:18.61
12	(United States) Jestena Mattson	Fresno State	5576	960; 14.13	771; 01.63 m (5 ft 4 in)	649; 11.81 m (38 ft 8 3/4 in)	969; 24.12	837; 5.96 m (19 ft 6 1/2 in)	568; 34.82 m (114 ft 2 3/4 in)	822; 2:20.12
13	(Germany) Nicola Ader	Nevada	5571	1034; 13.61	953; 1.78 m (5 ft 10 in)	634; 11.59 m (38 ft 1/4 in)	822; 25.72	831; 5.94 m (19 ft 5 3/4 in)	625; 37.81 m (124 ft 1/2 in)	672; 2:31.68
14	(United States) Carly Paul	Brown	5535	918; 14.43	953; 1.78 m (5 ft 10 in)	587; 10.88 m (35 ft 8 1/4 in)	871; 25.17	780; 5.77 m (18 ft 11 in)	590; 35.97 m (118 ft 0 in)	836; 2:19.10
15	(Norway) Emilie Berge	South Alabama	5493	967; 14.08	842; 1.69 m (5 ft 6 1/2 in)	562; 10.50 m (34 ft 5 1/4 in)	809; 25.87	795; 5.82 m (19 ft 1 in)	669; 40.10 m (131 ft 6 1/2 in)	849; 2:18.13
16	(United States) Asya Reynolds	Michigan State	5487	943; 14.25	806; 1.66 m (5 ft 5 1/4 in)	637; 11.64 m (38 ft 2 1/4 in)	836; 25.56	792; 5.81 m (19 ft 1/2 in)	640; 38.58 m (126 ft 6 3/4 in)	833; 2:19.27
17	(United States) Tria Simmons	Iowa	5479	1052; 13.49	842; 1.69 m (5 ft 6 1/2 in)	672; 12.16 m (39 ft 10 1/2 in)	941; 24.42	774; 5.75 m (18 ft 10 1/4 in)	364; 24.05 m (78 ft 10 3/4 in)	834; 2:19.26
18	(United States) Ariel Okorie	Kansas State	5439	1021; 13.70	806; 1.66 m (5 ft 5 1/4 in)	518; 9.82 m (32 ft 2 1/2 in)	903; 24.82	723; 5.58 m (18 ft 3 1/2 in)	666; 39.92 m (130 ft 11 1/2 in)	802; 2:21.59
19	(Lithuania) Beatrice Juskeviciute	Cornell	5438	882; 14.70	736; 1.60 m (5 ft 2 3/4 in)	694; 12.50 m (41 ft 0 in)	852; 25.38	712; 5.54 m (18 ft 2 in)	769; 45.28 m (148 ft 6 1/2 in)	793; 2:22:26
20	(United States) Christina Chenault	UCLA	5386	921; 14.41	736; 1.60 m (5 ft 2 3/4 in)	651; 11.85 m (38 ft 10 1/2 in)	874; 25.14	777; 5.76 m (18 ft 10 3/4 in)	532; 32.93 m (108 ft 1/4 in)	895; 2:14.86
21	(United States) Amanda Levin	North Dakota State	5332	844; 14.98	736; 1.60 m (5 ft 2 3/4 in)	662; 12.01 m (39 ft 4 3/4 in)	931; 24.52	768; 5.73 m (18 ft 9 1/2 in)	533; 32.97 m (108 ft 2 in)	858; 2:17.50
22	(United States) Michaela Wenning	Colorado	5274	929; 14.35	806; 1.66 m (5 ft 5 1/4 in)	629; 11.51 m (37 ft 9 in)	795; 26.02	688; 5.46 m (17 ft 10 3/4 in)	660; 39.60 m (129 ft 11 in)	767; 2:24.23
23	(United States) Jenny Kimbro	Iowa	5023	1053; 13.48	842; 1.69 m (5 ft 6 1/2 in)	621; 11.39 m (37 ft 4 1/4 in)	946; 24.36	729; 5.60 m (18 ft 4 1/4 in)	0; 00.00 m (0 in)	832; 2:19.34
24	(United States) Maja Wichhart-Donzo	Colorado	4554	949; 14.21	806; 1.66 m (5 ft 5 1/4 in)	610; 11.22 m (36 ft 9 1/2 in)	DQ; 00.00	756; 5.69 m (18 ft 8 in)	556; 34.20 m (112 ft 2 1/4 in)	877; 2:16.14

== Standings ==
=== Men ===
- Only top ten teams shown

Rank	University	Score	Notes
1st place, gold medalist(s)	Texas Tech	60	
2nd place, silver medalist(s)	Florida	50	
3rd place, bronze medalist(s)	Houston	40	
4	Georgia	32.5	
5	Stanford	32	
6	Texas A&M	29	
7	LSU	28	
8	BYU	27	
9	Texas	26	
10	Alabama	25	

=== Women ===
- Only top ten teams shown

Rank	University	Score	Notes
1st place, gold medalist(s)	Arkansas	64	
2nd place, silver medalist(s)	USC	57	
3rd place, bronze medalist(s)	LSU	43	
4	Texas A&M	38	
5	Oregon	34	
6	Florida	32	
7	Alabama	29	
8	New Mexico	27	
9	Colorado	24	
10	Florida State	20	

== See also ==
- NCAA Men's Division I Outdoor Track and Field Championships
- NCAA Women's Division I Outdoor Track and Field Championships
