= Trumaine Jefferson =

American long jumper (born 1995)

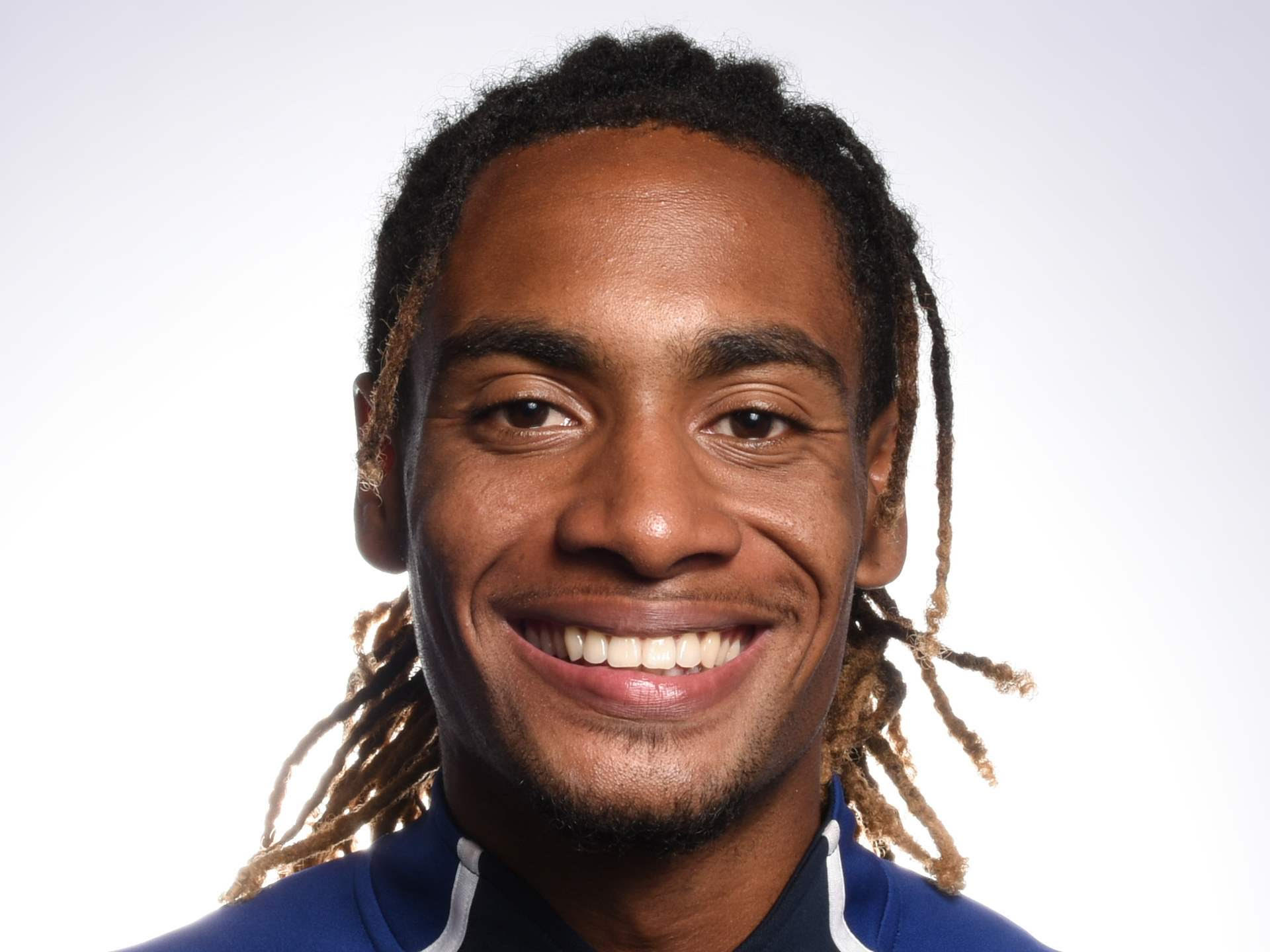

Personal information
- Nationality: American
- Born: April 21, 1995 (age 31) Killeen, TX
- Home town: Houston, TX
- Education: University of Houston
- Occupation: American Long Jumper
- Years active: 2013 - present
- Height: 6 ft 0 in (183 cm)

Sport
- Country: United States
- Sport: Track and field
- Event: Long jump
- College team: Houston Cougars
- Turned pro: 2019
- Coached by: Carl Lewis

Achievements and titles
- Personal best(s): Long Jump: 8.18m (Austin, TX, 2019), 400 m: 46.43 (Houston, TX, 2017)

Trumaine Jefferson (born April 21, 1995) is an American long jumper. Jefferson graduated from Oak Ridge High School (Montgomery County, Texas) in 2014, where he competed in various outdoor track and field events. During his college career at the University of Houston, Jefferson achieved his Long Jump personal best of 8.18m at the 2019 NCAA Division I Outdoor Track and Field Championships. In 2019, he also competed in the men's long jump at the 2019 World Athletics Championships held in Doha, Qatar. He did not qualify to compete in the final. Jefferson went on to compete in the men's long jump event at the 2019 Padova International Meeting held in Padova, Italy where he came off on top as 1st.

Jefferson began 2021 with a season's best of 8.00m at the Miramar Invitational held at the Ansin Sports Complex in Miramar, Florida. He qualified and competed for a spot on the U.S. Olympic team at the United States Olympic Trials (track and field) in June 2021.
