= 2019 USA Outdoor Track and Field Championships =

2019 USA Track & Field Outdoor Championships
- Dates: July 25–28
- Host city: Des Moines, Iowa, U.S.
- Venue: Drake Stadium, Drake University
- Level: Senior
- Type: Outdoor
- Events: 40 (men: 20; women: 20)
- Records set: 1 WR, 3 NR

The 2019 USA Track & Field Outdoor Championships were held at Drake Stadium on the campus of Drake University in Des Moines, Iowa. Organized by USA Track & Field, the four-day competition took place from July 25–28 and served as the national championships in track and field for the United States.

== Men's results ==
Key: ≠ Not selected in respective event because the athlete has not achieved the required qualifying standard.
Athletes can still pursue standards following this meet and still make the team provided they attain it before the cutoff date.

=== Men track events ===
Event	Gold		Silver		Bronze	
100 meters (Wind: -1.0 m/s)	Christian Coleman	9.99	Mike Rodgers	10.12	Christopher Belcher	10.12
200 meters (Wind: -0.7 m/s)	Noah Lyles	19.78	Christian Coleman	20.02	Ameer Webb ≠	20.45
400 meters	Fred Kerley	43.64 PB	Michael Norman	43.79	Nathan Strother	44.29 PB
800 meters	Donavan Brazier	1:45.62	Clayton Murphy	1:46.01	Bryce Hoppel	1:46.31
1500 meters	Craig Engels	3:44.93	Matthew Centrowitz Jr.	3:44.97	Josh Thompson ≠	3:45.25
5000 meters	Lopez Lomong ≠	13:25.53	Paul Chelimo	13:25.80	Woody Kincaid ≠	13:26.84 PB
10,000 meters	Lopez Lomong	27:30.06 PB	Shadrack Kipchirchir	27:47.71	Leonard Korir	28:01.43
110 m hurdles	Daniel Roberts	13.23	Grant Holloway	13.36	Devon Allen	13.38
400 m hurdles	Rai Benjamin	47.23	TJ Holmes	48.56	Amere Lattin	48.66
3000 m steeplechase	Hillary Bor	8:18.05	Stanley Kebenei	8:19.12	Andy Bayer	8:23.23
10 kilometers walk	Nick Christie	41:56.61	Emmanuel Corvera	43:10.87	John Cody Risch	43:36.43

=== Men field events ===
Event	Gold		Silver		Bronze	
High jump	Jeron Robinson	2.30 m (7 ft 6 1/2 in) SB	Shelby McEwen	2.30 m (7 ft 6 1/2 in) PB	Jonathan Wells ≠	2.24 m (7 ft 4 in)
Pole vault	Sam Kendricks	6.06 m (19 ft 10 1/2 in) AR WL	Cole Walsh	5.76 m (18 ft 10 3/4 in)	KC Lightfoot	5.76 m (18 ft 10 3/4 in) PB
Long jump	Ja'Mari Ward ≠	8.12 m (26 ft 7 1/2 in)	Will Claye	8.06 m (26 ft 5 1/4 in)	Trumaine Jefferson	8.02 m (26 ft 3 1/2 in)
Triple jump	Donald Scott	17.74 m (58 ft 2 1/4 in)w	Will Claye	17.70 m (58 ft 3/4 in)w	Omar Craddock	17.55 m (57 ft 6 3/4 in)
Shot put	Ryan Crouser	22.62 m (74 ft 2 1/2 in)	Joe Kovacs	22.31 m (73 ft 2 1/4 in)	Darrell Hill	22.11 m (72 ft 6 1/4 in)
Discus throw	Sam Mattis	66.69 m (218 ft 9 in) SB	Brian Williams	65.76 m (215 ft 8 in) PB	Kord Ferguson ≠	63.25 m (207 ft 6 in) PB
Hammer throw	Conor McCullough	78.14 m (256 ft 4 in) PB	Rudy Winkler	76.51 m (251 ft 0 in)	Daniel Haugh	76.44 m (250 ft 9 in) PB
Javelin throw	Michael Shuey ≠	82.85 m (271 ft 9 in) PB	Riley Dolezal ≠	82.84 m (271 ft 9 in)	Tim Glover ≠	77.47 m (254 ft 2 in)
Decathlon	Devon Williams	8295 pts SB	Solomon Simmons	8227 pts PB	Harrison Williams ≠	8188 pts

== Women's results ==
Key: ≠ Not selected in respective event because the athlete has not achieved the required qualifying standard.
Athletes can still pursue standards following this meet and still make the team provided they attain it before the cutoff date.

=== Women track events ===
Event	Gold		Silver		Bronze	
100 meters (Wind: -1.7 m/s)	Teahna Daniels	11.20	English Gardner	11.25	Morolake Akinosun	11.28
200 meters (Wind: -1.2 m/s)	Dezerea Bryant	22.47	Brittany Brown	22.61	Angie Annelus	22.71
400 meters	Shakima Wimbley	50.21	Kendall Ellis	50.38	Wadeline Jonathas	50.44
800 meters	Ajeé Wilson	1:57.72	Hanna Green	1:58.19	Raevyn Rogers	1:58.84
1500 meters	Shelby Houlihan	4:03.18	Jenny Simpson	4:03.41	Nikki Hiltz	4:03.55
5000 meters	Shelby Houlihan	15:15.50	Karissa Schweizer	15:17.03	Elinor Purrier St. Pierre	15:17.46
10,000 meters	Molly Huddle	31:58.47	Emily Sisson	32:02.19	Kellyn Taylor ≠	32:02.74
100 m hurdles (Wind: -1.2 m/s)	Kendra Harrison	12.44	Nia Ali	12.55	Brianna Rollins-McNeal	12.61
400 m hurdles	Dalilah Muhammad	52.20 WR	Sydney McLaughlin	52.88	Ashley Spencer	53.11
3000 m steeplechase	Emma Coburn	9:25.63	Courtney Frerichs	9:26.61	Colleen Quigley	9:30.97
10 kilometers walk	Katie Burnett	46:12.45	Miranda Melville	46:49.90	Robyn Stevens	47:22.54

=== Women field events ===
Event	Gold		Silver		Bronze	
High jump	Vashti Cunningham	1.96 m (6 ft 5 in)	Inika McPherson	1.94 m (6 ft 4 1/4 in)	Ty Butts ≠	1.92 m (6 ft 3 1/2 in)
Pole vault	Sandi Morris	4.85 m (15 ft 10 3/4 in)	Katie Nageotte	4.80 m (15 ft 8 3/4 in)	Jenn Suhr	4.70 m (15 ft 5 in)
Long jump	Brittney Reese	7.00 m (22 ft 11 1/2 in)	Jasmine Todd	6.79 m (22 ft 3 1/4 in)	Sha'Keela Saunders	6.78 m (22 ft 2 3/4 in)
Triple jump	Keturah Orji	14.56 m (47 ft 9 in)	Tori Franklin	14.36 m (47 ft 1 1/4 in)	Imani Oliver ≠	13.86 m (45 ft 5 1/2 in)
Shot put	Chase Ealey	19.56 m (64 ft 2 in)	Michelle Carter	18.69 m (61 ft 3 3/4 in)	Magdalyn Ewen	18.44 m (60 ft 5 3/4 in)
Discus throw	Valarie Allman	64.34 m (211 ft 1 in)	Kelsey Card	63.33 m (207 ft 9 in)	Laulauga Tausaga	62.08 m (203 ft 8 in)
Hammer throw	DeAnna Price	78.24 m (256 ft 8 in) AR	Gwen Berry	76.46 m (250 ft 10 in)	Brooke Andersen	75.30 m (247 ft 0 in)
Javelin throw	Ariana Ince	61.06 m (200 ft 3 in)	Kara Winger	59.73 m (195 ft 11 in)	Jenna Gray ≠	57.29 m (187 ft 11 in)
Heptathlon	Erica Bougard	6663 pts	Kendell Williams	6610 pts	Chari Hawkins ≠	6230 pts

== Masters exhibition events ==
Event	Gold		Silver		Bronze	
Women's 200 meters	Emma McGowan W51	27.20	Roxanne Brockner W53	27.73	Joy Upshaw W58	27.82
Men's 200 meters	Karnell Vickers M52	24.69	David Pitts M56	24.82	John Curtis M53	25.02

== International selection ==
The 2019 USA Track & Field Outdoor Championships serve as the selection meet for United States representatives in international competitions, including the 2019 World Championships in Athletics. In order to be entered, athletes needed to achieve a qualifying standard mark and place in the top 3 in their event. The United States team, as managed by USATF, can also bring a qualified back up athlete in case one of the team members is unable to perform. In their qualification standards, the IAAF allows the option to add athletes based on their worldwide ranking.

Additionally, defending world champions and 2019 Diamond League champions receive byes into the World Championships.

A database was formed to illustrate how International Federations qualified and selected the athletes to represent their countries at the 2019 World Athletics Championships.

=== Defending 2017 World Champions ===
- Christian Taylor - triple jump
- Justin Gatlin - 100 m
- Sam Kendricks - pole vault
- Phyllis Francis - 400 m
- Tori Bowie - 100 m
- Kori Carter - 400 m hurdles
- Emma Coburn - 3000 m steeplechase
- Brittney Reese - long jump

Since some of these athletes also placed top three in these championships, the following fourth place athletes will also qualify:

- Tori Bowie – long jump
- Zach Bradford – pole vault
- Allie Ostrander – 3000 m steeplechase

=== 2019 Diamond League Champions ===
To be determined at the Weltklasse Zürich on 29 August, and at the Memorial Van Damme in Brussels on 6 September.

American champions in Zurich were:

- Noah Lyles 100 meters, no change due to Gatlin
- Donavan Brazier 800 meters, possibly opening up a spot for 4th place Isaiah Harris, who achieved a World Championship qualifying time on August 27 in Rovereto.
- Sam Kendricks pole vault, no change
- Sydney McLaughlin 400 meters hurdles, no change due to Carter

American champions in Brussels were:

- Noah Lyles 200 meters, since Ameer Webb did not achieve the 20.40 qualifying mark, he should be replaced by Rodney Rowe. With Lyles getting a wild card spot, the fourth spot would be Kenny Bednarek who pulled up in the championship race but was credited with finishing
- Michael Norman 400 meters, opening up an individual spot for 4th place Vernon Norwood who is already on the relay
- Christian Taylor triple jump, no change
- Ajee Wilson 800 meters, opening up an individual spot for Ce’Aira Brown

=== Additionally qualified ===
- Mason Finley 7th place in discus has the world qualifying standard
- Keenon Laine was ranked #27 in the high jump, and was 6th with 2.21 m at the USA Championships.

Deadline rankings:

- While not achieving a qualifying mark, Michael Shuey was ranked #29 and Riley Dolezal was ranked #30 in the javelin throw on September 6 and should be invited based on their being ranked within the field minimums. Also potentially invited:
- Chari Hawkins was ranked #17 in the heptathlon
- Harrison Williams was ranked #18 in the decathlon
- Ja'Mari Ward was in a 4 way tie for the 32nd and final spot in the long jump

== Qualification ==
USA Track & Field sets minimum performances standards for entry into the national championships. In order to merit entry into the championships, an athlete must meet that standard, or better, within a set time frame prior to the competition. For the 10,000 m, 20,000 m race walk, and combined events the qualifying window was from January 1, 2018 – July 21, 2019. For all other events the qualifying window was June 1, 2018 – July 21, 2019. The organisers also set a maximum number of entrants and rounds for each event.

There are also automatic qualifying criteria outside of the entry standards. Athletes who are the reigning indoor or outdoor national champion are automatically qualified to enter that event. Athletes who meet the "A" standard for entry into the previous Olympic Games or World Championships in Athletics receive automatic entry, as do any athletes who placed in the top three of their event at the 2018 USA Outdoor Track and Field Championships.

Non-American athletes may compete as invited guests only and their performances may not count towards the national results nor international team selection. Athletes must have United States citizenship to be selected to represent the nation, else non-citizens must receive approval from the Track & Field Committee and be due to gain United States citizenship prior to the international meet that the national championships is selecting for.

For events over distances from 100 m to 800 m, performances will only be accepted if fully automatic timing (FAT) is used. For performances beyond that distance, FAT times are also used, but in the event that the athlete has not recorded a FAT performance, a manually recorded time may be used.

Event	Men's standard	Women's standard	Max entrants	Rounds
100 m	10.16	11.26	32	3
200 m	20.50	23.20	32	3
400 m	45.70	52.20	32	3
800 m	1:47.50	2:03.00	32	3
1500 m	3:39.00 (3:56.50 for mile run)	4:09.00 (4:28.50 for mile run)	30	2
5000 m	13:35.00	15:25.00	24	1
10,000 m	28:40.00	32:25.00	24	1
10,000 m race walk	47:00:00	50:00:00	18	1
110/100 m hurdles	13.80	13.10	32	3
400 m hurdles	50.35	56.80	28	3
3000 m s'chase	8:40.00	9:50.00	26	2
High jump	2.24 m (7 ft 4 in)	1.85 m (6 ft 3/4 in)	18	1
Pole vault	5.62 m (18 ft 5 1/4 in)	4.50 m (14 ft 9 in)	18	1
Long jump	8.00 m (26 ft 2 3/4 in)	6.60 m (21 ft 7 3/4 in)	18	1
Triple jump	16.40 m (53 ft 9 1/2 in)	13.60 m (44 ft 7 1/4 in)	18	1
Shot put	20.30 m (66 ft 7 in)	17.75 m (58 ft 2 3/4 in)	18	1
Discus throw	60.75 m (199 ft 3 1/2 in)	58.00 m (190 ft 3 1/4 in)	18	1
Hammer throw	69.40 m (227 ft 8 1/4 in)	67.00 m (219 ft 9 3/4 in)	18	1
Javelin throw	73.50 m (241 ft 1 1/2 in)	54.00 m (177 ft 1 3/4 in)	18	1
Decathlon/Heptathlon	7800 pts	6200 pts	16	1

== Schedule ==
The competition took place from July 25–28.

Event schedule
DAY ONE -- THURSDAY, JULY 25TH
NBC Sports Gold 2:45 CST
Time (CST)	Event	Division Round
4:40 PM	100m	Women First Round
5:05 PM	100m	Men First Round
5:30 PM	1,500m	Women First Round
5:57 PM	400m Hurdles	Men First Round
6:22 PM	800m	Women First Round
6:47 PM	800m	Men First Round
7:12 PM	400m	Women First Round
7:37 PM	400m	Men First Round
8:02 PM	400m	Men Decathlon
8:21 PM	3,000m Steeple	Men First Round
8:50 PM	10,000m	Women Final
9:29 PM	10,000m	Men Final
Decathlon
2:45 PM	100m	Men Decathlon
3:30 PM	Long Jump	Men Decathlon
4:30 PM	Shot Put	Men Decathlon
5:45 PM	High Jump	Men Decathlon
8:02 PM	400m	Men Decathlon
Field Events
5:30 PM	Discus Throw	Men Final
6:00 PM	Javelin Throw	Women Final
6:30 PM	Triple Jump	Women Final
End of Day 1
DAY TWO -- FRIDAY, JULY 26TH
NBC Sports Gold 12:30 PM CST
NBCSN 6:00 PM - 8:00 PM CST
Time (CST)	Event	Division Round
4:05 PM	100m Hurdles	Women First Round
4:30 PM	1,500m	Men First Round
4:57 PM	3,000m Steeple	Women First Round
5:25 PM	400m Hurdles	Women First Round
5:50 PM	100m	Women Semifinal
6:04 PM	100m	Men Semifinal
6:18 PM	800m	Women Semifinal
6:32 PM	800m	Men Semifinal
6:46 PM	1,500m	Men Decathlon
6:56 PM	400m	Women Semifinal
7:14 PM	400m	Men Semifinal
7:28 PM	400m Hurdles	Men Semifinal
7:44 PM	100m	Women Final
7:53 PM	100m	Men Final
Decathlon
12:30 PM	110m Hurdles	Men Decathlon
1:30 PM	Discus Throw	Men Decathlon
3:15 PM	Pole Vault	Men Decathlon
4:45 PM	Javelin Throw "A"	Men Decathlon
5:40 PM	Javelin Throw "B"	Men Decathlon
6:46 PM	1,500m	Men Decathlon
Field Events
5:15 PM	Hammer Throw	Men Final
5:30 PM	Triple Jump	Men Final
5:45 PM	Shot Put	Men Final
End of Day 2
DAY THREE -- SATURDAY, JULY 27TH
NBC Sports Gold 1:00 PM CST
NBC 3:00 PM - 5:00 PM CST
Time (CST)	Event	Division Round
1:00 PM	100m Hurdles	Women Heptathlon
2:00 PM	200m	Women First Round
2:25 PM	200m	Men First Round
2:48 PM	National Antem	Ceremony
2:52 PM	Legend Coach	Ceremony
3:03 PM	100m Hurdles	Women Semifinal
3:17 PM	110m Hurdles	Men First Round
3:43 PM	1,500m	Women Final
3:54 PM	3,000m Steeple	Men Final
4:08 PM	400m Hurdles	Women Semifinal
4:27 PM	400m Hurdles	Men Final
4:36 PM	400m	Women Final
4:45 PM	400m	Men Final
4:54 PM	100m Hurdles	Women Final
5:03 PM	200m	Women Heptathlon
Heptathlon
1:00 PM	100m Hurdles	Women Heptathlon
2:00 PM	High Jump	Women Heptathlon
3:55 PM	Shot Put	Women Heptathlon
5:03 PM	200m	Women Heptathlon
Exhibition Events
1:45 PM	Masters 50+ 200m	Women Exhibition
1:52 PM	Masters 50+ 200m	Men Exhibition
Field Events
2:00 PM	Pole Vault	Men Final
2:20 PM	Javelin Throw	Men Final
2:30 PM	Hammer Throw	Women Final
2:40 PM	High Jump	Women Final
2:45 PM	Long Jump	Women Final
End of Day 3
DAY FOUR -- SUNDAY, JULY 28TH
NBC Sports Gold 3:00 PM CST
NBCSN 6:00 PM - 7:00 PM CST
NBC 7:00 PM - 8:00 PM CST
Time (CST)	Event	Division Round
5:00 PM	200m	Men Semifinal
5:14 PM	200m	Women Semifinal
5:28 PM	110m Hurdles	Men Semifinal
5:42 PM	800m	Women Heptathlon
5:53 PM	National Anthem	Ceremony
6:02 PM	800m	Men Final
6:09 PM	3000m Steeple	Women Final
6:23 PM	5,000m	Men Final
6:42 PM	5,000m	Women Final
7:04 PM	400m Hurdles	Women Final
7:17 PM	800m	Women Final
7:25 PM	110m Hurdles	Men Final
7:33 PM	1,500m	Men Final
7:43 PM	200m	Women Final
7:51 PM	200m	Men Final
Field Events
5:05 PM	Discus Throw	Women Final
5:10 PM	Pole Vault	Women Final
5:20 PM	High Jump	Men Final
5:30 PM	Long Jump	Men Final
5:45 PM	Shot Put	Women Final
Heptathlon
3:00 PM	Long Jump	Women Heptathlon
4:05 PM	Javelin Throw	Women Heptathlon
5:42 PM	800m	Women Heptathlon
End of Championship
