= Rodney Rowe (athlete) =

American sprinter (born 1997)

Personal information
- Nationality: American
- Born: March 17, 1997 (age 29)

Sport
- Country: United States
- Sport: Track and field
- Event: Sprints
- College team: North Carolina A&T Aggies
- Coached by: Duane Ross

Achievements and titles
- Personal bests: 100 m: 10.05 (Greensboro, 2019); 200 m: 20.15 (Greensboro, 2019)
Medal record
Men's athletics
Representing North Carolina A&T
NCAA Division I Championships
Bronze medal – third place	2017 Eugene	4 × 100 relay

Rodney Rowe (born March 17, 1997) is an American track and field sprinter specializing in the 100 and 200 meters. Rowe competed at the collegiate level for North Carolina Agricultural & Technical State University where he was a 2-time All-American and 10-time MEAC champion. He attended high school at Clayton High School in Clayton, North Carolina.

== Amateur career ==
In 2015, Rowe accepted an athletic scholarship to attend the North Carolina Agricultural & Technical State University in Greensboro, North Carolina, where he ran for coach Duane Ross' North Carolina A&T Aggies team in National Collegiate Athletic Association (NCAA) competition. As a freshman, Rowe was among the quartet that won the 4 × 100 m relay in 39.58, setting a new record at the 2016 MEAC Championships. In addition to his performance in the relay, Rowe was a finalist in both the 100 and 200 meter races, placing 3rd (10.39) and 2nd (20.93) respectively. Rowe went on to compete at the 2016 NCAA Division I Championships as a member of the 4 × 100 m relay team, but did not qualify for the finals.

In his sophomore season, Rowe placed 2nd in both the indoor 60 m with a time of 6.76, and the 200 m with a time of 21.59 at the 2017 MEAC Indoor Championships. During the outdoor season, Rowe and his teammates defended their 4 × 100 m relay title, running 39.44, breaking the meet's previous record, also set by A&T. At the same meet, Rowe's individual performances earned him 2nd in the 200 m in 20.79 and 5th in the 100 m in 10.38. Rowe and the 4 × 100 relay team qualified for the 2017 NCAA Outdoor Championships where they ran 38.48 during a qualifying round recording the ninth-fastest time in NCAA history. In the event finals, the team placed 3rd, behind teams from Houston and Auburn, with a time of 38.57.

In his junior season, Rowe won his first individual MEAC Championship when he won the Indoor 200 m in 21.36s. He, along with his teammates, won the indoor 4 × 100 relay in 3:14.60 and Rowe placed 3rd in the indoor 60 m in 6.74s. Rowe and the men's relay team, qualified for the 2018 NCAA Division I Indoor Championships in the 4 × 100 meter relay, however they failed to qualify for the finals. During the outdoor season, Rowe won the 200 m in 20.42 s and placed 2nd in the 100 m at the 2018 MEAC Championships. Rowe and his teammates also defended their 4 × 100 meter relay title, for the third consecutive time, running in 39.42 s. Rowe qualified for the 2018 NCAA Outdoor Championships in both the 200 m and the 4 × 100 meter relay. At the NCAA championships, Rowe placed 5th in the 200 meters with a time of 20.52 s, earning first team All-American honors in the event. At the same event, Rowe and the relay team advanced to the finals of the 4 × 100 m relay, however were unable to finish. Rowe finished his junior season with the distinction of being one of two Aggies in school history to be a 3-time first-team All-American athlete.

In his senior season, Rowe became MEAC champion in the indoor 60 meters, running a time of 6.72 s. Rowe also claimed his 4th individual MEAC championship as he defended his 200-meter title, running a time of 21.42 s. Rowe qualified and competed in the 200 meters at the 2019 NCAA Indoor Championships. At the meet, Rowe would not advance to the finals, running a time of 21.03, which was 12th overall. In the outdoor season, Rowe won the 100 m, 200 m, and 4 × 100 meter relay titles at the MEAC Outdoor Championships. In the 100 meters, Rowe ran new personal best time of 10.15, in an exciting come from behind victory in the finals. He was also able to defend his title in the 200 meters, running another personal best time of 20.12, placing him second in the nation in the event. At the NCAA Division I Championships, Rowe competed in the 100 m, 200 m & 4 × 100 m events. In the individual events, Rowe would not advance to the finals, placing 11th and 13th in the 100 and 200 meter races. In the relay event, Rowe and teammates made the finals where they placed 5th with a time of 38.59. Following the NCAA Championships, Rowe went on to compete for the United States at the NACAC Championships. At the event, he placed 6th in the finals of the 100 meters and 4th in the finals of the 200 meters. Later in the season, Rowe competed in the 100 & 200 meter events at the 2019 USA Outdoor Track and Field Championships. In the 100 meters, he placed 17th, running a 10.41 seconds in the preliminary round and not advancing to the later rounds. In the 200 meters, Rowe made the finals, where he placed 7th, with a time of 20.75. Although he did not get an automatic spot on the United States World Championship team, by placing in the top 3 at the USA Championships, Rowe had already met the qualifying standard for the 200 meters prior to the meet and earned an invitation to represent the United States at the 2019 World Athletics Championships. At the World Championships, Rowe ran a time of 20.92 seconds, placing him 6th in his heat; which was not fast enough to qualify for the later rounds and ending his 2019 season.

== Statistics ==
Information from IAAF profile or Track & Field Results Reporting System unless otherwise noted.

=== Personal bests ===
Event	Time (sec)	Venue	Date	Note
100 metres	10.05	Greensboro, North Carolina, United States	May 4, 2019	+1.2 Wind
200 metres	20.15	Greensboro, North Carolina, United States	May 4, 2019	+0.4 wind
4 × 100 metres relay	38.48	Eugene, Oregon, United States	June 7, 2017	
4 × 200 metres relay	1:32.33	Conway, South Carolina, United States	March 18, 2016	
Indoor events
55 metres	6.32	Winston-Salem, North Carolina, United States	February 14, 2015	
60 metres	6.67	Fayetteville, Arkansas, United States	February 9, 2018	
200 metres	20.70	Columbia, South Carolina, United States	February 2, 2019	
300 metres	33.77	Clemson, South Carolina, United States	January 7, 2017	
4 × 400 metres relay	3:07.33	Blacksburg, Virginia, United States	February 16, 2019	

- All information taken from IAAF profile.

=== International championship results ===
Year	Competition	Venue	Position	Event	Time	Notes
Representing the United States
2019	IAAF World Athletics Championship	Doha, Qatar	43rd	200 m	20.92	
2019	NACAC U23 Championships	Querétaro, Mexico	6th	100 m	10.23	
2019	NACAC U23 Championships	Querétaro, Mexico	4th	200 m	20.79	
2019	The Match Europe v USA	Minsk, Belarus	7th	200 m	21.05	

=== National championship results ===
Year	Competition	Venue	Position	Event	Time	Wind (m/s)	Notes
Unattached
2015	USA Jr. Olympic Championships	Jacksonville, Florida	3rd	200 m	21.34	+0.9	
Representing the North Carolina A&T Aggies
2017	NCAA Division I Outdoor Championships	Eugene, Oregon	3rd	4 × 100 relay	38.57	n/a	
2018	NCAA Division I Indoor Championships	College Station, Texas	16th	200 m	20.99	n/a	
2018	NCAA Division I Outdoor Championships	Eugene, Oregon	5th	200 m	20.52	n/a	
2018	NCAA Division I Outdoor Championships	Eugene, Oregon	DNF	4 × 100 relay	—	n/a	Failed Exchange (Note: Rowe ran the 4 × 100 relay along with: Michael Bell, Joel Thompson & Michael Dickson.)
2019	USA Championships	Des Moines, Iowa	16th	100 m	10.41	-0.3	
2019	USA Championships	Des Moines, Iowa	7th	200 m	20.75	n/a	
2019	NCAA Division I Indoor Championships	Birmingham, Alabama	13th	200 m	20.37	n/a	
2019	NCAA Division I Championships	Austin, Texas	11th	100 m	10.06	+2.6	
2019	NCAA Division I Championships	Austin, Texas	13th	200 m	20.47	+0.7	
2019	NCAA Division I Championships	Austin, Texas	5th	4 × 100 relay	38.59	n/a	
