= The Match Europe v USA – Results =

These are full results of The Match Europe v USA, a track and field competition which took place in Minsk, Belarus, on 9 and 10 September 2019 at the Dinamo Stadium. There were 37 events in total, 18 for men, 18 for women, and a mixed relay.

== Men ==
=== 100 meters ===
9 September
Wind: -1.1 m/s

Rank	Lane	Name	Team	Time	Notes	Points
1	3	Mike Rodgers	United States	10.20		9
2	9	Christopher Belcher	United States	10.25		7
3	7	Demek Kemp	United States	10.28		6
4	4	Filippo Tortu	Europe (ITA)	10.29		5
5	6	Ojie Edoburun	Europe (GBR)	10.31		4
6	2	Christopher Garia	Europe (NED)	10.46		3
7	8	Patrick Domogala	Europe (GER)	10.57		2
	5	Isiah Young	United States	DQ	R162.8	0

=== 200 meters ===
10 September
Wind: 0.0 m/s

Rank	Lane	Name	Team	Time	Notes	Points
1	5	Ramil Guliyev	Europe (TUR)	20.16		9
2	7	Eseosa Desalu	Europe (ITA)	20.66		7
3	8	Kyree King	United States	20.83		6
4	5	Jamiel Trimble	United States	20.88		5
5	2	Remontay McClain	United States	20.98		4
6	9	Richard Kilty	Europe (GBR)	21.04		3
7	6	Rodney Rowe	United States	21.05		2
8	3	Marcus Lawler	Europe (IRL)	21.14		1

=== 400 meters ===
9 September

Rank	Lane	Name	Team	Time	Notes	Points
1	3	Michael Cherry	United States	45.13		9
2	5	Wil London	United States	45.39		7
3	4	Davide Re	Europe (ITA)	46.05		6
4	9	Tyrell Richard	United States	46.38		5
5	2	Karol Zalewski	Europe (POL)	46.57		4
6	6	Rabah Yousif	Europe (GBR)	46.76		3
7	8	Luka Janežič	Europe (SLO)	46.89		2
8	7	Nathan Strother	United States	47.15		1

=== 800 meters ===
10 September

Rank	Name	Team	Time	Notes	Points
1	Amel Tuka	Europe (BIH)	1:46.77		9
2	Adam Kszczot	Europe (POL)	1:46.89		7
3	Isaiah Harris	United States	1:46.94		6
4	Jamie Webb	Europe (GBR)	1:47.13		5
5	Brannon Kidder	United States	1:47.20		4
6	Harun Abda	United States	1:47.50		3
7	Kyle Langford	Europe (GBR)	1:47.85		2
8	Robert Downs	United States	1:49.06		1

=== 1500 meters ===
9 September

Rank	Name	Team	Time	Notes	Points
1	Josh Thompson	United States	3:38.88		9
2	Jake Wightman	Europe (GBR)	3:38.90		7
3	Ben Blankenship	United States	3:39.63		6
4	Charlie Grice	Europe (GBR)	3:39.85		5
5	Kevin López	Europe (ESP)	3:40.12		4
6	Alexis Miellet	Europe (FRA)	3:40.35		3
7	Willy Fink	United States	3:40.67		2
8	Eric Avila	United States	3:44.32		1

=== 3000 meters ===
10 September

Rank	Name	Team	Time	Notes	Points
1	Ben Blankenship	United States	7:57.48		9
2	Adel Mechaal	Europe (ESP)	7:57.55		7
3	Yemaneberhan Crippa	Europe (ITA)	7:58.11	SB	6
4	Willy Fink	United States	7:58.62		5
5	Riley Masters	United States	7:59.36		4
6	Hassan Mead	United States	7:59.90		3
7	Elzan Bibić	Europe (SRB)	8:00.31		2
8	Mike Foppen	Europe (NED)	8:01.72		1

=== 110 meters hurdles ===
10 September
Wind: +0.1 m/s

Rank	Lane	Name	Team	Time	Notes	Points
1	5	Orlando Ortega	Europe (ESP)	13.21		9
2	7	Sergey Shubenkov	Europe (ANA)	13.39		7
3	4	Freddie Crittenden	United States	13.43		6
4	3	Andy Pozzi	Europe (GBR)	13.59		5
5	6	Michael Dickson	United States	13.70		4
6	9	Vitali Parakhonka	Europe (BLR)	13.80		3
7	2	Robert Dunning	United States	13.86		2
8	8	Jarret Eaton	United States	15.54		1

=== 400 meters hurdles ===
10 September

Rank	Lane	Name	Team	Time	Notes	Points
1	6	Dave Kendziera	United States	48.99		9
2	4	Amere Lattin	United States	49.12		7
3	5	Ludvy Vaillant	Europe (FRA)	49.20		6
4	7	Patryk Dobek	Europe (POL)	49.41		5
5	9	Chris McAlister	Europe (GBR)	49.49		3.5
5	8	Khallifah Rosser	United States	49.49		3.5
7	3	Nick Smidt	Europe (NED)	50.29		2
8	2	Johnny Dutch	United States	52.96		1

=== 3000 meters steeplechase ===
9 September

Rank	Name	Team	Time	Notes	Points
1	Hillary Bor	United States	8:32.64		9
2	Stanley Kebenei	United States	8:33.65		7
3	Daniel Arce	Europe (ESP)	8:33.75		6
4	Ibrahim Ezzaydouni	Europe (ESP)	8:34.55		5
5	Zak Seddon	Europe (GBR)	8:36.36		4
6	Benard Keter	United States	8:44.63		3
7	Mason Ferlic	United States	9:04.35		2

=== 4 × 100 meters relay ===
9 September

Rank	Lane	Team	Competitors	Time	Notes	Points
1	7	United States 1	Demek Kemp, Mike Rodgers, Isiah Young, Christopher Belcher	38.26		9
2	4	Europe 2 (NED)	Joris van Gool, Taymir Burnet, Hensley Paulina, Churandy Martina	38.45		7
3	5	United States 2	Brandon Carnes, Cameron Burrell, Cordero Gray, Chris Royster	38.70		6
4	6	Europe 2 (GER)	Julian Reus, Joshua Hartmann, Roy Schmidt, Marvin Schulte	38.76		5

=== High jump ===
9 September

Rank	Name	Team	2.10	2.15	2.19	2.23	2.26	2.29	2.31	2.33	2.35	2.37	Result	Notes	Points
1	Maksim Nedasekau	Europe (BLR)	–	–	o	o	xo	xo	o	o	xo	xxx	2.35	WL	9
2	Ilya Ivanyuk	Europe (ANA)	–	o	o	–	xo	–	xxo	–	x		2.31		7
3	Jeron Robinson	United States	–	–	o	o	xo	o	x–	xx			2.29		6
4	Dzmitry Nabokau	Europe (BLR)	–	o	o	xxo	o	x–	x				2.26		5
5	Jonathan Wells	United States	–	o	xo	o	xo	xx					2.26	=PB	4
6	Shelby McEwen	United States	–	o	xo	o	xx–	x					2.23		3
7	Miguel Ángel Sancho	Europe (ESP)	o	o	o	xxx							2.19		2
8	JaCorian Duffield	United States	–	xo	xo	xxx							2.19		1

=== Pole vault ===
10 September

Rank	Name	Team	5.35	5.45	5.55	5.65	5.75	5.80	5.85	5.90	6.00	Result	Notes	Points
1	Armand Duplantis	Europe (SWE)	–	o	–	o	–	xo	o	xx–	x	5.85		9
2	Piotr Lisek	Europe (POL)	–	–	o	–	x–	o	x–	xx		5.80		7
3	Paweł Wojciechowski	Europe (POL)	–	o	–	x–	o	x–	xx			5.75		6
4	Konstadinos Filippidis	Europe (GRE)	o	–	o	xo	xo	xx				5.75	SB	5
5	Cole Walsh	United States	–	o	xo	o	x–	xx				5.65		4
6	KC Lightfoot	United States	o	–	xxx							5.35		3
	Scott Houston	United States	xxx									NM		0
	Carson Waters	United States	xxx									NM		0

=== Long jump ===
9 September

Rank	Name	Team	#1	#2	#3	#4	#5	#6	Result	Notes	Points
1	Damarcus Simpson	United States	8.17	8.13	x	7.87	7.92	8.17	8.17	PB	9
2	Miltiadis Tentoglou	Europe (GRE)	x	8.10	8.17	7.00	x	7.80	8.17		7
3	Eusebio Cáceres	Europe (ESP)	x	7.96	8.17	7.94	x	x	8.17		6
4	Steffin McCarter	United States	x	x	7.87	x	x	x	7.87		5
5	Thobias Montler	Europe (SWE)	7.77	7.78	7.86	x	x		7.86		4
6	Héctor Santos	Europe (ESP)	7.63	7.73	7.85	7.78			7.85		3
7	Jarvis Gotch	United States	x	7.57	7.69				7.69		2
8	Keandre Bates	United States	x	x	7.40				7.40		1

=== Triple jump ===
10 September

Rank	Name	Team	#1	#2	#3	#4	#5	#6	Result	Notes	Points
1	Chris Benard	United States	16.48	17.01	16.81	15.89	x	16.09	17.01	SB	9
2	Ben Williams	Europe (GBR)	x	16.71	16.54	16.44	x	14.35	16.71	SB	7
3	Keandre Bates	United States	16.70	16.20	x	x	16.16	x	16.70		6
4	Necati Er	Europe (TUR)	16.27	16.47	16.57	14.70	16.32	13.92	16.57		5
5	Donald Scott	United States	x	16.47	x	16.45	16.10		16.47		4
6	Chris Carter	United States	x	16.45	15.30	15.91			16.45		3
7	Nazim Babayev	Europe (AZE)	16.27	16.10	16.11				16.27		2
	Jean-Marc Pontvianne	Europe (FRA)	x	x	x				NM		0

=== Shot put ===
9 September

Rank	Name	Team	#1	#2	#3	#4	#5	#6	Result	Notes	Points
1	Darrell Hill	United States	22.13	22.35	21.55	x	x	x	22.35	SB	9
2	Konrad Bukowiecki	Europe (POL)	21.70	21.85	21.92	20.75	x	x	21.92		7
3	Filip Mihaljević	Europe (CRO)	20.43	21.04	21.60	x	x	x	21.60		6
4	Mesud Pezer	Europe (BIH)	20.99	x	x	x	20.39	20.45	20.99		5
5	Payton Otterdahl	United States	20.70	20.35	x	20.72	x		20.72		4
6	Josh Awotunde	United States	20.30	20.39	20.66	x			20.66		3
7	Jonathan Jones	United States	20.10	x	20.42				20.42		2
8	Bob Bertemes	Europe (LUX)	x	20.21	x				20.21		1

=== Discus throw ===
10 September

Rank	Name	Team	#1	#2	#3	#4	#5	#6	Result	Notes	Points
1	Lukas Weißhaidinger	Europe (AUT)	65.25	65.36	67.22	x	65.45	x	67.22		9
2	Piotr Małachowski	Europe (POL)	x	57.09	58.28	63.47	64.89	63.32	64.89		7
3	Ola Stunes Isene	Europe (NOR)	63.99	x	59.98	62.95	62.95	x	63.99		6
4	Sam Mattis	United States	x	61.97	x	63.03	63.66	60.73	63.66		5
5	Brian Williams	United States	62.81	x	x	60.28	x		62.81		4
6	Lois Maikel Martínez	Europe (ESP)	58.01	x	58.89	x			58.89		3
7	Kord Ferguson	United States	x	56.05	56.71				56.71		2
	Luke Vaughn	United States							NM		0

=== Hammer throw ===
9 September

Rank	Name	Team	#1	#2	#3	#4	#5	#6	Result	Notes	Points
1	Paweł Fajdek	Europe (POL)	79.83	x	80.71	x	x	x	80.71		9
2	Wojciech Nowicki	Europe (POL)	75.86	78.33	77.70	77.47	76.83	76.68	78.33		7
3	Nick Miller	Europe (GBR)	x	x	73.65	74.91	77.06	77.89	77.89		6
4	Rudy Winkler	United States	70.39	75.12	70.01	71.24	x	71.05	75.12		5
5	Daniel Haugh	United States	73.36	74.14	x	x	x		74.14		4
6	Denis Lukyanov	Europe (ANA)	70.74	73.34	72.88	x			73.34		3
7	Sean Donnelly	United States	72.82	71.52	x				72.82		2
8	Payton Otterdahl	United States	58.66	–	–				58.66		1

=== Javelin throw ===
10 September

Rank	Name	Team	#1	#2	#3	#4	#5	#6	Result	Notes	Points
1	Johannes Vetter	Europe (GER)	88.03	87.68	90.03	84.83	88.31	x	90.03	SB	9
2	Magnus Kirt	Europe (EST)	85.38	x	80.23	83.43	83.92	88.91	88.91		7
3	Edis Matusevičius	Europe (LTU)	83.54	80.15	79.67	79.82	79.80	76.56	83.54		6
4	Michael Shuey	United States	x	83.21	x	77.62	78.23	x	83.21	PB	5
5	Thomas Röhler	Europe (GER)	x	79.45	x	82.31	78.39		82.31		4
6	Riley Dolezal	United States	72.51	76.98	x	73.76			76.98		3
7	Tim Glover	United States	75.57	74.96	74.12				75.57		2
8	Curtis Thompson	United States	x	68.60	72.01				72.01		1

== Women ==
=== 100 meters ===
9 September
Wind: -0.8 m/s

Rank	Lane	Name	Team	Time	Notes	Points
1	7	Daryll Neita	Europe (GBR)	11.29		9
2	4	Dezerea Bryant	United States	11.30		7
3	8	Morolake Akinosun	United States	11.39		6
4	5	Imani Lansiquot	Europe (GBR)	11.49		5
5	2	Ashley Henderson	United States	11.53		4
6	6	Caitland Smith	United States	11.59		3
7	9	Naomi Sedney	Europe (NED)	11.77		2
8	3	Paula Sevilla	Europe (ESP)	11.82		1

=== 200 meters ===
10 September
Wind: -0.1 m/s

Rank	Lane	Name	Team	Time	Notes	Points
1	5	Brittany Brown	United States	22.61		9
2	4	Beth Dobbin	Europe (GBR)	22.92		7
3	7	Kyra Jefferson	United States	22.99		6
4	6	Ashleigh Nelson	Europe (GBR)	23.22		5
5	2	Jessica-Bianca Wessolly	Europe (GER)	23.24		4
6	8	Krystsina Tsimanouskaya	Europe (BLR)	23.31		3
7	9	A'Keyla Mitchell	United States	23.58		2
8	3	Courtne Davis	United States	23.92		1

=== 400 meters ===
9 September

Rank	Lane	Name	Team	Time	Notes	Points
1	4	Wadeline Jonathas	United States	51.01		9
2	8	Allyson Felix	United States	51.36	SB	7
3	7	Iga Baumgart-Witan	Europe (POL)	51.52		6
4	9	Jodie Williams	Europe (GBR)	51.83		5
5	6	Courtney Okolo	United States	52.20		4
6	5	Justyna Święty-Ersetic	Europe (POL)	52.35		3
7	3	Polina Miller	Europe (ANA)	52.79		2
8	2	Athing Mu	United States	54.34		1

=== 800 meters ===
9 September

Rank	Name	Team	Time	Notes	Points
1	Alexandra Bell	Europe (GBR)	2:04.81		9
2	Olha Lyakhova	Europe (UKR)	2:04.90		7
3	Ce’Aira Brown	United States	2:05.38		6
4	Gabriela Gajanová	Europe (SVK)	2:05.43		5
5	Olivia Baker	United States	2:05.82		4
6	Yuliya Karol	Europe (BLR)	2:05.82		3
7	Athing Mu	United States	2:06.68		2
8	Kenyetta Iyevbele	United States	2:07.01		1

=== 1500 meters ===
10 September

Rank	Name	Team	Time	Notes	Points
1	Kate Grace	United States	4:02.49	PB	9
2	Shannon Osika	United States	4:04.92		7
3	Eilish McColgan	Europe (GBR)	4:05.58		6
4	Elise Cranny	United States	4:05.83	PB	5
5	Melissa Courtney	Europe (GBR)	4:06.78		4
6	Daryia Barysevich	Europe (BLR)	4:07.03		3
7	Sofia Ennaoui	Europe (POL)	4:09.18		2
8	Katie Mackey	United States	4:12.88		1

=== 3000 meters ===
9 September

Rank	Name	Team	Time	Notes	Points
1	Elise Cranny	United States	9:00.70		9
2	Rachel Schneider	United States	9:00.77		7
3	Eilish McColgan	Europe (GBR)	9:01.03		6
4	Shannon Rowbury	United States	9:01.12	SB	5
5	Vanessa Fraser	United States	9:02.34		4
6	Yolanda Ngarambe	Europe (SWE)	9:06.52		3
7	Katsiaryna Karneyenka	Europe (BLR)	9:13.79		2

=== 100 meters hurdles ===
10 September
Wind: +0.1 m/s

Rank	Lane	Name	Team	Time	Notes	Points
1	7	Sharika Nelvis	United States	12.80		9
2	2	Karolina Kołeczek	Europe (POL)	12.86		7
3	4	Elvira Herman	Europe (BLR)	12.92		6
4	5	Queen Claye	United States	12.95		5
5	6	Annimari Korte	Europe (FIN)	12.98		4
6	8	Luminosa Bogliolo	Europe (ITA)	13.05		3
7	3	Tiffani McReynolds	United States	13.13		2
8	9	Kaila Barber	United States	13.64		1

=== 400 meters hurdles ===
10 September

Rank	Lane	Name	Team	Time	Notes	Points
1	6	Anna Ryzhykova	Europe (UKR)	55.32		9
2	4	Léa Sprunger	Europe (SUI)	55.46		7
3	2	Meghan Beesley	Europe (GBR)	55.49		6
4	3	Kiah Seymour	United States	55.82		5
5	8	Ayomide Folorunso	Europe (ITA)	56.80		4
6	9	Deonca Bookman	United States	58.75		3
7	7	Kaila Barber	United States	59.31		2
8	5	Ashley Spencer	United States	1:41.14		1

=== 3000 meters steeplechase ===
9 September

Rank	Name	Team	Time	Notes	Points
1	Mel Lawrence	United States	9:33.24		9
2	Irene Sánchez	Europe (ESP)	9:38.47		7
3	Viktória Wagner-Gyürkés	Europe (HUN)	9:42.68		6
4	Camilla Richardsson	Europe (FIN)	9:44.38		5
5	Elizabeth Bird	Europe (GBR)	9:47.62		4
6	Marisa Howard	United States	9:47.67		3
7	Courtney Barnes	United States	10:06.66		2
8	Caroline Austin	United States	10:14.43		1

=== 4 × 100 meters relay ===
9 September

Rank	Lane	Team	Competitors	Time	Notes	Points
1	6	United States 1	Dezerea Bryant, Caitland Smith, Morolake Akinosun, Ashley Henderson	43.36		9
2	4	United States 2	Courtne Davis, Kortnei Johnson, Kiara Parker, Kyra Jefferson	43.66		7
3	5	Europe 1 (NED)	Bowien Jansen, Nargélis Statia Pieter, Eefje Boons, Naomi Sedney	43.82		6
4	7	Europe 2 (ESP)	Carmen Marco, Jaël Bestué, Paula Sevilla, Cristina Lara	44.37		5

=== High jump ===
10 September

Rank	Name	Team	1.78	1.83	1.87	1.90	1.93	1.96	1.98	2.00	2.02	2.04	Result	Notes	Points
1	Yuliya Levchenko	Europe (UKR)	–	–	o	o	o	o	o	o	o	xxx	2.02	NU23R	9
2	Iryna Herashchenko	Europe (UKR)	–	o	o	o	o	o	xo	x			1.98		7
3	Mariya Lasitskene	Europe (ANA)	–	–	o	–	o	x–	xo	x–	x–	x	1.98		6
4	Inika McPherson	United States	–	–	xo	o	xxx						1.90		5
5	Amina Smith	United States	o	o	xxo	o	xxx						1.90	SB	4
6	Karyna Demidik	Europe (BLR)	–	o	o	x–	xx						1.87		3
7	Jelena Rowe	United States	xo	o	xo	xxx							1.87		2
8	Ty Butts	United States	–	o	xxx								1.83		1

=== Pole vault ===
9 September

Rank	Name	Team	4.40	4.50	4.60	4.70	4.75	4.80	4.85	Result	Notes	Points
1	Anzhelika Sidorova	Europe (ANA)	–	–	o	o	–	xo	xo	4.85		9
2	Ekaterini Stefanidi	Europe (GRE)	–	–	o	o	xx–	x		4.70		7
3	Katie Nageotte	United States	–	o	–	xo	x–	xx		4.70		6
4	Angelica Bengtsson	Europe (SWE)	xo	–	o	xxo	–	xx		4.70		5
5	Iryna Zhuk	Europe (BLR)	o	–	xxo	–	xxx			4.60		4
6	Emily Grove	United States	xxo	xxx						4.40		3
	Dailis Caballero	United States	xxx							NM		0

=== Long jump ===
10 September

Rank	Name	Team	#1	#2	#3	#4	#5	#6	Result	Notes	Points
1	Nastassia Mironchyk-Ivanova	Europe (BLR)	6.55	6.56	6.74	6.57	6.55	6.52	6.74		9
2	Maryna Bekh-Romanchuk	Europe (UKR)	x	6.60	6.73	x	x	6.45	6.73		7
3	Brittney Reese	United States	6.59	6.71	x	6.69	x	6.63	6.71		6
4	Alina Rotaru	Europe (ROM)	6.41	x	6.48	x	6.52	6.48	6.52		5
5	Quanesha Burks	United States	6.41	6.48	5.79	6.43	6.35		6.48		4
6	Jasmine Todd	United States	x	5.98	6.42	6.21			6.42		3
7	Sha'Keela Saunders	United States	6.25	6.29	6.39				6.39		2
	Florentina Costina Iusco	Europe (ROM)	x	x	x				NM		0

=== Triple jump ===
9 September

Rank	Name	Team	#1	#2	#3	#4	#5	#6	Result	Notes	Points
1	Tori Franklin	United States	13.94	13.85	14.15	14.36	14.25	13.91	14.36		9
2	Patrícia Mamona	Europe (POR)	14.21	x	14.02	14.15	14.13	x	14.21		7
3	Dovilė Kilty	Europe (LTU)	13.98	13.75	x	14.08	13.82	13.92	14.08		6
4	Kristin Gierisch	Europe (GER)	13.62	13.64	13.80	13.77	x	x	13.80		5
5	Imani Oliver	United States	13.45	13.75	x	13.48	13.55		13.75		4
6	Lynnika Pitts	United States	13.71	13.30	13.51	13.55			13.71	SB	3
7	Diana Zagainova	Europe (LTU)	13.50	13.55	13.47				13.55		2
8	Tiffany Flynn	United States	12.82	x	13.21				13.21		1

=== Shot put ===
10 September

Rank	Name	Team	#1	#2	#3	#4	#5	#6	Result	Notes	Points
1	Maggie Ewen	United States	22.13	22.35	21.55	x	x	x	19.47	PB	9
2	Fanny Roos	Europe (SWE)	16.78	18.79	18.41	18.48	x	19.06	19.06	NR	7
3	Anita Márton	Europe (HUN)	18.25	17.98	18.14	18.95	x	x	18.95		6
4	Chase Ealey	United States	18.09	x	18.65	18.43	18.83	18.54	18.83		5
5	Aliona Dubitskaya	Europe (BLR)	17.31	18.50	18.57	18.46	x		18.57		4
6	Paulina Guba	Europe (POL)	17.97	18.06	18.50	17.85			18.50		3
7	Michelle Carter	United States	17.94	x	17.82				18.83		2
8	Jeneva Stevens	United States	16.81	16.79	x				16.81		1

=== Discus throw ===
9 September

Rank	Name	Team	#1	#2	#3	#4	#5	#6	Result	Notes	Points
1	Sandra Perković	Europe (CRO)	x	62.69	61.50	58.51	63.96	67.65	67.65		9
2	Laulauga Tausaga-Collins	United States	54.43	63.03	x	61.06	63.71	x	63.71	PB	7
3	Valarie Allman	United States	x	60.74	62.44	x	61.58	61.95	62.44		6
4	Irina Rodrigues	Europe (POR)	59.83	56.12	60.87	57.87	60.25	x	60.87		5
5	Marike Steinacker	Europe (GER)	56.60	60.50	59.91	60.85	58.72		60.85		4
6	Marija Tolj	Europe (CRO)	x	60.37	x	58.01			60.37		3
7	Kelsey Card	United States	55.10	60.35	x				60.35		2
8	Whitney Ashley	United States	x	60.00	60.00				60.00		1

=== Hammer throw ===
10 September

Rank	Name	Team	#1	#2	#3	#4	#5	#6	Result	Notes	Points
1	Joanna Fiodorow	Europe (POL)	71.13	71.58	x	72.08	73.92	74.34	74.34		9
2	Hanna Malyshik	Europe (BLR)	68.99	72.70	72.66	x	x	x	72.70		7
3	Brooke Andersen	United States	x	70.19	x	70.43	69.90	72.59	72.59		6
4	Janee' Kassanavoid	United States	x	68.80	71.26	68.09	69.09	68.93	71.26		5
5	Zalina Petrivskaya	Europe (MDA)	67.68	x	69.21	x	68.59		69.21		4
6	Réka Gyurátz	Europe (HUN)	67.57	66.00	x	68.28			68.28		3
7	Janeah Stewart	United States	x	x	66.40				66.40		2
	Maggie Ewen	United States	x	x	x				NM		0

=== Javelin throw ===
9 September

Rank	Name	Team	#1	#2	#3	#4	#5	#6	Result	Notes	Points
1	Kara Winger	United States	59.20	62.31	60.36	60.92	61.34	64.63	64.63		9
2	Tatsiana Khaladovich	Europe (BLR)	63.33	x	64.41	60.11	63.73	63.39	64.41		7
3	Alexie Alaïs	Europe (FRA)	57.48	56.81	60.86	55.92	60.17	55.43	60.86		6
4	Līna Mūze	Europe (LAT)	58.52	59.71	x	x	x	x	59.71		5
5	Ariana Ince	United States	58.84	x	57.38	56.38	x		58.84		4
6	Martina Ratej	Europe (SLO)	54.55	x	58.64	x			58.64		3
7	Maggie Malone	United States	x	54.79	52.33				54.79		2
8	Avione Allgood	United States	51.48	x	x				51.48		1

== Mixed ==
=== Medley relay 200+200+400+800 ===
10 September

Rank	Team	Competitors	Time	Notes	Points
1	Europe 1	Patrick Domogala (GER), Jessica-Bianca Wessolly (GER), Iga Baumgart-Witan (POL), Amel Tuka (BIH)	3:21.13		9
2	United States 1	Remontay McClain, Kiara Parker, Allyson Felix, Isaiah Harris	3:21.21		7
3	United States 2	Jamiel Trimble, Kyra Jefferson, Courtney Okolo, Brannon Kidder	3:21.47		6
4	Europe 2	Karol Zalewski (POL), Lara Gómez (ESP), Jodie Williams (GBR), Charlie Grice (GBR)	3:24.60		5
