= The Match Europe v USA =

- Dates: 9–10 September 2019
- Host city: Minsk, Belarus
- Venue: Dinamo Stadium
- Events: 37
- Participation: ~300 athletes
- Europe 724½ – 601½ (United States) USA; Team Europe wins the Match.

The Match Europe v USA was an international two-day outdoor track and field competition between the United States and Europe. It took place from 9–10 September 2019 in Minsk, Belarus, three weeks prior to the 2019 World Athletics Championships in Doha, Qatar, a few days after the conclusion of the 2019 Diamond League, and three months after the 2019 European Games.

Team Europe won the Match, defeating Team USA by 724½ to 601½.

== Creation of the Match ==
The match was agreed between European Athletics and USA Track & Field in December 2018 and marked the first international match between the two since the 1960s. The competition followed the successful creation of the Athletics World Cup in 2018, which included the United States and several European nations. Athletes from the United States and Europe also compete in the quadrennial IAAF Continental Cup, though American athletes are part of a combined Americas team rather than a national one. Minsk also played host to the 2019 European Games that year, the athletics portion of which was a national team matchplay competition held in the new DNA Athletics format.

== The program ==
=== Events ===
The event programme consisted of 37 events, and includes six individual track running events, three obstacle events, four jumping events, four throwing events, and a sprint relay event for each sex. There is also a 1600 metres mixed-sex sprint medley relay with four athletes running 200, 200, 400 and 800 metres, similar to a mixed 4 × 400 metres relay which will be introduced at the 2020 Summer Olympics.

Track events

Running

- 100 metres, 200 metres, 400 metres, 800 metres, 1500 metres, 3000 metres

Obstacle events

- 100 metres hurdles (women only), 110 metres hurdles (men only), 400 metres hurdles, 3000 metres steeplechase

Relay events

- 4 × 100 metres relay, 1600 metres sprint medley relay (mixed)

Field events

Jumping events

- Pole vault, high jump, long jump, triple jump

Throwing events

- Shot put, discus throw, javelin throw, hammer throw

Special match rules applied to the field events. For the six Horizontal field events (all four throwing events, the long and triple jumps), there were three initial attempts in each event. Following this, the top six athletes from these trials advanced to the final three rounds. At each subsequent round, the lowest placing athlete, based on all attempts thus far in the competition, was eliminated. In the vertical jumps (high jump and pole vault) each competitor was limited to three attempts at any specific height and eight attempts in total.

=== Scoring ===
Each team was allowed to field 4 athletes in each individual event, and two teams of four in each relay. The winner of each individual event and each relay scored 9 points, the second 7 points, the third score 6, and so on. The highest score either team could achieve in a single event was therefore 27 points, and the lowest (barring disqualification, failure to finish or record a mark) 10 (or in relays, 16 and 11 respectively).

Across the competition, a theoretical high score of 966 points was available, and a theoretical low score, ignoring disqualifications, DNFs and no marks, of 373. However, the match would be won once either team achieves over half of all available points - the winning post for the Match before it commenced was therefore 670 points. Following withdrawals and 'no marks' on day one of the Match, the winning post was recalculated as 662 points. Europe secured victory when they reached a 664½–560½ lead. The final result was 724½–601½.

Scoring scheme for The Match USA v Europe
| Position | Points | Position | Points |
| 1st | 9 | 5th | 4 |
| 2nd | 7 | 6th | 3 |
| 3rd | 6 | 7th | 2 |
| 4th | 5 | 8th | 1 |
* 0 points are awarded in the event of a DQ, DNF or NM.

3½ points was awarded for dead heat for 5th place in 400m hurdles men.

=== Prize money ===
The organiser of the event will award prize money to the competitors. For relay events, the winning team will receive €6,000, the runners-up €4,000, and the third-placers €2,000. The prize money structure for individual events is as follows:

1. €7,000
2. €5,000
3. €4,000
4. €3,000
5. €2,000
6. €1,000
7. €500
8. €500

== Results ==
=== Men ===
| Event | First | | Second | | Third | |
|---|---|---|---|---|---|---|
| 100 metres | Mike Rodgers; United States | 10.20 | Christopher Belcher; United States | 10.25 | Demek Kemp; United States | 10.25 |
| 200 metres | Ramil Guliyev; Europe | 20.16 | Eseosa Desalu; Europe | 20.66 | Kyree King; United States | 20.83 |
| 400 metres | Michael Cherry; United States | 45.13 | Wilbert London; United States | 45.39 | Davide Re; Europe | 46.05 |
| 800 metres | Amel Tuka; Europe | 1:46.77 | Adam Kszczot; Europe | 1:46.89 | Isaiah Harris; United States | 1:46.94 |
| 1500 metres | Josh Thompson; United States | 3:38.88 | Jake Wightman; Europe | 3:38.90 | Ben Blankenship; United States | 3:39.63 |
| 3000 metres | Ben Blankenship; United States | 7:57.48 | Adel Mechaal; Europe | 7:57.55 | Yemaneberhan Crippa; Europe | 7:58.11 |
| 110 metres hurdles | Orlando Ortega; Europe | 13.21 | Sergey Shubenkov; Europe | 13.39 | Freddie Crittenden; United States | 13.43 |
| 400 metres hurdles | Dave Kendziera; United States | 48.99 | Amere Lattin; United States | 49.12 | Ludvy Vaillant; Europe | 49.20 |
| 3000 metres steeplechase | Hillary Bor; United States | 8:32.64 | Stanley Kebenei; United States | 8:33.65 | Daniel Arce; Europe | 8:33.75 |
| 4 × 100 metres relay | United States 1 Demek Kemp; Mike Rodgers; Isaiah Young; Christopher Belcher | 38.26 | Europe 1 Joris van Gool; Taymir Burnet; Hensley Paulina; Churandy Martina | 38.45 | United States 2 Brandon Carnes; Cameron Burrell; Cordero Gray; Chris Royster | 38.70 |
| High jump | Maksim Nedasekau; Europe | 2.35 WL | Ilya Ivanyuk; Europe | 2.31 | Jeron Robinson; United States | 2.29 |
| Pole vault | Armand Duplantis; Europe | 5.85 | Piotr Lisek; Europe | 5.80 | Paweł Wojciechowski; Europe | 5.75 |
| Long jump | Damarcus Simpson; United States | 8.17 | Miltiadis Tentoglou; Europe | 8.17 | Eusebio Cáceres; Europe | 8.17 |
| Long jump | * Placings decided on countback | | | | | |
| Triple jump | Chris Benard; United States | 17.01 | Ben Williams; Europe | 16.71 | KeAndre Bates; United States | 16.70 |
| Shot put | Darrell Hill; United States | 22.35 | Konrad Bukowiecki; Europe | 21.92 | Filip Mihaljević; Europe | 21.60 |
| Discus throw | Lukas Weißhaidinger; Europe | 67.22 | Piotr Małachowski; Europe | 64.89 | Ola Stunes Isene; Europe | 63.99 |
| Hammer throw | Paweł Fajdek; Europe | 80.71 | Wojciech Nowicki; Europe | 78.33 | Nick Miller; Europe | 77.89 |
| Javelin throw | Johannes Vetter; Europe | 90.03 | Magnus Kirt; Europe | 88.91 | Edis Matusevičius; Europe | 83.54 |

=== Women ===
| Event | First | | Second | | Third | |
|---|---|---|---|---|---|---|
| 100 metres | Daryll Neita; Europe | 11.29 | Dezerea Bryant; United States | 11.30 | Morolake Akinosun; United States | 11.39 |
| 200 metres | Brittany Brown; United States | 22.61 | Beth Dobbin; Europe | 22.92 | Kyra Jefferson; United States | 22.99 |
| 400 metres | Wadeline Jonathas; United States | 51.01 | Allyson Felix; United States | 51.36 | Iga Baumgart-Witan; Europe | 51.52 |
| 800 metres | Alexandra Bell; Europe | 2:04.81 | Olha Lyakhova; Europe | 2:04.90 | Ce'Aira Brown; United States | 2:05.38 |
| 1500 metres | Kate Grace; United States | 4:02.49 | Shannon Osika; United States | 4:04.92 | Eilish McColgan; Europe | 4:05.58 |
| 3000 metres | Elise Cranny; United States | 9:00.70 | Rachel Schneider; United States | 9:00.77 | Eilish McColgan; Europe | 9:01.03 |
| 3000 metres steeplechase | Mel Lawrence; United States | 9:33.24 | Irene Sánchez-Escribano; Europe | 9:38.47 | Viktória Wagner-Gyürkés; Europe | 9:42.68 |
| 100 metres hurdles | Sharika Nelvis; United States | 12.80 | Karolina Kołeczek; Europe | 12.86 | Elvira Herman; Europe | 12.92 |
| 400 metres hurdles | Hanna Ryzhykova; Europe | 55.32 | Léa Sprunger; Europe | 55.46 | Meghan Beesley; Europe | 55.49 |
| 4 × 100 metres relay | United States 1 Dezerea Bryant; Morolake Akinosun; Caitland Smith; Ashley Henderson | 43.36 | United States 2 Courtne Davis; Kiara Parker; Kortnei Johnson; Kyra Jefferson | 43.66 | Europe 1 Bowien Jansen; Nargelis Statia Pieter; Eefje Boons; Naomi Sedney | 43.82 |
| High jump | Yuliya Levchenko; Europe | 2.02 | Iryna Herashchenko; Europe | 1.98 | Mariya Lasitskene; Europe | 1.98 |
| Pole vault | Anzhelika Sidorova; Europe | 4.85 | Katerina Stefanidi; Europe | 4.70 | Katie Nageotte; United States | 4.70 |
| Long jump | Nastassia Mironchyk-Ivanova; Europe | 6.74 | Maryna Bekh-Romanchuk; Europe | 6.73 | Brittney Reese; United States | 6.71 |
| Triple jump | Tori Franklin; United States | 14.36 | Patrícia Mamona; Europe | 14.21 | Dovile Kilty; Europe | 14.08 |
| Shot put | Maggie Ewen; United States | 19.47 | Fanny Roos; Europe | 19.06 | Anita Márton; Europe | 18.95 |
| Discus throw | Sandra Perković; Europe | 67.65 | Laulauga Tausaga-Collins; United States | 63.71 | Valarie Allman; United States | 62.44 |
| Hammer throw | Joanna Fiodorow; Europe | 74.34 | Hanna Malyshik; Europe | 72.70 | Brooke Andersen; United States | 72.59 |
| Javelin throw | Kara Winger; United States | 64.63 | Tatsiana Khaladovich; Europe | 64.41 | Alexie Alaïs; Europe | 60.86 |

=== Mixed ===
| Event | First | | Second | | Third | |
|---|---|---|---|---|---|---|
| 1600 metres medley relay | Europe 1 Patrick Domogala; Jessica-Bianca Wessolly; Iga Baumgart-Witan; Amel Tuka | 3:21.13 | United States 1 Remontay McClain; Kiara Parker; Allyson Felix; Isaiah Harris | 3:21.21 | United States 2 Jamiel Trimble; Kyra Jefferson; Courtney Okolo; Brannon Kidder | 3:21.47 |

=== Final scores ===
| Teams | | 100 m | 200 m | 400 m | 800 m | 1500 m | 3000 m | 3000m s | 1/110m h | 400 m h | 4 x 100 m | 1600m relay | HJ | LJ | TJ | PV | SP | DT | HT | JT | Total Score |
|---|---|---|---|---|---|---|---|---|---|---|---|---|---|---|---|---|---|---|---|---|---|
| Team Europe | M | 14 | 20 | 15 | 23 | 19 | 16 | 21 | 24 | 16½ | 12 | 14 | 25 | 20 | 14 | 27 | 19 | 25 | 25 | 26 | 724½ PTS |
| Team Europe | W | 17 | 19 | 16 | 24 | 14 | 11 | 22 | 20 | 26 | 11 | 14 | 25 | 21 | 20 | 24 | 20 | 21 | 23 | 21 | 724½ PTS |
| Team USA (United States) | M | 22 | 17 | 22 | 14 | 18 | 21 | 21 | 13 | 20½ | 15 | 13 | 12 | 17 | 22 | 7 | 18 | 11 | 12 | 11 | 601½ PTS |
| Team USA (United States) | W | 20 | 18 | 21 | 13 | 23 | 25 | 15 | 17 | 11 | 16 | 13 | 12 | 15 | 17 | 9 | 17 | 16 | 13 | 16 | 601½ PTS |
TEAM EUROPE (Europe) WINS THE MATCH 724½ – 601½

Points from each placement
| | | 1st | 2nd | 3rd | 4th | 5th | 6th | 7th | 8th | Total points |
|---|---|---|---|---|---|---|---|---|---|---|
| Points for placement | | 9 | 7 | 6 | 5 | 4 | 3 | 2 | 1 | |
| Team Europe | Events | 17 | 26 | 21 | 23 | 16 | 19 | 12 | 4 | 724½ |
| Team Europe | Points | 153 | 182 | 126 | 115 | 63½ | 57 | 24 | 4 | 724½ |
| Team USA (United States) | Events | 20 | 11 | 16 | 14 | 19 | 14 | 20 | 21 | 601½ |
| Team USA (United States) | Points | 180 | 77 | 96 | 70 | 75½ | 42 | 40 | 21 | 601½ |

- 17 events were won by Team Europe; Team USA won 20.
- Team Europe achieved 64 podium positions; Team USA achieved 47.
