= 2022 NACAC Championships =

IV NACAC Championships
- Dates: August 19–21, 2022
- Host city: Freeport, Bahamas (The Bahamas)
- Venue: Grand Bahama Sports Complex
- Level: Senior
- Events: 43
- Participation: 329 athletes from 26 nations

The 2022 North American, Central American and Caribbean Championships were a regional track and field competition held at Grand Bahama Sports Complex in Freeport, Bahamas, from August 19–21, 2022. It was the fourth edition of a senior track and field championship for the NACAC region, held four years after the 2018 NACAC Championships.

== Medal summary ==
=== Men ===
Event	Gold		Silver		Bronze	
100 metres (wind: -0.4 m/s)	Ackeem Blake; Jamaica	9.98 CR	Kyree King; United States	10.08	Brandon Carnes; United States	10.12
200 metres (wind: +0.6 m/s)	Andrew Hudson; Jamaica	19.87 CR	Kyree King; United States	20.00	Josephus Lyles; United States	20.18
400 metres	Christopher Taylor; Jamaica	44.63 CR	Nathon Allen; Jamaica	45.04	Bryce Deadmon; United States	45.06
800 metres	Jonah Koech; United States	1:45.87	Handal Roban; Saint Vincent and the Grenadines	1:47.03	Brannon Kidder; United States	1:47.63
1500 metres	Eric Holt; United States	3:37.62 CR	Josh Thompson; United States	3:37.88	Charles Philibert-Thiboutot; Canada	3:37.91
5000 metres	Woody Kincaid; United States	14:48.58	Thomas Fafard; Canada	14:49.41	Kieran Lumb; Canada	14:50.06
10,000 metres	Sean McGorty; United States	29:23.77 CR	Dillon Maggard; United States	29:33.57	Andrew Alexander; Canada	29:33.73
110 metres hurdles (wind: +0.3 m/s)	Freddie Crittenden; United States	13.00 CR	Jamal Britt; United States	13.08	Orlando Bennett; Jamaica	13.18
400 metres hurdles	Kyron McMaster; British Virgin Islands	47.34 CR	Khallifah Rosser; United States	47.59	CJ Allen; United States	48.23
3000 metres steeplechase	Evan Jager; United States	8:22.55 CR	Duncan Hamilton; United States	8:31.19	Jean-Simon Desgagnés; Canada	8:33.25
4 × 100 metres relay	Lawrence Johnson; Brandon Carnes; Isiah Young; Kyree King; United States	38.29	Jerod Elcock; Eric Harrison Jr. Asa Guevara; Kyle Greaux; Trinidad and Tobago	38.931	Ackeem Blake; Andrew Hudson; Kadrian Goldson; Jazeel Murphy; Jamaica	38.933
4 × 400 metres relay	Quincy Hall; Ismail Turner; Khallifah Rosser; Bryce Deadmon; United States	3:01.79	Demish Gaye; Karayme Bartley; Javon Francis; Christopher Taylor; Jamaica	3:05.47	Kinard Rolle; Alonzo Russell; Shakeem Smith; Wendell Miller; Bahamas	3:06.21
20,000 metres walk	José Ortiz; Guatemala	1:26:21.08 CR	Evan Dunfee; Canada	1:27:17.91	Érick Barrondo; Guatemala	1:28:32.19
High jump	Luis Enrique Zayas; Cuba Django Lovett; Canada	2.25	not awarded		Donald Thomas; Bahamas	2.25
Pole vault	Eduardo Nápoles; Cuba	5.25 m	Luke Winder; United States	5.05 m	Only two finishers	—N/a
Long jump	William Williams; United States	7.89 m -1.6	Tajay Gayle; Jamaica	7.81 m -1.6	Shawn-D Thompson; Jamaica	7.75 m +0.0
Triple jump	Chris Benard; United States	16.40 m -2.1	Jah-Nhai Perinchief; Bermuda	15.89 m -3.2	Taeco O'Garro; Antigua and Barbuda	15.70 m -0.4
Shot put	Roger Steen; United States	20.78 m	Adrian Piperi; United States	20.76 m	O'Dayne Richards; Jamaica	20.05 m
Discus throw	Traves Smikle; Jamaica	62.89 m	Fedrick Dacres; Jamaica	62.79 m	Mario Díaz; Cuba	62.13 m
Hammer throw	Rudy Winkler; United States	78.29 m CR	Daniel Haugh; United States	76.38 m	Rowan Hamilton; Canada	74.36 m
Javelin throw	Curtis Thompson; United States	84.32 m CR	Keshorn Walcott; Trinidad and Tobago	83.94 m	Ethan Dabbs; United States	81.43 m

=== Women ===
Event	Gold		Silver		Bronze	
100 metres (wind: -0.1 m/s)	Shericka Jackson; Jamaica	10.83 CR	Celera Barnes; United States	11.10	Natasha Morrison; Jamaica	11.11
200 metres (wind: +0.3 m/s)	Brittany Brown; United States	22.35 CR	Tynia Gaither; Bahamas	22.41	A'Keyla Mitchell; United States	22.53
400 metres	Shaunae Miller-Uibo; Bahamas	49.40 CR	Sada Williams; Barbados	49.86	Stephenie Ann McPherson; Jamaica	50.36
800 metres	Ajeé Wilson; United States	1:58.47	Allie Wilson; United States	1:58.48	Adelle Tracey; Jamaica	1:59.54
1500 metres	Heather MacLean; United States	4:04.53 CR	Adelle Tracey; Jamaica	4:08.42	Helen Schlachtenhaufen; United States	4:10.43
5000 metres	Natosha Rogers; United States	15:11.68 CR	Fiona O'Keeffe; United States	15:15.13	Rebecca Bassett; Canada*	16:15.95
10,000 metres	Stephanie Bruce; United States	33:12.42 CR	Emily Lipari; United States	33:54.61	Beverly Ramos; Puerto Rico	35:01.33
100 metres hurdles (wind: -0.8 m/s)	Alaysha Johnson; United States	12.62	Megan Tapper; Jamaica	12.68	Devynne Charlton; Bahamas	12.71
400 metres hurdles	Shiann Salmon; Jamaica	54.22	Janieve Russell; Jamaica	54.87	Cassandra Tate; United States	55.62
3000 metres steeplechase	Gabrielle Jennings; United States	9:34.36 CR	Katie Rainsberger; United States	9:40.74	Regan Yee; Canada*	9:54.92
4 × 100 metres relay	Javianne Oliver; Teahna Daniels; Morolake Akinosun; Celera Barnes; United States	42.35	Printassia Johnson; Anthonique Strachan; Devynne Charlton; Tynia Gaither; Bahamas	43.34	Natalliah Whyte; Natasha Morrison; Sada Williams; Megan Tapper; Jamaica	43.49
4 × 400 metres relay	Kaylin Whitney; Kyra Jefferson; A'Keyla Mitchell; Jaide Stepter Baynes; United States	3:23.54 CR	Andrenette Knight; Junelle Bromfield; Shiann Salmon; Janieve Russell; Jamaica	3:26.32	Only two entries	—N/a
20,000 metres walk	Mirna Ortiz; Guatemala	1:40:04.78 CR	Robyn Stevens; United States	1:40:47.16	Maria Michta-Coffey; United States	1:42:14.32
High jump	Vashti Cunningham; United States	1.92 m CR	Rachel Glenn; United States	1.84 m	Ximena Esquivel; Mexico	1.81 m
Pole vault	Alina McDonald; United States	4.50 m	Emily Grove; United States	4.40 m	Rachel Hyink; Canada	4.20 m
Long jump	Quanesha Burks; United States	6.75 m +0.1	Christabel Nettey; Canada	6.46 m +0.1	Chanice Porter; Jamaica	6.43 m -0.2
Triple jump	Thea LaFond; Dominica	14.49 m +1.5 CR	Keturah Orji; United States	14.32 m -1.1	Davisleydi Velazco; Cuba	14.08 m +0.0
Shot put	Sarah Mitton; Canada	20.15 m CR	Jessica Woodard; United States	18.82 m	Jessica Ramsey; United States	18.74 m
Discus throw	Laulauga Tausaga-Collins; United States	63.18 m CR	Denia Caballero; Cuba	61.86 m	Rachel Dincoff; United States	61.56 m
Hammer throw	Janee' Kassanavoid; United States	71.51 m	Brooke Andersen; United States	68.66 m	Jillian Weir; Canada	66.20 m
Javelin throw	Kara Winger; United States	64.68 m CR	Ariana Ince; United States	59.69 m	Rhema Otabor; Bahamas	57.91 m

- Rules state a country can only win two medals per event. In both the women's 5000 metres and 3000 metres steeplechase, the United States swept the event, however the bronze medals went to the fourth placed athletes.

=== Mixed ===
Event	Gold		Silver		Bronze	
4 × 400 metres relay	Quincy Hall; Jaide Stepter Baynes; Ismail Turner; Kaylin Whitney; United States	3:12.05 CR	Jamaica	3:14.08	Cuba	3:20.35

=== Medal table ===
* Host nation (Bahamas)

Rank	team	Gold	Silver	Bronze	Total
1	United States	29	22	12	63
2	Jamaica	6	9	9	24
3	Canada	2	3	9	14
4	Cuba	2	1	3	6
5	Guatemala	2	0	1	3
6	Bahamas*	1	2	4	7
7	British Virgin Islands	1	0	0	1
7	Dominica	1	0	0	1
9	Trinidad and Tobago	0	2	0	2
10	Barbados	0	1	0	1
10	Bermuda	0	1	0	1
10	Saint Vincent and the Grenadines	0	1	0	1
13	Antigua and Barbuda	0	0	1	1
13	Mexico	0	0	1	1
13	Puerto Rico	0	0	1	1
Totals (15 entries)		44	42	41	127

== Participating nations ==
According to an unofficial count, 329 athletes from 26 countries participated.

- Antigua and Barbuda (4)
- Bahamas (28)
- Barbados (4)
- Belize (3)
- Bermuda (10)
- British Virgin Islands (4)
- Canada (37)
- Cayman Islands (2)
- Costa Rica (2)
- Cuba (26)
- Dominica (2)
- Grenada (2)
- Guadeloupe (8)
- Guatemala (7)
- Haiti (4)
- Honduras (2)
- Jamaica (36)
- Mexico (7)
- Puerto Rico (23)
- Saint Kitts and Nevis (3)
- Saint Vincent and the Grenadines (4)
- El Salvador (4)
- Trinidad and Tobago (12)
- Turks and Caicos Islands (4)
- United States (88)
- United States Virgin Islands (3)

== Schedule ==
August 19
EST Time	Track Events
6:00 a.m.	Women's 20 km Race-Walk Final
9:00 a.m.	Women's 100m Qualification
9:15 a.m.	Men's 100m Qualification
9:30 a.m.	Women's 400m Semi-Finals
9:45 a.m.	Men's 400m Semi-Finals
10:00 a.m.	Women's 100m Hurdles Qualification
10:30 a.m.	Men's 110m Hurdles Qualification
11:00 a.m.	Women's 200m Qualification
11:15 a.m.	Men's 200m Qualification
4:30 p.m.	Women's 400m Hurdles Semi-Finals
5:00 p.m.	Men's 400m Hurdles Semi-Finals
5:30 p.m.	Women's 800m Semi-Finals
5:45 p.m.	Men's 800m Semi-Finals
6:00 p.m.	Women's 3000m Steeplechase Final
7:20 p.m.	Women's 100m Hurdles Semi-Finals
7:40 p.m.	Men's 110m Hurdles Semi-Finals
8:00 p.m.	Women's 200m Semi-Finals
8:20 p.m.	Men's 200m Semi-Finals
8:40 p.m.	Women's 5000m Final
9:05 p.m.	Men's 10,000m Final
EST Time	Field Events
9:00 a.m.	Men's long jump Qualification
10:30 a.m.	Women's long jump Qualification
3:00 p.m.	Women's Hammer Final
5:00 p.m.	Men's Triple jump Final
5:00 p.m.	Women's High jump Final
7:30 p.m.	Women's Discus Final
7:30 p.m.	Men's Shot Final
August 20
EST Time	Track Events
6:00 a.m.	Men's 20 km Race-Walk Final
3:15 p.m.	Women's 100m Semi-Finals
3:35 p.m.	Men's 100m Semi-Finals
3:55 p.m.	Women's 800m Final
4:05 p.m.	Men's 800m Final
4:20 p.m.	Women's 100m Hurdles Final
4:35 p.m.	Men's 110m Hurdles Final
4:50 p.m.	Women's 400m Final
5:00 p.m.	Men's 400m Final
5:10 p.m.	Girls High School 4 × 100 m relay Final
5:20 p.m.	Boys High School 4 × 100 m relay Final
5:30 p.m.	Men's 5000m Final
6:00 p.m.	Women's 10,000m Final
6:45 p.m.	Women's 100m Final
7:00 p.m.	Men's 100m Final
7:15 p.m.	Mixed 4 × 400 m relay Final
EST Time	Field Events
2:00 p.m.	Men's Hammer Final
3:30 p.m.	Men's High jump Final
4:00 p.m.	Women's Pole vault Final
5:00 p.m.	Women's Long jump Final
5:00 p.m.	Men's Javelin Final
August 21
EST Time	Track Events
3:20 p.m.	Women's 400m Hurdles Final
3:35 p.m.	Men's 400m Hurdles Final
3:50 p.m.	Women's 200m Final
4:00 p.m.	Men's 200m Final
4:10 p.m.	Women's 1500m Final
4:20 p.m.	Men's 1500m Final
4:30 p.m.	Men's 3000m Steeplechase Final
4:50 p.m.	Girls High School 4 × 400 m relay Final
4:50 p.m.	Boys High School 4 × 400 m relay Final
5:10 p.m.	Women's 4 × 400 m relay Final
5:20 p.m.	Men's 4 × 400 m relay Final
5:30 p.m.	Women's 4 × 100 m relay Final
5:45 p.m.	Men's 4 × 100 m relay Final
EST Time	Field Events
2:00 p.m.	Men's Discus Final
2:00 p.m.	Men's Long jump Final
3:00 p.m.	Men's Pole vault Final
3:00 p.m.	Women's Shot Final
4:00 p.m.	Women's Javelin Final
4:00 p.m.	Women's Triple jump Final
