= Maggie Malone-Hardin =

American javelin thrower (born 1993)

Maggie Malone
Personal information
- Full name: Maggie Malone-Hardin
- Nationality: American
- Born: December 30, 1993 (age 32) Geneva, Nebraska, U.S.
- Home town: Geneva, Nebraska (93-15); College Station, Texas (15 - 22); Lincoln, Nebraska (22 - Present)
- Height: 5 ft 8 in (173 cm)
- Weight: 170 lb (77 kg)

Sport
- Sport: Track and field
- Event: Javelin throw
- College team: Nebraska Cornhuskers, Texas A&M Aggies '17
- Club: Nike
- Turned pro: 2016
- Coached by: Juan de la Garza (15 - 22); Justin St. Clair (22 - Present)

Achievements and titles
- Personal bests: Javelin: 67.40 m (221 ft 1 1/2 in) NR AR
- Updated on July 2016

Maggie Malone-Hardin (née Malone; born December 30, 1993) is an American track and field athlete competing in the javelin throw. She holds a personal record of 67.40 meters (221 feet, 2 inches) for the event, set in 2021, a national record. She was the 2016 American national and collegiate record holder and NCAA Division I champion. She is the American collegiate record holder. Maggie and Sam Hardin married in 2022.

== Prep ==
Born to Danny Malone and Nancy Kindig-Malone in College Station, Texas, and raised in Geneva, Nebraska, Maggie attended Fillmore Central High School, where her parents are teachers and coaches. Her mother, All-American collegiately for the Nebraska Cornhuskers, and she followed her mother's example was recruited to the University of Nebraska–Lincoln. Nancy Kindig-Malone qualified for the 1980 US Olympic trials. Nancy's induction into the Nebraska High School Sports Hall of Fame. She won Big Eight heptathlon and pentathlon titles at Nebraska, becoming an All-American and helping the Huskers win their first indoor national championship in 1982. Nancy also won a Class C state basketball title with Hastings St. Cecilia High School in 1977. Maggie won the 2012 Class C Nebraska School Activities Association state long jump title 5.78 m (18 ft 11 1/2 in), state triple jump bronze medal jumping 11.13 m (36 ft 6 in), 5th in 200 meters in 26.63 and 2011 Class C Nebraska School Activities Association state triple jump title.

== NCAA ==
Maggie Malone earned 4 NCAA Division I U.S. Track & Field and Cross Country Coaches Association All-American awards.

She started out in the heptathlon, placing 5th at 2013 Kansas Relays scoring 4369 points, but decided to focus on her strongest event – the javelin. In her first year of competition in 2013 she placed third at the Big Ten Conference championships and was tenth at the 2013 NCAA Outdoor Championships.

She greatly improved in the 2014 season, setting a best of 55.37 m (181 ft 7 3/4 in), winning the Big Ten Conference title, and placing fourth at the 2014 NCAA Outdoors.

Malone transferred to Texas A&M University and began throwing for the Texas A&M Aggies track team. In her first year in College Station, Texas, she was fourth at the Southeastern Conference (SEC) Championships and placed ninth at the NCAAs, failing to build on her previous season. Malone described this as "the worst season I've ever had", and credited the advice of teammate Lindon Victor with her change of approach to train harder in the summer months. Her sister, Audrey, joined her in the javelin team at Texas A&M.

She showed marked improvement in the 2016 season, bettering her personal record by a wide margin. She won the SEC Championships with a mark of 59.50 m (195 ft 2 1/2 in), before taking the title at the 2016 NCAA Division I Outdoor Track and Field Championships with a collegiate record of 62.19 m (204 ft 1/4 in). A victory at the 2016 United States Olympic Trials soon followed, making her the first athlete in American history to win the collegiate and national titles in the same year. This gained her a place on the American Olympic team.

Year	Competition	Venue	Position	Event	Notes
Representing Texas A&M Aggies
2016	2016 NCAA Division I Outdoor Track and Field Championships	University of Oregon	1st	Javelin	62.19 m (204 ft 0 in)
2016	SEC Outdoor Track and Field Championships	University of Alabama	1st	Javelin	59.50 m (195 ft 3 in)
2015	2015 NCAA Division I Outdoor Track and Field Championships	University of Oregon	9th	Javelin	51.97 m (170 ft 6 in)
2015	SEC Outdoor Track and Field Championships	Mississippi State University	4th	Javelin	49.93 m (163 ft 10 in)
Representing Nebraska Cornhuskers
2014	NCAA Division I Outdoor Track and Field Championships	University of Oregon	4th	Javelin	55.24 m (181 ft 3 in)
2014	Big Ten Outdoor Track and Field Championships	Purdue University	1st	Javelin	55.37 m (181 ft 8 in)
2013	NCAA Division I Outdoor Track and Field Championships	University of Oregon	10th	Javelin	48.62 m (159 ft 6 in)
2013	Big Ten Outdoor Track and Field Championships	Ohio State University	3rd	Javelin	50.60 m (166 ft 0 in)

== National titles ==
- USA Outdoor Track and Field Championships
  - Javelin throw: 2016
- NCAA Women's Division I Outdoor Track and Field Championships
  - Javelin throw: 2016

== Professional ==
In August 2022, Maggie Malone-Hardin moved to coach at University of Nebraska–Lincoln. On top of coaching, she continues to train professionally. Her college teammate and now husband Sam Hardin helps coach her. Sam has transitioned from being an All-American performer with the Aggies to being Maggie's coach and best friend.

=== Olympic Games ===
Malone has represented the United States in three editions of the Olympic games, 2016, 2020 and 2024 (2020 was actually held in 2021 due to the COVID-19 pandemic). In 2016 she finished 25th in the qualifying round with a throw of 56.47 m and thus did not qualify for the finals. In 2020 she had the second-best throw in the qualifying round, 63.07 m, and in the final placed 10th with a throw of 59.82 m.

Malone signed to Nike and began throwing in Fall 2017 and is training for US Outdoor Track and Field Championships. As a Master graduate student in marketing (c/o 2019), Malone trains at Texas A&M with Juan De La Garza.

Year	Competition	Venue	Position	Event	Notes
Representing United States
2016	Olympic Games	Rio de Janeiro, Brazil	25th	Javelin	56.47 m (185 ft 3 in)
2019	The Match Europe v USA	Minsk, Belarus	7th	Javelin	54.79 m (179 ft 9 in)
2021	Olympic Games	Tokyo, Japan	10th	Javelin	59.82 m (196 ft 3 in)
2024	Olympic Games	Paris, France	24th (q)	Javelin	58.76 m (192 ft 9 1/4 in)

=== US Outdoor Track and Field Championship ===
Year	Competition	Venue	Position	Event	Notes
2016	USA Olympic Trials	Eugene, Oregon	1st	Javelin	60.84 m (199 ft 7 in)
2019	2019 USA Outdoor Track and Field Championships	Des Moines, Iowa	5th	Javelin	54.47 m (178 ft 8 1/4 in)
2021	USA Olympic Trials	Eugene, Oregon	1st	Javelin	63.50 m (208 ft 4 in)
2022	2022 USA Outdoor Track and Field Championships	Eugene, Oregon	19th	Javelin	
