= Athing Mu-Nikolayev =

American middle-distance runner (born 2002)

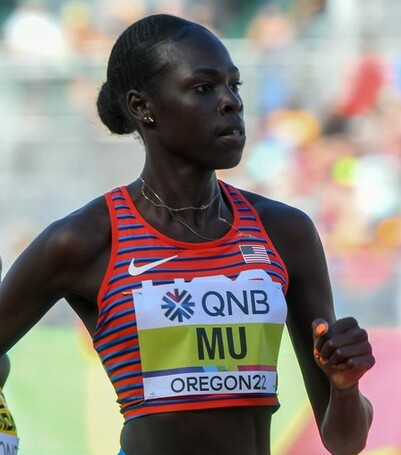
- Mu competing at the 2022 World Athletics Championships

Personal information
- Born: June 8, 2002 (age 24) Trenton, New Jersey, U.S.
- Height: 5 ft 10 in (178 cm)
- Weight: 124 lb (56 kg)
- Spouse: Yegor Nikolayev (m. 2025)

Sport
- Country: United States
- Sport: Track and field
- Events: 800 meters, 400 meters
- College team: Texas A&M Aggies
- Club: Nike; Trenton Track Club (youth)
- Coached by: Bobby Kersee (2023–2025); Milton Mallard (2021–2022); Al Jennings (youth); Bernice Mitchell (youth)

Achievements and titles
- Personal bests: 400 m: 49.57 AJR (Eugene 2021); 800 m: 1:54.97 NR (Eugene 2023); Indoors; 400 m: 50.52i (College Station 2021); 800 m: 1:58.40i WJR (College Station 2021)
Medal record
Women's athletics
Representing the United States
Olympic Games
Gold medal – first place	2020 Tokyo	800 m
Gold medal – first place	2020 Tokyo	4 × 400 m relay
World Championships
Gold medal – first place	2022 Eugene	800 m
Bronze medal – third place	2023 Budapest	800 m
Pan American U20 Championships
Gold medal – first place	2019 San José	800 m
Youth Olympic Games
Silver medal – second place	2018 Buenos Aires	800 m
- Updated on July 24, 2022

Athing Mu-Nikolayev (/əˈθɪŋ moʊ/; née Mu; born June 8, 2002) is an American middle-distance runner. She is the youngest woman to hold Olympic and world titles in an individual track and field event. At the age of 19, Mu won the gold medal in the 800 meters at the 2020 Tokyo Olympics, breaking a national record set by Ajeé Wilson in 2017, and a continental under-20 record. She took a second gold as part of the women's 4 × 400 m relay. She was the 800 m 2022 World champion, becoming the first American woman to win the world championship title over the distance.

Mu holds the world under-20 record in the women's indoor 800 m, which she set in early 2021. She also holds the world U20 best in the indoor 600 meters, set in 2019 when she was 16 years of age with the third fastest time run indoors.

== Early life ==
Athing Mu was born and raised in Trenton, New Jersey, and is the second youngest of seven siblings. Her parents immigrated to the United States from South Sudan, and her family is of Dinka descent. She began competing in track at the age of 6. Mu did not join her high school track team, choosing to compete instead for Trenton Track Club. She graduated from Trenton Central High School in 2020.

== Career ==
On February 24, 2019, Mu broke the American women's record at the 600 meter event at the 2019 USA Indoor Track and Field Championships with a time of 1:23.57. She bested the previous American women's record of 1:23.59 held by Alysia Montaño, and nearly broke the women's world record of 1:23.44, held by Olga Kotlyarova.

=== 2021 ===
On February 6, Mu ran indoor 50.52 s in the women's 400 meters, which was 0.3 seconds faster than Sanya Richards' official world under-20 record ratified by World Athletics. However, Mu's time was slower than the 50.36 s set by fellow American Sydney McLaughlin, which was not able to meet the standards for world record ratification. On February 27, she ran 1:58.40 in the 800 meters to set an indoor collegiate and world under-20 record. She bested the previous collegiate record by more than two seconds. On April 17 in Waco, Texas, running outdoors, Mu set the 800 meter USA collegiate record with a time of 1:57.73. At the 2021 NCAA Championships in Eugene, Oregon on June 12, 2021, she lowered her collegiate all-time record mark to 49.57 s in winning the 400 m, before anchoring the Texas A&M Women's 4 × 400 m relay squad to victory and a new collegiate record of 3:22.34 later in the day.

Mu qualified for the delayed 2020 Tokyo Olympics at the US Olympic trials held in Eugene, Oregon by placing first in the event with a time of 1:56.07, a world-leading time and the second-fastest result in American history. At the Tokyo Games, she won two gold medals for the women's 800 meters and women's 4 × 400 meters relay. In her individual event, Mu led from gun to tape in a dominant showing, finishing clear ahead of Keely Hodgkinson and compatriot Raevyn Rogers. She broke the American women's 800 meter record with a 1:55.21s performance and ended a 53-year Olympic win drought for the USA – the last American woman who won the event was Madeline Manning at the 1968 Mexico Olympics (first Olympic 800 m male or female win since Dave Wottle at the Munich 1972). Mu became also the youngest U.S. woman to win individual Olympic track and field title since Wyomia Tyus earned the 100 m title at the 1964 Tokyo Games.

In her first post-Olympic race at the Prefontaine Classic, she improved upon her American 800 m record, setting a time of 1:55.04s despite running by herself over the final lap, also the all-comers' record, making her the second fastest U20 woman ever after Pamela Jelimo and putting her eighth on the world all-time list.

In that record-breaking season Mu competed 36 times (including rounds) and triumphed in 35 races to be voted World Athletics Female Rising Star of the Year.

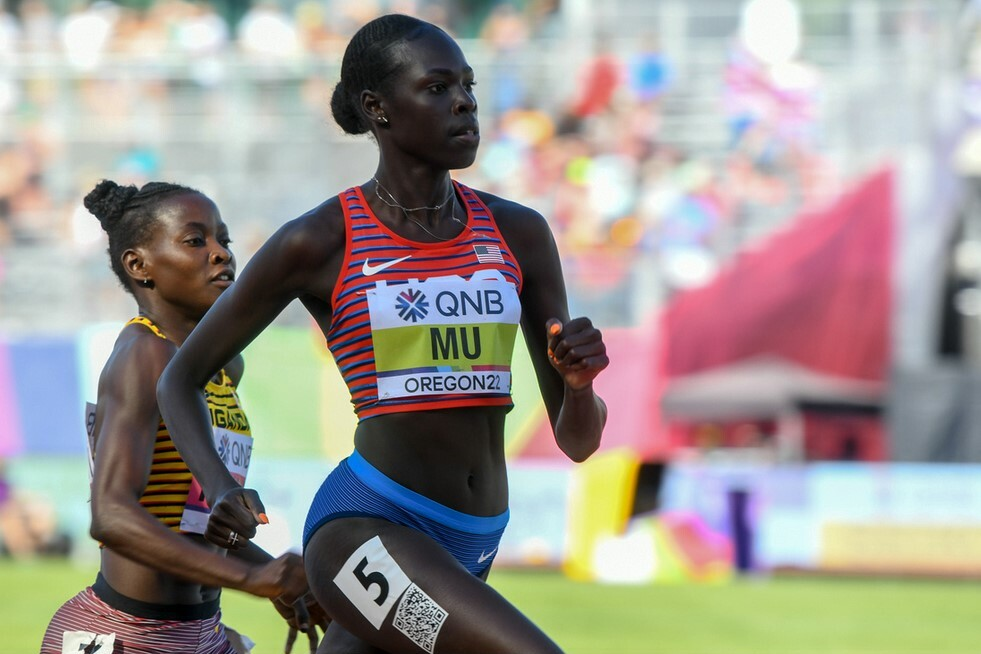
Mu at the 2022 World Championships in Eugene, Oregon

=== 2022 ===
At the World Championships in Eugene, Oregon in July, Mu this time barely held off Hodgkinson to take the women's 800 m gold with a world-leading time of 1:56.30. She won by 0.08 s after a tight finish on the home stretch, with Mary Moraa trailing in third. Thus, Mu became the first American woman to win the 800 m world championship title, and the youngest woman in history to own Olympic and world titles in an individual track and field event. She also extended her outdoor win streak to nearly three years as she hadn't lost an outdoor race (in any round, at any distance) since September 2019.

=== 2023 ===
At the 2023 USA Outdoor Track and Field Championships, Mu competed in the 1500 m and placed second. As the winner of the previous year's iteration, she automatically qualified for the year's world championships in the 800 m. Although whether she would compete was in doubt, at the World Championships in Budapest, Hungary, Mu competed in the 800 m and placed third to Mary Moraa and Keely Hodgkinson. She had only run one 800 m race all season prior to this. At September's 2023 Prefontaine Classic, she won the Diamond League final in a time of 1:54.97 to set an American record and defeat Moraa and Hodgkinson.

=== 2024–2025 ===
After a nine-month hiatus, Mu returned to competition at the 2024 United States Olympic trials. During the 800 meters final, she tripped and fell, and finished in last place. As a result, she would not compete to defend her Olympic gold from three years prior. She raced the 800m again at the Holloway Pro Classic in Gainesville, Florida one month later and placed 5th in 2:00.29.

At the 2025 USA Outdoor Track and Field Championships, Mu was eliminated in the semifinal round of the 800 meters, finishing fourth in her heat with a season's best of 1:59.79.

In December 2025, it was announced that Mu parted ways with her coach Bobby Kersee, relocating to Dallas.

== Personal life ==
Mu got married on March 8, 2025 in a private ceremony in Newport Beach, California. On October 15, 2026, she announced that her and her husband were expecting their first child.

== Achievements ==
All information taken from World Athletics profile.

=== Personal bests ===
Event	Time	Venue	Date	Notes
400 meters	49.57	Eugene, OR, United States	June 12, 2021	AU20R
4 × 400 m relay split	48.32	Tokyo, Japan	August 7, 2021	fourth leg
400 meters indoor	50.52 i	College Station, TX, United States	February 6, 2021	
600 meters indoor	1:23.57 i	New York, NY, United States	February 24, 2019	AU18B WU20B AB
800 meters	1:54.97	Eugene, OR, United States	September 17, 2023	NR
800 meters NCAA	1:57.73	Waco, TX, United States	April 17, 2021	CR
800 meters indoor	1:58.40 i	Fayetteville, AR, United States	February 27, 2021	CR WU20R
1500 meters	4:03.44	Eugene, OR, United States	July 8, 2023	
One mile indoor	4:37.99 i	College Station, TX, United States	January 15, 2022	

=== International competitions ===
Representing the United States
Year	Competition	Venue	Position	Event	Time	Notes
2018	Youth Olympic Games	Buenos Aires, Argentina	2nd	800 m	2:05.23	
2019	Pan American U20 Championships	San José, Costa Rica	1st	800 m	2:05.50	
2019	Pan American Games	Lima, Peru	11th (sf)	800 m	2:07.30	
2019	The Match Europe v USA	Minsk, Belarus	8th	400 m	54.34	
2019	The Match Europe v USA	Minsk, Belarus	7th	800 m	2:06.68	
2021	Olympic Games	Tokyo, Japan	1st	800 m	1:55.21	AU20R NR
2021	Olympic Games	Tokyo, Japan	1st	4 × 400 m relay	3:16.85	WL SB
2022	World Championships	Eugene, OR, United States	1st	800 m	1:56.30	WL
2023	World Championships	Budapest, Hungary	3rd	800 m	1:56.61	SB

=== Circuit wins ===
- Diamond League
  - 2021 (800 m): Eugene Prefontaine Classic (1:55.04 MR AU20R NR)
  - 2022 (800 m): Rome Golden Gala (1:57.01 WL)
  - 2023 (800 m): Eugene Prefontaine Classic (1:54.97 MR NR)

=== National championships ===
Representing Trenton Track Club (2008–2020), Texas A&M (2020–2021), and Nike (2021–Present)
Year	Competition	Venue	Position	Event	Time	Notes
2013	USATF Junior Olympic Championships	Greensboro, North Carolina	3rd	800 m	2:19.47	SB
2013	USATF Junior Olympic Championships	Greensboro, North Carolina	1st	1500 m	4:48.58	SB
2017	NSAF Indoor Nationals	New York, New York	7th	400 m	58.30	SB
2017	NSAF Indoor Nationals	New York, New York	1st	Mile	4:59.48	PB
2017	NSAF Nationals	Greensboro, North Carolina	10th	400 m	57.17	SB
2017	NSAF Nationals	Greensboro, North Carolina	2nd	800 m	2:07.70	SB
2017	NSAF Nationals	Greensboro, North Carolina	1st	Mile	5:02.55	PB
2017	AAU Junior Olympic Nationals	Ypsilanti, Michigan	1st	800 m	2:07.99	SB
2017	AAU Junior Olympic Nationals	Ypsilanti, Michigan	1st	1500 m	4:33.04	PB
2018	NSAF Indoor Nationals	New York, New York	1st	400 m	54.98	SB
2018	NSAF Indoor Nationals	New York, New York	1st	800 m	2:06.59	SB
2018	NSAF Nationals	Greensboro, North Carolina	1st	400 m	54.12	
2018	NSAF Nationals	Greensboro, North Carolina	1st	800 m	2:04.51	SB
2018	AAU Junior Olympic Nationals	Des Moines, Iowa	2nd	200 m	24.07	(-2.7 m/s)
2018	AAU Junior Olympic Nationals	Des Moines, Iowa	1st	400 m	52.83	
2018	AAU Junior Olympic Nationals	Des Moines, Iowa	1st	800 m	2:07.54	
2018	AAU Junior Olympic Nationals	Des Moines, Iowa	1st	1500 m	4:38.78	
2019	USATF Indoor Championships	New York, New York	1st	600 m	1:23.57	WL CR AU18B WU20B AB
2019	NSAF Indoor Nationals	New York, New York	2nd	800 m	2:05.86	PB
2019	NSAF Nationals	Greensboro, North Carolina	2nd	400 m	51.98	PB
2019	USATF U20 Championships	Miramar, Florida	1st	800 m	2:05.59	
2019	USATF Championships	Des Moines, Iowa	5th	800 m	2:01.17	PB
2020	USATF Indoor Championships – HS	Albuquerque, New Mexico	4th	800 m	2:14.18	(HS athletes)
2021	NCAA Division I Indoor Championships	Fayetteville, Arkansas	2nd	400 m	51.03	
2021	NCAA Division I Indoor Championships	Fayetteville, Arkansas	1st	4 × 400 m relay	3:26.68	
2021	NCAA Division I Championships	Eugene, Oregon	1st	400 m	49.57	CR AU20R
2021	NCAA Division I Championships	Eugene, Oregon	1st	4 × 400 m relay	3:22.34	CR
2021	U.S. Olympic Trials	Eugene, Oregon	1st	800 m	1:56.07	
2022	USATF Championships	Eugene, Oregon	1st	800 m	1:57.16	
2023	USATF Championships	Eugene, Oregon	2nd	1500 m	4:03.44	
2024	U.S. Olympic Trials	Eugene, Oregon	9th	800 m	2:19.69	

== Awards ==
- World Athletics Awards

Rising Star (Women)：2021
