= Andrew Hudson =

Andrew Hudson may refer to:

- Andrew Hudson (cricketer)
- Andrew Hudson (sprinter)
