= 2019 World Athletics Championships – Women's 4 × 100 metres relay =

Women's 4 × 100 metres relay at the 2019 World Championships
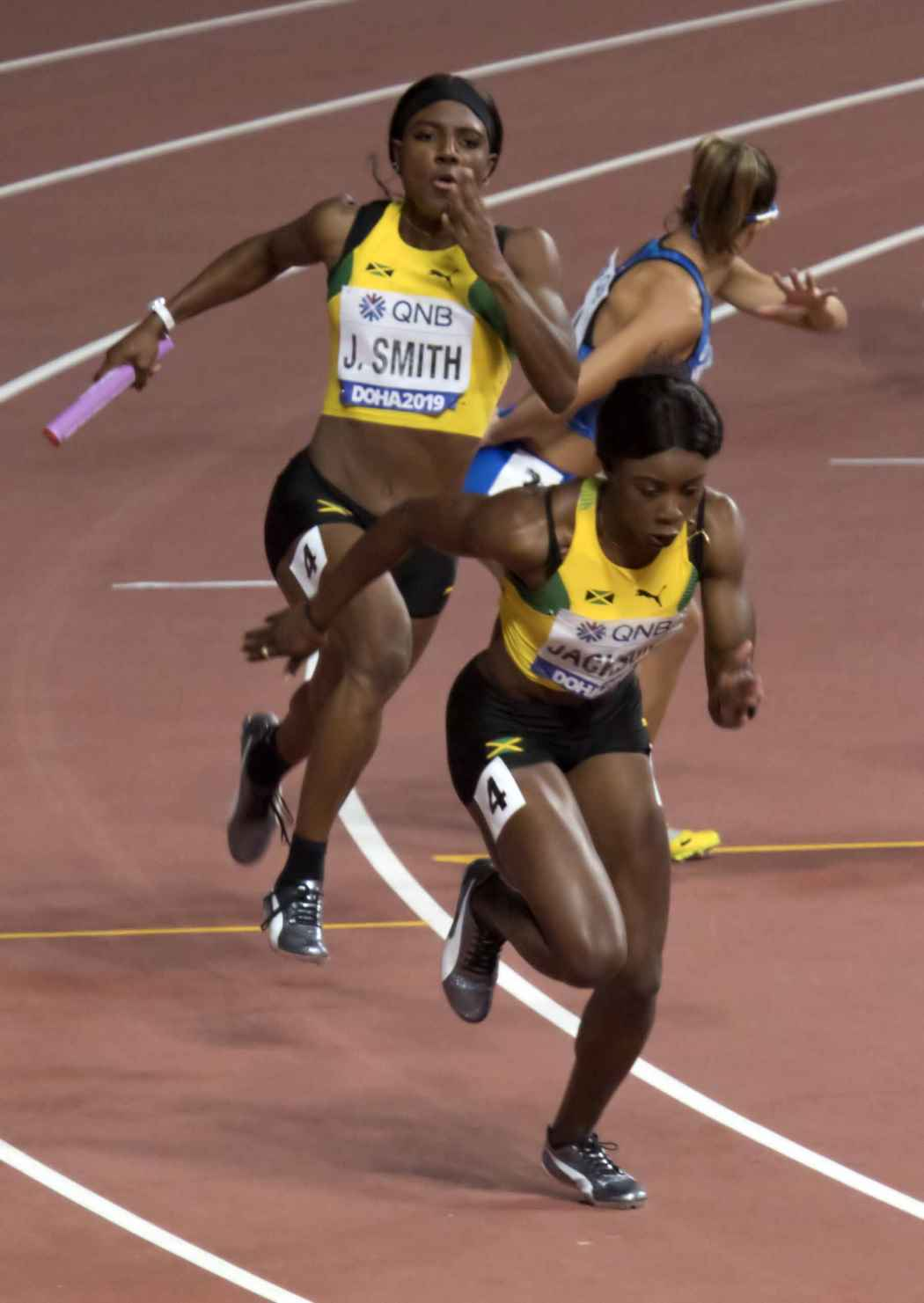
- 4 × 100 m women final
- Venue: Khalifa International Stadium
- Dates: 4 October (heats); 5 October (final)
- Competitors: 67 from 16 nations
- Teams: 16
- Winning time: 41.44

Medalists
gold medal	Natalliah Whyte; Shelly-Ann Fraser-Pryce; Jonielle Smith; Shericka Jackson; Natasha Morrison*	Jamaica
silver medal	Asha Philip; Dina Asher-Smith; Ashleigh Nelson; Daryll Neita; Imani-Lara Lansiquot*	Great Britain
bronze medal	Dezerea Bryant; Teahna Daniels; Morolake Akinosun; Kiara Parker	United States

Video on YouTube Official Video

The women's 4 × 100 metres relay at the 2019 World Athletics Championships was held at the Khalifa International Stadium in Doha, Qatar, from 4 to 5 October 2019.

== Summary ==
Already the world leader from their qualifying heat, Jamaica added a fresh Shericka Jackson to anchor. The British team brought in their star Dina Asher-Smith to run the second leg. Uncharacteristically, the United States chose to run the same four athletes in both heat and final.

On the first leg of the final, Natalliah Whyte got Jamaica into the lead passing to their star Shelly-Ann Fraser-Pryce first. Against Asher-Smith, two lanes to her outside and the United States' Teahna Daniels three lanes out, Fraser-Pryce appeared to gain slightly against the stagger. One lane outside of Jamaica, Trinidad and Tobago's Kelly-Ann Baptiste had been left far behind, falling out of contention. Fraser-Price handed off to Jonielle Smith with the Jamaican lead intact.

Through the turn, Jamaica maintained the lead, while America's Morolake Akinosun and Great Britain's Ashleigh Nelson battled for second with Mujinga Kambundji bringing the Swiss team into contention, chased by China. Jamaica's final pass to Jackson had a slight hesitation but they still left the zone with a 3 metre lead.

Great Britain entered the final zone side by side with the United States. The British quartet's baton, passing to Daryll Neita on anchor was almost perfect, as the stick never stopped moving. In comparison, Morolake Akinosun for the United States all but ran up onto Kiara Parker before making the exchange. The British gained a metre and a half coming out of the zone with Switzerland's pass to Salomé Kora keeping pace.

Jackson held on to Jamaica's lead across the finish line with Neita running a strong final leg to keep the pressure on. Parker for the United States was unable to make any gain, but they held off a fast closing Switzerland for bronze.

Behind the front four, China's final pass from Kong Lingwei to Ge Manqi was disastrous. Arriving in the zone in contention for the bronze medal along with Switzerland, Great Britain and the United States, they were unable to complete the pass within the 30 metre zone. Two metres after the zone, Ge stopped with both athletes still holding the baton. Ge released it and both athletes scurried back into the zone, hesitated for a moment, then attempted to affect the exchange again. Kong tried to step forward to pass the baton, but she passed Ge who was standing in a statuesque position and not ready to accept the baton. Kong then stepped behind Ge, handed her the baton and Ge finally took off running some 20 seconds after Jackson, Neita and Parker had already crossed the finish line. The efforts were in vain in any case, as because the baton pass did not adhere to the rules, China was disqualified.

Jamaica's winning time 41.44 was the eighth fastest women's 4 × 100 of all time. At this point, five of the top eight times in history were Jamaican; Shelly-Ann Fraser-Pryce had participated in all five.

== Records ==
Before the competition records were as follows:

Record	Perf.	Team	Date	Location
World	40.82	United States; Tianna Madison, Allyson Felix, Bianca Knight, Carmelita Jeter	10 Aug 2012	London, United Kingdom
Championship	41.07	Jamaica; Veronica Campbell-Brown, Natasha Morrison, Elaine Thompson, Shelly-Ann Fraser-Pryce	29 Aug 2015	Beijing, China
World leading	41.67	Germany; Lisa-Marie Kwayie, Yasmin Kwadwo, Tatjana Pinto, Gina Lückenkemper	1 Sep 2019	Berlin, Germany
African	42.39	Nigeria; Beatrice Utondu, Faith Idehen, Christy Opara-Thompson, Mary Onyali-Omagbemi	7 Aug 1992	Barcelona, Spain
Asian	42.23	China; Xiao Lin, Li Yali, Liu Xiaomei, Li Xuemei	23 Oct 1997	Shanghai, China
NACAC	40.82	United States; Tianna Madison, Allyson Felix, Bianca Knight, Carmelita Jeter	10 Aug 2012	London, United Kingdom
South American	42.29	Brazil; Evelyn dos Santos, Ana Cláudia Lemos, Franciela Krasucki, Rosângela Santos	18 Aug 2013	Moscow, Russia
European	41.37	East Germany; Silke Gladisch-Möller, Sabine Rieger, Ingrid Auerswald-Lange, Marlies Göhr	6 Oct 1985	Canberra, Australia
Oceanian	42.99	Australia; Rachael Massey, Suzanne Broadrick, Jodi Lambert, Melinda Gainsford-Taylor	18 Mar 2000	Pietersburg, South Africa

The following records were set at the competition:

Record	Perf.	Team	Date
Italian	42.90	Italy; Johanelis Herrera Abreu, Gloria Hooper, Anna Bongiorni, Irene Siragusa	4 Oct 2019
World leading	41.44	Jamaica; Natalliah Whyte, Shelly-Ann Fraser-Pryce, Jonielle Smith, Shericka Jackson	5 Oct 2019
Swiss	42.18	Switzerland; Ajla Del Ponte, Sarah Atcho, Mujinga Kambundji, Salomé Kora	5 Oct 2019

== Schedule ==
The event schedule, in local time (UTC+3), was as follows:

Date	Time	Round
4 October	20:40	Heats
5 October	22:05	Final

== Results ==
=== Heats ===
The first three in each heat (Q) and the next two fastest (q) qualified for the final.

Rank	Heat	Lane	Nation	Athletes	Time	Notes
1	2	8	Jamaica	Natalliah Whyte, Shelly-Ann Fraser-Pryce, Jonielle Smith, Natasha Morrison	42.11	Q, SB
2	2	4	Great Britain & N.I.	Asha Philip, Imani-Lara Lansiquot, Ashleigh Nelson, Daryll Neita	42.25	Q, SB
3	2	6	China	Liang Xiaojing, Wei Yongli, Kong Lingwei, Ge Manqi	42.36	Q
4	1	3	United States	Dezerea Bryant, Teahna Daniels, Morolake Akinosun, Kiara Parker	42.46	Q
5	1	4	Trinidad and Tobago	Semoy Hackett, Kelly-Ann Baptiste, Reyare Thomas, Kamaria Durant	42.75	Q, SB
6	1	7	Switzerland	Ajla Del Ponte, Sarah Atcho, Mujinga Kambundji, Salomé Kora	42.82	Q
7	2	2	Germany	Lisa-Marie Kwayie, Yasmin Kwadwo, Jessica-Bianca Wessolly, Gina Lückenkemper	42.82	q
8	2	7	Italy	Johanelis Herrera Abreu, Gloria Hooper, Anna Bongiorni, Irene Siragusa	42.90	q, NR
9	1	2	Netherlands	Nargélis Statia Pieter, Marije van Hunenstijn, Jamile Samuel, Naomi Sedney	43.01	
10	2	3	Nigeria	Joy Udo-Gabriel, Blessing Okagbare, Mercy Ntia-Obong, Rosemary Chukwuma	43.05	SB
11	2	5	Ghana	Flings Owusu-Agyapong, Gemma Acheampong, Persis William-Mensah, Halutie Hor	43.62	SB
12	1	5	Kazakhstan	Rima Kashafutdinova, Elina Mikhina, Svetlana Golendova, Olga Safronova	43.79	
13	1	9	Denmark	Astrid Glenner-Frandsen, Ida Karstoft, Mette Graversgaard, Mathilde Kramer	43.92	
	1	6	Australia	Melissa Breen, Nana Adoma Owusu-Afriyie, Maddie Coates, Celeste Mucci	DNF	
	2	9	Brazil	Bruna Farias, Vitória Cristina Rosa, Lorraine Martins, Rosângela Santos	DQ	163.3(a)
	1	8	France	Carolle Zahi, Cynthia Leduc, Estelle Raffai, Orlann Ombissa-Dzangue	DQ	170.7

=== Final ===
The final was started on 5 October at 22:05.

Rank	Lane	Nation	Athletes	Time	Notes
1st place, gold medalist(s)	4	Jamaica	Natalliah Whyte, Shelly-Ann Fraser-Pryce, Jonielle Smith, Shericka Jackson	41.44	WL
2nd place, silver medalist(s)	6	Great Britain & N.I.	Asha Philip, Dina Asher-Smith, Ashleigh Nelson, Daryll Neita	41.85	SB
3rd place, bronze medalist(s)	7	United States	Dezerea Bryant, Teahna Daniels, Morolake Akinosun, Kiara Parker	42.10	SB
4	9	Switzerland	Ajla Del Ponte, Sarah Atcho, Mujinga Kambundji, Salomé Kora	42.18	NR
5	2	Germany	Lisa-Marie Kwayie, Yasmin Kwadwo, Jessica-Bianca Wessolly, Gina Lückenkemper	42.48	
6	5	Trinidad and Tobago	Semoy Hackett, Kelly-Ann Baptiste, Mauricia Prieto, Kamaria Durant	42.71	SB
7	3	Italy	Johanelis Herrera Abreu, Gloria Hooper, Anna Bongiorni, Irene Siragusa	42.98	
	8	China	Liang Xiaojing, Wei Yongli, Kong Lingwei, Ge Manqi	DSQ	170.7
