= Josh Awotunde =

American track and field athlete

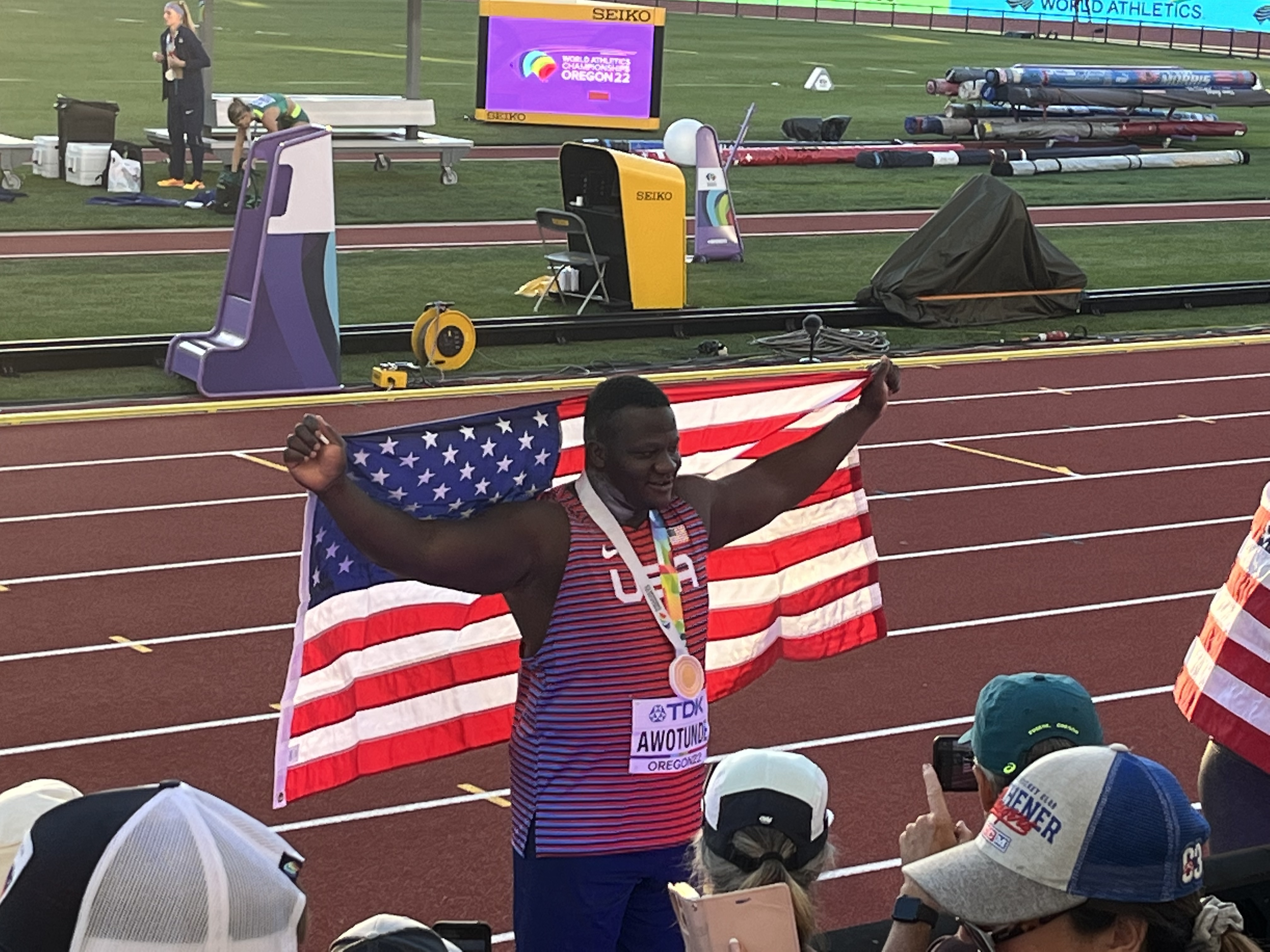
- Awotunde at the 2022 World Championships

Personal information
- Full name: Josh Olayinka Awotunde
- Born: June 12, 1995 (age 31) Lanham, Maryland, U.S.
- Home town: Franklinville, New Jersey, U.S.
- Height: 6 ft 2 in (188 cm)

Sport
- Country: United States
- Sport: Track and field
- Event: Shot put
- College team: University of South Carolina 2013–2018; Delsea Regional High School '13

Achievements and titles
- Personal bests: 22.47 m (73 ft 8 1/2 in) Outdoor; 21.74 m (71 ft 3 3/4 in) Indoor
Medal record
Men's athletics
Representing the United States
World Championships
Bronze medal – third place	2022 Eugene	Shot put
NACAC Championships
Gold medal – first place	2025 Bahamas	Shot put

Josh Olayinka Awotunde (born June 12, 1995) is an American track and field athlete who competes in the shot put and has a personal record of 22.29 m (73 ft 1 1/2 in) outdoors and 21.74 m (71 ft 3 3/4 in) indoors. Awotunde is the 2025 USA Track & Field Men's Shot Put Champion with a throw of 22.47 m (73 ft 8.64 in).

== Personal life ==
Awotunde was born in Lanham, Maryland in 1995. He was raised in Franklinville, New Jersey, by parents Adeola and Christina Awotunde. He is a 2013 graduate of Delsea Regional High School in New Jersey. Awotunde attended University of South Carolina and graduated in 2017. He is of Nigerian ancestry.

== Professional ==
representing United States
2025 NACAC Championships	Shot Put	21.68 m (71 ft 1 1/2 in)	(gold) 1st
2023 World Athletics Championships	Shot Put	19.98 m (65 ft 6 1/2 in)	20th
2022 World Athletics Championships	Shot Put	22.29 m (73 ft 1 1/2 in)	(bronze) 3rd
2022 World Athletics Indoor Championships	Shot Put	21.70 m (71 ft 2 1/4 in)	5th
2019 Pan American Games	Shot Put	20.66 m (67 ft 9 1/4 in)	6th
2019 The Match Europe v USA	Shot Put	19.04 m (62 ft 5 1/2 in)	9th
representing Shore Athletic Club
2025 USA Outdoor Track and Field Championships	Shot Put	22.47 m (73 ft 8 1/2 in)	(gold) 1st
2025 USA Indoor Track and Field Championships	Shot Put	21.05 m (69 ft 1/2 in)	(bronze) 3rd
2024 United States Olympic Trials	Shot Put	21.77 m (71 ft 5 in)	5th
2023 USA Outdoor Track and Field Championships	Shot Put	22.10 m (72 ft 6 in)	(silver) 2nd
representing Nike
2022 USA Outdoor Track and Field Championships	Shot Put	21.51 m (70 ft 6 3/4 in)	(bronze) 3rd
2022 USA Indoor Track and Field Championships	Shot Put	21.74 m (71 ft 3 3/4 in)	(silver) 2nd
2021 Meeting Città di Padova	Shot Put	22.00 m (72 ft 2 in)	(gold) 1st
2020 United States Olympic Trials	Shot Put	21.85 m (71 ft 8 in)	5th
representing Nigeria
2016 Confederation of African Athletics Grand Prix	Shot Put	18.95 m (62 ft 2 in)	(gold) 1st
representing Unattached
2019 USA Outdoor Track and Field Championships	Shot Put	20.97 m (68 ft 9 1/2 in)	5th
2019 USA Indoor Track and Field Championships	Shot Put	20.63 m (67 ft 8 in)	(bronze) 3rd
representing South Carolina Gamecocks
2018 USA Outdoor Track and Field Championships	Shot Put	20.14 m (66 ft 3/4 in)	7th
2017 USA Outdoor Track and Field Championships	Shot Put	19.02 m (62 ft 4 3/4 in)	14th
2016 Athletics Federation of Nigeria Championship	Shot Put	19.00 m (62 ft 4 in)	(silver) 2nd
2014 U20 USA Outdoor Track and Field Championships	Shot Put	19.17 m (62 ft 10 1/2 in)	(bronze) 3rd
2014 U20 USA Outdoor Track and Field Championships	Discus	58.37 m (191 ft 6 in)	4th
representing Delsea Regional High School
2013 U20 USA Outdoor Track and Field Championships	Discus	56.48 m (185 ft 3 1/2 in)	5th
2012 U20 USA Outdoor Track and Field Championships	Discus	51.13 m (167 ft 8 3/4 in)	20th

== NCAA ==
Awotunde competed for University of South Carolina, finishing second at the 2018 NCAA Division I Outdoor Track and Field Championships before graduating. Awotunde set his Personal Best in 2018 throwing 21.33 m (69 ft 11 3/4 in).

representing South Carolina Gamecocks
2018 NCAA Division I Outdoor Track and Field Championships	Shot Put	20.57 m (67 ft 5 3/4 in)	(silver) 2nd
2018 Southeastern Conference Outdoor Track and Field Championships	Shot Put	20.77 m (68 ft 1 1/2 in)	(silver) 2nd
2018 Southeastern Conference Outdoor Track and Field Championships	Discus	53.26 m (174 ft 8 3/4 in)	10th
2018 NCAA Division I Indoor Track and Field Championships	Shot Put	20.15 m (66 ft 1 1/4 in)	(bronze) 3rd
2018 Southeastern Conference Indoor Track and Field Championships	Shot Put	21.33 m (69 ft 11 3/4 in)	(gold) 1st NR
2017 NCAA Division I Outdoor Track and Field Championships	Shot Put	18.52 m (60 ft 9 in)	19th
2017 Southeastern Conference Outdoor Track and Field Championships	Shot Put	19.62 m (64 ft 4 1/4 in)	(silver) 2nd
2017 Southeastern Conference Outdoor Track and Field Championships	Discus	55.60 m (182 ft 4 3/4 in)	8th
2017 NCAA Division I Indoor Track and Field Championships	Shot Put	19.66 m (64 ft 6 in)	5th
2017 Southeastern Conference Indoor Track and Field Championships	Shot Put	18.34 m (60 ft 2 in)	7th
2016 NCAA Division I Outdoor Track and Field Championships	Discus	56.31 m (184 ft 8 3/4 in)	25th
2016 NCAA Division I Outdoor Track and Field Championships	Shot Put	19.43 m (63 ft 8 3/4 in)	7th
2016 Southeastern Conference Outdoor Track and Field Championships	Shot Put	18.81 m (61 ft 8 1/2 in)	4th
2016 Southeastern Conference Outdoor Track and Field Championships	Discus	53.52 m (175 ft 7 in)	8th
2016 Southeastern Conference Indoor Track and Field Championships	Shot Put	18.98 m (62 ft 3 in)	(silver) 2nd
2015 NCAA Division I Outdoor Track and Field Championships	Discus	55.73 m (182 ft 10 in)	28th
2015 NCAA Division I Outdoor Track and Field Championships	Shot Put	17.81 m (58 ft 5 in)	45th
2015 Southeastern Conference Outdoor Track and Field Championships	Shot Put	18.57 m (60 ft 11 in)	5th
2015 Southeastern Conference Outdoor Track and Field Championships	Discus	51.19 m (167 ft 11 1/4 in)	10th
2015 Southeastern Conference Indoor Track and Field Championships	Shot Put	18.08 m (59 ft 3 3/4 in)	7th

== Seasonal bests ==
Year	Shot Put (o)	Shot Put (i)
2025	22.47 m (73 ft 8 1/2 in)	21.05 m (69 ft 1/2 in)
2024	21.53 m (70 ft 7 1/2 in)	
2023	22.10 m (72 ft 6 in)	
2022	22.29 m (73 ft 1 1/2 in)	21.74 m (71 ft 3 3/4 in)
2021	22.00 m (72 ft 2 in)	21.27 m (69 ft 9 1/4 in)
2020	n/a	20.45 m (67 ft 1 in)
2019	21.13 m (69 ft 3 3/4 in)	20.63 m (67 ft 8 in)
2018	20.77 m (68 ft 1 1/2 in)	21.33 m (69 ft 11 3/4 in)
2017	19.96 m (65 ft 5 3/4 in)	19.66 m (64 ft 6 in)
2016	20.11 m (65 ft 11 1/2 in)	18.98 m (62 ft 3 in)
2015	18.57 m (60 ft 11 in)	18.08 m (59 ft 3 3/4 in)
2014	17.52 m (57 ft 5 3/4 in)	17.10 m (56 ft 1 in)
