= Tiffani McReynolds =

American hurdler (born 1991)

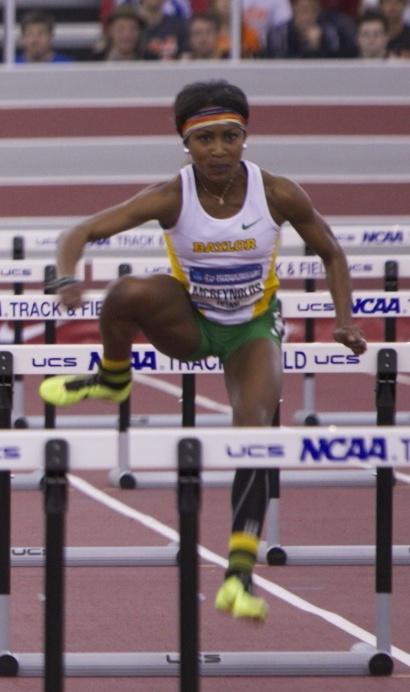
- McReynolds at the 2013 NCAA Division I Indoor Track and Field Championships

Personal information
- Nicknames: Froggy; Little Tiff
- Nationality: USA
- Born: 4 December 1991 (34 years, 241 days old)
- Home town: Kansas City, Missouri
- Education: The Pembroke Hill School; Baylor University
- Height: 153 cm (5 ft 0 in)
- Weight: 50 kg (110 lb)

Sport
- Sport: Athletics
- Events: 100 metres hurdles 60 metres hurdles
- College team: Baylor Bears
- Coached by: Bobby Kersee

Achievements and titles
- National finals: 2011 NCAA Indoors; • 60m hurdles, 2nd (silver); 2012 NCAA Indoors; • 60m hurdles, 4th; 2013 NCAA Indoors; • 60m hurdles, 2nd (silver); 2014 NCAA Indoors; • 60m hurdles, 2nd (silver); 2014 NCAAs; • 100m hurdles, 4th; 2015 USA Indoors; • 60m hurdles, 3rd (bronze); 2018 USA Indoors; • 60m hurdles, 8th; 2020 USA Indoors; • 60m hurdles, 3rd (bronze)
- Personal bests: 60mH: 7.39 A (2014); 100mH: 12.72 (+2.0) (2019)
- Updated on 6 December 2023

Tiffani McReynolds (born 4 December 1991) is an American hurdler. She is a three-time runner-up at the NCAA Division I Women's Indoor Track and Field Championships, on one occasion missing the title by 0.007 seconds, and she is a two-time USA Indoor Track and Field Championships top-three finisher.

== Biography ==
McReynolds grew up in Kansas City, Missouri where she started running in the fifth grade. She was noted for her small size, earning the nickname "Froggy" after her awkward hurdling style – a moniker she leaned into by wearing frog socks every time she ran. Attending The Pembroke Hill School, she won eight Missouri state titles in the hurdles and flat sprint events.

From 2011 to 2014, McReynolds competed for the Baylor Bears track and field team. She was a three-time runner-up at the NCAA Division I Women's Indoor Track and Field Championships, most notably at the 2014 edition where she lost the title to Arkansas State's Sharika Nelvis in a photo finish by just 0.007 seconds.

McReynolds qualified for the 2012 United States Olympic Trials, but she tore 80% of her left quadriceps muscle six weeks before the trials. She finished 6th in her heat and did not advance to the finals. At the 2016 United States Olympic Trials, McReynolds finished 6th in her semi-final and did not qualify for the finals again.

In 2019, McReynolds competed at The Match Europe v USA, finishing 7th in the 100-metre hurdles final and scoring 2 points for the United States team.

In 2020, McReynolds achieved her second national podium finish, taking the third spot in the 60 m hurdles at the 2020 USA Indoor Track and Field Championships. Later that year, McReynolds moved to Los Angeles to train under famed coach Bobby Kersee in preparation for the next Olympic Trials. At the trials, McReynolds finished 6th in her heat again and did not advance.

== Statistics ==
=== Personal bests ===
Event	Mark	Place	Competition	Venue	Date
60 metres hurdles	7.93 A	2nd place, silver medalist(s)	NCAA Division I Women's Indoor Track and Field Championships	Albuquerque, New Mexico	15 March 2014
100 metres hurdles	12.72 (+2.0 m/s)	2nd place, silver medalist(s)	Meeting Città di Padova	Padova, Italy	16 July 2019
