= Andrew Hudson (sprinter) =

Jamaican athlete (born 1996)

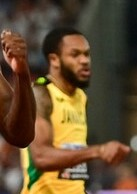
- Hudson (right) at the 2023 World Athletics Championships in the 200 metres final

Personal information
- Nationality: American, Jamaican
- Born: 14 December 1996 (age 29) San Antonio, Texas, U.S.
- Height: 1.80 m (5 ft 11 in)

Sport
- Country: Jamaica
- Sport: Athletics
- Event: Sprint
- College team: Texas Tech Red Raiders

Achievements and titles
- Personal bests: 100m: 10.07 (Miramar, 2023); 200m: 19.87 (Freeport, 2022)
Medal record
Men's track and field
Representing Jamaica
NACAC Championships
Gold medal – first place	2022 Freeport	200 m
Bronze medal – third place	2022 Freeport	4×100 m relay

Andrew Hudson (born 14 December 1996) is a track and field athlete who competes as a sprinter. Born in the United States, he represents Jamaica internationally. He is a twice Jamaican national champion over 200 metres.

== Early and personal life ==
Hudson was born and raised in San Antonio, Texas. He attended Steele High School. He attended Texas Tech University. In 2022, in honour of his Jamaican father, Andrew Hudson Senior, he chose to change affiliation to represent Jamaica at the international level.

== Career ==
=== 2022 ===
Hudson won the Jamaican national 200m title in 2022, finishing ahead of Yohan Blake in 20.10 seconds at the National Stadium in Kingston, Jamaica, in June 2022. It was his first competitive race in Jamaica. However, he was unable to represent Jamaica at the 2022 World Athletics Championships. Although the Jamaica Athletics Administrative Association had approved his nationalisation, he did not receive clearance in time for the games. With the team for the 2022 Commonwealth Games already chosen prior to the confirmation of his eligibility, Hudson said he did not want to take the place of another athlete who had earned a place on merit.

Hudson won the 200m at the 2022 NACAC Championships, held in the Bahamas, in a lifetime best and new meet record of 19.87 seconds.

=== 2023 ===
In March 2023, Hudson won the 100m at then Spring Break Classic in Puerto Rico, with a new personal best time of 10.12 seconds. In April 2023, he lowered his 100m best to 10.07, at the Miramar Invitational.

In July 2023, Hudson retained his national 200m title at the JAAA's National Track and Field Championships held at the National Stadium in Kingston. He won in 20.11 seconds, ahead of Rasheed Dwyer and Tyquendo Tracey. In doing so, he also achieved the qualifying standard for the 2023 World Athletics Championships held in Budapest, Hungary.

Competing in the 200m in Budapest in August 2023, Hudson qualified for the semi-finals. On his way to the track to compete, his athlete buggy that he was travelling in crashed, and Hudson had to run his semi-final with glass in his eye and blurred vision, and finished fifth in 20.38 seconds. He was subsequently granted a place in the final.

=== 2024-present ===
In July 2024, he was officially selected to compete in the 200m at the 2024 Paris Olympics where he did not reach the semi-finals.

An eye injury that occurred in 2023 has hampered his training for the 2024 and 2025 seasons.
