= Freddie Crittenden =

American athlete (born 1994)

Freddie Crittenden III
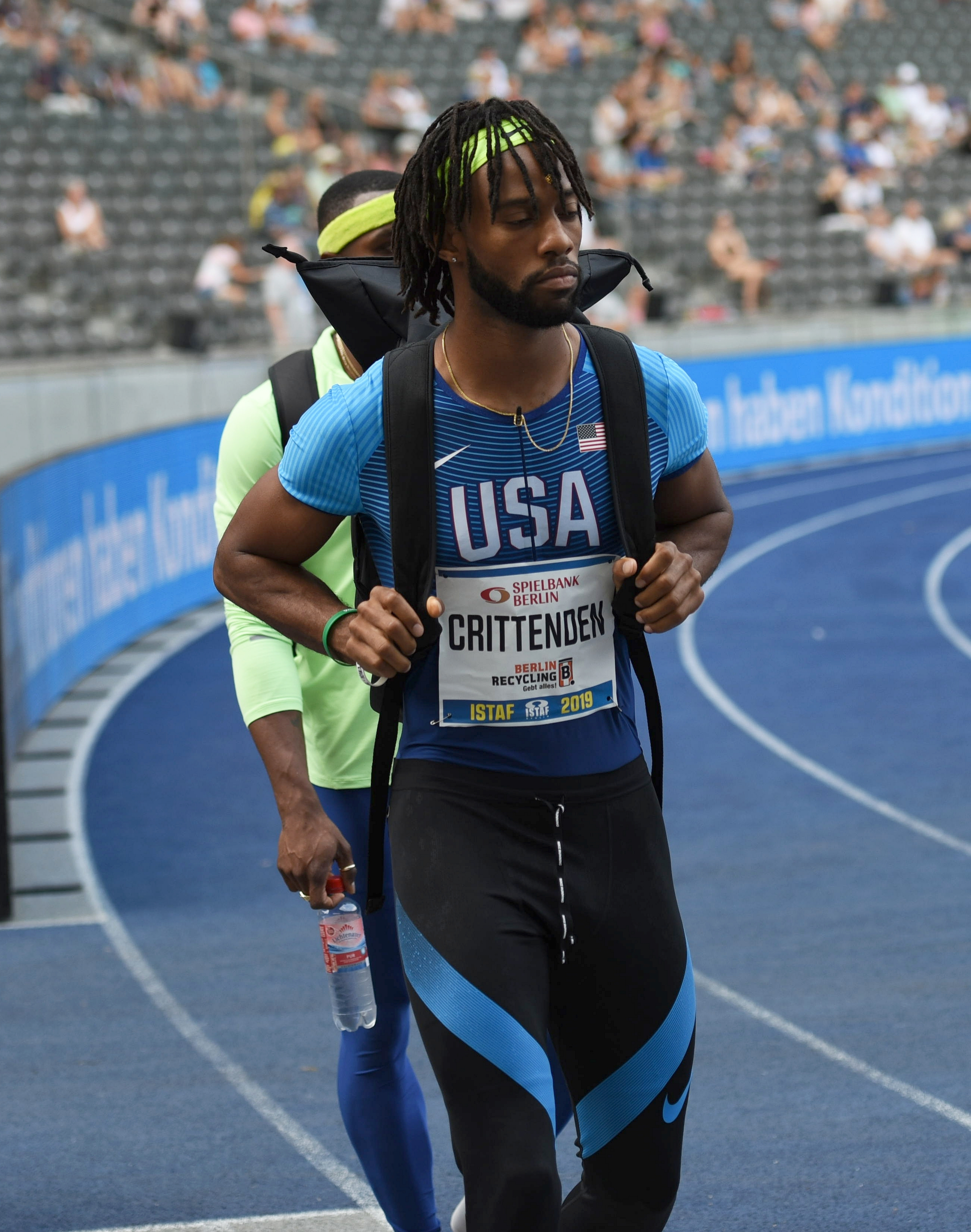
- Crittenden in 2019

Personal information
- Born: August 3, 1994 (age 32) Saint Louis, Missouri, United States
- Education: Utica High School; Syracuse University
- Height: 6 ft 2 in (188 cm)
- Weight: 168 lb (76 kg)

Sport
- Country: United States
- Sport: Track and field
- Event: 110 m hurdles
- College team: Syracuse Orange

Achievements and titles
- Personal bests: 100 m: 10.68 (Miramar 2025); 110 m H: 12.93 (Eugene 2024)
Medal record
Men's athletics
Representing the United States
Pan American Games
Silver medal – second place	2019 Lima	110 m hurdles
NACAC Championships
Gold medal – first place	2022 Freeport	110 m hurdles

Freddie Crittenden III (born 3 August 1994) is a retired American athlete who specializes in the 110 metres hurdles. He won the silver medal in the 110 meters hurdles at the 2019 Pan American Games.

== Hurdling career ==
Crittenden attended Utica High School in Shelby Township, Michigan. He ran for Syracuse University. At the end of this time at Syracuse he was a two-time First Team All-American and two-time Second Team All-American, and was named to the All-ACC team six times.

Crittenden trains in Phoenix, Arizona with the Phoenix Track Club. He is sponsored by Adidas and works a full-time job with an after-school care nonprofit. He received a $10,000 donation for training, healthcare, and travel from Boomerang Capital Partners through USATF's "Adopt an Athlete" program. In July 2024, he signed a contract with Adidas.

Crittenden took 2nd at the 2024 US Olympic trials in the 110m hurdles to earn his first spot on an Olympic team, heading to Paris.

In December 2024, it was announced that he had signed up for the inaugural season of the Michael Johnson-founded Grand Slam Track.

== Personal life ==
Crittenden has seven siblings and is married to Tor Hawley Crittenden. He and his wife have a daughter who was born in July 2024. In 2026, he announced his retirement and has since pursued teaching and other ventures.

== Championship results ==
Grand Slam Track results
Slam	Race group	Event	Pl.	Time	Prize money
2025 Kingston Slam	Short hurdles	110 m hurdles	3rd	13.35	US$20,000
2025 Kingston Slam	Short hurdles	100 m	8th	10.97	US$20,000
2025 Miami Slam	Short hurdles	110 m hurdles	3rd	13.09	US$25,000
2025 Miami Slam	Short hurdles	100 m	7th	10.68	US$25,000
2025 Philadelphia Slam	Short hurdles	110 m hurdles	6th	13.58	US$12,500
2025 Philadelphia Slam	Short hurdles	100 m	7th	10.96	US$12,500

All results taken from World Athletics profile

Year	Meet	Venue	Event	Place	Time
2014	NCAA Championships	Hayward Field	110m hurdles	H1	13.81
2014	USATF Championships	Hornet Stadium	110m hurdles	SF1 8th	20.92
2014	NACAC U23 Championships	Hillside Stadium	110m hurdles	4th	13.89
2015	NCAA Championships	Hayward Field	110m hurdles	SF1 6th	13.63
2015	USATF Championships	Hayward Field	110m hurdles	SF2 6th	13.62
2016	NCAA Indoor Championships	Birmingham CrossPlex	60m hurdles	2nd	7.64
2016	NCAA Championships	Hayward Field	110m hurdles	4th	13.70
2016	USATF Championships	Hayward Field	110m hurdles	SF3 5th	13.87
2016	NACAC U23 Championships	Jorge Gonzalez National Stadium	110m hurdles	1st	13.53
2017	NCAA Indoor Championships	Gilliam Indoor Track Stadium	60m hurdles	2nd	7.67
2018	USATF Championships	Drake Stadium	110m hurdles	SF2 8th	18.07
2019	USATF Championships	Drake Stadium	110m hurdles	4th	13.39
2019	Pan American Games	Villa Deportiva Nacional	110m hurdles	2nd	13.32
2019	IAAF World Relays	International Stadium	Shuttle hurdle relays	1st	54.96
2021	USATF Championships	Hayward Field	110m hurdles	SF2 6th	13.63
2022	USATF Championships	Hayward Field	110m hurdles	SF2 4th	13.35
2022	NACAC Championships	Grand Bahama Sports Complex	110m hurdles	1st	13.00
2023	USATF Indoor Championships	Albuquerque Convention Center	60m hurdles	1st	7.49
2023	USATF Championships	Hayward Field	110m hurdles	3rd	13.23
2023	World Championships	National Athletics Centre	110m hurdles	4th	13.16
2024	USATF Indoor Championships	Albuquerque Convention Center	60m hurdles	7th	7.58
2024	USATF Championships	Hayward Field	110m hurdles	2nd	12.93

=== Track records ===
As of 14 September 2024, Crittenden holds the following track records for 110 metres hurdles.

Location	Time	Windspeed m/s	Date
Nassau	13.00	+ 0.3	20/08/2022
Phoenix, AZ	13.19	+ 1.6	23/04/2023
