= NACAC Championships =

Continental track and field athletics event

The North American, Central American and Caribbean Championships is a continental track and field athletics event organised by the North American, Central American and Caribbean Athletic Association. The last of the six IAAF areas to hold a continental senior athletics competition, the NACAC Championships' inaugural edition was held in 2007 in San Salvador, El Salvador. Three hundred athletes competed at the 2007 Championships and a total of 26 nations were represented. The United States dominated the first edition with a total of 43 medals, including 28 gold medals. Mexico and Trinidad and Tobago took second and third places with totals of 20 and 11 medals, respectively.

== Editions ==
Edition	Year	City	Country	Date	Venue	Events	Nations	Athletes	Top of the medal table
1	2007	San Salvador	El Salvador	July 13–15	Estadio Jorge "Mágico" González	42	26	275	United States
2	2015	San José	Costa Rica	August 7–9	Estadio Nacional de Costa Rica	38	31	369	United States
3	2018	Toronto	Canada	August 10–12	Varsity Stadium/Toronto Islands	42	31	319	United States
4	2022	Freeport	Bahamas	August 19–21	Grand Bahama Sports Complex	45	26	329	United States
5	2025	Freeport	Bahamas	August 15–17	Grand Bahama Sports Complex	39			United States

== Records ==
=== Men ===
Event	Record	Name	Nationality	Date	Championships	Place	Ref.
100 m	9.95 (−0.4 m/s)	Jerome Blake	Canada	15 August 2025	2025 Championships	Freeport, Bahamas	
200 m	19.87 (+0.6 m/s)	Andrew Hudson	Jamaica	21 August 2022	2022 Championships	Freeport, Bahamas	
400 m	44.48	Kirani James	Grenada	17 August 2025	2025 Championships	Freeport, Bahamas	
800 m	1:42.87	Handal Roban	Saint Vincent and the Grenadines	16 August 2025	2025 Championships	Freeport, Bahamas	
1500 m	3:37.54	Foster Malleck	Canada	16 August 2025	2025 Championships	Freeport, Bahamas	
5000 m	13:57.53	Lopez Lomong	United States	8 August 2015	2015 Championships	San Jose, Costa Rica	
10,000 m	29:23.77	Sean McGorty	United States	19 August 2022	2022 Championships	Freeport, Bahamas	
110 m hurdles	13.00 (+0.3 m/s)	Freddie Crittenden	United States	20 August 2022	2022 Championships	Freeport, Bahamas	
400 m hurdles	47.34	Kyron McMaster	British Virgin Islands	21 August 2022	2022 Championships	Freeport, Bahamas	
3000 m steeplechase	8:14.07	Daniel Michalski	United States	17 August 2025	2025 Championships	Freeport, Bahamas	
High jump	2.28 m (7 ft 5 3/4 in)	Jeron Robinson	United States	11 August 2018	2018 Championships	Toronto, Canada	
Pole vault	5.45 m (17 ft 10 1/2 in)	Scott Houston	United States	12 August 2018	2018 Championships	Toronto, Canada	
Long jump	8.29 m (27 ft 2 1/4 in) (−0.4 m/s)	Marquis Dendy	United States	12 August 2018	2018 Championships	Toronto, Canada	
Triple jump	16.98 m (55 ft 8 1/2 in) (+1.4 m/s)	Yordany Durañona	Dominica	7 August 2015	2015 Championships	San Jose, Costa Rica	
Shot put	21.68 m (71 ft 1 1/2 in)	Darrell Hill	United States	10 August 2018	2018 Championships	Toronto, Canada	
Shot put	21.68 m (71 ft 1 1/2 in)	Josh Awotunde	United States	15 August 2025	2025 Championships	Freeport, Bahamas	
Discus throw	68.47 m (224 ft 7 1/2 in)	Fedrick Dacres	Jamaica	12 August 2018	2018 Championships	Toronto, Canada	
Hammer throw	72.94 m (239 ft 3 1/2 in)	Roberto Sawyers	Costa Rica	11 August 2018	2018 Championships	Toronto, Canada	
Javelin throw	87.24 m (286 ft 2 1/2 in)	Curtis Thompson	United States	17 August 2025	2025 Championships	Freeport, Bahamas	
Decathlon	8038 pts	Austin West	United States	15–16 August 2025	2025 Championships	Freeport, Bahamas	
Decathlon	100m / Long jump / Shot put / High jump / 400m / 110m H / Discus / Pole vault / Javelin / 1500m; 10.90 (−0.5 m/s) / 7.24 m (+1.1 m/s) / 14.55 m / 2.04 m / 47.17 / 15.08 (−0.5 m/s) / 42.04 m / 4.60 m / 61.48 m / 4:47.16						
20,000 m walk (track)	1:26:21.08	José Ortiz	Guatemala	20 August 2022	2022 Championships	Freeport, Bahamas	
4 × 100 m relay	38.05	Aaron Brown; Jerome Blake; Brendon Rodney; Eliezer Adjibi	Canada	17 August 2025	2025 Championships	Freeport, Bahamas	
4 × 400 m relay	3:00.07	Clayton Parros; Calvin Smith; Marcus Chambers; James Harris	United States	9 August 2015	2015 Championships	San Jose, Costa Rica	

=== Women ===
Event	Record	Name	Nationality	Date	Championships	Place	Ref.
100 m	10.83 (−0.1 m/s)	Shericka Jackson	Jamaica	20 August 2022	2022 Championships	Freeport, Bahamas	
200 m	22.35 (+0.3 m/s)	Brittany Brown	United States	21 August 2022	2022 Championships	Freeport, Bahamas	
400 m	49.40	Shaunae Miller-Uibo	Bahamas	20 August 2022	2022 Championships	Freeport, Bahamas	
800 m	1:57.52	Ajeé Wilson	United States	11 August 2018	2018 Championships	Toronto, Canada	
1500 m	4:04.53	Heather MacLean	United States	21 August 2022	2022 Championships	Freeport, Bahamas	
5000 m	15:11.68	Natosha Rogers	United States	19 August 2022	2022 Championships	Freeport, Bahamas	
10,000 m	32:19.84	Taylor Roe	United States	15 August 2025	2025 Championships	Freeport, Bahamas	
100 m hurdles	12.55 (+0.9 m/s)	Kendra Harrison	United States	11 August 2018	2018 Championships	Toronto, Canada	
400 m hurdles	53.32	Shamier Little	United States	12 August 2018	2018 Championships	Toronto, Canada	
3000 m steeplechase	9:34.36	Gabrielle Jennings	United States	19 August 2022	2022 Championships	Freeport, Bahamas	
High jump	1.92 m (6 ft 3 1/2 in)	Vashti Cunningham	United States	19 August 2022	2022 Championships	Freeport, Bahamas	
Pole vault	4.75 m (15 ft 7 in)	Katie Nageotte	United States	11 August 2018	2018 Championships	Toronto, Canada	
Long jump	6.93 m (22 ft 8 3/4 in) (+2.0 m/s)	Quanesha Burks	United States	8 August 2015	2015 Championships	San Jose, Costa Rica	
Triple jump	14.49 m (47 ft 6 1/4 in) (+1.5 m/s)	Thea LaFond	Dominica	21 August 2022	2022 Championships	Freeport, Bahamas	
Shot put	20.15 m (66 ft 1 1/4 in)	Sarah Mitton	Canada	21 August 2022	2022 Championships	Freeport, Bahamas	
Discus throw	63.18 m (207 ft 3 1/4 in)	Laulauga Tausaga-Collins	United States	19 August 2022	2022 Championships	Freeport, Bahamas	
Hammer throw	74.60 m (244 ft 9 in)	DeAnna Price	United States	10 August 2018	2018 Championships	Toronto, Canada	
Javelin throw	64.68 m (212 ft 2 1/4 in)	Kara Winger	United States	21 August 2022	2022 Championships	Freeport, Bahamas	
20,000 m walk (track)	1:36:15.88	Rachell De Orbeta	Puerto Rico	16 August 2025	2025 Championships	Freeport, Bahamas	
4 × 100 m relay	42.24	Barbara Pierre; Lekeisha Lawson; Dezerea Bryant; Kyra Jefferson	United States	9 August 2015	2015 Championships	San Jose, Costa Rica	
4 × 400 m relay	3:23.54	Kaylin Whitney; Kyra Jefferson; A'Keyla Mitchell; Jaide Stepter-Baynes	United States	21 August 2022	2022 Championships	Freeport, Bahamas	

=== Mixed ===
Event	Record	Name	Nationality	Date	Championships	Place	Ref.
4 × 400 m relay	3:11.10	Bovel McPherson; Leah Anderson; Zandrian Barnes; Stacey Williams	Jamaica	16 August 2025	2025 Championships	Freeport, Bahamas	

== Medal table ==
Rank	Nation	Gold	Silver	Bronze	Total
1	United States	125	79	49	253
2	Jamaica	28	35	27	90
3	Canada	10	16	25	51
4	Trinidad and Tobago	6	9	12	27
5	Cuba	6	8	10	24
6	Mexico	4	19	8	31
7	El Salvador	4	2	2	8
8	Bahamas	3	7	14	24
9	Guatemala	3	4	6	13
10	Saint Lucia	3	0	3	6
11	Puerto Rico	2	4	14	20
12	Dominica	2	1	2	5
13	British Virgin Islands	2	1	1	4
14	Grenada	2	0	2	4
15	Dominican Republic	1	5	4	10
16	Barbados	1	3	8	12
17	Saint Vincent and the Grenadines	1	3	1	5
18	Costa Rica	1	2	6	9
19	Saint Kitts and Nevis	1	1	2	4
20	Honduras	1	0	1	2
21	Antigua and Barbuda	0	1	1	2
21	Haiti	0	1	1	2
23	Belize	0	1	0	1
23	Bermuda	0	1	0	1
25	Nicaragua	0	0	1	1
25	Turks and Caicos Islands	0	0	1	1
25	U.S. Virgin Islands	0	0	1	1
Totals (27 entries)		206	203	202	611
