= Naomi Sedney =

Dutch sprinter (born 1994)

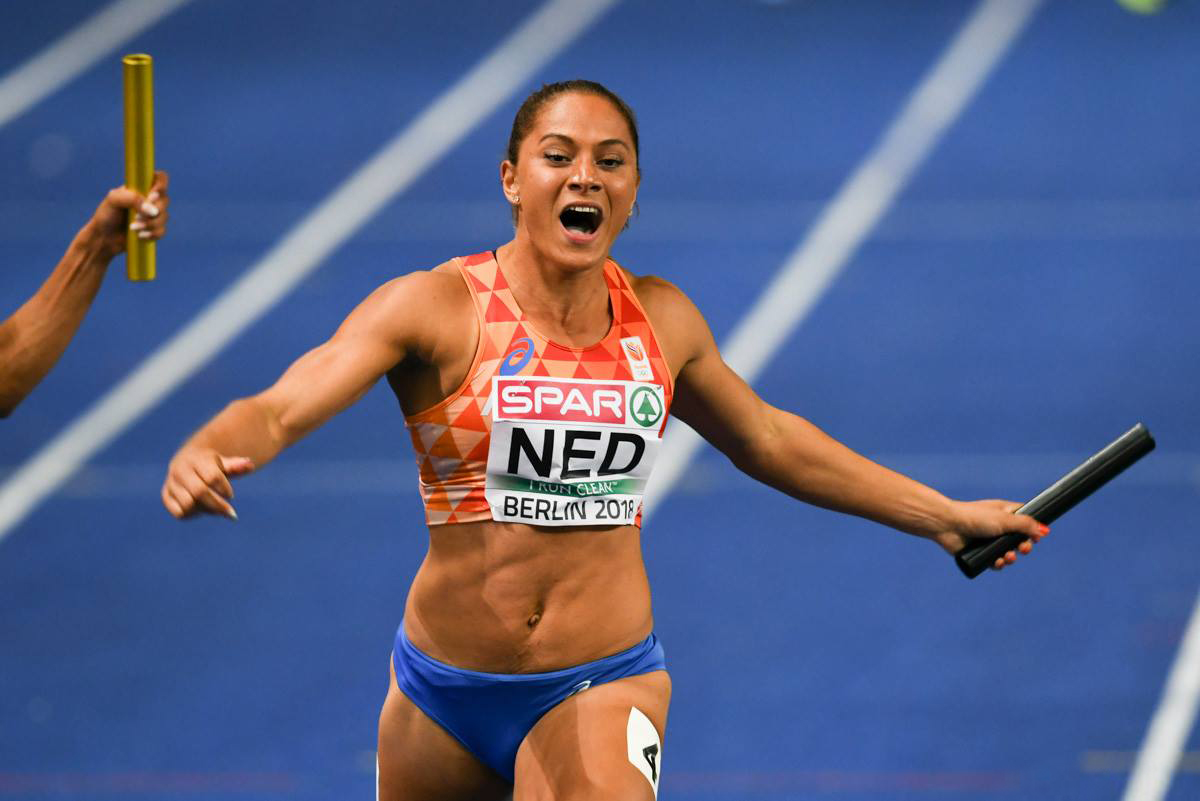
- Sedney at the 2018 European Championships

Personal information
- Born: 17 December 1994 (age 31) Zoetermeer, Netherlands
- Height: 1.70 m (5 ft 7 in)
- Weight: 65 kg (143 lb)

Sport
- Sport: Athletics
- Event: 100 metres
- Club: ARV Ilion
Medal record
Women's athletics
Representing the Netherlands
World Relays
Bronze medal – third place	2021 Chorzów	4 × 100 m relay
European Championships
Gold medal – first place	2016 Amsterdam	4 × 100 m relay
Silver medal – second place	2018 Berlin	4 × 100 m relay
European Junior Championships
Bronze medal – third place	2013 Rieti	4 × 100 m relay
European Youth Olympic Festival
Gold medal – first place	2011 Trabzon	4 × 100 m relay

Naomi Sedney (born 17 December 1994) is a Dutch sprinter. She has been most successful as the anchor of the Dutch Relay team and is co-holder of the national record 4 × 100 m relay. In 2022 her younger sister Zoë Sedney joined her in the Dutch Relay team.

== Early career ==
Sedney started competing in Athletics at the age of eight at the track and field club ARV Ilion in Zoetermeer. Her introduction to the international field was in at the 2011 European Youth Olympic Festival in Trabzon where she represented the Netherlands, winning gold in the 4 × 100 metres relay with the Dutch Relay team (Tessa van Schagen, Sedney, Sacha van Agt and Nadine Visser).

A year later she competed at the 2012 World Junior Championships in Barcelona, placing sixth in the 4 × 100 meters relay with the Dutch team (Schagen, Sedney, Miquella Lobo and Marloes Duijn).

In 2013 she won bronze with the Dutch relay team (Schagen, Sedney, Van Agt and Eefje Boons) at the European Junior Championships in Rieti.

== Breakthrough at senior level ==
In 2015 Sedney improved her personal best at the 100 metres to 11.34 (+1,8 m/s) at the FBK Games in Hengelo on 24 May; this turned out to be enough to qualify for the 100 metres and the 4 × 100 metres relay at both the 2015 European U23 Championships in Tallinn and the 2015 World Championships in Athletics in Beijing (China). At the European U23 Championships she finished fourth in both the 100 metres with a time of 11,62 and the relay with the Dutch team (Schagen, Van Agt, Sedney and Boons). At the World Championships Sedney stranded in the heats of the 100 metres, finishing fourth in her heat. The Dutch 4 × 100 meters relay team (Visser, Dafne Schippers, Sedney and Jamile Samuel) finished fifth in 42.32, but was disqualified for a changeover infringement. In the heats the team had also run 42.32, a new national record.

In 2016 Sedney competed at the 2016 European Athletics Championships in Amsterdam in both the 100 metres and the 4 × 100 metres relay. In the 100 m she made it to the semi-finals where her time of 11.44 was not enough to advance to the finals. The Dutch relay team led by Schippers, with Samuel, Van Schagen and Sedney as anchor runner won the 4 × 100 meters relay with a national record of 42.04.

At the 2016 Summer Olympics Sedney was selected for the Dutch relay team, they were eliminated in the heats due to a botched relay handover between Samuel and Schippers.

In 2017 Sedney was part of the 4 × 100 metres Dutch Relay team (Madiea Ghafoor, Schippers, Sedney, Samuel) at 2017 World Championships in Athletics in London where they finished 8th. Individually Sedney competed in the 100 metres, where she stranded in the heats finishing 30th.

In 2018 Sedney won silver with the 4 × 100 m relay team (Marije van Hunenstijn, Schippers, Samuel and Sedney)at the 2018 European Athletics Championships at the Olympiastadion in Berlin, Germany. Individually she competed in the 100 metres, where she made it to the semi-finals finishing 18th overall.

In 2019 at the 2019 World Championships in Doha was part of the Dutch 4 × 100 metres Relay Team (Nargélis Statia Pieter, Van Hunenstijn, Samuel, Sedney). They stranded in the heats, finishing 9th overall.

In 2021 Sedney became national indoor champion 60 m in a time of 7.28, hereby qualifying for her first international indoor championships. At the European Indoor Championships in Toruń, Poland Sedney made it to the semi-finals finishing 18th overall. Outdoor Sedney competed with the Dutch relay team in both the World Relays in Chorzów, Poland and her second Olympic Games in Tokyo, Japan. In Poland the Dutch team (Samuel, Schippers, Visser, Sedney) became third after a bad handover between Vissers and Sedney eliminated their chances for the gold. At the Olympics a failed handover between Visser and Schippers in the final lead to a DNF for the Dutch relay team (Visser, Schippers, Van Hunnestijn, Sedney).

In 2022 Sedney competed in both the World Championships in Eugene and the European Championships in Munich. In Eugene the Dutch 4 × 100 metres relay team (Andrea Bouma, Zoë Sedney, Minke Bisschops and Naomi Sedney) stranded in the heats, finishing 6th in their heat and 13th overall. In Munich the Dutch 4 × 100 metres relay team (N'Ketia Seedo, Zoë Sedney, Samuel and Naomi Sedney) finished 5th overall.

In 2023 Sedney wasn't selected to compete in an international tournament. With a 100 meters seasons best of 11.41 she was the 7th best in the Dutch Rankings.

In 2024 Sedney was selected for the Dutch 4 x 100 meters replay team for both the European Championships in Rome and the Olympics Games in Paris. She did not run.

== International competitions ==
Year	Competition	Venue	Position	Event	Notes
Representing the Netherlands
2011	European Youth Olympic Festival	Trabzon, Turkey	1st	4 × 100 m relay	45.93
2012	World Junior Championships	Barcelona, Spain	6th	4 × 100 m relay	45.22
2013	European Junior Championships	Rieti, Italy	3rd	4 × 100 m relay	44.22
2015	European U23 Championships	Tallinn, Estonia	4th	100 m	11.62
2015	European U23 Championships	Tallinn, Estonia	4th	4 × 100 m relay	44.46
2015	World Championships	Beijing, China	30th (h)	100 m	11.41
2015	World Championships	Beijing, China	DQ (f)	4 × 100 m relay	DQ
2016	European Championships	Amsterdam, Netherlands	10th (sf)	100 m	11.44
2016	European Championships	Amsterdam, Netherlands	1st	4 × 100 m relay	42.04
2016	Olympic Games	Rio de Janeiro, Brazil	10th (h)	4 × 100 m relay	42.88
2017	World Relays	Nassau, Bahamas	4th	4 × 100 m relay	43.11
2017	World Championships	London, United Kingdom	30th (h)	100 m	11.43
2017	World Championships	London, United Kingdom	8th	4 × 100 m relay	43.07
2018	European Championships	Berlin, Germany	18th (sf)	100 m	11.42
2018	European Championships	Berlin, Germany	2nd	4 × 100 m relay	42.15
2019	World Championships	Doha, Qatar	9th (h)	4 × 100 m relay	43.01
2021	European Indoor Championships	Toruń, Poland	18th (sf)	60 m	7.35
2021	World Relays	Chorzów, Poland	3rd	4 × 100 m relay	44.10
2021	Olympic Games	Tokyo, Japan	DNF (f)	4 × 100 m relay	DNF
2022	World Championships	Eugene, Oregon	13th (h)	4 × 100 m relay	43.46
2022	European Championships	Munich, Germany	5th	4 × 100 m relay	43.03

== Personal bests ==
Outdoor

- 100 metres – 11.24 (+0.2 m/s Gainesville 2018)
- 200 metres – 23.42 (-0.50 m/s, Tübingen 2017)

Indoor

- 60 metres – 7.22 (Apeldoorn 2018)
- 200 metres – 23.46 (Apeldoorn 2016)
