= Kiara Parker =

American sprinter

Personal information
- Nationality: American
- Born: October 28, 1996 (age 29)

Sport
- Country: United States
- Sport: Track and field
- Event: Sprinting
Medal record
Women's athletics
World Championships
Bronze medal – third place	2019 Doha	4×100 m relay
NACAC Championships
Gold medal – first place	2018 Toronto	4×100 m relay

Kiara Parker (born October 28, 1996) is an American track and field athlete who specializes in sprint. She represented the United States at the 2019 World Athletics Championships, winning a bronze medal in 4 × 100 metres relay.

After an undefeated senior season at Westlake High School in Waldorf, Maryland, Parker enrolled at the University of Arkansas. Competing in the indoor and outdoor sprints, Kiara was an eight time All-American for the Razorbacks. As of 2019, she is the school record holder in both the 100m meters (11.02) and 60 meters (7.15).

She is sponsored by Asics.
