= Nargélis Statia Pieter =

Dutch sprinter

Personal information
- Nationality: Dutch
- Born: 25 April 1997 (age 28)

Sport
- Sport: Athletics
- Event: Sprinting

Nargélis Statia Pieter (born 25 April 1997) is a Dutch athlete. She competed in the women's 4 × 100 metres relay event at the 2019 World Athletics Championships.
