= Morolake Akinosun =

American track runner

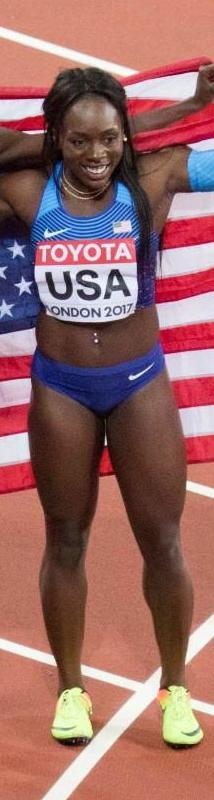

Personal information
- Nationality: Nigerian/American
- Born: May 17, 1994 (age 32) Lagos, Nigeria
- Education: University of Illinois, University of Texas
- Height: 5 ft 4 in (163 cm)
- Weight: 133 lb (60 kg)

Sport
- Country: United States
- Sport: Track and field
- Event: Sprinting
Medal record
Representing the United States
Olympic Games
| Gold medal – first place | 2016 Rio de Janeiro | 4 × 100 m relay |
World Championships
| Gold medal – first place | 2017 London | 4 × 100 m relay |
| Bronze medal – third place | 2019 Doha | 4 × 100 m relay |
Pan American Games
| Gold medal – first place | 2015 Toronto | 4 × 100 m relay |

Morolake Akinosun (born May 17, 1994) is a Nigerian-born American former track runner who competed at the 2016 Summer Olympics in Rio de Janeiro. She won a team gold medal at the 2015 Pan-American Games in Toronto in the 4 × 100-meter relay. She is only the second woman ever to score in four events at an NCAA Outdoor Championships in consecutive seasons. She is a four time NCAA 4 × 100 champion. Akinosun won a gold medal at the 2013 USA Junior Championships, in the 100 m (11.64).

== Rio 2016 Summer Olympics ==
Akinosun was part of the gold medal winning 100-meter relay team, with Tianna Bartoletta, Allyson Felix, and English Gardner. She was replaced for the final by Tori Bowie after having run in two qualifying races.

== NCAA ==
Morolake Akinosun is a Texas Longhorns track and field alum and won 13 Big 12 Conference titles. Morolake Akinosun is a 13-time USTFCCCA NCAA Division I First-Team All-American (11 at Texas; 2 at Illinois) and 9-time USTFCCCA Second-Team All-American (5 at Texas; 4 at Illinois).

| Year | Big 12 Conference Indoor | NCAA Division I Indoor | Big 12 Conference Outdoor | NCAA Division I Outdoor |
|---|---|---|---|---|
| 2015–16 | 60 metres 7.30 1st | 60 metres 7.21 4th | 100 metres 11.32 w(0.1) 1st | 100 metres 11.07 w(2.6) 3rd |
| 2015–16 | 200 metres 23.33 5th | 200 metres 23.35 9th | 200009 | 200 metres 22.54 w(1.9) 4th |
| 2014–15 | 60 metres 7.23 1st | 60 metres 7.33 9th | 100 metres 11.00 w(3.5) 1st | 100 metres 10.97 w(3.1) 2nd |
| 2014–15 | 200 metres 23.37 2nd | 200 metres 23.69 14th | 200 metres 22.68 w(3.5) 1st | 200 metres 22.52 w(1.9) 5th |
| 2013–14 | 60 metres 7.29 1st | 60 metres 7.23 4th | 100 metres 10.96 w(2.6) 1st | 100 metres 11.33 w(−3.4) 2nd |
| 2013–14 | 200 metres 23.54 2nd | 200 metres 23.78 14th | 200 metres 22.17 (w) w(4.3) 1st | 200 metres 22.89 w(2.2) 5th |

Morolake Akinosun as an Illinois Fighting Illini freshman won a Big Ten Conference in 60 meters in 2013.

| Year | Big Ten Conference Indoor | NCAA Division I Indoor | Big Ten Conference Outdoor | NCAA Division I Outdoor |
|---|---|---|---|---|
| 2012–13 | 60 metres 7.32 1st | 60 metres 7.39 14th | 100 metres 11.36 w(2.6) 2nd | 100 metres 11.41 w(0.9) 8th |
| 2012–13 | 200 metres 23.47 2nd | 200 metres 23.55 12th | 200 metres 24.49 w(2.6) 8th | 200 metres 23.52 w(2.7) 19th |

== Prep ==
Morolake Akinosun earned all state Illinois High School Association honors four years (2009, 10, 11, 12) for Waubonsie Valley High School.

In 2012, Akinosun was 100 m Illinois state 3A champion in 11.41 US#2 IL#1 w(1.7).

In 2011, Akinosun titled in the AAU Junior Olympic Games 100 m (11.62 w(−1.3)) and 200 m (23.73 w(−2.1)). In the 2011 AAU Junior Olympic semi-final, Akinosun ran 100 meters in 11.42 US#5 IL#1 pre w(1.2) and 200 meters in 23.49 US#6 IL#1 pre w(−1.8).

| Year | Illinois High School Association Outdoor |
|---|---|
| 2011–12 | 100 metres 11.41 w(1.7) 1st |
| 2011–12 | 200 metres 24.34 w(−0.9) 3rd |
| 2010–11 | 100 metres 11.61 w(1.6) 2nd |
| 2009–10 | 100 metres 11.97 4th |
| 2009–10 | 200 metres 24.90 5th |

== Personal life ==
Morolake is of Yoruba Nigerian descent. Morolake was born in Lagos, Nigeria. She migrated to the United States with her family just 2 years after she was born. She is the middle child of three girls. She announced her retirement from professional track in 2024 and is currently leading athlete relations at Grand Slam Track.
