= Grand Bahama Sports Complex =

Stadium in the city of Freeport in the Bahamas

Coordinates: 26.543351°N 78.676022°W

- Interactive map of Grand Bahama Sports Complex
- Full name: Grand Bahama Sports Complex
- Location: Freeport, Grand Bahama, Bahamas
- Owner: Government of the Bahamas
- Operator: Ministry of Youth, Sports and Culture
- Capacity: 3,100
- Surface: Athletics track (Mondo) and grass field

Construction
- Opened: 1999

Tenants
- Local athletics and football events

Grand Bahama Stadium is a stadium in the city of Freeport in the Bahamas. The stadium is mostly used for football and athletics. This is the principal stadium on the island of Grand Bahama.

Grand Bahama Stadium, in its normal configuration, has room for 3,100 spectators.

== History ==
The Grand Bahama Sports Complex opened in 1999 in an effort to expand sporting infrastructure on Grand Bahama. The facility was developed to support athletics training and competition on the island. Since its opening, the complex has been used for national championships, school competitions, and regional meets.

In the 2020s, plans were announced for further development in the surrounding area, including the construction of an aquatics centre to expand the complex into a broader multi-sport hub.

== Events ==
The Grand Bahama Sports Complex has hosted a range of athletics competitions at local, national, and regional levels. It regularly hosts Bahamian national track and field championships and school-level competitions.

The complex has also hosted editions of the NACAC Championships, bringing together athletes from across North America, Central America, and the Caribbean. These events represent some of the highest-level international competitions held on Grand Bahama.

In addition to athletics, the venue is occasionally used for association football matches and community sporting events.
