= 2019 NACAC U23 Championships in Athletics – Results =

These are the results of the 2019 NACAC U23 Championships in Athletics which took place on July 5, 6, and 7 at the Parque Queretaro 2000 in Querétaro City, Mexico.

== Men's results ==
=== 100 meters ===
Heats – July 5
Wind:
Heat 1: ? m/s, Heat 2: 0.0 m/s, Heat 3: 0.0 m/s

Rank	Heat	Name	Nationality	Time	Notes
1	2	Waseem Williams	Jamaica	10.15	Q
2	1	Mario Burke	Barbados	10.19	Q
3	2	Samson Colebrooke	Bahamas	10.20	Q
4	1	Jerod Elcock	Trinidad and Tobago	10.25	Q
5	3	Rodney Rowe	United States	10.36	Q
6	3	Raheem Chambers	Jamaica	10.36	Q
7	3	Luxon Glor	Canada	10.54	q
8	1	Hector Allen	Costa Rica	10.59	q
9	1	Darrell Singleton	United States	10.63	
10	2	Stephan Charles	Saint Lucia	10.67	
11	3	Coull Graham	Antigua and Barbuda	10.93	
12	2	Stephan Dill	Bermuda	10.97	
13	1	Emmanuel Agenor	Turks and Caicos Islands	11.00	
14	2	Joshire Stanley	Belize	11.26	
15	3	Mario Lozano	Mexico	11.33	
	3	José Andrés Salazar	El Salvador	DNF	
	2	Brandon Heredia	Mexico	DQ	

Final – July 5
Wind:
+1.1 m/s

Rank	Lane	Name	Nationality	Time	Notes
1st place, gold medalist(s)	5	Waseem Williams	Jamaica	10.01	CR, 10.002
2nd place, silver medalist(s)	3	Samson Colebrooke	Bahamas	10.01	CR, 10.004
3rd place, bronze medalist(s)	6	Mario Burke	Barbados	10.01	CR, 10.010
4	8	Raheem Chambers	Jamaica	10.13	
5	7	Jerod Elcock	Trinidad and Tobago	10.17	
6	4	Rodney Rowe	United States	10.23	
7	2	Luxon Glor	Canada	10.33	
8	1	Hector Allen	Costa Rica	10.59	

=== 200 meters ===
Heats – July 6
Wind:
Heat 1: +2.8 m/s, Heat 2: +0.3 m/s, Heat 3: +2.6 m/s

Rank	Heat	Name	Nationality	Time	Notes
1	2	Micaiah Harris	United States	20.40	Q
2	3	Samson Colebrooke	Bahamas	20.40	Q
3	1	Mario Burke	Barbados	20.45	Q
4	3	Rodney Rowe	United States	20.52	Q
5	1	Jerod Elcock	Trinidad and Tobago	20.67	Q
6	1	Hujaye Cornwall	Jamaica	20.71	q
7	3	José Andrés Salazar	El Salvador	20.90	q
8	3	Michali Everett	Jamaica	20.90	
9	2	Colby Jennings	Turks and Caicos Islands	21.37	Q
10	3	Alejandro González	Mexico	21.59	
11	1	Daniel Martínez	Mexico	21.60	
12	3	Kashief Dawkins	Cayman Islands	21.82	
13	1	Stephan Charles	Saint Lucia	21.85	
14	2	Joshire Stanley	Belize	21.91	
15	2	Rodney Griffin	United States Virgin Islands	21.95	
16	1	Stephan Dill	Bermuda	21.96	
	2	José Humberto Bermúdez	Guatemala	DQ	

Final – July 7
Wind:
+0.8 m/s

Rank	Name	Nationality	Time	Notes
1st place, gold medalist(s)	Samson Colebrooke	Bahamas	20.58	
2nd place, silver medalist(s)	Jerod Elcock	Trinidad and Tobago	20.65	
3rd place, bronze medalist(s)	Micaiah Harris	United States	20.74	
4	Rodney Rowe	United States	20.79	
5	Hujaye Cornwall	Jamaica	20.90	
6	José Andrés Salazar	El Salvador	21.37	
7	Colby Jennings	Turks and Caicos Islands	21.49	
	Mario Burke	Barbados	DQ	

=== 400 meters ===
Heats – July 5

Rank	Heat	Name	Nationality	Time	Notes
1	1	Trevor Stewart	United States	45.27	Q
2	2	Wilbert London	United States	46.47	Q
3	1	Terry Thomas	Jamaica	46.41	Q
4	2	Khamal Stewart-Baynes	Canada	46.81	Q
5	1	Austin Cole	Canada	46.63	Q
6	2	Martin Manley	Jamaica	47.50	Q
7	2	José Humberto Bermúdez	Guatemala	47.67	q
8	1	Adriano Gumbs	British Virgin Islands	47.68	q
9	1	Rodney Griffin	United States Virgin Islands	47.69	
10	2	Colby Jennings	Turks and Caicos Islands	48.84	
11	1	Jesús Pablo Mares	Mexico	49.00	
12	2	Julio Saul Díaz	Mexico	49.66	

Final – July 6

Rank	Lane	Name	Nationality	Time	Notes
1st place, gold medalist(s)	4	Trevor Stewart	United States	45.01	
2nd place, silver medalist(s)	5	Wilbert London	United States	45.41	
3rd place, bronze medalist(s)	7	Austin Cole	Canada	45.90	
4	3	Terry Thomas	Jamaica	46.08	
5	6	Khamal Stewart-Baynes	Canada	47.04	
6	8	Martin Manley	Jamaica	47.34	
7	2	José Humberto Bermúdez	Guatemala	47.55	
8	1	Adriano Gumbs	British Virgin Islands	48.87	

=== 800 meters ===
July 6

Rank	Name	Nationality	Time	Notes
1st place, gold medalist(s)	Devin Dixon	United States	1:47.69	
2nd place, silver medalist(s)	Isaiah Jewett	United States	1:49.43	
3rd place, bronze medalist(s)	Jauavney James	Jamaica	1:49.52	
4	Jorge Arturo Montes	Mexico	1:49.79	
5	Cebastian Gentil	Haiti	1:54.63	
6	Jesús Tonatiu López	Mexico	1:55.87	
7	Mohand Khelaf	Canada	1:58.07	

=== 1500 meters ===
July 7

Rank	Name	Nationality	Time	Notes
1st place, gold medalist(s)	Cade Bethmann	United States	4:02.84	
2nd place, silver medalist(s)	Victor Ortiz	Puerto Rico	4:03.39	
3rd place, bronze medalist(s)	Cristian García	Mexico	4:03.71	
4	Orlando Cuevas	Mexico	4:05.02	
5	César Peraza	El Salvador	4:11.32	
6	Alexandre Gauthierot	Guadeloupe	4:12.43	

=== 5000 meters ===
July 5

Rank	Name	Nationality	Time	Notes
1st place, gold medalist(s)	Erick Cayetano	Mexico	15:19.84	
2nd place, silver medalist(s)	Jonathan del Razo	Mexico	15:22.39	
	Alexandre Gauthierot	Guadeloupe	DNF	

=== 10,000 meters ===
July 7

Rank	Name	Nationality	Time	Notes
1st place, gold medalist(s)	Matt Young	United States	32:46.84	
2nd place, silver medalist(s)	Jesús Nava	Mexico	32:46.84	
3rd place, bronze medalist(s)	Francisco Sánchez	Mexico	33:25.80	

=== 110 meters hurdles ===
Heats – July 5
Wind:
Heat 1: +0.8 m/s, Heat 2: +2.4 m/s

Rank	Heat	Name	Nationality	Time	Notes
1	2	Phillip Lemonious	Jamaica	13.56	Q
2	1	Dashaun Jackson	United States	13.70	Q
3	2	Michael Nicholls	Barbados	13.77	Q
4	1	Rohan Cole	Jamaica	13.78	Q
5	1	Rasheem Brown	Cayman Islands	13.88	Q
6	2	Wienstan Mena	Guatemala	14.23	Q
7	2	Anastas Eliopoulos	Canada	14.43	q
8	1	Pablo Picasso	Mexico	14.77	q
9	2	Héctor Herrera	Mexico	14.84	

Final – July 5
Wind:
+2.7 m/s

Rank	Lane	Name	Nationality	Time	Notes
1st place, gold medalist(s)	4	Phillip Lemonious	Jamaica	13.47	
2nd place, silver medalist(s)	6	Rohan Cole	Jamaica	13.55	
3rd place, bronze medalist(s)	5	Dashaun Jackson	United States	13.58	
4	3	Michael Nicholls	Barbados	13.59	
5	8	Wienstan Mena	Guatemala	14.17	
6	7	Rasheem Brown	Cayman Islands	14.37	
7	1	Pablo Picasso	Mexico	14.78	
	2	Anastas Eliopoulos	Canada	DNS	

=== 400 meters hurdles ===
Heats – July 5

Rank	Heat	Name	Nationality	Time	Notes
1	2	Norman Grimes	United States	51.79	Q
2	2	Malique Smith	United States Virgin Islands	51.82	Q
3	2	Pablo Andrés Ibáñez	El Salvador	51.85	Q
4	2	Rivaldo Leacock	Barbados	52.00	q
5	1	Quincy Hall	United States	52.55	Q
6	1	Denzel Villaman	Dominican Republic	52.83	Q
7	1	Shakeem Hall-Smith	Bahamas	53.16	Q
8	1	Osmar Torres	Mexico	54.92	q
9	2	Felipe Gurrola	Mexico	55.69	
10	1	Nicolas Alphonse	Haiti	56.44	

Final – July 5

Rank	Lane	Name	Nationality	Time	Notes
1st place, gold medalist(s)	6	Quincy Hall	United States	49.77	
2nd place, silver medalist(s)	3	Norman Grimes	United States	50.07	
3rd place, bronze medalist(s)	8	Pablo Andrés Ibáñez	El Salvador	50.96	
4	2	Rivaldo Leacock	Barbados	51.18	
5	4	Denzel Villaman	Dominican Republic	51.24	
6	7	Shakeem Hall-Smith	Bahamas	51.64	
7	5	Malique Smith	United States Virgin Islands	52.05	
8	1	Osmar Torres	Mexico	54.35	

=== 3000 meters steeplechase ===
July 6

Rank	Name	Nationality	Time	Notes
1st place, gold medalist(s)	Alex Rogers	United States	9:10.55	
2nd place, silver medalist(s)	John Rice	United States	9:16.29	
3rd place, bronze medalist(s)	Victor Ortiz	Puerto Rico	9:18.92	
4	José Armando Valencia	Mexico	9:23.59	
5	César Daniel Gómez	Mexico	9:24.18	
6	César Peraza	El Salvador	10:25.06	

=== 4 × 100 meters relay ===
July 6

Rank	Lane	Nation	Competitors	Time	Notes
1st place, gold medalist(s)	4	United States	Justin Hall, Holland Martin, Darrell Singleton, Ja'Mari Ward	40.03	
2nd place, silver medalist(s)	6	Bahamas	Tamar Greene, Samson Colebrooke, Holland Martin, Shakeem Hall-Smith	40.33	
	3	Mexico	Mario Lozano, Daniel Martínez, Rodrigo Guzman, Brandon Heredia	DNF	
	5	Jamaica	Raheem Chambers, Michali Everett, Waseem Williams, Rohan Cole	DQ	R170.7

=== 10,000 meters walk ===
July 6

Rank	Name	Nationality	Result	Notes
1st place, gold medalist(s)	Gustavo Solis	Mexico	42:09.49	
2nd place, silver medalist(s)	José Oswaldo Calel	Guatemala	42:55.27	
3rd place, bronze medalist(s)	Saúl Mena	Mexico	44:03.54	
4	Steven Smith	United States	44:37.07	
5	Anthony Gruttadauro	United States	46:43.83	
	Alger Liang	Canada	DQ	

=== High jump ===
July 7

Rank	Name	Nationality	Result	Notes
1st place, gold medalist(s)	Keenon Laine	United States	2.25	
2nd place, silver medalist(s)	Earnest Sears	United States	2.25	
3rd place, bronze medalist(s)	Erik Portillo	Mexico	2.22	
4	Eric Chatten	Canada	2.19	
5	Roberto Vílches	Mexico	2.16	
6	Noel Vanderzee	Canada	2.13	
7	Jyles Etienne	Bahamas	2.10	
8	Kyle Alcine	Bahamas	2.10	
9	Raymond Richards	Jamaica	2.05	
10	Ken Franzua	Guatemala	2.05	

=== Pole vault ===
July 6

Rank	Name	Nationality	4.40	4.55	4.70	4.80	4.90	5.00	5.20	5.30	5.50	5.60	5.70	Result	Notes
1st place, gold medalist(s)	Clayton Fritsch	United States	–	–	–	–	–	–	xo	o	xo	o	xxx	5.60	CR
2nd place, silver medalist(s)	Zachery Bradford	United States	–	–	–	–	–	–	o	o	o	xxo	xxx	5.60	CR
3rd place, bronze medalist(s)	Natán Rivera	El Salvador					xxo	xxx						4.90	
4	Daniel Arellano	Mexico				xxo	xxx							4.80	
5	Christiaan Higueros	Guatemala		xxo	xxx									4.55	
6	Jasiel Silva	Mexico		xxx										4.40	

=== Long jump ===
July 5

Rank	Name	Nationality	#1	#2	#3	#4	#5	#6	Result	Notes
1st place, gold medalist(s)	Andwuelle Wright	Trinidad and Tobago	7.70	7.64	8.25	8.09	7.77	8.25	8.25	CR, NR
2nd place, silver medalist(s)	Shawn-D Thompson	Jamaica	7.34	x	7.62	7.73	8.05w	8.03	8.05w	
3rd place, bronze medalist(s)	Wayne Pinnock	Jamaica	7.65	5.95	7.63	x	7.97	7.75	7.97	
4	Ja'Mari Ward	United States	x	7.63	x	7.95	x	x	7.95	
5	Che Richards	Trinidad and Tobago	7.65	7.40	x	7.74	x	x	7.74	
6	Alejandro Cox	British Virgin Islands	7.61	7.56	7.39	7.31	?	?	7.61	
7	Enzo Hodebar	Guadeloupe	x	7.50	x	x	x	x	7.50	
8	Akeem Bradshaw	British Virgin Islands	7.19	7.25	7.42	6.73	x	7.20	7.42	
9	Justin Hall	United States	7.39	x	x				7.39	
10	Tristan James	Dominica	7.31	x	x				7.31	
11	Jorge Pineda	Mexico	4.14	x	7.26				7.26	
12	Holland Martin	Bahamas	x	7.21	x				7.21	
13	Ever Ponce	Mexico	x	x	6.97				6.97	
14	Wienstan Mena	Guatemala	6.93	x	x				6.93	
15	Mathew Montero	Puerto Rico	4.44	6.83	x				6.83	
16	Wikenson Fenelon	Turks and Caicos Islands	6.51	6.14	6.17				6.51	
17	Nicolas Arriola	Guatemala	x	6.51	x				6.51	

=== Triple jump ===
July 6

Rank	Name	Nationality	#1	#2	#3	#4	#5	#6	Result	Notes
1st place, gold medalist(s)	Isaiah Griffith	United States	x	16.79w	16.78w	16.66	x	16.47	16.79w	
2nd place, silver medalist(s)	Armani Wallace	United States	16.31w	16.43	16.72w	16.61w	16.56	x	16.72w	
3rd place, bronze medalist(s)	O'Brien Wasome	Jamaica	15.83w	x	x	x	15.90	16.66w	16.66w	
4	Holland Martin	Bahamas	16.36w	16.47w	x	–	16.14	–	16.47w	
5	Tamar Greene	Bahamas	16.20	16.45w	x	–	16.13w	–	16.45w	
6	Fredy Lemus	Guatemala	15.80	15.48w	15.95w	15.96w	x	x	15.96w	
7	Rubén Chan Tan	Mexico	14.20w	14.49w	14.84w	x	15.11w	15.04w	15.11w	
8	Enrique Garibaldi	Mexico	x	x	13.91w	13.82	14.56	x	14.56w	

=== Shot put ===
July 6

Rank	Name	Nationality	#1	#2	#3	#4	#5	#6	Result	Notes
1st place, gold medalist(s)	Jordan Geist	United States	19.97	20.21	x	19.90	19.85	20.81	20.81	CR
2nd place, silver medalist(s)	Kyle Mitchell	Jamaica	15.63	17.78	x	17.91	18.70	18.66	18.70	
3rd place, bronze medalist(s)	Zackery Short	Honduras	17.32	18.34	18.09	17.76	x	x	18.34	
4	Mark Bujnowski	Canada	15.72	x	x	17.34	18.10	18.30	18.30	
5	Jairo Morán	Mexico	17.31	x	17.32	17.19	17.75	x	17.75	
6	Israel Martínez	Mexico	14.01	x	x	x	13.22	x	14.01	

=== Discus throw ===
July 5

Rank	Name	Nationality	Result	Notes
1st place, gold medalist(s)	Roje Stona	Jamaica	56.97	
2nd place, silver medalist(s)	Iffy Joyner	United States	54.92	
3rd place, bronze medalist(s)	Mark Bujnowski	Canada	50.77	
4	Kai Chang	Jamaica	49.07	
5	Israel Martínez	Mexico	43.84	
6	Juan Amparan	Mexico	42.17	
	Jerimiah Evans	United States	NM	

=== Hammer throw ===
July 6

Rank	Name	Nationality	#1	#2	#3	#4	#5	#6	Result	Notes
1st place, gold medalist(s)	Robert Colantonio	United States	x	x	64.69	x	62.97	66.78	66.78	
2nd place, silver medalist(s)	Kieran McKeag	United States	x	64.58	65.21	66.37	x	66.21	66.37	
3rd place, bronze medalist(s)	Andreas Troschke	Canada	55.70	x	59.57	x	57.18	60.61	60.61	
4	Jonathan Absalon	Mexico	56.00	60.28	x	58.04	58.95	x	60.28	
5	Samuel Coulson-Willett	Canada	x	x	60.05	x	60.13	x	60.13	
6	Alan Marrujo	Mexico	54.60	55.72	57.27	x	56.04	54.78	57.27	

=== Javelin throw ===
July 7

Rank	Name	Nationality	#1	#2	#3	#4	#5	#6	Result	Notes
1st place, gold medalist(s)	Anderson Peters	Grenada	x	78.66	78.50	80.63	81.89	x	81.89	CR
2nd place, silver medalist(s)	Marki Felix	Grenada	70.50	78.10	70.21	75.73	73.11	71.38	78.10	
3rd place, bronze medalist(s)	Félix Torres	Puerto Rico	61.20	x	64.98	x	67.13	68.72	68.72	
4	Cade Antonucci	United States	64.08	65.95	64.36	63.10	65.11	68.37	68.37	
5	Ángel Daniel Aleman	Mexico	65.99	64.32	x	63.66	x	67.23	67.23	
6	Jaime Arroyo	Mexico	62.04	60.36	60.01	61.95	60.75	65.15	65.15	
7	Roan Allen	Canada	58.09	57.96	63.18	58.65	59.41	64.75	64.75	
8	Keyon Burton	Dominica	58.64	61.98	x	57.20	x	55.29	61.98	
9	Jesse Newman	United States	60.88	59.75	61.37				61.37	
10	Avery Joseph	United States Virgin Islands	55.84	60.11	x				60.11	
11	Ahmed Joseph	United States Virgin Islands	x	58.51	x				58.51	

== Women's results ==
=== 100 meters ===
Heats – July 5
Wind:
Heat 1: +1.4 m/s, Heat 2: +1.5 m/s

Rank	Heat	Name	Nationality	Time	Notes
1	2	Teahna Daniels	United States	11.24	Q
2	2	Halle Hazzard	Grenada	11.29	Q
3	1	Twanisha Terry	United States	11.38	Q
4	2	Audrey Leduc	Canada	11.54	Q
5	1	Tristan Evelyn	Barbados	11.57	Q
6	2	Bliss Jade Soleyn	Antigua and Barbuda	11.73	q
7	1	Kemba Nelson	Jamaica	11.74	Q
8	1	Shyvonne Roxborough	Canada	11.74	q
9	1	Nia Jack	United States Virgin Islands	11.80	
10	1	Hilary Gladden	Belize	11.83	
11	2	Shalysa Wray	Cayman Islands	11.93	
12	2	Monica Ortiz	Mexico	12.36	
13	1	Aurora Jurado	Mexico	12.40	

Final – July 5
Wind:
+3.3 m/s

Rank	Lane	Name	Nationality	Time	Notes
1st place, gold medalist(s)	6	Teahna Daniels	United States	11.03	
2nd place, silver medalist(s)	5	Twanisha Terry	United States	11.08	
3rd place, bronze medalist(s)	3	Halle Hazzard	Grenada	11.20	
4	4	Tristan Evelyn	Barbados	11.40	
5	7	Audrey Leduc	Canada	11.52	
6	2	Shyvonne Roxborough	Canada	11.61	
7	1	Bliss Jade Soleyn	Antigua and Barbuda	11.78	
8	8	Kemba Nelson	Jamaica	13.75	

=== 200 meters ===
July 7
Wind: +1.6 m/s

Rank	Name	Nationality	Time	Notes
1st place, gold medalist(s)	Anglerne Annelus	United States	22.84	
2nd place, silver medalist(s)	Natassha McDonald	Canada	23.31	
3rd place, bronze medalist(s)	Ashlan Best	Canada	23.75	
4	Shalysa Wray	Cayman Islands	24.39	
5	Hilary Gladden	Belize	24.47	
6	Andrea Guajardo	Mexico	25.00	
7	Monica Ortiz	Mexico	25.49	
8	Adriana Andrade	El Salvador	26.27	

=== 400 meters ===
Heats – July 5

Rank	Heat	Name	Nationality	Time	Notes
1	1	Chloe Abbott	United States	51.66	Q
2	2	Roneisha McGregor	Jamaica	52.15	Q
3	1	Kyra Constantine	Canada	52.22	Q
4	2	Syaira Richardson	United States	53.30	Q
5	2	Milagros Durán	Dominican Republic	53.36	Q
6	1	Tiffany James	Jamaica	55.22	Q
7	2	Lizeth Parga	Mexico	55.67	q
8	1	Valeria González	Mexico	55.92	q
9	1	Lissette Ramírez	Costa Rica	58.88	

Final – July 6

Rank	Lane	Name	Nationality	Time	Notes
1st place, gold medalist(s)	3	Kyra Constantine	Canada	51.51	
2nd place, silver medalist(s)	5	Roneisha McGregor	Jamaica	51.70	
3rd place, bronze medalist(s)	4	Chloe Abbott	United States	51.87	
4	6	Syaira Richardson	United States	53.04	
5	7	Milagros Durán	Dominican Republic	54.04	
6	2	Lizeth Parga	Mexico	55.53	
7	1	Valeria González	Mexico	56.27	
	8	Tiffany James	Jamaica	DNS	

=== 800 meters ===
July 6

Rank	Name	Nationality	Time	Notes
1st place, gold medalist(s)	Avi'Tal Wilson-Perteete	United States	2:05.70	
2nd place, silver medalist(s)	Nia Akins	United States	2:07.11	
3rd place, bronze medalist(s)	Erinn Stenman-Fahey	Canada	2:11.58	
4	Alma Delia Cortes	Mexico	2:12.77	
5	Veronica Ángel	Mexico	2:13.44	
6	Lissette Ramírez	Costa Rica	2:19.79	
7	Kennedy Thomson	Canada	2:21.93	

=== 1500 meters ===
July 7

Rank	Name	Nationality	Time	Notes
1st place, gold medalist(s)	Alma Delia Cortes	Mexico	4:28.37	
2nd place, silver medalist(s)	Katie Rainsberger	United States	4:30.86	
3rd place, bronze medalist(s)	Alexis Fuller	United States	4:36.60	
4	Silvia de la Peña	Mexico	4:55.59	

=== 5000 meters ===
July 5

Rank	Name	Nationality	Time	Notes
1st place, gold medalist(s)	Jaci Smith	United States	16:51.41	
2nd place, silver medalist(s)	Jessica Drop	United States	17:33.81	
3rd place, bronze medalist(s)	Elizabeth Tuxpan	Mexico	18:34.16	
4	Paola Ramos	Puerto Rico	19:00.93	
5	María Fernanda Hernández	Mexico	19:16.02	

=== 10,000 meters ===
July 7

Rank	Name	Nationality	Time	Notes
1st place, gold medalist(s)	Kathryn Munks	United States	37:03.63	
2nd place, silver medalist(s)	Elizabeth Funderburk	United States	38:06.83	
3rd place, bronze medalist(s)	Paola Ramos	Puerto Rico	38:55.70	
4	Jana Sánchez	Mexico	38:58.42	
5	Sandra Hernández	Mexico	41:12.28	

=== 100 meters hurdles ===
Heats – July 6
Wind:
Heat 1: +1.6 m/s, Heat 2: +0.7 m/s

Rank	Heat	Name	Nationality	Time	Notes
1	1	Chanel Brissett	United States	12.86	Q
2	2	Tonea Marshall	United States	12.95	Q
3	1	Mariam Abdul-Rashid	Canada	13.44	Q
4	2	Kendra Leger	Canada	13.61	Q
5	1	Ayanna Morgan	Barbados	13.71	Q
6	2	Greisys Roble	Cuba	13.71	Q
7	1	Deya Erickson	British Virgin Islands	13.80	q
8	1	María Fernanda Patrón	Mexico	13.84	q
9	2	Maritza Carreón	Mexico	14.17	
10	1	Nancy Sandoval	El Salvador	14.20	
11	2	Adriana Andrade	El Salvador	15.23	

Final – July 6
Wind:
+1.7 m/s

Rank	Lane	Name	Nationality	Time	Notes
1st place, gold medalist(s)	5	Tonea Marshall	United States	12.57	CR
2nd place, silver medalist(s)	4	Chanel Brissett	United States	12.73	
3rd place, bronze medalist(s)	3	Mariam Abdul-Rashid	Canada	13.23	
4	6	Kendra Leger	Canada	13.55	
5	8	Greisys Roble	Cuba	13.57	
6	7	Ayanna Morgan	Barbados	13.71	
7	1	María Fernanda Patrón	Mexico	13.78	
8	2	Deya Erickson	British Virgin Islands	13.89	

=== 400 meters hurdles ===
July 5

Rank	Name	Nationality	Time	Notes
1st place, gold medalist(s)	Anna Cockrell	United States	56.54	
2nd place, silver medalist(s)	Shiann Salmon	Jamaica	56.83	
3rd place, bronze medalist(s)	Brittley Humphrey	United States	57.36	
4	Gabriella Scott	Puerto Rico	57.53	
5	Dreshanae Rolle	Bahamas	1:00.72	
6	Yara Amador	Mexico	1:01.60	
7	Tarika Moses	British Virgin Islands	1:01.84	
8	Leslie López	Mexico	1:03.65	

=== 3000 meters steeplechase ===
July 6

Rank	Name	Nationality	Time	Notes
1st place, gold medalist(s)	Hannah Steelman	United States	10:21.88	
2nd place, silver medalist(s)	Gabrielle Jennings	United States	10:47.35	
3rd place, bronze medalist(s)	Nayelly Mendoza	Mexico	11:18.66	
4	Arian Iveth Chia	Mexico	11:48.30	

=== 4 × 100 meters relay ===
July 6

Rank	Lane	Nation	Competitors	Time	Notes
1st place, gold medalist(s)	6	United States	Brianna Duncan, Rebekah Smith, Anglerne Annelus, Twanisha Terry	42.97	
2nd place, silver medalist(s)	4	Canada	Shyvonne Roxborough, Ashlan Best, Natassha McDonald, Audrey Leduc	44.28	
3rd place, bronze medalist(s)	3	Mexico	Aurora Jurado, Monica Ortiz, Araceli Espinosa, Alejandra Ortiz	47.52	
4	5	Bahamas	Daejha Moss, Dreshanae Rolle, Celine Thompson, Charisma Taylor	47.82	

=== 5000 meters walk ===
July 5

Rank	Name	Nationality	Time	Notes
1st place, gold medalist(s)	Valeria Ortuño	Mexico	23:05.08	
2nd place, silver medalist(s)	Amberly Melendez	United States	23:25.50	
3rd place, bronze medalist(s)	Diana Miranda	Mexico	23:40.73	
4	Anali Cisneros	United States	24:15.11	

=== High jump ===
July 6

Rank	Name	Nationality	Result	Notes
1st place, gold medalist(s)	Nicole Greene	United States	1.87	
2nd place, silver medalist(s)	Ximena Esquivel	Mexico	1.87	
3rd place, bronze medalist(s)	Erinn Beattie	United States	1.75	
4	Daejha Moss	Bahamas	1.75	
5	Celine Thompson	Bahamas	1.65	
5	Yashira Rhymer-Stuart	United States Virgin Islands	1.65	

=== Pole vault ===
July 6

Rank	Name	Nationality	3.05	3.50	3.60	3.70	3.80	3.90	4.00	4.10	4.20	4.30	4.41	Result	Notes
1st place, gold medalist(s)	Alina McDonald	United States	–	–	–	–	–	o		o	o	o	xxx	4.30	
2nd place, silver medalist(s)	Sophia Franklin	United States	–	–	–	–	–							3.90	
3rd place, bronze medalist(s)	Silvia Guerrero	Mexico			xxo	xo	o							3.80	
4	Andrea Velasco	El Salvador		o			xxx							3.70	
5	Valeria Pagan	Puerto Rico		o	xxo	xxx								3.60	
	María José Muñoz	Mexico	xxx											NM	

=== Long jump ===
July 5

Rank	Name	Nationality	#1	#2	#3	#4	#5	#6	Result	Notes
1st place, gold medalist(s)	Aliyah Whisby	United States	6.82w	x	6.43w	6.33	–	6.25	6.82w	
2nd place, silver medalist(s)	Jasmyn Steels	United States	6.60	6.64w	6.59	6.38w	x	6.61w	6.64w	
3rd place, bronze medalist(s)	Jessicca Noble	Jamaica	6.47	6.49	–	–	5.97	6.49w	6.49	
4	Taishia Pryce	Jamaica	6.42	6.45	x	6.30	x	6.49w	6.49w	
5	Sandra Latrace	Canada	5.84w	6.24	6.11w	6.04	x	6.11	6.24	
6	Flor Romero	Mexico	x	x	x	5.67	5.52	5.32	5.67	
7	Karla Almodóvar	Mexico	x	5.48	5.49w	5.30w	5.19w	5.29w	5.49w	

=== Triple jump ===
July 5

Rank	Name	Nationality	#1	#2	#3	#4	#5	#6	Result	Notes
1st place, gold medalist(s)	Davisleydis Velazco	Cuba	x	13.94w	x	x	x	13.57	13.94w	
2nd place, silver medalist(s)	Danielle Spence	Jamaica	13.24	x	13.14w	x	12.71	11.82	13.24	
3rd place, bronze medalist(s)	Charisma Taylor	Bahamas	13.10	12.99w	13.20	13.22w	x	12.87	13.22w	
4	Chaquinn Cook	United States	x	12.67	13.00w	12.65	13.11	13.16	13.16	
5	Bria Matthews	United States	13.00	12.79	12.93	13.01	13.15	12.87	13.15	
6	Aria Small	Barbados	12.39w	12.23	x	x	12.19	12.85	12.85	
7	Flor Romero	Mexico	x	12.12	x	12.17	x	x	12.17	
8	María Fernanda Rea	Mexico	x	x	12.06	11.86	x	x	12.06	

=== Shot put ===
July 6

Rank	Name	Nationality	#1	#2	#3	#4	#5	#6	Result	Notes
1st place, gold medalist(s)	Samantha Noennig	United States	15.70	17.23	15.67	16.87	16.14	17.16	17.23	
2nd place, silver medalist(s)	Alyssa Wilson	United States	16.40	16.73	x	x	16.35	x	16.73	
3rd place, bronze medalist(s)	Gabrielle Bailey	Jamaica	15.09	x	x	14.74	16.51	x	16.51	
4	Grace Tennant	Canada	14.01	14.87	x	15.15	x	14.74	15.15	
5	Liliana Mojica	Mexico	14.27	14.87	14.86	15.08	15.06	14.78	15.08	

=== Discus throw ===
July 5

Rank	Name	Nationality	#1	#2	#3	#4	#5	#6	Result	Notes
1st place, gold medalist(s)	Shanice Love	Jamaica	60.14	x	x	53.76	58.49	58.95	60.14	CR
2nd place, silver medalist(s)	Laulauga Tausaga	United States	56.21	55.70	53.73	53.59	51.76	59.37	59.37	
3rd place, bronze medalist(s)	Melany Matheus	Cuba	54.83	52.75	55.40	x	x	x	55.40	
4	Gabrielle Bailey	Jamaica	x	51.89	50.21	54.99	51.62	5.09(?)	54.99	
5	Abigale Wilson	United States	x	54.75	x	50.36	x	x	54.75	
6	Alma Pollorena	Mexico	48.48	50.42	50.05	47.59	x	49.29	50.42	
7	Grace Tennant	Canada	46.80	48.07	x	49.07	47.18	49.65	49.65	
8	Veronica Luzania	Mexico	x	42.36	43.56	43.52	x	42.82	43.56	
9	Lacee Barnes	Cayman Islands	x	x	40.27				40.27	

=== Hammer throw ===
July 5

Rank	Name	Nationality	Result	Notes
1st place, gold medalist(s)	Alyssa Wilson	United States	63.95	
2nd place, silver medalist(s)	Liz Arleen Collía	Cuba	60.94	
3rd place, bronze medalist(s)	Tasha Willing	Canada	59.50	
4	Loreto Jacobo	Mexico	56.00	
5	Miranda Vazquez	Mexico	53.70	
6	Naquita Williams	Canada	52.31	
7	Sonja Moreno	Guatemala	50.60	

=== Javelin throw ===
July 6

Rank	Name	Nationality	Result	Notes
1st place, gold medalist(s)	Kylee Carter	United States	54.48	
2nd place, silver medalist(s)	Jenna Gray	United States	53.87	
3rd place, bronze medalist(s)	Luz Mariana Castro	Mexico	53.56	
4	Karla Gallardo	Mexico	39.96	
5	Shanee Angol	Dominica	36.46	

== Mixed results ==
=== 4 × 400 meters relay ===
July 7

Rank	Nation	Competitors	Time	Notes
1st place, gold medalist(s)	Jamaica	Terry Thomas (M), Shiann Salmon (W), Martin Manley (M), Roneisha McGregor (W)	3:16.99	
2nd place, silver medalist(s)	United States	Norman Grimes (M), Chloe Abbott (W), Hannah Waller (W), Marcus Parker (M)	3:17.74	
3rd place, bronze medalist(s)	Canada	Natassha McDonald (W), Khamal Stewart-Baynes (M), Kyra Constantine (W), Austin Cole (M)	3:22.43	
4	Mexico	Dana Castro (W), Brandon Constantino (M), Lizeth Parga (W), Jesús Pablo Mares (M)	3:32.40	
