= Quincy Hall =

American athlete (born 1998)

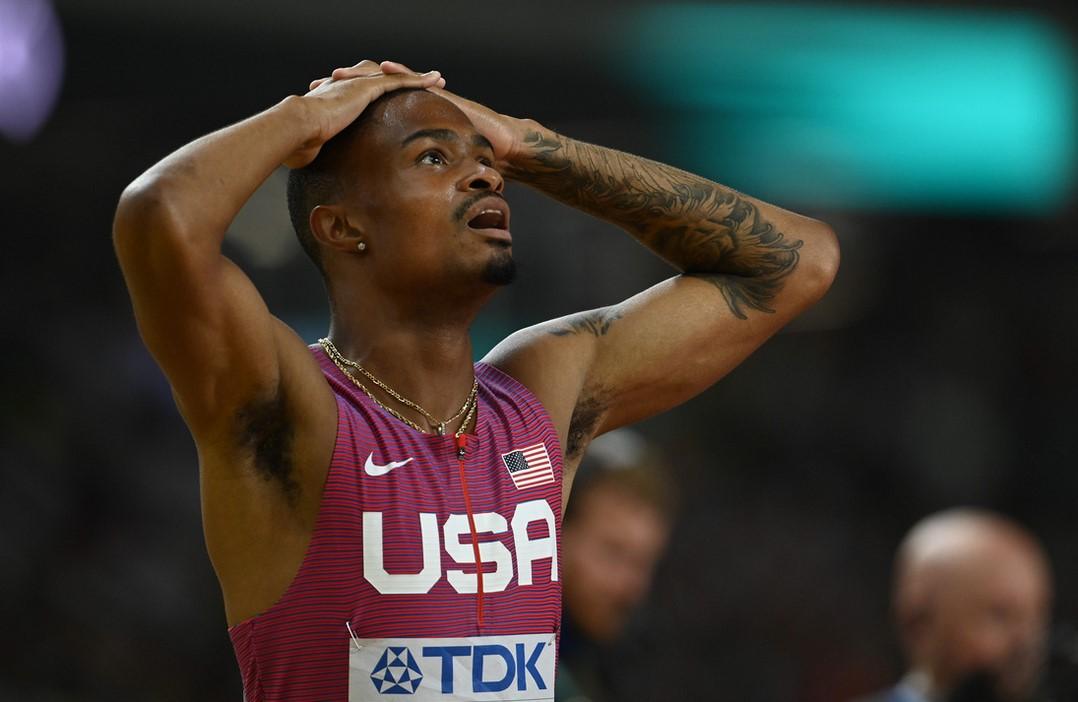
- Hall at the 2023 World Championships in Budapest

Personal information
- Born: July 31, 1998 (age 28) Kansas City, Missouri, U.S.
- Education: University of South Carolina
- Height: 6 ft 2 in (187 cm)

Sport
- Sport: Athletics
- Events: 400 m, 400 m hurdles
- Club: Nike; Adidas

Achievements and titles
- Personal bests: 400 m: 43.40 (Paris, 2024); 400 m hurdles: 48.10 (Eugene, 2022)
Medal record
Men's athletics
Representing the United States
Olympic Games
Gold medal – first place	2024 Paris	400 m
World Championships
Gold medal – first place	2023 Budapest	4 × 400 m relay
Bronze medal – third place	2023 Budapest	400 m
NACAC Championships
Gold medal – first place	2022 Freeport	4 × 400 m relay
Gold medal – first place	2022 Freeport	4 × 400 mixed relay
NACAC U23 Championships
Gold medal – first place	2019 Querétaro	400 m hurdles
Pan American U20 Athletics Championships
Gold medal – first place	2017 Trujilo	400 m hurdles

Quincy Hall (born July 31, 1998) is an American track and field athlete who competes in the 400 metres and 400 m hurdles. He won the gold medal at the 2024 Summer Olympics in the 400 metres event.

== Early life ==
From Kansas City, Missouri, Hall participated in track, football and wrestling at Raytown South High School. He is the son of Milton and Iecia Hall, has a brother, Milton, and a sister, Breanna, both of whom also ran track. Hall is a 2016 state champion in the 400 meters where he set a Missouri State High School Activities Association MSHSAA state record in 46.82 s.

Hall also attended the College of the Sequoias in California. In 2017, he was the California Community College Athletic Association champion in the 4 × 400 m relay, 400 m and 400 m hurdles leading the team to a state title at 2017 CCCAA State Track and Field Championships.

Quincy Hall earned 7 California Community College Athletic Association National Junior College Athletic Association All-America honors.

== Career ==
In 2017, competing at the 2017 Pan American U20 Athletics Championships, held in Peru, Hall won the 400 m hurdles in a new personal best time, and a new championship record time, 49.02 seconds. He set a new meet record at the 2017 Stanford Invitational race over 400 m, of 45.32. In 2018, he won at the Stanford Invitational again, this time over 400 m hurdles.

A student at the University of South Carolina, Hall achieved success in 2019, winning the NCAA Outdoor Championship in the 400 m hurdles. That year, he also won the NACAC U23 Championship in the 400 m hurdles.

At the 2022 Prefontaine Classic in Eugene, Hall lowered his 400 m hurdles personal best time to 48.10s. At the 2022 NACAC Championships, he won gold in the inaugural mixed 4 × 400 relay contested at the event. He was also a member of the triumphant men's 4 × 400 m relay team at the event.

Competing at the 2023 USA Outdoor Track and Field Championships, in Eugene, Oregon, Hall reached the final of the 400 m competition with the fourth fastest time. In the final, he ran a new personal best time of 44.41s to finish third.

Competing at the 2023 World Athletics Championships in Budapest, Hall ran a personal best time of 44.37 to win a bronze medal in the 400 metres final.

Hall won the 400 metres at the 2024 BAUHAUS-galan in Stockholm on June 2, 2024. On July 12, 2024, he ran a world-leading and personal best time of 43.80 at the 2024 Herculis Diamond League event in Monaco.

At the 2024 Summer Olympics in Paris, Hall came from behind to win gold in the 400 m, in 43.40 seconds. His sprint is the fifth-fastest all-time, making him the fourth-fastest person in the 400m event in history, across all competitions.

In October 2024, it was announced that he had signed up for the inaugural season of the Michael Johnson founded Grand Slam Track. He dropped out from Grand Slam Track in April 2025 and was replaced by Steven Gardiner. He opened his season instead at the 2025 Shanghai Diamond League event in China on 3 May 2025, placing eighth. Later that month, he ran 44.90 seconds to finish third behind Jacory Patterson in the 400 metres at the 2025 Meeting International Mohammed VI d'Athlétisme de Rabat, also part of the 2025 Diamond League. He was the winner of the 400 metres at the Diamond League event at the 2025 Golden Gala in Rome on 6 June 2025.

With a hamstring injury ruling him out of the rest of 2025, Hall raced intermittently in 2026 and did not reach the final of the 400 m at the 2026 USA Championships in New York in July.

== International competitions ==
Representing the United States
Year	Competition	Venue	Position	Event	Time	Wind (m/s)	Notes
2023	2023 World Championships	National Athletics Centre	3rd	400 m	44.37		
2023	2023 World Championships	National Athletics Centre	1st	4 × 400 m relay	2:57.31 WL		
2024	2024 Summer Olympics	Stade de France	1st	400 m	43.40		

=== Track records ===
As of 16 September 2024, Hall holds the following track records for 400 metres.

Location	Time	Date	Notes
Fayetteville, Ark.	44.60	11/05/2019	
Saint-Denis, Paris	43.40	07/08/2024	
Xiamen	44.38	02/09/2023	Track record shared with Kirani James of Grenada from the same race.

== Personal life ==
Hall is the son of Milton and Iecia Hall. He has a brother, Milton, and a sister, Breanna. He also has a half-brother, Jaylin Hall, a sister named Corinthia Hall, and a half-brother, Langston Hall. His daughter, A’Lani Hall, was born in October 2021.

== Awards ==
- Night of Legends Award 2024: Inspirational Olympic Performance Wing Award
