= 2015 World Youth Championships in Athletics – Mixed 4 × 400 metres relay =

Mixed 4 × 400 metres relay at the 2015 World Youth Championships in Athletics
- Venue: Estadio Olímpico Pascual Guerrero
- Dates: 18–19 July
- Competitors: 88 from 22 nations
- Winning time: 3:19.54

Medalists
gold medal	Keshun Reed; Lynna Irby; Norman Grimes; Samantha Watson; Symone Mason; Cory Poole	United States
silver medal	André Marich; Renate van Tonder; Taylon Bieldt; Kyle Appel; Armouré Conradie; Gianni Lombard	South Africa
bronze medal	Nathan Friginette; Ashlan Best; Dean Ellenwood; Kyra Constantine; Victoria Tachinski; Ebhani Blackwood	Canada

The mixed 4 × 400 metres relay at the 2015 World Youth Championships in Athletics was held at the Estadio Olímpico Pascual Guerrero in Cali, Colombia from 18 to 19 July 2015.

== Results ==
=== Round 1 ===
First 2 in each heat (Q) and the next 2 fastest (q) advance to the final.

Rank	Heat	Nation	Athletes	Time	Note
1	2	United States	Keshun Reed, Symone Mason, Cory Poole, Lynna Irby	3:22.65	Q
2	3	Japan	Ryota Kitahara, Rin Aoki, Mizuki Murakami, Manato Sasaki	3:24.76	Q
3	1	Poland	Natan Fiedeń, Natalia Kaczmarek, Katarzyna Martyna, Tymoteusz Zimny	3:25.19	Q
4	3	Canada	Victoria Tachinski, Dean Ellenwood, Ebhani Blackwood, Nathan Friginette	3:25.44	Q
5	1	Italy	Rebecca Borga, Linda Olivieri, Andrea Romani, Vladimir Aceti	3:25.62	Q
6	1	Germany	Florian Colon Marti, Marvin Schlegel, Jana Reinert, Corinna Schwab	3:25.71	q
7	3	South Africa	André Marich, Armouré Conradie, Taylon Bieldt, Gianni Lombard	3:26.90	q
8	3	Bahamas	Donovan Storr, Branson Rolle, Dreshanae Rolle, D'Nia Freeman	3:28.24	
9	3	Jamaica	Michael Bentley, Anthony Carpenter, Janiel Moore, Satanya Wright	3:28.71	
10	2	Romania	Nicolae Daroczi, Cristina Bălan, Andrea Miklós, Florin Gaspar	3:29.40	Q
11	2	Greece	Ánna Kiáfa, Yeóryios Kaloyerákis, Alexía Polikráti, Mihaíl Pappás	3:30.56	
12	3	Spain	Manuel Guijarro, Andrea Serrano, Ruth Peña, Álvaro Sierra	3:32.14	
13	1	Norway	Mathias Hove Johansen, Toralv Opsal, Kristine Berger, Mari Drabløs	3:32.95	
14	2	France	Sarah Richard, Sarah Koutouan, Thierry-Orden Dagbetin, Wilfried Happio	3:34.74	
15	3	Ecuador	Fanny Estupiñán, Sebastian Acuña, Tania Caicedo, Franco Loja	3:34.98	
–	2	Dominican Republic	Christopher Melenciano, Luis Charles, Maria Matos, Lilian Reyes	DQ	
–	1	Uzbekistan	Anjelika Belova, Elmira Gazizova, Shokhrukh Baratov, Zhalolitdin Khamrokulov	DQ	
–	1	Colombia	Rodrigo Lagares, Marisofía Pinilla, Jarly Marín, Anthony Zambrano	DQ	
–	1	China	Huang Jiaxin, Liang Nuo, Wu Yuang, Xu Haoran	DQ	
–	2	Bahrain	Esam Al-Hamrani, Fatuma Chebsi, Abdulrahman Ashreen, Salwa Eid Naser	DQ	
–	2	Mexico		DNS	
–	3	Saint Kitts and Nevis		DNS	

=== Final ===
Rank	Nation	Athletes	Time	Note
1st place, gold medalist(s)	United States	Keshun Reed, Lynna Irby, Norman Grimes, Samantha Watson	3:19.54	
2nd place, silver medalist(s)	South Africa	André Marich, Renate van Tonder, Taylon Bieldt, Kyle Appel	3:23.60	
3rd place, bronze medalist(s)	Canada	Nathan Friginette, Ashlan Best, Dean Ellenwood, Kyra Constantine	3:23.60	
4	Germany	Florian Colon Marti, Corinna Schwab, Lea Ahrens, Marvin Schlegel	3:24.50	
5	Poland	Natan Fiedeń, Natalia Kaczmarek, Katarzyna Martyna, Tymoteusz Zimny	3:24.64	
6	Japan	Ryota Kitahara, Rin Aoki, Mizuki Murakami, Manato Sasaki	3:25.01	
7	Italy	Ilaria Verderio, Linda Olivieri, Andrea Romani, Vladimir Aceti	3:25.29	
8	Romania	Nicolae Daroczi, Cristina Bălan, Andrea Miklós, Florin Gaspar	3:31.94	
