= Jordan Turner (long jumper) =

Jamaican long jumper (born 2002)

Personal information
- Full name: Jordan Yates Turner
- Nationality: Jamaican
- Born: 12 September 2002 (age 24)

Sport
- Sport: Athletics
- Event: Long jump

Achievements and titles
- Personal best: Long jump: 8.13 m (2023)
Medal record
Men's athletics
Representing Jamaica
Central American and Caribbean Games
Silver medal – second place	2023 San Salvador	Long jump
NACAC U23 Championships
Bronze medal – third place	2023 San Jose	Long jump
NACAC Championships (U18)
Silver medal – second place	2019 Queretaro	Long jump

Jordan Yates Turner (born 12 September 2002) is a Jamaican long jumper.

== Biography ==
From Kingston, Jamaica, Turner attended Calabar High School. He won the silver medal in the long jump at the 2019 NACAC U18 Championships in Mexico, with a jump of 7.46 metres in July 2019. He had a top-ten finish in the long jump at the 2021 World Athletics U20 Championships in Nairobi, Kenya.

In June 2023, Turner jumped a personal best 8.13 metres to place third behind fellow-Jamaicans Wayne Pinnock and Carey McLeod at the 2023 NCAA Division I Outdoor Track and Field Championships competing for the University of Kentucky. The jump was made on his NCAA Championships debut, and marked a new school record for Kentucky. Representing Jamaica the following month, he placed third behind Jeremiah Davis and Malcolm Clemons of the United States to win the bronze medal in the long jump at the NACAC U23 Championships in San Jose, Costa Rica in July 2023, with a jump of 7.82 metres. He won the long jump silver medal representing Jamaica at the 2023 Central American and Caribbean Games in San Salvador June 2023.

Turner transferred to Louisiana State University. Competing for LSU, he placed seventh in tbf final of the 2026 NCAA Indoor Championships with a jump of 7.97 metres. Turner qualified for the men's long jump at the 2026 NCAA Outdoor Championships with a jump of 7.91 metres, prior to placing ninth overall in the final. That month, he finished runner-up to Tajay Gayle at the Jamaican Athletics Championships. Turner was selected to represent Jamaica at the 2026 Commonwealth Games in Glasgow, Scotland, qualifying for the final of the long jump competition, placing ninth overall with a jump of 7.65 metres in the final.
