= Shawn-D Thompson =

Jamaican long jumper (born 1997)

Personal information
- Nationality: Jamaican
- Born: 20 January 1997 (age 29)
- Home town: Portmore, Jamaica

Sport
- Sport: Athletics
- Event: Long jump
- Coached by: Marlon Gayle

Achievements and titles
- Personal bests: Long jump: 8.22 m (Joensuu, 2024); Triple jump: 16.61 m (Kingston, 2025)
Medal record
Men's athletics
Representing Jamaica
NACAC Championships
Bronze medal – third place	2022 Freeport	Long jump
Bronze medal – third place	2025 Freeport	Long jump
NACAC U23 Championships
Silver medal – second place	2019 Querétaro	Long jump
CARIFTA Games U20
Bronze medal – third place	2016 St. George's	Long jump

Shawn-D Thompson (born 20 January 1997) is a Jamaican long jumper.

== Early life ==
He attended GC Foster College in Spanish Town.

== Career ==
He is coached by Marlon Gayle and has based his run-up style on Ivan Pedroso of Cuba. He was a silver medalist at the 2019 NACAC U23 Championships in Queretaro, Mexico, with a jump of 8.05 metres.

He finished fourth in the long jump at the 2022 Commonwealth Games in Birmingham, England, jumping 8.05 metres but missing out on bronze by a centimetre. He won a bronze medal at the 2022 NACAC Championships in Freeport, Bahamas with a jump of 7.75 metres.

In June 2024, he competed at the Jamaican Athletics Championships long jump and was initially credited with a second-place finish and a new personal best although the jump was later ruled to have been a foul.

He was runner-up to Carey McLeod in the men's long jump at the 2025 Jamaican Athletics Championships on 28 June with a jump of 7.84m. He was named in the Jamaican squad for the 2025 NACAC Championships in The Bahamas, winning the bronze medal. He was named as an alternative for the Jamaican team for the 2025 World Athletics Championships in Tokyo, Japan.
