= 2015 World Youth Championships in Athletics – Boys' 110 metres hurdles =

Boys' 110 metres hurdles at the 2015 World Youth Championships in Athletics
- Venue: Estadio Olímpico Pascual Guerrero
- Dates: 16–17 July
- Competitors: 37 from 31 nations
- Winning time: 13.53

Medalists
gold medal	Mattéo Ngo	France
silver medal	Joseph Daniels	Canada
bronze medal	Isaiah Lucas	United States

The boys' 110 metres hurdles at the 2015 World Youth Championships in Athletics was held at the Estadio Olímpico Pascual Guerrero in Cali, Colombia from 16 to 17 July 2015.

== Records ==
Prior to the competition, the following records were as follows.

World Youth Best	Jaheel Hyde (JAM)	12.96	Nanjing, China	23 August 2014
Championship Record	Jaheel Hyde (JAM)	13.13	Donetsk, Ukraine	12 July 2013
World Youth Leading	Gianni Lombard (RSA)	13.44	Stellenbosch, South Africa	14 March 2015
World Youth Leading	Mpho Tladi (RSA)	13.44	Rustenburg, South Africa	27 March 2015

== Results ==
=== Round 1 ===
First 4 in each heat (Q) and the next 4 fastest (q) advance to the semifinals.

Rank	Heat	Name	Nationality	Time	Note
1	5	Isaiah Lucas	United States	13.44	Q, WYL
2	1	Mpho Tladi	South Africa	13.53	Q
3	3	Sales Inglin	Switzerland	13.59	Q
4	2	Joseph Daniels	Canada	13.62	Q, PB
4	4	Norman Grimes	United States	13.62	Q, PB
6	3	Mattéo Ngo	France	13.64	Q, PB
7	5	Jonathan Petzke	Germany	13.66	Q, PB
7	5	Juan Germain	Chile	13.66	Q, PB
9	3	Yoan Villa	Cuba	13.68	Q, PB
10	1	Brandon Herrigan	Australia	13.69	Q, PB
11	5	Luis Salort	Spain	13.70	Q, PB
12	4	Heitor Coelho	Brazil	13.71	Q
13	2	Levert Pieterse	South Africa	13.72	Q
14	1	Max Hrelja	Sweden	13.75	Q
15	5	Mason Weh	Liberia	13.79	q, PB
16	2	Tavonte Mott	Bahamas	13.81	Q
17	4	Jean-Alexandre Anaclet	France	13.85	Q, PB
18	2	Marco Bigoni	Italy	13.87	Q, PB
19	5	Loris Manojlovic	Italy	13.88	q, PB
20	4	Jan Sans	Spain	13.94	Q, PB
21	1	Alex Robinson	Jamaica	13.95	Q
22	3	Fares Al-Said	Kuwait	13.96	Q
23	4	Bo Xiaoshuai	China	14.00	q
24	4	Mikdat Sevler	Turkey	14.01	q, PB
25	1	Bálint Szeles	Hungary	14.09	PB
26	5	Matúš Meluš	Slovakia	14.11	
27	3	Simon Traore	Denmark	14.12	PB
28	2	Chadrick Brown	Jamaica	14.19	
29	3	Wienstan Mena	Guatemala	14.25	
30	4	Diego Vivas	Colombia	14.27	PB
31	1	Manuel Riestra	Mexico	14.32	
32	2	Abduljaleel Al-Mannai	Qatar	14.35	
33	1	Sander Moldau	Estonia	14.41	
34	5	Niven Longopoa	Tonga	14.48	PB
35	2	Khaled Savadogo	Burkina Faso	15.23	PB
36	2	Juma Al-Habsi	Oman	15.25	PB
–	3	Santhosh Kumar Tamilarasan	India	DQ	

=== Semifinal ===
First 2 in each heat (Q) and the next 2 fastest (q) advance to the final.

Rank	Heat	Name	Nationality	Time	Note
1	1	Heitor Coelho	Brazil	13.49	Q, PB
1	1	Joseph Daniels	Canada	13.49	Q, PB
3	2	Isaiah Lucas	United States	13.50	Q
3	2	Max Hrelja	Sweden	13.50	Q, PB
5	2	Mattéo Ngo	France	13.53	q, PB
6	2	Yoan Villa	Cuba	13.57	q, PB
7	3	Juan Germain	Chile	13.58	Q, PB
8	1	Mason Weh	Liberia	13.60	PB
9	3	Brandon Herrigan	Australia	13.61	Q, PB
9	1	Jean-Alexandre Anaclet	France	13.61	PB
11	3	Mpho Tladi	South Africa	13.63	
12	2	Jonathan Petzke	Germany	13.64	PB
13	1	Sales Inglin	Switzerland	13.67	
14	3	Tavonte Mott	Bahamas	13.68	
15	3	Norman Grimes	United States	13.75	
16	3	Fares Al-Said	Kuwait	13.82	PB
17	1	Luis Salort	Spain	13.89	
18	3	Bo Xiaoshuai	China	13.94	
19	2	Mikdat Sevler	Turkey	13.98	PB
20	3	Marco Bigoni	Italy	14.02	
21	2	Jan Sans	Spain	14.13	
22	2	Alex Robinson	Jamaica	14.43	
23	1	Levert Pieterse	South Africa	14.66	
–	1	Loris Manojlovic	Italy	DQ	

=== Final ===
Rank	Name	Nationality	Time	Note
1st place, gold medalist(s)	Mattéo Ngo	France	13.53	PB
2nd place, silver medalist(s)	Joseph Daniels	Canada	13.54	
3rd place, bronze medalist(s)	Isaiah Lucas	United States	13.54	
4	Juan Germain	Chile	13.55	PB
5	Max Hrelja	Sweden	13.56	
6	Heitor Coelho	Brazil	13.57	
7	Yoan Villa	Cuba	13.69	
8	Brandon Herrigan	Australia	19.58	
