= José Oswaldo Calel =

Guatemalan racewalker

Personal information
- Full name: José Oswaldo Calel Sis
- Nationality: Ecuadorian
- Born: 8 August 1998 (age 27) Quejá, San Cristóbal Verapaz, Guatemala

Sport
- Sport: Men's athletics
- Event: Racewalking
Medal record
Men's athletics
Representing Guatemala
NACAC U23 Championships
| Silver medal – second place | 2019 Querétaro | 10,000 m walk |

José Oswaldo Calel Sis (Note: In this Spanish name, the first or paternal surname is Calel and the second or maternal family name is Sis.) (born 8 August 1998) is a Guatemalan racewalking athlete. He represented Guatemala at the 2020 Summer Olympics in the men's 20 kilometres walk.

== Career ==
Calel represented Guatemala at the 2019 NACAC U23 Championships in the 10,000 meters walk and won a silver medal.

He represented Guatemala at the 2020 Summer Olympics in the men's 20 kilometres walk and finished in 30th place.
