= 2019 NACAC U18 and U23 Championships in Athletics =

X NACAC U23 Championships in Athletics
- Dates: July 5–7
- Host city: Queretaro, Mexico
- Venue: Parque Queretaro 2000
- Level: U-23 & U-18
- Events: 44
- Participation: 28 nations
- Records set: CRs

The 10th NACAC U18 and U23 Championships in Athletics were held in Queretaro, Mexico from July 5–7, 2019. It was the first time that an U18 competition was added to the event alongside the U23 category.

The championship primarily revolved around track and field, and featured competitions across multiple events including sprint races, hurdles, steeplechase, relays, high jump, pole vault, shot put, javelin throws, and more.

== Medal summary ==
Across events, the top three nations were Mexico, Jamaica, and Canada.

- Mexico claimed 46 total medals, of which 15 gold
- Jamaica claimed 23 total medals, of which 13 gold
- Canada claimed 17 total medals, of which 5 gold

For medal more detailed information on medal winners and complete results, see footnotes

=== U23 men ===
Event	Gold		Silver		Bronze	
100 metres (wind: +1.1 m/s)	Waseem Williams (JAM)	10.01 (10.002) CR	Samson Colebrooke (BAH)	10.01 (10.004) CR	Mario Burke (BAR)	10.01 (10.010) CR
200 metres (wind: +0.8 m/s)	Samson Colebrooke (BAH)	20.58	Jereod Elcock (TTO)	20.65	Miciah Harris (USA)	20.74
400 metres	Trevor Stewart (USA)	45.01	Wilbert London (USA)	45.41	Austin Cole (CAN)	45.90
800 metres	Devin Dixon (USA)	1:47.69	Isaiah Jewett (USA)	1:49.43	Jauavney James (JAM)	1:49.52
1500 metres	Cade Bethmann (USA)	4:02.84	Víctor Ortiz (PUR)	4:03.39	Cristian García (MEX)	4:03.71
5000 metres	Erick Cayetano (MEX)	15:19.84	Jonathan del Razo (MEX)	15:22.39	Only two finishers	
10,000 metres	Matt Young (USA)	32:46.84	Jesús Nava (MEX)	32:48.75	Francisco Sánchez (MEX)	33:25.80
110 metres hurdles (wind: +2.7 m/s)	Phillip Lemonious (JAM)	13.47	Rohan Cole (JAM)	13.55	Dashuan Jackson (USA)	13.58
400 metres hurdles	Quincy Hall (USA)	49.77	Norman Grimes (USA)	50.07	Pablo Andrés Ibáñez (ESA)	50.96
3000 metres steeplechase	Alex Rogers (USA)	9:10.55	John Rice (USA)	9:16.29	Víctor Ortiz (PUR)	9:18.92
4 × 100 metres relay	United States; Justin Hall; Holland Martin; Darrell Singleton; Ja'Mari Ward	40.03	Bahamas; Tamar Greene; Samson Colebrooke; Holland Martin; Shakeem Hall-Smith	40.33	Only two finishing teams	
10,000 metres walk	Gustavo Israel Solís (MEX)	42:09.49	José Oswaldo Calel (GUA)	42:55.27	Saul Mena (MEX)	44:03.54
High jump	Keenon Laine (USA)	2.25 m (7 ft 4 1/2 in)	Earnest Sears (USA)	2.25 m (7 ft 4 1/2 in)	Erick Portillo (MEX)	2.22 m (7 ft 3 1/4 in)
Pole vault	Clayton Fritsch (USA)	5.60 m (18 ft 4 1/4 in) CR	Zach Bradford (USA)	5.60 m (18 ft 4 1/4 in) CR	Natán Rivera (ESA)	4.90 m (16 ft 3/4 in)
Long jump	Andwuelle Wright (TTO)	8.25 m (27 ft 3/4 in) +0.7 CR, NR	Shawn-D Thompson (JAM)	8.05 m (26 ft 4 3/4 in) +2.1	Wayne Pinnock (JAM)	7.97 m (26 ft 1 3/4 in) +1.0
Triple jump	Isaiah Griffith (USA)	16.79 m (55 ft 1 in) +3.0	Armani Wallace (USA)	16.72 m (54 ft 10 1/4 in) +3.3	O'Brien Wasome (JAM)	16.66 m (54 ft 7 3/4 in) +5.0
Shot put	Jordan Geist (USA)	20.81 m (68 ft 3 in) CR	Kyle Mitchell (JAM)	18.70 m (61 ft 4 in)	Zackery Short (HON)	18.34 m (60 ft 2 in)
Discus throw	Roje Stona (JAM)	56.97 m (186 ft 10 in)	Iffy Joyner (USA)	54.92 m (180 ft 2 in)	Mark Bujnowski (CAN)	50.77 m (166 ft 6 in)
Hammer throw	Robert Colantonio (USA)	66.78 m (219 ft 1 in)	Kieran McKeag (USA)	66.37 m (217 ft 8 in)	Andreas Troschke (CAN)	60.61 m (198 ft 10 in)
Javelin throw	Anderson Peters (GRN)	81.89 m (268 ft 8 in) CR	Markim Felix (GRN)	78.10 m (256 ft 2 in)	Félix Torres (PUR)	68.72 m (225 ft 5 in)

=== U23 women ===
Event	Gold		Silver		Bronze	
100 metres (wind: +3.3 m/s)	Teahna Daniels (USA)	11.03	Twanisha Terry (USA)	11.08	Halle Hazzard (GRN)	11.20
200 metres (wind: +1.6 m/s)	Anglerne Annelus (USA)	22.84	Natassha McDonald (CAN)	23.31	Ashlan Best (CAN)	23.75
400 metres	Kyra Constantine (CAN)	51.51	Roneisha McGregor (JAM)	51.70	Chloe Abbott (USA)	51.87
800 metres	Avi'Tal Wilson-Perteete (USA)	2:05.70	Nia Akins (USA)	2:07.11	Erinn Stenman-Fahey (CAN)	2:11.58
1500 metres	Alma Cortes (MEX)	4:28.37	Katie Rainsberger (USA)	4:30.86	Alexis Fuller (USA)	4:36.60
5000 metres	Jaci Smith (USA)	16:51.41	Jessica Drop (USA)	17:33.81	Elizabeth Tuxpan (MEX)	18:34.16
10,000 metres	Kathryn Munks (USA)	37:03.63	Elizabeth Funderburk (USA)	38:06.83	Paola Ramos (PUR)	38:55.70
100 metres hurdles (wind: +1.7 m/s)	Tonea Marshall (USA)	12.57 CR	Chanel Brissett (USA)	12.73	Mariam Abdul-Rashid (CAN)	13.23
400 metres hurdles	Anna Cockrell (USA)	56.54	Shiann Salmon (JAM)	56.83	Brittley Humphrey (USA)	57.36
3000 metres steeplechase	Hannah Steelman (USA)	10:21.88	Gabrielle Jennings (USA)	10:47.35	Nayelly Mendoza (MEX)	11:18.66
4 × 100 metres relay	United States; Brianna Duncan; Rebekah Smith; Anglerne Annelus; Twanisha Terry	42.97	Canada; Shyvonne Roxborough; Ashlan Best; Natassha McDonald; Audrey Leduc	44.28	Mexico; Aurora Jurado; Monica Ortiz; Araceli Espinosa; Alejandra Ortiz	47.52
5000 metres walk	Valeria Ortuño (MEX)	23:05.08	Amberly Melendez (USA)	23:25.50	Diana Miranda (MEX)	23:40.73
High jump	Nicole Greene (USA)	1.87 m (6 ft 1 1/2 in)	Ximena Esquivel (MEX)	1.87 m (6 ft 1 1/2 in)	Erinn Beattie (USA)	1.75 m (5 ft 8 3/4 in)
Pole vault	Alina McDonald (USA)	4.30 m (14 ft 1 1/4 in)	Sophia Franklin (USA)	3.90 m (12 ft 9 1/2 in)	Silvia Guerrero (MEX)	3.80 m (12 ft 5 1/2 in)
Long jump	Aliyah Whisby (USA)	6.82 m (22 ft 4 1/2 in) +2.8	Jasmyn Steels (USA)	6.64 m (21 ft 9 1/4 in) +2.3	Jessicca Noble (JAM)	6.49 m (21 ft 3 1/2 in) +1.3
Triple jump	Davisleydis Velazco (CUB)	13.94 m (45 ft 8 3/4 in) +3.5	Danielle Spence (JAM)	13.24 m (43 ft 5 1/4 in) +2.0	Charisma Taylor (BAH)	13.22 m (43 ft 4 1/4 in) +2.5
Shot put	Samantha Noennig (USA)	17.23 m (56 ft 6 in)	Alyssa Wilson (USA)	16.73 m (54 ft 10 in)	Gabrielle Bailey (JAM)	16.51 m (54 ft 2 in)
Discus throw	Shanice Love (JAM)	60.14 m (197 ft 3 in) CR	Laulauga Tausaga (USA)	59.37 m (194 ft 9 in)	Melany Matheus (CUB)	55.40 m (181 ft 9 in)
Hammer throw	Alyssa Wilson (USA)	63.95 m (209 ft 9 in)	Liz Arleen Collía (CUB)	60.94 m (199 ft 11 in)	Tasha Willing (CAN)	59.50 m (195 ft 2 in)
Javelin throw	Kylee Carter (USA)	54.48 m (178 ft 8 in)	Jenna Gray (USA)	53.87 m (176 ft 8 in)	Luz Mariana Castro (MEX)	53.56 m (175 ft 8 in)

=== U23 mixed ===
Event	Gold		Silver		Bronze	
4 × 400 metres relay	Jamaica; Terry Thomas; Shiann Salmon; Martin Manley; Roneisha McGregor	3:16.99 CR	United States; Norman Grimes; Chloe Abbott; Hannah Waller; Marcus Parker	3:17.74	Canada; Natassha McDonald; Khamal Stewart-Baynes; Kyra Constantine; Austin Cole	3:22.43

=== U18 boys ===
Event	Gold		Silver		Bronze	
100 metres (wind: +3.8 m/s)	Conroy Jones (JAM)	10.32	Darian Clarke (BAR)	10.38	Ackeem Blake (JAM)	10.41
200 metres (wind: +0.5 m/s)	Rajay Morris (JAM)	20.82	Darian Clarke (BAR)	21.18	Gerardo Lomeli (MEX)	21.19
400 metres	Luis Antonio Avilés (MEX)	46.36	Kyle Gale (BAR)	47.34	Deandre Watkin (JAM)	47.63
800 metres	Abdullahi Hassan (CAN)	1:52.48	Chevonne Hall (JAM)	1:53.32	Handal Roban (VIN)	1:53.39
1500 metres	Matthew Larkin (CAN)	4:12.63	Isrrael Tinajero (MEX)	4:12.90	Yael Paniagua (MEX)	4:14.96
3000 metres	Iker Sánchez (MEX)	8:42.71	Ian Sánchez (MEX)	8:46.19	Dakota Goguen (CAN)	9:12.76
110 metres hurdles (91.4 cm) (wind: +2.3 m/s)	Vashaun Vascianna (JAM)	13.09	Jerome Campbell (JAM)	13.59	Justin Guy (TTO)	13.79
400 metres hurdles (83.8 cm)	Sean Hewitt (JAM)	53.17	Devontie Archer (JAM)	53.18	Joshua Gorocica (MEX)	54.27
2000 metres steeplechase	Roberto Ángel Marquez (MEX)	6:14.67	Eduardo Cortez (MEX)	6:21.62	Brandon Barrantes (CRC)	6:21.70
4 × 100 metres relay	Jamaica; Jerome Campbell; Vashaun Vascianna; Raheim Scott; Conroy Jones	41.17	Trinidad and Tobago; Justin Guy; Devin Augustine; Jaydon Moore; Shakeem McKay	41.82	Mexico; Diego Flores; Victor Gabriel Galaviz; Jesús Eduardo Salinas; Diego Alberto Hernández	42.42
10,000 metres walk	César Cordova (MEX)	43:09.45	Cristhian Juarez (MEX)	44:43.75	Eduard Arias (CRC)	45:49.24
High jump	Romaine Beckford (JAM)	2.14 m (7 ft 1/4 in)	Aiden Grout (CAN)	2.08 m (6 ft 9 3/4 in)	Xesus Jaime (MEX)	1.96 m (6 ft 5 in)
Pole vault	Josué Daniel García (MEX)	4.65 m (15 ft 3 in)	Luis Mendoza (MEX)	4.20 m (13 ft 9 1/4 in)	Piero Braghieri (ESA)	4.00 m (13 ft 1 1/4 in)
Long jump	Kavian Kerr (JAM)	7.66 m (25 ft 1 1/2 in) +1.1	Jordan Turner (JAM)	7.46 m (24 ft 5 1/2 in) +2.3	Christopher Juárez (MEX)	6.88 m (22 ft 6 3/4 in) +3.0
Triple jump	Jordan Turner (JAM)	14.52 m (47 ft 7 1/2 in) +1.6	Nathan Crawford-Wallis (BAR)	14.45 m (47 ft 4 3/4 in) +2.2	Alfredo Maldonado (MEX)	13.86 m (45 ft 5 1/2 in) +0.9
Shot put (5 kg)	Ralford Mullings (JAM)	20.96 m (68 ft 9 in)	José Arturo Olmos (MEX)	18.07 m (59 ft 3 in)	Jairo Espinosa (MEX)	17.57 m (57 ft 7 in)
Discus throw (1.5 kg)	Ralford Mullings (JAM)	62.34 m (204 ft 6 in)	Tarajh Hudson (BAH)	56.74 m (186 ft 1 in)	Julio César Santos (MEX)	54.40 m (178 ft 5 in)
Hammer throw (5 kg)	Aldo Zavala (MEX)	69.89 m (229 ft 3 in)	Miguel Ángel Trevizo (MEX)	58.30 m (191 ft 3 in)	Alexis Sánchez (ESA)	45.37 m (148 ft 10 in)
Javelin throw (700 g)	Keyshawn Strachan (BAH)	62.70 m (205 ft 8 in)	Luis Ángel Ortega (MEX)	59.63 m (195 ft 7 in)	Alexis Rodríguez (MEX)	58.50 m (191 ft 11 in)

=== U18 girls ===
Event	Gold		Silver		Bronze	
100 metres (wind: +1.5 m/s)	Briana Williams (JAM) (U18)	11.11	Joella Lloyd (ATG) (U18)	11.43	Brandy Hall (JAM) (U18)	11.57
200 metres (wind: -0.6 m/s)	Shaniqua Bascombe (TTO)	24.00	Jillian Catton (CAN)	24.37	Caitlyn Bobb (BER)	24.53
400 metres	Caitlyn Bobb (BER)	53.92	Krystalann Bechard (CAN)	54.13	Rae-Anne Serville (TTO)	54.38
800 metres	Lorena Rangel (MEX)	2:10.28	Emma Pegg (CAN)	2:10.49	Cassandra Williamson (CAN)	2:11.15
1500 metres	Kendra Lewis (CAN)	4:44.89	Fabianna Szorenyi (PUR)	4:46.70	Jardine Lam-Colling (CAN)	4:47.25
3000 metres	Sabrina Salcedo (MEX)	10:16.70	Denisse Amaro (MEX)	10:38.43	Fabianna Szorenyi (PUR)	10:45.98
100 metres hurdles (wind: +0.8 m/s)	Crystal Morrison (JAM)	13.19	Ackera Nugent (JAM)	13.50	Isabella Goudros (CAN)	13.75
400 metres hurdles	María José Romero (MEX)	1:04.57	Silvia Duarte (MEX)	1:04.66	Daniela Aragón (ESA)	1:07.95
2000 metres steeplechase	Katelyn Stewart-Barnett (CAN)	7:15.31	Cecilia Howes (CAN)	7:34.40	Andrea Avalos (MEX)	7:40.30
4 × 100 metres relay	Jamaica; Krystal Sloley; Ackera Nugent; Brandy Hall; Crystal Morrison	45.02	Canada; Brianna Gayle; Isabella Goudros; Hannah Heise; Jillian Catton	46.09	Mexico; Evelyn Escobar; Monserrat Rodríguez; Dana Ponce; Barbara García	48.40
5000 metres walk	Sofia Ramos (MEX)	23:45.69	Mariana Muñoz (CRC)	24:18.64	María Camila Mena A (MEX)	26:03.07
High jump	Ana Paula Pollorena (MEX)	1.66 m (5 ft 5 1/4 in)	Claudia Millan (PUR)	1.63 m (5 ft 4 in)	Danna Rodríguez (MEX)	1.60 m (5 ft 2 3/4 in)
Pole vault	Adriana Arellano (MEX)	3.70 m (12 ft 1 1/2 in)	Escarlett García (MEX)	3.40 m (11 ft 1 3/4 in)	Only two competitors	
Long jump	Anthaya Charlton (BAH)	5.86 m (19 ft 2 1/2 in) +1.4	Paula-Ann Chambers (JAM)	5.76 m (18 ft 10 3/4 in) +2.0	María Fernanda Marquez (MEX)	5.69 m (18 ft 8 in) +2.4
Triple jump	Mahalia Mitchell (CAN)	13.13 m (43 ft 3/4 in) +1.4	María Fernanda Marquez (MEX)	11.91 m (39 ft 3/4 in) +4.7	Natalia Jiménez (MEX)	10.81 m (35 ft 5 1/2 in) +3.7
Shot put (3 kg)	María Fernanda Flores (MEX)	14.99 m (49 ft 2 in)	Treneese Hamilton (DMA)	14.65 m (48 ft 0 in)	Mariana Almeyda (MEX)	14.05 m (46 ft 1 in)
Discus throw	Shanice Hutson (BAR)	42.02 m (137 ft 10 in)	Alejandra Rosales (ESA)	41.91 m (137 ft 6 in)	Carolina Quiñonez (MEX)	37.58 m (123 ft 3 in)
Hammer throw (3 kg)	Paola Bueno (MEX)	59.43 m (194 ft 11 in)	Catherina Blouin (CAN)	56.53 m (185 ft 5 in)	Yanielys Torres (PUR)	50.90 m (166 ft 11 in)
Javelin throw	Xochitl Montoya (MEX)	48.53 m (159 ft 2 in)	Rhema Otabor (BAH)	47.68 m (156 ft 5 in)	Paulina Cazares (MEX)	45.26 m (148 ft 5 in)

=== U18 mixed ===
Event	Gold		Silver		Bronze	
4 × 400 metres relay	Trinidad and Tobago; Jessiah Jones; Rae-Anne Serville; Taejha Badal; Saeed Pompey	3:26.49	Jamaica; Deandre Watkin; Daniella Deer; Kenya Thompson; Devontie Archer	3:28.14	Canada; Angelina Shandro; Gage Marshall; Krystalann Bechard; Abdullahi Hassan	3:29.86

== Medal table (U23) ==
* Host nation (Mexico)

Rank	Nation	Gold	Silver	Bronze	Total
1	United States (USA)	27	23	6	56
2	Jamaica (JAM)	5	6	5	16
3	Mexico (MEX)*	4	3	10	17
4	Canada (CAN)	1	2	8	11
5	Barbados (BAR)	1	1	1	3
5	Cuba (CUB)	1	1	1	3
5	Grenada (GRN)	1	1	1	3
8	Trinidad and Tobago (TRI)	1	1	0	2
9	Puerto Rico (PUR)	0	1	3	4
10	Bahamas (BAH)	0	1	1	2
11	Guatemala (GUA)	0	1	0	1
12	El Salvador (ESA)	0	0	2	2
13	Honduras	0	0	1	1
Totals (13 entries)		41	41	39	121

== Medal table (U18) ==
* Host nation (Mexico)

Rank	Nation	Gold	Silver	Bronze	Total
1	Mexico (MEX)*	15	12	19	46
2	Jamaica (JAM)	13	7	3	23
3	Canada (CAN)	5	7	5	17
4	Bahamas (BAH)	2	2	0	4
5	Trinidad and Tobago (TRI)	2	1	2	5
6	Barbados (BAR)	1	4	0	5
7	Bermuda (BER)	1	0	1	2
8	Puerto Rico (PUR)	0	2	2	4
9	El Salvador (ESA)	0	1	3	4
10	Costa Rica (CRC)	0	1	2	3
11	Antigua and Barbuda (ATG)	0	1	0	1
11	Dominica (DMA)	0	1	0	1
13	Saint Vincent and the Grenadines (VIN)	0	0	1	1
Totals (13 entries)		39	39	38	116

== Participation (U23) ==
- Antigua and Barbuda (2)
- Bahamas (10)
- Barbados (6)
- Belize (2)
- Bermuda (1)
- British Virgin Islands (5)
- Canada (25)
- Cayman Islands (4)
- Costa Rica (2)
- Cuba (4)
- Dominica (3)
- Dominican Republic (2)
- Grenada (3)
- Guadeloupe (2)
- Guatemala (8)
- Haiti (2)
- Honduras (1)
- Jamaica (26)
- Mexico (76)
- Puerto Rico (6)
- Saint Lucia (1)
- El Salvador (7)
- Trinidad and Tobago (3)
- Turks and Caicos Islands (3)
- United States (71)
- United States Virgin Islands (6)
