= Mariam Abdul-Rashid =

Canadian athlete (born 1997)

Personal information
- Nationality: Canadian
- Born: 21 September 1997 (age 28) Ajax, Ontario

Sport
- Sport: Athletics
- Event: Hurdles

Achievements and titles
- Personal bests: 60m: 6.37 (Saskatoon, 2024); 60m hurdles: 7.99 (Glasgow, 2024); 100m: 11.36 (Baton Rouge, 2024); 100m hurdles: 12.60 (Paris, 2024)
Medal record
Women's athletics
Representing Canada
NACAC U23 Championships
Bronze medal – third place	2019 Queretaro	100 m hurdles

Mariam Abdul-Rashid (born 21 September 1997) is a Canadian track and field athlete who competes as a sprint hurdler.

== Early life ==
From Oshawa, she started training in athletics when she was six years old. She attended Eastdale Collegiate school and trained with the Speed Academy in Pickering, Ontario prior to signing a letter of intent at 17 years-of-age to run with a scholarship at the University of Texas.

== Career ==
=== Junior career ===
Initially just a sprinter, she started to compete in hurdles in 2014. She won three gold medals at the Canadian youth championships in 2014 and finished fifth in the 400m hurdles at the 2014 World Junior Championships in Athletics.

Abdul-Rashid finished 8th in 400m hurdles at 2016 IAAF World U20 Championships in Poland.

She was a bronze medalist in the 100m hurdles at the 2019 NACAC U18 and U23 Championships in Athletics in Querétaro, Mexico.

=== Senior career ===
Abdul-Rashid finished second in the 100m hurdles at the Canadian Track and Field Championships in July 2023, running 12.83 seconds, 0.01 of a second behind winner Michelle Harrison. She was subsequently selected for the 2023 World Athletics Championships in August 2023. Competing in Budapest, she finished sixth in her heat in a time of 13.04 seconds.

She ran a personal best time of 8.01 seconds to in the women's 60m hurdles in Clemson, South Carolina in February 2024. Abdul-Rashid was selected as part of the Canadian team for the 2024 World Athletics Indoor Championships in Glasgow to compete in the 60 metres hurdles, where she qualified for the semi-finals and set a new personal best time of 7.99 seconds.

She competed in the 100m hurdles at the 2024 Paris Olympics, reaching the semi-finals.

She won the 100 metres hurdles at the 2025 Canadian Track and Field Championships in 12.84 seconds. She placed fourth overall in the 100 metres hurdles at the 2025 NACAC Championships in Freeport, The Bahamas in 13.07 seconds (-1.1). She subsequently competed at the 2025 World Athletics Championships in Tokyo, Japan.

Abdul-Rashid won the 60 metres hurdles at the 2026 Canadian Indoor Championships, running a Championship record time of 8.03 seconds. In March 2026, she ran in the 60 metres hurdles at the 2026 World Athletics Indoor Championships in Toruń, Poland, reaching the semi-finals. She competed in the 100 metres hurdles at the 2026 Commonwealth Games in Glasgow, Scotland.

== Personal life ==
Abdul-Rashid has earned a Masters degree in Communications & Media Studies from the University of East London, and a Bachelor's degree in Liberal Arts & Sciences from the University of Texas.
