= Shalysa Wray =

Caymanian sprinter

Personal information
- Born: 6 May 1999 (age 27) Cayman Islands

Sport
- Country: Cayman Islands
- Sport: Athletics
- Events: 100 m, 200 m, 400 m

Achievements and titles
- Highest world ranking: 400 m: 144 (2022); 200 m: 383 (2024); 100 m: 831 (2019)
- Personal bests: 400 m: 52.17 (2022); 200 m: 23.85 (2024); 100 m: 11.61 (2024)

Shalysa Wray (born 6 May 1999) is a Caymanian sprinter whose events include the 100, 200 and 400 metres. She won silver in the 400 metres at the 2017 Island Games and represented the Cayman Islands in the women's 400 metres at the 2020 Summer Olympics in Tokyo, becoming the first Caymanian woman to contest the event at the Olympics. She also competed at the 2022 Commonwealth Games and the 2024 World Indoor Championships.

She set Caymanian national records in the outdoor and indoor 400 metres. She competed at the college level for Xavier University of Louisiana and Kansas State University, earning All-America honours in four events at the 2019 National Association of Intercollegiate Athletics Outdoor Championships.

== Early life ==
Shalysa Wray was born on 6 May 1999 in the Cayman Islands, a British Overseas Territory located in the Western Caribbean. Her parents and both grandmothers were distance runners. She was recruited by a high school in Jamaica to train in athletics and attended St Jago High School. Representing the school at the 2018 Jamaican national junior championships, she finished second in the under-20 400 metres in 55.29 seconds.

She was the first member of her family to attend college. She enrolled at Xavier University of Louisiana in New Orleans in January 2019 to study business management, before transferring to Kansas State University in 2020 to study marketing. In June 2023, she received Academic All-District VII honours from College Sports Communicators.

== Running career ==
=== Youth and junior career ===
Wray competed in the under-18 200 metres at the 2015 CARIFTA Games in Basseterre, Saint Kitts and Nevis, running 24.96 seconds in the heats, and did not qualify for the final. Later that year, she competed in the 100 and 200 metres at the World Youth Championships in Cali, Colombia, where she was eliminated in the heats of both events. At the 2017 Island Games in Gotland, Sweden, she won silver in the 400 metres in 56.33 seconds, behind Catherine Reid of the Isle of Man. The following year, she placed fourth at the under-20 400 metres at the CARIFTA Games in Nassau, Bahamas, in 54.63 seconds.

Wray reached the 400-metre semi-finals at the 2018 World U20 Championships in Tampere, Finland, where she ran 54.32 seconds. Wray began competing for Xavier in the 2018–19 season. At the 2019 Gulf Coast Athletic Conference Championships, she won the 100 and 400 metres and finished second in the 200 metres, setting university records in the 200 and 400 metres.

=== Senior career ===
Wary won the 100 and 400 metres and finished second in the 200 metres at the 2019 Gulf Coast Athletic Conference Championships, setting university records in the 200 and 400 metres. At the 2019 National Association of Intercollegiate Athletics (NAIA) Outdoor Championships, she earned All-America honours in the 100 metres, 200 metres, 4 × 100 metres relay and 4 × 400 metres relay. Competing as a freshman, she was the only woman to score in four events at the meet. She came fourth at the under-23 200 metres at the 2019 North American, Central American and Caribbean (NACAC) Under-23 Championships in Querétaro, Mexico.

She won the 60 metres at the Kansas–Kansas State–Wichita State Triangular in January 2021 in 7.51 seconds. In February, Wray said she hoped to succeed Cydonie Mothersill as the fastest Caymanian woman, describing her recent performances as encouragement towards that goal. That month, she placed fifth in the 400 metres at the 2021 Big 12 Indoor Championships in 53.40 seconds. She finished fourth at the under-23 400 metres at the 2021 NACAC Under-23 Championships in Costa Rica.

Wray received an invitation from the Olympic Games Tripartite Commission to compete at the 2020 Summer Olympics in Tokyo, held in 2021. She trained in Jamaica over the summer under a programme set by coach Cliff Rovelto, then in Florida, before attending a training camp in Tokyo about a week before the Olympic Village opened. Wray became the first Caymanian woman to compete in the Olympic 400 metres, finishing seventh in her heat in a personal-best 53.61 seconds without advancing to the semi-finals. In January 2023, Wray said that the experience of competing at the Olympics had reduced her nervousness before taking part in subsequent meets. At the inaugural Junior Pan American Games in Cali, Colombia, later that year, she finished fifth in the 400-metre final in 53.47 seconds, improving her outdoor personal best.

In January 2022, she improved her 60-metre personal best to 7.44 seconds at the Triangular meet and ran a 300-metre personal best of 38.21 seconds at the Kansas State DeLoss Dodds Invitational. She ran 52.17 seconds on 14 May in the 400-metre preliminary round of the Big 12 Outdoor Championships in Lubbock, Texas, setting a Caymanian national record.

At the 2022 NCAA Outdoor Championships in June 2022, Wray finished 23rd in the 400-metre semi-finals in 52.94 seconds. She also competed in the 4 × 400 metres relay at the championships. The same month, she won the 200 metres and 400 metres at the Cayman Islands National Championships in 23.58 and 53.23 seconds respectively. At the 2022 Commonwealth Games, she ran 53.92 seconds, tying for sixth in her 400-metre heat.

She improved her 60-metre personal best to 7.38 seconds at the Kansas–Kansas State–Wichita State Triangular in January 2023, setting a venue record at the Washburn Indoor Athletic Facility. She ran an indoor 200-metre personal best of 23.85 seconds at the same event. In an interview that month, she credited her progress to training prescribed by Kansas State coach Rovelto, which she continued with assistance from her national coach during a Christmas visit to the Cayman Islands. Later that month, she won the 300 metres at the DeLoss Dodds Invitational in a personal-best 37.80 seconds, setting a meet record. She improved her indoor 200-metre best again, to 23.69 seconds, at the Steve Miller Invitational in February. At the Big 12 Indoor Championships on 25 February, she finished sixth in the 400 metres in 53.20 seconds, a Caymanian indoor record.

In June 2023, Wray won the women's 200 metres at the Cayman Islands National Championships in 24.15 seconds. At the 2023 Central American and Caribbean Games in San Salvador, she placed sixth in her 400-metre semi-final in 55.68 seconds and finished 12th overall. She won the 300 metres at the 2024 Steve Miller Invitational in 39.08 seconds, setting meet and venue records at the Cliff Rovelto Indoor Track. The 2024 World Athletics Indoor Championships in Glasgow saw her finish sixth in her 400-metre heat. In June 2024, she won the 400 metres at the Penn Relays Summer Showcase in 55.37 seconds. As of October 2026, she has not competed since 2024 according to her record on the World Athletics website.

== Personal bests ==
Personal bests
Discipline	Performance	Date	Venue	Notes
60 Metres	7.44 i	14 Jan 2022	Anschutz Sports Pavillion, Lawrence (USA)	
100 Metres	11.61 w	3 May 2024	Cessna Stadium, Wichita (USA)	Not legal; Wind: +2.9
100 Metres	11.67	22 April 2023	Clyde Hart Track & Field Stadium, Waco (USA)	Wind: +1.4
200 Metres	23.85	3 May 2024	Cessna Stadium, Wichita (USA)	Wind: +0.7
200 Metres Short Track	23.86 i	3 February 2023	Convention Center, Albuquerque (USA)	
300 Metres	38.21 i	22 January 2022	Ahearn Field House, Manhattan (USA)	
300 Metres Short Track	38.21 i	22 January 2022	Ahearn Field House, Manhattan (USA)	
400 Metres	52.17 (NR)	14 May 2022	Terry & Linda Fuller T&F Complex, Lubbock (USA)	
400 Metres Short Track	53.20 (NR) i	25 February 2023	Sports Performance Center, Lubbock (USA)	
4×100 Metres Relay	44.86	15 May 2022	Terry & Linda Fuller T&F Complex, Lubbock (USA)	
4×400 Metres Relay	3:32.91	24 Apr 2021	John Jacobs Track Complex, Norman (USA)	
4×400 Metres Relay Short Track	3:37.93 i	27 February 2021	Sports Performance Center, Lubbock (USA)	
Distance Medley	11:24.82 i	25 February 2022	Lied Recreation Center, Ames (USA)	

== International competitions ==
International competition results
Year	Competition	Event	Round	Placing in round/heat	Time (seconds)	Ref.
2015	CARIFTA Games (under-18)	100 metres	Heats	11th in round	12.18	
2015	CARIFTA Games (under-18)	200 metres	Heats	9th in round	24.96	
2015	World Youth Championships	100 metres	Heats	6th in heat	12.40	
2015	World Youth Championships	200 metres	Heats	5th in heat	25.01	
2017	Island Games	400 metres	Final	2nd	56.33	
2018	CARIFTA Games (under-20)	400 metres	Final	4th	54.63	
2018	World U20 Championships	400 metres	Heats	4th in heat	54.48	
2018	World U20 Championships	400 metres	Semi-finals	18th in round	54.32	
2019	NACAC Under-23 Championships	100 metres	Heats	11th in round	11.93	
2019	NACAC Under-23 Championships	200 metres	Final	4th	24.39	
2021	NACAC Under-23 Championships	400 metres	Final	4th	54.42	
2021	2020 Summer Olympics	400 metres	Heats	37th in round	53.61	
2021	Junior Pan American Games	400 metres	Final	5th	53.47	
2022	Commonwealth Games	400 metres	Heats	Joint 6th in heat	53.92	
2023	Central American and Caribbean Games	400 metres	Semi-finals	12th in round	55.68	
2024	World Indoor Championships	400 metres	Heats	6th in heat	55.82	
