= Ashley Williams (sprinter) =

Jamaican athlete (born 1996)

Personal information
- Nationality: Jamaican
- Born: 25 October 1996 (age 30)

Sport
- Sport: Track and field
- Event: 400 m

Achievements and titles
- Personal best: 400 m: 51.16 (2024)
Medal record
Women's athletics
Representing Jamaica
Pan American U20 Athletics Championships
Silver medal – second place	2015 Edmonton	4x100 m relay
Silver medal – second place	2015 Edmonton	4×400 m relay

Ashley Williams (born 25 October 1996) is a Jamaican sprinter.

== Early life ==
She attended Holmwood Technical High School in Jamaica.

== Career ==
In April 2024, she was selected as part of the Jamiacan team for the 2024 World Athletics Relays in Nassau, Bahamas. She ran the third leg of the women's 4 × 400 m relay as they won their second qualifying heat to secure qualification for the 2024 Olympics. In June 2024, she finished fifth at the Jamaican Olympic trials over 400 metres, having run a personal best of 51.16 seconds in the semi final. She competed in the women's 4 x 400 metres relay at the 2024 Paris Olympics.

== Personal life ==
She has been nicknamed the "Jamaican Allyson Felix" due to a perceived similarity in their running style and physique.
