= Isaiah Jewett =

American middle-distance runner (born 1997)

- Jewett competes at the 2020 US Olympic Trials

Personal information
- Full name: Isaiah Champion Jewett
- Born: February 6, 1997 (age 29) Beverly Hills, California, U.S.
- Home town: Inglewood, California, U.S.
- Education: University of Southern California
- Height: 6 ft 0 in (183 cm)

Sport
- Country: United States
- Sport: Track and field
- Events: 400m, 800m
- College team: USC Trojans

Achievements and titles
- Personal bests: 400 m: 45.96 (Los Angeles 2021); 800 m: 1:43.85 (Eugene, 2021); 1500 m: 3:57.70 (Long Beach 2021)
Medal record
Men's athletics
Representing United States
NACAC U23 Championships in Athletics
Silver medal – second place	2019 Queretaro	800 metres

Isaiah Champion Jewett (born February 6, 1997) is an American middle-distance runner who specializes in the 800 metres. He finished second in the event at the NACAC U23 Championships in 2019, and he won a national title at the 2021 NCAA Outdoor Championships while competing for the University of Southern California. Jewett represented the United States at the 2020 Summer Olympics.

== Junior and collegiate competition ==
Jewett attended Culver City High School before transferring to Cathedral High School in Los Angeles. As a high schooler, he primarily focused on the 400 metres. For college, he attended the University of California, Irvine, where he began competing in the 800 metres. He went undefeated in the 2017 regular season, and he won the Big West Championship. After his sophomore year, Jewett switched schools to compete for the University of Southern California. In an interview about his decision to transfer, he stated: "I transferred from UC Irvine to USC because there were better opportunities academically" and "track wise, USC makes champions and I wanted to be a champion." The transfer required him to sit out the 2018 collegiate season due to NCAA eligibility rules, so he ran unattached in USATF events.

In 2019, Jewett won a silver medal in the 800 m at the NACAC U23 Championships in Queretaro, Mexico. At the 2021 NCAA Outdoor Championships, Jewett won an NCAA title in the 800 m, besting runner up Brandon Miller. His time of 1:44.68 was a school record, ahead of alumni who went on to compete in the Olympics, including Ibrahim Okash and Duane Solomon.

== Senior competition ==
On June 21, 2021, Jewett finished runner up at the 2020 US Olympic Trials in Eugene, Oregon, behind Olympic bronze medalist Clayton Murphy. His time of 1:43.85 was a personal best, and it qualified him for the 2020 Summer Games in Tokyo. This performance carried extra meaning for Jewett because it came nearly on the anniversary of his brother Robert's death, who died in an automobile accident eight years prior. Jewett was also a college student at the time, and after the race, he had to complete a 10-page essay by midnight, as his academic program did not allow an extension.

In the 800 m at the 2020 Summer Games, Jewett ran 1:47.07 in a preliminary round to advance to the semi-finals. There, he collided with 2012 silver medalist Nijel Amos, with the two runners becoming tangled in the final stretch of the race. Jewett helped Amos to his feet, and they crossed the finish line together. Referees granted Amos a place in the final but did not allow Jewett to advance.

Competing at the 2023 USA Outdoor Track and Field Championships, Jewett reached the final of the 800 m, where he finished fourth. He secured the standard time for the 2024 Paris Olympics in finishing runner-up in the 800 metres at the LA Grand Prix in May 2024.

In February 2025, he was runner-up to Will Sumner over 600 metres at the Millrose Games in New York City. He reached the semi-finals of the 800 metres at the 2025 USA Outdoor Track and Field Championships but missed a place in the final after being out-leaned on the line by Cooper Lutkenhaus. Jewett placed third behind Lutkenhaus and Jenoah McKiver over 600 metres at the Millrose Games in February 2026. On 1 March 2026, he was a finalist in the 800 metres at the 2026 USA Indoor Track and Field Championships, placing fourth overall.

== Personal life ==
Jewett was born with a condition that made one eye weak and sensitive to light, contributing to migraines. He started wearing sunglasses to lessen symptoms like blurred vision and trouble visualizing competitors while running. In college, Jewett studied animation, owing to his interest in anime, which he has described as a source of motivation for his running. In the Los Angeles Times, he was quoted as saying that he wanted to provide inspiration to people watching the Tokyo Olympics "the way anime and cartoons inspired me." His mother, Venus is a Masters World Champion sprinter. She started a track and field program at Culver City Middle School, then coached at Culver City High School for over a decade.
