= 2015 Pan American Junior Athletics Championships =

XVIII Pan American Junior Athletics Championships
- Dates: July 31-August 2
- Host city: Edmonton, Alberta, Canada
- Venue: Foote Field
- Level: Junior
- Events: 44
- Participation: 418 athletes from 31 nations

The 2015 Pan American Junior Championships was the eighteenth edition of the biennial track and field competition for Under-20 athletics from the Americas, organised by the Association of Panamerican Athletics. It was held in Edmonton, Alberta, Canada, at the Foote Field from 31 July to 2 August.

A detailed report of the event and an analysis of the results was given for the IAAF.

== Medal summary ==
Complete results were published.

=== Men ===
Event	Gold		Silver		Bronze	
100 metres (wind: +0.4 m/s)	Reynier Mena; Cuba	10.17	Noah Lyles; United States	10.18	Christian Coleman; United States	10.32
200 metres (wind: +1.3 m/s)	Noah Lyles; United States	20.27	Reynier Mena; Cuba	20.34	Ryan Clark; United States	20.62
400 metres	Jamal Walton; Cayman Islands	46.09	My'Lik Kerley; United States	46.33	Renardo Wilson; Jamaica	46.59
800 metres	Carlton Orange; United States	1:48.06	Robert Heppenstall; Canada	1:48.70	Robert Ford; United States	1:48.90
1500 metres	Blake Haney; United States	3:56.49	Brandon Pollard; United States	3:56.51	Rodrigo Silva; Brazil	3:56.73
5000 metres	Matthew Maton; United States	14:20.58	Cerake Geberkidane; United States	14:28.45	Daniel Ferreira do Nascimento; Brazil	14:31.81
10000 metres	Connor Hendrickson; United States	30:46.66	Vidal Basco; Bolivia	30:50.08	Chase Weaverling; United States	30:53.13
3000 metres steeplechase	Bailey Roth; United States	9:02.45	Nicolas Antonio Silva; Brazil	9:13.44	Tyler Ranke; United States	9:16.44
110 metres hurdles (99.0 cm) (wind: +1.2 m/s)	Misana Viltz; United States	13.30	Roger Iribarne; Cuba	13.32	Ricardo Torres; Puerto Rico	13.49
400 metres hurdles	Norman Grimes; United States	50.10	Kenny Selmon; United States	50.29	Marvin Williams; Jamaica	50.44
4 x 100 metres relay	Jamaica; Seanie Selvin; Shivnarine Smalling; Hujaye Cornwall; Xandre Blake	40.15	Bahamas; Javan Martin; Janeko Cartwright; Ian Kerr; Kendrick Thompson	40.32	Trinidad and Tobago; Francis Louis; Joash Huggins; Corey Stewart; Nathan Farinha	40.50
4 x 400 metres relay	United States; Quintaveon Poole; Wiliam Allen; Norman Grimes; My'Lik Kerley	3:07.07 WJL	Jamaica; Ivan Henry; Marvin Williams; Demar Weller; Renardo Wilson	3:08.23	Canada; Daniel Brady; Matthew Bedard; Ramzi Abdullahi; Matthew Leliever	3:09.91
10000 metres walk	César Rodríguez; Peru	42:12.81	Diego Fernando Cuéllar; Colombia	43:04.31	Óscar Armando Menjívar; El Salvador	44:31.74
High jump	Randall Cunningham; United States	2.16m	Luis Zayas; Cuba	2.16m	Clayton Brown; Jamaica	2.13m
Pole vault	Paulo Benavides; United States	5.40m	Audie Wyatt; United States	5.35m	José Rodolfo Pacho; Ecuador	5.35m
Long jump	Juan Miguel Echevarria; Cuba	7.76m (w: +0.1 m/s)	Laquan Nairn; Bahamas	7.65m w (w: +2.7 m/s)	Keandre Bates; United States	7.54m (w: +1.6 m/s)
Triple jump	Leslie Caesa; Cuba	16.83m w (w: +2.1 m/s)	Lázaro Martínez; Cuba	16.52m w (w: +2.4 m/s)	Obrien Wasome; Jamaica	16.17m (w: +0.9 m/s)
Shot put (6 kg)	John Maurins; United States	19.49m	Ayomidotun Ogundeji; United States	19.20m	Demar Gayle; Jamaica	18.56m
Discus throw (1.75 kg)	Payton Otterdahl; United States	57.96m	Demar Gayle; Jamaica	55.98m	José Miguel Ballivián; Chile	54.43m
Hammer throw (6 kg)	Humberto Mansilla; Chile	80.21m CR	Gabriel Kehr; Chile	74.42m	Joaquín Gómez; Argentina	73.65m
Javelin throw	Christopher Mirabelli; United States	72.63m	Anderson Peters; Grenada	72.11m	Curtis Thompson; United States	71.11m
Decathlon (Junior)	Harrison Williams; United States	8037 CR WJL	Travis Toliver; United States	7346	Nathaniel Mechler; Canada	7045

=== Women ===
Event	Gold		Silver		Bronze	
100 metres (wind: -0.6 m/s)	Khalifa St. Fort; Trinidad and Tobago	11.31	Aleia Hobbs; United States	11.50	Teahna Daniels; United States	11.54
200 metres (wind: +1.7 m/s)	DeAnna Hill; United States	23.18	Vitória Cristina Rosa; Brazil	23.42	Sada Williams; Barbados	23.49
400 metres	Kendra Clarke; Canada	52.55	Sada Williams; Barbados	52.75	Kendall Ellis; United States	52.81
800 metres	Raevyn Rogers; United States	2:04.62	Priscilla Morales; Puerto Rico	2:08.46	Evelyne Guay; Canada	2:08.52
1500 metres	Kate Murphy; United States	4:21.36	Arlety Thaureaux; Cuba	4:22.79	Sarah Feeny; United States	4:23.21
3000 metres	Erin Dietz; United States	9:37.51	Mirelle Martens; Canada	9:41.20	Saida Meneses; Peru	9:43.91
5000 metres	Rachael Reddy; United States	16:23.35 CR	Anne-Marie Comeau; Canada	16:35.38	Caroline Alcorta; United States	16:48.48
3000 metres steeplechase	Charlotte Prouse; Canada	10:12.44	Hannah Christen; United States	10:24.32	Alexandra Harris; United States	10:31.79
100 metres hurdles (wind: -1.7 m/s)	Dior Hall; United States	13.20	Maribel Caicedo; Ecuador	13.45	Daeshon Gordon; Jamaica	13.70
400 metres hurdles	Anna Cockrell; United States	57.10	Taysia Radoslav; Canada	59.08	Tia-Adana Belle; Barbados	1:00.03
4 x 100 metres relay	United States; Teahna Daniels; Aleia Hobbs; Mikiah Brisco; Deanna Hill	43.79	Jamaica; Kimone Hines; Jonielle Smith; Ashley Williams; Sashalee Forbes	44.31	Bahamas; Blayre Catalyn; Jenae Ambrose; Jerinique Brooks; Keianna Albury	45.96
4 x 400 metres relay	United States; Zola Golden; Olivia Baker; Kendall Ellis; Raevyn Rogers	3:31.49 WJL	Jamaica; Candice McLeod; Ashley Williams; Roneisha McGregor; Dawnalee Loney	3:38.77	Canada; Erinn Stenman-Fahey; Evelyne Guay; Taylor Sharpe; Taysia Radoslav	3:40.00
10000 metres walk	Stefany Coronado; Bolivia	47:05.11 CR	Karla Jaramillo; Ecuador	47:47.61	Daniela Fernanda Pastrana; Colombia	48:57.09
High jump	Vashti Cunningham; United States	1.96m CR =WYR =WJL	Ximena Esquivel; Mexico	1.83m	Ana Paula Oliveira; Brazil	1.80m
Pole vault	Robeilys Peinado; Venezuela	4.10m	Sara Kathryn Stevens; United States	4.00m	Juliana Menis Campos; Brazil	4.00m
Long jump	Samiyah Samuels; United States	6.23m (w: +0.3 m/s)	Courtney Corrin; United States	6.13m (w: +0.0 m/s)	Letícia Oro Melo; Brazil	6.05m (w: +0.3 m/s)
Triple jump	Núbia Soares; Brazil	14.16m w (w: +3.0 m/s)	Liadagmis Povea; Cuba	14.08m CR (w: +0.0 m/s)	Chinne Okoronkwo; United States	12.83m w (w: +2.1 m/s)
Shot put	Raven Saunders; United States	18.27m CR	Portious Warren; Trinidad and Tobago	15.57m	Sophia Rivera; United States	15.34m
Discus throw	Josephine Natrasevchi; United States	52.60m	Lloydricia Cameron; United States	51.98m	Shanice Love; Jamaica	51.52m
Hammer throw	Haley Showalter; United States	58.45m	Lena Giger; United States	57.99m	Mayra Gaviria; Colombia	57.78m
Javelin throw	Yuleimis Aguilar; Cuba	63.86m WJR CR	Estefany Chacón; Venezuela	53.73m	Eloah Scramin; Brazil	53.38m
Heptathlon	Ashtin Zamzow; United States	5462	Fiorella Chiappe; Argentina	5313	Ayesha Champagnie; Jamaica	5245

== Medal table (unofficial) ==
* Host nation (Canada)

Rank	Nation	Gold	Silver	Bronze	Total
1	United States	30	14	14	58
2	Cuba	4	6	0	10
3	Canada*	2	4	4	10
4	Jamaica	1	4	8	13
5	Brazil	1	2	6	9
6	Chile	1	1	1	3
6	Trinidad and Tobago	1	1	1	3
8	Bolivia	1	1	0	2
8	Venezuela	1	1	0	2
10	Peru	1	0	1	2
11	Cayman Islands	1	0	0	1
12	Bahamas	0	2	1	3
12	Ecuador	0	2	1	3
14	Barbados	0	1	2	3
14	Colombia	0	1	2	3
16	Argentina	0	1	1	2
16	Puerto Rico	0	1	1	2
18	Grenada	0	1	0	1
18	Mexico	0	1	0	1
20	El Salvador	0	0	1	1
Totals (20 entries)		44	44	44	132

== Participation ==
According to an unofficial count, 418 athletes from 31 countries participated. The announced athletes from Saint Lucia did not show.

- Anguilla (1)
- Antigua and Barbuda (1)
- Argentina (7)
- Bahamas (20)
- Barbados (7)
- Belize (2)
- Bolivia (5)
- Brazil (28)
- British Virgin Islands (8)
- Canada (60)
- Cayman Islands (6)
- Chile (17)
- Colombia (28)
- Cuba (13)
- Ecuador (10)
- El Salvador (3)
- Grenada (2)
- Guatemala (1)
- Guyana (4)
- Jamaica (35)
- Mexico (13)
- Panama (3)
- Paraguay (2)
- Peru (16)
- Puerto Rico (12)
- Saint Kitts and Nevis (5)
- Trinidad and Tobago (16)
- Turks and Caicos Islands (2)
- United States (82)
- U.S. Virgin Islands (3)
- Venezuela (6)
