= Tonea Marshall =

American hurdler (born 1998)

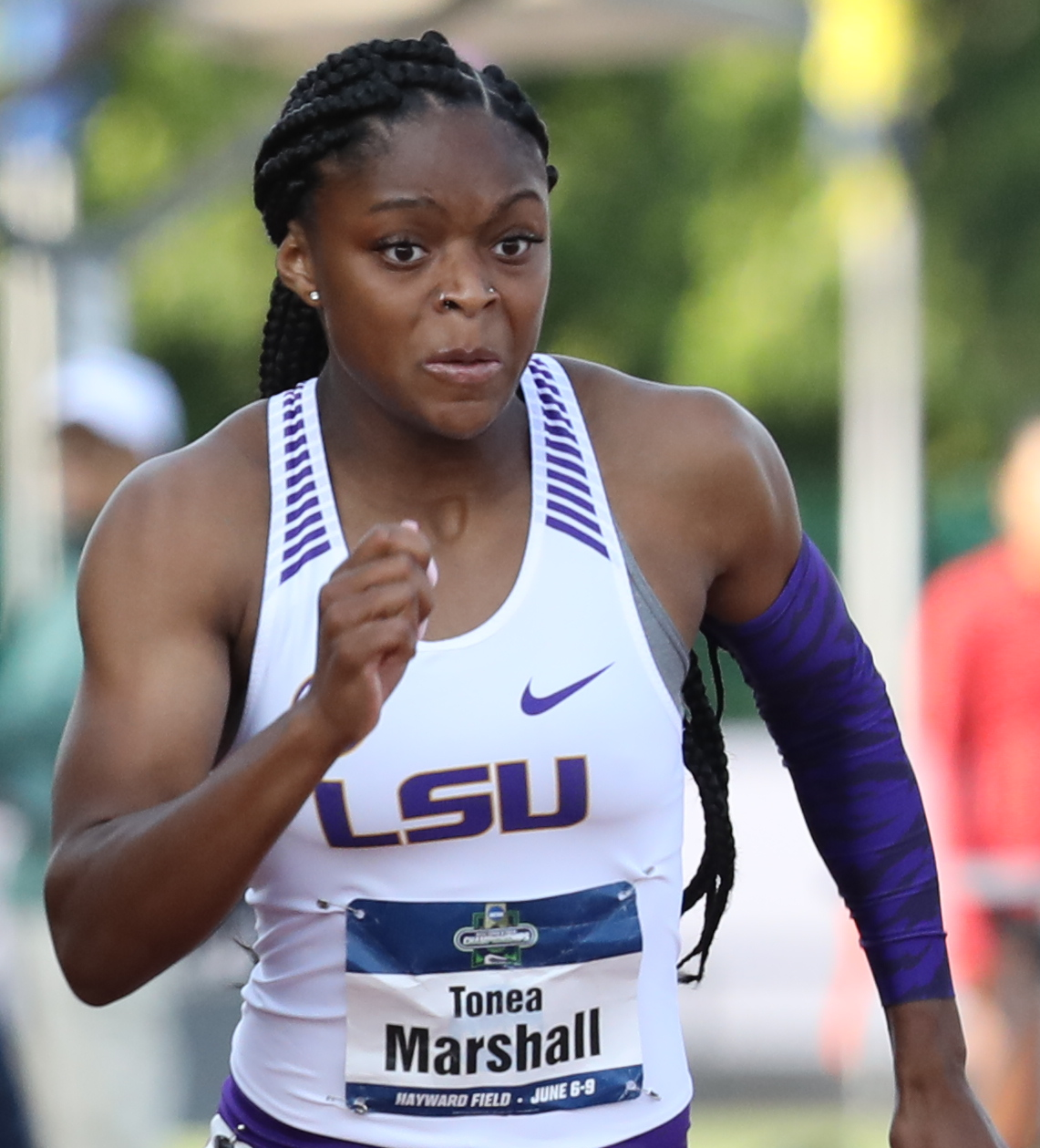
- Marshall at the 2018 NCAA Division I Outdoor Track and Field Championships semi-finals

Personal information
- Full name: Tonea Alexis Marshall
- Nationality: United States
- Born: October 17, 1998 (age 27)
- Home town: Arlington, Texas
- Education: Seguin High School; Louisiana State University
- Height: 180 cm (5 ft 11 in)
- Weight: 75 kg (165 lb)

Sport
- Sport: Athletics
- Events: 100 metres hurdles 60 metres hurdles
- College team: LSU Lady Tigers

Achievements and titles
- National finals: 2015 USA U18s; • 100 m hurdles, 3rd (bronze); 2016 USA U20s; • 100 m hurdles, 8th; 2018 NCAA Indoors; • 60 m hurdles, 7th; 2018 NCAAs; • 100 m hurdles, 6th; 2019 NCAAs; • 100 m hurdles, 3rd (bronze); • 4 × 100 m, 2nd (silver); 2019 USA Champs; • 100 m hurdles, 6th; 2021 NCAAs; • 4 × 100 m, 2nd (silver); 2021 USA Champs; • 100 m hurdles, 6th; 2022 USA Champs; • 100 m hurdles, 4th; 2023 USA Indoors; • 60 m hurdles, 2nd (silver); 2023 USA Champs; • 100 m hurdles, 6th
- Personal bests: 60 mH: 7.85 (Albuquerque 2025); 100 mH: 12.24 (Chorzów 2025)
Medal record
Women's athletics
Representing United States
NACAC U23 Championships
Gold medal – first place	2019 Queretaro	100 m hurdles
- Updated on 15 January 2024

Tonea Alexis Marshall (born 17 October 1998) is an American hurdler specializing in the 100 metres hurdles. She was the gold medalist at the 2019 NACAC U23 Championships in a championship record time, and she was the silver medalist at the 2023 USA Indoor Track and Field Championships in the 60 m hurdles.

== Biography ==
Marshall is from Arlington, Texas where she attended Seguin High School, competing in volleyball and track and field. At Seguin, she set the high school national record in the 55 m and 60 m hurdles, and she was a multiple-time New Balance Indoor Nationals champion in the hurdles.

Marshall's most notable prep victory was at the 2016 New Balance Indoor Nationals in New York, where she was the favorite heading in to the competition. She put together the most impressive three rounds in meeting history, as her first round time was only 0.05 seconds off the national record followed by an 8.08-second national record in the semi-finals and a further improvement of 8.02 seconds in the finals.

From 2017 to 2021, Marshall competed as a member of the LSU Lady Tigers track and field program. She made three individual NCAA Championship finals, with a best performance of 3rd at the 2019 NCAA Division I Outdoor Track and Field Championships.

At the 2019 NACAC U23 Championships, Marshall won the gold medal in the 100 m hurdles in a personal best and championship record time of 12.57 seconds, which was also an LSU school record. The performance was advantaged by the 1,800 metres of elevation in Queretaro providing thinner air for sprinting, allowing for the second-place finisher Chanel Brissett to also break the old meeting record.

Marshall came her closest to making an Olympic team at the 2021 United States Olympic trials, qualifying for the finals and placing 6th. Despite dealing with a left hamstring injury, Marshall took an early lead in the Trials finals but finished 0.1 second outside of the top three required for selection to the 2021 U.S. team.

In 2022, Marshall also competed at the NACAC senior championships, where she won her qualifying heat and finished 4th in the finals.

Marshall achieved her first senior national medal at the 2023 USA Indoor Track and Field Championships, finishing 2nd in the 60 m hurdles behind only Alaysha Johnson. The two were even through all five hurdles, but Marshall lost the title by a lean from Johnson, taking the silver by just 0.02 seconds in a new personal best of 7.85.

=== Circuit performances ===
Grand Slam Track results
Slam	Race group	Event	Pl.	Time	Prize money
2025 Philadelphia Slam	Short hurdles	100 m hurdles	4th	12.68	US$15,000
2025 Philadelphia Slam	Short hurdles	100 m	5th	11.48	US$15,000

== Statistics ==
=== Best performances ===
Event	Mark	Place	Competition	Venue	Date	Ref
100 metres hurdles	12.24 (+0.8 m/s)	1st place, gold medalist(s)	Silesia Diamond League	Chorzów	16 August 2025	
60 metres hurdles	7.85 A	2nd place, silver medalist(s)	USA Indoor Track and Field Championships	Albuquerque, New Mexico	18 February 2023	
