= Anglerne Annelus =

American sprinter (born 1997)

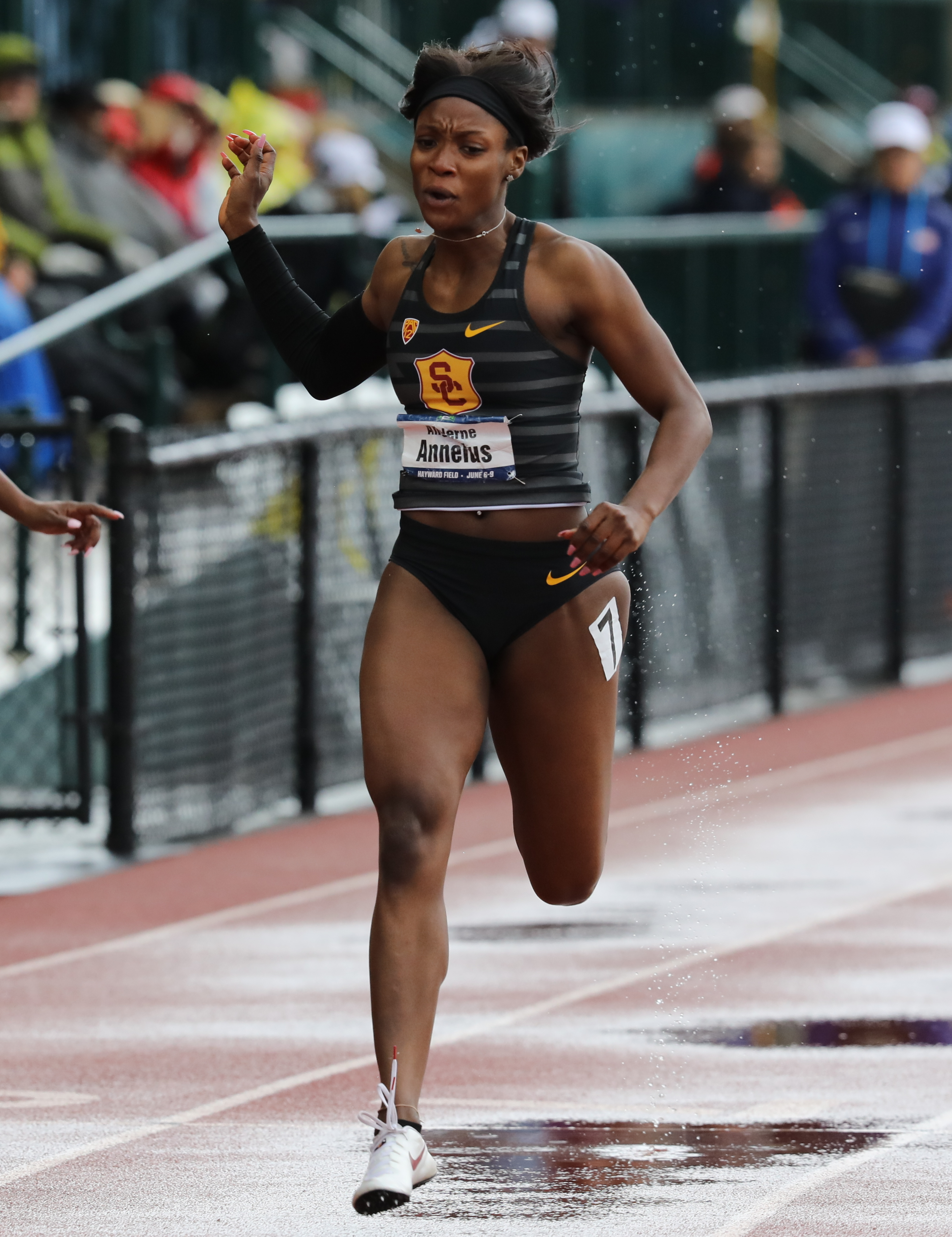
- Annelus at the 2018 NCAA Division I Championships

Personal information
- Nickname: Angie
- Born: January 10, 1997 (age 29) Kansas City, Missouri, U.S.
- Height: 5 ft 6 in (168 cm)

Sport
- Sport: Athletics
- Event: Sprinting
- College team: USC Trojans (2018-2020); UCLA Bruins (2016-2017)
- Coached by: Caryl Smith Gilbert

Achievements and titles
- Personal bests: 200 m: 22.16 (2019); 100 m: 11.06 (2019)
Medal record
Women's athletics
Representing the United States
NACAC U23 Championships
Gold medal – first place	2019 Querétaro	200 m
Gold medal – first place	2019 Querétaro	4×100 m relay

Anglerne "Angie" Annelus (/ˈændʒəliːn/ AN-jə-leen; born January 10, 1997) is an American sprinter. She was the 2018 champion in the women's 200-meter dash at the NCAA Division I Championships despite several months of injury, and successfully defended her title in 2019, out-leaning world under-20 record holder Sha'Carri Richardson by less than a hundredth of a second.

She placed third in the 200 m at the 2019 U.S. Championships, qualifying to represent the United States at the 2019 World Athletics Championships in Doha. In Doha she progressed to the final and placed fourth.

Annelus' father Annessoir was born in Artibonite, Haiti, where he was a captured prisoner as a result of coup d'état. He managed to escape and emigrated to Kansas City shortly after and was a pardoned refugee.
