= Samson Colebrooke =

Bahamian sprinter

Personal information
- Nationality: Bahamian
- Born: 10 May 1997 (age 29) Exuma Island

Sport
- Sport: Running
- Event: Sprints

Achievements and titles
- Personal bests: 100 m: 10.01 (Queretaro, Mexico); 200 m: 20.46 (Jacksonville, Florida
Medal record
Men's athletics
Representing the Bahamas
NACAC U23 Championships
Gold medal – first place	2019 Querétaro	200 m
Silver medal – second place	2019 Querétaro	100 m
Silver medal – second place	2019 Querétaro	4x100 m relay
CAC Junior Championships (Under 18)
Silver medal – second place	2014 Morelia	4x100 m relay
Silver medal – second place	2014 Morelia	4×400 m relay
CARIFTA Games (Junior)
Silver medal – second place	2016 St George's	4×100 m relay
CARIFTA Games (U17)
Silver medal – second place	2014 Fort-de-France	4 x 400 m relay

Samson Colebrooke (born 10 May 1997) is a Bahamian sprinter. He is the fastest born-Bahamian athlete over 100m as Derrick Atkins, the national record holder, was born in Jamaica.

== Early life and career ==
Originally from Exuma in the Bahamas, Colebrooke moved to the United States to study law at Purdue University. In 2019, Colebrooke won silver at the NACAC u23 championship in Mexico.

Due to the emergence of the COVID-19 pandemic, Colebrooke found himself unable to return home before the Bahamas government closed its borders, which resulted in him having to remain in the United States for an extended period.

== Senior career ==
At the 2020 Olympic Games, Colebrooke was drawn in heat two of the 100 metres race, alongside Trayvon Bromell and others. Colebrooke finished 7th in the heat in a time of 10.33 seconds. At the 2022 World Athletics Championships, Colebrooke ran in the 100 metres finishing fifth in his heat in a time of 10.23.

He also ran on the Bahamas' 4 × 100 m relay team at the 2024 World Relays Championships in Nassau, Bahamas.
