= Waseem Williams =

Jamaica sprinter

Personal information
- Born: 8 January 1997 (age 29) Kingston, Jamaica

Sport
- Sport: Track and Field
- Event: Sprints

Achievements and titles
- Personal best(s): 100 m: 10.01 (Queretaro, Mexico); 200 m: 20.62 (Louisville, Kentucky
Medal record
Men's athletics
Representing Jamaica
World Youth Championships
Gold medal – first place	Donetsk 2013	Medley relay
NACAC U23 Championships
Gold medal – first place	2019 Querétaro	100 m
CAC Junior Championships (Under 18)
Gold medal – first place	2014 Morelia	100 m
CARIFTA Games (U17)
Silver medal – second place	2014 Fort-de-France	100 m
Silver medal – second place	2014 Fort-de-France	4x100 m relay

Waseem Williams (born 8 January 1997) is a Jamaican sprinter from Kingston, Jamaica specializing in the 100m and 200m. Williams attended Jamaica College before going on to compete for Purdue University.
