= Nicole Greene =

American high jumper (born 1997)

Personal information
- Born: May 2, 1997 (age 29) Boston, Massachusetts
- Education: Ponte Vedra High School

Sport
- Country: United States
- Sport: Athletics
- Event: High jump
- College team: North Carolina Tar Heels

Achievements and titles
- Personal best: High jump: 1.93 m (6 ft 3 3/4 in) (Eugene 2021)

Nicole Greene (born May 2, 1997) is an American athlete who competes in the high jump.

== Personal life ==
She was born in Boston, Massachusetts as the daughter of Trevor and Deborah Price. She has one brother, Christopher. She was educated at Episcopal School in Jacksonville and Ponte Vedra High School before going on to the University of North Carolina. Greene competed at the US trials in 2021 whilst studying for the Medical College Admission Test. Both her parents are also medical doctors.

== Career ==
Greene was a track athlete until her middle school coach encouraged her to focus on jumping events.

The 2018 NCAA indoor champion and 2019 NCAA outdoor runner-up, she won the NACAC U23 Championships in Querétaro in July 2019 with a jump of 1.87m. In August 2019 she finished 8th in the Pan American Games, held in Lima.

At the 2016 IAAF World U20 Championships in Bydgoszcz she finished fifth in the high jump competition.

Greene finished third at the 2020 U.S. Olympic Trials with a personal best jump of 1.93m. It was the joint-28th highest jump in the world by a woman in 2021. Greene was runner-up to Vashti Cunningham at the 2022 USA Indoor Track and Field Championships held in Spokane, Washington.
