= Shanice Love =

Jamaican discus thrower (born 1997)

Personal information
- Born: 9 June 1997 (age 29)

Sport
- Sport: Athletics
- Event: Discus throw

Shanice Love (born 9 June 1997) is a Jamaican athlete specialising in the discus throw. She represented her country at the 2019 World Championships in Doha without reaching the final.

Her personal best in the event is 62.69 metres set in Austin, Texas, in 2019.

== International competitions ==
Year	Competition	Venue	Position	Event	Notes
Representing Jamaica
2013	CARIFTA Games (U17)	Nassau, Bahamas	5th	Shot put (3 kg)	12.41 m
2013	CARIFTA Games (U17)	Nassau, Bahamas	1st	Discus throw	40.16 m
2014	Central American and Caribbean; Junior Championships (U18)	Morelia, Mexico	8th	Shot put (3 kg)	12.23 m
2014	Central American and Caribbean; Junior Championships (U18)	Morelia, Mexico	2nd	Discus throw	46.83 m
2014	World Junior Championships	Eugene, United States	–	Discus throw	NM
2015	CARIFTA Games (U20)	Basseterre, Saint Kitts and Nevis	1st	Discus throw	49.39 m
2015	Pan American Junior Championships	Edmonton, Canada	3rd	Discus throw	51.52 m
2016	CARIFTA Games (U20)	St. George's, Grenada	1st	Discus throw	52.05 m
2016	World U20 Championships	Bydgoszcz, Poland	–	Discus throw	NM
2019	NACAC U23 Championships	Querétaro City, Mexico	1st	Discus throw	60.14 m
2019	Pan American Games	Lima, Peru	6th	Discus throw	59.82 m
2019	World Championships	Doha, Qatar	16th (q)	Discus throw	59.50 m
