= Keenon Laine =

American high jumper (born 1997)

Personal information
- Nationality: American
- Born: June 12, 1997 (age 29) Versailles, Kentucky

Sport
- Country: United States
- Sport: Track and field
- Event: High Jump

Keenon Laine (born 12 June 1997) is an American track and field athlete who competes in the high jump.

Laine was an All-American jumper for the Western Kentucky Hilltoppers track and field team, placing 8th in the high jump at the 2016 NCAA Division I Outdoor Track and Field Championships.

In 2019, he jumped 2.28 m indoor (Fayetteville, AR), 2.26 m outdoor, then finished sixth at 2019 USA Track & Field Outdoor Championships, then qualifying for the 2019 World Championships in Doha. He finished fifth at the 2019 Pan American Games and won the 2019 NACAC U23 Championships in Querétaro.
