= Austin Cole =

Canadian sprinter

Personal information
- Nationality: Canadian
- Born: 31 October 1998 (age 27)

Sport
- Sport: Athletics
- Event: Sprinting

Austin Cole (born 31 October 1998) is a Canadian athlete. He competed in the mixed 4 × 400 metres relay event at the 2019 World Athletics Championships.
