= Norman Grimes =

American hurdler (born 1998)

Personal information
- Nationality: United States
- Born: January 6, 1998 (age 28) Amarillo, Texas, U.S.

Sport
- Sport: Track and field
- Event: 400 meters hurdles
Medal record
Men's athletics
Representing the United States
World Youth Championships
Gold medal – first place	2015 Cali	400 m hurdles
Gold medal – first place	2015 Cali	4×400 m mixed relay
Pan American Junior Championships
Gold medal – first place	2015 Edmonton	400 m hurdles
Gold medal – first place	2015 Edmonton	4×400 m relay

Norman Grimes (born January 6, 1998) is an American track and field athlete, who specializes in the hurdles. At the 2015 World Youth Championships in Cali, Colombia, he won the gold medal in the 400 m hurdles. He recorded the second-fastest youth time in history, behind the world youth record held by William Wynne. A few weeks later, Grimes won the 400 m hurdles at the Pan American Junior Athletics Championships in Edmonton, Alberta, Canada.

== Personal life ==
Grimes comes from an athletic family. His mother was an athlete in college and his father played football in college. His four sisters are also athletes. Grimes overcame a foot fracture in 2017 and came back strong in 2018.

== Personal bests ==
Event	Time(seconds)	Venue	Date	Meet	Ref
400 m hurdles	49.38	Waco, Texas, USA	May 13, 2018	Big 12 Championships	

- Personal bests are for senior hurdle height. At youth and junior competitions, lower hurdles are used.
