= NACAC U23 Championships in Athletics =

Continental athletic competition

The NACAC U23 Championships in Athletics is an under-23 athletics competition held between the member associations of the North American, Central American and Caribbean Athletic Association (NACAC). Rules and regulations were approved at an extraordinary meeting of the members attending the XVIII Central American and Caribbean Games in Maracaibo, Venezuela held on August 18, 1998. First, the competition was open for athletes aged under-25. The Congress held on the island of Grenada on July 3, 2003, resulted in the reduction of the age limit for its bi-annual championships to athletes under-23 years of age in the year of competition.

== Editions ==
	Year	City	Country	Date	Venue	No. of Events	No. of Athletes
1st	2000	Monterrey	Mexico	August 3–5	Universidad Autónoma de Nuevo León	45	184
2nd	2002	San Antonio	United States	August 9–11	E.M. Stevens Stadium	45	245
3rd	2004	Sherbrooke	Canada	July 30 – August 1	Université de Sherbrooke Stadium	42	243
4th	2006	Santo Domingo	Dominican Republic	July 7–9	Estadio Félix Sánchez	44	373
5th	2008	Toluca	Mexico	July 18–20	Estadio Universitario Alberto Chivo Cordova	44	
6th	2010	Miramar	United States	July 9–11	Ansin Sports Complex	44	257
7th	2012	Irapuato	Mexico	July 6–8	Centro Paralímpico Nacional	44	303
8th	2014	Kamloops	Canada	August 8–10	Hillside Stadium	44	197
9th	2016	San Salvador	El Salvador	July 15–17	Jorge "El Magico" Gonzalez National Stadium	44	
10th	2019	Querétaro	Mexico	July 5–7	Parque Queretaro 2000 Stadium	44	~500
11th	2021	San José	Costa Rica	July 9–11	Costa Rica's National Stadium	35	263
12th	2023	San José	Costa Rica	July 21–23	Costa Rica's National Stadium	42	TBD
13th	2026	Tlaxcala	Mexico	July 18–20	Estadio Una Nueva Historia		TBD

== Medals (2000-2023) ==
NACAC U23 Championships in Athletics

NACAC U20 Championships in Athletics

NACAC U18 Championships in Athletics

Rank	Nation	Gold	Silver	Bronze	Total
1	United States	299	243	106	648
2	Jamaica	48	53	49	150
Totals (2 entries)		347	296	155	798

CAN 45 50 92 187

MEX 39 42 62 143

BAH 17 26 26 69

CUB 14 8 10 32

BAR 10 10 15 35

CRC 5 8 12 25

ESA 5 0 7 12

DOM 4 15 13 32

SKN 4 1 1 6

TTO 3 8 17 28

GUA 3 5 8 16

NCA 3 1 0 4

PUR 2 10 15 27

ISV 2 4 2 8

GRN 2 3 3 8

VIN 2 2 2 6

CAY 1 2 4 7

LCA 1 2 3 6

AHO 1 1 0 2

TKS 1 0 2 3

AIA 1 0 1 2

ANT 0 2 2 4

IVB 0 1 6 7

BER 0 1 3 4

HAI 0 1 3 4

HON 0 1 2 3

PAN 0 1 1 2

ARU 0 0 1 1

DMA 0 0 1 1

== Records ==
The following list is assembled from the following sources.

=== Men ===
Event	Record	Athlete	Nationality	Date	Meet	Place	Ref.
100 m	10.01 A (+1.1 m/s)	Waseem Williams	Jamaica	5 July 2019	2019 Championships	Queretaro, Mexico	
100 m	10.01 A (+1.1 m/s)	Samson Colebrooke	Bahamas	5 July 2019	2019 Championships	Queretaro, Mexico	
100 m	10.01 A (+1.1 m/s)	Mario Burke	Barbados	5 July 2019	2019 Championships	Queretaro, Mexico	
200 m	19.99 (+2.0 m/s)	Curtis Mitchell	United States	9 July 2010	2010 Championships	Miramar, United States	
400 m	44.75 A	LeJerald Betters	United States	21 July 2008	2008 Championships	Toluca, Mexico	
800 m	1:45.65	Charles Jock	United States	11 July 2010	2010 Championships	Miramar, United States	
1500 m	3:44.45	Olivier Collin	Canada	9 July 2010	2010 Championships	Miramar, United States	
5000 m	14:11.48*	Alejandro Suárez	Mexico	5 August 2000	2000 Championships	Monterrey, Mexico	
5000 m	14:11.78	Cole Sprout	United States	21 July 2023	2023 Championships	San José, Costa Rica	
10,000 m	30:16.03	John Moore	United States	8 July 2006	2006 Championships	Santo Domingo, Dominican Republic	
110 m hurdles	13.31 A (+1.8 m/s)	Shane Brathwaite	Barbados	7 July 2012	2012 Championships	Irapuato, Mexico	
400 m hurdles	48.80	Kenneth Ferguson	United States	8 July 2006	2006 Championships	Santo Domingo, Dominican Republic	
3000 m steeplechase	8:47.98*	Tom Chorny	United States	4 August 2000	2000 Championships	Monterrey, Mexico	
3000 m steeplechase	8:52.42	Noé Durado	Mexico	30 July 2004	2004 Championships	Sherbrooke, Canada	
High jump	2.28 m	Ryan Ingraham	Bahamas	10 August 2014	2014 Championships	Kamloops, Canada	
Pole vault	5.61 m	Hunter Garretson	United States	23 July 2023	2023 Championships	San José, Costa Rica	
Long jump	8.25 m A (+0.7 m/s) NR	Andwuelle Wright	Trinidad and Tobago	5 July 2019	2019 Championships	Queretaro, Mexico	
Triple jump	17.01 m (+0.5 m/s)	Osniel Tosca	Cuba	7 July 2006	2006 Championships	Santo Domingo, Dominican Republic	
Shot put	20.81 m A	Jordan Geist	United States	6 July 2019	2019 Championships	Queretaro, Mexico	
Discus throw	63.34 m	Rodney Brown	United States	8 August 2014	2014 Championships	Kamloops, Canada	
Hammer throw	74.55 m	Diego del Real	Mexico	16 July 2016	2016 Championships	San Salvador, El Salvador	
Javelin throw	81.89 m A	Anderson Peters	Grenada	7 July 2019	2019 Championships	Queretaro, Mexico	
Decathlon	7601 pts	Rostam Turner	Canada	16–17 July 2016	2016 Championships	San Salvador, El Salvador	
Decathlon	100m / Long jump / Shot put / High jump / 400m / 110m H / Discus / Pole vault / Javelin / 1500m; 11.08 (−0.4 m/s) / 7.03 m (+1.1 m/s) / 13.11 m / 1.91 m / 48.97 / 15.85 (+0.1 m/s) / 45.40 m / 4.60 m / 57.60 m / 4:43.28						
10,000 m walk (track)	43:55.84	Pedro Alexander López Jayes	Guatemala	10 July 2021	2021 Championships	San José, Costa Rica	
20,000 m walk (track)	1:26:15.32 A	Evan Dunfee	Canada	8 July 2012	2012 Championships	Irapuato, Mexico	
4 × 100 m relay	38.39 A	Jeremy Hall; Teddy Williams; Chris Dykes; J-Mee Samuels	United States	21 July 2008	2008 Championships	Toluca, Mexico	
4 × 400 m relay	2:58.83	LeJerald Betters; O'Neal Wilder; Joey Hughes; Tavaris Tate	United States	11 July 2010	2010 Championships	Miramar, United States	

=== Women ===
Event	Record	Athlete	Nationality	Date	Meet	Place	Ref.
100 m	11.08 (+0.7 m/s)	Mia Brahe-Pedersen	United States	21 July 2023	2023 Championships	San José, Costa Rica	
200 m	22.72 A (+0.9 m/s)	Kimberlyn Duncan	United States	7 July 2012	2012 Championships	Irapuato, Mexico	
400 m	50.68	Jermaisha Arnold	United States	22 July 2023	2023 Championships	San José, Costa Rica	
800 m	2:02.02	Lisneydis Veitia	Cuba	17 July 2016	2016 Championships	San Salvador, El Salvador	
1500 m	4:05.84	Addison Wiley	United States	23 July 2023	2023 Championships	San José, Costa Rica	
5000 m	16:06.26	Erin Finn	United States	10 August 2014	2014 Championships	Kamloops, Canada	
10,000 m	35:30.87	Chelsea Blaase	United States	16 July 2016	2016 Championships	San Salvador, El Salvador	
100 m hurdles	12.57 A (+1.7 m/s)	Tonea Marshall	United States	6 July 2019	2019 Championships	Queretaro, Mexico	
400 m hurdles	55.14	Tierra Brown	United States	11 July 2010	2010 Championships	Miramar, United States	
3000 m steeplechase	9:46.79	Rachel Johnson	United States	10 August 2014	2014 Championships	Kamloops, Canada	
High jump	1.95 m *	Juana Arrendel	Dominican Republic	9 August 2002	2002 Championships	San Antonio, United States	
High jump	1.91 m	Akela Jones	Barbados	15 July 2016	2016 Championships	San Salvador, El Salvador	
Pole vault	4.41 m	Sydney Horn	Canada	21 July 2023	2023 Championships	San José, Costa Rica	
Long jump	6.74 m (−1.0 m/s)	Quanesha Burks	United States	17 July 2016	2016 Championships	San Salvador, El Salvador	
Long jump	6.74 m (−1.6 m/s)	Akela Jones	Barbados	17 July 2016	2016 Championships	San Salvador, El Salvador	
Triple jump	14.28 m	Yarianna Martínez	Cuba	8 July 2006	2006 Championships	Santo Domingo, Dominican Republic	
Shot put	18.49 m	Raven Saunders	United States	16 July 2016	2016 Championships	San Salvador, El Salvador	
Discus throw	60.14 m A	Shanice Love	Jamaica	5 July 2019	2019 Championships	Queretaro, Mexico	
Hammer throw	71.39 m A	Amanda Bingson	United States	6 July 2012	2012 Championships	Irapuato, Mexico	
Javelin throw	57.48 m	Yulenmis Aguilar	Bahamas	23 July 2023	2023 Championships	San José, Costa Rica	
Heptathlon	5810 pts	Gretchen Quintana	Cuba	7–8 July 2006	2006 Championships	Santo Domingo, Dominican Republic	
Heptathlon	100m H / High jump / Shot put / 200m / Long jump / Javelin / 800m; 13.6 h (+1.2 m/s) / 1.71 m / 11.99 m / 24.27 (+0.8 m/s) / 6.10 m (−0.6 m/s) / 33.37 m / 2:16.58						
5000 m walk (track)	22:31.13	Yasury Palacios	Guatemala	10 July 2021	2021 Championships	San José, Costa Rica	
10,000 m walk (track)	49:24.70	Yesenia Miranda	El Salvador	17 July 2016	2016 Championships	San Salvador, El Salvador	
4 × 100 m relay	42.74	Kaila Jackson; Rayniah Jones; Sophia Beckmon; Mia Brahe-Pedersen	United States	22 July 2023	2023 Championships	San José, Costa Rica	
4 × 400 m relay	3:26.83	Ziyah Holman; Kiah Williams; Jan'taijah Ford; Jermaisha Arnold	United States	23 July 2023	2023 Championships	San José, Costa Rica	

=== Mixed ===
Event	Record	Athlete	Nationality	Date	Meet	Place	Ref.
4 × 400 m relay	3:14.71	Caleb Cavanaugh; Kiah Williams; William Sumner; Bailey Lear	United States	21 July 2023	2023 Championships	San José, Costa Rica	

Key:
^{WR} World record	^{AR} North American record	^{NR} National record	^{A} affected by altitude

=== Defunct events ===
Men

Event	Record	Name	Nation	Date	Meet	Place	Ref.
Half marathon	1:08:59*	Hugo Romero	Mexico	5 August 2000	2000 Championships	Monterrey, Mexico	
20 km walk (road)	1:25:37*	Édgar Hernández	Mexico	4 August 2000	2000 Championships	Monterrey, Mexico	
20 km walk (road)	1:31:42	Salvador Mira	El Salvador	July 2006	2006 Championships	Santo Domingo, Dominican Republic	

Women

Event	Record	Name	Nation	Date	Meet	Place	Ref.
Half marathon	1:16:15*	Madai Pérez	Mexico	August 2002	2002 Championships	San Antonio, United States	
10 km walk (road)	50:29	Verónica Colindres	El Salvador	July 2006	2006 Championships	Santo Domingo, Dominican Republic	
20 km walk (road)	1:39:02*	Victoria Palacios	Mexico	4 August 2000	2000 Championships	Monterrey, Mexico	

* Under-25 championship records

== See also ==
- List of North, Central American and Caribbean records in athletics
