= 4 × 400 metres relay at the World Athletics Championships =

Olympic track event

Overview
- Gender: Men, Women and Mixed
- Years held: Men: 1983 – 2025; Women: 1983 – 2025

Championship record
- Men: 2:54.29 United States (1993)
- Women: 3:16.71 United States (1993)

Reigning champion
- Men: Botswana (BOT)
- Women: United States (USA)

The 4 × 400 metres relay at the World Athletics Championships has been contested by both men and women since the inaugural edition in 1983. The competition features three formats in relation to gender: men, women, and mixed. The 2019 edition added in the mixed competition. The format utilizes one set of heats qualifying the top 8 into a final.

The United States holds all the championship records in this event. For both the men and women, the record has been held since 1993 with a time of 2:54.29 for the men and 3:16.71 for the women. In the mixed competition, a time of 3:09.34 was set in 2019. For the men and the mixed records, they are also both world records.

== Age records ==
- All information from World Athletics.

Distinction	Male			Female		
Distinction	Athlete	Age	Date	Athlete	Age	Date
Youngest champion	Mark Richardson (GBR)	19 years, 37 days	1 Sep 1991	Sanya Richards (USA)	18 years, 186 days	31 Aug 2003
Youngest medalist	Kunle Adejuyigbe (NGR)	18 years, 5 days	13 Aug 1995	Sanya Richards (USA)	18 years, 186 days	31 Aug 2003
Youngest finalist	Renny Quow (TTO)	17 years, 354 days	14 Aug 2005	Doris Jacob (NGR)	15 years, 237 days	10 Aug 1997
Youngest participant	Masoud Al-Rahman (QAT)	16 years, 354 days	31 Aug 1991	Doris Jacob (NGR)	15 years, 236 days	9 Aug 1997
Oldest champion	Timothy Munnings (BAH)	35 years, 51 days	12 Aug 2001	Jearl Miles Clark (USA)	36 years, 361 days	31 Aug 2003
Oldest medalist	Timothy Munnings (BAH)	35 years, 51 days	12 Aug 2001	Jearl Miles Clark (USA)	36 years, 361 days	31 Aug 2003
Oldest finalist	Isaac Makwala (BOT)	35 years, 298 days	24 Jul 2022	Jearl Miles Clark (USA)	36 years, 361 days	31 Aug 2003
Oldest participant	Isaac Makwala (BOT)	35 years, 298 days	24 Jul 2022	Christine Amertil (BAH)	37 years, 359 days	12 Aug 2017

=== Mixed 4 × 400 relay ===
Distinction	Male			Female		
Distinction	Athlete	Age	Date	Athlete	Age	Date
Youngest champion	Wil London (USA)	22 years, 43 days	29 Sep 2019	Fiordaliza Cofil (DOM)	21 years, 261 days	15 Jul 2022
Youngest medalist	Moussa Ali Issa (BHR)	19 years, 34 days	29 Sep 2019	Salwa Eid Naser (BHR)	21 years, 129 days	29 Sep 2019
Youngest finalist	Moussa Ali Issa (BHR)	19 years, 34 days	29 Sep 2019	Imeobong Nse Uko (NGR)	18 years, 145 days	15 Jul 2022
Youngest participant	Moussa Ali Issa (BHR)	19 years, 33 days	28 Sep 2019	Saki Takashima (JPN)	17 years, 222 days	28 Sep 2019
Oldest champion	Michael Cherry (USA)	24 years, 190 days	29 Sep 2019	Allyson Felix (USA)	33 years, 239 days	29 Sep 2019
Oldest medalist	Javon Francis (JAM)	24 years, 289 days	29 Sep 2019	Allyson Felix (USA)	36 years, 315 days	15 Jul 2022
Oldest finalist	Rabah Yousif (GBR)	32 years, 292 days	29 Sep 2019	Geisa Coutinho (BRA)	39 years, 120 days	29 Sep 2019
Oldest participant	Rabah Yousif (GBR)	32 years, 292 days	29 Sep 2019	Geisa Coutinho (BRA)	39 years, 120 days	29 Sep 2019

== Medalists ==
=== Men ===
Championships	Gold	Silver	Bronze
1983 Helsinki	Soviet Union (URS); Sergey Lovachov; Aliaksandr Trashchyla; Nikolay Chernetskiy; Viktor Markin	West Germany (FRG); Erwin Skamrahl; Jörg Vaihinger; Harald Schmid; Hartmut Weber; Martin Weppler*; Edgar Nakladal*	Great Britain (GBR); Ainsley Bennett; Garry Cook; Todd Bennett; Phil Brown; Kriss Akabusi*
1987 Rome	United States (USA); Danny Everett; Roddie Haley; Antonio McKay; Butch Reynolds; Michael Franks*; Raymond Pierre*	Great Britain (GBR); Derek Redmond; Kriss Akabusi; Roger Black; Phil Brown; Todd Bennett*; Mark Thomas*	Cuba (CUB); Leandro Peñalver; Agustín Pavó; Lázaro Martínez; Roberto Hernández
1991 Tokyo	Great Britain (GBR); Roger Black; Derek Redmond; John Regis; Kriss Akabusi; Ade Mafe*; Mark Richardson*	United States (USA); Andrew Valmon; Quincy Watts; Danny Everett; Antonio Pettigrew; Jeff Reynolds*; Mark Everett*	Jamaica (JAM); Patrick O'Connor; Devon Morris; Winthrop Graham; Seymour Fagan; Howard Burnett*
1993 Stuttgart	United States (USA); Andrew Valmon; Quincy Watts; Butch Reynolds; Michael Johnson; Antonio Pettigrew*; Derek Mills*	Kenya (KEN); Kennedy Ochieng; Simon Kemboi; Abednego Matilu; Samson Kitur	Germany (GER); Rico Lieder; Karsten Just; Olaf Hense; Thomas Schönlebe
1995 Gothenburg	United States (USA); Marlon Ramsey; Derek Mills; Butch Reynolds; Michael Johnson; Kevin Lyles*; Darnell Hall*	Jamaica (JAM); Michael McDonald; Davian Clarke; Danny McFarlane; Greg Haughton; Dennis Blake*	Nigeria (NGR); Udeme Ekpeyong; Kunle Adejuyigbe; Jude Monye; Sunday Bada
1997 Athens^{dq1}	Great Britain (GBR); Iwan Thomas; Roger Black; Jamie Baulch; Mark Richardson; Mark Hylton*	Jamaica (JAM); Michael McDonald; Greg Haughton; Danny McFarlane; Davian Clarke; Linval Laird*	Poland (POL); Tomasz Czubak; Piotr Rysiukiewicz; Piotr Haczek; Robert Maćkowiak
1999 Seville^{dq2}	Poland (POL); Tomasz Czubak; Robert Maćkowiak; Jacek Bocian; Piotr Haczek; Piotr Długosielski*	Jamaica (JAM); Michael McDonald; Greg Haughton; Danny McFarlane; Davian Clarke; Paston Coke*; Omar A. Brown*	South Africa (RSA); Jopie van Oudtshoorn; Hendrick Mokganyetsi; Adriaan Botha; Arnaud Malherbe
2001 Edmonton^{dq3}	Bahamas (BAH); Avard Moncur; Chris Brown; Troy McIntosh; Timothy Munnings; Carl Oliver*	Jamaica (JAM); Brandon Simpson; Christopher Williams; Greg Haughton; Danny McFarlane; Michael Blackwood*; Mario Watts*	Poland (POL); Rafał Wieruszewski; Piotr Haczek; Piotr Długosielski; Piotr Rysiukiewicz; Jacek Bocian*
2003 Saint-Denis^{dq4}	France (FRA); Leslie Djhone; Naman Keïta; Stéphane Diagana; Marc Raquil; Ahmed Douhou*	Jamaica (JAM); Brandon Simpson; Danny McFarlane; Davian Clarke; Michael Blackwood; Michael Campbell*; Lansford Spence*	Bahamas (BAH); Avard Moncur; Dennis Darling; Nathaniel McKinney; Chris Brown; Carl Oliver*
2005 Helsinki	United States (USA); Andrew Rock; Derrick Brew; Darold Williamson; Jeremy Wariner; Miles Smith*; LaShawn Merritt*	Bahamas (BAH); Nathaniel McKinney; Avard Moncur; Andrae Williams; Chris Brown; Troy McIntosh*	Jamaica (JAM); Sanjay Ayre; Brandon Simpson; Lansford Spence; Davian Clarke; Michael Blackwood*
2007 Osaka	United States (USA); LaShawn Merritt; Angelo Taylor; Darold Williamson; Jeremy Wariner; Bershawn Jackson*; Kerron Clement*	Bahamas (BAH); Avard Moncur; Michael Mathieu; Andrae Williams; Chris Brown; Nathaniel McKinney*	Poland (POL); Marek Plawgo; Daniel Dąbrowski; Marcin Marciniszyn; Kacper Kozłowski; Rafał Wieruszewski*; Witold Bańka*
2009 Berlin	United States (USA); Angelo Taylor; Jeremy Wariner; Kerron Clement; LaShawn Merritt; Lionel Larry*; Bershawn Jackson*	Great Britain (GBR); Conrad Williams; Michael Bingham; Robert Tobin; Martyn Rooney; Dai Greene*	Australia (AUS); John Steffensen; Ben Offereins; Tristan Thomas; Sean Wroe; Joel Milburn*
2011 Daegu	United States (USA); Greg Nixon; Bershawn Jackson; Angelo Taylor; LaShawn Merritt; Jamaal Torrance*; Michael Berry*	South Africa (RSA); Shane Victor; Ofentse Mogawane; Willem de Beer; L. J. van Zyl; Oscar Pistorius*	Jamaica (JAM); Allodin Fothergill; Jermaine Gonzales; Riker Hylton; Leford Green; Lansford Spence*
2013 Moscow^{dq5}	United States (USA); David Verburg; Tony McQuay; Arman Hall; LaShawn Merritt; James Harris*; Joshua Mance*	Jamaica (JAM); Rusheen McDonald; Edino Steele; Omar Johnson; Javon Francis; Javere Bell*	Great Britain (GBR); Conrad Williams; Martyn Rooney; Michael Bingham; Nigel Levine; Jamie Bowie*
2015 Beijing	United States (USA); David Verburg; Tony McQuay; Bryshon Nellum; LaShawn Merritt; Kyle Clemons*; Vernon Norwood*	Trinidad and Tobago (TRI); Renny Quow; Lalonde Gordon; Deon Lendore; Machel Cedenio; Jarrin Solomon*	Great Britain (GBR); Rabah Yousif; Delano Williams; Jarryd Dunn; Martyn Rooney
2017 London	Trinidad and Tobago (TRI); Jarrin Solomon; Jereem Richards; Machel Cedenio; Lalonde Gordon; Renny Quow*	United States (USA); Wil London; Gil Roberts; Michael Cherry; Fred Kerley; Bryshon Nellum*; Tony McQuay*	Great Britain (GBR); Matthew Hudson-Smith; Rabah Yousif; Dwayne Cowan; Martyn Rooney; Jack Green*
2019 Doha	United States (USA); Fred Kerley; Michael Cherry; Wil London; Rai Benjamin; Tyrell Richard*; Vernon Norwood*; Nathan Strother*	Jamaica (JAM); Akeem Bloomfield; Nathon Allen; Terry Thomas; Demish Gaye; Javon Francis*	Belgium (BEL); Jonathan Sacoor; Robin Vanderbemden; Dylan Borlée; Kevin Borlée; Julien Watrin*
2022 Eugene	United States (USA); Elija Godwin; Michael Norman; Bryce Deadmon; Champion Allison; Trevor Bassitt*; Vernon Norwood*	Jamaica (JAM); Akeem Bloomfield; Nathon Allen; Jevaughn Powell; Christopher Taylor; Karayme Bartley*; Anthony Cox*	Belgium (BEL); Dylan Borlée; Julien Watrin; Alexander Doom; Kevin Borlée; Jonathan Sacoor*
2023 Budapest	United States (USA); Quincy Hall; Vernon Norwood; Justin Robinson; Rai Benjamin; Trevor Bassitt*; Matthew Boling*; Christopher Bailey*	France (FRA); Ludvy Vaillant; Gilles Biron; David Sombé; Téo Andant; Loïc Prévot*	Great Britain (GBR); Alex Haydock-Wilson; Charlie Dobson; Lewis Davey; Rio Mitcham
2025 Tokyo	Botswana (BOT); Lee Bhekempilo Eppie; Letsile Tebogo; Bayapo Ndori; Busang Collen Kebinatshipi; Leungo Scotch*	United States (USA); Vernon Norwood; Jacory Patterson; Khaleb McRae; Rai Benjamin; Christopher Bailey*; Demarius Smith*; Bryce Deadmon*; Jenoah McKiver*	South Africa (RSA); Lythe Pillay; Udeme Okon; Wayde van Niekerk; Zakithi Nene; Gardeo Isaacs*; Leendert Koekemoer*

Note: * Indicates athletes who ran only in the preliminary round and also received medals.

- ^{dq1} The United States team (Jerome Young, Antonio Pettigrew, Chris Jones and Tyree Washington) originally won the 1997 World Championships in a time of 2:56.47 minutes, but was disqualified in 2009 after Pettigrew admitted to doping during the period.
- ^{dq2} The United States team (Jerome Davis, Antonio Pettigrew, Angelo Taylor and Michael Johnson) originally won the 1999 World Championships, but was disqualified in 2009 after Pettigrew admitted to doping during the period.
- ^{dq3} The United States team (Leonard Byrd, Antonio Pettigrew, Derrick Brew and Angelo Taylor) originally won the 2001 World Championships, but was disqualified in 2009 after Pettigrew admitted to doping during the period.
- ^{dq4} The United States team (Calvin Harrison, Tyree Washington, Derrick Brew and Jerome Young) originally won the 2003 World Championships, but was disqualified in 2004 after Harrison and Young were found to have used performance-enhancing drugs.
- ^{dq5} The Russian team (Maksim Dyldin, Lev Mosin, Sergey Petukhov and Vladimir Krasnov) originally finished third in the 2013 World Championships, but was disqualified after Dyldin was found to have used performance-enhancing drugs.

==== Medalists by country ====
Rank	Nation	Gold	Silver	Bronze	Total
1	United States	12	3	0	15
2	Great Britain	2	2	5	9
3	Bahamas	1	2	1	4
4	France	1	1	0	2
4	Trinidad and Tobago	1	1	0	2
6	Poland	1	0	3	4
7	Soviet Union	1	0	0	1
7	Botswana	1	0	0	1
9	Jamaica	0	8	3	11
10	South Africa	0	1	2	3
11	Germany	0	1	1	2
12	Belgium	0	0	2	2
13	Australia	0	0	1	1

=== Women ===
Championships	Gold	Silver	Bronze
1983 Helsinki	East Germany (GDR); Kerstin Walther; Sabine Busch; Marita Koch; Dagmar Rübsam; Undine Bremer*; Ellen Fiedler*	Czechoslovakia (TCH); Taťána Kocembová; Milena Matějkovičová; Zuzana Moravčíková; Jarmila Kratochvílová	Soviet Union (URS); Yelena Korban; Marina Ivanova; Irina Baskakova; Mariya Pinigina
1987 Rome	East Germany (GDR); Dagmar Neubauer; Kirsten Emmelmann; Petra Müller; Sabine Busch; Cornelia Ullrich*	Soviet Union (URS); Aelita Yurchenko; Olga Nazarova; Mariya Pinigina; Olga Bryzgina	United States (USA); Diane Dixon; Denean Howard; Valerie Brisco; Lillie Leatherwood
1991 Tokyo	Soviet Union (URS); Tatyana Ledovskaya; Lyudmyla Dzhyhalova; Olga Nazarova; Olga Bryzgina; Anna Chuprina*	United States (USA); Rochelle Stevens; Diane Dixon; Jearl Miles; Lillie Leatherwood; Natasha Kaiser-Brown*	Germany (GER); Uta Rohländer; Katrin Krabbe; Christine Wachtel; Grit Breuer; Annett Hesselbarth*; Katrin Schreiter*
1993 Stuttgart	United States (USA); Gwen Torrence; Maicel Malone-Wallace; Natasha Kaiser; Jearl Miles; Terri Dendy*; Michelle Collins*	Russia (RUS); Yelena Rouzina; Tatyana Alekseyeva; Margarita Ponomaryova; Irina Privalova; Yelena Golesheva*; Vera Sychugova*	Great Britain (GBR); Linda Keough; Phylis Smith; Tracy Goddard; Sally Gunnell
1995 Gothenburg	United States (USA); Kim Graham; Rochelle Stevens; Camara Jones; Jearl Miles; Nicole Green*	Russia (RUS); Tatyana Chebykina; Svetlana Goncharenko; Yuliya Sotnikova; Yelena Andreyeva; Tatyana Zakharova*	Australia (AUS); Lee Naylor; Renée Poetschka; Melinda Gainsford; Cathy Freeman
1997 Athens	Germany (GER); Anke Feller; Uta Rohländer; Anja Rücker; Grit Breuer	United States (USA); Maicel Malone; Kim Graham; Kim Batten; Jearl Miles Clark; Michelle Collins*; Natasha Kaiser-Brown*	Jamaica (JAM); Inez Turner; Lorraine Graham; Deon Hemmings; Sandie Richards; Nadia Graham-Hutchinson*
1999 Seville	Russia (RUS); Tatyana Chebykina; Svetlana Goncharenko; Olga Kotlyarova; Natalya Nazarova; Natalya Sharova*; Yekaterina Bakhvalova*	United States (USA); Suziann Reid; Maicel Malone-Wallace; Michelle Collins; Jearl Miles Clark; Andrea Anderson*	Germany (GER); Anke Feller; Uta Rohländer; Anja Rücker; Grit Breuer; Anja Knippel*
2001 Edmonton	Jamaica (JAM); Sandie Richards; Catherine Scott-Pomales; Debbie-Ann Parris; Lorraine Fenton; Michelle Burgher*; Deon Hemmings*	Germany (GER); Florence Ekpo-Umoh; Shanta Ghosh; Claudia Marx; Grit Breuer	Russia (RUS); Irina Rosikhina; Yuliya Pechonkina; Anastasiya Kapachinskaya; Olesya Zykina; Natalya Shevtsova*
2003 Saint-Denis	United States (USA); Demetria Washington; Jearl Miles Clark; Me'Lisa Barber; Sanya Richards; DeeDee Trotter*	Russia (RUS); Anastasiya Kapachinskaya; Natalya Nazarova; Olesya Zykina; Yuliya Pechonkina (Nosova); Svetlana Goncharenko*; Svetlana Pospelova*	Jamaica (JAM); Allison Beckford; Lorraine Fenton (Graham); Ronetta Smith; Sandie Richards; Michelle Burgher*
2005 Helsinki	Russia (RUS); Yuliya Pechonkina; Olesya Krasnomovets; Natalya Antyukh; Svetlana Pospelova; Tatyana Firova*; Olesya Zykina*	Jamaica (JAM); Shericka Williams; Novlene Williams; Ronetta Smith; Lorraine Fenton	Great Britain (GBR); Lee McConnell; Donna Fraser; Nicola Sanders; Christine Ohuruogu
2007 Osaka	United States (USA); DeeDee Trotter; Allyson Felix; Mary Wineberg; Sanya Richards; Monique Hennagan*; Natasha Hastings*	Jamaica (JAM); Shericka Williams; Shereefa Lloyd; Davita Prendagast; Novlene Williams; Anastasia Le-Roy*	Great Britain (GBR); Christine Ohuruogu; Marilyn Okoro; Lee McConnell; Nicola Sanders; Donna Fraser*
2009 Berlin^{dq1}	United States (USA); Debbie Dunn; Allyson Felix; Lashinda Demus; Sanya Richards; Natasha Hastings*; Jessica Beard*	Jamaica (JAM); Rosemarie Whyte; Novlene Williams-Mills; Shereefa Lloyd; Shericka Williams; Kaliese Spencer*	Great Britain (GBR); Lee McConnell; Christine Ohuruogu; Vicki Barr; Nicola Sanders; Jenny Meadows*
2011 Daegu^{dq2}	United States (USA); Sanya Richards-Ross; Allyson Felix; Jessica Beard; Francena McCorory; Natasha Hastings*; Keshia Baker*	Jamaica (JAM); Rosemarie Whyte; Davita Prendergast; Novlene Williams-Mills; Shericka Williams; Shereefa Lloyd*; Patricia Hall*	Great Britain (GBR); Perri Shakes-Drayton; Nicola Sanders; Christine Ohuruogu; Lee McConnell
2013 Moscow^{dq3}	United States (USA); Jessica Beard; Natasha Hastings; Ashley Spencer; Francena McCorory; Joanna Atkins*	Great Britain (GBR); Eilidh Child; Shana Cox; Margaret Adeoye; Christine Ohuruogu	France (FRA); Marie Gayot; Lénora Guion-Firmin; Muriel Hurtis-Houairi; Floria Guei; Phara Anacharsis*
2015 Beijing	Jamaica (JAM); Christine Day; Shericka Jackson; Stephenie Ann McPherson; Novlene Williams-Mills; Anastasia Le-Roy*; Chrisann Gordon*	United States (USA); Sanya Richards-Ross; Natasha Hastings; Allyson Felix; Francena McCorory; Phyllis Francis*; Jessica Beard*	Great Britain (GBR); Christine Ohuruogu; Anyika Onuora; Eilidh Child; Seren Bundy-Davies; Kirsten McAslan*
2017 London	United States (USA); Quanera Hayes; Allyson Felix; Shakima Wimbley; Phyllis Francis; Kendall Ellis*; Natasha Hastings*	Great Britain (GBR); Zoey Clark; Laviai Nielsen; Eilidh Doyle; Emily Diamond; Perri Shakes-Drayton*	Poland (POL); Małgorzata Hołub; Iga Baumgart; Aleksandra Gaworska; Justyna Święty; Patrycja Wyciszkiewicz*; Martyna Dąbrowska*
2019 Doha	United States (USA); Phyllis Francis; Sydney McLaughlin; Dalilah Muhammad; Wadeline Jonathas; Jessica Beard*; Allyson Felix*; Kendall Ellis*; Courtney Okolo*	Poland (POL); Iga Baumgart-Witan; Patrycja Wyciszkiewicz; Małgorzata Hołub-Kowalik; Justyna Święty-Ersetic; Anna Kiełbasińska*	Jamaica (JAM); Anastasia Le-Roy; Tiffany James; Stephenie Ann McPherson; Shericka Jackson; Roneisha McGregor*
2022 Eugene	United States (USA); Talitha Diggs; Abby Steiner; Britton Wilson; Sydney McLaughlin; Kaylin Whitney*; Allyson Felix*; Jaide Stepter Baynes*	Jamaica (JAM); Candice McLeod; Janieve Russell; Stephenie Ann McPherson; Charokee Young; Stacey Ann Williams*; Junelle Bromfield*; Tiffany James*	Great Britain (GBR); Victoria Ohuruogu; Nicole Yeargin; Jessie Knight; Laviai Nielsen; Ama Pipi*
2023 Budapest	Netherlands (NED); Eveline Saalberg; Lieke Klaver; Cathelijn Peeters; Femke Bol; Lisanne de Witte*	Jamaica (JAM); Candice McLeod; Janieve Russell; Nickisha Pryce; Stacey-Ann Williams; Charokee Young*; Shiann Salmon*	Great Britain (GBR); Laviai Nielsen; Amber Anning; Ama Pipi; Nicole Yeargin; Yemi Mary John*
2025 Tokyo	United States (USA); Isabella Whittaker; Lynna Irby-Jackson; Aaliyah Butler; Sydney McLaughlin-Levrone; Alexis Holmes*; Rosey Effiong*; Quanera Hayes*; Britton Wilson*	Jamaica (JAM); Dejanea Oakley; Stacey Ann Williams; Andrenette Knight; Nickisha Pryce; Roneisha McGregor*	Netherlands (NED); Eveline Saalberg; Lieke Klaver; Lisanne de Witte; Femke Bol; Myrte van der Schoot*

Note: * Indicates athletes who ran only in the preliminary round and also received medals.

- ^{dq1} The Russian team (Anastasiya Kapachinskaya, Tatyana Firova, Lyudmila Litvinova and Antonina Krivoshapka) originally finished third in the 2009 World Championships, but was disqualified after Kapachinskaya was found to have used performance-enhancing drugs.
- ^{dq2} The Russian team (Antonina Krivoshapka, Natalya Antyukh, Lyudmila Litvinova and Anastasiya Kapachinskaya) originally finished third in the 2011 World Championships, but was disqualified after Kapachinskaya was found to have used performance-enhancing drugs.
- ^{dq3} The Russian team (Yuliya Gushchina, Tatyana Firova, Kseniya Ryzhova and Antonina Krivoshapka) originally won in the 2013 World Championships, but was disqualified after Krivoshapka was found to have used performance-enhancing drugs.

==== Medalists by country ====
Rank	Nation	Gold	Silver	Bronze	Total
1	United States	11	5	1	17
2	Russia	3	3	3	9
3	Jamaica	2	7	2	11
4	East Germany	2	0	0	2
5	Germany	1	1	2	4
6	Soviet Union	1	1	1	3
7	Netherlands	1	0	1	2
8	Great Britain	0	2	8	10
9	Poland	0	1	1	2
10	Czechoslovakia	0	1	0	1
11	Australia	0	0	1	1
11	France	0	0	1	1

=== Mixed ===
Championships	Gold	Silver	Bronze
2019 Doha	United States (USA); Wilbert London; Allyson Felix; Courtney Okolo; Michael Cherry; Tyrell Richard*; Jessica Beard*; Jasmine Blocker*; Obi Igbokwe*	Jamaica (JAM); Nathon Allen; Roneisha McGregor; Tiffany James; Javon Francis; Janieve Russell*	Bahrain (BHR); Musa Isah; Aminat Jamal; Salwa Eid Naser; Abbas Abubakar Abbas
2022 Eugene	Dominican Republic (DOM); Fiordaliza Cofil; Lidio Andrés Feliz; Alexander Ogando; Marileidy Paulino	Netherlands (NED); Femke Bol; Liemarvin Bonevacia; Tony van Diepen; Lieke Klaver; Eveline Saalberg*	United States (USA); Allyson Felix; Elija Godwin; Vernon Norwood; Kennedy Simon; Wadeline Jonathas*
2023 Budapest	United States (USA); Justin Robinson; Rosey Effiong; Matthew Boling; Alexis Holmes; Ryan Willie*	Great Britain (GBR); Lewis Davey; Laviai Nielsen; Rio Mitcham; Yemi Mary John; Joseph Brier*	Czech Republic (CZE); Matěj Krsek; Tereza Petržilková; Patrik Šorm; Lada Vondrová
2025 Tokyo	United States (USA); Bryce Deadmon; Lynna Irby-Jackson; Jenoah McKiver; Alexis Holmes	Netherlands (NED); Eugene Omalla; Lieke Klaver; Jonas Phijffers; Femke Bol; Eveline Saalberg*	Belgium (BEL); Dylan Borlée; Imke Vervaet; Alexander Doom; Helena Ponette; Jonathan Sacoor*

Note: * Indicates athletes who ran only in the preliminary round and also received medals.

==== Medalists by country ====
Rank	Nation	Gold	Silver	Bronze	Total
1	United States	3	0	1	4
2	Dominican Republic	1	0	0	1
3	Netherlands	0	2	0	2
4	United Kingdom	0	1	0	1
4	Jamaica	0	1	0	1
6	Bahrain	0	0	1	1
6	Belgium	0	0	1	1
6	Czech Republic	0	0	1	1

== Championship record progression ==
=== Men ===
Men's 4 × 400 metres relay World Championships record progression
Time	Nation	Location	Round	Date	Athletes
3.06.62	United States	Helsinki	Heat 1	Aug 13, 1983	Alonzo Babers, Willie Smith, Andre Phillips, Michael Franks
3.02.13	United States	Helsinki	Semifinals	Aug 13, 1983	Alonzo Babers, Sunder Nix, Willie Smith, Edwin Moses
3.00.79	Soviet Union	Helsinki	Final	Aug 14, 1983	Sergey Lovachov, Aleksandr Troshchilo, Nikolay Chernetskiy, Viktor Markin
2.59.06	United States	Rome	Heat 2	Sep 05, 1987	Danny Everett, Michael Franks, Raymond Pierre, Antonio McKay
2.57.29	United States	Rome	Final	Sep 06, 1987	Danny Everett, Roddie Haley, Antonio McKay, Butch Reynolds
2.54.29	United States	Stuttgart	Final	Aug 22, 1993	Andrew Valmon, Quincy Watts, Butch Reynolds, Michael Johnson

=== Women ===
Women's 4 × 400 metres relay World Championships record progression
Time	Nation	Location	Round	Date	Athletes
3.26.82	United States	Helsinki	Heats	Aug 13, 1983	Roberta Belle, Easter Gabriel, Rosalyn Bryant, Denean Howard
3:19.73	East Germany	Helsinki	Finwal	Aug 14, 1983	Kerstin Walther, Sabine Busch, Marita Koch, Dagmar Rübsam
3:18.63	East Germany	Rome	Final	Sep 6, 1987	Dagmar Neubauer, Kirsten Emmelmann, Petra Muller, Sabine Busch
3:18.43	Soviet Union	Tokyo	Final	Sep 1, 1991	Tatyana Ledovskaya, Lyudmila Dzhigalova, Olga Nazarova, Olha Bryzhina
3:16.71	United States	Stuttgart	Final	Aug 22, 1993	Gwen Torrence, Maicel Malone, Natasha Kaiser-Brown, Jearl Miles
3:16.61	United States	Tokyo	Final	21 Sep, 2025	Isabella Whittaker, Lynna Irby-Jackson, Aaliyah Butler, Sydney McLaughlin-Levrone

=== Mixed ===
Mixed 4 × 400 metres relay World Championships record progression
Time	Nation	Location	Round	Date	Athletes
3:12.42	United States	Doha	Heats	28 Sep, 2019	Tyrell Richard, Jessica Beard, Jasmine Blocker, Obi Igbokwe
3:09.34	United States	Doha	Final	29 Sep, 2019	Wilbert London, Allyson Felix, Courtney Okolo, Michael Cherry
3:08.80	United States	Budapest	Final	19 Aug 2023	Justin Robinson, Rosey Effiong, Matthew Boling, Alexis Holmes
3:08.80	United States	Tokyo	Final	13 Sep 2025	Bryce Deadmon, Lynna Irby-Jackson, Jenoah McKiver, Alexis Holmes

== Finishing times ==
=== Top ten fastest World Championship times ===
Fastest men's times at the World Championships
Rank	Time (sec)	Nation	Athletes	Games	Round	Date
1	2:54.29	United States (USA)	Andrew Valmon, Quincy Watts, Harry Reynolds, Michael Johnson	1993	Final	22 August
2	2:55.56	United States (USA)	LaShawn Merritt, Angelo Taylor, Darold Williamson, Jeremy Wariner	2007	Final	2 September
3	2:56.17	United States (USA)	Elija Godwin, Michael Norman, Bryce Deadmon, Champion Allison	2022	Final	24 July
4	2:56.65	Great Britain (GBR)	Iwan Thomas, Roger Black, Jamie Baulch, Mark Richardson	1997	Final	10 August
5	2:56.69	United States (USA)	Fred Kerley, Michael Cherry, Wilbert London, Rai Benjamin	2019	Final	6 October
6	2:56.75	Jamaica (JAM)	Michael McDonald, Gregory Haughton, Danny McFarlane, Davian Clarke	1997	Final	14 August
7	2:56.91	United States (USA)	Andrew Rock, Derrick Brew, Darold Williamson, Jeremy Wariner	2005	Final	5 October
8	2:57.29	United States (USA)	Danny Everett, Roddie Haley, Dennis Mitchell, Leroy Burrell	1987	Final	6 September
9	2:57.31	United States (USA)	Quincy Hall, Vernon Norwood, Justin Robinson, Rai Benjamin	2023	Final	27 August
10	2:57.32	United States (USA)	Marlon Ramsey, Derek Mills, Harry Reynolds, Michael Johnson	1995	Final	13 August

Fastest women's times at the World Championships
Rank	Time (sec)	Nation	Athletes	Games	Round	Date
1	3:16.61	United States (USA)	Isabella Whittaker, Lynna Irby-Jackson, Aaliyah Butler, Sydney McLaughlin-Levrone	2025	Final	21 September
2	3:16.71	United States (USA)	Gwen Torrence, Maicel Malone, Natasha Kaiser-Brown, Jearl Miles Clark	1993	Final	22 August
3	3:17.79	United States (USA)	Talitha Diggs, Abby Steiner, Britton Wilson, Sydney McLaughlin	2022	Final	24 July
4	3:17.83	United States (USA)	Debbie Dunn, Allyson Felix, Lashinda Demus, Sanya Richards	2009	Final	23 August
5	3:18.09	United States (USA)	Sanya Richards-Ross, Allyson Felix, Jessica Beard, Francena McCorory	2011	Final	3 September
6	3:18.38	Russia (RUS)	Yelena Ruzina, Tatyana Alekseyeva, Margarita Ponomaryova, Irina Privalova	1993	Final	22 August
7	3:18.43	Soviet Union (USSR)	Tatyana Ledovskaya, Lyudmila Dzhigalova, Olga Nazarova, Olga Bryzgina	1991	Final	1 September
8	3:18.55	United States (USA)	Dee Dee Trotter, Allyson Felix, Mary Wineberg, Sanya Richards	2007	Final	2 September
9	3:18.63	East Germany (GDR)	Dagmar Neubauer, Kirsten Emmelmann, Petra Schersing, Sabine Busch	1987	Final	6 September
10	3:18.71	Jamaica (JAM)	Rosemarie Whyte, Davita Prendergast, Novlene Williams-Mills, Shericka Williams	2011	Final	3 September

Fastest mixed times at the World Championships
Rank	Time (sec)	Nation	Athletes	Games	Round	Date
1	3:08.80	United States (USA)	Justin Robinson, Rosey Effiong, Matthew Boling, Alexis Holmes	2023	Final	19 August
1	3:08.80	United States (USA)	Bryce Deadmon, Lynna Irby-Jackson, Jenoah McKiver, Alexis Holmes	2025	Final	13 September
3	3:09.34	United States (USA)	Wilbert London, Allyson Felix, Courtney Okolo, Michael Cherry	2019	Final	29 September
4	3:09.82	Dominican Republic (DOM)	Lidio Andrés Feliz, Marileidy Paulino, Alexander Ogando, Fiordaliza Cofil	2022	Final	15 July
5	3:09.90	Netherlands (NED)	Liemarvin Bonevacia, Lieke Klaver, Tony van Diepen, Femke Bol	2022	Final	15 July
6	3:09.96	Netherlands (NED)	Eugene Omalla, Lieke Klaver, Jonas Phijffers, Femke Bol	2025	Final	13 September
7	3:10.16	United States (USA)	Elija Godwin, Allyson Felix, Vernon Norwood, Kennedy Simon	2022	Final	15 July
8	3:10.18	United States (USA)	Bryce Deadmon, Lynna Irby-Jackson, Jenoah McKiver, Alexis Holmes	2025	Heats	13 September
9	3:10.22	Great Britain (GBR)	Lewis Davey, Nicole Yeargin, Toby Harries, Yemi Mary John	2025	Heats	13 September
10	3:10.37	Belgium (BEL)	Jonathan Sacoor, Imke Vervaet, Dylan Borlée, Helena Ponette	2025	Heats	13 September
