= United States at the 2019 World Athletics Championships =

- Flag of the United States
- WA code: USA
- National federation: USA Track & Field
- Website: usatf.org

in Doha, Qatar September 27 – October 6, 2019
- Competitors: 144 (71 men and 73 women) in 46 events
- Medals Ranked 1st: Gold 14 Silver 11 Bronze 4 Total 29

World Athletics Championships appearances (overview)
- 1976; 1980; 1983; 1987; 1991; 1993; 1995; 1997; 1999; 2001; 2003; 2005; 2007; 2009; 2011; 2013; 2015; 2017; 2019; 2022; 2023

The United States competed at the 2019 World Athletics Championships in Doha, Qatar, from 27 September–6 October 2019. The selection meet for these championships was the 2019 USA Outdoor Track and Field Championships.

== Medalists ==
Medal	Athlete	Event
Gold	Christian Coleman	Men's 100 metres
Gold	Noah Lyles	Men's 200 metres
Gold	Donavan Brazier	Men's 800 metres
Gold	Grant Holloway	Men's 110 metres hurdles
Gold	Christian Coleman; Justin Gatlin; Mike Rodgers; Noah Lyles; Cravon Gillespie*	Men's 4 × 100 metres relay
Gold	Fred Kerley; Michael Cherry; Wil London; Rai Benjamin; Tyrell Richard*; Vernon Norwood*; Nathan Strother*	Men's 4 × 400 metres relay
Gold	Sam Kendricks	Men's pole vault
Gold	Christian Taylor	Men's triple jump
Gold	Joe Kovacs	Men's shot put
Gold	Nia Ali	Women's 100 metres hurdles
Gold	Dalilah Muhammad	Women's 400 metres hurdles
Gold	Phyllis Francis; Sydney McLaughlin; Dalilah Muhammad; Wadeline Jonathas; Jessica Beard*; Allyson Felix*; Kendall Ellis*; Courtney Okolo*	Women's 4 × 400 metres relay
Gold	DeAnna Price	Women's hammer throw
Gold	Wil London; Allyson Felix; Courtney Okolo; Michael Cherry; Tyrell Richard*; Jessica Beard*; Jasmine Blocker*; Obi Igbokwe*	Mixed 4 × 400 metres relay
Silver	Justin Gatlin	Men's 100 metres
Silver	Rai Benjamin	Men's 400 metres hurdles
Silver	Jeff Henderson	Men's long jump
Silver	Will Claye	Men's triple jump
Silver	Ryan Crouser	Men's shot put
Silver	Brittany Brown	Women's 200 metres
Silver	Raevyn Rogers	Women's 800 metres
Silver	Kendra Harrison	Women's 100 metres hurdles
Silver	Sydney McLaughlin	Women's 400 metres hurdles
Silver	Emma Coburn	Women's 3000 metres steeplechase
Silver	Sandi Morris	Women's pole vault
Bronze	Fred Kerley	Men's 400 metres
Bronze	Ajeé Wilson	Women's 800 metres
Bronze	Dezerea Bryant; Teahna Daniels; Morolake Akinosun; Kiara Parker	Women's 4 × 100 metres relay
Bronze	Vashti Cunningham	Women's high jump

* – Indicates the athlete competed in preliminaries but not the final

== Results ==
=== Men ===
Track and road events

Athlete	Event	Heat		Semifinal		Final	
Athlete	Event	Result	Rank	Result	Rank	Result	Rank
Christopher Belcher	100 metres	10.23 (-0.3)	25	Did not advance			
Christian Coleman	100 metres	9.98 (+0.1)	1 Q	9.88 (-0.3)	1 Q	9.76 (+0.6)	1st place, gold medalist(s)
Justin Gatlin	100 metres	10.06 (-0.8)	3 Q	10.09 (+0.1)	6 q	9.89 (+0.6)	2nd place, silver medalist(s)
Michael Rodgers	100 metres	10.14 (-0.3)	12 Q	10.12 (+0.8)	9	Did not advance	
Kenneth Bednarek	200 metres	21.50 (+0.7)	46	Did not advance			
Noah Lyles	200 metres	20.26 (+0.2)	11 Q	19.86 (+0.1)	1 Q	19.83 (+0.3)	1st place, gold medalist(s)
Rodney Rowe	200 metres	20.92 (+0.5)	43	Did not advance			
Fred Kerley	400 metres	45.19	8 Q	44.25	3 Q	44.17	3rd place, bronze medalist(s)
Michael Norman	400 metres	45.00	2 Q	45.94	22	Did not advance	
Vernon Norwood	400 metres	45.59	15 Q	45.00	10	Did not advance	
Nathan Strother	400 metres	45.71	20 q	45.34	18	Did not advance	
Donavan Brazier	800 metres	1:46.04	12 Q	1:44.87	4 Q	1:42.34	1st place, gold medalist(s)
Bryce Hoppel	800 metres	4:46.01	11 Q	1:45.95	14 Q	1:44.25	4
Brannon Kidder	800 metres	1:46.29	23 q	1:45.62	10	Did not advance	
Clayton Murphy	800 metres	1:45.62	5 Q	1:44.48	3 q	1:47.84	8
Ben Blankenship	1500 metres	3:37.13	12 Q	3:36.98	13	Did not advance	
Matthew Centrowitz Jr.	1500 metres	3:37.69	18 Q	3:36.77	11 q	3:32.81 SB	8
Craig Engels	1500 metres	3:36.34	5 Q	3:36.69	8 Q	3:34.24	10
Paul Chelimo	5000 metres	13:20.18	1 Q	—		13:04.60	7
Hassan Mead	5000 metres	13:22.11	8 q	—		13:27.05	11
Ben True	5000 metres	13:27.39	18	—		Did not advance	
Shadrack Kipchirchir8	10,000 metres	—				27:24.74 SB	10
Leonard Korir	10,000 metres	—				28:05.73	13
Lopez Lomong	10,000 metres	—				27:04.72 PB	7
Andrew Epperson	Marathon	—				2:23:11	46
Elkanah Kibet	Marathon	—				2:19:33 SB	38
Ahmed Osman	Marathon	—				2:16:22 SB	23
Devon Allen	110 metres hurdles	13.46 (+0.2)	13 Q	13.36 (+0.9)	8 q	13.70 (+0.6)	6
Grant Holloway	110 metres hurdles	13.22 (+0.4)	3 Q	13.10(+1.1)	2 Q	13.10 (+0.6)	1st place, gold medalist(s)
Daniel Roberts	110 metres hurdles	DSQ		Did not advance			
Rai Benjamin	400 metres hurdles	49.62	10 Q	48.52	6 Q	47.66	2nd place, silver medalist(s)
TJ Holmes	400 metres hurdles	49.50	7 Q	48.67	7 q	48.20	5
Amere Lattin	400 metres hurdles	49.72	14 q	49.20	15	Did not advance	
Andrew Bayer	3000 metres steeplechase	8:18.66	9 q	—		8:12.47	12
Hillary Bor	3000 metres steeplechase	8:20.67	13 Q	—		8:09.33	8
Stanley Kebenei	3000 metres steeplechase	8:19.02	10 q	—		8:11.15	10
Christian Coleman; Justin Gatlin; Mike Rodgers; Noah Lyles; Cravon Gillespie*	4 × 100 metres relay	38.03	9 Q	—		37.10 WL	1st place, gold medalist(s)
Fred Kerley; Michael Cherry; Wil London; Rai Benjamin; Tyrell Richard*; Vernon Norwood*; Nathan Strother*	4 × 400 metres relay	2:59.89	1 Q	—		2:56.69 WL	1st place, gold medalist(s)

* – Indicates the athlete competed in preliminaries but not the final

Field events

Athlete	Event	Qualification		Final	
Athlete	Event	Distance	Position	Distance	Position
Keenon Laine	High jump	2.17	=26	Did not advance	
Shelby McEwen	High jump	2.26	13	Did not advance	
Jeron Robinson	High jump	2.29	7 q	2.24	11
Zachery Bradford	Pole vault	5.60	20	Did not advance	
Sam Kendricks	Pole vault	5.75	1 Q	5.97	1st place, gold medalist(s)
KC Lightfoot	Pole vault	5.60	=14	Did not advance	
Cole Walsh	Pole vault	5.75	3 Q	5.55	=10
Jeff Henderson	Long jump	8.12 (-0.7)	2 q	8.39 SB	2nd place, silver medalist(s)
Trumaine Jefferson	Long jump	7.63 (-1.0)	21	Did not advance	
Steffin McCarter	Long jump	8.04 (-0.8)	4 q	NM	–
Will Claye	Triple jump	16.97 (-0.1)	5 q	17.74	2nd place, silver medalist(s)
Donald Scott	Triple jump	16.99 (-0.4)	=3 q	17.17	6
Omar Craddock	Triple jump	16.87 (+0.1)	13	Did not advance	
Christian Taylor	Triple jump	16.99 (+0.3)	=3 q	17.92	1st place, gold medalist(s)
Ryan Crouser	Shot put	21.67	3 Q	22.90 PB	2nd place, silver medalist(s)
Darrell Hill	Shot put	21.25	5 Q	21.65	5
Joe Kovacs	Shot put	20.92	12 Q	22.91 CR	1st place, gold medalist(s)
Mason Finley	Discus	63.22	13	Did not advance	
Sam Mattis	Discus	63.96	9 q	63.42	11
Brian Williams	Discus	60.48	27	Did not advance	
Riley Dolezal	Javelin	75.62	26	Did not advance	
Michael Shuey	Javelin	80.53	18	Did not advance	
Daniel Haugh	Hammer throw	72.85	24	Did not advance	
Conor McCullough	Hammer throw	74.88	14	Did not advance	
Rudy Winkler	Hammer throw	77.06	4 Q	75.20	11

Combined events – Decathlon

Athlete	Event	100 m	LJ	SP	HJ	400 m	110H	DT	PV	JT	1500 m	Final	Rank
Solomon Simmons	Result	10.70 (+0.8)	7.37 (+0.3)	15.33	1.96	49.31	14.10	46.26	4.80	53.25	4:44.17	8151	8
Solomon Simmons	Points	929	903	810	767	847	962	793	849	637	654	8151	8
Devon Williams	Result	10.84 (+0.4)	7.36 (+0.0)	13.76	1.93	48.37	13.91	47.32	NM	DNS	—	DNF	
Devon Williams	Points	897	900	714	740	891	986	815	—			DNF	
Harrison Williams	Result	10.76 (+0.8)	7.14 (+0.6)	13.78	1.93	47.93	14.43	44.23	4.80	48.59	4:40.96	7892	14
Harrison Williams	Points	915	847	715	740	913	920	751	849	568	674	7892	14

=== Women ===
Track and road events

Athlete	Event	Heat		Semifinal		Final	
Athlete	Event	Result	Rank	Result	Rank	Result	Rank
Morolake Akinosun	100 metres	11.23 (-0.4)	15 Q	11.17 (+0.5)	10	Did not advance	
Tori Bowie	100 metres	11.30 (-0.1)	22 Q	DNS		Did not advance	
Teahna Daniels	100 metres	11.20 (-0.3)	12 Q	11.10 (+0.8)	8 q	11.19 (+0.1)	7
English Gardner	100 metres	11.20 (-0.4)	11 Q	DNF		Did not advance	
Anglerne Annelus	200 metres	22.56 (-0.1)	3 Q	22.49 (+0.4)	3 Q	22.59 (+0.9)	4
Brittany Brown	200 metres	22.33 (+0.7)	2 Q	22.46 (+0.4)	2 Q	22.22 (+0.9)	2nd place, silver medalist(s)
Dezerea Bryant	200 metres	22.56 (+0.4)	4 Q	22.56 (+0.5)	5 Q	22.63 (+0.9)	5
Kendall Ellis	400 metres	51.82	20 q	51.58	14	Did not advance	
Phyllis Francis	400 metres	50.77	4 Q	50.22	5 Q	49.61	5
Wadeline Jonathas	400 metres	50.57	1 Q	50.07	3 Q	49.60	4
Shakima Wimbley	400 metres	51.17	6 Q	1:13.55	23	Did not advance	
Ce'aira Brown	800 metres	2:01.14	3 Q	2:00.31	5 q	2:02.97	8
Hanna Green	800 metres	2:04.36	35	Did not advance			
Raevyn Rogers	800 metres	2:02.01	9 Q	1:59.57	2Q	1:58.18	2nd place, silver medalist(s)
Ajeé Wilson	800 metres	2:02.10	11 Q	2:00.31	6 Q	1:58.84	3rd place, bronze medalist(s)
Nikki Hiltz	1500 metres	4:04.00	3 Q	4:01.52	7 q	4:06.68	12
Shelby Houlihan	1500 metres	4:08.51	22 Q	4:14.91	13 Q	3:54.99 AR	4
Jenny Simpson	1500 metres	4:07.27	10 Q	4:00.99	1 Q	3:58.42 SB	8
Elinor Purrier	5000 metres	15:08.82	15 q	—		14:58.17 PB	11
Rachel Schneider	5000 metres	15:30.00	19	—		Did not advance	
Karissa Schweizer	5000 metres	14:52.41	2 Q	—		14:45.18 PB	9
Marielle Hall	10,000 metres	—				31:05.71 PB	8
Molly Huddle	10,000 metres	—				31:07.24	9
Emily Sisson	10,000 metres	—				31:12.56	10
Kelsey Bruce	Marathon	—				3:09:37	38
Carrie Dimoff	Marathon	—				2:44:35	13
Roberta Groner	Marathon	—				2:38:44	6
Nia Ali	100 metres hurdles	12.59	4 Q	12.44 PB	2 Q	12.34 PB	1st place, gold medalist(s)
Kendra Harrison	100 metres hurdles	12.55	3 Q	12.58	4 Q	12.46	2nd place, silver medalist(s)
Brianna McNeal	100 metres hurdles	DSQ		Did not advance			
Kori Carter	400 metres hurdles	DNF		Did not advance			
Sydney McLaughlin	400 metres hurdles	54.45	1 Q	53.81	1 Q	52.23	2nd place, silver medalist(s)
Dalilah Muhammad	400 metres hurdles	54.87	3 Q	53.91	2 Q	52.16 WR	1st place, gold medalist(s)
Ashley Spencer	400 metres hurdles	55.28	10 Q	54.42	6 q	54.45	6
Emma Coburn	3000 metres steeplechase	9:23.40	6 Q	—		9:02.35	2nd place, silver medalist(s)
Courtney Frerichs	3000 metres steeplechase	9:18.42	2 Q	—		9:11.27	6
Allie Ostrander	3000 metres steeplechase	9:30.85 PB	14	—		Did not advance	
Dezerea Bryant; Teahna Daniels; Morolake Akinosun; Kiara Parker	4 × 100 metres relay	42.46	4 Q	—		42.10	3rd place, bronze medalist(s)
Phyllis Francis; Sydney McLaughlin; Dalilah Muhammad; Wadeline Jonathas; Jessica Beard*; Allyson Felix*; Kendall Ellis*; Courtney Okolo*	4 × 400 metres relay	3:21.66	1 Q	—		3:19.02 WL	1st place, gold medalist(s)
Maria Michta-Coffey	20 kilometres walk	—				1:36:02 SB	35
Katie Burnett	50 kilometres walk	—				5:23:05	17

* – Indicates the athlete competed in preliminaries but not the final

Field events

Athlete	Event	Qualification		Final	
Athlete	Event	Distance	Position	Distance	Position
Tynita Butts	High jump	1.92 PB	=9 q	1.93	8
Vashti Cunningham	High jump	1.94	=1 Q	2.00	3rd place, bronze medalist(s)
Inika Mcpherson	High jump	1.85	=18	Did not advance	
Sandi Morris	Pole vault	4.60	=1 Q	4.90	2nd place, silver medalist(s)
Katie Nageotte	Pole vault	4.60	=1 Q	4.70	=7
Jenn Suhr	Pole vault	4.60	=1 Q	4.70	=7
Tori Bowie	Long jump	6.77	Q 3	6.81	4
Brittney Reese	Long jump	6.52	13	Did not advance	
Sha'Keela Saunders	Long jump	6.53	12 q	6.54	9
Jasmine Todd	Long jump	6.51	14	Did not advance	
Tori Franklin	Triple jump	14.23	9 q	14.08	9
Keturah Orji	Triple jump	14.30	4 Q	14.46	7
Michelle Carter	Shot put	18.85	4 Q	18.93	4
Chase Ealey	Shot put	17.90	10 q	18.82	7
Maggie Ewen	Shot put	19.21	2 Q	18.41	9
Valarie Allman	Discus throw	62.25	12 q	61.82	7
Kelsey Card	Discus throw	61.32	14	Did not advance	
Laulauga Tausaga	Discus throw	63.94	5 Q	NM	
Ariana Ince	Javelin	60.44	15	Did not advance	
Kara Winger	Javelin	62.13	7 Q	63.23	5
Brooke Andersen	Hammer throw	68.76	20	Did not advance	
Gwen Berry	Hammer throw	71.72	11 q	NM	
DeAnna Price	Hammer throw	73.77	1 Q	77.54	1st place, gold medalist(s)

Combined events – Heptathlon

Athlete	Event	100H	HJ	SP	200 m	LJ	JT	800 m	Final	Rank
Erica Bougard	Result	13.01 (+0.4)	1.86	12.36	23.89 (+1.0)	6.21	43.48	2:09.74	6470	4
Erica Bougard	Points	1123	1054	685	991	915	734	968	6470	4
Chari Hawkins	Result	13.23 (+0.4)	1.77	13.59 PB	24.81 (+1.0)	5.95	40.07	2:16.78 SB	6073	12
Chari Hawkins	Points	1090	941	767	904	834	669	868	6073	12
Annie Kunz	Result	13.27 (+0.6)	1.80 SB	14.58 SB	24.37 (+1.0)	5.95	35.36	2:20.68	6067	13
Annie Kunz	Points	1084	978	833	945	834	579	814	6067	13
Kendell Williams	Result	12.58 (+0.4) CHB	1.77	12.71	23.62 (+1.0) SB	6.28	45.12 SB	2:17.54	6415	5
Kendell Williams	Points	1189	941	708	1017	937	766	857	6415	5

=== Mixed ===
Athlete	Event	Heat		Final	
Athlete	Event	Result	Rank	Result	Rank
Wil London; Allyson Felix; Courtney Okolo; Michael Cherry; Tyrell Richard*; Jessica Beard*; Jasmine Blocker*; Obi Igbokwe*	4 × 400 m relay	3:12.42 WR	1 Q	3:09.34 WR	1st place, gold medalist(s)
