= Mixed 4 × 400 metres relay world record progression =

The following table shows the world record progression in the mixed 4 × 400 metres relay. The first world record in the event was recognised by the International Association of Athletics Federations in 2019.

== Prior to Official Recognition ==
| Time | Team | Country | Venue | Date | Ref. |
|---|---|---|---|---|---|
| 3:13.20 | Kyle Clemons; Claudia Francis; James Harris; Phyllis Francis | United States | Eugene | 29 July 2016 | |

== Officially Recognised ==
Awaiting ratification

| Time | Team | Country | Venue | Date | Ref. |
|---|---|---|---|---|---|
| 3:12.42 | Tyrell Richard; Jessica Beard; Jasmine Blocker; Obi Igbokwe | United States | Doha | 28 September 2019 | |
| 3:09.34 | Wilbert London; Allyson Felix; Courtney Okolo; Michael Cherry | United States | Doha | 29 September 2019 | |
| 3:08.80 | Justin Robinson; Rosey Effiong; Matthew Boling; Alexis Holmes | United States | Budapest | 19 August 2023 | |
| 3:07.41 | Vernon Norwood; Shamier Little; Bryce Deadmon; Kaylyn Brown | United States | Saint-Denis | 2 August 2024 | |
