= Stephenie Ann McPherson =

Jamaican sprinter

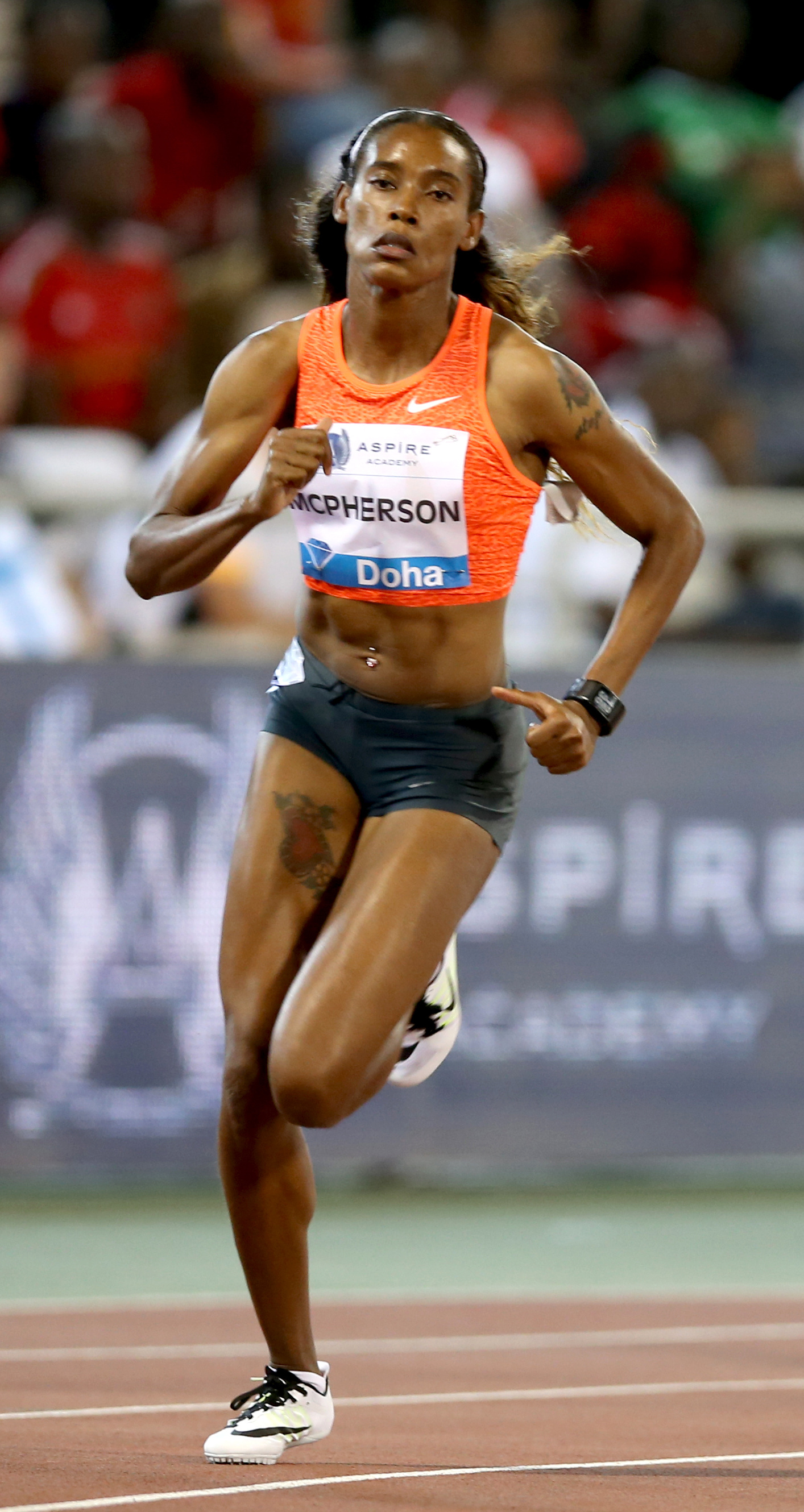

Personal information
- Born: 25 November 1988 (age 37) Westmoreland Parish, Jamaica
- Home town: Kingston, Jamaica
- Height: 1.73 m (5 ft 8 in)
- Weight: 55 kg (121 lb)

Sport
- Country: Jamaica
- Sport: Track and field
- Event: 400 metres
- Club: MVP Track & Field Club
- Coached by: Stephen Francis

Achievements and titles
- Personal bests: 400 m: 49.34 (2021); Indoors; 400 m: 50.79i Former NR (2022)
Medal record
Women's track and field
Representing Jamaica
Olympic Games
Silver medal – second place	2016 Rio de Janeiro	4 × 400 m relay
World Championships
Gold medal – first place	2015 Beijing	4 × 400 m relay
Silver medal – second place	2022 Eugene	4 × 400 m relay
Bronze medal – third place	2013 Moscow	400 m
Bronze medal – third place	2019 Doha	4 × 400 m relay
World Indoor Championships
Gold medal – first place	2022 Belgrade	4 × 400 m relay
Silver medal – second place	2014 Sopot	4 × 400 m relay
Bronze medal – third place	2022 Belgrade	400 m
Diamond League
First place	2016	400 m
Pan American Games
Bronze medal – third place	2019 Lima	4 × 400 m relay
Commonwealth Games
Gold medal – first place	2014 Glasgow	400 m
Gold medal – first place	2014 Glasgow	4 × 400 m relay
Gold medal – first place	2018 Gold Coast	4 × 400 m relay
Bronze medal – third place	2018 Gold Coast	400 m
NACAC Championships
Gold medal – first place	2018 Toronto	400 m
Silver medal – second place	2018 Toronto	4 × 400 m relay
Bronze medal – third place	2022 Freeport	400 m
Representing Americas
Continental Cup
Gold medal – first place	2014 Marrakesh	4 × 400 m relay
Gold medal – first place	2018 Ostrava	Mixed relay
Bronze medal – third place	2018 Ostrava	400 m

Stephenie Ann McPherson (born 25 November 1988) is a Jamaican retired track and field athlete, who specializes in the 400 metres. She has won a bronze medal in the event at the 2013 World Championships, and then placed in the finals of both the 2016 Rio Olympics and the 2020 Tokyo Olympics and all four following World Championships between 2015 and 2022, consecutively. McPherson earned also a bronze at the 2022 World Indoor Championships. She added medals in the 4 × 400 metres relays, taking a silver at the 2016 Olympics, a gold in 2015 in Beijing, and a bronze in 2019.

In June 2021, McPherson went sub-50 seconds for the first time since 2013, the only year in which she had achieved it, setting her new personal best. She retired after competing at the 2024 Summer Olympics.

== Career ==
McPherson was the silver medalist from the 2014 World Indoor Championships as a member of the 4 × 400 metres relay team. She took two gold medals at the Commonwealth Games winning the individual 400 m and the 4 × 400 m relay. Within that same year, she added the gold medal at the Continental Cup as a part of team America in the 4 × 400 m relay.

In 2022, McPherson won her second global medal after a bronze at the 2013 World Championships, taking also a bronze for the women's 400 metres at the World Indoor Championships in Belgrade, Serbia with a national indoor record of 50.79 seconds. Thus, she improved on her fourth place from the 2016 World Indoors. McPherson also anchored Jamaican women's 4 × 400 relay, winning gold along with teammates Junelle Bromfield, Janieve Russell, and Roneisha McGregor.

== Achievements ==
All information taken from World Athletics profile.

=== Personal bests ===
Event	Time (s)	Venue	Date	Notes
200 metres	22.90	Kingston, Jamaica	17 April 2021	
400 metres	49.34	Tokyo, Japan	4 August 2021	#3 Jamaican all-time
400 metres indoor	50.79	Belgrade, Serbia	19 March 2022	NR

=== International competitions ===
Representing Jamaica
Year	Competition	Venue	Position	Event	Result
2013	World Championships	Moscow, Russia	3rd	400 m	49.99
2014	World Indoor Championships	Sopot, Poland	2nd	4 × 400 m relay	3:26.54
2014	Commonwealth Games	Glasgow, United Kingdom	1st	400 m	50.67
2014	Commonwealth Games	Glasgow, United Kingdom	1st	4 × 400 m relay	3:23.82
2014	Continental Cup	Marrakesh, Morocco	1st	4 × 400 m relay	3:20.93 WL (Note: Representing Americas)
2015	World Relays	Nassau, Bahamas	2nd	4 × 400 m relay	3:22.49
2015	World Championships	Beijing, China	5th	400 m	50.42
2015	World Championships	Beijing, China	1st	4 × 400 m relay	3:19.13 WL
2016	World Indoor Championships	Portland, United States	4th	400 m	52.20
2016	World Indoor Championships	Portland, United States	DNF	4 × 400 m relay	DNF
2016	Olympic Games	Rio de Janeiro, Brazil	6th	400 m	50.97
2016	Olympic Games	Rio de Janeiro, Brazil	2nd	4 × 400 m relay	3:20.34
2017	World Relays	Nassau, Bahamas	3rd	4 × 400 m relay	3:28.49
2017	World Championships	London, United Kingdom	6th	400 m	50.86
2017	World Championships	London, United Kingdom	DNF	4 × 400 m relay	DNF
2018	World Indoor Championships	Birmingham, United Kingdom	DQ	400 m	DQ (Note: Disqualified in the semi-finals; 163.3(a): Lane infringement)
2018	World Indoor Championships	Birmingham, United Kingdom	DQ	4 × 400 m relay	DQ (Note: Disqualified in the final; 218.4: Exchanging position before takeover)
2018	Commonwealth Games	Gold Coast, Australia	3rd	400 m	50.93
2018	Commonwealth Games	Gold Coast, Australia	1st	4 × 400 m relay	3:24.00
2018	World Cup	London, United Kingdom	1st	400 m	50.98
2018	World Cup	London, United Kingdom	2nd	4 × 400 m relay	3:24.29
2018	NACAC Championships	Toronto, Canada	1st	400 m	51.15
2018	NACAC Championships	Toronto, Canada	2nd	4 × 400 m relay	3:27.25
2018	Continental Cup	Ostrava, Czech Republic	3rd	400 m	50.82
2018	Continental Cup	Ostrava, Czech Republic	1st	4 × 400 m mixed	3:13.01
2019	World Relays	Yokohama, Japan	3rd	4 × 200 m relay	1:33.21
2019	Pan American Games	Lima, Peru	3rd	4 × 400 m relay	3:27.61
2019	World Championships	Doha, Qatar	6th	400 m	50.89
2019	World Championships	Doha, Qatar	3rd	4 × 400 m relay	3:22.37
2021	Olympic Games	Tokyo, Japan	4th	400 m	49.61
2022	World Indoor Championships	Belgrade, Serbia	3rd	400 m i	50.79
2022	World Indoor Championships	Belgrade, Serbia	1st	4 × 400 m relay i	3:28.40 SB
2022	World Championships	Eugene, United States	5th	400 m	50.36
2022	World Championships	Eugene, United States	2nd	4 × 400 m relay	3:20.74
2022	NACAC Championships	Freeport, Bahamas	3rd	400 m	50.36
2024	Olympic Games	Paris, France	4th (h)	4 × 400 m relay	3:24.92^{1}

^{1}Did not finish in the final

=== Circuit wins and titles ===
- Diamond League winner (400 m): 2016. (400 metres wins)
  - 2015: Birmingham British Grand Prix
  - 2016: Oslo Bislett Games
  - 2018: London Anniversary Games
  - 2019: Paris Meeting
  - 2021: Gateshead British Grand Prix
- Continental Tour – gold level
  - 2021 (400 m): Székesfehérvár Gyulai István Memorial

=== National titles ===
- Jamaican Athletics Championships
  - 400 m (3 (Note: According to Jamaica Observer McPherson is a four-time national champion, however the newspaper's article has at least one other serious error)): 2016, 2018, 2021
