= 2019 World Athletics Championships – Mixed 4 × 400 metres relay =

World Athletics Championship event

Mixed 4 × 400 metres relay at the 2019 World Championships
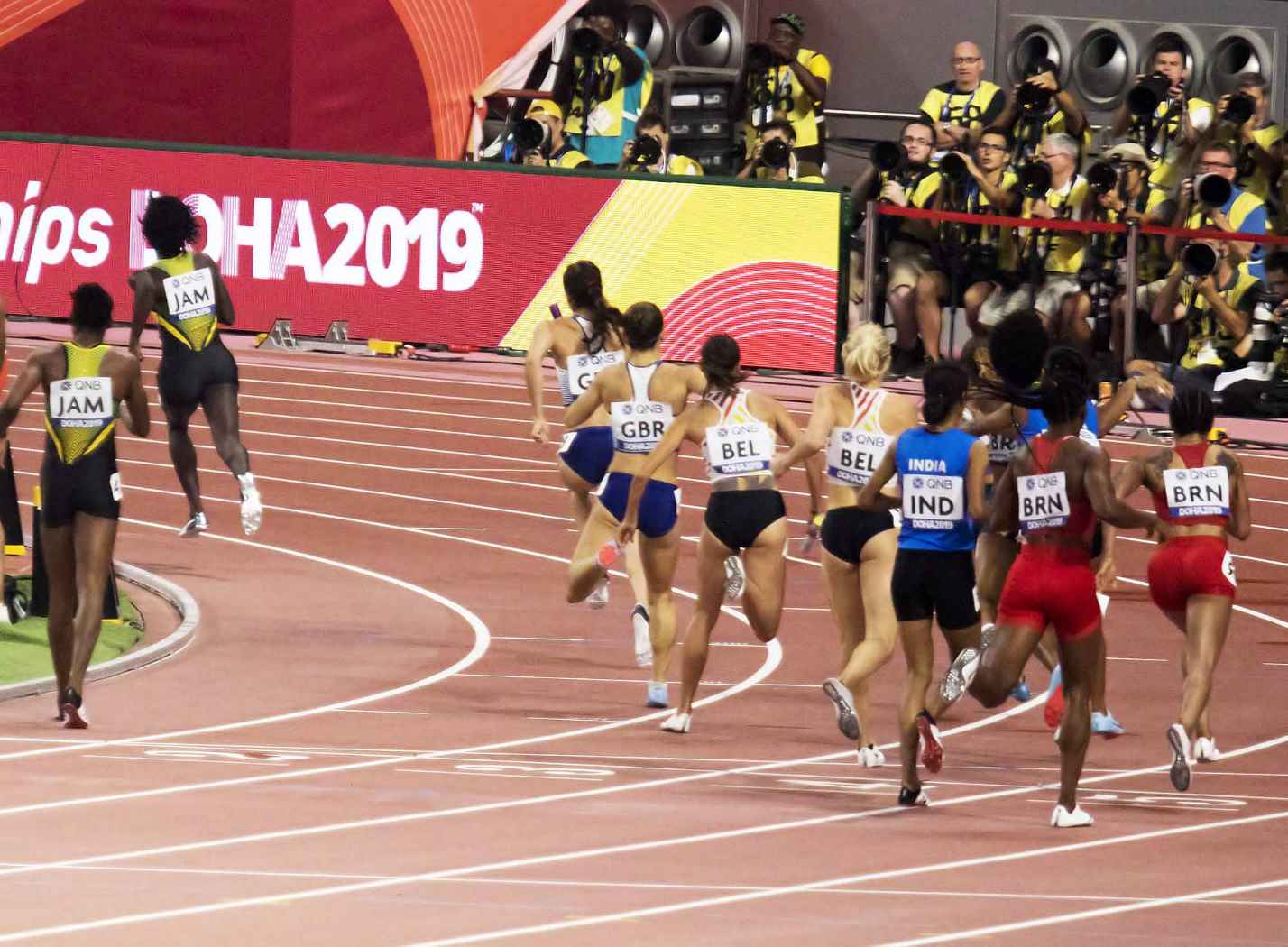
- The final.
- Venue: Khalifa International Stadium
- Dates: 28 September (heats); 29 September (final)
- Competitors: 74 from 16 nations
- Teams: 16
- Winning time: 3:09.34

Medalists
gold medal	Wilbert London; Allyson Felix; Courtney Okolo; Michael Cherry; Tyrell Richard*; Jessica Beard*; Jasmine Blocker*; Obi Igbokwe*	United States
silver medal	Nathon Allen; Roneisha McGregor; Tiffany James; Javon Francis; Janieve Russell*	Jamaica
bronze medal	Musa Isah; Aminat Yusuf Jamal; Salwa Eid Naser; Abbas Abubakar Abbas	Bahrain

Video on YouTube Official Video

The mixed 4 × 400 metres relay at the 2019 World Athletics Championships was held at the Khalifa International Stadium in Doha from 28 to 29 September 2019.

The winning margin was 2.44 seconds which as of 2024 is the greatest winning margin for this mixed relay at these championships.

== Summary ==
This was the first time for this event in the World Championships. In the first heat, Tyrell Richard and Nathon Allen handed off virtually even for the United States and Jamaica respectively. Jessica Beard ran a fast first turn to close the door on Janieve Russell to give USA the lead at the break. Beard's 51.2 leg put a 5 metre gap on Russell before she handed off to Jasmine Blocker who let the lead shrink to GBR's Emily Diamond before opening up the gap again on the home stretch, her leg in 51.27. Behind them, Salwa Eid Naser ran Bahrain from well off the pace back into contention. Holding a 5 metre lead, Obi Igbokwe ran strong as Martyn Rooney for GBR, Javon Francis for Jamaica and Abubaker Abbas for Bahrain all closed the gap on the home stretch. USA crossed the finish line first in 3:12.42, barely ahead of the blanket finish of Jamaica 3:12.73, Bahrain 3:12.74 and GBR 3:12.80, the four fastest times in the short history of this event, including USA's world record, in a qualifying heat. The previous world record holding and world leading team from Poland won the second heat.

In the final, USA brought in four fresh athletes. From the gun, Wilbert London took the early lead with Muhammed Anas putting India into second position, making up the stagger on Musa Isah from Bahrain. As London came in to hand off, he ran up and almost passed Allyson Felix still in the lead. Running their second man, Poland's Rafał Omelko made up the gap and passed Felix before the break. As Omelko ran away, Felix still held a two metre gap over Jamaica's Roneisha McGregor. Poland's women were also fresh. Iga Baumgart-Witan took the baton with a 50 metre lead for Poland with USA's Courtney Okolo ahead of Jamaica's fresh legs Tiffany James in hot pursuit. On the final turn of the leg, Okolo's 49.9 separated from James as Poland's lead shrunk slightly while again Eid Naser was running Bahrain back into contention. Justyna Święty-Ersetic took the baton in the lead, but with a 10 metre gap on Jamaica, Michael Cherry smelled blood. It took him 150 metres to pass Święty-Ersetic, USA was clear of the field and on to victory. Behind them Abbas ran Bahrain around Rooney in the first turn, chasing Francis. Święty-Ersetic was able to hold the other teams off until the home stretch but then Jamaica, Bahrain and at the line GBR passed her with Abbas diving in vain at the finish to try to catch Francis for silver before crashing to the track.

In the end, the first five teams beat the world record from the previous evening. USA's 3:09.34 took over three seconds off their own world record. Bahrain and Great Britain set continental records, while Jamaica, Poland and Belgium set national records. Coming off of childbirth merely 10 months earlier, Felix's 50.4 leg was critical to USA's win. Already the World Championship medal leader, Felix's 12th gold medal surpassed Usain Bolt as the all time gold medal winner. Later in the meet, Felix added an additional gold running the preliminary round of the 4x400 relay, her 13th.

== Schedule ==
The event schedule, in local time (UTC+3), was as follows:

Date	Time	Round
28 September	20:00	Heats
29 September	22:35	Final

== Results ==
=== Heats ===
The first three in each heat (Q) and the next two fastest (q) qualify for the final.

Rank	Heat	Nation	Athletes	Time	Notes
1	1	United States (USA)	Tyrell Richard (M), Jessica Beard (W), Jasmine Blocker (W), Obi Igbokwe (M)	3:12.42	Q, WR
2	1	Jamaica (JAM)	Nathon Allen (M), Janieve Russell (W), Roneisha McGregor (W), Javon Francis (M)	3:12.73	Q, NR
3	1	Bahrain (BHR)	Musa Isah (M), Aminat Yusuf Jamal (W), Salwa Eid Naser (W), Abbas Abubakar Abbas (M)	3:12.74	Q, AR
4	1	Great Britain & N.I. (GBR)	Rabah Yousif (M), Zoey Clark (W), Emily Diamond (W), Martyn Rooney (M)	3:12.80	q, AR
5	2	Poland (POL)	Wiktor Suwara (M), Anna Kiełbasińska (W), Małgorzata Hołub-Kowalik (W), Rafał Omelko (M)	3:15.47	Q
6	2	Brazil (BRA)	Anderson Henriques (M), Tiffani Marinho (W), Geisa Coutinho (W), Lucas Carvalho (M)	3:16.12	Q, AR
7	2	India (IND)	Muhammed Anas (M), V. K. Vismaya (W), Jisna Mathew (W), Noah Nirmal Tom (M)	3:16.14	Q, SB
8	2	Belgium (BEL)	Robin Vanderbemden (M), Camille Laus (W), Imke Vervaet (W), Dylan Borlée (M)	3:16.16	q, NR
9	2	Italy (ITA)	Edoardo Scotti (M), Giancarla Trevisan (W), Raphaela Lukudo (W), Brayan Lopez (M)	3:16.52	
10	1	Canada (CAN)	Austin Cole (M), Aiyanna Stiverne (W), Madeline Price (W), Philip Osei (M)	3:16.76	NR
11	2	Kenya (KEN)	Alphas Kishoyian (M), Gladys Musyoki (W), Mary Moraa (W), Alex Sampao (M)	3:17.09	
12	1	France (FRA)	Mame-Ibra Anne (M), Amandine Brossier (W), Agnès Raharolahy (W), Thomas Jordier (M)	3:17.17	NR
13	1	Ukraine (UKR)	Danylo Danylenko (M), Tetyana Melnyk (W), Kateryna Klymiuk (W), Oleksiy Pozdnyakov (M)	3:17.50	
14	2	Germany (GER)	Marvin Schlegel (M), Luna Bulmahn (W), Karolina Pahlitzsch (W), Manuel Sanders (M)	3:17.85	
15	1	Czech Republic (CZE)	Jan Tesař (M), Lada Vondrová (W), Tereza Petržilková (W), Patrik Šorm (M)	3:18.01	
16	2	Japan (JPN)	Seika Aoyama (W), Kota Wakabayashi (M), Tomoya Tamura (M), Saki Takashima (W)	3:18.77	NR

=== Final ===
The final was started on 29 September at 22:35.

Rank	Nation	Athletes	Time	Notes
1st place, gold medalist(s)	United States (USA)	Wilbert London (M), Allyson Felix (W), Courtney Okolo (W), Michael Cherry (M)	3:09.34	WR
2nd place, silver medalist(s)	Jamaica (JAM)	Nathon Allen (M), Roneisha McGregor (W), Tiffany James (W), Javon Francis (M)	3:11.78	NR
3rd place, bronze medalist(s)	Bahrain (BHR)	Musa Isah (M), Aminat Yusuf Jamal (W), Salwa Eid Naser (W), Abbas Abubakar Abbas (M)	3:11.82	AR
4	Great Britain & N.I. (GBR)	Rabah Yousif (M), Zoey Clark (W), Emily Diamond (W), Martyn Rooney (M)	3:12.27	AR
5	Poland (POL)	Wiktor Suwara (M), Rafał Omelko (M), Iga Baumgart-Witan (W), Justyna Święty-Ersetic (W)	3:12.33	NR
6	Belgium (BEL)	Dylan Borlée (M), Hanne Claes (W), Camille Laus (W), Kevin Borlée (M)	3:14.22	NR
7	India (IND)	Muhammed Anas (M), V. K. Vismaya (W), Jisna Mathew (W), Noah Nirmal Tom (M)	3:15.77	SB
8	Brazil (BRA)	Lucas Carvalho (M), Tiffani Marinho (W), Geisa Coutinho (W), Alexander Russo (M)	3:16.22	
