= 2019 World Athletics Championships – Women's 4 × 400 metres relay =

Women's 4 × 400 metres relay at the 2019 World Championships
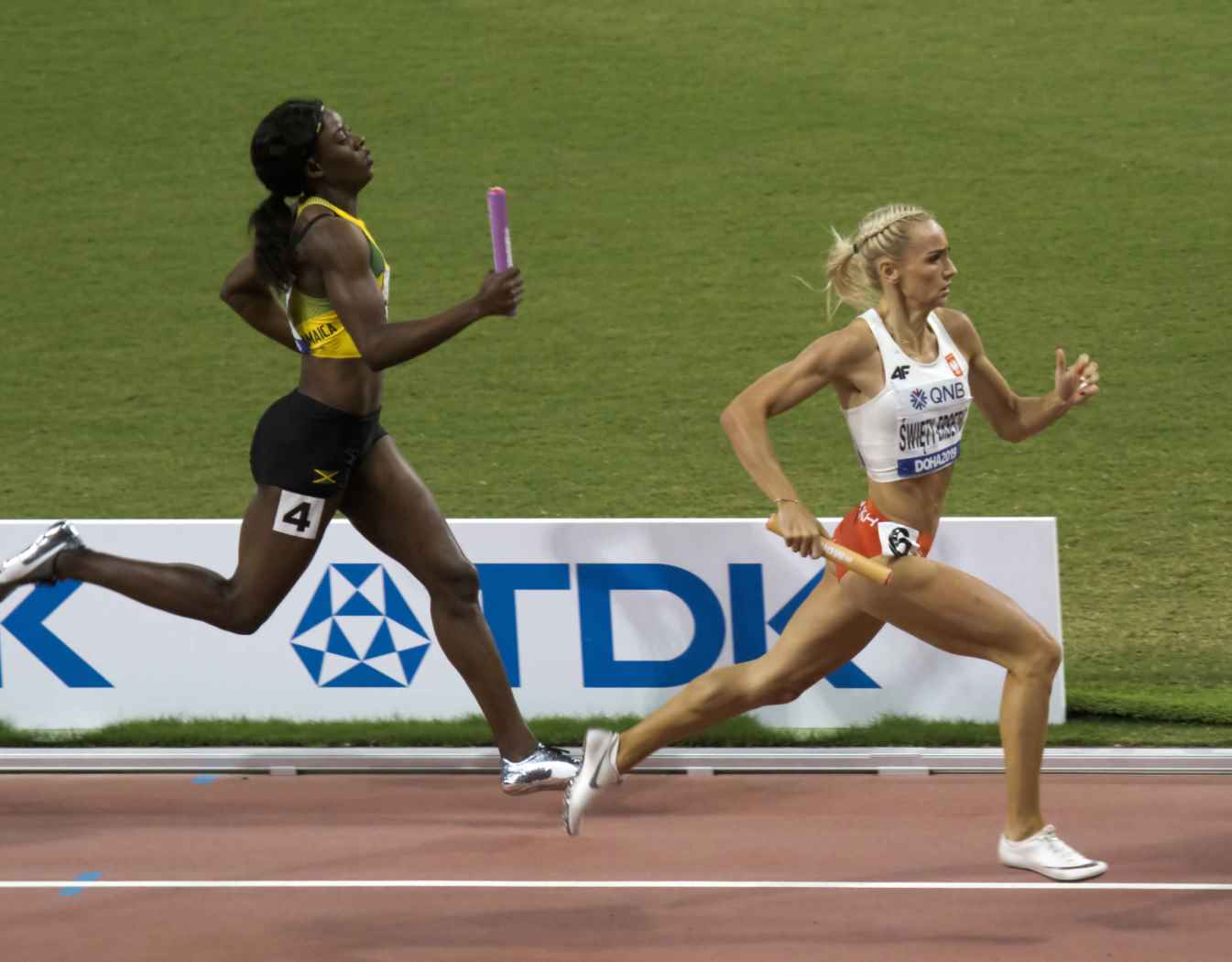
- Justyna Święty-Ersetic and Shericka Jackson running in the final round
- Venue: Khalifa International Stadium
- Dates: 5 October (heats); 6 October (final)
- Competitors: 67 from 15 nations
- Teams: 15
- Winning time: 3:18.92

Medalists
gold medal	Phyllis Francis; Sydney McLaughlin; Dalilah Muhammad; Wadeline Jonathas; Jessica Beard*; Allyson Felix*; Kendall Ellis*; Courtney Okolo*	United States
silver medal	Iga Baumgart-Witan; Patrycja Wyciszkiewicz; Małgorzata Hołub-Kowalik; Justyna Święty-Ersetic; Anna Kiełbasińska*	Poland
bronze medal	Anastasia Le-Roy; Tiffany James; Stephenie Ann McPherson; Shericka Jackson; Roneisha McGregor*	Jamaica

Video on YouTube Official Video

The women's 4 × 400 metres relay at the 2019 World Athletics Championships was held at the Khalifa International Stadium in Doha, Qatar, from 5 to 6 October 2019. In the final the Jamaican team were initially disqualified, but were reinstated as the bronze medallists upon appeal.

== Summary ==
Most events during the year feature a different level of participation, as these teams represent top athletes from their respective countries. Even the IAAF World Relays do not always include every leading competitor. In Heat 1, Jamaica recorded the world-leading time, and in Heat 2, the United States surpassed it, setting up a competitive final.

Like the mixed relay, USA was able to assemble a new team of four fresh athletes. Phyllis Francis led off taking an early lead, making up the 3-turn stagger distance and passing both teams, Canada and Ukraine to her outside early into the final turn. Poland's lone fresh athlete Iga Baumgart-Witan and Jamaica's Anastasia Le-Roy held relatively close to the stagger, passing just three step and five steps behind. GBR's Zoey Clark and Belgium's Hanne Claes kept them in the mix after one leg. Second leg for USA was their young hurdling star Sydney McLaughlin. She was so far ahead at the break, there was no need for strategic maneuvering, and she ran a perfect tangent from lane 7 to the beginning of the far turn taking a 5-metre lead on Patrycja Wyciszkiewicz with Britain's Jodie Williams close behind. McLaughlin built up a 9-metre lead by her handoff to the hurdle world record holder Dalilah Muhammad, who true to form from her hurdle race, took off hard, expanding the gap to 15 metres through the first turn. It was almost 20 metres over Poland's Małgorzata Hołub-Kowalik by the handoff, which behind her, Jamaica's Stephenie Ann McPherson was able to pull back lost ground against Britain's fresh Emily Diamond. On anchor USA put 400 meter 4th place Wadeline Jonathas, Jamaica had their rested bronze medalist Shericka Jackson while Poland also had their best finalist, 7th place Justyna Święty-Ersetic, but with that lead, the battle was for silver. Tightening the gap through the turn, Jackson ran by GBR's Laviai Nielsen and Święty-Ersetic on the backstretch. With Jonathas long gone over 20 metres ahead, Święty-Ersetic stayed on Jackson's shoulder through the final turn then pulled into lane 2 for running room. She couldn't sprint by Jackson, but Święty-Ersetic slowly narrowed the gap. Just before Jonathas crossed the finish line, Święty-Ersetic edged back ahead. Unable to respond, Jackson gave up the fight and eased across the finish line with bronze 3 metres behind.

Aided by legs of 49.51 by Francis, 49.78 by McLaughlin, 49.43 by Muhammad and 50.20 by Jonathas, USA ran the #18 time in history. Allyson Felix ran a 49.8 leg in the preliminary round and received a gold medal. It added to her record totals, now of 13 gold and 18 total medals at the World Championships.

== Records ==
Before the competition records were as follows:

Record	Perf.	Team	Date	Location
World	3:15.17	Soviet Union; Tatyana Ledovskaya, Olga Nazarova, Mariya Kulchunova, Olga Bryzgina	1 Oct 1988	Seoul, South Korea
Championship	3:16.71	United States; Gwen Torrence, Maicel Malone-Wallace, Natasha Kaiser-Brown, Jearl Miles Clark	22 Aug 1993	Stuttgart, Germany
World leading	3:24.04	United States U23; Alexis Holmes, Kimberley Harris, Ziyah Holman, Kayla Davis	21 Jul 2019	San José, Costa Rica
African	3:21.04	Nigeria; Olabisi Afolabi, Fatima Yusuf, Charity Opara, Falilat Ogunkoya	3 Aug 1996	Atlanta, United States
Asian record	3:24.28	China Hebei Province; An Xiaohong, Bai Xiaoyun, Cao Chunying, Ma Yuqin	13 Sep 1993	Beijing, China
NACAC	3:15.51	United States; Denean Howard-Hill, Diane Dixon, Valerie Brisco-Hooks, Florence Griffith Joyner	1 Oct 1988	Seoul, South Korea
South American	3:26.68	Brazil BM&F Bovespa; Geisa Aparecida Coutinho, Bárbara de Oliveira, Joelma Sousa, Jailma de Lima	7 Aug 2011	São Paulo, Brazil
European	3:15.17	Soviet Union; Tatyana Ledovskaya, Olga Nazarova, Mariya Kulchunova, Olga Bryzgina	1 Oct 1988	Seoul, South Korea
Oceanian	3:23.81	Australia; Nova Peris, Tamsyn Manou, Melinda Gainsford-Taylor, Cathy Freeman	30 Sep 2000	Sydney, Australia

The following records were matched or set at the competition:

Record	Perf.	Team	Date
World Leading	3:22.96	United States; Jessica Beard, Allyson Felix, Kendall Ellis, Courtney Okolo	5 Oct 2019
World Leading	3:23.64	Jamaica; Roneisha McGregor, Anastasia Le-Roy, Tiffany James, Stephenie Ann McPherson	5 Oct 2019
Belgian	3:26.58	Belgium; Hanne Claes, Imke Vervaet, Paulien Couckuyt, Camille Laus	5 Oct 2019
World leading	3:18.92	United States; Phyllis Francis, Sydney McLaughlin, Dalilah Muhammad, Wadeline Jonathas	6 Oct 2019
Polish	3:21.89	Poland; Iga Baumgart-Witan, Patrycja Wyciszkiewicz, Małgorzata Hołub-Kowalik, Justyna Święty-Ersetic	6 Oct 2019

== Schedule ==
The event schedule, in local time (UTC+3), was as follows:

Date	Time	Round
5 October	19:55	Heats
6 October	21:15	Final

== Results ==
=== Heats ===
The first three in each heat (Q) and the next two fastest (q) qualified for the final.

Rank	Heat	Lane	Nation	Athletes	Time	Notes
1	2	6	United States	Jessica Beard, Allyson Felix, Kendall Ellis, Courtney Okolo	3:22.96	Q, WL
2	1	7	Jamaica	Roneisha McGregor, Anastasia Le-Roy, Tiffany James, Stephenie Ann McPherson	3:23.64	Q, WL
3	2	3	Great Britain & N.I.	Zoey Clark, Jodie Williams, Jessica Turner, Laviai Nielsen	3:24.99	Q, SB
4	1	4	Poland	Anna Kiełbasińska, Małgorzata Hołub-Kowalik, Patrycja Wyciszkiewicz, Justyna Święty-Ersetic	3:25.78	Q
5	1	8	Canada	Alicia Brown, Aiyanna Stiverne, Madeline Price, Sage Watson	3:25.86	Q, SB
6	2	2	Ukraine	Kateryna Klymiuk, Olha Lyakhova, Tetyana Melnyk, Hanna Ryzhykova	3:26.57	Q, SB
7	2	4	Belgium	Hanne Claes, Imke Vervaet, Paulien Couckuyt, Camille Laus	3:26.58	q, NR
8	1	3	Netherlands	Lieke Klaver, Lisanne de Witte, Bianca Baak, Femke Bol	3:27.40	q, SB
9	2	9	Italy	Maria Benedicta Chigbolu, Ayomide Folorunso, Giancarla Trevisan, Raphaela Lukudo	3:27.57	
10	1	5	Australia	Bendere Oboya, Lauren Boden, Ellie Beer, Rebecca Bennett	3:28.64	SB
11	1	6	India	Jisna Mathew, M. R. Poovamma, V. K. Vismaya, Venkatesan Subha	3:29.42	SB
12	1	9	France	Amandine Brossier, Déborah Sananes, Élise Trynkler, Agnès Raharolahy	3:29.66	SB
13	2	5	Cuba	Zurian Hechavarría, Rose Mary Almanza, Adriana Rodríguez, Roxana Gómez	3:29.84	SB
14	2	8	Switzerland	Léa Sprunger, Fanette Humair, Rachel Pellaud, Yasmin Giger	3:30.63	
15	1	2	Nigeria	Blessing Oladoye, Patience Okon George, Abike Funmilola Egbeniyi, Favour Ofili	3:35.90	
	2	7	Botswana		DNS	

=== Final ===
The final was started on 6 October at 21:19.

Rank	Lane	Nation	Athletes	Time	Notes
1st place, gold medalist(s)	7	United States	Phyllis Francis, Sydney McLaughlin, Dalilah Muhammad, Wadeline Jonathas	3:18.92	WL
2nd place, silver medalist(s)	6	Poland	Iga Baumgart-Witan, Patrycja Wyciszkiewicz, Małgorzata Hołub-Kowalik, Justyna Święty-Ersetic	3:21.89	NR
3rd place, bronze medalist(s)	4	Jamaica	Anastasia Le-Roy, Tiffany James, Stephenie Ann McPherson, Shericka Jackson	3:22.37	SB
4	5	Great Britain & N.I.	Zoey Clark, Jodie Williams, Emily Diamond, Laviai Nielsen	3:23.02	SB
5	2	Belgium	Hanne Claes, Imke Vervaet, Paulien Couckuyt, Camille Laus	3:27.15	
6	8	Ukraine	Kateryna Klymiuk, Olha Lyakhova, Tetyana Melnyk, Hanna Ryzhykova	3:27.48	
7	3	Netherlands	Lieke Klaver, Lisanne de Witte, Bianca Baak, Femke Bol	3:27.89	
	9	Canada	Alicia Brown, Aiyanna Stiverne, Madeline Price, Sage Watson	DSQ	163.3(a)
