= Musa Isah =

Bahraini athlete

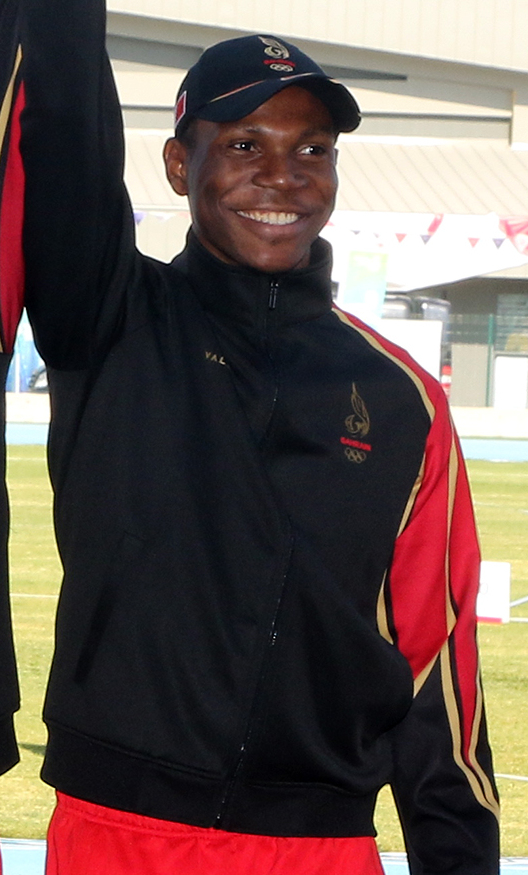

Personal information
- Full name: Musa Ali Isah
- Nationality: Bahraini
- Born: 26 August 2000 (age 25)

Sport
- Country: Bahrain
- Sport: Athletics
- Event: Sprinting
Medal record
Men's athletics
Representing Bahrain
World Championships
Bronze medal – third place	2019 Doha	4 × 400 m mixed
Asian Games
Gold medal – first place	2022 Hangzhou	4 × 400 m mixed
Asian Championships
Gold medal – first place	2019 Doha	4 × 400 m mixed
Arab Games
Bronze medal – third place	2023 Bir El Djir	400 m
Islamic Solidarity Games
Gold medal – first place	2017 Baku	4 × 100 m
Gold medal – first place	2021 Konya	4 × 400 m mixed
Bronze medal – third place	2021 Konya	4 × 400 m
Military World Games
Gold medal – first place	2019 Wuhan	4 × 400 m relay
Bronze medal – third place	2019 Wuhan	400 m
GCC Games
Gold medal – first place	2022 Kuwait City	4 × 400 m relay

Musa Ali Isah (born 26 August 2000) is a Nigerian-born Bahraini athlete. He competed in the mixed 4 × 400 metres relay event at the 2019 World Athletics Championships, winning the bronze medal.
