= Saki Takashima =

Japanese sprinter

Personal information
- Nationality: Japanese
- Born: 18 February 2002 (age 23)

Sport
- Sport: Athletics
- Event: Sprinting

Saki Takashima (高島 咲季, Takashima Saki; born 18 February 2002) is a Japanese athlete. She competed in the mixed 4 × 400 metres relay event at the 2019 World Athletics Championships.
