= Diane Dixon =

Diane Dixon may refer to the following people:

- Diane Dixon (politician) (fl. 1970s–2020s), American politician currently serving in the California State Assembly
- Diane Dixon (sprinter) (born 1964), American sprinter
