= Wadeline Venlogh =

American athlete

Wadeline Venlogh OLY
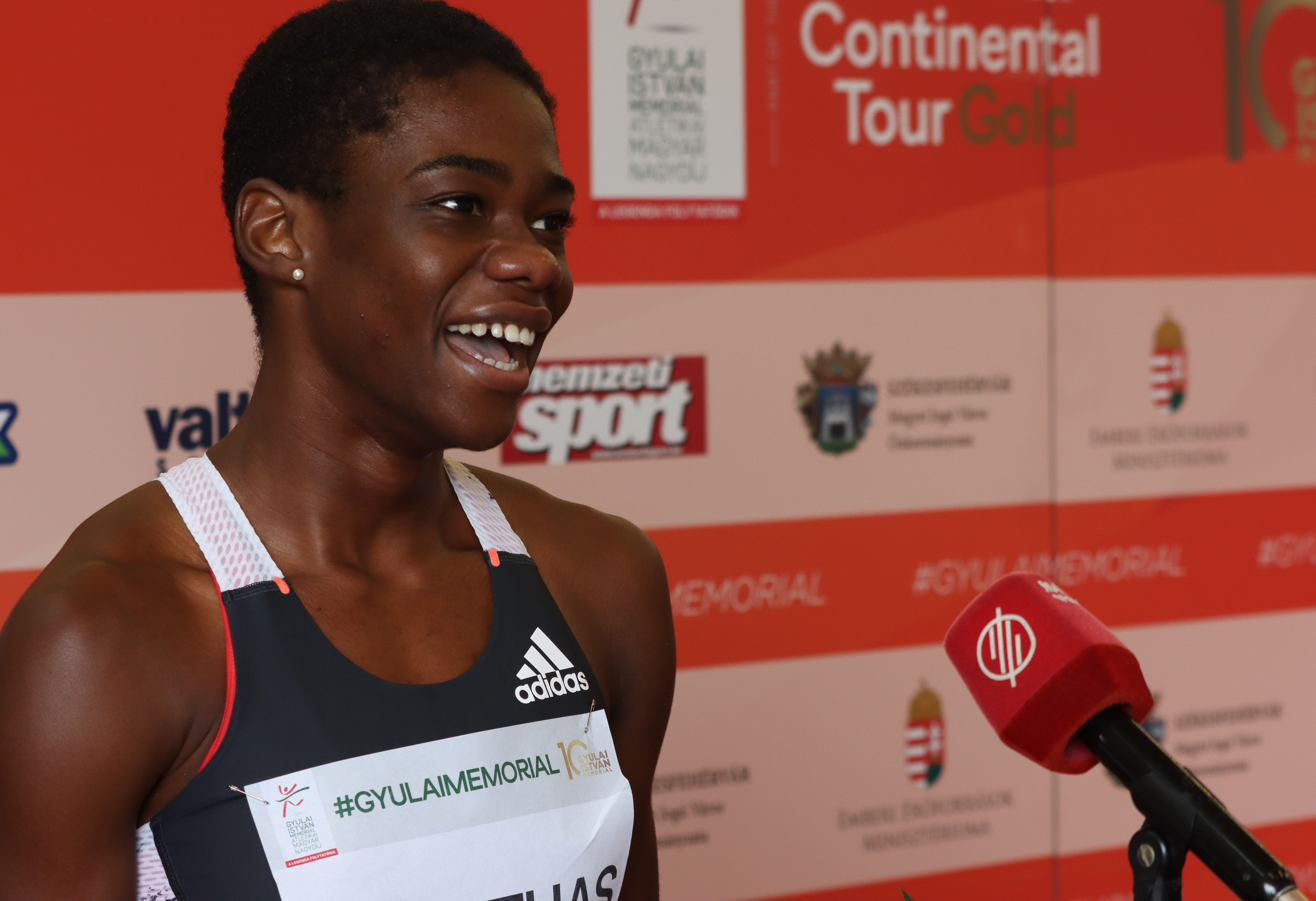
- Jonathas at the 2020 Gyulai István Memorial

Personal information
- Nationality: Haiti; United States
- Born: Wadeline Jonathas; February 19, 1998 (age 28) Gonaïves, Haiti
- Height: 1.78 m (5 ft 10 in)

Sport
- Country: Haiti
- Sport: Track and field
- Events: 400 m, 200 m
- Turned pro: 2020
- Coached by: Karim Abdel Wahab; Curtis Frye

Achievements and titles
- Personal bests: 400 m: 49.60 400 m (i): 51.32; 200 m: 22.91 Long Jump: 6.28 m
Medal record
Women's athletics
Representing United States
Olympic Games
Gold medal – first place	2020 Tokyo	4×400m relay
World Championships
Gold medal – first place	2019 Doha	4×400m relay
Bronze medal – third place	2022 Eugene	4×400m mixed
NACAC Championships
Silver medal – second place	2025 Freeport	400 m

Wadeline Venlogh (born February 19, 1998, in Gonaïves, Haiti) is a Haitian track and field athlete. Representing the United States, she won gold in the 4 × 400 m relay at the 2019 World Championships, placed fourth in the 400 m, claimed the gold medal in the women's 4 × 400 m relay at the 2020 Tokyo Olympics, and secured a bronze medal in the 4 × 400 m mixed relay at the 2022 World Championships. In 2025, Wadeline switched her sporting allegiance from the United States to Haiti, her country of birth.

== Professional ==
Jonathas started a career in January 2020. In 2020, she achieved the world leading mark in the 400 meters, with a time of 51.32, set in the prelims of the Toyota USATF Indoor Championships. She ended up winning the final race in 51.54 seconds, and finished her indoor season undefeated in the 400 meters, with all her times under 52 seconds.

Representing Haiti, Venlogh won the 2025 NACAC Championships 400m silver medal.

=== Competition record ===
Year	Competition	Venue	Position	Event	Notes
Representing the United States
2022	World Athletics Championships	Eugene, Oregon	3rd	mixed 4 × 400 m relay	3:11.75
2021	Athletics at the 2020 Summer Olympics	Tokyo, Japan	11th	400 m	50.51
2021	Athletics at the 2020 Summer Olympics	Tokyo, Japan	1st	4 × 400 m	3:20.86 (p)
2019	World Championships	Doha, Qatar	4th	400 m	49.60
2019	World Championships	Doha, Qatar	1st	4 × 400 m	3:18.92
2019	The Match Europe v USA	Minsk, Belarus	1st	400 m	51.01
Representing Haiti
2025	NACAC Championships	Freeport, The Bahamas	2nd	400 m	50.23
2025	World Championships	Tokyo, Japan	15th (sf)	400 m	50.67

Year	Competition	Venue	Position	Event	Time
Representing Adidas
2022	USA Outdoor Track and Field Championships	Eugene, Oregon	4th place	400 m	50.84
2021	2020 United States Olympic Trials (track and field)	Eugene, Oregon	3rd place	400 m	50.03
2020	2020 USA Indoor Track and Field Championships	Albuquerque, New Mexico	1st place	400 m	51.54
Representing University of South Carolina
2019	2019 USA Outdoor Track and Field Championships	Des Moines, Iowa	3rd place	400 m	50.44

== NCAA ==
Jonathas enjoyed one of the best collegiate seasons in South Carolina Gamecocks track and field history in 2019. Jonathas claimed two NCAA Division I Track and field championships, in the indoor 4 × 400 meters, with a time of 3:30.76, and the outdoor 400 meters in 50.60 seconds. Jonathas proceeded to make the USATF roster for the 2019 IAAF World Championships and claimed 4th in the world in the 400 m with the fastest collegiate time in history at 49.60 and then won a gold medal with Team USA in the women's 4 × 400 m relay.

Jonathas won 2 titles (200 m, 400 m) at 2018 NCAA Division III Outdoor Track & Field Championships as a sophomore at UMass-Boston and finished 5th in long jump final. Jonathas won 4 titles (60 m, 200 m, 400 m, Long jump) at 2018 NCAA Division III Indoor Track & Field Championships as a sophomore at University of Massachusetts Boston.

Jonathas won 2 titles (200 m, 400 m) at 2017 NCAA Division III Outdoor Track & Field Championships as a freshman at UMass-Boston. Jonathas won her first National Collegiate Athletic Association title (400 m) while earning All-American honors in 200 metres and Long jump at 2017 NCAA Division III Indoor Track & Field Championships as a freshman at University of Massachusetts Boston.

== Prep ==
Jonathas is a 2016 alumna of Doherty Memorial High School in Worcester, Massachusetts. Jonathas placed 2nd at 2016 Massachusetts Interscholastic Athletic Association MIAA All State Track and field Championship in 400 m (55.81).
