= Kendall Ellis =

American sprinter (born 1996)

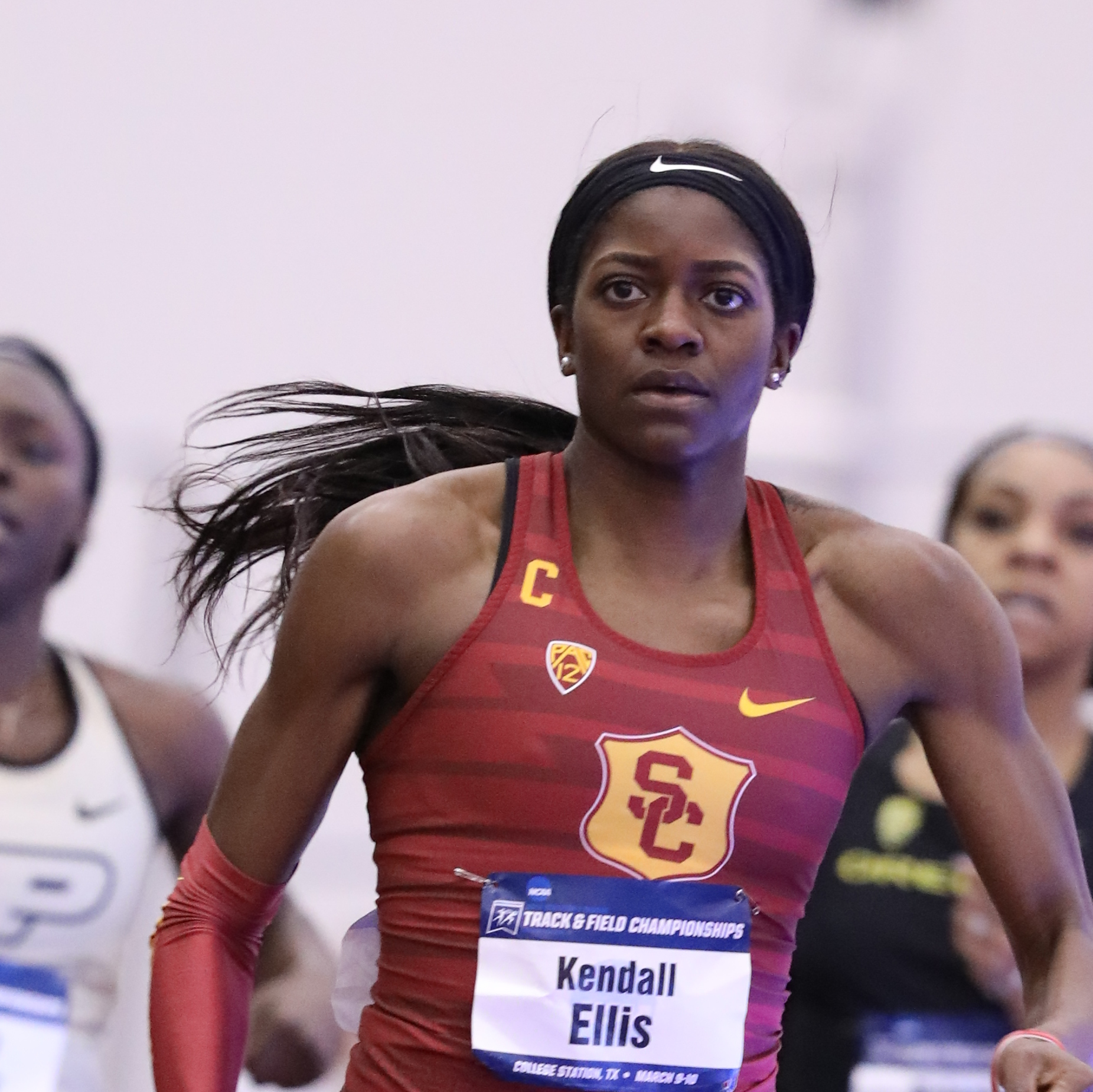
- Ellis in 2018

Personal information
- Born: March 8, 1996 (age 30) Pembroke Pines, Florida, United States
- Height: 1.72 m (5 ft 8 in)

Sport
- Sport: Track and field
- Event: 400 metres
- College team: USC Trojans
- Club: New Balance
- Turned pro: 2018

Achievements and titles
- Personal bests: 400 m: 49.46 (Eugene, OR 2024)
Medal record
Women's athletics
Representing the United States
Olympic Games
Gold medal – first place	2020 Tokyo	4 × 400 m relay
Bronze medal – third place	2020 Tokyo	4 × 400 m mixed
World Championships
Gold medal – first place	2017 London	4 × 400 m relay
Gold medal – first place	2019 Doha	4 × 400 m relay
World Athletics Relays
Gold medal – first place	2024 Nassau	4 × 400 m relay
Pan American U20 Championships
Gold medal – first place	2015 Edmonton	4 × 400 m relay
Bronze medal – third place	2015 Edmonton	400 m

Kendall Ellis (born March 8, 1996) is an American sprinter. Ellis won gold in the 4 × 400 m relay and bronze in the Mixed 4 × 400 metres at the Tokyo Olympics. She competed in the 400 meters at the 2017 and 2019 World Championships, winning gold medals as a part of prelim 4 × 400 m relays. As a junior, Ellis took gold in the 4 × 400 m relay and bronze in the 400 meters at the 2015 Pan American Junior Championships.

On June 10, 2018, she gained widespread distinction after her come from behind victory in the 1600 meter relay at the NCAA Track and Field Championships. She caught Purdue's Jaheya Mitchel at the finish line, giving University of Southern California the team event and its second women's track and field national title in program history. Ellis is a 3-time NCAA champion, 14-time NCAA Division I All-American, 7-time Pac-12 Conference champion and 5-time Mountain Pacific Sports Federation champion. Ellis set 2 NCAA indoor track and field records, a North American, Central American and Caribbean Athletic Association indoor 400 meters record and United States collegiate records in 400 m and 4 × 400 m relay.

== Career ==
Ellis is 2015 USA U20 Outdoor Track and Field women's 400 m Champion.

She competed at the 2015 Pan American Junior Athletics Championships and won gold in the 4 × 400 m relay and bronze in the 400 meters. Ellis competed in the women's 400 metres and won gold in the 2017 World Championships in Athletics – Women's 4 × 400 metres relay (participating in the heats) at the 2017 World Championships.

In January 2019, she was announced to sign with New Balance and won her professional debut later that week at New Balance Indoor Grand Prix.

Ellis competed in the women's 400 metres and won gold in the 4 × 400 m relay (participating in the heats) at the 2019 World Athletics Championships.

She placed 4th in the 400 m at the 2020 U.S. Olympic Trials with a time of 50.10 secs.

Ellis won gold in the 4 × 400 m relay and bronze in the Mixed 4 × 400 metres (participating in the heats) at the Tokyo Olympics.

== NCAA ==
Ellis is a 3-time NCAA champion, 14-time NCAA Division I All-American, 7-time Pac-12 Conference champion and 5-time Mountain Pacific Sports Federation champion. Ellis is the current North America, Central American and Caribbean record, American and Collegiate Record Holder for the indoor 400-meter dash with a time of 50.34 seconds.

Representing University of Southern California
School Year	MPSF Indoor Track	NCAA Indoor Track	Pac 12 Outdoor Track	NCAA Outdoor Track
2018 Senior	200 m – 23.36 – 1st		200 m – 22.74w (2.9) – 4th	
2018 Senior		400 m – 50.34 – 1st	400 m – 49.99 – 1st	400 m – 50.19 – 2nd
2018 Senior		4 × 400 m – 3:27.45 – 1st	4 × 400 m – 3:30.45 – 1st	4 × 400 3:27.06 1st
2018 Senior			4 × 100 m – 42.85 – 1st	4 × 100 m – 43.11 – 3rd
2017 Junior	200 m – 23.09 – 1st		200 m – 22.80 (1.5) – 4th	
2017 Junior		400 m – 51.07 – 2nd	400 m – 50.66 – 1st	400 m – 51.06 – 3rd
2017 Junior	4 × 400 m – 3:32.54 – 1st		4 × 400 m – 3:29.52 – 1st	4 × 400 m – 3:23.35 – 2nd
2016 Sophomore	400 m – 53.11 – 1st		400 m – 53.56 – 2nd	400 m – 52.59 – 11th
2016 Sophomore	400 m – 53.11 – 1st		200 m – 24.27 (−0.1) – 13th	
2016 Sophomore	400 m – 53.11 – 1st	4 × 400 m – 3:29.98 – 4th	4 × 400 3:34.14 1st	4 × 400 3:40.61 8th
2015 Freshman	400 m – 53.19 – 3rd		400 m – 52.88 – 5th	400 m – 54.45 – 24th
2015 Freshman	4 × 400 m – 3:33.58 – 1st	4 × 400 3:29.63 3rd	4 × 400 m – 3:32.12 – 1st	4 × 400 m – 3:29.97 – 2nd

== Early life and prep ==
Ellis grew up volunteering at the West Pembroke Pines Optimist Track Club.

Ellis works with children as a volunteer for Coaching Corps.

Ellis graduated from St. Thomas Aquinas High School (Florida) c/o 2014 as a 7-time FHSAA state champion with high school personal best times of 24.18 (200 meters) and 52.95 (400 meters).

Representing St. Thomas Aquinas High School (Florida)
Great Southwest Classic
2014	1st in the 400 m (53.49)
New Balance Outdoor Nationals
2011	15th in the 200 m (25.70)
Florida High School Athletic Association 4A state championship
Year	Outdoor Track
2014	1st in the 400 m (52.95)
2014	1st in the 4 × 400 m (3:41.01); Krystal Sparling, Diamond Spaulding, Narinah Jean-Baptiste, Kendall Ellis
2013	1st in the 400 m (54.96)
2013	1st in the 4 × 400 m (3:45.01); Alon Lewis, Kendall Ellis, Krystal Sparling, Toria Levy
2013	6th in the 200 m (24.45)
2012	1st in the 400 m (53.22)
2012	1st in the 4 × 400 m (3:47.67); Kendall Ellis, Kailn Houston, Toria Levy, Narinah Jean-Baptiste
2012	5th in the 200 m (24.93)
2011	1st in the 400 m (54.83)
2011	2nd in the 4 × 400 m (3:51.67); Allison Richmond, Toria Levy, Amanda Hercules, Kendall Ellis
2011	9th in the 200 m (24.88)

Ellis was St. Thomas Aquinas High School (Florida) teammates / relay partner with IAAF World U 18 and U 20 medalist Khalifa St. Fort.

In 2014, Ellis placed 1st in the 400 m (52.95) and 1st in the 4 × 400 m (3:41.01) at Florida High School Athletic Association 4A state meet.

In 2013, Ellis placed 1st in the 400 m (54.96), 6th in the 200 m (24.45) and 1st in the 4 × 400 m (3:45.01) at Florida High School Athletic Association 4A state meet.

In 2012, Ellis placed 1st in the 400 m (53.22), 5th in the 200 m (24.93) and 1st in the 4 × 400 m (3:47.67) at Florida High School Athletic Association 4A state meet.

In 2011, Ellis placed 1st in the 400 m (54.83), 9th in the 200 m (24.88) and 1st in the 4 × 400 m (3:51.67) at Florida High School Athletic Association 4A state meet.

== Statistics ==
=== Circuit performances ===
Grand Slam Track results
Slam	Race group	Event	Pl.	Time	Prize money
2025 Miami Slam	Long sprints	400 m	8th	52.51	US$10,000
2025 Miami Slam	Long sprints	200 m	8th	23.03	US$10,000

=== International championships ===
Year	Competition	Venue	Position	Event	Notes
Representing the United States
2024	Tokyo Olympics	Paris, France	9th	400 metres	50.40
2022	World Championships	Eugene, Oregon	30th	400 metres	52.55
2021	Tokyo Olympics	Tokyo; Japan	3rd	Mixed 4 × 400 metres	3:11.39
2021	Tokyo Olympics	Tokyo; Japan	1st	4 × 400 m relay	3:20.86
2019	World Championships	Khalifa International Stadium	1st	4 × 400 m relay	3:22.96
2019	World Championships	Khalifa International Stadium	14th	400 metres	51.58
2017	World Championships	London Stadium	1st	4 × 400 m relay	3:21.67
2017	World Championships	London Stadium	22nd	400 metres	52.18
Pan Am U20 Championships
2015	Pan American U20 Championships	Foote Field; Edmonton Alberta	3rd	400 metres	52.81
2015	Pan American U20 Championships	Foote Field; Edmonton Alberta	1st	4 × 400 m relay	3:31.49

=== National championships ===
Year	Competition	Venue	Position	Event	Notes
2024	Olympic Trials	Eugene, Oregon	1st	400 metres	49.46
2023	Outdoor Track and Field Championships	Eugene, Oregon	10th	400 metres	51.70
2022	Outdoor Track and Field Championships	Eugene, Oregon	2nd	400 metres	50.35
2021	Olympic Trials	Eugene, Oregon	4th	400 metres	50.10
2019	Outdoor Track and Field Championships	Drake University	2nd	400 metres	50.38
2018	Outdoor Track and Field Championships	Drake University	3rd	400 metres	50.37
2017	Outdoor Track and Field Championships	Sacramento State University	3rd	400 metres	50.00
2015	Junior Outdoor Track and Field Championships	University of Oregon	1st	400 metres	52.32
