= Roneisha McGregor =

Jamaican sprinter (born 1997)

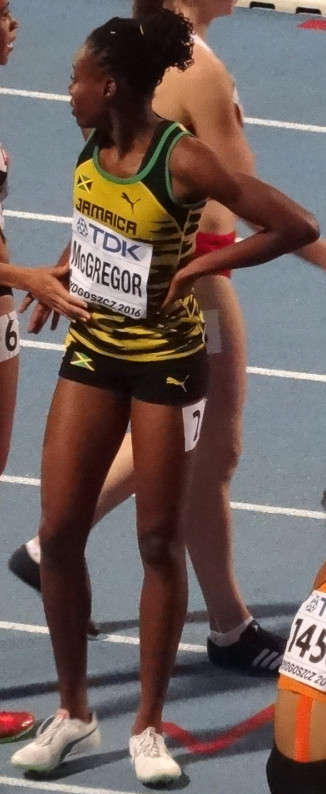
- McGregor in 2016

Personal information
- Nationality: Jamaican
- Born: 9 October 1997 (age 28)

Sport
- Country: Jamaica
- Sport: Athletics
- Event: Sprinting
Medal record
Representing Jamaica
Olympic Games
| Bronze medal – third place | 2020 Tokyo | 4 × 400 m relay |
World Championships
| Silver medal – second place | 2019 Doha | 4 × 400 m mixed |
| Silver medal – second place | 2025 Tokyo | 4 × 400 m relay |
| Bronze medal – third place | 2019 Doha | 4 × 400 m relay |
World Indoor Championships
| Gold medal – first place | 2022 Belgrade | 4 × 400 m relay |
Commonwealth Games
| Silver medal – second place | 2022 Birmingham | 4 × 400 m relay |
| Silver medal – second place | 2022 Birmingham | 4 × 100 m relay |
NACAC U23 Championships
| Gold medal – first place | 2019 Queretaro | 4 × 400 m mixed |
| Silver medal – second place | 2019 Queretaro | 400 m |
Pan American U20 Athletics Championships
| Silver medal – second place | 2015 Edmonton | 4 × 400 m relay |

Roneisha McGregor (born 9 October 1997) is a Jamaican sprinter. Competing in finals of 4 × 400 metres relays, she won a bronze medal in the women's relay at the 2020 Tokyo Olympics, and a silver in the mixed relay at the 2019 World Championships.

In June 2021, McGregor qualified to represent Jamaica at the Tokyo Games, running her 400 m best of 50.02 seconds for a third place at the Jamaican Athletics Championships. She reached the semi-final at Olympics in 50.34 s.

== Personal bests ==
- 100 metres – 11.35 (+0.4 m/s, Spanish Town, Jamaica 2021)
- 200 metres – 22.99 (Kingston, Jamaica 2021)
- 400 metres – 50.02 (Kingston, Jamaica 2021)
