= Wilbert London =

American sprinter (born 1997)

Personal information
- Full name: Wilbert London III
- Born: August 17, 1997 (age 28) Waco, Texas, U.S.

Sport
- Country: United States
- Sport: Track and field
- Event: 200 metres 400 metres

Achievements and titles
- Personal best: 400 m – 44.47 (2017)
Medal record
Men's track and field
Representing the United States
World Championships
Gold medal – first place	2019 Doha	4 × 400 m relay
Gold medal – first place	2019 Doha	4 × 400 m mixed
Silver medal – second place	2017 London	4 × 400 m relay
World Junior Championships
Silver medal – second place	2016 Bydgoszcz	400 m
Gold medal – first place	2016 Bydgoszcz	4 × 400 m relay
Pan American Games
Silver medal – second place	2019 Lima	4 × 400 m relay

Wilbert London III (born August 17, 1997) is an American track and field athlete specializing in sprinting events. Three-year track and field letterwinner at Waco High School. His 200 m personal best is 20.72 seconds at Austin, TX. His 400 m personal best is 44.47 seconds, which he ran at the 2017 USA Outdoor Track and Field Championships, where he placed third and advanced to the 2017 World Championships in London at the age of only 19.

At the 2016 IAAF World U20 Championships, London ran a time of 45.27 s in the 400 m to place 2nd. He also won a gold medal as a member of the 4 × 400 m relay team. The Following year he won a silver medal as a member on the 2017 IAAF World Championships 4 × 400 m team in London.

== Personal bests ==
Event	Time (sec)	Venue	Date
Outdoor events
200 metres	20.72	Austin, TX	April 13, 2018
400 metres	44.47	USA Outdoor Track and Field Championships	June 24, 2017
4 × 400 metres relay	2:58.61	2017 IAAF World Championships	August 13, 2017
Indoor events
400 metres	45.16	Birmingham, Alabama	March 9, 2019
