= Jasmine Blocker =

American sprinter (born 1992)

Personal information
- Nationality: American
- Born: June 9, 1992 (age 34)

Sport
- Country: United States
- Sport: Track and field
- Event: Sprinting
Medal record
World Championships
Gold medal – first place	2019 Doha	4 × 400 m mixed
World Relays
Gold medal – first place	2019 Yokohama	4 × 400 m mixed

Jasmine Blocker (born June 9, 1992) is an American athlete. She competed in the mixed 4 × 400 metres relay event at the 2019 World Athletics Championships, winning the gold medal.

Blocker ran for the Tulane Green Wave track and field team, earning All-American status in the 400 m at the 2016 NCAA Division I Outdoor Track and Field Championships.
