= Courtney Okolo =

American sprinter (born 1994)

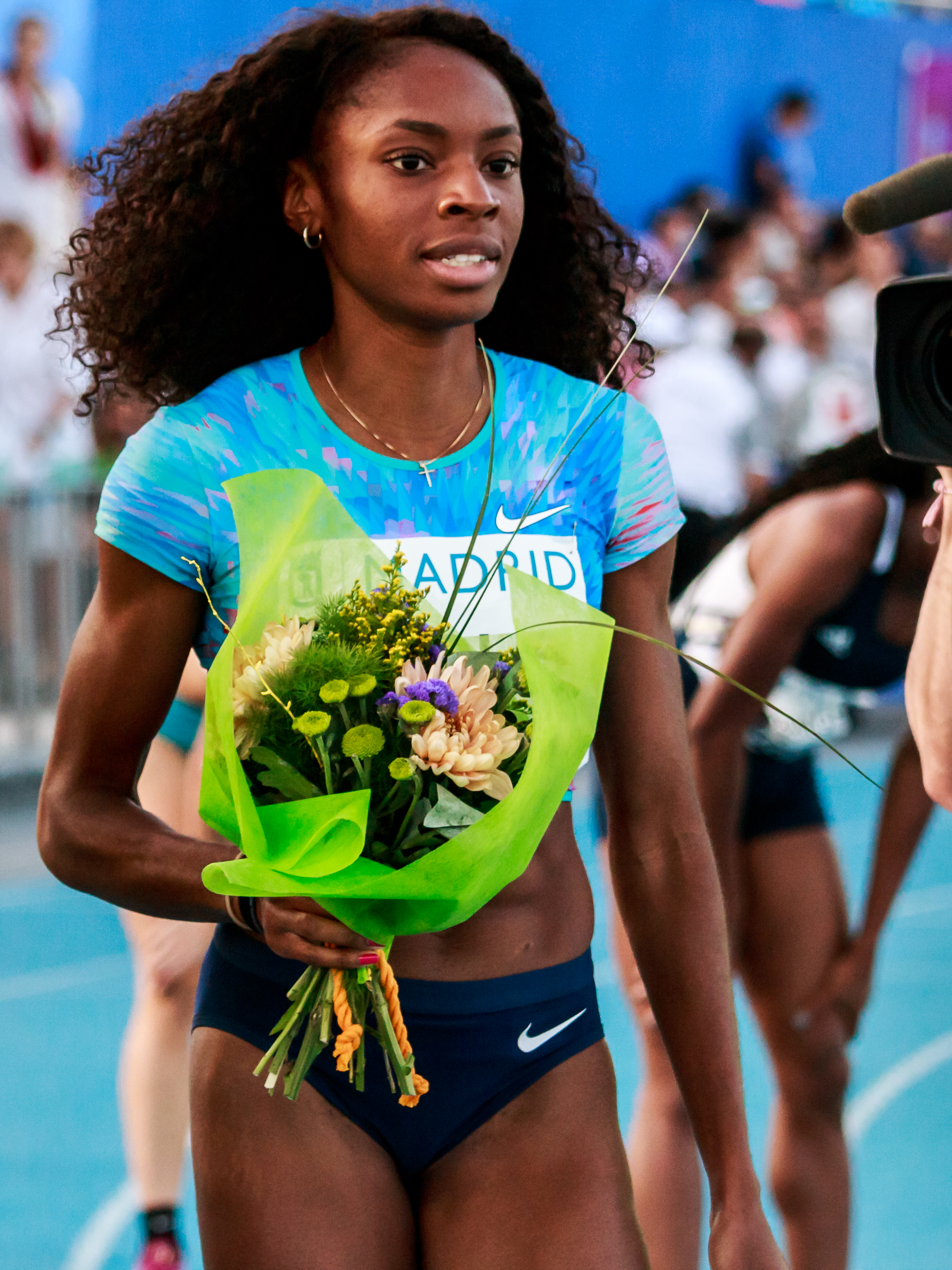
- Okolo in 2017

Personal information
- Born: March 15, 1994 (age 32) Dallas, Texas, U.S.
- Height: 5 ft 8 in (173 cm)
- Weight: 130 lb (59 kg)

Sport
- Country: United States
- Sport: Track and field
- Event: 400 metres
Medal record
Women's athletics
Representing the United States
Olympic Games
Gold medal – first place	2016 Rio de Janeiro	4 × 400 m relay
World Championships
Gold medal – first place	2019 Doha	4 × 400 m relay
Gold medal – first place	2019 Doha	4 × 400 m mixed
World Indoor Championships
Gold medal – first place	2016 Portland	4 × 400 m relay
Gold medal – first place	2018 Birmingham	400 m
Gold medal – first place	2018 Birmingham	4 × 400 m relay
World Relays
Gold medal – first place	2025 Guangzhou	4 × 400 m mixed
Pan American Games
Gold medal – first place	2019 Lima	4 × 400 m relay
Bronze medal – third place	2019 Lima	400 m
NACAC Championships
Gold medal – first place	2018 Toronto	4 × 400 m relay
Pan American Junior Championships
Gold medal – first place	2013 Medellín	4 × 400 m relay
Gold medal – first place	2013 Medellín	400 m

Courtney Okolo (born March 15, 1994) is an American track and field sprinter who usually competes in the 400 metres. She starred at Carrollton (Texas) Newman Smith High School where she won multiple individual state championships.

== Career ==
In college, she ran for the Texas Longhorns. She was fourth in the 400 m at the 2013 NCAA Outdoor Championships, and then the following year she completed an individual and relay double at the 2014 NCAA Outdoor Championships. She set a collegiate record in the 400 m that year when winning the Big 12 Outdoor Championships in 50.03 seconds. In April 2016, she broke her own collegiate record, running 49.71 seconds at the LSU Alumni Gold Meet. Okolo won consecutive titles in the women's 400 m and 4 × 400 m relay at the 2015 NCAA Indoor Championships. In 2016 Okolo won 400 m and 4 × 400 m relay titles in both the Indoor and 2016 NCAA Outdoor Championships. After the season ended, she was awarded the Bowerman Award. She also won the Honda Sports Award as the nation's best female track and field competitor in 2016.

Internationally she won both individual and relay events for the United States at the 2013 Pan American Junior Athletics Championships and the 2015 NACAC Championships in Athletics. More gold came in the 4 × 400 m relay at the 2016 IAAF World Indoor Championships and 2016 Olympic Games.

== Personal life ==
Okolo is of Nigerian descent through both her parents.

== Personal records ==
- 200-meter dash – 22.93 (2015)
- 400-meter dash – 49.71 (2016)

== International competitions ==
Year	Competition	Venue	Position	Event	Notes
2013	Pan American Junior Championships	Medellín, Colombia	1st	400 m	52.19
2013	Pan American Junior Championships	Medellín, Colombia	1st	4 × 400 m relay	3:36.48
2015	NACAC Championships	San José, Costa Rica	1st	400 m	51.57
2015	NACAC Championships	San José, Costa Rica	1st	4 × 400 m relay	3:25.39
2016	World Indoor Championships	Portland, United States	1st	4 × 400 m relay	3:26.38
2016	Olympic Games	Rio de Janeiro, Brazil	1st	4 × 400 m relay	3:19.06
2017	DécaNation	Angers, France	1st	200 m	23.41
2017	DécaNation	Angers, France	1st	400 m	51.96
2018	World Indoor Championships	Birmingham, United Kingdom	1st	400 m	50.55
2018	World Indoor Championships	Birmingham, United Kingdom	1st	4 × 400 m relay	3:23.85
2018	NACAC Championships	Toronto, Canada	4th	400 m	52.21
2018	NACAC Championships	Toronto, Canada	1st	4 × 400 m relay	3:26.08
2019	World Relays	Yokohama, Japan	2nd	4 × 400 m relay	3:27.65
2019	Pan American Games	Lima, Peru	3rd	400 m	51.22
2019	Pan American Games	Lima, Peru	1st	4 × 400 m relay	3:26.46
2019	World Championships	Doha, Qatar	1st (h)	4 × 400 m relay	3:22.96
2025	World Relays	Guangzhou, China	1st	4 × 400 m mixed	3:09.54

== National titles ==
- NCAA Division I Outdoor Championships
  - 400 m: 2014, 2016
  - 4 × 400 m relay: 2014, 2016
- NCAA Division I Indoor Championships
  - 400 m: 2015, 2016
  - 4 × 400 m relay: 2015, 2016

Awards
Preceded by Jenna Prandini	The Bowerman (women's winner); 2016	Succeeded by Raevyn Rogers
