= Obi Igbokwe =

American sprinter

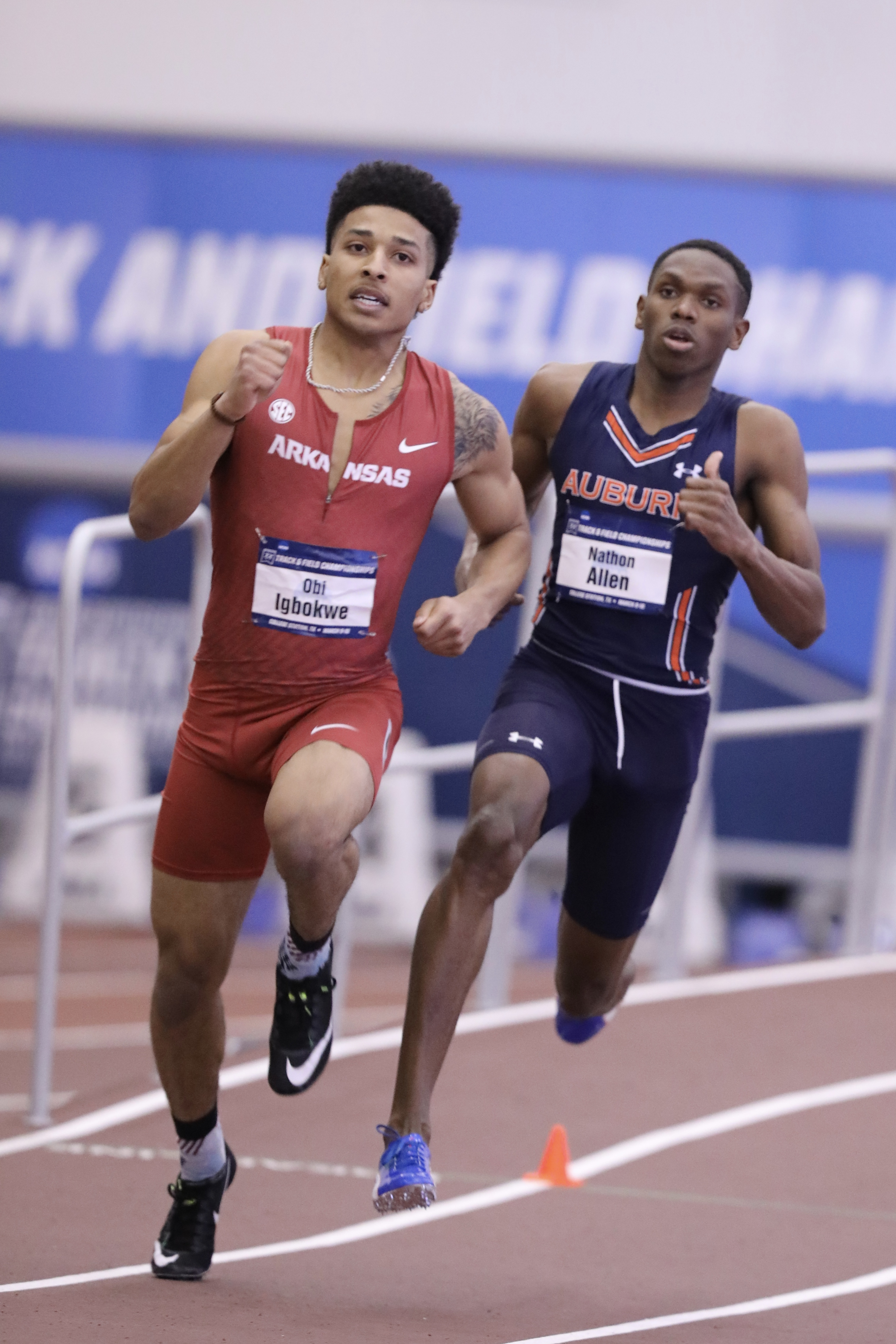
- Igbokwe (left) in 2018

Personal information
- Nationality: American
- Born: January 28, 1997 (age 29)

Sport
- Country: United States
- Sport: Track and field
- Event: Sprinting
- College team: Arkansas Razorbacks (2016-2018); Houston Cougars (2019)
- Turned pro: 2019
Medal record
World Championships
Gold medal – first place	2019 Doha	4 × 400 m mixed

Obichukwu Igbokwe (born January 28, 1997) is an American athlete. He competed in the mixed 4 × 400 metres relay event at the 2019 World Athletics Championships, winning the gold medal. Earlier in the season, running for the University of Houston he ran the second leg on what is recognized as the world record in the 4 × 400 meters relay, the team running a time of 3:01.51.

In 2021, Igbokwe received a 30-month suspension from USADA for testing positive for a metabolite of dehydrochlormethyltestosterone. He stated his ingestion of the substance was unintentional.
