= Jessica Beard =

American sprinter (born 1989)

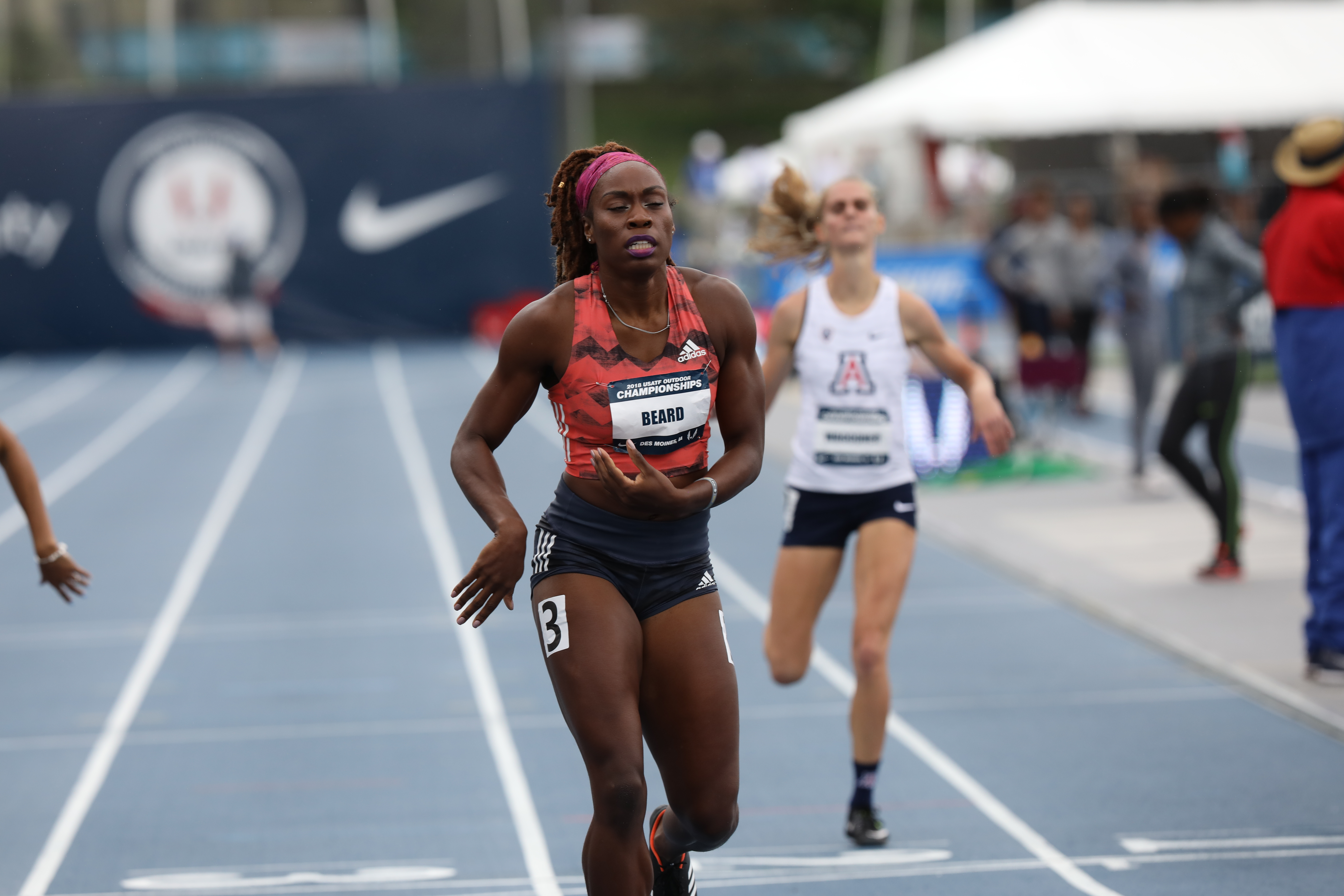

Personal information
- Born: January 8, 1989 (age 37) Euclid, Ohio, US

Sport
- Country: United States
- Sport: Track and field
- Event: Sprinting
Medal record
Women's track and field
Representing the United States
World Championships
Gold medal – first place	2009 Berlin	4 × 400 m relay
Gold medal – first place	2011 Daegu	4 × 400 m relay
Gold medal – first place	2013 Moscow	4 × 400 m relay
Gold medal – first place	2019 Doha	4 × 400 m relay
Gold medal – first place	2019 Doha	4 × 400 m mixed
Silver medal – second place	2015 Beijing	4 × 400 m relay
Pan American Junior
Gold medal – first place	2007 São Paulo	4 × 400 m relay
Bronze medal – third place	2007 São Paulo	400 m

Jessica Beard (born January 8, 1989) is an American sprinter who is a five-time world champion in the 4 × 400-meter relay. In the 400 m event, she earned a silver medal at the 2008 World Junior Championships, three gold medals at the USATF U20 Championships, and one NCAA title.

== High school and college ==
In high school, she was a four-year letter winner for the Euclid High School track and field squad. She was state champion in the 400 meters for four straight years setting a new Ohio state record in 2007. She decided to go to Texas A&M on a track scholarship the following year.

As a freshman, she got off to a fast start by placing fourth in the 400 meters at the NCAA Championships. Jessica also became the Big 12 Champion in the 400-meter dash, running her personal best time of 51.09 seconds and she was voted Big 12 freshman of the year.

During her second year, she continued her success winning both the indoor and outdoor Big 12 title in the 400 meters and finished second in the 400 m at the NCAA Championships. Jessica set a new school record with a time of 50.56 that year.

== Elite competition ==
Competing at the national level, in her 2009 track season Beard placed third in the 400 m at the USA Outdoor Track and Field Championships in Eugene, Oregon. That qualified her for the World Championships taking place in Berlin, Germany later that year. At the championships Beard placed 13th overall in the women's 400 m and took home the gold as part of the 4 × 400 m relay.

Awards
Preceded by (United States) Queen Harrison	The Bowerman (Women's Winner); 2011	Succeeded by (United States) Kimberlyn Duncan
