= Tyrell Richard =

American sprinter (born 1997)

Personal information
- Nationality: American
- Born: August 4, 1997 (age 28)

Sport
- Country: United States
- Sport: Track and field
- Event: Sprinting
- College team: South Carolina State Bulldogs
- Turned pro: 2019
Medal record
World Championships
Gold medal – first place	2019 Doha	4 × 400 m relay
Gold medal – first place	2019 Doha	4 × 400 m mixed

Tyrell Richard (born August 4, 1997) is an American athlete. He competed in the mixed 4 × 400 metres relay event at the 2019 World Athletics Championships, winning the gold medal.

As a senior at South Carolina State in 2019, Richard won the men's 400-metre title at the 2019 NCAA Division I Indoor Track and Field Championships with a time of 44.82 seconds, which set a new school and MEAC record.

== Personal life ==
He has two brothers who played football at SC State: Donovan set the school career tackles record before playing on the Jacksonville Jaguars practice squad and Tevin set the school record for blocked kicks in a season.
