= Eritrea at the 2017 World Championships in Athletics =

- WA code: ERI

in London
- Competitors: 8 in 4 events
- Medals: Gold 0 Silver 0 Bronze 0 Total 0

World Championships in Athletics appearances
- 1997; 1999; 2001; 2003; 2005; 2007; 2009; 2011; 2013; 2015; 2017; 2019; 2022; 2023

Eritrea competed at the 2017 World Championships in Athletics in London, United Kingdom, from 4 to 13 August 2017.

== Results ==
(q – qualified, NM – no mark, SB – season best)

=== Men ===
Track and road events

Athlete	Event	Heat		Final	
Athlete	Event	Result	Rank	Result	Rank
Awet Habte	5000 metres	13:27.70	10 q	13:58.68	14
Aron Kifle	5000 metres	13:30.36	18 Q	13:36.91	7
Nguse Amlosom	10,000 metres	—		DNF	–
Aron Kifle	10,000 metres	—		27:09.92	11
Hiskel Tewelde	10,000 metres	—		27:49.62 SB	17
Yohanes Ghebregergis	Marathon	—		2:12.07	7
Ghebrezgiabhier Kibrom	Marathon	—		2:21.22	41
Amanuel Mesel	Marathon	—		DNF	–
Yemane Haileselassie	3000 metres steeplechase	8:35.73	28	Did not advance	
