= Eritrea at the 2022 World Athletics Championships =

- Flag of Eritrea
- WA code: ERI

in Eugene, United States 15 July 2022 – 24 July 2022
- Competitors: 10 (7 men and 3 women)
- Medals: Gold 0 Silver 0 Bronze 0 Total 0

World Athletics Championships appearances
- 1997; 1999; 2001; 2003; 2005; 2007; 2009; 2011; 2013; 2015; 2017; 2019; 2022; 2023; 2025

Eritrea competed at the 2022 World Athletics Championships in Eugene, United States, from 15 to 24 July 2022.

== Results ==
Eritrea entered 10 athletes.

Key

- Q = Qualified for the next round
- q = Qualified for the next round as a fastest loser or, in field events, by position without achieving the qualifying target
- NR = National record
- PB = Personal best
- SB = Season best
- N/A = Round not applicable for the event

=== Men ===
Track and road events

Athlete	Event	Heat		Final	
Athlete	Event	Result	Rank	Result	Rank
Merhawi Mebrahtu	5000 m	13:24.89	17	did not advance	
Habtom Samuel	10,000 m	—		28:01.81	17
Yemane Haileselassie	3000 m steeplechase	8:18.75 SB	8 q	8:29.40	7
Goitom Kifle	Marathon	—		2:11:10 SB	22
Oqbe Kibrom Ruesom	Marathon	—		2:09:02	16
Hiskel Tewelde	Marathon	—		2:15:01 SB	44

=== Women ===
Track and road events

Athlete	Event	Heat		Final	
Athlete	Event	Result	Rank	Result	Rank
Rahel Daniel	5000 m	15:31.03	24	did not advance	
Rahel Daniel	10000 m	—		30:12.15 NR	5
Dolshi Tesfu	10000 m	—		31:49.29 SB	18
Nazret Weldu	Marathon	—		2:20:29 NR	4
