= 2017 World Championships in Athletics – Men's 10,000 metres =

Men's 10,000 metres at the 2017 World Championships
- Venue: Olympic Stadium
- Dates: 4 August
- Competitors: 24 from 14 nations
- Winning time: 26:49.51 WL

Medalists
gold medal	Mo Farah	Great Britain
silver medal	Joshua Cheptegei	Uganda
bronze medal	Paul Tanui	Kenya

Video on YouTube Official Video

The men's 10,000 metres at the 2017 World Championships in Athletics was held at the London Olympic Stadium on 4 August. This was billed to be the final 10,000 metres race of two-time champion Mo Farah. Farah won the race, ahead of Joshua Cheptegei from Uganda with Paul Tanui of Kenya finishing third. The win was Farah's third consecutive World 10,000 metres title, and his fifth consecutive major (Olympic or world) 10,000 metres title.

== Summary ==
Joshua Cheptegei, Geoffrey Kipsang Kamworor and Moses Kurong formed an early breakaway, Kurong taking the lead for a few laps before Cheptegei went back to the front, and nine laps into the race, Kamworor, and then Paul Tanui, took the lead. By 6,000 metres, there was a lead group of 14 runners at the front, but this group gradually got smaller. Farah hit the front just before four laps to go. He let Abadi Hadis resume the lead, and at one point Kamworor had his heels caught by Farah as he cut across in front. Just before two laps to go, Farah went back into the lead.

During the penultimate turn, Tanui clipped the back of Farah's heels causing him to briefly lose his stride. Tanui sprinted through the final turn trying to get even with Farah at the head of the final straight. Farah turned to look at him, then accelerated away, already celebrating his win with ten metres remaining. Cheptegei sprinted around Tanui, but could not catch Farah and took second.

== Records ==
Before the competition records were as follows:

Record	Perf.	Athlete	Nat.	Date	Location
World	26:17.53	Kenenisa Bekele	ETH	26 Aug 2005	Brussels, Belgium
Championship	26:46.31	Kenenisa Bekele	ETH	17 Aug 2009	Berlin, Germany
World leading	27:08.26	Abadi Hadis	ETH	11 Jun 2017	Hengelo, Netherlands
African	26:17.53	Kenenisa Bekele	ETH	26 Aug 2005	Brussels, Belgium
Asian	26:38.76	Ahmad Hassan Abdullah	QAT	5 Sep 2003	Brussels, Belgium
NACAC	26:44.36	Galen Rupp	USA	30 May 2014	Eugene, United States
South American	27:28.12	Marilson dos Santos	BRA	2 Jun 2007	Neerpelt, Belgium
European	26:46.57	Mo Farah	GBR	3 Jun 2011	Eugene, United States
Oceanian	27:24.95	Ben St Lawrence	AUS	1 May 2011	Palo Alto, United States

The following records were set at the competition:

Record	Perf.	Athlete	Nat.	Date
World leading	26:49.51	Mo Farah	GBR	4 Aug 2017
Canadian	27:02.35	Mohammed Ahmed	CAN	4 Aug 2017
Bahraini	27:11.08	Abraham Cheroben	BHR	4 Aug 2017

== Qualification standard ==
The standard to qualify automatically for entry was 27:45.00.

== Results ==
The final took place on 4 August at 21:20. The results were as follows (photo finish):

Rank	Name	Nationality	Time	Notes
1st place, gold medalist(s)	Mo Farah	Great Britain & N.I.	26:49.51	WL
2nd place, silver medalist(s)	Joshua Cheptegei	Uganda	26:49.94	PB
3rd place, bronze medalist(s)	Paul Tanui	Kenya	26:50.60	SB
4	Bedan Karoki Muchiri	Kenya	26:52.12	PB
5	Jemal Yimer	Ethiopia	26:56.11	PB
6	Geoffrey Kipsang Kamworor	Kenya	26:57.77	SB
7	Abadi Hadis	Ethiopia	26:59.19	SB
8	Mohammed Ahmed	Canada	27:02.35	NR
9	Shadrack Kipchirchir	United States	27:07.55	PB
10	Andamlak Belihu	Ethiopia	27:08.94	PB
11	Aron Kifle	Eritrea	27:09.92	PB
12	Abraham Cheroben	Bahrain	27:11.08	NR
13	Leonard Korir	United States	27:20.18	PB
14	Timothy Toroitich	Uganda	27:21.09	PB
15	Hassan Mead	United States	27:32.49	PB
16	Zane Robertson	New Zealand	27:48.59	SB
17	Hiskel Tewelde	Eritrea	27:49.62	SB
18	Moses Kurong	Uganda	27:50.71	
19	Onesphore Nzikwinkunda	Burundi	28:09.98	PB
20	Stephen Mokoka	South Africa	28:14.67	SB
21	Bayron Piedra	Ecuador	28:50.72	SB
22	Patrick Tiernan	Australia	29:23.72	
	Nguse Amlosom	Eritrea	DNF	
	Polat Kemboi Arıkan	Turkey	DNF	
