= Kenya at the 2017 World Championships in Athletics =

- WA code: KEN
- Website: www.athleticskenya.or.ke

in London
- Competitors: 50 in 20 events
- Medals Ranked 2th: Gold 5 Silver 2 Bronze 4 Total 11

World Championships in Athletics appearances (overview)
- 1983; 1987; 1991; 1993; 1995; 1997; 1999; 2001; 2003; 2005; 2007; 2009; 2011; 2013; 2015; 2017; 2019; 2022; 2023; 2025

Kenya competed at the 2017 World Championships in Athletics in London, United Kingdom, from 4–13 August 2017.

== Medalists ==
Medal	Athlete	Event	Date
Gold	Geoffrey Kirui	Men's marathon	August 6
Gold	Faith Kipyegon	Women's 1500 metres	August 7
Gold	Conseslus Kipruto	Men's steeplechase	August 8
Gold	Hellen Obiri	Women's 5000 metres	August 13
Gold	Elijah Manangoi	Men's 1500 metres	August 13
Silver	Edna Kiplagat	Women's marathon	August 6
Silver	Timothy Cheruiyot	Men's 1500 metres	August 13
Bronze	Paul Tanui	Men's 10,000 metres	August 4
Bronze	Agnes Tirop	Women's 10,000 metres	August 5
Bronze	Kipyegon Bett	Men's 800 metres	August 8
Bronze	Hyvin Jepkemoi	Women's steeplechase	August 11

== Results ==
(q – qualified, NM – no mark, SB – season best)

=== Men ===
Track and road events

Athlete	Event	Preliminaries		Heat		Semifinal		Final	
Athlete	Event	Result	Rank	Result	Rank	Result	Rank	Result	Rank
Mark Odhiambo	100 metres	10.40	10 Q	10.37	36	Did not advance			
Mark Odhiambo	200 metres	—N/a		20.74	32	Did not advance			
Collins Omae Gichana	400 metres	—N/a		46.10	37	Did not advance			
Raymond Kibet	400 metres	—N/a		45.35	25	Did not advance			
Boniface Mweresa	400 metres	—N/a		45.58	20 q	45.93	22	Did not advance	
Kipyegon Bett	800 metres	—N/a		1:45.76	4 Q	1:45.02	1 Q	1.45.21	3rd place, bronze medalist(s)
Emmanuel Korir	800 metres	—N/a		1:47.08	24 Q	1:46.08	8	Did not advance	
Ferguson Rotich	800 metres	—N/a		1:45.77	6 Q	1:46.49	15	Did not advance	
Michael Loturomom Saruni	800 metres	—N/a		DNS	–	Did not advance			
Timothy Cheruiyot	1500 metres	—N/a		3:38.41	2 Q	3:38.14	2 Q	3:33.99	2nd place, silver medalist(s)
Asbel Kiprop	1500 metres	—N/a		3:45.96	25 Q	3:40.14	13 Q	3:37.24	9
Ronald Kwemoi	1500 metres	—N/a		3:43.10	18 q	3:39.47	9	Did not advance	
Elijah Manangoi	1500 metres	—N/a		3:45.93	24 Q	3:40.10	12 Q	3:33.61	1st place, gold medalist(s)
Davis Kiplangat	5000 metres	—N/a		14:52.98	37	—N/a		Did not advance	
Josphat Kiprono Menjo	5000 metres	—N/a		13:35.68	30	—N/a		Did not advance	
Cyrus Rutto	5000 metres	—N/a		13:22.45	3 Q	—N/a		13:48.64	13
Geoffrey Kipsang Kamworor	10,000 metres	—N/a						26:57.77 SB	6
Bedan Karoki Muchiri	10,000 metres	—N/a						26:52.12 PB	4
Paul Tanui	10,000 metres	—N/a						26:50.60 SB	3rd place, bronze medalist(s)
Gideon Kipketer	Marathon	—N/a						2:10:56	6
Geoffrey Kirui	Marathon	—N/a						2:08:27	1st place, gold medalist(s)
Daniel Wanjiru	Marathon	—N/a						2:12:16	8
Aron Koech	400 metres hurdles	—N/a		49.55	11 Q	50.40	18	Did not advance	
Jairus Birech	3000 metres steeplechase	—N/a		8:23.84	11 q	—N/a		8:32.90	12
Ezekiel Kemboi	3000 metres steeplechase	—N/a		8:20.61	4 q	—N/a		8:29.38	11
Brimin Kipruto	3000 metres steeplechase	—N/a		8:33.33	23	—N/a		Did not advance	
Conseslus Kipruto	3000 metres steeplechase	—N/a		8:23.80	10 Q	—N/a		8:14.12	1st place, gold medalist(s)
Samuel Gathimba	20 kilometres walk	—N/a						1:22:52 SB	30
Simon Wachira	20 kilometres walk	—N/a						DNF	–

Field events

Athlete	Event	Qualification		Final	
Athlete	Event	Distance	Position	Distance	Position
Julius Yego	Javelin throw	83.57	12 Q	76.29	13

=== Women ===
Track and road events

Athlete	Event	Heat		Semifinal		Final	
Athlete	Event	Result	Rank	Result	Rank	Result	Rank
Maximila Imali	400 metres	53.97	46	Did not advance			
Eunice Jepkoech Sum	800 metres	DNS	–	Did not advance			
Emily Cherotich Tuei	800 metres	2:02.70	30	Did not advance			
Margaret Nyairera Wambui	800 metres	2:00.75	6 Q	2:01.19	17 Q	1:57.54	4
Winny Chebet	1500 metres	4:03.19	4 Q	4:06.29	15	Did not advance	
Faith Chepngetich Kipyegon	1500 metres	4:03.09	3 Q	4:03.54	1 Q	4:02.59	1st place, gold medalist(s)
Judy Kiyeng	1500 metres	4:13.65	39	Did not advance			
Margaret Chelimo Kipkemboi	5000 metres	15:00.39	12 Q	—N/a		14:48.74	5
Sheila Chepkirui Kiprotich	5000 metres	14:57.58 PB	6 q	—N/a		14:54.05 PB	7
Hellen Obiri	5000 metres	14:56.70	1 Q	—N/a		14:34.86	1st place, gold medalist(s)
Irene Chepet Cheptai	10,000 metres	—N/a				31:21.11 SB	7
Alice Aprot Nawowuna	10,000 metres	—N/a				31:11.86 SB	4
Agnes Jebet Tirop	10,000 metres	—N/a				31:03.50 PB	3rd place, bronze medalist(s)
Flomena Cheyech Daniel	Marathon	—N/a				2:27:21 SB	4
Edna Ngeringwony Kiplagat	Marathon	—N/a				2:27:18 SB	2nd place, silver medalist(s)
Helah Jelagat Kiprop	Marathon	—N/a				2:28:19	7
Beatrice Chepkoech	3000 metres steeplechase	9:19.03	1 Q	—N/a		9:10.45	4
Celliphine Chepteek Chespol	3000 metres steeplechase	9:27.35	5 Q	—N/a		9:15.04	6
Hyvin Jepkemoi	3000 metres steeplechase	9:39.89	16 Q	—N/a		9:04.03	3rd place, bronze medalist(s)
Purity Cherotich Kirui	3000 metres steeplechase	9:40.53	17 Q	—N/a		9:25.62	10
Grace Wanjiru Njue	20 kilometres walk	—N/a				1:35:22	37
