= 2015 World Youth Championships in Athletics – Boys' 10,000 metres walk =

Boys' 10,000 metres walk at the 2015 World Youth Championships in Athletics
- Venue: Estadio Olímpico Pascual Guerrero
- Dates: 18 July
- Competitors: 41 from 27 nations
- Winning time: 42:24.41

Medalists
gold medal	Sergey Shirobokov	Russia
silver medal	Zhang Jun	China
bronze medal	Federico González	Mexico

The boys' 10,000 metres walk at the 2015 World Youth Championships in Athletics was held at the Estadio Olímpico Pascual Guerrero in Cali, Colombia on 18 July 2015.

== Records ==
Prior to the competition, the following records were as follows.

World Youth Best	Chen Ding (CHN)	39:47.20	Bydgoszcz, Poland	11 July 2008
Championship Record	Pavel Parshin (RUS)	40:51.31	Lille, France	9 July 2011
World Youth Leading	Zakhar Sliva (RUS)	41:52.62	Cheboksary, Russia	12 June 2015

== Results ==
Rank	Name	Nationality	Time	Note
1st place, gold medalist(s)	Sergey Shirobokov	Russia	42:24.41	
2nd place, silver medalist(s)	Zhang Jun	China	42:33.68	PB
3rd place, bronze medalist(s)	Federico González	Mexico	42:54.55	
4	Andrés Olivas	Mexico	43:27.70	PB
5	Toshiki Ueda	Japan	43:34.83	PB
6	César Herrera	Colombia	44:01.87	PB
7	Ariel Cayllante	Bolivia	44:29.25	
8	Song Yun-hwa	South Korea	44:36.11	PB
9	Giacomo Brandi	Italy	44:48.39	
10	Zakhar Sliva	Russia	45:22.02	
11	Zhou Xiaojun	China	45:22.80	PB
12	Juan Jiménez	Colombia	45:48.57	PB
13	Jhonatan Amores	Ecuador	45:57.39	PB
14	Matheus Corrêa	Brazil	46:13.23	
15	Yohanis Algaw	Ethiopia	46:14.27	
16	Eduard Zabuzhenko	Ukraine	46:15.49	
17	David Hurtado	Ecuador	46:16.23	SB
18	Yasushi Morita	Japan	46:31.43	PB
19	Said Touche	Algeria	46:39.86	
20	Carlos Tur	Spain	46:59.16	PB
21	Eknath Sambhaji Turambekar	India	47:16.46	
22	Gemechu Birtu	Ethiopia	47:16.68	SB
23	Gerson Navas	El Salvador	47:21.23	
24	Kevin Cerro	Spain	47:22.23	PB
25	Frank Hernández	El Salvador	47:22.54	
26	Jorge Cruz	Puerto Rico	47:22.71	
27	La Kyeon-gmin	South Korea	47:27.62	PB
28	Baha Eddine Gatri	Tunisia	47:28.23	
29	Daumantas Liutinskis	Lithuania	47:38.87	PB
30	Stanislav Mashtal	Ukraine	48:37.71	
31	Arnold Riveros	Peru	49:25.98	
32	Yhojan Melillán	Chile	50:08.70	
33	Kyle Swan	Australia	50:42.45	
–	Abdülaziz Daniş	Turkey	DNF	
–	Arkadiusz Drozdowicz	Poland	DNF	
–	Tyler Jones	Australia	DNF	
–	Alger Liang	Canada	DNF	
–	Selim Seven	Turkey	DNF	
–	Yeóryios Tzatzimákis	Greece	DNF	
–	Pierre Vermaak	South Africa	DNF	
–	Victor Arque	Peru	DQ	
