= 2017 World Championships in Athletics =

Athletics competition in London, England

IAAF World Championships London 2017
- Host city: London
- Country: England
- Organizers: IAAF, UK Athletics
- Edition: 16th
- Nations: 205
- Athletes: 2038 (1080 men, 958 women)
- Sport: Athletics
- Events: 48 (24 men, 24 women)
- Dates: 4–13 August 2017
- Opened by: Queen Elizabeth II
- Closed by: IAAF President Sebastian Coe
- Main venue: London Stadium

The 2017 IAAF World Championships, the sixteenth edition of the IAAF World Championships, were held from 4 to 13 August at London Stadium in London, England. London was officially awarded the championships on 11 November 2011.

== Bidding process ==
When the seeking deadline passed on 1 September 2011, two candidate cities (London and Doha) had confirmed their candidatures. Barcelona, which investigated a bid, withdrew citing a lack of support from the local population and financial difficulties.

On 5 September 2011, Doha launched its marketing bid for the 2017 World Championships. The slogan of the bid was "The RIGHT PARTNER for a stronger World Championships." The bid was led by Abdullah Al Zaini and Aphrodite Moschoudi. Moschoudi successfully led Qatar's bid for the 2015 Handball World Championships. Doha also brought in Brian Roe, a member of the IAAF Technical Committee. The bid was for the championships to be held in the renovated, climate-controlled Khalifa Stadium. The Corniche promenade was to hold the road races, with the committee proposing to hold the marathon at night after the opening ceremony.

On 6 September 2011, London unveiled its bid for the 2017 championships with the slogan "Ready to break records." This was London's fourth bid in less than 15 years to host the event. The London bid team said that if their bid was successful they would introduce the "Women in World Athletics" programme.

The IAAF Evaluation Commission visited London on 2–4 October and Doha on 4–6 October. On 11 November 2011, the winner was officially announced as London.

== Venue ==
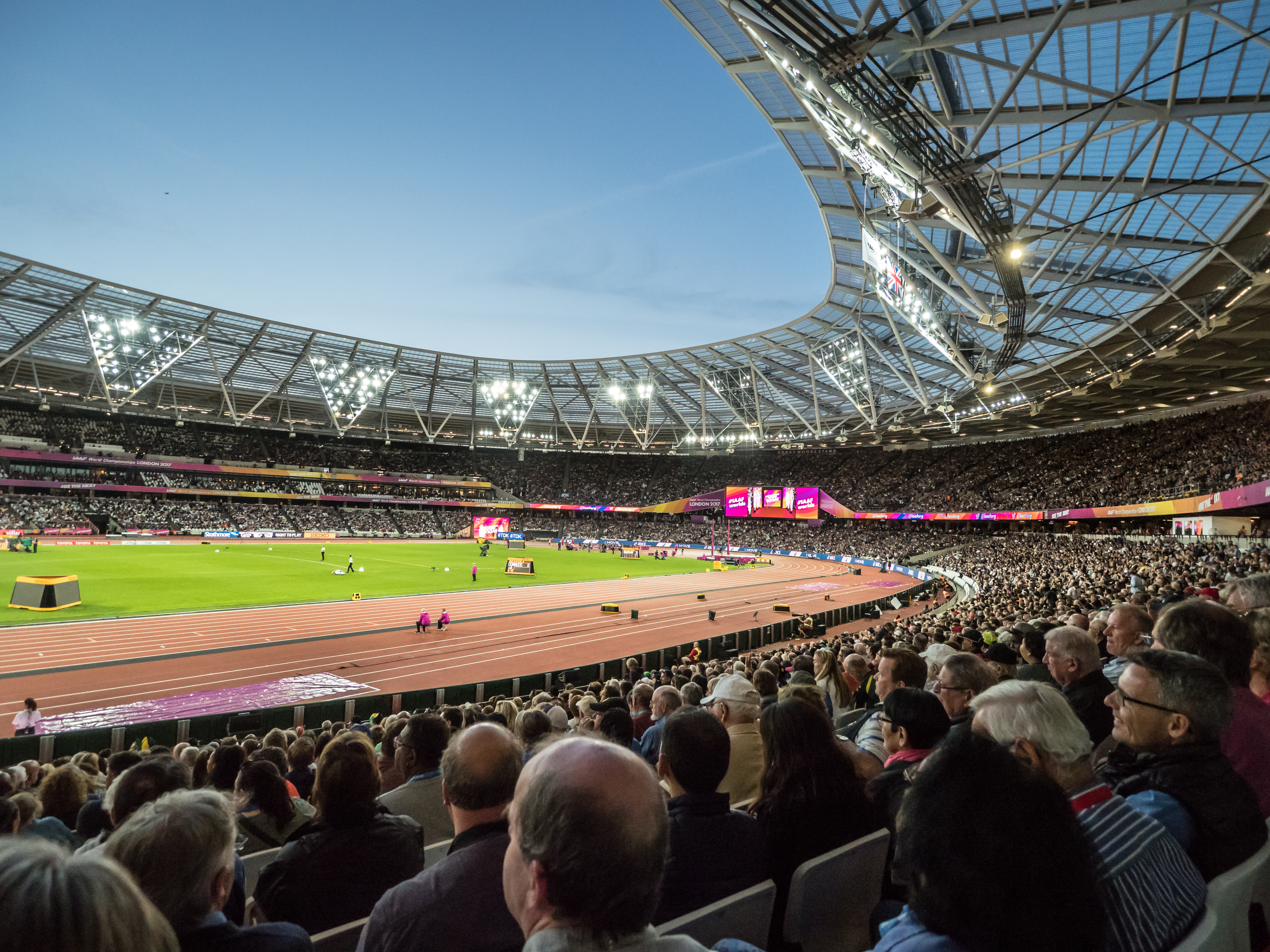
The London Stadium during the championships. Big crowds were a constant, with all evening sessions being sell-outs

The championships were held in the London Stadium in Stratford, London, which hosted the athletics events and the opening and closing ceremonies of the 2012 Summer Olympics, and has a capacity of 60,000.

Six days before the events were due to begin, it was reported that more than 660,000 tickets had been sold, which was a record for the World Championships, surpassing the previous record of 417,156 tickets sold for Berlin 2009.

== Media coverage ==
Rights to televise the championships in the United Kingdom were held by the BBC. NBCUniversal was the rights holder in the United States. In Canada, rights to televise the championships belonged to the Canadian Broadcasting Corporation.

== Mascot ==
The mascots for the IAAF Championships and World ParaAthletics Championships were unveiled in April 2017, and chosen through a children's design contest organised by the BBC programme Blue Peter. The mascots represent "everyday" endangered species of the UK; the IAAF Championships mascot is an anthropomorphic hedgehog named Hero the Hedgehog, and for the ParaAthletics, Whizbee the Bee.

== Entry standards ==
The qualification period for the 10,000 metres, marathon, race walks, relays, and combined events runs from 1 January 2016 to 23 July 2017. For all other events, the qualification period runs from 1 October 2016 to 23 July 2017.

Event	Men	Women
100 metres	10.12	11.26
200 metres	20.44	23.10
400 metres	45.50	52.10
800 metres	1:45.90	2:01.00
1500 metres (mile)	3:36.00 (3:53.40)	4:07.50 (4:26.70)
3000 metres steeplechase	8:32.00	9:42.00
5000 metres	13:22.60	15:22.00
10,000 metres	27:45.00	32:15.00
110/100 metre hurdles	13.48	12.98
400 metres hurdles	49.35	56.10
High jump	2.30 m	1.94 m
Pole vault	5.70 m	4.55 m
Long jump	8.15 m	6.75 m
Triple jump	16.80 m	14.10 m
Shot put	20.50 m	17.75 m
Discus throw	65.00 m	61.20 m
Hammer throw	76.00 m	71.00 m
Javelin throw	83.00 m	61.40 m
Marathon	2:19:00	2:45:00
Decathlon/Heptathlon	8100	6200
20 kilometres race walk	1:24:00	1:36:00
50 kilometres race walk	4:06:00	4:30:00

== Event schedule ==
The Women's 50 kilometres walk was held for the first time.

All dates are BST (UTC+1)

P	Preliminary Round	Q	Qualification	H	Heats	S	Semi-final	F	Final

Event		4 Aug	5 Aug		6 Aug		7 Aug	8 Aug	9 Aug	10 Aug	11 Aug		12 Aug		13 Aug	
Event		A	M	A	M	A	A	A	A	A	M	A	M	A	M	A
Men	100 m	P		S												
Men	100 m	H		F												
Men	200 m						H		S	F						
Men	400 m		H			S		F								
Men	800 m		H			S		F								
Men	1500 m									H		S				F
Men	5000 m								H					F		
Men	10,000 m	F														
Men	Marathon				F											
Men	3000 m steeplechase				H			F								
Men	110 m hurdles				H	S	F									
Men	400 m hurdles				H		S		F							
Men	Decathlon										F	F	F	F		
Men	High jump										Q					F
Men	Pole vault				Q			F								
Men	Long jump	Q		F												
Men	Triple jump						Q			F						
Men	Shot put		Q			F										
Men	Discus throw	Q		F												
Men	Hammer throw								Q			F				
Men	Javelin throw									Q				F		
Men	20 km walk														F	
Men	50 km walk														F	
Men	4 × 100 m relay												H	F		
Men	4 × 400 m relay												H			F
Women	100 m		H			S										
Women	100 m		H			F										
Women	200 m							H		S		F				
Women	400 m				H		S		F							
Women	800 m									H		S				F
Women	1500 m	H		S			F									
Women	5000 m									H						F
Women	10,000 m			F												
Women	Marathon				F											
Women	3000 m steeplechase								H			F				
Women	100 m hurdles										H	S		F		
Women	400 m hurdles						H	S		F						
Women	Heptathlon		F	F	F	F										
Women	High jump									Q				F		
Women	Pole vault	Q				F										
Women	Long jump								Q			F				
Women	Triple jump		Q				F									
Women	Shot put							Q	F							
Women	Discus throw										Q					F
Women	Hammer throw		Q				F									
Women	Javelin throw					Q		F								
Women	20 km walk														F	
Women	50 km walk														F	
Women	4 × 100 m relay												H	F		
Women	4 × 400 m relay												H			F

== Event summary ==
=== Men ===
==== Track ====
Chronology: 2013 | 2015 | 2017 | 2019 | 2021

Event	Gold		Silver		Bronze	
100 metres	Justin Gatlin; United States (USA)	9.92 SB, WMR	Christian Coleman; United States (USA)	9.94	Usain Bolt; Jamaica (JAM)	9.95 SB
200 metres	Ramil Guliyev; Turkey (TUR)	20.09	Wayde van Niekerk; South Africa (RSA)	20.11	Jereem Richards; Trinidad and Tobago (TTO)	20.11
400 metres	Wayde van Niekerk; South Africa (RSA)	43.98	Steven Gardiner; Bahamas (BAH)	44.41	Abdalelah Haroun; Qatar (QAT)	44.48 SB
800 metres	Pierre-Ambroise Bosse; France (FRA)	1:44.67 SB	Adam Kszczot; Poland (POL)	1:44.95 SB	Kipyegon Bett; Kenya (KEN)	1:45.21
1500 metres	Elijah Manangoi; Kenya (KEN)	3:33.61	Timothy Cheruiyot; Kenya (KEN)	3:33.99	Filip Ingebrigtsen; Norway (NOR)	3:34.53
5000 metres	Muktar Edris; Ethiopia (ETH)	13:32.79	Mo Farah; Great Britain & N.I. (GBR)	13:33.22	Paul Chelimo; United States (USA)	13:33.30
10,000 metres	Mo Farah; Great Britain & N.I. (GBR)	26:49.51 WL	Joshua Cheptegei; Uganda (UGA)	26:49.94 PB	Paul Tanui; Kenya (KEN)	26:50.60 SB
Marathon	Geoffrey Kirui; Kenya (KEN)	2:08:27	Tamirat Tola; Ethiopia (ETH)	2:09:49	Alphonce Simbu; Tanzania (TAN)	2:09:51
110 metres hurdles	Omar McLeod; Jamaica (JAM)	13.04	Sergey Shubenkov; Authorised Neutral Athletes (ANA)	13.14	Balázs Baji; Hungary (HUN)	13.28
400 metres hurdles	Karsten Warholm; Norway (NOR)	48.35	Yasmani Copello; Turkey (TUR)	48.49	Kerron Clement; United States (USA)	48.52
3000 metres steeplechase	Conseslus Kipruto; Kenya (KEN)	8:14.12	Soufiane El Bakkali; Morocco (MAR)	8:14.49	Evan Jager; United States (USA)	8:15.53
20 kilometres walk	Éider Arévalo; Colombia (COL)	1:18:53 NR	Sergey Shirobokov; Authorised Neutral Athletes (ANA)	1:18:55	Caio Bonfim; Brazil (BRA)	1:19:04 NR
50 kilometres walk	Yohann Diniz; France (FRA)	3:33:12 CR	Hirooki Arai; Japan (JPN)	3:41:17 SB	Kai Kobayashi; Japan (JPN)	3:41:19 PB
4 × 100 metres relay	Great Britain & N.I. Chijindu Ujah; Adam Gemili; Danny Talbot; Nethaneel Mitchell-Blake	37.47 WL, AR	United States; Mike Rodgers; Justin Gatlin; Jaylen Bacon; Christian Coleman; BeeJay Lee*	37.52 SB	Japan; Shuhei Tada; Shota Iizuka; Yoshihide Kiryu; Kenji Fujimitsu; Asuka Cambridge*	38.04 SB
4 × 400 metres relay	Trinidad and Tobago; Jarrin Solomon; Jereem Richards; Machel Cedenio; Lalonde Gordon; Renny Quow*	2:58.12 WL, NR	United States; Wilbert London; Gil Roberts; Michael Cherry; Fred Kerley; Bryshon Nellum*; Tony McQuay*	2:58.61SB	Great Britain & N.I. Matthew Hudson-Smith; Rabah Yousif; Dwayne Cowan; Martyn Rooney; Jack Green*	2:59.00 SB
WR world record | AR area record | CR championship record | GR games record | NR national record | OR Olympic record | PB personal best | SB season best | WL world leading (in a given season)

* Indicates the athlete only competed in the preliminary heats and received medals.

==== Field ====
Chronology: 2013 | 2015 | 2017 | 2019 | 2021

Event	Gold		Silver		Bronze	
High jump	Mutaz Essa Barshim; Qatar (QAT)	2.35 m	Danil Lysenko; Authorised Neutral Athletes (ANA)	2.32 m	Majd Eddin Ghazal; Syria (SYR)	2.29 m
Pole vault	Sam Kendricks; United States (USA)	5.95 m	Piotr Lisek; Poland (POL)	5.89 m	Renaud Lavillenie; France (FRA)	5.89 m SB
Long jump	Luvo Manyonga; South Africa (RSA)	8.48 m	Jarrion Lawson; United States (USA)	8.44 m	Rushwahl Samaai; South Africa (RSA)	8.32 m
Triple jump	Christian Taylor; United States (USA)	17.68 m	Will Claye; United States (USA)	17.63 m	Nelson Évora; Portugal (POR)	17.19 m
Shot put	Tomas Walsh; New Zealand (NZL)	22.03 m	Joe Kovacs; United States (USA)	21.66 m	Stipe Žunić; Croatia (CRO)	21.46 m
Discus throw	Andrius Gudžius; Lithuania (LTU)	69.21 m PB	Daniel Ståhl; Sweden (SWE)	69.19 m	Mason Finley; United States (USA)	68.03 m PB
Javelin throw	Johannes Vetter; Germany (GER)	89.89 m	Jakub Vadlejch; Czech Republic (CZE)	89.73 m PB	Petr Frydrych; Czech Republic (CZE)	88.32 m PB
Hammer throw	Paweł Fajdek; Poland (POL)	79.81 m	Valeriy Pronkin; Authorised Neutral Athletes (ANA)	78.16 m	Wojciech Nowicki; Poland (POL)	78.03 m
WR world record | AR area record | CR championship record | GR games record | NR national record | OR Olympic record | PB personal best | SB season best | WL world leading (in a given season)

==== Combined ====
Chronology: 2013 | 2015 | 2017 | 2019 | 2021

Event	Gold		Silver		Bronze	
Decathlon	Kevin Mayer; France (FRA)	8768 WL	Rico Freimuth; Germany (GER)	8564	Kai Kazmirek; Germany (GER)	8488 SB
WR world record | AR area record | CR championship record | GR games record | NR national record | OR Olympic record | PB personal best | SB season best | WL world leading (in a given season)

=== Women ===
==== Track ====
Chronology: 2013 | 2015 | 2017 | 2019 | 2021

Event	Gold		Silver		Bronze	
100 metres	Tori Bowie; United States (USA)	10.85 SB	Marie-Josée Ta Lou; Ivory Coast (CIV)	10.86 PB	Dafne Schippers; Netherlands (NED)	10.96
200 metres	Dafne Schippers; Netherlands (NED)	22.05 SB	Marie-Josée Ta Lou; Ivory Coast (CIV)	22.08 NR	Shaunae Miller-Uibo; Bahamas (BAH)	22.15
400 metres	Phyllis Francis; United States (USA)	49.92 PB	Salwa Eid Naser; Bahrain (BHR)	50.06 NR	Allyson Felix; United States (USA)	50.08
800 metres	Caster Semenya; South Africa (RSA)	1:55.16 WL, NR	Francine Niyonsaba; Burundi (BDI)	1:55.92	Ajeé Wilson; United States (USA)	1:56.65
1500 metres	Faith Kipyegon; Kenya (KEN)	4:02.59	Jennifer Simpson; United States (USA)	4:02.76	Caster Semenya; South Africa (RSA)	4:02.90
5000 metres	Hellen Obiri; Kenya (KEN)	14:34.86	Almaz Ayana; Ethiopia (ETH)	14:40.35 SB	Sifan Hassan; Netherlands (NED)	14:42.73
10,000 metres	Almaz Ayana; Ethiopia (ETH)	30:16.32 WL	Tirunesh Dibaba; Ethiopia (ETH)	31:02.69 SB	Agnes Jebet Tirop; Kenya (KEN)	31:03.50 PB
Marathon	Rose Chelimo; Bahrain (BHR)	2:27:11	Edna Kiplagat; Kenya (KEN)	2:27:18	Amy Cragg; United States (USA)	2:27:18
100 metres hurdles	Sally Pearson; Australia (AUS)	12.59	Dawn Harper-Nelson; United States (USA)	12.63 SB	Pamela Dutkiewicz; Germany (GER)	12.72
400 metres hurdles	Kori Carter; United States (USA)	53.07	Dalilah Muhammad; United States (USA)	53.50	Ristananna Tracey; Jamaica (JAM)	53.74 PB
3000 metres steeplechase	Emma Coburn; United States (USA)	9:02.58 CR	Courtney Frerichs; United States (USA)	9:03.77 PB	Hyvin Jepkemoi; Kenya (KEN)	9:04.03
20 kilometres walk	Yang Jiayu; China (CHN)	1:26:18 PB	Lupita González; Mexico (MEX)	1:26:19 SB	Antonella Palmisano; Italy (ITA)	1:26:36 PB
50 kilometres walk	Inês Henriques; Portugal (POR)	4:05:56 WR	Yin Hang; China (CHN)	4:08:58 AR	Yang Shuqing; China (CHN)	4:20:50
4 × 100 metres relay	United States; Aaliyah Brown; Allyson Felix; Morolake Akinosun; Tori Bowie; Ariana Washington*	41.82 WL	Great Britain & N.I. Asha Philip; Desirèe Henry; Dina Asher-Smith; Daryll Neita	42.12	Jamaica; Jura Levy; Natasha Morrison; Simone Facey; Sashalee Forbes; Christania Williams*	42.19 SB
4 × 400 metres relay	United States; Quanera Hayes; Allyson Felix; Shakima Wimbley; Phyllis Francis; Kendall Ellis*; Natasha Hastings*	3:19:02 WL	Great Britain & N.I. Zoey Clark; Laviai Nielsen; Eilidh Doyle; Emily Diamond; Perri Shakes-Drayton*	3:25:00	Poland; Małgorzata Hołub; Iga Baumgart; Aleksandra Gaworska; Justyna Święty; Patrycja Wyciszkiewicz*; Martyna Dąbrowska*	3:25:41 SB
WR world record | AR area record | CR championship record | GR games record | NR national record | OR Olympic record | PB personal best | SB season best | WL world leading (in a given season)

* Indicates the athlete only competed in the preliminary heats and received medals.

==== Field ====
Chronology: 2013 | 2015 | 2017 | 2019 | 2021

Event	Gold		Silver		Bronze	
High jump	Mariya Lasitskene; Authorised Neutral Athletes (ANA)	2.03 m	Yuliya Levchenko; Ukraine (UKR)	2.01 m PB	Kamila Lićwinko; Poland (POL)	1.99 m SB
Pole vault	Katerina Stefanidi; Greece (GRE)	4.91 m WL, NR	Sandi Morris; United States (USA)	4.75 m	Robeilys Peinado; Venezuela (VEN) Yarisley Silva; Cuba (CUB)	4.65 m =NR 4.65 m
Long jump	Brittney Reese; United States (USA)	7.02 m	Darya Klishina; Authorised Neutral Athletes (ANA)	7.00 m SB	Tianna Bartoletta; United States (USA)	6.97 m
Triple jump	Yulimar Rojas; Venezuela (VEN)	14.91 m	Caterine Ibargüen; Colombia (COL)	14.89 m SB	Olga Rypakova; Kazakhstan (KAZ)	14.77 m SB
Shot put	Gong Lijiao; China (CHN)	19.94 m	Anita Márton; Hungary (HUN)	19.49 m	Michelle Carter; United States (USA)	19.14 m
Discus throw	Sandra Perković; Croatia (CRO)	70.31 m	Dani Stevens; Australia (AUS)	69.64 m	Mélina Robert-Michon; France (FRA)	66.21 m SB
Hammer throw	Anita Włodarczyk; Poland (POL)	77.90 m	Wang Zheng; China (CHN)	75.98 m	Malwina Kopron; Poland (POL)	74.76 m
Javelin throw	Barbora Špotáková; Czech Republic (CZE)	66.76 m	Li Lingwei; China (CHN)	66.25 m PB	Lü Huihui; China (CHN)	65.26 m
WR world record | AR area record | CR championship record | GR games record | NR national record | OR Olympic record | PB personal best | SB season best | WL world leading (in a given season)

==== Combined ====
Chronology: 2013 | 2015 | 2017 | 2019 | 2021

Event	Gold		Silver		Bronze	
Heptathlon	Nafissatou Thiam; Belgium (BEL)	6784	Carolin Schäfer; Germany (GER)	6696	Anouk Vetter; Netherlands (NED)	6636
WR world record | AR area record | CR championship record | GR games record | NR national record | OR Olympic record | PB personal best | SB season best | WL world leading (in a given season)

== Medal table ==
* Host nation (Host nation)

Rank	Nation	Gold	Silver	Bronze	Total
1	United States	10	11	9	30
2	Kenya	5	2	4	11
3	South Africa	3	1	2	6
4	France	3	0	2	5
5	China	2	3	2	7
6	Great Britain & N.I.*	2	3	1	6
7	Ethiopia	2	3	0	5
8	Poland	2	2	4	8
–	Authorised Neutral Athletes^{[1]}	1	5	0	6
9	Germany	1	2	2	5
10	Czech Republic	1	1	1	3
11	Australia	1	1	0	2
11	Bahrain	1	1	0	2
11	Colombia	1	1	0	2
11	Turkey	1	1	0	2
15	Jamaica	1	0	3	4
15	Netherlands	1	0	3	4
17	Croatia	1	0	1	2
17	Norway	1	0	1	2
17	Portugal	1	0	1	2
17	Qatar	1	0	1	2
17	Trinidad and Tobago	1	0	1	2
17	Venezuela	1	0	1	2
23	Belgium	1	0	0	1
23	Greece	1	0	0	1
23	Lithuania	1	0	0	1
23	New Zealand	1	0	0	1
27	Ivory Coast	0	2	0	2
28	Japan	0	1	2	3
29	Bahamas	0	1	1	2
29	Hungary	0	1	1	2
31	Burundi	0	1	0	1
31	Mexico	0	1	0	1
31	Morocco	0	1	0	1
31	Sweden	0	1	0	1
31	Uganda	0	1	0	1
31	Ukraine	0	1	0	1
37	Brazil	0	0	1	1
37	Cuba	0	0	1	1
37	Italy	0	0	1	1
37	Kazakhstan	0	0	1	1
37	Syria (SYR)	0	0	1	1
37	Tanzania	0	0	1	1
Totals (42 entries)		48	48	49	145

Notes

^[1] IAAF does not include the six medals (1 gold and 5 silver) won by athletes competing as Authorised Neutral Athletes in their official medal table.

== Placing table ==
In the IAAF placing table the total score is obtained from assigning eight points to the first place and so on to one point for the eight placed finalists. Points are shared in situations where a tie occurs. 65 IAAF members received points.

* Host nation

Rank	Country	1st place, gold medalist(s)	2nd place, silver medalist(s)	3rd place, bronze medalist(s)	4	5	6	7	8	Points
1	United States	10	11	9	2	6	5	4	4	272
2	Kenya	5	2	4	5	2	2	3	1	124
3	Great Britain & N.I.	2	3	1	5	3	6	2	3	105
4	Poland	2	2	4	0	3	3	5	1	86
5	China	2	3	2	3	1	1	3	4	81
6	Germany	1	2	2	3	4	3	1	2	78
7	Ethiopia	2	3	0	2	3	1	3	2	70
8	France	3	0	2	4	1	2	0	2	68
8	Jamaica	1	0	3	4	3	2	0	4	68
10	South Africa	3	1	2	1	1	0	0	0	52
11	Netherlands	1	0	3	0	2	0	2	2	40
12	Czech Republic	1	1	1	2	1	0	0	2	37
13	Cuba	0	0	1	3	2	1	1	1	35
14	Canada	0	0	0	0	2	5	2	3	30
15	Bahrain	1	1	0	0	1	2	0	1	26
16	Japan	0	1	2	0	1	0	1	0	25
17	Australia	1	1	0	0	0	2	1	0	23
17	Trinidad and Tobago	1	0	1	0	0	2	1	1	23
19	Brazil	0	0	1	1	1	0	3	0	21
19	Turkey	1	1	0	0	1	0	1	0	21
21	Bahamas	0	1	1	1	0	0	0	1	19
21	Ivory Coast	0	2	0	1	0	0	0	0	19
21	Colombia	1	1	0	0	1	0	0	0	19
21	Croatia	1	0	1	1	0	0	0	0	19
25	Portugal	1	0	1	0	0	1	0	0	17
26	Hungary	0	1	1	0	0	1	0	0	16
26	Qatar	1	0	1	0	0	0	1	0	16
28	Ukraine	0	1	0	1	0	1	0	0	15
29	Botswana	0	0	0	1	1	1	1	0	14
29	Spain	0	0	0	1	1	0	2	1	14
29	Norway	1	0	1	0	0	0	0	0	14
29	Venezuela	1	0	1	0	0	0	0	0	14
33	Belgium	1	0	0	1	0	0	0	0	13
34	Mexico	0	1	0	1	0	0	0	0	12
35	Greece	1	0	0	0	0	1	0	0	11
36	Lithuania	1	0	0	0	0	0	1	0	10
37	Italy	0	0	1	0	0	1	0	0	9
37	New Zealand	1	0	0	0	0	0	0	1	9
37	Switzerland	0	0	0	0	2	0	0	1	9
40	Azerbaijan	0	0	0	0	2	0	0	0	8
40	Belarus	0	0	0	0	0	2	1	0	8
40	Morocco	0	1	0	0	0	0	0	1	8
40	Sweden	0	1	0	0	0	0	0	1	8

== Participants ==
Below is the list of countries and other neutral groupings who participated in the championships and the requested number of athlete places for each.

Participating teams
- Afghanistan (1)
- Albania (1)
- Algeria (8)
- Andorra (1)
- Angola (1)
- Anguilla (1)
- Antigua and Barbuda (5)
- Argentina (10)
- Armenia (1)
- Athlete Refugee Team (5)
- Aruba (1)
- Australia (62)
- Austria (5)
- Authorised Neutral Athletes (19)
- Azerbaijan (4)
- Bahamas (27)
- Bahrain (26)
- Bangladesh (1)
- Barbados (8)
- Belarus (16)
- Belgium (18)
- Bermuda (1)
- Benin (2)
- Bosnia and Herzegovina (3)
- Belize (1)
- Bolivia (2)
- Botswana (12)
- Brazil (39)
- British Virgin Islands (3)
- Brunei (1)
- Bulgaria (8)
- Burkina Faso (2)
- Burundi (4)
- Cambodia (1)
- Cameroon (2)
- Canada (57)
- Cape Verde (1)
- Cayman Islands (2)
- Central African Republic (1)
- Chad (1)
- Chile (9)
- China (50)
- Chinese Taipei (2)
- Congo (2)
- Colombia (20)
- Comoros (1)
- Cook Islands (1)
- Costa Rica (1)
- Croatia (9)
- Cuba (28)
- Cyprus (5)
- Czech Republic (27)
- DR Congo (1)
- Denmark (4)
- Djibouti (4)
- Dominica (2)
- Dominican Republic (3)
- Ecuador (17)
- Egypt (4)
- El Salvador (1)
- Equatorial Guinea (1)
- Eritrea (8)
- Estonia (14)
- Ethiopia (46)
- Fiji (1)
- Finland (12)
- France (55)
- French Polynesia (1)
- Gabon (1)
- Gambia (1)
- Georgia (1)
- Germany (76)
- Ghana (8)
- Gibraltar (1)
- Great Britain & N.I. (92)
- Greece (21)
- Grenada (4)
- Guam (1)
- Guatemala (7)
- Guinea (1)
- Guinea-Bissau (1)
- Guyana (2)
- Haiti (2)
- Honduras (1)
- Hong Kong (1)
- Hungary (16)
- Iceland (3)
- India (25)
- Indonesia (1)
- Iran (3)
- Iraq (1)
- Ireland (12)
- Israel (8)
- Italy (36)
- Ivory Coast (4)
- Jamaica (63)
- Japan (47)
- Jordan (1)
- Kazakhstan (13)
- Kenya (50)
- Kiribati (1)
- Kosovo (1)
- Kuwait (3)
- Kyrgyzstan (4)
- Laos (1)
- Latvia (12)
- Lebanon (1)
- Lesotho (3)
- Liberia (1)
- Lithuania (15)
- Luxembourg (1)
- Macau (1)
- Madagascar (1)
- Macedonia (1)
- Malaysia (1)
- Malawi (1)
- Maldives (1)
- Mali (1)
- Malta (1)
- Marshall Islands (1)
- Mauritania (1)
- Mauritius (1)
- Mexico (15)
- Federated States of Micronesia (1)
- Moldova (5)
- Monaco (1)
- Mongolia (5)
- Montenegro (1)
- Montserrat (1)
- Morocco (15)
- Mozambique (1)
- Myanmar (1)
- Namibia (5)
- Nauru (1)
- Nepal (1)
- Netherlands (30)
- New Zealand (12)
- Nicaragua (1)
- Niger (1)
- Nigeria (15)
- North Korea (3)
- Northern Mariana Islands (1)
- Norway (13)
- Oman (1)
- Palau (1)
- Pakistan (1)
- Palestine (2)
- Panama (3)
- Papua New Guinea (3)
- Paraguay (2)
- Peru (7)
- Philippines (1)
- Poland (51)
- Portugal (21)
- Puerto Rico (5)
- Qatar (5)
- Romania (15)
- Rwanda (1)
- Saint Kitts and Nevis (1)
- Saint Lucia (1)
- Saint Vincent and the Grenadines (1)
- Samoa (2)
- São Tomé and Príncipe (1)
- Saudi Arabia (1)
- Serbia (8)
- Seychelles (1)
- Sierra Leone (1)
- Slovakia (5)
- Slovenia (7)
- Solomon Islands (1)
- Somalia (1)
- South Africa (29)
- South Korea (17)
- South Sudan (1)
- Spain (59)
- Sri Lanka (4)
- Sudan (1)
- Suriname (1)
- Swaziland (1)
- Sweden (32)
- Switzerland (19)
- Syria (1)
- Tajikistan (2)
- Tanzania (8)
- Thailand (2)
- Togo (1)
- Trinidad and Tobago (25)
- Tunisia (5)
- Turkey (27)
- Turkmenistan (1)
- Turks and Caicos Islands (1)
- Tuvalu (1)
- Uganda (22)
- Ukraine (48)
- United Arab Emirates (1)
- United States (167)
- Uruguay (5)
- U.S. Virgin Islands (1)
- Uzbekistan (2)
- Vanuatu (1)
- Venezuela (11)
- Vietnam (1)
- Zambia (2)
- Zimbabwe (5)

=== Russian suspension ===
Russia is currently indefinitely suspended from international competition due to a doping scandal, and will therefore not be present at the Championships. Nevertheless, 19 Russian athletes have been allowed to participate in international competition included as "authorised neutral athletes" at London 2017 following a long process to show that they were not directly implicated in Russia's state doping program. These athletes include Mariya Lasitskene (high jump), Sergey Shubenkov (110 metres hurdles), Ilya Shkurenev (decathlon), Aleksandr Menkov (long jump) and Anzhelika Sidorova (pole vault) plus names from 2016 such as Darya Klishina (long jump) (Note: On 31 July 2017, IAAF announced that Russia was still banned indefinitely unless several criteria for reinstatement were met, including meaningful drugs testing being conducted and more acceptance of the McLaren report which exposed the country's state-sponsored doping and led to the ban.)

=== Refugees ===
For the first time, an Athlete Refugee Team delegation was present at the competition, mirroring the efforts to include refugee athletes that had occurred at the athletics at the 2016 Summer Olympics. A total of five athletes – all of them Kenya-based refugees – were entered as part of the Athlete Refugee Team, including Somali Ahmed Bashir Farah, Ethiopian Kadar Omar Abdullahi, and South Sudanese middle-distance runners Dominic Lokinyomo Lobalu, Rose Lokonyen and Anjelina Lohalith.

=== Quarantine ===
An outbreak of norovirus occurred at a local hotel affecting 30 athletes and officials.

=== Doping ===
An anti-doping programme was overseen at the championships for the first time by the Athletics Integrity Unit (AIU) – an independent anti-doping board within the IAAF. A total of 1513 samples were collected at the competition and were sent to Ghent for analysis by a World Anti-Doping Agency-accredited laboratory . The samples comprised 596 urine sample (212 of which were tested for erythropoietin) and 917 blood samples. The blood samples were divided into two forms – 725 were taken to feed into the long-term athlete biological passport initiative and 192 were taken specifically to identify use of human growth hormone and erythropoiesis stimulating agents. The in-competition anti-doping scheme was complemented by a more extensive out-of-competition testing programme, which was intelligence and performance-led and amounted to over 2000 blood tests and over 3000 urine samples. An anti-doping education initiative also took place, led by the AIU and the IAAF Athletes' Commission, including an Athletes' Integrity Pledge which was taken by around 2500 athletes.

Two of Ukraine's foremost athletes, Olesya Povkh and Olha Zemlyak, were suspended for failed doping tests immediately before the championships in London.

The initial findings of the in-competition tests were that three athletes tested positive for doping, none of whom were medalists. The names of the athletes were not announced, allowing the athletes to contest the result and request a b-sample test.

== See also ==
- 2017 World Para Athletics Championships
- 2017 World Championships in Athletics qualification standards
