= Regina Rykova =

Kazakhstani racewalker

Personal information
- Born: 1991 (age 33–34)

Sport
- Country: Kazakhstan
- Event: Racewalking

Regina Rykova (born 1991) is a Kazakhstani racewalker. In 2017, she competed in the women's 20 kilometres walk event at the 2017 World Athletics Championships held in London, United Kingdom. She finished in 52nd place.

In 2016, she competed in the women's 20 km walk at the 2016 IAAF World Race Walking Team Championships held in Rome, Italy.
