= Great Britain and Northern Ireland at the 2017 World Championships in Athletics =

- WA code: GBR
- Website: www.britishathletics.org.uk

in London
- Competitors: 92 in 39 events
- Medals Ranked 6th: Gold 2 Silver 3 Bronze 1 Total 6

World Championships in Athletics appearances (overview)
- 1976; 1980; 1983; 1987; 1991; 1993; 1995; 1997; 1999; 2001; 2003; 2005; 2007; 2009; 2011; 2013; 2015; 2017; 2019; 2022; 2023; 2025

Great Britain and Northern Ireland competed at the 2017 IAAF World Championships in London, from 4–13 August 2017. It was the first time that the United Kingdom had hosted the World Championships. Mo Farah won the first medal for the host nation, also winning the first gold medal of the Championships (in the 10,000 metres).

== Medallists ==
Medal	Name	Event	Date
Gold	Mo Farah	Men's 10,000 m	August 4
Gold	Adam Gemili; Nethaneel Mitchell-Blake; Danny Talbot; CJ Ujah	Men's 4 × 100 metres relay	August 12
Silver	Mo Farah	Men's 5,000 m	August 12
Silver	Dina Asher-Smith; Desirèe Henry; Daryll Neita; Asha Philip	Women's 4 × 100 metres relay	August 12
Silver	Zoey Clark; Emily Diamond; Eilidh Doyle; Laviai Nielsen; Perri Shakes-Drayton*	Women's 4 × 400 metres relay	August 13
Bronze	Dwayne Cowan; Jack Green*; Matthew Hudson-Smith; Martyn Rooney; Rabah Yousif	Men's 4 × 400 metres relay	August 13

* – Indicates the athlete competed in preliminaries but not the final

== Medal and performance targets ==
UK Sport targeted a minimum of 6 medals for London 2017, just slightly fewer than the set target of seven medals from the 2016 Summer Olympics Athletics events. The GB squad met this target on 13 August and finished with a total of 6 medals.

Key	✗ Target missed	✓ Target met	✓ ✓ Target exceeded

Sport	Medals target set	Medals or result	Target missed, met, or exceeded
Athletics	6–8	6	✓

== Results ==
=== Men ===
Track and road events

Athlete	Event	Heat		Semifinal		Final	
Athlete	Event	Result	Rank	Result	Rank	Result	Rank
James Dasaolu	100 metres	10.13	=10 Q	10.22	15	Did not advance	
Reece Prescod	100 metres	10.03 PB	5 Q	10.05	4 Q	10.17	7
CJ Ujah	100 metres	10.07	9 Q	10.12	9	Did not advance	
Zharnel Hughes	200 metres	20.43	15 q	20.85	24	Did not advance	
Nethaneel Mitchell-Blake	200 metres	20.08	2 Q	20.19	5 q	20.24	4
Danny Talbot	200 metres	20.16 PB	5 Q	20.38	9	Did not advance	
Dwayne Cowan	400 metres	45.39	19 Q	45.96	24	Did not advance	
Matthew Hudson-Smith	400 metres	45.31	17 q	44.74 SB	9	Did not advance	
Martyn Rooney	400 metres	45.75	26	Did not advance			
Elliot Giles	800 metres	1:45.86	9 Q	1:46.95	20	Did not advance	
Kyle Langford	800 metres	1:46.38	17 q	1:45.81	5 Q	1:45.25 PB	4
Guy Learmonth	800 metres	1:45.90	10 Q	1:46.75	19	Did not advance	
Josh Kerr	1500 metres	3:47.30	34	Did not advance			
Chris O'Hare	1500 metres	3:42.53	14 Q	3:38.59	4 Q	3:38.28	12
Jake Wightman	1500 metres	3:38.50	4 Q	3:41.79	20	Did not advance	
Andrew Butchart	5000 metres	13:24.78	7 q	—N/a		13:38.73	8
Mo Farah	5000 metres	13:30.18	15 Q	—N/a		13:33.22	2nd place, silver medalist(s)
Marc Scott	5000 metres	13:58.11	33	—N/a		Did not advance	
Mo Farah	10,000 metres	—N/a				26:49.51	1st place, gold medalist(s)
Andrew Davies	Marathon	—N/a				2:17:59	31
Josh Griffiths	Marathon	—N/a				2:20:06	39
Callum Hawkins	Marathon	—N/a				2:10:17 PB	4
Rob Mullett	3000 metres steeplechase	8:47.99	41	—N/a		Did not advance	
Zak Seddon	3000 metres steeplechase	8:32.84	22	—N/a		Did not advance	
Iuean Thomas	3000 metres steeplechase	8:52.96	43	—N/a		Did not advance	
David King	110 metres hurdles	13.67	33	Did not advance			
David Omoregie	110 metres hurdles	13.59	26	Did not advance			
Andrew Pozzi	110 metres hurdles	13.28	4 Q	13.28	10	Did not advance	
Jack Green	400 metres hurdles	49.55	12 q	49.93	13	Did not advance	
CJ Ujah; Adam Gemili; Danny Talbot; Nethaneel Mitchell-Blake	4 × 100 metres relay	37.76 SB	2 Q	—N/a		37.47 WL AR	1st place, gold medalist(s)
Matthew Hudson-Smith; Rabah Yousif; Dwayne Cowan; Martyn Rooney; Jack Green*	4 × 400 metres relay	3:00.10 SB	4 q	—N/a		2:59.00 SB	3rd place, bronze medalist(s)
Tom Bosworth	20km walk	—N/a				DSQ	–
Callum Wilkinson	20km walk	—N/a				1:23:54	41
Dominic King	50km walk	—N/a				DSQ	–

* – Indicates the athlete competed in preliminaries but not the final

Field events

Athlete	Event	Qualification		Final	
Athlete	Event	Distance	Position	Distance	Position
Robbie Grabarz	High jump	2.31 SB	6 Q	2.25	6
Nathan Fox	Triple jump	16.49	19	Did not advance	
Chris Bennett	Hammer throw	72.05	21	Did not advance	
Nick Miller	Hammer throw	75.52	7 Q	77.31	6

Combined events – Decathlon

Athlete	Event	100 m	LJ	SP	HJ	400 m	110H	DT	PV	JT	1500 m	Final	Rank
Ashley Bryant	Result	11.14 SB	7.44	14.09	1.96	49.24	14.75	43.95 SB	4.30	67.97 SB	4:27.15 PB	8049	11
Ashley Bryant	Points	830	920	734	767	850	880	745	702	858	763	8049	11

=== Women ===
Track and road events

Athlete	Event	Heat		Semifinal		Final	
Athlete	Event	Result	Rank	Result	Rank	Result	Rank
Desirèe Henry	100 metres	11.32	24 q	11.24	18	Did not advance	
Daryll Neita	100 metres	11.15	13 Q	11.16	13	Did not advance	
Asha Philip	100 metres	11.14 SB	12 q	11.19	16	Did not advance	
Dina Asher-Smith	200 metres	22.73 SB	4 Q	22.73 SB	6 Q	22.22 SB	4
Shannon Hylton	200 metres	23.39	23	Did not advance			
Bianca Williams	200 metres	23.30	19 q	23.40	21	Did not advance	
Zoey Clark	400 metres	51.88	18 Q	51.81 PB	16	Did not advance	
Emily Diamond	400 metres	52.20	25	Did not advance			
Anyika Onuora	400 metres	52.58	34	Did not advance			
Shelayna Oskan-Clarke	800 metres	2:01.30	14 Q	2:02.26	22	Did not advance	
Lynsey Sharp	800 metres	2:01.04	9 Q	1:59.47	5 q	1:58.98	8
Adelle Tracey	800 metres	2:00.28 PB	4 q	2:00.26	11	Did not advance	
Jessica Judd	1500 metres	4:03.73	12 Q	4:10.14	22	Did not advance	
Sarah McDonald	1500 metres	4:05.48	18 q	4:06.73	17	Did not advance	
Laura Muir	1500 metres	4:08.97	26 Q	4:03.64	2 Q	4:02.97	4
Laura Weightman	1500 metres	4:03.50	8 Q	4:05.63	10 Q	4:04.11	6
Eilish McColgan	5000 metres	15:00.38 PB	11 Q	—N/a		15:00.43	10
Laura Muir	5000 metres	14:59.34	8 q	—N/a		14:52.07	6
Steph Twell	5000 metres	15:41.29	31	—N/a		Did not advance	
Jess Martin	10,000 metres	—N/a				DNF	–
Beth Potter	10,000 metres	—N/a				32:15.88	21
Charlotte Taylor	10,000 metres	—N/a				32:51.33	27
Tracy Barlow	Marathon	—N/a				2:41:03	43
Alyson Dixon	Marathon	—N/a				2:31:36	18
Charlotte Purdue	Marathon	—N/a				2:29:48	13
Rosie Clarke	3000 metres steeplechase	9:49.36	25	—N/a		Did not advance	
Lennie Waite	3000 metres steeplechase	9:54.97	30	—N/a		Did not advance	
Alicia Barrett	100 metres hurdles	13.42	37	Did not advance			
Tiffany Porter	100 metres hurdles	13.18	29	Did not advance			
Meghan Beesley	400 metres hurdles	56.41	22 q	56.61	20	Did not advance	
Eilidh Doyle	400 metres hurdles	55.49	14 Q	55.33	8 q	55.71	8
Jessica Turner	400 metres hurdles	56.98	31	Did not advance			
Asha Philip; Desirèe Henry; Dina Asher-Smith; Daryll Neita	4 × 100 metres relay	41.93 SB	2 Q	—N/a		42.12	2nd place, silver medalist(s)
Zoey Clark; Emily Diamond; Eilidh Doyle; Laviai Nielsen; Perri Shakes-Drayton*	4 × 400 metres relay	3:24.74 SB	3 Q	—N/a		3:25.00	2nd place, silver medalist(s)
Gemma Bridge	20km walk	—N/a				1:36:04	40
Bethan Davies	20km walk	—N/a				1:33:10	29

* – Indicates the athlete competed in preliminaries but not the final

Field events

Athlete	Event	Qualification		Final	
Athlete	Event	Distance	Position	Distance	Position
Morgan Lake	High jump	1.92	6 q	1.95	6
Katarina Johnson-Thompson	High jump	1.92	4 q	1.95 SB	5
Holly Bradshaw	Pole vault	4.50	10 q	4.65	6
Shara Proctor	Long jump	6.45	13	Did not advance	
Jazmin Sawyers	Long jump	6.34	18	Did not advance	
Lorraine Ugen	Long jump	6.63	3 q	6.72	5
Jade Lally	Discus throw	57.71	19	Did not advance	
Sophie Hitchon	Hammer throw	73.05	3 Q	72.32	7

Combined events – Heptathlon

Athlete	Event	100H	HJ	SP	200 m	LJ	JT	800 m	Final	Rank
Katarina Johnson-Thompson	Result	13.33	1.80	12.47	22.86	6.56	41.72	2:08.10	6558	5
Katarina Johnson-Thompson	Points	1075	978	692	1093	1027	700	993	6558	5

Key

- Q = Qualified for the next round
- q = Qualified for the next round as a fastest loser or, in field events, by position without achieving the qualifying target
- NR = National record
- AR = Area/Continental record
- PB = Personal best
- SB = Season's best
- N/A = Round not applicable for the event
