= 2017 World Championships in Athletics – Women's 20 kilometres walk =

Women's 20 kilometres walk at the 2017 World Championships
- Venue: Olympic Stadium
- Dates: 13 August (final)
- Competitors: 60 from 34 nations
- Winning time: 1:26:18

Medalists
gold medal	Yang Jiayu	China
silver medal	María Guadalupe González	Mexico
bronze medal	Antonella Palmisano	Italy

The women's 20 kilometres race walk was held on a 2 kilometre course comprising lengths of The Mall between Buckingham Palace and Admiralty Arch on 13 August.

== Summary ==
Defending champion, Olympic champion and defending champion Liu Hong was absent. Still the race started faster than the Olympics. A pack of 20 formed on the front. That pack was whittled down to 10 by the halfway point. After Kimberly García (Peru) fell off the pace, the group was reduced to just five by the 12-kilometre mark: two Chinese, Yang Jiayu and Lü Xiuzhi; María Guadalupe González (Mexico); Antonella Palmisano (Italy); and Érica de Sena (Brazil). de Sena fell off the pace when the other four accelerated the pace at 16K. Another lap later, Palmisano couldn't handle the pace which looked like the break for the three medalists. Yang didn't have the same awards, but she was leading the group with the Olympic silver and bronze medalists.

The three were racing to the finish. Less than 100 metres before the finish, the chief judge stepped out to show Lü the red card signifying she had accumulated three red cards from judges around the course and was disqualified. Lü didn't believe the message and tried to finish, but it was true. Yang raced González to the line, winning by barely a second. Palmisano came in 17 seconds later to get an unexpected bronze. The top five did negative splits (walking the end of the race faster than the beginning). de Sena improved her own South American continental record. Four others set national records.

== Records ==
Before the competition records were as follows:

Record	Perf.	Athlete	Nat.	Date	Location
World	1:24:38	Liu Hong	CHN	6 Jun 2015	A Coruña, Spain
Championship	1:25:41	Olimpiada Ivanova	RUS	7 Aug 2005	Helsinki, Finland
World leading	1:25:18	Elena Lashmanova	RUS	18 Feb 2017	Sochi, Russia
African	1:30:43	Grace Wanjiru Njue	KEN	26 Jun 2016	Durban, South Africa
Asian	1:24:38	Liu Hong	CHN	6 Jun 2015	A Coruña, Spain
NACAC	1:26:17	Lupita González	MEX	7 May 2016	Rome, Italy
South American	1:27:18	Érica de Sena	BRA	7 May 2016	Rome, Italy
European	1:24:58	Elena Lashmanova	RUS	25 Jun 2016	Cheboksary, Russia
Oceanian	1:27:44	Jane Saville	AUS	2 May 2004	Naumburg, Germany

The following records were set at the competition:

Record	Perf.	Athlete	Nat.	Date
South American	1:26:59	Érica de Sena	BRA	13 Aug 2017
Brazilian	1:26:59	Érica de Sena	BRA	13 Aug 2017
Colombian	1:28:10	Sandra Arenas	COL	13 Aug 2017
Peruvian	1:29:13	Kimberly García	PER	13 Aug 2017
Hungarian	1:30:05	Viktória Madarász	HUN	13 Aug 2017
Hong Kong	1:35:04	Ching Siu Nga	HKG	13 Aug 2017

== Qualification standard ==
The standard to qualify automatically for entry was 1:36:00.

== Results ==
The final took place on 13 August at 12:21. The results were as follows:

Rank	Name	Nationality	Time	Notes
1st place, gold medalist(s)	Yang Jiayu	China	1:26:18	PB
2nd place, silver medalist(s)	Lupita González	Mexico	1:26:19	SB
3rd place, bronze medalist(s)	Antonella Palmisano	Italy	1:26:36	PB
4	Érica de Sena	Brazil	1:26:59	AR
5	Sandra Arenas	Colombia	1:28:10	NR
6	Ana Cabecinha	Portugal	1:28:57	SB
7	Kimberly García	Peru	1:29:13	NR
8	Wang Na	China	1:29:26	
9	Laura García-Caro	Spain	1:29:29	PB
10	María Pérez	Spain	1:29:37	PB
11	Mirna Ortiz	Guatemala	1:30:01	SB
12	Viktória Madarász	Hungary	1:30:05	NR
13	Paola Pérez	Ecuador	1:30:09	
14	Eleonora Giorgi	Italy	1:30:34	SB
15	Valentina Trapletti	Italy	1:30:35	PB
16	Brigita Virbalytė-Dimšienė	Lithuania	1:30:45	SB
17	Sandra Galvis	Colombia	1:31:13	
18	Kumiko Okada	Japan	1:31:19	
19	Živilė Vaiciukevičiūtė	Lithuania	1:31:23	PB
20	Inna Loseva	Ukraine	1:31:24	
21	Ainhoa Pinedo	Spain	1:31:28	
22	Regan Lamble	Australia	1:31:30	
23	Ángela Castro	Bolivia	1:31:34	SB
24	Antigoni Drisbioti	Greece	1:32:03	SB
25	Maria Michta-Coffey	United States	1:32:14	SB
26	Nastassia Yatsevich	Belarus	1:32:22	SB
27	Barbara Oláh	Hungary	1:32:44	PB
28	Maritza Guamán	Ecuador	1:33:06	
29	Bethan Davies	Great Britain & N.I.	1:33:10	
30	Jeon Yeong-eun	South Korea	1:33:29	SB
31	Andreea Arsine	Romania	1:33:46	PB
32	Valentyna Nayavka	Ukraine	1:33:59	PB
33	Miranda Melville	United States	1:34:47	
34	Ana Rodean	Romania	1:34:50	SB
35	Ching Siu Nga	Hong Kong	1:35:04	NR
36	Mária Czaková	Slovakia	1:35:11	
37	Grace Wanjiru	Kenya	1:35:22	
38	Beki Smith	Australia	1:35:31	
39	Chahinez Nasri	Tunisia	1:35:45	
40	Gemma Bridge	Great Britain & N.I.	1:36:04	
41	Johana Ordóñez	Ecuador	1:36:27	
42	Khushbir Kaur	India	1:36:41	
43	Claire Woods	Australia	1:37:05	SB
44	Yehualeye Beletew	Ethiopia	1:37:55	
45	Monika Vaiciukevičiūtė	Lithuania	1:38:08	
46	Milangela Rosales	Venezuela	1:38:08	
47	Diana Aydosova	Kazakhstan	1:38:16	SB
48	Lee Da-seul	South Korea	1:38:54	
49	Laura Polli	Switzerland	1:39:05	SB
50	Polina Repina	Kazakhstan	1:39:56	
51	Rita Récsei	Hungary	1:40:56	
52	Regina Rykova	Kazakhstan	1:41:59	
	Anežka Drahotová	Czech Republic	DNF	
	Despina Zapounidou	Greece	DNF	
	Klavdiya Afanasyeva	Authorised Neutral Athletes	DQ	230.6(a)
	Nadiya Borovska	Ukraine	DQ	230.6(a)
	Yeseida Carrillo	Colombia	DQ	230.6(a)
	Lü Xiuzhi	China	DQ	230.6(a)
	Agnese Pastare	Latvia	DQ	230.6(a)
	María Guadalupe Sánchez	Mexico	DQ	230.6(a)
	Askale Tiksa	Ethiopia	DNS	
