= 2017 World Championships in Athletics – Women's 800 metres =

Women's 800 metres at the 2017 World Championships
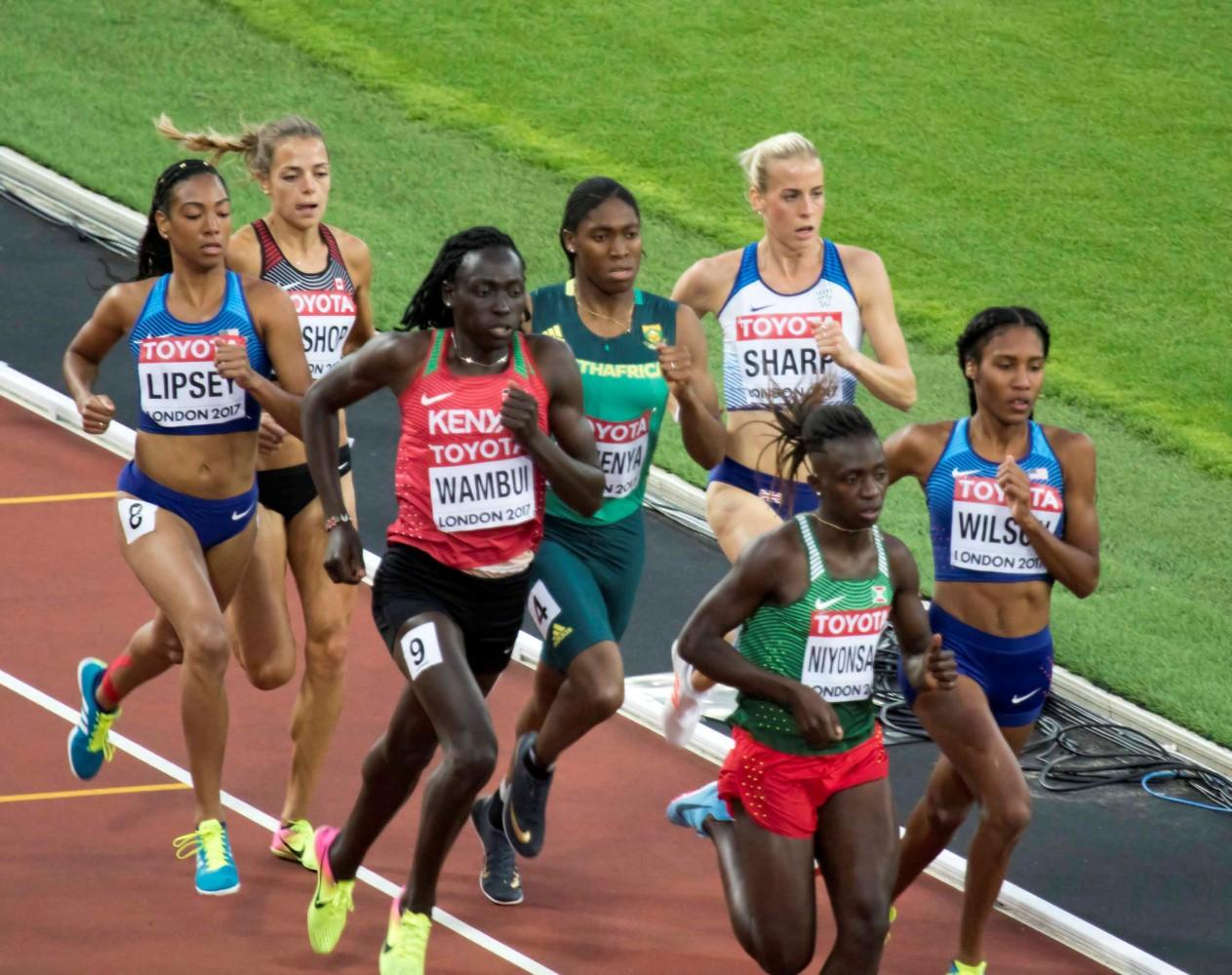
- The final of the event.
- Venue: Olympic Stadium
- Dates: 10 August (heats); 11 August (semifinal); 13 August (final)
- Competitors: 45 from 29 nations
- Winning time: 1:55.16

Medalists
gold medal	Caster Semenya	South Africa
silver medal	Francine Niyonsaba	Burundi
bronze medal	Ajeé Wilson	United States

The women's 800 metres at the 2017 World Championships in Athletics was held at the London Olympic Stadium on 10−11 and 13 August.

== Records ==
Before the competition records were as follows:

Record	Perf.	Athlete	Nat.	Date	Location
World	1:53.28	Jarmila Kratochvílová	TCH	26 Jul 1983	Munich, West Germany
Championship	1:54.68	Jarmila Kratochvílová	TCH	9 Aug 1983	Helsinki, Finland
World leading	1:55.27	Caster Semenya	RSA	21 Jul 2017	Monaco
African	1:54.01	Pamela Jelimo	KEN	29 Aug 2008	Zürich, Switzerland
Asian	1:55.54	Liu Dong	CHN	9 Sep 1993	Beijing, China
NACAC	1:54.44	Ana Fidelia Quirot	CUB	9 Sep 1989	Barcelona, Spain
South American	1:56.68	Letitia Vriesde	SUR	13 Aug 1995	Gothenburg, Sweden
European	1:53.28	Jarmila Kratochvílová	TCH	26 Jul 1983	Munich, West Germany
Oceanian	1:58.25	Toni Hodgkinson	NZL	7 Jul 1996	Atlanta, United States

The following records were set at the competition:

Record	Perf.	Athlete	Nat.	Date
World leading	1:55.16	Caster Semenya	RSA	13 Aug 2017

== Qualification standard ==
The standard to qualify automatically for entry was 2:01.00.

== Schedule ==
The event schedule, in local time (UTC+1), is as follows:

Date	Time	Round
10 August	19:25	Heats
11 August	19:35	Semifinals
13 August	20:10	Final

== Results ==
=== Heats ===
The first round took place on 10 August in six heats as follows:

Heat	1	2	3	4	5	6
Start time	19:24	19:33	19:42	19:51	20:01	20:10
Photo finish	link	link	link	link	link	link

The first three in each heat ( Q ) and the next six fastest ( q ) qualified for the semifinals. The overall results were as follows:

Rank	Heat	Lane	Name	Nationality	Time	Notes
1	6	5	Francine Niyonsaba	Burundi	1:59.86	Q
2	6	7	Habitam Alemu	Ethiopia	2:00.07	Q
3	6	9	Selina Büchel	Switzerland	2:00.23	Q
4	6	3	Adelle Tracey	Great Britain & N.I.	2:00.28	q, SB
5	1	6	Ajeé Wilson	United States	2:00.52	Q
6	4	4	Margaret Wambui	Kenya	2:00.75	Q
7	2	3	Angelika Cichocka	Poland	2:00.86	Q, SB
8	1	4	Noélie Yarigo	Benin	2:00.99	Q, SB
9	4	6	Lynsey Sharp	Great Britain & N.I.	2:01.04	Q
10	2	5	Melissa Bishop	Canada	2:01.11	Q
11	6	4	Christina Hering	Germany	2:01.13	q
12	1	7	Eglė Balčiūnaitė	Lithuania	2:01.21	Q, SB
13	6	2	Hanna Hermansson	Sweden	2:01.25	q
14	2	9	Shelayna Oskan-Clarke	Great Britain & N.I.	2:01.30	Q
15	3	7	Caster Semenya	South Africa	2:01.33	Q
16	3	2	Rose Mary Almanza	Cuba	2:01.43	Q
17	1	2	Sanne Verstegen	Netherlands	2:01.50	q
18	3	8	Joanna Jóźwik	Poland	2:01.51	Q
19	2	6	Brenda Martinez	United States	2:01.53	q
20	6	6	Gena Löfstrand	South Africa	2:01.73	q
21	3	3	Angie Petty	New Zealand	2:01.76	
22	3	6	Natoya Goule	Jamaica	2:01.77	
23	4	7	Halimah Nakaayi	Uganda	2:01.80	Q
24	4	9	Maryna Arzamasova	Belarus	2:01.92	SB
25	4	2	Mahlet Mulugeta	Ethiopia	2:02.04	
26	4	8	Olha Lyakhova	Ukraine	2:02.07	
27	2	4	Esther Guerrero	Spain	2:02.22	
28	3	4	Brittany McGowan	Australia	2:02.25	
29	1	8	Winnie Nanyondo	Uganda	2:02.65	
30	2	2	Emily Cherotich Tuei	Kenya	2:02.70	
31	5	6	Charlene Lipsey	United States	2:02.74	Q
32	4	3	Yusneysi Santiusti	Italy	2:02.75	
33	5	2	Hedda Hynne	Norway	2:02.85	Q
34	5	7	Dorcus Ajok	Uganda	2:02.98	Q
35	1	3	Kore Tola	Ethiopia	2:03.01	
36	4	5	Lindsey Butterworth	Canada	2:03.19	
37	5	9	Aníta Hinriksdóttir	Iceland	2:03.45	
38	5	5	Georgia Griffith	Australia	2:03.54	
39	3	5	Annie LeBlanc	Canada	2:04.06	
40	5	3	Síofra Cléirigh Büttner	Ireland	2:06.54	
41	2	8	Lora Storey	Australia	2:07.17	
42	1	5	Johana Arrieta	Colombia	2:07.36	
43	2	7	Nimali Liyanarachchi	Sri Lanka	2:08.49	
44	5	4	Kimarra McDonald	Jamaica	2:09.19	
45	6	8	Rose Lokonyen	Athlete Refugee Team	2:20.06	SB
	1	9	Lovisa Lindh	Sweden	DNS	
	5	8	Eunice Sum	Kenya	DNS	

=== Semifinals ===
The semifinals took place on 11 August in three heats as follows:

Heat	1	2	3
Start time	19:35	19:45	19:55
Photo finish	link	link	link

The first two in each heat ( Q ) and the next two fastest ( q ) qualified for the final. The overall results were as follows:

Rank	Heat	Lane	Name	Nationality	Time	Notes
1	2	6	Caster Semenya	South Africa	1:58.90	Q
2	1	4	Ajeé Wilson	United States	1:59.21	Q
3	2	3	Angelika Cichocka	Poland	1:59.32	Q, SB
4	2	7	Charlene Lipsey	United States	1:59.35	q
5	2	5	Lynsey Sharp	Great Britain & N.I.	1:59.47	q
6	1	7	Melissa Bishop	Canada	1:59.56	Q
7	1	3	Noélie Yarigo	Benin	1:59.74	SB
8	1	6	Rose Mary Almanza	Cuba	1:59.79	
9	2	4	Selina Büchel	Switzerland	1:59.85	
10	1	8	Hedda Hynne	Norway	1:59.88	
11	1	9	Adelle Tracey	Great Britain & N.I.	2:00.26	SB
12	1	2	Hanna Hermansson	Sweden	2:00.43	PB
13	2	2	Eglė Balčiūnaitė	Lithuania	2:00.48	SB
14	1	5	Habitam Alemu	Ethiopia	2:00.69	
15	2	9	Sanne Verstegen	Netherlands	2:00.92	
16	3	5	Francine Niyonsaba	Burundi	2:01.11	Q
17	3	7	Margaret Wambui	Kenya	2:01.19	Q
18	3	4	Brenda Martinez	United States	2:01.31	
19	3	2	Halimah Nakaayi	Uganda	2:01.74	
20	3	6	Joanna Jóźwik	Poland	2:01.91	
21	2	8	Dorcus Ajok	Uganda	2:02.00	
22	3	8	Shelayna Oskan-Clarke	Great Britain & N.I.	2:02.26	
23	3	9	Christina Hering	Germany	2:02.69	
24	3	3	Gena Löfstrand	South Africa	2:03.67	

=== Final ===
The final took place on 13 August at 20:10. The results were as follows: (photo finish)

Rank	Lane	Name	Nationality	Time	Notes	Split Time	
Rank	Lane	Name	Nationality	Time	Notes	1st 400m	2nd 400m
1st place, gold medalist(s)	4	Caster Semenya	South Africa	1:55.16	WL	0:58:53	0:56:63
2nd place, silver medalist(s)	7	Francine Niyonsaba	Burundi	1:55.92		0:57:98	0:57:94
3rd place, bronze medalist(s)	5	Ajeé Wilson	United States	1:56.65		0:58:21	0:58:44
4	9	Margaret Wambui	Kenya	1:57.54		0:58.36	0:59:18
5	6	Melissa Bishop	Canada	1:57.68		0:58:51	0:59:17
6	3	Angelika Cichocka	Poland	1:58.41	PB	0:58:82	0:59:59
7	8	Charlene Lipsey	United States	1:58.73		0:58:77	0:59:96
8	2	Lynsey Sharp	Great Britain & N.I.	1:58.98		0:58:42	1:00:56
