= Ethiopia at the 2017 World Championships in Athletics =

- WA code: ETH

in London
- Competitors: 46 in 13 events
- Medals Ranked 7th: Gold 2 Silver 3 Bronze 0 Total 5

World Championships in Athletics appearances
- 1983; 1987; 1991; 1993; 1995; 1997; 1999; 2001; 2003; 2005; 2007; 2009; 2011; 2013; 2015; 2017; 2019; 2022; 2023

Ethiopia competed at the 2017 World Championships in Athletics in London, United Kingdom, from 4–13 August 2017.

== Medalists ==
Medal	Athlete	Event	Date
Gold	Almaz Ayana	Women's 10,000 m	August 5
Gold	Muktar Edris	Men's 5,000 m	August 12
Silver	Tirunesh Dibaba	Women's 10,000 m	August 5
Silver	Tamirat Tola	Men's marathon	August 6
Silver	Almaz Ayana	Women's 5,000 m	August 13

== Results ==
(q – qualified, NM – no mark, SB – season best)

=== Men ===
Track and road events

Athlete	Event	Heat		Semifinal		Final	
Athlete	Event	Result	Rank	Result	Rank	Result	Rank
Mohammed Aman	800 metres	1:45.81	7 Q	1:45.40 SB	2 Q	1:46.06	6
Chala Regassa	1500 metres	DNS	–	Did not advance			
Samuel Tefera	1500 metres	3:46.22	31	Did not advance			
Taresa Tolosa	1500 metres	DNF	–	Did not advance			
Selemon Barega	5000 metres	13:21.50	1 Q	—		13:35.34	5
Muktar Edris	5000 metres	13:30.22	16 Q	—		13:32.79	1st place, gold medalist(s)
Hagos Gebrhiwet	5000 metres	DNS	–	—		Did not advance	
Yomif Kejelcha	5000 metres	13:30.07	14 Q	—		13:33.51	4
Andamlak Belihu	10,000 metres	—				27:08.94 PB	10
Abadi Hadis	10,000 metres	—				26:59.19 SB	7
Jemal Yimer	10,000 metres	—				26:56.11 PB	5
Tsegaye Mekonnen	Marathon	—				2:15:36	19
Tamirat Tola	Marathon	—				2:09:49	2nd place, silver medalist(s)
Yemane Tsegay	Marathon	—				DNF	–
Tesfaye Deriba	3000 metres steeplechase	8:25.33	15 q	—		8:22.12	7
Tafese Seboka	3000 metres steeplechase	8:20.48	2 Q	—		8:23.02	8
Getnet Wale	3000 metres steeplechase	8:23.00	7 Q	—		8:25.28	9

=== Women ===
Track and road events

Athlete	Event	Heat		Semifinal		Final	
Athlete	Event	Result	Rank	Result	Rank	Result	Rank
Habitam Alemu	800 metres	2:00.07	2 Q	2:00.69	14	Did not advance	
Mahlet Mulugeta	800 metres	2:02.04	25	Did not advance			
Kore Tola	800 metres	2:03.01	35	Did not advance			
Genzebe Dibaba	1500 metres	4:02.67	1 Q	4:05.33	8 q	4:06.72	12
Besu Sado	1500 metres	4:03.55	9 Q	4:07.65	19	Did not advance	
Gudaf Tsegay	1500 metres	4:08.96	25 Q	4:22.01	24	Did not advance	
Fantu Worku	1500 metres	4:05.81 PB	19	Did not advance			
Almaz Ayana	5000 metres	14:57.06 SB	2 Q	—		14:40.35 SB	2nd place, silver medalist(s)
Genzebe Dibaba	5000 metres	DNS	–	—		Did not advance	
Letesenbet Gidey	5000 metres	14:59.34	7 Q	—		15:04.99	11
Senbere Teferi	5000 metres	14:57.23	3 Q	—		14:47.45	4
Almaz Ayana	10,000 metres	—				30:16.32 WL	1st place, gold medalist(s)
Tirunesh Dibaba	10,000 metres	—				31:02.69 SB	2nd place, silver medalist(s)
Dera Dida	10,000 metres	—				31:51.75	14
Shure Demise	Marathon	—				2:27:58	5
Mare Dibaba	Marathon	—				2:28:49 SB	8
Berhane Dibaba	Marathon	—				2:29:01	10
Aselefech Mergia	Marathon	—				2:29:43	12
Sofia Assefa	3000 metres steeplechase	9:40.88	19	—		Did not advance	
Etenesh Diro	3000 metres steeplechase	9:31.87	10 q	—		9:22.46	7
Birtukan Fente	3000 metres steeplechase	9:33.99 SB	11 q	—		DNS	–
Yehualeye Beletew	20 kilometres walk	—				1:37:55	44
Askale Tiksa	20 kilometres walk	—				DNS	–
