= Belarus at the 2017 World Championships in Athletics =

- Flag of Belarus
- WA code: BLR
- National federation: Belarus Athletic Federation
- Website: bfla.eu (in Russian)

in London, United Kingdom 4–13 August 2017
- Competitors: 16 (7 men and 9 women) in 11 events
- Medals: Gold 0 Silver 0 Bronze 0 Total 0

World Championships in Athletics appearances
- 1993; 1995; 1997; 1999; 2001; 2003; 2005; 2007; 2009; 2011; 2013; 2015; 2017; 2019; 2022–2025

Belarus competed at the 2017 World Championships in Athletics in London, United Kingdom, 4–13 August 2017.

== Results ==
=== Men ===
Track and road events

| Athlete | Event | Heat | | Semifinal | | Final | |
| Athlete | Event | Result | Rank | Result | Rank | Result | Rank |
|---|---|---|---|---|---|---|---|
| Dzmitry Dziubin | 20 kilometres walk | —N/a | | | | 1:25:41 | 49 |
| Aliaksandr Liakhovich | 20 kilometres walk | —N/a | | | | 1:21:39 | 28 |

Field events

| Athlete | Event | Qualification | | Final | |
| Athlete | Event | Distance | Position | Distance | Position |
|---|---|---|---|---|---|
| Aliaksei Nichypar | Shot put | 19.54 | 28 | Did not advance | |
| Pavel Bareisha | Hammer throw | 75.98 | 4 Q | 75.86 | 9 |
| Siarhei Kalamoyets | Hammer throw | 71.90 | 22 | Did not advance | |
| Zakhar Makhrosenka | Hammer throw | 72.58 | 18 | Did not advance | |
| Pavel Mialeshka | Javelin throw | 75.33 | 27 | Did not advance | |

=== Women ===
Track and road events

| Athlete | Event | Heat | | Semifinal | | Final | |
| Athlete | Event | Result | Rank | Result | Rank | Result | Rank |
|---|---|---|---|---|---|---|---|
| Maryna Arzamasova | 800 metres | 2:01.92 SB | 24 | Did not advance | | | |
| Elvira Herman | 100 metres hurdles | 13.01 | 17 Q | 13.16 | 19 | Did not advance | |
| Alina Talay | 100 metres hurdles | 12.88 SB | 8 Q | 12.85 SB | 7 Q | 12.81 SB | 6 |
| Nastassia Yatsevich | 20 kilometres walk | —N/a | | | | 1:32:22 SB | 26 |

Field events

| Athlete | Event | Qualification | | Final | |
| Athlete | Event | Distance | Position | Distance | Position |
|---|---|---|---|---|---|
| Iryna Zhuk | Pole vault | NH | – | Did not advance | |
| Aliona Dubitskaya | Shot put | 17.68 | 14 | Did not advance | |
| Yuliya Leantsiuk | Shot put | 18.01 | 7 q | 18.12 | 7 |
| Hanna Malyshchyk | Hammer throw | 72.79 | 4 Q | 69.43 | 10 |
| Tatsiana Khaladovich | Javelin throw | 62.58 | 11 q | 64.05 | 6 |
