= 2017 World Championships in Athletics – Men's 5000 metres =

Men's 5000 metres at the 2017 World Championships
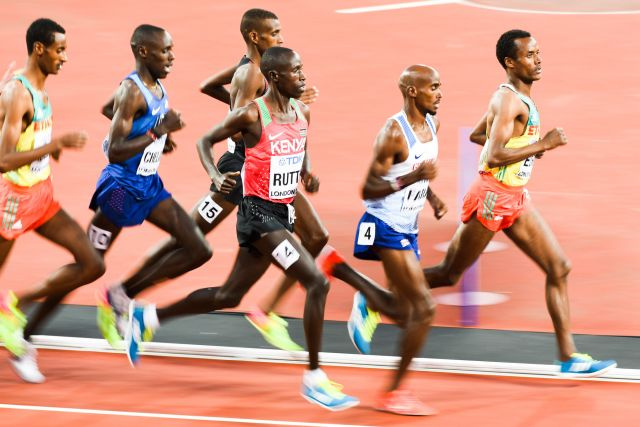
- The final.
- Venue: Olympic Stadium
- Dates: 9 August (heats); 12 August (final)
- Competitors: 40 from 23 nations
- Winning time: 13:32.79

Medalists
gold medal	Muktar Edris	Ethiopia
silver medal	Mo Farah	Great Britain
bronze medal	Paul Chelimo	United States

Video on YouTube Official Video

The men's 5000 metres at the 2017 World Championships in Athletics was held at the London Olympic Stadium on 9−12 August. This race was announced as the last track race of Mo Farah's career as he intends to focus on marathon running and road racing. Farah had been in every final since 2007, winning three straight since 2011.

== Summary ==
In the final, Farah (GBR) started faster than normal, after the pack congealed landing in second place behind Paul Chelimo (USA) who ran around the crowd to get to the front. Chelimo took the field through an aggressive 62 second lap. The second lap was a decidedly more relaxed 71 seconds, bringing Andrew Butchart (GBR) to the front, to look at Chelimo then take the point with his teammate Farah in tow. But Butchart didn't increase the pace, instead it slowed slightly to 72 seconds. Muktar Edris (ETH) came forward. After running shoulder to shoulder with Farah for 200 metres, Edris went out into the lead, but the pace didn't quicken. After another slow lap, he slowed and left Farah exposed on the front. 17 year old 2016 World Junior Champion Selemon Barega came from the back of the pack to take the lead. Barega increased the pace opening up several metres on Farah at the head of the pack with a 65-second lap, then he slowed again an Ethiopian leaving Farah exposed on the front of the pack. Another 66 second lap as Chelimo came back to take a turn at the front.

With five laps to go Patrick Tiernan ran around the field to take the lead. Tiernan moved the pace up to 64 seconds but the rest of the field didn't chase, letting him break away to a 10-metre lead. The next lap was under 63 seconds, with Yomif Kejelcha (ETH) coming to the front of the pack but leaving Farah to lead the group. Into the last two laps, a time when Farah does not like to get passed, he stayed ahead of Kejelcha, the overall quicken pace overtaking Tiernan with 600 metres to go. Shortly after passing Tiernan, Butchart rushed forward to get on Farah's shoulder to form a British wall similar to the ending stages of the Olympics. Through the turn, Kejelcha fought his way around the outside of the wall and onto the homestretch to take the lead going into the bell with the rest of the Ethiopian team, Edris and Barega lining up on the outside, next to Farah, Mohammed Ahmed (CAN), and Chelimo on the inside. At the bell, Edris was shoulder to shoulder with Farah.

Through the penultimate turn, Edris got ahead of Farah and onto the back of Kejelcha. The two Ethiopians opened up a 2-metre lead on Farah on the backstretch, leaving Farah in the unfamiliar position of having to sprint to catch up. But Chelimo had more speed, catching Farah from behind and moving to his outside shoulder as they gained on the Ethiopian duo, effectively leaving Farah boxed in on the curb. Coming off the final turn, Farah was looking for running room, which suddenly materialized in front of him as Kejelcha drifted out. Edris sprinted away from his teammate while Farah was still weaving his way past Kejelcha, with Chelimo going the outside route, both two metres behind Edris. Farah's race was for second place, with Edris expanding his lead to the finish. Farah was able to barely hold off Chelimo for silver. Unlike the spring in his step following his previous string of victories, it was Farah lying exhausted on the track.

== Records ==
Before the competition records were as follows:

Record	Perf.	Athlete	Nat.	Date	Location
World	12:37.35	Kenenisa Bekele	ETH	31 May 2004	Hengelo, Netherlands
Championship	12:52.79	Eliud Kipchoge	KEN	31 Aug 2003	Saint-Denis, France
World leading	12:55.23	Muktar Edris	ETH	6 Jul 2017	Lausanne, Switzerland
African	12:37.35	Kenenisa Bekele	ETH	31 May 2004	Hengelo, Netherlands
Asian	12:51.96	Albert Kibichii Rop	BHR	19 Jul 2013	Monaco
NACAC	12:53.60	Bernard Lagat	USA	22 Jul 2011	Monaco
South American	13:19.43	Marilson dos Santos	BRA	8 Jun 2006	Kassel, Germany
European	12:49.71	Mohammed Mourhit	BEL	25 Aug 2000	Brussels, Belgium
Oceanian	12:55.76	Craig Mottram	AUS	30 Jul 2004	London, Great Britain

No records were set at the competition.

== Qualification standard ==
The standard to qualify automatically for entry was 13:22.60.

== Schedule ==
The event schedule, in local time (UTC+1), is as follows:

Date	Time	Round
9 August	20:05	Heats
12 August	20:20	Final

== Results ==
=== Heats ===
The first round took place on 9 August in two heats as follows:

Heat	1	2
Start time	20:06	20:29
Photo finish	link	link

The first five in each heat ( Q ) and the next five fastest ( q ) qualified for the final. The overall results were as follows:

Rank	Heat	Name	Nationality	Time	Notes
1	2	Selemon Barega	Ethiopia	13:21.50	Q
2	2	Birhanu Balew	Bahrain	13:21.91	Q
3	2	Cyrus Rutto	Kenya	13:22.45	Q
4	2	Patrick Tiernan	Australia	13:22.52	Q
5	2	Ryan Hill	United States	13:22.79	Q
6	2	Mohammed Ahmed	Canada	13:22.97	q
7	2	Andrew Butchart	Great Britain & N.I.	13:24.78	q
8	2	Paul Chelimo	United States	13:24.88	q
9	2	Kemoy Campbell	Jamaica	13:26.67	q
10	2	Awet Habte	Eritrea	13:27.70	q
11	2	Soufiane Bouchikhi	Belgium	13:28.64	
12	2	Jamal Abdi Dirieh	Djibouti	13:28.98	
13	2	Zouhair Aouad	Bahrain	13:29.28	
14	1	Yomif Kejelcha	Ethiopia	13:30.07	Q
15	1	Mo Farah	Great Britain & N.I.	13:30.18	Q
16	1	Muktar Edris	Ethiopia	13:30.22	Q
17	1	Justyn Knight	Canada	13:30.27	Q
18	1	Aron Kifle	Eritrea	13:30.36	Q
19	1	Bashir Abdi	Belgium	13:30.71	
20	1	Morgan McDonald	Australia	13:30.73	
21	1	Soufiyan Bouqantar	Morocco	13:30.78	
22	1	Jacob Kiplimo	Uganda	13:30.92	
23	1	Eric Jenkins	United States	13:31.09	
24	1	Sam McEntee	Australia	13:31.58	
25	2	Sondre Nordstad Moen	Norway	13:31.71	
26	1	Hayle Ibrahimov	Azerbaijan	13:32.15	
27	1	Emanuel Giniki Gisamoda	Tanzania	13:32.31	
28	1	Albert Kibichii Rop	Bahrain	13:32.40	
29	2	Stephen Kissa	Uganda	13:32.86	
30	2	Josphat Kiprono Menjo	Kenya	13:35.68	
31	1	Govindan Lakshmanan	India	13:35.69	PB
32	2	Richard Ringer	Germany	13:36.87	
33	1	Ilias Fifa	Spain	13:47.90	
34	2	Marc Scott	Great Britain & N.I.	13:58.11	
35	1	Kadar Omar Abdullahi	Athlete Refugee Team	14:32.67	PB
36	1	Mohamed Daud Mohamed	Somalia	14:34.27	PB
37	1	Davis Kiplangat	Kenya	14:52.98	
38	1	David Kulang	South Sudan	14:53.19	SB
39	1	Mohamed Sambe	Mauritania	16:16.29	PB
	2	Brahim Kaazouzi	Morocco	DNF	
	2	Gabriel Gerald Geay	Tanzania	DNS	
	2	Hagos Gebrhiwet	Ethiopia	DNS	

=== Final ===
The final took place on 12 August at 20:21. The results were as follows (photo finish):

Rank	Name	Nationality	Time	Notes
1st place, gold medalist(s)	Muktar Edris	Ethiopia	13:32.79	
2nd place, silver medalist(s)	Mo Farah	Great Britain & N.I.	13:33.22	
3rd place, bronze medalist(s)	Paul Chelimo	United States	13:33.30	
4	Yomif Kejelcha	Ethiopia	13:33.51	
5	Selemon Barega	Ethiopia	13:35.34	
6	Mohammed Ahmed	Canada	13:35.43	
7	Aron Kifle	Eritrea	13:36.91	
8	Andrew Butchart	Great Britain & N.I.	13:38.73	
9	Justyn Knight	Canada	13:39.15	
10	Kemoy Campbell	Jamaica	13:39.74	
11	Patrick Tiernan	Australia	13:40.01	
12	Birhanu Balew	Bahrain	13:43.25	
13	Cyrus Rutto	Kenya	13:48.64	
14	Awet Habte	Eritrea	13:58.68	
	Ryan Hill	United States	DNS	
