= Eritrea at the 2013 World Championships in Athletics =

- WA code: ERI
- National federation: Eritrean National Athletics Federation

in Moscow
- Competitors: 10
- Medals: Gold 0 Silver 0 Bronze 0 Total 0

World Championships in Athletics appearances
- 1997; 1999; 2001; 2003; 2005; 2007; 2009; 2011; 2013; 2015; 2017; 2019; 2022; 2023

Eritrea competed at the 2013 World Championships in Athletics in Moscow, Russia, from 10 to 18 August 2013. A team of 10 athletes was announced to represent the country in the event.

== Results ==
(q – qualified, NM – no mark, SB – season best)

=== Men ===
Track and road events

Athlete	Event	Preliminaries		Heats		Semifinals		Final	
Athlete	Event	Time	Rank	Time	Rank	Time	Rank	Time	Rank
Nguse Amlosom	10000 metres							27:29.21 SB	8
Goitom Kifle	10000 metres							27:56.38	17
Teklemariam Medhin	10000 metres							Did not finish	
Yared Asmerom	Marathon							Did not finish	
Beraki Beyene	Marathon							2:13:40 SB	11
Yonas Kifle	Marathon							Did not finish	
Kiflom Suim	Marathon							2:20:01	31
Samuel Tsegay	Marathon							2:14:41 SB	16

=== Women ===
Track and road events

Athlete	Event	Preliminaries		Heats		Semifinals		Final	
Athlete	Event	Time	Rank	Time	Rank	Time	Rank	Time	Rank
Nebiat Habtemariam	Marathon							Disqualified	
