= 2017 World Championships in Athletics – Men's 20 kilometres walk =

Men's 20 kilometres walk at the 2017 World Championships
- Venue: Olympic Stadium
- Dates: 13 August (final)
- Competitors: 64 from 32 nations
- Winning time: 1:18:53

Medalists
gold medal	Éider Arévalo	Colombia
silver medal	Sergey Shirobokov	Authorised Neutral Athletes
bronze medal	Caio Bonfim	Brazil

The men's 20 kilometres race walk at the 2017 World Championships in Athletics was held on a two kilometre course comprising lengths of The Mall between Buckingham Palace and Admiralty Arch on 13 August 2017.

The winning margin was two seconds which was also the winning margin in this event at the 2001 edition of these championships. As of 2024, these are the only two occasions where this event has been won by less than seven seconds at these championships.

== Summary ==
As is typical, this race started off as a pack. By five km, the pack still numbered 32, exactly half the starters, walking a leisurely (for them) 19:54. The second five km was exactly the same, passed in 39:48 but the pack had worn down to 17. British champion, walking before the home crowd, accelerated the pace, dropping many off the pack. But out in front, Bosworth was given more scrutiny and earned the deadly red card disqualifying him from the race. By 15 km in 59:33 (19:45), the pack was down to eight and defending champion Miguel Ángel López (Spain) was no longer one of them. Rallying from a 23-second deficit at ten km, South African Lebogang Shange came back to the group as others dropped off. By the last two km loop, the leaders Éider Arévalo (Colombia) and Sergey Shirobokov, an Authorised Neutral Athlete were in racewalking's version of a sprint finish, dropping Shange, Christopher Linke (Germany), Dane Bird-Smith (Australia), Wang Kaihua (China) and Caio Bonfim (Brazil) to fight for bronze. Arévalo broke the race open enough to get a Colombian flag from the audience, holding it around his neck as he made sure he had enough of a gap on Shirobokov, then crossing the finish line with the flag held high two seconds ahead. Nine seconds behind them, Bonfim had broken away from Shange to secure bronze. Arévalo, Bonfim and Shange all set national records.

== Records ==
Before the competition records were as follows:

Record	Perf.	Athlete	Nat.	Date	Location
World	1:16:36	Yusuke Suzuki	JPN	15 Mar 2015	Nomi, Japan
Championship	1:17:21	Jefferson Pérez	ECU	23 Aug 2003	Saint-Denis, France
World leading	1:17:54	Wang Kaihua	CHN	4 Mar 2017	Huangshan, China
African	1:19:02	Hatem Ghoula	TUN	10 May 1997	Eisenhüttenstadt, Germany
Asian	1:16:36	Yusuke Suzuki	JPN	15 Mar 2015	Nomi, Japan
NACAC	1:17:46	Julio René Martínez	GUA	8 May 1999	Eisenhüttenstadt, Germany
South American	1:17:21	Jefferson Pérez	ECU	23 Aug 2003	Saint-Denis, France
European	1:17:02	Yohann Diniz	FRA	8 Mar 2015	Arles, France
Oceanian	1:17:33	Nathan Deakes	AUS	23 Apr 2015	Cixi, China

The following records were set at the competition:

Record	Perf.	Athlete	Nat.	Date
Brazilian	1:19:04	Caio Bonfim	BRA	13 Aug 2017
South African	1:19:18	Lebogang Shange	RSA	13 Aug 2017
Colombian	1:18:53	Éider Arévalo	COL	13 Aug 2017

== Qualification standard ==
The standard to qualify automatically for entry was 1:24:00.

== Results ==
The final took place on 13 August at 14:19. The results were as follows:

Rank	Name	Nationality	Time	Notes
1st place, gold medalist(s)	Éider Arévalo	Colombia	1:18:53	NR
2nd place, silver medalist(s)	Sergey Shirobokov	Authorised Neutral Athletes	1:18:55	
3rd place, bronze medalist(s)	Caio Bonfim	Brazil	1:19:04	NR
4	Lebogang Shange	South Africa	1:19:18	NR
5	Christopher Linke	Germany	1:19:21	
6	Dane Bird-Smith	Australia	1:19:28	PB
7	Wang Kaihua	China	1:19:30	
8	Álvaro Martín	Spain	1:19:41	SB
9	Alberto Amezcua	Spain	1:19:46	PB
10	Miguel Ángel López	Spain	1:19:57	SB
11	Isamu Fujisawa	Japan	1:20:04	
12	Artur Brzozowski	Poland	1:20:33	PB
13	Diego García	Spain	1:20:34	PB
14	Eiki Takahashi	Japan	1:20:36	
15	Nils Brembach	Germany	1:20:42	PB
16	Giorgio Rubino	Italy	1:20:47	SB
17	Hagen Pohle	Germany	1:20:53	SB
18	Brian Pintado	Ecuador	1:21:17	PB
19	Jin Xiangqian	China	1:21:24	
20	Damian Błocki	Poland	1:21:29	PB
21	Érick Barrondo	Guatemala	1:21:34	SB
22	Aliaksandr Liakhovich	Belarus	1:21:39	
23	Irfan Kolothum Thodi	India	1:21:40	
24	Kévin Campion	France	1:21:46	
25	Francesco Fortunato	Italy	1:22:01	PB
26	Kim Hyun-sub	South Korea	1:22:08	
27	Ruslan Dmytrenko	Ukraine	1:22:26	SB
28	Mauricio Arteaga	Ecuador	1:22:28	SB
29	Marius Žiūkas	Lithuania	1:22:38	
30	Samuel Gathimba	Kenya	1:22:52	SB
31	Choe Byeong-kwang	South Korea	1:22:54	SB
32	Ivan Losev	Ukraine	1:23:03	SB
33	César Rodríguez	Peru	1:23:05	PB
34	Wang Rui	China	1:23:09	
35	Jesús Tadeo Vega	Mexico	1:23:10	SB
36	Georgiy Sheiko	Kazakhstan	1:23:11	
37	Perseus Karlström	Sweden	1:23:36	
38	Daisuke Matsunaga	Japan	1:23:39	
39	Yerko Araya	Chile	1:23:46	
40	José Alejandro Barrondo	Guatemala	1:23:47	
41	Callum Wilkinson	Great Britain & N.I.	1:23:54	
42	Alexandros Papamichail	Greece	1:23:56	
43	Pedro Daniel Gómez	Mexico	1:24:11	
44	Anatole Ibáñez	Sweden	1:24:23	SB
45	Ersin Tacir	Turkey	1:24:43	
46	Juan Manuel Cano	Argentina	1:24:49	
47	Manuel Esteban Soto	Colombia	1:24:56	
48	Matteo Giupponi	Italy	1:25:20	SB
49	Dzmitry Dziubin	Belarus	1:25:41	
50	Devender Singh	India	1:25:47	
51	Benjamin Thorne	Canada	1:26:56	
52	José María Raymundo	Guatemala	1:27:09	
53	Jakub Jelonek	Poland	1:27:43	
54	Ganapathi Krishnan	India	1:28:32	
55	Serhiy Budza	Ukraine	1:29:25	
56	Rhydian Cowley	Australia	1:30:40	
57	Kim Dae-ho	South Korea	1:30:41	
58	Mert Atlı	Turkey	1:31:26	
	Salih Korkmaz	Turkey	DNF	
	Eder Sánchez	Mexico	DNF	
	Simon Wachira	Kenya	DNF	
	Tom Bosworth	Great Britain & N.I.	DQ	230.6(a)
	Alex Wright	Ireland	DQ	230.6(a)
	Richard Vargas	Venezuela	DQ	230.6(a)
