= Norway at the 2017 World Championships in Athletics =

- WA code: NOR

in London
- Competitors: 13 in 15 events
- Medals Ranked =17th: Gold 1 Silver 0 Bronze 1 Total 2

World Championships in Athletics appearances (overview)
- 1980; 1983; 1987; 1991; 1993; 1995; 1997; 1999; 2001; 2003; 2005; 2007; 2009; 2011; 2013; 2015; 2017; 2019; 2022; 2023; 2025

Norway competed at the 2017 World Championships in Athletics in London, United Kingdom, from 4–13 August 2017.

== Medalists ==
The following competitors from Norway won medals at the Championships.

Medal	Athlete	Event	Date
Gold	Karsten Warholm	400 metres hurdles	9 August
Bronze	Filip Ingebrigtsen	1500 metres	13 August

== Results ==
(q – qualified, NM – no mark, SB – season best)

=== Men ===
Track and road events

Athlete	Event	Heat		Semifinal		Final	
Athlete	Event	Result	Rank	Result	Rank	Result	Rank
Jonathan Quarcoo	200 metres	20.60	25	Did not advance			
Filip Ingebrigtsen	1500 metres	3:38.46	3 Q	3:40.23	14 Q	3:34.53	3rd place, bronze medalist(s)
Sondre Nordstad Moen	5000 metres	13:31.71	25	—N/a		Did not advance	
Karsten Warholm	400 metres hurdles	49.50	10 Q	48.43	2 Q	48.35	1st place, gold medalist(s)
Jakob Ingebrigtsen	3000 metres steeplechase	8:34.88	27	—N/a		Did not advance	
Håvard Haukenes	50 kilometres walk	—N/a				DQ	–

Field events

Athlete	Event	Qualification		Final	
Athlete	Event	Distance	Position	Distance	Position
Sven Martin Skagestad	Discus throw	58.86	26	Did not advance	

Combined events – Decathlon

Athlete	Event	100 m	LJ	SP	HJ	400 m	110H	DT	PV	JT	1500 m	Final	Rank
Martin Roe	Result	10.90	7.50 PB	15.22	1.93	49.09 SB	15.15 PB	48.24	4.50 SB	58.30	4:39.24	8040	12
Martin Roe	Points	883	935	803	740	857	831	834	760	712	685	8040	12

=== Women ===
Track and road events

Athlete	Event	Heat		Semifinal		Final	
Athlete	Event	Result	Rank	Result	Rank	Result	Rank
Amalie Iuel	400 metres	52.55	33	Did not advance			
Hedda Hynne	800 metres	2:02.85	33 Q	1:59.88	10	Did not advance	
Karoline Bjerkeli Grøvdal	1500 metres	4:09.56	31	Did not advance			
Karoline Bjerkeli Grøvdal	5000 metres	15:00.44 SB	13 q	—N/a		DNF	–
Isabelle Pedersen	100 metres hurdles	12.94	11 Q	12.87	9	Did not advance	
Amalie Iuel	400 metres hurdles	56.42	23	Did not advance			

Field events

Athlete	Event	Qualification		Final	
Athlete	Event	Distance	Position	Distance	Position
Sigrid Borge	Javelin throw	55.08	27	Did not advance	
