= 2017 World Championships in Athletics – Men's 800 metres =

Men's 800 metres at the 2017 World Championships
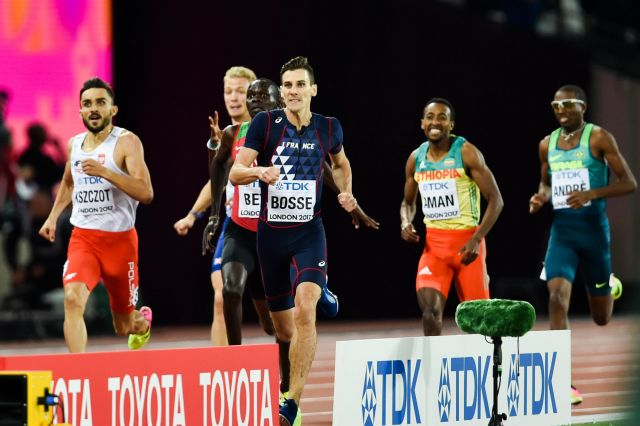
- The last stages of the final.
- Venue: Olympic Stadium
- Dates: 5 August (heats); 6 August (semifinal); 8 August (final)
- Competitors: 47 from 34 nations
- Winning time: 1:44.67

Medalists
gold medal	Pierre-Ambroise Bosse	France
silver medal	Adam Kszczot	Poland
bronze medal	Kipyegon Bett	Kenya

Video on YouTube Official Video

The men's 800 metres at the 2017 World Championships in Athletics was held at the London Olympic Stadium on 5, 6, and 8 August.

== Summary ==
Defending champion David Rudisha (Kenya) couldn't recover from an early season injury in time to return. There were no Olympic podium athletes in this field. The returning silver medalist Adam Kszczot (Poland) made an impressive move in his semi-final to get into the final. The returning bronze medalist, 2015 phenom Amel Tuka (Bosnia and Herzegovina) didn't make it out of the heats. The fastest athlete of the year Emmanuel Kipkurui Korir didn't qualify from his semi.

As the final began, the runner with the fastest personal best, =#3 all time Nigel Amos (Botswana) ran a fast turn and was attempting to take the tangent from the break line in his lane 5, but Brandon McBride (Canada), ran a faster turn and cut more sharply from lane 7, effectively interrupting Amos from taking control of the early pace. Looking for running room Amos also cut in, tangling elbows with Kipyegon Bett (Kenya), then bouncing to the side, getting caught also behind Thiago André (Brazil). McBride held the lead with André in his shadow. The first time down the home stretch, Amos moved outside to get around André into second place. McBride led through a moderate 50.76 first lap. Through the next turn, Bett was looking to get past Amos, finally also running wide on the backstretch, getting past McBride. From the back of the pack, Pierre-Ambroise Bosse (France) had avoided the battle so far. He went wider on the backstretch, running in lane 3 past the field, including the battling leaders, taking the lead unencumbered as they entered the final turn. Through the final turn, the battle continued behind him, Amos and Bett exchanging elbows again. From near the back of the back Adam Kszczot (Poland) began his kick, with Kyle Langford (GBR) in his wake, passing people. By the time he reached the final straightaway, Bosse had a 3 metre lead on Bett, with Amos another metre back. Bett and Amos were unable to gain on Bosse, but in lane 2, Kszczot and Langford were, passing people including Mohammed Aman (Ethiopia), Amos and 10 metres before the finish, Kszczot passed Bett to capture silver. Bett barely held off a fast closing Langford for bronze.

After the race, Bosse looked at the video scoreboard, pointing at himself in surprise at his win.

== Records ==
Before the competition records were as follows:

Record	Perf.	Athlete	Nat.	Date	Location
World	1:40.91	David Lekuta Rudisha	KEN	9 Aug 2012	London, Great Britain
Championship	1:43.06	Billy Konchellah	KEN	1 Sep 1987	Rome, Italy
World leading	1:43.10	Emmanuel Kipkurui Korir	KEN	21 Jul 2017	Monaco
African	1:40.91	David Lekuta Rudisha	KEN	9 Aug 2012	London, Great Britain
Asian	1:42.79	Yusuf Saad Kamel	BHR	29 Jul 2008	Monaco
NACAC	1:42.60	Johnny Gray	USA	28 Aug 1985	Koblenz, West Germany
South American	1:41.77	Joaquim Cruz	BRA	26 Aug 1984	Cologne, West Germany
European	1:41.11	Wilson Kipketer	DEN	24 Aug 1997	Cologne, Germany
Oceanian	1:44.3	Peter Snell	NZL	3 Feb 1962	Christchurch, New Zealand

No records were set at the competition.

== Qualification standard ==
The standard to qualify automatically for entry was 1:45.90.

== Schedule ==
The event schedule, in local time (UTC+1), was as follows:

Date	Time	Round
5 August	12:45	Heats
6 August	21:15	Semifinals
8 August	21:35	Final

== Results ==
=== Heats ===
The first round took place on 5 August in six heats as follows:

Heat	1	2	3	4	5	6
Start time	12:44	12:53	13:02	13:11	13:20	13:29
Photo finish	link	link	link	link	link	link

The first three in each heat ( Q ) and the next six fastest ( q ) qualified for the semifinals. The overall results were as follows:

Rank	Heat	Lane	Name	Nationality	Time	Notes
1	2	4	Thijmen Kupers	Netherlands	1:45.53	Q
2	6	6	Donavan Brazier	United States	1:45.65	Q
3	2	6	Brandon McBride	Canada	1:45.69	Q
4	1	2	Kipyegon Bett	Kenya	1:45.76	Q
5	2	3	Kevin López	Spain	1:45.77	Q
6	3	9	Ferguson Cheruiyot Rotich	Kenya	1:45.77	Q
7	6	2	Mohammed Aman	Ethiopia	1:45.81	Q
8	3	7	Isaiah Harris	United States	1:45.82	Q
9	3	5	Elliot Giles	Great Britain & N.I.	1:45.86	Q
10	6	8	Guy Learmonth	Great Britain & N.I.	1:45.90	Q
11	2	7	Antoine Gakeme	Burundi	1:45.97	q
12	1	9	Andreas Kramer	Sweden	1:45.98	Q
13	1	6	Drew Windle	United States	1:46.08	Q
14	6	5	Marcin Lewandowski	Poland	1:46.17	q
15	1	3	Abdessalem Ayouni	Tunisia	1:46.19	q
16	3	8	Ebrahim Al-Zofairi	Kuwait	1:46.29	q PB
17	2	2	Kyle Langford	Great Britain & N.I.	1:46.38	q
18	3	2	Álvaro de Arriba	Spain	1:46.42	q
19	1	7	Andrés Arroyo	Puerto Rico	1:46.46	
20	1	5	Edose Ibadin	Nigeria	1:46.51	
21	6	4	Amel Tuka	Bosnia and Herzegovina	1:46.54	
22	2	8	Jesús Tonatiu López	Mexico	1:46.71	
23	3	4	Abdelati El Guesse	Morocco	1:46.74	
24	4	9	Emmanuel Kipkurui Korir	Kenya	1:47.08	Q
25	2	5	Leandro Paris	Argentina	1:47.09	PB
26	4	4	Michał Rozmys	Poland	1:47.09	Q
27	5	7	Nijel Amos	Botswana	1:47.10	Q
28	4	8	Thiago André	Brazil	1:47.22	Q
29	5	9	Pierre-Ambroise Bosse	France	1:47.25	Q
30	5	2	Adam Kszczot	Poland	1:47.36	Q
31	5	6	Mostafa Smaili	Morocco	1:47.50	
32	4	3	Alex Amankwah	Ghana	1:47.56	
33	4	2	Marc Reuther	Germany	1:47.78	
34	5	8	Mark English	Ireland	1:48.01	
35	5	3	Abu Salim Mayanja	Uganda	1:48.11	
36	4	6	Samir Dahmani	France	1:48.62	
37	2	9	Pol Moya	Andorra	1:49.06	
38	4	7	Peter Bol	Australia	1:49.65	
39	6	9	Astrit Kryeziu	Kosovo	1:49.94	
40	4	5	Ahmed Bashir Farah	Athlete Refugee Team	1:50.04	PB
41	3	3	Ryan Sánchez	Puerto Rico	1:50.74	
42	5	4	Francky-Edgard Mbotto	Central African Republic	1:51.76	
43	1	8	Saud Al-Zaabi	United Arab Emirates	1:53.34	
44	1	1	Pyae Sone Maung	Myanmar	2:13.38	
	1	4	Amine Belferar	Algeria	DNF	
	5	5	Hamada Mohamed	Egypt	DNF	
	6	3	Daniel Andújar	Spain	DQ	R 163.2
	3	6	Wesam Al-Massri	Palestine	DNS	
	6	7	Michael Loturomom Saruni	Kenya	DNS	

=== Semifinals ===
The semifinals took place on 6 August in three heats as follows:

Heat	1	2	3
Start time	21:15	21:23	21:32
Photo finish	link	link	link

The first two in each heat ( Q ) and the next two fastest ( q ) qualified for the final. The overall results were as follows:

Rank	Heat	Lane	Name	Nationality	Time	Notes
1	3	6	Kipyegon Bett	Kenya	1:45.02	Q
2	3	3	Mohammed Aman	Ethiopia	1:45.40	Q, SB
3	2	6	Brandon McBride	Canada	1:45.53	Q
4	3	7	Pierre-Ambroise Bosse	France	1:45.63	q
5	2	2	Kyle Langford	Great Britain & N.I.	1:45.81	Q
6	3	5	Thiago André	Brazil	1:45.83	q
7	2	9	Marcin Lewandowski	Poland	1:45.93	
8	2	5	Emmanuel Kipkurui Korir	Kenya	1:46.08	
9	3	2	Michał Rozmys	Poland	1:46.10	
10	1	8	Adam Kszczot	Poland	1:46.24	Q
11	3	8	Andreas Kramer	Sweden	1:46.25	
12	3	4	Donavan Brazier	United States	1:46.27	
13	1	6	Nijel Amos	Botswana	1:46.29	Q
14	2	7	Drew Windle	United States	1:46.33	
15	1	4	Ferguson Cheruiyot Rotich	Kenya	1:46.49	
16	3	9	Álvaro de Arriba	Spain	1:46.64	
17	1	5	Isaiah Harris	United States	1:46.66	
18	2	3	Ebrahim Al-Zofairi	Kuwait	1:46.68	
19	1	2	Guy Learmonth	Great Britain & N.I.	1:46.75	
20	1	7	Elliot Giles	Great Britain & N.I.	1:46.95	
21	2	4	Antoine Gakeme	Burundi	1:47.08	
22	1	3	Abdessalem Ayouni	Tunisia	1:47.39	
23	1	9	Kevin López	Spain	1:47.62	
	2	8	Thijmen Kupers	Netherlands	DNS	

=== Final ===
The final took place on 8 August at 21:36. The results were as follows (photo finish):

Rank	Lane	Name	Nationality	Time	Notes
1st place, gold medalist(s)	4	Pierre-Ambroise Bosse	France	1:44.67	SB
2nd place, silver medalist(s)	8	Adam Kszczot	Poland	1:44.95	SB
3rd place, bronze medalist(s)	6	Kipyegon Bett	Kenya	1:45.21	
4	3	Kyle Langford	Great Britain & N.I.	1:45.25	PB
5	5	Nijel Amos	Botswana	1:45.83	
6	2	Mohammed Aman	Ethiopia	1:46.06	
7	9	Thiago André	Brazil	1:46.30	
8	7	Brandon McBride	Canada	1:47.09	
