= Spain at the 2017 World Championships in Athletics =

- WA code: ESP
- National federation: Real Federación Española de Atletismo
- Website: www.rfea.es

in London, United Kingdom
- Competitors: 56 in 28 events
- Medals: Gold 0 Silver 0 Bronze 0 Total 0

World Championships in Athletics appearances (overview)
- 1976; 1980; 1983; 1987; 1991; 1993; 1995; 1997; 1999; 2001; 2003; 2005; 2007; 2009; 2011; 2013; 2015; 2017; 2019; 2022; 2023; 2025

Spain competed at the 2017 World Championships in Athletics in London, United Kingdom, from 4 to 13 August 2017.

== Results ==
=== Men ===
Track & road events

Athlete	Event	Heat		Semifinal		Final	
Athlete	Event	Result	Rank	Result	Rank	Result	Rank
Lucas Búa	400 metres	46.00	34	Did not advance			
Samuel García	400 metres	46.37	39	Did not advance			
Óscar Husillos	400 metres	45.22 PB	14 Q	45.16 PB	14	Did not advance	
Daniel Andújar	800 metres	DQ	–	Did not advance			
Álvaro de Arriba	800 metres	1:46.42	18 q	1:46.64	16	Did not advance	
Kevin López	800 metres	1:45.77	5 Q	1:47.62	23	Did not advance	
Marc Alcalá	1500 metres	3:43.28	21	Did not advance			
David Bustos	1500 metres	3:47.52	36	Did not advance			
Adel Mechaal	1500 metres	3:38.99	6 Q	3:40.60	16 Q	3:34.71	4
Ilias Fifa	5000 metres	13:47.90	34	—N/a		Did not advance	
Yidiel Contreras	110 metres hurdles	13.40	11 Q	13.65	17	Did not advance	
Orlando Ortega	110 metres hurdles	13.37	8 Q	13.23	4 q	13.37	7
Sergio Fernández	400 metres hurdles	50.38	30	Did not advance			
Fernando Carro	3000 metres steeplechase	8:38.42	33	—N/a		Did not advance	
Sebastián Martos	3000 metres steeplechase	8:51.57	42	—N/a		Did not advance	
Jonathan Romeo	3000 metres steeplechase	8:38.05	32	—N/a		Did not advance	
Iván Fernández	Marathon	—N/a				DNF	–
Javier Guerra	Marathon	—N/a				2:15.22	17
Ayad Lamdassem	Marathon	—N/a				DNF	–
Óscar Husillos; Lucas Búa; Darwin Echeverry; Samuel García	4 × 400 metres relay	3:01.72	7 Q	—N/a		3:00.65 NR	5
Luis Alberto Amezcua	20 kilometres walk	—N/a				1:19:46 PB	9
Diego García	20 kilometres walk	—N/a				1:20:34 PB	13
Miguel Ángel López	20 kilometres walk	—N/a				1:19:57 SB	10
Álvaro Martín	20 kilometres walk	—N/a				1:19:41 SB	8
Francisco Arcilla	50 kilometres walk	—N/a				3:57:27	26
José Ignacio Díaz	50 kilometres walk	—N/a				3:48:08 PB	17
Iván Pajuelo	50 kilometres walk	—N/a				DNF	–

Field events

Athlete	Event	Qualification		Final	
Athlete	Event	Width Height	Rank	Width Height	Rank
Igor Bychkov	Pole vault	NH	–	Did not advance	
Adrián Vallés	Pole vault	5.60	16	Did not advance	
Eusebio Cáceres	Long jump	NM	–	Did not advance	
Pablo Torrijos	Triple jump	16.80	8 q	16.60	10
Carlos Tobalina	Shot put	19.87	22	Did not advance	

Combined events – Decathlon

Athlete	Event	100 m	LJ	SP	HJ	400 m	110H	DT	PV	JT	1500 m	Final	Rank
Pau Tonnesen	Result	11.26 PB	7.21	13.76	2.08	50.85 SB	14.57	43.07 SB	5.40 SB	55.13	4:46.31 SB	8006	14
Pau Tonnesen	Points	804	864	714	878	776	902	727	1035	665	641	8006	14
Jorge Ureña	Result	11.00 SB	7.30	13.91	2.08	48.72 PB	14.15 SB	36.33	5.00 SB	56.06	4:26.46	8125 PB	9
Jorge Ureña	Points	861	886	723	878	875	955	590	910	679	768	8125 PB	9

=== Women ===
Track & road events

Athlete	Event	Heat		Semifinal		Final	
Athlete	Event	Result	Rank	Result	Rank	Result	Rank
Estela García	200 metres	23.78	38	Did not advance			
Esther Guerrero	800 metres	2:02.22	27	Did not advance			
Solange Pereira	1500 metres	4:06.63	21	Did not advance			
Marta Pérez	1500 metres	4:05.82 PB	20	Did not advance			
Ana Lozano	5000 metres	15:14.23	20	—N/a		Did not advance	
Marisa Casanueva	Marathon	—N/a				3:05:05	78
Marta Esteban	Marathon	—N/a				2:33:37	21
Paula González Berodia	Marathon	—N/a				2:42:47	46
María José Pérez	3000 metres steeplechase	10:01.84	35	—N/a		Did not advance	
Irene Sánchez-Escribano	3000 metres steeplechase	9:46.59	22	—N/a		Did not advance	
Teresa Urbina	3000 metres steeplechase	10:21.90	40	—N/a		Did not advance	
Laura García-Caro	20 kilometres walk	—N/a				1:29:29 PB	9
María Pérez	20 kilometres walk	—N/a				1:29:37 PB	10
Ainhoa Pinedo	20 kilometres walk	—N/a				1:31:28	21

Field events

Athlete	Event	Qualification		Final	
Athlete	Event	Width Height	Rank	Width Height	Rank
Ruth Beitia	High jump	1.92	11 q	1.88	12
Fátima Diame	Triple jump	13.36	25	Did not advance	
Ana Peleteiro	Triple jump	14.07	12 q	14.23 PB	7
Úrsula Ruiz	Shot put	16.20	28	Did not advance	
María Belén Toimil	Shot put	16.38	26	Did not advance	
Sabina Asenjo	Discus throw	57.00	20	Did not advance	
Berta Castells	hammer throw	66.11	22	Did not advance	

Key

- Note–Ranks given for track events are within the athlete's heat only
- Q = Qualified for the next round
- q = Qualified for the next round as a fastest loser or, in field events, by position without achieving the qualifying target
- NR = National record
- N/A = Round not applicable for the event
- Bye = Athlete not required to compete in round
