= Uganda at the 2017 World Championships in Athletics =

- WA code: UGA

in London
- Competitors: 22
- Medals Ranked =31th: Gold 0 Silver 1 Bronze 0 Total 1

World Championships in Athletics appearances
- 1983; 1987; 1991; 1993; 1995; 1997; 1999; 2001; 2003; 2005; 2007; 2009; 2011; 2013; 2015; 2017; 2019; 2022; 2023; 2025

Uganda competed at the 2017 World Championships in Athletics in London, Great Britain, from 4–13 August 2017.

== Medalists ==
Medal	Name	Event	Date
Silver	Joshua Kiprui Cheptegei	Men's 10,000 metres	August 4

== Results ==
(q – qualified, NM – no mark, SB – season best)

=== Men ===
Track and road events

Athlete	Event	Heat		Semifinal		Final	
Athlete	Event	Result	Rank	Result	Rank	Result	Rank
Abu Salim Mayanja	800 metres	1:48.11	35	Did not advance			
Ronald Musagala	1500 metres	3:42.75	15 Q	3:42.01	21	Did not advance	
Jacob Kiplimo	5000 metres	13:30.92	22	—N/a		Did not advance	
Stephen Kissa	5000 metres	13:32.86	29	—N/a		Did not advance	
Joshua Kiprui Cheptegei	10,000 metres	—N/a				26:49.93	2nd place, silver medalist(s)
Moses Kurong	10,000 metres	—N/a				27:50.71	18
Timothy Toroitich	10,000 metres	—N/a				27:21.09	14
Robert Chemonges	Marathon	—N/a				2:21.24	43
Munyo Solomon Mutai	Marathon	—N/a				2:13.29	11
Jacob Araptany	3000 metres steeplechase	8:25.86	15 q	—N/a		8:49.18	14
Albert Chemutai	3000 metres steeplechase	8:23.18 PB	8 q	—N/a		8:25.94	10
Boniface Sikowo	3000 metres steeplechase	8:43.86	35	—N/a		Did not advance	

=== Women ===
Track and road events

Athlete	Event	Heat		Semifinal		Final	
Athlete	Event	Result	Rank	Result	Rank	Result	Rank
Dorcus Ajok	800 metres	2:02.98	34 Q	2:02.00	21	Did not advance	
Halima Nakaayi	800 metres	2:01.80	23 Q	2:01.74	19	Did not advance	
Winnie Nanyondo	800 metres	2:02.65	29	Did not advance			
Esther Chebet	1500 metres	4:14.12	40	Did not advance			
Mercyline Chelangat	5000 metres	15:16.75	22	—N/a		Did not advance	
Stella Chesang	5000 metres	15:23.02	24	—N/a		Did not advance	
Mercyline Chelangat	10,000 metres	—N/a				31:40.48 PB	13
Peruth Chemutai	3000 metres steeplechase	9:43.04	20	—N/a		Did not advance	
