= Eritrea at the 2009 World Championships in Athletics =

- WA code: ERI

in Berlin
- Competitors: 8 (all male)
- Medals: Gold 0 Silver 1 Bronze 0 Total 1

World Championships in Athletics appearances
- 1997; 1999; 2001; 2003; 2005; 2007; 2009; 2011; 2013; 2015; 2017; 2019; 2022; 2023

Eritrea competes at the 2009 World Championships in Athletics from 15–23 August in Berlin.

== Team selection ==
Track and road events

Event	Athletes	
Event	Men	Women
1500 metres	Hais Welday	
5000 metres	Teklemariam Medhin; Kidane Tadasse; Samuel Tsegay	
10000 metres	Teklemariam Medhin; Kidane Tadasse; Zersenay Tadese	
Marathon	Yared Asmerom; Yonas Kifle; Tesfayohannes Mesfin	
