= Sweden at the 2017 World Championships in Athletics =

- WA code: SWE
- National federation: Svenska Friidrottsförbundet
- Website: www.friidrott.se

in London, United Kingdom
- Competitors: 32
- Medals Ranked =31th: Gold 0 Silver 1 Bronze 0 Total 1

World Championships in Athletics appearances (overview)
- 1976; 1980; 1983; 1987; 1991; 1993; 1995; 1997; 1999; 2001; 2003; 2005; 2007; 2009; 2011; 2013; 2015; 2017; 2019; 2022; 2023; 2025

Sweden competed at the 2017 World Championships in Athletics in London, United Kingdom, from 4–13 August 2017. 32 athletes were selected to compete for Sweden.

== Medalists ==
Medal	Name	Event	Date
Silver	Daniel Ståhl	Men's discus throw	6 August

== Results ==
=== Men ===
Track and road events

Athlete	Event	Heat		Semifinal		Final	
Athlete	Event	Result	Rank	Result	Rank	Result	Rank
Andreas Kramer	800 m	1:45.98	12 Q	1:46.25	11	Did not advance	
Kalle Berglund	1500 m	3:39.62	9 q	3:40.05	11	Did not advance	
Mikael Ekvall	Marathon	—N/a				2:18:12	32
David Nilsson	Marathon	—N/a				2:22:53	52
Emil Blomberg	3000 m steeplechase	DNF	–	—N/a		Did not advance	
Napoleon Solomon	3000 m steeplechase	8:35.95	9	—N/a		Did not advance	
Anatole Ibáñez	20 km walk	—N/a				1:24:23 SB	44
Perseus Karlström	20 km walk	—N/a				1:23:36	37
Anders Hansson	50 km walk	—N/a				3:58:00 PB	28

Field events

Athlete	Event	Qualification		Final	
Athlete	Event	Distance	Position	Distance	Position
Armand Duplantis	Pole vault	5.70	8 q	5.50	9
Michel Tornéus	Long jump	8.07	=5 Q	8.19	8
Niklas Arrhenius	Discus throw	58.91	24	Did not advance	
Simon Pettersson	Discus throw	63.69	7 q	60.39	11
Daniel Ståhl	Discus throw	67.64	1 Q	69.19	2nd place, silver medalist(s)

Combined events – Decathlon

Athlete	Event	100 m	LJ	SP	HJ	400 m	110H	DT	PV	JT	1500 m	Final	Rank
Fredrik Samuelsson	Result	11.24	7.11	13.82	DNS	DNS	–	–	–	–	–	DNF	–
Fredrik Samuelsson	Points	808	840	717	0	0						DNF	–

=== Women ===
Track and road events

Athlete	Event	Heat		Semifinal		Final	
Athlete	Event	Result	Rank	Result	Rank	Result	Rank
Hanna Hermansson	800 m	2:01.25	13 q	2:00.43 PB	12	Did not advance	
Lovisa Lindh	800 m	DNS	–	Did not advance			
Meraf Bahta	1500 m	4:03.23	5 Q	4:04.04	6 Q	4:04.76	9
Sarah Lahti	5000 m	DNS	–	—N/a		Did not advance	
Sarah Lahti	10,000 m	—N/a				DNF	–
Louise Wiker	Marathon	—N/a				DNF	–
Lisa Ring	Marathon	—N/a				2:48:39	60
Charlotta Fougberg	3000 m steeplechase	10:21.21	39	—N/a		Did not advance	
Maria Larsson	3000 m steeplechase	9:48.13	23	—N/a		Did not advance	

Field events

Athlete	Event	Qualification		Final	
Athlete	Event	Distance	Position	Distance	Position
Erika Kinsey	High jump	1.85	=21	Did not advance	
Sofie Skoog	High jump	1.89	18	Did not advance	
Angelica Bengtsson	Pole vault	4.55	=8 q	4.55	10
Lisa Gunnarsson	Pole vault	4.35	17	Did not advance	
Michaela Meijer	Pole vault	NH	–	Did not advance	
Khaddi Sagnia	Long jump	6.42	16	Did not advance	
Fanny Roos	Shot put	17.31	20	Did not advance	
Marinda Petersson	Hammer throw	66.46	20	Did not advance	
Ida Storm	Hammer throw	67.39	17	Did not advance	
