= Awet Habte =

Eritrean long-distance runner

Awet Habte Ghebrezghiabher (born 29 September 1997) is an Eritrean long-distance runner.

He finished seventh in the 5000 metres at the 2016 World U20 Championships and fourteenth in the 5000 metres at the 2017 World Championships.

His personal best time is 13:16.09 minutes, achieved in June 2017 in Carquefou; and 28:18 minutes in the 10 kilometres road race, achieved in October 2016 in Berlin.

In 2019, he competed in the senior men's race at the 2019 IAAF World Cross Country Championships held in Aarhus, Denmark. He finished in 28th place.
