= Cyrus Rutto =

Kenyan long-distance runner

Personal information
- Born: 21 April 1992 (age 34)

Sport
- Country: Kenya
- Sport: Long-distance running

Cyrus Rutto (born 21 April 1992) is a Kenyan long-distance runner.

He finished thirteenth in the 5000 metres at the 2017 World Championships.

His personal best times are 7:37.57 minutes in the 3000 metres, achieved in September 2013 in Rieti; 13:03.44 minutes in the 5000 metres, achieved in June 2017 in Somerville; 29:13.7 minutes in the 10,000 metres, achieved in June 2010 in Nairobi.

In 2019 he was given a four-year ban for breaking anti-doping regulations.
