= Kadar Omar =

Long distance runner (born 1996)

- Omar in 2026

Personal information
- Nationality: Great Britain
- Born: Kadar Omar Abdullahi; 1 January 1996 (age 30) Ethiopia

Sport
- Sport: Athletics
- Event: Long-distance running
- Club: Birchfield Harriers

Kadar Omar Abdullahi (born 1 January 1996) is an Ethiopian-born long-distance and cross country runner, based in the United Kingdom. He represented the Athlete Refugee Team over 5000 metres at the 2017 World Championships. Having gained British citizenship, he became British champion in the half marathon in 2026.

== Biography ==
Kadar fled Ethiopia at the age of 13 years-old, and having spent time in a displacement camp in Kenya, eventually settled in the United Kingdom from August 2017, where he claimed asylum and studied at South and City College Birmingham. He also joined the Birchfield Harriers in Perry Barr. He represented the Athlete Refugee Team over 5000 metres at the 2017 World Championships. The following year, he won at the Great Birmingham Run on his debut at the half marathon distance.

Omar won the Battersea 10k in February 2026. In September, Kadar won the 2026 Big Half in London, and having obtained British citizenship, became the UK Athletics Half Marathon champion as well as being the first across the line at the UK 10-mile championships in October at the Great South Run in Portsmouth. In November, he placed third at the Cardiff Cross Challenge, a silver label race on the World Athletics Cross Country Tour.
