= Sergey Shirobokov =

Russian racewalker

Personal information
- Full name: Sergey Vladimirovich Shirobokov
- Nationality: Russian
- Born: 11 February 1999 (age 27) Malaya Ita, Sharkansky District, Udmurtia, Russia

Sport
- Country: Russia; Independent Athlete (EAA (2017); Authorised Neutral Athletes (2017)
- Sport: Track and field
- Event: 20 km walk

Achievements and titles
- Personal best: 1:17:25 (2018)
Medal record
World Championships
Silver medal – second place	2017 London	20 km walk
European Junior Championships
Gold medal – first place	2017 Grosseto	10,000 m walk
World Youth Championships
Gold medal – first place	2015 Cali	10,000 m walk

Sergey Vladimirovich Shirobokov (Russian: Серге́й Влади́мирович Широбо́ков; born 11 February 1999) is a Russian male racewalker. His personal best for 20 km walk is 1:17:25, achieved in June 2018 in Sochi. He competed at the 2017 World Championships as a neutral athlete winning a silver medal.

== International competitions ==
Year	Competition	Venue	Position	Event	Notes
Representing Russia
2015	World Youth Championships	Cali, Colombia	1st	10,000 metres walk	42.24.41
Competed as an Independent Athlete (EAA)
2017	European Athletics U20 Championships	Grosseto, Italy	1st	10,000 metres walk	43:21.29
2017	Competed as an Authorised Neutral Athlete				
2017	World Championships	London, United Kingdom	2nd	20 km walk	1:18:55
