= Gemma Bridge =

English racewalker (born 1993)

Personal information
- Nationality: British (English)
- Born: 17 May 1993 (age 32) Oxford, England

Sport
- Sport: Athletics
- Event: 20km race walk
- Club: Oxford City Athletic Club
- Coached by: Mark Wall

Gemma Bridge (born 17 May 1993) previously competed internationally in racewalking events.

== Biography ==
Born in Oxford, she studied biology at the University of Birmingham and ran cross country for the varsity team. Gemma completed her master's degree in the United States at McNeese State University where she also ran for the university. Gemma has doctorate from Leeds Beckett University. Gemma now works in public health, and is Director of Bridge Research.

She became British champion when winning the 5000 metres race walk event at the 2020 British Athletics Championships, with a time of 22 min 51.15 sec. She also won the 20 km Race Walking Association Championships in Leeds, which doubled as the British Championships, with a time of 1 hour 32 mins. She finished fifth in the women's 20 kilometres walk at the 2018 Commonwealth Games and has represented her country at the World Championships in Athletics and IAAF World Race Walking Team Championships.

Since retiring from race walking, Gemma now enjoys running and hiking.
