= Hiskel Tewelde =

Eritrean long-distance runner

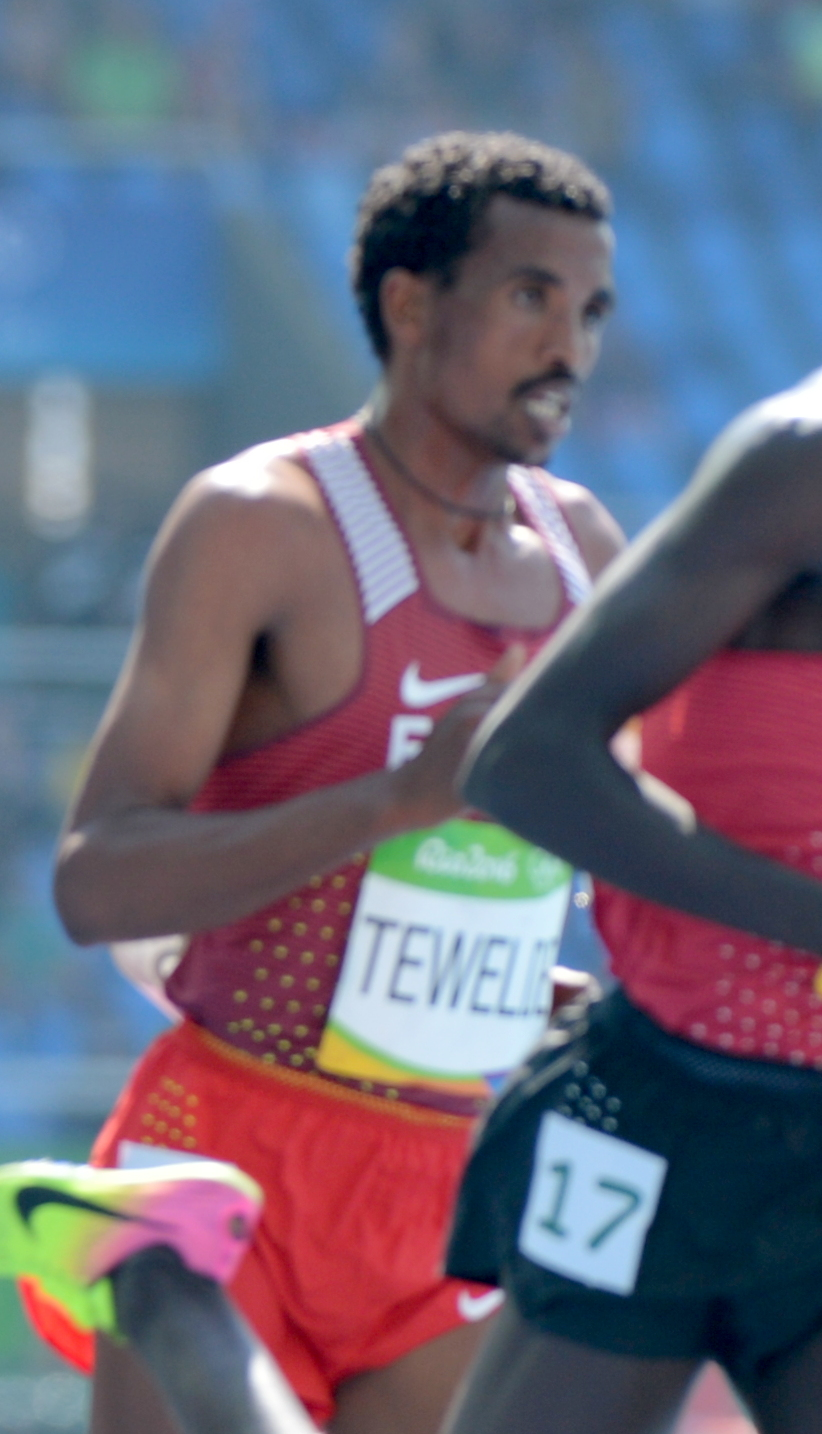
- Tewelde at the 2016 Olympics

Personal information
- Born: 15 September 1986 (age 39) Ethiopia

Sport
- Sport: Athletics
- Event: 5000 m – half marathon

Achievements and titles
- Personal bests: 5000 m – 13:17.24 (2016); 10,000 m – 27:30.50 (2016); HM – 1:00:29 (2015)

Hiskel Tewelde (born 15 September 1986) is a long-distance runner from Eritrea. He competed in the 5000 m event at the 2016 Summer Olympics, but failed to reach the final.
