= 2019 Meeting International Mohammed VI d'Athlétisme de Rabat =

- Dates: 16 June 2019
- Host city: Rabat, Morocco
- Venue: Prince Moulay Abdellah Stadium
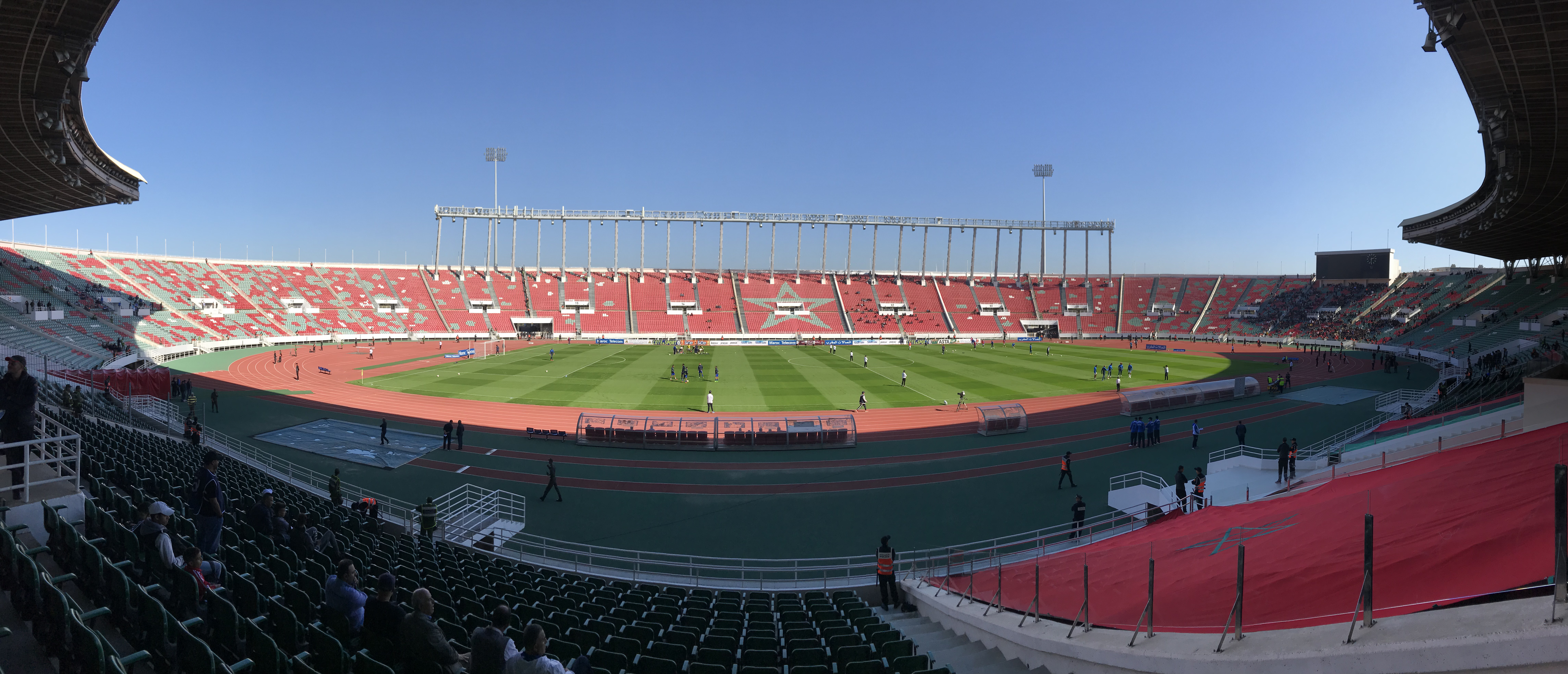
- Level: 2019 IAAF Diamond League
- Events: 21 (13 Diamond League)

The 2019 Meeting International Mohammed VI d'Athlétisme de Rabat was the 12th edition of the annual outdoor track and field meeting in Rabat, Morocco. Held on 16 June at the Prince Moulay Abdellah Stadium, it was the sixth leg of the 2019 IAAF Diamond League – the highest level international track and field circuit. 21 events were held with 13 of them being point-earning Diamond League disciplines. The other events were held primarily for Moroccan nationals except for the men's 1500 m and 5000 m.

One of the highest quality events of the night was the women's 1500 m, won by world record holder Genzebe Dibaba in a meeting record and world leading time of 3:55.47, ahead of Sifan Hassan who record the fastest losing time in history of 3:55.93 which was also a Dutch record. Diamond League leader Gudaf Tsegay finished third in a personal best time of 3:57.40, with the next eight runners also setting personal bests, with the exception of seventh-place Jenny Simpson who recorded the last sub-4:00.00 time (3:59.83). National records were set by fourth-place Moroccan Rababe Arafi and sixth-place Ugandan Winnie Nanyondo, with times of 3:58.84 and 3:59.56 respectively. In other women's events, Sandi Morris and Yaimé Pérez set meeting records in the pole vault (4.82 m) and the discus throw (68.28 m) respectively.

On the men's side of the competition, Fedrick Dacres, who already set the discus throw meeting record with a mark of 68.71 m in the second round, was initially disqualified in the third round for supposedly stepping outside the throwing ring; However, Dacres protested the ruling and requested that his throw be measured, which was determined to be 70.78 m. A review of the footage showed that Dacres had not stepped outside the ring, and he was given the win with his throw being a new world leading mark, Diamond League record, meeting record, Jamaican record, personal best, and the first over 70 m throw on the African continent. In the 110 m hurdles reigning Olympic and world champion Omar McLeod lead from the start with Sergey Shubenkov trailing until McLeod hit the last hurdle, which sent him crashing into Shubenkov who also lost his balance. Despite this, Shubenkov was able to finish first with a dive to the finish line, and was still able to match the meeting record of 13.12 seconds. Getnet Wale also won a close race in the 3000 m steeplechase with teammate Chala Beyo, finishing in a world leading time and Ethiopian record of 8:06.01.

== Diamond League results ==
Athletes competing in the Diamond League disciplines earned extra compensation and points which went towards qualifying for one of two Diamond League finals (either Zürich or Brussels depending on the discipline). First place earned 8 points, with each step down in place earning one less point than the previous, until no points are awarded in 9th place or lower.

=== Men ===
200 m (−0.5 m/s)
Place	Athlete	Time	Points
1	Andre De Grasse (CAN)	20.19	8 (+8)
2	Ramil Guliyev (TUR)	20.28	27 (+7)
3	Álex Quiñónez (ECU)	20.30	24 (+6)
4	Kenny Bednarek (USA)	20.51	5 (+5)
5	Clarence Munyai (RSA)	20.63	4 (+4)
6	Leon Reid (IRL)	20.88	5 (+3)
7	Bernardo Baloyes (COL)	20.91	8 (+2)
8	Mehdi Takordmioui (MAR)	21.13	1 (+1)

800 m
Place	Athlete	Time	Points
1	Nijel Amos (BOT)	1:45.57	23 (+8)
2	Emmanuel Kipkurui Korir (KEN)	1:45.60	14 (+7)
3	Clayton Murphy (USA)	1:45.99	10 (+6)
4	Ferguson Cheruiyot Rotich (KEN)	1:46.38	10 (+5)
5	Álvaro de Arriba (ESP)	1:46.64	4 (+4)
6	Andreas Kramer (SWE)	1:46.75	3 (+3)
7	Jonathan Kitilit (KEN)	1:46.78	6 (+2)
8	Mostafa Smaili (MAR)	1:47.47	1 (+1)
9	Guy Learmonth (GBR)	1:47.71	0
DNF (PM)	Saúl Martínez (ESP)	Did not finish (pace maker)	0

100 m hurdles (+0.3 m/s)
Place	Athlete	Time	Points
1	Sergey Shubenkov (ANA)	13.12	22 (+8)
2	Andy Pozzi (GBR)	13.30	17 (+7)
3	Gabriel Constantino (BRA)	13.41	11 (+6)
4	Wilhem Belocian (FRA)	13.43	5 (+5)
5	Omar McLeod (JAM)	13.48	12 (+4)
6	Antonio Alkana (RSA)	13.51	10 (+3)
7	Milan Trajkovic (CYP)	13.53	9 (+2)
8	Eduardo Santos Rodrigues (BRA)	13.58	1 (+1)
9	Aurel Manga (FRA)	13.88	0

3000 m steeplechase
Place	Athlete	Time	Points
1	Getnet Wale (ETH)	8:06.01 WL NR PB	8 (+8)
2	Chala Beyo (ETH)	8:06.48 PB	12 (+7)
3	Benjamin Kigen (KEN)	8:07.25	7 (+6)
4	Leonard Kipkemoi Bett (KEN)	8:09.27	11 (+5)
5	Hillary Bor (USA)	8:12.08	11 (+4)
6	Mohamed Tindouft (MAR)	8:12.89 PB	3 (+3)
7	Abraham Kibiwot (KEN)	8:17.25	6 (+2)
8	Djilali Bedrani (FRA)	8:18.44 PB	1 (+1)
9	Stanley Kipkoech Kebenei (USA)	8:21.25	0
10	Nicholas Kiptanui Bett (KEN)	8:24.69	2
11	Soufiane El Bakkali (MAR)	8:27.56	8
DNF	Andrew Bayer (USA)	Did not finish	0
DNF	Hicham Sigueni (MAR)	Did not finish	0
DNF (PM)	Daniel Arce (ESP)	Did not finish (pace maker)	0
DNF (PM)	Lawrence Kemboi Kipsang (KEN)	Did not finish (pace maker)	3

High jump
Place	Athlete	Mark	Points
1	Bohdan Bondarenko (UKR)	2.28 m	16 (+8)
2	Naoto Tobe (JPN)	2.28 m	7 (+7)
3	Ilya Ivanyuk (ANA)	2.28 m	16 (+6)
4	Mathew Sawe (KEN)	2.28 m	5 (+5)
5	Brandon Starc (AUS)	2.25 m	12 (+4)
6	Andriy Protsenko (UKR)	2.22 m	5 (+3)
7	Chris Baker (GBR)	2.19 m	2 (+2)
8	Gianmarco Tamberi (ITA)	2.19 m	6 (+1)
9	Sylwester Bednarek (POL)	2.15 m	0
10	Donald Thomas (BAH)	2.15 m	0

Long jump
Place	Athlete	Mark	Points
1	Juan Miguel Echevarría (CUB)	8.34 m (±0.0 m/s)	15 (+8)
2	Luvo Manyonga (RSA)	8.21 m (−0.4 m/s)	12 (+7)
3	Ruswahl Samaai (RSA)	8.16 m (−0.1 m/s)	12 (+6)
4	Eusebio Cáceres (ESP)	7.80 m (−0.5 m/s)	5 (+5)
5	Yahya Berrabah (MAR)	7.76 m (−0.6 m/s)	4 (+4)
6	Mouhcine Khoua (MAR)	7.64 m (−0.1 m/s)	3 (+3)
7	Fabian Heinle (GER)	7.56 m (+0.7 m/s)	2 (+2)
8	Zarck Visser (RSA)	7.52 m (±0.0 m/s)	5 (+1)
9	Tyrone Smith (BER)	7.49 m (−0.4 m/s)	0
10	Jeff Henderson (USA)	6.10 m (+0.2 m/s)	6
NM	Marouane Kacimi (MAR)	No mark	0

Discus throw
Place	Athlete	Mark	Points
1	Fedrick Dacres (JAM)	70.78 m WL DLR MR NR PB	15 (+8)
2	Daniel Ståhl (SWE)	69.94 m	23 (+7)
3	Lukas Weißhaidinger (AUT)	68.14 m	19 (+6)
4	Piotr Małachowski (POL)	66.58 m	8 (+5)
5	Martin Wierig (GER)	64.65 m	4 (+4)
6	Reggie Jagers III (USA)	64.59 m	8 (+3)
7	Andrius Gudžius (LTU)	64.37 m	2 (+2)
8	Victor Hogan (RSA)	62.98 m	1 (+1)
9	Ola Stunes Isene (NOR)	61.43 m	6
10	Christoph Harting (GER)	61.02 m	7

=== Women ===
100 m (−0.6 m/s)
Place	Athlete	Time	Points
1	Blessing Okagbare (NGR)	11.05	15 (+8)
2	Marie-Josée Ta Lou (CIV)	11.09	12 (+7)
3	Crystal Emmanuel (CAN)	11.30	6 (+6)
4	Orlann Ombissa-Dzangue (FRA)	11.32 (.312)	5 (+5)
5	Dafne Schippers (NED)	11.32 (.317)	4 (+4)
6	Gina Lückenkemper (GER)	11.36	3 (+3)
7	Vitória Cristina Rosa (BRA)	11.38	10 (+2)
8	Jamile Samuel (NED)	11.40	1 (+1)
9	Mikiah Brisco (USA)	11.47	0

400 m
Place	Athlete	Time	Points
1	Salwa Eid Naser (BHR)	50.13	24 (+8)
2	Aminatou Seyni (NIG)	50.24 NR PB	7 (+7)
3	Christine Botlogetswe (BOT)	50.48 PB	12 (+6)
4	Phyllis Francis (USA)	50.76	5 (+5)
5	Jaide Stepter (USA)	51.44	4 (+4)
6	Lisanne de Witte (NED)	51.53	8 (+3)
7	Kendall Ellis (USA)	51.82	5 (+2)
8	Madiea Ghafoor (NED)	52.92	1 (+1)

800 m
Place	Athlete	Time	Points
1	Nelly Jepkosgei (KEN)	1:59.50	19 (+8)
2	Habitam Alemu (ETH)	1:59.90	16 (+7)
3	Olha Lyakhova (UKR)	2:00.35	6 (+6)
4	Lynsey Sharp (GBR)	2:00.61	7 (+5)
5	Halimah Nakaayi (UGA)	2:00.91	4 (+4)
6	Ce'Aira Brown (USA)	2:01.19	3 (+3)
7	Emily Cherotich Tuei (KEN)	2:01.67	2 (+2)
8	Malika Akkaoui (MAR)	2:01.87	1 (+1)
9	Selina Büchel (SUI)	2:02.20	0
DNF (PM)	Noélie Yarigo (BEN)	Did not finish (pace maker)	0

1500 m
Place	Athlete	Time	Points
1	Genzebe Dibaba (ETH)	3:55.47 WL MR	16 (+8)
2	Sifan Hassan (NED)	3:55.93 NR PB	11 (+7)
3	Gudaf Tsegay (ETH)	3:57.40 PB	19 (+6)
4	Rababe Arafi (MAR)	3:58.84 NR PB	13 (+5)
5	Axumawit Embaye (ETH)	3:59.02 PB	8 (+4)
6	Winnie Nanyondo (UGA)	3:59.56 NR PB	9 (+3)
7	Jenny Simpson (USA)	3:59.83	7 (+2)
8	Gabriela DeBues-Stafford (CAN)	4:00.46 PB	5 (+1)
9	Eilish McColgan (GBR)	4:00.97 PB	3
10	Sarah McDonald (GBR)	4:01.50 PB	0
11	Lemlem Hailu (ETH)	4:02.97 PB	0
12	Siham Hilali (MAR)	4:05.80	0
13	Winny Chebet (KEN)	4:13.31	2
14	Josephine Chelangat Kiplangat (KEN)	4:16.17	0
DNF (PM)	Esther Guerrero (ESP)	Did not finish (pace maker)	0
DNF (PM)	Ilona Ivanova (BLR)	Did not finish (pace maker)	0

Pole vault
Place	Athlete	Mark	Points
1	Sandi Morris (USA)	4.82 m MR	20 (+8)
2	Anzhelika Sidorova (ANA)	4.77 m	9 (+7)
3	Katie Nageotte (USA)	4.67 m	14 (+6)
4	Katerina Stefanidi (GRE)	4.67 m	17 (+5)
5	Robeilys Peinado (VEN)	4.67 m	11 (+4)
6	Yarisley Silva (CUB)	4.67 m	8 (+3)
7	Alysha Newman (CAN)	4.67 m	4 (+2)
8	Xu Huiqin (CHN)	4.57 m PB	1 (+1)
9	Holly Bradshaw (GBR)	4.57 m	1
NM	Nikoleta Kiriakopoulou (GRE)	No mark	7

Discus throw
Place	Athlete	Mark	Points
1	Yaimé Pérez (CUB)	68.28 m MR	15 (+8)
2	Denia Caballero (CUB)	65.94 m	15 (+7)
3	Sandra Perković (CRO)	64.77 m	10 (+6)
4	Valarie Allman (USA)	64.58 m	8 (+5)
5	Nadine Müller (GER)	64.01 m	4 (+4)
6	Andressa de Morais (BRA)	63.12 m	5 (+3)
7	Kristin Pudenz (GER)	62.82 m	2 (+2)
8	Fernanda Martins (BRA)	62.51 m	1 (+1)
9	Claudine Vita (GER)	60.59 m	0
10	Mélina Robert-Michon (FRA)	59.24 m	1

== Non-Diamond League results ==
=== Men ===
Event	First		Second		Third	
1500 m	Vincent Kibet (KEN)	3:35.80	Hicham Akankam (MAR)	3:35.85 PB	Alexis Miellet (FRA)	3:35.98 PB
5000 m	Edward Zakayo Pingua (KEN)	13:11.49	Solomon Berihu (ETH)	13:16.08	Soufiyan Bouqantar (MAR)	13:17.26
100 m national (−1.5 m/s)	Youssef Haddar	11.03	Hamza Moudchi	11.04	Amine Ait Elhaj	11.09
800 m national	Bader Jalaoui	1:48.29	Abdelatif Elguesse	1:48.42	Elhassane Moujahid	1:48.76
1500 m national	Abdellatif Seddiki	3:41.13	Hafid Rizki	3:41.16 PB	Hicham Elkhayari	3:42.00 PB

=== Women ===
Event	First		Second		Third	
200 m national (−0.7 m/s)	Salma Lhilali	25.08	Chaimae Aabouch	25.84 PB	Hajar Tiss	26.34 PB
800 m national	Halima Hachlaf	2:02.00	Meryeme Azrour	2:09.16	Chaimae Arrouf	2:11.19
1500 m national	María Pía Fernández (URU)	4:19.40	Yousra Hannou	4:25.43	Lamiae Himi	4:25.54 PB

== See also ==
- 2019 Weltklasse Zürich (first half of the Diamond League final)
- 2019 Memorial Van Damme (second half of the Diamond League final)
