= 2016 IAAF World U20 Championships – Men's 3000 metres steeplechase =

The men's 3000 metres steeplechase event at the 2016 IAAF World U20 Championships was held at Zdzisław Krzyszkowiak Stadium on 21 and 24 July.

== Medalists ==
Gold	Amos Kirui; Kenya
Silver	Yemane Haileselassie; Eritrea
Bronze	Getnet Wale; Ethiopia

== Records ==
Standing records prior to the 2016 IAAF World U20 Championships in Athletics
World Junior Record	Saif Saaeed Shaheen (KEN)	7:58.66	Brussels, Belgium	24 August 2001
Championship Record	Conseslus Kipruto (KEN)	8:06.10	Barcelona, Spain	15 July 2012
World Junior Leading	Hailemariyam Amare (ETH)	8:21.10	Beijing, China	18 May 2016

== Results ==
=== Heats ===
Qualification: First 5 of each heat (Q) and the 5 fastest times (q) qualified for the final.

Rank	Heat	Name	Nationality	Time	Note
1	2	Vincent Kipyegon Ruto	Kenya	8:37.20	Q
2	2	Kidanemariam Dessie	Ethiopia	8:39.05	Q, PB
3	1	Getnet Wale	Ethiopia	8:43.92	Q, PB
4	1	Amos Kirui	Kenya	8:44.32	Q
5	2	Mohamed Ismail Ibrahim	Djibouti	8:44.49	Q
6	2	Yohanes Chiappinelli	Italy	8:44.51	Q
7	2	Abdelkarim Ben Zahra	Morocco	8:44.69	Q, PB
8	1	Yemane Haileselassie	Eritrea	8:46.31	Q
9	1	Albert Chemutai	Uganda	8:47.14	Q
10	2	Soufien Cherni	Tunisia	8:48.45	q, PB
11	2	Kai Benedict	United States	8:51.37	q
12	1	Taisei Ogino	Japan	8:51.50	Q
13	2	Zerom Berakai	Eritrea	8:52.23	q
14	1	Mohamed Amin Jhinaoui	Tunisia	8:53.51	q
15	2	Ahmed Saidia	Algeria	8:53.98	q, PB
16	1	Lennart Mesecke	Germany	8:57.61	
17	1	Alex Rogers	United States	8:59.00	
18	1	Thomas Byrkjeland	Norway	9:01.17	
19	1	Alexis Rodríguez	Spain	9:03.26	
20	2	Jannik Seelhöfer	Germany	9:03.37	
21	2	Louis Gilavert	France	9:09.58	
22	1	Víctor Ortiz	Puerto Rico	9:10.86	
23	2	Sean Bergman	Canada	9:13.76	
24	2	Miguel González	Spain	9:20.01	
25	1	Nickolas Colyn	Canada	9:25.67	
26	2	Muhand Khamis Saifeldin	Qatar	9:29.76	
	1	Ivo Balabanov	Bulgaria	DNF	

=== Final ===
Rank	Name	Nationality	Time	Note
1st place, gold medalist(s)	Amos Kirui	Kenya	8:20.43	WU20L
2nd place, silver medalist(s)	Yemane Haileselassie	Eritrea	8:22.67	
3rd place, bronze medalist(s)	Getnet Wale	Ethiopia	8:22.83	
4	Vincent Kipyegon Ruto	Kenya	8:22.84	
5	Yohanes Chiappinelli	Italy	8:32.66	
6	Abdelkarim Ben Zahra	Morocco	8:34.28	PB
7	Albert Chemutai	Uganda	8:37.76	PB
8	Kidanemariam Dessie	Ethiopia	8:39.92	
9	Mohamed Amin Jhinaoui	Tunisia	8:41.79	NU20R
10	Mohamed Ismail Ibrahim	Djibouti	8:42.38	
11	Soufien Cherni	Tunisia	8:42.56	PB
12	Ahmed Saidia	Algeria	8:44.53	PB
13	Zerom Berakai	Eritrea	8:44.89	
14	Kai Benedict	United States	8:49.13	PB
15	Taisei Ogino	Japan	8:53.71	
