= 2015 World Youth Championships in Athletics – Boys' 1500 metres =

Boy's 1500 metres at the World Youth Championships
- Venue: Estadio Olímpico Pascual Guerrero
- Dates: 15 and 17 July 2015
- Competitors: 27 from 19 nations
- Winning time: 3:36.38 CR

Medalists
| gold medal | Kumari Taki | Kenya |
| silver medal | Mulugeta Assefa | Ethiopia |
| bronze medal | Lawi Kosgei | Kenya |

The boys' 1500 metres at the 2015 World Youth Championships in Athletics was held on 15 and 17 July. Kumari Taki won the event in a championship record time of 3:36.38.

== Qualification ==
The first heat was won by Ethiopia's Mulugeta Asefa, in a 3:52.97 tactical affair. The first 800 m was run in just 2:11.40, leading to a slower final time and less qualifiers coming from the first heat.

Kumari Taki led the second heat qualifiers in a 3:48.35 time. He led from the starting gun to the finishing tape, with the first 800 metres being covered in a more honest 2:04.54.

== Finals ==
Taki again chose a frontrunning tactic to use in the finals, with only his countryman Lawi Kosgei willing to stick with the early pace. Taki began his kick with 600 metres remaining, allowing him to break Robert Biwott's old championship record by 0.39 seconds. Ethiopia's Mulugeta Assefa chose the opposite tactic, taking a slow, conservative early pace which paid off as he passed Kosgei for the silver medal.

== Results ==
=== Round 1 ===
First 4 in each heat (Q) and the next 4 fastest (q) advance to the final.

| Rank | Heat | Name | Nationality | Time | Note |
|---|---|---|---|---|---|
| 1 | 2 | Kumari Taki | Kenya | 3:48.45 | Q |
| 2 | 2 | Welde Tufa | Kenya | 3:49.71 | Q |
| 3 | 2 | Amine Bouazizi | Tunisia | 3:52.02 | Q |
| 4 | 2 | Mohammed Bouaziza | Algeria | 3:52.03 | Q, PB |
| 5 | 2 | Abdelkarim Ben Zahra | Morocco | 3:52.03 | q |
| 6 | 1 | Mulugeta Assefa | Ethiopia | 3:52.97 | Q |
| 7 | 2 | Jochem Vermeulen | Belgium | 3:53.86 | q |
| 8 | 1 | Lawi Kosgei | Kenya | 3:53.87 | Q |
| 9 | 1 | Ignacio Fontes | Spain | 3:54.48 | Q |
| 10 | 1 | Yani Khelaf | France | 3:54.70 | Q |
| 11 | 1 | Anton Hrabovskyy | Ukraine | 3:54.97 | q |
| 12 | 1 | James Gormley | Great Britain | 3:55.27 | q |
| 13 | 1 | Hicham Akankam | Morocco | 3:56.60 | |
| 14 | 1 | Brendan Hoff | Canada | 3:56.64 | |
| 15 | 2 | Antonio Criado | Spain | 3:58.05 | PB |
| 16 | 1 | Phillip Rocha | United States | 3:58.51 | |
| 17 | 1 | Anis Benstiti | Algeria | 3:59.07 | |
| 18 | 2 | Ramazan Barbaros | Turkey | 3:59.59 | |
| 19 | 1 | Carlos Hernández | Colombia | 4:01.60 | |
| 20 | 2 | Markhim Lonsdale | Great Britain | 4:02.45 | |
| 21 | 1 | Hou Zhongyuan | China | 4:05.54 | |
| 22 | 2 | Mateusz Dębski | Poland | 4:06.11 | |
| 23 | 2 | Takumi Yokokawa | Japan | 4:07.87 | |
| 24 | 2 | Abubakr Abdalla | Sudan | 4:08.02 | |
| 25 | 2 | Edward Hayfron | Canada | 4:11.39 | |
| 26 | 1 | Julius Bua | Uganda | 4:11.73 | |
| – | 1 | Justice Dreischor | Aruba | DQ | |

=== Final ===
| Rank | Name | Nationality | Time | Note |
|---|---|---|---|---|
| 1st place, gold medalist(s) | Kumari Taki | Kenya | 3:36.38 | CR |
| 2nd place, silver medalist(s) | Mulugeta Assefa | Ethiopia | 3:41.10 | PB |
| 3rd place, bronze medalist(s) | Lawi Kosgei | Kenya | 3:41.43 | |
| 4 | Welde Tufa | Ethiopia | 3:41.74 | PB |
| 5 | James Gormley | Great Britain | 3:48.31 | |
| 6 | Ignacio Fontes | Spain | 3:48.83 | PB |
| 7 | Yani Khelaf | France | 3:48.83 | |
| 8 | Anton Hrabovskyy | Ukraine | 3:51.48 | PB |
| 9 | Abdelkarim Ben Zahra | Morocco | 3:52.78 | |
| 10 | Jochem Vermeulen | Belgium | 3:54.50 | |
| 11 | Mohammed Bouaziza | Algeria | 3:56.91 | |
| 12 | Amine Bouazizi | Tunisia | 4:09.17 | |
