= 2018 IAAF World U20 Championships – Men's 3000 metres steeplechase =

Men's 3000 metres steeplechase at the 2018 World U20 Championships
- Venue: Ratina Stadium
- Dates: 12 and 15 July
- Competitors: 30 from 22 nations
- Winning time: 8:25.35

Medalists
gold medal	Takele Nigate	Ethiopia
silver medal	Leonard Kipkemoi Bett	Kenya
bronze medal	Getnet Wale	Ethiopia

The men's 3000 metres steeplechase at the 2018 IAAF World U20 Championships was held at Ratina Stadium on 12 and 15 July.

== Records ==
Standing records prior to the 2018 IAAF World U20 Championships in Athletics
World Junior Record	Saif Saaeed Shaheen (KEN)	7:58.66	Brussels, Belgium	24 August 2001
Championship Record	Conseslus Kipruto (KEN)	8:06.10	Barcelona, Spain	15 July 2012
World Junior Leading	Albert Chemutai (UGA)	8:17.17	Rome, Italy	21 May 2018

== Results ==
=== Heats ===
Qualification: First 5 of each heat (Q) and the 5 fastest times (q) qualified for the final.

Rank	Heat	Name	Nationality	Time	Note
1	2	Getnet Wale	Ethiopia	8:39.15	Q
2	2	Leonard Kipkemoi Bett	Kenya	8:39.30	Q
3	1	Albert Chemutai	Uganda	8:49.47	Q
4	2	Trung Cuong Nguyen	Vietnam	8:51.16	Q, NR
5	1	Takele Nigate	Ethiopia	8:51.17	Q
6	2	Denis Cherotich	Uganda	8:51.56	Q, PB
7	2	Tim Van de Velde	Belgium	8:52.78	Q
8	2	Takumi Yoshida	Japan	8:56.64	q
9	1	Mohamed Er Rachdi	Morocco	8:58.95	Q
10	1	Nikolaos Sakis	Greece	8:59.58	Q, PB
11	2	Stefan Schmid	Austria	9:01.91	q
12	2	David Foller	Czech Republic	9:02.45	q, PB
13	1	Murat Yalçinkaya	Turkey	9:02.80	Q
14	1	Alex Drover	Canada	9:02.97	q, PB
15	1	Giovanni Gatto	Italy	9:03.21	q
16	1	Aziz Jdai	Tunisia	9:03.61	PB
17	2	Saba Khvichava	Georgia	9:07.73	
18	2	Marcel Scheele	Canada	9:09.60	
19	1	Kosei Hitomi	Japan	9:11.99	PB
20	2	Wilho Hautala	Finland	9:12.42	PB
21	2	Hunter Boyer	United States	9:13.74	
22	1	Velten Schneider	Germany	9:14.74	
23	2	Ibrahim Oussaa	France	9:16.79	
24	1	Timothée Mischler	France	9:25.18	
25	1	Alejandro Ortuño	Spain	9:28.46	
26	1	Edwar Condori	Peru	9:36.08	
27	1	Nahuel Carabaña	Andorra	9:37.30	
28	2	Carlos Muñoz	Spain	9:41.66	
	1	Mohamed Amine Drabli	Algeria	DNF	
	2	Oussama Bassi	Algeria	DQ	

=== Final ===
Rank	Name	Nationality	Time	Note
1st place, gold medalist(s)	Takele Nigate	Ethiopia	8:25.35	SB
2nd place, silver medalist(s)	Leonard Kipkemoi Bett	Kenya	8:25.39	
3rd place, bronze medalist(s)	Getnet Wale	Ethiopia	8:26.16	SB
4	Albert Chemutai	Uganda	8:28.63	
5	Takumi Yoshida	Japan	8:50.99	PB
6	Giovanni Gatto	Italy	8:52.09	PB
7	Mohamed Er Rachdi	Morocco	8:57.21	
8	Tim Van de Velde	Belgium	9:02.03	
9	Stefan Schmid	Austria	9:02.20	
10	Nikolaos Sakis	Greece	9:02.45	
11	Trung Cuong Nguyen	Vietnam	9:04.38	
12	Alex Drover	Canada	9:10.16	
13	David Foller	Czech Republic	9:17.99	
14	Murat Yalçinkaya	Turkey	9:18.03	
	Denis Cherotich	Uganda	DNF	
