= 2015 World Youth Championships in Athletics – Boys' 2000 metres steeplechase =

Boys' 2000 metres steeplechase at the 2015 World Youth Championships in Athletics
- Venue: Estadio Olímpico Pascual Guerrero
- Dates: 17 and 19 July
- Competitors: 33 from 25 nations
- Winning time: 5:27.58

Medalists
gold medal	Vincent Kipyegon Ruto	Kenya
silver medal	Wogene Sebisibe	Ethiopia
bronze medal	Geoffrey Rotich	Kenya

The boys' 2000 metres steeplechase at the 2015 World Youth Championships in Athletics was held at the Estadio Olímpico Pascual Guerrero in Cali, Colombia on 17 and 19 July 2015.

== Records ==
Prior to the competition, the following records were as follows.

World Youth Best	Meresa Kahsay (ETH)	5:19.99	Donetsk, Ukraine	12 July 2013
Championship Record	Meresa Kahsay (ETH)	5:19.99	Donetsk, Ukraine	12 July 2013
World Youth Leading	Vincent Kipyegon Ruto (KEN)	5:27.17	Nairobi, Kenya	17 June 2015

== Results ==
=== Round 1 ===
First 5 in each heat (Q) and the next 5 fastest (q) advance to the final.

Rank	Heat	Name	Nationality	Time	Note
1	2	Wogene Sebisibe	Ethiopia	5:31.31	Q, PB
2	2	Geoffrey Rotich	Kenya	5:32.00	Q
3	1	Vincent Kipyegon Ruto	Kenya	5:34.52	Q
4	1	Tegenu Mengistu	Ethiopia	5:42.01	Q, PB
5	2	Daniel do Nascimento	Brazil	5:46.35	Q
6	1	Boniface Abel Sikowo	Uganda	5:46.56	Q, PB
7	1	Leo Magnusson	Sweden	5:50.04	Q, PB
8	1	Adrián Ben	Spain	5:51.01	Q
9	1	Kevin Robertson	Canada	5:53.21	q, PB
10	2	Sean Bergman	Canada	5:54.22	Q, PB
11	1	Louis Gilavert	France	5:55.06	q
12	2	Thomas Byrkjeland	Norway	5:55.35	Q
12	1	Luo Chun	China	5:55.35	q
14	2	Yassine Bih	Morocco	5:55.41	q
15	2	Will Battershill	Great Britain	5:56.35	q
16	1	Takeshi Nishida	Japan	5:59.06	
17	2	Alexis Phelut	France	6:02.83	
18	1	Diego Arévalo	Ecuador	6:04.75	
19	2	Wang Shaojie	China	6:06.49	
20	1	Mohamed Dhahri	Tunisia	6:07.89	
21	1	Arturo Reyna	Mexico	6:08.89	
22	1	Lê Trung Đức	Vietnam	6:09.63	
23	2	Hamdi Ayouni	Tunisia	6:10.90	
24	1	José Obando	Colombia	6:11.95	PB
25	1	Nikola Mićović	Serbia	6:14.79	
26	1	Víctor Ortiz	Puerto Rico	6:15.93	
27	2	Mohammed Ghalem	Algeria	6:16.03	
28	2	Simon Sundström	Sweden	6:17.18	
29	1	Muhand Khamis Saifeldin	Qatar	6:22.11	
30	2	Eduardo Menacho	Spain	6:22.38	
31	2	Pedro Ferreira	Portugal	6:24.38	
32	2	Bernhard Obrecht	Austria	6:33.19	
33	2	Hussein Haitham Lafta	Iraq	6:43.31	

=== Final ===
Rank	Name	Nationality	Time	Note
1st place, gold medalist(s)	Vincent Kipyegon Ruto	Kenya	5:27.58	
2nd place, silver medalist(s)	Wogene Sebisibe	Ethiopia	5:29.41	PB
3rd place, bronze medalist(s)	Geoffrey Rotich	Kenya	5:30.16	PB
4	Tegenu Mengistu	Ethiopia	5:38.99	PB
5	Boniface Abel Sikowo	Uganda	5:40.05	PB
6	Adrián Ben	Spain	5:45.59	PB
7	Louis Gilavert	France	5:46.00	
8	Daniel do Nascimento	Brazil	5:46.05	
9	Leo Magnusson	Sweden	5:49.26	PB
10	Sean Bergman	Canada	5:53.96	PB
11	Yassine Bih	Morocco	5:57.25	
12	Thomas Byrkjeland	Norway	5:58.63	
13	Luo Chun	China	5:58.92	
14	Will Battershill	Great Britain	6:03.39	
15	Kevin Robertson	Canada	6:14.11	
