= Athletics at the 2019 African Games – Men's 3000 metres steeplechase =

The men's 3000 metres steeplechase event at the 2019 African Games was held on 26 August in Rabat.

== Results ==
Rank	Name	Nationality	Time	Notes
1st place, gold medalist(s)	Benjamin Kigen	Kenya	8:12.39	
2nd place, silver medalist(s)	Getnet Wale	Ethiopia	8:14.06	
3rd place, bronze medalist(s)	Soufiane El Bakkali	Morocco	8:19.45	
4	Takele Nigate	Ethiopia	8:23.48	
5	Boniface Abel Sikowo	Uganda	8:28.53	
6	Mohamed Tindouft	Morocco	8:33.30	
7	Salem Mohamed Attiaallah	Egypt	8:34.87	
8	Mohamed Ismail Ibrahim	Djibouti	8:42.59	
9	Tesfaye Deriba	Ethiopia	8:44.59	
10	Bilal Tabti	Algeria	8:45.59	
	Yemane Haileselassie	Eritrea	DQ	
	Amor Ben Yahia	Tunisia	DNF	
	Abdelkarim Ben Zahra	Morocco	DNF	
	Joash Kiplimo	Kenya	DNF	
	Conseslus Kipruto	Kenya	DNF	
	Mohamed Amin Jhinaoui	Tunisia	DNF	
