= Athletics at the 2020 Summer Olympics – Men's 3000 metres steeplechase =

Men's 3000 metres steeplechase at the Games of the XXXII Olympiad
- Olympic Athletics
- Venue: Japan National Stadium
- Dates: 30 July 2021 (round 1); 2 August 2021 (final)
- Competitors: 44 from 22 nations
- Winning time: 8:08.90

Medalists
1st place, gold medalist(s)		Soufiane El Bakkali	Morocco
2nd place, silver medalist(s)		Lamecha Girma	Ethiopia
3rd place, bronze medalist(s)		Benjamin Kigen	Kenya

The men's 3000 metres steeplechase event at the 2020 Summer Olympics took place on 30 July and 2 August 2021 at the Japan National Stadium. 45 athletes competed.

== Summary ==
Kenya had won this event at every Olympic Games in which it participated from 1968 onward, securing a total of 11 titles, including nine consecutive victories following its absence from the 1976 and 1980 Games due to boycotts.

Ahead of the 2020 Summer Olympics (held in 2021), Ethiopia, a regional rival in distance running, was considered a leading contender. Lamecha Girma entered the competition with multiple top-ranked times globally, including two of the five fastest performances recorded at the time.

15 men qualified through a tough round of heats. On home soil, Ryuji Miura set the Japanese National Record. A slow third heat left, among others, one Kenyan and one Ethiopian runner to watch the final from the stands.

True to form in most championships, the final started slowly with Ethiopians Girma and Getnet Wale controlling the pace from the front. About 1K in, Miura injected a little more speed, but the Ethiopians went back to the point, marked by the Kenyan duo of Abraham Kibiwott and Benjamin Kigen along with Kenyan born American Benard Keter. As they approached 3 laps to go, Girma made an effort to speed up the race, the field stringing out behind them, with only the two Ethiopians, the two Kenyans breaking away with Soufiane El Bakkali going on the back of the leaders for the ride. Through the penultimate lap, both Kenyans showed signs of weakness, losing contact on the remaining three at the bell. Duplicating the strategy of Ezekiel Kemboi, El Bakkali accelerated over the first barrier of the backstretch. Wale struggled to keep up and Kigen sprinting to regain contact as his country's last hope. Entering the final turn, El Bakkali caught Girma. With both athletes taking the water jump cleanly, behind them as Kigen was catching Wale, his lead foot caught Wale's back kick and Wale was down. Kigen quickly regained his balance while Wale lost all momentum and his chance at a medal. After gaining the advantage, El Bakkali sprinted away from Girma to take the gold with Kigen getting the bronze. El Bakkali’s gold medal was the first Olympic or Worlds gold in 34 years—going back to the 1987 World Championships in Athletics—to be won by a non-Kenyan-born athlete.

== Background ==
This was the 24th appearance of the event, having appeared at every Olympics since 1920.

== Qualification ==
A National Olympic Committee (NOC) could enter up to 3 qualified athletes in the men's 3000 metres steeplechase event if all athletes meet the entry standard or qualify by ranking during the qualifying period. (The limit of 3 has been in place since the 1930 Olympic Congress.) The qualifying standard is 8:22.00. This standard was "set for the sole purpose of qualifying athletes with exceptional performances unable to qualify through the IAAF World Rankings pathway." The world rankings, based on the average of the best five results for the athlete over the qualifying period and weighted by the importance of the meet, will then be used to qualify athletes until the cap of 45 is reached.

The qualifying period was originally from 1 May 2019 to 29 June 2020. Due to the COVID-19 pandemic, the period was suspended from 6 April 2020 to 30 November 2020, with the end date extended to 29 June 2021. The world rankings period start date was also changed from 1 May 2019 to 30 June 2020; athletes who had met the qualifying standard during that time were still qualified, but those using world rankings would not be able to count performances during that time. The qualifying time standards could be obtained in various meets during the given period that have the approval of the IAAF. Both indoor and outdoor meets are eligible. The most recent Area Championships may be counted in the ranking, even if not during the qualifying period.

NOCs cannot use their universality place in the 3000 metres steeplechase.

== Competition format ==
The event continued to use the two-round format introduced in 2012.

== Records ==
Prior to this competition, the existing global and area records were as follows.

World record	Saif Saaeed Shaheen (QAT)	7:53.63	Brussels, Belgium	3 September 2004
Olympic record	Conseslus Kipruto (KEN)	8:03.28	Rio de Janeiro, Brazil	17 August 2016
World Leading	Lamecha Girma (ETH)	8:07.75	Fontvieille, Monaco	9 July 2021

Area	Time (s)	Athlete	Nation
Africa (records)	7:53.64	Brimin Kipruto	Kenya
Asia (records)	7:53.63 WR	Saif Saaeed Shaheen	Qatar
Europe (records)	8:00.09	Mahiedine Mekhissi-Benabbad	France
North, Central America and Caribbean (records)	8:00.45	Evan Jager	United States
Oceania (records)	8:14.05	Peter Renner	New Zealand
South America (records)	8:14.41	Wander Moura	Brazil

The following national records were established during the competition:

Country	Athlete	Round	Time	Notes
Japan	Ryuji Miura (JPN)	Heats	8:09.92	
India	Avinash Sable (IND)	Heats	8:18.12	

== Schedule ==
All times are Japan Standard Time (UTC+9)

The men's 3000 metres steeplechase took place over two separate days.

Date	Time	Round
Friday, 30 July 2021	9:00	Round 1
Monday, 2 August 2021	19:00	Final

== Results ==
=== Heats ===
Note: First 3 in each heat (Q) and the next 6 fastest (q) advance to the Final.

==== Heat 1 ====
Rank	Athlete	Nation	Time	Notes
1	Lamecha Girma	Ethiopia	8:09.83	Q
2	Ryuji Miura	Japan	8:09.92	Q, NR
3	Benjamin Kigen	Kenya	8:10.80	Q, SB
4	Ala Zoghlami	Italy	8:14.06	PB, q
5	Mohamed Tindouft	Morocco	8:15.91	q
6	John Gay	Canada	8:16.99	PB, q
7	Djilali Bedrani	France	8:20.23	(.223)
8	Mason Ferlic	United States	8:20.23	(.226)
9	Albert Chemutai	Uganda	8:29.81	
10	Vidar Johansson	Sweden	8:32.86	
11	Karl Bebendorf	Germany	8:33.27	
12	Carlos San Martín	Colombia	8:33.47	
13	Phil Norman	Great Britain	8:46.57	
–	Fernando Carro	Spain	–	DNF
-	John Koech	Bahrain	-	DNF

==== Heat 2 ====
Rank	Athlete	Nation	Time	Notes
1	Abraham Kibiwot	Kenya	8:12.25	Q
2	Getnet Wale	Ethiopia	8:12.55	Q
3	Ahmed Abdelwahed	Italy	8:12.71	Q
4	Matthew Hughes	Canada	8:13.56	SB, q
5	Yemane Haileselassie	Eritrea	8:14.63	SB, q
6	Benard Keter	United States	8:17.31	PB, q
7	Avinash Sable	India	8:18.12	NR
8	Sebastián Martos	Spain	8:23.07	
9	Ryoma Aoki	Japan	8:24.82	
10	Abdelkarim Ben Zahra	Morocco	8:28.63	SB
11	Edward Trippas	Australia	8:29.90	
12	Louis Gilavert	France	8:36.35	
13	Emil Blomberg	Sweden	8:39.57	
14	Zak Seddon	Great Britain	8:43.29	
15	Hicham Bouchicha	Algeria	8:44.75	

==== Heat 3 ====
Rank	Athlete	Nation	Time	Notes
1	Soufiane El Bakkali	Morocco	8:19.00	Q
2	Topi Raitanen	Finland	8:19.17	Q, SB
3	Alexis Phelut	France	8:19.36	Q
4	Osama Zoghlami	Italy	8:19.51	
5	Leonard Bett	Kenya	8:19.62	
6	Hillary Bor	United States	8:19.80	
7	Ben Buckingham	Australia	8:20.95	PB
8	Ole Hesselbjerg	Denmark	8:24.08	
9	Tadese Takele	Ethiopia	8:24.69	
10	Altobeli da Silva	Brazil	8:29.17	
11	Simon Sundström	Sweden	8:29.84	
12	Kosei Yamaguchi	Japan	8:31.27	
13	Daniel Arce	Spain	8:38.09	
14	Matthew Clarke	Australia	8:42.37	

=== Final ===
Rank	Athlete	Nation	Time	Notes
1st place, gold medalist(s)	Soufiane El Bakkali	Morocco	8:08.90	
2nd place, silver medalist(s)	Lamecha Girma	Ethiopia	8:10.38	
3rd place, bronze medalist(s)	Benjamin Kigen	Kenya	8:11.45	
4	Getnet Wale	Ethiopia	8:14.97	
5	Yemane Haileselassie	Eritrea	8:15.34	
6	Matthew Hughes	Canada	8:16.03	
7	Ryuji Miura	Japan	8:16.90	
8	Topi Raitanen	Finland	8:17.44	SB
9	Ala Zoghlami	Italy	8:18.50	
10	Abraham Kibiwott	Kenya	8:19.41	
11	Benard Keter	United States	8:22.12	
12	Alexis Phelut	France	8:23.14	
13	Mohamed Tindouft	Morocco	8:23.56	
14	Ahmed Abdelwahed	Italy	8:24.34	
15	John Gay	Canada	8:35.41	
