= Tafese Seboka =

Ethiopian steeplechase runner

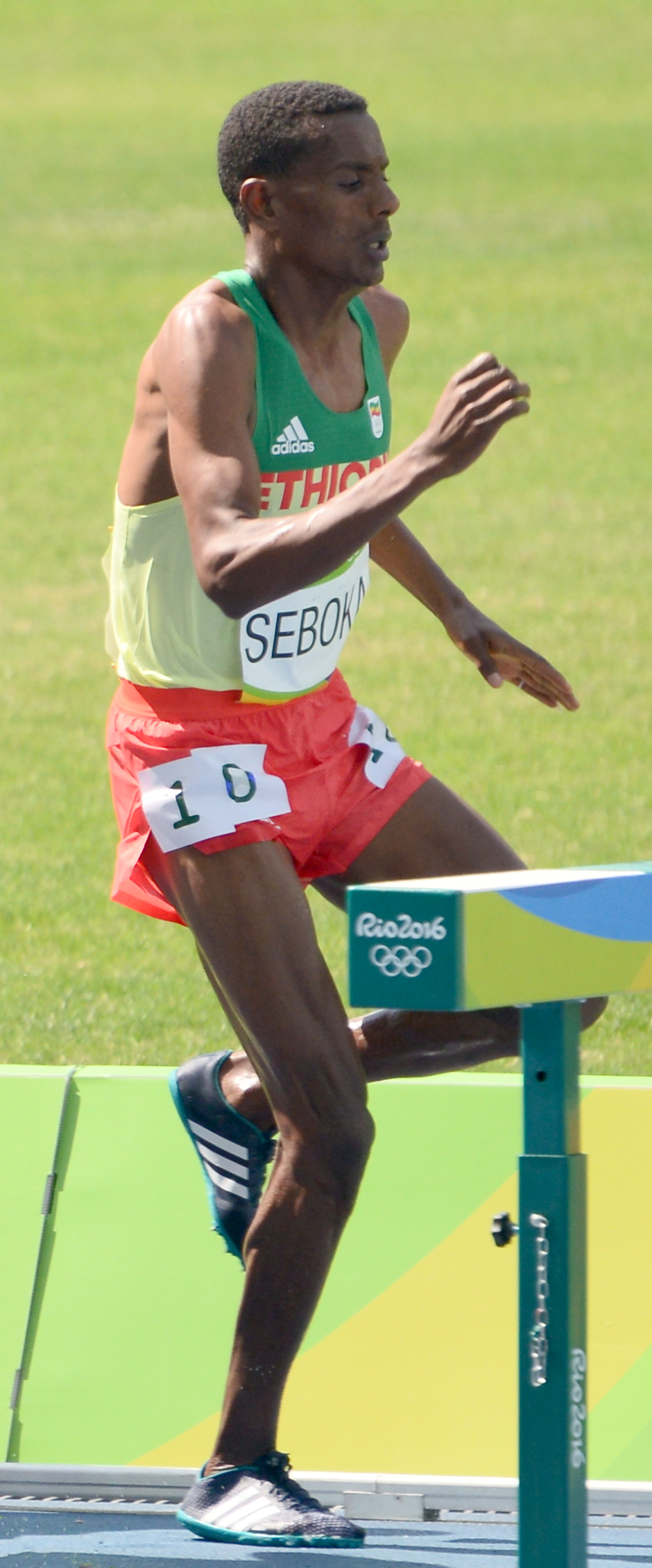
- Seboka at the 2016 Olympics

Personal information
- Born: 29 September 1993 (age 32)
- Height: 177 cm (5 ft 10 in)
- Weight: 66 kg (146 lb)

Sport
- Sport: Athletics
- Event: 3000 m steeplechase

Achievements and titles
- Personal best: 8:17.75 (2016)

Tafese Seboka Jimma (born 29 September 1993) is an Ethiopian athlete specialising in the 3000 metres steeplechase. He competed at the 2015 World Championships and 2016 Olympics without qualifying for the final.

== Competition record ==
Year	Competition	Venue	Position	Event	Notes
Representing Ethiopia
2012	African Championships	Porto-Novo, Benin	5th	3000 m s'chase	8:26.33
2014	African Championships	Marrakech, Morocco	7th	3000 m s'chase	8:46.90
2015	World Championships	Beijing, China	24th (h)	3000 m s'chase	8:47.73
2016	Olympic Games	Rio de Janeiro, Brazil	–	3000 m s'chase	DQ
2017	World Championships	London, United Kingdom	8th	3000 m s'chase	8:23.02
