= 2022 African Championships in Athletics – Men's 5000 metres =

The men's 5000 metres event at the 2022 African Championships in Athletics was held on 12 June in Port Louis, Mauritius.

== Results ==
Rank	Athlete	Nationality	Time	Notes
1st place, gold medalist(s)	Hailemariyam Amare	Ethiopia	13:36.79	
2nd place, silver medalist(s)	Daniel Ebenyo	Kenya	13:38.79	
3rd place, bronze medalist(s)	Hicham Akankam	Morocco	13:40.39	
4	Dinkalem Ayele	Ethiopia	13:42.57	
5	Ali Abdilmana	Ethiopia	13:45.29	
6	Ismael Kipkurui	Kenya	13:49.13	
7	Abdullahi Jama Mohamed	Somalia	13:56.54	
8	Ali Chebures	Uganda	13:58.89	
9	Houssein Sougueh Aden	Djibouti	14:04.42	
10	Julius Kipkwong	Kenya	14:05.79	
11	Moumin Bouh Guelleh	Djibouti	14:22.51	
12	Emmanuel Kiruhura	ART	14:27.80	
	Mohamed Ali Hassan	Somalia	DNF	
	Nelson Biyoko	Republic of the Congo	DNS	
	Youssouf Hiss Bachir	Djibouti	DNS	
	William Amponsah	Ghana	DNS	
	Toka Badboy	Lesotho	DNS	
	Hicham Ouladha	Morocco	DNS	
	Yach Wol	South Sudan	DNS	
	Yaseen Abdalla	Sudan	DNS	
	Yousif Musa	Sudan	DNS	
	Josephat Gisemo	Tanzania	DNS	
	Joseph Panga	Tanzania	DNS	
