= Athletics at the 2017 Summer Universiade – Men's 3000 metres steeplechase =

The men's 3000 metres steeplechase event at the 2017 Summer Universiade was held on 27 August at the Taipei Municipal Stadium.

== Results ==
Rank	Name	Nationality	Time	Notes
1st place, gold medalist(s)	Krystian Zalewski	Poland	8:35.88	
2nd place, silver medalist(s)	Rantso Mokopane	South Africa	8:36.25	
3rd place, bronze medalist(s)	Ali Messaoudi	Algeria	8:37.14	
4	Topi Raitanen	Finland	8:37.42	PB
5	Ole Hesselbjerg	Denmark	8:38.41	
6	Zak Seddon	Great Britain	8:39.30	
7	Martin Grau	Germany	8:45.63	
8	Ahmed Abdelwahed	Italy	8:47.72	
9	Kaur Kivistik	Estonia	8:48.04	
10	Justinas Beržanskis	Lithuania	8:49.46	
11	John Gay	Canada	8:50.45	
12	Álvaro Abreu	Dominican Republic	8:54.19	PB
13	Alberts Blajs	Latvia	8:58.27	
14	Nelson Blanco	Colombia	9:03.24	PB
15	Jean Rasmusen	Denmark	9:37.11	
16	Ayuob Al-Rashdi	Oman	9:47.47	
17	Hussain Al-Muhammadali	Saudi Arabia	10:07.99	
	Hassan Al-Kayyadi	Saudi Arabia	DNF	

Official Video
