= Topi Raitanen =

Finnish long-distance runner

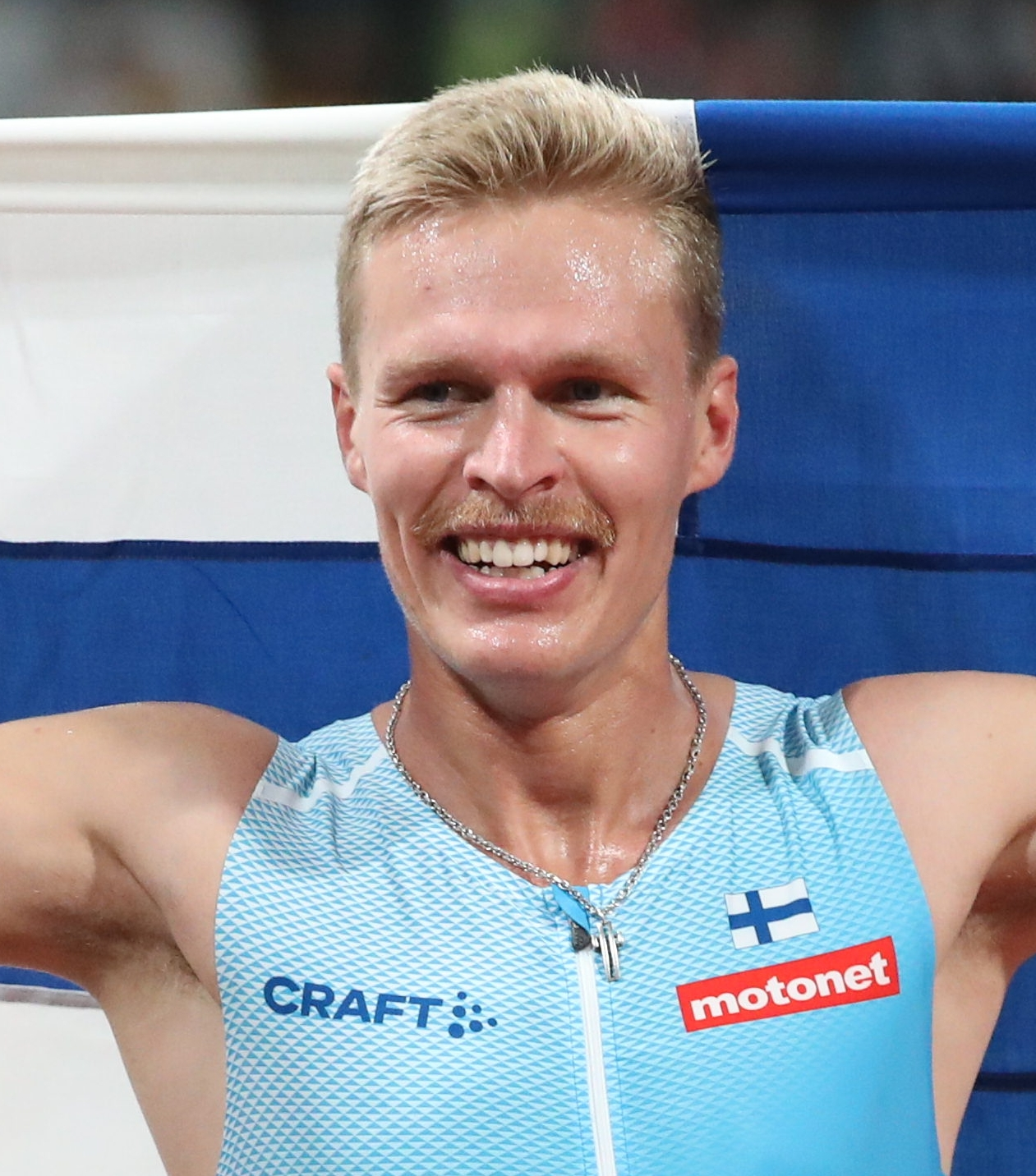
- Topi Raitanen in 2022

Personal information
- Full name: Topi Olli Vihtori Raitanen
- Born: 7 February 1996 (age 30) Tampere, Finland
- Education: Perho Culinary, Tourism and Business College
- Height: 1.85 m (6 ft 1 in)
- Weight: 74 kg (163 lb)

Sport
- Sport: Athletics and Orienteering
- Event: 3000 m steeplechase
- Club: Helsingin Kisa-Veikot
Medal record
Men's Athletics
Representing Finland
European Championships
Gold medal – first place	2022 Munich	3000 m st.
Men's orienteering
Representing Finland
Junior World Championships
Gold medal – first place	2015 Rauland	Relay

Topi Olli Vihtori Raitanen (born 7 February 1996 in Tampere) is a Finnish runner specialising in the 3000 metres steeplechase. He is the current European Champion in the event. He also reached the final at the 2018 European Championships finishing eighth. Raitanen also runs for Finland in Orienteering and has won a gold medal at the Junior World Orienteering Championships.

He qualified to represent Finland at the 2020 Summer Olympics, placing eighth in the final.

== International competitions ==
Year	Competition	Venue	Position	Event	Notes
Representing Finland
2017	European U23 Championships	Bydgoszcz, Poland	4th	3000 m s'chase	8:40.69
2017	Universiade	Taipei, Taiwan	4th	3000 m s'chase	8:37.42
2018	European Championships	Berlin, Germany	8th	3000 m s'chase	8:40.11
2019	European Indoor Championships	Glasgow, United Kingdom	13th (h)	3000 m	7:55.71
2019	World Championships	Doha, Qatar	29th (h)	3000 m s'chase	8:32.44
2021	Olympic Games	Tokyo, Japan	8th	3000 m s'chase	8:17.44
2022	World Championships	Eugene, United States	37th (h)	3000 m s'chase	8:43.01
2022	European Championships	Munich, Germany	1st	3000 m s'chase	8:21.80
2023	World Championships	Budapest, Hungary	28th (h)	3000 m s'chase	8:30.69
2024	European Championships	Rome, Italy	15th	3000 m s'chase	8:32.37
2024	Olympic Games	Paris, France	30th (h)	3000 m s'chase	8:33.12

== Personal bests ==
Outdoor

- 800 metres – 1:48.92 (Lappeenranta 2018)
- 1500 metres – 3:38.47 (Karlsruhe 2023)
- 3000 metres – 7:49.00 (Joensuu 2021)
- 3000 metres steeplechase – 8:16.57 (Monaco 2020)
- 5 kilometres – 13:43 (Armagh 2019)

Indoor

- 1500 metres – 3:49.63 (Helsinki 2018)
- 3000 metres – 7:55.71 (Glasgow 2019)
