= Ahmed Abdelwahed =

Italian steeplechase runner

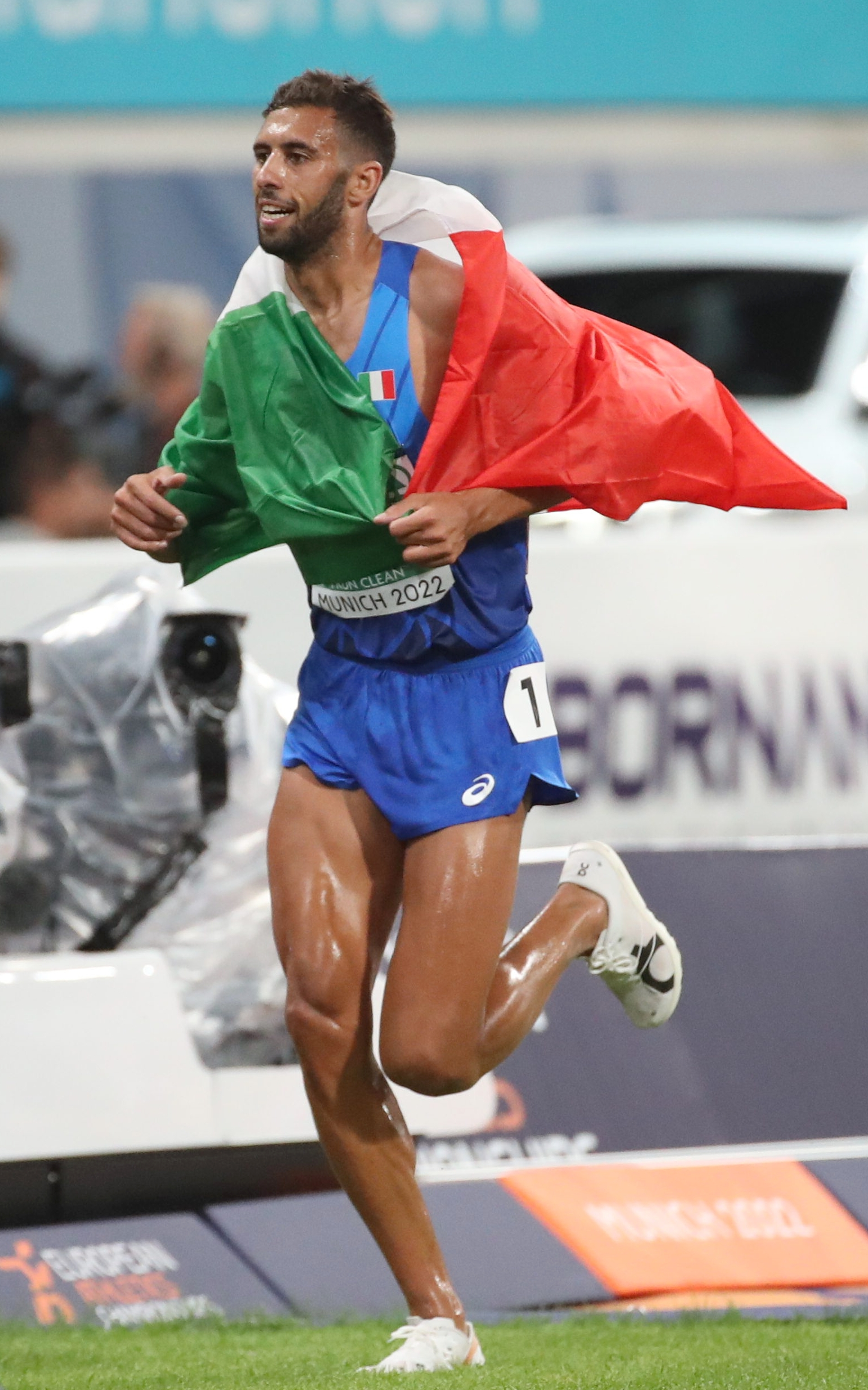

Personal information
- Nationality: Italian
- Born: 26 May 1996 (age 30) Rome, Italy

Sport
- Country: Italy
- Sport: Athletics
- Event: 3000 metres steeplechase
- Club: G.S. Fiamme Gialle

Achievements and titles
- Personal best: 3000 m s'chase: 8:12.04 (2021)
Medal record
European Championships
Silver medal – second place	2022 Munich	3000 m st.
Mediterranean Games
Bronze medal – third place	2018 Tarragona	3000 m st.
European U23 Championships
Silver medal – second place	2017 Bydgoszcz	3000 m st.

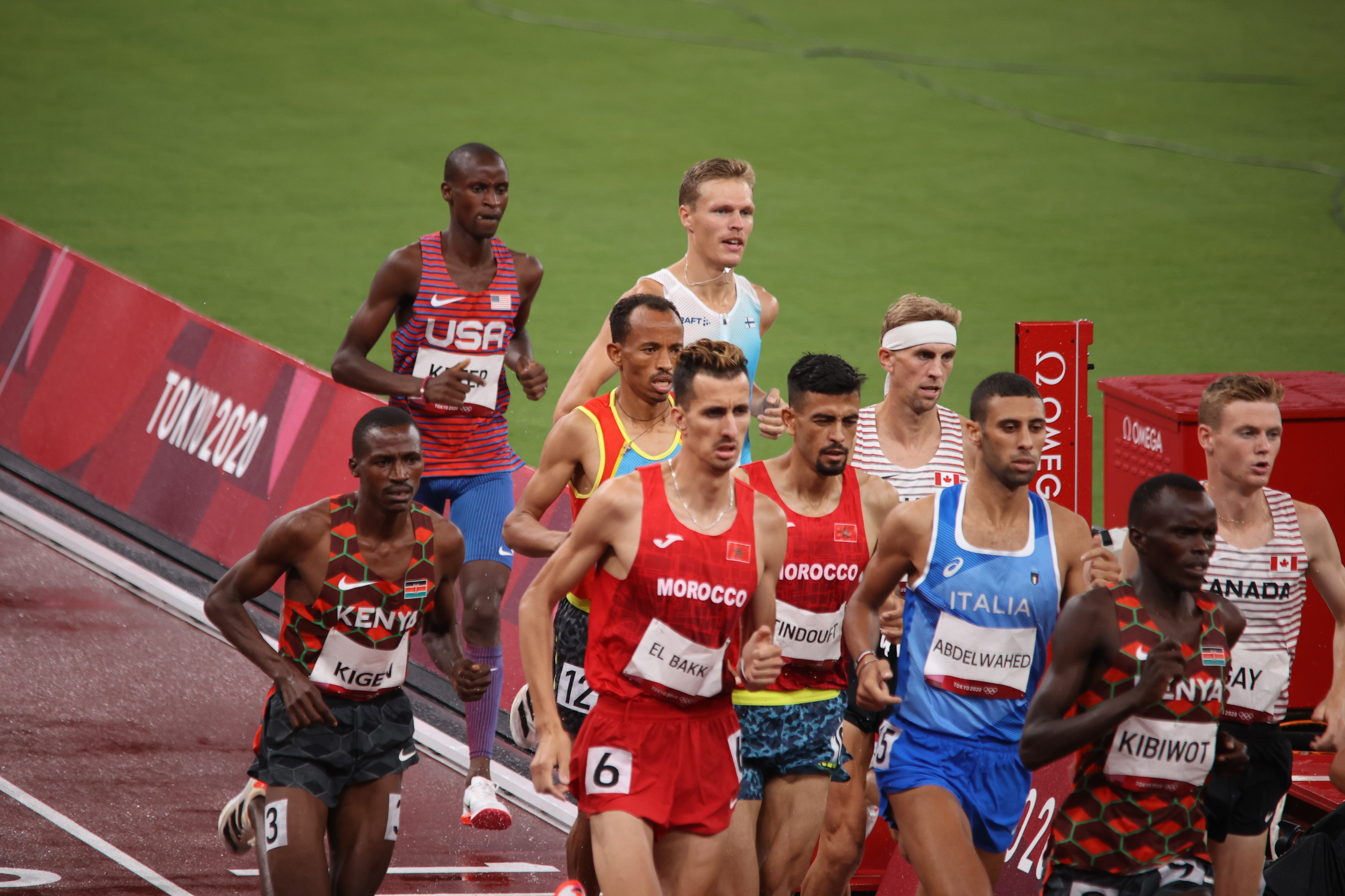
Abdelwahed at Tokyo 2020.

Ahmed Abdelwahed (born 26 May 1996 in Rome) is an Italian steeplechase runner of Egyptian origin who won a bronze medal at the 2018 Mediterranean Games. He competed at the 2020 Summer Olympics, in 3000 m steeplechase. His parents are from Egypt.

Abdelwahed is currently serving a four-year competition ban set to run from 2023 to 2027 in relation to an anti-doping rule violation after testing positive for meldonium at the 2022 European Athletics Championships. His appeal to the CAS was dismissed in August 2025.

== Personal bests ==
- 3000 metres steeplechase: 8:21.54 - (Czech Republic) Ostrava, 19 May 2021

== Achievements ==
Year	Competition	Venue	Position	Event	Time	Notes
2017	European U23 Championships	(Poland) Bydgoszcz	2nd	3000 m st	8:37.02	
2017	Summer Universiade	(Chinese Taipei) Taipei	8th	3000 m st	8:47.72	
2018	Mediterranean Games	(Spain) Tarragona	3rd	3000 m st	9:00.01	
2022	European Championships	(Germany) Munich	2nd	3000 m st	8:22.35	Provisionally disqualified pending appeal

== National titles ==
- Italian Athletics Championships
  - 3000 metres steeple-chase: 2019

== See also ==
- Italy at the 2018 Mediterranean Games
- Naturalized athletes of Italy
