= 2014 African Championships in Athletics – Men's 3000 metres steeplechase =

The men's 3000 metres steeplechase event at the 2014 African Championships in Athletics was held on August 12 on Stade de Marrakech.

== Results ==
Rank	Name	Nationality	Time	Notes
1st place, gold medalist(s)	Jairus Kipchoge Birech	Kenya	8:34.79	
2nd place, silver medalist(s)	Jonathan Ndiku	Kenya	8:37.67	
3rd place, bronze medalist(s)	Ezekiel Kemboi	Kenya	8:39.30	
4	Chala Beyo	Ethiopia	8:40.02	
5	Amor Ben Yahia	Tunisia	8:44.61	
6	Hamid Ezzine	Morocco	8:46.90	
7	Tafese Seboka	Ethiopia	8:46.90	
8	Abraham Habte	Eritrea	8:50.37	
9	Jaouad Chemlal	Morocco	8:52.50	
10	Soufiane Elbakkali	Morocco	8:59.66	
11	Nesredin Dette	Ethiopia	9:11.70	
12	Gaylord Silly	Seychelles	9:24.65	
13	Hermann Moussiessie	Republic of the Congo	10:17.35	
