= Tesfaye Deriba =

Ethiopian runner (born 1998)

Personal information
- Born: 11 September 1998 (age 27) Mekelle, Ethiopia

Sport
- Sport: Athletics
- Event: 3000 m steeplechase

Tesfaye Deriba Ketema (born 11 September 1998) is an Ethiopian runner specialising in the 3000 metres steeplechase. He represented his country at the 2017 World Championships finishing seventh in the final.

His personal best in the event is 8:13.33 set in Hengelo in 2017.

In 2019, he represented Ethiopia at the 2019 African Games held in Rabat, Morocco. He competed in the men's 3000 metres steeplechase and he finished in 9th place.

== International competitions ==
Year	Competition	Venue	Position	Event	Notes
Representing Ethiopia
2017	African U20 Championships	Tlemcen, Algeria	2nd	3000 m s'chase	8:33.67
2017	World Championships	London, United Kingdom	7th	3000 m s'chase	8:22.12
2019	African Games	Rabat, Morocco	9th	3000 m s'chase	8:44.59
2025	World Championships	Tokyo, Japan	–	Marathon	DNF
