= Amor Ben Yahia =

Tunisian runner (born 1985)

Hicham Sigueni
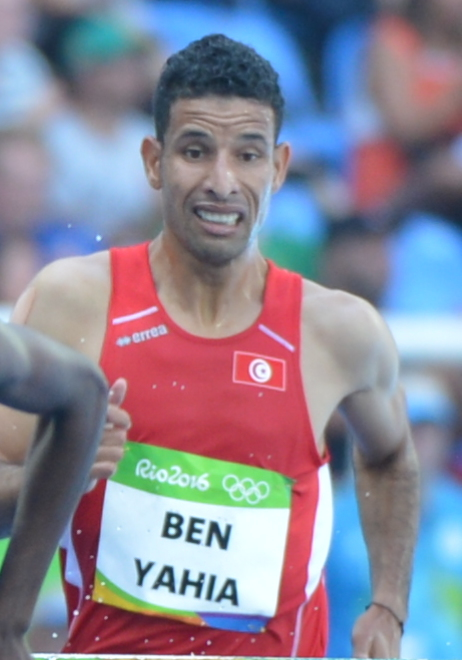
- Ben Yahia runs 3,000-meter steeplechase at Rio de Janeiro Olympic Games.

Personal information
- Born: 1 July 1985 (age 41) Kebili, Tunisia
- Height: 1.76 m (5 ft 9 in)
- Weight: 54 kg (119 lb)

Sport
- Sport: Track and field
- Event: 3000 m steeplechase
Medal record
Men's athletics
Representing Tunisia
Mediterranean Games
Gold medal – first place	Mersin 2013	3000 m steeplechase

Amor Ben Yahia (Arabic: عمر بن يحيى; born 1 July 1985) is a Tunisian athlete specialising in the 3000 metres steeplechase. He represented his country at the 2012 Summer Olympics as well as two World Championships.

His personal best in the event is 8:14.05 set in Mersin in 2013, and it became the Tunisian national record.

== Competition record ==
Year	Competition	Venue	Position	Event	Notes
Representing Tunisia
2009	Arab Championships	Damascus, Syria	4th	3000 m s'chase	8:50.21
2011	World Championships	Daegu, South Korea	19th (h)	3000 m s'chase	8:30.02
2011	Pan Arab Games	Doha, Qatar	4th	3000 m s'chase	8:47.18
2012	Olympic Games	London, United Kingdom	14th (h)	3000 m s'chase	8:22.70
2013	Arab Championships	Doha, Qatar	4th	3000 m s'chase	9:03.66
2013	Mediterranean Games	Mersin, Turkey	1st	3000 m s'chase	8:14.05
2014	African Championships	Marrakesh, Morocco	5th	3000 m s'chase	8:44.61
2015	Arab Championships	Isa Town, Bahrain	3rd	3000 m s'chase	8:31.28
2015	World Championships	Beijing, China	21st (h)	3000 m s'chase	8:43.11
2015	Military World Games	Mungyeong, South Korea	1st	3000 m s'chase	8:24.68
2016	Olympic Games	Rio de Janeiro, Brazil	4th (h)	3000 m s'chase	8:23.12^{1}
2018	Mediterranean Games	Tarragona, Spain	2nd	3000 m s'chase	8:26.14
2019	African Games	Rabat, Morocco	–	3000 m s'chase	DNF
2019	World Championships	Doha, Qatar	22nd (h)	3000 m s'chase	8:26.12

^{1}Disqualified in the final
