= Takele Nigate =

Ethiopian steeplechase runner

Personal information
- Born: 2 October 1999 (age 26)

Sport
- Country: Ethiopia
- Sport: Track and field
- Event: 3000 metres steeplechase

Takele Nigate (born 2 October 1999) is an Ethiopian track and field athlete who specializes in the 3000 metres steeplechase. In 2019, he competed in the men's 3000 metres steeplechase at the 2019 World Athletics Championships held in Doha, Qatar. He did not qualify to compete in the final.

In 2017, he won the men's 3000 metres steeplechase at the 2017 African U20 Championships in Athletics held in Tlemcen, Algeria.

In 2018, he won the men's 3000 metres steeplechase at the 2018 IAAF World U20 Championships held in Tampere, Finland.

In 2019, he represented Ethiopia at the 2019 African Games held in Rabat, Morocco. He competed in the men's 3000 metres steeplechase and he finished in 4th place.
