= 2017 World Championships in Athletics – Men's 3000 metres steeplechase =

Men's 3000 metres steeplechase at the 2017 World Championships
- Venue: Olympic Stadium
- Dates: 6 August (heats); 8 August (final)
- Competitors: 45 from 25 nations
- Winning time: 8:14.12

Medalists
gold medal	Conseslus Kipruto	Kenya
silver medal	Soufiane El Bakkali	Morocco
bronze medal	Evan Jager	United States

Video on YouTube Official Video

The men's 3000 metres steeplechase at the 2017 World Championships in Athletics was held at the London Olympic Stadium on 6 and 8 August.

After a temporary retirement announced immediately after the Olympic race, 4-time champion, seven time medalist Ezekiel Kemboi (Kenya), once known for his flamboyant frohawk hairstyles was back, now as a 35-year-old without a hair on his head. His historic record was well known, but his semi-final was his fastest race of the year making him an unknown quantity. In fact, the entire 2015 podium and the 2016 Olympic podium were in this event, though 2008 Olympic champion and 2015 bronze medalist Brimin Kipruto (Kenya) at age 33 didn't make the final.

== Summary ==
In the final Conseslus Kipruto (Kenya) went to the front, but he didn't set a blistering pace to burn off the competition, instead he kept control of the race. Jairus Birech (Kenya) and Evan Jager (USA) stayed close behind. After a leisurely 2:51.81 first kilometre, after which entire Ethiopian team of Tesfaye Deriba, Tafese Seboka and Getnet Wale moved ahead to push the pace. Kemboi was biding his time along the rail. Jacob Araptany (Uganda) lost his shoe and stopped in the middle of the track to fix it, taking him completely out of contention.

After four laps, Jager moved to the front and increased the pace, with only Kipruto, Birech, Ezekiel Kemboi and Soufiane El Bakkali (Morocco) staying in the front group with him. Birech, and later Kemboi, dropped away, and Jager led the remaining trio until they reached the beginning of the final backstretch, where Kipruto accelerated past Jager, followed by El Bakkali. By the water jump, El Bakkali had pulled even, but Kipruto had more speed down the final straightaway. Jager held third place despite a late run from Mahiedine Mekhissi.

== Records ==
Before the competition records were as follows:

Record	Perf.	Athlete	Nat.	Date	Location
World	7:53.63	Saif Saaeed Shaheen	BHR	3 Sep 2004	Brussels, Belgium
Championship	8:00.43	Ezekiel Kemboi	KEN	18 Aug 2009	Berlin, Germany
World leading	8:01.29	Evan Jager	USA	21 Jul 2017	Monaco
African	7:53.64	Brimin Kiprop Kipruto|	KEN	22 Jul 2011	Monaco
Asian	7:53.63	Saif Saaeed Shaheen	BHR	3 Sep 2004	Brussels, Belgium
NACAC	8:00.45	Evan Jager	USA	4 Jul 2015	Saint-Denis, France
South American	8:14.41	Wander do Prado Moura	BRA	22 Mar 1995	Mar del Plata, Argentina
European	8:00.09	Mahiedine Mekhissi-Benabbad	FRA	6 Jul 2013	Saint-Denis, France
Oceanian	8:14.05	Peter Renner	NZL	29 Aug 1984	Koblenz, West Germany

The following records were set at the competition:

Record	Perf.	Athlete	Nat.	Date
Iranian	8:33.76	Hossein Keyhani	IRI	6 Aug 2017

== Qualification standard ==
The standard to qualify automatically for entry was 8:32.00.

== Schedule ==
The event schedule, in local time (UTC+1), was as follows:

Date	Time	Round
6 August	10:05	Heats
8 August	21:10	Final

== Results ==
=== Heats ===
The first round took place on 6 August in three heats as follows:

Heat	1	2	3
Start time	10:04	10:22	10:38
Photo finish	link	link	link

The first three in each heat ( Q ) and the next six fastest ( q ) qualified for the final. The overall results were as follows:

Rank	Heat	Order	Name	Nationality	Time	Notes
1	2	9	Evan Jager	United States	8:20.36	Q
2	2	4	Tafese Seboka	Ethiopia	8:20.48	Q
3	2	5	Yoann Kowal	France	8:20.60	Q
4	2	11	Ezekiel Kemboi	Kenya	8:20.61	q, SB
5	1	15	Soufiane El Bakkali	Morocco	8:22.60	Q
6	1	12	Mahiedine Mekhissi-Benabbad	France	8:22.83	Q
7	1	13	Getnet Wale	Ethiopia	8:23.00	Q
8	2	15	Albert Chemutai	Uganda	8:23.18	q, PB
9	1	6	Bilal Tabti	Algeria	8:23.28	q
10	3	4	Conseslus Kipruto	Kenya	8:23.80	Q
11	1	4	Jairus Birech	Kenya	8:23.84	q
12	3	3	Stanley Kebenei	United States	8:24.19	Q
13	3	12	Matthew Hughes	Canada	8:24.79	Q, SB
14	3	10	Tesfaye Deriba	Ethiopia	8:25.33	q
15	1	9	Jacob Araptany	Uganda	8:25.86	q
16	1	2	Ala Zoghlami	Italy	8:26.18	PB
17	3	13	Hillary Bor	United States	8:27.53	
18	1	10	Ole Hesselbjerg	Denmark	8:27.86	PB
19	1	1	Krystian Zalewski	Poland	8:28.41	
20	2	1	Hicham Bouchicha	Algeria	8:30.01	
21	3	2	Altobeli da Silva	Brazil	8:31.82	
22	1	3	Zak Seddon	Great Britain & N.I.	8:32.84	
23	3	1	Brimin Kipruto	Kenya	8:33.33	
24	1	7	Hossein Keyhani	Iran	8:33.76	NR
25	2	10	Mohamed Ismail Ibrahim	Djibouti	8:33.77	
26	2	2	Abdoullah Bamoussa	Italy	8:34.86	
27	3	11	Jakob Ingebrigtsen	Norway	8:34.88	
28	2	8	Yemane Haileselassie	Eritrea	8:35.73	
29	3	14	Napoleon Solomon	Sweden	8:35.95	
30	3	8	Yohanes Chiappinelli	Italy	8:36.48	
31	1	5	José Peña	Venezuela	8:37.15	
32	3	6	Jonathan Romeo	Spain	8:38.05	
33	2	12	Fernando Carro	Spain	8:38.42	
34	3	9	Mohamed Tindouft	Morocco	8:40.99	
35	3	5	Boniface Sikowo	Uganda	8:43.86	
36	2	7	Hicham Sigueni	Morocco	8:44.74	
37	2	6	Mitko Tsenov	Bulgaria	8:45.21	
38	2	3	Hironori Tsuetaki	Japan	8:45.81	
39	2	13	Raouf Boubaker	Tunisia	8:46.25	
40	3	7	Stewart McSweyn	Australia	8:47.53	
41	3	15	Rob Mullett	Great Britain & N.I.	8:47.99	
42	1	8	Sebastián Martos	Spain	8:51.57	
43	2	14	Ieuan Thomas	Great Britain & N.I.	8:52.96	
44	1	14	Tarık Langat Akdağ	Turkey	8:53.42	
	1	11	Emil Blomberg	Sweden	DNF	

=== Final ===
The final took place on 8 August at 21:11. The results were as follows (photo finish):

Rank	Name	Nationality	Time	Notes
1st place, gold medalist(s)	Conseslus Kipruto	Kenya	8:14.12	
2nd place, silver medalist(s)	Soufiane El Bakkali	Morocco	8:14.49	
3rd place, bronze medalist(s)	Evan Jager	United States	8:15.53	
4	Mahiedine Mekhissi-Benabbad	France	8:15.80	
5	Stanley Kebenei	United States	8:21.09	
6	Matthew Hughes	Canada	8:21.84	SB
7	Tesfaye Deriba	Ethiopia	8:22.12	
8	Tafese Seboka	Ethiopia	8:23.02	
9	Getnet Wale	Ethiopia	8:25.28	
10	Albert Chemutai	Uganda	8:25.94	
11	Ezekiel Kemboi	Kenya	8:29.38	
12	Jairus Birech	Kenya	8:32.90	
13	Yoann Kowal	France	8:34.53	
14	Jacob Araptany	Uganda	8:49.18	
	Bilal Tabti	Algeria	DQ	
