= Hicham Akankam =

Moroccan runner (born 1998)

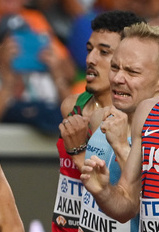
- Akankam (left) in the 1500 m at the 2023 World Championships

Personal information
- Nationality: Morocco
- Born: 4 April 1998 (28 years, 120 days old)

Sport
- Sport: Athletics
- Events: 3000 metres 2000 metres

Achievements and titles
- National finals: 2015 Moroccan U20s; • 1500m, 5th; 2016 Moroccan U20s; • 1500m, 3rd (bronze); 2016 Moroccan Champs; • 1500m, 10th; 2023 Moroccan Champs; • 1500m, 1st (gold)
- Personal bests: 1500m: 3:35.60 (2023); Mile: 3:57.66 (2017); 2000m: 5:00.51 sh (2022); 3000m: 7:44.61 sh (2022); 5000m: 13:14.17 (2022)
Medal record
Men's athletics
Representing Morocco
African U20 Championships
Bronze medal – third place	2017 Tlemcen	4 × 400 m relay
Mediterranean U23 Indoor Championships
Silver medal – second place	2019 Miramas	1500 m
African Championships
Bronze medal – third place	2022 Saint Pierre	5000 m
Arab Championships
Silver medal – second place	2023 Marrakesh	1500 m
Francophone Games
Gold medal – first place	2023 Kinshasa	1500 m
Silver medal – second place	2023 Kinshasa	5000 m
- Updated on 15 January 2024

Hicham Akankam (born 4 April 1998), also known as Hicham Akenkam or Akankam Hicham, is a Moroccan middle- and long-distance runner specializing in the 1500 metres. He was the 2023 Moroccan Athletics Championships winner, and he has represented Morocco in a variety of disciplines including while winning a gold medal at the 2023 Francophone Games.

== Biography ==
Akankam first gained international experience at the 2015 World U18 Championships, where he finished 7th in his 1500 m heat. Akankam did not make the finals, and the performance of Arabs at the championships was said to be a disappointment with only two medals and seven finalists.

Akankam again represented Morocco at the 2017 IAAF World Cross Country Championships in the U20 men's race, finishing 21st as the first Moroccan across the line as well as the first non-East African. During the outdoor season Akankam qualified for the African U20 Championships with an unusual double – the 1500 m and the 4 × 400 m relay, traditionally a sprint event. He finished 4th in the 1500 m to just miss the medals, but he got redemption in the 4 × 400 m, winning the bronze medal as second leg for the Moroccan team.

Akankam achieved one of his best results at the 2019 Meeting International Mohammed VI d'Athlétisme de Rabat, finishing 2nd in the non-Diamond League international 1500 m behind Vincent Kibet in a 3:35.85 personal best. Akankam lost the race in a sprint finish. Akankam entered in the 1500 m at the African Games, but he finished 6th in his heat and did not advance to the finals.

In 2020 and 2021, Akankam only raced domestically. But 2022 saw a resurgence during the indoor season, with Akankam running 7:44.61 3000 m personal best to qualify him for the World Indoor Championships. Finishing 5th in his heat, Akankam was the fastest non-qualifier for the finals. At the 2022 African Championships in Athletics, Akankam won his first senior international medal with a bronze in the 5000 m, the first non-East African finisher behind Daniel Ebenyo and winner Hailemariyam Amare. By virtue of his season, he qualified for the 5000 m at the World Championships, where he finished 17th in his heat and did not advance to the finals.

Akankam won a silver medal in the 1500 m at the 2023 Arab Athletics Championships, followed by winning his first national title at the 2023 Moroccan Athletics Championships. At the 2023 Francophone Games, Akankam competed in both the 1500 m and 5000 m, winning gold in the 1500 m ahead of his countryman Hafid Rizky. Akankam followed up this performance with a silver medal in the 5000 m the next day. Akankam ended his season with another World Athletics Championships appearance, this time in the 1500 m where he finished 9th in his heat and did not advance.

== Statistics ==
=== Best performances ===
Event	Mark	Place	Competition	Venue	Date	Ref
3000 metres	7:44.61 sh	5th	Meeting Metz Moselle Athlelor	Metz, France	12 February 2022	
2000 metres	5:00.51 sh	6th	Meeting Hauts-de-France Pas-de-Calais	Liévin, France	17 February 2022	
