= 2017 European Athletics U23 Championships – Men's 3000 metres steeplechase =

The men's 3000 metres steeplechase event at the 2017 European Athletics U23 Championships was held in Bydgoszcz, Poland, at Zdzisław Krzyszkowiak Stadium on 14 and 16 July.

== Medalists ==
Gold	Yohanes Chiappinelli; Italy
Silver	Ahmed Abdelwahed; Italy
Bronze	Jamaine Coleman; Great Britain

== Results ==
=== Heats ===
14 July

Qualification rule: First 5 (Q) and the next 5 fastest (q) qualified for the final.

Rank	Heat	Name	Nationality	Time	Notes
1	1	Yohanes Chiappinelli	Italy	8:43.68	Q
2	1	Topi Raitanen	Finland	8:43.80	Q
3	1	Noah Schutte	Netherlands	8:45.07	Q
4	1	Balázs Juhász	Hungary	8:45.75	Q, PB
5	1	Vidar Johansson	Sweden	8:46.13	Q, SB
6	1	Turgay Bayram	Turkey	8:46.92	q, PB
7	2	Jamaine Coleman	Great Britain	8:50.15	Q
8	2	Ahmed Abdelwahed	Italy	8:50.31	Q
9	2	Lennart Mesecke	Germany	8:50.89	Q
10	2	Alexis Rodríguez	Spain	8:50.99	Q
11	2	Alberts Blajs	Latvia	8:51.38	Q, SB
12	2	Simone Colombini	Italy	8:52.01	q
13	1	Daniel Jarvis	Great Britain	8:52.65	q
14	2	André Pereira	Portugal	8:55.77	q, SB
15	2	Anthony Pontier	France	8:57.26	q
16	1	Ersin Tekal	Turkey	8:59.43	SB
17	1	Luca Sinn	Austria	9:01.89	
18	2	Serhiy Shevchenko	Ukraine	9:05.62	
19	1	Ricardo Barbosa	Portugal	9:07.10	
20	2	Paul Stüger	Austria	9:14.90	
21	1	Khalil Rmidi	Spain	9:15.24	
22	2	Ivo Balabanov	Bulgaria	9:18.10	SB
23	2	Oğuzhan Ülger	Turkey	9:33.07	

=== Final ===
16 July

Rank	Name	Nationality	Time	Notes
1st place, gold medalist(s)	Yohanes Chiappinelli	Italy	8:34.33	
2nd place, silver medalist(s)	Ahmed Abdelwahed	Italy	8:37.02	
3rd place, bronze medalist(s)	Jamaine Coleman	Great Britain	8:40.44	
4	Topi Raitanen	Finland	8:40.69	
5	Balázs Juhász	Hungary	8:45.90	
6	Turgay Bayram	Turkey	8:46.48	PB
7	Lennart Mesecke	Germany	8:50.21	
8	Simone Colombini	Italy	8:54.80	
9	Alberts Blajs	Latvia	8:58.62	
10	Vidar Johansson	Sweden	9:00.81	
11	Alexis Rodríguez	Spain	9:02.42	
12	Daniel Jarvis	Great Britain	9:03.07	
13	Anthony Pontier	France	9:16.94	
	André Pereira	Portugal	DQ	R163.3
	Noah Schutte	Netherlands	DNF	
