= Jamaine Coleman =

British athlete

Personal information
- Nationality: British
- Born: 22 September 1995 (age 30)

Sport
- Sport: Track and Field
- Event: 3000m steeplechase
- Club: Preston Harriers
Medal record
Representing Great Britain
European U23 Championships
Bronze medal – third place	2017 Bydgoszcz	3000 steeplechase
Representing England
British Championships
Gold medal – first place	2022 Manchester	3000 steeplechase

Jamaine Coleman (born 22 September 1995) is a British steeplechaser and middle-distance runner. In 2022, he became the British champion in the 3000 metres steeplechase.

== Biography ==
Coleman competed for the Eastern Kentucky Colonels track and field team in the NCAA.

In 2016, Coleman won the bronze medal in the 3000 steeplechase at the 2017 European Athletics U23 Championships in Bydgoszcz, Poland.

He became the British champion after winning the 3000 metres steeplechase event at the 2022 British Athletics Championships, held in Manchester.
