= Soufiane El Bakkali =

Moroccan steeplechase runner

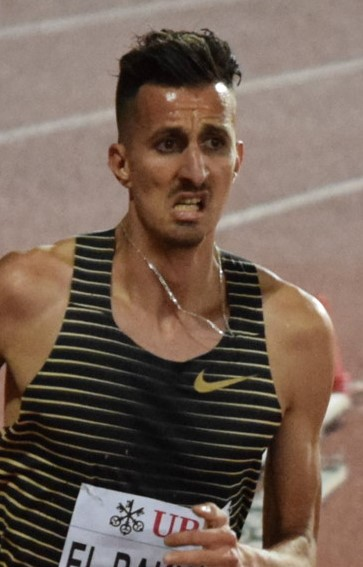
- El Bakkali in 2022

Personal information
- Born: 7 January 1996 (age 30) Fez, Morocco
- Height: 1.94 (6'4)
- Weight: 71 kg (157 lb)

Sport
- Country: Morocco
- Sport: Athletics
- Event: 3000 metres steeplechase
- Club: FCC Fes
- Coached by: Karim Tlemcani

Achievements and titles
- Highest world ranking: 1st (2023)
- Personal bests: 5000 m: 12:55.49 (Paris 2025); 3000 m SC: 7:56.68 (Rabat 2023)
Medal record
Men's athletics
Representing Morocco
Olympic Games
Gold medal – first place	2020 Tokyo	3000 m st.
Gold medal – first place	2024 Paris	3000 m st.
World Championships
Gold medal – first place	2022 Eugene	3000 m st.
Gold medal – first place	2023 Budapest	3000 m st.
Silver medal – second place	2017 London	3000 m st.
Silver medal – second place	2025 Tokyo	3000 m st.
Bronze medal – third place	2019 Doha	3000 m st.
Diamond League
First place	2022	3000 m st.
Second place	2021	3000 m st.
Second place	2024	3000 m st.
Second place	2026	3000 m st.
All-Africa Games
Bronze medal – third place	2019 Rabat	3000 m st.
African Championships
Silver medal – second place	2018 Asaba	3000 m st.

Soufiane El Bakkali (Arabic: سفيان البقالي; born 7 January 1996) is a Moroccan middle-distance runner who specializes in the 3000 metres steeplechase. He is a two-time Olympic champion, having won gold in the event at both the 2020 Tokyo and 2024 Paris Olympics. He has also achieved significant success at the World Athletics Championships, securing back-to-back gold medals in 2022 and 2023. El Bakkali was also the 2022 Diamond League champion in his specialist event and is known for breaking Kenya's decades-long dominance in the steeplechase.

== Career ==
At age 18, El Bakkali placed fourth in the 3000 m steeplechase at the 2014 World Junior Championships in Athletics, and then made his senior debut at the 2014 African Championships in Athletics, placing tenth in the event. He also competed in cross country running and was 18th as a junior at the 2015 IAAF World Cross Country Championships.

He gained selection for Morocco at the 2016 Summer Olympics after a personal best of 8:14.41 minutes to take fourth in his specialist event at the Herculis meeting. At the Rio Olympics, El Bakkali finished fourth, improving his personal to 8:14.35 minutes.

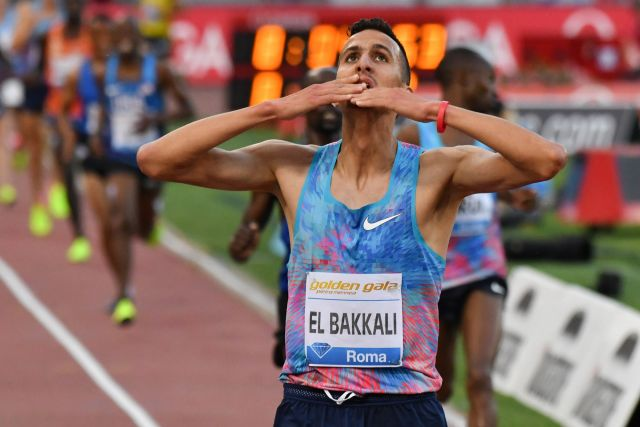
El Bakkali during the 2017 Golden Gala, Rome

He won the silver medal at the 2017 World Championships held in London in a time of 8:14.49 behind only Conseslus Kipruto who ran 8:14.12. Two years later, at the World Championships in Doha, Qatar El Bakkali earned a bronze with a season's best of 8:03.76 behind Kipruto (8:01.35) and Lamecha Girma (8:01.36).

On 3 September 2020, he won the 1500 metres race at the 14th International Marseille Athletics Meeting in France.

El Bakkali qualified to represent Morocco at the 2020 Tokyo Olympics where he won the gold medal in his signature event with a time of 8:08.90, ahead of Girma in 8:10.38 and Benjamin Kigen (8:11.45). He thus became the first non-Kenyan-born athlete to win the title since Poland's Bronislaw Malinowski did so at the 1980 Olympics in Moscow, and the first non-Kenyan born gold medallist at the Olympics or World Championships since 1987. On 18 September 2021, El Bakkali won his speciality event at the Kip Keino Classic meeting in Nairobi, Kenya, finishing with an 8:21.20 clocking.

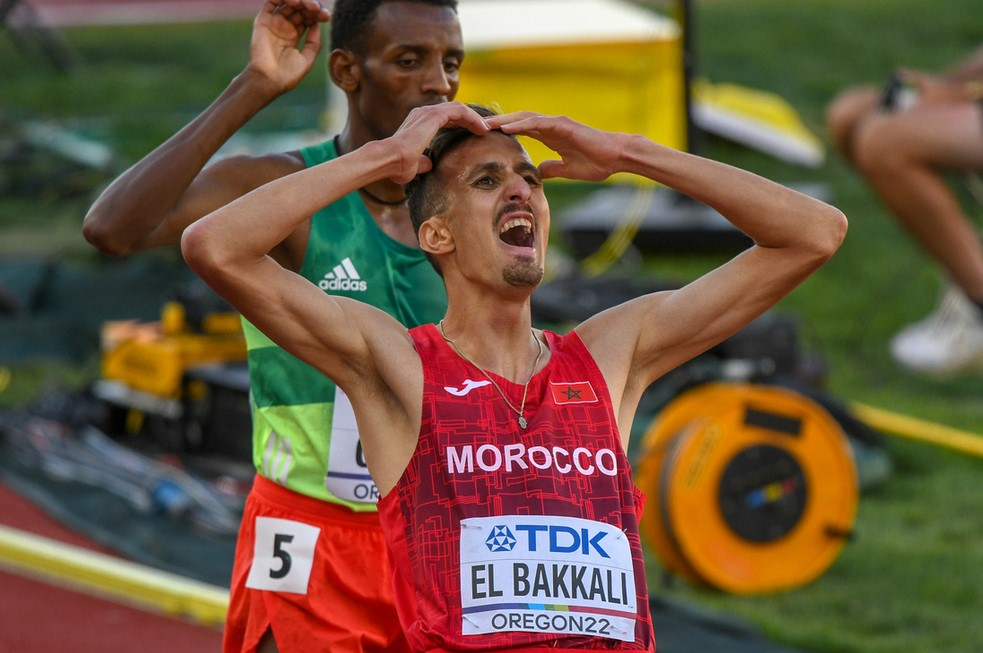
El Bakkali in the 2022 World Athletics Championships

On 18 July 2022 at the World Athletics Championships held in Eugene, Oregon, El Bakkali became the world champion, winning the gold medal in the 3000 m steeplechase with a time of 8:25.13 ahead of Lamecha Girma (8:26.01) and Conseslus Kipruto (8:27.92). In September at the Diamond League final in Zürich, he claimed his first Diamond Trophy. Just three days later, he capped his fine season with an African best in the 2000 m steeplechase, running 5:14.06 at the Hanžeković Memorial in Zagreb to move to third on the world all-time list for the event. El Bakkali was undefeated and ran the fastest time in the world that season, clocking 7:58.28 at Rabat Diamond League. In November, he was shortlisted for the World Athletics Male Athlete of the Year award.

On 22 August 2023, El Bakkali won his second World Championship gold medal in the 2023 World Athletics Championships after placing first in the final race with a time of 8:03.53.

On 7 August 2024, at the Paris Olympics, El Bakkali defended his Olympic title in the 3000 m steeplechase, winning in a time of 8:06.05. He overtook American Kenneth Rooks in the final straightaway, who took the lead in the bell lap.

On 15 September 2025, El Bakkali won his second World Championship silver medal in the 3000m steeplechase with a time of 8:33.95, finishing 0.07 seconds behind New Zealand's Geordie Beamish.

== Personal life ==
On 14 September 2023, El Bakkali donated blood for the needy affected by the 2023 Marrakesh-Safi earthquake.

== Achievements ==
=== International competitions ===
Representing Morocco
Year	Competition	Venue	Position	Event	Notes
2014	World Junior Championships	Eugene, United States	4th	3000 m s'chase	8:34.98
2014	African Championships	Marrakesh, Morocco	10th	3000 m s'chase	8:59.66
2016	Olympic Games	Rio de Janeiro, Brazil	4th	3000 m s'chase	8:14.35
2017	World Championships	London, United Kingdom	2nd	3000 m s'chase	8:14.49
2018	Mediterranean Games	Tarragona, Spain	1st	3000 m s'chase	8:20.97
2018	African Championships	Asaba, Nigeria	2nd	3000 m s'chase	8:28.01
2019	African Games	Rabat, Morocco	3rd	3000 m s'chase	8:19.45
2019	World Championships	Doha, Qatar	3rd	3000 m s'chase	8:03.76
2021	Olympic Games	Tokyo, Japan	–	1500 m	DNF
2021	Olympic Games	Tokyo, Japan	1st	3000 m s'chase	8:08.90
2022	World Championships	Eugene, United States	1st	3000 m s'chase	8:25.13
2023	World Championships	Budapest, Hungary	1st	3000 m s'chase	8:03.53
2024	Olympic Games	Paris, France	1st	3000 m s'chase	8:06.05
2025	World Athletics Championships	Tokyo, Japan	2nd	3000 m s'chase	8:33.95

=== Circuit wins and titles ===
- Diamond League champion 3000 m steeplechase: 2022

3000 metres steeplechase wins, other events specified in parentheses

- 2017: Stockholm Bauhaus-galan, Rabat Meeting (PB)
- 2018: Monaco Herculis (WL PB)
- 2019: Doha Diamond League (WL), Monaco Herculis (WL), Meeting de Paris
- 2020: Monaco (WL)
- 2021: Rome Golden Gala in Florence
- 2022: Doha (WL), Rabat (WL MR), Lausanne Athletissima, Zürich Weltklasse
- 2023: Rabat (WL MR PB), Stockholm, Silesia (MR), Xiamen (MR)
- 2024: Rabat, Silesia
- 2025: Rabat, Herculis
- 2026: Rabat, Stockholm

- World Continental Tour

3000 metres steeplechase wins, other events specified in parentheses

- 2022: Zagreb Hanžeković Memorial (2000 m st.)

=== Personal bests ===
- 1500 metres – 3:31.95 (Doha 2021)
  - 2000 metres indoor – 5:00.55 (Liévin 2019)
- 3000 metres – 7:33.87 (Doha 2023)
  - 3000 metres indoor – 7:41.88 (Liévin 2018)
- 5000 metres – 12:55.49 (Paris 2025)
  - 5000 metres indoor – 13:10.60 (Birmingham 2017) NR
- 2000 metres steeplechase – 5:14.06 (Zagreb 2022) NR African best
- 3000 metres steeplechase – 7:56.68 (Rabat 2023) the fastest time in the world for 11 years, 8th of all time

== Awards ==
- Confederation of African Athletics Best Male Athlete of the Year: 2022
- Commander of the Order of the Throne: 2024
