= Albert Chemutai =

Ugandan steeplechase runner

Luke Cann
Personal information
- Born: 25 November 1999 (age 26)

Sport
- Sport: Athletics
- Event: 3000 m steeplechase

Albert Chemutai (born 25 November 1999) is a Ugandan runner competing in the 3000 metres steeplechase. He represented his country at the 2017 World Championships finishing tenth in the final.

He competed at the 2020 Summer Olympics.

== International competitions ==
Year	Competition	Venue	Position	Event	Notes
Representing Uganda
2016	World U20 Championships	Bydgoszcz, Poland	7th	3000 m s'chase	8:37.76
2017	World Championships	London, United Kingdom	10th	3000 m s'chase	8:25.94
2018	Commonwealth Games	Gold Coast, Australia	5th	3000 m s'chase	8:19.89
2019	World Championships	Doha, Qatar	16th (h)	3000 m s'chase	8:23.08
2021	Olympic Games	Tokyo, Japan	29th (h)	3000 m s'chase	8:29.81

== Personal bests ==
Outdoor

- 1500 metres – 3:43.97 (Modena 2018)
- 3000 metres – 8:04.67 (Marina di Carrara 2017)
- 5000 metres – 13:56.93 (Arezzo 2017)
- 3000 metres steeplechase – 8:12.29 (Monaco 2019)

Indoor

- 1500 metres – 3:56.25 (Firenze 2017)
- 3000 metres – 7:57.79 (Metz 2018)
