= Boniface Abel Sikowo =

Ugandan steeplechase runner

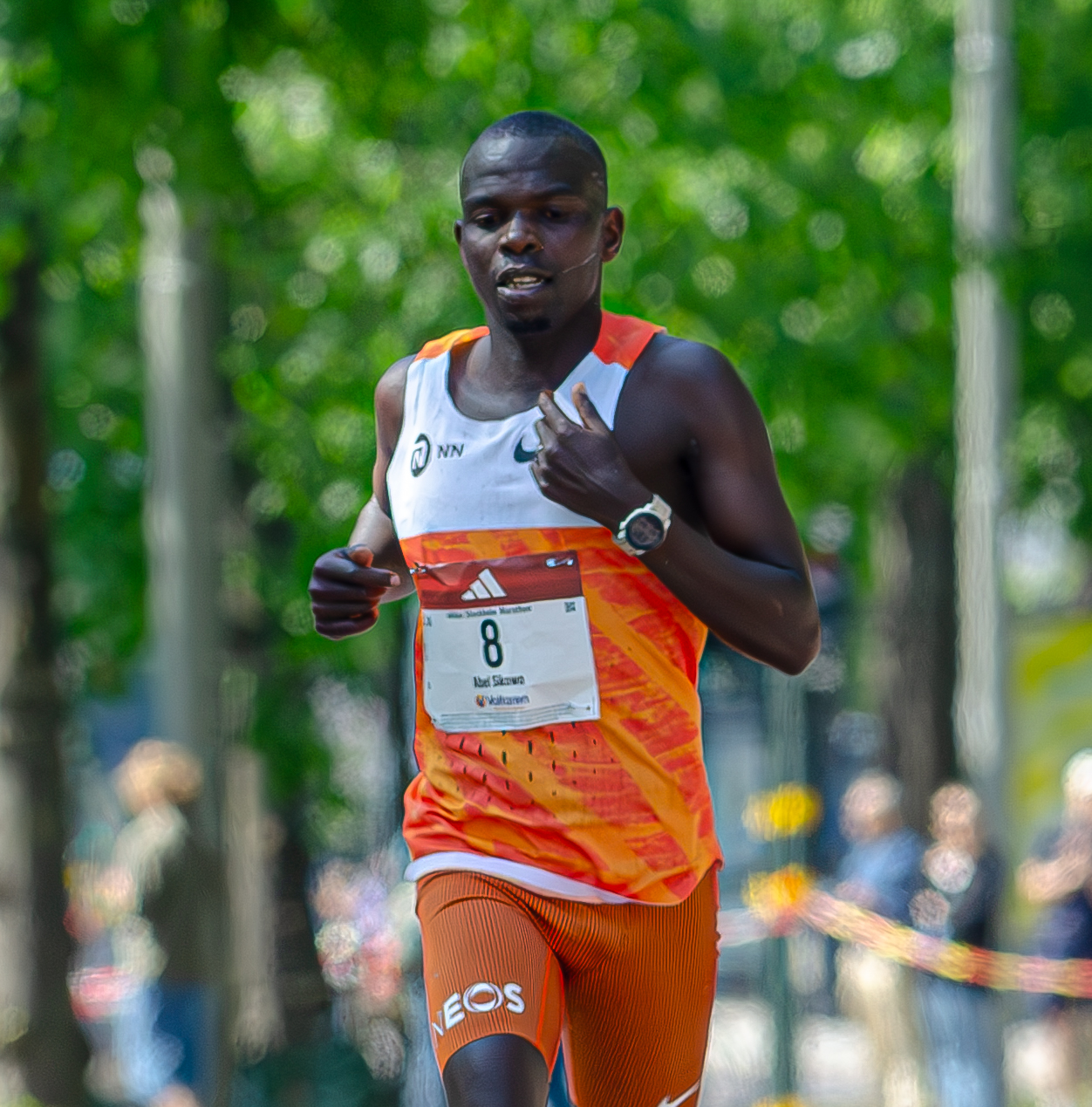
- Boniface Abel Sikowo during Stockholm Marathon 2025.

Personal information
- Born: 27 July 1999 (age 26)

Sport
- Country: Uganda
- Sport: Track and field
- Event: 3000 metres steeplechase

Boniface Abel Sikowo (born 27 July 1999) is a Ugandan track and field athlete who specializes in the 3000 metres steeplechase. In 2019, he competed in the men's 3000 metres steeplechase at the 2019 World Athletics Championships held in Doha, Qatar. He did not qualify to compete in the final.

In 2017, he competed in the men's 3000 metres steeplechase at the 2017 World Athletics Championships held in London, United Kingdom.

In 2019, he represented Uganda at the 2019 African Games held in Rabat, Morocco. He competed in the men's 3000 metres steeplechase and he finished in 5th place.

In December 2024, he won the Singapore Marathon in a time of 2:16:12.
