= Yohanes Chiappinelli =

Italian long-distance runner

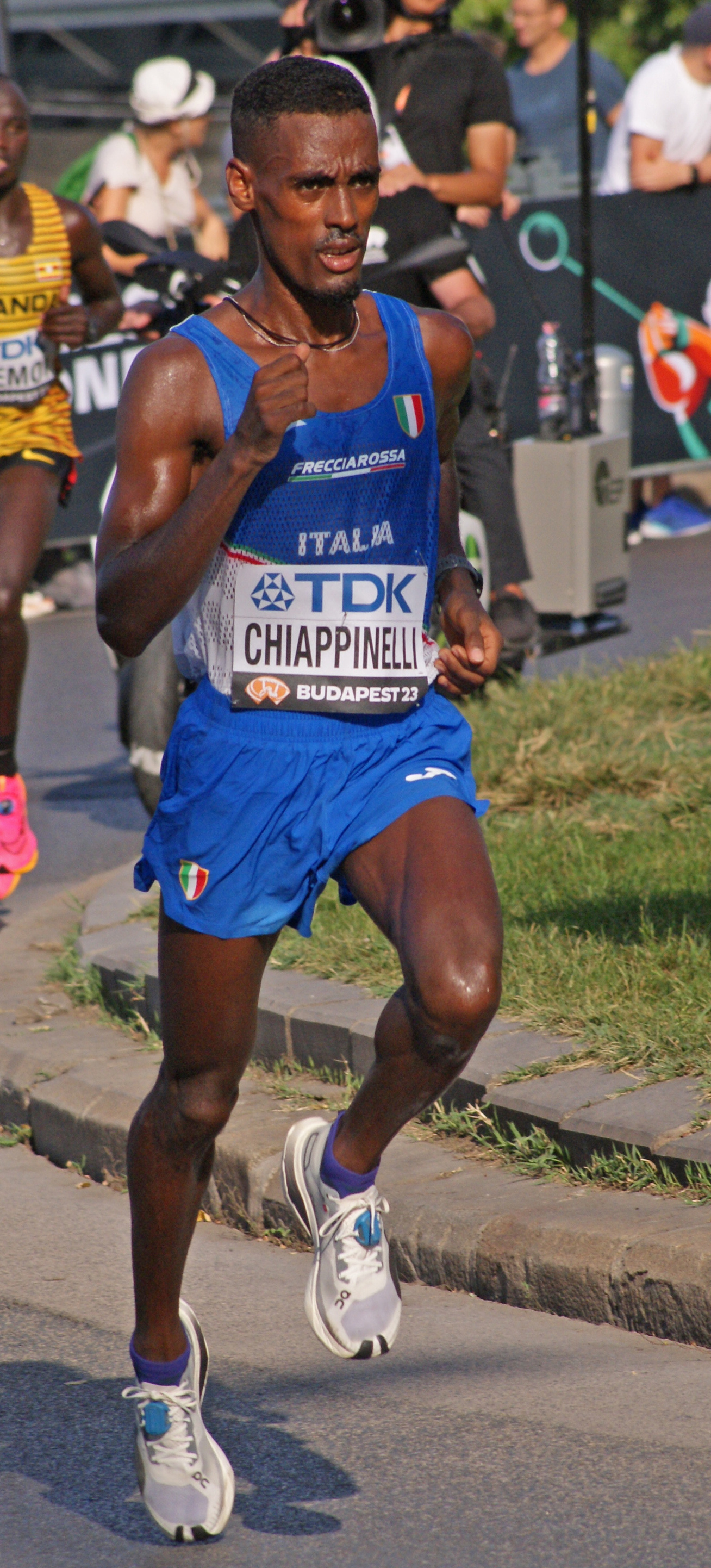
- Chiappinelli leading the group

Personal information
- Nickname: Yoghi
- Nationality: Italian
- Born: 18 August 1997 (age 29) Addis Ababa
- Height: 1.71 m (5 ft 7 1/2 in)
- Weight: 55 kg (121 lb)

Sport
- Country: Italy
- Sport: Athletics
- Event: Middle-distance running
- Club: Centro Sportivo Carabinieri
- Coached by: Maurizio Cito

Achievements and titles
- Personal bests: 3000 m steeplechase 8:24.68 (2019); Half marathon 1:00:45 (2022)
Medal record
European Championships
Bronze medal – third place	2018 Berlin	3000 m steeplechase
Mediterranean Games
Bronze medal – third place	2018 Tarragona	3000 m steeplechase
European U23 Championships
Gold medal – first place	2017 Bydgoszcz	3000 m steeplechase
European Junior Championships
Gold medal – first place	2015 Eskilstuna	3000 m steeplechase

Yohanes Chiappinelli (born 18 August 1997) is an Ethiopian-born Italian male middle-distance runner and steeplechaser.

Chiappinelli is an athlete of the Centro Sportivo Carabinieri.

== Biography ==
He won two gold medals in 3000 metres steeplechase at 2015 European Athletics U20 Championships and 2017 European Athletics U23 Championships.

== Personal best ==
- 3000 m steeplechase: 8:24.68 - (Italy) Rome, 6 June 2019

== Achievements ==
Year	Competition	Venue	Position	Event	Measure	Notes
2015	European Junior Championships	(Sweden) Eskilstuna	1st	3000 m s'chase	8:47.58	
2017	European U23 Championships	(Poland) Bydgoszcz	1st	3000 m s'chase	8:34.33	
2017	World Championships	(United Kingdom) London	30th (h)	3000 m s'chase	8:36.48	
2018	European Championships	(Germany) Berlin	3rd	3000 m s'chase	8:35:81	

== National titles ==
He won two national championships at individual senior level.

- Italian Athletics Championships
  - Half marathon: 2022
- Italian Cross Country Championships
  - Cross country running: 2018
