= Getnet Wale =

Ethiopian steeplechase runner

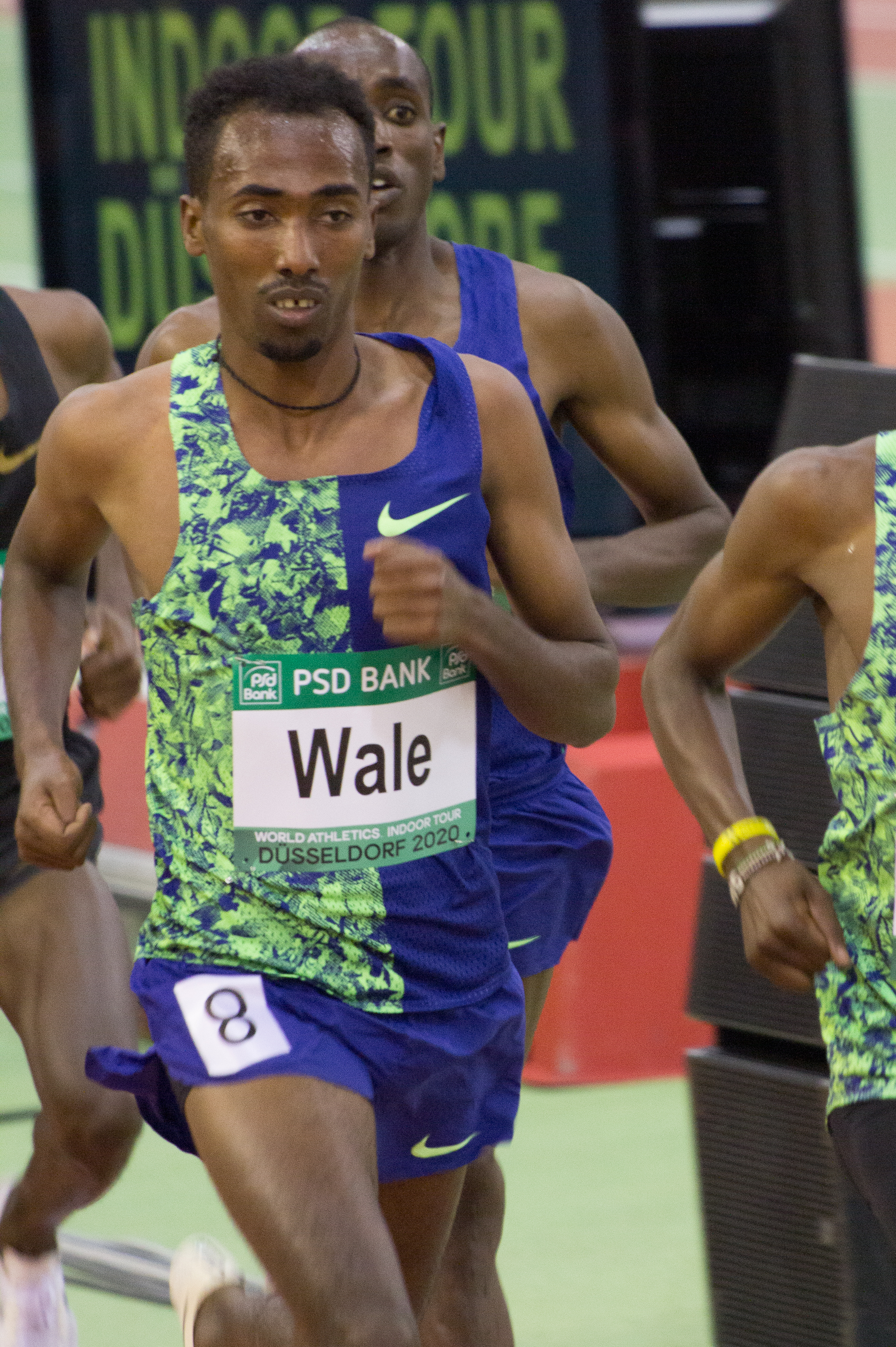
- Getnet at the PSD Bank Meeting in Düsseldorf in 2020

Personal information
- Full name: Getnet Wale Bayabl
- Born: 16 July 2000 (age 26) Gish Abay, Sekela (woreda), Ethiopia

Sport
- Country: Ethiopia
- Sport: Athletics
- Events: 3000 m steeplechase, 5000 metres

Achievements and titles
- Personal bests: 3000 m st.: 8:05.21 (Doha 2019); 5000 m: 12:53.28 (Hengelo 2021)
Medal record
Men's athletics
Representing Ethiopia
Diamond League
First place	2019	3000 m st.
African Games
Silver medal – second place	2019 Rabat	3000 m st.
African Championships
Bronze medal – third place	2018 Asaba	3000 m st.
World U20 Championships
Bronze medal – third place	2016 Bydgoszcz	3000 m st.
Bronze medal – third place	2018 Tampere	3000 m st.
World Cross Country Championships
Silver medal – second place	2023 Bathurst	Mixed relay

Getnet Wale Bayabl (born 16 July 2000) is an Ethiopian runner specialising in the 3,000 metres steeplechase. He finished fourth at the 2020 Tokyo Olympics as well as at the 2019 and 2022 World Athletics Championships. Wale won the silver medal at the 2019 African Games and a bronze at the 2018 African Championships in Athletics.

He earned bronze medals at the 2016 and 2018 World Under-20 Championships. In 2019, he became the Diamond League 3,000 m steeplechase champion. Wale is the current Ethiopian record holder in the indoor 3,000 metres.

== Early life ==
Getnet Wale was born one of eight children in Sekele, Ethiopia. He ran 4 km to and from school. After he won provincial 1,500 metres and 3,000 metres titles aged 13, steeplechase coach Teshome Kebede was interested in him and invited Wale to Addis Ababa.

== Early running career ==
Wale's first international competition came at the 2016 IAAF World Under-20 Championships in Bydgoszcz, Poland. Despite falling twice at the water jump he earned the bronze medal in the 3000 m steeplechase by placing third in 8:22.83.

In 2017, Wale competed at the 2017 World Championships in Athletics making the final and placing ninth in 8:25.28.

The next year, he competed at the 2018 IAAF World U20 Championships in Tampere, Finland, where he took bronze in 8:26.16.

In 2019, Wale contested nine 3,000 m steeplechase races including Diamond League wins in Rabat and Brussels. At the 2019 World Championships in Athletics, he placed fourth in the 3,000 m steeplechase event in a personal best time of 8:05.21.

In 2020, Wale only raced one steeplechase after an indoor track season. He competed at the Monaco Diamond League finishing 10th in 8:35.85.

=== Possible transition to 5,000m ===
On 16 January 2021, Wale placed second at the Olympic candidate trial competition in Addis Ababa. On 9 February, he ran a 7:24.98 in the 3,000 metres in Liévin, France, which was the second fastest all-time indoor time for the event, behind Daniel Komen's 7:24.90 in 1998. On 11 April, he won the Ethiopian Championships over the 5,000 metres. On 19 May, Wale won the 3,000 m steeplechase at the 60th Ostrava Golden Spike in 8:09.47. At the Ethiopian Trials on 8 June in Hengelo, Netherlands, he won the 5,000 m with a time of 12:53.28. Wale was named for the Ethiopian Olympic Team in the 5,000 m for the delayed 2020 Tokyo Olympics, where he was eliminated in the heats.

== International competitions ==
Representing Ethiopia
Year	Competition	Venue	Position	Event	Notes
2016	World U20 Championships	Bydgoszcz, Poland	3rd	3000 m s'chase	8:22.83
2017	World Championships	London, United Kingdom	9th	3000 m s'chase	8:25.28
2018	World U20 Championships	Tampere, Finland	3rd	3000 m s'chase	8:26.16
2018	African Championships	Asaba, Nigeria	3rd	3000 m s'chase	8:30.87
2019	African Games	Rabat, Morocco	2nd	3000 m s'chase	8:14.06
2019	World Championships	Doha, Qatar	4th	3000 m s'chase	8:05.21 PB
2021	Olympic Games	Tokyo, Japan	4th	3000 m s'chase	8:14.97
2021	Olympic Games	Tokyo, Japan	20th (h)	5000 m	13:41.13
2022	World Championships	Eugene, OR, United States	4th	3000 m s'chase	8:28.68
2023	World Championships	Budapest, Hungary	11th	3000 m s'chase	8:21.03
2024	World Indoor Championships	Glasgow, United Kingdom	4th	3000 m	7:44.77
2024	African Games	Accra, Ghana	5th	5000 m	13:44.45
2024	Olympic Games	Paris, France	9th	3000 m s'chase	8:12.33
2025	World Indoor Championships	Nanjing, China	11th	3000 m	7:50.07
2026	World Indoor Championships	Toruń, Poland	12th	3000 m	7:40.21

=== Circuit wins and titles ===
- Diamond League champion 3,000 m steeplechase: 2019

3,000 metres steeplechase wins, other events specified in parentheses

- 2019: Rabat Meeting (WL PB NR), Brussels Memorial Van Damme

=== National championships ===
- Ethiopian Athletics Championships
  - 3,000 metres steeplechase: 2018, 2019
  - 5,000 metres: 2021

== Personal bests ==
- 1,500 metres indoor – 3:35.54 (Val-de-Reuil 2021)

- 2,000 metres – 4:58.26 (Bydgoszcz 2020)
  - 3,000 metres indoor – 7:24.98 (Liévin 2021) NR
- 5,000 metres – 12:53.28 (Hengelo 2021)
- 3,000 metres steeplechase – 8:05.21 (Doha 2019)
