= Benjamin Kigen =

Kenyan steeplechase runner

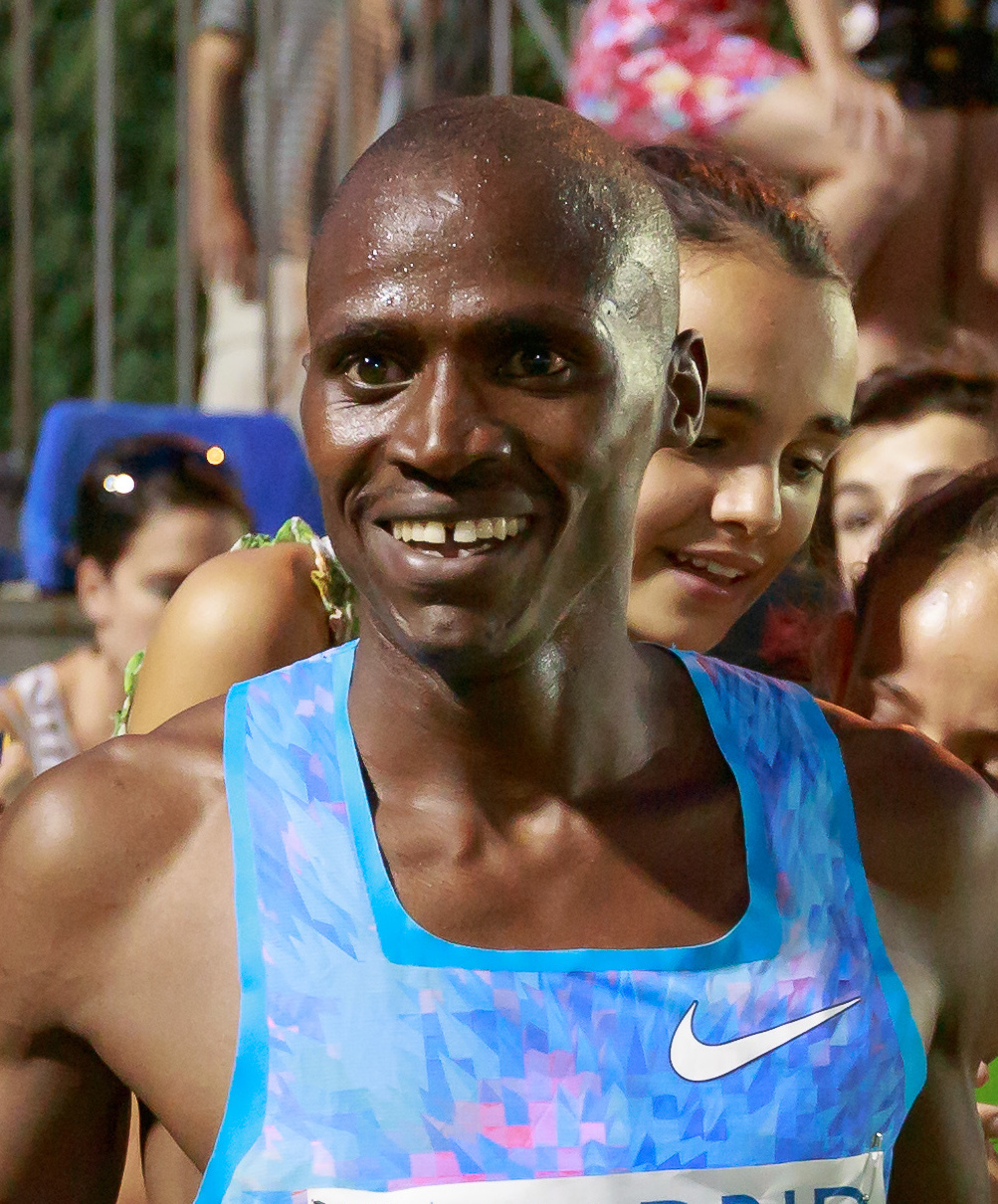
- Kigen in Madrid in 2017

Personal information
- Nationality: Kenyan
- Born: July 5, 1993 (age 33)

Sport
- Country: Kenya
- Sport: Track and field
- Event: 3000 m steeplechase

Achievements and titles
- National finals: 2018 Kenyan Champs; • 3000m s'chase, 2nd (silver); 2018 Kenyan Champs; • 3000m s'chase, 4th; 2019 Kenyan Champs; • 3000m s'chase, 1st (gold); 2019 Kenyan Champs; • 3000m s'chase, 1st (gold); 2019 Kenyan Champs; • 3000m s'chase, 2nd (silver); 2019 Kenyan Champs; • 3000m s'chase, 1st (gold); 2022 Kenyan Champs; • 3000m s'chase, 3rd (bronze); 2023 Kenyan Champs; • 3000m s'chase, 5th
- Personal best: 8:05.12 (Monaco 2019)
Medal record
Men's athletics
Representing Kenya
Olympic Games
Bronze medal – third place	2020 Tokyo	3000 m st.
African Games
Gold medal – first place	2019 Rabat	3000 m st.
Military World Games
Gold medal – first place	2019 Wuhan	3000 m st.

Benjamin Kigen (born July 5, 1993) is a Kenyan athlete who competes primarily in the 3000 metres steeplechase. He won the bronze medal at the 2020 Tokyo Olympics. Kigen took gold at the 2019 All-Africa Games.

He is from Baringo County, Kenya and trains with Amos Kirui under coach Isaac Rono.

Kigen won the 3000 m steeplechase at the 2018 Prefontaine Classic, beating 2017 world champion Conseslus Kipruto and 2016 Olympic silver medalist Evan Jager with a 57.89 second last lap.

He qualified to represent Kenya at the 2020 Tokyo Olympics, where he won the bronze medal in his specialist event with a time of 8:11.45, behind Soufiane El Bakkali (8:08.90) and Lamecha Girma (8:10.38).

His personal best is 8:05.12 (Monaco 2019).

== Achievements ==
=== International competitions ===
Year	Competition	Venue	Position	Event	Notes
2019	African Games	Rabat, Morocco	1st	3000 m st.	8:12.39
2019	World Championships	Doha, Qatar	6th	3000 m st.	8:06.95
2019	Military World Games	Wuhan, China	1st	3000 m st.	8:24.50
2021	Olympic Games	Tokyo, Japan	3rd	3000 m st.	8:11.45
2022	African Championships	Port Louis, Mauritius	6th	3000 m st.	8:38.83
2022	World Championships	Eugene, OR, United States	19th (h)	3000 m st.	8:22.52

=== Circuit wins and titles, National championships ===
- Diamond League champion 3000 m steeplechase: 2021

3000 metres steeplechase wins, other events specified in parentheses

- 2018: Eugene Prefontaine Classic (PB), Rabat Meeting
- 2019: Rome Golden Gala
- 2021: Meeting de Paris, Zürich Weltklasse

- Kenyan Athletics Championships
  - 3000 m steeplechase: 2019

=== Personal bests ===
- 800 metres – 1:57.51 (Nairobi 2021)
- 1500 metres – 3:36.36 (Madrid 2017)
- 3000 metres – 7:54.02 (Baie-Mahault 2018)
- 5000 metres – 14:02.78 (Nairobi 2022)
- 3000 metres steeplechase – 8:05.12 (Monaco 2019)
