= Yemane Haileselassie =

Eritrean steeplechase runner

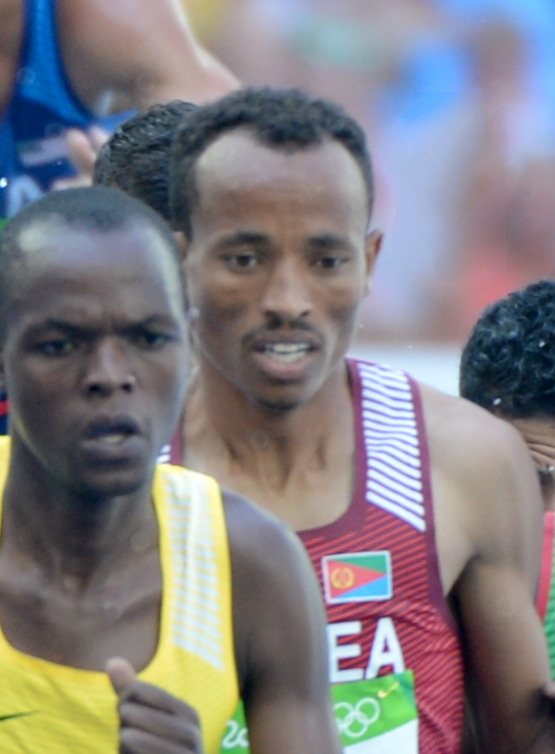
- Haileselassie at the 2016 Olympics

Personal information
- Born: 21 February 1998 (age 28) Hazega, Eritrea

Sport
- Sport: Athletics
- Events: 3000 metres steeplechase, 5000 m, 10,000 m, 10K run

Achievements and titles
- Personal bests: Track: 1500 m – 3:52.71 (2021); 3000 m – 7:53.79 (2022); 5000 m – 13:33.24 (2015); 10,000 m – 28:54.09 (2015); 3000 mS – 8:11.22 (2017); Road: 5 km – 13:34 (2022); 10 km – 28:11 (2024); 15 km – 43:23 (2024); 10 miles – 45:22 (2024); Half marathon – 1:01:34 (2024); Marathon – 2:08:25 (2025)
Medal record
Men's athletics
Representing Eritrea
African Championships
Bronze medal – third place	2018 Asaba	5000 m
World U20 Championships
Silver medal – second place	2016 Bydgoszcz	3000 m st.

Yemane Haileselassie (Tigrinya: የማነ ኀይለ ሥላሴ; born 21 February 1998) is an Eritrean male steeplechase runner. He is the national record holder at 8:22.52 minutes and represented his country at the 2016 Rio Olympics.

He made his international debut at the 2015 IAAF World Cross Country Championships and placed 23rd in the junior race and shared in the team junior bronze medals. A senior debut followed at the 2015 African Games and he placed sixth at the 3000 metres steeplechase.

At the start of the 2016 outdoor season he ran an Eritrean national record of 8:22.52 minutes. He was the fastest entrant at the 2016 IAAF World U20 Championships but was unable to break the Kenyan streak, taking the silver medal behind Amos Kirui close to his personal best with 8:22.67 minutes.

He represented Eritrea at the 2016 Summer Olympics and placed eleventh in the final. He competed at the 2020 Summer Olympics and placed fifth.

== Competition Results ==
Year	Competition	Venue	Position	Event	Notes
2015	World Cross Country Championships	Guiyang, China	23rd	Junior race	25:08
2015	World Cross Country Championships	Guiyang, China	3rd	Junior team	23 pts
2015	African Games	Brazzaville, Congo	6th	3000 m s'chase	8:32.05
2016	World U20 Championships	Bydgoszcz, Poland	2nd	3000 m s'chase	8:22.67
2016	Olympic Games	Rio de Janeiro, Brazil	11th	3000 m s'chase	8:40.68
2017	World Championships	London, United Kingdom	28th (h)	3000 m s'chase	8:35.73
2018	African Championships	Asaba, Nigeria	3rd	5000 m	13:49.58
2018	African Championships	Asaba, Nigeria	5th	3000 m s'chase	8:36.58
2019	World Championships	Doha, Qatar	23rd (h)	3000 m s'chase	8:26.58
2021	Olympic Games	Tokyo, Japan	5th	3000 m s'chase	8:15.34
2022	World Championships	Eugene, United States	7th	3000 m s'chase	8:29.40
2024	Honolulu Marathon	Honolulu, Hawaii	1st	Marathon	2:11:59
2025	Chevron Houston Marathon	Houston, United States	2nd	Marathon	2:08:25
2025	Heart to Heart 5k	Boulder, United States	1st	5K run	13:46
