= James Gormley =

Northern Irish long-distance runner

Personal information
- Nationality: British / Irish
- Born: 3 April 1998 (age 28) Sheffield, England

Sport
- Sport: Athletics
- Events: Middle-distance running, Long distance running, Cross country running

Achievements and titles
- Personal bests: 800m: 1:48.10 (Watford, 2024); 1500m: 3:36.25 (Bury, 2024); Mile: 3:53.38 (Boston, 2026); 3000m: 7:40.72 (Boston, 2025); 5000m: 13:26.24 (Boston, 2026)

James Gormley (born 3 April 1998) is an Irish middle- and long-distance runner who represents Ireland and Northern Ireland. In 2025, he became Northern Irish indoor record holder over the mile and 3000 metres.

== Early and personal life ==
Born in Sheffield, England, he is a member of the Carmen Runners club in County Tyrone. He is Northern Irish descent through his father, from Sixmilecross, Northern Ireland.

== Career ==
As a 17-year-old, he competed in the 2015 IAAF World Youth Championships where he finished fifth in the 1500m.

In 2023, he ran a 3:37.20 personal best over 1500 metres in Belgium in August 2023, and won in a 13:49 personal best in the Lancaster 5 km race. He also won over 3000 metres in the BMC Nike Grand Prix final in 7:49.61.

Gormley ran a 3000m indoor personal best of 7:53.71 in Sheffield in January 2024. He finished fourth in the 5000 metres race at the Irish National Track and Field Championships in Dublin in July 2024.

In November 2024, Gormley switched his international representation from Great Britain and Northern Ireland to Ireland.

Gormley improved his 3000m indoor best to 7:40.72 in Boston, Massachusetts in February 2025, to beat Nick Griggs' previous Northern Ireland indoor record. He ran 3:55.66 also in the United States in 2025, to set a new Northern Ireland record in the indoor mile. He finished second in the 3000 metres at the All Ireland Indoor Championships behind Seán Tobin at Abbotstown, Dublin, in February 2025. He ran for Ireland in the 3000m at the 2025 European Athletics Indoor Championships in Apeldoorn, where he did not reach the final. Later that month, he was selected for the 3000 metres race at the 2025 World Athletics Indoor Championships in Nanjing.

On 31 January 2026, Gormley ran 13:26.24 for the 5000 metres at the Boston Terrier Classic. He ran an indoor personal best in the mile run in Boston at the Saucony Battle in February 2026. His time of 3.53.38 was also a new Northern Ireland indoor record. His official 1500m split time was 3.37.60. He was selected to represent Ireland in the 1500 metres at the 2026 World Athletics Indoor Championships in Toruń, Poland, in March 2026.

Gormley competed for Northern Ireland in the mile at the 2026 Commonwealth Games in Glasgow, Scotland.
