= Abdelkarim Ben Zahra =

Moroccan steeplechase runner

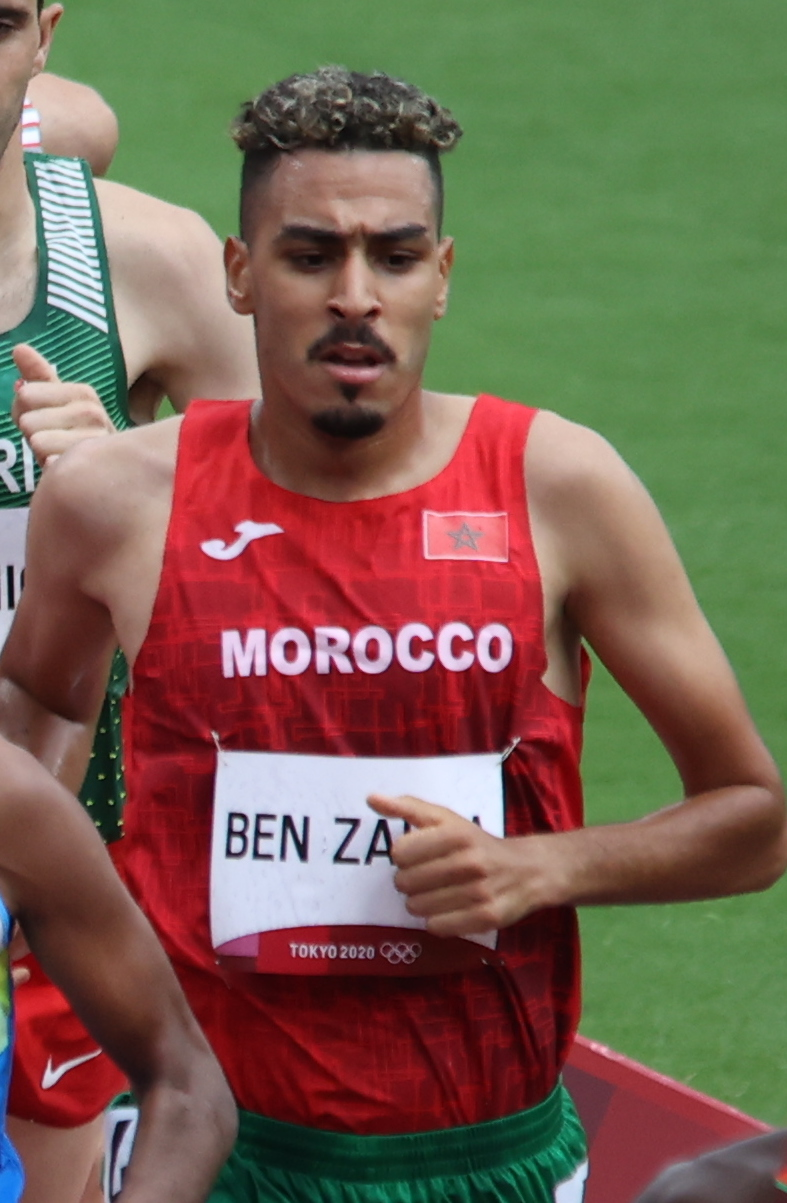
- Abdelkarim Ben Zahra at the 2020 Olympics

Personal information
- Born: 27 October 1998 (age 27)

Sport
- Country: Morocco
- Sport: Track and field
- Event: 3000 metres steeplechase

Abdelkarim Ben Zahra (born 27 October 1998) is a Moroccan track and field athlete who specializes in the 3000 metres steeplechase. In 2021, he competed in the men's 3000 metres steeplechase event at the 2020 Summer Olympics in Tokyo, Japan.

In 2017, he competed in the junior men's race at the 2017 IAAF World Cross Country Championships held in Kampala, Uganda.

In 2019, he competed in the men's 3000 metres steeplechase at the 2019 World Athletics Championships held in Doha, Qatar. He did not qualify to compete in the final.

In the same year, he represented Morocco at the 2019 African Games held in Rabat, Morocco. He competed in the men's 3000 metres steeplechase and he did not finish his race.
