= Leonard Bett =

Kenyan track and field athlete

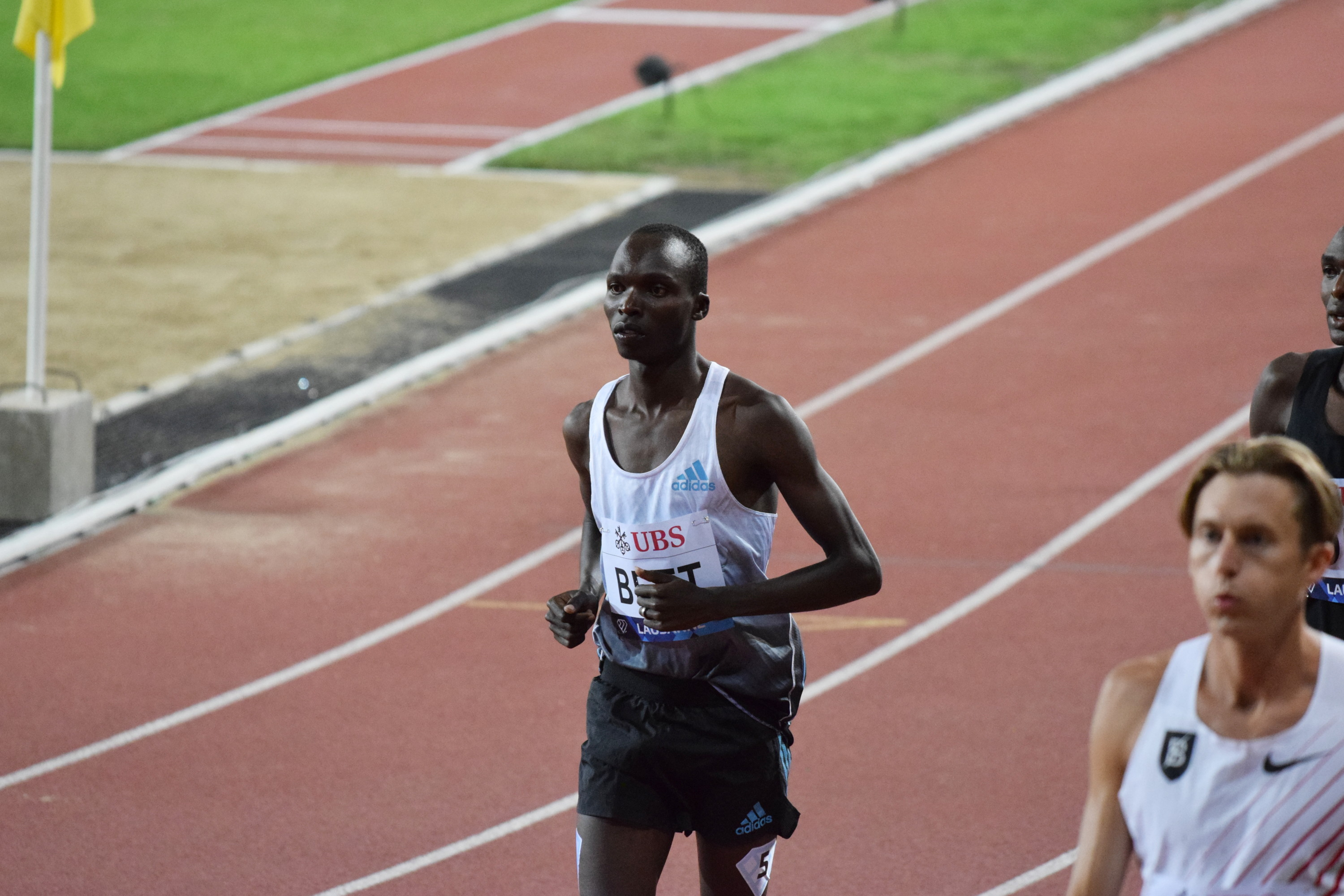
- Athletissima 2022 - Men's 3000m steeplechase

Personal information
- Full name: Leonard Kipkemoi Bett
- Nationality: Kenyan
- Born: 3 November 2000 (age 25)

Sport
- Sport: Athletics
- Events: 3000 metres steeplechase; Cross country running

Achievements and titles
- Personal bests: 1500 m: 3:45.5h (Narok 2019); 3000 m: 7:47.59 (Cambridge, MA 2018); 5000 m: 13:40.4h (Nairobi 2020); 2000 m SC: 5:28.52 (Nairobi 2017); 3000 m SC: 8:08.61 (Doha 2019); 5km: 13:31 (Herzogenaurach 2021)
Medal record
Men's athletics
Representing Kenya
Commonwealth Games
Bronze medal – third place	2026 Glasgow	3000 m st.
World U20 Championships
Silver medal – second place	2018 Tampere	3000 m st.

Leonard Kipkemoi Bett (born 3 November 2000) is a Kenyan track and field athlete who specializes in 3000 metres steeplechase and cross country running. Representing Kenya at the 2019 World Athletics Championships, he qualified for the final in men's 3000 metres steeplechase.

He competed at the 2019 IAAF World Cross Country Championships, where he placed fourth in the junior class.

He qualified to represent Kenya at the 2020 Summer Olympics, where he failed to make into the final finishing fifth in his heat.
