= Germany at the 2017 World Championships in Athletics =

- Flag of Germany
- WA code: GER
- National federation: German Athletics Association
- Website: leichtathletik.de (in German)

in London, United Kingdom 4–13 August 2017
- Competitors: 71 in 37 events
- Medals Ranked 9th: Gold 1 Silver 2 Bronze 2 Total 5

World Championships in Athletics appearances (overview)
- 1991; 1993; 1995; 1997; 1999; 2001; 2003; 2005; 2007; 2009; 2011; 2013; 2015; 2017; 2019; 2022; 2023; 2025

Germany competed at the 2017 World Championships in Athletics in London, Great Britain, from 4–13 August 2017.

== Medalists ==
Medal	Athlete	Event	Date
Gold	Johannes Vetter	Javelin throw	12 August
Silver	Carolin Schäfer	Heptathlon	6 August
Silver	Rico Freimuth	Decathlon	12 August
Bronze	Pamela Dutkiewicz	100 metres hurdles	12 August
Bronze	Kai Kazmirek	Decathlon	12 August

== Results ==
=== Men ===
Track and road events

Athlete	Event	Heat		Semifinal		Final	
Athlete	Event	Result	Rank	Result	Rank	Result	Rank
Julian Reus	100 metres	10.25	26	Did not advance			
Marc Reuther	800 metres	1:47.78	33	Did not advance			
Timo Benitz	1500 metres	3:46.01	26 Q	3:44.38	23	Did not advance	
Homiyu Tesfaye	1500 metres	3:38.57	5 Q	3:39.72	10	Did not advance	
Richard Ringer	5000 metres	13:36.87	32	—N/a		Did not advance	
Matthias Bühler	110 metres hurdles	13.52	18 q	13.79	21	Did not advance	
Julian Reus; Robert Hering; Roy Schmidt; Robin Erewa	4 × 100 metres relay	38.66	10	—N/a		Did not advance	
Nils Brembach	20 kilometres walk	—N/a				1:20:42 PB	15
Christopher Linke	20 kilometres walk	—N/a				1:19:21	4
Hagen Pohle	20 kilometres walk	—N/a				1:20:53 SB	17
Carl Dohmann	50 kilometres walk	—N/a				3:45:21 PB	10
Karl Junghannß	50 kilometres walk	—N/a				3:47:01 PB	13

Field events

Athlete	Event	Qualification		Final	
Athlete	Event	Distance	Position	Distance	Position
Eike Onnen	High jump	2.29	10 q	2.20	10
Mateusz Przybylko	High jump	2.31	4 Q	2.29	5
Raphael Holzdeppe	Pole vault	5.70	5 q	NH	–
Julian Howard	Long jump	7.72	22	Did not advance	
Max Heß	Triple jump	DNS	–	Did not advance	
David Storl	Shot put	21.41	2 Q	20.80	10
Robert Harting	Discus throw	65.31	3 Q	65.10	6
Martin Wierig	Discus throw	NM	–	Did not advance	
Andreas Hofmann	Javelin throw	85.62	5 Q	83.98	8
Thomas Röhler	Javelin throw	83.87	8 Q	88.26	4
Johannes Vetter	Javelin throw	91.20	1 Q	89.89	1st place, gold medalist(s)

Combined events – Decathlon

Athlete	Event	100 m	LJ	SP	HJ	400 m	110H	DT	PV	JT	1500 m	Final	Rank
Mathias Brugger	Result	11.15	7.18	14.80	1.90	DNS	–	–	–	–	–	DNF	–
Mathias Brugger	Points	827	857	777	714	0						DNF	–
Rico Freimuth	Result	10.53 SB	7.48	14.85	1.99	48.41 SB	13.68 SB	51.17	4.80	62.34 SB	4:41.57	8564	2nd place, silver medalist(s)
Rico Freimuth	Points	968	930	780	794	889	1016	895	849	773	670	8564	2nd place, silver medalist(s)
Kai Kazmirek	Result	10.91 SB	7.64 SB	13.78	2.11 SB	47.19 SB	14.66	45.06	5.10	62.45 SB	4:38.07 SB	8488 SB	3rd place, bronze medalist(s)
Kai Kazmirek	Points	881	970	715	906	949	891	768	941	775	692	8488 SB	3rd place, bronze medalist(s)

=== Women ===
Track and road events

Athlete	Event	Heat		Semifinal		Final	
Athlete	Event	Result	Rank	Result	Rank	Result	Rank
Gina Lückenkemper	100 metres	10.95 PB	1 Q	11.16	14	Did not advance	
Tatjana Pinto	100 metres	DQ	–	Did not advance			
Rebekka Haase	200 metres	22.99	11 Q	23.03	12	Did not advance	
Laura Müller	200 metres	DNS	–	Did not advance			
Ruth Spelmeyer	400 metres	51.72 SB	16 q	51.77	14	Did not advance	
Christina Hering	800 metres	2:01.13	11 q	2:02.69	23	Did not advance	
Hanna Klein	1500 metres	4:09.32	30 Q	4:04.45	7 Q	4:06.22	11
Konstanze Klosterhalfen	1500 metres	4:03.60	10 Q	4:06.58	16	Did not advance	
Alina Reh	5000 metres	15:10.01 PB	17	—N/a		Did not advance	
Katharina Heinig	Marathon	—N/a				2:39:59 SB	39
Fate Tola	Marathon	—N/a				2:33:39	22
Pamela Dutkiewicz	100 metres hurdles	12.74	4 Q	12.71	3 Q	12.72	3rd place, bronze medalist(s)
Nadine Hildebrand	100 metres hurdles	13.14	24	Did not advance			
Ricarda Lobe	100 metres hurdles	13.08	21 q	13.11	17	Did not advance	
Jackie Baumann	400 metres hurdles	57.59	34	Did not advance			
Gesa Felicitas Krause	3000 metres steeplechase	9:39.86	15 Q	—N/a		9:23.87	9
Tatjana Pinto; Lisa Mayer; Gina Lückenkemper; Rebekka Haase	4 × 100 metres relay	42.34	3 Q	—N/a		42.36	4
Ruth Spelmeyer; Nadine Gonska; Svea Köhrbrück; Laura Müller; Hannah Mergenthaler*	4 × 400 metres relay	3:26.24 SB	5 Q	—N/a		3:27.45	6

* – Indicates the athlete competed in preliminaries but not the final

Field events

Athlete	Event	Qualification		Final	
Athlete	Event	Distance	Position	Distance	Position
Marie-Laurence Jungfleisch	High jump	1.92	11 q	1.95	4
Friedelinde Petershofen	Pole vault	4.20	20	Did not advance	
Lisa Ryzih	Pole vault	4.55	2 q	4.65	5
Silke Spiegelburg	Pole vault	4.35	14	Did not advance	
Claudia Salman	Long jump	6.52	6 q	6.54	10
Alexandra Wester	Long jump	6.27	23	Did not advance	
Neele Eckhardt	Triple jump	14.07	11 q	13.97	12
Kristin Gierisch	Triple jump	14.25	5 Q	14.33	5
Sara Gambetta	Shot put	17.71	13	Did not advance	
Julia Harting	Discus throw	61.70	11 q	61.34	9
Nadine Müller	Discus throw	63.35	6 Q	64.13	6
Anna Rüh	Discus throw	60.78	14	Did not advance	
Kathrin Klaas	Hammer throw	70.33	12 q	68.91	11
Susen Küster	Hammer throw	62.33	30	Did not advance	
Christin Hussong	Javelin throw	60.86	17	Did not advance	
Katharina Molitor	Javelin throw	65.37 SB	3 Q	63.75	7

Combined events – Heptathlon

Athlete	Event	100H	HJ	SP	200 m	LJ	JT	800 m	Final	Rank
Claudia Salman	Result	13.52	1.74	12.84	23.92	6.55	40.70 SB	2:07.37	6362	8
Claudia Salman	Points	1047	903	717	988	1023	681	1003	6362	8
Carolin Schäfer	Result	13.09	1.86 PB	14.84 PB	23.58	6.20	49.99	2:15.34	6696	2nd place, silver medalist(s)
Carolin Schäfer	Points	1111	1054	850	1021	912	860	888	6696	2nd place, silver medalist(s)
