= 2017 World Championships in Athletics – Women's 5000 metres =

Women's 5000 metres at the 2017 World Championships
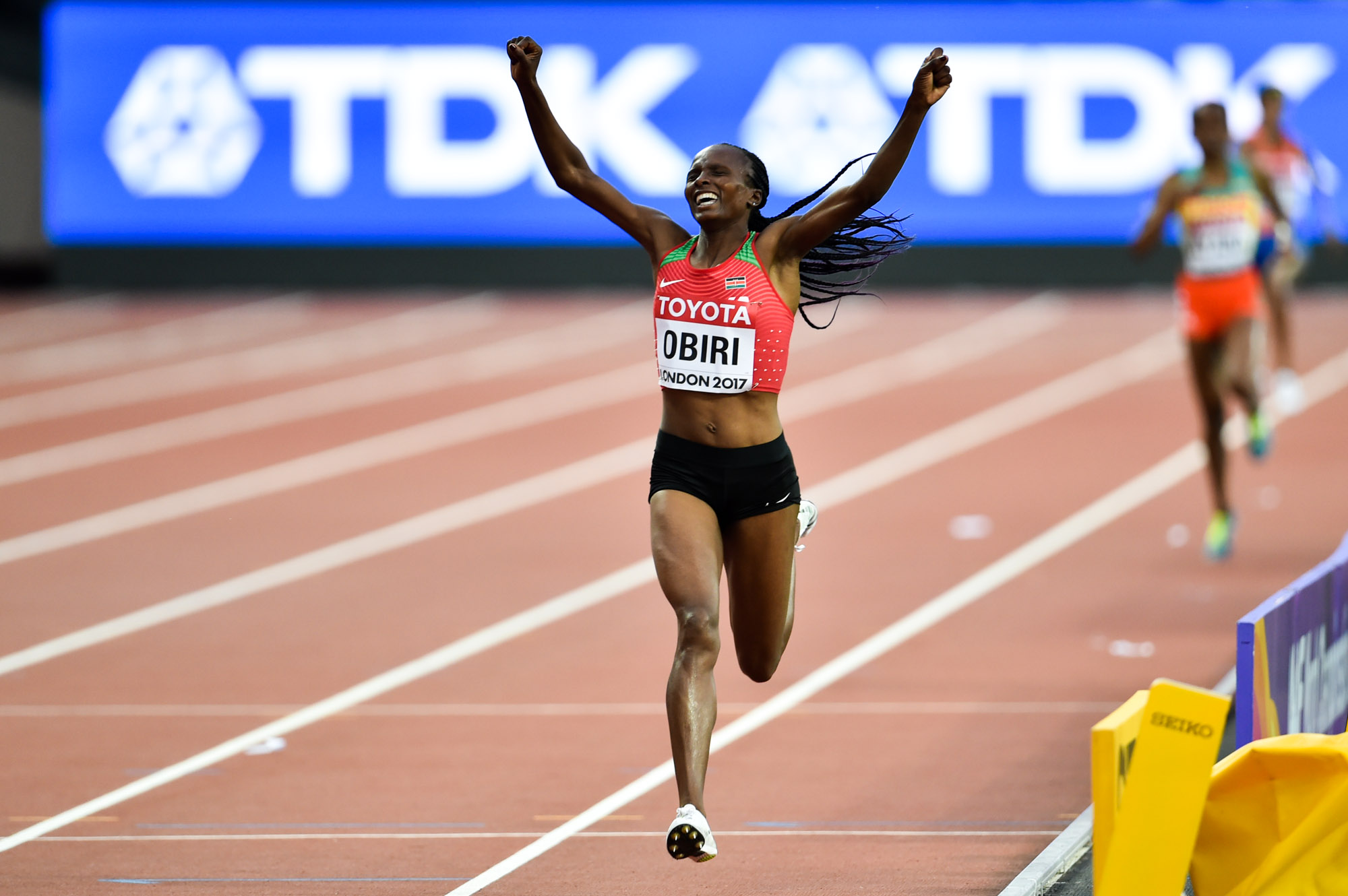
- The finish of the final.
- Venue: Olympic Stadium
- Dates: 10 August (heats); 13 August (final)
- Competitors: 32 from 17 nations
- Winning time: 14:34.86

Medalists
gold medal	Hellen Obiri	Kenya
silver medal	Almaz Ayana	Ethiopia
bronze medal	Sifan Hassan	Netherlands

The women's 5000 metres at the 2017 World Championships in Athletics was held at the London Olympic Stadium on 10 and 13 August.

== Summary ==
In the first turn of the final, Kalkidan Gezahegne (BHR) started quickly to take a two-metre lead, covered quickly by 10,000 metre champ Almaz Ayana, revealing her intent to cover moves. Hellen Obiri (KEN) moved to Ayana's shoulder. Then Sifan Hassan ran around the crowd to take the lead. In control of the front, Hassan didn't speed up, she slowed the pace to a virtual walk. Everyone obliged until the last few metres when Ayana broke free off the front. They passed the first lap in 1:21.77. Ayana's second lap of 1:18.98 didn't improve the pace much, but it separated all three Ethiopians and all three Kenyans to the front. Gezahegne rushed forward to take another temporary lead before fading back through the pack for good. From there it was Ayana setting the pace, but a pack of others, led by Hellen Obiri (KEN) were determined not to let her get away. Ayana accelerated but Obiri stuck to her, creating a ten-second breakaway on the pack led by Hassan. With 300 metres to go, Obiri took off at a pace Ayana could not match, taking the pace from 68 second laps to the last 200 metres in under 30 seconds. Running even faster, Hasan separated from the pack and set off in chase of catching Ayana for silver but arriving two seconds too late.

== Records ==
Before the competition, the records were as follows:

Record	Perf.	Athlete	Nat.	Date	Location
World	14:11.15	Tirunesh Dibaba	ETH	6 Jun 2008	Oslo, Norway
Championship	14:38.59	Tirunesh Dibaba	ETH	13 Aug 2005	Helsinki, Finland
World leading	14:18.37	Hellen Onsando Obiri	KEN	8 Jun 2017	Rome, Italy
African	14:11.15	Tirunesh Dibaba	ETH	6 Jun 2008	Oslo, Norway
Asian	14:28.09	Bo Jiang	CHN	23 Oct 1997	Shanghai, China
NACAC	14:38.92	Shannon Rowbury	USA	9 Sep 2016	Brussels, Belgium
South American	15:18.85	Simone da Silva	BRA	20 May 2011	São Paulo, Brazil
European	14:22.34	Sifan Hassan	NED	13 Jul 2018	Rabat, Marruecos
Oceanian	14:45.93	Kim Smith	NZL	11 Jul 2008	Rome, Italy

The following records were set at the competition:

Record	Perf.	Athlete	Nat.	Date
Colombian	15:26.18	Muriel Coneo	COL	10 Aug 2017

== Qualification standard ==
The standard to qualify automatically for entry was 15:22.00.

== Schedule ==
The event schedule, in local time (UTC+1), is as follows:

Date	Time	Round
10 August	18:30	Heats
13 August	19:35	Final

== Results ==
=== Heats ===
The first round took place on 10 August in two heats as follows:

Heat	1	2
Start time	18:30	18:56
Photo finish	link	link

The first five in each heat ( Q ) and the next five fastest ( q ) qualified for the final. The overall results were as follows:

Rank	Heat	Name	Nationality	Time	Notes
1	1	Hellen Obiri	Kenya	14:56.70	Q
2	1	Almaz Ayana	Ethiopia	14:57.06	Q, SB
3	1	Senbere Teferi	Ethiopia	14:57.23	Q
4	1	Susan Krumins	Netherlands	14:57.33	Q
5	1	Shannon Rowbury	United States	14:57.55	Q, SB
6	1	Sheila Chepkirui	Kenya	14:57.58	q, PB
7	2	Letesenbet Gidey	Ethiopia	14:59.34	Q
8	1	Laura Muir	Great Britain & N.I.	14:59.34	q
9	2	Sifan Hassan	Netherlands	14:59.85	Q
10	2	Shelby Houlihan	United States	15:00.37	Q, PB
11	2	Eilish McColgan	Great Britain & N.I.	15:00.38	Q, PB
12	2	Margaret Chelimo Kipkemboi	Kenya	15:00.39	Q
13	2	Karoline Bjerkeli Grøvdal	Norway	15:00.44	q, SB
14	2	Molly Huddle	United States	15:03.60	q
15	2	Kalkidan Gezahegne	Bahrain	15:07.19	q, PB
16	1	Yasemin Can	Turkey	15:08.20	
17	1	Alina Reh	Germany	15:10.01	PB
18	2	Rina Nabeshima	Japan	15:11.83	PB
19	2	Madeline Hills	Australia	15:13.77	
20	1	Ana Lozano	Spain	15:14.23	PB
21	1	Bontu Rebitu	Bahrain	15:16.70	PB
22	1	Mercyline Chelangat	Uganda	15:16.75	
23	1	Andrea Seccafien	Canada	15:19.39	
24	2	Stella Chesang	Uganda	15:23.02	
25	2	Jessica O'Connell	Canada	15:23.16	
26	1	Ayuko Suzuki	Japan	15:24.86	
27	1	Eloise Wellings	Australia	15:25.92	
28	2	Muriel Coneo	Colombia	15:26.18	NR
29	2	Heidi See	Australia	15:38.86	
30	1	Camille Buscomb	New Zealand	15:40.41	
31	2	Stephanie Twell	Great Britain & N.I.	15:41.29	
32	2	Yuliya Shmatenko	Ukraine	16:40.36	
	2	Genzebe Dibaba	Ethiopia	DNS	
	1	Sarah Lahti	Sweden	DNS	

=== Final ===
The final took place on 13 August at 19:35. The results were as follows: (photo finish)

Rank	Name	Nationality	Time	Notes
1st place, gold medalist(s)	Hellen Obiri	Kenya	14:34.86	
2nd place, silver medalist(s)	Almaz Ayana	Ethiopia	14:40.35	SB
3rd place, bronze medalist(s)	Sifan Hassan	Netherlands	14:42.73	
4	Senbere Teferi	Ethiopia	14:47.45	
5	Margaret Chelimo Kipkemboi	Kenya	14:48.74	
6	Laura Muir	Great Britain & N.I.	14:52.07	PB
7	Sheila Chepkirui	Kenya	14:54.05	PB
8	Susan Krumins	Netherlands	14:58.33	
9	Shannon Rowbury	United States	14:59.92	
10	Eilish McColgan	Great Britain & N.I.	15:00.43	
11	Letesenbet Gidey	Ethiopia	15:04.99	
12	Molly Huddle	United States	15:05.28	
13	Shelby Houlihan	United States	15:06.40	
14	Kalkidan Gezahegne	Bahrain	15:28.21	
	Karoline Bjerkeli Grøvdal	Norway	DNF	
