= Czech Republic at the 2017 World Championships in Athletics =

- Flag of the Czech Republic
- WA code: CZE
- National federation: Czech Athletics Federation
- Website: atletika.cz (in Czech)

in London, United Kingdom 4–13 August 2017
- Competitors: 27 (12 men and 15 women) in 17 events
- Medals Ranked 10th: Gold 1 Silver 1 Bronze 1 Total 3

World Championships in Athletics appearances
- 1993; 1995; 1997; 1999; 2001; 2003; 2005; 2007; 2009; 2011; 2013; 2015; 2017; 2019; 2022; 2023; 2025

Czech Republic competed at the 2017 World Championships in Athletics in London, United Kingdom, from 4–13 August 2017.

== Medallists ==
Medal	Athlete	Event	Date
Gold	Barbora Špotáková	Women's javelin throw	8 August
Silver	Jakub Vadlejch	Men's javelin throw	12 August
Bronze	Petr Frydrych	Men's javelin throw	12 August

== Results ==
=== Men ===
Track and road events

Athlete	Event	Heat		Semifinal		Final	
Athlete	Event	Result	Rank	Result	Rank	Result	Rank
Pavel Maslák	400 metres	45.10 SB	12 q	45.24	17	Did not advance	
Jakub Holuša	1500 metres	3:42.31	13 Q	3:38.05	1 Q	3:34.89	5

Field events

Athlete	Event	Qualification		Final	
Athlete	Event	Distance	Position	Distance	Position
Michal Balner	Pole vault	5.45	25	Did not advance	
Jan Kudlička	Pole vault	5.45	19	Did not advance	
Radek Juška	Long jump	8.24	1 Q	8.02	10
Ladislav Prášil	Shot put	20,04	18	Did not advance	
Tomáš Staněk	Shot put	20.76	9 Q	21.41	4
Petr Frydrych	Javelin throw	86.22 SB	2 Q	88.32 PB	3rd place, bronze medalist(s)
Jaroslav Jílek	Javelin throw	80.97	16	Did not advance	
Jakub Vadlejch	Javelin throw	83.87	9 Q	89.73 PB	2nd place, silver medalist(s)
Vítězslav Veselý	Javelin throw	75.50	26	Did not advance	

Combined events – Decathlon

Athlete	Event	100 m	LJ	SP	HJ	400 m	110H	DT	PV	JT	1500 m	Final	Rank
Adam Helcelet	Result	11.28	7.03	14.57	2.02	49.51	14.38	44.71 SB	4.90	71.56 PB	4:36.85 SB	8222	8
Adam Helcelet	Points	799	821	763	822	837	926	761	880	913	700	8222	8

=== Women ===
Track and road events

Athlete	Event	Heat		Semifinal		Final	
Athlete	Event	Result	Rank	Result	Rank	Result	Rank
Simona Vrzalová	1500 metres	DNF	–	Did not advance			
Eva Vrabcová-Nývltová	Marathon	—N/a				2:29:56 PB	14
Zuzana Hejnová	400 metres hurdles	55.05	4 Q	54.59	1 Q	54.20 SB	4
Denisa Rosolová	400 metres hurdles	55.41 SB	10 Q	56.40	17	Did not advance	
Lucie Sekanová	3000 metres steeplechase	10:09.67	37	—N/a		Did not advance	
Anežka Drahotová	20 kilometres walk	—N/a				DNF	–

Field events

Athlete	Event	Qualification		Final	
Athlete	Event	Distance	Position	Distance	Position
Michaela Hrubá	High jump	1.92	10 q	1.92	11
Romana Maláčová	Pole vault	4.35	=18	Did not advance	
Jiřina Ptáčníková	Pole vault	4.35	=18	Did not advance	
Amálie Švábíková	Pole vault	NH	–	Did not advance	
Nikola Ogrodníková	Javelin throw	59.99	17	Did not advance	
Barbora Špotáková	Javelin throw	64.32	6 Q	66.76	1st place, gold medalist(s)
Kateřina Šafránková	Hammer throw	70.67	11 q	71.34 SB	11

Combined events – Heptathlon

Athlete	Event	100H	HJ	SP	200 m	LJ	JT	800 m	Final	Rank
Kateřina Cachová	Result	13.39	1.74	11.84	24.56	6.15	43.67	2:15.58	6070	15
Kateřina Cachová	Points	1069	903	651	928	896	738	885	6070	15
Eliška Klučinová	Result	14.03	1.86	14.80	24.72	6.16	41.91	2:13.00	6313	10
Eliška Klučinová	Points	974	1055	847	913	899	704	921	6313	10
