= Puerto Rico at the 2017 World Championships in Athletics =

- Flag of Puerto Rico
- WA code: PUR
- National federation: Puerto Rican Athletics Federation
- Website: atletismofapur.com (in Spanish)

in London, United Kingdom 4–13 August 2017
- Competitors: 5 (3 men and 2 women) in 4 events
- Medals: Gold 0 Silver 0 Bronze 0 Total 0

World Championships in Athletics appearances
- 1983; 1987; 1991; 1993; 1995; 1997; 1999; 2001; 2003; 2005; 2007; 2009; 2011; 2013; 2015; 2017; 2019; 2022; 2023; 2025

Puerto Rico competed at the 2017 World Championships in Athletics in London, United Kingdom, 4–13 August 2017.

== Results ==
=== Men ===
Track and road events

Athlete	Event	Heat		Semifinal		Final	
Athlete	Event	Result	Rank	Result	Rank	Result	Rank
Andrés Arroyo	800 metres	1:46.46	19	Did not advance			
Ryan Sanchez	800 metres	1:50.74	41	Did not advance			
Javier Culson	400 metres hurdles	50.33	27	Did not advance			

=== Women ===
Track and road events

Athlete	Event	Heat		Semifinal		Final	
Athlete	Event	Result	Rank	Result	Rank	Result	Rank
Grace Claxton	400 metres hurdles	56.35	20 Q	56.40	16	Did not advance	

Combined events – Heptathlon

Athlete	Event	100H	HJ	SP	200 m	LJ	JT	800 m	Final	Rank
Alysbeth Félix	Result	14.03	1.71	10.82	25.38	5.69	40.65	2:18.88	5584	25
Alysbeth Félix	Points	974	867	583	852	807	659	842	5584	25
