= Canada at the 2017 World Championships in Athletics =

- Flag of Canada
- WA code: CAN
- National federation: Athletics Canada
- Website: athletics.ca

in London, United Kingdom 4–13 August 2017
- Competitors: 57 in 33 events
- Medals: Gold 0 Silver 0 Bronze 0 Total 0

World Championships in Athletics appearances (overview)
- 1976; 1980; 1983; 1987; 1991; 1993; 1995; 1997; 1999; 2001; 2003; 2005; 2007; 2009; 2011; 2013; 2015; 2017; 2019; 2022; 2023; 2025

Canada competed at the 2017 World Championships in Athletics in London, United Kingdom, 4–13 August 2017.

On July 18, 2017, a team of 48 athletes was announced to represent the country at the championships. The team was later increased to 57 athletes after the IAAF issued invites to athletes to round out fields in each event.

2015 double bronze medallist and three time medallist at the 2016 Summer Olympics Andre de Grasse withdrew from the competition after tearing his hamstring in practice before the competition.

== Qualification ==
To be selected to the team Canadian athletes had to meet the qualification standard and finish in the top at the 2017 Canadian. If an athlete achieves the standard and does not finish in the top two or receives an invite from the IAAF, selection to the team was up to the sole discretion of the National Team Committee. For the 10,000m, race walks and marathon the top 3 were selected from the various Canadian Championships of those events. These athletes also had to meet the qualification time/points total to be selected. If an athlete rejected a spot the next athlete (provided they met the standard) was awarded the spot up to a maximum of three.

== Results ==
Key

- Note–Ranks given for track events are for the entire round
- Q = Qualified for the next round
- q = Qualified for the next round as a fastest loser or, in field events, by position without achieving the qualifying target
- NR = National record
- GR = Games record
- PB = Personal best
- SB = Season best
- DNF = Did not finish
- DNS = Did not start
- NM = No mark
- N/A = Round not applicable for the event
- Bye = Athlete not required to compete in round

=== Men ===
Track and road events

Athlete	Event	Preliminaries		Heats		Semifinal		Final	
Athlete	Event	Result	Rank	Result	Rank	Result	Rank	Result	Rank
Andre de Grasse	100 metres	—N/a		DNS	–	Did not advance			
Brendon Rodney	100 metres	10.37	9 Q	10.36	36	Did not advance			
Gavin Smellie	100 metres	—N/a		10.29	30	Did not advance			
Aaron Brown	200 metres	—N/a		DQ	–	Did not advance			
Brandon McBride	800 metres	—N/a		1:45.69	3 Q	1:45.53	3 Q	1:47.09	8
Mohammed Ahmed	5000 metres	—N/a		13:22.97	6 q	—N/a		13:35.43	6
Justyn Knight	5000 metres	—N/a		13:30.27	17 Q	—N/a		13:39.15	9
Mohammed Ahmed	10,000 metres	—N/a						27:02.35 NR	8
Eric Gillis	Marathon	—N/a						DNF	–
Thomas Toth	Marathon	—N/a						2:23:47	54
Johnathan Cabral	110 metres hurdles	—N/a		13.53	20 Q	14.98	22	Did not advance	
Matthew Hughes	3000 metres steeplechase	—N/a		8.24.79 SB	13 Q	—N/a		8:21.84 SB	6
Gavin Smellie; Aaron Brown; Brendon Rodney; Mobolade Ajomale	4 × 100 metres relay	—N/a		38.48	8 q	—N/a		38.59	6
Benjamin Thorne	20 kilometres walk	—N/a						1:26:56	51
Mathieu Bilodeau	50 kilometres walk	—N/a						3:56:54 SB	25
Evan Dunfee	50 kilometres walk	—N/a						3:47:36	15

Field events

Athlete	Event	Qualification		Final	
Athlete	Event	Distance	Position	Distance	Position
Michael Mason	High jump	2.26	18	Did not advance	
Shawnacy Barber	Pole vault	5.70	4 q	5.65	8
Tim Nedow	Shot put	20.09	16	Did not advance	

Combined events – Decathlon

Athlete	Event	100 m	LJ	SP	HJ	400 m	110H	DT	PV	JT	1500 m	Final	Rank
Damian Warner	Result	10.50	7.44	13.45	2.02	47.47 SB	13.63	40.67	4.70 SB	56.63	4:28.39 SB	8309	5
Damian Warner	Points	975	920	695	822	935	1023	678	819	687	755	8309	5

=== Women ===
Track and road events

Athlete	Event	Heats		Semifinal		Final	
Athlete	Event	Result	Rank	Result	Rank	Result	Rank
Leya Buchanan	100 metres	11.84	36	Did not advance			
Crystal Emmanuel	100 metres	11.14 PB	11 Q	11.14 PB	11	Did not advance	
Crystal Emmanuel	200 metres	22.87	7 Q	22.85	7 q	22.60	7
Travia Jones	400 metres	54.02	47	Did not advance			
Carline Muir	400 metres	52.70	36	Did not advance			
Aiyanna Stiverne	400 metres	52.55	32	Did not advance			
Melissa Bishop	800 metres	2:01.11	10 Q	1:59.56	6 Q	1:57.68	5
Lindsey Butterworth	800 metres	2:03.19	36	Did not advance			
Annie Leblanc	800 metres	2:04.06	39	Did not advance			
Sheila Reid	1500 metres	4:13.12	38	Did not advance			
Nicole Sifuentes	1500 metres	4:05.24 SB	16 q	4:07.92	20	Did not advance	
Gabriela Stafford	1500 metres	4:04.55 PB	13 q	4:08.51	21	Did not advance	
Jessica O'Connell	5000 metres	15:23.16	25	—N/a		Did not advance	
Andrea Seccafien	5000 metres	15:19.39	23	—N/a		Did not advance	
Rachel Cliff	10,000 metres	—N/a				32:00.03 PB	20
Natasha Wodak	10,000 metres	—N/a				31:55.47 SB	16
Tarah Korir	Marathon	—N/a				2:44:30	51
Dayna Pidhoresky	Marathon	—N/a				2:56:15	70
Phylicia George	100 metres hurdles	13.01	16 Q	13.04	15	Did not advance	
Angela Whyte	100 metres hurdles	13.23	30	Did not advance			
Noelle Montcalm	400 metres hurdles	57.45	33	Did not advance			
Sage Watson	400 metres hurdles	55.06	5 Q	55.05	6 Q	54.92	6
Maria Bernard	3000 metres steeplechase	9:59.45	32	—N/a		Did not advance	
Alycia Butterworth	3000 metres steeplechase	9:51.50	26	—N/a		Did not advance	
Geneviève Lalonde	3000 metres steeplechase	9:31.81 SB	9 q	—N/a		9:29.99 NR	13
Carline Muir; Aiyanna Stiverne; Travia Jones; Natassha McDonald	4 × 400 metres relay	3:28.47 SB	11	—N/a		Did not advance	

Field events

Athlete	Event	Qualification		Final	
Athlete	Event	Distance	Position	Distance	Position
Alyxandria Treasure	High jump	1.85	=21	Did not advance	
Kelsie Ahbe	Pole vault	NH	–	Did not advance	
Anicka Newell	Pole vault	4.50	=10 q	4.45	12
Alysha Newman	Pole vault	4.55	5 q	4.65	7
Christabel Nettey	Long jump	6.36	19	Did not advance	
Brittany Crew	Shot put	18.01	8 q	18.21	6
Taryn Suttie	Shot put	16.47	25	Did not advance	
Jillian Weir	Hammer throw	NM	–	Did not advance	
Elizabeth Gleadle	Javelin throw	62.97	10 q	60.12	12
