= Netherlands at the 2017 World Championships in Athletics =

- WA code: NED
- Website: www.atletiekunie.nl

in London
- Competitors: 28
- Medals Ranked =15th: Gold 1 Silver 0 Bronze 3 Total 4

World Championships in Athletics appearances
- 1976; 1980; 1983; 1987; 1991; 1993; 1995; 1997; 1999; 2001; 2003; 2005; 2007; 2009; 2011; 2013; 2015; 2017; 2019; 2022; 2023; 2025

Netherlands competed at the 2017 World Championships in Athletics in London, Great Britain, from 4–13 August 2017.

== Medalists ==
Medal	Name	Event	Date
Gold	Dafne Schippers	Women's 200 metres	August 11
Bronze	Anouk Vetter	Women's heptathlon	August 6
Bronze	Dafne Schippers	Women's 100 metres	August 6
Bronze	Sifan Hassan	Women's 5000 metres	August 13

== Results ==
(q – qualified, NM – no mark, SB – season best)

=== Men ===
Track and road events

Athlete	Event	Heat		Semifinal		Final	
Athlete	Event	Result	Rank	Result	Rank	Result	Rank
Thijmen Kupers	800 metres	1:45.53	1 Q	DNS	–	Did not advance	
Richard Douma	1500 metres	3:55.36	41 q	3:47.74	24	Did not advance	
Giovanni Codrington; Hensley Paulina; Liemarvin Bonevacia; Taymir Burnet	4 × 100 metres relay	38.66 SB	10	—N/a		Did not advance	

Field events

Athlete	Event	Qualification		Final	
Athlete	Event	Distance	Position	Distance	Position
Menno Vloon	Pole vault	DNS	–	Did not advance	
Erik Cadée	Discus throw	58.90	25	Did not advance	

Combined events – Decathlon

Athlete	Event	100 m	LJ	SP	HJ	400 m	110H	DT	PV	JT	1500 m	Final	Rank
Pieter Braun	Result	11.22	6.87	15.23	1.96	48.54 SB	14.67	42.59	4.70	59.26	4:38.40	7890	16
Pieter Braun	Points	812	854	758	740	883	890	717	819	727	690	7890	16
Eelco Sintnicolaas	Result	10.96	7.31	14.32	1.90	48.73	14.32	40.25	DNS	–	–	DNF	–
Eelco Sintnicolaas	Points	870	888	748	714	874	934	670	0			DNF	–

=== Women ===
Track and road events

Athlete	Event	Heat		Semifinal		Final	
Athlete	Event	Result	Rank	Result	Rank	Result	Rank
Jamile Samuel	100 metres	11.52	32	Did not advance			
Naomi Sedney	100 metres	11.43	30	Did not advance			
Dafne Schippers	100 metres	11.08	7 Q	10.98	5 Q	10.96	3rd place, bronze medalist(s)
Dafne Schippers	200 metres	22.64	1 Q	22.49	1 Q	22.05 SB	1st place, gold medalist(s)
Lisanne de Witte	400 metres	52.48	30	Did not advance			
Sanne Verstegen	800 metres	2:01.50	17 q	2:00.92	15	Did not advance	
Sifan Hassan	1500 metres	4:08.89	23 Q	4:03.77	3 Q	4:03.34	5
Sifan Hassan	5000 metres	14:59.85	9 Q	—N/a		14:42.73	3rd place, bronze medalist(s)
Susan Krumins	5000 metres	14:57.33	4 Q	—N/a		14:58.33	8
Susan Krumins	10,000 metres	—N/a				31:20.24	5
Sharona Bakker	100 metres hurdles	13.12	23 q	13.29	22	Did not advance	
Eefje Boons	100 metres hurdles	13.34	32	Did not advance			
Nadine Visser	100 metres hurdles	12.96	13 Q	12.83	6 q	12.83	7
Tessa van Schagen; Dafne Schippers; Naomi Sedney; Jamile Samuel; Madiea Ghafoor*	4 × 100 metres relay	42.64	6 q	—N/a		43.07	8
Madiea Ghafoor; Lisanne de Witte; Laura de Witte; Eva Hovenkamp	4 × 400 metres relay	DQ	–	—N/a		Did not advance	

* – Indicates the athlete competed in preliminaries but not the final

Field events

Athlete	Event	Qualification		Final	
Athlete	Event	Distance	Position	Distance	Position
Melissa Boekelman	Shot put	17.88	9 q	17.73	11

Combined events – Heptathlon

Athlete	Event	100H	HJ	SP	200 m	LJ	JT	800 m	Final	Rank
Nadine Broersen	Result	13.79	1.83	14.09	24.98 SB	5.95	DNS	–	DNF	–
Nadine Broersen	Points	1008	1016	800	889	834	0		DNF	–
Anouk Vetter	Result	13.31 SB	1.77 SB	15.09	24.36	6.32 SB	58.41 CHB	2:19.43 SB	6636 NR	3rd place, bronze medalist(s)
Anouk Vetter	Points	1078	941	867	946	949	1024	831	6636 NR	3rd place, bronze medalist(s)
Nadine Visser	Result	12.85	1.77 SB	12.96	23.73	6.30 SB	42.26	2:14.74 PB	6370 SB	7
Nadine Visser	Points	1147	941	725	1007	943	711	896	6370 SB	7
