= Tamara de Sousa =

Brazilian heptathlete

Personal information
- Full name: Tamara Alexandrino de Sousa
- Nationality: Brazilian
- Born: 8 September 1993 (age 33)

Sport
- Sport: Athletics
- Event: Heptathlon

Tamara Alexandrino de Sousa (born 8 September 1993) is a Brazilian heptathlete. She competed in the women's heptathlon at the 2017 World Championships in Athletics, in London, England.
