= Ukraine at the 2017 World Championships in Athletics =

- WA code: UKR
- Website: www.flau.org.ua

in London
- Competitors: 48 in 27 events
- Medals Ranked =31th: Gold 0 Silver 1 Bronze 0 Total 1

World Championships in Athletics appearances
- 1993; 1995; 1997; 1999; 2001; 2003; 2005; 2007; 2009; 2011; 2013; 2015; 2017; 2019; 2022; 2023

Ukraine competed at the 2017 World Championships in Athletics in London, United Kingdom, from 4–13 August 2017.

== Medalists ==
Medal	Name	Event	Date
Silver	Yuliya Levchenko	Women's high jump	August 12

== Results ==
(q – qualified, NM – no mark, SB – season best)

=== Men ===
Track and road events

Athlete	Event	Heat		Semifinal		Final	
Athlete	Event	Result	Rank	Result	Rank	Result	Rank
Serhiy Smelyk	200 metres	20.58	22	Did not advance			
Ihor Olefirenko	Marathon	—				2:15:34 SB	18
Ihor Russ	Marathon	—				2:17:01 SB	27
Yuriy Rusyuk	Marathon	—				2:18:54 SB	36
Serhiy Budza	20 kilometres walk	—				1:29:25	55
Ruslan Dmytrenko	20 kilometres walk	—				1:22:26 SB	27
Ivan Losev	20 kilometres walk	—				1:23:03 SB	32
Ivan Banzeruk	50 kilometres walk	—				3:49:49	19
Igor Glavan	50 kilometres walk	—				3:41:42 SB	4
Marian Zakalnytstyi	50 kilometres walk	—				3:57:29	27

Field events

Athlete	Event	Qualification		Final	
Athlete	Event	Distance	Position	Distance	Position
Bohdan Bondarenko	High jump	2.31	2 Q	2.25	9
Andriy Protsenko	High jump	2.29	13	Did not advance	
Vladyslav Malykhin	Pole vault	5.60	17	Did not advance	
Serhiy Nykyforov	Long jump	7.47	30	Did not advance	
Serhii Reheda	Hammer throw	71.53	25	Did not advance	

Combined events – Decathlon

Athlete	Event	100 m	LJ	SP	HJ	400 m	110H	DT	PV	JT	1500 m	Final	Rank
Oleksiy Kasyanov	Result	10.77	7.28	14.99 SB	2.02 SB	48.64 SB	14.05	48.79 SB	4.70 SB	50.82	4:33.86	8234	6
Oleksiy Kasyanov	Points	912	881	789	822	878	968	845	819	601	719	8234	6

=== Women ===
Track and road events

Athlete	Event	Heat		Semifinal		Final	
Athlete	Event	Result	Rank	Result	Rank	Result	Rank
Yana Kachur	200 metres	23.47	24	Did not advance			
Anastasiia Bryzgina	400 metres	52.26	27	Did not advance			
Olha Lyakhova	800 metres	2:02.07	26	Did not advance			
Iuliia Shmatenko	5000 metres	16:40.36	32	—		Did not advance	
Viktoria Khapilina	Marathon	—				DNF	–
Darya Mykhaylova	Marathon	—				2:41:29	44
Tetyana Vernyhor	Marathon	—				2:43:12	48
Hanna Plotitsyna	100 metres hurdles	13.01	18 Q	13.08	16	Did not advance	
Olena Kolesnychenko	400 metres hurdles	56.88	28	Did not advance			
Viktoriya Tkachuk	400 metres hurdles	57.05	31	Did not advance			
Mariya Shatalova	3000 metres steeplechase	9:54.21	29	—		Did not advance	
Alina Kalistratova; Yelyzaveta Bryzgina; Yana Kachur; Hanna Plotitsyna	4 × 100 metres relay	43.77	11	—		Did not advance	
Kateryna Klymiuk; Olha Bibik; Tetyana Melnyk; Anastasiia Bryzgina	4 × 400 metres relay	3:31.84	12	—		Did not advance	
Nadiya Borovska	20 kilometres walk	—				DQ	–
Inna Kashyna	20 kilometres walk	—				1:31:24	20
Valentyna Myronchuk	20 kilometres walk	—				1:33:59 PB	32

Field events

Athlete	Event	Qualification		Final	
Athlete	Event	Distance	Position	Distance	Position
Iryna Herashchenko	High jump	1.89	=13	Did not advance	
Yuliya Levchenko	High jump	1.92	=1 q	2.01 PB	2nd place, silver medalist(s)
Oksana Okuneva	High jump	1.89	20	Did not advance	
Maryna Kylypko	Pole vault	4.20	24	Did not advance	
Maryna Bekh	Long jump	6.36	18	Did not advance	
Natalia Semenova	Discus throw	55.83	25	Did not advance	
Hanna Hatsko-Fedusova	Javelin throw	51.90	30	Did not advance	
Iryna Klymets	Hammer throw	64.20	29	Did not advance	
Iryna Novozhylova	Hammer throw	66.02	23	Did not advance	
Al'ona Shamotina	Hammer throw	64.88	25	Did not advance	

Combined events – Heptathlon

Athlete	Event	100H	HJ	SP	200 m	LJ	JT	800 m	Final	Rank
Alyna Shukh	Result	14.32 PB	1.83	13.75	26.59	5.85	52.93	2:15.84	6075	14
Alyna Shukh	Points	934	1016	777	746	804	917	881	6075	14
