= 2017 World Championships in Athletics – Men's javelin throw =

Men's javelin throw at the 2017 World Championships
- Venue: Olympic Stadium
- Dates: 10 August (qualification); 12 August (final)
- Competitors: 32 from 25 nations
- Winning distance: 89.89

Medalists
gold medal	Johannes Vetter	Germany
silver medal	Jakub Vadlejch	Czech Republic
bronze medal	Petr Frydrych	Czech Republic

Video on YouTube Official Video

The men's javelin throw at the 2017 World Championships in Athletics is being held at the Olympic Stadium on 10 and 12 August.

== Summary ==
Thirteen athletes made the automatic qualifying mark to get into the final. Five throws into the first round, Johannes Vetter (GER) threw the winner, 89.89 m (294 ft 10 in). At the end of the round, his teammate Thomas Röhler threw 87.08 m to move into second place. On the second throw of the second round, Jakub Vadlejch (CZE) threw tantalizingly close to Vetter with an 89.73 m. Three throws later, Vetter's second throw even bettered that, 89.78 m. At the end of round, Röhler improved to 88.26 m Through the next three rounds, nobody could surpass that third best throw, not even the leaders, though Petr Frydrych (CZE) threw 87.93 m twice. On his final throw, Frydrych threw 88.32m to take the bronze medal. Both Czech athletes are coached by world record holder Jan Železný. Both threw personal bests.

== Records ==
Before the competition records were as follows:

Record	Perf.	Athlete	Nat.	Date	Location
World	98.48	Jan Železný	CZE	25 May 1996	Jena, Germany
Championship	92.80	Jan Železný	CZE	12 Aug 2001	Edmonton, Canada
World leading	94.44	Johannes Vetter	GER	11 Jul 2017	Lucerne, Switzerland
African	92.72	Julius Yego	KEN	26 Aug 2015	Beijing, China
Asian	89.15	Zhao Qinggang	CHN	2 Oct 2014	Incheon, South Korea
NACAC	91.29	Breaux Greer	USA	21 Jun 2007	Indianapolis, IN, United States
South American	84.70	Edgar Baumann	PAR	17 Oct 1999	San Marcos, TX, United States
European	98.48	Jan Železný	CZE	25 May 1996	Jena, Germany
Oceanian	89.02	Jarrod Bannister	AUS	29 Feb 2008	Brisbane, Australia

No records were set at the competition.

== Qualification standard ==
The standard to qualify automatically for entry was 83.00 metres.

== Schedule ==
The event schedule, in local time (UTC+1), is as follows:

Date	Time	Round
10 August	19:05	Qualification
12 August	20:15	Final

== Results ==
=== Qualification ===
The qualification took place on 10 August, in two groups, with Group A starting at 19:03 and Group B at 20:34. Athletes attaining a mark of at least 83.00 metres ( Q ) or at least the 12 best performers ( q ) qualified for the final. The overall results were as follows:

Rank	Group	Name	Nationality	Round			Mark	Notes
Rank	Group	Name	Nationality	1	2	3	Mark	Notes
1	A	Johannes Vetter	Germany	91.20			91.20	Q
2	B	Petr Frydrych	Czech Republic	86.22			86.22	Q, SB
3	B	Keshorn Walcott	Trinidad and Tobago	86.01			86.01	Q
4	A	Tero Pitkämäki	Finland	85.97			85.97	Q
5	B	Andreas Hofmann	Germany	82.35	85.62		85.62	Q
6	B	Ioannis Kiriazis	Greece	84.60			84.60	Q
7	B	Davinder Singh Kang	India	82.22	82.14	84.22	84.22	Q
8	B	Thomas Röhler	Germany	80.88	83.87		83.87	Q
9	B	Jakub Vadlejch	Czech Republic	83.87			83.87	Q
10	B	Magnus Kirt	Estonia	83.86			83.86	Q
11	A	Ahmed Bader Magour	Qatar	83.83			83.83	Q
12	A	Julius Yego	Kenya	83.57			83.57	Q
13	A	Marcin Krukowski	Poland	81.79	77.48	83.49	83.49	Q
14	A	Hamish Peacock	Australia	77.88	82.46	82.19	82.46	
15	A	Neeraj Chopra	India	82.26	x	80.54	82.26	
16	A	Jaroslav Jílek	Czech Republic	73.48	72.79	80.97	80.97	
17	A	Andrian Mardare	Moldova	78.68	76.80	80.18	80.18	
18	B	Cyrus Hostetler	United States	77.51	75.79	79.71	79.71	
19	A	Rolands Štrobinders	Latvia	78.22	79.68	79.28	79.68	
20	B	Anderson Peters	Grenada	70.49	78.99	78.82	78.99	
21	B	Norbert Rivasz-Tóth	Hungary	78.76	74.37	74.22	78.76	
22	A	Cheng Chao-tsun	Chinese Taipei	76.58	x	77.87	77.87	
23	A	Ryohei Arai	Japan	x	77.38	74.77	77.38	
24	B	Ben Langton-Burnell	New Zealand	76.46	73.47	74.46	76.46	
25	A	Tanel Laanmäe	Estonia	76.41	73.84	x	76.41	
26	A	Vítězslav Veselý	Czech Republic	75.50	x	x	75.50	
27	A	Pavel Mialeshka	Belarus	75.33	x	x	75.33	
28	B	Braian Toledo	Argentina	75.24	x	75.29	75.29	
29	B	Alexandru Novac	Romania	74.67	x	x	74.67	
30	B	Rocco van Rooyen	South Africa	73.93	74.02	70.27	74.02	
31	B	Waruna Lakshan	Sri Lanka	73.16	x	x	73.16	
	A	Edis Matusevičius	Lithuania	x	x	x	NM	

=== Final ===
The final took place on 12 August at 20:15. The results were as follows:

Rank	Name	Nationality	Round						Mark	Notes
Rank	Name	Nationality	1	2	3	4	5	6	Mark	Notes
1st place, gold medalist(s)	Johannes Vetter	Germany	89.89	89.78	87.22	x	82.25	87.71	89.89	
2nd place, silver medalist(s)	Jakub Vadlejch	Czech Republic	77.10	89.73	85.04	86.23	87.70	83.22	89.73	PB
3rd place, bronze medalist(s)	Petr Frydrych	Czech Republic	84.31	80.48	82.94	87.93	87.93	88.32	88.32	PB
4	Thomas Röhler	Germany	87.08	88.26	x	86.14	85.97	86.40	88.26	
5	Tero Pitkämäki	Finland	83.49	x	86.94	79.69	x	x	86.94	
6	Ioannis Kiriazis	Greece	79.57	81.68	84.52	82.79	x	79.4	84.52	
7	Keshorn Walcott	Trinidad and Tobago	84.48	x	80.63	83.62	x	81.82	84.48	
8	Andreas Hofmann	Germany	75.45	83.76	80.96	83.65	81.94	83.98	83.98	
9	Marcin Krukowski	Poland	82.01	x	79.54				82.01	
10	Ahmed Bader Magour	Qatar	76.34	81.77	79.34				81.77	
11	Magnus Kirt	Estonia	80.48	x	x				80.48	
12	Davinder Singh Kang	India	75.40	x	80.02				80.02	
13	Julius Yego	Kenya	x	76.29	75.31				76.29	
