= 2017 World Championships in Athletics – Women's 400 metres hurdles =

Women's 400 metres hurdles at the 2017 World Championships in Athletics
- Venue: Olympic Stadium
- Location: London, United Kingdom
- Dates: 7 August 2015 (heats); 8 August 2015 (semifinal); 10 August 2015 (final)
- Competitors: 39 from 25 nations
- Winning time: 53.07 s

Medalists
gold medal	Kori Carter	United States
silver medal	Dalilah Muhammad	United States
bronze medal	Ristananna Tracey	Jamaica

The women's 400 metres hurdles at the 2017 World Championships in Athletics was held at the London Olympic Stadium on 7−8 and 10 August.

== Summary ==
Olympic champion Dalilah Muhammad (USA) duplicated her strategy by running aggressively from the start of the final, making up the stagger on Léa Sprunger (SUI) to her outside during the first turn and passing two-time defending champion Zuzana Hejnová (CZE) another lane over by the third hurdle. The closest to keep pace with Muhammad was Kori Carter (USA) almost unnoticed out in lane 9. By the time they arrived on the home stretch, Muhammad had a step on Carter, with Hejnová another two steps back. But Carter closed quickly, passing Muhammad before the final hurdle and running powerfully to the finish for the win. Also closing fast from two steps behind, Ristananna Tracey (JAM) caught Hejnová over the tenth hurdle and widened the gap for a clear bronze.

== Records ==
Before the competition, the records were as follows:

Record	Perf.	Athlete	Nat.	Date	Location
World	52.34	Yuliya Pechonkina	RUS	8 Aug 2003	Tula, Russia
Championship	52.42	Melaine Walker	JAM	20 Aug 2009	Berlin, Germany
World leading	52.64	Dalilah Muhammad	USA	25 Jun 2017	Sacramento, United States
African	52.90	Nezha Bidouane	MAR	25 Aug 1999	Seville, Spain
Asian	53.96	Qing Han	CHN	9 Sep 1993	Beijing, China
NACAC	52.42	Melaine Walker	JAM	20 Aug 2009	Berlin, Germany
South American	55.76	Gianna Woodruff	PAN	20 May 2017	Tucson, United States
European	52.34	Yuliya Pechonkina	RUS	8 Aug 2003	Tula, Russia
Oceanian	53.17	Debbie Flintoff-King	AUS	27 Sep 1988	Seoul, South Korea

No records were set at the competition.

== Qualification standard ==
The standard to qualify automatically for entry was 56.10.

== Schedule ==
The event schedule, in local time (UTC+1), is as follows:

Date	Time	Round
7 August	19:30	Heats
8 August	20:35	Semifinals
10 August	21:35	Final

== Results ==
=== Heats ===
The first round took place on 7 August in five heats as follows:

Heat	1	2	3	4	5
Start time	19:30	19:39	19:48	19:57	20:06
Photo finish	link	link	link	link	link

The first four in each heat ( Q ) and the next four fastest ( q ) qualified for the semifinals. The overall results were as follows:

Rank	Heat	Lane	Name	Nationality	Time	Notes
1	1	6	Dalilah Muhammad	United States	54.59	Q
2	3	2	Ristananna Tracey	Jamaica	54.92	Q
3	4	3	Kori Carter	United States	54.99	Q
4	2	8	Zuzana Hejnová	Czech Republic	55.05	Q
5	1	3	Sage Watson	Canada	55.06	Q
6	5	2	Léa Sprunger	Switzerland	55.14	Q
7	5	7	Rhonda Whyte	Jamaica	55.18	Q
8	2	4	Sara Petersen	Denmark	55.23	Q
9	5	3	Glory Onome Nathaniel	Nigeria	55.30	Q, PB
10	1	2	Denisa Rosolová	Czech Republic	55.41	Q, SB
11	1	4	Sparkle McKnight	Trinidad and Tobago	55.46	Q, SB
12	4	8	Wenda Nel	South Africa	55.47	Q
13	2	7	Cassandra Tate	United States	55.48	Q
14	4	9	Eilidh Doyle	Great Britain & N.I.	55.49	Q
15	2	5	Ayomide Folorunso	Italy	55.65	Q, SB
16	3	7	Petra Fontanive	Switzerland	56.13	Q
17	1	7	Leah Nugent	Jamaica	56.16	q
18	3	6	Shamier Little	United States	56.18	Q
19	2	3	Joanna Linkiewicz	Poland	56.18	q
20	5	5	Grace Claxton	Puerto Rico	56.35	Q
21	5	9	Yadisleidy Pedroso	Italy	56.41	q
22	5	6	Meghan Beesley	Great Britain & N.I.	56.41	q
23	5	8	Amalie Iuel	Norway	56.42	
24	1	5	Zurian Hechavarría	Cuba	56.44	
25	1	8	Lauren Wells	Australia	56.49	
26	4	2	Gianna Woodruff	Panama	56.50	Q
27	3	5	Agata Zupin	Slovenia	56.54	Q
28	3	3	Olena Kolesnychenko	Ukraine	56.88	
29	4	7	Marzia Caravelli	Italy	56.92	
30	4	6	Viktoriya Tkachuk	Ukraine	57.05	
31	2	2	Jessica Turner	Great Britain & N.I.	56.98	
32	3	8	Aminat Yusuf Jamal	Bahrain	57.41	
33	5	4	Noelle Montcalm	Canada	57.45	
34	3	4	Jackie Baumann	Germany	57.59	
35	2	6	Déborah Rodríguez	Uruguay	57.61	SB
36	2	9	Yasmin Giger	Switzerland	57.72	
37	4	4	Tia-Adana Belle	Barbados	58.82	
38	4	5	Drita Islami	Macedonia	1:00.38	
39	3	9	Kristina Pronzhenko	Tajikistan	1:03.44	

=== Semifinals ===
The semifinals took place on 8 August in three heats as follows:

Heat	1	2	3
Start time	20:35	20:45	20:55
Photo finish	link	link	link

The first two in each heat ( Q ) and the next two fastest ( q ) qualified for the final. The overall results were as follows:

Rank	Heat	Lane	Name	Nationality	Time	Notes
1	1	6	Zuzana Hejnová	Czech Republic	54.59	Q
2	2	4	Ristananna Tracey	Jamaica	54.79	Q
3	2	5	Léa Sprunger	Switzerland	54.82	Q
4	1	7	Kori Carter	United States	54.92	Q
5	3	5	Dalilah Muhammad	United States	55.00	Q
6	3	4	Sage Watson	Canada	55.05	Q
7	2	9	Cassandra Tate	United States	55.31	q
8	3	9	Eilidh Doyle	Great Britain & N.I.	55.33	q
9	2	7	Sara Petersen	Denmark	55.45	
10	1	4	Wenda Nel	South Africa	55.70	
11	1	9	Shamier Little	United States	55.76	
12	1	5	Petra Fontanive	Switzerland	55.79	
13	3	3	Yadisleidy Pedroso	Italy	55.95	
14	1	2	Leah Nugent	Jamaica	56.19	
15	1	3	Joanna Linkiewicz	Poland	56.25	
16	3	8	Grace Claxton	Puerto Rico	56.40	
17	3	7	Denisa Rosolová	Czech Republic	56.40	
18	2	8	Ayomide Folorunso	Italy	56.47	
19	1	8	Sparkle McKnight	Trinidad and Tobago	56.59	
20	2	3	Meghan Beesley	Great Britain & N.I.	56.61	
21	2	2	Agata Zupin	Slovenia	57.05	
22	3	2	Gianna Woodruff	Panama	57.32	
	2	6	Glory Onome Nathaniel	Nigeria	DQ	R 163.3(a)
	3	6	Rhonda Whyte	Jamaica	DQ	R 163.3(a)

=== Final ===
The final took place on 10 August at 21:38. The results were as follows (photo finish):

Rank	Lane	Name	Nationality	Time	Notes
1st place, gold medalist(s)	9	Kori Carter	United States	53.07	
2nd place, silver medalist(s)	4	Dalilah Muhammad	United States	53.50	
3rd place, bronze medalist(s)	7	Ristananna Tracey	Jamaica	53.74	PB
4	6	Zuzana Hejnová	Czech Republic	54.20	SB
5	5	Léa Sprunger	Switzerland	54.59	
6	8	Sage Watson	Canada	54.92	
7	3	Cassandra Tate	United States	55.43	
8	2	Eilidh Doyle	Great Britain & N.I.	55.71	
