= Géraldine Ruckstuhl =

Swiss heptathlete

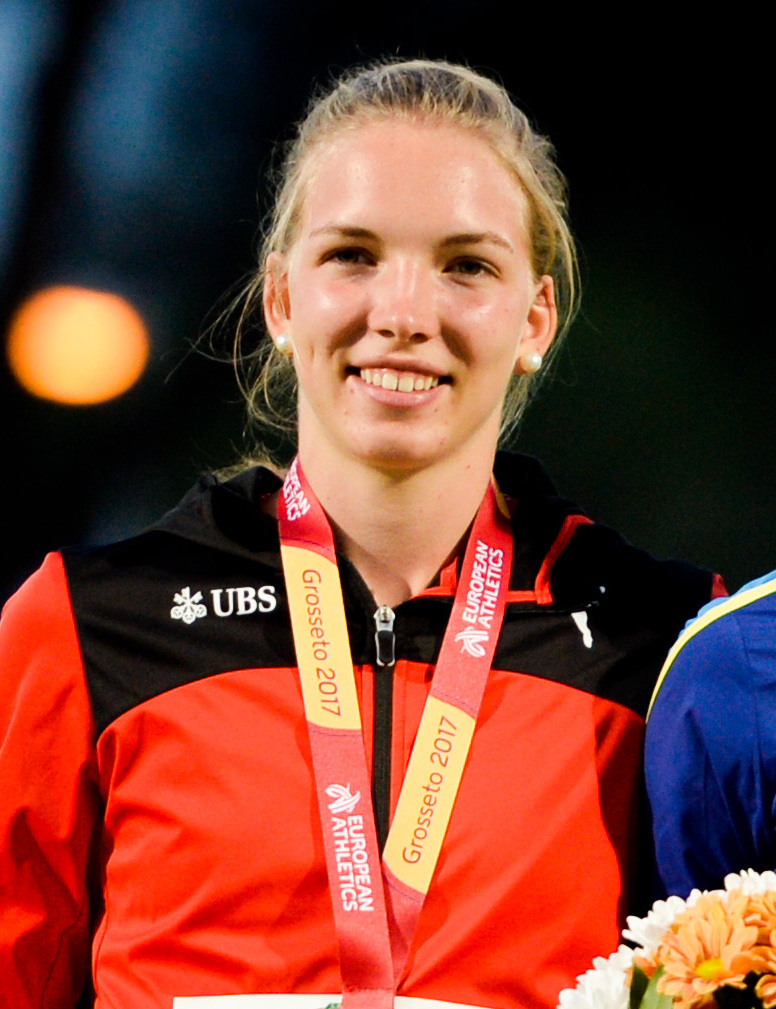
- Ruckstuhl at the 2017 European Athletics U20 Championships

Personal information
- Nationality: Swiss
- Born: 24 February 1998 (age 27)

Sport
- Sport: Athletics
- Event: Heptathlon

Géraldine Ruckstuhl (born 24 February 1998) is a Swiss heptathlete. She competed in the women's heptathlon at the 2017 World Championships in Athletics.
