= 2017 World Championships in Athletics – Women's shot put =

Women's shot put at the 2017 World Championships
- Venue: Olympic Stadium
- Dates: 8 August (qualification); 9 August (final)
- Competitors: 30 from 21 nations

Medalists
gold medal	Gong Lijiao	China
silver medal	Anita Márton	Hungary
bronze medal	Michelle Carter	United States

Video on YouTube Official Video

The women's shot put at the 2017 World Championships in Athletics was held at the Olympic Stadium on 8–9 August.

== Summary ==
The entire final was conducted in rainy conditions. Five throws in, Gong Lijiao took the early lead with a throw of 19.16 metres. Michelle Carter moved into second with 18.82 metres. Near the beginning of the second round, Anita Márton edged ahead with 18.89 metres, Gong improved to 19.35 metres, then Carter improved to 18.86 metres. In the third round, Carter improved to 19.14 metres to go back to second position. The leader board stayed that way until the fifth round when Gong improved to a winning 19.94 metres. In the final round, Márton threw 19.49 metres to take silver.

== Records ==
Before the competition records were as follows:

Record	Perf.	Athlete	Nat.	Date	Location
World	22.63	Natalya Lisovskaya	URS	7 Jun 1988	Moscow, Soviet Union
Championship	21.24	Natalya Lisovskaya	URS	5 Sep 1987	Rome, Italy
Championship	21.24	Valerie Adams	NZL	29 Aug 2011	Daegu, South Korea
World leading	20.11	Gong Lijiao	CHN	28 Jul 2017	Böhmenkirch, Germany
African	18.43	Vivian Chukwuemeka	NGR	19 Apr 2003	Walnut, California, United States
Asian	21.76	Li Meisu	CHN	23 Apr 1988	Shijiazhuang, China
NACAC	20.96	Belsy Laza	CUB	2 May 1992	Mexico City, Mexico
South American	19.30	Elisângela Adriano	BRA	14 Jul 2001	Tunja, Colombia
European	22.63	Natalya Lisovskaya	URS	7 Jun 1988	Moscow, Soviet Union
Oceanian	21.24	Valerie Adams	NZL	29 Aug 2011	Daegu, South Korea

No records were set at the competition.

== Qualification standard ==
The standard to qualify automatically for entry was 17.75 metres.

== Schedule ==
The event schedule, in local time (UTC+1), is as follows:

Date	Time	Round
8 August	20:40	Qualification
9 August	20:25	Final

== Results ==
=== Qualification ===
The qualification round took place on 8 August, in two groups, both starting at 20:39. Athletes attaining a mark of at least 18.30 metres ( Q ) or at least the 12 best performers ( q ) qualified for the final. The overall results were as follows:

Rank	Group	Name	Nationality	Round			Mark	Notes
Rank	Group	Name	Nationality	1	2	3	Mark	Notes
1	B	Gong Lijiao	China	18.97			18.97	Q
2	B	Michelle Carter	United States	18.92			18.92	Q
3	A	Anita Márton	Hungary	18.76			18.76	Q
4	A	Raven Saunders	United States	17.94	18.63		18.63	Q
5	A	Danniel Thomas-Dodd	Jamaica	x	18.42		18.42	Q
6	A	Bian Ka	China	17.82	x	18.18	18.18	q, SB
7	B	Yuliya Leantsiuk	Belarus	17.92	18.01	17.82	18.01	q
8	A	Brittany Crew	Canada	17.41	17.26	18.01	18.01	q
9	A	Melissa Boekelman	Netherlands	17.55	17.19	17.88	17.88	q
10	A	Gao Yang	China	17.82	17.87	x	17.87	q
11	B	Yaniuvis López	Cuba	x	17.84	17.84	17.84	q
12	B	Geisa Arcanjo	Brazil	17.67	17.48	17.79	17.79	q
13	B	Sara Gambetta	Germany	17.44	16.97	17.71	17.71	
14	A	Aliona Dubitskaya	Belarus	x	x	17.68	17.68	
15	B	Natalia Ducó	Chile	17.31	17.66	17.29	17.66	
16	B	Paulina Guba	Poland	17.01	17.13	17.52	17.52	
17	A	Klaudia Kardasz	Poland	16.24	16.34	17.52	17.52	
18	B	Daniella Bunch	United States	16.76	17.39	x	17.39	
19	B	Dimitriana Surdu	Moldova	17.24	17.37	x	17.37	
20	B	Fanny Roos	Sweden	16.87	x	17.31	17.31	
21	A	Radoslava Mavrodieva	Bulgaria	x	16.99	x	16.99	
22	A	Noora Salem Jasim	Bahrain	16.68	16.97	16.61	16.97	
23	A	Rachel Wallader	Great Britain & N.I.	16.73	16.81	15.83	16.81	
24	A	Jessica Cérival	France	15.80	16.56	16.32	16.56	
25	B	Taryn Suttie	Canada	16.47	x	x	16.47	
26	A	María Belén Toimil	Spain	16.20	16.38	x	16.38	
27	B	Sandra Lemos	Colombia	16.33	x	16.36	16.36	
28	B	Úrsula Ruiz	Spain	x	16.20	x	16.20	
29	B	Gleneve Grange	Jamaica	x	15.96	x	15.96	
30	A	Jessica Inchude	Guinea-Bissau	14.63	x	14.52	14.63	
	A	Auriole Dongmo	Cameroon				DNS	

=== Final ===
The final took place on 9 August at 20:25. The overall results were as follows:

Rank	Name	Nationality	Round						Mark	Notes
Rank	Name	Nationality	1	2	3	4	5	6	Mark	Notes
1st place, gold medalist(s)	Gong Lijiao	China	19.16	19.35	19.03	x	19.94	19.89	19.94	
2nd place, silver medalist(s)	Anita Márton	Hungary	18.50	18.89	18.65	18.33	18.54	19.49	19.49	
3rd place, bronze medalist(s)	Michelle Carter	United States	18.82	18.86	19.14	19.03	x	18.97	19.14	
4	Danniel Thomas-Dodd	Jamaica	18.70	x	18.76	18.56	18.91	18.76	18.91	
5	Gao Yang	China	18.03	18.00	17.79	18.22	18.11	18.25	18.25	
6	Brittany Crew	Canada	17.52	18.21	17.71	x	x	x	18.21	
7	Yuliya Leantsiuk	Belarus	17.84	x	18.12	x	x	17.51	18.12	
8	Yaniuvis López	Cuba	17.28	17.98	18.03	x	17.46	x	18.03	
9	Geisa Arcanjo	Brazil	17.93	x	18.03				18.03	
10	Raven Saunders	United States	x	13.75	17.86				17.86	
11	Melissa Boekelman	Netherlands	17.61	17.73	x				17.73	
12	Bian Ka	China	17.60	x	x				17.60	
