= Portugal at the 2017 World Championships in Athletics =

- WA code: POR
- National federation: Federação Portuguesa de Atletismo
- Website: www.fpatletismo.pt

in London
- Competitors: 21 in 17 events
- Medals Ranked =17th: Gold 1 Silver 0 Bronze 1 Total 2

World Championships in Athletics appearances
- 1980; 1983; 1987; 1991; 1993; 1995; 1997; 1999; 2001; 2003; 2005; 2007; 2009; 2011; 2013; 2015; 2017; 2019; 2022; 2023; 2025

Portugal competed at the 2017 World Championships in Athletics in London, United Kingdom, from 4–13 August 2017.

== Medalists ==
Medal	Name	Event	Date
Gold	Inês Henriques	Women's 50 km walk	August 13
Bronze	Nelson Évora	Men's triple jump	August 10

== Results ==
(q – qualified, NM – no mark, SB – season best, PB – personal best)

=== Men ===
Track and road events

Athlete	Event	Heat		Semifinal		Final	
Athlete	Event	Result	Rank	Result	Rank	Result	Rank
David Lima	100 metres	10.41	37	Did not advance			
David Lima	200 metres	20.54	21 q	20.56	13	Did not advance	
Ricardo Ribas	Marathon	—N/a				DNF	–
João Vieira	50 kilometres walk	—N/a				3:45:28 SB	11
Pedro Isidro	50 kilometres walk	—N/a				4:02:30	32

Field events

Athlete	Event	Qualification		Final	
Athlete	Event	Distance	Position	Distance	Position
Diogo Ferreira	Pole vault	NH	–	Did not advance	
Nelson Évora	Triple jump	16.94	6 q	17.19	3rd place, bronze medalist(s)
Tsanko Arnaudov	Shot put	20.08	17	Did not advance	
Francisco Belo	Shot put	19.47	29	Did not advance	

=== Women ===
Track and road events

Athlete	Event	Heat		Semifinal		Final	
Athlete	Event	Result	Rank	Result	Rank	Result	Rank
Lorène Bazolo	200 metres	23.85	39	Did not advance			
Cátia Azevedo	400 metres	52.79	39	Did not advance			
Marta Pen	1500 metres	4:10.22	32	Did not advance			
Sara Moreira	10,000 metres	—N/a				DNS	–
Carla Salomé Rocha	10,000 metres	—N/a				32:52.71	28
Filomena Costa	Marathon	—N/a				2:36.42 SB	28
Sara Catarina Ribeiro	Marathon	—N/a				DNF	–
Ana Cabecinha	20 kilometres walk	—N/a				1:28:57 SB	6
Inês Henriques	50 kilometres walk	—N/a				4:05:56 WR	1st place, gold medalist(s)

Field events

Athlete	Event	Qualification		Final	
Athlete	Event	Distance	Position	Distance	Position
Susana Costa	Triple jump	14.35 PB	3 Q	13.99	11
Patrícia Mamona	Triple jump	14.29	4 Q	14.12	9
Irina Rodrigues	Discus throw	56.98	21	Did not advance	

Combined events – Heptathlon

Athlete	Event	100H	HJ	SP	200 m	LJ	JT	800 m	Final	Rank
Lecabela Quaresma	Result	13.94	1.71	13.48	25.38	5.88	36.71	2:14.06	5788	22
Lecabela Quaresma	Points	987	867	759	852	813	604	906	5788	22
