= 2017 World Championships in Athletics – Women's heptathlon =

Women's heptathlon at the 2017 World Championships
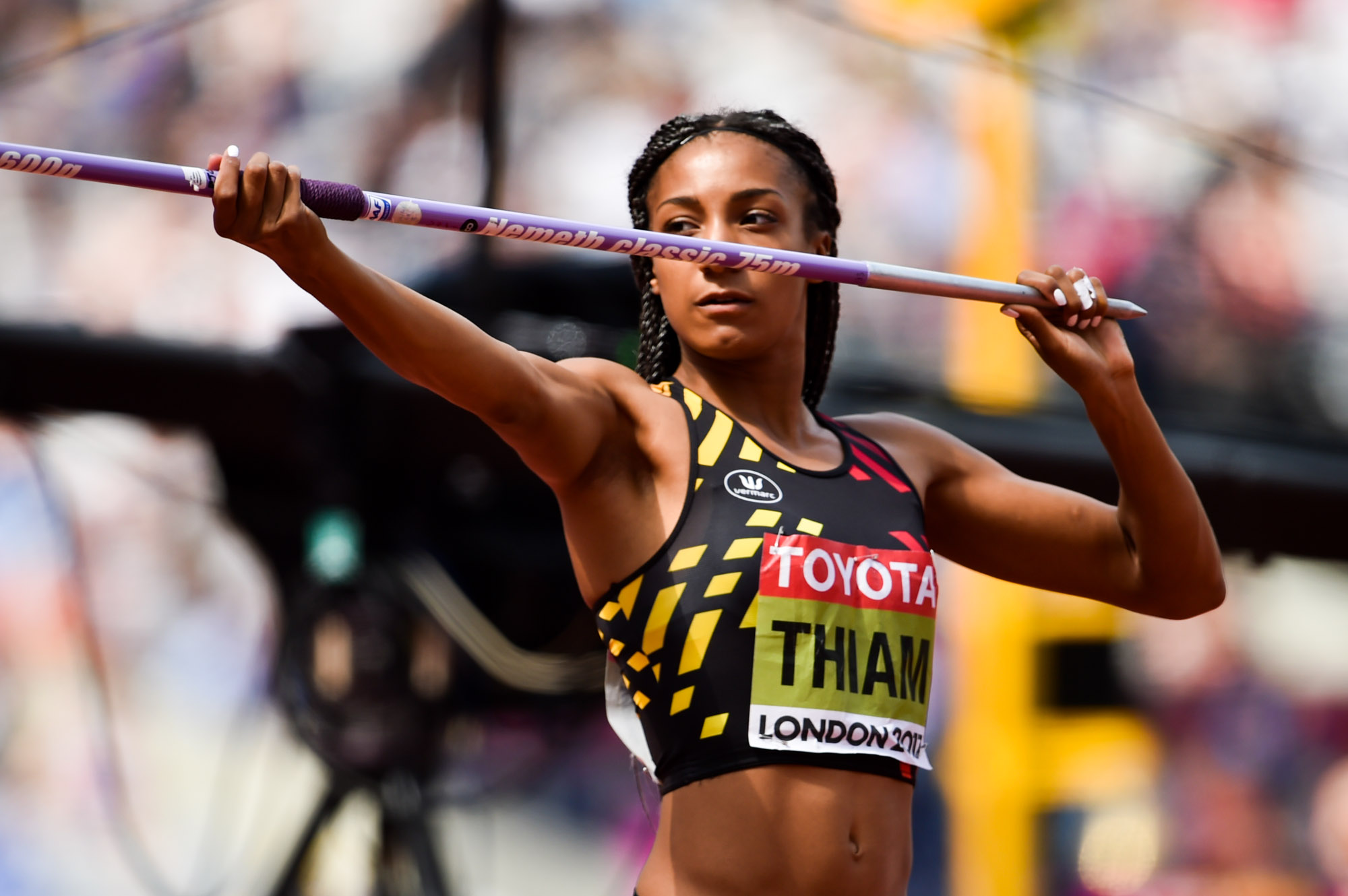
- Gold medalist Nafissatou Thiam during the javelin throw
- Venue: Olympic Stadium
- Dates: 5–6 August
- Competitors: 31 from 20 nations
- Points: 6784

Medalists
gold medal	Nafissatou Thiam	Belgium
silver medal	Carolin Schäfer	Germany
bronze medal	Anouk Vetter	Netherlands

Video on YouTube Official Video

The women's heptathlon at the 2017 World Championships in Athletics was held at the Olympic Stadium on 5–6 August.

== Summary ==
With the retirements of Jessica Ennis-Hill and Brianne Theisen-Eaton, Laura Ikauniece-Admidiņa was the only returning medalist from 2015. Since both retirees were also on the Olympic podium, that left Olympic champion Nafissatou Thiam as the clear favorite. She had scored the third best ever heptathlon score in Götzis at the end of May, her 7013 points getting close to the European Record. Ikauniece-Admidina and Carolin Schäfer had also both scored more than 6800 points with 6815 points and 6836 points respectably. Therefore three athletes had surpassed Thiam's winning score from Rio. Nevertheless, Thiam's position was emphasized when Ikauniece-Admidiņa was injured in the first event and could not continue. Yorgelis Rodríguez provided surprise competition when she made three personal bests in the high jump to stay only 8 points behind Thiam. Both Rodríguez and Thiam tied at 1.95 metres which equaled the World Championship Heptathlon Best. Home favorite Katarina Johnson-Thompson was expected to be competitive, particularly in the high jump since she holds the British record, but she only made one clearance in the competition, at 1.80 metres, significantly below her personal best of 1.98 metres. Thiam separated from Rodríguez with a shot put 1.72 metres better. Carolin Schäfer was the next closest challenger after her personal best in the shot. Thiam's normally weak 200 metres was consistent, 24.57 is only 0.17 seconds off her personal best but it opened the door for Schäfer to be the overall leader after day one. Johnson-Thompson's 22.78 roared her back into contention in fourth place.

At the beginning of the second day, Johnson-Thompson produced a 6.56 metre long jump to move up in the rankings. Rodríguez and Schäfer lost some ground with 6.23 metre and 6.20 metre jumps. On her final attempt, Thiam gained ground on all of them with her 6.57 metre best jump of the day. In the javelin throw, Thiam and Schäfer were about even through the first two throws, with Rodríguez losing about two metres to both of them and Johnson-Thompson falling well behind. On the final throw, Schäfer edged a few centimetres past Thiam's earlier throw, but Thiam unleashed a 53.93 metre throw to pad her lead by another 76 points. But the best javelin throw of the day was a World Championship Heptathlon Best 58.41 metres by Anouk Vetter, which brought her into the medal chase, displacing Rodríguez. Going into the final event, Vetter and Schäfer were virtually tied with only 3 points separation. They knew their performance in the 800 metres would determine which medal they got. With 170 points to spare, it would take a weak 800 metres by Thiam to allow either a shot at gold. Schäfer's 800 metres record was about 3 seconds faster than Vetter coming in, and needing her best Schäfer managed at 2:15.34 while Vetter visibly struggled to a 2:19.43. While Thiam's 800 metres was the third from the bottom, it was still adequate for an easy overall win by 88 points.

== Records ==
Before the competition records were as follows:

Record	Perf.	Athlete	Nat.	Date	Location
World	7291	Jackie Joyner-Kersee	USA	24 Sep 1988	Seoul, South Korea
Championship	7128	Jackie Joyner-Kersee	USA	1 Sep 1987	Rome, Italy
World leading	7013	Nafissatou Thiam	BEL	28 May 2017	Götzis, Austria
African	6423	Margaret Simpson	GHA	29 May 2005	Götzis, Austria
Asian	6942	Ghada Shouaa	SYR	26 May 1996	Götzis, Austria
NACAC	7291	Jackie Joyner-Kersee	USA	24 Sep 1988	Seoul, South Korea
South American	6270	Evelis Aguilar	COL	26 Jun 2016	Cali, Colombia
European	7032	Carolina Klüft	SWE	26 Aug 2007	Osaka, Japan
Oceanian	6695	Jane Flemming	AUS	28 Jan 1990	Auckland, New Zealand

The following records were set at the competition:

Record	Perf.	Athlete	Nat.	Date
Dutch	6636	Anouk Vetter	NED	6 Aug 2017
Cuban	6594	Yorgelis Rodríguez	CUB	6 Aug 2017
Austrian	6417	Ivona Dadic	AUT	6 Aug 2017
Championship heptathlon best – high jump	1.95	Nafissatou Thiam	BEL	5 Aug 2017
Championship heptathlon best – high jump	1.95	Yorgelis Rodríguez	CUB	5 Aug 2017
Championship heptathlon best – javelin throw	58.41	Anouk Vetter	NED	6 Aug 2017

== Qualification standard ==
The standard to qualify automatically for entry was 6200 points.

== Schedule ==
The event schedule, in local time (UTC+1), was as follows:

Date	Time	Round
5 August	10:05	100 metres hurdles
5 August	11:30	High jump
5 August	19:00	Shot put
5 August	21:00	200 metres
6 August	10:00	Long jump
6 August	11:45	Javelin throw
6 August	20:40	800 metres

== Results ==
=== 100 metres hurdles ===
The 100 metres hurdles took place on 5 August in four heats as follows:

Heat	1	2	3	4
Start time	10:05	10:13	10:24	10:33
Wind (m/s)	+0.3	−0.3	0.0	0.0
Photo finish	link	link	link	link

The overall results were as follows:

Rank	Heat	Athlete	Nationality	Result	Points	Notes
1	4	Nadine Visser	Netherlands	12.85	1147	
2	4	Kendell Williams	United States	13.02	1121	
3	4	Carolin Schäfer	Germany	13.09	1111	
4	4	Erica Bougard	United States	13.24	1089	
5	3	Anouk Vetter	Netherlands	13.31	1078	SB
6	4	Katarina Johnson-Thompson	Great Britain & N.I.	13.33	1075	
7	3	Grit Šadeiko	Estonia	13.37	1069	
8	4	Kateřina Cachová	Czech Republic	13.37	1069	
9	4	Antoinette Nana Djimou	France	13.46	1056	
10	3	Claudia Salman-Rath	Germany	13.52	1047	
11	3	Nafissatou Thiam	Belgium	13.54	1044	
12	2	Yorgelis Rodríguez	Cuba	13.60	1036	SB
13	2	Ivona Dadic	Austria	13.68	1024	PB
14	2	Xénia Krizsán	Hungary	13.70	1021	
15	3	Odile Ahouanwanou	Benin	13.71	1020	
16	4	Laura Ikauniece-Admidina	Latvia	13.71	1020	
17	2	Nadine Broersen	Netherlands	13.79	1008	
18	2	Verena Preiner	Austria	13.79	1008	PB
19	1	Géraldine Ruckstuhl	Switzerland	13.80	1007	PB
20	3	Sharon Day-Monroe	United States	13.82	1004	
21	3	Lecabela Quaresma	Portugal	13.94	987	
22	3	Caroline Agnou	Switzerland	13.95	985	
23	1	Evelis Aguilar	Colombia	14.03	974	
24	2	Alysbeth Felix	Puerto Rico	14.03	974	
25	2	Eliška Klučinová	Czech Republic	14.03	974	
26	2	Györgyi Zsivoczky-Farkas	Hungary	14.05	971	
27	1	Swapna Barman	India	14.14	959	
28	1	Tamara de Sousa	Brazil	14.16	956	
29	1	Alina Shukh	Ukraine	14.32	934	PB
30	1	Hanne Maudens	Belgium	14.47	913	
31	1	Vanessa Chefer	Brazil	14.94	850	

=== High jump ===
The high jump took place on 5 August in two groups with Group A starting at 11:29 and Group B starting at 11:30. The results were as follows:

Rnk	Grp	Athlete	Nationality	1.59	1.62	1.65	1.68	1.71	1.74	1.77	1.80	1.83	1.86	1.89	1.92	1.95	1.98	Res	Pts	Nts	Overall	
Rnk	Grp	Athlete	Nationality	1.59	1.62	1.65	1.68	1.71	1.74	1.77	1.80	1.83	1.86	1.89	1.92	1.95	1.98	Res	Pts	Nts	Pts	Rnk
1	A	Nafissatou Thiam	Belgium	–	–	–	–	–	–	–	o	–	o	o	o	o	xxx	1.95	1171	CHB	2215	1
2	A	Yorgelis Rodríguez	Cuba	–	–	–	–	–	o	–	o	o	o	xo	xxo	xo	r	1.95	1171	CHB	2207	2
3	A	Eliška Klučinová	Czech Republic	–	–	–	o	o	o	o	o	xxo	xo	xxx				1.86	1054		2028	6
3	A	Carolin Schäfer	Germany	–	–	–	–	o	xo	o	xo	o	xo	xxx				1.86	1054	PB	2165	3
5	A	Nadine Broersen	Netherlands	–	–	–	–	o	o	o	o	xo	xxx					1.83	1016		2024	7
6	A	Alina Shukh	Ukraine	–	–	–	–	–	xo	o	o	xo	xxx					1.83	1016		1950	16
7	A	Katarina Johnson-Thompson	Great Britain & N.I.	–	–	–	–	–	–	–	o	–	xxx					1.80	978		2053	5
8	A	Ivona Dadic	Austria	–	–	–	xo	o	o	o	o	xxx						1.80	978		2002	10
9	A	Géraldine Ruckstuhl	Switzerland	–	–	–	o	o	o	xxo	xxo	xxx						1.80	978		1985	12
10	A	Györgyi Zsivoczky-Farkas	Hungary	–	–	–	o	–	o	o	xxx							1.77	941		1912	20
11	A	Xénia Krizsán	Hungary	–	–	o	o	o	xxo	o	xxx							1.77	941		1962	15
12	B	Hanne Maudens	Belgium	–	–	–	–	o	o	xo	xxx							1.77	941		1854	24
12	B	Anouk Vetter	Netherlands	–	–	–	o	o	o	xo	xxx							1.77	941	SB	2019	9
14	B	Nadine Visser	Netherlands	–	–	o	o	xo	xo	xxo	xxx							1.77	941	SB	2088	4
15	B	Claudia Salman-Rath	Germany	–	o	o	o	o	o	xxx								1.74	903	SB	1950	16
15	B	Tamara de Sousa	Brazil	o	–	o	–	o	o	xxx								1.74	903		1859	23
17	A	Erica Bougard	United States	–	–	–	–	xo	o	–	xxx							1.74	903		1992	11
18	A	Sharon Day-Monroe	United States	–	–	–	–	o	xo	xxx								1.74	903		1907	21
19	A	Kendell Williams	United States	–	–	–	o	xo	xo	xxx								1.74	903		2024	7
19	B	Grit Šadeiko	Estonia	–	–	o	xo	o	xo	xxx								1.74	903		1972	13
21	B	Kateřina Cachová	Czech Republic	–	o	o	xo	o	xxo	xxx								1.74	903		1972	13
22	B	Odile Ahouanwanou	Benin	o	–	o	xxo	o	xxo	xxx								1.74	903		1923	18
23	B	Verena Preiner	Austria	–	o	o	o	o	xxx									1.71	867		1875	22
23	A	Swapna Barman	India	–	–	–	o	o	xxx									1.71	867		1826	27
25	B	Alysbeth Felix	Puerto Rico	–	–	–	xo	o	xxx									1.71	867		1841	26
26	B	Antoinette Nana Djimou	France	–	–	o	xxo	xo	xxx									1.71	867		1923	18
27	B	Lecabela Quaresma	Portugal	–	o	o	o	xxo	xxx									1.71	867		1854	24
28	B	Evelis Aguilar	Colombia	o	o	o	o	xxx										1.68	830		1804	29
29	B	Vanessa Chefer	Brazil	o	o	o	xo	xxx										1.68	830		1680	30
30	B	Caroline Agnou	Switzerland	–	–	xo	xxo	xxx										1.68	830		1815	28
–	B	Laura Ikauniece-Admidina	Latvia															DNS	0		DNF	–

=== Shot put ===
The shot put took place on 5 August in two groups with Group A starting at 18:59 and Group B starting at 19:00. The results were as follows:

Rank	Group	Name	Nationality	Round			Result	Points	Notes	Overall	
Rank	Group	Name	Nationality	1	2	3	Result	Points	Notes	Pts	Rank
1	A	Nafissatou Thiam	Belgium	15.17	14.76	14.99	15.17	872		3087	1
2	A	Sharon Day-Monroe	United States	15.14	14.65	14.79	15.14	870		2777	9
3	A	Anouk Vetter	Netherlands	13.92	15.09	x	15.09	867		2886	4
4	A	Carolin Schäfer	Germany	14.84	x	–	14.84	850	PB	3015	2
5	A	Eliška Klučinová	Czech Republic	14.80	14.76	x	14.80	848	SB	2876	5
6	A	Odile Ahouanwanou	Benin	13.84	14.71	x	14.71	841		2764	11
7	A	Antoinette Nana Djimou	France	x	14.61	x	14.61	835		2758	12
8	A	Xénia Krizsán	Hungary	14.14	13.68	13.49	14.14	803		2765	10
9	A	Nadine Broersen	Netherlands	13.46	13.91	14.09	14.09	800		2824	6
10	A	Ivona Dadic	Austria	13.82	x	13.78	13.82	782		2784	8
11	A	Alina Shukh	Ukraine	13.63	13.39	13.75	13.75	777		2727	16
12	A	Györgyi Zsivoczky-Farkas	Hungary	13.04	13.13	13.75	13.75	777		2689	17
13	A	Tamara de Sousa	Brazil	13.68	13.69	13.25	13.69	773		2632	20
14	A	Caroline Agnou	Switzerland	12.85	13.64	x	13.64	770		2585	25
15	A	Lecabela Quaresma	Portugal	13.08	13.48	13.16	13.48	759		2613	23
16	B	Yorgelis Rodríguez	Cuba	12.49	13.45	12.95	13.45	757		2964	3
17	B	Evelis Aguilar	Colombia	13.39	12.64	13.34	13.39	753		2557	26
18	B	Géraldine Ruckstuhl	Switzerland	13.07	13.06	13.36	13.36	751		2736	14
19	A	Verena Preiner	Austria	13.16	13.05	12.73	13.16	738		2613	23
20	B	Nadine Visser	Netherlands	12.22	12.76	12.96	12.96	725		2813	7
21	B	Claudia Salman-Rath	Germany	12.66	12.84	x	12.84	717		2667	19
22	B	Kendell Williams	United States	12.05	12.73	12.22	12.73	709		2733	15
23	B	Grit Šadeiko	Estonia	11.65	12.55	x	12.55	698		2670	18
24	B	Katarina Johnson-Thompson	Great Britain & N.I.	12.01	12.47	12.36	12.47	692		2745	13
25	B	Vanessa Chefer	Brazil	11.82	x	12.12	12.12	669		2349	30
26	B	Kateřina Cachová	Czech Republic	x	11.84	11.75	11.84	651		2623	21
27	B	Hanne Maudens	Belgium	10.96	11.71	11.80	11.80	648		2502	27
28	B	Erica Bougard	United States	11.41	11.31	11.19	11.41	622		2614	22
29	B	Alysbeth Felix	Puerto Rico	10.49	x	10.82	10.82	583		2424	28
30	B	Swapna Barman	India	x	7.33	10.81	10.81	583		2409	29
–	B	Laura Ikauniece-Admidina	Latvia				DNS	0		DNF	–

=== 200 metres ===
The 200 metres took place on 5 August in four heats as follows:

Heat	1	2	3	4
Start time	20:59	21:07	21:15	21:23
Wind (m/s)	−0.3	0.0	−0.4	−0.2
Photo finish	link	link	link	link

The overall results were as follows:

Rank	Heat	Athlete	Nationality	Result	Points	Notes	Overall	
Rank	Heat	Athlete	Nationality	Result	Points	Notes	Pts	Rank
1	4	Katarina Johnson-Thompson	Great Britain & N.I.	22.86	1093		3838	4
2	4	Carolin Schäfer	Germany	23.58	1021		4036	1
3	4	Erica Bougard	United States	23.66	1014		3628	17
4	4	Nadine Visser	Netherlands	23.73	1007		3820	6
5	4	Claudia Salman-Rath	Germany	23.92	988		3655	13
6	3	Odile Ahouanwanou	Benin	24.09	972	PB	3736	9
7	4	Ivona Dadic	Austria	24.11	970		3754	8
8	4	Kendell Williams	United States	24.29	953		3686	11
9	3	Evelis Aguilar	Colombia	24.35	947		3504	24
10	3	Anouk Vetter	Netherlands	24.36	946		3832	5
11	3	Yorgelis Rodríguez	Cuba	24.42	941		3905	3
12	3	Verena Preiner	Austria	24.44	939		3552	19
13	2	Kateřina Cachová	Czech Republic	24.56	928	SB	3551	21
14	2	Nafissatou Thiam	Belgium	24.57	927		4014	2
15	2	Grit Šadeiko	Estonia	24.60	924	SB	3594	18
16	2	Tamara de Sousa	Brazil	24.64	920		3552	20
17	3	Caroline Agnou	Switzerland	24.64	920		3505	23
18	2	Eliška Klučinová	Czech Republic	24.72	913	SB	3789	7
19	2	Géraldine Ruckstuhl	Switzerland	24.84	902		3638	15
20	1	Sharon Day-Monroe	United States	24.97	890		3667	12
21	1	Nadine Broersen	Netherlands	24.98	889	SB	3713	10
22	3	Vanessa Chefer	Brazil	25.15	873		3222	29
23	1	Xénia Krizsán	Hungary	25.15	873		3638	14
24	2	Antoinette Nana Djimou	France	25.17	871		3629	16
25	1	Györgyi Zsivoczky-Farkas	Hungary	25.38	852	SB	3541	22
26	1	Lecabela Quaresma	Portugal	25.38	852		3465	26
27	2	Alysbeth Felix	Puerto Rico	25.38	852		3276	28
28	3	Hanne Maudens	Belgium	25.43	848		3350	27
29	1	Swapna Barman	India	26.45	758		3167	30
30	1	Alina Shukh	Ukraine	26.59	746		3473	25

=== Long jump ===
The long jump took place on 6 August in two groups with Group A starting at 09:59 and Group B starting at 10:00. The results were as follows:

Rank	Group	Name	Nationality	Round			Result	Points	Notes	Overall	
Rank	Group	Name	Nationality	1	2	3	Result	Points	Notes	Pts	Rank
1	B	Nafissatou Thiam	Belgium	6.20	6.33	6.57	6.57	1030	SB	5044	1
2	B	Katarina Johnson-Thompson	Great Britain & N.I.	6.56	x	6.45	6.56	1027		4865	3
3	B	Claudia Salman-Rath	Germany	6.50	6.46	6.55	6.55	1023		4678	8
4	A	Anouk Vetter	Netherlands	x	5.99	6.32	6.32	949	SB	4781	5
5	A	Nadine Visser	Netherlands	5.97	6.00	6.30	6.30	943	SB	4763	6
6	B	Yorgelis Rodríguez	Cuba	5.77	6.23	4.40	6.23	921		4826	4
7	B	Caroline Agnou	Switzerland	6.05	x	6.22	6.22	918		4423	19
8	B	Carolin Schäfer	Germany	6.10	6.20	x	6.20	912		4948	2
9	B	Kendell Williams	United States	5.94	5.84	6.19	6.19	908		4594	10
10	B	Eliška Klučinová	Czech Republic	5.78	6.16	6.13	6.16	899		4688	7
11	B	Kateřina Cachová	Czech Republic	6.03	x	6.15	6.15	896		4447	16
12	B	Hanne Maudens	Belgium	5.80	6.15	5.88	6.15	896		4246	26
13	B	Erica Bougard	United States	6.01	4.53	6.09	6.09	877		4505	13
14	B	Antoinette Nana Djimou	France	6.04	5.99	6.05	6.05	865		4494	14
15	A	Grit Šadeiko	Estonia	6.00	x	5.72	6.00	850		4444	17
16	B	Ivona Dadic	Austria	5.90	5.75	5.98	5.98	843		4597	9
17	A	Verena Preiner	Austria	5.98	5.79	5.55	5.98	843		4395	21
18	A	Nadine Broersen	Netherlands	5.89	5.95	5.77	5.95	834		4547	12
19	B	Györgyi Zsivoczky-Farkas	Hungary	x	5.94	x	5.94	831		4372	22
20	A	Xénia Krizsán	Hungary	x	5.93	x	5.93	828		4466	15
21	A	Odile Ahouanwanou	Benin	5.38	5.92	5.46	5.92	825	PB	4561	11
22	A	Lecabela Quaresma	Portugal	5.88	x	5.84	5.88	813		4278	24
23	A	Alysbeth Felix	Puerto Rico	x	5.85	5.86	5.86	807	SB	4083	27
24	A	Alina Shukh	Ukraine	x	5.80	5.85	5.85	804		4277	25
25	A	Géraldine Ruckstuhl	Switzerland	5.37	5.69	5.82	5.82	795		4433	18
26	A	Tamara de Sousa	Brazil	5.69	x	5.40	5.69	756		4308	23
27	A	Sharon Day-Monroe	United States	5.49	5.61	x	5.61	732		4399	20
28	A	Swapna Barman	India	5.48	5.53	5.49	5.53	709		3876	28
29	A	Vanessa Chefer	Brazil	x	5.22	5.23	5.23	623		3845	29
–	B	Evelis Aguilar	Colombia				DNS	0		DNF	–

=== Javelin throw ===
The javelin throw took place on 6 August in two groups with Group A starting at 11:54 and Group B starting at 13:07. The results were as follows:

Rank	Group	Name	Nationality	Round			Result	Points	Notes	Overall	
Rank	Group	Name	Nationality	1	2	3	Result	Points	Notes	Pts	Rank
1	B	Anouk Vetter	Netherlands	55.32	x	58.41	58.41	1024	CHB	5805	3
2	B	Nafissatou Thiam	Belgium	49.93	48.68	53.93	53.93	936		5980	1
3	B	Alina Shukh	Ukraine	49.91	52.93	49.62	52.93	917		5194	16
4	A	Ivona Dadic	Austria	47.51	52.29	x	52.29	905	SB	5502	6
5	B	Géraldine Ruckstuhl	Switzerland	52.15	51.16	46.78	52.15	902		5335	12
6	B	Xénia Krizsán	Hungary	49.55	50.36	51.25	51.25	884	PB	5350	11
7	B	Carolin Schäfer	Germany	49.68	49.27	49.99	49.99	860		5808	2
8	B	Grit Šadeiko	Estonia	46.84	46.16	47.47	47.47	811		5255	15
9	B	Yorgelis Rodríguez	Cuba	x	47.41	x	47.41	810		5636	4
10	B	Kendell Williams	United States	x	41.45	46.43	46.43	791		5385	9
11	B	Verena Preiner	Austria	43.13	45.27	43.79	45.27	769		5164	18
12	A	Györgyi Zsivoczky-Farkas	Hungary	44.22	44.53	44.95	44.95	763		5135	20
13	B	Antoinette Nana Djimou	France	44.94	43.93	-	44.94	762		5256	14
14	B	Kateřina Cachová	Czech Republic	43.67	43.29	43.38	43.67	738		5185	17
15	A	Caroline Agnou	Switzerland	42.85	43.54	41.77	43.54	735		5158	19
16	A	Swapna Barman	India	38.84	43.49	43.37	43.49	734		4610	27
17	A	Odile Ahouanwanou	Benin	37.92	43.16	x	43.16	728		5289	13
18	A	Nadine Visser	Netherlands	x	38.82	42.26	42.26	711		5474	7
19	A	Eliška Klučinová	Czech Republic	41.91	x	39.24	41.91	704	SB	5392	8
20	A	Katarina Johnson-Thompson	Great Britain & N.I.	41.72	40.27	41.65	41.72	700	SB	5565	5
21	B	Sharon Day-Monroe	United States	39.43	40.02	40.74	40.74	681		5080	21
22	A	Claudia Salman-Rath	Germany	40.36	37.76	40.70	40.70	681	SB	5359	10
23	A	Tamara de Sousa	Brazil	39.86	40.65	36.11	40.65	680		4988	23
24	A	Alysbeth Felix	Puerto Rico	x	39.56	38.82	39.56	659	SB	4742	26
25	A	Vanessa Chefer	Brazil	38.04	39.36	x	39.36	655		4500	29
26	A	Lecabela Quaresma	Portugal	35.79	36.71	x	36.71	604		4882	24
27	A	Hanne Maudens	Belgium	35.44	35.41	33.98	35.44	580		4826	25
28	A	Erica Bougard	United States	x	33.76	x	33.76	548		5053	22
–	B	Nadine Broersen	Netherlands				DNS	0		DNF	–
–	B	Evelis Aguilar	Colombia				DNS	0		DNF	–

=== 800 metres ===
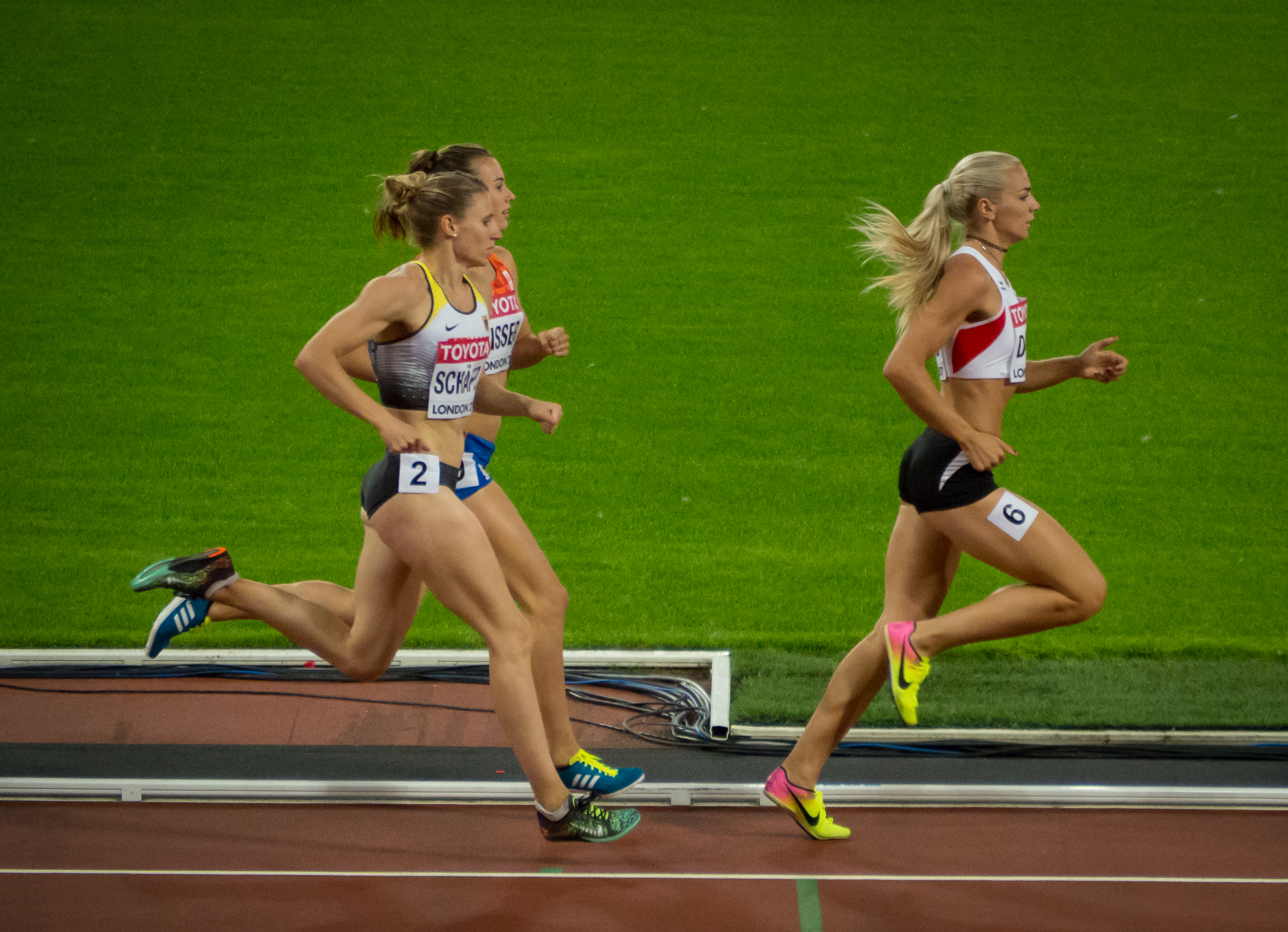
Ivona Dadic, Carolin Schäfer, Nadine Visser on 800 meters discipline

The 800 metres took place on 6 August in three heats as follows:

Heat	1	2	3
Start time	20:41	20:51	21:02
Photo finish	link	link	link

The overall results were as follows:

Rank	Heat	Athlete	Nationality	Result	Points	Notes	Overall	
Rank	Heat	Athlete	Nationality	Result	Points	Notes	Pts	Rank
1	2	Xénia Krizsán	Hungary	2:07.17	1006	PB	6356	9
2	3	Claudia Salman-Rath	Germany	2:07.37	1003		6362	8
3	3	Katarina Johnson-Thompson	Great Britain & N.I.	2:08.10	993	SB	6558	5
4	1	Erica Bougard	United States	2:08.77	983		6036	18
5	3	Yorgelis Rodríguez	Cuba	2:10.48	958	PB	6594	4
6	1	Sharon Day-Monroe	United States	2:12.64	926	SB	6006	20
7	1	Hanne Maudens	Belgium	2:12.87	923		5749	23
8	3	Eliška Klučinová	Czech Republic	2:13.00	921	SB	6313	10
9	1	Györgyi Zsivoczky-Farkas	Hungary	2:13.44	915	SB	6050	17
10	3	Ivona Dadic	Austria	2:13.44	915	SB	6417	6
11	1	Lecabela Quaresma	Portugal	2:14.06	906		5788	22
12	3	Nadine Visser	Netherlands	2:14.74	896	PB	6370	7
13	2	Géraldine Ruckstuhl	Switzerland	2:14.85	895		6230	11
14	3	Carolin Schäfer	Germany	2:15.34	888		6696	2
15	2	Kateřina Cachová	Czech Republic	2:15.58	885		6070	15
16	2	Alina Shukh	Ukraine	2:15.84	881		6075	14
17	2	Caroline Agnou	Switzerland	2:18.57	843		6001	21
18	1	Alysbeth Felix	Puerto Rico	2:18.68	842	SB	5584	25
19	2	Grit Šadeiko	Estonia	2:18.88	839		6094	13
20	3	Kendell Williams	United States	2:19.15	835		6220	12
21	3	Anouk Vetter	Netherlands	2:19.43	831	SB	6636	3
22	1	Swapna Barman	India	2:20.17	821		5431	26
23	2	Antoinette Nana Djimou	France	2:21.14	808	SB	6064	16
24	3	Nafissatou Thiam	Belgium	2:21.42	804		6784	1
25	2	Odile Ahouanwanou	Benin	2:27.00	731		6020	19
26	1	Tamara de Sousa	Brazil	2:34.03	643		5631	24
	1	Vanessa Chefer	Brazil	DNF	0		4500	29
	2	Verena Preiner	Austria	DNS	0		DNF	

=== Final standings ===
The final standing were as follows.

The best score for each event is highlighted.

Rank	Athlete	Nationality	100mh	HJ	SP	200m	LJ	JT	800m	Total	Notes
1st place, gold medalist(s)	Nafissatou Thiam	Belgium	1044	1171	872	927	1030	936	804	6784	
2nd place, silver medalist(s)	Carolin Schäfer	Germany	1111	1054	850	1021	912	860	888	6696	
3rd place, bronze medalist(s)	Anouk Vetter	Netherlands	1078	941	867	946	949	1024	831	6636	NR
4	Yorgelis Rodríguez	Cuba	1036	1171	757	941	921	810	958	6594	NR
5	Katarina Johnson-Thompson	Great Britain & N.I.	1075	978	692	1093	1027	700	993	6558	
6	Ivona Dadic	Austria	1024	978	782	970	843	905	915	6417	NR
7	Nadine Visser	Netherlands	1147	941	725	1007	943	711	896	6370	SB
8	Claudia Salman-Rath	Germany	1047	903	717	988	1023	681	1003	6362	
9	Xénia Krizsán	Hungary	1021	941	803	873	828	884	1006	6356	
10	Eliška Klučinová	Czech Republic	974	1054	848	913	899	704	921	6313	SB
11	Géraldine Ruckstuhl	Switzerland	1007	978	751	902	795	902	895	6230	
12	Kendell Williams	United States	1121	903	709	953	908	791	835	6220	
13	Grit Šadeiko	Estonia	1069	903	698	924	850	811	839	6094	
14	Alina Shukh	Ukraine	934	1016	777	746	804	917	881	6075	
15	Kateřina Cachová	Czech Republic	1069	903	651	928	896	738	885	6070	
16	Antoinette Nana Djimou	France	1056	867	835	871	865	762	808	6064	
17	Györgyi Zsivoczky-Farkas	Hungary	971	941	777	852	831	763	915	6050	SB
18	Erica Bougard	United States	1089	903	622	1014	877	548	983	6036	
19	Odile Ahouanwanou	Benin	1020	903	841	972	825	728	731	6020	
20	Sharon Day-Monroe	United States	1004	903	870	890	732	681	926	6006	
21	Caroline Agnou	Switzerland	985	830	770	920	918	735	843	6001	
22	Lecabela Quaresma	Portugal	987	867	759	852	813	604	906	5788	
23	Hanne Maudens	Belgium	913	941	648	848	896	580	923	5749	
24	Tamara de Sousa	Brazil	956	903	773	920	756	680	643	5631	
25	Alysbeth Felix	Puerto Rico	974	867	583	852	807	659	842	5584	SB
26	Swapna Barman	India	959	867	583	758	709	734	821	5431	
29	Vanessa Chefer	Brazil	850	830	669	873	623	655	0	4500	
	Verena Preiner	Austria	1008	867	738	939	843	769	0	DNF	
	Nadine Broersen	Netherlands	1008	1016	800	889	834	0		DNF	
	Evelis Aguilar	Colombia	974	830	753	947	0	0		DNF	
	Laura Ikauniece-Admidina	Latvia	1020	0	0					DNF	
