= Hungary at the 2017 World Championships in Athletics =

- WA code: HUN
- National federation: Magyar Atlétikai Szövetség
- Website: www.masz.hu

in London
- Competitors: 16 in 12 events
- Medals Ranked =28th: Gold 0 Silver 1 Bronze 1 Total 2

World Championships in Athletics appearances
- 1976; 1980; 1983; 1987; 1991; 1993; 1995; 1997; 1999; 2001; 2003; 2005; 2007; 2009; 2011; 2013; 2015; 2017; 2019; 2022; 2023; 2025

Hungary competed at the 2017 World Championships in Athletics in London, United Kingdom, from 4–13 August 2017.

== Medalists ==
| Medal | Name | Event | Date |
|---|---|---|---|
| Silver | Anita Márton | Shot put | August 9 |
| Bronze | Balázs Baji | 110 metres hurdles | August 7 |

== Results ==
=== Men ===
Track and road events

| Athlete | Event | Heat | | Semifinal | | Final | |
| Athlete | Event | Result | Rank | Result | Rank | Result | Rank |
|---|---|---|---|---|---|---|---|
| Balázs Baji | 110 metres hurdles | 13.35 | 6 Q | 13.23 | 5 Q | 13.28 | 3rd place, bronze medalist(s) |
| Máté Helebrandt | 50 kilometres walk | —N/a | | | | 3:43:56 NR | 6 |

Field events

| Athlete | Event | Qualification | | Final | |
| Athlete | Event | Distance | Position | Distance | Position |
|---|---|---|---|---|---|
| Zoltán Kővágó | Discus throw | 59.46 | 22 | Did not advance | |
| Bence Halász | Hammer throw | 75.56 | 5 Q | 74.45 | 11 |
| Krisztián Pars | Hammer throw | 74.08 | 14 | Did not advance | |
| Norbert Rivasz-Tóth | Javelin throw | 78.76 | 21 | Did not advance | |

=== Women ===
Track and road events

| Athlete | Event | Heat | | Semifinal | | Final | |
| Athlete | Event | Result | Rank | Result | Rank | Result | Rank |
|---|---|---|---|---|---|---|---|
| Gréta Kerekes | 100 metres hurdles | 13.15 | 26 | Did not advance | | | |
| Luca Kozák | 100 metres hurdles | 13.17 | 28 | Did not advance | | | |
| Viktória Gyürkés | 3000 metres steeplechase | 9:52.66 | 27 | —N/a | | Did not advance | |
| Barbara Kovács | 20 kilometres walk | —N/a | | | | 1:32:44 | 27 |
| Viktória Madarász | 20 kilometres walk | —N/a | | | | 1:30:05 NR | 12 |
| Rita Récsei | 20 kilometres walk | —N/a | | | | 1:40:56 | 51 |

Field events

| Athlete | Event | Qualification | | Final | |
| Athlete | Event | Distance | Position | Distance | Position |
|---|---|---|---|---|---|
| Réka Gyurátz | Hammer throw | 67.48 | 16 | Did not advance | |
| Anita Márton | Shot put | 18.76 | 3 Q | 19.49 | 2nd place, silver medalist(s) |
| Anita Márton | Discus throw | 55.96 | 24 | Did not advance | |

Combined events – Heptathlon

| Athlete | Event | 100H | HJ | SP | 200 m | LJ | JT | 800 m | Final | Rank |
|---|---|---|---|---|---|---|---|---|---|---|
| Xénia Krizsán | Result | 13.70 | 1.77 | 14.14 | 25.15 | 5.93 | 51.25 PB | 2:07.17 PB | 6356 | 9 |
| Xénia Krizsán | Points | 1021 | 941 | 803 | 873 | 828 | 884 | 1006 | 6356 | 9 |
| Györgyi Zsivoczky-Farkas | Result | 14.05 | 1.77 | 13.75 | 25.38 | 5.94 | 44.95 | 2:13.44 SB | 6050 | 17 |
| Györgyi Zsivoczky-Farkas | Points | 971 | 941 | 777 | 852 | 831 | 763 | 915 | 6050 | 17 |

Key

- Q = Qualified for the next round
- q = Qualified for the next round as a fastest loser or, in field events, by position without achieving the qualifying target
- NR = National record
- PB = Personal best
- SB = Season best
- NM = No mark
- N/A = Round not applicable for the event

== Sources ==
- "Atlétikai vb: tizenhat magyar versenyző indul Londonban" (in Hungarian). 2017-07-30.
- "Tizenhat magyar atléta a Világbajnokságon" (PDF) (in Hungarian). 2017-07-30.
