= 2017 World Championships in Athletics – Women's pole vault =

Women's pole vault at the 2017 World Championships
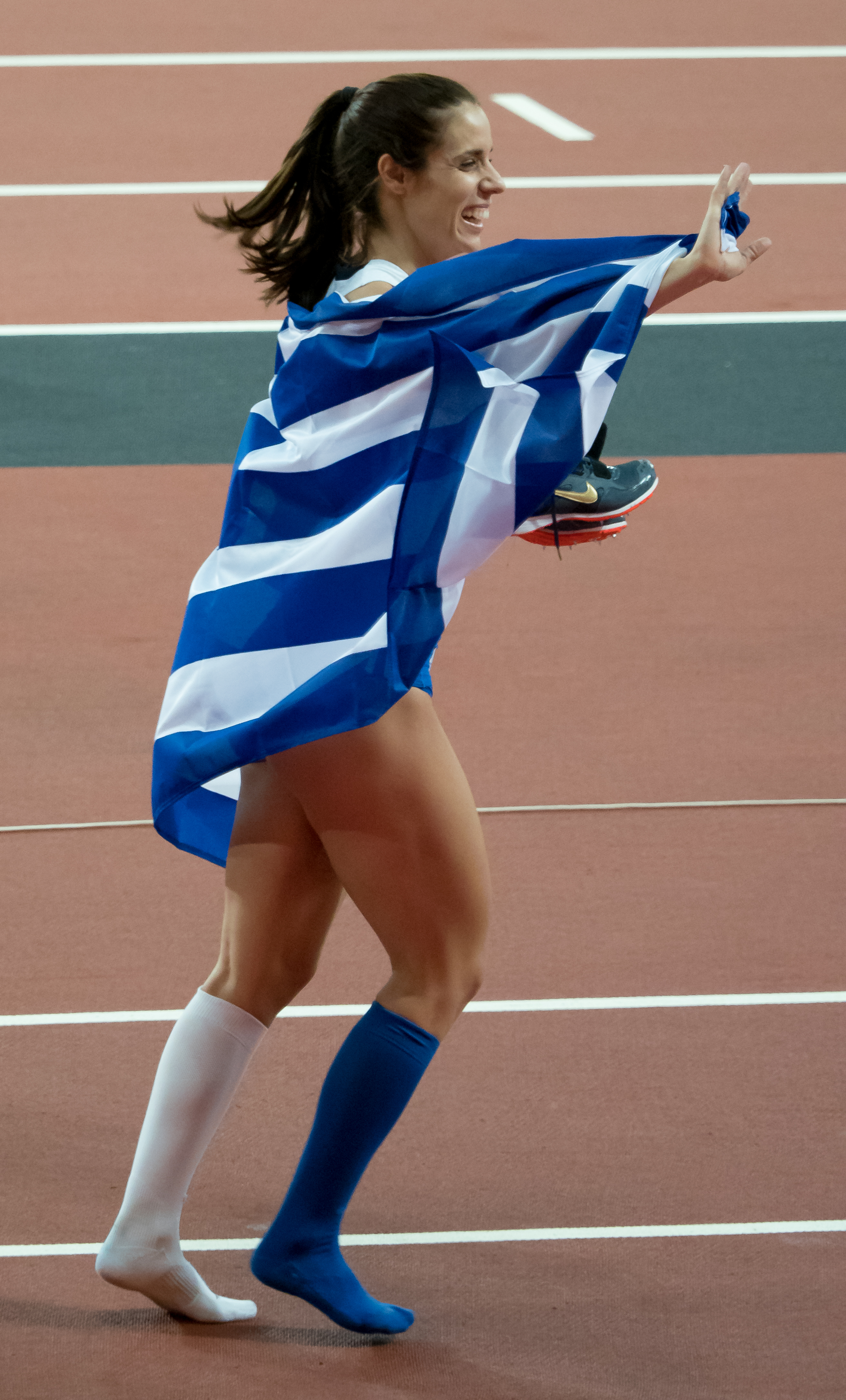
- Katerina Stefanidi, the winner of the event.
- Venue: Olympic Stadium
- Dates: 4 August (qualification); 6 August (final)
- Competitors: 31 from 19 nations
- Winning height: 4.91 m (16 ft 1 1/4 in) WL NR

Medalists
gold medal	Katerina Stefanidi	Greece
silver medal	Sandi Morris	United States
bronze medal	Robeilys Peinado	Venezuela
bronze medal	Yarisley Silva	Cuba

Video on YouTube Official Video

The women's pole vault at the 2017 World Championships in Athletics was held at the Olympic Stadium on 4 and 6 August.

== Summary ==
It essentially took a clearance at 4.50 metres to make it into the final. The one clearance (with earlier misses) brought 13 still in at 4.55 metres each thinking there was more work to do. Lisa Ryzih, Sandi Morris and Robeilys Peinado remained perfect at 4.55 metres, with Olympic Champion Katerina Stefanidi passing all the way until the automatic qualifier height of 4.60 metres.

In the final, four women were perfect to 4.55 metres including home team favourite, Holly Bradshaw, Yarisley Silva, Peinado and Morris with Stefanidi again still passing. At Stefanidi's starting height 4.65 meters, she cleared on her first attempt and was only matched with a perfect round by Morris. Ryzih, Peinado and Silva all missed once before clearing. Ryzih's earlier miss at 4.45 metres dropping out of the tie that defined the tied bronze medalists as none of them could go any higher. So it was a repeat battle from the Olympics. Morris and Stefanidi still perfect over 4.75 metres. At 4.82 metres, Morris missed but Stefanidi made it. Morris passed to try 4.89 metres for the win, but she couldn't make it. Neither did Stefanidi, but she really didn't need to. After Morris missed her last attempt, Stefanidi passed to 4.91 metres, which she made on her first attempt for a national record, stamping an exclamation point on her win. Stefanidi then moved the bar up to 5.02 metres try to join Morris and become the fourth woman over 5 metres and set a new championship record, but she missed all three attempts.

== Records ==
Before the competition records were as follows:

Record	Perf.	Athlete	Nat.	Date	Location
World	5.06	Yelena Isinbayeva	RUS	28 Aug 2009	Zürich, Switzerland
Championship	5.01	Yelena Isinbayeva	RUS	12 Aug 2005	Helsinki, Finland
World leading	4.85	Katerina Stefanidi	GRE	8 Jun 2017	Rome, Italy
African	4.42	Elmarie Gerryts	RSA	12 Jun 2000	Wesel, Germany
Asian	4.66	Li Ling	CHN	6 Jun 2015	Wuhan, China
NACAC	5.02 i	Jennifer Suhr	USA	2 Mar 2013	Albuquerque, United States
South American	4.87	Fabiana Murer	BRA	3 Jul 2016	São Bernardo do Campo, Brazil
European	5.06	Yelena Isinbayeva	RUS	28 Aug 2009	Zürich, Switzerland
Oceanian	4.82	Eliza McCartney	NZL	26 Feb 2017	Auckland, New Zealand

The following records were set at the competition:

Record	Perf.	Athlete	Nat.	Date
Greek	4.91	Katerina Stefanidi	GRE	6 Aug 2017
Venezuelan	4.65	Robeilys Peinado	VEN	6 Aug 2017

== Qualification standard ==
The standard to qualify automatically for entry was 4.55 metres.

== Schedule ==
The event schedule, in local time (UTC+1), was as follows:

Date	Time	Round
4 August	19:45	Qualification
6 August	19:00	Final

== Results ==
=== Qualification ===
The qualification round took place on 4 August, in two groups, with Group A starting at 19:50 and Group B starting at 19:49. Athletes attaining a mark of 4.60 metres ( Q ) or at least the 12 best performers ( q ) qualified for the final. The overall results were as follows:

Rank	Group	Name	Nationality	4.20	4.35	4.50	4.55	4.60	Mark	Notes
1	B	Katerina Stefanidi	Greece	-	-	-	-	o	4.60	Q
2	B	Lisa Ryzih	Germany	-	-	o	o		4.55	q
2	A	Sandi Morris	United States	-	o	o	o		4.55	q
2	A	Robeilys Peinado	Venezuela	o	o	o	o		4.55	q
5	A	Alysha Newman	Canada	-	o	xxo	o		4.55	q
6	B	Yarisley Silva	Cuba	-	-	o	xo		4.55	q
7	B	Nicole Büchler	Switzerland	-	-	xxo	xo		4.55	q
8	B	Angelica Bengtsson	Sweden	o	o	o	xxo		4.55	q
8	B	Olga Mullina	Authorised Neutral Athletes (ANA)	o	o	o	xo		4.55	q
10	B	Anicka Newell	Canada	-	o	o	xxx		4.50	q
10	A	Holly Bradshaw	Great Britain & N.I.	-	-	o	-		4.50	q
12	A	Eliza McCartney	New Zealand	-	xo	xo	xxx		4.50	q
13	A	Angelica Moser	Switzerland	o	xo	xxo	xxx		4.50	
14	A	Silke Spiegelburg	Germany	o	o	xxx			4.35	
15	A	Liz Parnov	Australia	xo	o	xxx			4.35	
15	B	Tina Šutej	Slovenia	xo	o	xxx			4.35	
17	A	Lisa Gunnarsson	Sweden	xxo	o	xxx			4.35	
18	A	Romana Maláčová	Czech Republic	o	xo	xxx			4.35	
18	B	Jirina Ptacnikova	Czech Republic	o	xo	xxx			4.35	
20	B	Ninon Guillon-Romarin	France	o	xxx				4.20	
20	B	Friedelinde Petershofen	Germany	o	xxx				4.20	
20	A	Fanny Smets	Belgium	o	xxx				4.20	
20	A	Minna Nikkanen	Finland	o	xxx				4.20	
24	B	Maryna Kylypko	Ukraine	xo	xxx				4.20	
	B	Jennifer Suhr	United States	-	-	-	xxx		NH	
	B	Amálie Švábíková	Czech Republic	xxx					NH	
	B	Emily Grove	United States	xxx					NH	
	A	Kelsie Ahbe	Canada	xxx					NH	
	A	Iryna Zhuk	Belarus	xxx					NH	
	A	Anzhelika Sidorova	Authorised Neutral Athletes (ANA)	-	-	xxx			NH	
	A	Michaela Meijer	Sweden	-	xxx				NH	

=== Final ===
The final took place on 6 August at 19:01. The results were as follows:

Rank	Name	Nationality	4.30	4.45	4.55	4.65	4.75	4.82	4.89	4.91	5.02	Mark	Notes
1st place, gold medalist(s)	Katerina Stefanidi	Greece	–	–	–	o	o	o	x-	o	xxx	4.91	WL NR
2nd place, silver medalist(s)	Sandi Morris	United States	–	o	o	o	o	x-	xx			4.75	
3rd place, bronze medalist(s)	Robeilys Peinado	Venezuela	o	o	o	xo	xxx					4.65	=NR
3rd place, bronze medalist(s)	Yarisley Silva	Cuba	–	o	o	xo	xxx					4.65	
5	Lisa Ryzih	Germany	–	xo	o	xo	xxx					4.65	
6	Holly Bradshaw	Great Britain & N.I.	–	–	o	xxo	xxx					4.65	
7	Alysha Newman	Canada	xo	o	o	xxo	xxx					4.65	
8	Olga Mullina	Authorised Neutral Athletes (ANA)	xo	o	o	xxx						4.55	
9	Eliza McCartney	New Zealand	–	o	xo	xxx						4.55	
10	Angelica Bengtsson	Sweden	xo	o	xo	xxx						4.55	
11	Nicole Büchler	Switzerland	–	o	xxx							4.45	
12	Anicka Newell	Canada	xo	xo	xxx							4.45	
