= 2017 World Championships in Athletics – Women's 10,000 metres =

Women's 10,000 metres at the 2017 World Championships
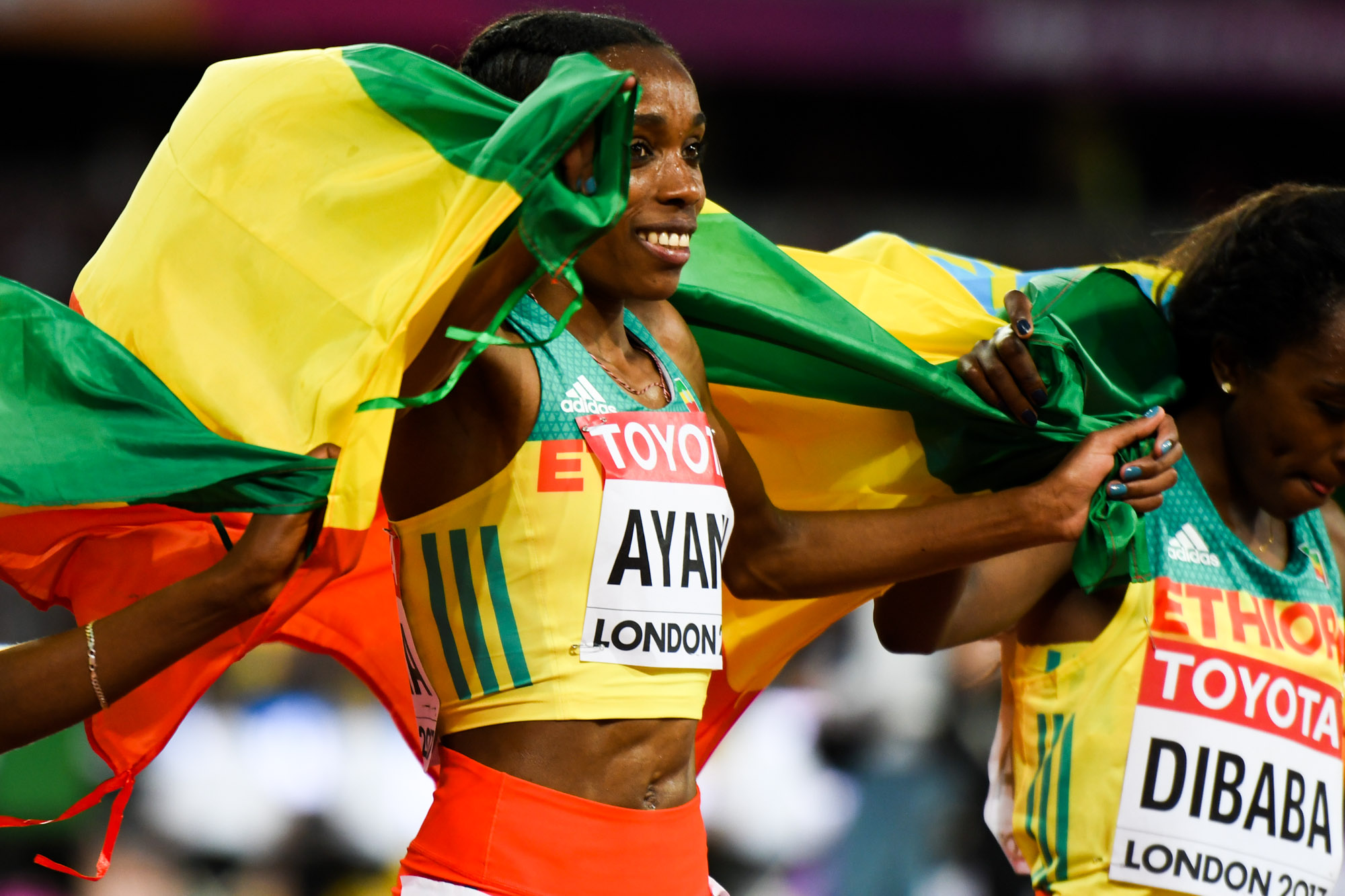
- Almaz Ayana and Tirunesh Dibaba shortly after the final.
- Venue: Olympic Stadium
- Dates: 5 August
- Competitors: 33 from 20 nations
- Winning time: 30:16.32

Medalists
gold medal	Almaz Ayana	Ethiopia
silver medal	Tirunesh Dibaba	Ethiopia
bronze medal	Agnes Jebet Tirop	Kenya

Video on YouTube Official Video

The women's 10,000 metres at the 2017 World Championships in Athletics was held at the London Stadium on 5 August. The winning margin was a huge 46.37 seconds. As of 2024, this is the only time the women's 10,000 metres has been won by more than 30 seconds at these championships.

== Summary ==
2015 champion Vivian Cheruiyot from Kenya was absent, having retired from track races. Three-time world champion Tirunesh Dibaba from Ethiopia ran, although she had planned initially to run the marathon instead. Almaz Ayana, also from Ethiopia and the world record holder from the 2016 Summer Olympics, ran her first race of the year.

The race began at a leisurely pace, with Ayana hovering near the front, just behind a succession of leaders. After 4000 metres in just over 13 minutes, Ayana led by 0.24 seconds. She then broke open the race with a 2:49.18 1000 metres, which was her quickest of the race, and extended her lead to 5.96 seconds at the halfway mark, with Yasemin Can from Turkey in second place. Her lead at 6000 metres grew to 16.84 seconds. Her 46:37 second margin of victory was the largest ever in a women's 10,000 metres at the World Championships. Her final 5000 meters was run in 14:24.94, which only seven women had bettered in a 5000 metres race.

The race for the silver medal was competitive among Dibaba, Alice Aprot Nawowuna, and Agnes Jebet Tirop. Dibaba, however, ran a fast 2:49.98 last 1000 metres, averaging 68 seconds per 400 metres, to clinch the silver.

== Records ==
Before the competition, the records were as follows:

Record	Perf.	Athlete	Nat.	Date	Location
World	29:17.45	Almaz Ayana	ETH	12 Aug 2016	Rio de Janeiro, Brazil
World Championships	30:04.18	Berhane Adere	ETH	23 Aug 2003	Paris, France
World leading in 2017	30:40.87	Gelete Burka	ETH	10 Jun 2017	Hengelo, Netherlands
African	29:17.45	Almaz Ayana	ETH	12 Aug 2016	Rio de Janeiro, Brazil
Asian	29:31.78	Junxia Wang	CHN	8 Sep 1993	Beijing, China
North, Central American and Caribbean	30:13.17	Molly Huddle	USA	12 Aug 2016	Rio de Janeiro, Brazil
South American	31:47.76	Carmem de Oliveira	BRA	21 Aug 1993	Stuttgart, Germany
European	29:56.34	Elvan Abeylegesse	TUR	15 Aug 2008	Beijing, China
Oceanian	30:35.54	Kim Smith	NZL	4 May 2008	Palo Alto, United States

The following records were set in the race:

Record	Time	Athlete	Nationality
World leading in 2017	30:16.32	Almaz Ayana	ETH
Uzbekistan	31:57.42	Sitora Hamidova	UZB
Paraguay	33:18.22	Carmen Martínez	PAR

== Qualification standard ==
The standard to qualify automatically for entry was 32:15.00.

== Results ==
The final took place on 5 August. The results were as follows(photo finish):

Rank	Name	Nationality	Time	Notes
1st place, gold medalist(s)	Almaz Ayana	Ethiopia	30:16.32	WL
2nd place, silver medalist(s)	Tirunesh Dibaba	Ethiopia	31:02.69	SB
3rd place, bronze medalist(s)	Agnes Jebet Tirop	Kenya	31:03.50	PB
4	Alice Aprot Nawowuna	Kenya	31:11.86	SB
5	Susan Krumins	Netherlands	31:20.24	PB
6	Emily Infeld	United States	31:20.45	PB
7	Irene Chepet Cheptai	Kenya	31:21.11	SB
8	Molly Huddle	United States	31:24.78	
9	Emily Sisson	United States	31:26.36	
10	Ayuko Suzuki	Japan	31:27.30	SB
11	Yasemin Can	Turkey	31:35.48	
12	Shitaye Eshete	Bahrain	31:38.66	SB
13	Mercyline Chelangat	Uganda	31:40.48	NR
14	Dera Dida	Ethiopia	31:51.75	
15	Desi Mokonin	Bahrain	31:55.34	
16	Natasha Wodak	Canada	31:55.47	SB
17	Darya Maslova	Kyrgyzstan	31:57.23	SB
18	Sitora Hamidova	Uzbekistan	31:57.42	NR
19	Mizuki Matsuda	Japan	31:59.54	
20	Rachel Cliff	Canada	32:00.03	PB
21	Beth Potter	Great Britain & N.I.	32:15.88	
22	Eloise Wellings	Australia	32:26.31	SB
23	Failuna Abdi Matanga	Tanzania	32:29.97	
24	Miyuki Uehara	Japan	32:31.58	
25	Salome Nyirarukundo	Rwanda	32:45.95	SB
26	Madeline Hills	Australia	32:48.57	
27	Charlotte Taylor	Great Britain & N.I.	32:51.33	
28	Carla Salomé Rocha	Portugal	32:52.71	
29	Margarita Hernández	Mexico	33:06.53	
30	Camille Buscomb	New Zealand	33:07.53	
31	Carmen Martínez	Paraguay	33:18.22	NR
	Sarah Lahti	Sweden	DNF	
	Jess Martin	Great Britain & N.I.	DNF	

=== Split times ===
The split times of the top four finishers were as follows:

Distance	Almaz Ayana			Tirunesh Dibaba			Agnes Jebet Tirop			Alice Aprot Nawowuna		
Distance	Pos	Split	Total	Pos	Split	Total	Pos	Split	Total	Pos	Split	Total
1000 m	6	3:30.38	3:30.38	20	3:31.43	3:31.43	10	3:30.64	3:30.64	4	3:30.33	3:30.33
2000 m	2	3:18.49	6:48.87	17	3:18.88	6:50.31	9	3:19.09	6:49.73	4	3:18.87	6:49.19
3000 m	2	3:10.60	9:59.47	3	3:09.37	9:59.68	10	3:10.46	10:00.19	4	3:10.59	9:59.78
4000 m	1	3:02.73	13:02.20	6	3:04.66	13:04.34	3	3:03.02	13:03.21	4	3:03.67	13:03.45
5000 m	1	2:49.18	15:51.38	6	2:56.30	16:00.64	5	2:57.03	16:00.24	3	2:55.45	15:59.79
6000 m	1	2:51.59	18:42.97	6	2:59.86	19:00.50	4	2:59.82	19:00.06	2	3:00.02	18:59.81
7000 m	1	2:52.22	21:35.19	4	3:02.10	22:02.60	3	3:02.30	22:02.36	2	3:02.35	22:02.16
8000 m	1	2:54.84	24:30.03	5	3:05.70	25:08.30	3	3:05.62	25:07.98	2	3:05.57	25:07.73
9000 m	1	2:56.80	27:26.83	4	3:04.41	28:12.71	2	3:04.20	28:12.18	3	3:04.70	28:12.43
10,000 m	1	2:49.49	30:16.32	2	2:49.98	31:02.69	3	2:51.32	31:03.50	4	2:59.43	31:11.86
