= Friedelinde Petershofen =

German pole vaulter

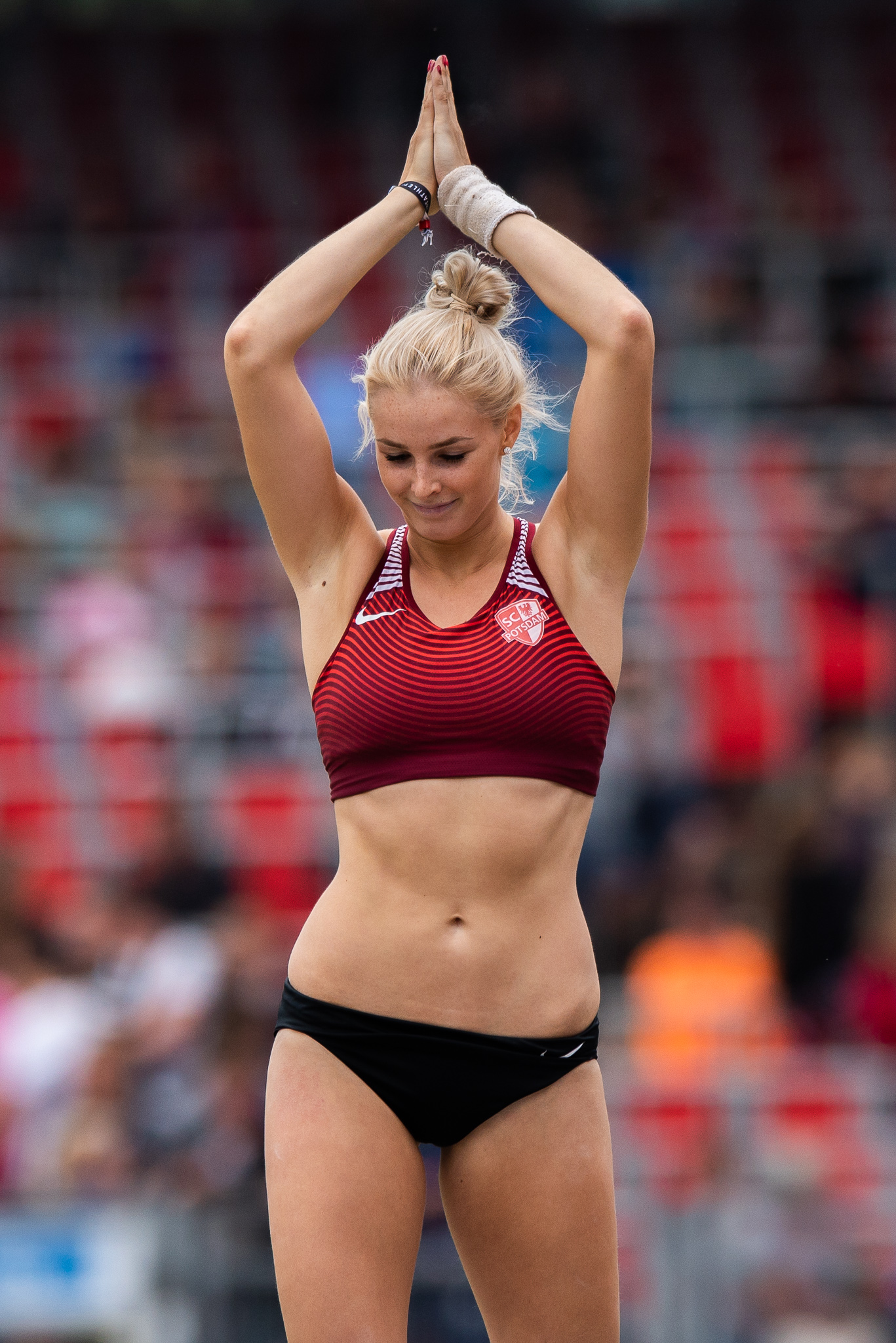
- Friedelinde Petershofen (2018)

Personal information
- Nationality: German
- Born: 19 August 1995 (age 30)

Sport
- Sport: Athletics
- Event: Pole vault

Friedelinde Petershofen (born 19 August 1995) is a German pole vaulter. She competed in the women's pole vault at the 2017 World Championships in Athletics.
