= Petr Frydrych =

Czech javelin thrower

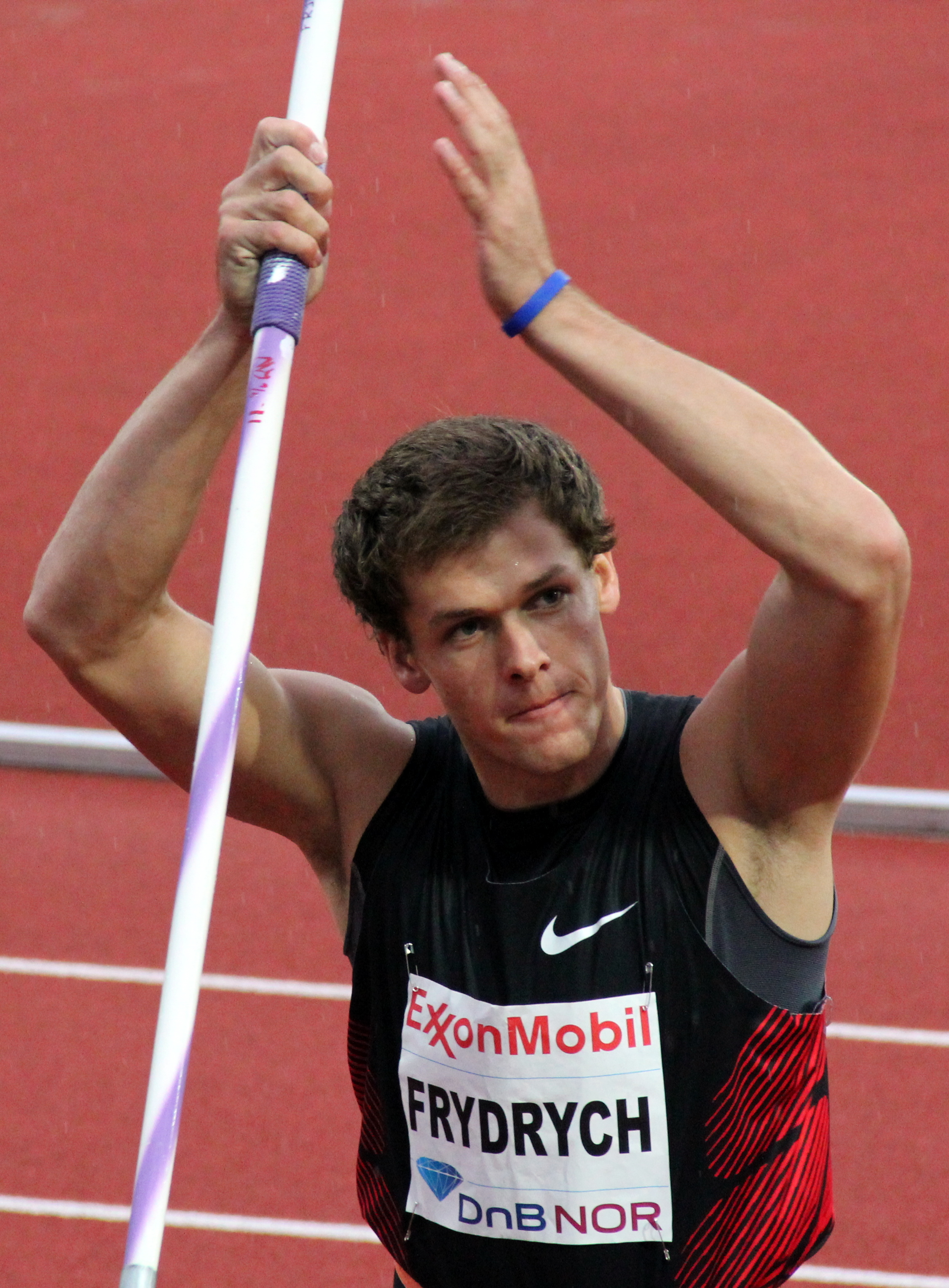
- Petr Frydrych at the 2011 Bislett Games

Personal information
- Born: 13 January 1988 (age 38) Klatovy, Czechoslovakia
- Height: 1.99 m (6 ft 6 in)
- Weight: 100 kg (220 lb)

Sport
- Country: Czech Republic
- Sport: Athletics
- Event: Javelin throw
- Coached by: Jan Železný

Achievements and titles
- Personal best: 88.32 m (2017)
Medal record
World Championships
Bronze medal – third place	2017 London	Javelin throw

Petr Frydrych (Czech pronunciation: [ˈpɛtr̩ ˈfrɪdrɪx]; born 13 January 1988) is a Czech track and field athlete who competes in the javelin throw. His personal best of 88.32 m was set at the 2017 World Championships, where he won the bronze medal. He is coached by world record holder and three-time Olympic Champion Jan Železný.

== Early career ==
Frydrych competed in the 2005 World Youth Championships, 2006 World Junior Championships and 2007 European Junior Championships, without much success.

In 2009 Frydrych, by then under Železný's guidance, exploded to the international elite. He improved his personal best from 75.55 to 84.96 and placed second in the European U23 Championships in Kaunas, Lithuania, passed in the last round by Finland's Ari Mannio. He qualified for the final at the World Championships in Berlin, finishing 10th with a 79.29 effort.

The 2010 season started well for Frydrych, who first improved to 85.60 at the May 23 Shanghai Golden Grand Prix, losing to Norway's two-time Olympic Champion Andreas Thorkildsen by only half a metre. Only four days later, he threw a world-leading 88.23 metres at the Golden Spike meet in Ostrava. In javelin's first appearance in the inaugural IAAF Diamond Race, at Oslo on June 4, Frydrych again placed a narrow second to Thorkildsen, this time with a mark of 85.33.

Frydrych was second to Thorkildsen once more at the Adidas Grand Prix in New York City, but a back injury spoiled the rest of 2010 for him, and he only placed 10th at the European Championships.

Frydrych won the 2011 Diamond League opener in Doha, Qatar with a mark of 85.32, almost a metre ahead of Robert Oosthuizen.

== Seasonal bests by year ==
- 2006 – 70.91
- 2007 – 75.55
- 2008 – 74.13
- 2009 – 84.96
- 2010 – 88.23
- 2011 – 85.32
- 2012 – 81.14
- 2013 – 82.39
- 2014 – 85.07
- 2015 – 85.52
- 2016 – 84.10
- 2017 – 88.32
