= Colombia at the World Athletics Championships =

- WA code: COL
- National federation: Colombian Athletics Federation
- Website: www.fecodatle.com
- Medals Ranked 42nd: Gold 4 Silver 3 Bronze 3 Total 10

World Athletics Championships appearances (overview)
- 1983; 1987; 1991; 1993; 1995; 1997; 1999; 2001; 2003; 2005; 2007; 2009; 2011; 2013; 2015; 2017; 2019; 2022; 2023; 2025

Colombia has won a total of 10 medals at the World Athletics Championships. Race walker Luis Fernando López won the country's first medal at the championships, a bronze that eventually turned into gold due to the disqualification for doping of the athletes who ranked first and second at the men's 20 kilometres race walk event at the 2011 Championships in Daegu, South Korea. Caterine Ibargüen is the most successful Colombian athlete at the championships, with 5 medals in total.

== History ==
Before the medals won in 2011, sprinter Ximena Restrepo had the most outstanding presentation made by a Colombian athlete at the World Championships. She ranked sixth at the women's 400m event at the 1991 edition in Tokio. Also, Luis Fernando López ranked fourth at the men's 20 km walk event during the Berlin 2009 Championships.

== Medal Count ==
=== By championships ===
Championships	Athletes	Gold	Silver	Bronze	Total	Rank
(Finland) 1983 Helsinki	–	0	0	0	0	–
(Italy) 1987 Rome	–	0	0	0	0	–
(Japan) 1991 Tokyo	–	0	0	0	0	–
(Germany) 1993 Stuttgart	–	0	0	0	0	–
(Sweden) 1995 Gothenburg	–	0	0	0	0	–
(Greece) 1997 Athens	–	0	0	0	0	–
(Spain) 1999 Seville	–	0	0	0	0	–
(Canada) 2001 Edmonton	–	0	0	0	0	–
(France) 2003 Paris	–	0	0	0	0	–
(Finland) 2005 Helsinki	–	0	0	0	0	–
(Japan) 2007 Osaka	7	0	0	0	0	–
(Germany) 2009 Berlin	11	0	0	0	0	–
(South Korea) 2011 Daegu	20	1	0	1	2	11
(Russia) 2013 Moscow	20	1	0	0	1	13
(China) 2015 Beijing	12	1	0	0	1	15
(United Kingdom) 2017 London	20	1	1	0	2	11
(Qatar) 2019 Doha	15	0	1	1	2	24
(United States) 2022 Oregon	7	0	0	0	0	–
(Hungary) 2023 Budapest	15	0	1	0	1	27
(Japan) 2025 Tokyo	18	0	0	1	1	41
(China) 2027 Beijing	To be determined					
(Kenya) 2029 Nairobi	To be determined					
(Germany) 2031 Munich	To be determined					
Total		4	3	3	10	42

=== By event ===
Event	Gold	Silver	Bronze	Total
Triple jump	2	1	2	5
20 km walk	2	0	0	2
400 m	0	1	0	1
Javelin throw	0	1	0	1
Long jump	0	0	1	1
Totals (5 entries)	4	3	3	10

=== By gender ===
Gender	Gold	Silver	Bronze	Total
Women	2	2	3	7
Men	2	1	0	3

== List of Medalists ==
Medal	Name	Championships	Event
Gold	Luis Fernando López	(South Korea) 2011 Daegu	Men's 20 kilometres walk
Bronze	Caterine Ibargüen	(South Korea) 2011 Daegu	Women's triple jump
Gold	Caterine Ibargüen	(Russia) 2013 Moscow	Women's triple jump
Gold	Caterine Ibargüen	(China) 2015 Beijing	Women's triple jump
Gold	Éider Arévalo	(United Kingdom) 2017 London	Men's 20 kilometres walk
Silver	Caterine Ibargüen	(United Kingdom) 2017 London	Women's triple jump
Silver	Anthony Zambrano	(Qatar) 2019 Doha	Men's 400 metres
Bronze	Caterine Ibargüen	(Qatar) 2019 Doha	Women's triple jump
Silver	Flor Ruiz	(Hungary) 2023 Budapest	Women's javelin throw
Bronze	Natalia Linares	(Japan) 2025 Tokyo	Women's long jump

== Multiple medalists ==
Athlete	Gold	Silver	Bronze	Total	Years
Caterine Ibargüen	2	1	2	5	2011–2019
