= Colombia at the 2022 World Athletics Championships =

- Flag of Colombia
- WA code: COL
- National federation: Colombian Athletics Federation
- Website: www.fecodatle.com (in Spanish)

in Eugene, United States 15 July 2022 – 24 July 2022
- Competitors: 14 (11 men and 3 women) in 8 events
- Medals: Gold 0 Silver 0 Bronze 0 Total 0

World Athletics Championships appearances (overview)
- 1983; 1987; 1991; 1993; 1995; 1997; 1999; 2001; 2003; 2005; 2007; 2009; 2011; 2013; 2015; 2017; 2019; 2022; 2023; 2025

Colombia competed at the 2022 World Athletics Championships in Eugene, United States, from 15 to 24 July 2022. The Colombian Athletics Federation had initially entered 14 athletes, but ended up competing with 7 of them due to the withdrawals of 7 athletes.

Without having won any medal, Colombia ranked 73rd place in the overall placing table with one point, achieved thanks to Éider Arévalo's eighth place in the men's 35 kilometres race walk. It was the first time since Berlin 2009 that Colombia did not win a medal.

== Team ==
Originally, Colombia entered 14 athletes qualified for the World Athletics Championships; however, the Colombian team was eventually reduced to 7 athletes after the withdrawals of the team for men's 4 × 400 metres relay event (conformed by Gustavo Barrios, Raúl Mena, Jhon Perlaza, Jelssin Robledo, Nicolás Salinas and Jhon Solís) and the javelin thrower Flor Ruiz, all of whom were unable to obtain a visa to enter the United States (except for Raúl Mena).

Other notable absences for Colombia (due to injuries) included the sprinter Anthony Zambrano and the racewalker Sandra Arenas, both silver medalists at Tokyo 2020.

== Results ==
Colombia entered 14 athletes.

Key

- Q = Qualified for the next round
- q = Qualified for the next round as a fastest loser or, in field events, by position without achieving the qualifying target
- NR = National record
- PB = Personal best
- SB = Season best
- N/A = Round not applicable for the event
- Note: Ranks given for track events are within the athlete's heat only

=== Men ===
Track and road events

Athlete	Event	Heat		Semi-final		Final	
Athlete	Event	Result	Rank	Result	Rank	Result	Rank
Carlos San Martín	3000 metres steeplechase	8:48.66	14	—		Did not advance	
Gustavo Barrios; Raúl Mena; Jhon Perlaza; Jelssin Robledo; Nicolás Salinas; Jhon Solís	4 × 400 metres relay	Withdrew from the competition					
Éider Arévalo	20 kilometres walk	—				1:24:32	22
Éider Arévalo	35 kilometres walk	—				2:25:21 NR	8
José Leonardo Montaña	35 kilometres walk	—				DNF	
Diego Pinzón	35 kilometres walk	—				2:34:26 PB	28

* – Indicates the athlete competed in preliminaries but not the final

Field events

Athlete	Event	Qualification		Final	
Athlete	Event	Distance	Position	Distance	Position
Mauricio Ortega	Discus throw	59.91	26	Did not advance	

=== Women ===
Track events

Athlete	Event	Heat		Semi-final		Final	
Athlete	Event	Result	Rank	Result	Rank	Result	Rank
Melissa Gonzalez	400 metres hurdles	56.24	4 Q	55.13	7	Did not advance	

Field events

Athlete	Event	Qualification		Final	
Athlete	Event	Distance	Position	Distance	Position
Jennifer Rodríguez	High jump	1.75	28	Did not advance	
Flor Ruiz	Javelin	Withdrew from the competition			
