= Colombia at the 2025 World Athletics Championships =

- Flag of Colombia
- WA code: COL
- Website: www.fecodatle.com (in Spanish)

in Tokyo, Japan 13 September 2025 – 21 September 2025
- Competitors: 18 (9 men and 9 women)
- Medals Ranked 41st: Gold 0 Silver 0 Bronze 1 Total 1

World Athletics Championships appearances (overview)
- 1983; 1987; 1991; 1993; 1995; 1997; 1999; 2001; 2003; 2005; 2007; 2009; 2011; 2013; 2015; 2017; 2019; 2022; 2023; 2025

Colombia competed at the 2025 World Athletics Championships in Tokyo, Japan, from 13 to 21 September 2025.

== Medalists ==
Medal	Athlete	Event	Date
3rd place, bronze medalist(s)	Natalia Linares	Women's long jump	14 September

== Results ==
Colombia entered 9 male and 9 female athletes to the championships.

Key

- Q = Qualified for the next round
- q = Qualified for the next round as a fastest loser or, in field events, by position without achieving the qualifying target
- NR = National record
- PB = Personal best
- SB = Season best
- N/A = Round not applicable for the event

=== Men ===
Track and road events

Athlete	Event	Heats		Semifinal		Final	
Athlete	Event	Result	Rank	Result	Rank	Result	Rank
Carlos Flórez	100 metres	10.42	7	Did not advance			
Ronal Longa	100 metres	10.21	3 Q	10.23	8	Did not advance	
Carlos San Martín	3000 metres steeplechase	9:02.20	10	—N/a		Did not advance	
César Herrera	20 kilometres walk	—N/a				1:25:01	40
Mateo Romero	20 kilometres walk	—N/a				1:22:44	29
César Herrera	35 kilometres walk	—N/a				DQ	
José Leonardo Montaña	35 kilometres walk	—N/a				DQ	

Field events

Athlete	Event	Qualification		Final	
Athlete	Event	Distance	Position	Distance	Position
Arnovis Dalmero	Long jump	7.59	31	Did not advance	
Mauricio Ortega	Discus throw	60.57	27	Did not advance	
Billy Julio	Javelin throw	76.01	34	Did not advance	

=== Women ===
Track and road events

Athlete	Event	Heats		Semifinal		Final	
Athlete	Event	Result	Rank	Result	Rank	Result	Rank
Marlet Ospino	100 metres	11.63	7	Did not advance			
Evelis Aguilar	400 metres	53.82	9	Did not advance			
Lucy Mendoza	20 kilometres walk	—N/a				1:38:05	40
Laura Chalarca	20 kilometres walk	—N/a				1:42:08	41

Field events

Athlete	Event	Qualification		Final	
Athlete	Event	Distance	Position	Distance	Position
Hellen Tenorio	High jump	NM		Did not advance	
Natalia Linares	Long jump	6.66	6 q	6.92 =PB, =AU23R	3rd place, bronze medalist(s)
Valentina Barrios	Javelin throw	60.98	12 q	59.14	11
Flor Ruiz	Javelin throw	62.11 SB	8 q	62.32 SB	6

Combined events – Heptathlon

Athlete	Event	100H	HJ	SP	200 m	LJ	JT	800 m	Final	Rank
Martha Araújo	Result	13.13	1.74 m	13.98 m SB	24.67	6.38 m	47.00 m	2:19.18	6324	10
Martha Araújo	Points	1105	903	793	917	969	802	835	6324	10
