= Colombia at the 2017 World Championships in Athletics =

- Flag of Colombia
- WA code: COL
- National federation: Colombian Athletics Federation
- Website: www.fecodatle.com (in Spanish)

in London, United Kingdom 4 August 2017 – 13 August 2017
- Competitors: 19 (10 men and 9 women) in 15 events
- Medals Ranked =11th: Gold 1 Silver 1 Bronze 0 Total 2

World Championships in Athletics appearances
- 1983; 1987; 1991; 1993; 1995; 1997; 1999; 2001; 2003; 2005; 2007; 2009; 2011; 2013; 2015; 2017; 2019; 2022; 2023; 2025

Colombia competed at the 2017 World Championships in Athletics in London, United Kingdom, from 4–13 August 2017.

== Medalists ==
Medal	Athlete	Event	Date
Gold	Éider Arévalo	Men's 20 km walk	August 13
Silver	Caterine Ibargüen	Women's triple jump	August 7

== Results ==
=== Men ===
Track and road events

Athlete	Event	Heat		Semifinal		Final	
Athlete	Event	Result	Rank	Result	Rank	Result	Rank
Diego Palomeque	100 metres	10.51	41	Did not advance			
Bernardo Baloyes	200 metres	20.83	38	Did not advance			
Yilmar Herrera	400 metres	47.18	44	Did not advance			
Jhon Solís; Diego Palomeque; Yilmar Herrera; Jhon Perlaza	4 × 400 metres relay	3:03.68 SB	12	—		Did not advance	
Éider Arévalo	20 kilometres walk	—				1:18:53 NR	1st place, gold medalist(s)
Manuel Esteban Soto	20 kilometres walk	—				1:24:56	47
Luis Fernando López	50 kilometres walk	—				DNF	–
Jorge Armando Ruiz	50 kilometres walk	—				3:50:37 PB	20

Field events

Athlete	Event	Qualification		Final	
Athlete	Event	Distance	Position	Distance	Position
Mauricio Ortega	Discus throw	62.97	16	Did not advance	

=== Women ===
Track and road events

Athlete	Event	Heat		Semifinal		Final	
Athlete	Event	Result	Rank	Result	Rank	Result	Rank
Johana Arrieta	800 metres	2:07.36	42	Did not advance			
Muriel Coneo	1500 metres	4:11.98 SB	36	Did not advance			
Muriel Coneo	5000 metres	15:26.18 NR	42	—		Did not advance	
Sandra Arenas	20 kilometres walk	—				1:28:10 NR	5
Yeseida Carrillo	20 kilometres walk	—				DQ	–
Sandra Galvis	20 kilometres walk	—				1:31:13	17

Field events

Athlete	Event	Qualification		Final	
Athlete	Event	Distance	Position	Distance	Position
Caterine Ibargüen	Triple jump	14.21	7 Q	14.89	2nd place, silver medalist(s)
Sandra Lemos	Shot put	16.36	27	Did not advance	
Flor Ruiz	Javelin throw	57.94	23	Did not advance	

Combined events – Heptathlon

Athlete	Event	100H	HJ	SP	200 m	LJ	JT	800 m	Final	Rank
Evelis Aguilar	Result	14.03	1.68	13.39	24.35	DNS	DNS	–	DNF	–
Evelis Aguilar	Points	974	830	753	947	0	0	–	DNF	–
