= Colombia at the 2019 World Athletics Championships =

- WA code: COL
- National federation: Colombian Athletics Federation
- Website: www.fecodatle.com (in Spanish)

in Doha, Qatar 27 September 2019 – 6 October 2019
- Competitors: 15 (10 men and 5 women) in 12 events
- Medals Ranked 24th: Gold 0 Silver 1 Bronze 1 Total 2

World Athletics Championships appearances (overview)
- 1983; 1987; 1991; 1993; 1995; 1997; 1999; 2001; 2003; 2005; 2007; 2009; 2011; 2013; 2015; 2017; 2019; 2022; 2023

Colombia competed at the 2019 World Athletics Championships in Doha, Qatar from 27 September to 6 October 2019. The country finished in 24th place in the medal table.

== Medalists ==
Medal	Athlete	Event	Date
Silver	Anthony Zambrano	Men's 400 metres	October 4
Bronze	Caterine Ibargüen	Women's triple jump	October 5

== Results ==
(q – qualified, NM – no mark, SB – season best)

=== Men ===
Track and road events

Athlete	Event	Heat		Semifinal		Final	
Athlete	Event	Result	Rank	Result	Rank	Result	Rank
Bernardo Baloyes	200 m	20.64	33	did not advance			
Jhon Perlaza	400 m	45.62	16 q	45.17	15	did not advance	
Anthony Zambrano	400 m	45.93	26 Q	44.55 NR	6 Q	44.15 AR	2nd place, silver medalist(s)
Gerard Giraldo	5000 m	did not finish		—		did not advance	
Carlos San Martín	3000 m steeplechase	8:35.10	33	—		did not advance	
Yohan Chaverra	110 m hurdles	13.76	31 Q	13.76	22	did not advance	
Jhon Perlaza; Diego Palomeque; Jhon Solís; Anthony Zambrano	4 × 400 me relay	3:01.06 NR	4 Q	—		2:59.50 NR	4
Jhon Castañeda	20 km walk	—				DSQ	

Field events

Athlete	Event	Qualification		Final	
Athlete	Event	Result	Rank	Result	Rank
Mauricio Ortega	Discus throw	61.92	20	did not advance	

=== Women ===
Track and road events

Athlete	Event	Heat		Semifinal		Final	
Athlete	Event	Result	Rank	Result	Rank	Result	Rank
Melissa Gonzalez	400 m hurdles	56.49	26	did not advance			
Sandra Arenas	20 km walk	—				1:34:16	5

Field events

Athlete	Event	Qualification		Final	
Athlete	Event	Result	Rank	Result	Rank
María Fernanda Murillo	High jump	1.85	24	did not advance	
Caterine Ibargüen	Triple jump	14.32	2 Q	14.73	3rd place, bronze medalist(s)
Yosiris Urrutia	Triple jump	13.77	19	did not advance	
