= Colombia at the 2013 World Championships in Athletics =

- WA code: COL
- National federation: Colombian Athletics Federation
- Website: www.fecodatle.com (in Spanish)

in Moscow 10 August 2013 – 18 August 2013
- Competitors: 20
- Medals Ranked 13th: Gold 1 Silver 0 Bronze 0 Total 1

World Championships in Athletics appearances
- 1983; 1987; 1991; 1993; 1995; 1997; 1999; 2001; 2003; 2005; 2007; 2009; 2011; 2013; 2015; 2017; 2019; 2022; 2023

Colombia is competing at the 2013 World Championships in Athletics in Moscow, Russia, from 10 to 18 August 2013. A team of 20 athletes was announced to represent the country in the event.

== Results ==
(q – qualified, NM – no mark, SB – season best)

== Men ==
Track and road events

Athlete	Event	Preliminaries		Heats		Semifinals		Final	
Athlete	Event	Time	Rank	Time	Rank	Time	Rank	Time	Rank
Bernardo Baloyes	200 metres			22.37	54	Did not advance			
Rafith Rodríguez	800 metres			1:46.76	15 q	2:01.94	23	did not advance	
Éider Arévalo	20 kilometres walk							DNF	–
Luis Fernando López	20 kilometres walk							DNF	–
José Leonardo Montaña	20 kilometres walk							1:23:50	17
Fredy Hernández	50 kilometres walk							DNF	–

== Women ==
Track and road events

Athlete	Event	Preliminaries		Heats		Semifinals		Final	
Athlete	Event	Time	Rank	Time	Rank	Time	Rank	Time	Rank
Rosibel García	1500 metres			4:15.38 NR	34	did not advance			
Carolina Tabares	5000 metres			16:22.81	20			did not advance	
Lina Flórez	100 metres hurdles			13.16	18 q	13.01	15	did not advance	
Brigitte Merlano	100 metres hurdles			13.20	21 q	13.22	22	did not advance	
Lina Flórez; Yomara Hinestroza; María Alejandra Idrobo; Darlenys Obregón; Eliecith Palacios	4 × 100 metres relay			43.65 SB	15			did not advance	
Erika Abril	Marathon							2:55:13	39
Sandra Arenas	20 kilometres walk							1:32:25	22
Sandra Galvis	20 kilometres walk							1:33:49	33

Field events

Athlete	Event	Preliminaries		Final	
Athlete	Event	Width Height	Rank	Width Height	Rank
Caterine Ibargüen	Triple jump	14.52	2 Q	14.85	1st place, gold medalist(s)
Sandra Lemos	Shot put	17.55	17	did not advance	
Flor Ruiz	Javelin throw	57.47	23	did not advance	
