= Colombia at the 2015 World Championships in Athletics =

- WA code: COL
- National federation: Colombian Athletics Federation
- Website: www.fecodatle.com (in Spanish)

in Beijing 22 August 2015 – 30 August 2015
- Competitors: 12
- Medals Ranked 15th: Gold 1 Silver 0 Bronze 0 Total 1

World Championships in Athletics appearances
- 1983; 1987; 1991; 1993; 1995; 1997; 1999; 2001; 2003; 2005; 2007; 2009; 2011; 2013; 2015; 2017; 2019; 2022; 2023; 2025

Colombia competed at the 2015 World Championships in Athletics in Beijing, China, from 22–30 August 2015.

== Medalists ==
Medal	Athlete	Event	Date
Gold	Caterine Ibargüen	Triple jump	24 August

== Results ==
(q – qualified, NM – no mark, SB – season best)

=== Men ===
Track and road events

Athlete	Event	Heat		Semifinal		Final	
Athlete	Event	Result	Rank	Result	Rank	Result	Rank
Rafith Rodríguez	800 metres	1:46.39	3 Q	1:45.63	6	did not advance	
Gerard Giraldo	3000 metres steeplechase	9:16.47	12	—N/a		did not advance	
Éider Arévalo	20 kilometres walk	—N/a				1:21:13	7
Kenny Martín Pérez	20 kilometres walk	—N/a				1:29:31	50
José Leonardo Montaña	20 kilometres walk	—N/a				1:23:53	22
Luis Fernando López	50 kilometres walk	—N/a				3:55:43 PB	20

Field events

Athlete	Event	Qualification		Final	
Athlete	Event	Distance	Position	Distance	Position
Mauricio Ortega	Discus throw	62.54 q	11	62.01	11

=== Women ===
Track and road events

Athlete	Event	Heat		Semifinal		Final	
Athlete	Event	Result	Rank	Result	Rank	Result	Rank
Muriel Coneo	1500 metres	4:08.31 NR	10 q	4:18.14	12	did not advance	
Muriel Coneo	3000 metres steeplechase	9:55.53	10	—N/a		did not advance	
Sandra Arenas	20 kilometres walk	—N/a				1:33:24	19

Field events

Athlete	Event	Qualification		Final	
Athlete	Event	Distance	Position	Distance	Position
Caterine Ibargüen	Triple jump	14.42	2 Q	14.90 SB	1st place, gold medalist(s)
Yosiris Urrutia	Triple jump	13.84	12 q	14.09	10
Flor Ruiz	Javelin throw	57.25	27	did not advance	

Combined events – Heptathlon

Athlete	Event	100H	HJ	SP	200 m	LJ	JT	800 m	Final	Rank
Evelis Aguilar	Result	did not start								
