= 2012 World Junior Championships in Athletics – Men's 10,000 metres walk =

The men's 10,000 metres race walk at the 2012 World Junior Championships in Athletics was held at the Estadi Olímpic Lluís Companys on 13 July.

== Medalists ==
Gold	Silver	Bronze
Éider Arévalo; Colombia	Aleksandr Ivanov; Russia	Su Guanyu; China

== Records ==
Prior to the competition, the existing world junior and championship records were as follows.

World Junior Record	Viktor Burayev (RUS)	38:46.4	Moscow, Russia	20 May 2000
Championship Record	Stanislav Emelyanov (RUS)	39:35.01	Bydgoszcz, Poland	11 July 2008
World Junior Leading	Benjamin Thorne (CAN)	40:26.0	Calgary, Canada	30 June 2012
Broken records during the 2012 World Junior Championships in Athletics
World Junior Leading	Éider Arévalo (COL)	40:09.74	Barcelona, Spain	13 July 2012

== Results ==
Rank	Name	Nationality	Time	Note
1st place, gold medalist(s)	Éider Arévalo	Colombia	40:09.74	WU20L
2nd place, silver medalist(s)	Aleksandr Ivanov	Russia	40:12.90	PB
3rd place, bronze medalist(s)	Guanyu Su	China	40:16.87	PB
4	Takumi Saito	Japan	40:19.10	NU20R
5	Álvaro Martín	Spain	40:35.52	PB
6	Jesús Vega	Mexico	41:05.59	PB
7	Nils Brembach	Germany	41:19.12	
8	Igor Liaschenko	Ukraine	41:21.60	SB
9	Yosuke Kimura	Japan	41:41.52	PB
10	Marco Antonio Rodríguez	Bolivia	42:05.91	NU20R
11	Pavel Parshin	Russia	42:10.25	
12	Vito Minei	Italy	42:51.79	PB
13	Tyler Sorensen	United States	42:53.60	SB
14	Andrii Hrechkovskyi	Ukraine	43:01.58	PB
15	Marius Šavelskis	Lithuania	43:03.27	SB
16	Kenny Martín Pérez	Colombia	43:04.02	SB
17	Blake Steele	Australia	43:04.81	PB
18	Konstadínos Dedópoulos	Greece	43:07.11	
19	Paolo Yurivilca	Peru	43:10.15	PB
20	Edgars Gjacs	Latvia	43:10.59	PB
21	Erwin González	Mexico	43:11.21	
22	Francesco Fortunato	India	43:13.27	
23	Neeraj Neeraj	Italy	43:27.92	PB
24	Sahin Senoduncu	Turkey	43:29.28	NU20R
25	Yauhen Zaleski	Belarus	44:09.05	PB
26	Óscar Villavicencio	Ecuador	44:25.12	
27	Adrian Ionut Dragomir	Romania	44:29.12	
28	Barys Sharhar	Belarus	44:32.68	
29	Marc Tur	Spain	44:42.41	
30	Samuel Pereira	Portugal	45:06.34	
31	Brian Pintado	Ecuador	45:13.84	PB
32	Luis Ángel Sánchez	Guatemala	45:36.65	
33	Tewfik Yesref	Algeria	45:38.36	PB
34	Kuldeep Kuldeep	India	45:40.65	
35	Peter Tichý	Slovakia	47:21.63	
36	Joakim Saelen	Norway	48:50.80	PB
–	Brad Aiton	Australia	DSQ	
–	Benjamin Thorne	Canada	DSQ	
–	Jiaxing Yin	China	DSQ	
–	Bruno Fidelis	Brazil	DNF	
–	Byeongho Choe	South Korea	DNF	

== Participation ==
According to an unofficial count, 40 athletes from 28 countries participated in the event.

- Algeria (1)
- Australia (2)
- Belarus (2)
- Bolivia (1)
- Brazil (1)
- Canada (1)
- China (2)
- Colombia (2)
- Ecuador (2)
- Germany (1)
- Greece (1)
- Guatemala (1)
- India (2)
- Italy (2)
- Japan (2)
- Latvia (1)
- Lithuania (1)
- Mexico (2)
- Norway (1)
- Peru (1)
- Portugal (1)
- Romania (1)
- Russia (2)
- Slovakia (1)
- Spain (2)
- Turkey (1)
- Ukraine (2)
- United States (1)
