= Colombia at the 2023 World Athletics Championships =

- Flag of Colombia
- WA code: COL
- National federation: Colombian Athletics Federation
- Website: www.fecodatle.com (in Spanish)

in Budapest, Hungary 19 August 2023 – 27 August 2023
- Competitors: 15 (7 men and 8 women)
- Medals Ranked 27th: Gold 0 Silver 1 Bronze 0 Total 1

World Athletics Championships appearances (overview)
- 1983; 1987; 1991; 1993; 1995; 1997; 1999; 2001; 2003; 2005; 2007; 2009; 2011; 2013; 2015; 2017; 2019; 2022; 2023

Colombia competed at the 2023 World Athletics Championships in Budapest, Hungary, from 19 to 27 August 2023.

== Medalists ==
Medal	Athlete	Event	Date
Silver	Flor Ruiz	Women's javelin	August 25

== Results ==
Colombia entered 15 athletes.

Key

- Q = Qualified for the next round
- q = Qualified for the next round as a fastest loser or, in field events, by position without achieving the qualifying target
- NR = National record
- PB = Personal best
- SB = Season best
- N/A = Round not applicable for the event

=== Men ===
Track and road events

Athlete	Event	Heat		Semifinal		Final	
Athlete	Event	Result	Rank	Result	Rank	Result	Rank
Ronal Longa	100 metres	11.31	8	Did not advance			
Anthony Zambrano	400 metres	DQ		Did not advance			
Éider Arévalo	20 kilometres walk	—				1:21:55	26
César Herrera	20 kilometres walk	—				1:27:47	46
Éider Arévalo	35 kilometres walk	—				DNF	
José Leonardo Montaña	35 kilometres walk	—				2:31:45 SB	17
Juan José Soto	35 kilometres walk	—				DQ	

Field events

Athlete	Event	Qualification		Final	
Athlete	Event	Distance	Position	Distance	Position
Geiner Moreno	Triple jump	NM		Did not advance	

=== Women ===
Track and road events

Athlete	Event	Heat		Semifinal		Final	
Athlete	Event	Result	Rank	Result	Rank	Result	Rank
Evelis Aguilar	400 metres	51.27 PB	5 q	51.07 PB	5	Did not advance	
Sandra Arenas	20 kilometres walk	—				DNF	
Arabelly Orjuela	35 kilometres walk	—				2:59:58 SB	23

Field events

Athlete	Event	Qualification		Final	
Athlete	Event	Distance	Position	Distance	Position
Natalia Linares	Long jump	6.38	25	Did not advance	
Mayra Gaviria	Hammer throw	66.82	32	Did not advance	
María Lucelly Murillo	Javelin throw	62.72 PB	5 Q	54.85	11
Flor Ruiz	Javelin throw	62.05 SB	7 Q	65.47 AR	2nd place, silver medalist(s)

Combined events – Heptathlon

Athlete	Event	100H	HJ	SP	200 m	LJ	JT	800 m	Final	Rank
Martha Araújo	Result	13.65	1.65	12.71	25.67	5.90	44.87	DNS	DNF	
Martha Araújo	Points	1028	795	708	826	819	761	0	DNF	
