= 2019 World Athletics Championships – Men's 4 × 400 metres relay =

Men's 4 × 400 metres relay at the 2019 World Championships
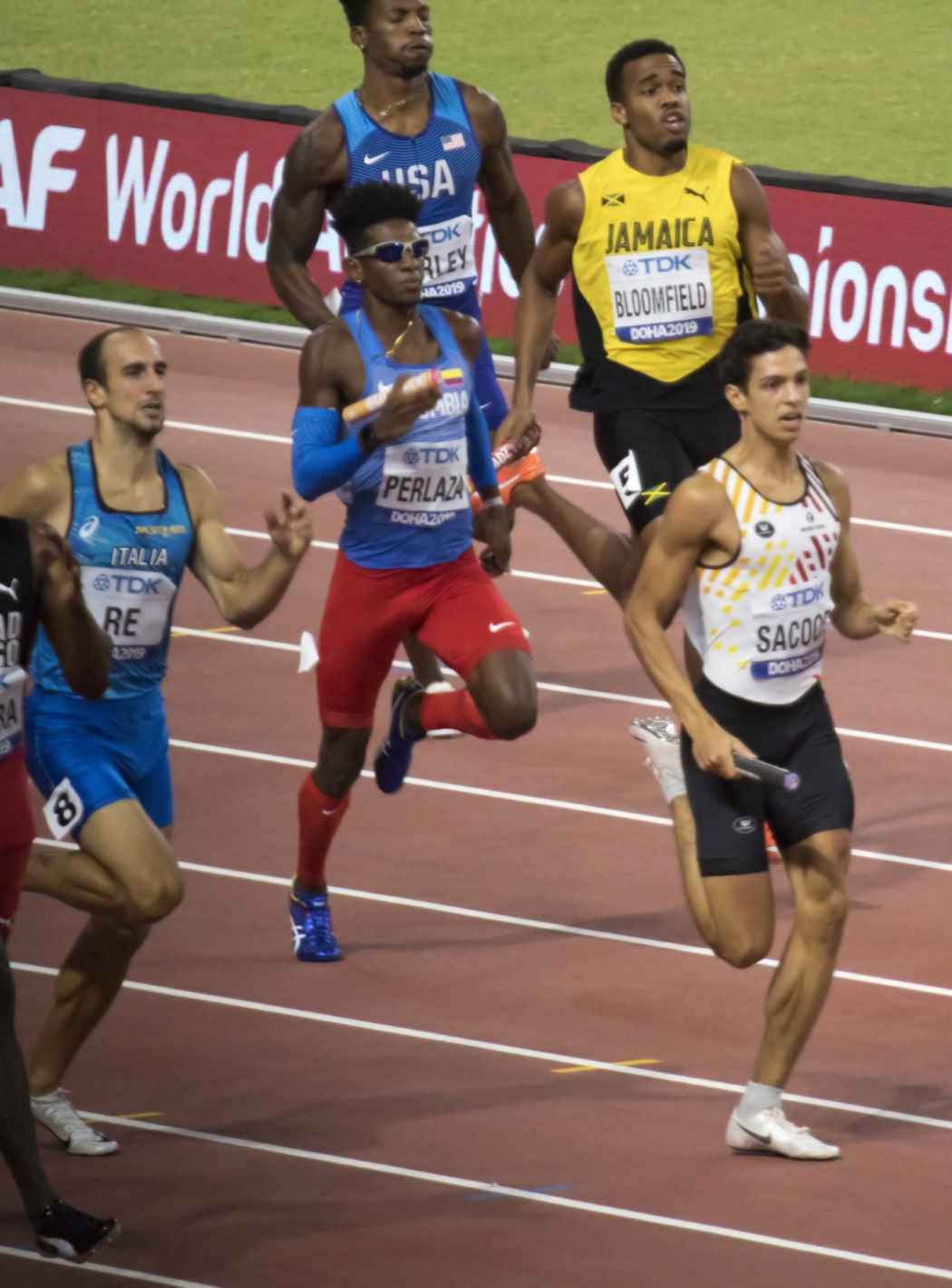
- Competitors running during the men's 4x400 final
- Venue: Khalifa International Stadium
- Dates: 5 October (heats); 6 October (final)
- Competitors: 71 from 16 nations
- Teams: 16
- Winning time: 2:56.69

Medalists
gold medal	Fred Kerley; Michael Cherry; Wilbert London; Rai Benjamin; Tyrell Richard*; Vernon Norwood*; Nathan Strother*	United States
silver medal	Akeem Bloomfield; Nathon Allen; Terry Thomas; Demish Gaye; Javon Francis*	Jamaica
bronze medal	Jonathan Sacoor; Robin Vanderbemden; Dylan Borlée; Kevin Borlée; Julien Watrin*	Belgium

Video on YouTube Official Video

The men's 4 × 400 metres relay at the 2019 World Athletics Championships was held at the Khalifa International Stadium in Doha, Qatar, from 5 to 6 October 2019.

== Summary ==
Colombia set a new national record in the qualifying round.

In the final event of these championships, USA was able to cast three fresh athletes into the final, with the only holdover Wilbert London. They led off with their bronze medalist Fred Kerley, but the early leader was Jamaica's Akeem Bloomfield, with Belgium's Jonathan Sacoor also in the mix. Down the home stretch, Kerley pulled back ground as Bloomfield slowed, by the handoff, USA had a step on Jamaica. Michael Cherry expanded USA's advantage over Jamaica's Nathon Allen through the turn to take 3 metres at the break. Behind him, Colombia's Diego Palomeque also ran a strong turn to pip Belgium's Robin Vanderbemden for third place. Through the final turn, Allen pulled in a metre on Cherry. While losing ground to the leaders, Trinidad and Tobago's Jereem Richards brought them into a 3-way battle for bronze. Onto the home stretch, Allen started losing ground to Cherry, sliding back toward the battle. With five metres, Cherry handed off to London, wearing a white sweatband on his head. In early strategy sessions, USA probably planned on their new superstar who wears a similar sweatband, Michael Norman, anchoring, but had to rearrange after Norman shut it down during his 400 semi-final. Jamaica's Terry Thomas took off after London, gaining strongly on the backstretch to shadow London through the final turn. Thomas set himself up to pounce coming off the turn, instead London slowly began widening the gap, getting the lead back to 4 metres before he named off to Norman's training partner, hurdler Rai Benjamin. Behind London and Thomas, Belgium's Dylan Borlée put an early gap on Colombia's Jhon Solís and was now free by 3 metres at the handoff to his brother Kevin Borlée. Benjamin slowly expanded his lead on Jamaica's Demish Gaye, by the finish it was 11 metres. Another 12 metres behind Jamaica, Borlée was able to hold off Colombia's new find, silver medalist Anthony Zambrano for bronze.

USA's 2:56.69 was the fastest relay in 11 years, number 11 on the all-time list. 8 of the 10 times ahead of them are also USA teams. Colombia set a new national record again in the final, a second and a half improvement, going under 3 minutes for the first time and moving their country into #15 on the all-time list.

== Records ==
Before the competition records were as follows:

Record	Perf.	Team	Date	Location
World	2:54.29	United States; Andrew Valmon, Quincy Watts, Butch Reynolds, Michael Duane Johnson	22 Aug 1993	Stuttgart, Germany
Championship	2:54.29	United States; Andrew Valmon, Quincy Watts, Butch Reynolds, Michael Duane Johnson	22 Aug 1993	Stuttgart, Germany
World leading	2:59.05	Texas A&M University; Bryce Deadmon, Robert Grant, Kyree Johnson, Devin Dixon	7 Jun 2019	Austin, United States
African	2:58.68	Nigeria; Clement Chukwu, Jude Monye, Sunday Bada, Enefiok Udo-Obong	30 Sep 2000	Sydney, Australia
Asian	3:00.56	Qatar; Abderrahman Samba, Mohamed Nasir Abbas, Mohamed El Nour, Abdalelah Haroun	30 Aug 2018	Jakarta, Indonesia
NACAC	2:54.29	United States; Andrew Valmon, Quincy Watts, Harry Reynolds, Michael Johnson	22 Aug 1993	Stuttgart, Germany
South American	2:58.56	Brazil; Eronilde de Araújo, Cleverson da Silva, Claudinei da Silva, Sanderlei Parrela	30 Jul 1999	Winnipeg, Canada
European	2:56.60	Great Britain; Jamie Baulch, Iwan Thomas, Mark Richardson, Roger Black	3 Aug 1996	Atlanta, United States
Oceanian	2:59.70	Australia; Bruce Frayne, Gary Minihan, Rick Mitchell, Darren Clark	11 Aug 1984	Los Angeles, United States

The following records were matched or set at the competition:

Record	Perf.	Team	Date
Colombian	3:01.06	Colombia; Jhon Perlaza, Diego Palomeque, Jhon Solís, Anthony Zambrano	5 Oct 2019
World leading	2:56.69	United States; Fred Kerley, Michael Cherry, Wilbert London, Rai Benjamin	6 Oct 2019
Colombian	2:59.50	Colombia; Jhon Perlaza, Diego Palomeque, Jhon Solís, Anthony Zambrano	6 Oct 2019

== Schedule ==
The event schedule, in local time (UTC+3), was as follows:

Date	Time	Round
5 October	20:25	Heats
6 October	21:30	Final

== Results ==
=== Heats ===
The first three in each heat (Q) and the next two fastest (q) qualified for the final.

Rank	Heat	Lane	Nation	Athletes	Time	Notes
1	1	4	United States	Tyrell Richard, Vernon Norwood, Wilbert London, Nathan Strother	2:59.89	Q
2	2	5	Jamaica	Akeem Bloomfield, Nathon Allen, Terry Thomas, Javon Francis	3:00.76	Q, SB
3	2	6	Belgium	Dylan Borlée, Julien Watrin, Jonathan Sacoor, Kevin Borlée	3:00.87	Q, SB
4	1	9	Colombia	Jhon Perlaza, Diego Palomeque, Jhon Solís, Anthony Zambrano	3:01.06	Q, NR
5	2	8	Trinidad and Tobago	Asa Guevara, Jereem Richards, Darren Alfred, Deon Lendore	3:01.35	Q
6	2	7	France	Ludvy Vaillant, Christopher Naliali, Thomas Jordier, Mame-Ibra Anne	3:01.40	q, SB
7	1	8	Italy	Edoardo Scotti, Vladimir Aceti, Matteo Galvan, Davide Re	3:01.60	Q, SB
8	1	6	Great Britain & N.I.	Cameron Chalmers, Rabah Yousif, Lee Thompson, Martyn Rooney	3:01.96	q, SB
9	1	7	Japan	Julian Walsh, Shōta Iizuka, Kentaro Sato, Kota Wakabayashi	3:02.05	SB
10	2	3	South Africa	Thapelo Phora, Gardeo Isaacs, Ranti Dikgale, Derrick Mokaleng	3:02.06	SB
11	2	9	Czech Republic	Jan Tesař, Michal Desenský, Patrik Šorm, Vít Müller	3:02.97	SB
12	2	4	India	Amoj Jacob, Muhammed Anas, Jeevan Karekoppa Suresh, Noah Nirmal Tom	3:03.09	
13	1	3	Spain	Óscar Husillos, Samuel García, Julio Arenas, Darwin Echeverry	3:04.27	SB
14	1	2	Australia	Steven Solomon, Alex Beck, Murray Goodwin, Ian Halpin	3:05.49	
15	2	2	Qatar	Bassem Hemeida, Abubaker Haydar Abdalla, Ashraf Hussein Osman, Mohamed Nasir Abbas	3:06.25	
	1	5	Botswana	Zibane Ngozi, Ditiro Nzamani, Onkabetse Nkobolo, Leungo Scotch	DQ	170.19

=== Final ===
The final was started on 6 October at 21:36.

Rank	Lane	Nation	Athletes	Time	Notes
1st place, gold medalist(s)	4	United States	Fred Kerley, Michael Cherry, Wilbert London, Rai Benjamin	2:56.69	WL
2nd place, silver medalist(s)	5	Jamaica	Akeem Bloomfield, Nathon Allen, Terry Thomas, Demish Gaye	2:57.90	SB
3rd place, bronze medalist(s)	7	Belgium	Jonathan Sacoor, Robin Vanderbemden, Dylan Borlée, Kevin Borlée	2:58.78	SB
4	6	Colombia	Jhon Perlaza, Diego Palomeque, Jhon Solís, Anthony Zambrano	2:59.50	NR
5	9	Trinidad and Tobago	Asa Guevara, Jereem Richards, Deon Lendore, Machel Cedenio	3:00.74	SB
6	8	Italy	Davide Re, Vladimir Aceti, Matteo Galvan, Edoardo Scotti	3:02.78	
7	3	France	Ludvy Vaillant, Christopher Naliali, Thomas Jordier, Mame-Ibra Anne	3:03.06	
	2	Great Britain & N.I.	Cameron Chalmers, Toby Harries, Rabah Yousif, Lee Thompson	DNF	
