= Athletics at the 2019 Pan American Games – Men's 4 × 400 metres relay =

Men's 4 × 400 metres relay at the 2019 Pan American Games
- Venue: Athletics Stadium
- Dates: August 10
- Competitors: 32 from 8 nations
- Winning time: 3:01.41

Medalists
Gold medal	Jhon Perlaza; Diego Palomeque; Jhon Solís; Anthony Zambrano	Colombia
Silver medal	Mar'yea Harris; Michael Cherry; Justin Robinson; Wilbert London	United States
Bronze medal	Dwight St. Hillaire; Jereem Richards; Deon Lendore; Machel Cedenio	Trinidad and Tobago

The men's 4 × 400 metres relay competition of the athletics events at the 2019 Pan American Games took place on the 10 of August at the 2019 Pan American Games Athletics Stadium. The defending Pan American Games champion is Trinidad and Tobago.

== Summary ==
The stagger largely held true into the final turn, with Colombia's Jhon Perlaza emerging ahead and powering down the home stretch to hand off a step ahead of Dwight St. Hillare for Trinidad and Tobago. Diego Palomeque led Colombia through the break but cut to the rail quickly, opening up space for Trinidad's World Championship relay gold medalist, Jereem Richards to zoom by. Richards held the lead until the home stretch when Palomeque paid him back, running past to hand off 3 steps ahead. Ten metres behind the leaders, USA's Michael Cherry put a strong move on Dominican Republic's Juander Santos to get into third place. Through the third leg USA's high school phenom Justin Robinson was not intimidated, closing down the gap on Trinidad's Olympic and World Championship relay medalist Deon Lendore and Colombia's Jhon Solis taking the lead before the handoff. USA's Wil London took the baton a step up on 400 champion Anthony Zambrano and Trinidad's Machel Cedenio, who is also a World Championship relay gold medalist. Down the backstretch, Cedenio went around the crowd and Zambrano tried to follow. London accelerated through the final turn, moving onto Cedenio's shoulder. Coming off the turn he put the formula move on and was off to victory, except Zambrano moved right around London and was sprinting at a much faster speed giving Colombia the gold medal, Zambrano's second of these championships. USA took silver and virtually Trinidad and Tobago's A-team took bronze.

== Records ==
Prior to this competition, the existing world and Pan American Games records were as follows:

World record	United States	2.54.29	Stuttgart, Germany	August 22, 1993
Pan American Games record	Jamaica	2.57.97	Winnipeg, Canada	July 30, 1999

== Schedule ==
Date	Time	Round
August 10, 2019	16:54	Final

== Results ==
All times shown are in seconds.

KEY:	q	Fastest non-qualifiers	Q	Qualified	NR	National record	PB	Personal best	SB	Seasonal best	DQ	Disqualified

=== Final ===
The results were as follows:

Rank	Lane	Nation	Name	Time	Notes
1st place, gold medalist(s)	8	Colombia	Jhon Perlaza, Diego Palomeque, Jhon Solís, Anthony Zambrano	3:01.41	SB
2nd place, silver medalist(s)	5	United States	Mar'yea Harris, Michael Cherry, Justin Robinson, Wilbert London	3:01.72	
3rd place, bronze medalist(s)	7	Trinidad and Tobago	Dwight St. Hillaire, Jereem Richards, Deon Lendore, Machel Cedenio	3:02.25	
4	4	Dominican Republic	Luis Charles, Juander Santos, Luguelín Santos, Leonel Bonon	3:05.64	
5	3	Cuba	Leonardo Castillo, Leandro Zamora, Raydel Rojas, Yoandys Lescay	3:05.87	SB
6	6	Jamaica	Rusheen McDonald, Romel Lewis, Terry Thomas, Javon Francis	3:06.83	
7	9	Bahamas	O'Jay Ferguson, Alonzo Russell, Andre Colebrook, Jeffery Gibson	3:09.98	
8	1	Venezuela	Kelvis Padrino, Alberto Aguilar, Usvard Zulueta, Omar Longart	3:10.65	
	2	Peru		DNS	
