= 2011 World Youth Championships in Athletics – Boys' 10,000 metres walk =

Boys' 10,000 metres walk at the 2011 World Youth Championships in Athletics
- Venue: Stadium Lille Métropole
- Dates: 9 July
- Competitors: 37
- Winning time: 40:51.31 CR

Medalists
gold medal	Pavel Parshin	Russia
silver medal	Kenny Martín Pérez	Colombia
bronze medal	Erwin González	Mexico

The boys' 10,000 metres walk at the 2011 World Youth Championships in Athletics was held at the Stadium Lille Métropole on 9 July.

== Medalists ==
Gold	Silver	Bronze
Pavel Parshin; Russia	Kenny Martín Pérez; Colombia	Erwin González; Mexico

== Records ==
Prior to the competition, the following records were as follows.

World Youth Best	Chen Ding (CHN)	39:47.20	Bydgoszcz, Poland	11 July 2008
World Youth Leading	Damir Baybikov (RUS)	42:36	Sochi, Russia	27 February 2011

== Final ==
Rank	Name	Nationality	Time	Notes
1st place, gold medalist(s)	Pavel Parshin	Russia	40:51.31	CR
2nd place, silver medalist(s)	Kenny Martín Pérez	Colombia	40:59.25	PB
3rd place, bronze medalist(s)	Erwin González	Mexico	41:09.60	PB
4	Jesús Tadeo Vega	Mexico	41:09.61	PB
5	Tyler Sorensen	United States	41:23.14	PB
6	Wang Kaihua	China	41:50.75	PB
7	Yin Jiaxing	China	42:04.37	PB
8	Álvaro Martín	Spain	42:27.28	PB
9	Patrik Spevák	Slovakia	42:39.78	
10	Brian Pintado	Ecuador	42:44.02	PB
11	Marco Antonio Rodríguez	Bolivia	42:52.71	PB
12	Marius Šavelskis	Lithuania	43:02.57	PB
13	Artsiom Turkou	Belarus	43:54.22	PB
14	Sergio Carrillo	Peru	44:18.45	PB
15	Kuldeep Kumar	India	44:48.73	PB
16	Brad Aiton	Australia	45:00.02	PB
17	Arturo Peralbo	Spain	45:00.21	
18	Jesse Osborne	Australia	45:11.78	
19	Aymene Sabri	Algeria	45:12.70	PB
20	Adrian-Ionuț Dragomir	Romania	45:13.99	PB
21	Şahin Şenoduncu	Turkey	45:14.55	PB
22	Adrien Cassagnes	France	46:06.94	PB
23	Mohamed Ramoul	Algeria	46:14.88	PB
24	Konstadinos Dedopoulos	Greece	46:34.87	
25	Cosmin Bahneanu	Romania	46:46.17	PB
26	Miguel Carvalho	Portugal	47:40.46	PB
27	Lee Jun-hyeok	South Korea	47:53.12	
28	Ghassen Saidi	Tunisia	47:53.23	PB
29	Evan Lynch	Ireland	49:17.95	PB
30	Raivo Saulgriezis	Latvia	51:44.91	
	Vito Minei	Italy	DNF	
	Michele Palmisano	Italy	DNF	
	Richard Vargas	Venezuela	DNF	
	Andrej Dolinský	Slovakia	DQ	
	Mohamed Ragab	Egypt	DQ	
	Manuel Esteban Soto	Colombia	DQ	
	Denis Tolstov	Russia	DQ	
