= Colombia at the 2011 World Championships in Athletics =

- WA code: COL
- National federation: Colombian Athletics Federation
- Website: www.fecodatle.com (in Spanish)

in Daegu 27 August 2011 – 4 September 2011
- Competitors: 20
- Medals Ranked 11th: Gold 1 Silver 0 Bronze 1 Total 2

World Championships in Athletics appearances
- 1983; 1987; 1991; 1993; 1995; 1997; 1999; 2001; 2003; 2005; 2007; 2009; 2011; 2013; 2015; 2017; 2019; 2022; 2023; 2025

Colombia competed at the 2011 World Championships in Athletics from August 27 to September 4 in Daegu, South Korea.

== Team selection ==
A team of 21 athletes was announced to represent the country in the event. The team is led by triple jumper Caterine Ibargüen, the new continental record holder.

The following athletes appeared on the preliminary Entry List, but not on the Official Start List of the specific event, resulting in total number of 20 competitors:

KEY:	Did not participate	Competed in another event

	Event	Athlete
Women	4 x 100 metres relay	Eliecith Palacios
Women	4 x 100 metres relay	Lina Flórez

== Medalists ==
The following Colombian competitors won medals at the Championships

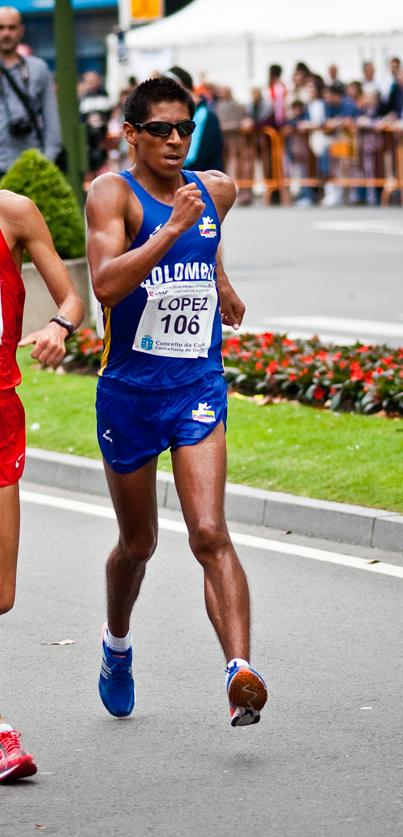
Luis Fernando López won a gold medal in the Men's 20 kilometres race walk event at this year's championships (foto archived from La Coruña 2010)

Medal	Athlete	Event
Gold	Luis Fernando López	20 kilometres walk
Bronze	Caterine Ibargüen	Triple jump

== Results ==
=== Men ===
Athlete	Event	Preliminaries		Heats		Semifinals		Final	
Athlete	Event	Time Width Height	Rank	Time Width Height	Rank	Time Width Height	Rank	Time Width Height	Rank
Álvaro Gómez	100 metres			10.62	41	Did not advance			
Daniel Grueso	200 metres			20.87	26	Did not advance			
Rafith Rodríguez	800 metres			1:48.26	30 Q	1:46.41	15	Did not advance	
Paulo Villar	110 m hurdles			13.55	15 Q	13.73	13	Did not advance	
Luis Fernando López	20 kilometres walk							1:20:38 SB	1st place, gold medalist(s)
James Rendón	20 kilometres walk							1:24:08 SB	19
Gustavo Restrepo	20 kilometres walk							DSQ	
Arley Ibargüen	Javelin throw	74.02	27					Did not advance	

=== Women ===
Athlete	Event	Preliminaries		Heats		Semifinals		Final	
Athlete	Event	Time Width Height	Rank	Time Width Height	Rank	Time Width Height	Rank	Time Width Height	Rank
Yomara Hinestroza	100 metres			11.56	35	Did not advance			
Norma González	400 metres			53.35	23 q	52.29	17	Did not advance	
Rosibel García	800 metres			2:01.33 SB	12 Q	2:00.79 SB	14	Did not advance	
Lina Flórez	100 m hurdles			12.98	13 Q	12.94 PB	14	Did not advance	
Brigitte Merlano	100 m hurdles			13.23	23 Q	13.21	21	Did not advance	
Ángela Figueroa	3000 metres steeplechase			10:06.00	28			Did not advance	
Yomara Hinestroza; María Alejandra Idrobo; Darlenis Obregón; Norma González	4 x 100 metres relay			43.53 SB	10			Did not advance	
Arabelly Orjuela	20 kilometres walk							1:39:28	32
Ingrid Hernández	20 kilometres walk							1:39:53	33
Caterine Ibargüen	Triple jump	14.52	3 Q					14.84	3rd place, bronze medalist(s)
María Lucelly Murillo	Javelin throw	52.83	28					Did not advance	
