= Colombia at the 2009 World Championships in Athletics =

- WA code: COL
- National federation: Colombian Athletics Federation
- Website: www.fecodatle.com (in Spanish)

in Berlin, Germany 15 August 2009 – 23 August 2009
- Competitors: 11 (4 men, 7 women)
- Medals: Gold 0 Silver 0 Bronze 0 Total 0

World Championships in Athletics appearances
- 1983; 1987; 1991; 1993; 1995; 1997; 1999; 2001; 2003; 2005; 2007; 2009; 2011; 2013; 2015; 2017; 2019; 2022; 2023

Colombia competes at the 2009 World Championships in Athletics from 15–23 August in Berlin.

== Team selection ==
Track and road events

Event	Athletes	
Event	Men	Women
100 metres	Daniel Grueso	Yomara Hinestroza
200 metres	Daniel Grueso	Darlenis Obregón
400 metres		Norma González
800 metres		Rosibel García
100 metres hurdles		Brigitte Merlano
110 metres hurdles	Paulo Villar	
4 × 100 metres relay		TBA
20 kilometres race walk	Luis Fernando López	

Field and combined events

Event	Athletes	
Event	Men	Women
High jump		Caterine Ibargüen
Javelin throw	Arley Ibargüen	
Hammer throw		Johana Moreno
