= Aleksandr Ivanov (race walker) =

Russian racewalker

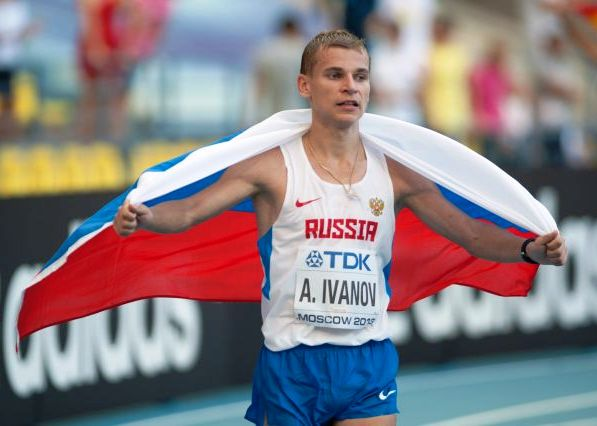
- Ivanov at the 2013 World Championships

Medal record

Men's athletics

Representing Russia

World Championships
Disqualified	2013 Moscow	20 km walk

European Championships
Disqualified	2014 Zürich	20 km walk

World Race Walking Cup
Disqualified	2012 Saransk	10 km walk

World Junior Championships
Disqualified	2012 Barcelona	10 km walk

Aleksandr Ivanov (born 25 April 1993 in Nizhny Tagil) is a Russian race walker who has been banned for life. The AIU ruled in August 2022 that all results, medals, titles, points, prize money and prizes earned by Ivanov from May 7, 2012, until August 25, 2022, are null and void.

Ivanov was hit with a doping ban in March 2019 and all of his results between July 9, 2012, and August 17, 2014, were annulled meaning that he was stripped of a gold medal in the 20 kilometres walk event at the 2013 World Championships in Athletics in Moscow, Russia, as well as a 2012 World Junior Championships silver medal and 2012 European Championships silver medal.

It was found he had 4-androstene-3,6, 17-trione and androsta-1,4,6-triene-3, 17-dione in his system in a urine sample taken by the Russian Anti-Doping Agency (RUSADA) in 2012. It was only in 2017 that the World Anti-Doping Agency secured data from the Moscow laboratory, supplied by a whistleblower.

- Aleksandr Ivanov at World Athletics
