= Jeison Suárez =

Colombian long-distance runner

Personal information
- Full name: Jeison Alexander Suárez Bocanegra
- Born: 21 March 1991 (age 35) Líbano, Tolima, Colombia
- Height: 1.72 m (5 ft 8 in)
- Weight: 57 kg (126 lb)

Sport
- Country: Colombia
- Sport: Athletics
- Events: Half marathon; Marathon

Achievements and titles
- Personal bests: Half marathon: 1:03:45 (2022); Marathon: 2:10:51 NR (2021)
Medal record
Representing Colombia
Men's athletics
Event	1st	2nd	3rd
CAC Games	1	0	0
Bolivarian Games	1	0	0
Total	2	0	0
Central American and Caribbean Games
Gold medal – first place	2018 Barranquilla	Marathon
Bolivarian Games
Gold medal – first place	2017 Santa Marta	Half marathon

Jeison Alexander Suárez Bocanegra (born 21 March 1991) is a male Long-distance runner from Colombia. He won the gold medal in the men's half marathon at the 2017 Bolivarian Games and the men's marathon at the 2018 Central American and Caribbean Games. He represented Colombia at the 2020 Summer Olympics.
