= Akeem Bloomfield =

Jamaican sprinter (born 1997)

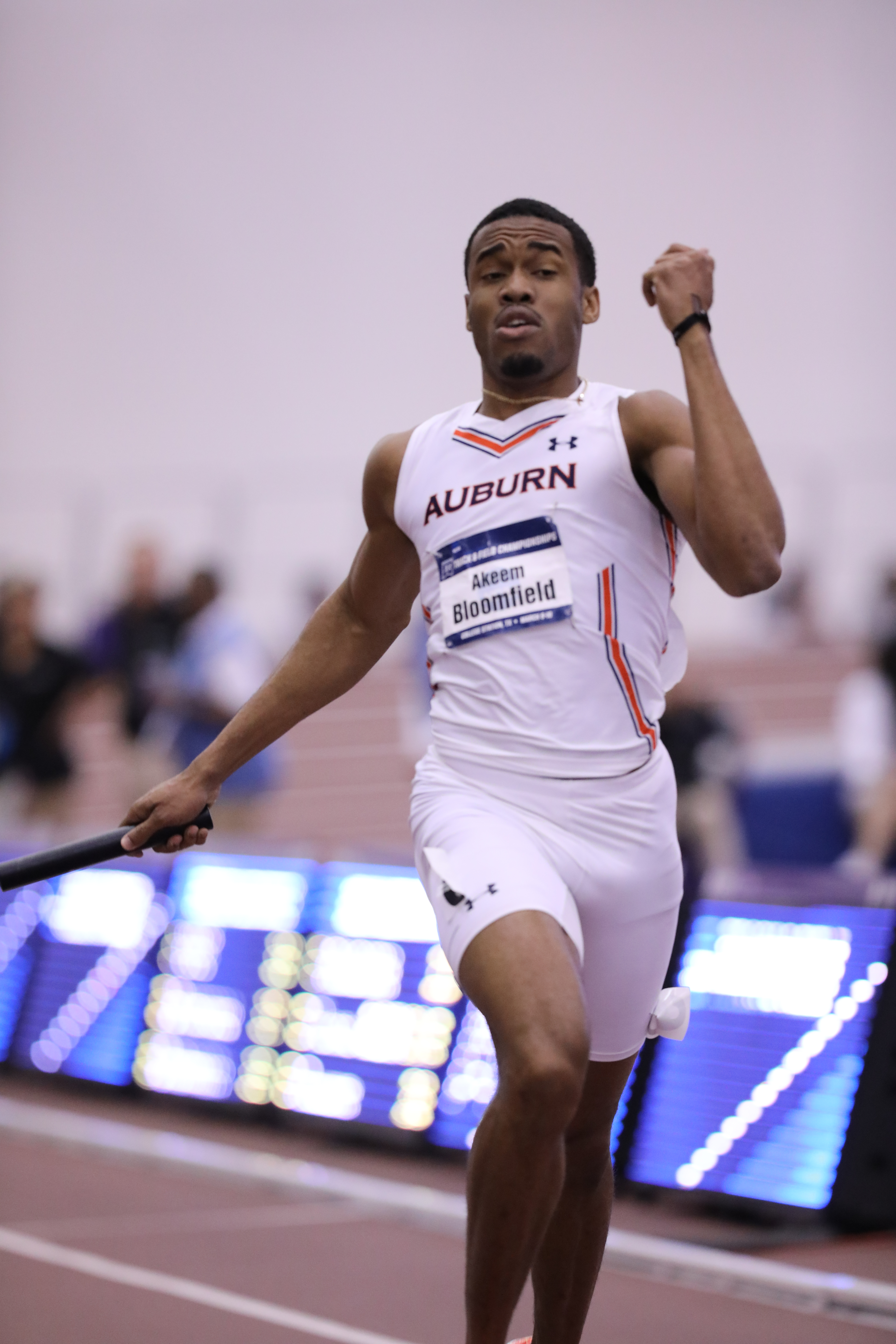
- Bloomfield at the 2018 NCAA Division I Indoor Championships

Personal information
- Born: 11 October 1997 (age 29) Kingston, Jamaica
- Height: 1.88 m (6 ft 2 in)
- Weight: 77 kg (170 lb)

Sport
- Country: Jamaica
- Sport: Track and field
- Event: Sprinting
- College team: Auburn Tigers
- Turned pro: 2018

Achievements and titles
- Personal bests: 200 m: 19.81 (London, 2018); 400 m: 43.94 (Eugene, 2018)
Medal record
Men's track and field
Representing Jamaica
World Championships
Silver medal – second place	2019 Doha	4×400 m relay
Silver medal – second place	2022 Eugene	4×400 m relay
World Relays
Silver medal – second place	2019 Yokohama	4×400 m relay
CARIFTA Games (U20)
Gold medal – first place	2016 St. George's	400 m
Gold medal – first place	2016 St. George's	4×400 m relay
Gold medal – first place	2015 Basseterre	400 m

Akeem Bloomfield (born 11 October 1997) is a retired Jamaican track and field athlete who specialized in sprint events specifically the 200 metres and 400 metres.

== Career ==
Running for Auburn University under coach Henry Rolle, he finished second in the 400 meters at the 2018 NCAA Championships behind Michael Norman of USC. His time of 43.94 ranks #17 on the all-time list, one of only 18 human beings to run the distance under 44 seconds. 15 days later, he signed a professional contract with Puma. Less than a month later, Bloomfield ran 200 meters in 19.81, at the London Anniversary Games. Video on YouTube. Bloomfield had never run under 20 seconds before, so his win was so unexpected, race announcers didn't even announce him as the winner until 20 seconds after the race when his name came up on the results display. That time also ranked him on the top 25 all-time list, joining Michael Johnson and Isaac Makwala as the only men to make both the current 200 and 400 lists.

Earlier in the season, Bloomfield finished second to Norman at the 2018 NCAA Indoor Championships. Norman set the world record of 44.52 in that race, Bloomfield's 44.86 ranks him at No. 6 on the all-time list and is the Jamaican indoor record.

Bloomfield had previously run for Kingston College. At the 2015 Jamaican National Championships, Bloomfield set the Jamaican Junior Record for 400 meters at 44.93.

Bloomfield announced his retirement in May 2024.

== Statistics ==
Information from World Athletics profile or Track & Field Results Reporting System unless otherwise noted.

=== Personal bests ===
Event	Time	Competition	Venue	Date	Notes
200 m	19.81	Müller Anniversary Games	London, England	22 July 2018	+0.1 m/s wind
400 m	43.94	NCAA Division I Championships	Eugene, Oregon, U.S.	13 July 2018	
400 m indoor	44.86	NCAA Division I Indoor Championships	College Station, Texas, U.S.	10 March 2018	Indoor NR
4×400 m relay	2:57.90	World Championships	Doha, Qatar	6 October 2019	
4×400 m relay indoor	3:05.30	NCAA Division I Indoor Championships	College Station, Texas, U.S.	10 March 2018	

=== International championship results ===
Year	Championship	Venue	Position	Event	Time
Representing Jamaica
2015	CARIFTA Games (U20)	Basseterre, Saint Kitts and Nevis	1st	400 m	45.85
2016	CARIFTA Games (U20)	St. George's, Grenada	1st	400 m	46.01
2016	CARIFTA Games (U20)	St. George's, Grenada	1st	4×400 m relay	3:10.55
2019	World Relays	Yokohama, Japan	2nd	4×400 m relay	3:01.57
2019	World Championships	Doha, Qatar	8th	400 m	45.36
2019	World Championships	Doha, Qatar	2nd	4×400 m relay	2:57.90
2022	World Championships	Eugene, United States	26th (h)	200 m	20.56

=== Circuit wins ===
==== 400 m ====
- Diamond League
  - Rabat: 2018
  - London: 2019
  - Birmingham: 2019
- World Indoor Tour
  - Glasgow: 2020

==== 200 m ====
- Diamond League
  - London: 2018
