= Terry Thomas (athlete) =

Jamaican track and field athlete (born 1997)

Personal information
- Full name: Terry Ricardo Thomas
- Nationality: Jamaican
- Born: 1 May 1997 (age 29)

Sport
- Country: Jamaica
- Sport: Athletics
- Event: 400 metres
Medal record
Men's track and field
Representing Jamaica
World Championships
Silver medal – second place	2019 Doha	4×400 m relay
World U20 Championships
Bronze medal – third place	2016 Bydgoszcz	4×400 m relay

Terry Ricardo Thomas (born 1 May 1997) is a Jamaican track and field athlete who specializes in middle-distance running. Representing Jamaica at the 2019 World Athletics Championships, he won a silver medal in men's 4 × 400 metres relay with the Jamaican team.
