= Kenny Martín Pérez =

Colombian racewalker (born 1994)

Personal information
- Born: 10 August 1994 (age 31)

Sport
- Country: Colombia
- Sport: Athletics
- Event: Race walking
Medal record
Representing Colombia
Men's athletics
Event	1st	2nd	3rd
World Team Championships (U20)	0	1	0
World U18 Championships	0	1	0
South American Race Walking Championships	0	0	1
Pan American U20 Championships	0	0	1
South American U23 Championships	0	1	1
Total	0	3	3
South American Race Walking Championships
Bronze medal – third place	2022 Lima	35 km walk
World Team Championships (U20)
Silver medal – second place	2012 Saransk	10 km walk (team)
World U18 Championships
Silver medal – second place	2011 Villeneuve-d'Ascq	10,000 m walk
Pan American U20 Championships
Bronze medal – third place	2013 Medellín	10,000 m walk
South American U23 Championships
Silver medal – second place	2016 Lima	20,000 m walk
Bronze medal – third place	2014 Montevideo	20,000 m walk
- Updated on 24 April 2026

Kenny Martín Pérez (born 10 August 1994) is a male Colombian racewalker. He competed in the 20 kilometres walk event at the 2015 World Championships in Athletics in Beijing, China, and finished the 50th, the last one of all participants who completed the distance.

== See also ==
- Colombia at the 2015 World Championships in Athletics
