= Marius Šavelskis =

Lithuanian racewalker (born 1994)

Personal information
- Born: July 30, 1994 (age 31) Lithuania
- Education: Lithuanian Sports University
- Height: 1.78 m (5 ft 10 in)
- Weight: 72 kg (159 lb)

Sport
- Country: Lithuania
- Sport: Athletics
- Event: 20km Race Walk

Marius Šavelskis (born 30 July 1994) is a race walker who competes internationally for Lithuania.

He represented Lithuania at the 2010 Summer Youth Olympics. In 2015 Šavelskis broke his personal best and reached qualification standard for 2016 Summer Olympics.

== Personal bests ==
Event	Result	Year	Place
10 km walk	41:52	2013	Poděbrady, Czech Republic
20 km walk	1:23:52	2015	Lugano, Switzerland
