= List of Colombian records in athletics =

The following are the national records in athletics in Colombia maintained by its national athletics federation: Federación Colombiana de Atletismo (FECODATLE).

== Outdoor ==
Key to tables: Awaiting ratification Record not kept by FECODATLE Not ratified or later rescinded by FECODATLE

=== Men ===
Event	Record	Athlete	Date	Meet	Place	Ref.
100 m	9.85 (+1.5 m/s) A	Ronal Longa	26 June 2026	Pan American Championships	Medellín, Colombia	
200 m	20.00 (+0.3 m/s)	Bernardo Baloyes	31 July 2018	CAC Games	Barranquilla, Colombia	
400 m	43.93	Anthony Zambrano	2 August 2021	Olympic Games	Tokyo, Japan	
600 m	1:16.69	Rafith Rodríguez	18 March 2017	11th Annual Spring Break Classic	Caguas, Puerto Rico	
800 m	1:44.31	Rafith Rodríguez	15 May 2011	Grand Prix Caixa Governo do Pará	Belém, Brazil	
1500 m	3:41.99	Carlos San Martín	14 June 2023	Gran Premio Diputación de Castellón - Memorial José Antonio Cansino	Castellón, Spain	
1500 m	3:39.95	Pedro Marín	18 June 2026	Meeting Internacional Ciudad de Málaga	Málaga, Spain	
3000 m	7:50.02	Domingo Tibaduiza	10 July 1978		Frankfurt, West Germany	
5000 m	13:21.31	Gerard Giraldo	2 May 2019	Payton Jordan Invitational	Palo Alto, United States	
5 km (road)	14:16	Pedro Rojas	27 September 1998		Zurich, Switzerland	
5 km (road)	14:07	Domingo Tibaduiza	16 June 1985		Oakland, United States	
10,000 m	27:53.02	Domingo Tibaduiza	11 June 1978		Vienna, Austria	
10 km (road)	28:51	Gerard Giraldo	8 September 2019		Tijuana, Mexico	
10 km (road)	28:37	Jacinto Navarrete	25 February 1989		Plant City, United States	
15 km (road)	43:55	Rolando Ortiz	25 January 2004		Girardot, Colombia	
15 km (road)	43:09	Jacinto Navarrete	11 February 1989		Tampa, United States	
20 km (road)	59:43	Orlando Guerrero	27 September 1998		Zurich, Switzerland	
One hour	20129 m	Víctor Mora	15 August 1973		Essen, West Germany	
Half marathon	1:01:29	Herder Vásquez	10 March 1996		Kyoto, Japan	
25 km (road)	1:16:53+	Jeison Suárez	18 April 2021	NN Mission Marathon	Enschede, Netherlands	
30 km (road)	1:32:20+	Jeison Suárez	18 April 2021	NN Mission Marathon	Enschede, Netherlands	
35 km (road)	1:47:49+	Jeison Suárez	18 April 2021	NN Mission Marathon	Enschede, Netherlands	
40 km (road)	2:03:44+	Jeison Suárez	18 April 2021	NN Mission Marathon	Enschede, Netherlands	
Marathon	2:10:51	Jeison Suárez	18 April 2021	NN Mission Marathon	Enschede, Netherlands	
110 m hurdles	13.27 A (+1.6 m/s)	Paulo Villar	28 October 2011	Pan American Games	Guadalajara, Mexico	
400 m hurdles	49.90 A	Yeison Rivas	19 November 2015		Medellín, Colombia	
3000 m steeplechase	8:25.66	Carlos San Martín	29 June 2021		Castellón, Spain	
High jump	2.33 m A	Gilmar Mayo	17 October 1994		Pereira, Colombia	
Pole vault	5.54 m	José Tomás Nieto	26 March 2026	Masked Rider Open	Lubbock, United States	
Long jump	8.20 m A (+0.8 m/s)	Arnovis Dalmero	5 August 2023	Grand Prix Internacional	Bogotá, Colombia	
Long jump	8.29 m (+0.6 m/s) (Note: mark annulled due to shoe specifications)	Arnovis Dalmero	28 July 2023	South American Championships	São Paulo, Brazil	
Triple jump	17.09 m (±0.0 m/s)	Jhon Murillo	16 August 2016	Olympic Games	Rio de Janeiro, Brazil	
Shot put	19.53 m	Eder Moreno	17 November 2012	National Games	Santander de Quilichao, Colombia	
Discus throw	70.29 m	Mauricio Ortega	22 July 2020		Lovelhe, Portugal	
Hammer throw	70.61 m A	Fabián Serna	16 March 2024 (Note: by World Athletics source; 17 March 2024 by FECODATLE source)	Campeonato Nacional de Lanzamientos y Velocidad	Cali, Colombia	
Hammer throw	70.70 m A	Fabián Serna	1 August 2025	Colombian Championships	Armenia, Colombia	
Javelin throw	82.39 m A	Dayron Márquez	10 July 2016	Medellín Meeting de Atletismo por el Sueño Olímpico	Medellín, Colombia	
Decathlon	7913 pts	José Lemos	29–30 July 2018	CAC Games	Barranquilla, Colombia	
Decathlon	100m (wind) / Long jump (wind) / Shot put / High jump / 400m / 110m H (wind) / Discus / Pole vault / Javelin / 1500m; 11.12 (+2.1 m/s) / 7.03 m (+0.9 m/s) / 16.60 m / 1.87 m / 51.14 / 14.58 (+1.9 m/s) / 55.12 m / 4.10 m / 65.80 m / 4:58.00					
Decathlon	8089 pts	Julio Angulo	1–2 December 2025	Bolivarian Games	Lima, Peru	
Decathlon	100m (wind) / Long jump (wind) / Shot put / High jump / 400m / 110m H (wind) / Discus / Pole vault / Javelin / 1500m; 10.80 (−0.3 m/s) / 7.37 m (+0.1 m/s) / 14.26 m / 2.02 m / 48.15 / 14.32 (+0.7 m/s) / 48.39 m / 4.50 m / 58.01 m / 4:57.79					
5000 m walk (track)	19:29.31 A	Manuel Esteban Soto	27 April 2024	Penn Relays	Philadelphia, United States	
5 km walk (road)	19:48.14	Luis Fernando López	6 August 2005		Helsinki, Finland	
10,000 m walk (track)	39:36.80 A	Éider Arévalo	2 August 2025	Colombian Championships	Armenia, Colombia	
10 km walk (road)	38:10	Luis Fernando López	18 September 2010	World Athletics Race Walking Challenge Final	Beijing, China	
15 km walk (road)	59:30.30+	Luis Fernando López	15 August 2009	World Championships	Berlin, Germany	
20,000 m walk (track)	1:20:36.6 h	Gustavo Restrepo	5 June 2011	South American Championships	Buenos Aires, Argentina	
20 km walk (road)	1:18:53	Éider Arévalo	13 August 2017	World Championships	London, United Kingdom	
Half marathon walk	1:26:39	Éider Arévalo	29 November 2025	Bolivarian Games	Lima, Peru	
Half marathon walk	1:23:59	Éider Arévalo	8 May 2026	Poděbrady Walking	Poděbrady, Czech Republic	
Half marathon walk	1:23:56 (Note: The accurate stopped time is 1:23:55.9)	César Herrera	23 September 2026	South American Games	Santa Fe, Argentina	
30 km walk (road)	2:09:49	Héctor Moreno	1 May 1991		Sesto San Giovanni, Italy	
35 km walk (road)	2:25:21	Éider Arévalo	24 July 2022	World Championships	Eugene, United States	
Marathon walk	3:15:49	César Herrera	6 December 2025	Bolivarian Games	Lima, Peru	
Marathon walk	3:06:59	César Herrera	12 April 2026	World Team Championships	Brasília, Brazil	
50,000 m walk (track)	4:17:11	Mauricio Cortés	16 November 1986		Caracas, Venezuela	
50 km walk (road)	3:47:41	James Rendón	14 September 2014	Chris Schmid Memorial 50k	Valley Cottage, United States	
4 × 100 m relay	38.66 A	Colombia; Neiker Abello; Carlos Flórez; Óscar Baltán; Jhonny Rentería	25 May 2024	Grand Prix Pre-Olympic	Bogotá, Colombia	
4 × 100 m relay	38.48 A	Colombia; Neiker Abello; Carlos Palacios; Pedro Agualimpia; Carlos Flórez	5 April 2025	Campeonato Nacional De Velocidad y Saltos	Bogotá, Colombia	
4 × 100 m relay	38.17	Colombia; Carlos Flórez; John Paredes; Neiker Abello; Ronal Longa	6 August 2026	CAC Games	Santo Domingo, Dominican Republic	
4 × 400 m relay	2:59.50	Colombia; Jhon Perlaza; Diego Palomeque; Jhon Solís; Anthony Zambrano	6 October 2019	World Championships	Doha, Qatar	

=== Women ===
Event	Record	Athlete	Date	Meet	Place	Ref.
100 m	11.17 (+0.7 m/s)	María Maturana	29 May 2026	Ibero-American Championships	Lima, Peru	
200 m	22.70 (−0.4 m/s) A	Lina Licona	9 June 2024	Grand Prix Sudamericano Julia Iriarte	Cochabamba, Bolivia	
400 m	49.64	Ximena Restrepo	5 August 1992	Olympic Games	Barcelona, Spain	
800 m	1:59.38	Rosibel García	16 August 2008	Olympic Games	Beijing, China	
1500 m	4:06.99	Muriel Coneo	3 June 2016	12th Meeting Iberoamericano	Huelva, Spain	
Mile (road)	4:51.73	Shellcy Sarmiento	26 April 2025	Adizero: Road to Records	Herzogenaurach, Germany	
3000 m	9:04.79	Muriel Coneo	14 May 2016	Ibero-American Championships	Rio de Janeiro, Brazil	
5000 m	15:26.18	Muriel Coneo	10 August 2017	World Championships	London, United Kingdom	
5 km (road)	16:16+	Yolanda Caballero	17 March 2013	New York City Half Marathon	New York City, United States	
5 km (road)	16:10+	Leidy Romero	5 April 2024	Festival of Running Asics Speed Race	Paris, France	
10,000 m	32:19.59	Carolina Tabares	2 May 2019	Payton Jordan Cardinal Invitational	Palo Alto, United States	
10 km (road)	33:06	Martha Ronceria	12 November 2006	Bogotá Nike Latinoamerica	Bogota, Colombia	
10 km (road)	32:54+ X	Yolanda Caballero	17 March 2013	New York City Half Marathon	New York City, United States	
15 km (road)	49:43+ X	Yolanda Caballero	17 March 2013	New York City Half Marathon	New York City, United States	
20 km (road)	1:06:45+ X	Yolanda Caballero	17 March 2013	New York City Half Marathon	New York City, United States	
Half marathon	1:11:21	Kellys Arias	26 March 2016	World Half Marathon Championships	Cardiff, United Kingdom	
Half marathon	1:10:28 (Note: by result source; 1:10:30 by federation source) X	Yolanda Caballero	17 March 2013	New York City Half Marathon	New York City, United States	
25 km (road)	1:26:24+	Angie Orjuela	24 September 2023	Berlin Marathon	Berlin, Germany	
25 km (road)	1:25:03+ a (Note: South America additionally ratify marks on aided courses)	Yolanda Caballero	18 April 2011	Boston Marathon	Boston, United States	
30 km (road)	1:43:31+	Angie Orjuela	24 September 2023	Berlin Marathon	Berlin, Germany	
30 km (road)	1:42:28+ a (Note: South America additionally ratify marks on aided courses)	Yolanda Caballero	18 April 2011	Boston Marathon	Boston, United States	
35 km (road)	2:00:37+	Angie Orjuela	24 September 2023	Berlin Marathon	Berlin, Germany	
40 km (road)	2:18:00+	Angie Orjuela	24 September 2023	Berlin Marathon	Berlin, Germany	
Marathon	2:25:35	Angie Orjuela	24 September 2023	Berlin Marathon	Berlin, Germany	
100 m hurdles	12.89 (+0.9 m/s)	Brigitte Merlano	17 July 2011	CAC Championships	Mayagüez, Puerto Rico	
100 m hurdles	12.74 (+1.3 m/s) A (Note: record set during heptathlon competition)	María Fernanda Murillo	27 June 2026	Pan American Championships	Medellín, Colombia	
100 m hurdles	12.64 (−0.4 m/s)	María Fernanda Murillo	5 August 2026	CAC Games	Santo Domingo, Dominican Republic	
400 m hurdles	54.80	Melissa Gonzalez	3 June 2022	Irena Szewińska Memorial	Bydgoszcz, Poland	
3000 m steeplechase	9:42.71	Ángela Figueroa	20 May 2012	Grande Prêmio Brasil Caixa de Atletismo	Rio de Janeiro, Brazil	
High jump	1.94 m A	María Fernanda Murillo	1 May 2019	Grand Prix Internacional "Ximena Restrepo"	Medellín, Colombia	
Pole vault	4.30 m	Katherine Castillo	29 May 2021	South American Championships	Guayaquil, Ecuador	
Pole vault	4.30 m	Katherine Castillo	7 July 2023	CAC Games	San Salvador, El Salvador	
Pole vault	4.30 m	Katherine Castillo	10 May 2024	Ibero-American Championships	Cuiabá, Brazil	
Long jump	6.93 m (+0.8 m/s)	Caterine Ibargüen	9 September 2018	Continental Cup	Ostrava, Czech Republic	
Long jump	6.95 m (−0.1 m/s)	Natalia Linares	1 December 2025	Bolivarian Games	Lima, Peru	
Triple jump	15.31 m (±0.0 m/s)	Caterine Ibargüen	18 July 2014	Herculis	Fontvieille, Monaco	
Shot put	18.03 m	Sandra Lemos	16 May 2013	Grande Premio Internacional Caixa	Uberlândia, Brazil	
Discus throw	59.43 m A	Yerlin Mesa	29 June 2024	Colombian Championships	Cali, Colombia	
Hammer throw	69.80 m	Johana Moreno	29 March 2009		Santa Fe, Argentina	
Javelin throw	67.34 m	Flor Ruiz	4 August 2026	CAC Games	Santo Domingo, Dominican Republic	
Heptathlon	6429 pts	Martha Araújo	14–15 September 2024	Décastar	Talence, France	
Heptathlon	100m H (wind) / High jump / Shot put / 200m (wind) / Long jump (wind) / Javelin / 800m; 13.12 (−0.2 m/s) / 1.75 m / 13.38 m / 24.31 (+0.2 m/s) / 6.49 m (+0.7 m/s) / 50.64 m / 2:19.80					
Heptathlon	6475 pts	Martha Araújo	31 May – 1 June 2025	Hypo-Meeting	Götzis, Austria	
Heptathlon	100m H (wind) / High jump / Shot put / 200m (wind) / Long jump (wind) / Javelin / 800m; 13.32 (−1.0 m/s) / 1.74 m / 13.85 m / 24.50 (−0.6 m/s) / 6.63 m (−0.6 m/s) / 49.42 m / 2:15.89					
5000 m walk (track)	21:30.33	Sandra Arenas	5 March 2023	Victorian Track & Field Championships	Melbourne, Australia	
5 km walk (road)	21:52	Sandra Arenas	2 June 2018		A Coruña, Spain	
10,000 m walk (track)	42:02.99	Sandra Arenas	25 August 2018	Ibero-American Championships	Trujillo, Peru	
10 km walk (road)	43:16	Sandra Arenas	25 September 2017		Suzhou, China	
15 km walk (road)	1:05:39+	Sandra Arenas	13 August 2017	World Championships	London, United Kingdom	
20,000 m walk (track)	1:31:02.60	Sandra Arenas				
20,000 m walk (track)	1:31:02.25	Sandra Arenas	13 June 2015	South American Championships	Lima, Peru	
20 km walk (road)	1:27:03	Sandra Arenas	1 August 2024	Olympic Games	Paris, France	
Half marathon walk	1:43:41	Laura Chalarca	28 February 2026	Colombian Race Walking Championships	Bogotá, Colombia	
Half marathon walk	1:41:55	Ruby Segura	12 April 2026	World Team Championships	Brasília, Brazil	
Half marathon walk	1:37:16	Laura Chalarca	23 May 2026	Gran Premio Cantones de A Coruña de Marcha	A Coruña, Spain	
35 km walk (road)	2:44:17	Sandra Arenas	16 March 2025 (Note: 15 March 2025 by FECODATLE)	World Athletics Race Walking Tour	Nomi, Japan	
Marathon walk						
4 × 100 m relay	43.03 A	Colombia; Melisa Murillo; Felipa Palacios; Darlenys Obregón; Digna Luz Murillo	10 July 2004		Bogotá, Colombia	
4 × 100 m relay	43.03	Colombia; Melisa Murillo; Felipa Palacios; Darlenys Obregón; Norma González	12 August 2005	World Championships	Helsinki, Finland	
4 × 400 m relay	3:29.94 A	Colombia; Princesa Oliveros; Norma González; Evelis Aguilar; Jennifer Padilla	28 October 2011	Pan American Games	Guadalajara, Mexico	
4 × 400 m relay	3:29.49 A	Colombia; Paola Loboa; Melany Bolaño; María Alejandra Rocha; Lina Licona	28 June 2026	Pan American Championships	Medellín, Colombia	
4 × 400 m relay	3:29.01	Colombia; Melany Bolaño; María Fernanda Murillo; María Alejandra Rocha; Lina Licona	7 August 2026	CAC Games	Santo Domingo, Dominican Republic	

=== Mixed ===
Event	Record	Athlete	Date	Meet	Place	Ref.
4 × 100 m relay	42.05	Colombia; Angélica Gamboa; Deiner Guaitoto; Enoc Moreno; Marlet Ospino	1 December 2025	Bolivarian Games	Lima, Peru	
4 × 100 m relay	41.63 A	Colombia; Angélica Gamboa; Danna Banquez; Carlos Flórez; Óscar Baltán	27 June 2026	Pan American Championships	Medellín, Colombia	
4 × 100 m relay	41.55	Colombia; Carlos Flórez; Marlet Ospino; Neiker Abello; Angélica Gamboa	4 August 2026	CAC Games	Santo Domingo, Dominican Republic	
4 × 400 m relay	3:14.48 A	Colombia; Jhon Perlaza; Lina Licona; Nicolás Salinas; Evelis Aguilar	7 April 2024	Encuentro FMAA César Moreno Bravo	Mexico City, Mexico	
4 × 400 m relay	3:14.42 A	Colombia; Nicolás Salinas; Lina Licona; Daniel Balanta; Evelis Aguilar	5 April 2025	Campeonato Nacional De Velocidad y Saltos	Bogotá, Colombia	

== Indoor ==
=== Men ===
Event	Record	Athlete	Date	Meet	Place	Ref.
60 m	6.56 A	Neiker Abello	20 February 2025	Meeting Jürgen Berodt	Cochabamba, Bolivia	
200 m	20.91	John Paredes	27 February 2026	Big 12 Championships	Lubbock, United States	
300 m	33.69	Óscar Baltán	10 January 2026	UK Rod McCravy Memorial	Louisville, United States	
400 m	46.07 (Note: by official result source; 45.07 by World Athletics source, probably a typo)	Jhon Perlaza	9 March 2019	NCAA Division I Championships	Birmingham, United States	
500 m	1:00.66	Jhon Perlaza	23 January 2021	Liberty Kickoff	Lynchburg, United States	
800 m	1:47.86	Rafith Rodríguez	14 February 2012	Meeting Hauts-de-France Pas-de-Calais	Liévin, France	
1500 m	3:54.06 A	Dylan Carrasco	28 February 2026	South American Championships	Cochabamba, Bolivia	
3000 m	7:49.46	Jacinto Navarrete	10 March 1991	World Championships	Seville, Spain	
Two miles	8:29.0 h	Jacinto Navarrete	22 February 1987		San Diego, United States	
5000 m	14:33.97	Rolando Ortíz	26 February 2024	Southland Conference Championships	Birmingham, United States	
60 m hurdles	7.61	Paulo Villar	11 March 2006 (sf)	World Championships	Moscow, Russia	
60 m hurdles	7.61	Paulo Villar	11 March 2006 (f)	World Championships	Moscow, Russia	
High jump	2.27 m	Gilmar Mayo	24 February 1999		Piraeus, Greece	
Pole vault	5.49 m	José Tomás Nieto	14 February 2026	Jarvis Scott	Lubbock, United States	
Long jump	8.16 A	Arnovis Dalmero	25 January 2024	Meeting Sudamericano "Jürgen Berodt”	Cochabamba, Bolivia	
Triple jump	16.22 m A	Geiner Moreno	28 January 2024	South American Championships	Cochabamba, Bolivia	
Shot put	18.10 m	Ronald Grueso	24 February 2024	Ken Shannon Last Chance	Seattle, United States	
Discus throw	57.62 m	Mauricio Ortega	10 February 2017	ISTAF Indoor	Berlin, Germany	
Heptathlon						
Heptathlon	60m / Long jump / Shot put / High jump / 60m H / Pole vault / 1000m					
5000 m walk	20:26.36	Cristián Rojas	13 February 2022		Pombal, Portugal	
4 × 400 m relay	3:16.92 A	Colombia; Adrián Mendoza; Cristian Ortega; Neiker Abello; Manuel Henao	1 March 2026	South American Championships	Cochabamba, Bolivia	

=== Women ===
Event	Record	Athlete	Date	Meet	Place	Ref.
55 m	7.00	Zandra Borrero	14 March 1998		Indianapolis, United States	
60 m	7.22 A	Marlet Ospino	20 February 2025	Meeting Jürgen Berodt	Cochabamba, Bolivia	
60 m	7.22 A	Marlet Ospino	22 February 2025	South American Championships	Cochabamba, Bolivia	
200 m	23.60	Samantha González	15 February 2025	Tyson Invitational	Fayetteville, United States	
400 m	52.12	Ximena Restrepo	9 March 1991		Indianapolis, United States	
800 m	2:09.95	Norfalia Carabalí	4 March 1993		Seville, Spain	
1500 m	4:15.73	Muriel Coneo	18 February 2018	İstanbul Cup	Istanbul, Turkey	
Mile	4:43.20	Danna Díaz	1 March 2025	American Athletic Conference Championships	Birmingham, United States	
3000 m	9:21.45	Danna Díaz	15 February 2025	Badgers Windy City Invite	Chicago, United States	
5000 m	17:40.23	Rosa Ibarra	1 March 1996		Lincoln, United States	
60 m hurdles	7.95	María Fernanda Murillo	22 March 2026	World Championships	Toruń, Poland	
High jump	1.87 m	Jennifer Rodríguez	26 February 2022	Josefa Sečkáře Meeting	Brno, Czech Republic	
High jump	1.87 m	María Arboleda	26 February 2026	Southeastern Conference Championships	College Station, United States	
Pole vault	3.91 m	Milena Agudelo	6 October 2004; 28 September 2005		Santa Fe, Argentina	
Long jump	6.80 m	Natalia Linares	22 March 2026	World Championships	Toruń, Poland	
Triple jump	12.36 m A	Anyi Paola Garcia	7 March 2015		Albuquerque, United States	
Shot put	11.78 m	Glenis Pino	10 December 2004		Manhattan, United States	
Pentathlon	3455 pts A	Estrella Lobo	28 February 2026	South American Championships	Cochabamba, Bolivia	
Pentathlon	60m H / High jump / Shot put / Long jump / 800m; 8.71 / 1.50 m / 11.31 m / 5.86 m / 2:52.31					
3000 m walk						
4 × 400 m relay						
