= Jhon Solís (sprinter) =

Colombian sprinter (born 1993)

Personal information
- Full name: Jhon Alexander Solís Mosquera
- Born: 24 June 1993 (age 33) Zarzal, Colombia

Sport
- Sport: Athletics
- Events: 400 metres; 4 × 400 metres relay
Medal record
Representing Colombia
Men's athletics
Pan American Games
| Gold medal – first place | 2019 Lima | 4×400 m relay |

Jhon Alexander Solís Mosquera (born 24 June 1993) is a Colombian sprinter specialising in the 400 metres. He represented his country in the 4 × 400 metres relay at the 2017 World Championships without qualifying for the final. He competed at the 2020 Summer Olympics.

His personal best in the event is 46.15 seconds set in Cochabamba in 2020.

== International competitions ==
| Year | Competition | Venue | Position | Event | Notes |
Representing Colombia
| 2011 | South American Junior Championships | Medellín, Colombia | 2nd | 4 × 400 m relay | 3:08.71 |
| 2017 | South American Championships | Asunción, Paraguay | 1st | 4 × 400 m relay | 3:05.02 |
| 2017 | World Championships | London, United Kingdom | 12th (h) | 4 × 400 m relay | 3:03.68 |
| 2018 | South American Games | Cochabamba, Bolivia | 10th (h) | 400 m | 48.53 |
| 2019 | World Relays | Yokohama, Japan | 8th (B) | 4 × 400 m relay | 3:07.52 |
| 2019 | Pan American Games | Lima, Peru | 1st | 4 × 400 m relay | 3:01.41 |
| 2019 | World Championships | Doha, Qatar | 4th | 4 × 400 m relay | 2:59.50 |
| 2021 | World Relays | Chorzów, Poland | 6th | 4 × 400 m relay | 3:05.91 |
| 2021 | Olympic Games | Tokyo, Japan | 13th (h) | 4 × 400 m relay | 3:03.20 |
| 2023 | South American Championships | São Paulo, Brazil | 4th | 4 × 400 m relay | 3:06.63 |
