= José Leonardo Montaña =

Colombian racewalker

José Leonardo Montaña Arévalo
Personal information
- Born: 21 March 1992 (age 34) Bogotá, Colombia
- Height: 1.73 m (5 ft 8 in)
- Weight: 66 kg (146 lb)

Sport
- Country: Colombia
- Sport: Athletics
- Event: Race walking
Medal record
Representing Colombia
Men's athletics
Event	1st	2nd	3rd
World Team Championships (U20)	0	0	1
Pan American Cup	1	0	0
CAC Games	0	0	2
South American Games	0	1	0
Bolivarian Games	0	2	0
Pan American U20 Championships	0	0	1
Pan American Cup (U20)	1	1	0
South American U23 Championships	0	1	0
Total	2	5	4
Pan American Cup
Gold medal – first place	2023 Managua	35 km walk
Central American and Caribbean Games
Bronze medal – third place	2014 Veracruz	20 km walk
Bronze medal – third place	2018 Barranquilla	50 km walk
South American Games
Silver medal – second place	2014 Santiago	20,000 m walk
Bolivarian Games
Silver medal – second place	2013 Trujillo	20 km walk
Silver medal – second place	2022 Valledupar	20 km walk
World Team Championships (U20)
Bronze medal – third place	2010 Chihuahua	10 km walk (team)
Pan American U20 Championships
Bronze medal – third place	2011 Miramar	10,000 m walk
Pan American Cup (U20)
Gold medal – first place	2011 Envigado	10 km walk (team)
Silver medal – second place	2011 Envigado	10 km walk
South American U23 Championships
Silver medal – second place	2012 São Paulo	20,000 m walk
- Updated on 14 April 2026

José Leonardo Montaña Arévalo (born 21 March 1992) is a male Colombian racewalker. He competed in the 20 kilometres walk event at the 2015 World Championships in Athletics in Beijing, China.

In 2021, he represented Colombia at the 2020 Summer Olympics and finished 11th in the men's 50 kilometres walk with a season best.

== See also ==
- Colombia at the 2015 World Championships in Athletics
