= Éider Arévalo =

Colombian race walker (born 1993)

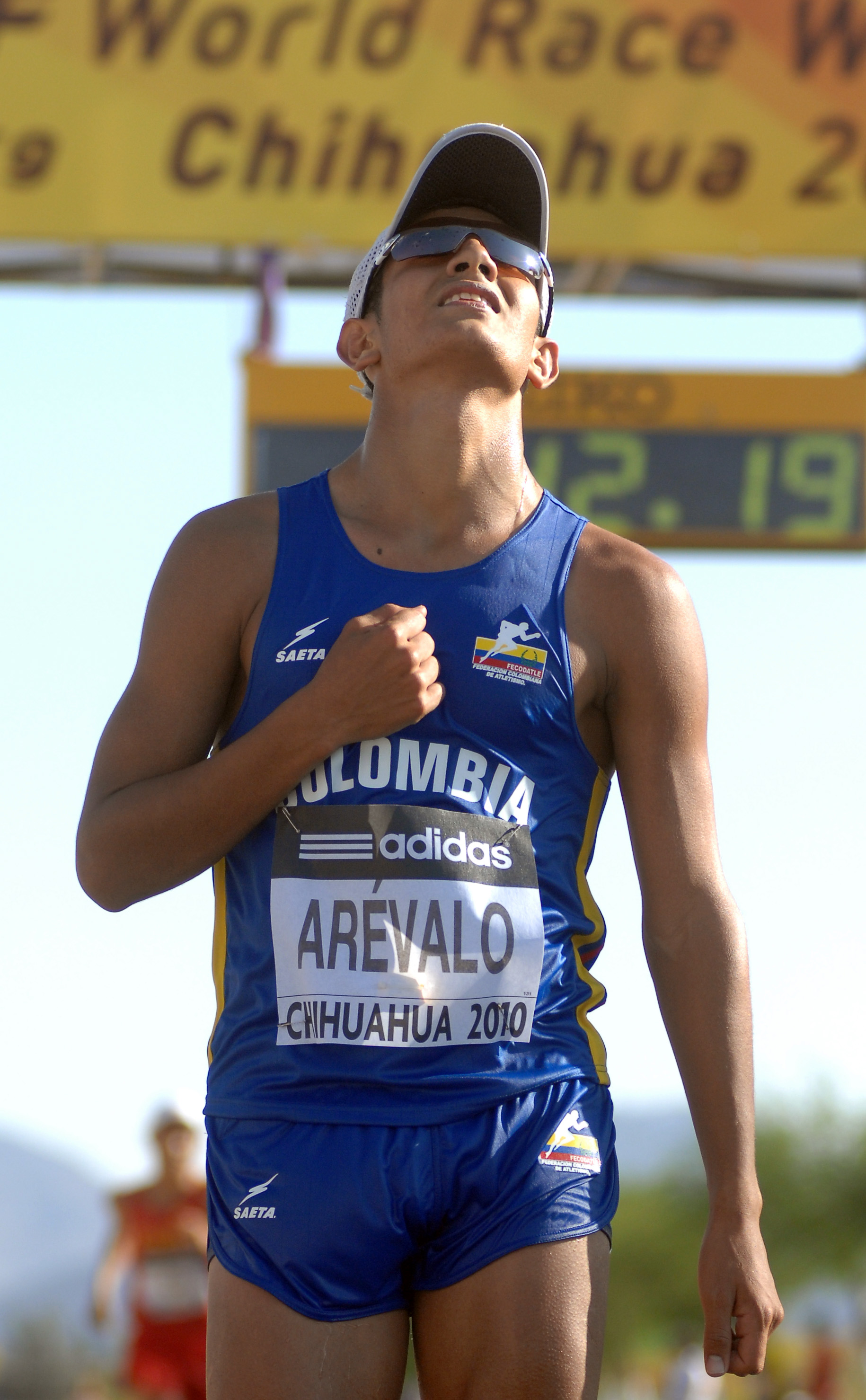
- Arévalo in 2010

Personal information
- Full name: Éider Orlando Arévalo Truque
- Nationality: Colombian
- Born: 9 March 1993 (age 33) Pitalito, Colombia
- Height: 1.65 m (5 ft 5 in)
- Weight: 58 kg (128 lb)

Sport
- Country: Colombia
- Sport: Athletics
- Event: Race walking
- Club: Liga de Bogotá
- Coached by: Luis Fernando López

Achievements and titles
- Personal bests: 5,000 m walk: 21:47.14 (2009); 10,000 m walk: 39:36.80 NR (2025); 20,000 m walk: 1:22:11.1 (2014); 10 km walk: 40:11 (2014); 20 km walk: 1:18:53 NR (2017); 35 km walk: 2:25:21 NR (2022); Half marathon walk: 1:23:59 NR (2026)
Medal record
Representing Colombia
Men's athletics
Senior level
Event	1st	2nd	3rd
World Championships	1	0	0
Pan American Championships	0	0	1
Pan American Cup	2	0	0
CAC Games	1	2	0
South American Games	1	0	0
South American Championships	0	1	0
Bolivarian Games	0	0	2
Total	5	3	3
U20 level
Event	1st	2nd	3rd
World U20 Championships	1	0	0
World Team Championships (U20)	2	1	1
Pan American U20 Championships	1	0	0
Pan American Cup (U20)	2	0	0
South American U20 Championships	1	0	0
South American U18 Championships	1	0	0
South American Race Walking Championships	3	0	0
Total	11	1	1
Senior level
World Championships
Gold medal – first place	2017 London	20 km walk
Pan American Championships
Bronze medal – third place	2026 Medellín	Half marathon walk
Pan American Cup
Gold medal – first place	2017 Lima	20 km walk
Gold medal – first place	2021 Guayaquil	20 km walk
Central American and Caribbean Games
Gold medal – first place	2018 Barranquilla	20 km walk
Silver medal – second place	2014 Veracruz	20 km walk
Silver medal – second place	2026 Santo Domingo	Half marathon walk
South American Games
Gold medal – first place	2014 Santiago	20,000 m walk
South American Championships
Silver medal – second place	2013 Cartagena	20,000 m walk
Bolivarian Games
Bronze medal – third place	2017 Santa Marta	20 km walk
Bronze medal – third place	2025 Lima-Ayacucho	Half marathon walk
U20 level
World U20 Championships
Gold medal – first place	2012 Barcelona	10,000 m walk
World Team Championships (U20)
Gold medal – first place	2010 Chihuahua	10 km walk
Gold medal – first place	2012 Saransk	10 km walk
Silver medal – second place	2012 Saransk	10 km walk (team)
Bronze medal – third place	2010 Chihuahua	10 km walk (team)
Pan American U20 Championships
Gold medal – first place	2011 Miramar	10,000 m walk
Pan American Cup (U20)
Gold medal – first place	2011 Envigado	10 km walk
Gold medal – first place	2011 Envigado	10 km walk (team)
South American U20 Championships
Gold medal – first place	2011 Medellín	10,000 m walk
South American U18 Championships
Gold medal – first place	2010 Santiago	10,000 m walk
South American Race Walking Championships
Gold medal – first place	2010 Cochabamba	10 km walk (U18)
Gold medal – first place	2012 Salinas	10 km walk (U20)
Gold medal – first place	2012 Salinas	10 km walk (team U20)

Éider Orlando Arévalo Truque (born 9 March 1993) is a Colombian race walker.

He competed in the 20 km walk at the 2012 Summer Olympics, where he placed 20th. He represented Colombia at the 2020 Summer Olympics.

== Personal bests ==
Event	Result	Venue	Date
Track walk
5,000 m	21:47.14 min A	Puebla, Mexico	25 October 2009
10,000 m	39:36.80 min NR	Armenia, Colombia	2 August 2025
20,000 m	1:22:11.1 hrs (ht)	Santiago, Chile	15 March 2014
Road walk
10 km	40:11 min	Valley Cottage, United States	14 September 2014
20 km	1:18:53 hrs NR	London, United Kingdom	13 August 2017
35 km	2:25:21 hrs NR	Eugene, United States	24 July 2022
Half marathon walk	1:23:59 hrs NR	Poděbrady, Czech Republic	8 May 2026

== International competitions ==
Year	Competition	Venue	Position	Event	Notes
Representing Colombia
2010	South American Race Walking Championships (U18)	Cochabamba, Bolivia	1st	10 km walk	43:35
2010	World Team Championships (U20)	Chihuahua, Mexico	1st	10 km walk	42:13
2010	World Team Championships (U20)	Chihuahua, Mexico	3rd	10 km walk (team)	9 pts
2010	Youth Olympic Games	Singapore	—N/a	10,000 m walk	DQ
2010	South American U18 Championships	Santiago, Chile	1st	10,000 m walk	40:27.95 CR
2011	Pan American Cup (U20)	Envigado, Colombia	1st	10 km walk	40:40
2011	Pan American Cup (U20)	Envigado, Colombia	1st	10 km walk (team)	3 Pts
2011	Pan American U20 Championships	Miramar, United States	1st	10,000 m walk	41:29.81
2011	South American U20 Championships	Medellín, Colombia	1st	10,000 m track walk	39:56.01 CR, NU20R
2012	South American Race Walking Championships (U20)	Salinas, Ecuador	1st	10 km walk	43:24
2012	South American Race Walking Championships (U20)	Salinas, Ecuador	1st	10 km walk (team)	3 pts
2012	World Team Championships (U20)	Saransk, Russia	1st	10 km walk	41:17
2012	World Team Championships (U20)	Saransk, Russia	2nd	10 km walk (team)	10 pts
2012	World U20 Championships	Barcelona, Spain	1st	10,000 m walk	40:09.74 WU20L
2012	Olympic Games	London, United Kingdom	20th	20 km walk	1:22:00
2013	South American Championships	Cartagena, Colombia	2nd	20,000 m walk	1:24:36.23
2013	World Championships	Moscow, Russia	—N/a	20 km walk	DNF
2014	South American Games	Santiago, Chile	1st	20,000 m walk	1:22:11.1 GR
2014	World Team Championships	Taicang, China	—N/a	20 km walk	DQ
2014	Central American and Caribbean Games	Xalapa, Mexico	2nd	20 km walk	1:26:03 A
2015	Pan American Games	Toronto, Canada	5th	20 km walk	1:25:50
2015	World Championships	Beijing, China	7th	20 km walk	1:21:13
2016	World Team Championships	Rome, Italy	—N/a	20 km walk	DNF
2016	World Team Championships	Rome, Italy	13th	20 km walk (team)	154 pts
2016	Olympic Games	Rio de Janeiro, Brazil	15th	20 km walk	1:21:36
2017	Pan American Cup	Lima, Peru	1st	20 km walk	1:21:01
2017	World Championships	London, United Kingdom	1st	20 km walk	1:18:53 NR
2017	Bolivarian Games	Santa Marta, Colombia	3rd	20 km walk	1:27:47
2018	World Team Championships	Taicang, China	12th	20 km walk	1:23:46
2018	Central American and Caribbean Games	Barranquilla, Colombia	1st	20 km walk	1:26:42
2019	South American Championships	Lima, Peru	—N/a	20,000 m walk	DNF
2019	Pan American Games	Lima, Peru	—N/a	20 km walk	DNF
2021	Pan American Cup	Guayaquil, Ecuador	1st	20 km walk	1:21:37
2021	Olympic Games	Sapporo, Japan	18th	20 km walk	1:24:10
2022	World Team Championships	Muscat, Oman	—N/a	20 km walk	DNF
2022	World Championships	Eugene, United States	22nd	20 km walk	1:24:32
2022	World Championships	Eugene, United States	8th	35 km walk	2:25:21 NR
2022	South American Games	Asunción, Paraguay	4th	20 km walk	1:27:00
2023	World Championships	Budapest, Hungary	26th	20 km walk	1:21:55
2023	World Championships	Budapest, Hungary	—N/a	35 km walk	DNF
2025	Bolivarian Games	Lima, Peru	3rd	Half marathon walk	1:26:39 NR
2026	World Team Championships	Brasília, Brazil	18th	Half marathon walk	1:30:16
2026	World Team Championships	Brasília, Brazil	9th	Half marathon walk (team)	112 pts
2026	Pan American Championships	Medellín, Colombia	3rd	Half marathon walk	1:28:24
2026	Central American and Caribbean Games	Santo Domingo, Dominican Republic	2nd	Half marathon walk	1:31:28
