= Jhon Perlaza =

Colombian sprinter (born 1994)

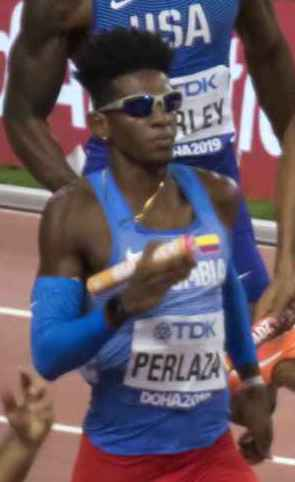
- Perlaza in 2019

Personal information
- Full name: Jhon Alejandro Perlaza Zapata
- Born: 26 August 1994 (age 32) Cali, Colombia
- Height: 1.80 m (5 ft 11 in)
- Weight: 62 kg (137 lb)

Sport
- Country: Colombia
- Sport: Athletics
- College team: Liberty University
Medal record
Representing Colombia
Men's athletics
Pan American Games
| Gold medal – first place | 2019 Lima | 4×400 m relay |
Ibero-American Championships
| Gold medal – first place | 2016 Rio de Janeiro | 4×400 m relay |
| Silver medal – second place | 2024 Cuiabá | 4×400 m relay |
Pan American U20 Championships
| Bronze medal – third place | 2013 Medellín | 400 m |

Jhon Alejandro Perlaza Zapata (born 26 August 1994 in Cali) is a Colombian sprinter. He competed in the men's 4 × 400 metres relay at the 2016 Summer Olympics. He competed at the 2020 Summer Olympics.
