= Luis Fernando López (race walker) =

Colombian race walker (born 1979)

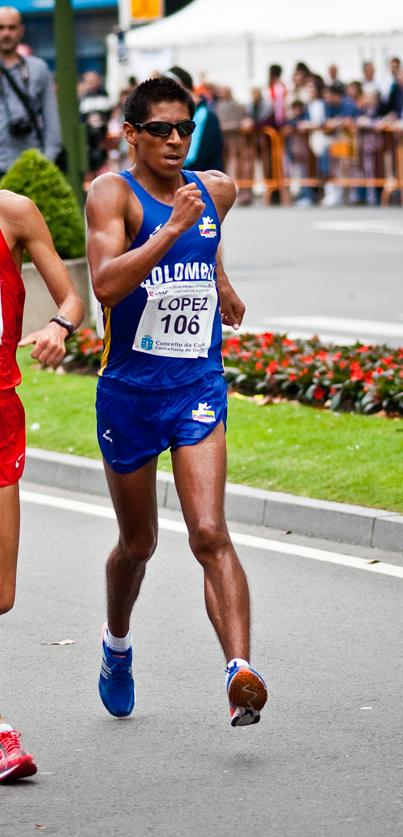

Personal information
- Full name: Luis Fernando López Erazo
- Born: 3 June 1979 (age 47) San Juan de Pasto, Nariño, Colombia
- Height: 1.7 m (5 ft 7 in)
- Weight: 60 kg (130 lb)

Sport
- Country: Colombia
- Sport: Athletics
- Event: Race walking

Achievements and titles
- Olympic finals: 2004 Summer Olympics; 2008 Summer Olympics; 2012 Summer Olympics; 2016 Summer Olympics
Medal record
Representing Colombia
Men's athletics
World Championships
Gold medal – first place	2011 Daegu	20 km walk
Pan American Games
Bronze medal – third place	2011 Guadalajara	20 km walk
South American Championships
Gold medal – first place	2009 Lima	20,000 m walk
Bronze medal – third place	2005 Cali	20 km walk
Bolivarian Games
Gold medal – first place	2009 Sucre	20 km walk

Luis Fernando López Erazo (born 3 June 1979) is a Colombian race walker.

López was introduced to athletics by his father, who was also a competitive race walker. His uncle, Marcelino Pastrana, was a former Colombian national champion at the 800 m, and later became his coach.

When he won the gold medal at the 2011 World Championships, it was the first athletics world championship medal to be won by a Colombian. He was declared the silver medalist in a photo finish at the 2017 Pan American Race Walking Cup 50 kilometers race walk, walking the same time as winner Claudio Villanueva, his personal best 3:51:35.

== Personal bests ==
=== Track walk ===
- 10,000 m: 40:33.87 min – Catania, Italy, 6 December 2003
- 20,000 m: 1:20:53.6 hrs (ht) – Lima, Peru, 21 June 2009

=== Road walk ===
- 10 km: 38:10 min – Beijing, China, 18 September 2010
- 20 km: 1:20:03 hrs – Berlin, Germany, 15 August 2009
- 50 km: 3:51:35 hrs – Lima, Peru, 14 May 2017

== Achievements ==
Year	Competition	Venue	Position	Event	Notes
Representing the Colombia
1998	South American Junior Championships	Córdoba, Argentina	2nd	10,000 m	44:18.66
2001	South American Race Walking Championships/ Pan American Race Walking Cup	Cuenca, Ecuador	—	20 km road walk	DQ
2003	Pan American Race Walking Cup	Chula Vista, United States	9th	20 km road walk	1:27:15
2003	Pan American Games	Santo Domingo, Dominican Republic	4th	20 km	1:27:32
2004	South American Race Walking Championships	Los Ángeles, Chile	2nd	20 km road walk	1:22:52
2004	World Race Walking Cup	Naumburg, Germany	38th	20 km road walk	1:24:00
2004	Olympic Games	Athens, Greece	24th	20 km	1:26:34
2005	Pan American Race Walking Cup	Lima, Peru	2nd	20 km	1:20:26
2005	South American Championships	Cali, Colombia	3rd	20,000 m	1:23:43.2
2005	World Championships	Helsinki, Finland	12th	20 km	1:22:28
2005	Bolivarian Games	Armenia, Colombia	4th	20 km road walk	1:25:01
2006	South American Race Walking Championships	Cochabamba, Bolivia	2nd	20 km road walk	1:27:16
2006	World Race Walking Cup	A Coruña, Spain	—	20 km road walk	DQ
2006	Central American and Caribbean Games	Cartagena, Colombia	1st	20 km	1:24:20
2007	Pan American Race Walking Cup	Balneário Camboriú, Brazil	3rd	20 km	1:25:25
2007	Pan American Games	Rio de Janeiro, Brazil	—	20 km	DQ
2007	World Championships	Osaka, Japan	22nd	20 km	1:27:22
2008	South American Race Walking Championships	Cuenca, Ecuador	1st	20 km road walk	1:24:38
2008	World Race Walking Cup	Cheboksary, Russia	23rd	20 km road walk	1:22:25
2008	Olympic Games	Beijing, China	9th	20 km	1:20:59
2009	Pan American Race Walking Cup	San Salvador, El Salvador	1st	20 km	1:22:18
2009	South American Championships	Lima, Peru	1st	20,000 m	1:20:53.6
2009	World Championships	Berlin, Germany	5th	20 km	1:20:03
2009	Bolivarian Games	Sucre, Bolivia	1st	20 km	1:28.09 A
2010	World Race Walking Cup	Chihuahua, Mexico	4th	20 km road walk	1:23:11
2010	Central American and Caribbean Games	Mayagüez, Puerto Rico	2nd	20 km	1:22:55
2011	Pan American Race Walking Cup	Envigado, Colombia	1st	20 km road walk	1:25:04
2011	World Championships	Daegu, South Korea	1st	20 km	1:20:38
2011	Pan American Games	Guadalajara, Mexico	3rd	20 km	1:22.51
2012	World Race Walking Cup	Saransk, Russia	49th	20 km road walk	1:26:14
2012	Olympic Games	London, United Kingdom	–	20 km	DQ
2013	Pan American Race Walking Cup	Guatemala City, Guatemala	21st	20 km road walk	1:34:13
2013	World Championships	Moscow, Russia	—	20 km road walk	DNF
2014	World Race Walking Challenge	Chihuahua, Mexico	12th	20 km road walk	1:26:07
2014	World Race Walking Cup	Taicang, China	34th	50 km road walk	4:05:14
2015	World Championships	Beijing, China	20th	50 km	3:55:43
