= Colombian Athletics Federation =

Governing body for the sport of athletics in Colombia

- Federación Colombiana de Atletismo
- Sport: Athletics
- Jurisdiction: Colombia
- Abbreviation: FECODATLE
- Affiliation: World Athletics
- Regional affiliation: Atletismo Sudamericano
- Affiliation date: 1937
- Headquarters: Bogotá
- President: Félix Marrugo
- Vice president: Orlando Ibarra
- (Colombia)

The Colombian Athletics Federation (Spanish: Federación Colombiana de Atletismo, FECODATLE) is the governing body for the sport of athletics in Colombia. Current president is Félix Marrugo.

== History ==
FECODATLE was founded and joined Atletismo Sudamericano in 1937.

== Affiliations ==
FECODATLE is the national member federation for Colombia in the following international organisations:

- World Athletics
- Confederación Sudamericana de Atletismo (Atletismo Sudamericano; South American Athletics Confederation)
- Association of Panamerican Athletics (APA)
- Asociación Iberoamericana de Atletismo (AIA; Ibero-American Athletics Association)
- Central American and Caribbean Athletic Confederation (CACAC)

Moreover, it is part of the following national organisations:

- Colombian Olympic Committee (Spanish: Comité Olímpico Colombiano)

== Members ==

FECODATLE comprises the regional athletic ligas of 30 of the 32 departments, plus the ligas of the capital district and of the armed forces. There a no ligas for the departments of Vaupés and Vichada.

State	Organisation
Amazonas	
Antioquia	Liga de Atletismo de Antioquia
Arauca	Liga de Atletismo de Arauca
Atlántico	Liga de Atletismo del Atlántico
Bolívar	Liga de Atletismo de Bolívar
Boyacá	Liga de Atletismo de Boyacá
Caldas	Liga Caldense de Atletismo
Caquetá	Liga de Atletismo del Caquetá
Casanare	Liga de Atletismo de Casanare
Cauca	Liga de Atletismo del Cauca
Cesar	Liga de Atletismo del Cesar
Chocó	Liga de Atletismo del Chocó
Córdoba	Liga de Atletismo de Córdoba
Cundinamarca	Liga de Atletismo de Cundinamarca
Distrito Capital	Liga de Atletismo de Bogotá
Guainía	
Guaviare	Liga de Atletismo del Guaviare
Huila	Liga de Atletismo del Huila
La Guajira	Liga de Atletismo de La Guajira
Magdalena	Liga de Atletismo del Magdalena
Meta	Liga De Atletismo del Meta
Nariño	Liga de Atletismo de Nariño
Norte de Santander	Liga Nortesantandereana de Atletismo
Putumayo	
Quindío	Liga Quindíana De Atletismo
Risaralda	Liga de Atletismo de Risaralda
San Andrés	Liga de Atletismo "San Andres"
Santander	Liga Santandereana De Atletismo
Sucre	Liga de Atletismo de Sucre
Tolima	Liga De Atletismo Del Tolima
Valle del Cauca	Liga Vallecaucana de Atletismo
Federación Deportiva Militar	Liga Militar de Atletismo

== Kit suppliers ==
Colombia's kits are currently supplied by Nike.

== National records ==
FECODATLE maintains the Colombian records in athletics.
