= Dominican Republic at the 2025 World Athletics Championships =

- Flag of Dominican Republic
- WA code: DOM

in Tokyo, Japan 13 September 2025 – 21 September 2025
- Competitors: 4 (2 men and 2 women) in 5 events
- Medals Ranked 27th: Gold 0 Silver 1 Bronze 0 Total 1

World Athletics Championships appearances
- 1983; 1987; 1991; 1993; 1995; 1997; 1999; 2001; 2003; 2005; 2007; 2009; 2011; 2013; 2015; 2017; 2019; 2022; 2023; 2025

The Dominican Republic competed at the 2025 World Athletics Championships in Tokyo, Japan, from 13 to 21 September 2025.

== Medallists ==
Medal	Athlete	Event	Date
Silver	Marileidy Paulino	Women's 400 metres	September 18

== Results ==
Dominican Republic entered 4 athletes.

Key

- Q = Qualified for the next round
- q = Qualified for the next round as a fastest loser or, in field events, by position without achieving the qualifying target
- NR = National record
- PB = Personal best
- SB = Season best
- N/A = Round not applicable for the event

=== Men ===
Track and road events

Athlete	Event	Heat		Semifinal		Final	
Athlete	Event	Result	Rank	Result	Rank	Result	Rank
Lidio Andrés Feliz	200 metres	20.63	35	Did not advance			
Alexander Ogando	200 metres	20.10	8 Q	19.98	7 Q	20.01	6
Alexander Ogando	400 metres	45.59	38	Did not advance			

=== Women ===
Track and road events

Athlete	Event	Heat		Semifinal		Final	
Athlete	Event	Result	Rank	Result	Rank	Result	Rank
Liranyi Alonso	100 metres	11.26	25 Q	11.16	16	Did not advance	
Liranyi Alonso	200 metres	Did not start		Did not advance			
Marileidy Paulino	400 metres	49.85	4 Q	49.82	7 Q	47.98 NR	2nd place, silver medalist(s)
