= Dominican Republic at the 2022 World Athletics Championships =

- Flag of the Dominican Republic
- WA code: DOM
- National federation: Athletics Federation of the Dominican Republic
- Website: fedomatle.org

in Eugene, United States 15 July 2022 – 24 July 2022
- Competitors: 11 (7 men and 4 women) in 6 events
- Medals Ranked 13th: Gold 1 Silver 1 Bronze 0 Total 2

World Athletics Championships appearances
- 1983; 1987; 1991; 1993; 1995; 1997; 1999; 2001; 2003; 2005; 2007; 2009; 2011; 2013; 2015; 2017; 2019; 2022; 2023; 2025

The Dominican Republic competed at the 2022 World Athletics Championships in Eugene, Oregon, from 15 to 24 July.

== Medalists ==
Medal	Athlete	Event	Date
Gold	Fiordaliza Cofil; Lidio Andrés Feliz; Marileidy Paulino; Alexander Ogando	Mixed 4 x 400 m relay	July 15
Silver	Marileidy Paulino	Women's 400 metres	July 22

== Team ==
The Dominican Republic was coached by Félix Sánchez, José Ludwig Rubio, and Yaseen Pérez and was composed by 11 athletes (7 men and 4 women). The two times Olympic medallist Luguelín Santos announced he wouldn't be able to participate because he contracted COVID-19.

== Results ==
Key

- Q = Qualified for the next round
- q = Qualified for the next round as a fastest loser or, in field events, by position without achieving the qualifying target
- NR = National record
- PB = Personal best
- SB = Season best
- N/A = Round not applicable for the event

=== Men ===
Track and road events

Athlete	Event	Heat		Semi-final		Final	
Athlete	Event	Result	Rank	Result	Rank	Result	Rank
Yancarlos Martínez	200 metres	20.13	7 q	20.21 SB	10	Did not advance	
Alexander Ogando	200 metres	20.01 NR	3 Q	19.91 NR	5 Q	19.93	5
Lidio Andrés Feliz	400 metres	45.87	17 Q	46.19	22	Did not advance	
Juander Santos	400 metres hurdles	58.80	35	Did not advance			
Wilber Encarnación; Lidio Andrés Feliz; Robert King; Yeral Núñez; Alexander Ogando	4 × 400 metres relay	DNS		Did not advance			

=== Women ===
Track and road events

Athlete	Event	Heat		Semi-final		Final	
Athlete	Event	Result	Rank	Result	Rank	Result	Rank
Marileidy Paulino	400 metres	50.76	5 Q	49.98	2 Q	49.60	2nd place, silver medalist(s)
Fiordaliza Cofil	400 metres	51.19	11 Q	50.14 SB	5 Q	50.57	6

Field events

Athlete	Event	Qualification		Final	
Athlete	Event	Distance	Position	Distance	Position
Ana José Tima	Triple jump	14.52 NR	3 Q	14.13	10

=== Mixed ===
Athlete	Event	Heat		Final	
Athlete	Event	Result	Rank	Result	Rank
Lidio Andrés Feliz; Marileidy Paulino; Alexander Ogando; Fiordaliza Cofil	4 × 400 m relay	3:13.22 SB	3 Q	3:09.82 WL, NR	1st place, gold medalist(s)
