= Fiordaliza Cofil =

Dominican Republic sprinter

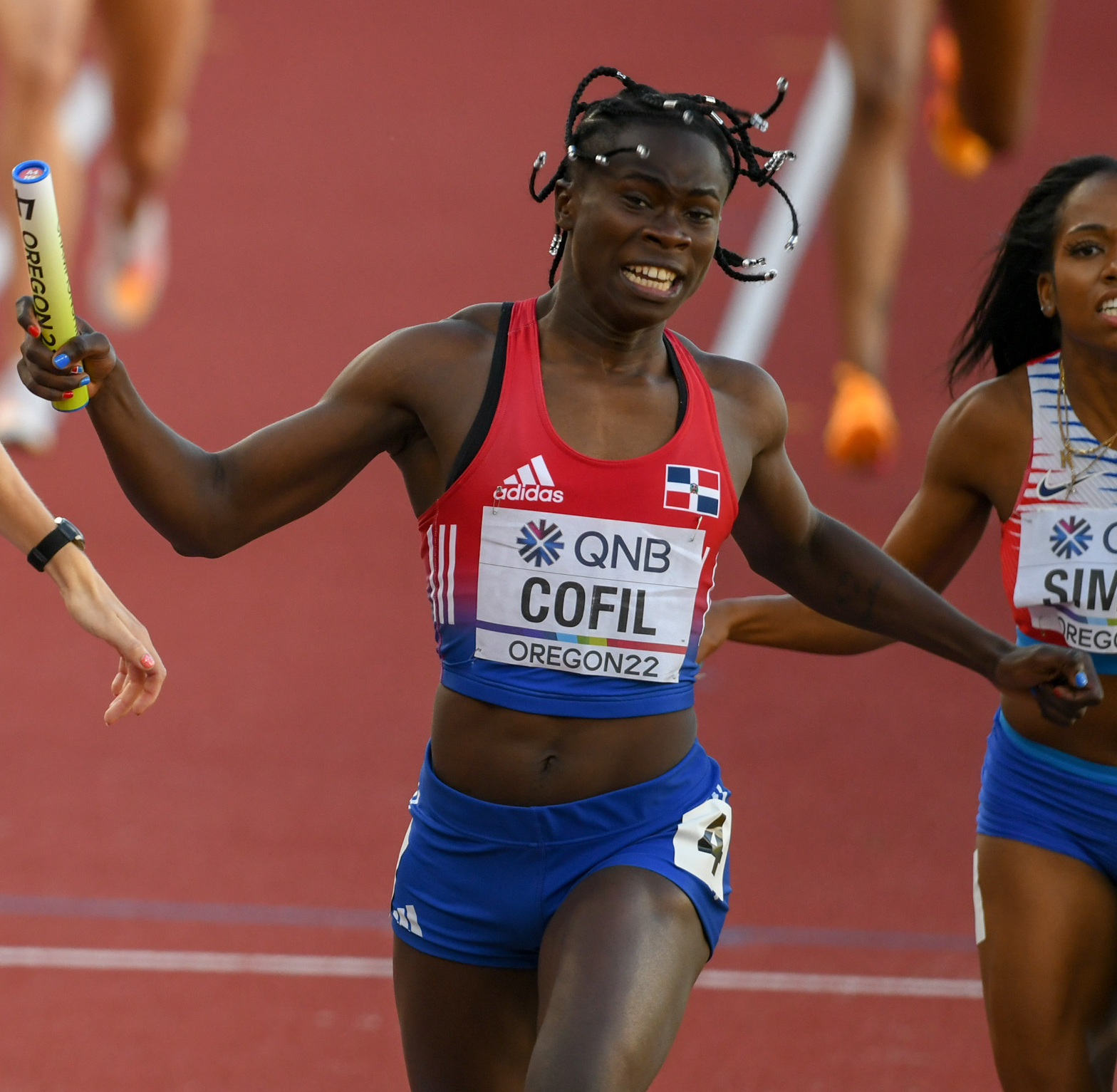
- Cofil at the 2022 World Championships in Eugene

Personal information
- Nationality: Dominican
- Born: 27 October 2000 (age 25)

Sport
- Country: Dominican Republic
- Sport: Track and Field
- Event: Sprint

Achievements and titles
- Personal bests: 100 m: 11.16 (2022); 200 m: 22.87 (2022); 400 m: 49.80 (2022)
Medal record
Women's athletics
Representing Dominican Republic
World Championships
Gold medal – first place	2022 Eugene	Mixed relay
Pan American Championships
Gold medal – first place	2026 Medellín	4×100 m relay
Gold medal – first place	2026 Medellín	4×100 m mixed relay
Ibero-American Championships
Gold medal – first place	2022 La Nucia	4×100 m relay
Gold medal – first place	2026 Lima	4×400 m relay
Gold medal – first place	2026 Lima	Mixed relay
Silver medal – second place	2022 La Nucia	400 m
Bronze medal – third place	2022 La Nucia	4×400 m relay
Central American and Caribbean Games
Silver medal – second place	2018 Barranquilla	400 m
Junior Pan American Games
Gold medal – first place	2021 Cali-Valle	400 m
Bronze medal – third place	2021 Cali-Valle	200 m
Bronze medal – third place	2021 Cali-Valle	Mixed relay
NACAC U23 Championships
Gold medal – first place	2021 San José	200 m
Bronze medal – third place	2021 San José	400 m

Fiordaliza Cofil (born 27 October 2000) is an athlete from the Dominican Republic, of a Haitian background, who competes as a sprinter. She won the gold medal in the mixed 4 × 400 metres relay at the 2022 World Athletics Championships. Cofil holds Dominican Republic records in the 100 metres, as well as the women's and mixed 4 × 400 m relay.

At the 2022 World Championships in Eugene, Oregon, Cofil ran the anchor leg of the mixed 4 × 400 m relay and chased down American Kennedy Simon to clinch only the third ever gold medal at the Games for her country (alongside Lidio Andrés Feliz, Marileidy Paulino and Alexander Ogando).

In 2023 World Athletics disqualified her from competing at the 2023 World Athletics Championships in Budapest under the DSD Rules due to naturally occurring high levels of testosterone. She underwent medical treatment to lower her levels and returned in 2024 in the 100 and 200 metres.

She ran as part of the 4 × 100 m relay team at the 2024 World Relays Championships in Nassau, Bahamas.

== Achievements ==
=== International competitions ===
Representing Dominican Republic
Year	Competition	Venue	Position	Event	Time
2018	World U20 Championships	Tampere, Finland	14th (sf)	400 m	53.94
2018	World U20 Championships	Tampere, Finland	7th	4 × 400 m relay	3:34.09 NR
2018	CAC Games	Barranquilla, Colombia	2nd	400 m	52.72 PB
2018	CAC Games	Barranquilla, Colombia	4th	4 × 400 m relay	3:33.64
2021	NACAC U23 Championships	San José, Costa Rica	1st	200 m	23.89
2021	NACAC U23 Championships	San José, Costa Rica	3rd	400 m	53.83
2021	Pan American U23 Games	Cali, Colombia	3rd	200 m	23.46
2021	Pan American U23 Games	Cali, Colombia	1st	400 m	52.10
2021	Pan American U23 Games	Cali, Colombia	4th	4 × 100 m relay	44.86
2021	Pan American U23 Games	Cali, Colombia	– (f)	4 × 400 m relay	DQ
2021	Pan American U23 Games	Cali, Colombia	3rd	4 × 400 m mixed	3:28.28
2022	Ibero-American Championships	La Nucia, Spain	2nd	400 m	50.64 PB
2022	Ibero-American Championships	La Nucia, Spain	1st	4 × 100 m relay	43.81 SB
2022	Ibero-American Championships	La Nucia, Spain	3rd	4 × 400 m relay	3:33.41 SB
2022	World Championships	Eugene, OR, United States	6th	400 m	50.57
2022	World Championships	Eugene, OR, United States	1st	4 × 400 m mixed	3:09.82 WL NR

=== Circuit wins ===
- Diamond League
  - 2022 (400 m): Brussels Memorial Van Damme

=== Personal bests ===
- 100 metres – 11.16 (+0.8 m/s, Santo Domingo June 2022) NR
- 200 metres – 22.87 (+1.0 m/s, Santo Domingo June 2022)
- 400 metres – 49.80 (Brussels September 2022)
