= Dominican Republic at the 2015 World Championships in Athletics =

- WA code: DOM

in Beijing
- Competitors: 6
- Medals: Gold 0 Silver 0 Bronze 0 Total 0

World Championships in Athletics appearances
- 1983; 1987; 1991; 1993; 1995; 1997; 1999; 2001; 2003; 2005; 2007; 2009; 2011; 2013; 2015; 2017; 2019; 2022; 2023; 2025

Dominican Republic competed at the 2015 World Championships in Athletics in Beijing, China, from 22 to 30 August 2015.

== Results ==
(q – qualified, NM – no mark, SB – season best)

=== Men ===
Athlete	Event	Heats		Semifinals		Final	
Athlete	Event	Time	Rank	Time	Rank	Time	Rank
Yancarlos Martínez	100 metres	10.19	28	did not advance			
Yancarlos Martínez	200 metres	20.34	19 Q	20.31	14	did not advance	
Luguelín Santos	400 metres	44.62	11 Q	44.26 NR	3 Q	44.11 NR	4
Gustavo Cuesta	400 metres	45.59	35	did not advance			
Gustavo Cuesta; Juander Santos; Luguelín Santos; Yon Soriano	4 × 400 metres relay	3:00.15 NR	10	—N/a		did not advance	

=== Women ===
Athlete	Event	Heats		Semifinals		Final	
Athlete	Event	Time	Rank	Time	Rank	Time	Rank
LaVonne Idlette	100 metres hurdles	13.70	33	did not advance			
