= Dominican Republic at the 2023 World Athletics Championships =

- Flag of Dominican Republic
- WA code: DOM

in Budapest, Hungary 19 August 2023 – 27 August 2023
- Competitors: 8 (3 men and 5 women)
- Medals Ranked 18th: Gold 1 Silver 0 Bronze 0 Total 1

World Athletics Championships appearances
- 1983; 1987; 1991; 1993; 1995; 1997; 1999; 2001; 2003; 2005; 2007; 2009; 2011; 2013; 2015; 2017; 2019; 2022; 2023

The Dominican Republic competed at the 2023 World Athletics Championships in Budapest, Hungary, from 19 to 27 August 2023.

== Medalists ==
Medal	Athlete	Event	Date
Gold	Marileidy Paulino	Women's 400 metres	August 23

== Results ==
Dominican Republic entered 8 athletes.

Key

- Q = Qualified for the next round
- q = Qualified for the next round as a fastest loser or, in field events, by position without achieving the qualifying target
- NR = National record
- PB = Personal best
- SB = Season best
- N/A = Round not applicable for the event

=== Men ===
Track and road events

Athlete	Event	Heat		Semifinal		Final	
Athlete	Event	Result	Rank	Result	Rank	Result	Rank
Alexander Ogando	200 metres	20.14	2 Q	20.02	2 Q	20.23	7

=== Women ===
Track and road events

Athlete	Event	Heat		Semifinal		Final	
Athlete	Event	Result	Rank	Result	Rank	Result	Rank
Marileidy Paulino	400 metres	49.90	1 Q	49.54	1 Q	48.76 NR	1st place, gold medalist(s)

=== Mixed ===
Track events

Athlete	Event	Heat		Final	
Athlete	Event	Result	Rank	Result	Rank
	4 × 400 metres relay	Did not start			
