= 2022 Ibero-American Championships in Athletics =

XIX Ibero-American Championships in Athletics
- Dates: May 20–22
- Host city: La Nucia/Torrevieja, Spain
- Venue: Estadi Olímpic Camilo Cano
- Level: Senior
- Events: 44 (22 men, 22 women)
- Participation: 395 athletes from 23 nations

The 19th Ibero-American Championships in Athletics were held at the Estadi Olímpic Camilo Cano in Spain in La Nucía (most events) and Torrevieja (half marathon), between May 20 and 22, 2022. The competition was originally scheduled to take place in 2020 in Santa Cruz de Tenerife but had to be cancelled due to the COVID-19 pandemic.

== Medal summary ==
=== Men ===
Event	Gold		Silver		Bronze	
100 metres (wind: +0.1 m/s)	Shainer Reginfo; Cuba	10.15	Felipe Bardi; Brazil	10.26	Franco Florio; Argentina	10.31 SB
200 metres (wind: –2.1 m/s)	Alexander Ogando; Dominican Republic	20.27	Yancarlos Martínez; Dominican Republic	20.60 SB	Shainer Reginfo; Cuba	21.01
400 metres	Lidio Andrés Feliz; Dominican Republic	44.64 CR	Luguelín Santos; Dominican Republic	45.50 SB	Elián Larregina; Argentina	45.78 NR
800 metres	Álvaro de Arriba; Spain	1:45.19 SB	José Maita; Venezuela	1:46.22 PB	José Carlos Pinto; Portugal	1:46.61 PB
1500 metres	Isaac Nader; Portugal	3:43.86	José Zabala; Argentina	3:44.55	Pol Moya; Andorra	3:44.64 SB
5000 metres	Carlos Mayo; Spain	13:51.12 SB	Carlos Díaz; Chile	13:51.97	Marcos Molina; Argentina	13:52.50
Half marathon	Luis Ostos; Peru	1:04:46	Jesús Poblete; Argentina	1:04:47	Jorge Blanco; Spain	1:05:26 SB
110 metres hurdles (wind: +0.3 m/s)	Rafael Pereira; Brazil	13.47	Daniel Cisneros; Spain	13.53 (13.526) PB	Eduardo de Deus; Brazil	13.53 (13.530)
400 metres hurdles	Gerald Drummond; Costa Rica	48.87 NR	Juander Santos; Dominican Republic	49.74 SB	Jesús Delgado; Spain	49.82 SB
3000 metres steeplechase	Gonzalo Parra; Spain	8:34.85 SB	Nahuel Carabaña; Andorra	8:35.19 NR	Marcos Molina; Argentina	8:35.40 SB
4 × 100 metres relay	Spain; Bernat Canet; Jesús Gómez; Daniel Rodríguez; Sergio López	39.03 SB	Dominican Republic; Christopher Valdez; Alexander Ogando; José González; Yancarlos Martínez	39.19 SB	Brazil; Gabriel Luiz Boza; Felipe Bardi dos Santos; Erik Cardoso; Lucas da Silva	39.32 SB
4 × 400 metres relay	Dominican Republic; Robert King; Alexander Ogando; Luguelín Santos; Lidio Feliz	3:00.98 SB	Spain; Iñaki Cañal; Samuel García; Oscar Husillos; Manuel Guijarro	3:04.05 SB	Portugal; João Coelho; José Carlos Pinto; Ricardo dos Santos; Mauro Pereira	3:07.23 SB
10,000 metres track walk	Álvaro Martín; Spain	39:24.20 CR	Caio Bonfim; Brazil	39:57.59 PB	César Rodríguez; Peru	40:13.10 SB
High jump	Edgar Rivera; Mexico	2.26 m SB	Thiago Moura; Brazil	2.26 m	Fernando Ferreira; Brazil	2.21 m
Pole vault	Didac Salas; Spain	5.40 m SB	Rubem Miranda; Portugal	5.35 m SB	Germán Chiaraviglio; Argentina	5.30 m SB
Long jump	Eusebio Cáceres; Spain	8.05 m (+0.9)	Maykel Massó; Cuba	8.03 m (+0.9)	Héctor Santos; Spain	7.97 m (+0.7)
Triple jump	Lázaro Martínez; Cuba	17.30 m CR	Marcos Ruiz; Spain	16.94 m PB	Tiago Luis Pereira; Portugal	16.71 m SB
Shot put	Darlan Romani; Brazil	21.70 m CR	Welington Morais; Brazil	20.78 m PB	Tsanko Arnaudov; Portugal	20.43 m SB
Discus throw	Lucas Nervi; Chile	60.58 m	Wellinton da Cruz Filho; Brazil	57.09 m	Emanuel Sousa; Portugal	56.68 m
Hammer throw	Javier Cienfuegos; Spain	74.70 m	Gabriel Kehr; Chile	74.61 m	Humberto Mansilla; Chile	73.14 m
Javelin throw	Leandro Ramos; Portugal	81.37 m	Pedro Henrique Rodrigues; Brazil	80.74 m PB	Luiz Mauricio da Silva; Brazil	80.41 m PB
Decathlon	Gerson Izaguirre; Venezuela	7827 pts	Edgar Campré; Portugal	7729 pts	Bruno Comin; Spain	7668 pts SB

=== Women ===
Event	Gold		Silver		Bronze	
100 metres (wind: –0.2 m/s)	Vitória Cristina Rosa; Brazil	11.22	Lorène Bazolo; Portugal	11.36	María Isabel Pérez; Spain	11.48
200 metres (wind: –2.5 m/s)	Vitória Cristina Rosa; Brazil	23.53	Lorène Bazolo; Portugal	23.67	Lorraine Martins; Brazil	23.80
400 metres	Marileidy Paulino; Dominican Republic	49.49 CR	Fiordaliza Cofil; Dominican Republic	50.64 PB	Roxana Gómez; Cuba	51.03 SB
800 metres	Déborah Rodríguez; Uruguay	2:02.53	Daniela García; Spain	2:03.65	Patrícia Silva; Portugal	2:04.23 PB
1500 metres	Solange Pereira; Spain	4:15.87	Agueda Muñoz; Spain	4:16.42	Salomé Afonso; Portugal	4:17.35
5000 metres	Joselyn Brea; Venezuela	16:08.83	Fedra Luna; Argentina	16:09.96	Lucía Rodríguez; Spain	16:10.08 SB
Half marathon	Florencia Borelli; Argentina	1:11:59 CR	Daiana Ocampo; Argentina	1:13:13	Marta Galimany; Spain	1:13:23
100 metres hurdles (wind: +0.5 m/s)	Greisys Roble; Cuba	12.93 PB	Keily Linet Pérez; Cuba	13.01 PB	Paola Vázquez; Puerto Rico	13.05
400 metres hurdles	Melissa Gonzalez; Colombia	54.87 PB	Sara Gallego; Spain	55.56 SB	Grace Claxton; Puerto Rico	55.66 PB
3000 metres steeplechase	Belén Casetta; Argentina	9:29.60 CR	Irene Sánchez-Escribano; Spain	9:37.08 SB	Tatiane Raquel da Silva; Brazil	9:42.06 SB
4 × 100 metres relay	Dominican Republic; Martha Méndez; Marileidy Paulino; Anabel Medina; Fiordaliza Cofil	43.81 SB	Portugal; Patrícia Rodrigues; Rosalina Santos; Olimpia Barbosa; Lorène Bazolo	44.82 SB	Only two finishers, bronze medal was not awarded.	
4 × 400 metres relay	Spain; Berta Segura; Eva Santidrián; Carmen Avilés; Sara Gallego	3:31.72 SB	Brazil; Tábata de Carvalho; Liliane Fernandes; Chayenne da Silva; Tiffani Marinho	3:32.50 SB	Dominican Republic; Mariana Pérez; Evilin del Carmen; Franshina Martínez; Fiordaliza Cofil	3:33.41 SB
10,000 metres track walk	Laura García-Caro; Spain	43:33.72	Kimberly García; Peru	43:41.50	Ana Cabecinha; Portugal	44:23.69
High jump	Marysabel Senyu; Dominican Republic	1.87 m PB	Valdiléia Martins; Brazil	1.84 m SB	Jennifer Rodríguez; Colombia	1.84 m
Pole vault	Monica Clemente; Spain	4.30 m	Juliana Campos; Brazil	4.30 m	Malen Ruiz de Azua; Spain	4.25 m
Long jump	Fátima Diame; Spain	6.65 m SB (+1.9)	Evelise Veiga; Portugal	6.55 m (+2.2)	Yuliana Angulo; Ecuador	6.48 m (0.0)
Triple jump	Leyanis Pérez; Cuba	14.58 PB (–0.4)	Liadagmis Povea; Cuba	14.41 (+0.1)	Ana José Tima; Dominican Republic	14.25 SB (+0.2)
Shot put	Jessica Inchude; Portugal	18.07 m	María Belén Toimil; Spain	17.85 m SB	Rosa Ramírez; Dominican Republic	17.60 m PB
Discus throw	Yaimé Pérez; Cuba	62.06 m	Karen Gallardo; Chile	59.39 m	Andressa de Morais; Brazil	58.33 m
Hammer throw	Laura Redondo; Spain	68.68 m	Mariana Marcelino; Brazil	64.51 m	Mayra Gaviria; Colombia	64.44 m
Javelin throw	Juleisy Angulo; Ecuador	60.91 m NR	Flor Ruiz; Colombia	60.52 m	Jucilene de Lima; Brazil	57.86 m
Heptathlon	Martha Araújo; Colombia	5951 pts PB	Ana Camila Pirelli; Paraguay	5808 pts SB	Alysbeth Félix; Puerto Rico	5666 pts

1. ^{‡} The High jump event was won by Kateryna Tabashnyk from team Ukraine with a mark of 1.90 m. Invited athletes from Ukraine could not aspire to win medals.

=== Medal table ===
Hosts Spain led the medal table with a total of 30 medals with Dominican Republic and Cuba in the second and third place respectively.

* Host nation (Spain)

Rank	Nation	Gold	Silver	Bronze	Total
1	Spain*	14	8	8	30
2	Dominican Republic	6	5	3	14
3	Cuba	5	3	2	10
4	Brazil	4	10	8	22
5	Portugal	3	6	8	17
6	Argentina	2	4	5	11
7	Colombia	2	1	2	5
8	Venezuela	2	1	0	3
9	Chile	1	3	1	5
10	Peru	1	1	1	3
11	Ecuador	1	0	1	2
12	Costa Rica	1	0	0	1
12	Mexico	1	0	0	1
12	Uruguay	1	0	0	1
15	Andorra	0	1	1	2
16	Paraguay	0	1	0	1
17	Puerto Rico	0	0	3	3
Totals (17 entries)		44	44	43	131

== Participating nations ==
A total of 395 athletes from 23 countries participated.

- Andorra (16)
- Argentina (24)
- Bolivia (4)
- Brazil (70)
- Cape Verde (3)
- Chile (24)
- Colombia (16)
- Costa Rica (1)
- Cuba (16)
- Dominican Republic (20)
- Ecuador (20)
- Equatorial Guinea (3)
- Honduras (5)
- Mexico (5)
- Panama (1)
- Paraguay (1)
- Peru (14)
- Portugal (42)
- Puerto Rico (16)
- Spain (64)
- Ukraine (3)
- Uruguay (11)
- Venezuela (16)
