= Dominican Republic at the 2013 World Championships in Athletics =

- WA code: DOM

in Moscow
- Competitors: 10
- Medals: Gold 0 Silver 0 Bronze 1 Total 1

World Championships in Athletics appearances
- 1983; 1987; 1991; 1993; 1995; 1997; 1999; 2001; 2003; 2005; 2007; 2009; 2011; 2013; 2015; 2017; 2019; 2022; 2023

Dominican Republic competed at the 2013 World Championships in Athletics in Moscow, Russia, from 10 to 18 August 2013. A team of 10 athletes was announced to represent the country in the event.

== Medallists ==
The following Dominican competitor won a medal at the Championships

Medal	Name	Event	Date
Bronze	Luguelín Santos	400 metres	13 August

== Results ==
(q – qualified, NM – no mark, SB – season best)

=== Men ===
Athlete	Event	Preliminaries		Heats		Semifinals		Final	
Athlete	Event	Time	Rank	Time	Rank	Time	Rank	Time	Rank
Luguelín Santos	200 metres			21.13	38	did not advance			
Luguelín Santos	400 metres			45.23	8 Q	44.83	5 Q	44.52 SB	3rd place, bronze medalist(s)
Gustavo Cuesta	400 metres			45.93	20 Q	45.93	20	did not advance	
Félix Sánchez	400 metres hurdles			49.20	3 Q	48.10	2 Q SB	48.22	5
Luguelín Santos; Gustavo Cuesta; Felix Sánchez; Arismendy Peguero; Yon Soriano	4 × 400 metres relay			3:03.61	14			did not advance	

=== Women ===
Athlete	Event	Preliminaries		Heats		Semifinals		Final	
Athlete	Event	Time	Rank	Time	Rank	Time	Rank	Time	Rank
Mariely Sanchez	100 metres			11.41	23 Q	11.41	21	did not advance	
Mariely Sanchez	200 metres			23.05	19 q	23.05	15	did not advance	
LaVonne Idlette	100 metres hurdles			13.06	13 Q	12.91	11	did not advance	
Mariely Sanchez; LaVonne Idlette; Fany Chalas; Margarita Manzueta; Marleny Mejía	4 × 100 metres relay			43.28	14 NR			did not advance	
