= Richard Britton (sprinter) =

Grenadian athlete

Personal information
- Full name: Richard Britton
- Born: October 13, 1976 (age 49) Grenada

Achievements and titles
- Personal best: 400m: 48.10

Richard Britton (born October 13, 1976) is a retired Grenadian sprinter and coach specializing in the 400 metres. He represented Grenada as part of its first Olympic 4 × 400 m relay team at the 1996 Summer Olympics.

== Career ==
In 1995, Britton set his 400 m personal best of 48.10 seconds.

At the 1996 Olympics, Britton's 4 × 400 m team was seeded in the fourth heat. He led off in 48.46 seconds, and his team was originally credited with a 3:13.67 time for 6th place before being disqualified.

== Personal life ==
After his athletics career, Britton became a coach. He was the coach of the Grenadan track and field team at the 2010 Central American and Caribbean Games.

In January 2013, Britton helped organize a national athletics school for the Athletics Federation of the Dominican Republic.

On 2 February 2013, the athletics school launched in Bayaguana. Britton was responsible for the school's launch and served as a coach.

Britton coached Dominican triple jumper Ana José Tima to qualify for the 2020 Summer Olympics. He said in Spanish that she had a lot of talent and expected her to improve despite her age of 28 years old.

Britton's son is Malik Britton, a top Dominican volleyball player who has represented the country in international competitions. Malik originally tried athletics before switching to volleyball.

== Competition record ==
Year	Competition	Venue	Position	Event	Notes
Representing Grenada
1996	Olympic Games	Atlanta, United States	–	4 × 400 m	DQ
