= 2023 World Athletics Rankings =

Individual rankings in athletics

2023 IAAF World Rankings
- Organizer: World Athletics
- Edition: 2nd

The 2023 World Athletics Rankings document the best-performing athletes in the sport of athletics, according to World Athletics' individual athlete ranking system. Individual athletes are assigned a points score best on an average of their best recent competition performances. The performance scoring is primarily based on the time or mark of the athlete, with additional points for their placement within the competition, along with some minor modifications based on the conditions. The world rankings are updated each Wednesday.

As of 26 December 2023, the number one ranked male athlete is Armand Duplantis with 1576 points, and the number one ranked female athlete is Faith Kipyegon with 1584 points.

== Overall rankings (top 10) ==
Men (as of 26 December 2023)
#	Athlete	Nation	Event(s)	Points
1	Armand Duplantis	Sweden (SWE)	Pole vault	1576
2	Ryan Crouser	United States (USA)	Shot put	1552
3	Noah Lyles	United States (USA)	100 metres, 200 metres	1548
4	Jakob Ingebrigtsen	Norway (NOR)	1500 metres, 5000 metres	1538
5	Karsten Warholm	Norway (NOR)	400 metres hurdles	1531
6	Lamecha Girma	Ethiopia (ETH)	1500 metres, 3000 metres steeplechase	1508
7	Kelvin Kiptum	Kenya (KEN)	Marathon	1504
8	Grant Holloway	United States (USA)	110 metres hurdles	1490
9	Eliud Kipchoge	Kenya (KEN)	Marathon	1488
10	Letsile Tebogo	Botswana (BOT)	100 metres, 200 metres	1485

Women (as of 26 December 2023)
#	Athlete	Nation	Event(s)	Points
1	Faith Kipyegon	Kenya (KEN)	1500 metres, 5000 metres	1584
2	Shericka Jackson	Jamaica (JAM)	100 metres, 200 metres	1558
3	Femke Bol	Netherlands (NED)	400 metres hurdles	1524
4	Sha'Carri Richardson	United States (USA)	100 metres, 200 metres	1506
5	Gudaf Tsegay	Ethiopia (ETH)	1500 metres, 5000 metres, 10,000 metres, Marathon	1499
6	Tigst Assefa	Ethiopia (ETH)	Marathon	1488
7	Winfred Yavi	Bahrain (BHR)	3000 metres steeplechase	1486
8	Sifan Hassan	Netherlands (NED)	1500 metres, 5000 metres, 10,000 metres, Marathon	1479
9	Yaroslava Mahuchikh	Ukraine (UKR)	High jump	1476
10	Yulimar Rojas	Venezuela (VEN)	Triple jump	1476

== Event rankings (top 10) ==
IAAF World Rankings, as of 26 December 2023.

=== 100 metres ===
Men

#	Athlete	Born	Points
1	(United States) Noah Lyles	18 Jul 1997	1458
2	(United States) Christian Coleman	6 Mar 1996	1448
3	(Kenya) Ferdinand Omanyala	2 Jan 1996	1418
4	(Botswana) Letsile Tebogo	7 Jun 2003	1404
5	(United States) Fred Kerley	7 May 1995	1397
6	(United Kingdom) Zharnel Hughes	13 Jul 1995	1395
7	(South Africa) Akani Simbine	21 Sep 1993	1379
8	(Jamaica) Oblique Seville	16 Mar 2001	1367
9	(Jamaica) Ackeem Blake	21 Jan 2002	1362
10	(United States) Cravont Charleston	2 Jan 1998	1347

Women

#	Athlete	Born	Points
1	(United States) Sha'Carri Richardson	25 Mar 2000	1480
2	(Jamaica) Shericka Jackson	16 Jul 1994	1465
3	(Ivory Coast) Marie Josée Ta Lou	18 Nov 1988	1463
4	(United Kingdom) Dina Asher-Smith	4 Dec 1995	1372
5	(Saint Lucia) Julien Alfred	10 Jun 2001	1367
6	(Jamaica) Shelly-Ann Fraser-Pryce	27 Dec 1986	1358
7	(Jamaica) Elaine Thompson-Herah	28 Jun 1992	1355
8	(Poland) Ewa Swoboda	26 Jul 1997	1351
9	(United States) Twanisha Terry	24 Jan 1999	1348
10	(Jamaica) Natasha Morrison	17 Nov 1992	1347

=== 200 metres ===
Men

#	Athlete	Born	Points
1	(United States) Noah Lyles	18 Jul 1997	1483
2	(United States) Erriyon Knighton	29 Jan 2004	1461
3	(Botswana) Letsile Tebogo	7 Jun 2003	1438
4	(United States) Kenneth Bednarek	14 Oct 1998	1418
5	(United Kingdom) Zharnel Hughes	13 Jul 1995	1416
6	(Canada) Andre De Grasse	10 Nov 1994	1395
7	(Dominican Republic) Alexander Ogando	3 May 2000	1364
8	(United States) Kyree King	9 Jul 1994	1346
9	(Canada) Aaron Brown	27 May 1992	1342
10	(Jamaica) Andrew Hudson	14 Dec 1996	1329

Women

#	Athlete	Born	Points
1	(Jamaica) Shericka Jackson	16 Jul 1994	1521
2	(United States) Gabrielle Thomas	7 Dec 1996	1412
3	(United Kingdom) Daryll Neita	29 Aug 1996	1391
4	(The Bahamas) Anthonique Strachan	22 Aug 1993	1391
5	(Saint Lucia) Julien Alfred	10 Jun 2001	1389
6	(United States) Sha'Carri Richardson	25 Mar 2000	1380
7	(Ivory Coast) Marie Josée Ta Lou	18 Nov 1988	1364
8	(United Kingdom) Dina Asher-Smith	4 Dec 1995	1363
9	(United States) Abby Steiner	24 Nov 1999	1338
10	(United States) Kayla White	14 Sep 1996	1337

=== 400 metres ===
Men

#	Athlete	Born	Points
1	(South Africa) Wayde van Niekerk	15 Jul 1992	1404
2	(United States) Quincy Hall	31 Jul 1998	1399
3	(United States) Vernon Norwood	10 Apr 1992	1397
4	(United Kingdom) Matthew Hudson-Smith	26 Oct 1994	1393
5	(Grenada) Kirani James	1 Sep 1992	1378
6	(Jamaica) Antonio Watson	11 Sep 2001	1372
7	(Zambia) Muzala Samukonga	9 Dec 2002	1359
8	(Jamaica) Rusheen McDonald	17 Aug 1992	1344
9	(The Bahamas) Steven Gardiner	12 Sep 1995	1343
10	(Norway) Håvard Bentdal Ingvaldsen	21 Sep 2002	1340

Women

#	Athlete	Born	Points
1	(Dominican Republic) Marileidy Paulino	25 Oct 1996	1470
2	(Poland) Natalia Kaczmarek	17 Jan 1998	1437
3	(Barbados) Sada Williams	1 Dec 1997	1381
4	(Netherlands) Lieke Klaver	20 Aug 1998	1380
5	(Netherlands) Femke Bol	23 Feb 2000	1372
6	(Republic of Ireland) Rhasidat Adeleke	29 Aug 2002	1359
7	(Jamaica) Candice McLeod	15 Nov 1996	1349
8	(Belgium) Cynthia Bolingo	12 Jan 1993	1338
9	(United States) Shamier Little	20 Mar 1995	1312
10	(United States) Lynna Irby	6 Dec 1998	1312

=== 800 metres ===
Men

#	Athlete	Born	Points
1	(Kenya) Emmanuel Wanyonyi	1 Aug 2004	1449
2	(Canada) Marco Arop	20 Sep 1998	1437
3	(Algeria) Djamel Sedjati	3 May 1999	1386
4	(Algeria) Slimane Moula	25 Feb 1999	1375
5	(Kenya) Wycliffe Kinyamal	2 Jul 1997	1359
6	(United Kingdom) Ben Pattison	15 Dec 2001	1350
7	(France) Yanis Meziane	26 Jan 2002	1337
8	(United Kingdom) Daniel Rowden	9 Sep 1997	1334
9	(United States) Bryce Hoppel	5 Sep 1997	1333
10	(France) Benjamin Robert	4 Jan 1998	1331

Women

#	Athlete	Born	Points
1	(Kenya) Mary Moraa	15 June 2000	1440
2	(United Kingdom) Keely Hodgkinson	3 Mar 2002	1439
3	(Jamaica) Natoya Goule	30 Mar 1991	1364
4	(United States) Athing Mu	8 Jun 2002	1359
5	(Uganda) Halimah Nakaayi	16 Oct 1994	1354
6	(United Kingdom) Jemma Reekie	6 Mar 1998	1349
7	(Australia) Catriona Bisset	1 Mar 1994	1338
8	(United States) Ajee Wilson	8 May 1994	1337
9	(Jamaica) Adelle Tracey	27 May 1993	1327
10	(United States) Nia Akins	7 Jul 1998	1324

=== 1500 metres ===
Men

#	Athlete	Born	Points
1	(Norway) Jakob Ingebrigtsen	19 Sep 2000	1524
2	(United States) Yared Nuguse	1 Jun 1999	1459
3	(United Kingdom) Josh Kerr	8 Oct 1997	1413
4	(Norway) Narve Gilje Nordås	30 Sep 1998	1402
5	(Kenya) Abel Kipsang	22 Nov 1996	1398
6	(Kenya) Reynold Cheruiyot	30 Jul 2004	1397
7	(Spain) Mario García	29 Jun 1999	1386
8	(United Kingdom) Neil Gourley	7 Feb 1995	1373
9	(United Kingdom) George Mills	12 May 1999	1353
10	(France) Azeddine Habz	19 Jul 1993	1352

Women

#	Athlete	Born	Points
1	(Kenya) Faith Kipyegon	10 Jan 1994	1538
2	(Ethiopia) Gudaf Tsegay	23 Jan 1997	1510
3	(United Kingdom) Laura Muir	9 May 1993	1417
4	(Ethiopia) Freweyni Hailu	12 Feb 2001	1401
5	(Republic of Ireland) Ciara Mageean	12 Mar 1992	1396
6	(Kenya) Nelly Chepchirchir	4 Jun 2003	1386
7	(Australia) Jessica Hull	22 Oct 1996	1375
8	(Ethiopia) Birke Haylom	6 Jan 2006	1370
9	(Ethiopia) Hirut Meshesha	20 Jan 2001	1352
10	(United Kingdom) Katie Snowden	9 Mar 1994	1347

=== 5000 metres ===
Men

#	Athlete	Born	Points
1	(Ethiopia) Yomif Kejelcha	1 Aug 1997	1453
2	(Ethiopia) Berihu Aregawi	28 Feb 2001	1430
3	(Spain) Mohamed Katir	17 Feb 1998	1415
4	(Ethiopia) Hagos Gebrhiwet	11 May 1994	1412
5	(Ethiopia) Telahun Haile Bekele	13 May 1999	1409
6	(Norway) Jakob Ingebrigtsen	19 Sep 2000	1405
7	(Ethiopia) Selemon Barega	20 Jan 2000	1375
8	(Kenya) Jacob Krop	4 Jun 2001	1371
9	(Guatemala) Luis Grijalva	10 Apr 1999	1371
10	(United States) Grant Fisher	22 Apr 1997	1353

Women

#	Athlete	Born	Points
1	(Ethiopia) Gudaf Tsegay	23 Jun 1997	1456
2	(Kenya) Faith Kipyegon	10 Jan 1994	1429
3	(Kenya) Beatrice Chebet	5 Mar 2000	1428
4	(Ethiopia) Ejgayehu Taye	10 Feb 2000	1387
5	(Kenya) Lilian Kasait Rengeruk	3 May 1997	1382
6	(Netherlands) Sifan Hassan	1 Jan 1993	1378
7	(Ethiopia) Medina Eisa	3 Jan 2005	1368
8	(Ethiopia) Freweyni Hailu	12 Feb 2001	1362
9	(Kenya) Margaret Kipkemboi	9 Feb 1993	1362
10	(Ethiopia) Lemlem Hailu	25 May 2001	1348

=== 10,000 metres ===
Men

#	Athlete	Born	Points
1	(Uganda) Joshua Cheptegei	12 Sep 1996	1359
2	(Kenya) Daniel Ebenyo	18 Sep 1995	1351
3	(Ethiopia) Selemon Barega	20 Jan 2000	1314
4	(Ethiopia) Berihu Aregawi	28 Feb 2001	1306
5	(Kenya) Benard Kibet	25 Nov 1999	1281
6	(Uganda) Jacob Kiplimo	14 Nov 2000	1274
7	(Canada) Mohammed Ahmed	5 Jan 1991	1267
8	(Kenya) Nicholas Kimeli	29 Sep 1998	1266
9	(Kenya) Stanley Mburu	9 Apr 2000	1255
10	(Burundi) Rodrigue Kwizera	10 Oct 1999	1253

Women

#	Athlete	Born	Points
1	(Ethiopia) Letesenbet Gidey	20 Mar 1998	1382
2	(Ethiopia) Gudaf Tsegay	23 Jun 1997	1367
3	(Ethiopia) Ejgayehu Taye	10 Feb 2000	1339
4	(Netherlands) Sifan Hassan	1 Jan 1993	1325
5	(United States) Alicia Monson	13 May 1998	1321
6	(United Kingdom) Eilish McColgan	25 Nov 1990	1308
7	(Kenya) Irine Jepchumba Kimais	10 Oct 1998	1297
8	(Kenya) Grace Nawowuna	10 Nov 2003	1291
9	(Kenya) Margaret Kipkemboi	9 Feb 1993	1284
10	(Kenya) Agnes Jebet Ngetich	23 Jan 2001	1282

=== 110 & 100 metres hurdles ===
Men

#	Athlete	Born	Points
1	(United States) Grant Holloway	19 Nov 1997	1490
2	(Jamaica) Hansle Parchment	17 Jun 1990	1455
3	(United States) Daniel Roberts	13 Nov 1997	1431
4	(Japan) Shunsuke Izumiya	26 Jan 2000	1417
5	(United States) Freddie Crittenden	3 Aug 1994	1395
6	(Switzerland) Jason Joseph	11 Oct 1998	1394
7	(United States) Jamal Britt	28 Dec 1998	1367
8	(France) Wilhem Belocian	22 Jun 1995	1359
9	(France) Just Kwaou-Mathey	4 Dec 1999	1342
10	(United States) Devon Allen	12 Dec 1994	1334

Women

#	Athlete	Born	Points
1	(Puerto Rico) Jasmine Camacho-Quinn	21 Aug 1996	1450
2	(Nigeria) Tobi Amusan	23 Apr 1997	1434
3	(United States) Kendra Harrison	18 Sep 1992	1428
4	(Jamaica) Danielle Williams	14 Sep 1992	1416
5	(United States) Nia Ali	23 Oct 1988	1385
6	(United States) Alaysha Johnson	20 Jul 1996	1375
7	(The Bahamas) Devynne Charlton	26 Nov 1995	1364
8	(United States) Tia Jones	8 Sep 2000	1353
9	(Jamaica) Megan Tapper	18 Mar 1994	1349
10	(Poland) Pia Skrzyszowska	20 Apr 2001	1342

=== 400 metres hurdles ===
Men

#	Athlete	Born	Points
1	(Norway) Karsten Warholm	28 Feb 1996	1531
2	(United States) Rai Benjamin	27 Jul 1997	1473
3	(British Virgin Islands) Kyron McMaster	3 Jan 1997	1468
4	(Brazil) Alison dos Santos	3 Jun 2000	1426
5	(United States) CJ Allen	14 Feb 1995	1406
6	(United States) Trevor Bassitt	26 Feb 1998	1381
7	(France) Wilfried Happio	22 Sep 1998	1370
8	(Estonia) Rasmus Mägi	4 May 1992	1360
9	(France) Ludvy Vaillant	15 Mar 1995	1357
10	(Jamaica) Roshawn Clarke	1 Jul 2004	1351

Women

#	Athlete	Born	Points
1	(Netherlands) Femke Bol	23 Feb 2000	1514
2	(United States) Shamier Little	20 Mar 1995	1437
3	(Jamaica) Rushell Clayton	18 Oct 1992	1422
4	(Jamaica) Janieve Russell	14 Nov 1993	1382
5	(United States) Anna Cockrell	28 Aug 1997	1359
6	(Jamaica) Andrenette Knight	19 Oct 1996	1356
7	(Italy) Ayomide Folorunso	17 Oct 1996	1353
8	(Bahrain) Kemi Adekoya	16 Jan 1993	1333
9	(United Kingdom) Jessie Knight	15 Jun 1994	1315
10	(Ukraine) Anna Ryzhykova	24 Nov 1989	1307

=== 3000 metres steeplechase ===
Men

#	Athlete	Born	Points
1	(Morocco) Soufiane El Bakkali	7 Jan 1996	1474
2	(Ethiopia) Lamecha Girma	26 Nov 2000	1434
3	(Kenya) Simon Koech	10 Jun 2003	1408
4	(Kenya) Abraham Kibiwot	6 Apr 1996	1399
5	(Ethiopia) Getnet Wale	16 Jul 2000	1363
6	(Ethiopia) Samuel Firewu	3 May 2004	1362
7	(Kenya) Leonard Bett	3 Nov 2000	1359
8	(Japan) Ryuji Miura	21 Feb 2002	1356
9	(New Zealand) Geordie Beamish	24 Oct 1996	1352
10	(Ethiopia) Abrham Sime	7 Nov 2001	1335

Women

#	Athlete	Born	Points
1	(Bahrain) Winfred Yavi	31 Dec 1999	1486
2	(Kenya) Beatrice Chepkoech	6 Jul 1991	1459
3	(Kenya) Faith Cherotich	13 Jul 2004	1418
4	(Kenya) Jackline Chepkoech	3 Oct 2003	1403
5	(Ethiopia) Sembo Almayew	24 Jan 2005	1399
6	(Ethiopia) Zerfe Wondemagegn	26 Oct 2002	1394
7	(Albania) Luiza Gega	5 Nov 1988	1362
8	(Slovenia) Maruša Mišmaš-Zrimšek	24 Oct 1994	1359
9	(France) Alice Finot	9 Feb 1991	1343
10	(Uganda) Peruth Chemutai	10 Jul 1999	1340

=== High jump ===
Men

#	Athlete	Born	Points
1	(United States) JuVaughn Harrison	30 Apr 1999	1434
2	(Qatar) Mutaz Essa Barshim	24 Jun 1991	1420
3	(Italy) Gianmarco Tamberi	1 Jun 1992	1382
4	(South Korea) Woo Sang-hyeok	23 Apr 1996	1376
5	(New Zealand) Hamish Kerr	17 Aug 1996	1331
6	(Germany) Tobias Potye	16 Mar 1995	1330
7	(Cuba) Luis Zayas	7 Jun 1997	1323
8	(Poland) Norbert Kobielski	28 Jan 1997	1292
9	(Japan) Ryoichi Akamatsu	2 May 1995	1284
10	(Ukraine) Andrii Protsenko	20 May 1988	1273

Women

#	Athlete	Born	Points
1	(Ukraine) Yaroslava Mahuchikh	19 Sep 2001	1476
2	(Australia) Nicola Olyslagers	28 Dec 1996	1447
3	(Ukraine) Iryna Gerashchenko	10 Mar 1995	1370
4	(Serbia) Angelina Topić	26 Jul 2005	1350
5	(Australia) Eleanor Patterson	22 May 1996	1339
6	(United Kingdom) Morgan Lake	12 May 1997	1333
7	(United States) Vashti Cunningham	18 Jan 1998	1312
8	(Ukraine) Yuliia Levchenko	28 Nov 1997	1287
9	(Jamaica) Lamara Distin	3 Mar 2000	1263
10	(Kazakhstan) Nadezhda Dubovitskaya	12 Mar 1998	1250

=== Pole vault ===
Men

#	Athlete	Born	Points
1	(Sweden) Armand Duplantis	10 Nov 1999	1576
2	(Philippines) Ernest John Obiena	17 Nov 1995	1443
3	(United States) Christopher Nilsen	13 Jan 1998	1431
4	(Australia) Kurtis Marschall	25 Apr 1997	1398
5	(United States) Sam Kendricks	7 Sep 1992	1397
6	(United States) KC Lightfoot	11 Nov 1999	1369
7	(France) Thibaut Collet	17 Jun 1999	1360
8	(Belgium) Ben Broeders	21 Jun 1995	1337
9	(Poland) Piotr Lisek	16 Aug 1992	1328
10	(Germany) Bo Kanda Lita Baehre	29 Apr 1999	1327

Women

#	Athlete	Born	Points
1	(United States) Katie Moon	13 Jun 1991	1457
2	(Australia) Nina Kennedy	5 Apr 1997	1414
3	(Finland) Wilma Murto	11 Jun 1998	1405
4	(Slovenia) Tina Šutej	7 Nov 1988	1388
5	(United States) Sandi Morris	8 Jul 1992	1344
6	(United Kingdom) Molly Caudery	17 Mar 2000	1303
7	(Switzerland) Angelica Moser	9 Oct 1997	1301
8	(Canada) Alysha Newman	29 Jun 1994	1297
9	(United States) Bridget Williams	18 Mar 1996	1294
10	(Greece) Katerina Stefanidi	4 Feb 1990	1279

=== Long jump ===
Men

#	Athlete	Born	Points
1	(Greece) Miltiadis Tentoglou	18 Mar 1998	1433
2	(Jamaica) Tajay Gayle	2 Aug 1996	1360
3	(Jamaica) Wayne Pinnock	24 Oct 2000	1348
4	(Switzerland) Simon Ehammer	7 Feb 2000	1341
5	(China) Wang Jianan	27 Aug 1996	1328
6	(United States) Marquis Dendy	17 Nov 1992	1317
7	(Jamaica) Carey McLeod	14 Apr 1998	1315
8	(Sweden) Thobias Montler	15 Feb 1996	1311
9	(India) Murali Sreeshankar	27 Mar 1999	1309
10	(Czech Republic) Radek Juška	8 Mar 1993	1300

Women

#	Athlete	Born	Points
1	(Serbia) Ivana Španović	10 May 1990	1436
2	(United States) Tara Davis-Woodhall	20 May 1999	1377
3	(Italy) Larissa Iapichino	18 Jul 2002	1377
4	(Nigeria) Ese Brume	20 Jan 1996	1347
5	(United States) Quanesha Burks	15 Mar 1995	1337
6	(Burkina Faso) Marthe Koala	8 Mar 1994	1312
7	(Germany) Malaika Mihambo	3 Feb 1994	1309
8	(United Kingdom) Jazmin Sawyers	21 May 1994	1309
9	(Australia) Brooke Buschkuehl	12 Jul 1993	1288
10	(Romania) Alina Rotaru-Kottmann	5 Jun 1993	1285

=== Triple jump ===
Men

#	Athlete	Born	Points
1	(Burkina Faso) Hugues Fabrice Zango	25 Jun 1993	1456
2	(Italy) Andy Díaz	25 Dec 1995	1397
3	(Cuba) Lázaro Martínez	7 Feb 2000	1366
4	(Jamaica) Jaydon Hibbert	17 Jan 2005	1337
5	(Portugal) Pedro Pichardo	30 Jun 1993	1334
6	(China) Zhu Yaming	4 May 1994	1328
7	(Algeria) Yasser Triki	24 Mar 1997	1311
8	(Cuba) Cristian Nápoles	27 Nov 1998	1301
9	(China) Fang Yaoqing	20 Apr 1996	1294
10	(United States) Donald Scott	23 Feb 1992	1287

Women

#	Athlete	Born	Points
1	(Venezuela) Yulimar Rojas	21 Oct 1995	1476
2	(Jamaica) Shanieka Ricketts	2 Feb 1992	1405
3	(Ukraine) Maryna Bekh-Romanchuk	18 Jul 1995	1400
4	(Cuba) Leyanis Pérez	10 Jan 2002	1390
5	(Cuba) Liadagmis Povea	6 Feb 1996	1353
6	(Dominica) Thea LaFond	5 Apr 1994	1345
7	(Italy) Dariya Derkach	27 Mar 1993	1294
8	(Jamaica) Kimberly Williams	3 Nov 1988	1285
9	(United States) Keturah Orji	5 Mar 1996	1269
10	(United States) Tori Franklin	7 Oct 1992	1255

=== Shot put ===
Men

#	Athlete	Born	Points
1	(United States) Ryan Crouser	18 Dec 1992	1552
2	(New Zealand) Tom Walsh	1 Mar 1992	1448
3	(United States) Joe Kovacs	28 Jun 1989	1437
4	(Italy) Leonardo Fabbri	15 Apr 1997	1425
5	(United States) Payton Otterdahl	2 Apr 1996	1392
6	(Croatia) Filip Mihaljević	31 Jul 1994	1374
7	(New Zealand) Jacko Gill	20 Dec 1994	1346
8	(Italy) Zane Weir	7 Sep 1995	1341
9	(Czech Republic) Tomáš Staněk	13 Jun 1991	1338
10	(Nigeria) Chukwuebuka Enekwechi	28 Jan 1993	1320

Women

#	Athlete	Born	Points
1	(United States) Chase Ealey	20 Jul 1994	1441
2	(Canada) Sarah Mitton	20 Jun 1996	1416
3	(Portugal) Auriol Dongmo	3 Aug 1990	1387
4	(United States) Maggie Ewen	23 Sep 1994	1363
5	(Netherlands) Jessica Schilder	19 Mar 1999	1342
6	(Jamaica) Danniel Thomas-Dodd	11 Nov 1992	1331
7	(China) Gong Lijiao	24 Jan 1989	1317
8	(China) Song Jiayuan	15 Feb 1997	1270
9	(New Zealand) Maddi Wesche	13 Jun 1999	1264
10	(United States) Adelaide Aquilla	3 Mar 1999	1253

=== Discus throw ===
Men

#	Athlete	Born	Points
1	(Slovenia) Kristjan Čeh	17 Feb 1999	1467
2	(Sweden) Daniel Ståhl	27 Aug 1992	1441
3	(Lithuania) Mykolas Alekna	28 Sep 2002	1377
4	(Australia) Matthew Denny	2 Jun 1996	1375
5	(Lithuania) Andrius Gudžius	14 Feb 1991	1344
6	(Jamaica) Fedrick Dacres	28 Feb 1994	1304
7	(Austria) Lukas Weißhaidinger	20 Feb 1992	1304
8	(United Kingdom) Lawrence Okoye	6 Oct 1991	1295
9	(Jamaica) Traves Smikle	7 May 1992	1290
10	(Samoa) Alex Rose	17 Nov 1991	1284

Women

#	Athlete	Born	Points
1	(United States) Valarie Allman	23 Feb 1995	1445
2	(China) Feng Bin	3 Apr 1994	1399
3	(Croatia) Sandra Perković	21 Jun 1990	1388
4	(United States) Laulauga Tausaga	22 May 1998	1375
5	(Netherlands) Jorinde van Klinken	2 Feb 2000	1358
6	(Germany) Kristin Pudenz	9 Feb 1993	1326
7	(Germany) Shanice Craft	15 May 1993	1283
8	(Portugal) Liliana Cá	5 Nov 1986	1268
9	(Cuba) Claudine Vita	19 Sep 1996	1262
10	(France) Mélina Robert-Michon	18 Jul 1979	1253

=== Hammer throw ===
Men

#	Athlete	Born	Points
1	(Poland) Wojciech Nowicki	22 Feb 1989	1425
2	(Canada) Ethan Katzberg	5 Apr 2002	1369
3	(United States) Rudy Winkler	6 Dec 1994	1362
4	(Hungary) Bence Halász	4 Aug 1997	1349
5	(Ukraine) Mykhaylo Kokhan	22 Jan 2001	1337
6	(Poland) Paweł Fajdek	4 Jun 1989	1309
7	(Norway) Eivind Henriksen	14 Sep 1990	1303
8	(United States) Daniel Haugh	3 May 1995	1299
9	(Greece) Christos Frantzeskakis	26 Apr 2000	1256
10	(Chile) Gabriel Kehr	3 Sep 1996	1245

Women

#	Athlete	Born	Points
1	(Canada) Camryn Rogers	7 Jun 1999	1416
2	(United States) Brooke Andersen	23 Aug 1995	1386
3	(United States) Janee' Kassanavoid	19 Jan 1995	1367
4	(United States) DeAnna Price	8 Jun 1993	1338
5	(Romania) Bianca Ghelber	1 Jun 1990	1288
6	(Finland) Silja Kosonen	16 Dec 20002	1287
7	(Italy) Sara Fantini	16 Sep 1997	1283
8	(Azerbaijan) Hanna Skydan	14 May 1992	1273
9	(China) Wang Zheng	14 Dec 1987	1247
10	(United States) Annette Echikunwoke	29 Jul 1996	1245

=== Javelin throw ===
Men

#	Athlete	Born	Points
1	(India) Neeraj Chopra	24 Dec 1997	1432
2	(Czech Republic) Jakub Vadlejch	10 Oct 1990	1412
3	(Germany) Julian Weber	29 Aug 1994	1375
4	(Finland) Oliver Helander	1 Jan 1997	1322
5	(Grenada) Anderson Peters	21 Oct 1997	1284
6	(Trinidad and Tobago) Keshorn Walcott	2 Apr 1993	1272
7	(India) Kishore Jena	6 Sep 1995	1268
8	(Japan) Genki Dean	30 Dec 1991	1257
9	(Lithuania) Edis Matusevičius	30 Jun 1996	1250
10	(Moldova) Andrian Mardare	20 Jun 1995	1244

Women

#	Athlete	Born	Points
1	(Japan) Haruka Kitaguchi	16 Mar 1998	1432
2	(Australia) Mackenzie Little	22 Dec 1996	1351
3	(Colombia) Flor Ruiz	29 Jan 1991	1309
4	(Austria) Victoria Hudson	28 May 1996	1279
5	(Latvia) Līna Mūze	4 Dec 1992	1259
6	(New Zealand) Tori Peeters	17 May 1994	1256
7	(Australia) Kelsey-Lee Barber	20 Sep 1991	1251
8	(China) Liu Shiying	24 Sep 1993	1228
9	(Latvia) Anete Sietiņa	5 Feb 1996	1227
10	(United States) Maggie Malone	30 Dec 1993	1214

=== Marathon ===
Men

#	Athlete	Born	Points
1	(Kenya) Kelvin Kiptum	2 Dec 1999	1504
2	(Kenya) Eliud Kipchoge	5 Nov 1984	1488
3	(Kenya) Benson Kipruto	17 Mar 1991	1408
4	(Ethiopia) Tsegaye Getachew	30 Nov 1996	1385
5	(Ethiopia) Leul Gebresilase	20 Sep 1992	1374
6	(Uganda) Victor Kiplangat	10 Nov 1999	1373
7	(Tanzania) Gabriel Geay	10 Sep 1996	1373
8	(Ethiopia) Tamirat Tola	11 Aug 1991	1371
9	(Kenya) Amos Kipruto	16 Sep 1992	1367
10	(Kenya) Evans Chebet	12 Feb 1992	1366

Women

#	Athlete	Born	Points
1	(Ethiopia) Tigst Assefa	3 Dec 1996	1488
2	(Ethiopia) Amane Beriso Shankule	13 Oct 1991	1462
3	(Netherlands) Sifan Hassan	1 Jan 1993	1443
4	(Kenya) Ruth Chepngetich	8 Aug 1994	1443
5	(Kenya) Rosemary Wanjiru	9 Dec 1994	1412
6	(Ethiopia) Gotytom Gebreslase	15 Jan 1995	1404
7	(Ethiopia) Yalemzerf Yehualaw	3 Aug 1999	1382
8	(Kenya) Sheila Chepkirui	27 Dec 1990	1380
9	(Ethiopia) Alemu Megertu	12 Oct 1997	1378
10	(Ethiopia) Tsehay Gemechu	12 Dec 1998	1377

=== 20 km racewalking ===
Men

#	Athlete	Born	Points
1	(Spain) Álvaro Martín	18 Jun 1994	1383
2	(Brazil) Caio Bonfim	19 Mar 1991	1358
3	(Sweden) Perseus Karlström	2 May 1990	1355
4	(Ecuador) Brian Pintado	29 Jul 1995	1317
5	(Germany) Christopher Linke	24 Oct 1988	1304
6	(Canada) Evan Dunfee	28 Sep 1990	1303
7	(Australia) Declan Tingay	6 Feb 1999	1296
8	(Finland) Aku Partanen	28 Oct 1991	1288
9	(Ecuador) David Hurtado	21 Apr 1999	1279
10	(Italy) Francesco Fortunato	13 Dec 1994	1278

Women

#	Athlete	Born	Points
1	(Peru) Kimberly García	19 Oct 1993	1331
2	(Spain) María Pérez	29 Apr 1996	1330
3	(Australia) Jemima Montag	15 Feb 1998	1307
4	(Mexico) Alegna González	2 Jan 1999	1293
5	(China) Qieyang Shijie	11 Nov 1990	1261
6	(Ecuador) Glenda Morejón	30 May 2000	1248
7	(China) Ma Zhenxia	1 Aug 1998	1243
8	(Italy) Antonella Palmisano	6 Aug 1991	1236
9	(Greece) Antigoni Drisbioti	21 Mar 1984	1233
10	(China) Yang Jiayu	18 Feb 1996	1224

=== 35 km racewalking ===
Men

#	Athlete	Born	Points
1	(Spain) Álvaro Martín	18 Jun 1994	1394
2	(Japan) Masatora Kawano	23 Oct 1998	1383
3	(Ecuador) Brian Pintado	29 Jul 1995	1377
4	(Italy) Massimo Stano	27 Feb 1992	1364
5	(Canada) Evan Dunfee	28 Sep 1990	1335
6	(Germany) Christopher Linke	24 Oct 1988	1329
7	(Sweden) Perseus Karlström	2 May 1990	1326
8	(Japan) Tomohiro Noda	24 Jan 1996	1323
9	(Spain) Miguel Ángel López	3 Jul 1988	1292
10	(China) He Xianghong	1 Jul 1998	1265

Women

#	Athlete	Born	Points
1	(Spain) María Pérez	29 Apr 1996	1450
2	(Peru) Kimberly García	19 Oct 1993	1440
3	(Greece) Antigoni Drisbioti	21 Mar 1984	1361
4	(Brazil) Viviane Lyra	29 Jul 1993	1299
5	(Spain) Cristina Montesinos	12 Jul 1994	1290
6	(Japan) Serena Sonoda	16 Apr 1995	1273
7	(China) Liu Hong	12 May 1987	1272
8	(Poland) Katarzyna Zdziebło	28 Nov 1996	1270
9	(China) Qieyang Shijie	11 Nov 1990	1270
10	(Spain) Raquel González	16 Nov 1989	1265

=== Decathlon & Heptathlon ===
Men

#	Athlete	Born	Points
1	(Canada) Pierce LePage	22 Jan 1996	1446
2	(Canada) Damian Warner	4 Nov 1989	1430
3	(Grenada) Lindon Victor	28 Feb 1993	1395
4	(Germany) Leo Neugebauer	19 Jun 2000	1363
5	(Estonia) Karel Tilga	5 Feb 1998	1359
6	(France) Kevin Mayer	10 Feb 1992	1325
7	(United States) Harrison Williams	7 Mar 1996	1321
8	(Estonia) Janek Õiglane	25 Apr 1994	1316
9	(Norway) Markus Rooth	22 Dec 2001	1306
10	(Germany) Niklas Kaul	11 Feb 1998	1301

Women

#	Athlete	Born	Points
1	(United States) Anna Hall	23 Mar 2001	1423
2	(United Kingdom) Katarina Johnson-Thompson	9 Jan 1993	1387
3	(Netherlands) Anouk Vetter	4 Feb 1993	1367
4	(Belgium) Nafissatou Thiam	19 Aug 1994	1363
5	(Netherlands) Emma Oosterwegel	29 Jun 1998	1316
6	(Belgium) Noor Vidts	30 May 1996	1292
7	(Poland) Adrianna Sułek	3 Apr 1999	1292
8	(Hungary) Xénia Krizsán	13 Jan 1993	1288
9	(Germany) Sophie Weißenberg	24 Sep 1997	1277
10	(United States) Chari Hawkins	21 May 1991	1247
