= Dominican Republic at the 2009 World Championships in Athletics =

- WA code: DOM

in Berlin
- Competitors: 5 (4 men, 1 woman)
- Medals: Gold 0 Silver 0 Bronze 0 Total 0

World Championships in Athletics appearances
- 1983; 1987; 1991; 1993; 1995; 1997; 1999; 2001; 2003; 2005; 2007; 2009; 2011; 2013; 2015; 2017; 2019; 2022; 2023; 2025

The Dominican Republic competes at the 2009 World Championships in Athletics from 15 to 23 August in Berlin.

== Team selection ==
Track and road events

| Event | Athletes | |
| Event | Men | Women |
|---|---|---|
| 100 metres | Carlos Jorge | |
| 400 metres | Arismendy Peguero; Alvin Harrison | |
| 400 metre hurdles | Félix Sánchez | Yolanda Osana |
| 4 x 400 metres relay | TBA | |

Field and combined events

| Event | Athletes | |
| Event | Men | Women |
|---|---|---|
| Long jump | Carlos Jorge | |
