= Dominican Republic at the 2011 World Championships in Athletics =

- WA code: DOM
- National federation: Federación Dominicana de Asociaciones de Atletismo
- Website: www.fedomatle.org

in Daegu
- Competitors: 4
- Medals: Gold 0 Silver 0 Bronze 0 Total 0

World Championships in Athletics appearances
- 1983; 1987; 1991; 1993; 1995; 1997; 1999; 2001; 2003; 2005; 2007; 2009; 2011; 2013; 2015; 2017; 2019; 2022; 2023

The Dominican Republic competed at the 2011 World Championships in Athletics from August 27 to September 4 in Daegu, South Korea. A team of 4 athletes was announced to represent the country in the event. The team is led by Olympic gold medalist and former 400m hurdles world champion Félix Sánchez.

== Results ==
=== Men ===
Athlete	Event	Preliminaries		Heats		Semifinals		Final	
Athlete	Event	Time Width Height	Rank	Time Width Height	Rank	Time Width Height	Rank	Time Width Height	Rank
Carlos Jorge	100 metres			10.62	41	Did not advance			
Arismendy Peguero	400 metres			Did not start		Did not advance			
Félix Sánchez	400 m hurdles			48.74 SB	6	49.01	6	48.87	4

=== Women ===
Athlete	Event	Preliminaries		Heats		Semifinals		Final	
Athlete	Event	Time Width Height	Rank	Time Width Height	Rank	Time Width Height	Rank	Time Width Height	Rank
LaVonne Idlette	100 m hurdles			13.39	28	Did not advance			
