= Dominican Republic at the 2019 World Athletics Championships =

Dominican Republic at the 2019 World Championships in Athletics
- Flag of the Dominican Republic
- WA code: DOM
- National federation: Athletics Federation of the Dominican Republic
- Website: fedomatle.org

in Doha, Qatar
- Competitors: 2
- Medals: Gold 0 Silver 0 Bronze 0 Total 0

World Championships in Athletics appearances
- 1983; 1987; 1991; 1993; 1995; 1997; 1999; 2001; 2003; 2005; 2007; 2009; 2011; 2013; 2015; 2017; 2019; 2022; 2023

The Dominican Republic competed at the 2019 World Championships in Athletics in Doha, Qatar, from 27 September to 6 October 2019.

== Results ==
Key

- Q = Qualified for the next round
- q = Qualified for the next round as a fastest loser or, in field events, by position without achieving the qualifying target
- NR = National record
- PB = Personal best
- SB = Season best
- N/A = Round not applicable for the event

=== Men ===
Track and road events

Athlete	Event	Heat		Semi-final		Final	
Athlete	Event	Result	Rank	Result	Rank	Result	Rank
Yancarlos Martínez	200 metres	20.47	25 Q	20.28 SB	9	Did not advance	

=== Women ===
Track and road events

Athlete	Event	Heat		Semi-final		Final	
Athlete	Event	Result	Rank	Result	Rank	Result	Rank
Marileidy Paulino	200 metres	23.04 SB	20 q	23.03 SB	17	Did not advance	
