= Dominican Republic at the 2017 World Championships in Athletics =

- Flag of the Dominican Republic
- WA code: DOM
- National federation: Athletics Federation of the Dominican Republic
- Website: fedomatle.org (in Spanish)

in London, United Kingdom 4–13 August 2017
- Competitors: 3 (2 men and 1 woman) in 3 events
- Medals: Gold 0 Silver 0 Bronze 0 Total 0

World Championships in Athletics appearances
- 1983; 1987; 1991; 1993; 1995; 1997; 1999; 2001; 2003; 2005; 2007; 2009; 2011; 2013; 2015; 2017; 2019; 2022; 2023

The Dominican Republic competed at the 2017 World Championships in Athletics in London, Great Britain, from 4–13 August 2017.

== Results ==
=== Men ===
Track and road events

Athlete	Event	Heat		Semifinal		Final	
Athlete	Event	Result	Rank	Result	Rank	Result	Rank
Luguelín Santos	400 metres	45.73	24	Did not advance			
Juander Santos	400 metres hurdles	49.19	2 Q	48.59 PB	3 Q	49.04	6

=== Women ===
Track and road events

Athlete	Event	Heat		Semifinal		Final	
Athlete	Event	Result	Rank	Result	Rank	Result	Rank
Mariely Sánchez	200 metres	23.89	40	Did not advance			
