= 2022 World Athletics Championships – Mixed 4 × 400 metres relay =

Mixed 4 × 400 metres relay at the 2022 World Championships
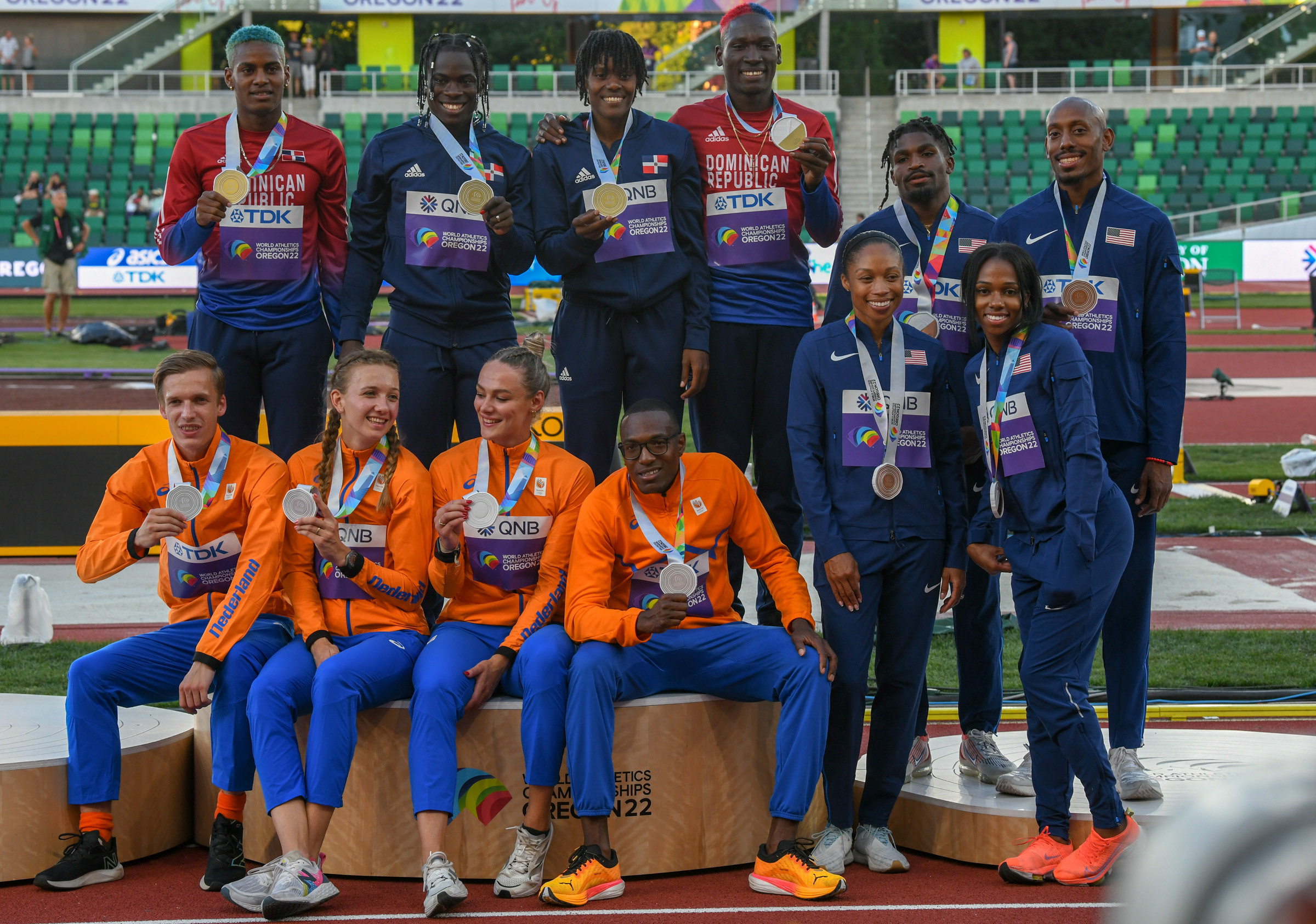
- Medaling teams of the Dominican Repulic (back), the Netherlands (front), and the United States (right)
- Venue: Hayward Field
- Location: Eugene, Oregon, United States
- Dates: 15 July 2022 (heats & final)
- Teams: 16
- Winning time: 3:09.82 min NR

Medalists
gold medal	Lidio Andres Feliz; Marileidy Paulino; Alexander Ogando; Fiordaliza Cofil	Dominican Republic
silver medal	Liemarvin Bonevacia; Lieke Klaver; Tony van Diepen; Femke Bol	Netherlands
bronze medal	Elija Godwin; Allyson Felix; Vernon Norwood; Kennedy Simon	United States

The mixed 4 × 400 metres relay at the 2022 World Athletics Championships was held over two rounds at Hayward Field in Eugene, Oregon, United States, on 15 July 2022. It was the second time that this mixed-sex relay was contested at the World Athletics Championships. National teams could qualify through the 2021 World Athletics Relays or by their position on the World Athletics top list.

Fifteen teams competed in round 1, where eight teams advanced to the final, which was won by the team of the Dominican Republic in a national record of 3:09.82 minutes. In second place was the team of the Netherlands in a national record of 3:09.90 min and in third place the team of the United States in 3:10.16 min.

== Background ==
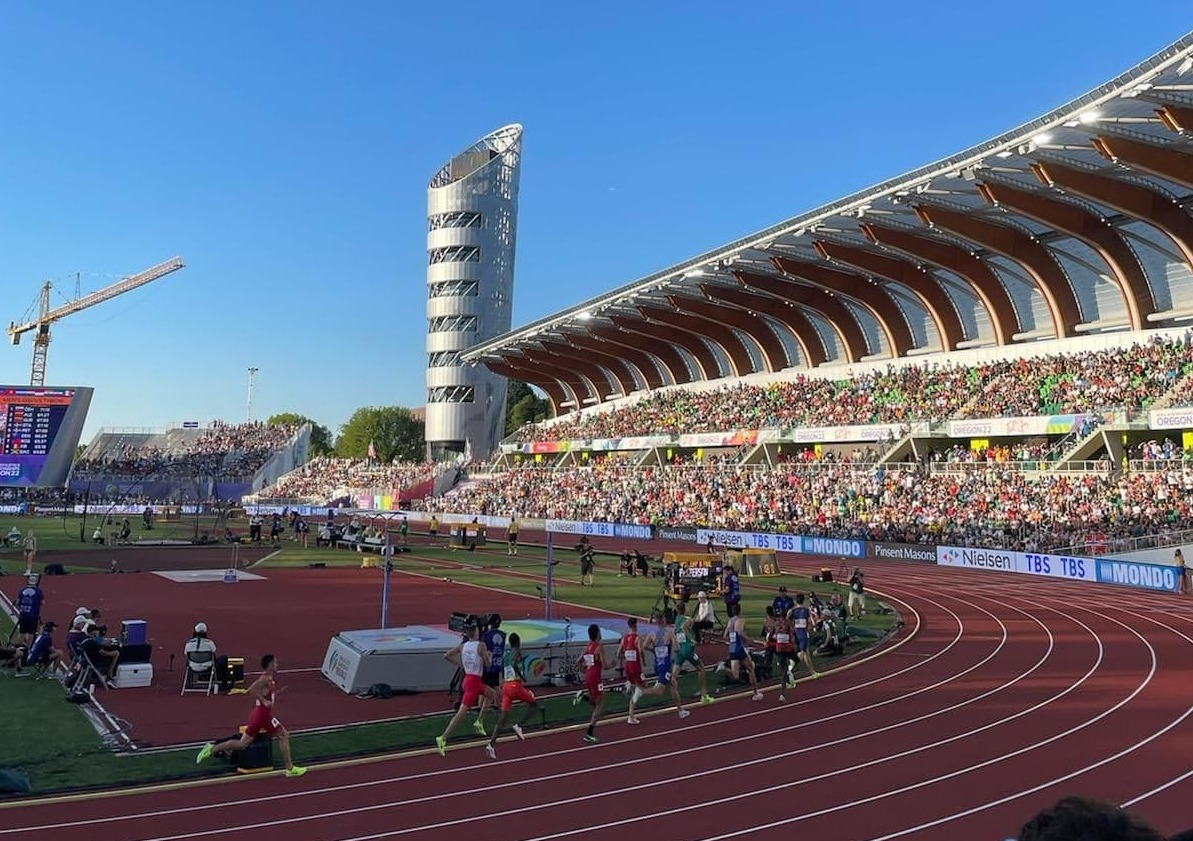
Hayward Field in July 2022

The mixed 4 × 400 metres relay is a mixed-sex relay with two male and two female athletes on each team. Athletes each run one lap on a 400-metre track while passing on a baton between team members. The world championship in this event was introduced in 2019, so it had been contested once at the World Athletics Championships before 2022. The running order of man-women-man-woman was mandatory for the first time in 2022.

Before the championships, the world record of 3:09.34 min was set by the relay team of the United States in 2019.

Global records before the 2022 World Athletics Championships
Record	Nation (athletes)	Time	Location	Date
World record	United States (Wilbert London, Allyson Felix, Courtney Okolo, Michael Cherry)	3:09.34	Doha, Qatar	29 September 2019
Championship record	United States (Wilbert London, Allyson Felix, Courtney Okolo, Michael Cherry)	3:09.34	Doha, Qatar	29 September 2019
World leading	Nigeria	3:15.58	Benin City, Nigeria	26 June 2022

Area records before the 2022 World Athletics Championships
Record	Nation (athletes)	Time	Location	Date
African Record	Nigeria (Ifeanyi Ojeli, Imaobong Uko, Samson Nathaniel, Patience Okon George)	3:13.60	Tokyo, Japan	30 July 2021
Asian record	Bahrain (Musa Isah, Aminat Jamal, Salwa Eid Naser, Abbas Abubakar Abbas)	3:11.82	Doha, Qatar	29 September 2019
North, Central American and Caribbean record	United States (Wilbert London, Allyson Felix, Courtney Okolo, Michael Cherry)	3:09.34 WR	Doha, Qatar	29 September 2019
South American record	Brazil (Pedro Burmann, Tiffani Marinho, Tábata de Carvalho, Anderson Henriques)	3:15.89	Tokyo, Japan	30 July 2021
European record	Poland (Karol Zalewski, Natalia Kaczmarek, Justyna Święty-Ersetic, Kajetan Duszyński)	3:09.87	Tokyo, Japan	31 July 2021
Oceanian record	Australia (Bendere Oboya, Anneliese Rubie-Renshaw, Tyler Gunn, Alex Beck)	3:17.00	Gold Coast, Australia	12 June 2021

== Qualification ==
The standard to qualify automatically for entry was to finish in the first 12 at 2021 World Relays, completed by 4 top lists' teams.

== Results ==
=== Round 1 ===
The two heats of the first round were held on 15 July, starting at 11:45 (UTC−7) in the morning. The first three athletes in each heat (Q) and the next two fastest athletes overall (q) qualified for the final. In the first heat, the team of the United States finished in a new world leading time (WL) 3:11.75. In the second heat, the team of South Africa did not start (DNS).

Results of round 1
Rank	Heat	Nation	Athletes	Time	Notes
1	1	United States	Elija Godwin, Kennedy Simon, Vernon Norwood, Wadeline Jonathas	3:11.75	Q, WL
2	1	Netherlands	Liemarvin Bonevacia, Lieke Klaver, Tony van Diepen, Eveline Saalberg	3:12.63	Q, SB
3	2	Dominican Republic	Lidio Andrés Feliz, Fiordaliza Cofil, Alexander Ogando, Marileidy Paulino	3:13.22	Q, SB
4	1	Poland	Kajetan Duszyński, Iga Baumgart-Witan, Karol Zalewski, Justyna Święty-Ersetic	3:13.70	Q, SB
5	2	Ireland	Christopher O'Donnell, Sophie Becker, Jack Raftery, Rhasidat Adeleke	3:13.88	Q, SB
6	1	Italy	Lorenzo Benati, Ayomide Folorunso, Brayan Lopez, Alice Mangione	3:13.89	q, SB
7	2	Jamaica	Demish Gaye, Roneisha McGregor, Karayme Bartley, Tiffany James	3:13.95	Q, SB
8	1	Nigeria	Samson Nathaniel, Patience Okon George, Dubem Amene, Imaobong Uko	3:14.59	q, SB
9	1	Great Britain & N.I.	Joseph Brier, Zoey Clark, Alex Haydock-Wilson, Laviai Nielsen	3:14.75	SB
10	1	Belgium	Alexander Doom, Camille Laus, Christian Iguacel, Helena Ponette	3:16.01	SB
11	2	Spain	Iñaki Cañal, Sara Gallego, Óscar Husillos, Eva Santidrián	3:16.14	SB
12	2	Germany	Patrick Schneider, Corinna Schwab, Marvin Schlegel, Alica Schmidt	3:16.80	SB
13	1	Japan	Yuki Joseph Nakajima, Nanako Matsumoto, Ryuki Iwasaki, Mayu Kobayashi	3:17.31	SB
14	2	Brazil	Douglas Mendes, Tiffani Marinho, Vitor Hugo de Miranda, Tábata de Carvalho	3:18.19	SB
15	2	Bahamas	Bradley Dormeus, Megan Moss, Alonzo Russell, Doneisha Anderson	3:19.73	SB
	2	South Africa		DNS	

=== Final ===
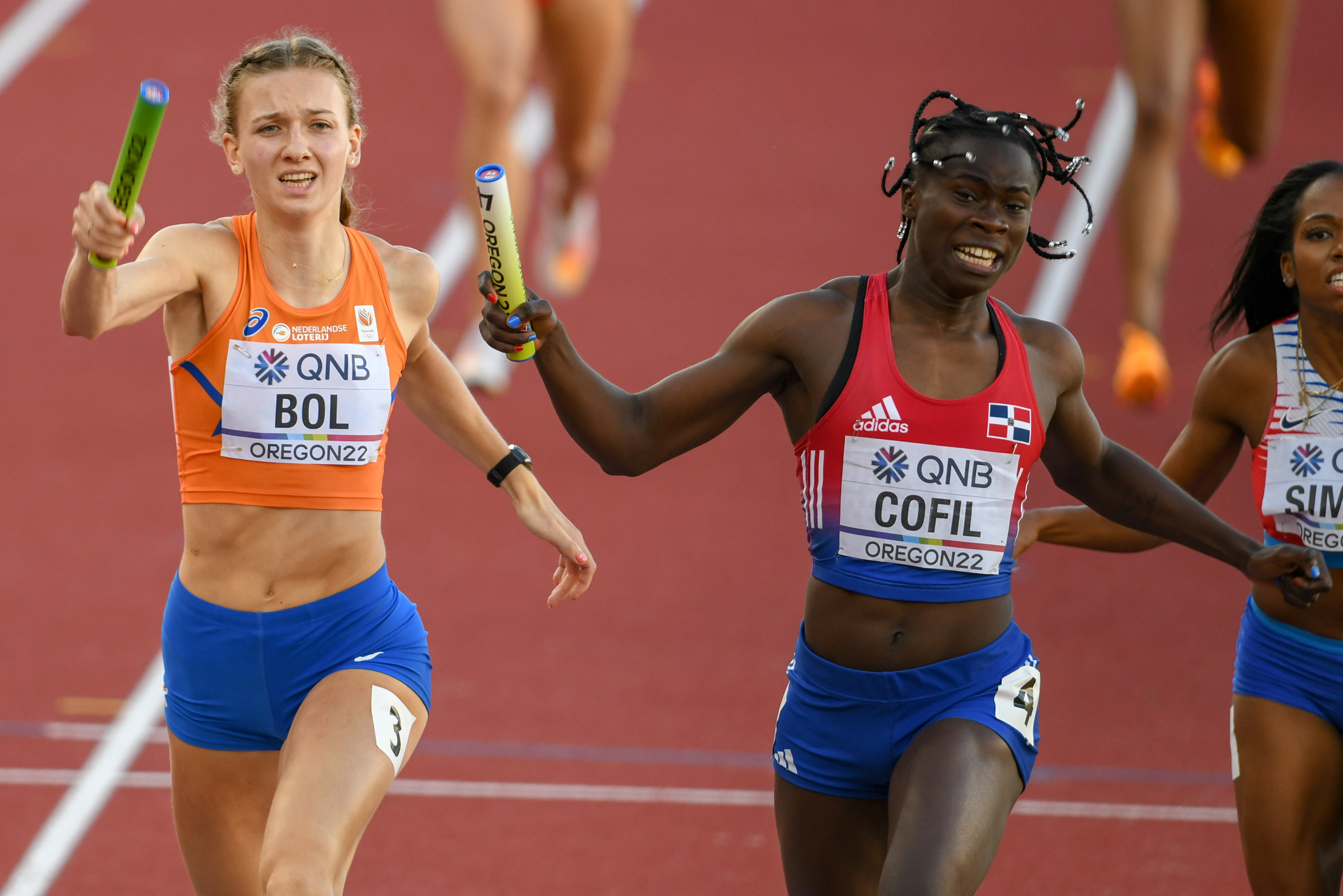
Femke Bol and Fiordaliza Cofil at the finish in the final

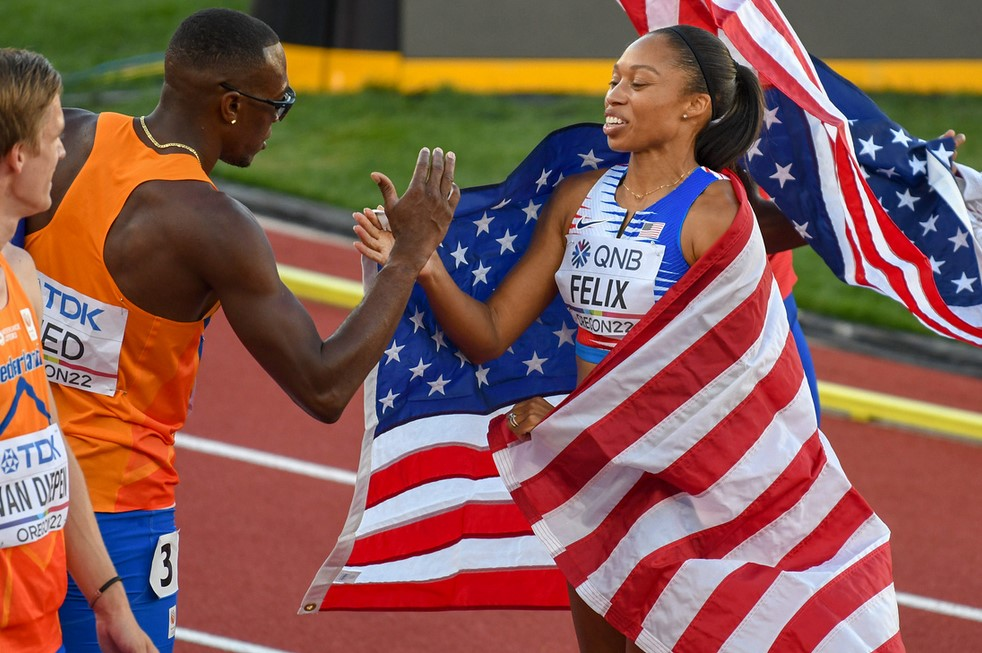
Liemarvin Bonevacia and Allyson Felix after the final race

The final was held on 15 July, starting at 19:50 (UTC−7) in the evening. At the end of the first leg, Elija Godwin of the United States was first to hand over the baton, followed by Karol Zalewski of Poland and Christopher O'Donnell of Ireland. Lidio Andres Feliz of the Dominican Republic handed over in fourth position and Liemarvin Bonevacia of the Netherlands in seventh position. At the end of the second leg, Marileidy Paulino of the Dominican Republic had moved into the first position, followed by Allyson Felix of the United States and Lieke Klaver of the Netherlands. At the end of the third leg, Vernon Norwood of the United States had taken over the leading position, followed by Alexander Ogando of the Dominican Republic and Tony van Diepen of the Netherlands. In the anchor leg, Fiordaliza Cofil moved to the first position, followed by Femke Bol of the Netherlands and Kennedy Simon of the United States. The race was won by the team of the Dominican Republic in world leading time (WL) and national record (NR) of 3:09.82 min. In second place fininshed the team of the Netherlands in a national record (NR) of 3:09.90 min and in third place finished the team of the United States in a season's best (SB) of 3:10.16 min. The fastest male split time was 44.40 s by Norwood. The fastest female split time was 48.47 s by Paulino.

Results of the final
Rank	Nation	Athletes	Time	Notes
1st place, gold medalist(s)	Dominican Republic	Lidio Andrés Feliz, Marileidy Paulino, Alexander Ogando, Fiordaliza Cofil	3:09.82	WL, NR
2nd place, silver medalist(s)	Netherlands	Liemarvin Bonevacia, Lieke Klaver, Tony van Diepen, Femke Bol	3:09.90	NR
3rd place, bronze medalist(s)	United States	Elija Godwin, Allyson Felix, Vernon Norwood, Kennedy Simon	3:10.16	SB
4	Poland	Karol Zalewski, Justyna Święty-Ersetic, Kajetan Duszyński, Natalia Kaczmarek	3:12.31	SB
5	Jamaica	Demish Gaye, Tiffany James, Karayme Bartley, Stacey-Ann Williams	3:12.71	SB
6	Nigeria	Samson Nathaniel, Imaobong Uko, Dubem Amene, Patience Okon George	3:16.21	
7	Italy	Lorenzo Benati, Ayomide Folorunso, Brayan Lopez, Alice Mangione	3:16.45	
8	Ireland	Christopher O'Donnell, Sophie Becker, Jack Raftery, Sharlene Mawdsley	3:16.86	
