= Marileidy Paulino =

Dominican sprinter (born 1996)

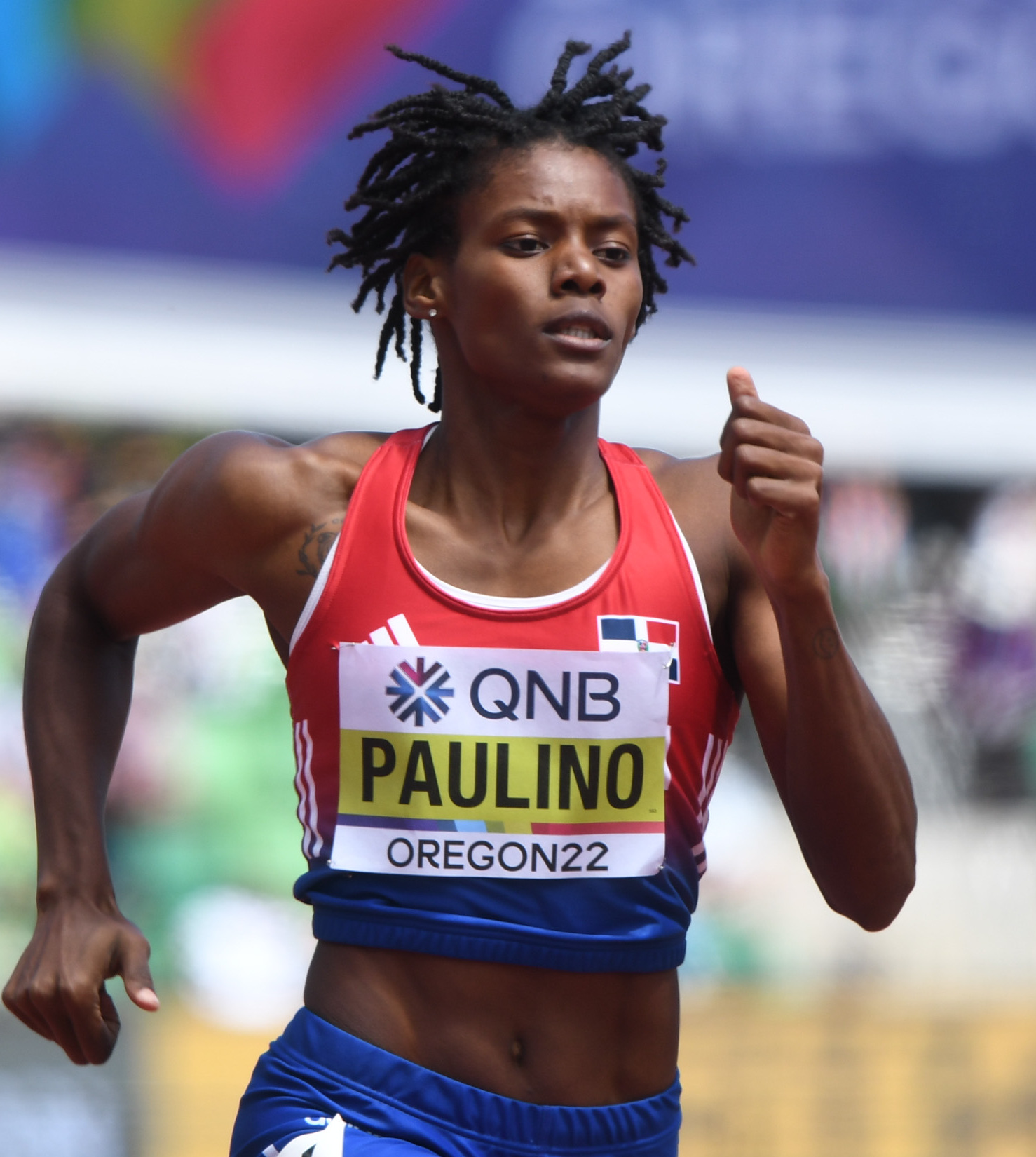
- Paulino at the 2022 World Athletics Championships

Personal information
- Born: 25 October 1996 (age 30) Nizao, Peravia Province, Dominican Republic
- Height: 1.72 m (5 ft 8 in)

Sport
- Country: Dominican Republic
- Sport: Track and field
- Event: Sprint
- Coached by: Yassen Pérez Gómez

Achievements and titles
- Highest world ranking: 1st (400 m, 2023)
- Personal bests: 100 m: 11.38 (Bogotá 2023); 200 m: 22.30 NR (Miami 2025); 300 m: 35.16 NR (Puerto Rico 2023); 400 m: 47.98 NR (Tokyo 2025)
Medal record
Women's athletics
Representing the Dominican Republic
Olympic Games
| Gold medal – first place | 2024 Paris | 400 m |
| Silver medal – second place | 2020 Tokyo | 400 m |
| Silver medal – second place | 2020 Tokyo | 4 × 400 m mixed |
World Championships
| Gold medal – first place | 2022 Eugene | 4 × 400 m mixed |
| Gold medal – first place | 2023 Budapest | 400 m |
| Silver medal – second place | 2022 Eugene | 400 m |
| Silver medal – second place | 2025 Tokyo | 400 m |
World Ultimate Championship
| First place | 2026 Budapest | 400 m |
Diamond League
| First place | 2022 | 400 m |
| First place | 2023 | 400 m |
| First place | 2024 | 400 m |
| First place | 2026 | 400 m |
Pan American Games
| Gold medal – first place | 2023 Santiago | 200 m |
| Gold medal – first place | 2023 Santiago | 4 × 400 m mixed |
| Silver medal – second place | 2023 Santiago | 4 × 400 m relay |
| Bronze medal – third place | 2023 Santiago | 4 × 100 m relay |
Central American and Caribbean Games
| Gold medal – first place | 2023 San Salvador | 400 m |
| Gold medal – first place | 2026 Santo Domingo | 400 m |
| Gold medal – first place | 2026 Santo Domingo | 4 × 400 m mixed |
| Silver medal – second place | 2023 San Salvador | 4 × 400 m relay |
| Bronze medal – third place | 2023 San Salvador | 4 × 100 m relay |
| Bronze medal – third place | 2018 Barranquilla | 4 × 100 m relay |
Military World Games
| Silver medal – second place | 2019 Wuhan | 200 m |
Ibero-American Championships
| Gold medal – first place | 2022 Alicante | 400 m |
| Gold medal – first place | 2022 Alicante | 4 × 100 m relay |

Marileidy Paulino (born 25 October 1996) is a Dominican athlete sprinter specializing in the 400 meters. She won the silver medal at the 2020 Tokyo Olympics, becoming the first woman from the Dominican Republic to earn an individual Olympic medal in athletics. At the subsequent Summer Olympics in Paris, she won the gold medal in the 400 metres event, becoming only the third person from the Dominican Republic to win an Olympic gold medal. Paulino also took silver at the 2022 World Athletics Championships. At these competitions, she also earned silver and gold in the mixed 4 × 400 m relay respectively, running legs of 48.7 s in 2021 and 48.47 s in 2022. Since May 2023, Paulino is the 400 m ranked world No. 1.

Paulino won the silver medal in the 200 meters at the 2019 Military World Games and gold for the 400 m at the 2022 Ibero-American Championships and the 2023 Central American and Caribbean Games. She won the 2022 Diamond League 400 m title. She is the Dominican Republic record holder for the indoor 60 m, 200 m indoors and out, and 400 m.

== Personal life ==
Paulino was born in Don Gregorio village, in the Nizao municipality of the Peravia province, on 25 October 1996. She was raised by her mother, Anatalia Paulino, and is the fifth of six brothers and sisters.

Paulino was discovered while studying at the Alirio Paulino High School in her hometown of Nizao and began getting involved in sports. She played volleyball and almost made the handball national team. After playing for a year, she was seen competing by the then sports minister and was included in the track and field camp and recruited by the Athletics Federation. She started practicing track and field barefoot.

As of 2021, she studies physical education at the Universidad Autónoma de Santo Domingo. In 2023, Paulino was promoted to Second lieutenant and decorated with the Panamerican Flight Medal in the Dominican Air Force, where she has won several medals in the Dominican Republic Military Games.

== Career ==
=== 2015 ===
She competed in the III Dominican Republic Youth Games winning the 100 m silver medal with a 12.70 time representing her province, Peravia. She led her province in the Restoration Cup handball tournament with six goals.

=== 2016 ===
She helped the Southern Region of the Dominican Republic to win the Relay, Jump and Throw Festival when she was part of the 4 × 100 meters that won the tournament's bronze medal.

Paulino was part of the 4 × 100 meters relay team that finished in fifth place at the Ibero-American Championships with 44.56. She then traveled to Havana, Cuba for the Memorial Barrientos, arriving in fifth place in the 100 m with 11.61 and winning the silver medal in 200 m with 24.10.

Paulino surprisingly won the Athletics National Championships in 100 m with 11.96 and was defined as the recipient of the country's main hope in female athletics. In Cali, Colombia, Paulino participated in the Valle Oro Puro Grand Prix, having finished in the sixth place of the 200 m with 24.15.

Already recruited by the Athletics Federation and envisioned as one of the sport's rising talents, she traveled to the NACAC Under-23 Championships in San Salvador, El Salvador. She ranked fifth in 100 m with a time of 12.02 in the heats and was fifth in the final with an 11.98 time. She ran 24.43 in the 200 m preliminary round heats and 24.00 in the final, ending in sixth place.

=== 2017 ===
Praised by the president of the national federation for her physical conditions and mentioned among a group a talented young athletes who were projected to be the future of athletics in the country, she participated in the Dominican Republic Military games, winning the 100 m silver medal with an 11.63 time, bronze in 400 m with a 56.30 and winning the gold medals in 4 × 100 m (40.39) and 4 × 100 m Relays (3:40.96). Paulino settled with the silver medal when the three times Olympic athlete, Mariely Sánchez defeat her in the National Championships' 100 m finals. At the Ximena Restrepo International Grand Prix held in Medellín, Colombia, she took part in the 100 m finishing in sixth place with 11.67 and had 23.78 in 200 m to win the bronze medal. During the Memorial Barrientos in Cuba she participated in the 200 m where she clocked 24.02 in the preliminary heats and 23.77 in the final winning the gold medal. She also won the gold medal in 4 × 100 metres relay with 45.37. Later that year, she represented the Dominican Republic at the Summer Universiade in the 200 metres where she timed 24.13 finishing 13th in the heats and 23.95 ranking 11 in the semifinals but did not make it to the finals. She also took part in the 4 × 100 metres relay, but her team was disqualified in the preliminary round.

=== 2018 ===
She took part at the Dominican Republic Military Games, winning gold in both 100 m with 11.74 and 200 m with 23.35, and with those results, she qualified for the 2018 Central American and Caribbean Games and later led her military branch team that won the 4 × 100 meters relay.

She participated in the Ximena Restrepo International Grand Prix, she won the gold in 100 m with an 11.62 mark and the bronze in 200 m with 23.63. Preparing tour the 2018 Central American and Caribbean Games, she took part at the Villanova Invitational at the Ocean Breeze Athletic Complex, New York where she set a new 200 m national record when she won the golden medal with 23.82, beating the former record of 24.19 held by Mariely Sánchez Hichez also winning silver medal in the 60 m event by clocking 7.45. During the National Evangelical University internal tournament, she placed first in the preliminary round of the 100 m with 11.98 and the same time to claim the gold medal.

Paulino traveled to Barranquilla, Colombia to the Central American and Caribbean Games where she participated in the 100 meter competition, registering 11.27 during the heats, 11.39 during the semifinals and finally 11.33, ending up in fourth place. In the 200 meters she ran a national record of 22.87 during the preliminary heats, 22.98 in the semifinals and finished in fourth place with a mark of 23.04. In her last participation during the games, she was part of the bronze medal team with Mariely Sánchez, Nicole de Aza and Anabel Medina in the 4 × 100 meters relay that registered 43.68.

Paulino received an apartment from the government along with volleyball player and Central American and Caribbean Games medalist Cándida Arias in her home town of Nizao.

She participated in the 2018 National Games in the 100 m as one of the main attractions, and as expected, she won the gold medal with an 11.92 mark representing the Southern Region. Those games were taken by her as preparations for the following year Pan American Games.

=== 2019 ===
She was instrumental for her consecutive military branch victory at the Dominican Republic Military Games with fourth gold medals: 100 m 11.84, 200 m 23.41, 4 × 100 meters with 44.44 and 4 × 400 meters relay with 3:34.67 and was awarded Best Female Athlete for the games and Armed Forces Athlete of the Year.

At the Grenada Invitational at St. George's, Grenada, she was seventh in 100 m with 11.69 and won the 200 m bronze medal with 23.29. She went to participate at the PURE Athletics/NTC Spring Invitational in Clermont, Florida she registered 11.47 in the heats and was fourth in 100 m with 11.45, also having competed in the 200 m with 23.10. She then headed to the Caterine Ibargüen Grand Prix held in Barranquilla, Colombia she won the golden medal in 100 m with an 11.44, as part of the Dominican Republic team tour before the Pan American Games.

Paulino took her third consecutive gold in 100 m at the Dominican Republic National Championships when she took the win with an 11.55 mark and timed 23.41 to win the 200 m gold medal in a tournament that served as a qualifier for the Pan American Games and the World Championship. At the Colombian city of Cali, she took part at the Grand Prix Valle de Oro Puro, winning the 100 m gold medal with a time of 11.48 and with 23.19, she also won the 200 m.

During the preliminary rounds of the 100 metres at the 2019 Pan American Gamesshe set a time of 11.84 and ranked in 14th place not qualifying for the semifinals. And during the 200 metres she ran 23.40 during the semifinals, qualifying for the finals but ended up in seventh place when she recorded a 23.29 in the final.

She traveled to the World Championships instead of pursuing a medal, hoping to make the qualifying marks for the 2020 Olympics. She represented her country taking part of the 200 metres competition and had a faster looser qualifier with a 23.04 mark in the first round, and a season best of 23.03 in the semifinals, not qualifying for the finals.

Paulino was part of Dominican representative at the Military World Games with the best performance ever when they collected two silver and two bronze medals. She participated in the 200 m, qualifying with a 23.58 in the heats, 23.46 in the semifinals and registering 23.18 in the final, winning the silver medal.

=== 2020 ===
Paulino was awarded her National Federation Athlete of the Year. After her 2019 success in the Dominican Republic Military Games, she was in charge of taking the sports oath in the inauguration of the 2020 edition. During 2020, she and her coach focused on the 400 m.

=== 2021 ===
She competed in her home country at the Isaac Ogando Festival, running a 400 m 50.31 and tournament's gold medal. This mark gave her an Olympic spot for Tokyo 2020, surpassing the required 51.22 mark.

During the Colombian National Senior Championships she won the 400 m gold medal when she ran 50.36 and another gold with the 4 × 400 m relay with Anabel Medina, Milagros Durán and Fiodaliza Cofil, with 3:30.02,. She also ran 23.10 in the 200 m.

The Dominican Republic participated at the World Athletics Relays and Paulino was part of the Mixed 4 × 400 metres relay and they qualified to the final round with a 3:16.67 mark and qualified for the 2020 Olympic Game and the 2022 World Championships and later won with her team the bronze medal with 3:17.58.

During the Meeting International Città di Savona, in Italy, she beat the meeting record winning the gold medal with a 50.71 and later lower her national record during the Meeting Jaen Paraiso Interior, Andujar, Spain with a tournament and national record of 50.25. She continued the warm-up season at the Meeting International de Montreuil, World Athletics bronze level series in Montreuil, France, setting a new meeting record with 50.66 in 400 m just before competing in the Meeting Iberoamericano de Atletismo Huelva, Spain, a European Athletics Outdoor Permit Meetings where she set a tournament record and another national record in the 400 m with 49.99. Back in the Dominican Republic, she set a new 200 m national record at the Félix Sánchez Invitational when she raced a 22:86 time.

In her first Olympic competition, she teamed up with Lidio Andrés Feliz, Anabel Medina, Luguelín Santos and Alexander Ogando for the mixed 4 × 400 metres relay where they set a national record of 3:12.74 during the heats, with Paulino being the fastest woman during that preliminary with 49.60, before setting a new national record in the finals to win the event's silver medal with 3:10.21, running her leg in 48.7 seconds. Paulino and Anabel Medina became the first female athletes for her home country ever to win an Olympic medal. She then headed for the 400 metres where she timed 50.06 during the heats, the quickest time in a global tournament for a preliminary round ever. During the semifinal round, she set a new national record with 49.38 to qualify for the finals. She ran a national record 49.20 to win the silver medal. She became the first Dominican athlete to ever win more than one medal in a single edition of the Olympic Games. She made herself recipient of bonuses from the government, a local supermarket chain, and a house from the CEO of a radio station.

Paulino participated in the 2021 Diamond League, winning at 2021 Athletissima in Lausanne, Switzerland with a 50.40 mark and also winning Meeting de Paris with 50.12, qualifying for the Diamond League Finals, the Weltklasse Zürich where she was the favorite. She ran 49.96 to settle with the silver medal and a US$12,000 cash price, after finishing behind American Quanera Hayes. On 14 September 2021, Paulino surpassed Shaunae Miller-Uibo as world number one in the World Athletics 400m world rankings.

During the annual observance of the National Hispanic Heritage Month, she was nominated by fellow singer and songwriter Natti Natasha for television programs Good Morning America and ABC News "GMA" Inspiration List as an influential Latina.

=== 2022 ===
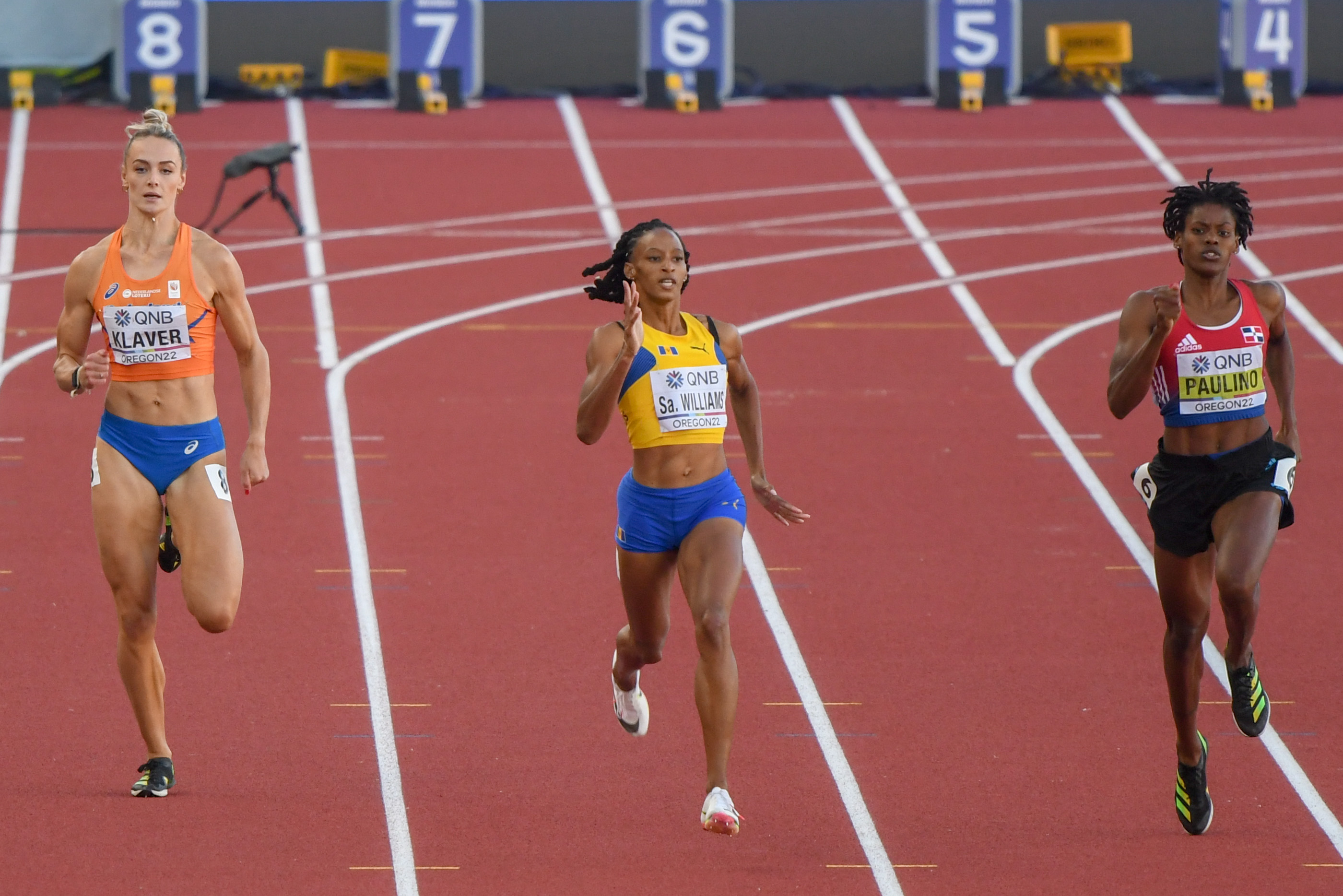
Paulino (far right) in the 400 m final of the 2022 World Athletics Championships in Eugene

She won the 200 m silver medal in the 16th Annual Spring Break Classic held in Carolina, Puerto Rico, setting a new national record when she registered 22.70. Paulino broke her 200 m record again during the 11° Meeting International Citta' Di Savona winning the gold with a 22.59 mark. As one of the 2022 Ibero-American Championships favorites, Paulino set a 400 m Ibero-American Championship record and world leading time of 49.49 for the gold medal, breaking the 50.65 from the Ana Guevara's 1998 mark, also winning the gold in the 4 × 100 m with Martha Méndez, Anabel Medina and Fiordaliza Cofil, with a winning time of 43.81. She won the National Championship in 200 m running in Bayaguana a new national record with 22.36, soon after that, she became brand ambassador for Banco Popular Dominicano.

Paulino won the World Championships 4 × 400 m relay gold medal, setting with her national team the second-fastest time ever, 3:09.82, she ran her leg in 48.47. Paulino and Cofil became the first women medallist in a World Championship. About overtaking and winning to American Allyson Felix in their last race, Paulino said that [Felix] will always be the best in the world, and that she has paved the way for them. Paulino claimed the silver medal at the individual 400 m competition with a 49.60 time.

After winning the 2022 Diamond League 4 × 100 m events held in Doha, Rabat and Laussane, she qualified for the finals, winning with a national record and world leading time of 48.99 to take the Diamond Trophy. She became just the 12th woman in history to break the 49-second barrier.

=== 2023 ===
At the Puerto Rican Annual Spring Break Classic, she won the 300 m setting a time of 35.16s, a meeting record and an all-time seventh fastest time. Paulino won the 400 m competition at the National Military Games with a 50.33 mark. She won the 200 m gold medal and National championship, running the distance in 23:09. In May, Paulino became the 400 m World Rankings No. 1 and later set a World Lead and a new 400 m national record with 48.98 running the USATF Los Angeles Grand Prix. She was chosen brand ambassador by Panam Sports as one of eleven athletes who stand in and out the court, representing the Olympic values.

She participated in the Central American and Caribbean Games, winning the gold medal in the 400 m with 49.95, a new meeting record and Olympic berth. After winning, she expressed how important was to be seen like a queen by the Dominican young people, because they feel hope because of her. She also took the 4 × 400 m relay silver and national record 3:27.84 and the 4 × 100 m bronze medal with 43.45. She also was among the team for the mixed 4 × 100 m who won the gold medal, but she did not run. When her fellow Central American and Caribbean Games champion, high jumper Marysabel Senyu, was subject to public scrutiny, Paulino twitted asking to end discrimination of athletes for their skin color.

At the 2023 Pan American Games, Paulino earned four medals, winning the gold medal in mixed relay and the 200 m with 22.74, she took the bronze at 4 × 100 metres relay and the silver in 4 × 400 metres.

=== 2024 ===
At the 2024 Summer Olympics, Paulino won the women's 400 m final gold medal. In her victory run, Paulino also set a new Olympic record after taking victory with a time of 48.17.

In October 2024, it was announced that she had signed up for the inaugural season of the Michael Johnson founded Grand Slam Track.

=== 2025 ===
The 2025 World Athletics Championships held in Tokyo pitted 4 of the fastest women to ever run the 400 meters against each other: Paulino, Sydney McLaughlin-Levrone, Salwa Eid Naser and Nickisha Pryce. The finals put Paulino in lane 9, the far outside. Naser got 7, McLaughlin-Levrone in 5. The track still wet from earlier rain. Down the backstretch, the top three had already separated from the rest of the field. McLaughlin-Levrone had a slight edge over Paulino then Nasser. The positioning held through the turn and when they hit the straightaway, McLaughlin-Levrone only had a metre on the fast closing Paulino who only had another metre on Naser. Both McLaughlin-Levrone and Naser running disciplined form hard to the finish, Paulino twisting, over-striding and gaining slightly on McLaughlin-Levrone until giving up the fight the last few steps when it was clear it wouldn't be enough.

McLaughlin-Levrone's 47.78 broke the Championship record, the North American record Paulino had set at the Olympics and her own American record from two days earlier. It was the second best time in history, only .18 off that world record. Paulino's 47.98 was the third best time in history.

== Achievements ==
All information taken from World Athletics profile.

=== International competitions ===
Representing Dominican Republic
| Year | Competition | Venue | Position | Event | Time |
|---|---|---|---|---|---|
| 2016 | Ibero-American Championships | Rio de Janeiro, Brazil | 5th | 4 × 100 m relay | 44.56 |
| 2016 | NACAC U23 Championships | San Salvador, El Salvador | 5th | 100 m | 11.98 |
| 2016 | NACAC U23 Championships | San Salvador, El Salvador | 6th | 200 m | 24.00 w |
| 2017 | Summer Universiade | Taipei, Taiwan | 11th (sf) | 200 m | 23.95 |
| 2017 | Summer Universiade | Taipei, Taiwan | (h) | 4 × 100 m relay | DQ |
| 2018 | CAC Games | Barranquilla, Colombia | 4th | 100 m | 11.33 w |
| 2018 | CAC Games | Barranquilla, Colombia | 4th | 200 m | 23.04 |
| 2018 | CAC Games | Barranquilla, Colombia | 3rd | 4 × 100 m relay | 43.68 |
| 2019 | Pan American Games | Lima, Peru | 14th (sf) | 100 m | 11.84 |
| 2019 | Pan American Games | Lima, Peru | 7th | 200 m | 23.29 |
| 2019 | World Championships | Doha, Qatar | 17th (sf) | 200 m | 23.03 SB |
| 2019 | Military World Games | Wuhan, China | 2nd | 200 m | 23.18 |
| 2021 | World Relays | Chorzów, Poland | 3rd | 4 × 400 m mixed | 3:17.58 |
| 2021 | Olympic Games | Tokyo, Japan | 2nd | 400 m | 49.20 NR |
| 2021 | Olympic Games | Tokyo, Japan | 2nd | 4 × 400 m mixed | 3:10.21 NR |
| 2022 | Ibero-American Championships | La Nucia, Spain | 1st | 400 m | 49.49 CR |
| 2022 | Ibero-American Championships | La Nucia, Spain | 1st | 4 × 100 m relay | 43.81 SB |
| 2022 | World Championships | Eugene, OR, United States | 2nd | 400 m | 49.60 |
| 2022 | World Championships | Eugene, OR, United States | 1st | 4 × 400 m mixed | 3:09.82 WL NR |
| 2023 | Central American and Caribbean Games | San Salvador, El Salvador | 1st | 400 m | 49.95 |
| 2023 | Central American and Caribbean Games | San Salvador, El Salvador | 3rd | 4 × 100 m relay | 43.45 |
| 2023 | Central American and Caribbean Games | San Salvador, El Salvador | 2nd | 4 × 400 m relay | 3:27.84 |
| 2023 | World Championships | Budapest, Hungary | 1st | 400 m | 48.76 NR |
| 2023 | Pan American Games | Santiago, Chile | 1st | 200 m | 22.74 |
| 2023 | Pan American Games | Santiago, Chile | 3rd | 4 × 100 m relay | 44.32 |
| 2023 | Pan American Games | Santiago, Chile | 2nd | 4 × 400 m relay | 3:34.27 |
| 2024 | Olympic Games | Paris, France | 1st | 400 m | 48.17 AR OR |
| 2025 | World Championships | Tokyo, Japan | 2nd | 400 m | 47.98 NR |
| 2026 | Central American and Caribbean Games | Santo Domingo, Dominican Republic | 1st | 400 m | 48.94 GR |
| 2026 | Central American and Caribbean Games | Santo Domingo, Dominican Republic | 1st | 4 × 400 m mixed | 3:10.57 GR |
| 2026 | World Ultimate Championship | Budapest, Hungary | 1st | 400 m | 49.07 |

=== Circuit performances ===
Grand Slam Track results
| Slam | Race group | Event | Pl. | Time | Prize money |
|---|---|---|---|---|---|
| 2025 Kingston Slam | Long sprints | 200 m | 2nd | 22.93 | US$30,000 |
| 2025 Kingston Slam | Long sprints | 400 m | 3rd | 49.35 | US$30,000 |
| 2025 Miami Slam | Long sprints | 400 m | 1st | 49.21 | US$100,000 |
| 2025 Miami Slam | Long sprints | 200 m | 1st | 22.30 | US$100,000 |
| 2025 Philadelphia Slam | Long sprints | 400 m | 1st | 49.12 | US$100,000 |
| 2025 Philadelphia Slam | Long sprints | 200 m | 1st | 22.46 | US$100,000 |

==== Wins and titles ====
- Diamond League 400 m champion: 2022 2023, 2024, 2026

400 metres wins, other events specified in parentheses

- 2021 (2): Lausanne Athletissima, Paris Meeting
- 2022 (4): Doha Diamond League (SB), Rabat Meeting International, Lausanne, Zürich Weltklasse (NR)
- 2023 (4): Doha, Paris (MR), Xiamen Diamond League (MR), Eugene Prefontaine Classic
- 2024 (6): Xiamen, Yangtze Delta Athletics Diamond Gala, Oslo Bislett Games, Paris, Kamila Skolimowska Memorial (MR), Memorial Van Damme
- 2025 (3): Paris (MR), Herculis, Silesia
- 2026 (6): Doha (MR), Paris (DLR), Monaco (MR), London Athletics Meet, Silesia, Brussels (MR)

| Preceded by (The Bahamas) Shaunae Miller-Uibo | Women's 400 m North and Central American record holder 9 August 2024 – 18 September 2025 | Succeeded by (United States) Sydney McLaughlin-Levrone |

Olympic Games
| Preceded by Rodrigo Marte; Prisilla Rivera | Flag bearer for Dominican Republic; Paris 2024 with Audrys Nin Reyes | Succeeded by Incumbent |
