= Dominican Republic at the 1983 World Championships in Athletics =

- Flag of Dominican Republic
- WA code: DOM

in Helsinki, Finland August 7–14, 1983
- Competitors: 5 (4 men and 1 woman) in 5 events
- Medals: Gold 0 Silver 0 Bronze 0 Total 0

World Championships in Athletics appearances
- 1983; 1987; 1991; 1993; 1995; 1997; 1999; 2001; 2003; 2005; 2007; 2009; 2011; 2013; 2015; 2017; 2019; 2022; 2023

The Dominican Republic competed at the 1983 World Championships in Athletics in Helsinki, Finland, from August 7 to 14, 1983.

== Men ==
Track and road events

Athlete	Event	Heat		Quarterfinal		Semifinal		Final	
Athlete	Event	Result	Rank	Result	Rank	Result	Rank	Result	Rank
Wilfredo Almonte	100 metres	10.72	38	Did not advance					
Juan Núñez	100 metres	10.38 CR	13 Q	10.39	11 Q	10.36	4 Q	10.29	5
Juan Núñez	200 metres	Did not start		Did not advance					
Modesto Castillo	110 metres hurdles	13.93	16	—		14.23	13	Did not advance	

Field events

Athlete	Event	Qualification		Final	
Athlete	Event	Distance	Position	Distance	Position
Wilfredo Almonte	Long jump	7.38	26	Did not advance	

== Women ==
Track and road events

Athlete	Event	Heat		Semifinal		Final	
Athlete	Event	Result	Rank	Result	Rank	Result	Rank
Felicia Candelario	400 metres hurdles	1:00.72	30	Did not advance			
