= Yon Soriano =

Dominican Republic sprinter

Personal information
- Full name: Yon Manuel Soriano
- Born: 2 January 1987 (age 39) Guaymate, La Romana, Dominican Republic
- Height: 1.70 m (5 ft 7 in)
- Weight: 68 kg (150 lb)

Sport
- Country: Dominican Republic
- Sport: Athletics
- Events: Sprint and Middle-distance running
- Updated on 20 August 2015

Yon Manuel Soriano (born 2 January 1987) is a Dominican Republic sprinter. He competed in the 4 × 400 m relay event at the 2012 Summer Olympics.

Soriano was born in Guaymate, La Romana Province.

== Personal bests ==
- 400 m: 45.66 A – San José, Costa Rica, 7 August 2015
- 4 × 400 m: 3:01.73 – San José, Costa Rica, 9 August 2015

== International competitions ==
Year	Competition	Venue	Position	Event	Notes
Representing the Dominican Republic
2014	Ibero-American Championships	São Paulo, Brazil	5th	400m	47.37
2014	Central American and Caribbean Games	Xalapa, Mexico	7th	400m	46.73
2014	Central American and Caribbean Games	Xalapa, Mexico	4th	4 × 400 m relay	3:02.86 A
2015	NACAC Championships	San José, Costa Rica	8th	400m	46.53
2015	NACAC Championships	San José, Costa Rica	4th	4 × 400 m relay	3:01.73
2015	World Championships	Beijing, China	10th (h)	4 × 400 m relay	3:00.15 NR
2016	Ibero-American Championships	Rio de Janeiro, Brazil	2nd	4 × 400 m relay	3:03.43
2016	Olympic Games	Rio de Janeiro, Brazil	10th (h)	4 × 400 m relay	3:01.76
