= Ana José Tima =

Dominican Republic triple jumper

Personal information
- Nationality: Dominican
- Born: Ana José Tima; 10 October 1989 (age 37)

Sport
- Sport: Track and Field
- Event: Triple jump

Ana Lucia José Tima (born October 10, 1989) is a triple jumper from the Dominican Republic. She competed at the 2016 Summer Olympics in the women's triple jump; her result of 13.61 meters in the qualifying round did not qualify her for the final. She improved her mark to 14.11 meters at the 2020 Summer Olympics in Tokyo, but was again unable to qualify for the final.

Grenadan Olympic sprinter Richard Britton served as Tima's coach and helped her qualify for the 2020 Olympics.
