= List of Dominican Republic records in athletics =

The following are the national records in athletics in the Dominican Republic maintained by Federación Dominicana de Atletismo (FDA). So far FDA maintains an official list only in outdoor events.

== Outdoor ==
Key to tables: Awaiting ratification Record not kept by FDAA Not ratified or later rescined by FDAA

=== Men ===
Event	Record	Athlete	Date	Meet	Place	Ref.	Video
100 m	10.04 (+1.7 m/s)	José González	27 May 2023	Meeting National de la Martinique	Fort-de-France, Martinique		
150 m (straight)	14.86 (+0.3 m/s)	Alexander Ogando	18 May 2024	Atlanta City Games	Atlanta, United States		
200 m	19.86 (+0.6 m/s)	Alexander Ogando	25 August 2024	Kamila Skolimoswka Memorial	Chorzów, Poland		
200 m	19.86 (+1.7 m/s)	Alexander Ogando	2 May 2025	Miami Slam	Miramar, United States		
400 m	44.11	Luguelín Santos	26 August 2015	World Championships	Beijing, China		
600 m	1:15.15	Luguelín Santos	7 March 2015		San Germán, Puerto Rico		
800 m	1:44.14	Raynier Galvez	24 April 2026	John McDonnell Invitational	Fayetteville, United States		
1500 m	3:43.57	Isidro Pimentel	30 March 2002		Stanford, United States		
Mile	4:07.42	Jose Zayas	13 June 2001		Holmdel, United States		
3000 m	8:22.27	Alvaro Abreu	28 January 2016	Torneo Apertura	Mar del Plata, Argentina		
5000 m	14:01.05 (Note: ratified by FDAA but not recognised by World Athletics due to illegal pacing)	Alvaro Abreu	17 April 2021		San Juan, Puerto Rico		
5000 m	14:07.38	Alvaro Abreu	21 May 2021	Trials of Miles NYC Qualifier	New York City, United States		
5 km (road)	14:45+	Álvaro Abreu	17 October 2020	World Half Marathon Championships	Gdynia, Poland		
10,000 m	30:25.51	Domingo Batista	4 July 1988		Puerto Ordaz, Venezuela		
10,000 m	30:20.35	Álvaro Abreu	13 June 2021		Carolina, Puerto Rico		
10,000 m	30:17.03 (Note: not ratified by FDAA but recognised by World Athletics)	Amaury Rodríguez	25 February 2022		Santo Domingo, Dominican Republic		
10 km (road)	29:52+	Álvaro Abreu	17 October 2020	World Half Marathon Championships	Gdynia, Poland		
15 km (road)	45:15+	Álvaro Abreu	17 October 2020	World Half Marathon Championships	Gdynia, Poland		
20 km (road)	1:00:49+	Álvaro Abreu	17 October 2020	World Half Marathon Championships	Gdynia, Poland		
Half marathon	1:02:48	Álvaro Abreu	2 August 2026	CAC Games	Santo Domingo, Dominican Republic		
Marathon	2:14:30	Alvaro Abreu	15 January 2023	Houston Marathon	Houston, United States		
110 m hurdles	13.61 NWI	Modesto Castillo	17 July 1984		San Juan, Puerto Rico		
200 m hurdles (straight)	22.61 (+1.4 m/s)	Félix Sánchez	17 May 2014	Manchester City Games	Manchester, United Kingdom		
300 m hurdles	34.94	Yeral Nuñez	1 April 2023	Felix Sánchez Classic	Santo Domingo, Dominican Republic		
400 m hurdles	47.25	Félix Sánchez	29 August 2003	World Championships	Saint-Denis, France		
3000 m steeplechase	8:38.0 h	Alvaro Abreu	2 March 2017		San Germán, Puerto Rico		
High jump	2.24 m	Julio Luciano	8 June 1996		Santo Domingo, Dominican Republic		
High jump	2.28 m (Note: not ratified by FDAA but recognised by World Athletics)	Julio Luciano	31 May 1997		Santo Domingo, Dominican Republic		
Pole vault	5.20 m	Jorge Montes	29 June 2024	Dominican Championships	Santo Domingo, Dominican Republic		
Pole vault	5.20 m	Jorge Montes	6 August 2026	CAC Games	Santo Domingo, Dominican Republic		
Long jump	7.96 m (+0.9 m/s)	Carlos Jorge	8 July 2006		Santo Domingo, Dominican Republic		
Triple jump	16.44 m (+0.9 m/s)	Juandel Bueno	1 April 2023	Felix Sánchez Classic	Santo Domingo, Dominican Republic		
Shot put	16.86 m (Note: not ratified by FDAA but recognised by World Athletics)	Juan de la Cruz	10 April 1986		San Germán, Puerto Rico		
Discus throw	58.09 m	Juan Infante	9 July 2011		Ponce, Puerto Rico		
Hammer throw	61.60 m (Note: not ratified by FDAA but recognised by World Athletics)	Andrés Polemir	26 May 1984		Santo Domingo, Dominican Republic		
Hammer throw	63.80 m (Note: falsified)	Andrés Polemir	5 August 1986		Santo Domingo, Dominican Republic		
Javelin throw	71.00 m (Note: not ratified by FDAA but recognised by World Athletics)	Daniel Alonzo	24 March 2000		Montclair, United States		
Decathlon	7518 pts	José Miguel Paulino	16–17 June 2017		Santo Domingo, Dominican Republic		
Decathlon	100m (wind) / Long jump (wind) / Shot put / High jump / 400m / 110m H (wind) / Discus / Pole vault / Javelin / 1500m; 10.85 (nw) / 7.14 m (nw) / 12.25 m / 1.91 m / 48.94 / 14.97 (nw) / 36.60 m / 4.20 m / 58.85 m / 4:32.05						
10,000 m walk (track)	43:09.50	Braylin Santana	22 May 2021		Santo Domingo, Dominican Republic		
20 km walk (road)	1:27:08	Jorge Méndez	20 May 2017		Santo Domingo, Dominican Republic		
20 km walk (road)	1:26:04	Ruddy Castillo	8 December 1977		Santo Domingo, Dominican Republic		
50 km walk (road)							
4 × 100 m relay	37.98	Dominican Republic; Franquelo Pérez; Yohandris Andújar; Melbin Marcelino; Yancarlos Martínez	6 August 2026	CAC Games	Santo Domingo, Dominican Republic		
4 × 200 m relay	1:27.2 h	A. de los Santos; M. Reyes; A. Fernández; R. Reyes	15 March 1975		Santiago de los Caballeros, Dominican Republic		
4 × 400 m relay	3:00.15	Dominican Republic; Gustavo Cuesta; Yon Soriano; Juander Santos; Luguelín Santos	29 August 2015	World Championships	Beijing, China		
Sprint medley relay (2,2,4,8)	3:21.03	Dominican Republic; Christopher Valdez (200 m); Leonel Bonon (200 m); Yon Soriano (400 m); Tayron Reyes (800 m)	29 April 2017	Penn Relays	Philadelphia, United States		

=== Women ===
Event	Record	Athlete	Date	Meet	Place	Ref.
60 m	7.13 (−0.6 m/s)	Liranyi Alonso	6 June 2026	Brothers Znamensky Memorial	Moscow, Russia	
100 m	11.04 (−0.8 m/s)	Liranyi Alonso	1 August 2025	Dominican Championships	Bayaguana, Dominican Republic	
200 m	22.30 (+1.0 m/s)	Marileidy Paulino	4 May 2025	Miami Slam	Miramar, United States	
300 m	35.16	Marileidy Paulino	17 March 2023	Annual Spring Break Classic	Carolina, United States	
400 m	47.98	Marileidy Paulino	18 September 2025	World Championships	Tokyo, Japan	
600 m	1:30.56	Lilian Reyes	1 April 2023	Felix Sánchez Classic	Santo Domingo, Dominican Republic	
800 m	2:03.61	Alexis Panisse	30 May 2014		Jacksonville, United States	
1500 m	4:18.72	María Mancebo	12 May 2012	Ponce Grand Prix	Ponce, Puerto Rico	
3000 m	9:25.60	María Mancebo	14 May 2014		Ponce, Puerto Rico	
5000 m	16:22.28	Maria Mancebo	11 April 2014		Ponce, Puerto Rico	
10,000 m	33:58.79	Andreina de la Rosa	17 June 2017		Santo Domingo, Dominican Republic	
Half marathon	1:17:36	Sandra Natal	17 September 1995		Philadelphia, United States	
Marathon	2:43:26	Soranyi Rodriguez	24 November 2019	Maraton Monumental Primer Santiago de America	Santiago de los Caballeros, Dominican Republic	
100 m hurdles	12.77 (+1.8 m/s)	LaVonne Idlette	8 June 2013	2nd Star Athletics Sprint Series Meet	Montverde, United States	
300 m hurdles	41.52	Franchina Martinez	1 April 2023	Felix Sánchez Classic	Santo Domingo, Dominican Republic	
400 m hurdles	57.08 A	Yolanda Osana	26 October 2011	Pan American Games	Guadalajara, Mexico	
3000 m steeplechase	9:45.84	María Mancebo	1 August 2014	Ibero-American Championships	São Paulo, Brazil	
High jump	1.97 m	Juana Arrendel	2 December 2002	Central American and Caribbean Games	San Salvador, El Salvador	
Pole vault	3.95 m	Alejandra Mota	15 May 2021	Spanish Club Championships	Pamplona, Spain	
Long jump	6.63 m (±0.0 m/s)	Evelina Minaya	31 March 2026	Festival Deportivo de la Mujer Dominicana	Bayaguana, Dominican Republic	
Triple jump	14.52 m (+0.5 m/s)	Ana José Tima	16 July 2022	World Championships	Eugene, United States	
Shot put	18.14 m	Fior Vásquez	8 August 2003	Pan American Games	Santo Domingo, Dominican Republic	
Discus throw	53.20 m	Maria Matos	10 May 2009		Philadelphia, United States	
Hammer throw	61.77 m	Maria Garcia	28 April 2004		West Point, United States	
Javelin throw	54.95 m	Yesi Tejeda	4 August 2026	CAC Games	Santo Domingo, Dominican Republic	
Heptathlon	5860 pts	Juana Castillo	27–28 May 2006	Ibero-American Championships	Ponce, Puerto Rico	
Heptathlon	100m H (wind) / High jump / Shot put / 200m (wind) / Long jump (wind) / Javelin / 800m; 14.10 / 1.66 m / 13.09 m / 25.07 / 5.92 m / 43.64 m / 2:13.46					
5000 m walk (track)	25:00.03	Andreina Gonzales Guzman	16 March 2013		Santo Domingo, Dominican Republic	
10,000 m walk (track)	50:30.33	Andreina Gonzales Guzman	7 April 2016		Santiago de los Caballeros, Dominican Republic	
20 km walk (road)	1:42:41	Andreina Gonzales	13 May 2017	Pan American Race Walking Cup	Lima, Peru	
50 km walk (road)						
4 × 100 m relay	43.00	Dominican Republic; Patricia Sine; Fiordaliza Cofil; Liranyi Alonso; Estrella De Aza	6 August 2026	CAC Games	Santo Domingo, Dominican Republic	
4 × 400 m relay	3:27.84	Dominican Republic; Mariana Perez; Anabel Medina; Franshina Martinez; Marileidy Paulino	7 July 2023	Central American and Caribbean Games	San Salvador, El Salvador	

=== Mixed ===
Event	Record	Athlete	Date	Meet	Place	Ref.
4 × 100 m relay	40.89	Dominican Republic; Mayobanex de Óleo; Fiordaliza Cofil; José González; Liranyi Alonso	4 August 2026	CAC Games	Santo Domingo, Dominican Republic	
4 × 400 m relay	3:09.82	Dominican Republic; Lidio Andrés Feliz; Marileidy Paulino; Alexander Ogando; Fiordaliza Cofil	15 July 2022	World Championships	Eugene, United States	

== Indoor ==
=== Men ===
Event	Record	Athlete	Date	Meet	Place	Ref.	Video
60 m	6.70	Christopher Valdez	26 January 2018	Dr. Norb Sander Invitational	New York City, United States		
200 m	20.24	Alexander Ogando	8 February 2026	Pre France individuels NOR	Val-de-Reuil, France		
300 m	33.16	Luguelín Santos	25 January 2018	Czech Indoor Gala	Ostrava, Czech Republic		
400 m	45.80	Luguelín Santos	24 February 2017	Meeting Ville de Madrid	Madrid, Spain		
600 m	1:16.01	Luguelín Santos	21 February 2015	Hershey Canadian Open Championships	Montreal, Canada		
800 m	1:46.74	Luis Peralta	11 February 2024	Millrose Games	New York City, United States		
1000 m	2:19.70	Luis Peralta	19 January 2024	NYC Gotham Cup	Staten Island, United States		
1500 m	3:51.01	Lorenzo Jiménez	3 February 2015		Antequera, Spain		
3000 m	8:24.03	Jose Zayas	26 December 1999		New York City, United States		
60 m hurdles	7.75	Ramon Sosa	6 February 2009	New Balance Collegiate Invitational	New York City, United States		
60 m hurdles	7.75	Ramon Sosa	4 March 2016		New York City, United States		
60 m hurdles	7.75	Ramon Sosa	2 February 2018	Crimson Elite	Cambridge, United States		
400 m hurdles	49.73	Félix Sánchez	6 February 2010	Meeting National	Val-de-Reuil, France		
High jump	1.96 m	Stiward Pena	23 February 2014		Magglingen, Switzerland		
Pole vault	4.20 m	David Pineda	30 January 2016		Valladolid, Spain		
Long jump	7.33 m	Carlos Jorge	26 January 2007		Budapest, Hungary		
Triple jump	15.32 m	Jeudi Brito	7 February 2009		Pergine Valsugana, Italy		
Shot put							
Heptathlon							
Heptathlon	60m / Long jump / Shot put / High jump / 60m H / Pole vault / 1000m						
5000 m walk							
4 × 400 m relay	3:06.30	Dominican Republic; Arismendy Peguero; Alvin Harrison; Félix Sánchez; Yoel Tapia	13 March 2010	World Championships	Doha, Qatar		

=== Women ===
Event	Record	Athlete	Date	Meet	Place	Ref.
50 m	6.53	Mariely Sánchez	31 January 2013	K of C Games	Saskatoon, Canada	
60 m	7.31	Liranyi Alonso	14 February 2025	Tyson Invitational	Fayetteville, United States	
200 m	23.82	Marileidy Paulino	3 February 2018	Villanova Invitational	Staten Island, United States	
400 m	55.26	Libia Jackson	28 January 2006		State College, United States	
800 m	2:05.38	Alexis Panisse	1 March 2014		College Station, United States	
1500 m	4:24.98+	Alexis Panisse	6 February 2016		New York City, United States	
Mile	4:39.53	Alexis Panisse	28 February 2014		College Station, United States	
3000 m	9:35.05	Alexis Panisse	8 February 2014		College Station, United States	
60 m hurdles	8.16	LaVonne Idlette	7 March 2014	World Championships	Sopot, Poland	
High jump	1.88 m	Juana Arrendel	2 February 2003	Sparkassen Cup	Stuttgart, Germany	
Pole vault	3.92 m	Mariely Mota	8 February 2020		Zaragoza, Spain	
Pole vault	3.92 m	Mariely Mota	23 February 2020		Madrid, Spain	
Long jump	5.93 m	Estefania García	15 February 2014		Magglingen, Switzerland	
Triple jump	13.54 m	Ana José Tima	2 July 2019		Atlanta, United States	
Shot put	14.55 m	Rosa Ramirez	21 February 2020		New York City, United States	
Pentathlon	3677 pts	Estefania García	7 February 2016		Magglingen, Switzerland	
Pentathlon	60m H / High jump / Shot put / Long jump / 800m; 8.87 / 1.56 m / 12.48 m / 5.58 m / 2:34.75					
3000 m walk						
4 × 400 m relay						
