= Lidio Andrés Feliz =

Dominican Republic sprinter

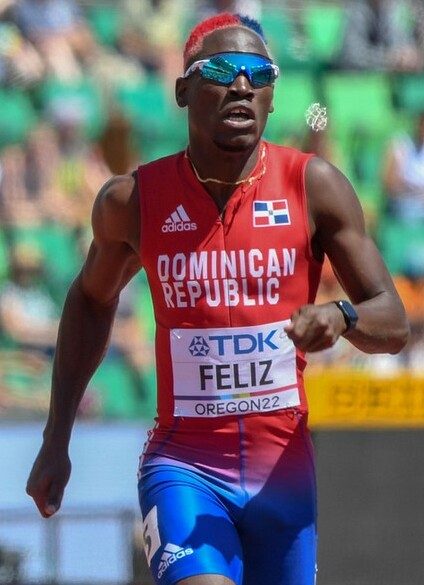
- Feliz at the 2022 World Athletics Championships in Eugene

Personal information
- Born: 26 June 1997 (age 29) Barahona, Dominican Republic

Sport
- Country: Dominican Republic
- Sport: Track and field
- Event: 400 metres
Medal record
Men's athletics
Representing the Dominican Republic
Olympic Games
Silver medal – second place	2020 Tokyo	4 × 400 m mixed
World Championships
Gold medal – first place	2022 Eugene	4 × 400 m mixed
World Relays
Bronze medal – third place	2021 Chorzów	4 × 400 m mixed

Lidio Andrés Feliz (born 26 June 1997) is a sprinter from the Dominican Republic. He won three major medals as part of Dominican mixed 4 × 400 metres relays, including silver at the 2020 Tokyo Olympics and gold at the 2022 World Athletics Championships.

Feliz claimed the gold medal in the 400 metres at the 2022 Ibero-American Championships in Athletics.

== Achievements ==
=== International competitions ===
Representing Dominican Republic
Year	Competition	Venue	Position	Event	Time
2018	CAC Games	Barranquilla, Colombia	7th	400 m	46.19
2019	Pan American Games	Lima, Peru	11th (sf)	400 m	46.76
2019	Military World Games	Wuhan, China	3rd (h3)	400 m	23.18
2019	Military World Games	Wuhan, China	3rd	4 × 100 m relay	39.54
2021	World Relays	Chorzów, Poland	3rd	4 × 400 m mixed	3:17.58
2021	Olympic Games	Tokyo, Japan	2nd	4 × 400 m mixed	3:10.21 NR
2022	Ibero-American Championships	La Nucia, Spain	1st	400 m	44.64 CR
2022	Ibero-American Championships	La Nucia, Spain	1st	4 × 400 m relay	3:00.98 SB
2022	World Championships	Eugene, OR, United States	22nd (sf)	400 m	46.19
2022	World Championships	Eugene, OR, United States	1st	4 × 400 m mixed	3:09.82 WL NR
2023	Central American and Caribbean Games	San Salvador, El Salvador	5th	400 m	45.40
2023	Central American and Caribbean Games	San Salvador, El Salvador	3rd	4 × 400 m relay	3:02.19
2025	World Championships	Tokyo, Japan	35th (h)	200 m	20.63
2025	Bolivarian Games	Lima, Peru	4th	100 m	21.10
2025	Bolivarian Games	Lima, Peru	2nd	4 × 100 m relay	39.20
2025	Bolivarian Games	Lima, Peru	3rd	4 × 400 m relay	3:06.52
2026	Central American and Caribbean Games	Santo Domingo, Dominican Republic	10th (h)	400 m	46.03
2026	Central American and Caribbean Games	Santo Domingo, Dominican Republic	2nd	4 × 400 m relay	3:00.94

=== Personal bests ===
- 100 metres – 10.45 (0.0 m/s, Santo Domingo 2021)
- 200 metres – 20.33 (+0.8 m/s, Bayaguana 2021)
- 400 metres – 44.64 (La Nucia 2022)
