= Athletics Federation of the Dominican Republic =

National sports governing body

- Federación Dominicana de Asociaciones de Atletismo
- Sport: Athletics
- Jurisdiction: Federation
- Abbreviation: FDAA
- Founded: March 21, 1953
- Affiliation: IAAF
- Affiliation date: December 18, 1953
- Regional affiliation: NACAC
- Headquarters: Santo Domingo
- President: Gerardo Suero Correa
- Vice president: Gregorio Ramirez
- Secretary: Mariano Cedeño

Official website
- fedoatletismo.org
- (Dominican Republic)

The Athletics Federation of the Dominican Republic (Spanish: Federación Dominicana de Asociaciones de Atletismo, FDAA) is the governing body for the sport of athletics in Dominican Republic. The current president is Gerardo Suero Correa. He was elected in November 2010 for the period 2010-2014.

== History ==
FDAA was founded on March 21, 1953 and was affiliated to the IAAF on December 18, 1953.

== Presidents ==
Starting with the foundation of FDAA in 1953, there were about nine presidents.

Name	Presidency
Manuel Joaquín Báez Vargas	1953-
Rafael Germes	1966-1974
Danilo Aquino	1974-1982
Dante Toribio	1982-1986
Radhames Brea	1986-1990
Álvaro Polimar	1992-2004
Ramon Merejo	2004-2005
José Rubio	2005-2010
Gerardo Suero Correa	2010-

== Affiliations ==
FDAA is the national member federation for Dominican Republic in the following international organisations:

- International Association of Athletics Federations (IAAF)
- North American, Central American and Caribbean Athletic Association (NACAC)
- Association of Panamerican Athletics (APA)
- Asociación Iberoamericana de Atletismo (AIA; Ibero-American Athletics Association)
- Central American and Caribbean Athletic Confederation (CACAC)

Moreover, it is part of the following national organisations:

- Dominican Republic Olympic Committee (COLIMDO; Comité Olímpico Dominicano)

== National records ==
FDAA maintains the Dominican records in athletics.
