= Alexander Ogando =

Dominican Republic sprinter

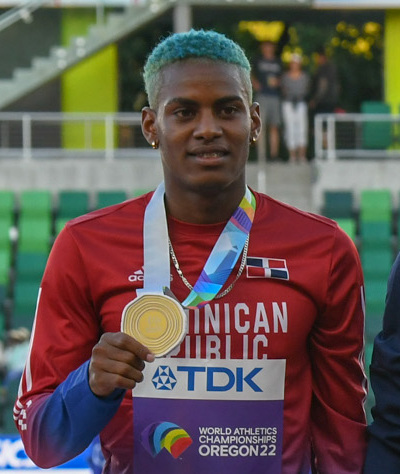
- Ogando at the 2022 World Athletics Championships in Eugene

Personal information
- Full name: Alexander Ogando Bautista
- Born: 3 May 2000 (age 26) San Juan de la Maguana, Dominican Republic
- Height: 185 cm (6 ft 1 in)

Sport
- Country: Dominican Republic
- Sport: Track and field
- Event: Sprints

Achievements and titles
- Personal bests: Outdoor; 100m: 10.09 (2025); 200m: 19.86 (2024) NR; 300m: 32.18 (2024) NR; 400m: 44.68 (2022); Indoor; 60m: 6.73 (2026); 200m: 20.24 (2026) NR; 400m: 46.54 (2026)
Medal record
Men's athletics
Representing the Dominican Republic
Olympic Games
| Silver medal – second place | 2020 Tokyo | 4 × 400 m mixed |
World Championships
| Gold medal – first place | 2022 Eugene | 4 × 400 m mixed |
World Relays
| Bronze medal – third place | 2021 Chorzów | 4 × 400 m mixed |
Central American and Caribbean Games
| Gold medal – first place | 2023 San Salvador | 200 m |
| Gold medal – first place | 2023 San Salvador | 4 × 400 mixed |
| Silver medal – second place | 2026 Santo Domingo | 200 m |
NACAC U23 Championships
| Gold medal – first place | 2021 San José | 200 m |

Alexander Ogando Bautista (born 3 May 2000) is a sprinter from the Dominican Republic. He finished fifth in the 200 metres at the 2022 World Athletics Championships. Ogando won three major medals as part of Dominican mixed 4 × 400 metres relays, including silver at the 2020 Tokyo Olympics and gold at the 2022 World Championships.

He claimed gold medals in the 200 m at the 2021 NACAC Under-23 Championships and 2022 Ibero-American Championships.

== Achievements ==
=== Circuit performances ===
Grand Slam Track results
| Slam | Race group | Event | Pl. | Time | Prize money |
|---|---|---|---|---|---|
| 2025 Miami Slam | Long sprints | 200 m | 2nd | 19.86 | US$30,000 |
| 2025 Miami Slam | Long sprints | 400 m | 5th | 44.78 | US$30,000 |
| 2025 Philadelphia Slam | Long sprints | 400 m | 6th | 45.87 | US$50,000 |
| 2025 Philadelphia Slam | Long sprints | 200 m | 1st | 20.13 | US$50,000 |

=== International competitions ===
Representing Dominican Republic
| Year | Competition | Venue | Position | Event | Time |
|---|---|---|---|---|---|
| 2019 | Pan American U20 Championships | San José, Costa Rica | – (h) | 200 m | DQ |
| 2021 | World Relays | Chorzów, Poland | 3rd | 4 × 400 m mixed | 3:17.58 |
| 2021 | NACAC U23 Championships | San José, Costa Rica | 1st | 200 m | 20.59 |
| 2021 | Olympic Games | Tokyo, Japan | 2nd | 4 × 400 m mixed | 3:10.21 NR |
| 2022 | Ibero-American Championships | La Nucia, Spain | 1st | 200 m | 20.27 |
| 2022 | Ibero-American Championships | La Nucia, Spain | 2nd | 4 × 100 m relay | 39.19 SB |
| 2022 | Ibero-American Championships | La Nucia, Spain | 1st | 4 × 400 m relay | 3:00.98 SB |
| 2022 | World Championships | Eugene, OR, United States | 5th | 200 m | 19.93 |
| 2022 | World Championships | Eugene, OR, United States | 1st | 4 × 400 m mixed | 3:09.82 WL NR |
| 2023 | Central American and Caribbean Games | San Salvador, El Salvador | 1st | 200 m | 19.99 |
| 2023 | World Championships | Budapest, Hungary | 7th | 200 m | 20.23 |
| 2024 | Olympic Games | Paris, France | 5th | 200 m | 20.02 |
| 2024 | Olympic Games | Paris, France | 22nd (h) | 400 m | 45.11 |
| 2025 | NACAC Championships | Freeport, Bahamas | 7th | 100 m | 10.34 |
| 2025 | World Championships | Tokyo, Japan | 6th | 200 m | 20.01 |
| 2025 | World Championships | Tokyo, Japan | 38th (h) | 400 m | 45.59 |
| 2026 | World Ultimate Championship | Budapest, Hungary | 16th (h) | 200 m | 20.64 |

=== Personal bests ===
- 100 metres – 10.09 (+0.9 m/s, Santo Domingo 2022) NR
- 200 metres – 19.86 (+0.6 m/s, Chorzów, Poland 2024) NR
- 400 metres – 44.68 (Chorzów 2022)
