= Aruba at the World Athletics Championships =

- WA code: ARU
- National federation: Aruba Athletic Federation
- Medals: Gold 0 Silver 0 Bronze 0 Total 0

World Athletics Championships appearances (overview)
- 1987; 1991; 1993; 1995; 1997; 1999; 2001–2009; 2011; 2013; 2015; 2017; 2019; 2022; 2023; 2025

Aruba has competed at the World Athletics Championships on eleven occasions. It did not send a delegation for the 1983 championships or the editions from 2001 to 2009. Its competing country code is ARU. The country has not won any medals at the competition and as of 2019 no Aruban athlete has reached the top eight of an event. Its best performance is by Cornelia Melis, who placed 21st in the 1991 women's marathon.

== 1991 ==
One athlete represented Aruba at the 1991 World Championships in Athletics: Cornelia Melis ran a time of 2:58:18 to finish 21st in the women's marathon.

Athlete	Event	Final	
Athlete	Event	Result	Rank
Cornelia Melis	Women's marathon	2:58:18	21st

== 1997 ==
One athlete represented Aruba at the 1997 World Championships in Athletics: Miguel Janssen ran a time of 10.47 to finish 56th overall in men's 100 metres heats.

Athlete	Event	Heat		Final	
Athlete	Event	Result	Rank	Result	Rank
Miguel Janssen	Men's 100 metres	10.47	56th	Did not advance	

== 2011 ==
Two athletes represented Aruba at the 2011 World Championships in Athletics. Geronimo Goeloe ran in the men's 100 metres, progressing beyond the preliminary round before being eliminated in the heats stage. Shariska Winterdal competed in the women's marathon, finishing in 46th place with a time of 3:49:48.

Athlete	Event	Preliminaries		Heats		Semifinals		Final	
Athlete	Event	Result	Rank	Result	Rank	Result	Rank	Result	Rank
Geronimo Goeloe	Men's 100 metres	10.73 SB	6 Q	10.84	47	Did not advance			
Shariska Winterdal	Women's marathon							3:49:48 SB	46

== 2013 ==
One athlete represented Aruba at the 2013 World Championships in Athletics: Quincy Breell cleared 7.10 m to finish 28th in men's long jump qualifying.

Athlete	Event	Qualifying		Final	
Athlete	Event	Result	Rank	Result	Rank
Quincy Breell	Men's long jump	7.10	28	Did not advance	

== 2015 ==
One athlete represented Aruba at the 2015 World Championships in Athletics: Quincy Breell failed to record a valid jump in men's long jump qualifying.

Athlete	Event	Qualifying		Final	
Athlete	Event	Result	Rank	Result	Rank
Quincy Breell	Men's long jump	NM		Did not advance	

== 2017 ==
One athlete represented at the 2017 World Championships in Athletics: Quincy Breell placed 31st in the men's long jump qualifying with a jump of 6.90 m.

Athlete	Event	Qualifying		Final	
Athlete	Event	Result	Rank	Result	Rank
Quincy Breell	Men's long jump	6.90	31	Did not advance	

== 2019 ==
One athlete represented Aruba at the 2019 World Athletics Championships: in the heats of the men's 5000 metres, Jonathan Busby struggled to finish the distance on his own and fellow competitor Braima Suncar Dabo of Guinea-Bissau helped him to the finish line, which ultimately resulted in his disqualification. Dabo's act of kindness was widely reported and the pair were present for Dabo receiving the International Fair Play Award at the World Athletics Awards later that year.

Athlete	Event	Heat		Final	
Athlete	Event	Result	Rank	Result	Rank
Jonathan Busby	Men's 5000 metres	DQ	—	Did not advance	
