= Athletics at the 2016 Summer Olympics – Men's long jump =

Men's long jump at the Games of the XXXI Olympiad
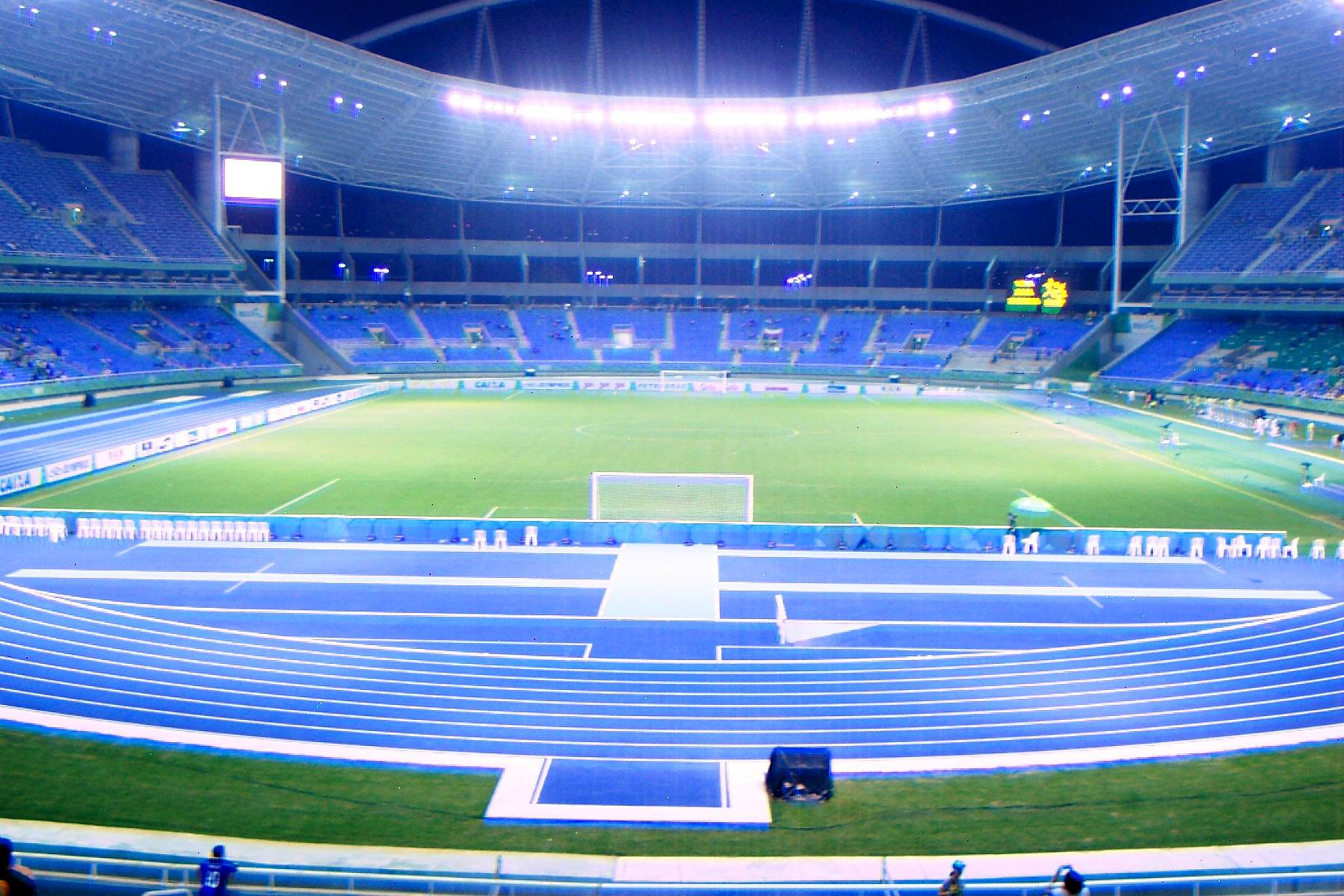
- Interior view of the Estádio Olímpico João Havelange, where the men's long jump took place.
- Venue: Olympic Stadium
- Dates: 12–13 August 2016
- Competitors: 32 from 23 nations
- Winning distance: 8.38

Medalists
1st place, gold medalist(s)		Jeff Henderson	United States
2nd place, silver medalist(s)		Luvo Manyonga	South Africa
3rd place, bronze medalist(s)		Greg Rutherford	Great Britain

Official Video Highlights

The men's long jump competition at the 2016 Summer Olympics in Rio de Janeiro, Brazil was held at the Olympic Stadium between 12 and 13 August. Thirty-two athletes from 23 nations competed. The event was won by 1 cm by Jeff Henderson of the United States, the nation's first gold medal in the event since 2004 and 22nd overall. Luvo Manyonga won South Africa's second silver medal in the men's long jump. Defending champion Greg Rutherford of Great Britain took bronze, becoming the tenth man to win a second medal in the event.

== Summary ==
The only two automatic qualifiers were the round winners: Henderson in 8.20 m and Wang in 8.24 m. In a low quality display only four athletes went beyond eight metres. Defending champion Rutherford narrowly reached the final in tenth place after two fouls and a moderate third jump. Tornéus of Sweden was eliminated, as was American Hartfield, both failing to go beyond 7.70 m.

From the first jumps the top four separated from the rest. Greg Rutherford jumped 8.18 m, Luvo Manyonga 8.16 m, Jeff Henderson 8.20 m, then Jarrion Lawson 8.19 m, all four within four centimetres at a distance no other jumper would match. In the third round Rutherford took the lead briefly with 8.22 m until Lawson bettered him with 8.25 m. In the fourth round, Manyonga took the lead with 8.28 m, then Rutherford moved into second with an 8.26 m. In the fifth round, Manyonga took first place with a personal best of 8.37 m and kept the lead into the final round with three jumpers to go. On his last attempt, Henderson jumped from fourth to first with a 8.38 m (27 ft 5 3/4 in). Rutherford tried to answer but his 8.29 m left him in third. On the final jump of the competition, American collegian Lawson jumped close to Henderson's mark, but his hand inadvertently dragged in the sand at shoulder level costing him an advancement into the medals.

The medals were presented by Adam Pengilly, IOC member, Great Britain and Anna Riccardi, Council Member of the IAAF.

== Background ==
This was the 28th appearance of the event, which is one of 12 athletics events to have been held at every Summer Olympics. The returning finalists from the 2012 Games were gold medalist Greg Rutherford of Great Britain, fourth-place finisher Michel Tornéus of Sweden, ninth-place finisher Henry Frayne of Australia, and twelfth-place finisher Tyrone Smith of Bermuda.

Rutherford entered as the 2012 Olympic champion and was also the reigning 2015 World Champion and 2016 European champion. American Jarrion Lawson was the top ranked athlete before the Olympics with his jump of 8.58 m and the next best entrant Michel Tornéus was European runner-up to Rutherford. Other strong entrants were Rushwal Samaai, Americans Mike Hartfield and Jeff Henderson (2015 Pan Am champion), and 2015 world medallists Fabrice Lapierre and Wang Jianan.

Albania made its first appearance in the event. The United States appeared for the 27th time, most of any nation, having missed only the boycotted 1980 Games.

== Qualification ==
A National Olympic Committee (NOC) could enter up to 3 qualified athletes in the men's long jump event if all athletes meet the entry standard during the qualifying period. (The limit of 3 has been in place since the 1930 Olympic Congress.) The qualifying standard was 8.15 metres. The qualifying period was from 1 May 2015 to 11 July 2016. The qualifying distance standards could be obtained in various meets during the given period that have the approval of the IAAF. Only outdoor meets were accepted. NOCs could also use their universality place—each NOC could enter one male athlete regardless of time if they had no male athletes meeting the entry standard for an athletics event—in the long jump.

== Competition format ==
The competition consisted of two rounds, qualification and final. In qualification, each athlete jumped three times (stopping early if they made the qualifying distance of 8.15 metres). At least the top twelve athletes moved on to the final; if more than twelve reached the qualifying distance, all who did so advanced. Distances were reset for the final round. Finalists jumped three times, after which the eight best jumped three more times (with the best distance of the six jumps counted).

== Records ==
Prior to the competition, the existing world and Olympic records, and season leading distance, were as follows.

World record	Mike Powell (USA)	8.95	Tokyo, Japan	30 August 1991
Olympic record	Bob Beamon (USA)	8.90	Mexico City, Mexico	18 October 1968

2016 World leading	Jarrion Lawson (USA)	8.58	Eugene, United States	3 July 2016

No new world or Olympic records were set during the competition.

== Schedule ==
All times are Brasilia Time (UTC-3)

Date	Time	Round
Friday, 12 August 2016	21:20	Qualifying
Saturday, 13 August 2016	20:53	Final

== Results ==
=== Qualifying ===
Qualification rule: qualification standard 8.15m (Q) or at least best 12 qualified (q).

Rank	Group	Athlete	Nation	1	2	3	Result	Notes
1	B	Wang Jianan	China	8.24	—	—	8.24	Q, SB
2	A	Jeff Henderson	United States	8.20	—	—	8.20	Q, SB
3	A	Emiliano Lasa	Uruguay	8.14	8.02	–	8.14	q
4	A	Luvo Manyonga	South Africa	X	8.12	8.10	8.12	q
5	A	Rushwal Samaai	South Africa	8.03	7.96	7.82	8.03	q
6	A	Henry Frayne	Australia	7.96	7.97	8.01	8.01	q
7	B	Jarrion Lawson	United States	7.99	7.62	7.96	7.99	q
8	B	Fabrice Lapierre	Australia	X	7.96	7.73	7.96	q
9	A	Huang Changzhou	China	7.59	7.57	7.95	7.95	q
10	A	Greg Rutherford	Great Britain	X	X	7.90	7.90	q
11	A	Kafétien Gomis	France	7.81	7.67	7.89	7.89	q
12	B	Damar Forbes	Jamaica	7.85	7.68	7.62	7.85	q
13	B	Radek Juška	Czech Republic	7.64	7.84	7.83	7.84	
14	A	Kim Deok-hyeon	South Korea	7.42	7.76	7.82	7.82	
15	B	Maykel Massó	Cuba	7.79	7.73	7.81	7.81	
16	A	Tyrone Smith	Bermuda	7.78	7.81	7.67	7.81	
17	B	Chan Ming Tai	Hong Kong	7.79	7.76	7.42	7.79	
18	A	Fabian Heinle	Germany	7.64	X	7.79	7.79	
19	B	Bachana Khorava	Georgia	7.72	7.77	X	7.77	
20	B	Jean Marie Okutu	Spain	7.75	7.72	7.53	7.75	
21	A	Izmir Smajlaj	Albania	7.72	7.61	X	7.72	
22	B	Stefan Brits	South Africa	7.46	7.71	X	7.71	
23	B	Kanstantsin Barycheuski	Belarus	7.39	X	7.67	7.67	
24	B	Ankit Sharma	India	X	X	7.67	7.67	
25	B	Mike Hartfield	United States	7.66	X	7.66	7.66	
26	A	Michel Tornéus	Sweden	X	7.65	7.63	7.65	
27	A	Miltiadis Tentoglou	Greece	X	7.64	7.57	7.64	
28	B	Higor Alves	Brazil	7.59	X	X	7.59	
29	B	Mohammad Arzandeh	Iran	7.29	7.23	7.31	7.31	
30	B	Alyn Camara	Germany	5.16	X	X	5.16	
—	A	Gao Xinglong	China	X	X	X	No mark	
—	A	Aubrey Smith	Jamaica	X	X	X	No mark	

=== Final ===
Rank	Athlete	Nation	1	2	3	4	5	6	Result	Notes
1st place, gold medalist(s)	Jeff Henderson	United States	8.20	7.94	8.10	7.96	8.22	8.38	8.38	SB
2nd place, silver medalist(s)	Luvo Manyonga	South Africa	8.16	X	X	8.28	8.37	X	8.37	PB
3rd place, bronze medalist(s)	Greg Rutherford	Great Britain	8.18	8.11	8.22	8.26	8.09	8.29	8.29	
4	Jarrion Lawson	United States	8.19	8.15	8.25	X	X	7.78	8.25	
5	Wang Jianan	China	7.76	8.17	7.89	8.05	8.13	7.88	8.17	
6	Emiliano Lasa	Uruguay	7.93	7.84	8.04	8.10	7.92	7.95	8.10	
7	Henry Frayne	Australia	7.83	8.06	X	8.03	7.83	7.83	8.06	
8	Kafétien Gomis	France	7.54	7.57	8.05	X	7.55	7.83	8.05	
9	Rushwahl Samaai	South Africa	7.97	7.94	X	Did not advance			7.97	
10	Fabrice Lapierre	Australia	X	7.87	X	Did not advance			7.87	
11	Huang Changzhou	China	7.78	X	7.86	Did not advance			7.86	
12	Damar Forbes	Jamaica	7.63	7.74	7.82	Did not advance			7.82	
