= List of Aruban records in athletics =

The following are the national records in athletics in Aruba maintained by its national athletics federation: Aruba Athletic Federation (AAF).

== Outdoor ==
Key to tables: Awaiting ratification Record not kept by AAB Not ratified or later rescinded by AAB

=== Men ===
Event	Record	Athlete	Date	Meet	Place	Ref.
100 m	10.42 (+1.7 m/s)	Geronimo Goeloe	5 May 2012	4to Circuito Fapur Mayagüez	Mayagüez, Puerto Rico	
100 m	10.37 (+0.9 m/s)	Miguel Janssen	26 June 1999		Apeldoorn, Netherlands	
200 m	20.59	Miguel Janssen	17 July 1994		Assen, Netherlands	
400 m	47.73	Anthony Rasmijn	26 May 2018		Oordegem, Belgium	
800 m	1:55.10 (Note: Outdoor best, indoor mark ratified as absolute record.)	Asher Patel	12 April 2026	Big Red Invite & Multi	Ithaca, United States	
1500 m	3:54.01	Asher Patel	4 April 2025	Transatlantic Series	Philadelphia, United States	
3000 m	8:24.8 h	Kimball Reynierse	6 July 1988		Middelburg, Netherlands	
5000 m	14:18.31	Kimball Reynierse	8 May 1986		Leiden, Netherlands	
10,000 m	29:12.53	Kimball Reynierse	14 May 1986		Leiden, Netherlands	
10 km (road)	29:08	Kimball Reynierse	3 June 1990		The Hague, Netherlands	
Half marathon	1:05:35	Kimball Reynierse	4 August 1991		Onderdijk, Netherlands	
Half marathon	1:03:06	Kimball Reynierse	May 1991		Utrecht, Netherlands	
Marathon	2:13:43	Kimball Reynierse	10 September 1989		Berchem, Belgium	
110 m hurdles	14.58	Freddy Burgos	6 July 1986		Vught, Netherlands	
400 m hurdles	53.49	Freddy Burgos	9 June 1984		Leiden, Netherlands	
3000 m steeplechase	9:35.9 h	Kimball Reynierse	16 August 1980		Remscheid, West Germany	
High jump	2.12 m	Wuill Vrolijk	9 May 2026	Ter Specke Bokaal	Lisse, Netherlands	
Pole vault	3.30 m	Ericko Pieternella	1995			
Long jump	7.72 m (+1.9 m/s)	Quincy Breell	16 May 2015	Grand Prix "Bolivar Ganador"	Cartagena, Colombia	
Triple jump	13.14 m	Freddy Burgos	12 June 1977		Breda, Netherlands	
Shot put	13.60 m	Shane Nedd	8 June 2007		Willemstad, Netherlands Antilles	
Discus throw	34.65 m	Ericko Pieternella	7 July 2018		Willemstad, Curaçao	
Discus throw	35.97 m	Ericko Pieternella	26 November 2022		Oranjestad, Aruba	
Hammer throw	25.30 m	Ericko Pieternella	4 September 2018		Málaga, Spain	
Javelin throw	61.29 m	Pierre de Windt	20 May 2017		Den Haag, Netherlands	
Decathlon	6021 pts h	Freddy Burgos	25-26 September 1988		Amstelveen, Netherlands	
Decathlon	100m / Long jump / Shot put / High jump / 400m / 110m H / Discus / Pole vault / Javelin / 1500m; 11.2 / 6.71 m / 10.17 m / 1.80 m / 52.1 / 15.1 / 32.16 m / 2.80 m / 39.88 m / 4:51.8					
20 km walk (road)	2:04:09	Harlen Manuel Villar Polo	31 August 2005		San Sebastián, Spain	
50 km walk (road)						
4 × 100 m relay	42.35	Aruba; Geronimo Goeloe; Jeffrey Gomez; Shakyll Lourens; Quincy Breell	16 July 2011	Central American and Caribbean Championships	Mayagüez, Puerto Rico	
4 × 400 m relay	3:49.29	Tristan Vermeulen; J. Vermeulen; Z. Geerman ?	30 June 2018		Oranjestad, Aruba	
4 × 400 m relay	3:49.00	Team AAC; Justice Dreischor; Kelvin Gonzalez; Tristan Vermeulen; Jason Oliver	29 June 2018		Oranjestad, Aruba	

=== Women ===
Event	Record	Athlete	Date	Meet	Place	Ref.
100 m	11.73	Evelyn Farrell	22 July 1983		Havana, Cuba	
200 m	25.20 (+0.1 m/s)	Jelissa Nedd	23 June 2011	Aruban Championships	Dacota, Aruba	
200 m	25.11	Ciska Janssen	8 March 1974		Santo Domingo, Dominican Republic	
400 m	57.78	Jelissa Nedd	9 July 2011	Trupial Auto City Invitational	Willemstad, Curaçao	
800 m	2:21.54	Vera-Elise Bakmeyer	7 May 2022	South American Youth Games	Rosario, Argentina	
1500 m	4:53.84	Emma Gobert	4 April 2026	CARIFTA Games	St. George’s, Grenada	
1500 m	4:48.87	Rebecca Jansen	18 April 2026	Morgan State Legacy Meet	Baltimore, United States	
3000 m	10:36.37	Emma Gobert	5 April 2026	CARIFTA Games	St. George’s, Grenada	
5000 m	18:39.6 h (Note: 18:36.6 on 6 June 1991 sourced by federation)	Cornelia Melis	6 July 1991		Middelburg, Netherlands	
5000 m	18:01.0 h Mx	Cornelia Melis	31 May 1989		Vlissingen, Netherlands	
5000 m	17:46.27	Rebecca Jansen	4 April 2026	Sam Howell Invitational	Princeton, United States	
10,000 m	38:23.0 h	Cornelia Melis	13 August 1987	Pan American Games	Indianapolis, United States	
10,000 m	37:29.41	Rebecca Jansen	14 May 2026	MEAC Championships	Norfolk, United States	
Marathon	2:53:24	Cornelia Melis	23 September 1988	Olympic Games	Seoul, South Korea	
100 m hurdles	15.76 NWI	Montserrat Willems	11 February 2026	AAF ARU Athletics Festival	Oranjestad, Aruba	
100 m hurdles	15.45	Ciska Janssen	7 March 1974		Santo Domingo, Dominican Republic	
400 m hurdles						
3000 m steeplechase						
High jump	1.66 m	Jessica Pina	7 April 1996	CARIFTA Games	Kingston, Jamaica	
Pole vault						
Long jump	5.86 m (−0.4 m/s)	Sylvienne Krozendijk	12 May 2007		Johnson City, United States	
Long jump	6.02 m	Ciska Janssen	8 March 1974		Santo Domingo, Dominican Republic	
Triple jump	11.99 m (+1.4 m/s)	Judeska Sheppard	21 May 2018	T-Meeting	Tilburg, Netherlands	
Shot put	11.68 m (Note: record set during heptathlon competition)	Julianne Dorothal	1 June 2013		Ottawa, Canada	
Shot put	12.23 m	Ciska Janssen	8 March 1974		Santo Domingo, Dominican Republic	
Discus throw	29.89 m	Aureen Lampe	21 June 2019		Oranjestad, Aruba	
Discus throw	41.04 m	Sherry Howell	8 March 1985		Barbados	
Hammer throw	48.09 m	Shawney Coenraad	6 May 2022	USD Twilight	Vermillion, United States	
Javelin throw	37.25 m	Julianne Dorothal	4 May 2019	Horizon Championships	Youngstown, United States	
Javelin throw	42.20 m	Sherry Howell	9 March 1985		Barbados	
Heptathlon	4352 pts	Julianne Dorothal	26–27 March 2016	CARIFTA Games	St. George's, Grenada	
Heptathlon	100m H / High jump / Shot put / 200m / Long jump / Javelin / 800m; 16.04 (-0.5) / 1.60 m / 10.03 m / 27.99 (-0.1) / 5.09 m (+0.1) / 32.81 m / 2:35.16					
5 km walk (road)	44:53	Irene Webb	13 March 2022		Oranjestad, Aruba	
10 km walk (road)	1:09:41	Rhona Steward	1 September 2007		Oranjestad, Aruba	
20 km walk (road)						
4 × 100 m relay	49.07	Lixandra Geerman; Toni Lisa Brown; Davenka Duncan; M. Kock	30 June 2018		Oranjestad, Aruba	
4 × 400 m relay	4:25.03	Aruba; Olympia Team Girls; Denise Brouwer; Shaniqua van Doorn; Dayna Leer; Monsterrat Willems	26 August 2022		Dacota, Aruba	

=== Men Junior ===
Event	Record	Athlete	Date	Meet	Place	Age	Ref.
100 m	10.79	Miguel Janssen	27 July 1989		San Juan, Puerto Rico	18 years, 325 days	
200 m	22.01	Miguel Janssen	25 June 1989		Krommenie, Netherlands	18 years, 293 days	
400 m	49.98	Miguel Janssen	11 September 1988		The Hague, Netherlands	18 years, 6 days	
800 m	1:55.27	Asher Patel	19 April 2025	CARIFTA Games	Port of Spain, Trinidad and Tobago	18 years, 343 days	
1500 m	3:54.01	Asher Patel	4 April 2025	Transatlantic Series	Philadelphia, United States	18 years, 328 days	
3000 m	9:13.47	Asher Patel	21 July 2023	NACAC U18 and U23 Championships	San José, Costa Rica	17 years, 71 days	
5000 m	15:43.30	Christiaan Jansen	23 January 2026	AAF Kickoff Classic	Oranjestad, Aruba		
10,000 m	33:21.90	Richard Rodriguez	9 July 1988		Caracas, Venezuela	18 years, 212 days	
110 m hurdles	14.6	Freddy Burgos	24 September 1978		Papendal, Netherlands		
3000 m steeplechase	9:35.9 h	Kimball Reynierse	16 August 1980		Remscheid, West Germany	19 years, 219 days	
High jump	2.07 m A	Wuill Vrolijk	15 July 2017		Nairobi, Kenya		
Pole vault	3.30 m	Ericko Pieternella	1995				
Long jump	7.08 m (+1.3 m/s)	Pierre de Windt	17 May 2002		Oranjestad, Aruba	18 years, 308 days	
Triple jump	13.14 m	Freddy Burgos	12 June 1977		Breda, Netherlands		
Shot put	13.60 m	Shane Nedd	8 June 2007		Willemstad, Netherlands Antilles		
Shot put (6 kg)	14.74 m	Shane Nedd	24 March 2008		Basseterre, St. Kitts and Nevis		
Discus throw	31.70 m	Shane Nedd	9 June 2007		Willemstad, Netherlands Antilles		
Javelin throw	46.94 m (Note: record set during octathlon competition)	Wuill Vrolijk	1 April 2018	CARIFTA Games	Nassau, Bahamas		
Decathlon	6014 pts h	Freddy Burgos	24 September 1978		Papendal, Netherlands		

=== Women Junior ===
Event	Record	Athlete	Date	Meet	Place	Age	Ref.
100 m	12.22	Luz Geerman	16 June 2000		Willemstad, Netherlands Antilles	16 years, 110 days	
200 m	25.20 (+0.1 m/s)	Jelissa Nedd	23 June 2011	National Championships	Dacota, Aruba		
400 m	57.78	Jelissa Nedd	9 July 2011	Trupial Auto City Invitational	Willemstad, Curaçao		
800 m	2:21.54	Vera-Elise Bakmeyer	7 May 2022	South American Youth Games	Rosario, Argentina		
1500 m	4:53.84	Emma Gobert	4 April 2026	CARIFTA Games	St. George’s, Grenada	14 years, 113 days	
3000 m	10:36.37	Emma Gobert	5 April 2026	CARIFTA Games	St. George’s, Grenada	14 years, 114 days	
100 m hurdles	15.76 NWI	Montserrat Willems	11 February 2026	AAF ARU Athletics Festival	Oranjestad, Aruba		
High jump	1.66 m	Jessica Pina	7 April 1996	CARIFTA Games	Kingston, Jamaica		
Pole vault							
Long jump	5.73 m	Toni-Lisa Brown	21 June 2014		Oranjestad, Aruba		
Triple jump	11.99 m (+1.4 m/s)	Judeska Sheppard	21 May 2018	T-Meeting	Tilburg, Netherlands		
Shot put	11.68 m	Julianne Dorothal	1 June 2013		Ottawa, Canada		
Discus throw	29.89 m	Aureen Lampe	21 June 2019		Oranjestad, Aruba		
Javelin throw	34.87 m (Note: record set during heptathlon competition)	Julianne Dorothal	5 April 2015	CARIFTA Games	Basseterre, Saint Kitts and Nevis		
Heptathlon	4352 pts	Julianne Dorothal	26–27 March 2016	CARIFTA Games	St. George's, Grenada		
Heptathlon	100m H / High jump / Shot put / 200m / Long jump / Javelin / 800m; 16.04 (-0.5) / 1.60 m / 10.03 m / 27.99 (-0.1) / 5.09 m (+0.1) / 32.81 m / 2:35.16						
10 km walk (road)	69:40:00	Rhona Stewart	9 July 2007		Oranjestad, Aruba		
4 × 100 m relay	49.96	Aruba; Y-Track Youth Girls; Lixandra Geerman; Davenka Duncan; Naomi Cecilia; Toni Lisa Brown	23 June 2014	Aruban Championships	Dacota, Aruba		

== Indoor ==
=== Men ===
Event	Record	Athlete	Date	Meet	Place	Ref.
60 m	6.63	Miguel Janssen	14 February 1998		The Hague, Netherlands	
200 m	21.14	Miguel Janssen	1 February 1998	Indoor Flanders Meeting	Ghent, Belgium	
400 m	49.20	Michael Rasmijn	2 March 2018	World Championships	Birmingham, United Kingdom	
800 m	1:54.31	Asher Patel	31 January 2026	Cornell Invitational	Ithaca, United States	
1000 m	2:25.48	Asher Patel	28 February 2026	Ivy League Heptagonal Championships	New York City, United States	
1500 m		/				
3000 m						
60 m hurdles	8.97	Johan Arends	28 February 2026	ODAC Championships	Salem, United States	
High jump	2.11 m	Wuill Vrolijk	1 March 2026	Dutch Championships	Apeldoorn, Netherlands	
Pole vault						
Long jump	7.25 m	Quincy Breell	20 March 2016	World Championships	Portland, United States	
Triple jump						
Shot put						
Heptathlon						
Heptathlon	60m / Long jump / Shot put / High jump / 60m H / Pole vault / 1000m					
5000 m walk						
4 × 400 m relay						

=== Women ===
Event	Record	Athlete	Date	Meet	Place	Ref.
60 m	7.99	Jelissa Nedd	31 January 2015		Zoetermeer, Netherlands	
200 m	27.25	Silvienne Krosendijk	3 December 2005		Middletown, United States	
400 m	57.24	Eljoenai Wehl	28 February 2026	G-MAC Championships	Ashland, United States	
800 m						
1500 m						
3000 m	10:18.01	Rebecca Jansen	22 February 2026	MEAC Championships	Virginia Beach, United States	
5000 m	17:34.96	Rebecca Jansen	23 February 2026	MEAC Championships	Virginia Beach, United States	
60 m hurdles						
High jump						
Pole vault						
Long jump	5.89 m (Note: outdoor mark ratified as absolute record)	Silvienne Krosendijk	29 February 2008		Johnson City, United States	
Triple jump	11.69 m (Note: outdoor mark ratified as absolute record)	Judeska Sheppard	19 February 2017	Dutch Junior Championships	Apeldoorn, Netherlands	
Triple jump	11.82 m (Note: outdoor mark ratified as absolute record)	Judeska Sheppard	16 February 2019	Dutch Championships	Apeldoorn, Netherlands	
Shot put						
Pentathlon						
Pentathlon	60m H / High jump / Shot put / Long jump / 800m					
3000 m walk						
4 × 400 m relay						

=== Women Junior ===
Event	Record	Athlete	Date	Meet	Place	Ref.
60 m	7.99	Jelissa Nedd	31 January 2015		Zoetermeer, Netherlands	
200 m	27.25	Silvienne Krosendijk	3 December 2005		Middletown, United States	
Long jump	5.89 m	Silvienne Krosendijk	29 February 2008		Johnson City, United States	
Triple jump	11.69 m	Judeska Sheppard	19 February 2017	Dutch Junior Championships	Apeldoorn, Netherlands	
