= Aruba at the 2023 World Athletics Championships =

- Flag of Aruba
- WA code: ARU

in Budapest, Hungary 19 August 2023 – 27 August 2023
- Competitors: 1 (1 man and 0 women)
- Medals: Gold 0 Silver 0 Bronze 0 Total 0

World Athletics Championships appearances (overview)
- 1987; 1991; 1993; 1995; 1997; 1999; 2001–2009; 2011; 2013; 2015; 2017; 2019; 2022; 2023; 2025

Aruba competed at the 2023 World Athletics Championships in Budapest, Hungary, which were held from 19 to 27 August 2023. The athlete delegation of the country was composed of one competitor, middle-distance runner Justice Dreischor who would compete in the men's 800 metres. He qualified upon being selected by the Aruba Athletic Federation. Dreischor placed ninth in his heat and did not advance to the finals.

== Background ==
The 2023 World Athletics Championships in Budapest, Hungary, were held from 19 to 27 August 2023. The Championships were held at the National Athletics Centre. To qualify for the World Championships, athletes had to reach an entry standard (e.g. time or distance), place in a specific position at select competitions, be a wild card entry, or qualify through their World Athletics Ranking at the end of the qualification period.

As Aruba did not meet any of the four standards, they could send either one male or one female athlete in one event of the Championships who has not yet qualified. The Aruba Athletic Federation selected middle-distance runner and software engineer Justice Dreischor, who broke a seven year old national record, before the World Championships in the men's 800 metres with a time of 1:56.42 at a competition in Utrecht.

== Results ==
=== Men ===
Dreischor competed in the heats of the men's 800 metres on 22 August against eight other athletes. While he raced, his athletic wear bore bright colors and patterned triangles, with Theo Kahler of Runner's World calling it "fun". He placed ninth in his heat with a time of 1:59.56 and did not advance to the semi-finals.

Key

- Q = Qualified for the next round
- q = Qualified for the next round as a fastest loser or, in field events, by position without achieving the qualifying target
- NR = National record
- PB = Personal best
- SB = Season best
- N/A = Round not applicable for the event

=== Men ===
Track and road events
Athlete	Event	Heat		Semifinal		Final	
Athlete	Event	Result	Rank	Result	Rank	Result	Rank
Justice Dreischor	800 metres	1:59.56	9	Did not advance			
