= 2014 USA Outdoor Track and Field Championships =

- Dates: June 26–29
- Host city: Sacramento, California, United States
- Venue: Sacramento State University Hornet Stadium
- Level: Senior
- Type: Outdoor
- Events: 40 (men: 20; women: 20)

The 2014 USA Outdoor Track and Field Championships was held at Hornet Stadium in Sacramento, California. Organised by USA Track and Field, the four-day competition took place June 26–29 in conjunction with the USA Junior Combined Events Outdoor Track & Field Championships which started the day before and served as the national championships in track and field for the United States.

== Schedule ==
The men's and women's shot put events were contested at the California State Capitol, separate from the rest of the program held at Hornet Stadium.

Event schedule
Day	Events
June 25	Shot put qualifying and finals (men and women)
June 26	Decathlon (day 1), hammer throw (men), 800 m heats (men and women), triple jump final (women), 400 m heats (men and women), 1500 m heats (men), javelin final (women), 100 m heats (men and women), steeplechase heats (women), 10,000 meters final (men and women)
June 27	Decathlon (day 2), heptathlon (day 1), discus throw final (men), 400 m hurdles heats (men and women), 100 m hurdles heats (women), pole vault final (women), 100 m semi-finals and finals (men and women), triple jump final (men), steeplechase heats (men), 1500 m heats (women), 400 m semi-finals (men and women), 800 m semi-finals (men and women), 5000 m final (men and women)
June 28	20 km walk final (women), heptathlon (day 2), hammer throw final (women), 100 m hurdles semi-finals and finals (women), 200 m heats (men and women), high jump final (men), 110 m hurdles heats (men), long jump final (women), 400 m hurdles semi-finals (men and women), steeplechase final (women), 1500 m final (men), 400 m final (men and women)
June 29	20 km walk final (men), pole vault final (men), 200 m semi-finals and finals (men and women), discus throw final (women), javelin final (men), high jump final (women), long jump final (men), 110 m hurdles semi-finals and final (men), 400 m hurdles final (men and women), 800 m final (men and women), steeplechase final (men), 1500 m final (women)

== Men's results ==
=== Men track events ===
Event	Gold		Silver		Bronze	
100 meters (-1.7 m/s)	Mike Rodgers	10.09	Ryan Bailey	10.23	Sean McLean	10.26
200 meters (+1.3 m/s)	Curtis Mitchell	20.13	Wallace Spearmon	20.19	Maurice Mitchell	20.30
400 meters	Gil Roberts	44.53	Josh Mance	44.89	Kyle Clemons	45.00
800 meters	Duane Solomon	1:44.30	Casimir Loxsom	1:45.97	Erik Sowinski	1:46.94
1500 meters	Leo Manzano	3:38.63	Pat Casey	3:38.94	Lopez Lomong	3:39.11
5000 meters	Bernard Lagat	13:31.41	Andrew Bumbalough	13:32.01	Hassan Mead	13:32.42
10,000 meters	Galen Rupp	28:12.07	Chris Derrick	28:18.18	Ryan Vail	28:26.02
110 meters hurdles (+2.1 m/s)	Devon Allen	13.155	Ryan Wilson	13.160	David Oliver	13.23
400 meters hurdles	Johnny Dutch	48.93	Michael Stigler	49.63	Reggie Wyatt	50.16
3000 meters st.	Evan Jager	8:18.83	Dan Huling	8:19.73	Donn Cabral	8:20.04
20 kilometers walk	John Nunn	1:27:56.39	Patrick Stroupe	1:29:26.68	Nick Christie	1:29:52.67

=== Men field events ===
Event	Gold		Silver		Bronze	
High jump^{[c]}	Erik Kynard	2.35 m (7 ft 8 1/2 in)	Nick Ross Dustin Jonas	2.28 m (7 ft 5 3/4 in)		
Pole vault	Sam Kendricks	5.75 m (18 ft 10 1/4 in)	Mark Hollis	5.70 m (18 ft 8 1/4 in)	Victor Weirich	5.60 m (18 ft 4 1/4 in)
Long jump	Jeffery Henderson	8.52 m (27 ft 11 1/4 in) (+3.5 m/s)	Jarrion Lawson	8.13 m (26 ft 8 in) (+2.6 m/s)	Michael Hartfield	8.03 m (26 ft 4 in) (+3.6 m/s)
Triple jump	Will Claye	17.75 m (58 ft 2 3/4 in) (+0.8 m/s)	Christian Taylor	17.37 m (56 ft 11 3/4 in) (+1.1 m/s)	Chris Benard	17.10 m (56 ft 1 in) (+0.0 m/s)
Shot put	Joseph Kovacs	22.03 m (72 ft 3 1/4 in)	Kurtis Roberts	21.47 m (70 ft 5 1/4 in)	Reese Hoffa	20.78 m (68 ft 2 in)
Discus throw	Hayden Reed	62.19 m (204 ft 1/4 in)	Bryan Powlen	61.05 m (200 ft 3 1/2 in)	Mason Finley	61.04 m (200 ft 3 in)
Hammer throw	Kibwe Johnson	74.16 m (243 ft 3 1/2 in)	AG Kruger	73.34 m (240 ft 7 1/4 in)	Chris Cralle	72.83 m (238 ft 11 1/4 in)
Javelin throw	Sean Furey	81.10 m (266 ft 3/4 in)	Riley Dolezal	79.27 m (260 ft 3/4 in)	Timothy Glover	78.87 m (258 ft 9 in)
Decathlon	Trey Hardee	8599 pts	Wesley Bray	7807 pts	Thomas FitzSimons	7645 pts

==== Notes ====
- ^{c} Nick Ross and Dustin Jonas tied on misses at 2.25m & 2.28m.

== Women's results ==
=== Women track events ===
Event	Gold		Silver		Bronze	
100 meters (-2.1 m/s)	Tianna Bartoletta	11.15	Barbara Pierre	11.27	LaKeisha Lawson	11.30
200 meters (+3.2 m/s)	Jeneba Tarmoh	22.06	Kimberlyn Duncan	22.10	Joanna Atkins	22.19
400 meters	Francena McCorory	49.48	Sanya Richards-Ross	49.66	Natasha Hastings	50.53
800 meters	Ajee' Wilson	1:58.70	Laura Roesler	1:59.04	Molly Beckwith	1:59.35
1500 meters	Jenny Simpson	4:04.96	Mary Cain	4:06.34	Katie Mackey	4:07.70
5000 meters	Molly Huddle	15:01.56	Shannon Rowbury	15:01.71	Marielle Hall	15:12.79
10,000 meters	Kim Conley	32:02.07	Jordan Hasay	32:03.28	Amy Hastings	32:18.81
100 meters hurdles (-1.6 m/s)	Dawn Harper-Nelson	12.55	Queen Harrison	12.56	Lolo Jones	12.65
400 meters hurdles	Kori Carter	53.84	Georganne Moline	54.00	Cassandra Tate	54.70
3000 meters st.	Emma Coburn	9:19.72	Ashley Higginson	9:27.59	Stephanie Garcia	9:32.76
20 kilometers walk	Maria Michta	1:35:54.37	Miranda Melville	1:37:59.83	Erin Gray	1:39:23.91

=== Women field events ===
Event	Gold		Silver		Bronze	
High jump^{[r]}	Inika McPherson	DQ ~~2.00 m (6 ft 6 1/2 in)~~	Chaunte Lowe	1.94 m (6 ft 4 1/4 in)	Brigetta Barrett	1.91 m (6 ft 3 in)
Pole vault^{[q]}	Jenn Suhr	4.60 m (15 ft 1 in)	Sandi Morris	4.55 m (14 ft 11 in)	Becky Holliday	4.45 m (14 ft 7 in)
Long jump	Brittney Reese	6.92 m (22 ft 8 1/4 in) (+1.9 m/s)	Tianna Bartoletta	6.86 m (22 ft 6 in) (-1.2 m/s)	Funmi Jimoh	6.81 m (22 ft 4 in) (-0.2 m/s)
Triple jump^{[p]}	Amanda Smock	13.77 m (45 ft 2 in) (+2.2 m/s)	Ciarra Brewer	13.57 m (44 ft 6 1/4 in) (+1.6 m/s)	Lynnika Pitts	13.57 m (44 ft 6 1/4 in) (+3.0 m/s)
Shot put	Michelle Carter	19.45 m (63 ft 9 1/2 in)	Felisha Johnson	19.18 m (62 ft 11 in)	Tia Brooks	18.83 m (61 ft 9 1/4 in)
Discus throw	Gia Lewis-Smallwood	65.96 m (216 ft 4 3/4 in)	Liz Podominick	59.96 m (196 ft 8 1/2 in)	Shelbi Vaughan	59.75 m (196 ft 1/4 in)
Hammer throw	Amanda Bingson	75.07 m (246 ft 3 1/2 in)	Jessica Cosby Toruga	71.72 m (235 ft 3 1/2 in)	Amber Campbell	71.35 m (234 ft 1 in)
Javelin throw	Kara Patterson	62.43 m (204 ft 9 3/4 in)	Brittany Borman	62.05 m (203 ft 6 3/4 in)	Leigh Petranoff	57.80 m (189 ft 7 1/2 in)
Heptathlon	Sharon Day-Monroe	6470 pts	Barbara Nwaba	6307 pts	Erica Bougard	6118 pts

==== Notes ====
- ^{r} Inika McPherson was later disqualified after testing positive for cocaine use.
- ^{q} Becky Holliday earned 3rd over Kaitlin Petrillose one fewer miss at 4.45 meters.
- ^{p} Ciarra Brewer earned 2nd place on the tiebreak rule of the 2nd furthest jump over Lynnika Pitts.
