= Aruba at the 2011 World Championships in Athletics =

- WA code: ARU
- National federation: Arubaanse Atletiek Bond
- Website: www.arubaathleticfederation.org

in Daegu
- Competitors: 2
- Medals: Gold 0 Silver 0 Bronze 0 Total 0

World Championships in Athletics appearances
- 1987; 1991; 1993; 1995; 1997; 1999; 2001–2009; 2011; 2013; 2015; 2017; 2019; 2022; 2023; 2025

Aruba competed at the 2011 World Championships in Athletics from August 27 to September 4 in Daegu, South Korea. A team of 2 athletes was announced to represent the country in the event.

== Results ==
=== Men ===
Athlete	Event	Preliminaries		Heats		Semifinals		Final	
Athlete	Event	Time Width Height	Rank	Time Width Height	Rank	Time Width Height	Rank	Time Width Height	Rank
Geronimo Goeloe	100 metres	10.73 (SB)	6 (Q)	10.84	47	Did not advance			

=== Women ===
Athlete	Event	Preliminaries		Heats		Semifinals		Final	
Athlete	Event	Time Width Height	Rank	Time Width Height	Rank	Time Width Height	Rank	Time Width Height	Rank
Shariska Winterdal	Marathon							3:49:48 (SB)	46
