= Aruba at the 2019 World Athletics Championships =

- WA code: ARU

in Doha, Qatar 27 September 2019 – 6 October 2019
- Competitors: 1 (1 man)
- Medals: Gold 0 Silver 0 Bronze 0 Total 0

World Athletics Championships appearances (overview)
- 1987; 1991; 1993; 1995; 1997; 1999; 2001–2009; 2011; 2013; 2015; 2017; 2019; 2022; 2023; 2025

Aruba competed at the 2019 World Athletics Championships in Doha, Qatar, which were held from 27 September to 6 October 2019. The athlete delegation of the nation consisted of one competitor, long-distance runner Jonathan Busby. He competed in the men's 5000 metres but was disqualified after receiving help from fellow runner Braima Suncar Dabó due to him being injured. Although being disqualified, Busby befriended Dabó and attended the World Athletics Awards to accept the International Fair Play Award due to the moment.

== Background ==
The 2019 World Athletics Championships in Doha, Qatar, were held from 27 September to 6 October 2019. The Championships were held at the Khalifa International Stadium. To qualify for the World Championships, athletes had to reach an entry standard (e.g. time or distance), place in a specific position at select competitions, be a wild card entry, or qualify through their World Athletics Ranking at the end of the qualification period.

As Aruba did not meet any of the four standards, they could send either one male or one female athlete in one event of the Championships who has not yet qualified. The Aruba Athletic Federation selected long-distance runner Jonathan Busby.

== Result ==
=== Men ===
Busby competed in the qualifying heats of the men's 5000 metres on 27 September in the first heat against 35 other athletes. During the race, he suffered from dehydration and an injury. He limped across the track before fellow runner Braima Suncar Dabó of Guinea-Bissau assisted him for the remainder of the race. Busby was ultimately disqualified in the race and failed to advance due to being assisted by another athlete. After the Championships, he had poor results in tournaments, was cyberbullied, and was diagnosed with bipolar depression amongst other things.

Though, Dabó and Busby were flown to Monaco in November of the same year, for Dabó to accept the International Fair Play Award at the World Athletics Awards. Although not sharing a same language, the two befriended each other and uses a translator to talk to each other online.

| Athlete | Event | Heat | | Semifinal | | Final | |
| Athlete | Event | Result | Rank | Result | Rank | Result | Rank |
|---|---|---|---|---|---|---|---|
| Jonathan Busby | 5000 metres | Disqualified | | —N/a | | did not advance | |
