= 2017 World Championships in Athletics – Men's long jump =

Men's long jump at the 2017 World Championships
- Venue: Olympic Stadium
- Dates: 4 August (qualification); 5 August (final)
- Competitors: 32 from 23 nations
- Winning distance: 8.48 m (27 ft 9 3/4 in)

Medalists
gold medal	Luvo Manyonga	South Africa
silver medal	Jarrion Lawson	United States
bronze medal	Rushwahl Samaai	South Africa

Video on YouTube Official Video

The men's long jump at the 2017 World Championships in Athletics was held at the Olympic Stadium on 4–5 August.

== Summary ==
In the final Jarrion Lawson took the lead with 8.37 metres on the fourth jump of the competition. Rushwahl Samaai jumped 8.25 metres on the next jump and the closest to Lawson was 2013 champion Aleksandr Menkov with 8.27 metres. But Menkov would not get in another legal jump. On the second jump of the second round Luvo Manyonga jumped 8.48 metres. Lawson jumped 8.43 metres two jumps later, 8.40 metres in the third round and 8.44 metres in the final round but couldn't reach Manyonga. Samaai jumped 8.27 metres in the fifth round to get the tiebreak edge on the bronze and solidified it with an 8.32 metres in the final round.

== Records ==
Before the competition records were as follows:

Record	Perf.	Athlete	Nat.	Date	Location
World	8.95	Mike Powell	USA	30 Aug 1991	Tokyo, Japan
Championship	8.95	Mike Powell	USA	30 Aug 1991	Tokyo, Japan
World leading	8.65	Luvo Manyonga	RSA	22 Apr 2017	Potchefstroom, South Africa
African	8.65	Luvo Manyonga	RSA	22 Apr 2017	Potchefstroom, South Africa
Asian	8.48	Mohamed Salman Al Khuwalidi	KSA	2 Jul 2006	Sotteville, France
NACAC	8.95	Mike Powell	USA	30 Aug 1991	Tokyo, Japan
South American	8.73	Irving Saladino	PAN	24 May 2008	Hengelo, Netherlands
European	8.86	Robert Emmiyan	URS	22 May 1987	Tsaghkadzor, Soviet Union
Oceanian	8.54	Mitchell Watt	AUS	9 Jul 2011	Stockholm, Sweden

No records were set at the competition.

== Qualification standard ==
The standard to qualify automatically for entry was 8.15 metres.

== Schedule ==
The event schedule, in local time (UTC+1), was as follows:

Date	Time	Round
4 August	19:30	Qualification
5 August	20:05	Final

== Results ==
=== Qualification ===
The qualification round took place on 4 August, in two groups, both starting at 19:30. Athletes attaining a mark of at least 8.05 metres ( Q ) or at least the 12 best performers ( q ) qualified for the final. The overall results were as follows:

Rank	Group	Name	Nationality	Round			Mark	Notes
Rank	Group	Name	Nationality	1	2	3	Mark	Notes
1	A	Radek Juška	Czech Republic	8.01	8.24		8.24	Q
2	A	Maykel Massó	Cuba	8.15			8.15	Q
3	B	Rushwahl Samaai	South Africa	7.95	8.04	8.14	8.14	Q
4	A	Luvo Manyonga	South Africa	8.12			8.12	Q
5	B	Aleksandr Menkov	Authorised Neutral Athletes	8.07			8.07	Q
5	A	Michel Tornéus	Sweden	8.07			8.07	Q
7	A	Shi Yuhao	China	x	x	8.06	8.06	Q
8	A	Jarrion Lawson	United States	8.02	x	8.05	8.05	Q
9	A	Emiliano Lasa	Uruguay	7.96	7.79	x	7.96	q
10	A	Damar Forbes	Jamaica	7.82	7.86	7.93	7.93	q
11	B	Wang Jianan	China	7.83	7.89	7.92	7.92	q
12	A	Fabrice Lapierre	Australia	7.67	7.91	7.84	7.91	q
13	B	Tyrone Smith	Bermuda	7.74	7.88	7.84	7.88	
14	B	Henry Frayne	Australia	7.68	7.88	6.61	7.88	
15	B	Juan Miguel Echevarría	Cuba	7.86	7.72	7.02	7.86	
16	A	Kim Deok-hyeon	South Korea	7.73	7.85	7.77	7.85	
17	B	Jeff Henderson	United States	7.74	x	7.84	7.84	
18	B	Kevin Ojiaku	Italy	7.82	7.64	7.38	7.82	
19	B	Miltiadis Tentoglou	Greece	7.70	7.79	x	7.79	
20	A	Marquis Dendy	United States	7.71	7.78	7.55	7.78	
21	B	Ramone Bailey	Jamaica	7.76	7.51	7.49	7.76	
22	A	Julian Howard	Germany	7.72	x	x	7.72	
23	B	Lazar Anić	Serbia	x	7.34	7.71	7.71	
24	A	Huang Changzhou	China	7.60	7.51	7.70	7.70	
25	A	Zarck Visser	South Africa	7.37	7.60	7.66	7.66	
26	B	Tomasz Jaszczuk	Poland	7.58	7.64	x	7.64	
27	B	Paulo Sérgio Oliveira	Brazil	7.53	x	x	7.53	
28	A	Yahya Berrabah	Morocco	7.49	7.33	7.33	7.49	
29	A	Arttu Pajulahti	Finland	7.49	x	x	7.49	
30	B	Serhiy Nykyforov	Ukraine	x	x	7.47	7.47	
31	B	Quincy Breell	Aruba	6.90	x	x	6.90	
	B	Eusebio Cáceres	Spain	x	x	x	NM	

=== Final ===
The final took place on 5 August at 20:05. The results were as follows:

Rank	Name	Nationality	Round						Mark	Notes
Rank	Name	Nationality	1	2	3	4	5	6	Mark	Notes
1st place, gold medalist(s)	Luvo Manyonga	South Africa	x	8.48	8.32	8.29	8.17	x	8.48	
2nd place, silver medalist(s)	Jarrion Lawson	United States	8.37	8.43	8.40	8.11	8.31	8.44	8.44	SB
3rd place, bronze medalist(s)	Rushwahl Samaai	South Africa	8.25	x	8.15	x	8.27	8.32	8.32	
4	Aleksandr Menkov	Authorised Neutral Athletes	8.27	x	x	x	x	x	8.27	
5	Maykel Massó	Cuba	x	8.11	8.22	x	8.26	7.98	8.26	
6	Shi Yuhao	China	7.93	8.17	x	7.74	x	8.23	8.23	
7	Wang Jianan	China	8.14	8.23	7.95	8.00	7.85	7.89	8.23	
8	Michel Tornéus	Sweden	8.18	x	x	x	7.92	8.05	8.18	
9	Emiliano Lasa	Uruguay	8.06	x	8.11				8.11	
10	Radek Juška	Czech Republic	7.81	8.02	5.34				8.02	
11	Fabrice Lapierre	Australia	7.89	7.93	7.91				7.93	
12	Damar Forbes	Jamaica	7.61	7.91	7.85				7.91	
