= Aruba at the 2015 World Championships in Athletics =

- WA code: ARU

in Beijing
- Competitors: 1
- Medals: Gold 0 Silver 0 Bronze 0 Total 0

World Championships in Athletics appearances
- 1987; 1991; 1993; 1995; 1997; 1999; 2001–2009; 2011; 2013; 2015; 2017; 2019; 2022; 2023

Aruba competed at the 2015 World Championships in Athletics in Beijing, China, from 22 to 30 August 2015. One athlete represented Aruba at the event.

== Results ==
(q – qualified, NM – no mark, SB – season best)

=== Men ===
| Athlete | Event | Preliminaries | | Final | |
| Athlete | Event | Mark | Rank | Mark | Rank |
|---|---|---|---|---|---|
| Quincy Breell | Long jump | NM | | did not advance | |
