= 2016 IAAF World Indoor Championships – Men's long jump =

Men's long jump at the 2016 IAAF World Indoor Championships
- Venue: Oregon Convention Center
- Dates: March 20
- Competitors: 14 from 12 nations
- Winning distance: 8.26

Medalists
gold medal	Marquis Dendy	United States
silver medal	Fabrice Lapierre	Australia
bronze medal	Huang Changzhou	China

The men's long jump at the 2016 IAAF World Indoor Championships took place on March 20, 2016.

The first round leader was Rushwal Samaai with an 8.14. He improved that on his second jump to a National Record equalling 8.18. Still in the same round, Americans Marquis Dendy and Jeff Henderson improved to the top two places, Dendy with a 8.26 m (27 ft 1 in) and Henderson edging into second with an 8.19. Neither improved after that. In the third round, Fabrice Lapierre jumped a continental record 8.25 to break up the duo, his 8.25 just 1 cm behind Dendy. Huang Changzhou also equalled Henderson with a personal best 8.19, but Henderson held the tiebreaker. Over the next two round, Henderson improved his tiebreaker advantage but could not improve his best. On his final jump, Huang improved his personal best again to 8.21 to take the bronze medal. The top 5 competitors were only separated by 8 cm. So close was the competition, minus their best jumps, Dendy would have finished in 5th position and Lapierre 11th, not even making the final.

== Results ==
The final was started at 13:05.

Rank	Athlete	Nationality	#1	#2	#3	#4	#5	#6	Result	Notes
1st place, gold medalist(s)	Marquis Dendy	United States	8.05	8.26	x	8.06	x	x	8.26	
2nd place, silver medalist(s)	Fabrice Lapierre	Australia	7.29	7.78	8.25	x	7.79	x	8.25	AR
3rd place, bronze medalist(s)	Huang Changzhou	China	7.76	7.82	8.19	7.91	7.95	8.21	8.21	PB
4	Jeff Henderson	United States	7.99	8.19	7.98	8.14	8.17	8.00	8.19	SB
5	Rushwal Samaai	South Africa	8.14	8.18	8.03	x	x		8.18	NR
6	Daniel Bramble	Great Britain	x	7.84	8.12	7.93	8.14		8.14	SB
7	Emiliano Lasa	Uruguay	7.94	x	7.70	x	7.86		7.94	NR
8	Wang Jianan	China	7.82	7.85	7.88	7.88	7.93		7.93	
9	Kafétien Gomis	France	7.73	7.73	7.88				7.88	
10	Radek Juška	Czech Republic	7.88	x	x				7.88	
11	Ifeanyi Otuonye	Turks and Caicos Islands	x	7.38	7.40				7.40	
12	Yohei Sugai	Japan	7.25	6.95	7.35				7.35	SB
13	Quincy Breell	Aruba	7.21	7.25	7.20				7.25	NR
	Ted Hooper	Chinese Taipei	x	x	x				NM	
