= Aruba at the 2013 World Championships in Athletics =

- WA code: ARU

in Moscow
- Competitors: 1
- Medals: Gold 0 Silver 0 Bronze 0 Total 0

World Championships in Athletics appearances
- 1987; 1991; 1993; 1995; 1997; 1999; 2001–2009; 2011; 2013; 2015; 2017; 2019; 2022; 2023; 2025

Aruba competed at the 2013 World Championships in Athletics from August 10 to August 18 in Moscow, Russia. A team of 1 athlete was announced to represent the country in the event.

== Results ==
(q – qualified, NM – no mark, SB – season best)

=== Men ===
Athlete	Event	Preliminaries		Final	
Athlete	Event	Mark	Rank	Mark	Rank
Quincy Breell	Long jump	7.10	28	did not advance	
