= Aruba at the 2022 World Athletics Championships =

- Flag of Aruba
- WA code: ARU
- National federation: Aruba Athletic Federation

in Eugene, United States 15 – 24 July 2022
- Competitors: 1 (1 man)
- Medals: Gold 0 Silver 0 Bronze 0 Total 0

World Athletics Championships appearances (overview)
- 1987; 1991; 1993; 1995; 1997; 1999; 2001–2009; 2011; 2013; 2015; 2017; 2019; 2022; 2023; 2025

Aruba competed at the 2022 World Athletics Championships in Eugene, Oregon, United States, which were held from 15 to 24 July 2022. The athlete delegation of the country was composed of one competitor, long-distance runner Jethro Saint-Fleur. He competed in the qualifying heats of the men's 5000 metres and placed last in his heat, failing to advance to the finals. His time was also the slowest amongst all of the athletes that competed.

== Background ==
The 2022 World Athletics Championships in Eugene, Oregon, United States, were held from 15 to 24 July 2022. To qualify for the World Championships, athletes had to reach an entry standard (e.g. time and distance), place in a specific position at select competitions, be a wild card entry, or qualify through their World Athletics Ranking at the end of the qualification period.

As Aruba did not meet any of the four standards, they could send either one male or one female athlete in one event of the Championships who has not yet qualified. The Aruba Athletic Federation selected long-distance runner Jethro Saint-Fleur. Saint-Fleur would make his debut for the team at the World Championships, with this competition being his first World Athletics-sanctioned competition.

== Results ==
Saint-Fleur competed in the qualifying heats of the men's 5000 metres on 21 July 2022 in the second heat against 19 other competitors. There, he recorded a time of 16:04.46 and placed last in his heat, failing to advance further as only the top 5 of each heat and the next five fastest athletes would only be able to do so. His time was the slowest amongst all of the athletes that competed in the heats.

Track and road events

Athlete	Event	Heat		Final	
Athlete	Event	Result	Rank	Result	Rank
Jethro Saint-Fleur	Men's 5000 metres	16:04.46	41	Did not advance	
