= 2010 IAAF World Indoor Championships – Men's long jump =

The men's long jump at the 2010 IAAF World Indoor Championships was held at the ASPIRE Dome on 12 and 13 March.

== Medalists ==
Gold	Silver	Bronze
Fabrice Lapierre; Australia	Godfrey Khotso Mokoena; South Africa	Mitchell Watt; Australia

== Records ==
Standing records prior to the 2010 IAAF World Indoor Championships
World record	Carl Lewis (USA)	8.79	New York City, United States	27 January 1984
Championship record	Iván Pedroso (CUB)	8.62	Maebashi, Japan	7 March 1999
World Leading	Salim Sdiri (FRA)	8.24	Paris, France	27 February 2010
African record	Ignisious Gaisah (GHA)	8.36	Stockholm, Sweden	2 February 2006
Asian record	Mohamed Salman Al-Khuwalidi (KSA)	8.24	Doha, Qatar	16 February 2008
European record	Sebastian Bayer (GER)	8.71	Turin, Italy	8 March 2009
North and Central American and Caribbean record	Carl Lewis (USA)	8.79	New York City, United States	27 January 1984
Oceanian Record	Glenn Carroll (AUS)	8.11	Flagstaff, United States	2 March 1990
Oceanian Record	Peter Burge (AUS)	8.11	Sindelfingen, Germany	4 March 2001
Oceanian Record	Peter Burge (AUS)	8.11	Lisbon, Portugal	11 March 2001
South American record	Irving Saladino (PAN)	8.42	Paiania, Greece	13 February 2008

== Qualification standards ==
Indoor
8.10 m

== Schedule ==
Date	Time	Round
March 12, 2010	16:45	Qualification, Group A
March 12, 2010	18:10	Qualification, Group B
March 13, 2010	17:45	Final

== Results ==
=== Qualification ===
Qualification: Qualifying Performance 8.00 (Q) or at least 8 best performers (q) advance to the final.

Rank	Group	Athlete	Nationality	#1	#2	#3	Result	Notes
1	B	Fabrice Lapierre	Australia	7.66	8.19		8.19	Q, AR
2	A	Mitchell Watt	Australia	8.00			8.00	Q
3	B	Christian Reif	Germany	7.70	7.12	7.96	7.96	q
4	B	Godfrey Khotso Mokoena	South Africa	7.72	7.74	7.95	7.95	q, SB
5	A	Salim Sdiri	France	7.81	7.94	x	7.94	q
6	A	Ndiss Kaba Badji	Senegal	7.93	x	x	7.93	q
7	B	Ignisious Gaisah	Ghana	7.89	x	x	7.89	q, SB
8	B	Andriy Makarchev	Ukraine	7.81	7.88	x	7.88	q
9	A	Issam Nima	Algeria	7.48	7.88	7.63	7.88	NR
10	B	Kafétien Gomis	France	7.60	7.74	7.84	7.84	
11	A	Greg Rutherford	Great Britain	7.35	7.80	x	7.80	
12	A	Irving Saladino	Panama	x	x	7.80	7.80	SB
13	A	Tommi Evilä	Finland	7.77	7.77	7.69	7.77	
14	B	Chris Tomlinson	Great Britain	7.62	x	7.75	7.75	
15	B	Gable Garenamotse	Botswana	x	7.73	7.62	7.73	SB
16	B	Michel Tornéus	Sweden	7.27	7.69	7.71	7.71	
17	B	Randall Flimmons	United States	7.68	7.49	7.68	7.68	
18	B	Li Jinzhe	China	7.41	7.58	7.68	7.68	
19	A	Viktor Kuznyetsov	Ukraine	7.64	7.66	7.28	7.66	
20	A	Jeff Henderson	United States	7.64	5.42	7.44	7.64	
21	B	Hussein Al-Sabee	Saudi Arabia	7.42	7.56	7.46	7.56	
22	A	Yu Zhenwei	China	7.54	x	7.46	7.54	
23	A	Yahya Berrabah	Morocco	7.52	x	7.49	7.52	
24	A	Nikolay Atanasov	Bulgaria	7.52	x	x	7.52	
25	B	Tyrone Smith	Bermuda	7.19	7.45	7.43	7.45	SB
26	A	Arsen Sargsyan	Armenia	7.42	x	7.45	7.45	
	B	Wilfredo Martínez	Cuba	x	x	x	NM	

=== Final ===
Rank	Athlete	Nationality	#1	#2	#3	#4	#5	#6	Result	Notes
Gold medal	Fabrice Lapierre	Australia	x	x	8.01	8.09	8.17	x	8.17	
Silver medal	Godfrey Khotso Mokoena	South Africa	7.86	x	7.76	x	7.90	8.08	8.08	SB
Bronze medal	Mitchell Watt	Australia	x	7.93	x	7.88	x	8.05	8.05	
4	Salim Sdiri	France	x	7.93	7.87	8.01	-	7.95	8.01	
5	Christian Reif	Germany	7.86	x	x	7.81	7.83	7.75	7.86	
6	Ndiss Kaba Badji	Senegal	7.64	x	7.72	7.86	7.45	7.71	7.86	
7	Ignisious Gaisah	Ghana	7.46	x	7.55	7.61	7.81	x	7.81	
8	Andriy Makarchev	Ukraine	x	7.65	7.44	x	7.55	7.45	7.65	
