= 2015 World Championships in Athletics – Men's long jump =

Men's long jump at the 2015 World Championships
- Venue: Beijing National Stadium
- Dates: 24 August (qualification); 25 August (final)
- Competitors: 32 from 22 nations
- Winning distance: 8.41 m (27 ft 7 in)

Medalists
gold medal	Greg Rutherford	Great Britain
silver medal	Fabrice Lapierre	Australia
bronze medal	Wang Jianan	China

The men's long jump at the 2015 World Championships in Athletics was held at the Beijing National Stadium on 24 and 25 August.

In the finals were the defending champion Aleksandr Menkov, Olympic Champion Greg Rutherford and world leader Jeff Henderson, however world #2-4 Zarck Visser, Rushwahl Samaai and Marquis Dendy were unable to get out of the rounds. Henderson was the top qualifier with an 8.36 automatic first attempt trial. Three Chinese jumpers made the final at home.

The Chinese made a statement in the first round as both Wang Jianan and Gao Xinglong jumped 8.14 to share the lead. Menkov jumped 8.02 to take the third spot while Rutherford, Henderson and four other jumpers were unable to land a legal jump. In the second round, Henderson got a legal jump of 7.95, two feet below his best of the year, but it put him in 5th place for a moment, then Wang improved to 8.18 and Rutherford popped 8.29 to assume the lead. In the third round Henderson again missed the board. Kafétien Gomis made 8.02 after two fouls, Fabrice Lapierre did 8.10 and Li Jinzhe did 8.09, suddenly the world leader was pushed into ninth place and had no more jumps left. In the fourth round Rutherford put an exclamation point on his lead with an 8.41, but only Gomis was able to make a legal jump in the round. Lapierre jumped 8.20 in the fifth round to move into second place and solidified that standing with an 8.24 in the final round. Rutherford was able to pass on his final two attempts with a healthy lead. Having been hampered by injury in 2013, the victory completed the full set of outdoor championship titles for Rutherford, making him the reigning national (2015), Olympic (2012), World (2015), European (2014) and Commonwealth Games (2014) champion. A month later, he would add the year-long 2015 Diamond League title to his trophy cabinet.

== Records ==
Prior to the competition, the records were as follows:

World record	Mike Powell (USA)	8.95	Tokyo, Japan	30 August 1991
Championship record	Mike Powell (USA)	8.95	Tokyo, Japan	30 August 1991
World leading	Jeff Henderson (USA)	8.52	Toronto, Canada	22 July 2015
African record	Godfrey Khotso Mokoena (RSA)	8.50	Madrid, Spain	4 July 2009
Asian record	Mohamed Salman Al Khuwalidi (KSA)	8.48	Sotteville, France	2 July 2006
North, Central American and Caribbean record	Mike Powell (USA)	8.95	Tokyo, Japan	30 August 1991
South American record	Irving Saladino (PAN)	8.73	Hengelo, Netherlands	24 May 2008
European record	Robert Emmiyan (URS)	8.86	Tsaghkadzor, Soviet Union	22 May 1987
Oceanian record	Mitchell Watt (AUS)	8.54	Stockholm, Sweden	29 July 2011

== Qualification standards ==
Entry standards
8.10

== Schedule ==
Date	Time	Round
24 August 2015	10:00	Qualification
25 August 2015	19:25	Final

All times are local times (UTC+8)

== Results ==
=== Qualification ===
Qualification: 8.15 m (Q) or at least 12 best performers (q).

Rank	Group	Name	Nationality	#1	#2	#3	Mark	Notes
1	B	Jeff Henderson	United States	8.36			8.36	Q
2	B	Greg Rutherford	Great Britain & N.I.	x	8.25		8.25	Q
3	B	Michael Hartfield	United States	x	8.13	–	8.13	q
4	A	Wang Jianan	China	8.12	8.02	–	8.12	q
5	B	Gao Xinglong	China	7.00	8.11	–	8.11	q
6	B	Li Jinzhe	China	8.07	8.10	–	8.10	q
7	A	Kafétien Gomis	France	x	7.66	8.09	8.09	q
8	A	Aleksandr Menkov	Russia	x	7.96	8.08	8.08	q
9	B	Sergey Polyanskiy	Russia	7.87	8.06	x	8.06	q
10	B	Tyrone Smith	Bermuda	7.72	8.01	8.03	8.03	q
11	B	Fabrice Lapierre	Australia	8.03	x	x	8.03	q
12	A	Radek Juška	Czech Republic	x	7.50	7.98	7.98	q
13	B	Godfrey Khotso Mokoena	South Africa	x	7.98	x	7.98	
14	B	Fabian Heinle	Germany	x	x	7.96	7.96	
15	B	Emiliano Lasa	Uruguay	7.95	x	x	7.95	
16	A	Yohei Sugai	Japan	7.92	7.60	7.89	7.92	
17	A	Kanstantsin Barycheuski	Belarus	7.89	x	7.76	7.89	
18	A	Dan Bramble	Great Britain & N.I.	x	7.83	x	7.83	
19	A	Zarck Visser	South Africa	x	7.79	7.78	7.79	
20	B	Rushwahl Samaai	South Africa	7.68	7.79	7.69	7.79	
21	A	Marquis Dendy	United States	x	7.78	x	7.78	
22	B	Ignisious Gaisah	Netherlands	x	7.77	7.71	7.77	
23	A	Maykel Massó	Cuba	7.70	7.04	7.28	7.70	
24	A	Alyn Camara	Germany	7.45	x	7.66	7.66	
25	A	Ahmed Fayez Al-Dosari	Saudi Arabia	7.63	7.24	7.19	7.63	
26	A	Damar Forbes	Jamaica	7.61	7.62	7.61	7.62	
27	A	Higor Alves	Brazil	7.60	x	x	7.60	
28	B	Waisale Dausoko	Fiji	x	6.89	x	6.89	
	B	Alexsandro de Melo	Brazil	x	x	x	NM	
	B	Ifeanye Otuonye	Turks and Caicos Islands	x	x	x	NM	
	A	Michel Tornéus	Sweden	x	x	x	NM	
	A	Quincy Breell	Aruba	x	x	x	NM	

=== Final ===
The final was started at 18:30

Rank	Name	Nationality	#1	#2	#3	#4	#5	#6	Mark	Notes
1st place, gold medalist(s)	Greg Rutherford	Great Britain & N.I.	x	8.29	x	8.41	–	–	8.41	SB
2nd place, silver medalist(s)	Fabrice Lapierre	Australia	x	7.85	8.10	x	8.20	8.24	8.24	SB
3rd place, bronze medalist(s)	Wang Jianan	China	8.14	8.18	8.08	x	x	6.27	8.18	
4	Gao Xinglong	China	8.14	7.87	7.85	x	7.95	8.02	8.14	SB
5	Li Jinzhe	China	7.69	x	8.09	x	8.10	x	8.10	
6	Aleksandr Menkov	Russia	8.02	x	7.98	x	x	x	8.02	
7	Kafétien Gomis	France	x	x	8.02	7.57	x	7.80	8.02	
8	Sergey Polyanskiy	Russia	7.89	7.97	x	x	x	x	7.97	
9	Jeff Henderson	United States	x	7.95	x				7.95	
10	Tyrone Smith	Bermuda	x	7.79	x				7.79	
11	Radek Juška	Czech Republic	7.55	7.57	x				7.57	
	Michael Hartfield	United States	x	x	x				NM	
