= Jarrion Lawson =

American sprinter and long jumper (born 1994)

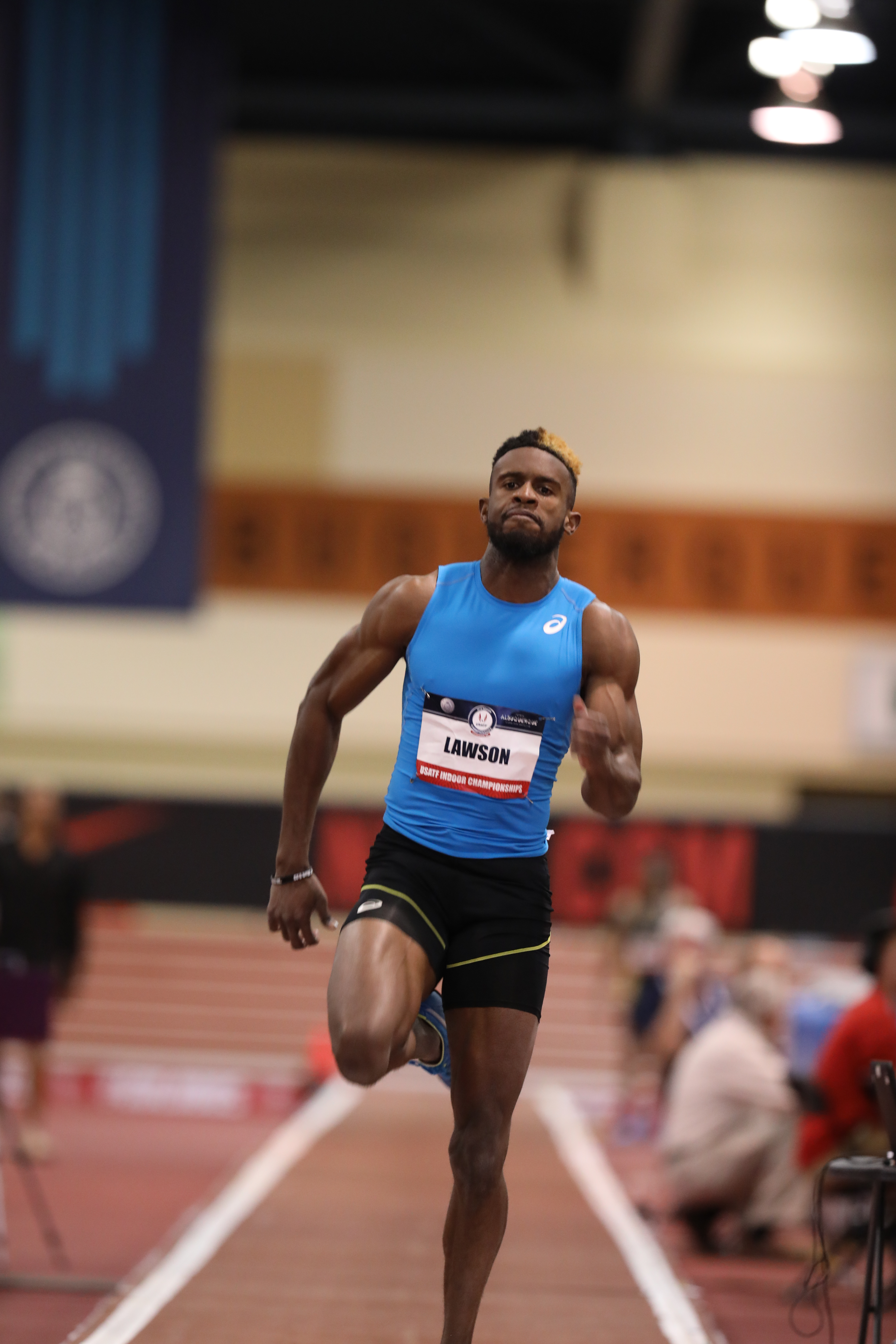
- Lawson during 2018 USA Indoor Track and Field Championships

Personal information
- Nationality: United States
- Born: May 6, 1994 (age 32) Texarkana, Texas
- Height: 6 ft 2 in (188 cm)
- Weight: 172 lb (78 kg)

Sport
- Sport: Track and field
- Events: 100 meters 200 meters Long jump
- College team: Arkansas Razorbacks

Achievements and titles
- Personal bests: 60 m: 6.60i (2016); 100 m: 10.03 (2017); 200 m: 20.17 (2016); Long jump: 8.58 (2016); Triple jump: 15.80 (2012)
Medal record
Men's athletics
Representing the United States
World Championships
Silver medal – second place	2017 London	Long jump
World Junior Championships
Bronze medal – third place	2012 Barcelona	Long jump

Jarrion Lawson (/ˈjæriən/ JARR-ee-ən; born May 6, 1994) is an American sprinter and long jumper. He placed third in the men's long jump at the 2012 World Junior Championships. Competing for the Arkansas Razorbacks, he won five individual NCAA championship titles and one relay title between 2014 and 2016; he won three events (the 100 meters, 200 meters and long jump) at the 2016 NCAA outdoor championships, a triple previously accomplished only by Jesse Owens.

== Career ==
Lawson took up track and his father is Claude Woodberry of Texarkana and field at a young age, but was not initially a particularly promising age group athlete; he made his breakthrough during his freshman and sophomore years at Liberty-Eylau High School in Texarkana, Texas. In addition to track, he played on Liberty-Eylau's football and basketball teams. In June 2012, shortly after graduating from Liberty-Eylau, he won both the long jump and the triple jump at the national junior championships and was selected to represent the United States in both events at the IAAF World Junior Championships in Barcelona. Lawson won bronze in the long jump in Barcelona, jumping 7.64 m (25 ft 3/4 in) on his best attempt; in the triple jump he was eliminated in the qualifying round.

After graduating from high school Lawson attended the University of Arkansas and represented the Arkansas Razorbacks in collegiate competition. As a freshman, he placed fourth in the long jump with a personal best 7.92 m (26 ft 0 in) at the 2013 NCAA indoor championships and helped the Razorbacks win the indoor team title. Outdoors, he won the long jump at the West Regional, but was only 14th at the NCAA meet. He had to drop triple jumping due to knee problems, but started dabbling in the sprints instead; at the NCAA championships he ran the second leg on the Razorbacks' 4 × 100 m relay team, which placed fifth.

Lawson won his first individual NCAA title as a sophomore at the 2014 indoor meet, jumping a personal best 8.39 m (27 ft 6 1/4 in) at the altitude of Albuquerque; he won by more than a foot. Outdoors, he failed to qualify for the NCAA meet individually, but placed second behind Jeff Henderson at the national championships two weeks later. In 2015 Lawson became an individual-event doubler again, as he started running the individual 100 meters; he broke the Arkansas school record in the NCAA championship semi-finals with 10.04 (+1.7 m/s), and placed third with a wind-aided 9.90 (+2.7 m/s) in the final. The Razorbacks won the 4 × 100 m relay. In the long jump, he jumped a season best 8.27 m (27 ft 1 1/2 in) at the NCAA indoor championships and a personal outdoor best 8.34 m (27 ft 4 1/4 in) at the outdoor championships, but lost to Florida's Marquis Dendy both times.

Lawson regained the NCAA indoor long jump title as a senior in 2016, winning with a last-round jump of 7.95 m (26 ft 1 in); in addition, he placed fifth in the 60 meters with a personal best 6.60 seconds. Outdoors, Lawson took up the 200 meters for the first time; at the SEC outdoor championships he won the long jump, placed fourth in the 100 meters and was sixth in the 200 meters. His 200-meter times dropped from meet to meet, and he placed second in his heat with a personal best 20.17 (+1.5 m/s) at the West Regionals; he qualified for the NCAA championships in all three events.

At the 2016 NCAA outdoor championships in Eugene Lawson won the 100 meters, the 200 meters and the long jump, a triple previously achieved only by Jesse Owens eighty years earlier. His individual meet score of 31.5 points, including partial credit for Arkansas' third place in the 4 × 100 m relay, was also the best since Owens. (Note: Owens won four events (the two sprints, the long jump, and the later discontinued 220-yard low hurdles) in both 1935 and 1936.) In the long jump, Lawson took the lead in round four and secured first place with his fifth-round leap of 8.15 m (26 ft 8 3/4 in). He narrowly defeated Tennessee's Christian Coleman in both sprints, running 10.22 (-2.3 m/s) in the 100 meters and 20.19 (-0.2 m/s) in the longer race; LSU's Nethaneel Mitchell-Blake led the 200-meter semi-finals ahead of Lawson, but lost his chances after suffering a cramp in the relay.

=== Professional career ===
Lawson turned professional after the 2016 collegiate season and signed an endorsement deal with ASICS. At the 2016 United States Olympic Trials he broke his personal best in the long jump, jumping 8.58 m (28 ft 1 3/4 in); he placed a close second behind Jeff Henderson and qualified for the Olympics in Rio de Janeiro. He also qualified for the Trials final in the 100 meters, but placed seventh in 10.07 (+1.6 m/s) and failed to make the team in that event.

In March 2020, the Court of Arbitration for Sport (CAS) ruled that Lawson bore "no fault or negligence" for an anti-doping rule violation relating to a positive test for trenbolone which had been carried out in June 2018. He had initially been issued with a four-year ban by the IAAF in June 2019 for the violation, however Lawson successfully appealed to CAS who accepted his explanation that the source for the trenbolone was contanimated meat.

Year	Competition	Venue	Position	Event	Time	Wind (m/s)	Notes
2012	USATF Junior Championships	Robert C. Haugh Complex; Bloomington, Indiana	1st	Long Jump	7.77 m (25 ft 5 3/4 in)	+2.5	
2012	USATF Junior Championships	Robert C. Haugh Complex; Bloomington, Indiana	1st	Triple Jump	15.64 m (51 ft 3 1/2 in)	+0.5	
2014	U.S. Championships	Sacramento, California	2nd	Long Jump	8.13 m (26 ft 8 in)	+2.6	
2015	U.S. Championships	Hayward Field; Eugene, Oregon	5th	Long Jump	8.36 m (27 ft 5 in)	+2.4	
Representing ASICS
2016	U.S. Olympic Trials	Hayward Field; Eugene, Oregon	7th	100 m	10.07	+1.6	
2016	U.S. Olympic Trials	Hayward Field; Eugene, Oregon	11th	200 m	20.50	+0.4	
2016	U.S. Olympic Trials	Hayward Field; Eugene, Oregon	2nd	Long Jump	8.58 m (28 ft 1 3/4 in)	+1.8	
2017	U.S. Championships	Sacramento, California	11th	100 m	10.24	−1.6	
2017	U.S. Championships	Sacramento, California	1st	Long Jump	8.49 m (27 ft 10 1/4 in)	+3.7	
2018	U.S. Indoor Championships	Albuquerque, New Mexico	1st	Long Jump	8.38 m (27 ft 5 3/4 in)	n/a	A, SB
2018	U.S. Championships	Des Moines, Iowa	20th	100 m	10.24	+1.4	
2018	U.S. Championships	Des Moines, Iowa	20th	200 m	21.27	+0.3	
2022	2022 USA Indoor Track and Field Championships	Spokane, Washington	1st	Long Jump	8.19 m (26 ft 10 1/4 in)	n/a	

== Notes ==
Awards
Preceded by Marquis Dendy	The Bowerman (men's winner); 2016	Succeeded by Christian Coleman
