= 2016 United States Olympic trials (track and field) =

2016 United States Olympic track and field trials
- Dates: July 1 - July 10
- Host city: Eugene, Oregon, U.S.
- Venue: Hayward Field
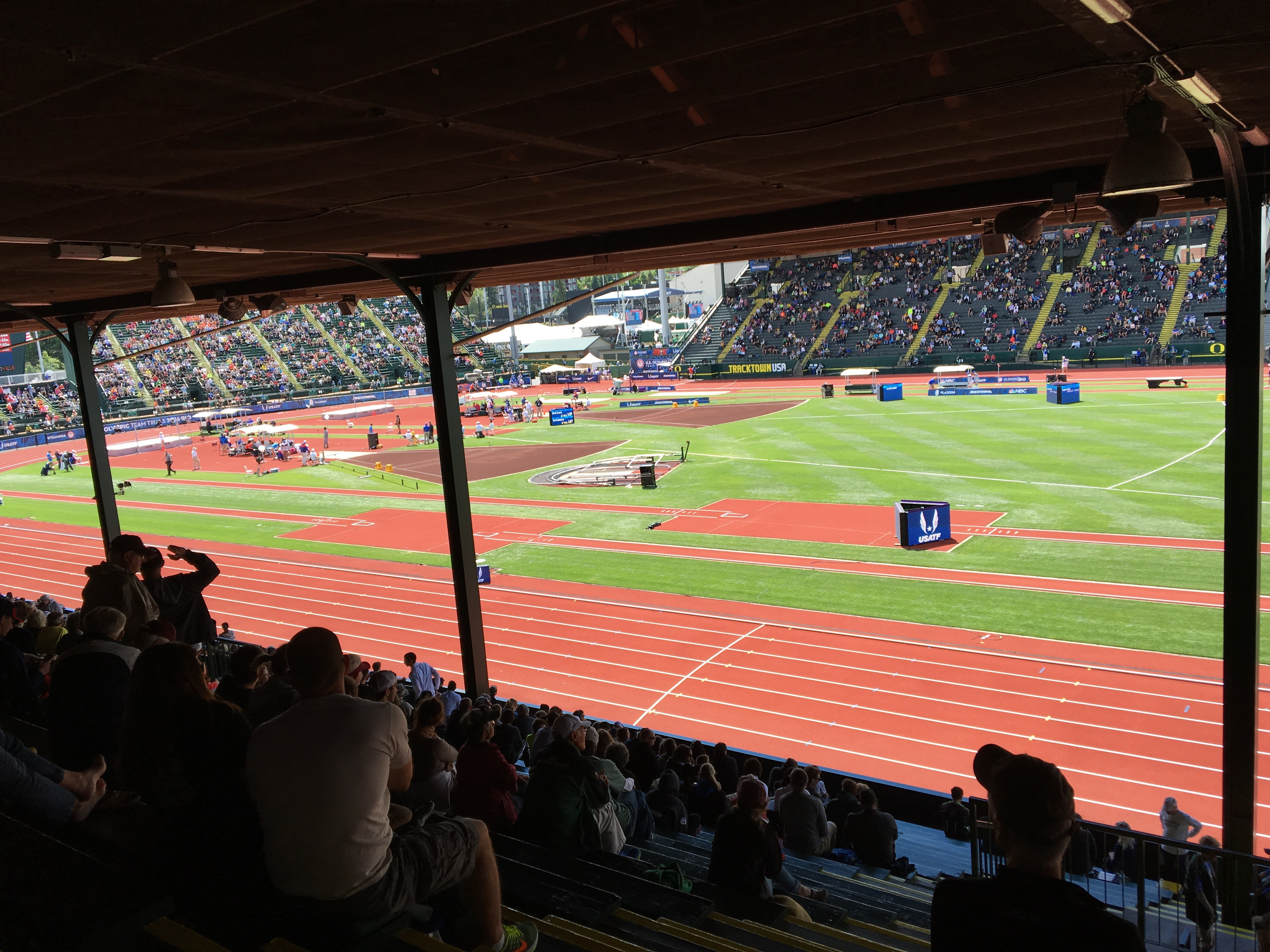
- Level: Senior
- Type: Outdoor
- Events: 40 (men: 20; women: 20)

The 2016 United States Olympic trials for track and field were held at Hayward Field in Eugene, Oregon. Organized by USA Track and Field, the ten-day competition lasted from July 1 to July 10 and served as the national championships in track and field for the United States.

The results of the event determined qualification for the American Olympic team at the 2016 Summer Olympics, to be held in Rio de Janeiro. Provided they had achieved the Olympic standard, the top three athletes gained a place on the Olympic team. If a leading athlete did not hold the standard, or if an athlete withdrew, then the next highest finishing athlete with the standard was selected instead.

The trials for the men's and women's marathon were held February 13 in Los Angeles and the trials for the men's 50 km race walk were held February 21 in Santee, California. The trials for the 20 km race walk were held on June 30 in Salem, Oregon in front of the state capitol. Only the Olympic qualifiers from that race were invited to appear at Hayward Field.

== Men's results ==
Key:
≠ Athlete without Olympic qualifying standard, not selected
Athlete without Olympic qualifying standard, invited to Olympics based on world list position

=== Track ===
Event	Gold		Silver		Bronze	
100 meters (Wind: +1.6 m/s)	Justin Gatlin	9.80	Trayvon Bromell	9.84	Marvin Bracy	9.98
200 meters (Wind: +1.6 m/s)	Justin Gatlin	19.75	LaShawn Merritt	19.79	Ameer Webb	20.00
400 meters	LaShawn Merritt	43.97	Gil Roberts	44.73	David Verburg	44.82
800 meters	Clayton Murphy	1:44.76	Boris Berian	1:44.92	Charles Jock	1:45.48
1500 meters	Matthew Centrowitz	3:34.09	Robby Andrews	3:34.88	Ben Blankenship	3:36.18
5000 meters	Bernard Lagat	13:35.50	Hassan Mead	13:35.70	Paul Chelimo	13:35.92
10,000 meters	Galen Rupp	27:55.04	Shadrack Kipchirchir	28:01.52	Leonard Korir	28:16.97
110 meters hurdles (Wind: +1.0 m/s)	Devon Allen	13.03	Ronnie Ash	13.21 (.205)	Jeff Porter	13.21 (.206)
400 meters hurdles	Kerron Clement	48.50	Byron Robinson	48.79	Michael Tinsley	48.82
3000 meters steeplechase	Evan Jager	8:22.48	Hillary Bor	8:24.10	Donn Cabral	8:26.37
20 km walk^{[a]}	John Nunn ≠	1:25:37	Trevor Barron ≠	1:27:28	Nick Christie ≠	1:27:44

=== Field ===
Event	Gold		Silver		Bronze	
High jump ^{[b]}	Erik Kynard	2.29 m (7 ft 6 in)	Kyle Landon ≠	2.26 m (7 ft 4 3/4 in)	Bradley Adkins	2.21 m (7 ft 3 in)
Pole vault	Sam Kendricks	5.91 m (19 ft 4 1/2 in) CR	Cale Simmons	5.65 m (18 ft 6 1/4 in)	Logan Cunningham	5.60 m (18 ft 4 1/4 in)
Long jump^{[c]}	Jeffery Henderson	8.59 m (28 ft 2 in) (Wind: +2.9 m/s)	Jarrion Lawson	8.58 m (28 ft 1 3/4 in) (Wind: +1.8 m/s)	Will Claye ≠	8.42 m (27 ft 7 1/4 in) (Wind: +5.0 m/s)
Triple jump	Will Claye	17.65 m (57 ft 10 3/4 in) (Wind: +2.0 m/s)	Christian Taylor	17.39 m (57 ft 1/2 in) (Wind: -0.8 m/s)	Chris Benard	17.21 m (56 ft 5 1/2 in) (Wind: -0.9 m/s)
Shot put	Ryan Crouser	22.11 m (72 ft 6 1/4 in)	Joe Kovacs	21.95 m (72 ft 0 in)	Darrell Hill	21.63 m (70 ft 11 1/2 in)
Discus throw	Mason Finley	63.42 m (208 ft 0 in)	Tavis Bailey	61.57 m (202 ft 0 in)	Andrew Evans	61.22 m (200 ft 10 in)
Hammer throw^{[d]}	Rudy Winkler	76.76 m (251 ft 10 in)	Kibwé Johnson	75.11 m (246 ft 5 in)	Conor McCullough	74.14 m (243 ft 2 in)
Javelin throw^{[e]}	Cyrus Hostetler	83.24 m (273 ft 1 in)	Curtis Thompson ≠	82.88 m (271 ft 10 in)	Riley Dolezal≠	79.67 m (261 ft 4 in)
Decathlon	Ashton Eaton	8750	Jeremy Taiwo	8425	Zach Ziemek	8413

=== Notes ===
^{a} None of John Nunn, Trevor Barron and Nick Christie, who finished in top 3 at the US Olympic trials, reached the 1:24:00 qualifying time in the 20 km walk.
^{b} Landon did not achieve the 2.29 m qualifying standard. Ricky Robertson, who finished in a tie for sixth place, was the next highest placed athlete with a qualifying mark and received the third Olympic spot.
^{c} Will Claye did not have the long jump Olympic qualifying standard of 8.15 m; he missed it by one centimeter in the qualifying round, and his best jumps in the final were wind-aided. Fourth-place finisher Marquis Dendy, who also jumped 8.42 m but lost to Claye on second-best jumps, was named to the Olympic team. Fifth-place finisher Mike Hartfield was the alternate and eventually replaced Dendy, who withdrew from the Olympics due to a leg injury.
^{d} No Americans reached the 77.00 m qualifying distance in the hammer throw, but Winkler, Johnson and McCullough were all invited by the IAAF based on their top-32 world list position.
^{e} Curtis Thompson and Riley Dolezal finished second and third at the US Olympic trials but did not achieve the standard. Sam Crouser finished fourth, Sean Furey finished eleventh and both have the qualification standard from 2015.

== Women's results ==
Key: ≠ Athlete without Olympic qualifying standard, not selected.

=== Track ===
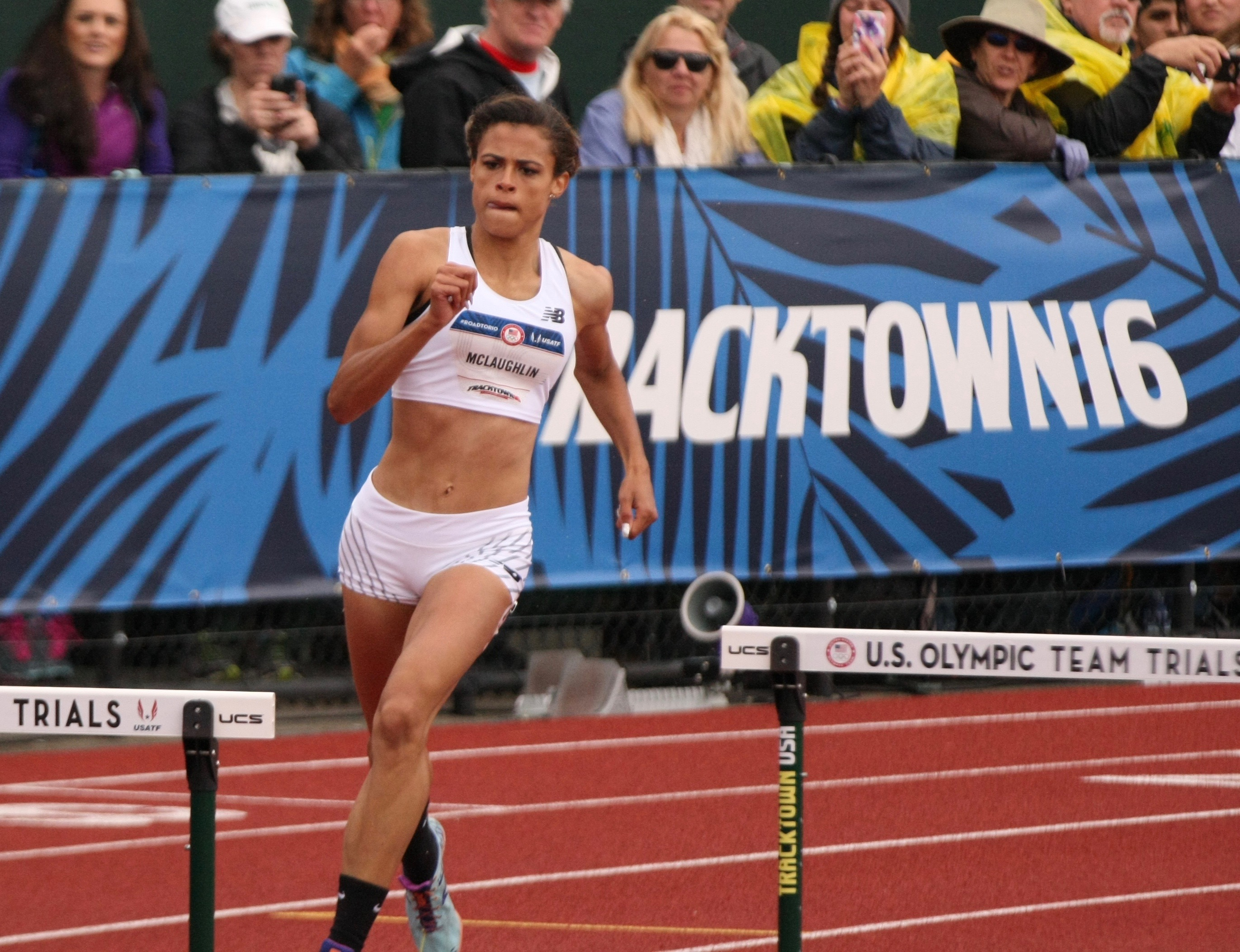
Sydney McLaughlin

Event	Gold		Silver		Bronze	
100 meters (Wind: +1.0 m/s)	English Gardner	10.74	Tianna Bartoletta	10.78 (.778)	Tori Bowie	10.78 (.779)
200 meters (Wind: -0.6 m/s)	Tori Bowie	22.25	Deajah Stevens	22.30	Jenna Prandini	22.53
400 meters	Allyson Felix	49.68	Phyllis Francis	49.94	Natasha Hastings	50.17
800 meters	Kate Grace	1:59.10	Ajee' Wilson	1:59.51	Chrishuna Williams	1:59.59
1500 meters	Jennifer Simpson	4:04.74	Shannon Rowbury	4:05.39	Brenda Martinez	4:06.16
5000 meters^{[d]}	Molly Huddle	15:05.01	Shelby Houlihan	15:06.14	Kim Conley	15:10.62
10,000 meters	Molly Huddle	31:41.62	Emily Infeld	31:46.09	Marielle Hall	31:54.77
100 meters hurdles (Wind: +1.2 m/s)	Brianna Rollins	12.34	Kristi Castlin	12.50	Nia Ali	12.55
400 meters hurdles	Dalilah Muhammad	52.88	Ashley Spencer	54.02	Sydney McLaughlin	54.15
3000 meters steeplechase	Emma Coburn	9:17.48	Courtney Frerichs	9:20.92	Colleen Quigley	9:21.29
20 km walk	Maria Michta-Coffey	1:33:41	Miranda Melville	1:34:12	Katie Burnett≠	1:41:13

=== Field ===
Event	Gold		Silver		Bronze	
High jump	Chaunté Lowe	2.01 m (6 ft 7 in)	Vashti Cunningham	1.97 m (6 ft 5 1/2 in)	Inika McPherson	1.93 m (6 ft 3 3/4 in)
Pole vault	Jenn Suhr	4.80 m (15 ft 8 3/4 in)	Sandi Morris	4.75 m (15 ft 7 in)	Alexis Weeks	4.70 m (15 ft 5 in)
Long jump	Brittney Reese	7.31 m (23 ft 11 3/4 in) CR (Wind: +1.7 m/s)	Tianna Bartoletta	7.02 m (23 ft 1/4 in) (Wind: +2.3 m/s)	Janay DeLoach	6.93 m (22 ft 8 3/4 in) (Wind: +1.7 m/s)
Triple jump	Keturah Orji	14.32 m (46 ft 11 3/4 in) (Wind: +1.1 m/s)	Christina Epps	14.17 m (46 ft 5 3/4 in) (Wind: +0.6 m/s)	Andrea Geubelle	13.95 m (45 ft 9 in) (Wind: +0.9 m/s)
Shot put	Michelle Carter	19.59 m (64 ft 3 1/4 in)	Raven Saunders	19.24 m (63 ft 1 1/4 in)	Felisha Johnson	19.23 m (63 ft 1 in)
Discus throw	Whitney Ashley	62.25 m (204 ft 2 in)	Shelbi Vaughan	60.28 m (197 ft 9 in)	Kelsey Card	60.13 m (197 ft 3 in)
Hammer throw	Amber Campbell	74.03 m (242 ft 10 in)	Gwen Berry	73.09 m (239 ft 9 in) (72.04)	DeAnna Price	73.09 m (239 ft 9 in) (71.66)
Javelin throw^{[e]}	Maggie Malone	60.84 m (199 ft 7 in)	Hannah Carson≠	58.19 m (190 ft 10 in)	Kara Winger	57.90 m (189 ft 11 in)
Heptathlon	Barbara Nwaba	6494	Heather Miller-Koch	6423	Kendell Williams	6402

==== Notes ====
^{d} Abbey D'Agostino, who placed fifth in the 5,000 meters in 15:14.04, was named to the Olympic team after both Molly Huddle, who won, and Emily Infeld, who placed fourth and was first in line to replace her, decided to only run the 10,000 meters at the Olympics.
^{e} Hannah Carson placed second in the javelin throw, but did not have the Olympic qualifying standard of 62.00 m. Brittany Borman, who finished fourth at the Olympic trials, was the only other American with a qualifying mark (64.75 m in 2015) and received the third Olympic spot.
