= Michael Hartfield =

American track and field athlete(born 1990)

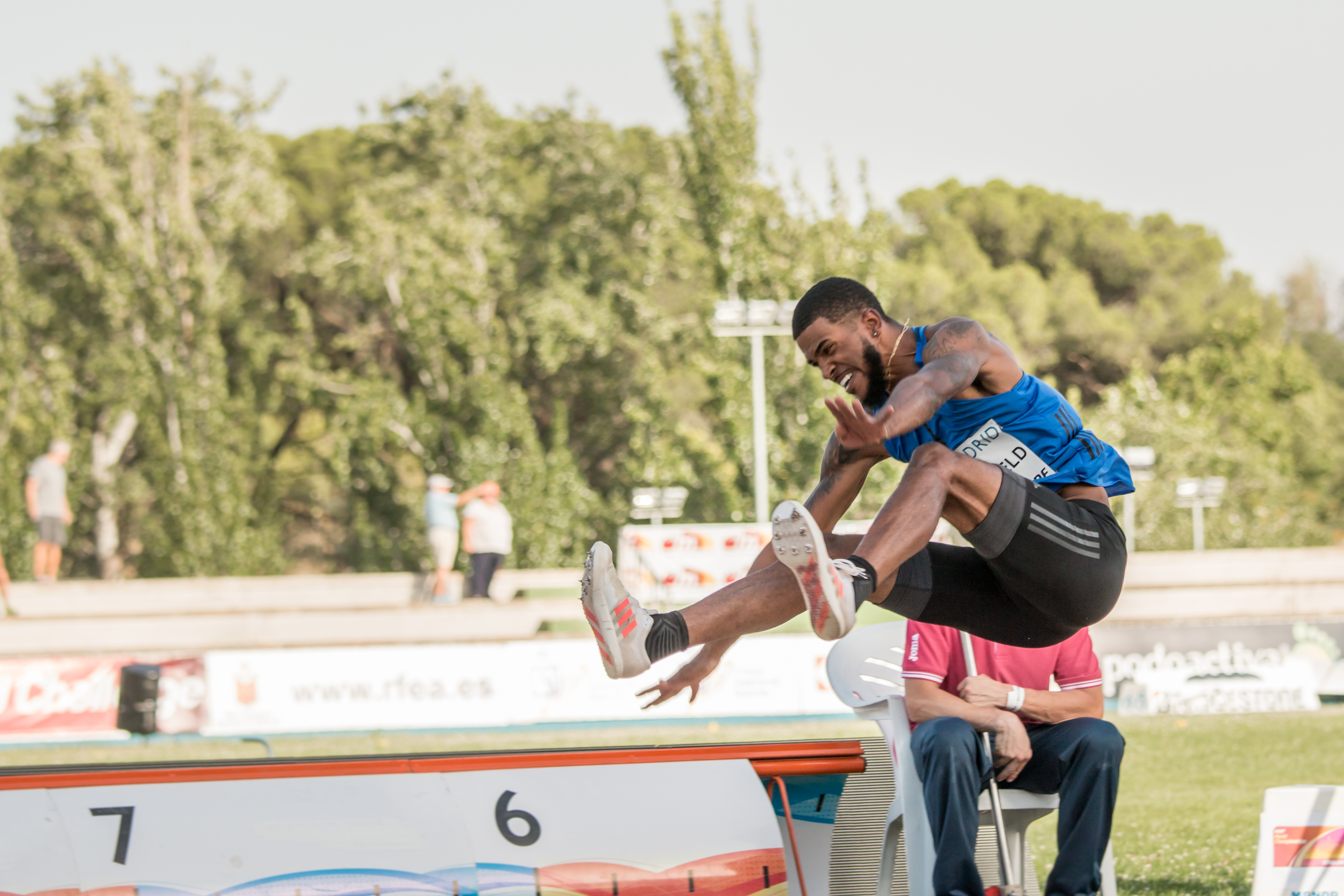
- Michael Hartfield jumping at the IAAF World Challenge Meeting Madrid 2017.

Personal information
- Born: March 29, 1990 (age 36) Manchester, Connecticut

Sport
- Sport: Track and field
- Event: Long jump
- College team: Ohio State Buckeyes

Achievements and titles
- Personal best: 8.34 m (27 ft 4 1/4 in)

Michael Hartfield (born March 29, 1990) is an American track and field athlete who specializes in the long jump. He holds a personal best of 8.34 m (27 ft 4 1/4 in) for the event, set in 2016. He competed in the 2016 Olympics for Team USA in the long jump.

Collegiately, he competed for the Ohio State Buckeyes and broke Jesse Owens 77-year-old school record in the long jump. He had three straight wins at the Big Ten Conference outdoor long jump, and also one indoor long jump and one outdoor triple jump conference title. His best placing at the NCAA Men's Division I Outdoor Track and Field Championships was third in 2013.

== Career ==
=== Early life ===
Born in Manchester, Connecticut, he attended Manchester High School and began to compete in track and field while there. After graduation from there he enrolled at Rend Lake College and competed in National Junior College Athletic Association competition, being a long jump and triple jump finalist at the JUCO Championships in 2009. The following year he won the national junior college title in the long jump and was fourth in the triple jump.

=== College ===
He began study at the Ohio State University in the second half of 2010 and became part of the Ohio State Buckeyes college track team. He established himself regionally with long jump wins at the 2011 Big Ten Conference championships, both indoors and outdoors, also taking runner-up placings in the triple jump both times. At the NCAA Men's Division I Indoor Track and Field Championships he placed fourteenth and achieved the same placing at the 2011 USA Outdoor Track and Field Championships. He improved by one place at the NCAA Men's Division I Outdoor Track and Field Championships.

Injuries prevented him from achieving a high standard in the 2012 indoor season, but outdoors he returned to form with a Big Ten Conference long jump win in a new best of 7.96 m (26 ft 1 1/4 in). He was also fifth in the triple jump. He came eleventh at that year's NCAA Outdoor Championships then had his highest national placing at the 2012 United States Olympic Trials, taking sixth place. In 2013 – his third and final year of competition for the Buckeyes – he skipped indoor collegiate meets and instead competed at the 2013 USA Indoor Track and Field Championships, taking second place behind Jeremy Hicks. Turning outdoors, he broke Jesse Owens' 77-year-old Ohio State school record in the long jump with a personal record clearance of 8.15 m (26 ft 8 3/4 in) at the Texas Relays. A triple jump best of 15.84 m (51 ft 11 1/2 in) followed in Tucson, Arizona. Hartfield became a horizontal jumps double champion at the 2013 Big Ten Conference meet, extending his conference streak in the long jump to three wins at the Jesse Owens Memorial Stadium. In his final collegiate competition he had his first and only podium finish at the 2013 NCAA Division I Outdoor Track and Field Championships, ending the long jump contest in third place.

After the college season, he finished fourth at the 2013 USA Outdoor Track and Field Championships and competed in meetings in Europe for the first time later that year, which included a third-place finish at the Hanžeković Memorial.

=== Professional ===
Hartfield did not perform well at the 2014 USA Indoor Track and Field Championships, managing only twelfth place. Outdoors he was runner-up at the Jamaica International Invitational. Signing a contract with adidas, Hartfield established himself among the nation's top professional athletes with a third-place finish at the 2014 USA Outdoor Track and Field Championships, recording a mark of 8.03 m (26 ft 4 in). He made his IAAF Diamond League debut at the Glasgow Grand Prix, coming second. He equalled his best for second at the Gugl Games and had his best performance on the 2014 IAAF Diamond League at the season-ending Memorial Van Damme meet, placing fourth with a jump of 8.03 m (26 ft 4 in).

He skipped the 2015 indoor season and began outdoors with the biggest win of his career at that point, clearing 8.27 m (27 ft 1 1/2 in) to defeat training partner Jeff Henderson to the top of the podium at the IAAF World Challenge Beijing meet. Turning to the 2015 IAAF Diamond League circuit, he was beaten only by Olympic champion Greg Rutherford at the British Grand Prix in Birmingham and also the Bislett Games in Oslo. At the 2015 USA Outdoor Track and Field Championships he had the longest jump of his career at 8.42 m (27 ft 7 1/4 in), assisted by a strong wind, and returned to the third national spot behind Marquis Dendy and Henderson. This earned him qualification to represent United States at the World Championships in Athletics. His first Diamond League win followed shortly after at the Meeting Areva, beating the reigning world champion Aleksandr Menkov.

Hartfield placed fifth at the 2016 United States Olympic Trials with a wind-aided jump of 8.39 m (27 ft 6 1/4 in). As one of the jumpers ahead of him (Will Claye) did not have the Olympic qualifying standard, Hartfield was named to the American team as an alternate; he received the opportunity to compete at the Olympics after Marquis Dendy withdrew due to an injury.

== Personal records ==
- Long jump outdoor – 8.34 m (27 ft 4 1/4 in) (2016)
- Long jump indoor – 7.98 m (26 ft 2 in) (2013)
- Triple jump outdoor – 15.84 m (51 ft 11 1/2 in) (2013)
- Triple jump indoor – 15.80 m (51 ft 10 in) (2011)
- 100-meter dash – 10.59 seconds (2015)

== Personal life ==
Hartfield is a Christian. Hartfield is married to Rachael Hartfield. They have one son and one daughter together.
