= Fabrice Lapierre =

Australian long jumper (born 1983)

Medal record

Men's athletics

Representing Australia

World Championships
Silver medal – second place	2015 Beijing	Long jump

World Indoor Championships
Gold medal – first place	2010 Doha	Long jump
Silver medal – second place	2016 Portland	Long jump

Commonwealth Games
Gold medal – first place	2010 Delhi	Long jump
Bronze medal – third place	2006 Melbourne	Long jump

Fabrice Lapierre (born 17 October 1983) is a Mauritian-born Australian long jumper.

== Life ==
Lapierre was born on 17 October 1983 in Réduit, Mauritius.

== Career ==
Lapierre placed 4th at the 2009 World Championships in Berlin, Germany, behind another Australian, Mitchell Watt, who took the bronze. At the 2010 World Indoor Championships in Doha, Qatar, Lapierre won the gold medal with a jump of 8.17 metres, beating both Watt and the defending champion Godfrey Mokoena of South Africa.

His personal best jump is 8.40 metres, achieved on 14 July 2010 in Nuoro. Prior to this, his lifetime best was 8.35 metres, achieved on 4 July 2009 in Madrid. He jumped 8.57 metres at the same competition, but there was too much wind (+3.6 metres per second).

On 18 April 2010, at the Australian Athletics Championship in Perth, Lapierre grabbed the national title with a last-round jump of 8.78, again with an illegal tailwind of +3.1 metres per second. This was the longest jump in the world under any conditions since Mike Powell's 8.99 in Sestriere in 1992.

Lapierre competed for Texas A&M University in college, and was the NCAA long jump champion at the 2005 NCAA Outdoor National Track and Field Championships.

In 2011, Lapierre competed in the third season of the Channel Seven television series Australia's Greatest Athlete.

== Achievement s ==
Year	Competition	Venue	Position	Event	Notes
Representing Australia
2002	World Junior Championships	Kingston, Jamaica	14th (qf)	100m	10.48 w (wind: +3.9 m/s)
2002	World Junior Championships	Kingston, Jamaica	2nd	Long jump	7.74 m (wind: -0.8 m/s)
2002	World Junior Championships	Kingston, Jamaica	10th (h)	4 × 100 m relay	40.51
2006	Commonwealth Games	Melbourne, Australia	3rd	Long jump	8.10 m
2006	World Cup	Athens, Greece	8th	Long jump	7.58 m
2008	Olympic Games	Beijing, China	16th (q)	Long jump	7.90 m
2008	World Athletics Final	Stuttgart, Germany	1st	Long jump	8.14 m
2009	World Championships	Berlin, Germany	4th	Long jump	8.21 m
2009	World Athletics Final	Thessaloníki, Greece	1st	Long jump	8.33 m w
2010	World Indoor Championships	Doha, Qatar	1st	Long jump	8.17 m
2010	Continental Cup	Split, Croatia	7th	Long jump	7.70 m
2010	Commonwealth Games	Delhi, India	1st	Long jump	8.30 m
2011	World Championships	Daegu, South Korea	21st (q)	Long jump	7.89 m
2013	World Championships	Moscow, Russia	—	Long jump	NM
2014	World Indoor Championships	Sopot, Poland	14th (q)	Long jump	7.76 m
2014	Commonwealth Games	Glasgow, United Kingdom	4th	Long jump	8.00 m
2015	World Championships	Beijing, China	2nd	Long jump	8.24 m
2016	World Indoor Championships	Portland, United States	2nd	Long jump	8.25 m
2016	Olympic Games	Rio de Janeiro, Brazil	10th	Long jump	7.87 m
2017	World Championships	London, United Kingdom	11th	Long jump	7.93 m
2018	Commonwealth Games	Gold Coast, Australia	12th	Long jump	7.56 m

== Coaching career ==
Lapierre currently coaches in the Huntington Beach area in California with the private coaching service CoachUp.
