= Kanstantsin Barycheuski =

Belarusian long jumper

Personal information
- Full name: Kanstantsin Iharavich; Barycheuski
- Born: 29 May 1990 (age 36)
- Height: 1.91 m (6 ft 3 in)
- Weight: 87 kg (192 lb)

Sport
- Country: Belarus
- Sport: Athletics
- Event: Long jump

Achievements and titles
- Personal best: Long jump: 8.17 (2015)
- Updated on 11 February 2017

Kanstantsin Iharavich Barycheuski (Belarusian: Канстанцін Ігаравіч Барычэўскі; born 29 May 1990) is a Belarusian long jumper. Representing his nation Belarus at the 2016 Summer Olympics, Barycheuski registered his best jump at 8.17 m from the 2015 Znamenski Memorial Meet in Meteor Stadium, Zhukovsky.

Barycheuski competed for Belarus in the men's long jump at the 2016 Summer Olympics in Rio de Janeiro. There, he spanned his opening legal jump at 7.39 m, before committing a cautious foul on his second attempt. Heinle extended his third leap to an invincible mark of 7.67 metres, but it was not enough to progress him beyond the qualifying phase, placing him in twenty-third out of thirty-two athletes.

== Competition record ==
Year	Competition	Venue	Position	Event	Notes
Representing Belarus
2009	European Junior Championships	Novi Sad, Serbia	19th (q)	Triple jump	14.79 m
2015	European Indoor Championships	Prague, Czech Republic	10th (q)	Long jump	7.77 m
2015	World Championships	Beijing, China	17th (q)	Long jump	7.89 m
2016	Olympic Games	Rio de Janeiro, Brazil	23rd (q)	Long jump	7.67 m
2017	European Indoor Championships	Belgrade, Serbia	16th (q)	Long jump	7.50 m
