= Higor Alves =

Brazilian long jumper

Personal information
- Full name: Higor Silva Alves
- Born: 23 February 1994 (age 32) Carapicuíba, São Paulo, Brazil
- Height: 1.83 m (6 ft 0 in)
- Weight: 64 kg (141 lb)
- Spouse: Victória Menezes Alves

Sport
- Country: Brazil
- Sport: Athletics
- Event: Long jump
- Coached by: Rogerio Pereira do Carmo

Achievements and titles
- Personal best: Long jump: 8.19 (2016)
- Updated on 11 February 2017

Higor Silva Alves (born 23 February 1994) is a Brazilian long jumper. A member of the host nation's track and field squad at the 2016 Summer Olympics, Higor registered his best jump at 8.19 m from the Brazilian Championships in São Paulo a month before the Games.

Higor competed for the host nation Brazil in the men's long jump at the 2016 Summer Olympics in Rio de Janeiro. Leading up to his maiden Games, Higor obtained a mark of 8.19 m to successfully earn the national title and clear the IAAF Olympic entry standard (8.15) by four centimetres. In the qualifying phase, Higor spanned his opening legal jump at 7.59 m, but fouled in the succeeding two attempts that saw him tumble down the leaderboard, finishing in twenty-eighth place from a field of thirty-two athletes.

== Personal life ==
Higor is married to Victória Menezes Alves.

== Competition record ==
Year	Competition	Venue	Position	Event	Notes
Representing Brazil
2011	World Youth Championships	Lille, France	–	Long jump	NM
2012	World Junior Championships	Barcelona, Spain	20th (q)	Long jump	7.26 m
2012	South American U23 Championships	São Paulo, Brazil	2nd	Long jump	7.72 m (w)
2013	Pan American Junior Championships	Medellín, Colombia	1st	Long jump	7.95 m
2014	South American Games	Santiago, Chile	6th	Long jump	7.55 m
2014	Ibero-American Championships	São Paulo, Brazil	2nd	Long jump	8.00 m
2014	South American U23 Championships	Montevideo, Uruguay	1st	Long jump	7.60 m
2015	Pan American Games	Toronto, Canada	10th	Long jump	7.60 m
2015	World Championships	Beijing, China	27th (q)	Long jump	7.60 m
2016	Olympic Games	Rio de Janeiro, Brazil	28th (q)	Long jump	7.59 m
2016	South American U23 Championships	Lima, Peru	1st	Long jump	7.80 m
