= Onderdijk =

- Village
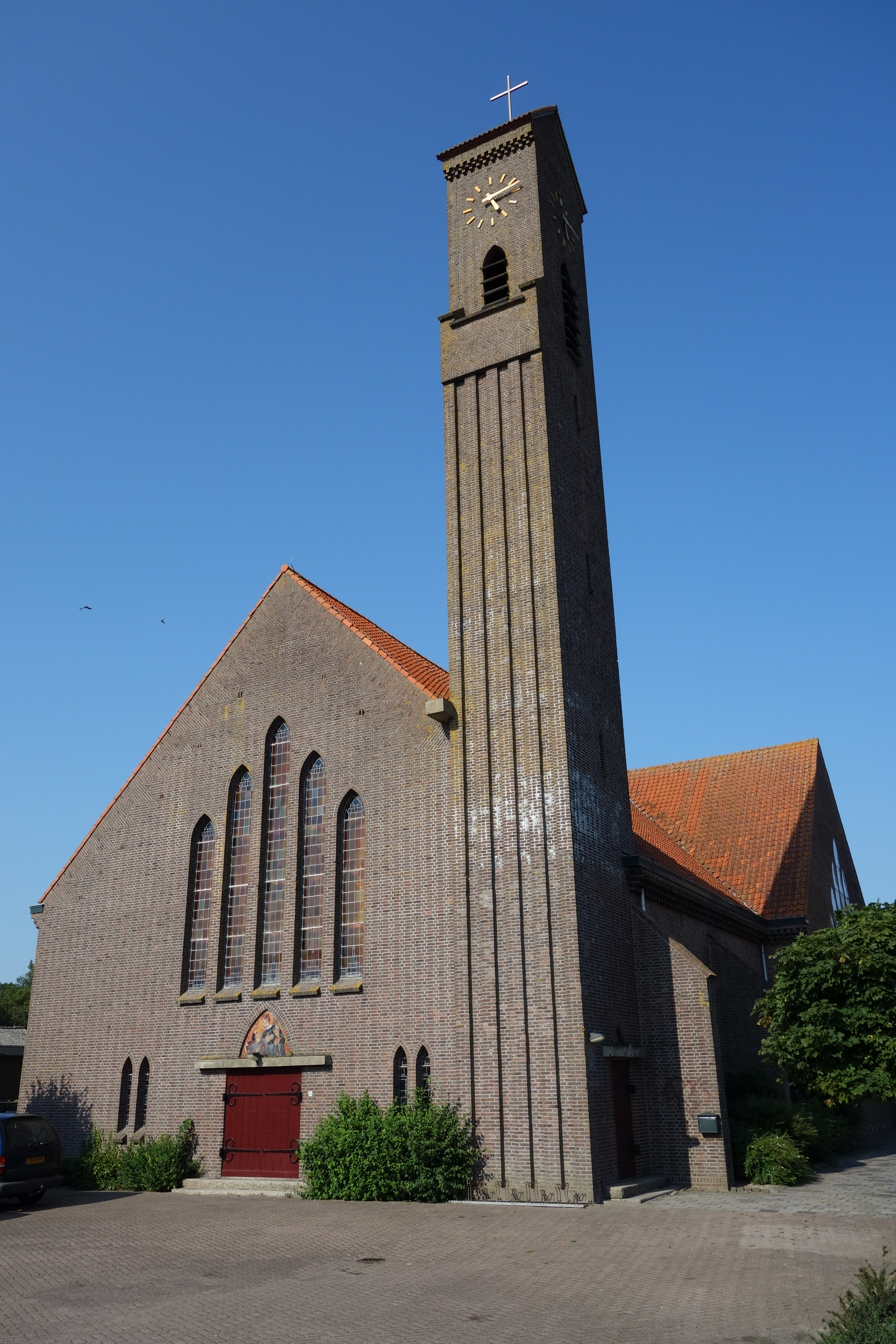
- Cathholic church

- Location in the Netherlands Location in the province of North Holland in the Netherlands
- Country: Netherlands
- Province: North Holland
- Municipality: Medemblik

Population (2025)
  - Village: 1,835
  - Urban: 1,800
  - Rural: 35
- Time zone: UTC+1 (CET)
  - Summer (DST): UTC+2 (CEST)
- Postal code: 1693
- Dialing code: 0228

Onderdijk is a village in the north-western Netherlands, in the province of North Holland and the region of West-Frisia. It has been part of the municipality of Medemblik and was formerly part of the Wervershoof municipality. It is located between both villages.

The local football club is VV Strandvogels.
