= Evelyn Farrell =

Athletics competitor

Personal information
- Born: 10 April 1960 (age 66)
- Height: 1.65 m (5 ft 5 in)
- Weight: 61 kg (134 lb)

Sport
- Sport: Athletics
- Events: 100 m, 200 m

Evelyn Farrell (born 10 April 1960) is a sprinter who competed for the Netherlands Antilles at the 1984 Summer Olympics and for Aruba at the 1988 Summer Olympics. She was the first woman to represent Aruba at the Olympics.

== Career ==
Farrell was 24 years old and the oldest in the 1984 Netherlands Antilles Olympic Team, when she competed in the 100 metres, she was drawn in heat four and ran a time off 11.94 seconds and finished sixth it wasn't quick enough to qualify but was only 0.27 seconds behind Cécile Ngambi who finished fifth and did qualify for the next round, the winner of her heat was Alice Brown who went on to win the silver medal in the final.

Four years later Farrell was representing Aruba at the 1988 Summer Olympics held in Seoul, South Korea, this time she competed in the 100 metres and 200 metres, in the 100 metres she ran a time of 12.48 seconds and finished eighth in her heat so didn't advance to the next round, the winner of her heat was Florence Griffith Joyner who went on to win the gold medal in the event. In the 200 metres she ran it in 25.74 seconds and again finished eighth in her heat so didn't qualify for the next round.

Farrell is now the President of the Aruba Athletic Federation.
