= Kim Reynierse =

Aruban long-distance runner (born 1961)

Kimball Peter "Kim" Reynierse (born 10 January 1961) is an Aruban former long-distance runner who competed in the 1992 Summer Olympics.
