= Cornelia Melis =

Aruban long-distance runner

Personal information
- Born: 23 February 1960 (age 66)
- Height: 1.62 m (5 ft 4 in)
- Weight: 56 kg (123 lb)

Sport
- Sport: Athletics
- Event: Marathon

Cornelia Marina "Lia" Melis (born 23 February 1960) is a long-distance runner who competed for Aruba at the 1988 Summer Olympics and the 1992 Summer Olympics, and at the 1987 World Championships in Athletics and 1991 World Championships in Athletics.

== Career ==
Melis first major international event was 1987 IAAF World Indoor Championships in Indianapolis, United States, she competed in the 3000 metres and finished 11th out of twelve starters and her time 10:24.79 was a new national record, later in the year she was then competing in Rome, Italy, at the 1987 World Championships in Athletics, she entered the marathon and out of the 42 starters she finished in 30th.

The following year she made her first appearance at the Olympics when she competed in the marathon at the 1988 Summer Olympics held in Seoul, South Korea, she finished in 56th place out of 69 starters in a time of 2 hours 53 minutes. In 1989 she went to Stavanger, Norway, to run in the women's race in the 1989 IAAF World Cross Country Championships, she finished in 117th place. Two years later Melis was competing in the 1991 IAAF World Cross Country Championships in the women's race and this time she finished 122nd, later in that year she was back to running the women's marathon at the 1991 World Championships in Athletics in Tokyo, Japan, and after 2 hours 58 minutes she came in 21st out of 39 starters.

Melis competed at the 1992 Summer Olympics, again in the marathon, but unfortunately she was one of the nine runners who didn't finish the race.
