= Damar Forbes =

Jamaican long jumper (born 1990)

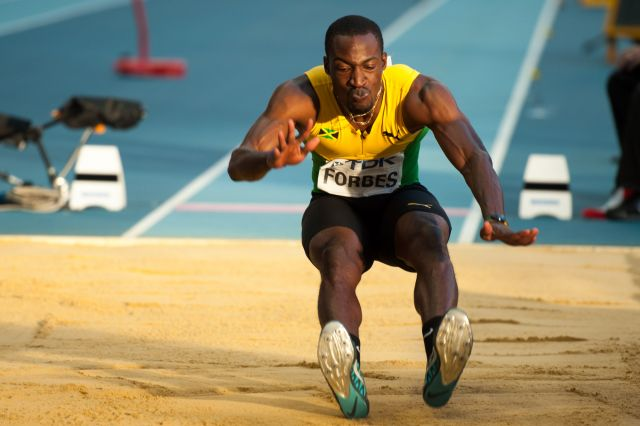
- Forbes at 2013 World Championships

Personal information
- Born: 11 September 1990 (age 36) St Ann, Jamaica

Sport
- Sport: Track and field
- Event: Long jump
Medal record
Representing Jamaica
Central American and Caribbean Championships
Silver medal – second place	2011 Mayagüez	Long jump

Damar Forbes (born 11 September 1990) is a Jamaican long jumper. He has a personal best of 8.29 m (27 ft 2 1/4 in). He was coached by former world champion Dwight Phillips.

Forbes competed in the long jump event at the 2012 Summer Olympics and at the 2011 World Championships in Daegu, South Korea. He was the silver medallist at the 2011 Central American and Caribbean Championships in Athletics. He placed eighth in the final of the 2013 World Championships in Athletics. He also had a win on the 2013 IAAF Diamond League circuit that year, taking the top honours at the Meeting Areva.

While studying at Louisiana State University he competed athletically for the LSU Tigers and was the 2013 NCAA Outdoor champion in the long jump with a jump of (8.35m)w. He won two Southeastern Conference titles and also had four NCAA runner-up finishes (two indoor, two outdoor). He competed at the 2016 Summer Olympics, finishing in 12th place, and the 2018 Commonwealth Games, finishing in 8th.
