= Marquis Dendy =

American long jumper and triple jumper

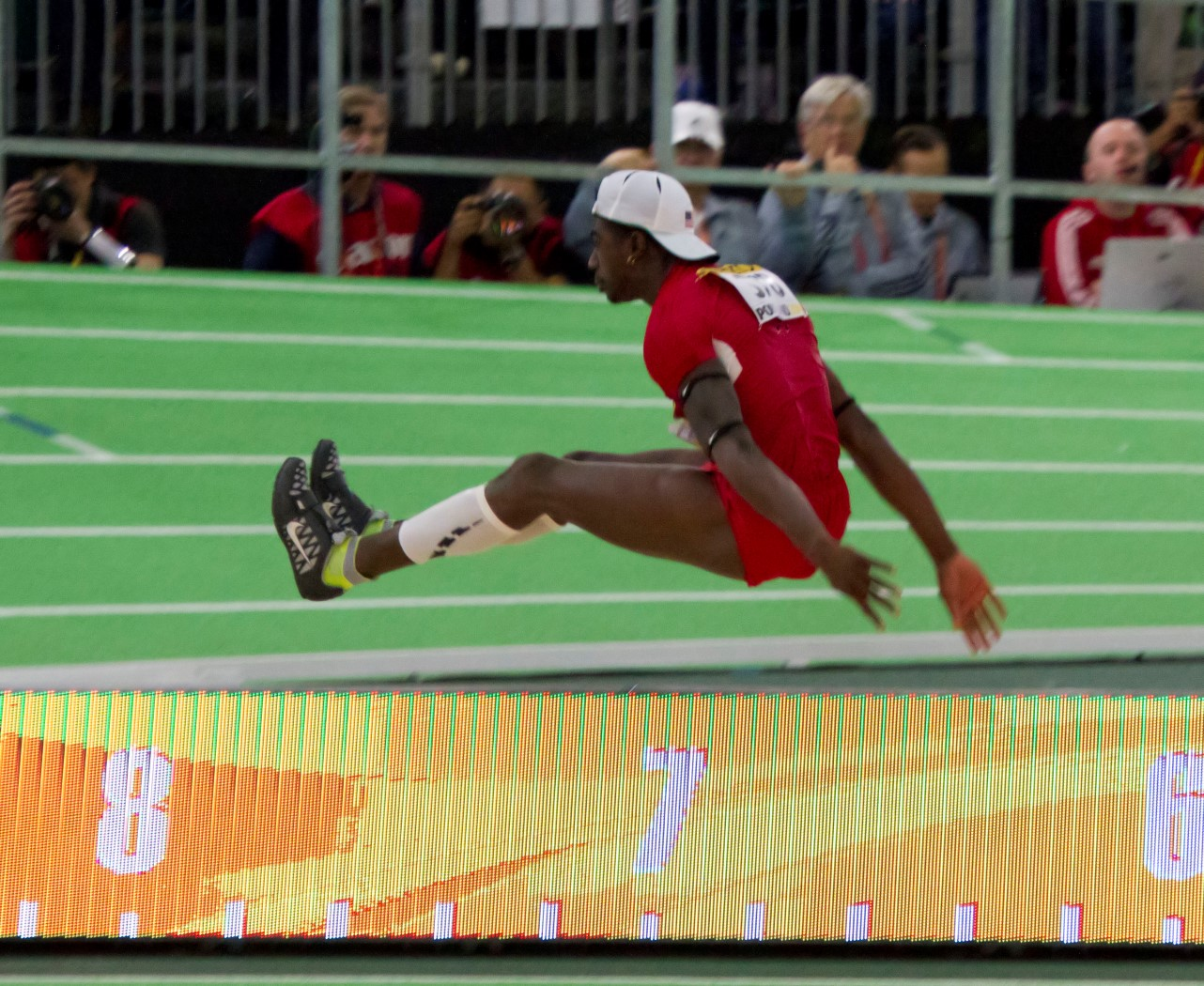

Personal information
- Nationality: American
- Born: November 17, 1992 (age 33) Wilmington, Delaware, United States
- Height: 6 ft 4 in (193 cm)
- Weight: 175 lb (79 kg)

Sport
- Country: United States
- Sport: Track and field
- Events: Long jump, Triple jump
- College team: University of Florida
- Club: Nike
- Turned pro: 2015
Medal record
Men's athletics
Representing the United States
World Indoor Championships
Gold medal – first place	2016 Portland	Long jump
Bronze medal – third place	2018 Birmingham	Long jump
Bronze medal – third place	2022 Belgrade	Long jump
NACAC Championships
Gold medal – first place	2018 Toronto	Long jump
NACAC U-23 Championships
Gold medal – first place	2012 Irapuato, Mexico	Long jump

Marquis Dendy (born November 17, 1992) is an American track and field athlete, primarily known for horizontal jumping events. He is the 2015 National Champion in the Long jump. His winning jump, of 8.68 m (28 ft 5 1/2 in), though wind aided at +3.7mps, his first jump of the competition, was the longest jump in the world under any conditions in over 5 years. He grew up in Middletown, Delaware.

== USA National Track and field Championships ==
Year	Competition	Venue	Position	Event	Result
2023	USA Outdoor Track and Field Championships	Eugene, Oregon	1st	Long jump	8.14 m (26 ft 8 1/4 in)
2022	2022 USA Indoor Track and Field Championships	Spokane, Washington	2nd	Long jump	8.14 m (26 ft 8 1/4 in)
2021	US Olympic Trials	Eugene, Oregon	2nd	Long jump	8.38 m (27 ft 5 3/4 in)
2018	USA Outdoor Track and Field Championships	Des Moines, Iowa	3rd	Long jump	8.04 m (26 ft 4 1/2 in)
2017	USA Outdoor Track and Field Championships	Sacramento, California	2nd	Long jump	8.39 m (27 ft 6 1/4 in)
2016	US Olympic Trials	Eugene, Oregon	4th	Long jump	8.42 m (27 ft 7 1/4 in)
2016	USA Indoor Track and Field Championships	Portland, Oregon	1st	Long jump	8.41 m (27 ft 7 in)
2015	USA Outdoor Track and Field Championships	Eugene, Oregon	1st	Long jump	8.68 m (28 ft 5 1/2 in)
2015	USA Outdoor Track and Field Championships	Eugene, Oregon	3rd	Triple jump	17.23 m (56 ft 6 1/4 in)
2013	USA Outdoor Track and Field Championships	Des Moines, Iowa	3rd	Long jump	8.10 m (26 ft 6 3/4 in)
2012	US Olympic Trials	Hayward Field, Eugene	T-11th	Long jump	7.73 m (25 ft 4 1/4 in) (P)
2011	USA Junior Outdoor Track and Field Championships	Eugene, Oregon	DNS	Long jump	DNS
2011	USA Junior Outdoor Track and Field Championships	Eugene, Oregon	4th	Triple jump	15.44 m (50 ft 7 3/4 in)
2010	USA Junior Outdoor Track and Field Championships	Drake Stadium	4th	Long jump	7.17 m (23 ft 6 1/4 in)
2010	USA Junior Outdoor Track and Field Championships	Drake Stadium	2nd	Triple jump	15.60 m (51 ft 2 in)

== Major Track and Field Championships ==
Year	Championship	Venue	Event	Mark	Place
2022	World Athletics Indoor Championships	Belgrade, Serbia	Long jump	8.27 m (27 ft 1 1/2 in)	3rd
2021	2020 Summer Olympics	Tokyo, Japan	Long jump	7.85 m (25 ft 9 in)	19th (q)
2018	2018 NACAC Championships	Toronto, Canada	Long jump	8.29 m (27 ft 2 1/4 in)	1st
2018	World Indoor Championships	Birmingham, United Kingdom	Long jump	8.42 m (27 ft 7 1/4 in)	3rd
2017	16th IAAF World Championships Outdoor	London, United Kingdom	Long jump	7.78 m (25 ft 6 1/4 in)	20th (q)
2016	World Indoor Championships	Portland, Oregon	Long jump	8.26 m (27 ft 1 in)	1st
2015	15th IAAF World Championships Outdoor	Beijing National Stadium	Triple jump	16.73 m (54 ft 10 1/2 in)	13th
2015	15th IAAF World Championships Outdoor	Beijing National Stadium	Long jump	7.78 m (25 ft 6 1/4 in)	21st
2013	14th IAAF World Championships Outdoor	Luzhniki Stadium, Moscow, Russia	Long jump	7.36 m (24 ft 1 3/4 in)	27th
2012	7th NACAC Under-23 Championships Outdoor	Irapuato, Mexico	Long jump	7.68 m (25 ft 2 1/4 in)	1st
2010	13th IAAF World Junior Championships Outdoor	Moncton, New Brunswick, Canada	Triple jump	15.53 m (50 ft 11 1/4 in)	8th

== NCAA ==
Dendy just had completed his final season at the University of Florida, where he won the 2015 NCAA Division I Outdoor Track and Field Championships in both the long jump and the triple jump, defending his 2014 championships in the same events. He accomplished the same double at the 2015 NCAA Division I Indoor Track and Field Championships, setting the meet record in the triple jump. His first NCAA Championship was the 2013 Indoor Championship in the long jump.

Year	Championship	Venue	Event	Time	Place
2012	Southeastern Conference Indoor track and field Championships	Kentucky - Nutter Field House - Lexington, KY	Long jump	26 feet 5.5 inches (8.065 m)	7th
2012	Southeastern Conference Indoor track and field Championships	Kentucky - Nutter Field House - Lexington, KY	Triple jump	50 feet 3.25 inches (15.3226 m)	1st
2012	NCAA Indoor track and field Championships	Boise State-Jackson's Track - Nampa, ID	Long jump	25 feet 3.5 inches (7.709 m)	8th
2012	Southeastern Conference Outdoor Track and Field Championships	LSU - Bernie Moore Track Stadium - Baton Rouge, LA	Triple jump	50 feet 9.5 inches (15.481 m)	6th
2012	Southeastern Conference Outdoor Track and Field Championships	LSU - Bernie Moore Track Stadium - Baton Rouge, LA	Long jump	24 feet 11.25 inches (7.6010 m)	8th
2012	NCAA Outdoor track and field Championships	Drake Stadium - Des Moines, IA	Triple jump	50 feet 2.5 inches (15.304 m)	20th
2012	NCAA Outdoor track and field Championships	Drake Stadium - Des Moines, IA	Long jump	24 feet 11.75 inches (7.6137 m)	10th
2013	Southeastern Conference Indoor track and field Championships	Arkansas-Randall Tyson Track - Fayetteville, AR	Long jump	27 feet 1 inch (8.26 m)	1st
2013	Southeastern Conference Indoor track and field Championships	Arkansas-Randall Tyson Track - Fayetteville, AR	Triple jump	53 feet 3.75 inches (16.2497 m)	3rd
2013	NCAA Indoor track and field Championships	Arkansas-Randall Tyson Track - Fayetteville, AR	Long jump	27 feet 2 inches (8.28 m)	1st
2013	NCAA Indoor track and field Championships	Arkansas-Randall Tyson Track - Fayetteville, AR	Triple jump	53 feet 1.75 inches (16.1989 m)	4th
2013	Southeastern Conference Outdoor Track and Field Championships	Missouri - Columbia, MO	Triple jump	52 feet 7.25 inches (16.0338 m)	2nd
2013	Southeastern Conference Outdoor Track and Field Championships	Missouri - Columbia, MO	Long jump	27 feet 2.25 inches (8.2868 m)	2nd
2013	NCAA Outdoor track and field Championships	Hayward Field - Eugene, OR	Triple jump	50 feet 9.25 inches (15.4750 m)	18th
2014	Southeastern Conference Indoor track and field Championships	Texas A&M-Gilliam Indoor Track Stadium - College Station, TX	Triple jump	49 feet 0.75 inches (14.9543 m)	11th
2014	Southeastern Conference Indoor track and field Championships	Texas A&M-Gilliam Indoor Track Stadium - College Station, TX	Long jump	24 feet 7.25 inches (7.4994 m)	4th
2014	NCAA Indoor track and field Championships	Albuquerque Convention Center - Albuquerque, NM	Long jump	22 feet 2.25 inches (6.7628 m)	16th
2014	Southeastern Conference Outdoor Track and Field Championships	Kentucky - Lexington, KY	Triple jump	54 feet 2.5 inches (16.523 m)	1st
2014	Southeastern Conference Outdoor Track and Field Championships	Kentucky - Lexington, KY	Long jump	24 feet 7.25 inches (7.4994 m)	10th
2014	NCAA Outdoor track and field Championships	Hayward Field - Eugene, OR	Triple jump	55 feet 11.25 inches (17.0498 m)	1st
2014	NCAA Outdoor track and field Championships	Hayward Field - Eugene, OR	Long jump	26 feet 3 inches (8.00 m)	1st
2015	Southeastern Conference Indoor track and field Championships	Kentucky - Nutter Field House - Lexington, KY	Triple jump	55 feet 8.5 inches (16.980 m)	1st
2015	Southeastern Conference Indoor track and field Championships	Kentucky - Nutter Field House - Lexington, KY	Long jump	26 feet 3 inches (8.00 m)	1st
2015	NCAA Indoor track and field Championships	Arkansas-Randall Tyson Track - Fayetteville, AR	Triple jump	57 feet 0 inches (17.37 m)	1st
2015	NCAA Indoor track and field Championships	Arkansas-Randall Tyson Track - Fayetteville, AR	Long jump	27 feet 2 inches (8.28 m)	1st
2015	Southeastern Conference Outdoor Track and Field Championships	Mississippi St. - Mississippi State, MS	Triple jump	56 feet 11.25 inches (17.3546 m)	1st
2015	Southeastern Conference Outdoor Track and Field Championships	Mississippi St. - Mississippi State, MS	Long jump	26 feet 10.5 inches (8.192 m)	1st
2015	NCAA Outdoor track and field Championships	Hayward Field - Eugene, OR	Triple jump	58 feet 1.25 inches (17.7102 m)	1st
2015	NCAA Outdoor track and field Championships	Hayward Field - Eugene, OR	Long jump	27 feet 8 inches (8.43 m)	1st

== High school ==
Marquis Dendy competed for Middletown High School in Middletown, Delaware where he set the state records in long jump 25 feet 3.5 inches (7.709 m) and triple jump 52 feet 7 inches (16.03 m). After high school he competed for the US in the 2012 NACAC Under-23 Championships in Athletics, winning the gold medal in the long jump. He had previously experienced international competition as a 17-year-old in the 2010 World Junior Championships in Athletics where he finished 8th in the triple jump.

== Personal ==
He grew up in a sporting family: his father was a sprinter at high school while his mother Dionne was a collegiate sprinter. His aunt Terri Dendy was a sprint relay medalist at the 1993 World Championships in Athletics. He shared the Delaware Sportswriters and Broadcasters Association's award as Delaware's Outstanding Athlete of 2014.

Awards
Preceded by Deon Lendore	The Bowerman (men's winner); 2015	Succeeded by Jarrion Lawson
