= Quincy Breell =

Aruban long jumper and basketball player

Personal information
- Born: 19 April 1992 (age 34)
- Height: 1.84 m (6 ft 0 in)
- Weight: 77 kg (170 lb)

Sport
- Country: Aruba
- Sport: Track and field
- Event: Long jump
- Updated on 29 August 2015

Quincy Breell (born 19 April 1992) is an Aruban long jumper. He represented his country at two World Championships, in 2013 and 2015, without qualifying for the final. Before turning to athletics, he was a basketball player.

His personal best in the event is 7.72 metres (+1.9 m/s) set in Cartagena in 2015. This is the current national record.

== Competition record ==
| Year | Competition | Venue | Position | Event | Notes |
Representing Aruba
| 2011 | Central American and Caribbean Championships | Mayagüez, Puerto Rico | 26th (h) | 200 m | 23.19 s |
| 2011 | Central American and Caribbean Championships | Mayagüez, Puerto Rico | 11th (h) | 4 × 100 m relay | 42.35 s |
| 2011 | Central American and Caribbean Championships | Mayagüez, Puerto Rico | 14th | Long jump | 6.69 m |
| 2013 | World Championships | Moscow, Russia | 28th (q) | Long jump | 7.10 m |
| 2014 | South American Games | Santiago, Chile | 12th | Long jump | 6.90 m |
| 2014 | Pan American Sports Festival | Mexico City, Mexico | 10th | Long jump | 7.19 m |
| 2014 | Central American and Caribbean Games | Xalapa, Mexico | 7th | Long jump | 7.44 m |
| 2015 | South American Championships | Lima, Peru | 8th | Long jump | 7.30 m (w) |
| 2015 | Pan American Games | Toronto, Canada | 8th | Long jump | 7.70 m (w) |
| 2015 | NACAC Championships | San José, Costa Rica | 6th | Long jump | 7.52 m (w) |
| 2015 | World Championships | Beijing, China | – | Long jump | NM |
| 2016 | World Indoor Championships | Portland, United States | 13th | Long jump | 7.25 m |
| 2017 | World Championships | London, United Kingdom | 31st (q) | Long jump | 6.90 m |
| 2018 | South American Games | Cochabamba, Bolivia | 7th | Long jump | 7.36 m |
| 2018 | NACAC Championships | Toronto, Canada | 11th | Long jump | 6.93 m |
| 2019 | Pan American Games | Lima, Peru | 10th | Long jump | 7.33 m |
