= Jeff Henderson (long jumper) =

American long jumper (born 1989)

Personal information
- Nationality: American
- Born: February 19, 1989 (age 37)
- Height: 6 ft 0 in (183 cm)
- Weight: 178 lb (81 kg)

Sport
- Country: United States
- Sport: Track and field
- Event: Long jump
- Coached by: Al Joyner

Achievements and titles
- Highest world ranking: 1
- Personal best: 8.52 m (27 ft 11 1/4 in)
Medal record
Olympic Games
Gold medal – first place	2016 Rio de Janeiro	Long jump
World Championships
Silver medal – second place	2019 Doha	Long jump
Pan American Games
Gold medal – first place	2015 Toronto	Long jump
Representing Americas
Continental Cup
Bronze medal – third place	2018 Ostrava	Long jump

Jeffrey Henderson (born February 19, 1989) is an American track and field athlete who competes in the long jump and 100-meter dash. He has a personal record of 8.52 m (27 ft 11 1/4 in) for the long jump by winning the 2015 Pan Am Games gold medal. At the long jump at the 2016 Summer Olympics, Henderson captured gold for Team USA, its first in the event since 2004. Henderson added a silver medal at the 2019 outdoor world championships. Other top results include becoming the 2014, 2016 and 2018 USA Outdoor national long jump champion.

== Career ==
Henderson was raised in McAlmont, Arkansas. While attending Sylvan Hills High School, he won the long jump at the 2007 Arkansas Activities Association Class 6A state high school track and field championships with a 7.29 m (23 ft 11 in) jump, followed by a 7.32 m (24 ft 0 in) jump at the 2007 Arkansas Meet of Champions (MOC) high school meet. Since 2007, he maintains the state high school decathlon record in the 100-meter dash with his 10.84 seconds run. He previously held the Arkansas MOC record in the triple jump with a 14.40 m (47 ft 2 3/4 in) leap.

He went on to study at Hinds Community College, Florida Memorial University and Stillman College where he competed for the Hinds CC Eagles, Florida Memorial Lions and Stillman Tigers track teams. At Hinds CC, Henderson became the NJCAA Division 1 2008 indoor national champion (long jump), 2008 outdoor national champion (long jump, 100 meters), and 2009 outdoor national champion (long jump and 4 × 100 meter relay team).

After finishing second in the long jump 7.94 m (26 ft 1/2 in) at the 2010 USA Indoor Track and Field Championships, Henderson competed at the 2010 IAAF World Indoor Championships, where he finished in 20th place with a 7.64 m (25 ft 3/4 in) jump.

In his junior year at Stillman College, he earned All-America honors at the 2013 NCAA Division II Men's Outdoor Track and Field Championships by winning the 100-meter dash and long jump titles.

At the 2013 USA Outdoor Track and Field Championships, Henderson won the silver medal in the long jump with a 8.22 m (26 ft 11 1/2 in) jump and represented the United States at the 2013 World Championships in Athletics in Moscow, Russia. Henderson competed in the long jump at the 2014 IAAF World Indoor Championships.

At the 2014 adidas Grand Prix, Henderson set a new meeting record in the men's long jump, leaping 8.33 m (27 ft 3 3/4 in). Henderson set a stadium long jump and personal record of 8.43 m (27 ft 7 3/4 in) at the 2014 USA Outdoor Track and Field Championships at the Hornet Stadium in Sacramento, California, taking first place in the event. He also jumped 8.52 m (27 ft 11 1/4 in), however it was wind-aided at +3.5 m/s. After winning the Glasgow Grand Prix, Henderson is a 3-time 2014 IAAF Diamond League winner in the men's long jump.

At the 2015 USA Outdoor Track and Field Championships, Henderson jumped 8.44 m (27 ft 8 1/4 in) to earn a silver medal. At the 2015 Pan Am Games on July 22, 2015, he won with a leap of 8.52 m (27 ft 11 1/4 in). He had previously jumped 8.54 m (28 ft 0 in), but the jump was not counted as it was wind-aided (+4.1 m/s). At the 2015 World Championships in Athletics – Men's long jump, he jumped 8.36 m (27 ft 5 in) in the prelim to advance to the final, and jumped 7.95 m (26 ft 3/4 in) in the final to place 8th.

At the 2016 United States Olympic Trials (track and field), Henderson took first place in the long jump with 8.58 m (28 ft 1 3/4 in)w and took first place with a 8.38 m (27 ft 5 3/4 in) leap and edge past Luvo Manyonga (8.37 m) of South Africa by 1 centimeter in the long jump at the 2016 Summer Olympics. He dedicated his victory to his mother, who has Alzheimer's disease.

Henderson jumped 8.28 m (27 ft 1 3/4 in) to place 5th in the long jump at the 2017 USA Outdoor Track and Field Championships to qualify to the long jump event at the 2017 IAAF World Championships where he placed 17th jumping 7.84 m (25 ft 8 1/2 in).

Henderson jumped 8.10 m (26 ft 6 3/4 in) to place 1st in the long jump at the 2018 USA Outdoor Track and Field Championships to qualify to long jump at the 2018 IAAF Continental Cup and placed 3rd jumping 7.98 m (26 ft 2 in) this result helped the U.S. team to win the global challenge. At the 2018 IAAF Diamond League Final, he jumped 8.11 m (26 ft 7 1/4 in) to place 5th.

== Coaching ==
Henderson coached the Little Rock Trojans track and field team in 2024 and began coaching the Western Kentucky Hilltoppers and Lady Toppers track and field programs in August 2024.
