= Aruba Athletic Federation =

Governing body for athletics in Aruba

- Arubaanse Atletiek Bond
- Sport: Athletics
- Jurisdiction: Federation
- Abbreviation: AAB
- Founded: 1963
- Affiliation: IAAF
- Affiliation date: 1986
- Regional affiliation: NACAC
- Headquarters: Oranjestad
- President: Evelyn Farrell
- Secretary: Nigel Nedd
- Replaced: Nederlands Antilliaanse Atletiek Unie

Official website
- aaf.aw
- (Aruba)

The Aruba Athletic Federation (Dutch: Arubaanse Atletiek Bond, AAB) is the governing body for the sport of athletics in Aruba.

== History ==
AAB was founded on September 6, 1963, and was affiliated to the IAAF in 1986.

Recently, AAB president was Juan "Junior" Dake, and it was reported that he was re-elected in December 2012. However, the IAAF lists former sprinter and two-time Olympian Evelyn Farrell as new president of AAB.

== Affiliations ==
AAB is the national member federation for Aruba in the following international organisations:

- International Association of Athletics Federations (IAAF)
- North American, Central American and Caribbean Athletic Association (NACAC)
- Association of Panamerican Athletics (APA)
- Central American and Caribbean Athletic Confederation (CACAC)
- Asociación Iberoamericana de Atletismo (AIA; Ibero-American Athletics Association)

Moreover, it is part of the following national organisations:

- Aruban Olympic Committee (COA; Papiamento: Comité Olimpico Arubano)

== National records ==
AAB maintains the Aruban records in athletics.
