= 2022 World Athletics Championships – Men's long jump =

Men's long jump at the 2022 World Championships
- Venue: Hayward Field
- Dates: 15 July (qualification); 16 July (final)
- Competitors: 34 from 21 nations
- Winning distance: 8.36 m (27 ft 5 in)

Medalists
gold medal	Wang Jianan	China
silver medal	Miltiadis Tentoglou	Greece
bronze medal	Simon Ehammer	Switzerland

Video on YouTube Official Video

The men's long jump at the 2022 World Athletics Championships was held at the Hayward Field in Eugene on 15 and 16 July 2022. 34 athletes from 21 nations entered to the competition.

== Summary ==
The first round ended with nobody jumping over 8 metres. Indian record holder Murali Sreeshankar, using the mononymous "Sreeshankar", held the lead at 7.96m. In the second round, Steffin McCarter was the first over 8 metres with an 8.04m to open the floodgate. After a Sreeshankar foul, Olympic Champion Miltiadis Tentoglou blasted an 8.30m to take the lead as three more competitors achieved jumps over 8 metres – Marquis Dendy with 8.02m, Maykel Massó with 8.15m, and Simon Ehammer with 8.16m. Halfway through the third round, Wang Jianan joined the group with an 8.03m. Tentoglou jumped farther than all competitors in every round, improving to 8.32m in the fifth round, but the order of the top 8 remained unchanged. On his final attempt, Wang jumped 8.36 m (27 ft 5 in) to leapfrog from fifth to first.

== Records ==
Before the competition records were as follows:

Record	Athlete & Nat.	Perf.	Location	Date
World record	Mike Powell (USA)	8.95 m	Tokyo, Japan	30 August 1991
Championship record	Mike Powell (USA)	8.95 m	Tokyo, Japan	30 August 1991
World Leading	Simon Ehammer (SUI)	8.45 m	Götzis, Austria	28 May 2022
African Record	Luvo Manyonga (RSA)	8.65 m	Potchefstroom, South Africa	22 April 2017
Asian Record	Mohamed Salman Al Khuwalidi (KSA)	8.48 m	Sotteville-lès-Rouen, France	2 July 2006
North, Central American and Caribbean record	Mike Powell (USA)	8.95 m	Tokyo, Japan	30 August 1991
South American Record	Irving Saladino (PAN)	8.73 m	Hengelo, Netherlands	24 May 2008
European Record	Robert Emmiyan (URS)	8.86 m	Tsaghkadzor, Soviet Union	22 May 1987
Oceanian record	Mitchell Watt (AUS)	8.54 m	Stockholm, Sweden	29 July 2011

== Qualification standard ==
The standard to qualify automatically for entry was 8.22 m.

== Schedule ==
The event schedule, in local time (UTC−7), was as follows:

Date	Time	Round
15 July	18:00	Qualification
16 July	18:20	Final

== Results ==
=== Qualification ===
The qualification round took place on 15 July, in two groups, both starting at 18:00. Athletes attaining a mark of at least 8.15 metres ( Q ) or at least the 12 best performers ( q ) qualified for the final. The overall results were as follows:

Rank	Group	Name	Nationality	Round			Mark	Notes
Rank	Group	Name	Nationality	1	2	3	Mark	Notes
1	A	Yuki Hashioka	Japan	x	8.18		8.18	Q
2	A	Marquis Dendy	United States	7.80	8.02	8.16	8.16	Q
3	A	Thobias Montler	Sweden	x	7.83	8.10	8.10	q
4	A	Simon Ehammer	Switzerland	x	7.90	8.09	8.09	q
5	B	Miltiadis Tentoglou	Greece	8.03	x	x	8.03	q
5	A	Eusebio Cáceres	Spain	x	x	8.03	8.03	q
7	B	Murali Sreeshankar	India	7.86	8.00	x	8.00	q
8	A	Henry Frayne	Australia	7.99	x		7.99	q
9	A	Wayne Pinnock	Jamaica	7.74	7.98	x	7.98	q
10	B	Wang Jianan	China	7.98	x	7.69	7.98	q
11	B	Steffin McCarter	United States	7.94	x	7.93	7.94	q
12	B	Maykel Massó	Cuba	x	7.93	7.60	7.93	q
13	B	Emiliano Lasa	Uruguay	7.89	7.82	x	7.89	
14	B	Radek Juška	Czech Republic	x	x	7.87	7.87	
15	A	Ruswahl Samaai	South Africa	6.34	7.86	x	7.86	SB
16	B	Christopher Mitrevski	Australia	7.79	7.57	7.83	7.83	
17	B	William Williams	United States	7.83	7.53	7.74	7.83	
18	B	LaQuan Nairn	Bahamas	7.80	x	7.80	7.80	
19	B	Jovan van Vuuren	South Africa	7.80	x	7.50	7.80	
20	A	Jeswin Aldrin Johnson	India	x	x	7.79	7.79	
21	B	Natsuki Yamakawa	Japan	7.50	7.72	7.75	7.75	
22	A	Huang Changzhou	China	7.59	7.75	7.68	7.75	
23	A	Muhammed Anees Yahiya	India	7.19	7.73	7.58	7.73	
24	B	Tristan James	Dominica	x	7.72	7.59	7.72	
25	A	José Luis Mandros	Peru	x	7.71	x	7.71	
26	A	Kristian Pulli	Finland	7.55	7.56	7.31	7.56	
27	A	Samory Fraga	Brazil	x	7.51	6.77	7.51	
28	A	Salim Saleh Mus Al Yarabi	Oman	x	7.43	7.29	7.43	
29	B	Benjamin Gföhler	Switzerland	7.41	7.39	7.40	7.41	
	A	Cheswill Johnson	South Africa	x	x	x	NM	
	B	Héctor Santos	Spain	x	x	x	NM	
	B	Tajay Gayle	Jamaica	x	x	x	NM	

=== Final ===
The final took place on 16 July and started at 18:20. The results were as follows:

Rank	Name	Nationality	Round						Mark	Notes
Rank	Name	Nationality	1	2	3	4	5	6	Mark	Notes
1st place, gold medalist(s)	Wang Jianan	China	7.94	x	8.03	x	8.03	8.36	8.36	SB
2nd place, silver medalist(s)	Miltiadis Tentoglou	Greece	x	8.30	8.29	8.24	8.32	8.20	8.32	
3rd place, bronze medalist(s)	Simon Ehammer	Switzerland	6.42	8.16	7.78	x	x	7.94	8.16	
4	Maykel Massó	Cuba	x	8.15	x	7.79	8.02	7.88	8.15	SB
5	Steffin McCarter	United States	7.87	8.04	x	7.88	7.87	x	8.04	
6	Marquis Dendy	United States	x	8.02	7.98	x	x	x	8.02	
7	Sreeshankar	India	7.96	x	x	7.89	x	7.83	7.96	
8	Eusebio Cáceres	Spain	7.91	x	7.93	x	x	x	7.93	
9	Wayne Pinnock	Jamaica	7.33	7.88	7.84				7.88	
10	Yuki Hashioka	Japan	x	x	7.86				7.86	
11	Thobias Montler	Sweden	6.12	7.74	7.81				7.81	
12	Henry Frayne	Australia	x	7.80	x				7.80	
