= 2022 World Athletics Championships – Women's javelin throw =

Women's javelin throw at the 2022 World Championships
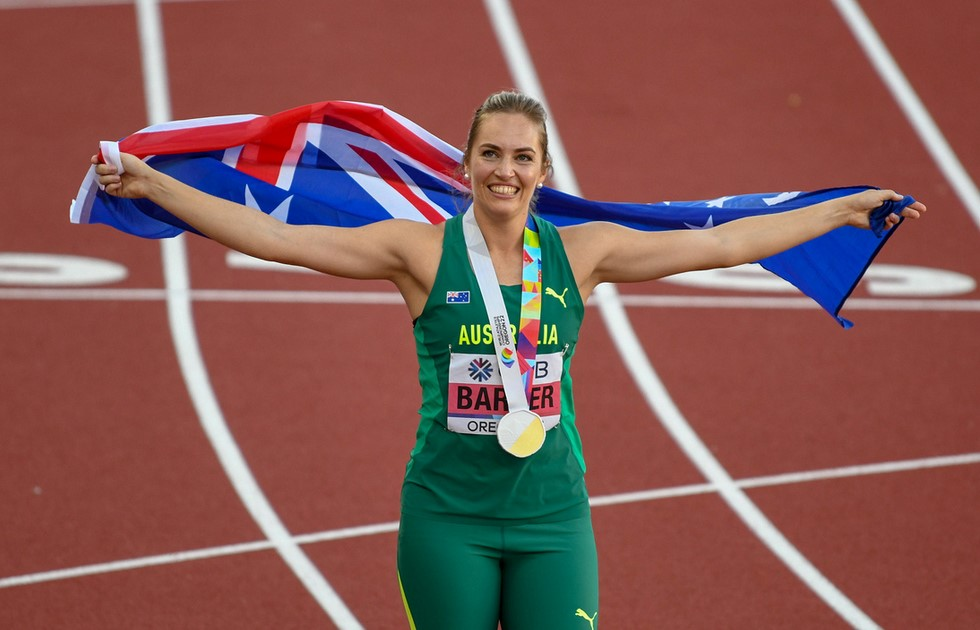
- Kelsey-Lee Barber shortly after winning the final.
- Venue: Hayward Field
- Dates: 20 July (qualification); 22 July (final)
- Competitors: 32 from 23 nations
- Winning distance: 66.91

Medalists
gold medal	Kelsey-Lee Barber	Australia
silver medal	Kara Winger	United States
bronze medal	Haruka Kitaguchi	Japan

Video on YouTube Official Video

The women's javelin throw at the 2022 World Athletics Championships was held at the Hayward Field in Eugene on 20 and 22 July 2022.

== Summary ==
Kelsey-Lee Barber was back as the defending champion, but she was unable to get an automatic qualifier in the trial round, taking all three throws. Haruka Kitaguchi, Liu Shiying and Liveta Jasiūnaitė made an auto qualifier on their first attempt and were able to relax.

In the final as the second thrower, Barber's teammate Mackenzie Little took the first round lead with a 63.22m. Barber's 62.67m did put Australia in the top two spots. In the third round, Barber threw a 66.91 m (219 ft 6 in) to reverse the first two spots and move into the lead. Kitaguchi was back in third position with a 62.07m. In the fourth round, Liu edged into third position with a 63.25m. In the final round, Kara Winger brought cheers from the home crowd with her 64.05m, to jump from fifth to second. With her final attempt, Kitaguchi, threw a 63.27m to snatch the bronze medal

== Records ==
Before the competition records were as follows:

Record	Athlete & Nat.	Perf.	Location	Date
World record	Barbora Špotáková (CZE)	72.28 m	Stuttgart, Germany	13 September 2008
Championship record	Osleidys Menéndez (CUB)	71.70 m	Helsinki, Finland	14 August 2005
World Leading	Maggie Malone (USA)	65.73 m	Burnaby, Canada	14 June 2022
African Record	Sunette Viljoen (RSA)	69.35 m	New York City, United States	9 June 2012
Asian Record	Lyu Huihui (CHN)	67.98 m	Shenyang, China	2 August 2019
North, Central American and Caribbean record	Osleidys Menéndez (CUB)	71.70 m	Helsinki, Finland	14 August 2005
South American Record	Flor Ruiz (COL)	63.84 m	Cali, Colombia	25 June 2016
European Record	Barbora Špotáková (CZE)	72.28 m	Stuttgart, Germany	13 September 2008
Oceanian record	Kathryn Mitchell (AUS)	68.92 m	Gold Coast, Australia	11 April 2018

== Qualification standard ==
The standard to qualify automatically for entry was 64.00 m.

== Schedule ==
The event schedule, in local time (UTC−7), was as follows:

Date	Time	Round
20 July	15:20	Qualification
22 July	18:20	Final

== Results ==
=== Qualification ===
Qualification: Qualifying distance 62.50 (Q) or the 12 best athletes including ties (q) qualify to the final.

Rank	Group	Name	Nationality	Round			Mark	Notes
Rank	Group	Name	Nationality	1	2	3	Mark	Notes
1	B	Haruka Kitaguchi	Japan	64.32			64.32	Q, SB
2	B	Liu Shiying	China	63.86			63.86	Q, SB
3	A	Liveta Jasiūnaitė	Lithuania	63.80			63.80	Q, SB
4	A	Kara Winger	United States	58.12	61.30	54.86	61.30	q
5	B	Kelsey-Lee Barber	Australia	58.02	61.27	57.71	61.27	q
6	B	Nikola Ogrodníková	Czech Republic	60.59	59.07	–	60.59	q
7	A	Elizabeth Gleadle	Canada	x	60.38	x	60.38	q
8	B	Annu Rani	India	x	55.35	59.60	59.60	q
9	A	Annika Marie Fuchs	Germany	55.18	59.36	x	59.36	q
10	B	Līna Mūze	Latvia	59.16	x	53.38	59.16	q
11	B	Sae Takemoto	Japan	57.10	59.15	54.51	59.15	q
12	A	Mackenzie Little	Australia	55.74	52.34	59.06	59.06	q
13	A	Madara Palameika	Latvia	x	58.02	58.61	58.61	SB
14	B	Coralys Ortiz	Puerto Rico	58.52	x	55.27	58.52	
15	B	Jo-Ane van Dyk	South Africa	54.89	57.79	x	57.79	
16	A	Lü Huihui	China	53.75	57.59	56.97	57.59	SB
17	B	Juleisy Angulo	Ecuador	54.23	57.28	x	57.28	
18	A	Ariana Ince	United States	57.17	56.71	57.24	57.24	
19	A	Jucilene de Lima	Brazil	57.13	x	x	57.13	
20	A	Elina Tzengko	Greece	55.44	57.12	x	57.12	
21	B	Maria Andrejczyk	Poland	x	55.47	54.67	55.47	
22	B	Maggie Malone	United States	54.19	54.12	x	54.19	
23	A	Victoria Hudson	Austria	x	x	54.05	54.05	
24	B	Tori Peeters	New Zealand	x	52.03	53.67	53.67	
25	B	Kathryn Mitchell	Australia	x	x	53.09	53.09	
26	A	Sanne Erkkola	Finland	52.04	x	x	52.04	
27	A	Momone Ueda	Japan	47.36	50.70	49.51	50.70	
	B	Eda Tuğsuz	Turkey	x	x	x	NM	
	A	Sara Kolak	Croatia	x	x	x	NM	

=== Final ===
Rank	Name	Nationality	Round						Mark	Notes
Rank	Name	Nationality	1	2	3	4	5	6	Mark	Notes
1st place, gold medalist(s)	Kelsey-Lee Barber	Australia	62.67	62.92	66.91	61.20	–	–	66.91	WL
2nd place, silver medalist(s)	Kara Winger	United States	56.93	61.96	61.00	58.78	62.17	64.05	64.05	
3rd place, bronze medalist(s)	Haruka Kitaguchi	Japan	62.07	x	55.78	61.27	x	63.27	63.27	
4	Liu Shiying	China	61.67	x	60.22	63.25	61.75	x	63.25	
5	Mackenzie Little	Australia	63.22	49.78	59.10	58.50	54.99	x	63.22	PB
6	Līna Mūze	Latvia	59.83	x	x	61.26	x	x	61.26	
7	Annu Rani	India	56.18	61.12	59.27	58.14	59.98	58.70	61.12	
8	Nikola Ogrodníková	Czech Republic	54.11	56.04	59.98	59.48	58.79	60.18	60.18	
9	Elizabeth Gleadle	Canada	59.59	x	x				59.59	
10	Liveta Jasiūnaitė	Lithuania	58.97	x	57.23				58.97	
11	Sae Takemoto	Japan	54.77	57.93	x				57.93	
12	Annika Marie Fuchs	Germany	55.42	56.46	x				56.46	
