= 2022 World Athletics Championships – Men's 3000 metres steeplechase =

Men's 3000 metres steeplechase at the 2022 World Championships
- Venue: Hayward Field
- Dates: 15 July (heats); 18 July (final)
- Competitors: 44 from 22 nations
- Winning time: 8:25.13

Medalists
gold medal	Soufiane El Bakkali	Morocco
silver medal	Lamecha Girma	Ethiopia
bronze medal	Conseslus Kipruto	Kenya

The men's 3000 metres steeplechase at the 2022 World Athletics Championships was held at the Hayward Field in Eugene on 15 and 18 July 2022.

== Summary ==
From the start, the field deferred to Sebastián Martos, marked by Evan Jager, in turn marked by his teammate Hillary Bor. After a slow 2 and a half laps, Lamecha Girma moved up to the point. He too did not push the pace, so defending champion Conseslus Kipruto came forward. Still nobody wanted too push, the pack was packed together at points 5 abreast across the track, waiting for the pace to increase. As they entered the penultimate lap the pace did increase, Leonard Bett tripping and falling out the back of the pack. Yemane Haileselassie took over the lead heading into the bell. At the start of the final lap Getnet Wale took the lead, Hailemariyam Amare came up to join him but fell over the first barrier on the backstretch, where so many runs to victory have been launched. After biding his time for 7 laps, world leader Soufiane El Bakkali went from third place to a two meter lead over Kipruto through the final water jump. Kipruto couldn't accelerate with El Bakkali, Girma went around him to try to chase, but El Bakkali was gone, expanding his lead a couple more meters to the finish. Kipruto was slowing to the finish but was able to hold off a streaking finish by Wale for bronze.

== Records ==
Before the competition records were as follows:

Record	Athlete & Nat.	Perf.	Location	Date
World record	Saif Saaeed Shaheen (QAT)	7:53.63	Brussels, Belgium	3 September 2004
Championship record	Ezekiel Kemboi (KEN)	8:00.43	Berlin, Germany	18 August 2009
World Leading	Soufiane El Bakkali (MAR)	7:58.28	Rabat, Morocco	5 June 2022
African Record	Brimin Kiprop Kipruto (KEN)	7:53.64	Monte Carlo, Monaco	22 July 2011
Asian Record	Saif Saaeed Shaheen (QAT)	7:53.63	Brussels, Belgium	3 September 2004
North, Central American and Caribbean record	Evan Jager (USA)	8:00.45	Paris, France	4 July 2015
South American Record	Wander do Prado Moura (BRA)	8:14.41	Mar del Plata, Argentina	22 March 1995
European Record	Mahiedine Mekhissi (FRA)	8:00.09	Paris, France	6 July 2013
Oceanian record	Peter Renner (NZL)	8:14.05	Koblenz, West Germany	29 August 1984

== Qualification standard ==
The standard to qualify automatically for entry was 8:22.00.

== Schedule ==
The event schedule, in local time (UTC−7), was as follows:

Date	Time	Round
15 July	17:15	Heats
18 July	19:20	Final

== Results ==
=== Heats ===
The first 3 athletes in each heat (Q) and the next 6 fastest (q) qualified to the final.

Rank	Heat	Name	Nationality	Time	Notes
1	1	Soufiane El Bakkali	Morocco	8:16.65	Q
2	1	Leonard Bett	Kenya	8:16.94	Q
3	1	Abraham Kibiwot	Kenya	8:17.04	Q
4	1	Getnet Wale	Ethiopia	8:17.49	q
5	3	Hailemariyam Amare	Ethiopia	8:18.34	Q
6	3	Evan Jager	United States	8:18.44	Q
7	3	Avinash Sable	India	8:18.75	Q
8	3	Yemane Haileselassie	Eritrea	8:18.75	q, SB
9	1	Sebastián Martos	Spain	8:18.94	q
10	2	Lamecha Girma	Ethiopia	8:19.64	Q
11	2	Conseslus Kipruto	Kenya	8:20.12	Q
12	2	Hillary Bor	United States	8:20.18	Q
13	2	Mehdi Belhadj	France	8:20.47	q
14	1	Ahmed Abdelwahed	Italy	8:21.04	q
15	3	Daniel Arce	Spain	8:21.06	q
16	2	Ryuji Miura	Japan	8:21.80	
17	1	Benard Keter	United States	8:21.94	
18	3	Mohamed Amin Jhinaoui	Tunisia	8:22.00	
19	3	Benjamin Kigen	Kenya	8:22.52	
20	2	Edward Trippas	Australia	8:23.83	
21	3	Karl Bebendorf	Germany	8:25.73	SB
22	2	Mohamed Ismail	Djibouti	8:25.85	
23	2	Tom Erling Kårbø	Norway	8:26.12	PB
24	1	John Gay	Canada	8:27.02	
25	2	Hichem Bouchicha	Algeria	8:27.39	
26	2	Ahmed Jaziri	Tunisia	8:28.28	
27	1	Ben Buckingham	Australia	8:29.15	
28	1	Kosei Yamaguchi	Japan	8:30.92	
29	3	Jacob Boutera	Norway	8:31.47	
30	2	Víctor Ruiz	Spain	8:33.42	
31	2	Ryan Smeeton	Canada	8:33.51	
32	3	Vidar Johansson	Sweden	8:33.51	
33	3	Ryoma Aoki	Japan	8:33.89	
34	1	Bilal Tabti	Algeria	8:38.45	
35	2	Salaheddine Ben Yazide	Morocco	8:38.46	
36	3	Jean-Simon Desgagnés	Canada	8:40.90	
37	3	Topi Raitanen	Finland	8:43.01	
38	1	Frederik Ruppert	Germany	8:45.55	
39	2	Carlos San Martín	Colombia	8:48.66	
40	1	Tim Van De Velde	Belgium	9:03.11	
	3	Mohamed Tindouft	Morocco	DNF	

=== Final ===
The final was started on 18 July at 19:22.

Rank	Name	Nationality	Time	Notes
1st place, gold medalist(s)	Soufiane El Bakkali	Morocco	8:25.13	
2nd place, silver medalist(s)	Lamecha Girma	Ethiopia	8:26.01	
3rd place, bronze medalist(s)	Conseslus Kipruto	Kenya	8:27.92	
4	Getnet Wale	Ethiopia	8:28.68	
5	Abraham Kibiwot	Kenya	8:28.95	
6	Evan Jager	United States	8:29.08	
7	Yemane Haileselassie	Eritrea	8:29.40	
8	Hillary Bor	United States	8:29.77	
9	Daniel Arce	Spain	8:30.05	
10	Hailemariyam Amare	Ethiopia	8:31.54	
11	Avinash Sable	India	8:31.75	
12	Ahmed Abdelwahed	Italy	8:33.43	
13	Mehdi Belhadj	France	8:34.49	
14	Sebastián Martos	Spain	8:36.66	
15	Leonard Bett	Kenya	8:36.74	
