= 2022 World Athletics Championships – Men's 400 metres =

Men's 400 metres at the 2022 World Championships
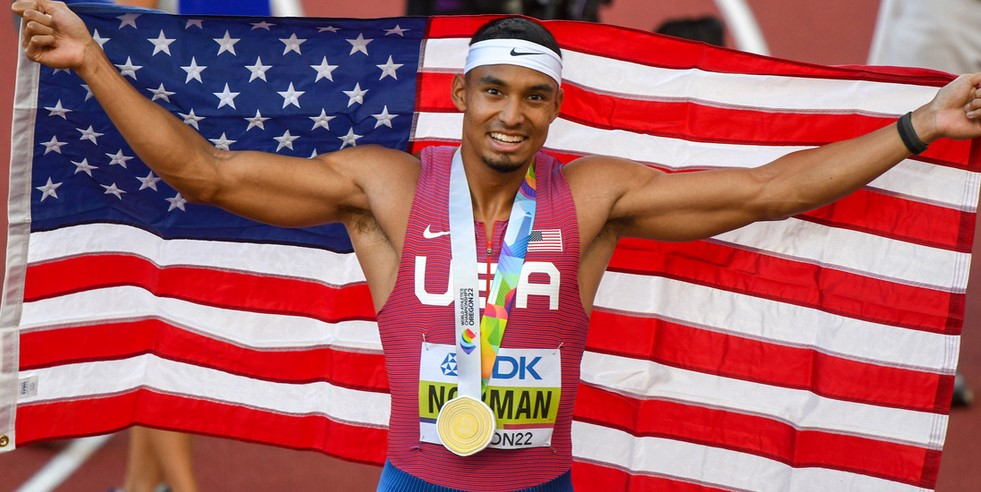
- Michael Norman shortly after the final.
- Venue: Hayward Field
- Dates: 17 July (heats); 20 July (semi-finals); 22 July (final)
- Competitors: 48 from 31 nations
- Winning time: 44.29

Medalists
gold medal	Michael Norman	United States
silver medal	Kirani James	Grenada
bronze medal	Matthew Hudson-Smith	Great Britain

Video on YouTube Official Video

The men's 400 metres at the 2022 World Athletics Championships was held at the Hayward Field in Eugene from 17 to 22 July 2022. The winning margin was 0.19 seconds.

== Summary ==
The semi-final took every athlete who broke 45 seconds into the final. By contrast, in 2015, sixteen athletes broke 45 in the semi-final round. 2015 was the second World Championships for two of the finalists, both former champions, Kirani James and world record holder Wayde van Niekerk. After what should have been a career-ending knee injury, it was remarkable for van Niekerk to get this far, each race an experiment to see how fast he could still go. The 2022 world leader was Michael Norman at 43.56. In two previous major championships, 2019 and the Olympics, Norman had failed to win, so he had something to prove here too.

Norman went out fast, but James was marginally faster through the entire first half of the race. Christopher Taylor, Matthew Hudson-Smith and van Niekerk were just a tick back. James maintained his slight edge through the turn, when they hit the straight, Norman accelerated, putting a gap on van Niekerk and Hudson-Smith, but James didn't go away. Norman battled, gaining a slight advantage, then widening it to a full meter by the finish. Two meters back, Hudson-Smith had gained the advantage over van Niekerk whose form broke down the last 25 meters. Coming from dead last off the turn, Champion Allison blazed by van Niekerk but came up short to catch Hudson-Smith for bronze.

== Records ==
Before the competition records were as follows:

Record	Athlete & Nat.	Perf.	Location	Date
World record	Wayde van Niekerk (RSA)	43.03	Rio de Janeiro, Brazil	14 August 2016
Championship record	Michael Johnson (USA)	43.18	Seville, Spain	26 August 1999
World Leading	Michael Norman (USA)	43.56	Eugene, United States	25 June 2022
African Record	Wayde van Niekerk (RSA)	43.03	Rio de Janeiro, Brazil	14 August 2016
Asian Record	Youssef Ahmed Masrahi (KSA)	43.93	Beijing, China	23 August 2015
North, Central American and Caribbean record	Michael Johnson (USA)	43.18	Seville, Spain	26 August 1999
South American Record	Anthony Zambrano (COL)	43.93	Tokyo, Japan	2 August 2021
European Record	Thomas Schönlebe (GDR)	44.33	Rome, Italy	3 September 1987
Oceanian record	Darren Clark (AUS)	44.38	Seoul, South Korea	26 September 1988

== Qualification standard ==
The standard to qualify automatically for entry was 44.90.

== Schedule ==
The event schedule, in local time (UTC−7), was as follows:

Date	Time	Round
17 July	11:05	Heats
20 July	19:15	Semi-finals
22 July	19:35	Final

== Results ==
=== Heats ===
The first 3 athletes in each heat (Q) and the next 6 fastest (q) qualify for the heats.

Rank	Heat	Name	Nationality	Time	Notes
1	5	Bayapo Ndori	Botswana	44.87	Q, PB
2	1	Wayde van Niekerk	South Africa	45.18	Q
3	5	Kirani James	Grenada	45.29	Q
4	2	Michael Norman	United States	45.37	Q
5	1	Jonathan Jones	Barbados	45.46	Q
6	6	Matthew Hudson-Smith	Great Britain & N.I.	45.49	Q
7	4	Champion Allison	United States	45.56	Q
8	5	Nathon Allen	Jamaica	45.61	Q
9	1	Alex Haydock-Wilson	Great Britain & N.I.	45.62	Q, SB
10	2	Christopher Taylor	Jamaica	45.68	Q
11	2	Zakhiti Nene	South Africa	45.69	Q
12	4	Dylan Borlée	Belgium	45.70	Q
13	2	Kevin Borlée	Belgium	45.72	q
14	3	Michael Cherry	United States	45.81	Q
15	3	Muzala Samukonga	Zambia	45.82	Q
16	6	Liemarvin Bonevacia	Netherlands	45.82	Q
17	6	Lidio Andrés Feliz	Dominican Republic	45.87	Q
18	5	Fuga Sato	Japan	45.88	q
19	1	Julian Jrummi Walsh	Japan	45.90	q
20	4	Isaac Makwala	Botswana	45.93	Q
21	5	Alex Beck	Australia	45.99	q
22	4	Mikhail Litvin	Kazakhstan	46.00	q, SB
23	6	Christopher O'Donnell	Ireland	46.01	q
24	1	Patrik Šorm	Czech Republic	46.07	
25	3	Alexander Doom	Belgium	46.18	Q
26	2	Benjamin Lobo Vedel	Denmark	46.27	
27	6	Kaito Kawabata	Japan	46.34	
28	3	Jevaughn Powell	Jamaica	46.42	
29	5	Edoardo Scotti	Italy	46.46	
30	2	Luis Avilés	Mexico	46.47	
31	4	Davide Re	Italy	46.49	
32	2	Kajetan Duszyński	Poland	46.57	
33	4	Dwight St. Hillaire	Trinidad and Tobago	46.60	
34	3	Ricky Petrucciani	Switzerland	46.60	
35	4	Boško Kijanović	Serbia	46.85	
36	1	Steven Solomon	Australia	46.87	
37	3	Anthony Pesela	Botswana	47.36	
38	6	Lucas Carvalho	Brazil	47.53	
39	5	Dexter Mayorga	Nicaragua	48.40	
40	6	Aiden Hazzard	Anguilla	51.44	SB
41	3	Obediah Timbaci	Vanuatu	53.32	

=== Semi-finals ===
The first 2 athletes in each heat (Q) and the next 2 fastest (q) qualify to the final.

Rank	Heat	Name	Nationality	Time	Notes
1	1	Michael Norman	United States	44.30	Q
2	1	Matthew Hudson-Smith	Great Britain & N.I.	44.38	Q
3	3	Champion Allison	United States	44.71	Q
4	2	Kirani James	Grenada	44.74	Q
5	3	Wayde van Niekerk	South Africa	44.75	Q
6	3	Jonathan Jones	Barbados	44.78	q
7	2	Bayapo Ndori	Botswana	44.94	Q
8	1	Christopher Taylor	Jamaica	44.97	q, SB
9	2	Muzala Samukonga	Zambia	45.02	PB
10	3	Alex Haydock-Wilson	Great Britain & N.I.	45.08	PB
11	1	Zakhiti Nene	South Africa	45.24	
12	3	Kevin Borlée	Belgium	45.26	
13	2	Michael Cherry	United States	45.28	
14	1	Dylan Borlée	Belgium	45.41	
15	3	Liemarvin Bonevacia	Netherlands	45.50	
16	3	Mikhail Litvin	Kazakhstan	45.63	PB
17	2	Fuga Sato	Japan	45.71	
18	1	Julian Jrummi Walsh	Japan	45.75	
19	2	Alexander Doom	Belgium	45.80	
20	2	Christopher O'Donnell	Ireland	46.01	
21	3	Isaac Makwala	Botswana	46.04	
22	1	Lidio Andrés Feliz	Dominican Republic	46.19	
23	1	Alex Beck	Australia	46.21	
	2	Nathon Allen	Jamaica		DNF

=== Final ===
The final took place on 22 July at 19:35.

Rank	Name	Nationality	Time	Notes
1st place, gold medalist(s)	Michael Norman	United States	44.29	
2nd place, silver medalist(s)	Kirani James	Grenada	44.48	
3rd place, bronze medalist(s)	Matthew Hudson-Smith	Great Britain & N.I.	44.66	
4	Champion Allison	United States	44.77	
5	Wayde van Niekerk	South Africa	44.97	
6	Bayapo Ndori	Botswana	45.29	
7	Christopher Taylor	Jamaica	45.30	
8	Jonathan Jones	Barbados	46.13	
