= 2022 World Athletics Championships – Women's 800 metres =

Women's 800 metres at the 2022 World Championships
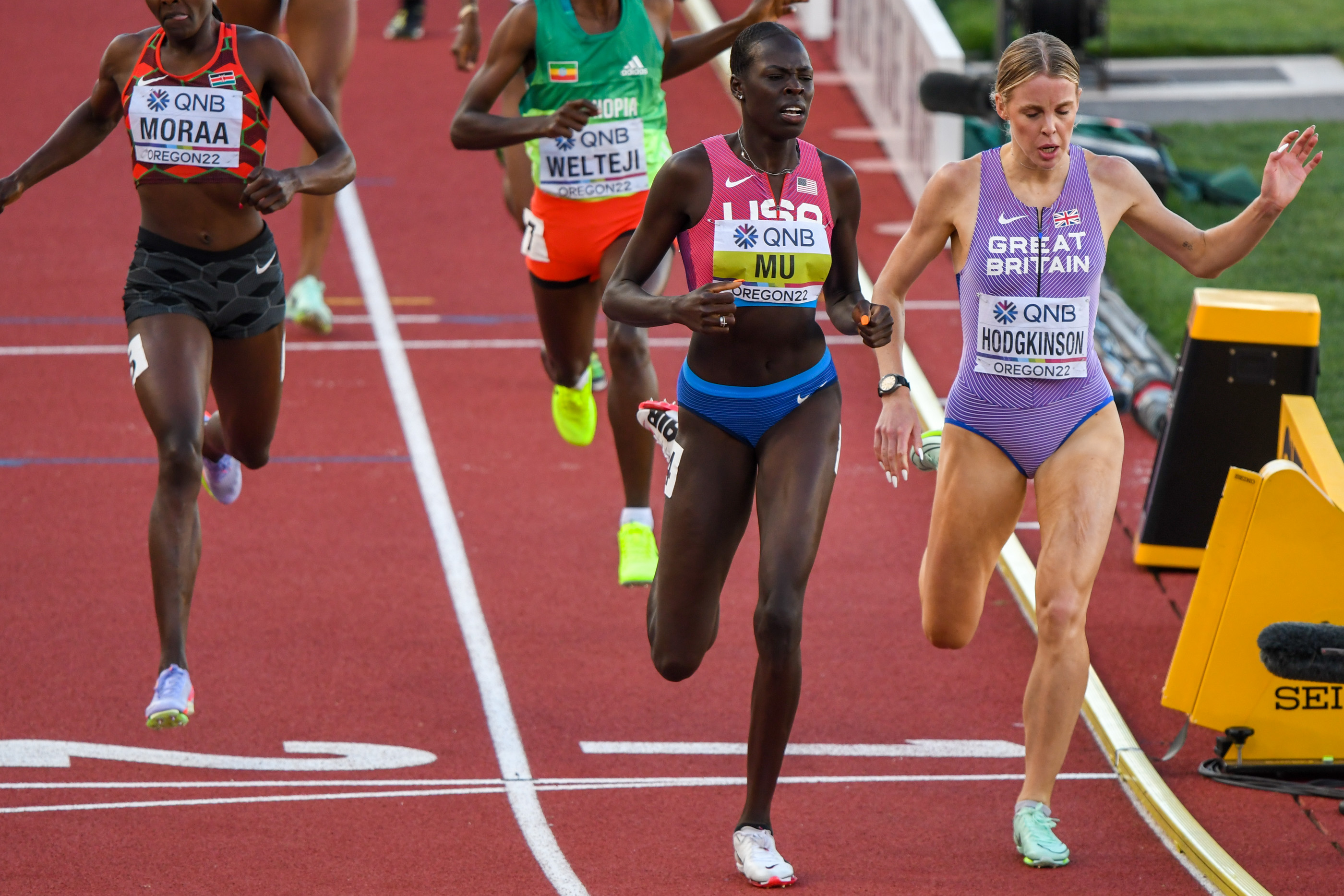
- The finish of the final.
- Venue: Hayward Field
- Dates: 21 July (heats); 22 July (semi-finals); 24 July (final)
- Competitors: 48 from 29 nations
- Winning time: 1:56.30

Medalists
gold medal	Athing Mu	United States
silver medal	Keely Hodgkinson	Great Britain
bronze medal	Mary Moraa	Kenya

Video on YouTube Official Video

The women's 800 metres at the 2022 World Athletics Championships was held at the Hayward Field in Eugene from 21 to 24 July 2022.

== Summary ==
With the elimination of defending champion Halimah Nakaayi in the semis, the rest of the podiums of the Olympics and previous World Championships were represented in the final. Olympic Champion Athing Mu, silver medalist Keely Hodgkinson, Mary Moraa and Diribe Welteji all wanted to lead, the four spread shoulder to shoulder across the track after the break line. Welteji emerged the leader, Mu on her shoulder, Hodgkinson on the rail and Moraa boxing her in on the outside. They held that formation through the bell at 57.11 and into the turn putting a 2m gap on the remaining competitors. Just before the backstretch, Mu made her move into the lead, opening up a 2 m gap before the final turn. Hodgkinson got around Welteji and went off in search of Mu, putting 2m back to Moraa and Welteji with returning silver medalist, Olympic bronze medalist Raevyn Rogers and Natoya Goule coming back to join them. With 110m to go, Mu took the turn wide and seemed to slow, enough that Hodgkinson was able to grab the inside position on Mu. The two ran shoulder to shoulder down the home stretch, with Moraa and Welteji having a similar battle 2m behind them. Bumping elbows both in lane 1, Hodgkinson gained a slight advantage, then Mu came back to get the edge. Unlike the runaway in the Olympics, Mu barely opened a gap on Hodgkinson, taking a lean at the line just to be sure. Behind them, Moraa was able to separate from Welteji for the bronze. At age 21, Moraa was the senior citizen amongst the top four, the other three still age 20.

== Records ==
Before the competition records were as follows:

Record	Athlete & Nat.	Perf.	Location	Date
World record	Jarmila Kratochvílová (TCH)	1:53.28	Munich, West Germany	26 July 1983
Championship record	Jarmila Kratochvílová (TCH)	1:54.68	Helsinki, Finland	9 August 1983
World Leading	Athing Mu (USA)	1:57.01	Rome, Italy	9 June 2022
African Record	Pamela Jelimo (KEN)	1:54.01	Zürich, Switzerland	29 August 2008
Asian Record	Liu Dong (CHN)	1:55.54	Beijing, China	9 September 1993
North, Central American and Caribbean record	Ana Fidelia Quirot (CUB)	1:54.44	Barcelona, Spain	9 September 1989
South American Record	Letitia Vriesde (SUR)	1:56.68	Gothenburg, Sweden	13 August 1995
European Record	Jarmila Kratochvílová (TCH)	1:53.28	Munich, West Germany	26 July 1983
Oceanian record	Catriona Bisset (AUS)	1:58.09	Chorzów, Poland	20 June 2021

== Qualification standard ==
The standard to qualify automatically for entry was 1:59.50.

== Schedule ==
The event schedule, in local time (UTC−7), was as follows:

Date	Time	Round
21 July	17:10	Heats
22 July	18:35	Semi-finals
24 July	18:35	Final

== Results ==
=== Heats ===
The first 3 athletes in each heat (Q) and the next 6 fastest (q) qualify to the semi-finals.

Rank	Heat	Name	Nationality	Time	Notes
1	1	Diribe Welteji	Ethiopia	1:58.83	Q
2	1	Jemma Reekie	Great Britain & N.I.	1:59.09	Q
3	1	Adelle Tracey	Jamaica	1:59.20	Q, PB
4	6	Natoya Goule	Jamaica	2:00.06	Q
5	6	Mary Moraa	Kenya	2:00.42	Q
6	4	Rénelle Lamote	France	2:00.71	Q
7	6	Anna Wielgosz	Poland	2:00.79	Q
8	1	Lindsey Butterworth	Canada	2:00.81	q
9	2	Keely Hodgkinson	Great Britain & N.I.	2:00.88	Q
10	4	Freweyni Hailu	Ethiopia	2:00.93	Q
11	4	Ajeé Wilson	United States	2:01.02	Q
12	6	Majtie Kolberg	Germany	2:01.21	q, SB
13	4	Alexandra Bell	Great Britain & N.I.	2:01.25	q
14	3	Athing Mu	United States	2:01.30	Q
15	5	Raevyn Rogers	United States	2:01.36	Q
16	5	Habitam Alemu	Ethiopia	2:01.37	Q
17	3	Halimah Nakaayi	Uganda	2:01.41	Q
18	2	Anita Horvat	Slovenia	2:01.48	Q
19	5	Noélie Yarigo	Benin	2:01.58	Q
20	5	Prudence Sekgodiso	South Africa	2:01.60	q
21	4	Naomi Korir	Kenya	2:01.61	q
22	2	Lore Hoffmann	Switzerland	2:01.63	Q
23	2	Christina Hering	Germany	2:01.63	q
24	6	Louise Shanahan	Ireland	2:01.71	
25	3	Ellie Baker	Great Britain & N.I.	2:01.72	Q
26	5	Chrisann Gordon	Jamaica	2:01.91	
27	3	Rose Mary Almanza	Cuba	2:01.96	
28	3	Olha Lyakhova	Ukraine	2:02.16	
29	2	Gayanthika Artigala	Sri Lanka	2:02.35	
30	1	Jarinter Mwasya	Kenya	2:02.35	
31	6	Jerneja Smonkar	Slovenia	2:02.48	
32	1	Eveliina Määttänen	Finland	2:02.68	
33	5	Madeleine Kelly	Canada	2:02.71	
34	2	Elena Bellò	Italy	2:02.87	qR
35	4	Shafiqua Maloney	Saint Vincent and the Grenadines	2:03.00	
36	1	Déborah Rodríguez	Uruguay	2:03.04	
37	1	Mariela Luis Real	Mexico	2:03.24	
38	6	Nozomi Tanaka	Japan	2:03.56	
39	3	Assia Raziki	Morocco	2:03.77	
40	4	Addy Townsend	Canada	2:03.79	
41	5	Vanessa Scaunet	Belgium	2:04.07	
42	5	Claudia Hollingsworth	Australia	2:04.11	
43	3	Tess Kirsopp-Cole	Australia	2:05.74	
44	6	Hedda Hynne	Norway	2:06.27	
45	2	Catriona Bisset	Australia	2:22.25	qR

=== Semi-finals ===
The first 2 athletes in each heat (Q) and the next 2 fastest (q) qualify to the final.

Rank	Heat	Name	Nationality	Time	Notes
1	3	Athing Mu	United States	1:58.12	Q
2	3	Diribe Welteji	Ethiopia	1:58.16	Q, PB
3	2	Keely Hodgkinson	Great Britain & N.I.	1:58.51	Q
4	2	Natoya Goule	Jamaica	1:58.73	Q
5	2	Raevyn Rogers	United States	1:58.77	q
6	3	Anita Horvat	Slovenia	1:59.60	q, PB
7	1	Mary Moraa	Kenya	1:59.65	Q
8	3	Lore Hoffmann	Switzerland	1:59.88	SB
9	1	Ajeé Wilson	United States	1:59.97	Q
10	3	Prudence Sekgodiso	South Africa	2:00.01	
11	2	Freweyni Hailu	Ethiopia	2:00.11	
12	1	Adelle Tracey	Jamaica	2:00.21	
13	3	Elena Bellò	Italy	2:00.34	
14	1	Habitam Alemu	Ethiopia	2:00.37	SB
15	1	Jemma Reekie	Great Britain & N.I.	2:00.43	
16	2	Anna Wielgosz	Poland	2:00.51	
17	3	Alexandra Bell	Great Britain & N.I.	2:00.82	
18	1	Rénelle Lamote	France	2:00.86	
19	3	Halimah Nakaayi	Uganda	2:01.05	
20	2	Majtie Kolberg	Germany	2:01.36	
21	1	Lindsey Butterworth	Canada	2:01.39	
22	2	Noélie Yarigo	Benin	2:01.52	
23	1	Christina Hering	Germany	2:01.57	
24	2	Ellie Baker	Great Britain & N.I.	2:02.77	
25	3	Naomi Korir	Kenya	2:03.08	
26	2	Catriona Bisset	Australia	2:05.20	

=== Final ===
The final was started on 24 July at 18:35.

Rank	Name	Nationality	Time	Notes
1st place, gold medalist(s)	Athing Mu	United States	1:56.30	WL
2nd place, silver medalist(s)	Keely Hodgkinson	Great Britain & N.I.	1:56.38	SB
3rd place, bronze medalist(s)	Mary Moraa	Kenya	1:56.71	PB
4	Diribe Welteji	Ethiopia	1:57.02	PB
5	Natoya Goule	Jamaica	1:57.90	SB
6	Raevyn Rogers	United States	1:58.26	
7	Anita Horvat	Slovenia	1:59.83	
8	Ajeé Wilson	United States	2:00.19	
