= Hillary Bor =

American track & field athlete (born 1989)

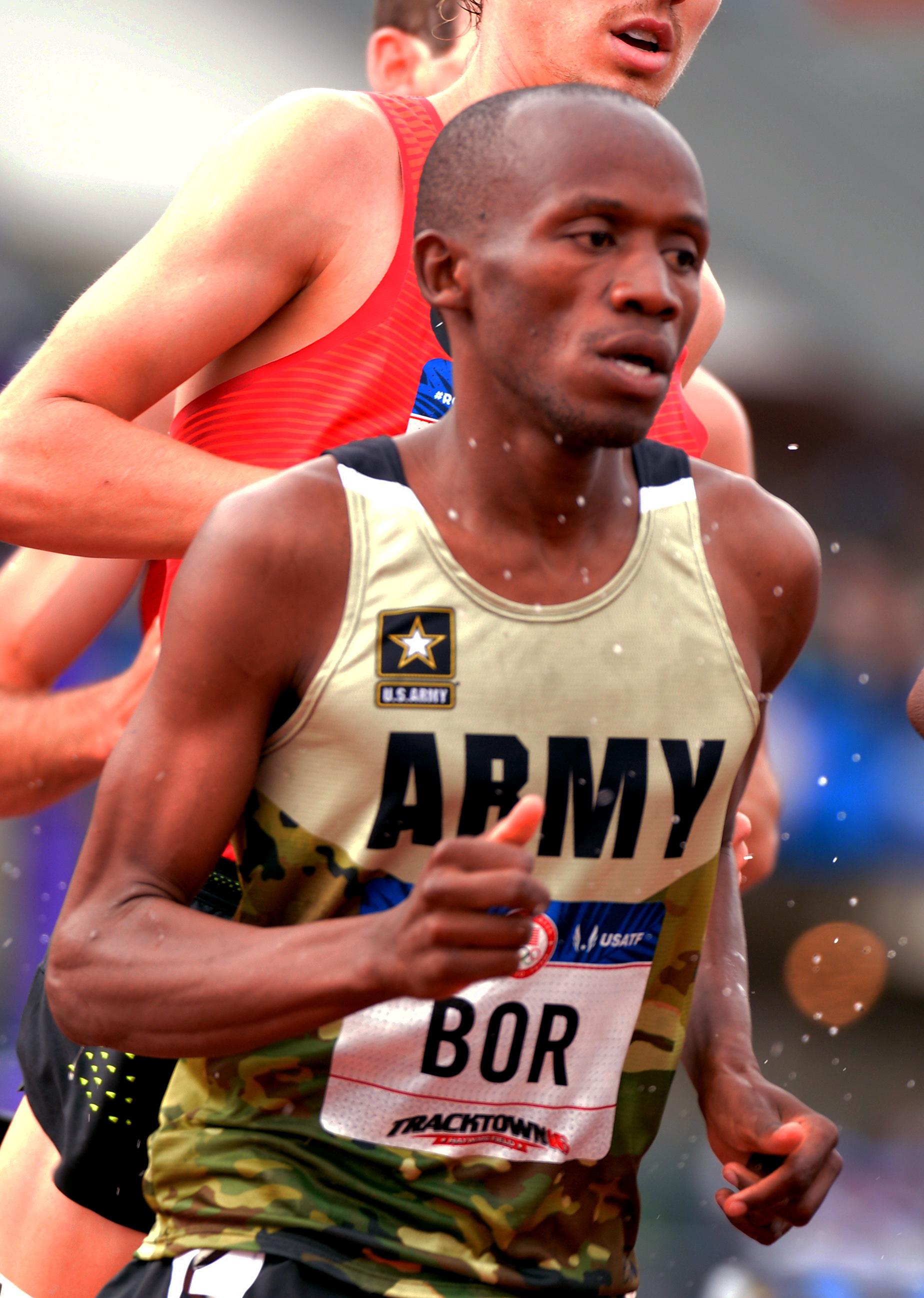
- Bor at the 2016 Olympic Trials

Personal information
- Born: November 22, 1989 (age 36) Eldoret, Kenya
- Height: 168 cm (5 ft 6 in)
- Weight: 52 kg (115 lb)

Sport
- Sport: Athletics
- Events: 3000 m steeplechase, 5000 m, 10,000m
- Club: U.S. Army WCAP

Achievements and titles
- Personal bests: 3000 m: 7:48.73i (New York City 2020); 3000 m st.: 8:08.41 (Doha 2019); 5000 m: 13:10.98 (Boston 2022); 10,000 m: 27:38.53 (San Juan Capistrano 2020); Road; 10 miles: 45:30 (Washington, D.C. 2025); Half marathon: 59:55 (New York City 2025); 15 kilometres: 42:54 (Jacksonville, Florida 2024); 20 kilometres: 58:09 (New Haven 2024)

Hillary Bor (born November 22, 1989) is a Kenyan-born American track and field athlete. He qualified for the 2016 Olympics by finishing in second place in the 3000 meters steeplechase at the 2016 United States Olympic Trials.

== Early career ==
Bor attended Arnesens High School south of Eldoret, where he ran a 9:15 steeplechase and was district champion in the long jump and pole vault. He also ran a 3:55 1500 meters in high school.

In 2007 he won a scholarship to Iowa State University, where he placed fourth in the steeplechase at the 2008 NCAA Championships in 8:36.84 earning All-American status. He improved that to second place in 2009 and added an Academic All American status to another All American improving his personal best to 8:35.12. In 2010 he finished third at the NCAAs. His senior year earned him second team Academic All American.

== Career ==
Bor's time of 8:30.70 in the steeplechase at the April 2016 Stanford Invitational was the world leading time at that point of the season. At the Olympic Trials, Bor was running in fifth place well behind Evan Jager's lead position. Another Kenyan-American, Stanley Kebenei was the closest to Jager but began to fade as Bor, Andy Bayer and Donn Cabral were chasing. The diminutive Bor made up over ten meters on the backstretch and had passed Cabral before the water jump. As he passed Bayer on the outside their two elbows made contact. On the outside, Bor was clean over the water jump and off to the races after Jager, on the inside Kebenei was unable to find his way out of the pit and fell onto all fours, causing Cabral to have to make an extra barrier jump over his body while Bayer sidestepped the fall but was losing ground chasing Bor. Bor's last lap was the fastest of the field. His time of 8:24.10 was a new personal best. After the race, the Nike Bowerman team filed a protest against Bor (the only non-Nike athlete in the final five) that was unsuccessful. This qualified him for the Olympics, where he finished 7th in the final.

In 2017, he competed in the men's 3000 metres steeplechase at the 2017 World Athletics Championships held in London, United Kingdom.

Bor ran a new personal best of 8:08.41 minutes to finish second at the 2019 Doha Diamond League. He won the 3000 m steeplechase at the 2019 US Outdoor Championships to qualify for that year's World Championships, where he finished eighth in the final.

In 2021, Bor won the US Olympic trials to qualify for the delayed 2020 Summer Olympics in the 3000 metres steeplechase, where he finished sixth in his heat and did not progress to the final.

Bor competed at the 2022 World Championships in Eugene, Oregon in the 3000 metres steeplechase, finishing eighth in the final.

In 2024, Bor broke the American Road 10 mile record with a time of 45:56 minutes at the USATF 10 Mile Championships.

== Personal life ==
His older brothers Emmanuel and Julius Bor also ran for an American college, the University of Alabama. The brothers found a path to citizenship in the country of their education by joining the United States Army. While serving on different bases, the three teamed up to win the All Armed Forces Cross Country Championships in February 2016. All three were in the top 20 of the USA Cross Country Championships, Hillary finishing eighth.
