= 2022 World Athletics Championships – Men's decathlon =

Men's decathlon at the 2022 World Championships
- Venue: Hayward Field
- Dates: 23–24 July
- Competitors: 23 from 12 nations
- Winning points: 8816

Medalists
gold medal	Kevin Mayer	France
silver medal	Pierce LePage	Canada
bronze medal	Zach Ziemek	United States

Video on YouTube Official Video

The men's decathlon at the 2022 World Athletics Championships was held at the Hayward Field in Eugene on 23 and 24 July 2022. Kevin Mayer was the winner of the competition with a score of 8816 points.

== Records ==
Before the competition records were as follows:

Record	Athlete & Nat.	Perf.	Location	Date
World record	Kevin Mayer (FRA)	9126 pts	Talence, France	16 September 2018
Championship record	Ashton Eaton (USA)	9045 pts	Beijing, China	29 August 2015
World Leading	Garrett Scantling (USA)	8867 pts	Fayetteville, United States	7 May 2022
African Record	Larbi Bourrada (ALG)	8521 pts	Rio de Janeiro, Brazil	18 August 2016
Asian Record	Dmitriy Karpov (KAZ)	8725 pts	Athens, Greece	24 August 2004
North, Central American and Caribbean record	Ashton Eaton (USA)	9045 pts	Beijing, China	29 August 2015
South American Record	Carlos Chinin (BRA)	8393 pts	São Paulo, Brazil	8 June 2013
European Record	Kevin Mayer (FRA)	9126 pts	Talence, France	16 September 2018
Oceanian record	Ashley Moloney (AUS)	8649 pts	Tokyo, Japan	5 August 2021

For the current records in each discipline see Decathlon bests.

The following records were set at the competition:

Record	Discipline	Perf.	Athlete	Nat.	Date
CDB	Discus throw	54.39m	Jiří Sýkora	CZE	24 Jul 2022

== Qualification standard ==
The standard to qualify automatically for entry was 8350 points.

== Schedule ==
The event schedule, in local time (UTC−7), was as follows:

Date	Time	Round
23 July	09:50	100 metres
23 July	10:40	Long jump
23 July	12:10	Shot put
23 July	16:10	High jump
23 July	18:55	400 metres
24 July	09:35	110 metres hurdles
24 July	10:30	Discus throw
24 July	12:15	Pole vault
24 July	17:05	Javelin throw
24 July	19:20	1500 metres

== Results ==
=== 100 metres ===
The 100 metres event was started on 23 July at 9:50.

Heat	1	2	3
Start time	09:50	09:58	10:06
Wind (m/s)	-0.2	+1.1	+0.8

Rank	Heat	Name	Nationality	Time	Points	Notes
1	3	Damian Warner	Canada	10.27	1030	
2	3	Pierce LePage	Canada	10.39	1001	
3	3	Ashley Moloney	Australia	10.49	977	SB
4	3	Ayden Owens-Delerme	Puerto Rico	10.52	970	
5	3	Zachery Ziemek	United States	10.57	959	
6	3	Kevin Mayer	France	10.62	947	SB
7	3	Kyle Garland	United States	10.69	931	
8	3	Lindon Victor	Grenada	10.78	910	
9	2	Ken Mullings	Bahamas	10.83	899	
10	1	Sander Skotheim	Norway	10.88	888	PB
11	2	Cedric Dubler	Australia	10.93	876	
12	2	Steve Bastien	United States	10.93	876	
13	2	Johannes Erm	Estonia	10.94	874	
14	1	Daniel Golubovic	Australia	10.99	863	
15	2	Leo Neugebauer	Germany	11.07	845	
16	2	Jiří Sýkora	Czech Republic	11.11	836	SB
17	2	Janek Õiglane	Estonia	11.12	834	
18	1	Maicel Uibo	Estonia	11.14	830	SB
19	2	Kai Kazmirek	Germany	11.19	819	
20	1	Niklas Kaul	Germany	11.22	812	
21	1	Tim Nowak	Germany	11.43	767	
22	1	Marcus Nilsson	Sweden	11.46	761	
	1	Andy Preciado	Ecuador	DNF	0	

=== Long jump ===
The long jump event was started on 23 July at 10:40.

Rank	Group	Name	Nationality	Round			Result	Points	Notes	Overall	
Rank	Group	Name	Nationality	1	2	3	Result	Points	Notes	Pts	Rank
1	A	Damian Warner	Canada	7.55	7.87	7.51	7.87	1027		2057	1
2	A	Zachery Ziemek	United States	7.35	7.55	7.70	7.70	985	SB	1944	3
3	A	Ayden Owens-Delerme	Puerto Rico	7.64	7.48	x	7.64	970	PB	1940	4
4	B	Cedric Dubler	Australia	7.42	7.56	x	7.56	950	SB	1826	9
5	A	Sander Skotheim	Norway	x	7.55	6.04	7.55	947		1835	8
6=	A	Kevin Mayer	France	x	7.51	7.54	7.54	945	SB	1892	6
6=	A	Pierce LePage	Canada	7.54	7.21	-	7.54	945	SB	1946	2
8	B	Kai Kazmirek	Germany	7.49	5.31	-	7.49	932		1751	14
9	A	Leo Neugebauer	Germany	6.91	7.46	7.41	7.46	925		1770	13
10	A	Ashley Moloney	Australia	7.40	7.46	7.28	7.46	925		1902	5
11	A	Steve Bastien	United States	7.10	7.41	7.23	7.41	913		1789	10
12	A	Kyle Garland	United States	7.11	7.41	x	7.41	913		1844	7
13	B	Johannes Erm	Estonia	7.19	x	7.37	7.37	903	SB	1777	12
14	B	Maicel Uibo	Estonia	7.21	7.32	6.99	7.32	891		1721	15
15	B	Janek Õiglane	Estonia	7.26	7.04	x	7.26	876	SB	1710	16
16	A	Lindon Victor	Grenada	x	7.26	x	7.26	876		1786	11
17	A	Jiří Sýkora	Czech Republic	6.82	7.14	6.68	7.14	847		1683	18
18	B	Tim Nowak	Germany	6.91	6.97	7.13	7.13	845		1612	21
19	B	Niklas Kaul	Germany	6.91	6.96	7.09	7.09	835		1647	20
20	B	Daniel Golubovic	Australia	6.96	x	x	6.96	804	SB	1667	19
20	B	Ken Mullings	Bahamas	x	x	6.96	6.96	804	SB	1703	17
22	B	Marcus Nilsson	Sweden	4.42	5.90	-	5.90	565		1326	22

=== Shot put ===
The shot put event was started on 23 July at 12:10.

Rank	Group	Name	Nationality	Round			Result	Points	Notes	Overall	
Rank	Group	Name	Nationality	1	2	3	Result	Points	Notes	Pts	Rank
1	A	Lindon Victor	Grenada	16.00	15.38	16.29	16.29	869	SB	2655	6
2	A	Leo Neugebauer	Germany	14.38	15.83	x	15.83	841		2611	9
3	A	Zachery Ziemek	United States	15.09	15.28	15.37	15.37	812	PB	2756	2
4	A	Kyle Garland	United States	15.19	15.24	x	15.24	804		2648	7
5	B	Maicel Uibo	Estonia	13.95	14.52	15.17	15.17	800	PB	2521	12
6	B	Johannes Erm	Estonia	14.74	14.90	15.01	15.01	790	PB	2567	10
7	A	Daniel Golubovic	Australia	12.97	15.00	14.36	15.00	790		2457	18
8	B	Damian Warner	Canada	14.83	14.99	x	14.99	789	SB	2846	1
9	A	Kevin Mayer	France	14.98	x	x	14.98	788		2680	5
10	A	Ayden Owens-Delerme	Puerto Rico	14.38	14.97	14.65	14.97	788		2728	3
11	A	Jiří Sýkora	Czech Republic	14.89	14.83	14.56	14.89	783		2466	17
12	B	Janek Õiglane	Estonia	14.31	14.83	14.70	14.83	779		2489	14
13	A	Pierce LePage	Canada	14.26	14.29	14.83	14.83	779		2725	4
14	B	Niklas Kaul	Germany	14.49	14.52	x	14.52	760		2407	20
15	A	Tim Nowak	Germany	14.37	14.40	14.44	14.44	755		2367	21
16	B	Kai Kazmirek	Germany	14.06	13.59	14.29	14.29	746		2497	13
17	B	Ashley Moloney	Australia	14.28	14.27	14.11	14.28	745	SB	2647	8
18	B	Ken Mullings	Bahamas	13.83	13.49	x	13.83	718		2421	19
19	B	Sander Skotheim	Norway	12.99	13.49	13.69	13.69	709		2544	11
20	B	Steve Bastien	United States	13.36	13.00	13.20	13.36	689		2478	16
21	B	Cedric Dubler	Australia	11.53	12.87	12.74	12.87	659		2485	15
	A	Marcus Nilsson	Sweden				DNS	0			

=== High jump ===
The high jump event was started on 23 July at 12:10.

Rnk	Grp	Athlete	Nationality	1.78	1.81	1.84	1.87	1.90	1.93	1.96	1.99	2.02	2.05	2.08	2.11	2.14	2.17	2.20	Res	Pts	Nts	Overall	
Rnk	Grp	Athlete	Nationality	1.78	1.81	1.84	1.87	1.90	1.93	1.96	1.99	2.02	2.05	2.08	2.11	2.14	2.17	2.20	Res	Pts	Nts	Pts	Rnk
1	A	Sander Skotheim	Norway	–	–	–	–	–	–	xo	–	o	o	o	o	o	o	xxx	2.17	963	PB	3507	7
2	A	Kyle Garland	United States	–	–	–	–	–	–	o	o	o	o	o	o	o	xxx		2.14	934		3582	3
3	A	Maicel Uibo	Estonia	–	–	–	–	–	–	–	o	o	xxo	xo	xo	xxx			2.11	906		3427	9
4	A	Zachery Ziemek	United States	–	–	–	–	–	–	–	o	–	o	o	xxx				2.08	878		3634	2
5	A	Cedric Dubler	Australia	–	–	–	–	–	–	–	o	xxo	o	xo	xxx				2.08	878		3363	12
6	B	Niklas Kaul	Germany	–	–	–	–	–	o	o	o	o	o						2.05	850	SB	3257	18
7	B	Kevin Mayer	France	–	–	–	–	–	o	–	o	xxo	o	xxx					2.05	850	SB	3530	5
7	A	Ken Mullings	Bahamas	–	–	–	–	–	–	o	xo	xo	o	xxx					2.05	850		3271	17
9	A	Tim Nowak	Germany	–	–	–	–	–	–	o	o	o	xo	xxx					2.05	850		3217	20
10	B	Janek Õiglane	Estonia	–	–	–	–	xo	–	o	o	o	xo	xxx					2.05	850	PB	3339	13
11	B	Damian Warner	Canada	–	–	–	–	–	o	xo	xo	o	xo	xxx					2.05	850	SB	3696	1
12	A	Ayden Owens-Delerme	Puerto Rico	–	–	–	o	o	o	o	xo	xo	xxx						2.02	822		3550	4
13	B	Kai Kazmirek	Germany	–	–	–	–	–	o	o	o	xxo	xxx						2.02	822		3319	14
13	A	Steve Bastien	United States	–	–	–	–	–	o	–	o	xxo	xxx						2.02	822		3300	16
15	A	Lindon Victor	Grenada	–	–	–	–	xo	o	xo	xxo	xxo	xxx						2.02	822		3477	8
16	A	Pierce LePage	Canada	–	–	–	–	–	–	xo	o	xxx							1.99	794	SB	3519	6
17	B	Leo Neugebauer	Germany	–	–	–	xo	o	xo	xxo	o	xxx							1.99	794		3405	11
18	B	Daniel Golubovic	Australia	–	–	o	o	xo	xo	o	xxx								1.96	767	SB	3224	19
19	B	Ashley Moloney	Australia	–	–	–	–	o	–	xo	xxx								1.96	767		3414	10
20	B	Jiří Sýkora	Czech Republic	–	o	o	o	xxo	xo	xxx									1.93	740		3206	21
21	B	Johannes Erm	Estonia	–	–	–	xo	xxo	xo	xxx									1.93	740		3307	15

=== 400 metres ===
The 400 metres event was started on 23 July at 18:55.

Rank	Heat	Athlete	Nationality	Result	Points	Notes	Overall	
Rank	Heat	Athlete	Nationality	Result	Points	Notes	Pts	Rank
1	3	Ayden Owens-Delerme	Puerto Rico	45.07	1056	PB	4606	1
2	3	Pierce LePage	Canada	46.84	966	PB	4485	2
3	3	Ashley Moloney	Australia	46.88	964	SB	4378	5
4	3	Johannes Erm	Estonia	47.03	957	PB	4264	11
5	3	Cedric Dubler	Australia	47.71	923		4286	10
6	3	Steve Bastien	United States	47.95	912		4212	13
7	3	Leo Neugebauer	Germany	48.34	893		4298	9
8	2	Niklas Kaul	Germany	48.39	890	SB	4147	16
9	1	Janek Õiglane	Estonia	49.16	854	SB	4193	14
10	1	Ken Mullings	Bahamas	49.25	849	SB	4120	17
11	2	Lindon Victor	Grenada	49.27	849		4326	8
12	2	Jiří Sýkora	Czech Republic	49.29	848		4054	19
13	2	Kai Kazmirek	Germany	49.33	846		4165	15
14	2	Kevin Mayer	France	49.40	842	SB	4372	6
15	2	Daniel Golubovic	Australia	49.44	841	SB	4065	18
16	1	Zachery Ziemek	United States	49.56	835	SB	4469	3
17	2	Kyle Garland	United States	49.64	831		4413	4
18	2	Sander Skotheim	Norway	49.80	824		4331	7
19	1	Maicel Uibo	Estonia	50.38	797	SB	4224	12
20	1	Tim Nowak	Germany	50.94	772		3989	20
	3	Damian Warner	Canada	DNF	0		DNF	

=== 110 metres hurdles ===
The 110 metres hurdles event was started on 24 July at 09:35.

Rank	Heat	Athlete	Nationality	Result	Points	Notes	Overall	
Rank	Heat	Athlete	Nationality	Result	Points	Notes	Pts	Rank
1	3	Pierce LePage	Canada	13.78	1003	PB	5488	2
2	3	Ayden Owens-Delerme	Puerto Rico	13.88	990		5596	1
3=	3	Daniel Golubovic	Australia	13.92	985	PB	5050	18
3=	3	Kevin Mayer	France	13.92	985	SB	5357	5
5	2	Ken Mullings	Bahamas	14.02	972	PB	5092	14
6	2	Jiří Sýkora	Czech Republic	14.14	957	SB	5011	19
7	3	Kyle Garland	United States	14.18	951		5364	4
8	2	Niklas Kaul	Germany	14.27	940	PB	5087	15
9	3	Cedric Dubler	Australia	14.28	939		5225	7
10	1	Johannes Erm	Estonia	14.38	926	SB	5190	9
11	2	Kai Kazmirek	Germany	14.43	920		5085	16
12	2	Ashley Moloney	Australia	14.46	916	SB	5294	6
13	1	Zachery Ziemek	United States	14.47	915	SB	5384	3
14	1	Maicel Uibo	Estonia	14.49	912	SB	5136	12
15	2	Janek Õiglane	Estonia	14.69	887		5080	17
16	2	Steve Bastien	United States	14.75	880		5092	13
17	1	Lindon Victor	Grenada	14.76	879		5205	8
18	1	Leo Neugebauer	Germany	14.86	867		5165	11
19	1	Tim Nowak	Germany	14.91	797		4224	20
20	1	Sander Skotheim	Norway	15.05	843		5174	10

=== Discus throw ===
The discus throw event was started on 24 July at 10:30.

Rank	Group	Name	Nationality	Round			Result	Points	Notes	Overall	
Rank	Group	Name	Nationality	1	2	3	Result	Points	Notes	Pts	Rank
1	A	Jiří Sýkora	Czech Republic	51.01	53.67	54.39	54.39	962	CDB	5973	9
2	B	Lindon Victor	Grenada	44.70	49.32	53.92	53.92	952		6157	5
3	B	Pierce LePage	Canada	53.26	x	x	53.26	939	PB	6427	1
4	B	Leo Neugebauer	Germany	51.63	51.88	x	51.88	910		6075	7
5	A	Kevin Mayer	France	49.44	x	48.44	49.44	859	SB	6216	4
6	A	Zachery Ziemek	United States	45.47	45.30	48.40	48.40	837		6221	3
7	A	Maicel Uibo	Estonia	46.52	x	44.66	46.52	798		5934	12
8	B	Daniel Golubovic	Australia	46.37	45.87	45.28	46.37	795		5845	15
9	B	Kyle Garland	United States	x	45.44	x	45.44	776		6140	6
10	B	Niklas Kaul	Germany	40.73	44.62	x	44.62	759		5846	14
11	B	Johannes Erm	Estonia	40.78	44.18	x	44.18	750		5940	11
12	B	Sander Skotheim	Norway	40.83	x	42.89	42.89	724		5898	13
13	A	Cedric Dubler	Australia	41.09	40.32	42.88	42.88	723		5948	10
14	B	Ken Mullings	Bahamas	x	40.73	42.70	42.70	720		5812	16
15	A	Ashley Moloney	Australia	x	x	42.45	42.45	715	SB	6009	8
16	B	Ayden Owens-Delerme	Puerto Rico	42.36	38.70	x	42.36	713		6309	2
17	A	Tim Nowak	Germany	42.13	x	x	42.13	708		5557	19
18	A	Kai Kazmirek	Germany	40.72	40.54	40.96	40.96	684		5769	18
19	B	Steve Bastien	United States	38.46	x	40.66	40.66	678	SB	5770	17
20	A	Janek Õiglane	Estonia	x	30.49	29.67	30.49	474		5554	20

=== Pole vault ===
The pole vault event started on 24 July at 17:05.

Rnk	Grp	Athlete	Nationality	4.00	4.10	4.20	4.30	4.40	4.50	4.60	4.70	4.80	4.90	5.00	5.10	5.20	5.30	5.40	5.50	Res	Pts	Nts	Overall	
Rnk	Grp	Athlete	Nationality	4.00	4.10	4.20	4.30	4.40	4.50	4.60	4.70	4.80	4.90	5.00	5.10	5.20	5.30	5.40	5.50	Res	Pts	Nts	Pts	Rnk
1	A	Kevin Mayer	France	–	–	–	–	–	–	–	–	–	–	xxo	xo	xo	o	xo	xxx	5.40	1035	SB	7251	3
2	A	Zachery Ziemek	United States	–	–	–	–	–	–	–	–	–	–	o	o	o	–	xxo	xxx	5.40	1035	SB	7256	2
3	A	Maicel Uibo	Estonia	–	–	–	–	–	–	–	–	–	–	xxo	xxo	o	o	xxx		5.30	1004		6938	6
4	A	Cedric Dubler	Australia	–	–	–	–	–	–	o	–	o	o	o	o	xxx				5.10	941	SB	6889	9
5	B	Pierce LePage	Canada	–	–	–	–	–	–	–	xo	–	o	o	xxx					5.00	910	SB	7337	1
6	A	Kai Kazmirek	Germany	–	–	–	–	–	–	–	o	–	o	xxo	xxx					5.00	910	SB	6679	14
7	B	Niklas Kaul	Germany	–	–	–	–	–	–	–	xxo	o	xxx							4.80	849		6695	13
8	B	Leo Neugebauer	Germany	–	–	–	–	o	xo	o	o	xo	xxx							4.80	849		6924	8
9	B	Lindon Victor	Grenada	–	–	–	–	xo	o	o	xxo	xo	xxx							4.80	849	SB	7006	5
10	B	Johannes Erm	Estonia	–	–	–	–	–	–	xo	o	xxx								4.70	819		6759	11
11	B	Sander Skotheim	Norway	–	–	–	–	o	–	o	xo	xxx								4.70	819		6717	12
12	B	Steve Bastien	United States	–	–	–	–	xo	xo	o	xo	xxx								4.70	819		6589	16
13	B	Daniel Golubovic	Australia	–	–	–	–	xxo	–	o	–	xxx								4.60	790		6635	15
14	A	Jiří Sýkora	Czech Republic	–	xxo	–	r													4.60	790		6763	10
15	B	Kyle Garland	United States	–	–	–	xo	o	o	xxo	xxx									4.60	790		6930	7
16	B	Ayden Owens-Delerme	Puerto Rico	–	–	–	–	–	o	xxx										4.50	760		7069	4
17	B	Ken Mullings	Bahamas	–	o	o	xo	xo	o	xxx										4.50	760		6572	17
18	A	Tim Nowak	Germany	–	–	xxx														NM	0		5557	18

=== Javelin throw ===
The javelin throw event started on 24 July at 17:05.

Rank	Group	Name	Nationality	Round			Result	Points	Notes	Overall	
Rank	Group	Name	Nationality	1	2	3	Result	Points	Notes	Pts	Rank
1	A	Kevin Mayer	France	64.01	70.31	68.73	70.31	894	SB	8145	1
2	B	Niklas Kaul	Germany	67.33	67.93	69.74	69.74	885	SB	7580	7
3	B	Lindon Victor	Grenada	59.59	65.52	66.20	66.20	832	SB	7838	4
4	A	Maicel Uibo	Estonia	62.11	60.45	63.54	63.54	791		7729	5
5	A	Kai Kazmirek	Germany	62.52	60.50	59.37	60.50	776		7455	12
6	A	Zachery Ziemek	United States	58.22	61.19	62.18	62.18	771	PB	8027	3
7	A	Jiří Sýkora	Czech Republic	x	61.49	x	61.49	760	SB	7523	11
8	B	Pierce LePage	Canada	48.95	57.52	56.63	57.52	701	SB	8038	2
9	A	Ken Mullings	Bahamas	56.92	53.78	54.59	56.92	692	SB	7264	17
10	B	Johannes Erm	Estonia	50.70	56.87	49.65	56.87	691		7450	13
11	B	Daniel Golubovic	Australia	54.33	56.75	55.45	56.75	689	SB	7324	15
12	A	Tim Nowak	Germany	50.31	46.70	56.52	56.52	686		6243	18
13	B	Steve Bastien	United States	53.49	54.46	55.80	55.80	675	SB	7264	16
14	B	Sander Skotheim	Norway	50.25	54.16	55.47	55.47	670		7387	14
15	A	Cedric Dubler	Australia	54.76	53.34	49.73	54.76	659		7548	10
16	B	Kyle Garland	United States	48.51	53.23	x	53.23	637		7567	8
17	B	Leo Neugebauer	Germany	41.73	52.80	x	52.80	630		7554	9
18	A	Ayden Owens-Delerme	Puerto Rico	50.98	46.24	49.58	50.98	603		7672	6

=== 1500 metres ===
The 1500 metres event started on 24 July at 19:20.

Rank	Athlete	Nationality	Result	Points	Notes	Overall	
Rank	Athlete	Nationality	Result	Points	Notes	Pts	Rank
1	Ayden Owens-Delerme	Puerto Rico	4:13.02	860	PB	8532	4
2	Niklas Kaul	Germany	4:13.81	854	PB	8434	6
3	Johannes Erm	Estonia	4:25.08	777	PB	8227	9
4	Tim Nowak	Germany	4:26.87	765		7008	18
5	Daniel Golubovic	Australia	4:29.67	747	SB	8071	14
6	Cedric Dubler	Australia	4:37.26	698	SB	8246	8
7	Maicel Uibo	Estonia	4:37.58	696		8425	7
8	Sander Skotheim	Norway	4:40.84	675		8062	15
9	Steve Bastien	United States	4:40.92	675		7939	16
10	Kevin Mayer	France	4:41.44	671	SB	8816	1
11	Pierce LePage	Canada	4:42.77	663	SB	8701	2
12	Kai Kazmirek	Germany	4:43.51	658		8113	12
13	Zachery Ziemek	United States	4:44.97	649		8676	3
14	Lindon Victor	Grenada	4:47.22	636	SB	8474	5
15	Leo Neugebauer	Germany	4:48.41	628		8182	10
16	Ken Mullings	Bahamas	4:52.85	602	SB	7866	17
17	Jiří Sýkora	Czech Republic	4:55.90	584	SB	8107	13
18	Kyle Garland	United States	4:58.94	566		8133	11

=== Final standings ===
The final standings were as follows:

The highest mark recorded in each event is highlighted in yellow

Rank	Athlete	Nationality	100m	LJ	SP	HJ	400m	110mh	DT	PV	JT	1500m	Total	Notes
1st place, gold medalist(s)	Kevin Mayer	France	10.62	7.54	14.98	2.05	49.40	13.92	49.44	5.40	70.31	4:41.44	8816	SB
2nd place, silver medalist(s)	Pierce LePage	Canada	10.39	7.54	14.83	1.99	46.84	13.78	53.26	5.00	57.52	4:42.77	8701	PB
3rd place, bronze medalist(s)	Zachery Ziemek	United States	10.57	7.70	15.37	2.08	49.56	14.47	48.40	5.40	62.18	4:44.97	8676	PB
4	Ayden Owens-Delerme	Puerto Rico	10.52	7.64	14.97	2.02	45.07	13.88	42.36	4.50	50.98	4:13.02	8532	NR
5	Lindon Victor	Grenada	10.78	7.26	16.29	2.02	49.27	14.76	53.92	4.80	66.20	4:47.22	8474	SB
6	Niklas Kaul	Germany	11.22	7.09	14.52	2.05	48.39	14.27	44.62	4.80	69.74	4:13.81	8434	SB
7	Maicel Uibo	Estonia	11.14	7.32	15.17	2.11	50.38	14.49	46.52	5.30	63.54	4:37.58	8425	SB
8	Cedric Dubler	Australia	10.93	7.56	12.87	2.08	47.71	14.28	42.88	5.10	54.76	4:37.26	8246	SB
9	Johannes Erm	Estonia	10.94	7.37	15.01	1.93	47.02	14.38	44.18	4.70	56.87	4:25.08	8227	
10	Leo Neugebauer	Germany	11.07	7.46	15.83	1.99	48.34	14.86	51.88	4.80	52.80	4:48.41	8182	
11	Kyle Garland	United States	10.69	7.41	15.24	2.14	49.64	14.18	45.44	4.60	53.23	4:58.94	8133	
12	Kai Kazmirek	Germany	11.19	7.49	14.29	2.02	49.33	14.43	40.96	5.00	62.52	4:43.51	8113	SB
13	Jiří Sýkora	Czech Republic	11.11	7.14	14.89	1.93	49.29	14.14	54.39	4.60	61.49	4:55.90	8107	SB
14	Daniel Golubovic	Australia	10.99	6.96	15.00	1.96	49.44	13.92	46.37	4.60	56.75	4:29.67	8071	SB
15	Sander Skotheim	Norway	10.88	7.55	13.69	2.17	49.80	15.05	42.89	4.70	55.47	4:40.84	8062	
16	Steve Bastien	United States	10.93	7.41	13.36	2.02	47.95	14.75	40.66	4.70	55.80	4:40.92	7939	
17	Ken Mullings	Bahamas	10.83	6.96	13.83	2.05	49.25	14.02	42.70	4.50	56.92	4:52.85	7866	NR
18	Tim Nowak	Germany	11.43	7.13	14.44	2.05	50.94	14.91	42.13	NM	56.52	4:26.87	7008	
	Ashley Moloney	Australia	10.49	7.46	14.28	1.96	46.88	14.46	42.45	DNS	–	–	DNF	
	Janek Õiglane	Estonia	11.12	7.26	14.83	2.05	49.16	14.69	30.49	DNS	–	–	DNF	
	Damian Warner	Canada	10.27	7.87	14.99	2.05	DNF	–	–	–	–	–	DNF	
	Marcus Nilsson	Sweden	11.46	5.90	DNS	–	–	–	–	–	–	–	DNF	
	Andy Preciado	Ecuador	DNF	–	–	–	–	–	–	–	–	–	DNF	
