= 2022 World Athletics Championships – Men's 400 metres hurdles =

Men's 400 metres hurdles at the 2022 World Championships
- Venue: Hayward Field
- Dates: 16 July (heats); 17 July (semi-finals); 19 July (final)
- Competitors: 40 from 30 nations

Medalists
gold medal	Alison dos Santos	Brazil
silver medal	Rai Benjamin	United States
bronze medal	Trevor Bassitt	United States

The men's 400 metres hurdles at the 2022 World Athletics Championships was held at the Hayward Field in Eugene from 16 to 19 July 2022.

== Summary ==
The podium from the Olympics, the three fastest athletes of all time, all managed to return to the final, but it was a difficult journey. Olympic Champion/World Record Holder Karsten Warholm pulled up one hurdle into his first race of the season in Rabat and had been on the mend since. With zero races completed during the season, every race was a season's best. Silver medalist Rai Benjamin also was nursing injuries but ran well at the American Championships, while bronze medalist Alison dos Santos was scorching the tracks of the Diamond League setting a world leading time of 46.80 in Stockholm, a time only bettered in Olympic finals by Kevin Young, Warholm and Benjamin.

Benjamin had lane 3, where he could see all his key competitors; Warholm in 4 and Dos Santos in 6, blind to what his key challengers were doing, having to run by his own clock. Warholm was out fast from the gun, making up the stagger on Wilfried Happio by the third hurdle. dos Santos was clearing hurdles just a beat after him. By the sixth hurdle, Warholm had a full stride on dos Santos. Around the event hurdle, Benjamin started rolling, reeling in the gap Warholm had put on him. Warholm could see he wouldn't make his steps to the eighth hurdle and chopped, taking two extra shortened strides to take the hurdle smoothly. He still had the lead but his momentum was lost, his rivals closing. From the first step off that hurdle Warholm's form deteriorated. dos Santos and then in an instant, Benjamin were past him. The chase was on for Benjamin, but he couldn't close on dos Santos. Coming from sixth place over the final hurdle, Trevor Bassitt passed Warholm, Jaheel Hyde and finally Harpio to capture bronze.

dos Santos improved his position as the No. 3 athlete of all time with a Championship Record 46.29. Benjamin's 46.89 was only his third best effort but was the tenth fastest race ever. Bassitt 47.39 and Harpio 47.41 became the No. 18 and No. 19 athletes of all time.

== Records ==
Before the competition records were as follows:

Record	Athlete & Nat.	Perf.	Location	Date
World record	Karsten Warholm (NOR)	45.94	Tokyo, Japan	3 August 2021
Championship record	Kevin Young (USA)	47.18	Stuttgart, Germany	19 August 1993
World Leading	Alison dos Santos (BRA)	46.80	Stockholm, Sweden	30 June 2022
African Record	Samuel Matete (ZAM)	47.10	Zürich, Switzerland	7 August 1991
Asian Record	Abderrahman Samba (QAT)	46.98	Paris, France	30 June 2018
North, Central American and Caribbean record	Rai Benjamin (USA)	46.17	Tokyo, Japan	3 August 2021
South American Record	Alison dos Santos (BRA)	46.72	Tokyo, Japan	3 August 2021
European Record	Karsten Warholm (NOR)	45.94	Tokyo, Japan	3 August 2021
Oceanian record	Rohan Robinson (AUS)	48.28	Atlanta, United States	31 July 1996

The following records were set at the competition:

Record	Perf.	Athlete	Nat.	Date
Championship record	46.29	Alison dos Santos	BRA	19 Jul 2022
World Leading	46.29	Alison dos Santos	BRA	19 Jul 2022
South American Record	46.29	Alison dos Santos	BRA	19 Jul 2022

== Qualification standard ==
The standard to qualify automatically for entry was 48.90.

== Schedule ==
The event schedule, in local time (UTC−7), was as follows:

Date	Time	Round
16 July	13:20	Heats
17 July	18:03	Semi-finals
19 July	19:50	Final

== Results ==
=== Heats ===
The first 4 athletes in each heat (Q) and the next 4 fastest (q) qualify to the semi-finals.

Rank	Heat	Name	Nationality	Time	Notes
1	5	Khallifah Rosser	United States	48.62	Q
2	4	Rasmus Mägi	Estonia	48.78	Q
3	1	Rai Benjamin	United States	49.06	Q
4	4	Thomas Barr	Ireland	49.15	Q, SB
5	4	Gerald Drummond	Costa Rica	49.16	Q
6	4	Trevor Bassitt	United States	49.17	Q
7	3	Karsten Warholm	Norway	49.34	Q, SB
8	4	Alastair Chalmers	Great Britain & N.I.	49.37	q
9	2	Alison dos Santos	Brazil	49.41	Q
10	2	Kemar Mowatt	Jamaica	49.44	Q
11	4	Shawn Rowe	Jamaica	49.51	q
12	1	Abdelmalik Lahoulou	Algeria	49.58	Q
13	2	Wilfried Happio	France	49.60	Q
14	5	Ramsey Angela	Netherlands	49.62	Q
15	5	Carl Bengtström	Sweden	49.64	Q
15	1	Ezekiel Nathaniel	Nigeria	49.64	Q
17	2	Nick Smidt	Netherlands	49.80	Q
18	3	Julien Watrin	Belgium	49.83	Q
19	4	Yasmani Copello	Turkey	49.83	q
20	5	Kyron McMaster	British Virgin Islands	49.98	Q
21	1	Kazuki Kurokawa	Japan	50.02	Q
22	3	Jaheel Hyde	Jamaica	50.03	Q
23	2	Sokwakhana Zazini	South Africa	50.09	q
24	5	Mario Lambrughi	Italy	50.18	
25	5	Pablo Andrés Ibáñez	El Salvador	50.18	
26	3	Moitalel Naadokila	Kenya	50.19	Q
27	1	Chen Chieh	Chinese Taipei	50.28	
28	3	Julien Bonvin	Switzerland	50.40	
29	2	Takayuki Kishimoto	Japan	50.66	
30	5	Vít Müller	Czech Republic	50.71	
31	2	Jabir Madari Palliyalil	India	50.76	
32	1	Chris McAlister	Great Britain & N.I.	51.55	
33	4	Mahau Suguimati	Brazil	52.43	
34	3	Ned Azemia	Seychelles	53.07	
35	3	Juander Santos	Dominican Republic	58.80	
	1	Jordin Andrade	Cape Verde	DNF	
	1	Dany Brand	Switzerland	DNS	

=== Semi-finals ===
The semifinals started on 17 July at 18:03.

Rank	Heat	Name	Nationality	Time	Notes
1	2	Alison dos Santos	Brazil	47.85	Q
2	3	Karsten Warholm	Norway	48.00	Q, SB
3	3	Wilfried Happio	France	48.14	Q, PB
4	2	Trevor Bassitt	United States	48.17	Q
5	3	Khallifah Rosser	United States	48.34	q
6	2	Rasmus Mägi	Estonia	48.40	q
7	1	Rai Benjamin	United States	48.44	Q
8	3	Kemar Mowatt	Jamaica	48.59	
9	2	Carl Bengtström	Sweden	48.75	
10	2	Abdelmalik Lahoulou	Algeria	48.90	
11	1	Jaheel Hyde	Jamaica	49.09	Q
12	2	Moitalel Naadokila	Kenya	49.34	
13	2	Gerald Drummond	Costa Rica	49.37	
14	1	Julien Watrin	Belgium	49.52	
15	3	Nick Smidt	Netherlands	49.56	
16	3	Kazuki Kurokawa	Japan	49.69	
17	1	Ramsey Angela	Netherlands	49.77	
18	2	Shawn Rowe	Jamaica	49.80	
19	1	Thomas Barr	Ireland	50.08	
20	3	Sokwakhana Zazini	South Africa	50.22	
21	1	Alastair Chalmers	Great Britain & N.I.	50.54	
22	1	Yasmani Copello	Turkey	51.49	
23	3	Ezekiel Nathaniel	Nigeria	54.18	
	1	Kyron McMaster	British Virgin Islands	DNS	

=== Final ===
The final will start on 19 July at 19:50.

Rank	Name	Nationality	Time	Notes
1st place, gold medalist(s)	Alison dos Santos	Brazil	46.29	AR, CR
2nd place, silver medalist(s)	Rai Benjamin	United States	46.89	SB
3rd place, bronze medalist(s)	Trevor Bassitt	United States	47.39	PB
4	Wilfried Happio	France	47.41	PB
5	Khallifah Rosser	United States	47.88	
6	Jaheel Hyde	Jamaica	48.03	PB
7	Karsten Warholm	Norway	48.42	
8	Rasmus Mägi	Estonia	48.92	
