= 2022 World Athletics Championships – Men's 20 kilometres walk =

Men's 20 kilometres walk at the 2022 World Championships
- Venue: Hayward Field
- Dates: 15 July
- Competitors: 48 from 26 nations
- Winning time: 1:19:07

Medalists
gold medal	Toshikazu Yamanishi	Japan
silver medal	Koki Ikeda	Japan
bronze medal	Perseus Karlström	Sweden

Video on YouTube Official Video

The men's 20 kilometres walk at the 2022 World Athletics Championships was held on a 1 kilometer loop course on Martin Luther King Jr. Blvd. adjacent to Autzen Stadium in Eugene on 15 July 2022.

== Summary ==
David Kenny broke from the start to take the early lead. After a couple hundred metres in the spotlight, Toshikazu Yamanishi went by en route to a 3:55 first kilometer. With a 4 second lead, Yamanishi saw nobody was willing to go with him. He remained in the lead for three laps before easing off the accelerator. Perseus Karlström was next to take the point with a pack of 22 staying close together. On the eighth lap, César Rodríguez asserted himself into the lead, then Yamanishi took over. Just after the halfway mark, Yamanishi dropped a 3:51 lap and continued the pressure, the pack dwindled to 9, then 7 as the third 5K was covered in 19:24. Karlström again pushed to the front but couldn't hold the lead, falling off the pace. With four laps to go, it was down to three leaders, Yamanishi, his encouraging teammate Koki Ikeda and Kenyan Samuel Gathimba. With two to go, Ikeda edged ahead but that was temporary. Yamanishi edged back ahead, the on his final lap dropped a 3:41 to separate from his teammate Ikeda. With his final lap, Karlström matched the 3:41 to come back and pass Gathimba for the bronze.

== Records ==
Before the competition records were as follows:

Record	Athlete & Nat.	Perf.	Location	Date
World record	Yusuke Suzuki (JPN)	1:16:36	Nomi, Japan	15 March 2015
Championship record	Jefferson Pérez (ECU)	1:17:21	Saint-Denis, France	23 August 2003
World Leading	Vasiliy Mizinov (ANA)	1:17:47	Sochi, Russia	31 January 2022
African Record	Samuel Gathimba (KEN)	1:18:23	Nairobi, Kenya	18 June 2021
Asian Record	Yusuke Suzuki (JPN)	1:16:36	Nomi, Japan	15 March 2015
North, Central American and Caribbean record	Julio Martínez (GUA)	1:17:46	Eisenhüttenstadt, Germany	8 May 1999
South American Record	Jefferson Pérez (ECU)	1:17:21	Saint-Denis, France	23 August 2003
European Record	Yohann Diniz (FRA)	1:17:02	Arles, France	8 March 2015
Oceanian record	Nathan Deakes (AUS)	1:17:33	Cixi, China	23 April 2005

== Qualification standard ==
The standard to qualify automatically for entry was 1:21:00.

== Schedule ==
The event schedule, in local time (UTC−7), was as follows:

Date	Time	Round
15 July	15:10	Final

== Results ==
The race was started on 15 July at 15:09.

Rank	Name	Nationality	Time	Notes
1st place, gold medalist(s)	Toshikazu Yamanishi	Japan	1:19:07	SB
2nd place, silver medalist(s)	Koki Ikeda	Japan	1:19:14	
3rd place, bronze medalist(s)	Perseus Karlström	Sweden	1:19:18	SB
4	Samuel Gathimba	Kenya	1:19:25	SB
5	Brian Pintado	Ecuador	1:19:34	PB
6	Caio Bonfim	Brazil	1:19.51	
7	Álvaro Martín	Spain	1:20:19	
8	Hiroto Jusho	Japan	1:20:39	
9	Alberto Amezcua	Spain	1:20:44	
10	César Rodríguez	Peru	1:20:59	
11	David Hurtado	Ecuador	1:21:11	
12	Wayne Snyman	South Africa	1:21:23	
13	Wang Kaihua	China	1:21:41	SB
14	Cui Lihong	China	1:22:17	
15	Francesco Fortunato	Italy	1:22:50	
16	Diego García	Spain	1:23:21	
17	Declan Tingay	Australia	1:23:28	
18	Andrés Olivas	Mexico	1:23:26	
19	Rhydian Cowley	Australia	1:23:37	
20	Aleksi Ojala	Finland	1:23:40	
21	José Ortiz	Guatemala	1:23:48	
22	Éider Arévalo	Colombia	1:24:32	
23	Jordy Jiménez	Ecuador	1:24:35	
24	Zhang Jun	China	1:24:35	
25	Julio César Salazar	Mexico	1:25:16	
26	Miroslav Úradník	Slovakia	1:25:40	
27	José Oswaldo Calel	Guatemala	1:26:24	
28	Georgiy Sheiko	Kazakhstan	1:26:40	
29	Eiki Takahashi	Japan	1:26:46	
30	Matheus Corrêa	Brazil	1:27:31	
31	Nick Christie	United States	1:28:28	
32	Gianluca Picchiottino	Italy	1:28:33	
33	Kyle Swan	Australia	1:28:43	
34	Choe Byeong-kwang	South Korea	1:28:56	
35	Quentin Rew	New Zealand	1:29:19	
36	Lucas Mazzo	Brazil	1:29:32	
37	Dominik Černý	Slovakia	1:29:41	
38	Juan Manuel Cano	Argentina	1:29:47	
39	David Kenny	Ireland	1:31:23	
40	Sandeep Kumar	India	1:31:58	
41	Luis Henry Campos	Peru	1:34:02	
42	Jesús Calderón	Mexico	1:35:43	
43	Dan Nehnevaj	United States	1:43:07	
	Christopher Linke	Germany	DNF	
	José Alejandro Barrondo	Guatemala	DQ	
