= Switzerland at the 2022 World Athletics Championships =

- Flag of Switzerland
- WA code: SUI
- National federation: Swiss Athletics Federation
- Website: www.swiss-athletics.ch

in Eugene, United States 15–24 July 2022
- Competitors: 26 (8 men and 18 women) in 17 events
- Medals Ranked 40th: Gold 0 Silver 0 Bronze 1 Total 1

World Athletics Championships appearances
- 1976; 1980; 1983; 1987; 1991; 1993; 1995; 1997; 1999; 2001; 2003; 2005; 2007; 2009; 2011; 2013; 2015; 2017; 2019; 2022; 2023; 2025

Switzerland competed at the 2022 World Athletics Championships in Eugene, United States, from 15 to 24 July 2022. The Swiss Athletics Federation entered 26 athletes.

With 1 bronze medal, Switzerland ended 40th in the medal table, but ranked 25th in the overall placing table with a total of 18 points.

== Medalists ==
Medal	Athlete	Event	Date
Bronze	Simon Ehammer	Men's Long jump	16 July

== Team ==
On 29 June 2022, the Swiss Athletics Federation announced a 26-member team qualified for the World Athletics Championships, which included the heptathlete Caroline Agnou who was later ruled out due to injury, reducing the Swiss team to 25 athletes. The final entry list published by World Athletics consigned 26 athletes for Switzerland, with Rachel Pellaud being added to the women's 4 × 400 metres relay team. Eventually, Pellaud was not part of the Swiss team that was made up of 25 athletes.

Sprinter Natacha Kouni was included in the team for the women's 4 × 100 metres relay, but finally she had no participation. In the same way, Sarah King was part of the women's 4 × 400 metres relay team, but had no participation.

== Results ==
Switzerland entered 26 athletes, but only 23 of them participated.

Key

- Note: Ranks given for track events are within the athlete's heat only
- Q = Qualified for the next round
- q = Qualified for the next round as a fastest loser or, in field events, by position without achieving the qualifying target
- NR = National record
- PB = Personal best
- SB = Season best
- N/A = Round not applicable for the event

=== Men ===
Track events

Athlete	Event	Heat		Semi-final		Final	
Athlete	Event	Result	Rank	Result	Rank	Result	Rank
William Reais	200 metres	20.71 (+0.4) SB	5	Did not advance			
Ricky Petrucciani	400 metres	46.60	5	Did not advance			
Jason Joseph	110 metres hurdles	13.49 (−0.5)	4 Q	13.67 (−0.6)	7	Did not advance	
Julien Bonvin	400 metres hurdles	50.40	5	Did not advance			
Dany Brand	400 metres hurdles	DNS		Did not advance			

Field events

Athlete	Event	Qualification		Final	
Athlete	Event	Distance	Position	Distance	Position
Loïc Gasch	High jump	2.21	22	Did not advance	
Simon Ehammer	Long jump	8.09	3 q	8.16	3rd place, bronze medalist(s)
Benjamin Gföhler	Long jump	7.41	29	Did not advance	

=== Women ===
Track events

Athlete	Event	Heat		Semi-final		Final	
Athlete	Event	Result	Rank	Result	Rank	Result	Rank
Ajla del Ponte	100 metres	11.41 (+0.1)	5	Did not advance			
Géraldine Frey	100 metres	11.30 (+0.8)	5	Did not advance			
Mujinga Kambundji	100 metres	10.97 (−0.1)	1 Q	10.96 (−0.2)	4 q	10.91 (+0.8)	5
Mujinga Kambundji	200 metres	22.34 (+0.9)	2 Q	22.05 (+2.0) NR	3 q	22.55 (+0.6)	8
Silke Lemmens	400 metres	52.86	5	Did not advance			
Lore Hoffmann	800 metres	2:01.63	3 Q	1:59.88 SB	4	Did not advance	
Ditaji Kambundji	100 metres hurdles	13.12 (+1.5)	5 q	12.70 (+0.9) PB	6	Did not advance	
Noemi Zbären	100 metres hurdles	13.00 (−0.4)	3 Q	12.94 (+0.3) SB	7	Did not advance	
Yasmin Giger	400 metres hurdles	55.90 SB	4 q	56.31	8	Did not advance	
Chiara Scherrer	3000 metres steeplechase	9:22.15	9	—N/a		Did not advance	
Sarah Atcho*; Ajla del Ponte; Géraldine Frey; Mujinga Kambundji; Salomé Kora	4 × 100 metres relay	42.73	5 q	—N/a		42.81	7
Annina Fahr; Yasmin Giger; Silke Lemmens; Julia Niederberger	4 × 400 metres relay	3:29.11 SB	4 q	—N/a		3:27.81 SB	8

* – Indicates the athlete competed in preliminaries but not the final.

Field events

Athlete	Event	Qualification		Final	
Athlete	Event	Distance	Position	Distance	Position
Angelica Moser	Pole vault	4.35	=12 q	4.60	8

Combined events – Heptathlon

Athlete	Event	100H	HJ	SP	200 m	LJ	JT	800 m	Final	Rank
Annik Kälin	Result	13.17 (+0.7) PB	1.74	13.71	24.05 (+1.5)	6.56	48.25	2:17.49 SB	6464 NR	6
Annik Kälin	Points	1099	903	775	976	1027	826	858	6464 NR	6
