= 2022 World Athletics Championships – Men's javelin throw =

Men's javelin throw at the 2022 World Championships
- Venue: Hayward Field
- Dates: 21 July (qualification); 23 July (final)
- Competitors: 32 from 20 nations
- Winning distance: 90.54

Medalists
gold medal	Anderson Peters	Grenada
silver medal	Neeraj Chopra	India
bronze medal	Jakub Vadlejch	Czech Republic

The men's javelin throw at the 2022 World Athletics Championships was held at the Hayward Field in Eugene on 21 and 23 July 2022.

== Records ==
Before the competition records were as follows:

Record	Athlete & Nat.	Perf.	Location	Date
World record	Jan Železný (CZE)	98.48 m	Jena, Germany	25 May 1996
Championship record	Jan Železný (CZE)	92.80 m	Edmonton, Canada	12 August 2001
World Leading	Anderson Peters (GRN)	93.07 m	Doha, Qatar	13 May 2022
African Record	Julius Yego (KEN)	92.72 m	Beijing, China	26 August 2015
Asian Record	Cheng Chao-tsun (TPE)	91.36 m	Taipei City, Taipei	26 August 2017
North, Central American and Caribbean record	Anderson Peters (GRN)	93.07 m	Doha, Qatar	13 May 2022
South American Record	Edgar Baumann (PAR)	84.70 m	San Marcos, United States	17 October 1999
European Record	Jan Železný (CZE)	98.48 m	Jena, Germany	25 May 1996
Oceanian record	Jarrod Bannister (AUS)	89.02 m	Brisbane, Australia	29 February 2008

== Qualification standard ==
The standard to qualify automatically for entry was 85.00 m.

== Schedule ==
The event schedule, in local time (UTC−7), was as follows:

Date	Time	Round
21 July	17:05	Qualification
23 July	18:35	Final

== Results ==
=== Qualification ===
Qualification: Automatic qualifying mark 83.50 (Q) or at least best 12 qualify to Final (q) advanced to the final.

Rank	Group	Name	Nationality	Round			Mark	Notes
Rank	Group	Name	Nationality	1	2	3	Mark	Notes
1	B	Anderson Peters	Grenada	89.91			89.91	Q
2	A	Neeraj Chopra	India	88.39			88.39	Q
3	B	Julian Weber	Germany	87.28			87.28	Q
4	A	Jakub Vadlejch	Czech Republic	85.23			85.23	Q
5	A	Ihab Abdelrahman	Egypt	77.34	83.41	x	83.41	q
6	B	Oliver Helander	Finland	82.41			82.41	q
7	A	Genki Dean	Japan	79.26	79.33	82.34	82.34	q, SB
8	A	Curtis Thompson	United States	81.73	81.50	x	81.73	q, SB
9	B	Arshad Nadeem	Pakistan	76.15	74.38	81.71	81.71	q, SB
10	B	Andrian Mardare	Moldova	80.83	79.41	x	80.83	q
11	B	Rohit Yadav	India	80.42	x	77.32	80.42	q
12	A	Lassi Etelätalo	Finland	75.41	79.40	80.03	80.03	q
13	B	Patriks Gailums	Latvia	75.49	75.63	79.66	79.66	
14	B	Julius Yego	Kenya	79.60	75.33	76.41	79.60	
15	A	Rolands Štrobinders	Latvia	77.83	76.50	79.39	79.39	
16	A	Keshorn Walcott	Trinidad and Tobago	x	78.87	76.63	78.87	
17	B	Manu Quijera	Spain	76.53	78.61	78.29	78.61	
18	A	Toni Keränen	Finland	76.13	78.52	x	78.52	
19	B	Kenji Ogura	Japan	78.48	75.22	77.20	78.48	
20	A	David Carreon	Mexico	77.61	76.79	76.80	77.61	
21	B	Cameron McEntyre	Australia	65.72	x	77.50	77.50	
22	B	Leandro Ramos	Portugal	77.34	76.27	72.48	77.34	
23	A	Johan Grobler	South Africa	76.30	73.74	x	76.30	
24	B	Tim Glover	United States	x	75.68	73.10	75.68	
25	A	Alexandru Novac	Romania	75.12	74.34	75.20	75.20	
26	A	Cruz Hogan	Australia	69.74	73.03	x	73.03	
27	B	Ethan Dabbs	United States	x	72.81	72.35	72.81	
	A	Andreas Hofmann	Germany	x	x	x	NM	

=== Final ===
Rank	Name	Nationality	Round						Mark	Notes
Rank	Name	Nationality	1	2	3	4	5	6	Mark	Notes
1st place, gold medalist(s)	Anderson Peters	Grenada	90.21	90.46	87.21	88.11	85.83	90.54	90.54	
2nd place, silver medalist(s)	Neeraj Chopra	India	x	82.39	86.37	88.13	x	x	88.13	
3rd place, bronze medalist(s)	Jakub Vadlejch	Czech Republic	85.52	87.23	88.09	83.48	81.31	82.88	88.09	
4	Julian Weber	Germany	86.86	71.88	73.00	x	81.76	83.53	86.86	
5	Arshad Nadeem	Pakistan	x	75.13	82.05	86.16	83.63	x	86.16	SB
6	Lassi Etelätalo	Finland	78.27	82.70	x	–	80.71	80.99	82.70	SB
7	Andrian Mardare	Moldova	79.55	x	82.26	79.42	81.07	x	82.26	
8	Oliver Helander	Finland	x	x	82.24	x	x	x	82.24	
9	Genki Dean	Japan	77.81	x	80.69				80.69	
10	Rohit Yadav	India	77.96	78.05	78.72				78.72	
11	Curtis Thompson	United States	78.39	x	x				78.39	
12	Ihab Abdelrahman	Egypt	x	72.76	75.99				75.99	
