= 2022 World Athletics Championships – Men's 35 kilometres walk =

35 km walk

Men's 35 kilometres walk at the 2022 World Championships
- Venue: Hayward Field
- Dates: 24 July
- Competitors: 52 from 28 nations
- Winning time: 2:23:14

Medalists
gold medal	Massimo Stano	Italy
silver medal	Masatora Kawano	Japan
bronze medal	Perseus Karlström	Sweden

Video on YouTube Official Video

The men's 35 kilometres walk at the 2022 World Athletics Championships was held at the Hayward Field in Eugene on 24 July 2022.

== Records ==
Before the competition records were as follows:

Record	Athlete & Nat.	Perf.	Location	Date
World record	world records will be recognised after 1 January 2023			
Championship record	new event			
World Leading	Masatora Kawano (JPN)	2:26:40	Wajima, Japan	17 April 2022
African Record	Wayne Snyman (RSA)	2:32:52	Cape Town, South Africa	15 January 2022
Asian Record	Masatora Kawano (JPN)	2:26:40	Wajima, Japan	17 April 2022
North, Central American and Caribbean record	José Luis Doctor (MEX)	2:29:24	Dudince, Slovakia	23 April 2022
South American Record	José Leonardo Montaña (COL)	2:30:46	Dudince, Slovakia	23 April 2022
European Record	Target performance	2:24:00		
Oceanian record	No ratified record			

== Qualification standard ==
The standard to qualify automatically for entry was 2:33:00 or 3:50:00 over 50 kilometres.

== Schedule ==
The event schedule, in local time (UTC−7), was as follows:

Date	Time	Round
24 July	06:15	Final

== Results ==
The event was started at 06:15.

Rank	Name	Nationality	Time	Cards	Notes
1st place, gold medalist(s)	Massimo Stano	Italy	2:23:14		CR, ER
2nd place, silver medalist(s)	Masatora Kawano	Japan	2:23:15		AR
3rd place, bronze medalist(s)	Perseus Karlström	Sweden	2:23:44		PB
4	Brian Pintado	Ecuador	2:24:37		AR
5	He Xianghong	China	2:24:45	~	NR
6	Evan Dunfee	Canada	2:25:02		AR
7	Caio Bonfim	Brazil	2:25:14		NR
8	Éider Arévalo	Colombia	2:25:21		NR
9	Tomohiro Noda	Japan	2:25:29	~	PB
10	Miguel Ángel López	Spain	2:25:58		NR
11	Ricardo Ortíz	Mexico	2:27:11		NR
12	Ever Palma	Mexico	2:27:55		PB
13	Aleksi Ojala	Finland	2:28:22	~ >	NR
14	Aurélien Quinion	France	2:28:46	~	NR
15	Zhaxi Yangben	China	2:28:56		PB
16	César Rodríguez	Peru	2:29:24	~	NR
17	Xu Hao	China	2:29:55	~	PB
18	Rhydian Cowley	Australia	2:30:34	>	NR
19	Dawid Tomala	Poland	2:30:47	> >	PB
20	Wayne Snyman	South Africa	2:31:15		AR
21	Miroslav Úradník	Slovakia	2:31:16		PB
22	José Luis Doctor	Mexico	2:32:43	~ ~ ~ PZ210	
23	Vít Hlaváč	Czech Republic	2:32:50		NR
24	Andrés Chocho	Ecuador	2:33:28		
25	Brendan Boyce	Ireland	2:33:31	> >	SB
26	Daisuke Matsunaga	Japan	2:33:56	>	
27	Marius Žiūkas	Lithuania	2:34:16	> >	NR
28	Diego Pinzón	Colombia	2:34:26		PB
29	Alexandros Papamichail	Greece	2:34:48	~	NR
30	Érick Barrondo	Guatemala	2:35:01		
31	Dominik Černý	Slovakia	2:35:39	>	PB
32	Álvaro López	Spain	2:36:20		
33	Arturas Mastianica	Lithuania	2:36:25		PB
34	Karl Junghannß	Germany	2:38:50	>	
35	Georgiy Sheiko	Kazakhstan	2:39:47	>	
36	Nick Christie	United States	2:41:08		SB
37	Arnis Rumbenieks	Latvia	2:42:47		
38	Marius Iulian Cocioran	Romania	2:43:27	>	
39	Rui Coelho	Portugal	2:44:55		SB
40	Carl Dohmann	Germany	2:45:44		
	Jhonatan Amores	Ecuador			DNF
	Carl Gibbons	Australia			DNF
	Luis Henry Campos	Peru		> ~ ~ PZ210	DNF
	José Leonardo Montaña	Colombia			DNF
	João Vieira	Portugal			DNF
	Andrea Agrusti	Italy		> > > >	DQ
	Artur Brzozowski	Poland		~ > > >	DQ
	Aku Partanen	Finland		~ ~ ~ >	DQ
	Luis Ángel Sánchez	Guatemala		~ ~ ~ >	DQ
	Marc Tur	Spain		> > > >	DQ
