= Norway at the 2022 World Athletics Championships =

- Flag of Norway
- WA code: NOR

in Eugene, United States 15 July 2022 – 24 July 2022
- Competitors: 21 (13 men and 8 women)
- Medals Ranked 12th: Gold 1 Silver 1 Bronze 1 Total 3

World Athletics Championships appearances (overview)
- 1980; 1983; 1987; 1991; 1993; 1995; 1997; 1999; 2001; 2003; 2005; 2007; 2009; 2011; 2013; 2015; 2017; 2019; 2022; 2023; 2025

Norway competed at the 2022 World Athletics Championships in Eugene, United States, from 15 to 24 July 2022.

== Medallists ==
Medal	Name	Event	Date
Gold	Jakob Ingebrigtsen	Men's 5000 metres	24 July
Silver	Jakob Ingebrigtsen	Men's 1500 metres	19 July
Bronze	Eivind Henriksen	Men's hammer throw	16 July

== Results ==
Norway entered 21 athletes.

Key

- Q = Qualified for the next round
- q = Qualified for the next round as a fastest loser or, in field events, by position without achieving the qualifying target
- NR = National record
- PB = Personal best
- SB = Season best
- N/A = Round not applicable for the event

=== Men ===
Track and road events

Athlete	Event	Heat		Semi-final		Final	
Athlete	Event	Result	Rank	Result	Rank	Result	Rank
Ferdinand Kvan Edman	1500 m	3:39.92	10	Did not advance			
Jakob Ingebrigtsen	1500 m	3:35.12	3 Q	3:37.02	3 Q	3:29.47 SB	2nd place, silver medalist(s)
Jakob Ingebrigtsen	5000 m	13:13.92	2 Q	—N/a		13:09.24	1st place, gold medalist(s)
Narve Gilje Nordås	5000 m	13:37.14	13	—N/a		Did not advance	
Karsten Warholm	400 m hurdles	49.34 SB	1 Q	48.00 SB	1 Q	48.42	7
Jacob Boutera	3000 m steeplechase	8:31.47	9	—N/a		Did not advance	
Tom Erling Kårbø	3000 m steeplechase	8:26.12 PB	8	—N/a		Did not advance	

Field events

Athlete	Event	Qualification		Final	
Athlete	Event	Distance	Position	Distance	Position
Simen Guttormsen	Pole vault	5.65	=15	Did not advance	
Sondre Guttormsen	Pole vault	5.75	=9 q	5.70	10
Pål Haugen Lillefosse	Pole vault	5.75	=9 q	5.80	9
Marcus Thomsen	Shot put	20.27	11 q	20.66	10
Eivind Henriksen	Hammer throw	78.12	6 Q	80.87 SB	3rd place, bronze medalist(s)
Thomas Mardal	Hammer throw	72.90	21	Did not advance	

Combined events – Decathlon

Athlete	Event	100 m	LJ	SP	HJ	400 m	110H	DT	PV	JT	1500 m	Final	Rank
Sander Skotheim	Result	10.88 PB	7.55	13.69	2.17	49.80	15.05	42.89	4.70	55.47	4:40.84	8062	15
Sander Skotheim	Points	888	947	709	963	824	843	724	819	670	675	8062	15

=== Women ===
Track and road events

Athlete	Event	Heat		Semi-final		Final	
Athlete	Event	Result	Rank	Result	Rank	Result	Rank
Elisabeth Slettum	200 m	23.55	7	Did not advance			
Hedda Hynne	800 m	2:06.27	8	Did not advance			
Karoline Bjerkeli Grøvdal	5000 m	14:53.07	4 Q	—N/a		14:57.62	8
Amalie Iuel	400 m hurdles	54.70 PB	3 Q	54.81	6	Did not advance	
Astri Ertzgaard; Elisabeth Slettum; Linn Oppegaard; Amalie Iuel	4 × 400 m relay	3:32.00	6	—N/a		Did not advance	

Field events

Athlete	Event	Qualification		Final	
Athlete	Event	Distance	Position	Distance	Position
Beatrice Nedberge Llano	Hammer throw	64.81	28	Did not advance	
