= Finland at the 2022 World Athletics Championships =

- Flag of Finland
- WA code: FIN
- National federation: Finnish Athletics Federation

in Eugene, United States 15 July 2022 – 24 July 2022
- Competitors: 36 (12 men and 24 women)
- Medals: Gold 0 Silver 0 Bronze 0 Total 0

World Athletics Championships appearances
- 1976; 1980; 1983; 1987; 1991; 1993; 1995; 1997; 1999; 2001; 2003; 2005; 2007; 2009; 2011; 2013; 2015; 2017; 2019; 2022; 2023; 2025

Finland competed at the 2022 World Athletics Championships in Eugene, United States, from 15 to 24 July 2022.

== Results ==
Finland entered 36 athletes.

Key

- Q = Qualified for the next round
- q = Qualified for the next round as a fastest loser or, in field events, by position without achieving the qualifying target
- NR = National record
- PB = Personal best
- SB = Season best
- N/A = Round not applicable for the event

=== Men ===
Track and road events

| Athlete | Event | Heat | | Semi-final | | Final | |
| Athlete | Event | Result | Rank | Result | Rank | Result | Rank |
|---|---|---|---|---|---|---|---|
| Elmo Lakka | 110 m hurdles | 13.91 | 7 | Did not advance | | | |
| Topi Raitanen | 3000 m steeplechase | 8:43.01 | 13 | — | | Did not advance | |
| Aleksi Ojala | 20 km walk | — | | | | 1:23:40 | 20 |
| Aleksi Ojala | 35 km walk | — | | | | 2:28:22 NR | 13 |
| Aku Partanen | 35 km walk | — | | | | DQ | – |

Field events

| Athlete | Event | Qualification | | Final | |
| Athlete | Event | Distance | Position | Distance | Position |
|---|---|---|---|---|---|
| Tommi Holttinen | Pole vault | 5.50 | =22 | Did not advance | |
| Mikko Paavola | Pole vault | 5.50 | =19 | Did not advance | |
| Kristian Pulli | Long jump | 7.56 | 26 | Did not advance | |
| Aaron Kangas | Hammer throw | 69.69 | 27 | Did not advance | |
| Tuomas Seppänen | Hammer throw | 72.81 | 23 | Did not advance | |
| Lassi Etelätalo | Javelin throw | 80.03 | 12 q | 82.70 SB | 6 |
| Oliver Helander | Javelin throw | 82.41 | 6 q | 82.24 | 8 |
| Toni Keränen | Javelin throw | 78.52 | 18 | Did not advance | |

=== Women ===
Track and road events

| Athlete | Event | Heat | | Semi-final | | Final | |
| Athlete | Event | Result | Rank | Result | Rank | Result | Rank |
|---|---|---|---|---|---|---|---|
| Anniina Kortetmaa | 200 m | 23.51 | 7 | Did not advance | | | |
| Eveliina Määttänen | 800 m | 2:02.68 | 6 | Did not advance | | | |
| Nathalie Blomqvist | 1500 m | 4:11.98 | 12 | Did not advance | | | |
| Camilla Richardsson | 5000 m | DNF | – | — | | Did not advance | |
| Alisa Vainio | Marathon | — | | | | 2:30:29 | 16 |
| Reetta Hurske | 100 m hurdles | 13.09 | 4 q | 13.15 | 8 | Did not advance | |
| Viivi Lehikoinen | 400 m hurdles | 54.95 | 3 Q | 54.60 NR | 6 | Did not advance | |
| Kristiina Halonen | 400 m hurdles | 56.68 PB | 5 | Did not advance | | | |
| Enni Nurmi | 20 km walk | — | | | | 1:37:29 | 29 |
| Tiia Kuikka | 35 km walk | — | | | | DQ | – |
| Elisa Neuvonen | 35 km walk | — | | | | 2:57:42 NR | 20 |

Field events

| Athlete | Event | Qualification | | Final | |
| Athlete | Event | Distance | Position | Distance | Position |
|---|---|---|---|---|---|
| Ella Junnila | High jump | 1.86 | =18 | Did not advance | |
| Sini Lällä | High jump | 1.86 | =21 | Did not advance | |
| Heta Tuuri | High jump | 1.86 | =21 | Did not advance | |
| Saga Andersson | Pole vault | 4.35 | =16 | Did not advance | |
| Elina Lampela | Pole vault | 4.20 | 26 | Did not advance | |
| Wilma Murto | Pole vault | 4.50 | =1 q | 4.60 SB | =6 |
| Kristiina Mäkelä | Triple jump | 14.48 PB | 4 Q | 14.18 | 9 |
| Senni Salminen | Triple jump | 14.21 | 14 | Did not advance | |
| Salla Sipponen | Discus throw | 57.16 | 26 | Did not advance | |
| Suvi Koskinen | Hammer throw | 67.98 | 23 | Did not advance | |
| Silja Kosonen | Hammer throw | 72.15 | 7 q | 70.81 | 7 |
| Krista Tervo | Hammer throw | 73.83 | 3 Q | 69.04 | 10 |
| Sanne Erkkola | Javelin throw | 52.04 | 26 | Did not advance | |
