= Spain at the 2022 World Athletics Championships =

Spain at the 2022 World Championships in Athletics
- WA code: ESP
- National federation: Real Federación Española de Atletismo
- Website: www.rfea.es

in Eugene, United States 15 July 2022 – 24 July 2022
- Medals Ranked 39th: Gold 0 Silver 0 Bronze 2 Total 2

World Championships in Athletics appearances (overview)
- 1976; 1980; 1983; 1987; 1991; 1993; 1995; 1997; 1999; 2001; 2003; 2005; 2007; 2009; 2011; 2013; 2015; 2017; 2019; 2022; 2023; 2025

Spain competed at the 2022 World Championships in Athletics in Eugene, United States, from 15 July to 24 July 2022.

== Medalists ==
Medal	Athlete	Event	Date
Bronze	Asier Martínez	Men's 110 metres hurdles	17 July
Bronze	Mohamed Katir	Men's 1500 metres	19 July

== Results ==
The following athletes were selected.

=== Men ===
Track and road events

Athlete	Event	Heat		Semifinal		Final	
Athlete	Event	Result	Rank	Result	Rank	Result	Rank
Álvaro de Arriba	800 metres	1:49.30	37 Q	1:46.30	15	did not advance	
Adrián Ben	800 metres	1:46.71	25	did not advance			
Mariano García	800 metres	1:45.74	12 Q	1:46.70	19	did not advance	
Ignacio Fontes	1500 metres	3:36.69	16 q	3:37.21	13 Q	3:34.71 SB	11
Mario García Romo	1500 metres	3:35.43 PB	5 Q	3:37.01	10 Q	3:30.20 PB	4
Mohamed Katir	1500 metres	3:39.45	29 Q	3:34.45	2 Q	3:29.90 SB	3rd place, bronze medalist(s)
Adel Mechaal	5000 metres	13:36.48	22	—N/a		did not advance	
Carlos Mayo	10000 metres	—N/a				27:50.61	13
Enrique Llopis	110 metres hurdles	13.58	24 q	13.44	16	did not advance	
Asier Martínez	110 metres hurdles	13.37	7 Q	13.26 SB	8 Q	13.17 PB	3rd place, bronze medalist(s)
Daniel Arce	3000 metres steeplechase	8:21.06	15 q	—N/a		8:30.05	9
Sebastián Martos	3000 metres steeplechase	8:18.94	9 q	—N/a		8:36.66	14
Víctor Ruiz	3000 metres steeplechase	8:33.42	30	—N/a		did not advance	
Bernat Canet; Jesús Gómez; Pol Retamal; Sergio López	4 × 100 metres relay	38.70 SB	9	—N/a		did not advance	
Alberto Amezcua	20 kilometres walk	—N/a				1:20:44	9
Diego García	20 kilometres walk	—N/a				1:23:21	16
Álvaro Martín	20 kilometres walk	—N/a				1:20:19	7
Álvaro López	35 kilometres walk	—N/a				2:36:20	32
Miguel Ángel López	35 kilometres walk	—N/a				2:25:58 NR	10
Marc Tur	35 kilometres walk	—N/a				DQ	-

Field events

Athlete	Event	Qualification		Final	
Athlete	Event	Width Height	Rank	Width Height	Rank
Eusebio Cáceres	Long jump	8.03	8 q	7.93	8
Héctor Santos	Long jump	NM	-	did not advance	
Pablo Torrijos	Triple jump	16.32	23	did not advance	
Carlos Tobalina	Shot put	19.70	24	did not advance	
Javier Cienfuegos	Hammer throw	74.25	14	did not advance	
Manu Quijera	Javelin throw	78.61	17	did not advance	

=== Women ===
Track and road events

Athlete	Event	Heat		Semifinal		Final	
Athlete	Event	Result	Rank	Result	Rank	Result	Rank
María Isabel Pérez	100 metres	11.30	33	did not advance			
Marta Pérez	1500 metres	4:05.92	15 q	4:04.24	9 q	4:04.25	11
Sara Gallego	400 metres hurdles	55.09	14 Q	54.49	11	did not advance	
Carolina Robles	3000 metres steeplechase	9:28.24 PB	26	—N/a		did not advance	
Irene Sánchez-Escribano	3000 metres steeplechase	9:23.94 PB	21	—N/a		did not advance	
Sonia Molina-Prados; Jaël Bestué; Paula Sevilla; María Isabel Pérez	4 × 100 metres relay	42.61 NR	5 Q	—N/a		42.58 NR	5
Eva Santidrián; Aauri Lorena Bokesa; Laura Hernández (athlete); Carmen Avilés	4 × 400 metres relay	3:32.87	13	—N/a		did not advance	
María Pérez	20 kilometres walk	—N/a				DQ	-
Laura García-Caro	35 kilometres walk	—N/a				2:42:45 PB	6
Raquel González	35 kilometres walk	—N/a				2:42:27 PB	5

Field events

Athlete	Event	Qualification		Final	
Athlete	Event	Width Height	Rank	Width Height	Rank
Fátima Diame	Long jump	6.54	16	did not advance	
María Belén Toimil	Shot put	17.48	21	did not advance	
Laura Redondo	Hammer throw	68.67	19	did not advance	

Combined events – Heptathlon

Athlete	Event	100H	HJ	SP	200 m	LJ	JT	800 m	Final	Rank
Claudia Conte	Result	13.65 PB	1.86 SB	12.46	24.77 PB	6.00	44.69	2:14.14	6194 PB	9
Claudia Conte	Points	1028	1054	692	908	850	757	905	6194 PB	9

=== Mixed ===
Athlete	Event	Heat		Final	
Athlete	Event	Result	Rank	Result	Rank
Iñaki Cañal; Sara Gallego; Óscar Husillos; Eva Santidrián	4 × 400 m relay	3:16.14 SB	11	did not advance	
