= Botswana at the 2022 World Athletics Championships =

- Flag of Botswana
- WA code: BOT

in Eugene, United States 15 July 2022 – 24 July 2022
- Competitors: 6 (6 men) in 3 events
- Medals: Gold 0 Silver 0 Bronze 0 Total 0

World Athletics Championships appearances
- 1983; 1987; 1991; 1993; 1995; 1997; 1999; 2001; 2003; 2005; 2007; 2009; 2011; 2013; 2015; 2017; 2019; 2022; 2023

Botswana competed at the 2022 World Athletics Championships in Eugene, United States, from 15 to 24 July 2022.

== Results ==
Botswana has entered 9 athletes.

Key

- Q = Qualified for the next round
- q = Qualified for the next round as a fastest loser or, in field events, by position without achieving the qualifying target
- NR = National record
- PB = Personal best
- SB = Season best
- N/A = Round not applicable for the event

=== Men ===
Track and road events

Athlete	Event	Heat		Semi-final		Final	
Athlete	Event	Result	Rank	Result	Rank	Result	Rank
Letsile Tebogo	100 metres	9.94 WU20R	10 Q	10.17	16	did not advance	
Isaac Makwala	400 metres	45.93	20 Q	46.04	21	did not advance	
Bayapo Ndori	400 metres	44.87 PB	1 Q	44.94	7 Q	45.29	5
Anthony Pesela	400 metres	47.36	37	did not advance			
Keitumetse Maitseo*; Isaac Makwala; Bayapo Ndori; Zibane Ngozi; Leungo Scotch	4 x 400 metres relay	3:07.32	13 qR	—		3:00.14 PB	6
