= Sweden at the 2022 World Athletics Championships =

- Flag of Sweden
- WA code: SWE

in Eugene, United States 15 July 2022 – 24 July 2022
- Competitors: 22 (11 men and 11 women)
- Medals Ranked 16th: Gold 1 Silver 0 Bronze 2 Total 3

World Athletics Championships appearances (overview)
- 1976; 1980; 1983; 1987; 1991; 1993; 1995; 1997; 1999; 2001; 2003; 2005; 2007; 2009; 2011; 2013; 2015; 2017; 2019; 2022; 2023; 2025

Sweden competed at the 2022 World Athletics Championships in Eugene, United States, from 15 to 24 July 2022.

== Medallists ==
Medal	Name	Event	Date
Gold	Armand Duplantis	Men's pole vault	24 July
Bronze	Perseus Karlström	Men's 20 kilometres walk	15 July
Bronze	Perseus Karlström	Men's 35 kilometres walk	24 July

== Results ==
Sweden entered 22 athletes.

Key

- Q = Qualified for the next round
- q = Qualified for the next round as a fastest loser or, in field events, by position without achieving the qualifying target
- NR = National record
- PB = Personal best
- SB = Season best
- N/A = Round not applicable for the event

=== Men ===
Track and road events

Athlete	Event	Heat		Semi-final		Final	
Athlete	Event	Result	Rank	Result	Rank	Result	Rank
Andreas Kramer	800 m	1:45.77	6	Did not advance			
David Nilsson	Marathon	—N/a				DNF	–
Carl Bengtström	400 m hurdles	49.64	3 Q	48.75	4	Did not advance	
Vidar Johansson	3000 m steeplechase	8:33.51	10	—N/a		Did not advance	
Perseus Karlström	20 km walk	—N/a				1:19:18 SB	3rd place, bronze medalist(s)
Perseus Karlström	35 km walk	—N/a				2:23:44 PB	3rd place, bronze medalist(s)

Field events

Athlete	Event	Qualification		Final	
Athlete	Event	Distance	Position	Distance	Position
Armand Duplantis	Pole vault	5.75	=1 q	6.21 WR	1st place, gold medalist(s)
Thobias Montler	Long jump	8.09	4 q	7.81	11
Simon Pettersson	Discus throw	68.11 SB	3 Q	67.00	5
Daniel Ståhl	Discus throw	65.95	7 q	67.10	4
Ragnar Carlsson	Hammer throw	73.45	20	Did not advance	

Combined events – Decathlon

Athlete	Event	100 m	LJ	SP	HJ	400 m	110H	DT	PV	JT	1500 m	Final	Rank
Marcus Nilsson	Result	11.46	5.90	DNS	–	–	–	–	–	–	–	DNF	–
Marcus Nilsson	Points	761	565	0								DNF	–

=== Women ===
Track and road events

Athlete	Event	Heat		Semi-final		Final	
Athlete	Event	Result	Rank	Result	Rank	Result	Rank
Hanna Hermansson	1500 m	4:06.30 PB	9	Did not advance			
Yolanda Ngarambe	1500 m	4:09.15	8	Did not advance			
Sarah Lahti	5000 m	15:26.05	10	—N/a		Did not advance	
Hanna Lindholm	Marathon	—N/a				2:32:08 SB	24
Carolina Wikström	Marathon	—N/a				2:32:24	25

Field events

Athlete	Event	Qualification		Final	
Athlete	Event	Distance	Position	Distance	Position
Maja Nilsson	High jump	1.90	=15	Did not advance	
Lisa Gunnarsson	Pole vault	4.35	=16	Did not advance	
Khaddi Sagnia	Long jump	6.78	5 Q	6.87	6
Axelina Johansson	Shot put	18.57 PB	12 q	17.60	12
Fanny Roos	Shot put	18.72	11 q	18.27	11
Grete Ahlberg	Hammer throw	70.87 PB	12 q	70.11	9
