= France at the 2022 World Athletics Championships =

- Flag of France
- WA code: FRA

in Eugene, United States 15 July 2022 – 24 July 2022
- Competitors: 45 (32 men and 13 women)
- Medals Ranked 22nd: Gold 1 Silver 0 Bronze 0 Total 1

World Athletics Championships appearances (overview)
- 1976; 1980; 1983; 1987; 1991; 1993; 1995; 1997; 1999; 2001; 2003; 2005; 2007; 2009; 2011; 2013; 2015; 2017; 2019; 2022; 2023; 2025

France competed at the 2022 World Athletics Championships in Eugene, United States, from 15 to 24 July 2022.

== Medallists ==
Medal	Name	Event	Date
Gold	Kevin Mayer	Men's decathlon	24 July

== Results ==
France entered 45 athletes.

Key

- Q = Qualified for the next round
- q = Qualified for the next round as a fastest loser or, in field events, by position without achieving the qualifying target
- NR = National record
- PB = Personal best
- SB = Season best
- N/A = Round not applicable for the event

=== Men ===
Track and road events

Athlete	Event	Heat		Semi-final		Final	
Athlete	Event	Result	Rank	Result	Rank	Result	Rank
Mouhamadou Fall	200 m	20.83	5	Did not advance			
Benjamin Robert	800 m	1:45.94	4 q	1:45.67	4	Did not advance	
Gabriel Tual	800 m	1:46.34	2 Q	1:45.53	2 Q	1:45.49	6
Jimmy Gressier	10,000 m	—				27:44.55	11
Hassan Chahdi	Marathon	—				2:09:20	17
Just Kwaou-Mathey	110 m hurdles	13.32	3 Q	13.25	5	Did not advance	
Pascal Martinot-Lagarde	110 m hurdles	13.49	5 q	13.40 SB	4	Did not advance	
Sasha Zhoya	110 m hurdles	13.48	3 Q	13.47	5	Did not advance	
Wilfried Happio	400 m hurdles	49.60	3 Q	48.14 PB	2 Q	47.41 PB	4
Mehdi Belhadj	3000 m steeplechase	8:20.47	4 q	—		8:34.49	13
Aurélien Quinion	35 km walk	—				2:28:46 NR	14
Méba-Mickaël Zeze; Pablo Matéo; Ryan Zeze; Jimmy Vicaut	4 × 100 m relay	38.09 SB	1 Q	—		DQ	–
Thomas Jordier; Loïc Prévot; Simon Boypa; Teo Andant	4 × 400 m relay	3:03.13 SB	4 q	—		3:01.35	7

Field events

Athlete	Event	Qualification		Final	
Athlete	Event	Distance	Position	Distance	Position
Thibaut Collet	Pole vault	5.65	18	Did not advance	
Renaud Lavillenie	Pole vault	5.75	8 q	5.87 SB	=5
Valentin Lavillenie	Pole vault	NM	–	Did not advance	
Benjamin Compaoré	Triple jump	16.03	25	Did not advance	
Enzo Hodebar	Triple jump	16.64	14	Did not advance	
Jean-Marc Pontvianne	Triple jump	16.95	6 q	16.86	8
Quentin Bigot	Hammer throw	77.95	7 Q	80.24	4
Yann Chaussinand	Hammer throw	73.95	18	Did not advance	

Combined events – Decathlon

Athlete	Event	100 m	LJ	SP	HJ	400 m	110H	DT	PV	JT	1500 m	Final	Rank
Kevin Mayer	Result	10.62 SB	7.54 SB	14.98	2.05 SB	49.40 SB	13.92 SB	49.44 SB	5.40 SB	70.31 SB	4:41.44 SB	8816 SB	1st place, gold medalist(s)
Kevin Mayer	Points	947	945	788	850	842	985	859	1035	894	671	8816 SB	1st place, gold medalist(s)

=== Women ===
Track and road events

Athlete	Event	Heat		Semi-final		Final	
Athlete	Event	Result	Rank	Result	Rank	Result	Rank
Rénelle Lamote	800 m	2:00.71	1 Q	2:00.86	6	Did not advance	
Laëticia Bapté	100 m hurdles	13.03	5 q	12.93	6	Did not advance	
Cyréna Samba-Mayela	100 m hurdles	13.15	4	Did not advance			
Alice Finot	3000 m steeplechase	9:14.34 NR	1 Q	—		9:21.40	10
Sokhna Lacoste; Shana Grebo; Sounkamba Sylla; Amandine Brossier	4 × 400 metres relay	3:28.89 SB	3 Q	—		3:25.81 SB	5

Field events

Athlete	Event	Qualification		Final	
Athlete	Event	Distance	Position	Distance	Position
Ninon Chapelle	Pole vault	4.50	=1 q	4.45	11
Margot Chevrier	Pole vault	4.50	=10 q	NM	–
Mélina Robert-Michon	Discus throw	61.21	12 q	60.36	10
