= South Africa at the 2022 World Athletics Championships =

- WA code: RSA

in Eugene, United States 15 July 2022 – 24 July 2022
- Competitors: 38 (25 men and 13 women) in 26 events
- Medals: Gold 0 Silver 0 Bronze 0 Total 0

World Athletics Championships appearances
- 1993; 1995; 1997; 1999; 2001; 2003; 2005; 2007; 2009; 2011; 2013; 2015; 2017; 2019; 2022; 2023; 2025

South Africa competed at the 2022 World Athletics Championships in Eugene, United States, from 15 to 24 July 2022.

== Results ==
South Africa entered 43 athletes.

Key

- Q = Qualified for the next round
- q = Qualified for the next round as a fastest loser or, in field events, by position without achieving the qualifying target
- NR = National record
- PB = Personal best
- SB = Season best
- N/A = Round not applicable for the event

=== Men ===
Track and road events

Athlete	Event	Heat		Semi-final		Final	
Athlete	Event	Result	Rank	Result	Rank	Result	Rank
Akani Simbine	100 m	10.07	14 q	9.97 SB	3 Q	10.01	5
Gift Leotlela	100 m	10.19	30	Did not advance			
Clarence Munyai	100 m	10.47	44	Did not advance			
Luxolo Adams	200 m	20.10	4 Q	20.09	7 q	20.47	8
Sinesipho Dambile	200 m	20.29 PB	11 Q	20.47	16	Did not advance	
Shaun Maswanganyi	200 m	20.79	37	Did not advance			
Wayde van Niekerk	400 m	45.18	2 Q	44.75	5 Q	44.97	5
Zakithi Nene	400 m	45.69	11 Q	45.24	11	Did not advance	
Tshepo Tshite	800 m	1:47.61	31	Did not advance			
Ryan Mphahlele	1500 m	3:39.17	25	Did not advance			
Adriaan Wildschutt	5000 m	13:44.32	30	—		Did not advance	
Lesiba Precious Mashele	5000 m	13:52.37	34	—		Did not advance	
Melikhaya Frans	Marathon	—				2:09:24 PB	18
Tumelo Motlagale	Marathon	—				2:20:21	52
Antonio Alkana	110 m hurdles	13.64	27	Did not advance			
Sokwakhana Zazini	400 m hurdles	50.09	23 q	50.22	20	Did not advance	
Henricho Bruintjies*; Emile Erasmus; Clarence Munyai; Akani Simbine; Gift Leotlela	4 × 100 m relay	38.31 SB	4	—		38.10 SB	6
	4 × 400 m relay	Did not start		—		Did not advance	
Wayne Snyman	20 km walk	—				1:21:23	12
Wayne Snyman	35 km walk	—				2:31:15 AR	20

Field events

Athlete	Event	Qualification		Final	
Athlete	Event	Distance	Position	Distance	Position
Ruswahl Samaai	Long jump	7.86 SB	15	Did not advance	
Jovan van Vuuren	Long jump	7.80	19	Did not advance	
Cheswill Johnson	Long jump	NM		Did not advance	
Victor Hogan	Discus throw	60.51	24	Did not advance	
Werner Visser	Discus throw	58.44	27	Did not advance	
Victor Hogan	Javelin throw	76.30	23	Did not advance	

=== Women ===
Track and road events

Athlete	Event	Heat		Semi-final		Final	
Athlete	Event	Result	Rank	Result	Rank	Result	Rank
Carina Horn	100 m	11.29	32	Did not advance			
Shirley Nekhubui	200 m	23.46	36	Did not advance			
Miranda Coetzee	400 m	53.30	41	Did not advance			
Prudence Sekgodiso	800 m	2:01.60	20 q	2:00.01	10		
Caster Semenya	5000 m	15:46.12	28	—		Did not advance	
Dominique Scott	10,000 m	—				31:40.73	17
Marione Fourie	100 m hurdles	12.94	13 Q	12.93 =PB	19	Did not advance	
Zenéy van der Walt	400 m hurdles	55.05	13	54.81 PB	16	Did not advance	
Taylon Bieldt	400 m hurdles	56.67	27	Did not advance			
Miranda Coetzee; Marlie Viljoen; Gontse Morake; Zenéy van der Walt	4 × 400 metres relay	3:46.68	14	—		Did not advance	

Field events

Athlete	Event	Qualification		Final	
Athlete	Event	Distance	Position	Distance	Position
Ischke Senekal	Shot put	15.40	29	Did not advance	
Jo-Ane van Dyk	Javelin throw	57.79	15	Did not advance	
