= Puerto Rico at the 2022 World Athletics Championships =

- Flag of Puerto Rico
- WA code: PUR
- National federation: Puerto Rican Athletics Federation
- Website: www.atletismofapur.com

in Eugene, United States 15–24 July 2022
- Competitors: 8 (1 man and 7 women) in 7 events
- Medals Ranked 40th: Gold 0 Silver 0 Bronze 1 Total 1

World Athletics Championships appearances (overview)
- 1983; 1987; 1991; 1993; 1995; 1997; 1999; 2001; 2003; 2005; 2007; 2009; 2011; 2013; 2015; 2017; 2019; 2022; 2023; 2025

Puerto Rico competed at the 2022 World Athletics Championships in Eugene, Oregon from 15 to 24 July 2022. Puerto Rico had entered 8 athletes.

== Medalists ==
Medal	Athlete	Event	Date
Bronze	Jasmine Camacho-Quinn	Women's 100 metres hurdles	24 July

== Results ==
Key

- Q = Qualified for the next round
- q = Not qualified for the next round as a fastest loser or, in field events, by position without achieving the qualifying target
- NR = National record
- PB = Personal best
- SB = Season best
- N/A = Round not applicable for the event

=== Men ===
Combined events – Decathlon

Athlete	Event	100 m	LJ	SP	HJ	400 m	110H	DT	PV	JT	1500 m	Final	Rank
Ayden Owens-Delerme	Result	10.52	7.64 PB	14.97	2.02	45.07 PB	13.88	42.36	4.50	50.98	4:13.02 PB	8532 NR	4
Ayden Owens-Delerme	Points	970	970	788	822	1056	990	713	760	603	860	8532 NR	4

=== Women ===
Track and road events

Athlete	Event	Heat		Semi-final		Final	
Athlete	Event	Result	Rank	Result	Rank	Result	Rank
Gabby Scott	400 metres	52.05	22 Q	51.97	20	Did not advance	
Beverly Ramos	Marathon	—				2:31:10 NR	20
Jasmine Camacho-Quinn	100 metres hurdles	12.52	3 Q	12.32 SB	4 Q	12.23	3rd place, bronze medalist(s)
Paola Vazquez	100 metres hurdles	13.13	27	Did not advance			
Grace Claxton	400 metres hurdles	56.40	26	Did not advance			
Rachelle De Orbeta	20 kilometres walk	—				1:41:55	36

Field events

Athlete	Event	Qualification		Final	
Athlete	Event	Distance	Position	Distance	Position
Coralys Ortiz	Javelin throw	58.52	14	Did not advance	
