= Barbados at the 2022 World Athletics Championships =

- Flag of Barbados
- WA code: BAR
- National federation: Athletics Association of Barbados
- Website: aab.sports.bb

in Eugene, United States 15 July 2022 – 24 July 2022
- Competitors: 3 (2 men and 1 woman) in 3 events
- Medals Ranked 40th: Gold 0 Silver 0 Bronze 1 Total 1

World Athletics Championships appearances
- 1983; 1987; 1991; 1993; 1995; 1997; 1999; 2001; 2003; 2005; 2007; 2009; 2011; 2013; 2015; 2017; 2019; 2022; 2023

Barbados competed at the 2022 World Athletics Championships in Eugene, United States, from 15 to 24 July 2022.

== Medalists ==
Medal	Athlete	Event	Date
Bronze	Sada Williams	400 metres	July 22

== Results ==
Barbados has entered 3 athletes.

Key

- Q = Qualified for the next round
- q = Qualified for the next round as a fastest loser or, in field events, by position without achieving the qualifying target
- NR = National record
- PB = Personal best
- SB = Season best
- N/A = Round not applicable for the event

=== Men ===
Track and road events

Athlete	Event	Heat		Semi-final		Final	
Athlete	Event	Result	Rank	Result	Rank	Result	Rank
Jonathan Jones	400 metres	45.46	6 Q	44.78	6 q	46.13	8
Shane Brathwaite	110 metres hurdles	13.47 (+0.2)	13 Q	13.21 (+2.5)	5 q	DQ	

=== Women ===
Track and road events

Athlete	Event	Heat		Semi-final		Final	
Athlete	Event	Result	Rank	Result	Rank	Result	Rank
Sada Williams	400 m	51.05	7 Q	50.12 SB	4 Q	49.75 NR	3rd place, bronze medalist(s)
