= Czech Republic at the 2022 World Athletics Championships =

- Flag of the Czech Republic
- WA code: CZE

in Eugene, United States 15 July 2022 – 24 July 2022
- Competitors: 24 (15 men and 9 women)
- Medals Ranked 40th: Gold 0 Silver 0 Bronze 1 Total 1

World Athletics Championships appearances
- 1993; 1995; 1997; 1999; 2001; 2003; 2005; 2007; 2009; 2011; 2013; 2015; 2017; 2019; 2022; 2023; 2025

The Czech Republic competed at the 2022 World Athletics Championships in Eugene, United States, from 15 to 24 July 2022.

Decathlete Ondřej Kopecký did not start due to an injury.

== Medallists ==
Medal	Name	Event	Date
Bronze	Jakub Vadlejch	Men's javelin throw	23 July

== Results ==
The Czech Republic entered 24 athletes.

Key

- Q = Qualified for the next round
- q = Qualified for the next round as a fastest loser or, in field events, by position without achieving the qualifying target
- NR = National record
- PB = Personal best
- SB = Season best
- N/A = Round not applicable for the event

=== Men ===
Track and road events

Athlete	Event	Heat		Semi-final		Final	
Athlete	Event	Result	Rank	Result	Rank	Result	Rank
Jan Jirka	200 m	20.73	7	Did not advance			
Patrik Šorm	400 m	46.07	5	Did not advance			
Filip Sasínek	1500 m	3:39.47	8	Did not advance			
Petr Svoboda	110 m hurdles	13.65	7	Did not advance			
Vít Müller	400 m hurdles	50.71	7	Did not advance			
Vít Hlaváč	35 km walk	—N/a				2:32:50 NR	23
Matěj Krsek; Pavel Maslák; Michal Desenský; Patrik Šorm	4 × 400 m relay	3:02.42 =NR	2 Q	—N/a		3:01.63 NR	8

Field events

Athlete	Event	Qualification		Final	
Athlete	Event	Distance	Position	Distance	Position
Radek Juska	Long jump	7.87	14	Did not advance	
Marek Bárta	Discus throw	62.90	15	Did not advance	
Jakub Vadlejch	Javelin throw	85.23	4 Q	88.09	3rd place, bronze medalist(s)

Combined events – Decathlon

Athlete	Event	100 m	LJ	SP	HJ	400 m	110H	DT	PV	JT	1500 m	Final	Rank
Jiří Sýkora	Result	11.11 SB	7.14	14.89	1.93	49.29	14.14	54.39 CDB	4.60	61.49 SB	4:55.90 SB	8107 SB	13
Jiří Sýkora	Points	836	847	783	740	848	957	962	790	760	584	8107 SB	13

=== Women ===
Track and road events

Athlete	Event	Heat		Semi-final		Final	
Athlete	Event	Result	Rank	Result	Rank	Result	Rank
Lada Vondrová	400 m	51.55	4 q	51.47	6	Did not advance	
Kristiina Mäki	1500 m	4:08.43	6 Q	4:21.67	12	Did not advance	
Diana Mezuliáníková	1500 m	4:06.55 SB	8	Did not advance			
Tereza Hrochová	Marathon	—N/a				2:30:39 SB	17
Helena Jiranová	100 m hurdles	13.37	5	Did not advance			
Eliška Martínková	20 km walk	—N/a				1:34:45	21
Tereza Ďurdiaková	35 km walk	—N/a				DNF	–

Field events

Athlete	Event	Qualification		Final	
Athlete	Event	Distance	Position	Distance	Position
Amálie Švábíková	Pole vault	4.20	=26	Did not advance	
Nikola Ogrodníková	Javelin throw	60.59	6	60.18	8
