= Japan at the 2022 World Athletics Championships =

- Flag of Japan
- WA code: JPN
- National federation: Japan Association of Athletics Federations
- Website: https://www.jaaf.or.jp/english/

in Eugene, United States 15 – 24 July 2022
- Competitors: 68 (41 men and 27 women) in 30 events
- Medals Ranked 9th: Gold 1 Silver 2 Bronze 1 Total 4

World Athletics Championships appearances
- 1983; 1987; 1991; 1993; 1995; 1997; 1999; 2001; 2003; 2005; 2007; 2009; 2011; 2013; 2015; 2017; 2019; 2022; 2023; 2025

Japan competed at the 2022 World Athletics Championships in Eugene, Oregon from 15 to 24 July 2022. Japan entered 68 athletes. They finished with one gold medal, two silver, and a bronze medal.

== Medalists ==
Medal	Athlete	Event	Date
Gold	Toshikazu Yamanishi	Men's 20 kilometres walk	15 July
Silver	Koki Ikeda	Men's 20 kilometres walk	15 July
Silver	Masatora Kawano	Men's 35 kilometres walk	24 July
Bronze	Haruka Kitaguchi	Women's javelin throw	22 July

== Results ==
Key

- Q = Qualified for the next round
- q = Qualified for the next round as a fastest loser or, in field events, by position without achieving the qualifying target
- NR = National record
- PB = Personal best
- SB = Season best
- N/A = Round not applicable for the event

=== Men ===
Track and road events

Athlete	Event	Heat		Semi-final		Final	
Athlete	Event	Result	Rank	Result	Rank	Result	Rank
Ryuichiro Sakai	100 metres	10.12 (+0.2)	20 Q	10.23 (+0.1)	21	Did not advance	
Abdul Hakim Sani Brown	100 metres	9.98 (−0.3) SB	6 Q	10.05 (+0.3)	7 q	10.06	7
Shota Iizuka	200 metres	20.72 (+0.0)	33 Q	20.77 (−0.1)	22	Did not advance	
Yuki Koike	200 metres	DNS		Did not advance			
Koki Ueyama	200 metres	20.26 (+1.0) PB	10 Q	20.48 (+0.3)	17	Did not advance	
Kaito Kawabata	400 metres	46.34	27	Did not advance			
Fuga Sato	400 metres	45.88	18 q	45.71	17	Did not advance	
Julian Jrummi Walsh	400 metres	45.90	19 q	45.75	18	Did not advance	
Hyuga Endo	5000 metres	13:47.07	31	—N/a		Did not advance	
Tatsuhiko Ito	10,000 metres	—N/a				28:57.85	22
Ren Tazawa	10,000 metres	—N/a				28:24.25	20
Gaku Hoshi	Marathon	—N/a				2:13:44	38
Yusuke Nishiyama	Marathon	—N/a				2:08:35	13
Kengo Suzuki	Marathon	—N/a				DNS	
Ryoma Aoki	3000 metres steeplechase	8:33.89	33	—N/a		Did not advance	
Ryuji Miura	3000 metres steeplechase	8:21.80	16	—N/a		Did not advance	
Kosei Yamaguchi	3000 metres steeplechase	8:30.92	28	—N/a		Did not advance	
Shuhei Ishikawa	110 metres hurdles	13.53 (−0.3)	20 Q	13.68 (−0.6)	24	Did not advance	
Shunsuke Izumiya	110 metres hurdles	13.56 (+0.4)	22 Q	13.42 (+0.3)	14	Did not advance	
Rachid Muratake	110 metres hurdles	13.73 (+0.2)	30	Did not advance			
Takayuki Kishimoto	400 metres hurdles	50.66	29	Did not advance			
Kazuki Kurokawa	400 metres hurdles	50.02	21 Q	49.69	16	Did not advance	
Yuki Koike; Ryuichiro Sakai; Abdul Hakim Sani Brown; Ryota Suzuki; Koki Ueyama; Hiroki Yanagita	4 × 100 metres relay	DQ		—N/a		Did not advance	
Ryuki Iwasaki; Kaito Kawabata; Mitsuki Kawauchi; Yuki Joseph Nakajima; Fuga Sato; Julian Jrummi Walsh	4 × 400 metres relay	3:01.53 SB	2 Q	—N/a		2:59.51	4
Toshikazu Yamanishi	20 kilometres walk	—N/a				1:19:07 SB	1st place, gold medalist(s)
Koki Ikeda	20 kilometres walk	—N/a				1:19:14	2nd place, silver medalist(s)
Hiroto Jusho	20 kilometres walk	—N/a				1:20:39	8
Eiki Takahashi	20 kilometres walk	—N/a				1:26:46	29
Masatora Kawano	35 kilometres walk	—N/a				2:23:15	2nd place, silver medalist(s)
Daisuke Matsunaga	35 kilometres walk	—N/a				2:33:56	26
Tomohiro Noda	35 kilometres walk	—N/a				2:25:29	9

Field events

Athlete	Event	Qualification		Final	
Athlete	Event	Distance	Position	Distance	Position
Ryoichi Akamatsu	High jump	2.21	19	Did not advance	
Tomohiro Shinno	High jump	2.28	6 q	2.27	8
Seito Yamamoto	Pole vault	5.65	15	Did not advance	
Yuki Hashioka	Long jump	8.18 (+0.4)	1 Q	7.86 (+0.4)	10
Natsuki Yamakawa	Long jump	7.75 (+0.5)	21	Did not advance	
Roderick Genki Dean	Javelin	82.34 SB	7 q	80.69	9
Kenji Ogura	Javelin	78.48	19	Did not advance	

=== Women ===
Track and road events

Athlete	Event	Heat		Semi-final		Final	
Athlete	Event	Result	Rank	Result	Rank	Result	Rank
Nozomi Tanaka	800 metres	2:03.56	38	Did not advance			
Nozomi Tanaka	1500 metres	4:05.30 SB	14 q	4:05.79	15	Did not advance	
Ran Urabe	1500 metres	4:14.82	40	Did not advance			
Nozomi Tanaka	5000 metres	15:00.21 SB	14 q	—N/a		15:19.35	12
Ririka Hironaka	5000 metres	15:02.03 SB	16	—N/a		Did not advance	
Kaede Hagitani	5000 metres	15:53.39	30	—N/a		Did not advance	
Rino Goshima	10,000 metres	—N/a				32:08.68	19
Ririka Hironaka	10,000 metres	—N/a				30:39.71 PB	12
Narumi Kobayashi	10,000 metres	—N/a				—N/a	
Mao Ichiyama	Marathon	—N/a				—N/a	
Hitomi Niiya	Marathon	—N/a				DNS	
Mizuki Matsuda	Marathon	—N/a				2:23:49	9
Yuno Yamanaka	3000 metres steeplechase	10:18.18	42	—N/a		Did not advance	
Reimi Yoshimura	3000 metres steeplechase	9:58.07	40	—N/a		Did not advance	
Masumi Aoki	100 metres hurdles	13.12 (−0.4)	22 q	13.04	21	Did not advance	
Mako Fukube	100 metres hurdles	12.96 (+0.5)	15 q	12.82	16	Did not advance	
Masumi Aoki; Hanae Aoyama; Arisa Kimishima; Mei Kodama; Midori Mikase	4 × 100 metres relay	43.33 NR	12	—N/a		Did not advance	
Nanako Fujii	20 kilometres walk	—N/a				1:29:01 SB	6
Kumiko Okada	20 kilometres walk	—N/a				1:31:53	14
Serena Sonoda	35 kilometres walk	—N/a				2:45:09 PB	9

Field events

Athlete	Event	Qualification		Final	
Athlete	Event	Distance	Position	Distance	Position
Sumire Hata	Long jump	6.39 (+0.4)	20	Did not advance	
Haruka Kitaguchi	Javelin	64.32 SB	1 Q	63.27	3rd place, bronze medalist(s)
Sae Takemoto	Javelin	59.15	11 q	57.93	11
Momone Ueda	Javelin	50.70	27	Did not advance	

=== Mixed ===
Track and road events

Athlete	Event	Heat		Final	
Athlete	Event	Result	Rank	Result	Rank
Yuki Joseph Nakajima; Nanako Matsumoto; Ryuki Iwasaki; Mayu Kobayashi; Mitsuki Kawauchi*; Haruna Kuboyama*	4 × 400 metres relay	3:17.31 SB	13	Did not advance	
