= 2022 World Athletics Championships – Women's 3000 metres steeplechase =

Women's 3000 metres steeplechase

Women's 3000 metres steeplechase at the 2022 World Championships
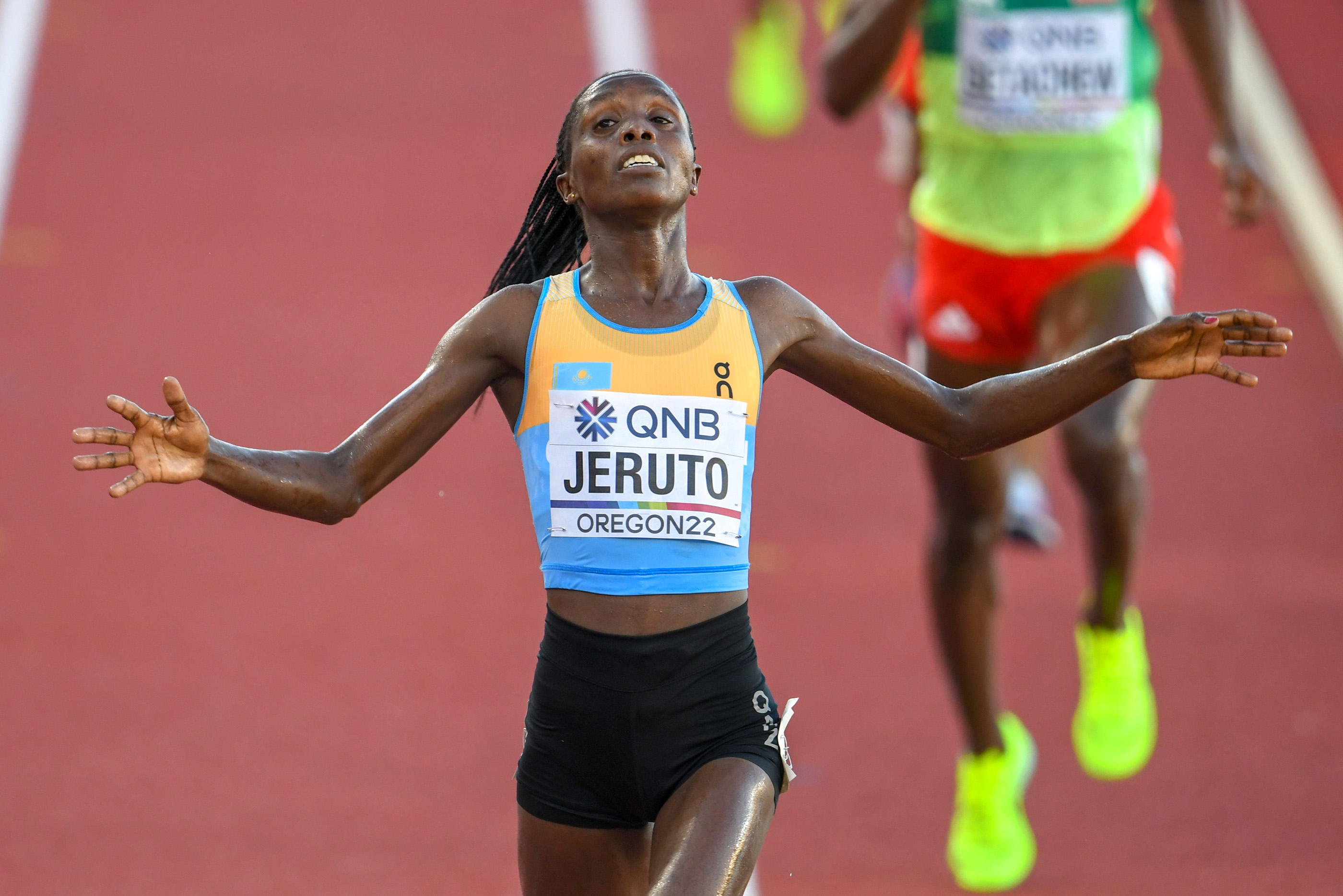
- Norah Jeruto after winning the final.
- Venue: Hayward Field
- Dates: 16 July (heats); 20 July (final)
- Competitors: 45 from 25 nations
- Winning time: 8:53.02

Medalists
gold medal	Norah Jeruto	Kazakhstan
silver medal	Werkuha Getachew	Ethiopia
bronze medal	Mekides Abebe	Ethiopia

The women's 3000 metres steeplechase at the 2022 World Athletics Championships was held at the Hayward Field in Eugene on 16 and 20 July 2022.

== Summary ==
With 3 of the last four World Championships (and the last 15 Men's) were born in Kenya. Kenyan dominance in the steeplechase is expected, particularly in Kenya. Returning champion, world record holder Beatrice Chepkoech didn't return due to injury, two of their representatives did not make it out of the heats, leaving only #6 of all time Celliphine Chespol to wear their uniform. However two additional Kenyan born runners were representing other countries; #4 of all time Winfred Yavi representing Bahrain and #3 of all time Norah Jeruto recently becoming eligible to run for Kazakhstan. The poaching of international free agent athletes has been quite an issue World Athletics has been trying to deal with. World Athletics blocked eligibility transfers in an attempt to revise the rules.

In the first heat, Jeruto ran an impressive, but unnecessary 9:01.54, the #26 time in history simply to be the leading qualifier. Ten seconds behind her Marwa Bouzayani, wearing a hijab uniform was an automatic qualifier.

In the final, Jeruto went to the front off the line, tracked immediately by Yavi. The pack strung out to single file, with 2017 champion, returning silver medalist Emma Coburn, Olympic gold medalist Peruth Chemutai, Mekides Abebe and Werkuha Getachew latching onto the front of that train. By three laps, that group had separated from the rest of the pack, the approximate 1K mark reached in 2:57. On the next lap, Yavi moved to the front, still pushing the pace. Only Jeruto and Getachew could hold on, the second kilometer covered in 3:01. Abebe was still hanging on 6 metres behind the leading three, trying to bridge back to the front. Over the penultimate lap, Abebe managed to get back to the group just before the bell. At the sound of the bell, Yavi edged back in front of Jeruto, but Jeruto would have none of that, reclaiming the lead halfway into the turn. With Yavi on the outside, Getachew took the inside track to come closer to Jeruto down the backstretch. Coming into the water jump, Yavi made another run at the lead, with Jeruto looking at her. Jeruto took the water jump cleanly, leaping to a 2 metre lead, Yavi took it awkwardly, stopping before taking the final step out of the water, with both Ethiopians passing her in the process. From there Jeruto expanded her lead, with Getachew then Abebe following her home. Yavi took the final barrier poorly and the fight for a medal was over.

Jeruto's 8:53.02 was the Championship record and the #3 time ever run, still less than a second faster than she had run a year earlier on this same track at the Prefontaine Classic. Getachew's 8:54.61 moved her to the #4 position in history, with Abebe's 8:56.08 putting her in #5.

== Records ==
Before the competition records were as follows:

Record	Athlete & Nat.	Perf.	Location	Date
World record	Beatrice Chepkoech (KEN)	8:44.32	Monte Carlo, Monaco	20 July 2018
Championship record	Beatrice Chepkoech (KEN)	8:57.84	Doha, Qatar	30 September 2019
World Leading	Winfred Mutile Yavi (BHR)	8:56.55	Paris, France	18 June 2022
African Record	Beatrice Chepkoech (KEN)	8:44.32	Monte Carlo, Monaco	20 July 2018
Asian Record	Ruth Jebet (BHR)	8:52.78	Paris, France	27 August 2016
North, Central American and Caribbean record	Courtney Frerichs (USA)	8:57.77	Eugene, United States	21 August 2021
South American Record	Tatiane da Silva (BRA)	9:24.38	Watford, Great Britain	11 June 2022
European Record	Gulnara Samitova-Galkina (RUS)	8:58.81	Beijing, China	17 August 2008
Oceanian record	Genevieve Lacaze (AUS)	9:14.28	Paris, France	27 August 2016

== Qualification standard ==
The standard to qualify automatically for entry was 9:30.00.

== Schedule ==
The event schedule, in local time (UTC−7), was as follows:

Date	Time	Round
16 July	10:35	Heats
20 July	19:45	Final

== Results ==
=== Heats ===
The first 3 athletes in each heat (Q) and the next 6 fastest (q) qualified to the final.

Rank	Heat	Name	Nationality	Time	Notes
1	1	Norah Jeruto	Kazakhstan	9:01.54	Q
2	1	Werkuha Getachew	Ethiopia	9:11.25	Q
3	1	Marwa Bouzayani	Tunisia	9:12.14	Q, PB
4	2	Alice Finot	France	9:14.34	Q, NR
5	2	Mekides Abebe	Ethiopia	9:14.83	Q
6	2	Luiza Gega	Albania	9:14.91	Q
7	2	Courtney Wayment	United States	9:14.95	q
8	1	Emma Coburn	United States	9:15.19	q
9	2	Peruth Chemutai	Uganda	9:16.66	q
10	3	Celliphine Chepteek Chespol	Kenya	9:16.78	Q
11	3	Maruša Mišmaš-Zrimšek	Slovenia	9:17.14	Q, SB
12	3	Winfred Mutile Yavi	Bahrain	9:17.32	Q
13	3	Courtney Frerichs	United States	9:17.91	q
14	2	Aimee Pratt	Great Britain & N.I.	9:18.91	q, NR
15	2	Gesa Felicitas Krause	Germany	9:21.02	q, SB
16	3	Sembo Almayew	Ethiopia	9:21.10	
17	2	Amy Cashin	Australia	9:21.46	PB
18	2	Chiara Scherrer	Switzerland	9:22.15	
19	3	Daisy Jepkemei	Kazakhstan	9:23.07	
20	1	Elizabeth Bird	Great Britain & N.I.	9:23.17	
21	2	Irene Sánchez-Escribano	Spain	9:23.94	PB
22	3	Nataliya Strebkova	Ukraine	9:25.85	
23	3	Tatiane Raquel da Silva	Brazil	9:26.25	
24	2	Purity Kirui	Kenya	9:26.88	SB
25	1	Jackline Chepkoech	Kenya	9:27.50	
26	3	Carolina Robles	Spain	9:28.24	PB
27	1	Belén Casetta	Argentina	9:29.05	SB
28	1	Lea Meyer	Germany	9:30.81	
29	3	Ceili McCabe	Canada	9:32.73	
30	1	Regan Yee	Canada	9:36.22	
31	2	Parul Chaudhary	India	9:38.09	PB
32	1	Xu Shuangshuang	China	9:39.17	SB
33	1	Brielle Erbacher	Australia	9:40.55	
34	3	Cara Feain-Ryan	Australia	9:43.41	
35	3	Adva Cohen	Israel	9:44.74	
36	3	Kinga Królik	Poland	9:44.74	
37	2	Grace Fetherstonhaugh	Canada	9:49.85	
38	1	Simone Ferraz	Brazil	9:53.52	
39	1	Nilani Rathnayaka	Sri Lanka	9:54.10	
40	3	Reimi Yoshimura	Japan	9:58.07	
41	2	Carolina Lozano	Argentina	10:03.51	
42	1	Yuno Yamanaka	Japan	10:18.18	

=== Final ===
The final was started on 20 July at 19:45.

Rank	Name	Nationality	Time	Notes
1st place, gold medalist(s)	Norah Jeruto	Kazakhstan	8:53.02	CR, NR
2nd place, silver medalist(s)	Werkuha Getachew	Ethiopia	8:54.61	NR
3rd place, bronze medalist(s)	Mekides Abebe	Ethiopia	8:56.08	PB
4	Winfred Mutile Yavi	Bahrain	9:01.31	
5	Luiza Gega	Albania	9:10.04	NR
6	Courtney Frerichs	United States	9:10.59	SB
7	Aimee Pratt	Great Britain & N.I.	9:15.64	NR
8	Emma Coburn	United States	9:16.49	
9	Marwa Bouzayani	Tunisia	9:20.92	
10	Alice Finot	France	9:21.40	
11	Peruth Chemutai	Uganda	9:21.93	
12	Courtney Wayment	United States	9:22.37	
13	Celliphine Chepteek Chespol	Kenya	9:27.34	
14	Maruša Mišmaš-Zrimšek	Slovenia	9:40.78	
15	Gesa Felicitas Krause	Germany	9:52.66	
