= 2022 World Athletics Championships – Women's 5000 metres =

Women's 5000 metres at the 2022 World Championships
- Venue: Hayward Field
- Dates: 20 July (heats); 23 July (final)
- Competitors: 41 from 23 nations
- Winning time: 14:46.29

Medalists
| gold medal | Gudaf Tsegay | Ethiopia |
| silver medal | Beatrice Chebet | Kenya |
| bronze medal | Dawit Seyaum | Ethiopia |

Video on YouTube Official Video

The women's 5000 metres at the 2022 World Athletics Championships was held at the Hayward Field in Eugene from 20 to 23 July 2022.

== Summary ==
Prior to this race, several competitors had previously raced Olympic Champion Sifan Hassan, who was known for her strong finishing kick. However, Hassan had been beaten days earlier in the 10,000 metres by Letesenbet Gidey, the world record holder in both the 5,000 metre and the 10,000 metre events.

The final took off at a pedestrian pace, Gidey's Ethiopian teammate Dawit Seyaum took the field through a couple of 80 second laps. The third Ethiopian was 1500 silver medalist Gudaf Tsegay. She knew that was not going to take the sting out of Hassan and moved things up with a couple of 69 second laps. Gidey joined the party, the two pushing 70 and 71 second laps until there was a lap and a half to go. Athletes continued to drop off the back of the lead pack. By this point, the lead pack consisted of the three Ethiopians, two Kenyans; Beatrice Chebet and returning silver medalist, Margaret Kipkemboi, and Kenyan ex-pat Caroline Chepkoech Kipkirui, newly allowed to run for Kazakhstan. Lurking on the back of the pack was Hassan, but now was go time. Around the turn, Hassan stepped to the outside and gently moved forward. After tangling elbows with Kipkirui, she floated up to Tsegay's shoulder at the bell. Around the turn, Chebet sensed the move and ran around the outside to take Tsegay's shoulder, effectively blocking Hassan. Tsegay drifted out to increase Chebet's running distance, Hassan looking for somewhere to run, darted to the rail and accelerated taking the lead with a little over 200m to go. Tsegay and Chebet would not let her go, three abreast across the track in the final turn, at one point Tsegay slapping Chebet's elbow out of her way, with Seyaum and Gidey just a step behind. As they hit the home stretch, Tsegay took the lead. Hassan looked back over her shoulder, a clear indication she was not going to challenge forward. Tsegay and Chebet sprinted for home, Tsegay opening up almost a 3-metre lead by the finish for gold, her final lap just under 60 seconds. Seyaum went into her kick to pass Hassan, following Chebet home for bronze.

== Records ==
Before the competition records were as follows:

| Record | Athlete & Nat. | Perf. | Location | Date |
|---|---|---|---|---|
| World record | Letesenbet Gidey (ETH) | 14:06.62 | Valencia, Spain | 7 October 2020 |
| Championship record | Hellen Obiri (KEN) | 14:26.72 | Doha, Qatar | 5 October 2019 |
| World Leading | Ejgayehu Taye (ETH) | 14:12.98 | Eugene, United States | 27 May 2022 |
| African Record | Letesenbet Gidey (ETH) | 14:06.62 | Valencia, Spain | 7 October 2020 |
| Asian Record | Bo Jiang (CHN) | 14:28.09 | Shanghai, China | 23 October 1997 |
| North, Central American and Caribbean record | Shelby Houlihan (USA) | 14:23.92 | Portland, United States | 10 July 2020 |
| South American Record | Simone Alves da Silva (BRA) | 15:18.85 | São Paulo, Brazil | 20 May 2011 |
| European Record | Sifan Hassan (NED) | 14:22.12 | London, Great Britain | 21 July 2019 |
| Oceanian record | Kimberley Smith (NZL) | 14:39.89 | New York, United States | 27 February 2009 |

== Qualification standard ==
The standard to qualify automatically for entry was 15:10.00.

== Schedule ==
The event schedule, in local time (UTC−7), was as follows:

| Date | Time | Round |
|---|---|---|
| 20 July | 16:25 | Heats |
| 23 July | 18:25 | Final |

== Results ==
=== Heats ===
The first 5 athletes in each heat (Q) and the next 5 fastest (q) qualify for the final.

| Rank | Heat | Name | Nationality | Time | Notes |
|---|---|---|---|---|---|
| 1 | 2 | Letesenbet Gidey | Ethiopia | 14:52.27 | Q |
| 2 | 2 | Caroline Chepkoech Kipkirui | Kazakhstan | 14:52.54 | Q, SB |
| 3 | 1 | Gudaf Tsegay | Ethiopia | 14:52.64 | Q |
| 4 | 2 | Sifan Hassan | Netherlands | 14:52.89 | Q, SB |
| 5 | 1 | Dawit Seyaum | Ethiopia | 14:53.06 | Q |
| 6 | 2 | Karoline Bjerkeli Grøvdal | Norway | 14:53.07 | Q |
| 7 | 2 | Elise Cranny | United States | 14:53.20 | Q |
| 8 | 1 | Beatrice Chebet | Kenya | 14:53.34 | Q, SB |
| 9 | 1 | Margaret Chelimo Kipkemboi | Kenya | 14:53.45 | Q, SB |
| 10 | 2 | Gloria Kite | Kenya | ~~14:53.62~~ | q, SB |
| 11 | 1 | Karissa Schweizer | United States | 14:53.69 | Q, SB |
| 12 | 2 | Eilish McColgan | Great Britain & N.I. | 14:56.47 | q, SB |
| 13 | 2 | Jessica Judd | Great Britain & N.I. | 14:57.64 | q |
| 14 | 2 | Nozomi Tanaka | Japan | 15:00.21 | q, SB |
| 15 | 1 | Emily Infeld | United States | 15:00.98 | q, SB |
| 16 | 1 | Ririka Hironaka | Japan | 15:02.03 | SB |
| 17 | 2 | Alina Reh | Germany | 15:13.92 | |
| 18 | 2 | Laura Galván | Mexico | 15:15.92 | |
| 19 | 1 | Konstanze Klosterhalfen | Germany | 15:17.78 | |
| 20 | 2 | Mariana Machado | Portugal | 15:18.09 | PB |
| 21 | 1 | Maureen Koster | Netherlands | 15:18.17 | |
| 22 | 1 | Sarah Lahti | Sweden | 15:26.05 | |
| 23 | 2 | Esther Chebet | Uganda | 15:26.40 | |
| 24 | 1 | Rahel Daniel | Eritrea | 15:31.03 | |
| 25 | 1 | Amy-Eloise Markovc | Great Britain & N.I. | 15:31.62 | SB |
| 26 | 2 | Selamawit Teferi | Israel | 15:44.30 | SB |
| 27 | 2 | Rose Davies | Australia | 15:45.95 | |
| 28 | 1 | Caster Semenya | South Africa | 15:46.12 | |
| 29 | 2 | Joselyn Daniely Brea | Venezuela | 15:46.75 | SB |
| 30 | 1 | Kaede Hagitani | Japan | 15:53.39 | |
| 31 | 2 | Parul Chaudhary | India | 15:54.03 | |
| 32 | 1 | Florencia Borelli | Argentina | 16:06.36 | |
| 33 | 2 | Sara Benfares | Germany | 16:34.23 | |
| 34 | 1 | Edymar Brea | Venezuela | 16:41.32 | |
| 35 | 2 | Gracelyn Larkin | Canada | 16:48.78 | |
| | 1 | Camilla Richardsson | Finland | | DNF |
| | 1 | Natalie Rule | Australia | | DNF |

=== Final ===
| Rank | Name | Nationality | Time | Notes |
|---|---|---|---|---|
| 1st place, gold medalist(s) | Gudaf Tsegay | Ethiopia | 14:46.29 | |
| 2nd place, silver medalist(s) | Beatrice Chebet | Kenya | 14:46.75 | SB |
| 3rd place, bronze medalist(s) | Dawit Seyaum | Ethiopia | 14:47.36 | |
| 4 | Margaret Chelimo Kipkemboi | Kenya | 14:47.71 | SB |
| 5 | Letesenbet Gidey | Ethiopia | 14:47.98 | |
| 6 | Sifan Hassan | Netherlands | 14:48.12 | SB |
| 7 | Caroline Chepkoech Kipkirui | Kazakhstan | 14:54.80 | |
| 8 | Karoline Bjerkeli Grøvdal | Norway | 14:57.62 | |
| 9 | Elise Cranny | United States | 14:59.99 | |
| 10 | Eilish McColgan | Great Britain & N.I. | 15:03.03 | |
| 11 | Nozomi Tanaka | Japan | 15:19.35 | |
| 12 | Jessica Judd | Great Britain & N.I. | 15:19.88 | |
| 13 | Emily Infeld | United States | 15:29.03 | |
| - | Karissa Schweizer | United States | DNF | |
| - | Gloria Kite | Kenya | ~~15:01.22~~ | DQ |
