= 2022 World Athletics Championships – Women's 1500 metres =

Women's 1500 metres at the 2022 World Championships
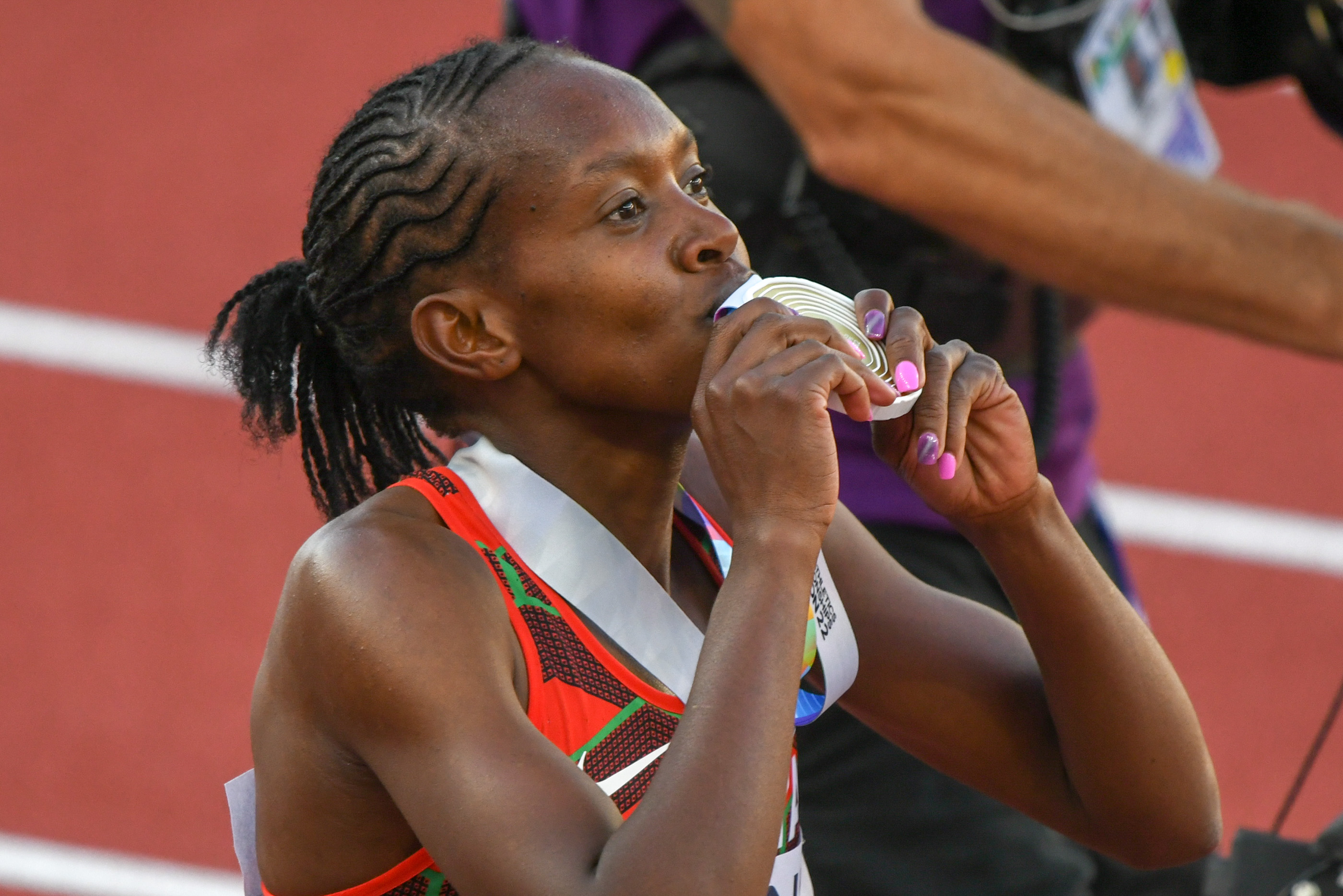
- Faith Kipyegon shortly after the final.
- Venue: Hayward Field
- Dates: 15 July (heats); 16 July (semi-finals); 18 July (final)
- Competitors: 46 from 24 nations
- Winning time: 3:52.96

Medalists
gold medal	Faith Kipyegon	Kenya
silver medal	Gudaf Tsegay	Ethiopia
bronze medal	Laura Muir	Great Britain

The women's 1500 metres at the 2022 World Athletics Championships was held at the Hayward Field in Eugene from 15 to 18 July 2022.

== Summary ==
Gudaf Tsegay took the lead soon after the start with only her Ethiopian teammate Hirut Meshesha, Olympic Champion Faith Kipyegon and Olympic silver medalist Laura Muir following closely with a gap opening quickly back to the rest. The first lap was completed in an electric 55.12 seconds with the first four maintaining a gap over the rest of the field until the end of the second lap, completed in 68 seconds, when Meshesha dropped off the first three, who now looked like confirmed medallists after only 800 metres. Tsegay still led at the bell with Kipyegon only taking the lead halfway down the back straight on the last lap. Kipyegon extended her lead over Tsegay to almost 10 metres by the finish with another five metres back to Muir in third.

== Records ==
Before the competition records were as follows:

Record	Athlete & Nat.	Perf.	Location	Date
World record	Genzebe Dibaba (ETH)	3:50.07	Monte Carlo, Monaco	17 July 2015
Championship record	Sifan Hassan (NED)	3:51.95	Doha, Qatar	5 October 2019
World Leading	Faith Kipyegon (KEN)	3:52.59	Eugene, United States	28 May 2022
African Record	Genzebe Dibaba (ETH)	3:50.07	Monte Carlo, Monaco	17 July 2015
Asian Record	Qu Yunxia (CHN)	3:50.46	Beijing, China	11 September 1993
North, Central American and Caribbean record	Shelby Houlihan (USA)	3:54.99	Doha, Qatar	5 October 2019
South American Record	Letitia Vriesde (SUR)	4:05.67	Tokyo, Japan	31 August 1991
European Record	Sifan Hassan (NED)	3:51.95	Doha, Qatar	5 October 2019
Oceanian record	Jessica Hull (AUS)	3:58.81	Tokyo, Japan	4 August 2021

== Qualification standard ==
The standard to qualify automatically for entry was 4:04.20.

== Schedule ==
The event schedule, in local time (UTC−7), was as follows:

Date	Time	Round
15 July	18:10	Heats
16 July	19:05	Semi-finals
18 July	19:50	Final

== Results ==
=== Heats ===
The first 6 athletes in each heat (Q) and the next 6 fastest (q) qualify for the heats.

Rank	Heat	Name	Nationality	Time	Notes
1	3	Gudaf Tsegay	Ethiopia	4:02.68	Q
2	3	Winny Chebet	Kenya	4:03.12	Q, SB
3	3	Linden Hall	Australia	4:03.21	Q
4	3	Sofia Ennaoui	Poland	4:03.52	Q, SB
5	3	Katharina Trost	Germany	4:03.53	Q, PB
6	3	Cory Ann McGee	United States	4:03.61	Q
7	3	Winnie Nanyondo	Uganda	4:03.81	q
8	2	Faith Kipyegon	Kenya	4:04.53	Q
9	2	Jessica Hull	Australia	4:04.68	Q
10	2	Freweyni Hailu	Ethiopia	4:04.85	Q
11	2	Elle St. Pierre	United States	4:04.94	Q
12	2	Hanna Klein	Germany	4:05.13	Q
13	2	Adelle Tracey	Jamaica	4:05.14	Q
14	2	Nozomi Tanaka	Japan	4:05.30	q, SB
15	2	Marta Pérez	Spain	4:05.92	q, SB
16	2	Hanna Hermansson	Sweden	4:06.30	q, PB
17	3	Diana Mezuliáníková	Czech Republic	4:06.55	q, SB
18	2	Katie Snowden	Great Britain & N.I.	4:06.92	q
19	1	Hirut Meshesha	Ethiopia	4:07.05	Q
20	3	Edinah Jebitok	Kenya	4:07.12	
21	2	Laura Galván	Mexico	4:07.25	
22	2	Sintayehu Vissa	Italy	4:07.33	
23	2	Natalia Hawthorn	Canada	4:07.37	
24	1	Laura Muir	Great Britain & N.I.	4:07.53	Q
25	1	Georgia Griffith	Australia	4:07.65	Q
26	1	Sinclaire Johnson	United States	4:07.68	Q
27	1	Gaia Sabbatini	Italy	4:07.82	Q
28	3	Federica Del Buono	Italy	4:08.42	
29	1	Kristiina Mäki	Czech Republic	4:08.43	Q
30	1	Marta Pen Freitas	Portugal	4:08.58	
31	3	Melissa Courtney-Bryant	Great Britain & N.I.	4:09.07	
32	1	Yolanda Ngarambe	Sweden	4:09.15	
33	1	Judith Kiyeng	Kenya	4:09.30	
34	1	Lucia Stafford	Canada	4:09.67	
35	1	Elise Vanderelst	Belgium	4:10.45	
36	1	Sarah Healy	Ireland	4:11.31	
37	3	Nathalie Blomqvist	Finland	4:11.98	
38	1	Şilan Ayyildiz	Turkey	4:12.67	
39	3	Alma Delia Cortes	Mexico	4:13.92	
40	1	Ran Urabe	Japan	4:14.82	
41	3	Gresa Bakraçi	Kosovo	4:22.77	
42	2	Anjelina Lohalith	Athlete Refugee Team	4:23.84	NR

=== Semi-finals ===
The first 5 athletes in each heat (Q) and the next 2 fastest (q) qualify for the final.

Rank	Heat	Name	Nationality	Time	Notes
1	1	Gudaf Tsegay	Ethiopia	4:01.28	Q
2	1	Laura Muir	Great Britain & N.I.	4:01.78	Q, SB
3	1	Jessica Hull	Australia	4:01.81	Q
4	1	Freweyni Hailu	Ethiopia	4:02.28	Q
5	1	Cory Ann McGee	United States	4:02.74	Q
6	1	Winny Chebet	Kenya	4:03.08	q, SB
7	2	Faith Kipyegon	Kenya	4:03.98	Q
8	2	Hirut Meshesha	Ethiopia	4:04.05	Q
9	1	Marta Pérez	Spain	4:04.24	q, SB
10	2	Sinclaire Johnson	United States	4:04.51	Q
11	1	Hanna Klein	Germany	4:04.62	
12	1	Linden Hall	Australia	4:04.65	
13	2	Georgia Griffith	Australia	4:05.16	Q
14	2	Sofia Ennaoui	Poland	4:05.17	Q
15	2	Nozomi Tanaka	Japan	4:05.79	
16	2	Katharina Trost	Germany	4:05.85	
17	1	Hanna Hermansson	Sweden	4:06.70	
18	2	Adelle Tracey	Jamaica	4:06.96	
19	1	Diana Mezuliáníková	Czech Republic	4:07.62	
20	2	Katie Snowden	Great Britain & N.I.	4:08.29	
21	1	Elle St. Pierre	United States	4:09.84	
22	2	Kristiina Mäki	Czech Republic	4:21.67	
23	2	Winnie Nanyondo	Uganda	DNF	qR
	2	Gaia Sabbatini	Italy	DQ	TR17.2.2

=== Final ===
The final was started on 18 July at 19:50.

Rank	Lane	Name	Nationality	Time	Notes
1st place, gold medalist(s)	1	Faith Kipyegon	Kenya	3:52.96	
2nd place, silver medalist(s)	4	Gudaf Tsegay	Ethiopia	3:54.52	
3rd place, bronze medalist(s)	2	Laura Muir	Great Britain & N.I.	3:55.28	SB
4	6	Freweyni Hailu	Ethiopia	4:01.28	
5	3	Sofia Ennaoui	Poland	4:01.43	SB
6	8	Sinclaire Johnson	United States	4:01.63	
7	12	Jessica Hull	Australia	4:01.82	
8	5	Winnie Nanyondo	Uganda	4:01.98	
9	13	Georgia Griffith	Australia	4:03.26	
10	10	Cory Ann McGee	United States	4:03.70	
11	7	Marta Pérez	Spain	4:04.25	
12	9	Hirut Meshesha	Ethiopia	4:05.86	
13	11	Winny Chebet	Kenya	4:15.13	
