= 2022 World Athletics Championships – Men's 5000 metres =

Men's 5000 metres at the 2022 World Championships
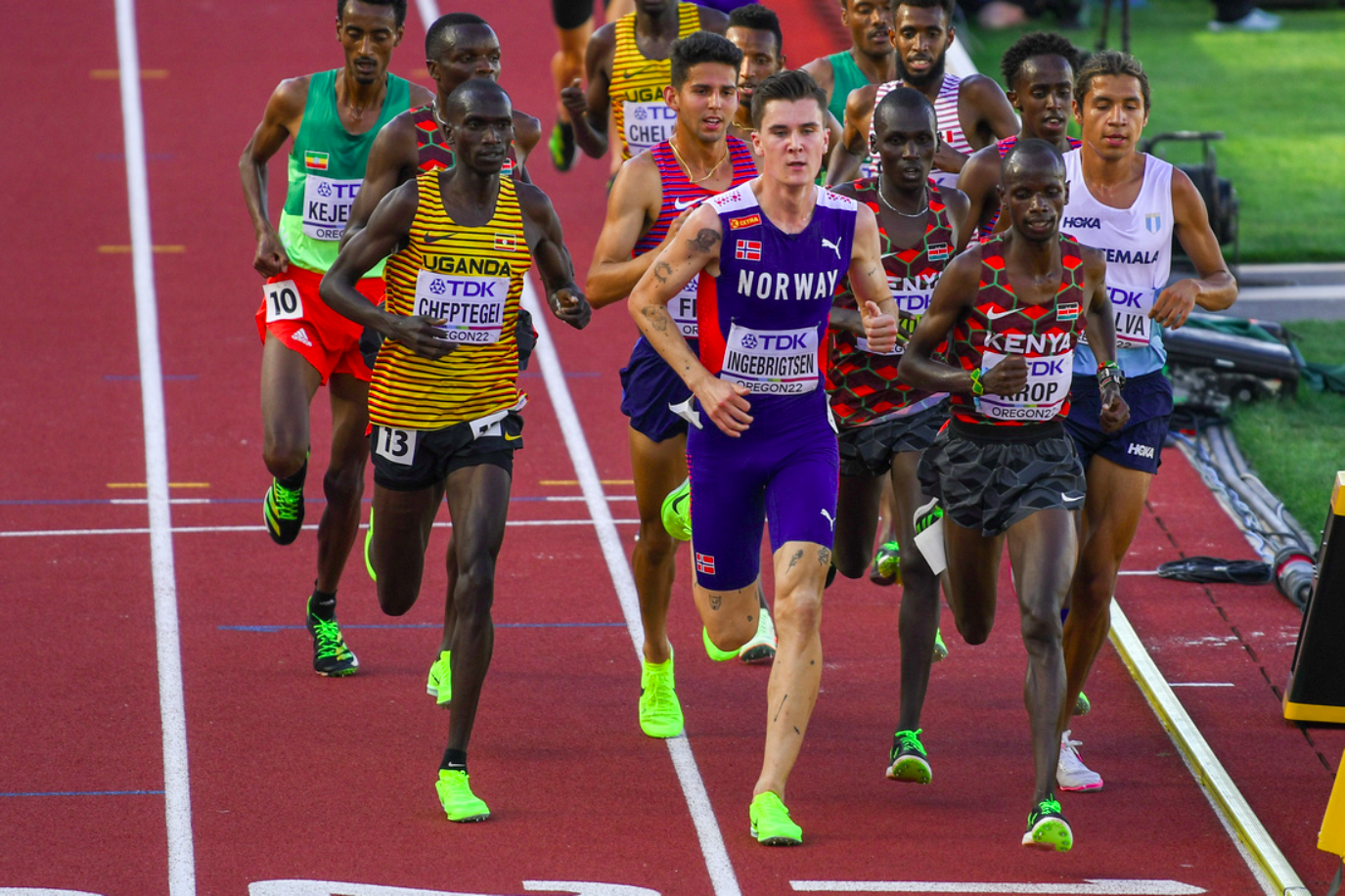
- Venue: Hayward Field
- Dates: 21 July (heats); 24 July (final)
- Competitors: 48 from 26 nations
- Winning time: 13:09.24

Medalists
gold medal	Jakob Ingebrigtsen	Norway
silver medal	Jacob Krop	Kenya
bronze medal	Oscar Chelimo	Uganda

Video on YouTube Official Video

The men's 5000 metres at the 2022 World Athletics Championships was held at the Hayward Field in Eugene from 21 to 24 July 2022.

== Summary ==
The podium from the previous championships all returned. Muktar Edris was now ranked #13 in the world, Selemon Barega #3 and Mohammed Ahmed #4. Olympic Champion and world record holder Joshua Cheptegei was #1. And there was Jakob Ingebrigtsen with no ranking at all and a chip on his shoulder after losing the 1500 earlier in the Championships.

From the start, Cheptegei went to the front to control the race. He was marked by Luis Grijalva, Jacob Krop and Grant Fisher through three 62 second laps. Then Cheptegei let off the gas, the Kenyans decided to move forward, Krop taking the point, Nicholas Kipkorir dropped in behind him, Daniel Ebenyo came along the outside of the pack to join them. But the pace dropped to 65 second laps. Grijalva and Cheptegei both made minor attempts to displace one of the Kenyans but they would have none of that. After 5 laps, Kipkorir took the lead while Krop dropped back, then he dropped back a little more and the roadblock was broken. Meanwhile, Ingebrigtsen made a leisurely jog along the outside to join the front group, taking a wide detour out to lane 4 for water, only joined by Cheptegei and Edris before dropping in next to Grijalva behind Kipkorir. For the next four laps, the Kenyan cast of leaders kept changing as one would drop back into the pack then rush back to the front while another would drop back. With a kilometer to go, Ingebrigtsen took a shift at the front. Krop made one more effort to take the lead, but no, Ingebrigtsen felt he wanted to be there and would not let him pass again keeping Krop to the outside as the pace got faster and faster. Down the final backstretch, Fisher worked his way past Kipkorir into third, with Ahmed behind him. Through the final turn, Ingebrigtsen separated from the pack and after he had 7 metres, looking back to make sure there was no trouble coming to take his easy win. Behind him, Krop moved to the rail through the turn. With Ahmed passing on his outside, Fisher stepped on the rail with 120 metres to go, losing his balance and momentum. Ahmed and Oscar Chelimo went by, then Grijalva moving faster than any of them. In lane 3, Chelimo ran past Ahmed, who strained for the finish line. As he dived for the finish, Grijalva pipped him for fourth but his closing speed couldn't catch Chelimo.

== Records ==
Before the competition records were as follows:

Record	Athlete & Nat.	Perf.	Location	Date
World record	Joshua Cheptegei (UGA)	12:35.36	Monte Carlo, Monaco	14 August 2020
Championship record	Eliud Kipchoge (KEN)	12:52.79	Saint-Denis, France	31 August 2003
World Leading	Nicholas Kipkorir Kimeli (KEN)	12:46.33	Rome, Italy	9 June 2022
African Record	Joshua Cheptegei (UGA)	12:35.36	Monte Carlo, Monaco	14 August 2020
Asian Record	Albert Rop (BHR)	12:51.96	Monte Carlo, Monaco	19 July 2013
North, Central American and Caribbean record	Mohammed Ahmed (CAN)	12:47.20	Portland, United States	10 July 2020
South American Record	Marílson Gomes dos Santos (BRA)	13:19.43	Kassel, Germany	8 June 2006
European Record	Jakob Ingebrigtsen (NOR)	12:48.45	Florence, Italy	10 June 2021
Oceanian record	Craig Mottram (AUS)	12:55.76	London, Great Britain	30 July 2004

== Qualification standard ==
The standard to qualify automatically for entry was 13:13.50.

== Schedule ==
The event schedule, in local time (UTC−7), was as follows:

Date	Time	Round
21 July	18:10	Heats
24 July	18:05	Final

== Results ==
=== Heats ===
The first 5 athletes in each heat (Q) and the next 5 fastest (q) qualify for the final.

Rank	Heat	Name	Nationality	Time	Notes
1	2	Jacob Krop	Kenya	13:13.30	Q
2	2	Jakob Ingebrigtsen	Norway	13:13.92	Q
3	2	Luis Grijalva	Guatemala	13:14.04	Q, SB
4	2	Yomif Kejelcha	Ethiopia	13:14.87	Q
5	2	Mohammed Ahmed	Canada	13:15.17	Q
6	2	Daniel Ebenyo	Kenya	13:15.17	q
7	2	Muktar Edris	Ethiopia	13:21.19	q
8	2	Marc Scott	Great Britain & N.I.	13:22.54	q
9	1	Oscar Chelimo	Uganda	13:24.24	Q
10	1	Grant Fisher	United States	13:24.44	Q
11	1	Selemon Barega	Ethiopia	13:24.44	Q
12	1	Joshua Cheptegei	Uganda	13:24.47	Q
13	1	Abdihamid Nur	United States	13:24.48	Q
14	2	Sam Parsons	Germany	13:24.50	q
15	1	Nicholas Kimeli	Kenya	13:24.56	q
16	1	Telahun Haile Bekele	Ethiopia	13:24.77	
17	2	Merhawi Mebrahtu	Eritrea	13:24.89	
18	2	William Kincaid	United States	13:25.02	
19	1	Ky Robinson	Australia	13:27.03	
20	1	Andrew Butchart	Great Britain & N.I.	13:31.26	SB
21	1	Sam Atkin	Great Britain & N.I.	13:34.36	
22	1	Adel Mechaal	Spain	13:36.48	
23	1	Geordie Beamish	New Zealand	13:36.86	
24	1	Narve Gilje Nordås	Norway	13:37.14	
25	2	Hamish Carson	New Zealand	13:37.62	
26	1	Soufiyan Bouqantar	Morocco	13:37.69	
27	1	Charles Philibert-Thiboutot	Canada	13:38.80	
28	1	Maximilian Thorwirth	Germany	13:43.02	
29	1	Altobeli da Silva	Brazil	13:43.80	SB
30	1	Adriaan Wildschutt	South Africa	13:44.32	
31	2	Hyuga Endo	Japan	13:47.07	
32	2	Peter Maru	Uganda	13:47.65	
33	1	Mohamed Mohumed	Germany	13:52.00	
34	2	Lesiba Precious Mashele	South Africa	13:52.37	
35	2	Matthew Ramsden	Australia	13:52.90	
36	1	Jamal Abdelmaji Eisa Mohammed	Athlete Refugee Team	14:02.79	SB
37	2	Hicham Akankam	Morocco	14:05.11	
38	2	Yaseen Abdalla	Sudan	14:15.59	
39	1	Nursultan Keneshbekov	Kyrgyzstan	14:15.59	
40	2	Kieran Tuntivate	Thailand	14:19.28	
41	2	Jethro Saint-Fleur	Aruba	16:04.46	PB
	2	Ali Hissein Mahamat	Chad (CHA)		DNS

=== Final ===
The final was started on 24 July at 18:05.

Rank	Name	Nationality	Time	Notes
1st place, gold medalist(s)	Jakob Ingebrigtsen	Norway	13:09.24	
2nd place, silver medalist(s)	Jacob Krop	Kenya	13:09.98	
3rd place, bronze medalist(s)	Oscar Chelimo	Uganda	13:10.20	SB
4	Luis Grijalva	Guatemala	13:10.44	SB
5	Mohammed Ahmed	Canada	13:10.46	
6	Grant Fisher	United States	13:11.65	
7	Nicholas Kimeli	Kenya	13:11.97	
8	Yomif Kejelcha	Ethiopia	13:12.09	
9	Joshua Cheptegei	Uganda	13:13.12	
10	Daniel Ebenyo	Kenya	13:16.64	
11	Abdihamid Nur	United States	13:18.05	
12	Selemon Barega	Ethiopia	13:19.62	
13	Muktar Edris	Ethiopia	13:24.67	
14	Marc Scott	Great Britain & N.I.	13:41.04	
15	Sam Parsons	Germany	13:45.89	
