= 2022 World Athletics Championships – Men's marathon =

Men's marathon at the 2022 World Championships
- Venue: Eugene, Oregon
- Dates: 17 July
- Competitors: 63 from 34 nations
- Winning time: 2:05:36

Medalists
gold medal	Tamirat Tola	Ethiopia
silver medal	Mosinet Geremew	Ethiopia
bronze medal	Bashir Abdi	Belgium

Video on YouTube Official Video highlights

The men's marathon at the 2022 World Athletics Championships was held in Eugene on 17 July 2022.

== Records ==
Before the competition records were as follows:

Record	Athlete & Nat.	Perf.	Location	Date
World record	Eliud Kipchoge (KEN)	2:01:39	Berlin, Germany	16 September 2018
Championship record	Abel Kirui (KEN)	2:06:54	Berlin, Germany	22 August 2009
World Leading	Eliud Kipchoge (KEN)	2:02:40	Tokyo, Japan	6 March 2022
African Record	Eliud Kipchoge (KEN)	2:01:39	Berlin, Germany	16 September 2018
Asian Record	El Hassan El Abbassi (BHR)	2:04:43	Valencia, Spain	2 December 2018
North, Central American and Caribbean record	Khalid Khannouchi (USA)	2:05:38	London, Great Britain	14 April 2002
South American Record	Daniel Ferreira do Nascimento (BRA)	2:04:51	Seoul, South Korea	17 April 2022
European Record	Bashir Abdi (BEL)	2:03:36	Rotterdam, Netherlands	24 October 2021
Oceanian record	Robert de Castella (AUS)	2:07:51	Boston, United States	21 April 1986

== Qualification standard ==
The standard to qualify automatically for entry was 2:11:30.

== Schedule ==
The event schedule, in local time (UTC−7), was as follows:

Date	Time	Round
17 July	06:15	Final

== Results ==
The final started on 17 July at 06:15.

Rank	Name	Nationality	Time	Notes
1st place, gold medalist(s)	Tamirat Tola	Ethiopia	2:05:36	CR
2nd place, silver medalist(s)	Mosinet Geremew	Ethiopia	2:06:44	
3rd place, bronze medalist(s)	Bashir Abdi	Belgium	2:06:48	
4	Cameron Levins	Canada	2:07:09	NR
5	Geoffrey Kamworor	Kenya	2:07:14	SB
6	Seifu Tura	Ethiopia	2:07:17	
7	Gabriel Geay	Tanzania	2:07:31	SB
8	Daniel Ferreira do Nascimento	Brazil	2:07:35	
9	Shumi Dechasa	Bahrain	2:07:52	SB
10	Isaac Mpofu	Zimbabwe	2:07:56	NR
11	Maru Teferi	Israel	2:07:59	
12	Othmane El Goumri	Morocco	2:08:14	
13	Yusuke Nishiyama	Japan	2:08:35	
14	Hamza Sahli	Morocco	2:08:45	
15	Barnabas Kiptum	Kenya	2:08:59	
16	Oqbe Kibrom Ruesom	Eritrea	2:09:02	
17	Hassan Chahdi	France	2:09:20	
18	Melikhaya Frans	South Africa	2:09:24	PB
19	Galen Rupp	United States	2:09:36	SB
20	Rory Linkletter	Canada	2:10:24	PB
21	Mohamed Reda El Aaraby	Morocco	2:10:33	
22	Goitom Kifle	Eritrea	2:11:10	SB
23	Dong Guojian	China	2:11:14	SB
24	Elkanah Kibet	United States	2:11:20	SB
25	Tesama Moogas	Israel	2:11:36	
26	Ser-Od Bat-Ochir	Mongolia	2:11:39	SB
27	José Márcio Leão da Silva	Brazil	2:11:43	
28	Ben Preisner	Canada	2:11:47	SB
29	Patricio Castillo	Mexico	2:11:51	SB
30	Thomas De Bock	Belgium	2:11:54	SB
31	Yang Shaohui	China	2:11:56	
32	Olivier Irabaruta	Burundi	2:12:00	
33	Jackson Kiprop	Uganda	2:12:14	
34	Filex Malewa Chemongesi	Uganda	2:12:16	
35	Tebello Ramakongoana	Lesotho	2:12:35	SB
36	Hector Garibay Flores	Bolivia	2:12:44	
37	Paulo Roberto Paula	Brazil	2:13:39	
38	Gaku Hoshi	Japan	2:13:44	
39	Nicolás Cuestas	Uruguay	2:13:52	
40	Fred Musobo	Uganda	2:13:58	SB
41	Eulalio Muñoz	Argentina	2:14:29	SB
42	Byambajav Tseveenravdan	Mongolia	2:14:44	
43	Tom Gröschel	Germany	2:14:56	SB
44	Hiskel Tewelde	Eritrea	2:15:01	SB
45	Peng Jianhua	China	2:16:12	SB
46	Colin Mickow	United States	2:16:36	SB
47	Thijs Nijhuis	Denmark	2:16:55	SB
48	Haimro Alame	Israel	2:17:05	
49	Josh Griffiths	Great Britain & N.I.	2:17:37	
50	Ernesto Andrés Zamora	Uruguay	2:17:54	
51	Dario Castro	Mexico	2:18:32	
52	Tumelo Motlagale	South Africa	2:20:21	
53	Eduardo Terrance Garcia	U.S. Virgin Islands	2:23:16	SB
54	Krishna Bahadur Basnet	Nepal	2:24:19	SB
	Lahsene Bouchikhi	Belgium	DNF	
	Gantulga Dambaddarjaa	Mongolia	DNF	
	Lelisa Desisa	Ethiopia	DNF	
	Oh Joo-han	South Korea	DNF	
	Ibrahim Hassan	Djibouti	DNF	
	Abdi Nageeye	Netherlands	DNF	
	David Nilsson	Sweden	DNF	
	Emanuel Giniki Gisamoda	Tanzania	DNF	
	Kengo Suzuki	Japan	DNS	
