= Ethiopia at the 2022 World Athletics Championships =

- Flag of Ethiopia
- WA code: ETH

in Eugene, United States 15 July 2022 – 24 July 2022
- Competitors: 40 (21 men and 19 women)
- Medals Ranked 2nd: Gold 4 Silver 4 Bronze 2 Total 10

World Athletics Championships appearances
- 1983; 1987; 1991; 1993; 1995; 1997; 1999; 2001; 2003; 2005; 2007; 2009; 2011; 2013; 2015; 2017; 2019; 2022; 2023; 2025

Ethiopia competed at the 2022 World Athletics Championships in Eugene, United States, from 15 to 24 July 2022.

== Medalists ==
Medal	Athlete	Event	Date
Gold	Letesenbet Gidey	10,000 metres	16 July
Gold	Tamirat Tola	Marathon	17 July
Gold	Gotytom Gebreslase	Marathon	18 July
Gold	Gudaf Tsegay	5,000 metres	23 July
Silver	Mosinet Geremew	Marathon	17 July
Silver	Lamecha Girma	3000 metres steeplechase	18 July
Silver	Gudaf Tsegay	1500 metres	18 July
Silver	Werkuha Getachew	3000 metres steeplechase	20 July
Bronze	Mekides Abebe	3000 metres steeplechase	20 July
Bronze	Dawit Seyaum	5,000 metres	23 July

== Results ==
Ethiopia entered 40 athletes.

Key

- Q = Qualified for the next round
- q = Qualified for the next round as a fastest loser or, in field events, by position without achieving the qualifying target
- NR = National record
- PB = Personal best
- SB = Season best
- N/A = Round not applicable for the event

=== Men ===
Track and road events

Athlete	Event	Heat		Semi-finals		Final	
Athlete	Event	Result	Rank	Result	Rank	Result	Rank
Tolesa Bodena	800 metres	1:45.81	14 Q	1:50.55	24	did not advance	
Ermias Girma	800 metres	1:49.36	38	did not advance			
Samuel Abate	1500 metres	3:40.77	36	did not advance			
Teddese Lemi	1500 metres	3:36.24	9 Q	3:35.04	4 Q	3:32.98	8
Samuel Tefera	1500 metres	3:36.35	10 Q	3:37.71	17	did not advance	
Berihu Aregawi	5000 metres	DNS		—		did not advance	
Selemon Barega	5000 metres	13:24.44	11 Q	—		13:19.62	12
Telahun Haile Bekele	5000 metres	13:24.77	16	did not advance			
Muktar Edris	5000 metres	13:21.19	7 q	—		13:24.67	13
Yomif Kejelcha	5000 metres	13:14.87	4 Q	—		13:12.09	8
Berihu Aregawi	10,000 metres	—				27:31.00	7
Selemon Barega	10,000 metres	—				27:28.39	5
Tadese Worku	10,000 metres	—				27:51.25	14
Lelisa Desisa	Marathon	—				DNF	
Mosinet Geremew	Marathon	—				2:06:44	2nd place, silver medalist(s)
Tamirat Tola	Marathon	—				2:05:36 CR	1st place, gold medalist(s)
Seifu Tura	Marathon	—				2:07:17	6
Hailemariyam Amare	3000 metres steeplechase	8:18.34	5 Q	—		8:31.54	10
Lamecha Girma	3000 metres steeplechase	8:19.64	10 Q	—		8:26.01	2nd place, silver medalist(s)
Getnet Wale	3000 metres steeplechase	8:17.49	4 q	—		8:28.68	4

=== Women ===
Track and road events

Athlete	Event	Heat		Semi-finals		Final	
Athlete	Event	Result	Rank	Result	Rank	Result	Rank
Habitam Alemu	800 metres	2:01.37	16 Q	2:00.37 SB	14	did not advance	
Freweyni Hailu	800 metres	2:00.93	10 Q	2:00.11	11	did not advance	
Diribe Welteji	800 metres	1:58.83	1 Q	1:58.16 PB	2 Q	1:57.02 PB	4
Freweyni Hailu	1500 metres	4:04.85	10 Q	4:02.28	4 Q	4:01.28	4
Hirut Meshesha	1500 metres	4:07.05	19 Q	4:04.05	8 Q	4:05.86	12
Gudaf Tsegay	1500 metres	4:02.68	1 Q	4:01.28	1 Q	3:54.52	2nd place, silver medalist(s)
Letesenbet Gidey	5000 metres	14:52.27	1 Q	—		14:47.98	5
Dawit Seyaum	5000 metres	14:53.06	5 Q	—		14:47.36	3rd place, bronze medalist(s)
Gudaf Tsegay	5000 metres	14:52.64	3 Q	—		14:46.29	1st place, gold medalist(s)
Letesenbet Gidey	10,000 metres	—				30:09.94 WL	1st place, gold medalist(s)
Bosena Mulatie	10,000 metres	—				30:17.77 PB	8
Ejgayehu Taye	10,000 metres	—				30:12.45 PB	6
Ashete Bekere	Marathon	—				DNF	
Gotytom Gebreslase	Marathon	—				2:18:11 CR	1st place, gold medalist(s)
Ababel Yeshaneh	Marathon	—				DNF	
Mekides Abebe	3000 metres steeplechase	9:14.83	5 Q	—		8:56.08 PB	3rd place, bronze medalist(s)
Sembo Almayew	3000 metres steeplechase	9:21.10	16	—		did not advance	
Werkuha Getachew	3000 metres steeplechase	9:11.25	2 Q	—		8:54.61 NR	2nd place, silver medalist(s)
