= 2022 World Athletics Championships – Women's marathon =

Women's marathon at the 2022 World Championships
- Venue: Hayward Field
- Dates: 18 July
- Competitors: 48 from 26 nations
- Winning time: 2:18:11

Medalists
gold medal	Gotytom Gebreslase	Ethiopia
silver medal	Judith Korir	Kenya
bronze medal	Lonah Chemtai Salpeter	Israel

The women's marathon at the 2022 World Athletics Championships was held at the Hayward Field in Eugene on 18 July 2022.

== Records ==
Before the competition records were as follows:

Record	Athlete & Nat.	Perf.	Location	Date
World record	Brigid Kosgei (KEN)	2:14:04	Chicago, United States	13 October 2019
Championship record	Paula Radcliffe (GBR)	2:20:57	Helsinki, Finland	14 August 2005
World Leading	Brigid Kosgei (KEN)	2:16:02	Tokyo, Japan	6 March 2022
African Record	Brigid Kosgei (KEN)	2:14:04	Chicago, United States	13 October 2019
Asian Record	Mizuki Noguchi (JPN)	2:19:12	Berlin, Germany	25 September 2005
North, Central American and Caribbean record	Keira D'Amato (USA)	2:19:12	Houston, United States	16 January 2022
South American Record	Gladys Tejeda (PER)	2:25:57	Seville, Spain	20 February 2022
European Record	Paula Radcliffe (GBR)	2:15:25	London, Great Britain	13 April 2003
Oceanian record	Benita Willis-Johnson (AUS)	2:22:36	Chicago, United States	22 October 2006

== Qualification standard ==
The standard to qualify automatically for entry was 2:29:30.

== Schedule ==
The event schedule, in local time (UTC−7), was as follows:

Date	Time	Round
18 July	06:15	Final

== Results ==
The final was started on 18 July at 06:15.

Rank	Name	Nationality	Time	Notes
1st place, gold medalist(s)	Gotytom Gebreslase	Ethiopia	2:18:11	CR
2nd place, silver medalist(s)	Judith Korir	Kenya	2:18:20	PB
3rd place, bronze medalist(s)	Lonah Chemtai Salpeter	Israel	2:20:18	
4	Nazret Weldu	Eritrea	2:20:29	NR
5	Sara Hall	United States	2:22:10	SB
6	Angela Tanui	Kenya	2:22:15	
7	Emma Bates	United States	2:23:18	PB
8	Keira D'Amato	United States	2:23:34	
9	Mizuki Matsuda	Japan	2:23:49	
10	Citlali Moscote	Mexico	2:26:33	
11	Zhang Deshun	China	2:28:11	
12	Jess Piasecki	Great Britain & N.I.	2:28:41	
13	Leslie Sexton	Canada	2:28:52	SB
14	Sarah Klein	Australia	2:30:10	PB
15	Militsa Mircheva	Bulgaria	2:30:20	
16	Alisa Vainio	Finland	2:30:29	
17	Tereza Hrochová	Czech Republic	2:30:39	SB
18	Risper Gesabwa	Mexico	2:30:47	SB
19	Mieke Gorissen	Belgium	2:31:06	SB
20	Beverly Ramos	Puerto Rico	2:31:10	NR
21	Zhanna Mamazhanova	Kazakhstan	2:31:15	
22	Li Zhixuan	China	2:31:20	SB
23	Maor Tiyouri	Israel	2:31:54	PB
24	Hanna Lindholm	Sweden	2:32:08	PB
25	Carolina Wikström	Sweden	2:32:24	
26	Kinsey Middleton	Canada	2:32:56	
27	Élissa Legault	Canada	2:37:35	
28	Adrijana Pop Arsova	North Macedonia	2:41:20	
29	Kit Ching Yiu	Hong Kong	2:43:13	SB
30	Munkhzaya Bayartsogt	Mongolia	2:46:09	
31	Tsao Chun-yu	Chinese Taipei	2:47:02	SB
32	Aydee Huaman	Peru	3:04:16	SB
	Ashete Bekere	Ethiopia	DNF	
	Andrea Bonilla	Ecuador	DNF	
	Rosa Chacha	Ecuador	DNF	
	Immaculate Chemutai	Uganda	DNF	
	Ruth Chepngetich	Kenya	DNF	
	Rose Harvey	Great Britain & N.I.	DNF	
	Charlotte Purdue	Great Britain & N.I.	DNF	
	Ababel Yeshaneh	Ethiopia	DNF	
	Hitomi Niiya	Japan	DNS	
