= Germany at the 2022 World Athletics Championships =

- Flag of Germany
- WA code: GER
- National federation: German Athletics Association
- Website: leichtathletik.de (in German)

in Eugene, United States 15–24 July 2022
- Competitors: 79 (39 men and 40 women)
- Medals Ranked 19th: Gold 1 Silver 0 Bronze 1 Total 2

World Athletics Championships appearances (overview)
- 1991; 1993; 1995; 1997; 1999; 2001; 2003; 2005; 2007; 2009; 2011; 2013; 2015; 2017; 2019; 2022; 2023; 2025

Germany competed at the 2022 World Athletics Championships in Eugene, United States, from 15 to 24 July 2022. The German Athletics Association nominated 79 athletes.

== Medalists ==
Medal	Athlete	Event	Date
Gold	Malaika Mihambo	Long jump	24 July
Bronze	Tatjana Pinto; Alexandra Burghardt; Gina Lückenkemper; Rebekka Haase	4 × 100 metres relay	23 July

== Entrants ==
- including alternates

=== Men ===
Track and road events

Athlete	Event	Heat		Semi-final		Final	
Athlete	Event	Result	Rank	Result	Rank	Result	Rank
Julian Wagner	100 metres	10.21	32	did not advance			
Owen Ansah	200 metres	20.52	24	did not advance			
Marc Reuther	800 metres	1:50.75	40	did not advance			
Christoph Kessler	1500 metres	3:37.57	19	did not advance			
Mohamed Mohumed	5000 metres	13:52.00	33	—		did not advance	
Sam Parsons	5000 metres	13:24.50	14 q	—		13:45.89	15
Maximilian Thorwirth	5000 metres	13:43.02	28	—		did not advance	
Tom Gröschel	Marathon	—				2:14:56 SB	43
Gregor Traber	110 metres hurdles	13.81	32	did not advance			
Karl Bebendorf	3000 metres steeplechase	8:25.73 SB	21	—		did not advance	
Frederik Ruppert	3000 metres steeplechase	8:45.55	38	—		did not advance	
Christopher Linke	20 kilometres walk	—				DNF	
Carl Dohmann	35 kilometres walk	—				2:45:44	40
Karl Junghannß	35 kilometres walk	—				2:38:50	34
Owen Ansah; Lucas Ansah-Peprah; Joshua Hartmann; Kevin Kranz; Milo Skupin-Alfa; Julian Wagner	4 × 100 metres relay	38.83	11	—		did not advance	
Marc Koch; Hendrik Krause; Maximilian Kremser; Manuel Sanders; Marvin Schlegel; Patrick Schneider	4 × 400 metres relay	3:04.21	11	—		did not advance	

Field events

Athlete	Event	Qualification		Final	
Athlete	Event	Distance	Position	Distance	Position
Tobias Potye	High jump	2.21	19	did not advance	
Mateusz Przybylko	High jump	2.25	12 q	2.24	12
Torben Blech	Pole vault	NM		did not advance	
Bo Kanda Lita Baehre	Pole vault	5.75	9 q	5.87	7
Oleg Zernikel	Pole vault	5.75	1 q	5.87 PB	5
Max Heß	Triple jump	16.64	13	did not advance	
Simon Bayer	Shot put	19.71	23	did not advance	
Torben Brandt	Discus throw	54.11	29	did not advance	
Henrik Janssen	Discus throw	61.85	19	did not advance	
Martin Wierig	Discus throw	62.28	17	did not advance	
Tristan Schwandke	Hammer throw	72.87	22	did not advance	
Andreas Hofmann	Javelin throw	NM		did not advance	
Julian Weber	Javelin throw	87.28	3 Q	86.86	4

Combined events – Decathlon

Athlete	Event	100 m	LJ	SP	HJ	400 m	110H	DT	PV	JT	1500 m	Final	Rank
Niklas Kaul	Result	11.22	7.09	14.52	2.05 SB	48.39 SB	14.27 PB	44.62	4.80	69.78 SB	4:13.81 PB	8434 SB	6
Niklas Kaul	Points	812	845	760	850	890	940	759	849	885	854	8434 SB	6
Kai Kazmirek	Result	11.19	7.49	14.29 SB	2.02	49.33	14.43	40.96	5.00 =SB	62.52	4:43.51	8113 SB	12
Kai Kazmirek	Points	819	932	746	822	846	920	684	910	776	658	8113 SB	12
Leo Neugebauer	Result	11.07	7.46	15.83	1.99	48.34	14.86	51.88	4.80	52.80	4:48.41	8182	10
Leo Neugebauer	Points	845	925	841	794	893	867	910	849	630	628	8182	10
Tim Nowak	Result	11.43	7.13	14.44	2.05	50.94	14.91	42.13	NM	56.52	4:26.87	7008	18
Tim Nowak	Points	767	845	755	850	772	860	708	0	686	765	7008	18

=== Women ===
Track and road events

Athlete	Event	Heat		Semi-final		Final	
Athlete	Event	Result	Rank	Result	Rank	Result	Rank
Alexandra Burghardt	100 metres	11.29 SB	30	did not advance			
Gina Lückenkemper	100 metres	11.09	14 Q	11.08	13	did not advance	
Sophia Junk	200 metres	23.27 SB	28	did not advance			
Jessica-Bianca Wessolly	200 metres	22.87	19 q	23.33	22	did not advance	
Christina Hering	800 metres	2:01.63	23 q	2:01.57	23	did not advance	
Majtie Kolberg	800 metres	2:01.21 SB	12 q	2:01.36	20	did not advance	
Hanna Klein	1500 metres	4:05.13	12 Q	4:04.62	11	did not advance	
Katharina Trost	1500 metres	4:03.53 PB	5 Q	4:05.85	17	did not advance	
Sara Benfarès	5000 metres	16:34.23	33	—		did not advance	
Konstanze Klosterhalfen	5000 metres	15:17.78	19	—		did not advance	
Alina Reh	5000 metres	15:13.92	17	—		did not advance	
Carolina Krafzik	400 metres hurdles	56.24	24	did not advance			
Gesa Felicitas Krause	3000 metres steeplechase	9:21.02 SB	15 q	—		9:52.66	15
Lea Meyer	3000 metres steeplechase	9:30.81	28	—		did not advance	
Saskia Feige	20 kilometres walk	—				1:32:12	15
Alexandra Burghardt; Rebekka Haase; Gina Lückenkemper; Tatjana Pinto	4 × 100 metres relay	42.44	4 Q	—		42.03 SB	3rd place, bronze medalist(s)
Judith Franzen; Elisa Lechleitner; Alica Schmidt; Corinna Schwab	4 × 400 metres relay	3:30.48	11	—		did not advance	

Field events

Athlete	Event	Qualification		Final	
Athlete	Event	Distance	Position	Distance	Position
Marie-Laurence Jungfleisch	High jump	1.86 SB	21	did not advance	
Jacqueline Otchere	Pole vault	4.50 SB	1 q	4.45	10
Merle Homeier	Long jump	6.09	23	did not advance	
Malaika Mihambo	Long jump	6.84	2 Q	7.12 SB	1st place, gold medalist(s)
Neele Eckhardt-Noack	Triple jump	13.93	20	did not advance	
Jessie Maduka	Triple jump	13.30	27	did not advance	
Katharina Maisch	Shot put	18.57	13	did not advance	
Julia Ritter	Shot put	18.22	15	did not advance	
Shanice Craft	Discus throw	64.55	5 Q	62.35	9
Kristin Pudenz	Discus throw	64.39	6 Q	59.97	11
Claudine Vita	Discus throw	64.98 SB	4 Q	64.24	5
Annika Marie Fuchs	Javelin throw	59.36	10 q	56.46	12
Samantha Borutta	Hammer throw	67.48	25	did not advance	

Combined events – Heptathlon

Athlete	Event	100H	HJ	SP	200 m	LJ	JT	800 m	Final	Rank
Sophie Weißenberg	Result	13.51 PB	1.74	13.57	24.06	NM	DNF			
Sophie Weißenberg	Points	1049	903	765	975	0	DNF			

=== Mixed ===
Track and road events

Athlete	Event	Heat		Semi-final		Final	
Athlete	Event	Result	Rank	Result	Rank	Result	Rank
Marvin Schlegel; Alica Schmidt; Patrick Schneider; Corinna Schwab	4 × 400 metres relay	3:16.80 SB	12	—		did not advance	
