= Uganda at the 2022 World Athletics Championships =

- Flag of Uganda
- WA code: UGA

in Eugene, United States 15 July 2022 – 24 July 2022
- Competitors: 17 (10 men and 7 women)
- Medals Ranked 16th: Gold 1 Silver 0 Bronze 2 Total 3

World Athletics Championships appearances
- 1983; 1987; 1991; 1993; 1995; 1997; 1999; 2001; 2003; 2005; 2007; 2009; 2011; 2013; 2015; 2017; 2019; 2022; 2023

Uganda is competing at the 2022 World Athletics Championships in Eugene, United States, being held from 15 to 24 July 2022.

== Medallists ==
Medal	Name	Event	Date
Gold	Joshua Cheptegei	Men's 10,000 metres	17 July
Bronze	Jacob Kiplimo	Men's 10,000 metres	17 July
Bronze	Oscar Chelimo	Men's 5000 metres	24 July

== Results ==
Uganda has entered 17 athletes.

Key

- Q = Qualified for the next round
- q = Qualified for the next round as a fastest loser or, in field events, by position without achieving the qualifying target
- NR = National record
- PB = Personal best
- SB = Season best
- N/A = Round not applicable for the event

=== Men ===
Track and road events

Athlete	Event	Heat		Semi-final		Final	
Athlete	Event	Result	Rank	Result	Rank	Result	Rank
Tarsis Orogot	200 m	20.44	22 Q	20.35	13	did not advance	
Ronald Musagala	1500 m	3:40.87	37	did not advance			
Oscar Chelimo	5000 m	13:24.24	9 Q	—		13:10.20 SB	3rd place, bronze medalist(s)
Joshua Cheptegei	5000 m	13:24.47	12 Q	—		13:13.12	9
Joshua Cheptegei	10000 m	—				27:27.43 SB	1st place, gold medalist(s)
Peter Maru	5000 m	13:47.65	32	—		did not advance	
Jacob Kiplimo	10000 m	—				27:27.97 SB	3rd place, bronze medalist(s)
Stephen Kissa	10000 m	—				29:21.10 SB	24
Felix Chemonges	Marathon	—				2:12:16	34
Jackson Kiprop	Marathon	—				2:12:14	33
Fred Musobo	Marathon	—				2:13:58 SB	40

=== Women ===
Track and road events

Athlete	Event	Heat		Semi-final		Final	
Athlete	Event	Result	Rank	Result	Rank	Result	Rank
Halimah Nakaayi	800 m	2:01.41	17 Q	2:01.05	19	did not advance	
Winnie Nanyondo	1500 m	4:03.81	7 q	DNF	23 qR	4:01.98	8
Esther Chebet	5000 m	15:26.40	23	—		did not advance	
Mercyline Chelangat	10000 m	—				31:28.26 SB	16
Stella Chesang	10000 m	—				31:01.04 NR	14
Peruth Chemutai	3000 m steeplechase	9:16.66	9 q	—		9:21.93	11
Immaculate Chemutai	Marathon	—				DNF	
