= Albania at the World Athletics Championships =

- WA code: ALB
- National federation: Albanian Athletics Federation
- Website: aaf.al
- Medals: Gold 0 Silver 0 Bronze 0 Total 0

World Athletics Championships appearances (overview)
- 1983; 1987; 1991; 1993; 1995; 1997; 1999; 2001; 2003; 2005; 2007; 2009; 2011; 2013; 2015; 2017; 2019; 2022; 2023; 2025

Albania has competed at the World Athletics Championships on fifteen occasions, and did not send a delegation for the 1987 edition. Its competing country code is ALB. The country has not won any medals at the competition and as of 2017 no Albanian athlete has reached the top eight of an event. Its best performance is by Mirela Manjani, who placed twelfth in the 1995 women's javelin throw final. Manjani later won two gold medals competing for Greece.

== Results ==
Key

- Q = Qualified for the next round
- q = Qualified for the next round as a fastest loser or, in field events, by position without achieving the qualifying target
- NR = National record
- PB = Personal best
- SB = Season best
- N/A = Round not applicable for the event

=== 2007 ===
Albania entered 1 athlete at the 2007 World Championships in Athletics in Osaka, Japan, from 25 August to 2 September 2007.

==== Men ====
Field events

Athlete	Event	Qualification		Final		Final Rank
Athlete	Event	Result	Rank	Result	Rank	Final Rank
Dorian Collaku	Hammer throw	68.30 SB	13	Did not advance		27

=== 2009 ===
One athlete from Albania competed at the 2009 World Championships in Athletics in Berlin.

==== Men ====
Event	Athletes	Qualification		Final	
Event	Athletes	Result	Rank	Result	Rank
Shot put	Adriatik Hoxha	15.89	34	did not advance	

=== 2011 ===
Albania competed at the 2011 World Championships in Athletics from August 27 to September 4 in Daegu, South Korea. Only one athlete, middle-distance runner Luiza Gega, was announced to represent the country at the tournament.

==== Women ====
Athlete	Event	Preliminaries		Heats		Semifinals		Final	
Athlete	Event	Time Width Height	Rank	Time Width Height	Rank	Time Width Height	Rank	Time Width Height	Rank
Luiza Gega	800 metres			2:03.21	28	Did not advance			

=== 2013 ===
Albania competed at the 2013 World Championships in Athletics from August 10 to August 18 in Moscow, Russia. A team of 2 athletes was announced to represent the country in the event.

==== Men ====
Athlete	Event	Preliminaries		Final	
Athlete	Event	Mark	Rank	Mark	Rank
Izmir Smajlaj	Long jump	7.55	24	did not advance	

==== Women ====
Athlete	Event	Heats		Semifinals		Final	
Athlete	Event	Time	Rank	Time	Rank	Time	Rank
Luiza Gega	1500 metres	4:08.76	20 q	4:08.79	19	did not advance	

=== 2015 ===
Albania competed at the 2015 World Championships in Athletics in Beijing, China, from 22–30 August 2015, with one athlete from the country in attendance.

==== Women ====
Track and road events

Athlete	Event	Heat		Semifinal		Final	
Athlete	Event	Result	Rank	Result	Rank	Result	Rank
Luiza Gega	1500 metres	4:09.36	10	Did not advance			

=== 2017 ===
Albania fielded one athlete at the 2017 World Championships in Athletics in London, United Kingdom, 4–13 August 2017.

==== Women ====
Track and road events

Athlete	Event	Heat		Semifinal		Final	
Athlete	Event	Result	Rank	Result	Rank	Result	Rank
Luiza Gega	3000 metres steeplechase	DNS	–	—N/a		Did not advance	

=== 2019 ===
Albania competed at the 2019 World Championships in Athletics in Doha, Qatar, from 27 September to 6 October 2019. The country was represented by one athlete, Luiza Gega, who achieved a national record in the 3000 metres steeplechase.

==== Women ====
Athlete	Event	Heat		Final	
Athlete	Event	Result	Rank	Result	Rank
Luiza Gega	3000 m steeplechase	9:28.32	10	9:19.93 NR	9

=== 2022 ===
Albania fielded one athlete at the 2022 World Athletics Championships in Eugene, United States, from 15 to 24 July 2022. Middle-distance runner Luiza Gega returned to set a national record in the women's 3000 metre steeplechase, placing 5th in the tournament finals.

==== Women ====
Track and road events

Athlete	Event	Heat		Final	
Athlete	Event	Result	Rank	Result	Rank
Luiza Gega	Women's 3000 metres steeplechase	9:14.91	3 Q	9:10.04 NR	5

=== 2023 ===
Albania entered 2 athletes, 1 man and 1 woman, at the 2023 World Athletics Championships in Budapest, Hungary, from 19 to 27 August 2023.

==== Men ====
Track and road events

Athlete	Event	Heat		Semifinal		Final	
Athlete	Event	Result	Rank	Result	Rank	Result	Rank
Franko Burraj	200 metres	21.52	8	Did not advance			

==== Women ====
Track and road events

Athlete	Event	Heat		Final	
Athlete	Event	Result	Rank	Result	Rank
Luiza Gega	3000 metres steeplechase	9:17.71	3 Q	9:10.27 SB	8

=== 2025 ===
Albania entered 1 female athlete at the 2025 World Athletics Championships in Tokyo, Japan, from 13 to 21 September 2025.

==== Women ====
Field events

Athlete	Event	Qualification		Final	
Athlete	Event	Distance	Position	Distance	Position
Yipsi Moreno	Hammer throw	65.38	34	Did not advance	
