= Kenya at the 2022 World Athletics Championships =

Kenya at the 2022 World Championships in Athletics
- WA code: KEN
- Website: www.athleticskenya.or.ke

in Eugene
- Competitors: 43 (24 men and 19 women) in 17 events
- Medals Ranked 4th: Gold 2 Silver 5 Bronze 3 Total 10

World Championships in Athletics appearances (overview)
- 1983; 1987; 1991; 1993; 1995; 1997; 1999; 2001; 2003; 2005; 2007; 2009; 2011; 2013; 2015; 2017; 2019; 2022; 2023; 2025

Kenya competed at the 2022 World Athletics Championships in Eugene, United States, from 15 to 24 July 2022. The country finished in 4th place in the medal table.

== Medalists ==
Medal	Athlete	Event	Date
Gold	Emmanuel Korir	Men's 800 metres	23 July
Gold	Faith Kipyegon	Women's 1500 metres	18 July
Silver	Jacob Krop	Men's 5000 metres	24 July
Silver	Stanley Mburu	Men's 10,000 metres	17 July
Silver	Beatrice Chebet	Women's 5,000 metres	23 July
Silver	Hellen Obiri	Women's 10,000 metres	16 July
Silver	Judith Korir	Women's marathon	18 July
Bronze	Conseslus Kipruto	Men's 3000 metres steeplechase	18 July
Bronze	Mary Moraa	Women's 800 metres	24 July
Bronze	Margaret Kipkemboi	Women's 10,000 metres	16 July

== Results ==
Kenya entered 45 athletes.

Key

- Q = Qualified for the next round
- q = Qualified for the next round as a fastest loser or, in field events, by position without achieving the qualifying target
- NR = National record
- PB = Personal best
- SB = Season best
- N/A = Round not applicable for the event

=== Men ===
Track and road events

Athlete	Event	Heat		Semi-final		Final	
Athlete	Event	Result	Rank	Result	Rank	Result	Rank
Ferdinand Omanyala	100 m	10.10	17 Q	10.14	13	Did not advance	
Wyclife Kinyamal	800 m	1:45.08	6 Q	1:45.49	6 Q	1:47.07	8
Noah Kibet	800 m	1:45.41	8 q	1:47.15	22	Did not advance	
Emmanuel Wanyonyi	800 m	1:46.45	21 Q	1:45.42	4 q	1:44.54	4
Emmanuel Korir	800 m	1:49.05	35 Q	1:45.38 SB	3 Q	1:43.71 SB	1st place, gold medalist(s)
Timothy Cheruiyot	1500 m	3:36.41	12 Q	3:37.04	12 Q	3:30.69	6
Kumari Taki	1500 m	3:36.47	13 q	3:50.15	24	Did not advance	
Charles Simotwo	1500 m	3:37.66	20	Did not advance			
Abel Kipsang	1500 m	3:39.21	26 Q	3:33.68	1 Q	3:31.21	7
Jacob Krop	5000 m	13:13.30	1 Q	—N/a		13:09.98	2nd place, silver medalist(s)
Daniel Ebenyo	5000 m	13:15.17	6 q	—N/a		13:16.64	10
Nicholas Kimeli	5000 m	13:24.56	15 q	—N/a		13:11.97	7
Stanley Mburu	10,000 m	—N/a				27:27.90 SB	2nd place, silver medalist(s)
Daniel Mateiko	10,000 m	—N/a				27:33.57 SB	8
Rodgers Kwemoi	10,000 m	—N/a				27:52.26	15
Geoffrey Kamworor	Marathon	—N/a				2:07:14 SB	5
Barnabas Kiptum	Marathon	—N/a				2:08:59	15
Leonard Bett	3000 m steeplechase	8:16.94	2 Q	—N/a		8:36.74	15
Abraham Kibiwot	3000 m steeplechase	8:17.04	3 Q	—N/a		8:28.95	5
Conseslus Kipruto	3000 m steeplechase	8:20.12	11 Q	—N/a		8:27.92	3rd place, bronze medalist(s)
Benjamin Kigen	3000 m steeplechase	8:22.52	19	—N/a		Did not advance	
Moitalel Naadokila	400 m hurdles	50.19	26 Q	49.34	12	Did not advance	
Samuel Gathimba	20 km walk	—N/a				1:19:25 SB	4

Field events

Athlete	Event	Qualification		Final	
Athlete	Event	Distance	Position	Distance	Position
Julius Yego	Javelin throw	79.60	14	Did not advance	

=== Women ===
Track and road events

Athlete	Event	Heat		Semi-final		Final	
Athlete	Event	Result	Rank	Result	Rank	Result	Rank
Mary Moraa	800 m	2:00.42	5 Q	1:59.65	7 Q	1:56.71 PB	3rd place, bronze medalist(s)
Jarinter Mawia Mwasya	800 m	2:02.35	30	Did not advance			
Naomi Korir	800 m	2:01.61	21 q	2:03.08	25	Did not advance	
Winny Chebet	1500 m	4:03.12 SB	2 Q	4:03.08 SB	6 q	4:15.13	13
Faith Kipyegon	1500 m	4:04.53	8 Q	4:03.98	7 Q	3:52.96	1st place, gold medalist(s)
Edinah Jebitok	1500 m	4:07.12	20	Did not advance			
Judy Kiyeng	1500 m	4:09.30	33	Did not advance			
Beatrice Chebet	5000 m	14:53.34 SB	8 Q	—N/a		14:46.75 SB	2nd place, silver medalist(s)
Margaret Kipkemboi	5000 m	14:53.45 SB	9 Q	—N/a		14:47.71 SB	4
Gloria Kite	5000 m	14:53.62 SB	10 q	—N/a		15:01.22	10
Hellen Obiri	10,000 m	—N/a				30:10.02 PB	2nd place, silver medalist(s)
Margaret Kipkemboi	10,000 m	—N/a				30:10.07 PB	3rd place, bronze medalist(s)
Sheila Chepkirui	10,000 m	—N/a				Did not start	
Judith Korir	Marathon	—N/a				2:18:20 PB	2nd place, silver medalist(s)
Angela Tanui	Marathon	—N/a				2:22:15	6
Ruth Chepngetich	Marathon	—N/a				Did not finish	
Celliphine Chespol	3000 m steeplechase	9:16.78	10 Q	—N/a		9:27.34	13
Purity Kirui	3000 m steeplechase	9:26.88 SB	24	—N/a		Did not advance	
Jackline Chepkoech	3000 m steeplechase	9:27.50	25	—N/a		Did not advance	
Emily Wamusyi Ngii	20 km walk	—N/a				1:37:43	30
