= Beynon Sports Surfaces =

- Industry: Sports Surfacing
- Founder: John Beynon
- Headquarters: Hunt Valley, Maryland, United States
- Area served: Worldwide
- Products: All-weather running tracks, gymnasium surfaces and Field Houses
- Website: www.beynonsports.com

Beynon Sports Surfaces is a manufacturer and installer of synthetic all-weather running tracks. They are part of Tarkett Sports and are based in Hunt Valley, Maryland. Beynon Sports Surfaces manufactures three types of outdoor synthetic athletic tracks; spray coat, sandwich (multi layer) and full pour polyurethane. They also offer surfaces for fieldhouses (indoor track) and gymnasiums.

== History ==
In 2001, after three decades with Martin Surfacing, John T. Beynon founded Beynon Sports Surfaces. In the spring of 2008, Beynon Sports Surfaces joined the Tarkett Sports family, which included FieldTurf.

In 2009 Atlas Track and Tennis was purchased by Tarkett Sports and merged with Beynon. In 2012 the merge was completed with both companies now going by the name Beynon Sports.

== Track and Field ==
Beynon Sports Surfaces has installed many track and field venues in North America and across the world. One such installation is Hayward Field at the University of Oregon, site of the U.S. Olympic trials.

== International Association of Athletics Federations (IAAF) ==
Beynon Sports Surfaces offers many different surfaces for various levels of competition. The BSS 100, 200, 300 embedded, 300 encapsulated, 1000ML 1000, 2000 and 3000 are all IAAF certified.

Beynon Sports has installed 2 of the 4 IAAF Class 1 Facility certified surfaces in North America and has 8 IAAF certified surfaces on the market.

== Fieldhouses ==
Beynon also has various surfaces that can be used for indoor needs.
