= Werkuha Getachew =

Ethiopian athlete (born 1995)

Personal information
- Nationality: Ethiopian
- Born: 7 December 1995 (age 30)

Sport
- Country: Ethiopia
- Sport: Athletics
- Events: 3000 m steeplechase, Middle-distance running
Medal record
Women's athletics
Representing Ethiopia
World Championships
Silver medal – second place	2022 Eugene	3000 m st.
Diamond League
First place	2022	3000 m st.
African Championships
Gold medal – first place	2022 Saint Pierre	3000 m st.

Werkwuha Getachew (born 7 December 1995) is an Ethiopian athlete who specialises in the 3000 metres steeplechase. She won the silver medal in the event at the 2022 World Championships and a gold at the 2022 African Championships.

== Biography ==
From Gelemso in Hararghe in the eastern part of Ethiopia, in June 2021 at the Fanny Blankers-Koen Stadium in Hengelo at the Ethiopian Olympic trial event, Getachew ran in the women's 800 metres, lowering her personal best to 2:00.20 to set an early world lead of 1:56.67 and set a new national record. She became the first woman in the world to break 1:57 in 2021 and secured her spot at the delayed 2020 Tokyo Olympics. Despite being named in official documentation and travelling to Tokyo, Getachew was pulled out the day of the women's 800m heats and did not participate.

In December 2021, Getachew ran her first steeplechase race. The following July, she won the silver medal in the 3000 metres steeplechase at the 2022 World Championships in Eugene, Oregon, running an Ethiopian record time of 8:54.61. She also won the gold medal at the 2022 African Championships in Mauritius. In September 2022, she won her specialist event in Zurich to became the 2022 Diamond League champion.

In January 2026, she won the Toa Baja Marathon in Puerto Rico in a women's record time for the course of 2:36:09. Also in Puerto Rico, she won the San Blas Half Marathon on 1 March 2026. In 2025, she won the women's division of the Virginia 10 Miler with a time of 54:53, then won again in 2026 with a time of 55:08.

== Achievements ==
=== International competitions ===
Representing Ethiopia
Year	Competition	Venue	Position	Event	Time
2022	African Championships	Port Louis, Mauritius	1st	3000 m st.	9:36.81
2022	World Championships	Eugene, OR, United States	2nd	3000 m st.	8:54.61 NR

=== Personal bests ===
- 800 metres – 1:56.67 (Hengelo 2021) NR
- 1500 metres – 4:10.0h (Addis Ababa 2021)
  - 3000 metres indoor – 8:37.98 (Karlsruhe 2023)
- 3000 metres steeplechase – 8:54.61 (Eugene, OR 2022) NR

=== Circuit wins and titles, National titles ===
- Diamond League champion 3000 m steeplechase: 2022
  - 2022 (3000 m st.): Monaco Herculis, Zürich Weltklasse
- Ethiopian Athletics Championships
  - 800 metres: 2021
  - 3000 metres steeplechase: 2022
