= Yuno Yamanaka =

Japanese middle-distance runner

Yamanaka Yuno
Personal information
- Nationality: Japanese
- Born: 25 December 2000 (age 25) Sakai, Japan

Sport
- Sport: Athletics
- Event: 3000 metres steeplechase

Yuno Yamanaka (Japanese: 山中 柚乃; born 25 December 2000) is a Japanese middle-distance runner. She qualified to represent Japan at the 2020 Summer Olympics in Tokyo 2021, competing in women's 3000 metres steeplechase.

== Personal life ==
Yamanaka was born in Sakai on 25 December 2000. In addition to being an athlete, she also works as a bank employee.
