= Ran Urabe =

Japanese middle-distance runner

Personal information
- Born: 16 June 1995 (age 31) Tokyo, Japan

Sport
- Country: Japan
- Sport: Athletics
- Event: 1500 metres

Ran Urabe (卜部蘭, born 16 June 1995) is a Japanese athlete. She competed in the women's 1500 metres event at the 2020 Summer Olympics.
