= Reimi Yoshimura =

Japanese long-distance runner

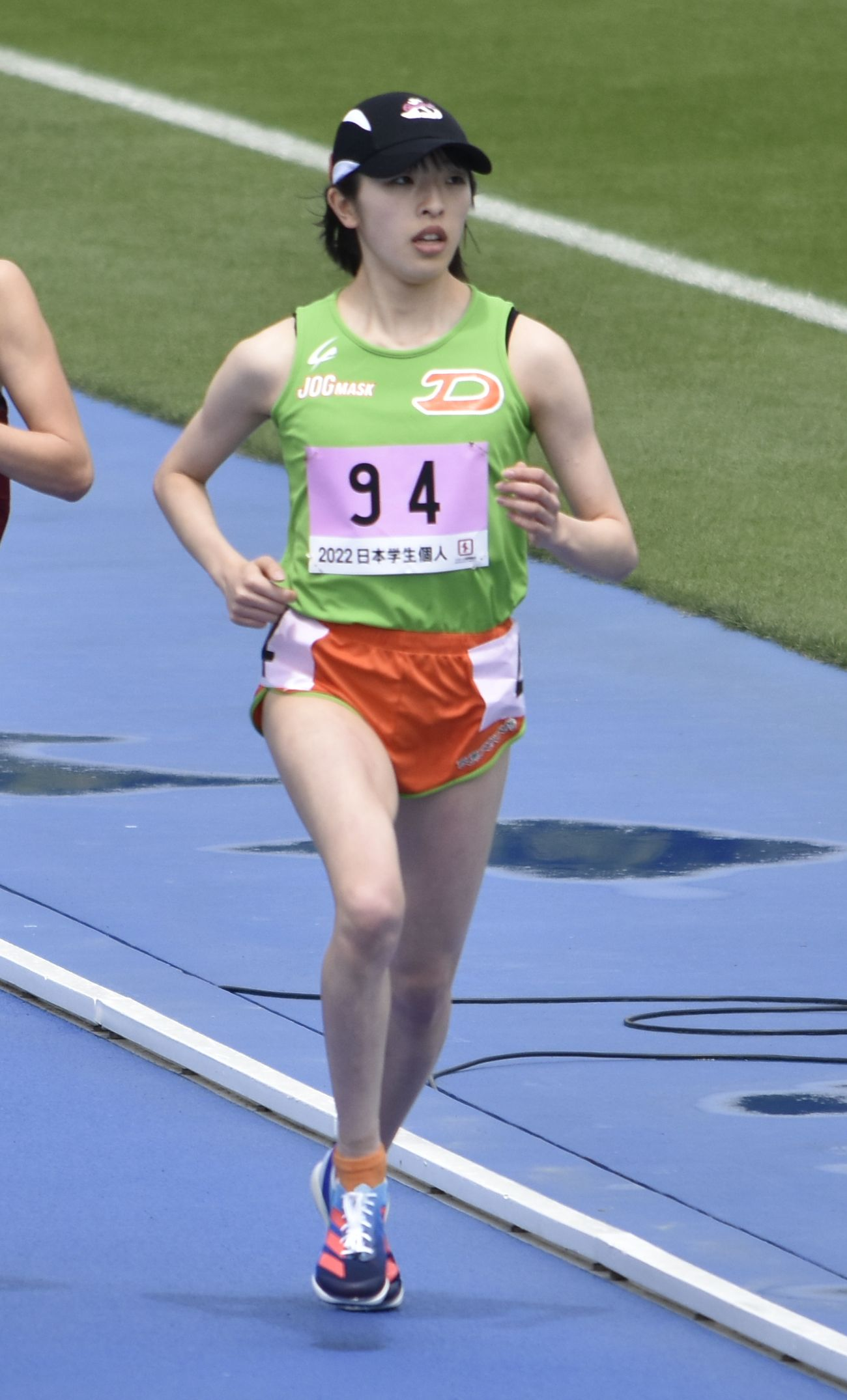
- Reimi Yoshimura, April 17, 2022

Personal information
- Nationality: Japanese
- Born: 22 April 2000 (age 25)

Sport
- Sport: Athletics
- Event: Steeplechase

Reimi Yoshimura (吉村 玲美, Yoshimura Reimi; born 22 April 2000) is a Japanese athlete. She competed in the women's 3000 metres steeplechase event at the 2019 World Athletics Championships.
