= Kaede Hagitani =

Japanese long-distance runner

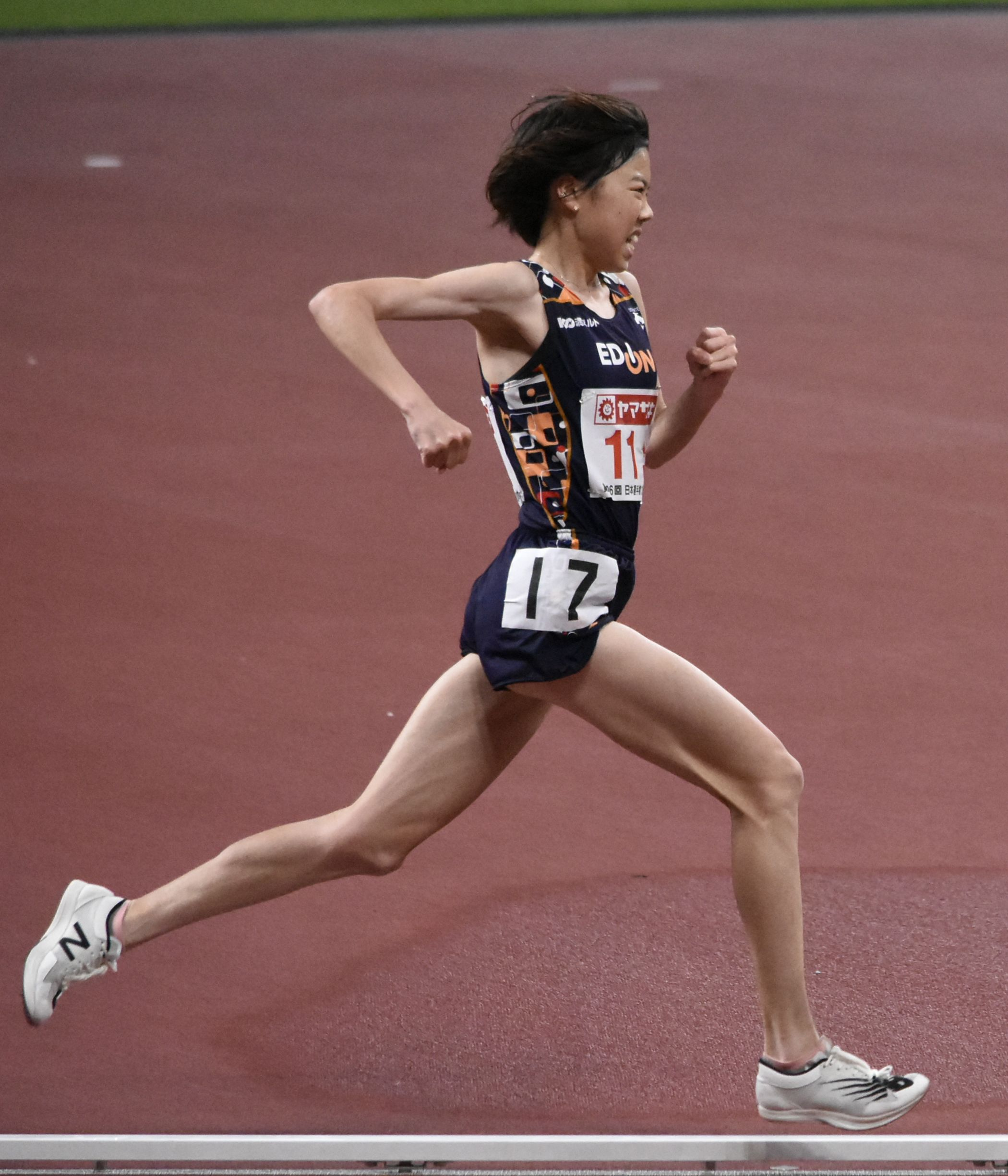
- Hagitani at the 2022 Japan Championships

Personal information
- Nationality: Japanese
- Born: 10 October 2000 (age 25)

Sport
- Country: Japan
- Sport: Athletics
- Event: 5000 metres

Kaede Hagitani (萩谷楓, born 10 October 2000) is a Japanese athlete. She competed in the women's 5000 metres event at the 2020 Summer Olympics.
