= 2022 World Athletics Championships =

Athletics competition in Oregon, United States

World Athletics Championships Oregon 2022
- Host city: Eugene, Oregon
- Country: United States
- Motto: Feel the Glory
- Organizers: World Athletics, USATF
- Edition: 18th
- Nations: 179+1
- Athletes: 1,705
- Sport: Athletics
- Events: 49 + 1 team
- Dates: 15–24 July 2022
- Opened by: Second Gentleman Doug Emhoff
- Closed by: World Athletics President Sebastian Coe
- Main venue: Hayward Field
- Individual prize money (US$): 70,000
- Team prize money (US$): 80,000
- Website: Oregon22

The 2022 World Athletics Championships was the eighteenth edition of the World Athletics Championships. It was held at Hayward Field in Eugene, Oregon, United States, from July 15–24, 2022, with the country hosting that competition for the first time. The competition was originally scheduled to take place in 2021, but it was pushed back by one year due to the postponement of the 2020 Summer Olympics to 2021 and due to the COVID-19 pandemic.

After the 2022 Russian invasion of Ukraine, World Athletics banned all Russian and Belarusian athletes and officials from participating at the championships. In addition, the stringent vaccination requirements for people entering the United States caused visa delays for participants and officials, with some ultimately being unable to enter the country. These issues caused the final total to stand at 179 nations (180 including the Athlete Refugee Team), the lowest number since Tokyo 1991.

A record 29 countries won at least one gold medal during the championships. Peru, Kazakhstan, and Nigeria won their first-ever gold medals. India and Burkina Faso had their best medal performances, winning a silver, and the Philippines won a bronze. A new award was the team event trophy, which was won by the United States, which also won the most gold medals, with 13, and the most medals overall, with 33 (a record for a single edition). The event was the most-watched edition ever in US television history. More than 146,000 tickets were sold, with several evening sessions sold out.

There were four athletes who won two gold medals: Kimberly García in the Women's 20 km Race Walk and the Women's 35km Race Walk; Michael Norman in the Men's 400 m and the Men's 4 × 400 m Relay; Sydney McLaughlin in the Women's 400 m Hurdles and the Women's 4 × 400 m Relay; and Abby Steiner in the Women's 4 × 100 m Relay and Women's 4 × 400 m Relay. In addition to the athletes who won two gold medals, Shelly-Ann Fraser-Pryce and Shericka Jackson both of Jamaica, earned 3 medals, 1 gold and 2 silvers in the Women's 100 m (Fraser-Pryce gold; Jackson silver), the Women's 200 metres (Jackson gold; Fraser-Pryce silver) and the Women's 4 × 100 m Relay (silver for both).

Three world records and 13 championship records were broken. The world records were set by Sydney McLaughlin, who ran 50.68 seconds in the Women's 400 m Hurdles final; Tobi Amusan, who won the Women's 100 m Hurdles semi-final in 12.12 seconds; and Armand Duplantis, who reached 6.21 meters in the Men's Pole Vault final.

== Host selection and venue ==
The selection of the host city was announced on April 16, 2015, in Beijing, China. Eugene was selected without a traditional bidding process, though Eugene did put in a bid for the 2019 World Championships, losing out to Doha.

Runner's World magazine reported that Eugene's selection by World Athletics, then known as the International Association of Athletics Federations, was an "unusual move". They report the Association "bypassed the usual bidding process," and that the choice of Eugene would make the 2022 event "the first held in the United States." The event was the second held in North America, after Edmonton in 2001.

The Guardian reported that the lack of bidding triggered concern in European cities that had bid to host the event. They quoted Lamine Diack, IAAF president, who justified the lack of bidding with the claim the selection of Eugene to host the event, "enables us to take advantage of a unique opportunity to host a financially successful tournament that may never arise again."

Despite this, the 2022 event was not the first to lack the usual bidding process: as the 2007 World Championships were awarded to Osaka without bidding after the withdrawal of the two other candidate cities.

=== Venue ===
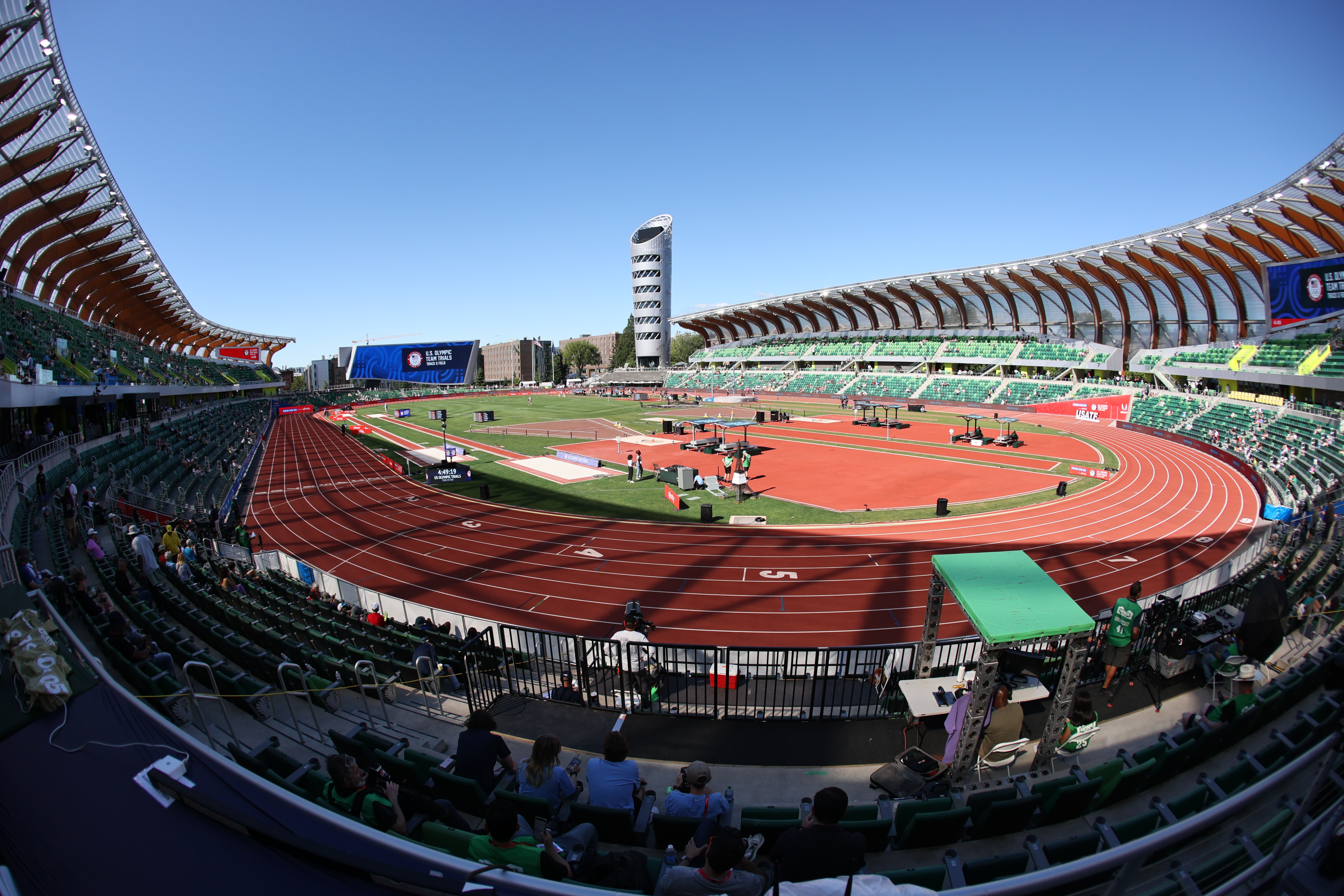
Panoramic view of the Hayward Field, pictured in June 2024.

The championships were held at the University of Oregon Hayward Field in Eugene, Oregon, which has 12,650 permanent seats and a temporary capacity of 25,000. The venue had previously hosted the 2020 USA Olympic Track and Field Trials, the 2021 and 2022 NCAA Division I Outdoor Track Field Championships and the 2022 USA Outdoor Track and Field Championships. The track, installed in 2021, was manufactured by Beynon Sports.

The race walking was held on a 1-km loop on Martin Luther King Jr. Boulevard, near Autzen Stadium, and the marathon race started from the same stadium, towards Pre's Trail and going to Springfield, Oregon and back.

== Medal table ==
* Host nation (United States)

Rank	Nation	Gold	Silver	Bronze	Total
1	United States*	13	9	11	33
2	Ethiopia	4	4	2	10
3	Jamaica	2	7	1	10
4	Kenya	2	5	3	10
5	China	2	1	3	6
6	Australia	2	0	1	3
7	Peru	2	0	0	2
8	Poland	1	3	0	4
9	Canada	1	2	1	4
9	Japan	1	2	1	4
11	Great Britain and Northern Ireland	1	1	5	7
12	Norway	1	1	1	3
13	Dominican Republic	1	1	0	2
13	Grenada	1	1	0	2
13	Nigeria	1	1	0	2
16	Belgium	1	0	2	3
16	Sweden	1	0	2	3
16	Uganda	1	0	2	3
19	Brazil	1	0	1	2
19	Germany	1	0	1	2
19	Italy	1	0	1	2
22	Bahamas	1	0	0	1
22	France	1	0	0	1
22	Kazakhstan	1	0	0	1
22	Morocco	1	0	0	1
22	Portugal	1	0	0	1
22	Qatar	1	0	0	1
22	Slovenia	1	0	0	1
22	Venezuela	1	0	0	1
30	Netherlands	0	3	1	4
31	Lithuania	0	1	1	2
31	Ukraine	0	1	1	2
33	Algeria	0	1	0	1
33	Burkina Faso	0	1	0	1
33	Croatia	0	1	0	1
33	Greece	0	1	0	1
33	India	0	1	0	1
33	South Korea	0	1	0	1
39	Spain	0	0	2	2
40	Barbados	0	0	1	1
40	Czech Republic	0	0	1	1
40	Israel	0	0	1	1
40	Philippines	0	0	1	1
40	Puerto Rico	0	0	1	1
40	Switzerland	0	0	1	1
Totals (45 entries)		49	49	49	147

Source: 2022 World Athletics Championships Medal Table

== Medal summary ==
=== Men ===
Event	Gold		Silver		Bronze	
100 metres	Fred Kerley; United States	9.86	Marvin Bracy; United States	9.88	Trayvon Bromell; United States	9.88
200 metres	Noah Lyles; United States	19.31 NR, WL	Kenny Bednarek; United States	19.77 SB	Erriyon Knighton; United States	19.80
400 metres	Michael Norman; United States	44.29	Kirani James; Grenada	44.48	Matthew Hudson-Smith; Great Britain and Northern Ireland	44.66
800 metres	Emmanuel Korir; Kenya	1:43.71 SB	Djamel Sedjati; Algeria	1:44.14	Marco Arop; Canada	1:44.28
1500 metres	Jake Wightman; Great Britain and Northern Ireland	3:29.23 WL, PB	Jakob Ingebrigtsen; Norway	3:29.47 SB	Mohamed Katir; Spain	3:29.90 SB
5000 metres	Jakob Ingebrigtsen; Norway	13:09.24	Jacob Krop; Kenya	13:09.98	Oscar Chelimo; Uganda	13:10.20 SB
10,000 metres	Joshua Cheptegei; Uganda	27:27.43 SB	Stanley Mburu; Kenya	27:27.90 SB	Jacob Kiplimo; Uganda	27:27.97 SB
4 × 100 metres relay	Canada; Aaron Brown; Jerome Blake; Brendon Rodney; Andre De Grasse	37.48 NR, WL	United States; Christian Coleman; Noah Lyles; Elijah Hall; Marvin Bracy	37.55 SB	Great Britain and Northern Ireland; Jona Efoloko; Zharnel Hughes; Nethaneel Mitchell-Blake; Reece Prescod; Adam Gemili*	37.83 SB
4 × 400 metres relay	United States; Elija Godwin; Michael Norman; Bryce Deadmon; Champion Allison; Vernon Norwood*; Trevor Bassitt*	2:56.17 WL	Jamaica; Akeem Bloomfield; Nathon Allen; Jevaughn Powell; Christopher Taylor; Karayme Bartley*; Anthony Cox*	2:58.58	Belgium; Dylan Borlée; Julien Watrin; Alexander Doom; Kevin Borlée; Jonathan Sacoor*	2:58.72
110 metres hurdles	Grant Holloway; United States	13.03	Trey Cunningham; United States	13.08	Asier Martínez; Spain	13.17 PB
400 metres hurdles	Alison dos Santos; Brazil	46.29 CR, AR, WL	Rai Benjamin; United States	46.89 SB	Trevor Bassitt; United States	47.39 PB
3000 metres steeplechase	Soufiane El Bakkali; Morocco	8:25.13	Lamecha Girma; Ethiopia	8:26.01	Conseslus Kipruto; Kenya	8:27.92
Marathon	Tamirat Tola; Ethiopia	2:05:36 CR	Mosinet Geremew; Ethiopia	2:06:44	Bashir Abdi; Belgium	2:06:48
20 kilometres walk	Toshikazu Yamanishi; Japan	1:19:07	Koki Ikeda; Japan	1:19:14	Perseus Karlström; Sweden	1:19:18
35 kilometres walk	Massimo Stano; Italy	2:23:14 CR, AR	Masatora Kawano; Japan	2:23:15 AR	Perseus Karlström; Sweden	2:23:44 PB
High jump	Mutaz Essa Barshim; Qatar	2.37 m WL	Woo Sang-hyeok; South Korea	2.35 m NR	Andriy Protsenko; Ukraine	2.33 m SB
Pole vault	Armand Duplantis; Sweden	6.21 m WR	Chris Nilsen; United States	5.94 m	Ernest John Obiena; Philippines	5.94 m AR
Long jump	Wang Jianan; China	8.36 m SB	Miltiadis Tentoglou; Greece	8.32 m	Simon Ehammer; Switzerland	8.16 m
Triple jump	Pedro Pichardo; Portugal	17.95 m WL	Hugues Fabrice Zango; Burkina Faso	17.55 m SB	Zhu Yaming; China	17.31 m SB
Shot put	Ryan Crouser; United States	22.94 m CR	Joe Kovacs; United States	22.89 m SB	Josh Awotunde; United States	22.29 m PB
Discus throw	Kristjan Čeh; Slovenia	71.13 m CR	Mykolas Alekna; Lithuania	69.27 m	Andrius Gudžius; Lithuania	67.55 m
Javelin throw	Anderson Peters; Grenada	90.54 m	Neeraj Chopra; India	88.13 m	Jakub Vadlejch; Czech Republic	88.09 m
Hammer throw	Paweł Fajdek; Poland	81.98 m WL	Wojciech Nowicki; Poland	81.03 m	Eivind Henriksen; Norway	80.87 m SB
Decathlon	Kevin Mayer; France	8816 SB	Pierce LePage; Canada	8701 PB	Zach Ziemek; United States	8676 PB
WR world record | AR area record | CR championship record | GR games record | NR national record | OR Olympic record | PB personal best | SB season best | WL world leading (in a given season)

* Indicates the athletes only competed in the preliminary heats and received medals

=== Women ===
Event	Gold		Silver		Bronze	
100 metres	Shelly-Ann Fraser-Pryce; Jamaica	10.67 CR, WL	Shericka Jackson; Jamaica	10.73 PB	Elaine Thompson-Herah; Jamaica	10.81
200 metres	Shericka Jackson; Jamaica	21.45 CR, NR, WL	Shelly-Ann Fraser-Pryce; Jamaica	21.81 SB	Dina Asher-Smith; Great Britain and Northern Ireland	22.02
400 metres	Shaunae Miller-Uibo; Bahamas	49.11 WL	Marileidy Paulino; Dominican Republic	49.60	Sada Williams; Barbados	49.75 NR
800 metres	Athing Mu; United States	1:56.30 WL	Keely Hodgkinson; Great Britain and Northern Ireland	1:56.38 SB	Mary Moraa; Kenya	1:56.71 PB
1500 metres	Faith Kipyegon; Kenya	3:52.96	Gudaf Tsegay; Ethiopia	3:54.52	Laura Muir; Great Britain and Northern Ireland	3:55.28 SB
5000 metres	Gudaf Tsegay; Ethiopia	14:46.29	Beatrice Chebet; Kenya	14:46.75 SB	Dawit Seyaum; Ethiopia	14:47.36
10,000 metres	Letesenbet Gidey; Ethiopia	30:09.94 WL	Hellen Obiri; Kenya	30:10.02 PB	Margaret Kipkemboi; Kenya	30:10.07 PB
4 × 100 metres relay	United States; Melissa Jefferson; Abby Steiner; Jenna Prandini; Twanisha Terry; Aleia Hobbs*	41.14 WL	Jamaica; Kemba Nelson; Elaine Thompson-Herah; Shelly-Ann Fraser-Pryce; Shericka Jackson; Briana Williams*; Natalliah Whyte*; Remona Burchell*	41.18 SB	Germany; Tatjana Pinto; Alexandra Burghardt; Gina Lückenkemper; Rebekka Haase	42.03 SB
4 × 400 metres relay	United States; Talitha Diggs; Abby Steiner; Britton Wilson; Sydney McLaughlin; Allyson Felix*; Kaylin Whitney*; Jaide Stepter Baynes*	3:17.79 WL	Jamaica; Candice McLeod; Janieve Russell; Stephenie Ann McPherson; Charokee Young; Stacey-Ann Williams*; Junelle Bromfield*; Tiffany James*	3:20.74 SB	Great Britain and Northern Ireland; Victoria Ohuruogu; Nicole Yeargin; Jessie Knight; Laviai Nielsen; Ama Pipi*	3:22.64 SB
100 metres hurdles	Tobi Amusan; Nigeria	12.06 w	Britany Anderson; Jamaica	12.23 w	Jasmine Camacho-Quinn; Puerto Rico	12.23 w
400 metres hurdles	Sydney McLaughlin; United States	50.68 WR	Femke Bol; Netherlands	52.27 SB	Dalilah Muhammad; United States	53.13 SB
3000 metres steeplechase	Norah Jeruto; Kazakhstan	8:53.02 CR, WL	Werkuha Getachew; Ethiopia	8:54.61 NR	Mekides Abebe; Ethiopia	8:56.08 PB
Marathon	Gotytom Gebreslase; Ethiopia	2:18:11 CR	Judith Korir; Kenya	2:18:20 PB	Lonah Salpeter; Israel	2:20:18
20 kilometres walk	Kimberly García; Peru	1:26:58 NR	Katarzyna Zdziebło; Poland	1:27:31 NR	Qieyang Shijie; China	1:27:56
35 kilometres walk	Kimberly García; Peru	2:39:16 CR, AR	Katarzyna Zdziebło; Poland	2:40:03 PB	Qieyang Shijie; China	2:40:37 AR
High jump	Eleanor Patterson; Australia	2.02 m =AR	Yaroslava Mahuchikh; Ukraine	2.02 m	Elena Vallortigara; Italy	2.00 m SB
Pole vault	Katie Nageotte; United States	4.85 m WL	Sandi Morris; United States	4.85 m WL	Nina Kennedy; Australia	4.80 m SB
Long jump	Malaika Mihambo; Germany	7.12 m SB	Ese Brume; Nigeria	7.02 m SB	Leticia Oro Melo; Brazil	6.89 m PB
Triple jump	Yulimar Rojas; Venezuela	15.47 m WL	Shanieka Ricketts; Jamaica	14.89 m SB	Tori Franklin; United States	14.72 m SB
Shot put	Chase Ealey; United States	20.49 m	Gong Lijiao; China	20.39 m	Jessica Schilder; Netherlands	19.77 m
Discus throw	Feng Bin; China	69.12 m PB	Sandra Perković; Croatia	68.45 m SB	Valarie Allman; United States	68.30 m
Javelin throw	Kelsey-Lee Barber; Australia	66.91 m WL	Kara Winger; United States	64.05 m	Haruka Kitaguchi; Japan	63.27 m
Hammer throw	Brooke Andersen; United States	78.96 m	Camryn Rogers; Canada	75.52 m	Janee' Kassanavoid; United States	74.86 m
Heptathlon	Nafissatou Thiam; Belgium	6947 WL	Anouk Vetter; Netherlands	6867 NR	Anna Hall; United States	6755 PB
WR world record | AR area record | CR championship record | GR games record | NR national record | OR Olympic record | PB personal best | SB season best | WL world leading (in a given season)

* Indicates the athletes only competed in the preliminary heats and received medals

=== Mixed ===
Event	Gold		Silver		Bronze	
4 × 400 metres relay	Dominican Republic; Lidio Andrés Feliz; Marileidy Paulino; Alexander Ogando; Fiordaliza Cofil	3:09.82 WL	Netherlands; Liemarvin Bonevacia; Lieke Klaver; Tony van Diepen; Femke Bol; Eveline Saalberg*	3:09.90 NR	United States; Elija Godwin; Allyson Felix; Vernon Norwood; Kennedy Simon; Wadeline Jonathas*	3:10.16 SB

* Indicates the athletes only competed in the preliminary heats and received medals

=== World Team ===
Event	Gold		Silver		Bronze	
World Team	United States	328 pts	Jamaica	110 pts	Ethiopia	106 pts

== Entry standards ==
World Athletics announced that athletes would qualify by their World Athletics Rankings position, wild card (reigning world champion or 2021 Diamond League winner) or by achieving the entry standard.

To qualify as a Wild Card you had to be one of the following things:

- Reigning World Outdoor Champion
- Winner of the 2021 Diamond League
- By finishing position at designated competitions (Area competitions)
- Leader (as at closing date of the qualification period):
  - IAAF Hammer Throw Challenge
  - World Athletics Challenge - Race Walking
  - World Athletics Challenge - Combined Events

Countries who had no male and/or no female athletes who had achieved the Entry Standard or considered as having achieved the entry standard (see above) or a qualified relay team, could enter one unqualified male athlete OR one unqualified female athlete in one event of the championships (except the road events and field events, combined events, 10,000 m and 3000 m steeplechase).

Event	Men	Quota	Women	Quota
100 metres	10.05	48	11.15	48
200 metres	20.24	56	22.80	56
400 metres	44.90	48	51.35	48
800 metres	1:45.20	48	1:59.50	48
1500 metres	3:35.00	45	4:04.20	45
5000 metres	13:13.50	42	15:10.00	42
10,000 metres	27:28.00	27	31:25.00	27
Marathon	2:11:30	100	2:29:30	100
3000 metres steeplechase	8:22.00	45	9:30.00	45
110/100 metres hurdles	13.32	40	12.84	40
400 metres hurdles	48.90	40	55.40	40
High jump	2.33	32	1.96	32
Pole vault	5.80	32	4.70	32
Long jump	8.22	32	6.82	32
Triple jump	17.14	32	14.32	32
Shot put	21.10	32	18.50	32
Discus throw	66.00	32	63.50	32
Hammer throw	77.50	32	72.50	32
Javelin throw	85.00	32	64.00	32
Decathlon/Heptathlon	8350	24	6420	24
20 kilometres race walk	1:21:00	60	1:31:00	60
35 kilometres race walk	2:33:00 (3:50:00 for 50 km)	60	2:54:00 (4:25:00 for 50 km)	60
4 × 100 metres relay	Top 10 at the 2021 World Athletics Relays + 6 from Top Lists	16	Top 10 at the 2021 World Athletics Relays + 6 from Top Lists	16
4 × 400 metres relay	Top 10 at the 2021 World Athletics Relays + 6 from Top Lists	16	Top 10 at the 2021 World Athletics Relays + 6 from Top Lists	16
4 × 400 metres relay mixed	Top 12 at the 2021 World Athletics Relays + 4 from Top Lists	16	Top 12 at the 2021 World Athletics Relays + 4 from Top Lists	16

=== Target numbers ===
At the end of the qualification period, the 2021 World Athletics Rankings were published. They were used to invite additional athletes to the World Championships where the target number of athletes had not been achieved for that event through other methods of qualification.

The maximum of three athletes per country in individual events was not affected by this rule. Member federations retained the right to confirm or reject athlete selections through this method.

Where the highest ranked athletes were from a country that already had three entrants for the event, or where member federations had rejected an entrant, the next highest ranked athlete became eligible for entry via the world rankings.

=== Area Champions ===
The following regulations shall applied for Automatic Qualification to the 2022 World Athletics Championships (not applicable for relays and marathon).
1. The Area Champion (in each individual event to be contested at the World Championships) automatically qualifies for the World Championships, irrespective of whether his performance has reached the Entry Standard. This does not apply to 10,000 m, 3000 m Steeplechase, Combined Events, Field Events and Road Events where the entry of the athlete will be subject to the approval of the Technical Delegates
2. The Area Champion shall be the one who has achieved the title either in 2020, 2021 or 2022
3. The Member Federation of the Area Champion will have the ultimate authority to enter the athlete or not, based on its own domestic standard or qualification system
4. If the Member Federation of the Area Champion enters the athlete, he will be considered as having achieved the Entry Standard
5. If the Area Champion, for whatever reason, is not entered, his quota will not be delegated to the second placed athlete and the normal entry rules and conditions apply
6. For those Area Championships that do not have certain events, the Area Associations can organize alternate Area-specific event Championships with conditions conforming to Area Championships Regulations. World Athletics shall be notified of such alternative Championships at least one month in advance of the events being held

== Schedule ==
Event schedule
Friday July 15, 2022
Time (PDT)	Gender	Event	Division Round
9:05	M	Hammer Throw	Group A
10:10	M	High Jump	Qualification
10:30	M	Hammer Throw	Group B
11:45	Mixed	4 × 400 Metres Relay	Heats
12:05	W	Hammer Throw	Group A
12:30	M	100 Metres	Preliminary Round
13:10	W	20 Kilometres Race Walk	Final
13:30	W	Hammer Throw	Group B
15:10	M	20 Kilometres Race Walk	Final
17:05	W	Shot Put	Qualification
17:15	M	3000 Metres Steeplechase	Heats
17:20	W	Pole Vault	Qualification
18:00	M	Long Jump	Qualification
18:10	W	1500 Metres	Heats
18:50	M	100 Metres	Heats
18:55	M	Shot Put	Qualification
19:50	Mixed	4 × 400 Metres Relay	Final
Saturday July 16, 2022
Time (PDT)	Gender	Event	Division Round
10:35	W	3000 Metres Steeplechase	Heats
10:40	W	Triple Jump	Qualification
11:10	W	High Jump	Qualification
11:25	M	110 Metres Hurdles	Heats
12:00	M	Hammer Throw	Final
12:20	W	10,000 Metres	Final
13:20	M	400 Metres Hurdles	Heats
17:10	W	100 Metres	Heats
18:00	M	100 Metres	Semi-Final
18:20	W	Shot Put	Final
18:25	M	Long Jump	Final
18:30	M	1500 Metres	Heats
19:05	W	1500 Metres	Semi-Final
19:50	M	100 Metres	Final
Sunday July 17, 2022
Time (PDT)	Gender	Event	Division Round
6:15	M	Marathon	Final
10:35	W	100 Metres Hurdles	Heptathlon
11:05	M	400 Metres	Heats
11:35	W	High Jump	Heptathlon
11:35	W	Hammer Throw	Final
12:00	W	400 Metres	Heats
13:00	M	10,000 Metres	Final
13:45	W	Shot Put	Heptathlon
17:05	M	110 Metres Hurdles	Semi-Final
17:05	M	Discus Throw	Group A
17:25	W	Pole Vault	Final
17:33	W	100 Metres	Semi-Final
18:03	M	400 Metres Hurdles	Semi-Final
18:27	M	Shot Put	Final
18:30	M	Discus Throw	Group B
18:38	W	200 Metres	Heptathlon
19:00	M	1500 Metres	Semi-Final
19:30	M	110 Metres Hurdles	Final
19:50	W	100 Metres	Final
Monday July 18, 2022
Time (PDT)	Gender	Event	Division Round
6:15	W	Marathon	Final
9:35	W	Long Jump	Heptathlon
10:50	W	Javelin Throw	Heptathlon Group A
12:05	W	Javelin Throw	Heptathlon Group B
17:05	M	200 Metres	Heats
17:10	W	Discus Throw	Group A
17:45	M	High Jump	Final
18:00	W	200 Metres	Heats
18:30	W	Triple Jump	Final
18:35	W	Discus Throw	Group B
18:55	W	800 Metres	Heptathlon
19:20	M	3000 Metres Steeplechase	Final
19:50	W	1500 Metres	Final
Tuesday July 19, 2022
Time (PDT)	Gender	Event	Division Round
17:15	W	400 Metres Hurdles	Heats
17:40	W	High Jump	Final
18:05	W	200 Metres	Semi-Final
18:33	M	Discus Throw	Final
18:50	M	200 Metres	Semi-Final
19:30	M	1500 Metres	Final
19:50	M	400 Metres Hurdles	Final

Wednesday July 20, 2022
Time (PDT)	Gender	Event	Division Round
15:20	W	Javelin Throw	Group A
16:25	W	5000 Metres	Heats
16:50	W	Javelin Throw	Group B
17:20	M	800 Metres	Heats
18:15	W	400 Metres Hurdles	Semi-Final
18:30	W	Discus Throw	Final
18:45	W	400 Metres	Semi-Final
19:15	M	400 Metres	Semi-Final
19:45	W	3000 Metres Steeplechase	Final
Thursday July 21, 2022
Time (PDT)	Gender	Event	Division Round
17:05	M	Javelin Throw	Group A
17:10	W	800 Metres	Heats
18:10	M	5000 Metres	Heats
18:20	M	Triple Jump	Qualification
18:45	M	Javelin Throw	Group B
19:00	M	800 Metres	Semi-Final
19:35	W	200 Metres	Final
19:50	M	200 Metres	Final
Friday July 22, 2022
Time (PDT)	Gender	Event	Division Round
6:15	W	35 Kilometres Race Walk	Final
17:05	M	Pole Vault	Qualification
17:40	W	4 × 100 Metres Relay	Heats
18:05	M	4 × 100 Metres Relay	Heats
18:20	W	Javelin Throw	Final
18:35	W	800 Metres	Semi-Final
19:15	W	400 Metres	Final
19:35	M	400 Metres	Final
19:50	W	400 Metres Hurdles	Final
Saturday July 23, 2022
Time (PDT)	Gender	Event	Division Round
9:50	M	100 Metres	Decathlon
10:40	M	Long Jump	Decathlon
11:20	W	100 Metres Hurdles	Heats
12:00	W	Long Jump	Qualification
12:10	M	Shot Put	Decathlon
16:10	M	High Jump	Decathlon
17:10	W	4 × 400 Metres Relay	Heats
17:45	M	4 × 400 Metres Relay	Heats
18:05	M	Triple Jump	Final
18:10	M	800 Metres	Final
18:25	W	5000 Metres	Final
18:35	M	Javelin Throw	Final
18:55	M	400 Metres	Decathlon
19:30	W	4 × 100 Metres Relay	Final
19:50	M	4 × 100 Metres Relay	Final
Sunday July 24, 2022
Time (PDT)	Gender	Event	Division Round
6:15	M	35 Kilometres Race Walk	Final
9:35	M	110 Metres Hurdles	Decathlon
10:30	M	Discus Throw	Decathlon Group A
11:40	M	Discus Throw	Decathlon Group B
12:15	M	Pole Vault	Decathlon Group A
13:15	M	Pole Vault	Decathlon Group B
17:05	W	100 Metres Hurdles	Semi-Final
17:05	M	Javelin Throw	Decathlon Group A
17:25	M	Pole Vault	Final
17:55	W	Long Jump	Final
18:05	M	5000 Metres	Final
18:10	M	Javelin Throw	Decathlon Group B
18:35	W	800 Metres	Final
19:00	W	100 Metres Hurdles	Final
19:20	M	1500 Metres	Decathlon
19:35	M	4 × 400 Metres Relay	Final
19:50	W	4 × 400 Metres Relay	Final

== Participating nations ==
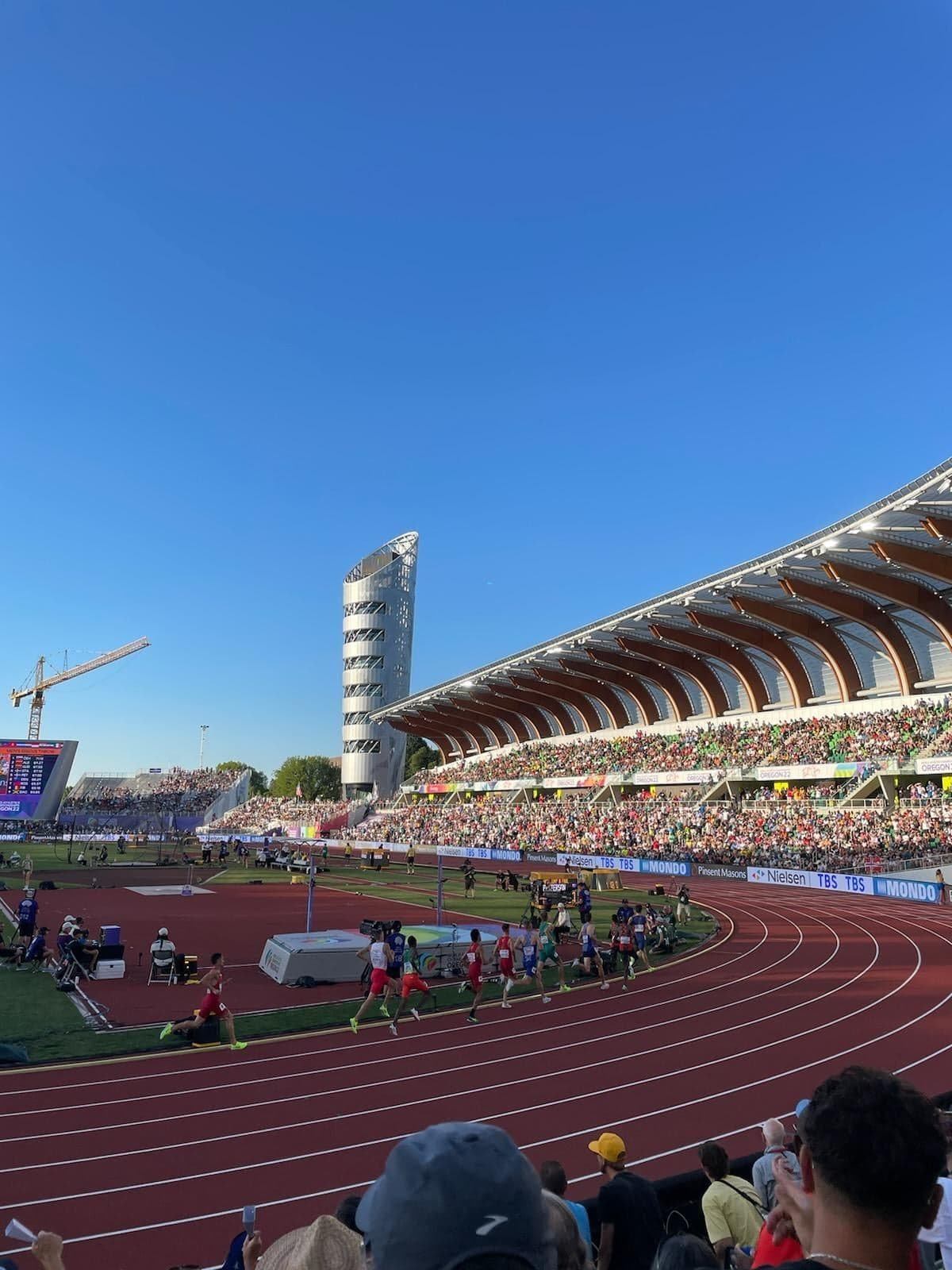
The 1500 meter final at the 2022 World Athletics Championship at Hayward Field, Eugene, Oregon

1,972 athletes from 192 member federations were scheduled to compete at the championships, but owing to vaccination requirements and resulting visa issues the final total was reduced to 179 nations (plus the Athlete Refugee Team) and more than 1,700 athletes, the lowest number since 1991 for the former and 2005 for the latter.

A record 29 countries won at least one gold medal during the championships. Peru, Kazakhstan, and Nigeria won their first-ever gold medals, while India and Burkina Faso had their best medal performances, with silver, and the Philippines with bronze.

- Afghanistan (1)
- Albania (1)
- Algeria (8)
- American Samoa (1)
- Angola (1)
- Anguilla (1)
- Antigua and Barbuda (2)
- Argentina (11)
- Armenia (1)
- Aruba (1)
- Athlete Refugee Team (3)
- Australia (65)
- Austria (4)
- Azerbaijan (2)
- Bahamas (17)
- Bahrain (6)
- Bangladesh (1)
- Barbados (3)
- Belgium (32)
- Belize (1)
- Benin (2)
- Bermuda (1)
- Bhutan (1)
- Bolivia (3)
- Bosnia and Herzegovina (1)
- Botswana (9)
- Brazil (58)
- British Virgin Islands (2)
- Bulgaria (1)
- Burkina Faso (2)
- Burundi (4)
- Cameroon (0)
- Canada (59)
- Cape Verde (1)
- Cayman Islands (1)
- Chile (6)
- China (53)
- Chinese Taipei (3)
- Colombia (14)
- Comoros (1)
- Cook Islands (1)
- Costa Rica (3)
- Croatia (5)
- Cuba (16)
- Cyprus (4)
- Czech Republic (24)
- Denmark (16)
- Djibouti (1)
- Dominica (2)
- Dominican Republic (12)
- Democratic Republic of the Congo (1)
- (Timor-Leste) East Timor (1)
- Ecuador (20)
- Egypt (4)
- El Salvador (1)
- Eritrea (10)
- Estonia (5)
- Eswatini (1)
- Ethiopia (40)
- Federated States of Micronesia (1)
- Fiji (1)
- Finland (37)
- France (45)
- French Polynesia (1)
- Gabon (1)
- The Gambia (2)
- Germany (88)
- Ghana (7)
- Gibraltar (1)
- Great Britain and Northern Ireland (81)
- Greece (19)
- Grenada (3)
- Guam (1)
- Guatemala (9)
- Guyana (3)
- Haiti (1)
- Honduras (1)
- Hong Kong (1)
- Hungary (2)
- Iceland (1)
- India (21)
- Indonesia (1)
- Iraq (1)
- Ireland (22)
- Israel (10)
- Italy (60)
- Ivory Coast (6)
- Jamaica (65)
- Japan (68)
- Jordan (1)
- Kazakhstan (12)
- Kenya (46)
- Kiribati (1)
- Kosovo (1)
- Kuwait (2)
- Kyrgyzstan (1)
- Latvia (6)
- Lebanon (1)
- Lesotho (1)
- Liberia (4)
- Lithuania (9)
- Luxembourg (2)
- Madagascar (1)
- Malaysia (2)
- Maldives (1)
- Mali (1)
- Malta (1)
- Marshall Islands (1)
- Mauritius (1)
- Mexico (25)
- Moldova (5)
- Mongolia (4)
- Montenegro (1)
- Morocco (15)
- Namibia (1)
- Nepal (1)
- Netherlands (36)
- New Zealand (20)
- Nicaragua (1)
- Niger (1)
- Nigeria (24)
- North Macedonia (1)
- Northern Mariana Islands (1)
- Norway (21)
- Oman (1)
- Pakistan (1)
- Palau (1)
- Palestine (1)
- Panama (3)
- Papua New Guinea (1)
- Paraguay (1)
- Peru (8)
- Philippines (1)
- Poland (45)
- Portugal (23)
- Puerto Rico (8)
- Qatar (3)
- Romania (8)
- Saint Kitts and Nevis (1)
- Saint Lucia (1)
- Saint Vincent and the Grenadines (1)
- Samoa (1)
- San Marino (1)
- Saudi Arabia (2)
- Senegal (1)
- Serbia (3)
- Seychelles (1)
- Sierra Leone (1)
- Singapore (1)
- Slovakia (5)
- Slovenia (10)
- Solomon Islands (1)
- South Africa (43)
- South Korea (3)
- South Sudan (1)
- Spain (61)
- Sri Lanka (3)
- Sudan (1)
- Sweden (22)
- Switzerland (26)
- Syria (1)
- Tajikistan (1)
- Tanzania (1)
- Thailand (1)
- Togo (1)
- Tonga (1)
- Trinidad and Tobago (11)
- Tunisia (5)
- Turkey (8)
- Turks and Caicos Islands (1)
- Tuvalu (1)
- Uganda (17)
- Ukraine (22)
- United States (151) (hosts)
- Uruguay (5)
- Virgin Islands (1)
- Uzbekistan (1)
- Vanuatu (1)
- Venezuela (4)
- Vietnam (1)
- Zambia (2)
- Zimbabwe (3)

== Prize money ==
There was a world record programme where if a world record was broken the athlete who broke it would get $100,000.

A total amount of $8,498,000 was also offered by World Athletics to finalists at Oregon 2022, of which $2 million has been ringfenced from the fines paid by the Russian Athletics Federation (for doping rules offenses).

The prize money is as follows:

Individual events

- Gold: $70,000
- Silver: $35,000
- Bronze: $22,000
- Fourth place: $16,000
- Fifth place: $11,000
- Sixth place: $7,000
- Seventh place: $6,000
- Eighth place: $5,000

Relays (per each team)

- Gold: $80,000
- Silver: $40,000
- Bronze: $20,000
- Fourth place: $16,000
- Fifth place: $12,000
- Sixth place: $8,000
- Seventh place: $6,000
- Eighth place: $4,000

== Media coverage ==
The event was streamed live in some territories on the World Athletics YouTube and Facebook channels.

The broadcast opening title sequence was created by University of Oregon freshman Quinn Connell.

The event was the most watched World Athletics Championships in US television history, reaching an excess of 13.7 million viewers.

=== International broadcasters ===
- Arena Sport: Bosnia, Croatia, Kosovo, North Macedonia, Montenegro, Serbia, Slovenia
- beIN Sports: MENA Region
- ESPN International: Latin America (except Brazil)
- NBC Sports: Puerto Rico, US Virgin Islands and United States
- Sportv: Brazil
- SuperSport, TVMS: Pan Sub-Saharan Africa
- TV Jamaica: Pan Caribbean
- TyC Sports: Argentina, Bolivia, Chile, Colombia, Costa Rica, Ecuador, El Salvador, Guatemala, Honduras, Nicaragua, Panama, Paraguay, Peru, Uruguay, Venezuela (except Brazil)

=== National broadcasters ===
- Antigua and Barbuda: ABS
- Australia: SBS
- Austria: ORF
- Bahamas: ZNS
- Barbados: CBC
- Belarus: BTRC
- Belgium: RTBF, VRT
- Botswana: BTV
- Brazil: Sportv
- Burkina Faso: RTB
- Canada: CBC Sports
- Cape Verde: TCV
- Cayman Islands: TVJi
- Chile: TVN
- China: CCTV
- Colombia: RTVC
- Comoros: ORTC
- Costa Rica: Tigo Sports
- Croatia: HRT
- Cuba: ICRT
- Cyprus: CYCBC
- Czech Republic: CT
- Democratic Republic of Congo: RTNC
- Denmark: TV2
- Equador: Spring Media
- Estonia: ERR
- Eswatini: Eswatini TV
- Ethiopia: EBC
- Finland: YLE
- France: FT
- Gambia: GRTS
- Germany: ARD, ZDF
- Ghana: GTV
- Greece: ERT
- Grenada: GBN
- Honduras: Spring Media
- Hungary: MTVA
- Iceland: RUV
- India: Sony Pictures Sports Network
- Indonesia: TVRI
- Israel: The Sports Channel
- Italy: RAI, Sky
- Jamaica: Television Jamaica
- Japan: TBS
- Kenya: KBC
- Latvia: LT
- Liberia: LNTV
- Lithuania: LRT
- Madagascar: TVM
- Malawi: MBC
- Malaysia and Brunei: ASTRO
- Mauritius: MBC
- Mexico: Claro Sports
- Morocco: SNRT
- Namibia: NBC
- Netherlands: NOS
- New Zealand: Sky Network NZ
- Nigeria: NTA Sports 24
- Norway: NRK
- Panama: Medcom
- Peru: Spring Media
- Poland: TVP
- Portugal: RTP
- Romania: TVR
- Rwanda: RTV
- Senegal: RTS
- Seychelles: SBC
- Slovenia: RTVS
- South Africa: SABC
- South Korea: Sky Sports
- Spain: TVE
- St Lucia: Winners TV
- Sweden: SVT
- Switzerland: SRG, SSR
- Türkiye: TRT
- Uganda: UBC
- Ukraine: UA:PBC
- United Kingdom: BBC Sport
- Uruguay: VTV
- Venezuela: Meridiano
