= 2024 European Athletics Championships – Women's discus throw =

Women's discus throw at the 2024 European Athletics Championships
- Venue: Stadio Olimpico
- Location: Rome
- Dates: 7 June (qualification) 8 June (final)
- Competitors: 28 from 14 nations
- Winning distance: 67.04 m

Medalists
gold medal	Sandra Elkasević	Croatia
silver medal	Jorinde van Klinken	Netherlands
bronze medal	Liliana Cá	Portugal

The women's discus throw at the 2024 European Athletics Championships took place at the Stadio Olimpico on 7 June and 8 June.

== Records ==
Standing records prior to the 2024 European Athletics Championships
World record	Gabriele Reinsch (GDR)	76.80 m	Neubrandenburg, East Germany	9 July 1988
European record	Gabriele Reinsch (GDR)	76.80 m	Neubrandenburg, East Germany	9 July 1988
Championship record	Diana Gansky (GDR)	71.36 m	Stuttgart, West Germany	28 August 1986
World Leading	Yaimé Pérez (CUB)	73.09 m	Ramona, United States	13 April 2024
Europe Leading	Marike Steinacker (GER)	67.31 m	Wiesbaden, Germany	11 May 2024

== Schedule ==
Date	Time	Round
7 June 2024	12:15	Qualification
8 June 2024	21:37	Final

All times are local times (UTC+2)

== Results ==
=== Qualification ===
Qualification: 62.50 m (Q) or best 12 performers (q)

Rank	Group	Name	Nationality	#1	#2	#3	Result	Note
1	A	Sandra Elkasević	Croatia	58.54	65.62		65.62	Q
2	A	Jorinde van Klinken	Netherlands	56.11	65.12		65.12	Q, SB
3	A	Liliana Cá	Portugal	64.72			64.72	Q, SB
4	B	Marike Steinacker	Germany	59.98	59.61	63.30	63.30	Q
5	A	Shanice Craft	Germany	62.44	x	x	62.44	q
6	B	Melina Robert-Michon	France	59.68	60.71	61.90	61.90	q
7	B	Irina Rodrigues	Portugal	60.43	61.32	58.28	61.32	q
8	B	Caisa-Marie Lindfors	Sweden	59.89	61.22	x	61.22	q
9	B	Claudine Vita	Germany	60.46	60.96	x	60.96	q
10	A	Vanessa Kamga	Sweden	x	59.26	60.88	60.88	q
11	B	Marija Tolj	Croatia	57.72	60.67	60.65	60.67	q
12	B	Alexandra Emilianov	Moldova	60.65	x	x	60.65	q
13	A	Daisy Osakue	Italy	60.10	58.48	60.03	60.10	
14	A	Daria Zabawska	Poland	56.88	59.02	58.66	59.02	
15	B	Lisa Brix Pedersen	Denmark	51.62	57.64	x	57.64	
16	A	Amanda Ngandu-Ntumba	France	56.78	57.07	56.03	57.07	
17	A	Stefania Strumillo	Italy	57.04	53.81	55.18	57.04	
18	A	Lucija Leko	Croatia	53.50	56.97	52.70	56.97	PB
19	A	Ieva Gumbs	Lithuania	53.48	56.56	54.67	56.56	
20	A	Annesofie Hartmann Nielsen	Denmark	55.72	x	55.73	55.73	
21	B	Özlem Becerek	Turkey	x	53.52	55.73	55.73	
22	B	Weronika Muszyńska	Poland	55.62	x	53.02	55.62	
23	A	Karolina Urban	Poland	55.47	x	54.21	55.47	
24	A	Helena Leveelahti	Finland	x	55.22	52.66	55.22	
25	B	Salla Sipponen	Finland	54.58	54.24	54.92	54.92	=SB
26	B	Dóra Kerekes	Hungary	52.92	47.08	51.15	52.92	
27	B	Emma Ljungberg	Sweden	51.98	x	x	51.98	
	B	Emily Conte	Italy	x	x	x	NM	

=== Final ===
The final was started on 8 June at 21:37.

The results were revised after it was determined that the third attempt of Vanessa Kamga was incorrectly recorded as it would have been "closer to 60m than the distance recorded". Had it been recorded correctly, Kamga would not have been in the top eight after the first three rounds and would not have qualified for the final three attempts. Thus, her fourth, fifth, and sixth throws were annulled and her original fifth place was changed to a ninth place.

Rank	Name	Nationality	#1	#2	#3	#4	#5	#6	Result	Note
1st place, gold medalist(s)	Sandra Elkasević	Croatia	67.04	x	65.40	66.34	x	62.25	67.04	SB
2nd place, silver medalist(s)	Jorinde van Klinken	Netherlands	61.68	63.21	64.47	63.37	x	65.99	65.99	SB
3rd place, bronze medalist(s)	Liliana Cá	Portugal	61.42	64.53	x	61.43	x	63.09	64.53	
4	Irina Rodrigues	Portugal	62.09	60.78	62.76	62.23	x	61.28	62.76	
5	Claudine Vita	Germany	60.45	61.59	62.65	61.99	62.52	x	62.65	
6	Shanice Craft	Germany	59.51	60.28	61.73	x	59.93	60.05	61.73	
7	Melina Robert-Michon	France	60.87	60.53	60.70	61.65	59.87	x	61.65	
8	Marija Tolj	Croatia	60.76	61.27	x	61.42	x	x	61.42	
9	Vanessa Kamga	Sweden	60.62	x	~~61.68~~	~~62.71~~	~~x~~	~~61.28~~	60.62	~~PB~~
10	Caisa-Marie Lindfors	Sweden	59.31	60.28	x				60.28	
11	Alexandra Emilianov	Moldova	60.24	x	59.30				60.24	
12	Marike Steinacker	Germany	x	59.72	52.62				59.72	
