= 2022 European Athletics Championships – Women's discus throw =

Women's discus throw at the 2022 European Athletics Championships
- Venue: Olympiastadion
- Location: Munich
- Dates: August 15 (qualification); August 16 (final)
- Competitors: 25 from 16 nations
- Winning distance: 67.95

Medalists
gold medal	Sandra Perković	Croatia
silver medal	Kristin Pudenz	Germany
bronze medal	Claudine Vita	Germany

The women's discus throw at the 2022 European Athletics Championships took place at the Olympiastadion on 15 and 16 August.

== Records ==
Standing records prior to the 2022 European Athletics Championships
World record	Gabriele Reinsch (GDR)	76.80 m	Neubrandenburg, East Germany	9 July 1988
European record	Gabriele Reinsch (GDR)	76.80 m	Neubrandenburg, East Germany	9 July 1988
Championship record	Diana Gansky (GDR)	71.36 m	Stuttgart, West Germany	28 August 1986
World Leading	Valarie Allman (USA)	71.46 m	San Diego, United States	8 April 2022
Europe Leading	Sandra Perković (CRO)	68.45 m	Eugene, United States	20 July 2022

== Schedule ==
Date	Time	Round
15 August 2022	18:15	Qualification
16 August 2022	20:55	Final

All times are local times (UTC+2)

== Results ==
=== Qualification ===
Qualification: 63.50 m (Q) or best 12 performers (q)

Rank	Group	Name	Nationality	#1	#2	#3	Result	Note
1	A	Sandra Perković	Croatia	62.67	x	65.94	65.94	Q
2	B	Liliana Cá	Portugal	58.60	62.78	65.21	65.21	Q, SB
3	B	Kristin Pudenz	Germany	64.25			64.25	Q
4	A	Claudine Vita	Germany	62.59	62.77	63.51	63.51	Q
5	A	Shanice Craft	Germany	60.89	60.57	62.64	62.64	q
6	B	Marija Tolj	Croatia	54.75	60.84	62.51	62.51	q
7	A	Jorinde van Klinken	Netherlands	x	x	62.18	62.18	q
8	B	Lisa Brix Pedersen	Denmark	57.46	52.46	59.40	59.40	q
9	A	Mélina Robert-Michon	France	58.85	56.59	54.22	58.85	q
10	B	Chrysoula Anagnostopoulou	Greece	58.13	53.81	55.57	58.13	q
11	A	Jade Lally	Great Britain	56.55	57.19	57.68	57.68	q
12	A	Irina Rodrigues	Portugal	56.23	57.04	x	57.04	q
13	B	Stefania Strumillo	Italy	56.90	55.43	54.95	56.90	
14	B	Ieva Zarankaitė	Lithuania	55.22	55.66	56.85	56.85	
15	A	Daria Zabawska	Poland	54.60	56.54	x	56.54	
16	A	Daisy Osakue	Italy	56.54	x	x	56.54	
17	A	Salla Sipponen	Finland	x	53.29	56.47	56.47	
18	B	Alida van Daalen	Netherlands	x	56.05	x	56.05	
19	B	Özlem Becerek	Turkey	52.78	56.01	x	56.01	
20	A	Dragana Tomašević	Serbia	53.95	53.43	55.51	55.51	
21	B	Kirsty Law	Great Britain	52.31	54.83	x	54.83	
22	B	Amanda Ngandu-Ntumba	France	x	53.00	54.70	54.70	
23	B	Karolina Urban	Poland	54.33	50.38	53.82	54.33	
24	A	Androniki Lada	Cyprus	52.80	48.91	49.82	52.80	
25	A	Vanessa Kamga	Sweden	x	51.66	49.32	51.66	

=== Final ===
Rank	Name	Nationality	#1	#2	#3	#4	#5	#6	Result	Note
1st place, gold medalist(s)	Sandra Perković	Croatia	x	65.77	x	x	67.95	x	67.95	
2nd place, silver medalist(s)	Kristin Pudenz	Germany	62.44	65.05	66.93	x	67.87	63.68	67.87	PB
3rd place, bronze medalist(s)	Claudine Vita	Germany	63.24	63.21	65.20	65.12	63.73	63.97	65.20	SB
4	Jorinde van Klinken	Netherlands	64.03	x	59.53	x	64.43	x	64.43	
5	Liliana Cá	Portugal	63.67	61.70	63.38	x	x	x	63.67	
6	Marija Tolj	Croatia	57.57	x	55.73	x	63.37	61.67	63.37	
7	Shanice Craft	Germany	62.55	62.11	62.64	61.97	62.78	x	62.78	
8	Mélina Robert-Michon	France	56.99	57.89	60.60	x	x	x	60.60	
9	Jade Lally	Great Britain	54.83	56.56	57.08				57.08	
10	Lisa Brix Pedersen	Denmark	55.72	56.05	57.02				57.02	
11	Irina Rodrigues	Portugal	54.85	54.07	56.23				56.23	
12	Chrysoula Anagnostopoulou	Greece	x	55.06	56.10				56.10	
