= 2018 European Athletics Championships – Women's discus throw =

Women's discus throw at the 2018 European Athletics Championships
- Venue: Olympic Stadium
- Location: Berlin
- Dates: August 9 (qualification); August 11 (final)
- Competitors: 29 from 20 nations
- Winning results: 67.62

Medalists
| gold medal | Sandra Perković | Croatia |
| silver medal | Nadine Müller | Germany |
| bronze medal | Shanice Craft | Germany |

The women's discus throw at the 2018 European Athletics Championships took place at the Olympic Stadium on 9 and 11 August.

== Records ==
Standing records prior to the 2018 European Athletics Championships
| World record | Gabriele Reinsch (GDR) | 76.80 m | Neubrandenburg, East Germany | 9 July 1988 |
| European record | Gabriele Reinsch (GDR) | 76.80 m | Neubrandenburg, East Germany | 9 July 1988 |
| Championship record | Diana Gansky (GDR) | 71.36 m | Stuttgart, West Germany | 28 August 1986 |
| World Leading | Sandra Perković (CRO) | 71.38 m | Doha, Qatar | 4 May 2018 |
| European Leading | Sandra Perković (CRO) | 71.38 m | Doha, Qatar | 4 May 2018 |

== Schedule ==
| Date | Time | Round |
|---|---|---|
| 9 August 2018 | 9:30 | Qualification |
| 11 August 2018 | 20:20 | Final |

All times are local times (UTC+2)

== Results ==
=== Qualification ===
Qualification: 58.50 m (Q) or best 12 performers (q)

| Rank | Group | Name | Nationality | #1 | #2 | #3 | Result | Note |
|---|---|---|---|---|---|---|---|---|
| 1 | B | Sandra Perković | Croatia | 64.54 | | | 64.54 | Q |
| 2 | A | Shanice Craft | Germany | 61.13 | | | 61.13 | Q |
| 3 | B | Nadine Müller | Germany | 60.64 | | | 60.64 | Q |
| 4 | B | Irina Rodrigues | Portugal | 55.15 | 56.38 | 59.22 | 59.22 | Q |
| 5 | A | Claudine Vita | Germany | 59.18 | | | 59.18 | Q |
| 6 | B | Alexandra Emilianov | Moldova | 55.80 | 55.37 | 58.83 | 58.83 | Q |
| 7 | A | Daisy Osakue | Italy | x | 58.73 | | 58.73 | Q |
| 8 | A | Liliana Cá | Portugal | 58.37 | x | x | 58.37 | q |
| 9 | B | Eliška Staňková | Czech Republic | 55.11 | 57.81 | x | 57.81 | q |
| 10 | B | Dragana Tomašević | Serbia | 57.77 | 57.70 | 57.10 | 57.77 | q |
| 11 | B | Jade Lally | Great Britain | 57.71 | 56.47 | 56.03 | 57.71 | q |
| 12 | A | Hrisoula Anagnostopoulou | Greece | x | 53.30 | 56.52 | 56.52 | q |
| 13 | A | Kristina Rakočević | Montenegro | 54.68 | 55.90 | x | 55.90 | |
| 14 | B | Corinne Nugter | Netherlands | 54.02 | x | 55.70 | 55.70 | |
| 15 | B | Sabina Asenjo | Spain | 53.81 | 55.57 | 55.01 | 55.57 | |
| 16 | A | Marija Tolj | Croatia | x | 52.79 | 55.52 | 55.52 | |
| 17 | B | Valentina Aniballi | Italy | 55.06 | 54.12 | x | 55.06 | |
| 18 | A | Vanessa Kamga | Sweden | 36.55 | 54.88 | x | 54.88 | |
| 19 | B | Sanna Kämäräinen | Finland | 54.76 | x | 54.43 | 54.76 | |
| 20 | A | Jorinde van Klinken | Netherlands | 53.21 | 54.33 | x | 54.33 | |
| 21 | B | Salla Sipponen | Finland | 54.00 | 53.66 | 51.66 | 54.00 | |
| 22 | B | Daria Zabawska | Poland | 52.26 | x | 53.94 | 53.94 | |
| 23 | A | Ieva Zarankaitė | Lithuania | 53.91 | x | 52.31 | 53.91 | |
| 24 | A | Helena Leveelahti | Finland | 51.85 | 53.37 | 53.56 | 53.56 | |
| 25 | A | Yuliya Maltseva | Authorised Neutral Athletes | 52.34 | 52.61 | 53.50 | 53.50 | |
| 26 | A | Kirsty Law | Great Britain | 52.31 | 52.37 | 50.18 | 52.37 | |
| 27 | B | Veronika Domjan | Slovenia | 49.89 | x | x | 49.89 | |
| 28 | A | Viktoriya Klochko | Ukraine | x | 49.11 | x | 49.11 | |
| 29 | A | Kätlin Tõllasson | Estonia | 48.58 | x | x | 48.58 | |

=== Final ===
| Rank | Athlete | Nationality | #1 | #2 | #3 | #4 | #5 | #6 | Result | Notes |
|---|---|---|---|---|---|---|---|---|---|---|
| 1st place, gold medalist(s) | Sandra Perković | Croatia | x | 59.09 | 59.97 | x | 67.62 | x | 67.62 | |
| 2nd place, silver medalist(s) | Nadine Müller | Germany | 62.00 | 63.00 | x | 61.99 | 62.58 | x | 63.00 | SB |
| 3rd place, bronze medalist(s) | Shanice Craft | Germany | 56.33 | 59.73 | x | x | x | 62.46 | 62.46 | |
| 4 | Claudine Vita | Germany | x | 57.08 | 61.23 | x | x | 61.25 | 61.25 | |
| 5 | Daisy Osakue | Italy | x | 58.09 | x | x | 59.32 | 56.16 | 59.32 | |
| 6 | Dragana Tomašević | Serbia | 57.19 | 58.94 | 58.42 | 57.76 | x | x | 58.94 | |
| 7 | Liliana Cá | Portugal | x | x | 58.01 | 57.62 | 58.91 | x | 58.91 | |
| 8 | Alexandra Emilianov | Moldova | 57.07 | 56.76 | 58.10 | 57.59 | x | 57.22 | 58.10 | |
| 9 | Irina Rodrigues | Portugal | x | 58.00 | 54.06 | | | | 58.00 | |
| 10 | Hrisoula Anagnostopoulou | Greece | 56.58 | x | 57.34 | | | | 57.34 | |
| 11 | Jade Lally | Great Britain | 55.73 | 57.33 | 56.58 | | | | 57.33 | |
| 12 | Eliška Staňková | Czech Republic | 57.04 | 56.88 | 56.51 | | | | 57.04 | |
