= 2014 European Cup Winter Throwing =

2014 European Throwing Cup
- Events: 16

The 2014 European Cup Winter Throwing was held on 16 and 17 March at the Centro Nacional de Lançamentos (National Throws Centre) and Estádio Municipal in Leiria, Portugal. It was the fourteenth edition of the athletics competition for throwing events and was jointly organised by the European Athletic Association and the Federação Portuguesa de Atletismo. The competition featured men's and women's contests in shot put, discus throw, javelin throw and hammer throw. In addition to the senior competitions, there were also under-23 events for younger athletes.

Two athletes defended their titles from 2013: Latvia's Zigismunds Sirmais retained the men's javelin in 81.60 m (267 ft 8 1/2 in) and Russia's Yevgeniya Kolodko topped the women's shot put with a mark of 18.66 m (61 ft 2 1/2 in). One world-leading mark came in the senior section in the form of Aleksandr Lesnoy's 21.23 m (69 ft 7 3/4 in) in the shot put. Two national records were improved during the two-day event: Dejan Mileusnić had a men's javelin Bosnian and Herzegovinian record with his first round throw of 80.40 m (263 ft 9 1/4 in) while Androniki Lada twice improved the Cypriot record in the discus, throwing 55.08 m (180 ft 8 1/2 in) then 55.66 m (182 ft 7 1/4 in).

The under-23 section had several performers beat the standards set in the senior competitions. Maksym Bohdan set a world lead of 83.41 m (273 ft 7 3/4 in) to win the men's under-23 javelin, while his female counterpart Liina Laasma gave the best javelin performance at the competition overall to win her under-23 event. Quentin Bigot's hammer throw of 74.42 m (244 ft 1 3/4 in) would have been enough for the senior podium and Shanice Craft's mark of 64.16 m (210 ft 5 3/4 in) in the women's under-23 discus was just four centimetres of the senior winner. Montenegro's Danijel Furtula was the under-23 men's discus winner for a third year running.

Russia and Germany were the best in the team competitions, with the former winning the senior and under-23 men's titles and the latter taking both women's team titles.

Leiria was chosen as the host at the European Athletics Executive Board meeting in Lausanne on 17 September 2013.

During the competition the results were provided on a live mode, using Lap2Go technology

== Medal summary ==
=== Men ===
Event	Gold		Silver		Bronze	
Shot put	Aleksandr Lesnoy (RUS)	21.23 m	Marco Fortes (POR)	21.01 m	Georgi Ivanov (BUL)	20.59 m
Discus throw	Viktor Butenko (RUS)	64.38 m	Erik Cadée (NED)	63.56 m	Christoph Harting (GER)	62.56 m
Hammer throw	Paweł Fajdek (POL)	78.75 m	Krisztián Pars (HUN)	77.96 m	Denis Lukyanov (RUS)	74.11 m
Javelin throw	Zigismunds Sirmais (LAT)	81.60 m	Thomas Röhler (GER)	81.17 m	Risto Mätas (EST)	80.58 m

=== Women ===
Event	Gold		Silver		Bronze	
Shot put	Yevgeniya Kolodko (RUS)	18.66 m	Alena Kopets (BLR)	18.58 m	Yulia Leantsiuk (BLR)	18.55 m
Discus throw	Mélina Robert-Michon (FRA)	64.20 m	Anna Rüh (GER)	63.21 m	Dragana Tomašević (SRB)	59.26 m
Hammer throw	Joanna Fiodorow (POL)	72.70 m	Éva Orbán (HUN)	72.49 m	Kathrin Klaas (GER)	70.99 m
Javelin throw	Linda Stahl (GER)	61.20 m	Katharina Molitor (GER)	60.97 m	Martina Ratej (SLO)	59.57 m

=== Under-23 men ===
Event	Gold		Silver		Bronze	
Shot put	Frederic Dagee (FRA)	19.05 m	Mesud Pezer (BIH)	18.68 m	Martin Novák (CZE)	18.68 m
Discus throw	Danijel Furtula (MNE)	62.19 m	Daniel Ståhl (SWE)	57.70 m	Aleksandr Kirya (RUS)	57.52 m
Hammer throw	Quentin Bigot (FRA)	74.42 m	Yevgeniy Korotovskiy (RUS)	70.01 m	Pedro José Martín (ESP)	69.76 m
Javelin throw	Maksym Bohdan (UKR)	83.41 m	Jan Kubeš (CZE)	76.15 m	Yegor Yermoshin (RUS)	74.71 m

=== Under-23 women ===
Event	Gold		Silver		Bronze	
Shot put	Emel Dereli (TUR)	17.33 m	Shanice Craft (GER)	17.16 m	Viktoryia Kolb (BLR)	16.81 m
Discus throw	Shanice Craft (GER)	64.16 m	Viktoriya Klochko (UKR)	53.74 m	Elçin Kaya (TUR)	51.41 m
Hammer throw	Malwina Kopron (POL)	69.30 m	Alyona Shamotina (UKR)	67.87 m	Barbara Špiler (SLO)	67.12 m
Javelin throw	Liina Laasma (EST)	63.17 m	Sara Kolak (CRO)	57.79 m	Prescilla Lecurieux (FRA)	56.91 m

== Team points table ==
Nation	Men points	Women points	Men U23 points	Women U23 points
Russia	4454	4136	4078	3731
Belarus	4243	—	—	—
Italy	4222	—	3611	3593
Ukraine	4195	3796	3842	3820
Estonia	4068	—	—	3627
Portugal	4055	—	3311	3068
Germany	—	4263	3865	4164
France	—	4128	3995	—
Spain	—	4041	—	—
Czech Republic	—	3839	—	—
Sweden	—	—	3795	—
Hungary	—	—	—	3542
