= Athletics at the 2017 Summer Universiade – Women's discus throw =

The women's discus throw event at the 2017 Summer Universiade was held on 23 and 24 August at the Taipei Municipal Stadium.

== Medalists ==
Gold	Silver	Bronze
Kristin Pudenz; Germany	Valarie Allman; United States	Taryn Gollshewsky; Australia

== Results ==
=== Qualification ===
Qualification: 55.00 m (Q) or at least 12 best (q) qualified for the final.

Rank	Group	Athlete	Nationality	#1	#2	#3	Result	Notes
1	A	Valarie Allman	United States	53.12	58.33		58.33	Q
2	A	Kristin Pudenz	Germany	57.20			57.20	Q
3	B	Stefania Strumillo	Italy	52.86	56.65		56.65	Q
4	B	Taryn Gollshewsky	Australia	56.39			56.39	Q
5	B	Ischke Senekal	South Africa	52.80	x	56.04	56.04	Q, SB
6	B	Kaur Kamalpreet	India	52.94	x	55.95	55.95	Q
7	A	Daria Zabawska	Poland	55.43			55.43	Q
8	B	Kätlin Tõllasson	Estonia	53.67	54.83	54.00	54.83	q
9	B	Li Wen-Hua	Chinese Taipei	27.87	53.72	x	53.72	q
10	B	Lidia Augustyniak	Poland	x	x	53.14	53.14	q
11	A	Agnes Esser	Canada	47.66	50.53	52.69	52.69	q
12	A	Salla Sipponen	Finland	x	51.49	x	51.49	q
13	A	Kathrine Bebe	Denmark	49.57	50.99	50.89	50.99	
14	B	Ailen Armada	Argentina	x	45.82	49.54	49.54	
15	B	Christine Bohan	United States	49.49	48.09	x	49.49	
16	A	Wang Lan	China	x	49.39	46.05	49.39	
17	A	Renata Petkova	Bulgaria	46.04	45.81	47.59	47.59	
18	A	Ivana Gallardo	Chile	x	46.27	43.80	46.27	
19	B	Ieva Zarankaitė	Lithuania	45.91	x	x	45.91	
20	A	Stephanya Gómez	Peru	x	35.14	x	35.14	

=== Final ===
Rank	Name	Nationality	#1	#2	#3	#4	#5	#6	Result	Notes
1st place, gold medalist(s)	Kristin Pudenz	Germany	59.09	x	58.73	56.97	x	x	59.09	
2nd place, silver medalist(s)	Valarie Allman	United States	x	49.37	55.83	53.66	58.36	52.83	58.36	
3rd place, bronze medalist(s)	Taryn Gollshewsky	Australia	53.82	x	53.81	x	58.11	x	58.11	
4	Daria Zabawska	Poland	54.25	56.58	x	x	54.41	x	56.58	
5	Stefania Strumillo	Italy	50.39	55.37	56.16	x	x	x	56.16	
6	Kaur Kamalpreet	India	46.27	55.07	53.15	54.99	x	x	55.07	
7	Kätlin Tõllasson	Estonia	52.98	x	x	50.84	53.16	x	53.16	
8	Salla Sipponen	Finland	51.87	53.03	x	49.19	53.13	49.04	53.13	
9	Lidia Augustyniak	Poland	52.37	x	52.91				52.91	
10	Ischke Senekal	South Africa	52.87	x	49.60				52.87	
11	Li Wen-Hua	Chinese Taipei	49.85	51.73	x				51.73	
12	Agnes Esser	Canada	47.22	48.24	49.93				49.93	
