= Athletics at the 2019 Summer Universiade – Women's discus throw =

The women's discus throw event at the 2019 Summer Universiade was held on 9 July at the Stadio San Paolo in Naples.

== Medalists ==
Gold	Silver	Bronze
Daisy Osakue; Italy	Claudine Vita; Germany	Ieva Zarankaitė; Lithuania

== Results ==
=== Qualification ===
Qualification: 58.00 m (Q) or at least 12 best (q) qualified for the final.

Rank	Group	Name	Nationality	#1	#2	#3	Result	Notes
1	A	Claudine Vita	Germany	59.95			59.95	Q
2	A	Ailén Armada	Argentina	54.78	x	x	54.78	q, SB
3	A	Gabby Rains	Canada	54.76	x	44.22	54.76	q, SB
4	B	Subenrat Insaeng	Thailand	54.66	54.07	54.15	54.66	q
5	B	Daisy Osakue	Italy	51.48	x	54.05	54.05	q
6	B	Ieva Zarankaitė	Lithuania	52.61	50.61	53.92	53.92	q
7	A	Giada Andreutti	Italy	53.28	x	51.51	53.28	q
8	B	Portious Warren	Trinidad and Tobago	x	52.94	51.64	52.94	q
9	B	Lisa Pedersen Brix	Denmark	52.71	x	52.66	52.71	q
10	A	Veronika Domjan	Slovenia	49.77	52.53	51.59	52.53	q
11	B	Yolandi Stander	South Africa	52.13	51.73	x	52.13	q
12	B	Lidia Augustyniak	Poland	x	47.34	51.91	51.91	q
13	A	Daria Zabawska	Poland	x	x	51.51	51.51	
14	A	Salla Sipponen	Finland	51.23	49.28	x	51.23	
15	B	Jeong Ji-hye	South Korea	51.01	x	48.34	51.01	
16	B	Nanaka Kori	Japan	50.53	x	49.64	50.53	
17	A	Tatiana Kaumoana	New Zealand	48.29	x	50.16	50.16	
18	A	Maki Saito	Japan	47.65	50.08	x	50.08	
19	A	Amira Khaled	Egypt	46.13	x	49.22	49.22	
20	A	Lauren Bruce	New Zealand	33.35	47.68	x	47.68	
21	B	Chelsea Igberaese	United States	44.53	47.35	47.18	47.35	
22	B	Ophelie Oliveira	Portugal	46.60	46.58	47.13	47.13	SB
23	B	Vilma Paakkala	Finland	44.96	x	45.17	45.17	
24	B	Maia Ibel Varela	Argentina	43.84	x	44.88	44.88	
25	A	Tresna Puspita Gustiayu	Indonesia	44.55	42.66	43.45	44.55	
26	A	Cherisse Murray	Trinidad and Tobago	44.41	42.83	37.46	44.41	
27	B	Amanda Nordin	Sweden	x	41.14	40.48	41.14	
28	A	Alma Gutiérrez	Honduras	39.88	39.48	39.21	39.88	
29	B	Mercy Laker	Uganda	36.43	29.84	36.21	36.43	
	A	Gabriella Jacobs	United States	x	x	x	NM	

=== Final ===
Official Video

Rank	Name	Nationality	#1	#2	#3	#4	#5	#6	Result	Notes
1st place, gold medalist(s)	Daisy Osakue	Italy	55.27	x	x	56.50	61.69	x	61.69	PB
2nd place, silver medalist(s)	Claudine Vita	Germany	58.75	61.41	x	x	61.39	61.52	61.52	
3rd place, bronze medalist(s)	Ieva Zarankaitė	Lithuania	55.01	56.02	53.76	54.11	56.75	55.01	56.75	SB
4	Gabby Rains	Canada	53.93	55.74	x	x	53.03	x	55.74	SB
5	Subenrat Insaeng	Thailand	x	55.48	55.59	53.56	x	x	55.59	
6	Lidia Augustyniak	Poland	x	54.06	x	53.25	x	54.94	54.94	
7	Ailén Armada	Argentina	54.61	53.62	54.14	x	x	x	54.61	SB
8	Veronika Domjan	Slovenia	50.56	53.96	51.86	x	x	x	53.96	
9	Lisa Pedersen Brix	Denmark	53.71	x	x				53.71	
10	Yolandi Stander	South Africa	50.14	51.45	52.40				52.40	
11	Giada Andreutti	Italy	47.02	x	x				47.02	
	Portious Warren	Trinidad and Tobago	x	x	x				NM	
