= 2014 World Junior Championships in Athletics – Women's discus throw =

The women's discus throw event at the 2014 World Junior Championships in Athletics was held in Eugene, Oregon, USA, at Hayward Field on 24 and 25 July.

== Medalists ==
Gold	Izabela da Silva; Brazil
Silver	Valarie Allman; United States
Bronze	Navjeet Kaur Dhillon; India

== Results ==
=== Final ===
25 July
Start time: 19:47 Temperature: 27 °C Humidity: 37 %
End time: 20:49 Temperature: 25 °C Humidity: 41 %

Rank	Name	Nationality	Attempts						Result	Notes
Rank	Name	Nationality	1	2	3	4	5	6	Result	Notes
1st place, gold medalist(s)	Izabela da Silva	Brazil	53.93	58.03	57.39	57.12	x	55.73	58.03	WJL
2nd place, silver medalist(s)	Valarie Allman	United States	56.75	56.48	x	x	56.28	x	56.75	
3rd place, bronze medalist(s)	Navjeet Kaur Dhillon	India	54.08	56.36	54.61	52.83	x	x	56.36	PB
4	Liang Yan	China	51.49	55.70	x	55.21	55.72	56.27	56.27	
5	Claudine Vita	Germany	54.34	x	54.94	55.34	55.58	x	55.58	
6	Tetiana Yuryeva	Ukraine	50.79	x	53.11	x	54.35	52.19	54.35	
7	Filoi Aokuso	Australia	53.61	50.87	53.85	52.45	53.92	47.93	53.92	PB
8	June Kintana	Spain	52.91	53.34	x	53.36	x	x	53.36	
9	Karyna Cherednychenko	Ukraine	47.88	51.43	48.90				51.43	
10	Salla Sipponen	Finland	x	x	51.10				51.10	
11	Kristina Rakočević	Montenegro	45.87	47.20	49.44				49.44	
12	Agnes Esser	Canada	x	x	49.05				49.05	

=== Qualifications ===
24 July
With qualifying standard of 52.00 (Q) or at least the 12 best performers (q) advance to the Final

==== Summary ====
Rank	Name	Nationality	Result	Notes
1	Izabela da Silva	Brazil	55.96	Q NJR
2	Claudine Vita	Germany	53.46	Q
3	June Kintana	Spain	52.70	Q
4	Liang Yan	China	52.46	Q
5	Navjeet Kaur Dhillon	India	52.39	Q
6	Valarie Allman	United States	52.36	Q
7	Filoi Aokuso	Australia	52.33	Q PB
8	Salla Sipponen	Finland	52.08	Q
9	Agnes Esser	Canada	51.65	q PB
10	Karyna Cherednychenko	Ukraine	50.75	q
11	Tetiana Yuryeva	Ukraine	49.83	q
12	Kristina Rakočević	Montenegro	49.15	q
13	Nwanneka Okwelogu	Nigeria	49.07	
14	Shadae Lawrence	Jamaica	48.44	PB
15	Katelyn Daniels	United States	48.39	
16	Evi Weber	Germany	48.27	
17	Milica Vukadinović	Montenegro	48.01	
18	Veronika Domjan	Slovenia	47.07	
19	Kirsty Williams	Australia	46.79	
20	Xie Yuchen	China	46.74	
21	Mona Ekroll Jaidi	Norway	46.34	
22	Leandri Geel	South Africa	45.74	
23	Chiang Ru-Ching	Chinese Taipei	45.17	
24	Daria Zabawska	Poland	45.13	
25	Lenuta Burueana	Romania	45.03	
26	Maria Antonietta Basile	Italy	44.87	
27	Elefthería Terzáki	Greece	44.15	
28	Juliana Pereira	Portugal	43.97	
29	Réka Gyurátz	Hungary	42.70	
30	Rocío Aranda	Argentina	42.39	
	Shanice Love	Jamaica	NM	
	Zsófia Bácskay	Hungary	DNS	

==== Details ====
With qualifying standard of 52.00 (Q) or at least the 12 best performers (q) advance to the Final

===== Group A =====
25 July
Start time; 09:58 Temperature: 14 °C Humidity: 77 %
End time: 10:39 Temperature: 16 °C Humidity: 68 %

Rank	Name	Nationality	Attempts			Result	Notes
Rank	Name	Nationality	1	2	3	Result	Notes
1	Izabela da Silva	Brazil	51.63	55.96		55.96	Q NJR
2	Claudine Vita	Germany	51.41	x	53.46	53.46	Q
3	Liang Yan	China	52.46			52.46	Q
4	Filoi Aokuso	Australia	51.08	41.51	52.33	52.33	Q PB
5	Agnes Esser	Canada	51.65	51.36	51.10	51.65	q PB
6	Tetiana Yuryeva	Ukraine	x	49.83	x	49.83	q
7	Kristina Rakočević	Montenegro	47.09	49.15	x	49.15	q
8	Katelyn Daniels	United States	x	48.01	48.39	48.39	
9	Veronika Domjan	Slovenia	47.07	45.18	x	47.07	
10	Mona Ekroll Jaidi	Norway	x	46.34	45.40	46.34	
11	Daria Zabawska	Poland	x	45.13	x	45.13	
12	Maria Antonietta Basile	Italy	x	44.87	x	44.87	
13	Juliana Pereira	Portugal	41.35	43.97	x	43.97	
14	Réka Gyurátz	Hungary	41.06	42.70	42.08	42.70	
15	Rocío Aranda	Argentina	42.39	41.08	41.79	42.39	
	Shanice Love	Jamaica	x	x	x	NM	

===== Group B =====
25 July
Start time; 11:19 Temperature: 19 °C Humidity: 56 %
End time: 11:56 Temperature: 20 °C Humidity: 56 %

Rank	Name	Nationality	Attempts			Result	Notes
Rank	Name	Nationality	1	2	3	Result	Notes
1	June Kintana	Spain	52.70			52.70	Q
2	Navjeet Kaur Dhillon	India	52.39			52.39	Q
3	Valarie Allman	United States	52.36			52.36	Q
4	Salla Sipponen	Finland	48.72	52.08		52.08	Q
5	Karyna Cherednychenko	Ukraine	46.23	48.62	50.75	50.75	q
6	Nwanneka Okwelogu	Nigeria	49.07	x	49.06	49.07	
7	Shadae Lawrence	Jamaica	x	48.44	46.92	48.44	PB
8	Evi Weber	Germany	46.80	47.38	48.27	48.27	
9	Milica Vukadinović	Montenegro	x	46.67	48.01	48.01	
10	Kirsty Williams	Australia	46.79	x	x	46.79	
11	Xie Yuchen	China	7.02	x	46.74	46.74	
12	Leandri Geel	South Africa	42.56	43.99	45.74	45.74	
13	Chiang Ru-Ching	Chinese Taipei	43.74	x	45.17	45.17	
14	Lenuta Burueana	Romania	7.34	x	45.03	45.03	
15	Elefthería Terzáki	Greece	x	41.29	44.15	44.15	
	Zsófia Bácskay	Hungary				DNS	

== Participation ==
According to an unofficial count, 31 athletes from 24 countries participated in the event.

- Argentina (1)
- Australia (2)
- Brazil (1)
- Canada (1)
- China (2)
- Chinese Taipei (1)
- Finland (1)
- Germany (2)
- Greece (1)
- Hungary (1)
- India (1)
- Italy (1)
- Jamaica (2)
- Montenegro (2)
- Nigeria (1)
- Norway (1)
- Poland (1)
- Portugal (1)
- Romania (1)
- Slovenia (1)
- South Africa (1)
- Spain (1)
- Ukraine (2)
- United States (2)
