= 2017 European Athletics U23 Championships – Women's discus throw =

The women's discus throw event at the 2017 European Athletics U23 Championships was held in Bydgoszcz, Poland, at Zdzisław Krzyszkowiak Stadium on 13 and 14 July.

== Medalists ==
Gold	Claudine Vita; Germany
Silver	Daria Zabawska; Poland
Bronze	Veronika Domjan; Slovenia

== Results ==
=== Qualification ===
15 July

Qualification rule: 51.00 (Q) or the 12 best results (q) qualified for the final.

Rank	Group	Name	Nationality	#1	#2	#3	Results	Notes
1	B	Claudine Vita	Germany	59.87			59.87	Q
2	A	Daria Zabawska	Poland	50.45	x	59.23	59.23	Q, SB
3	A	Veronika Domjan	Slovenia	54.59			54.59	Q
4	A	Monika Nowak	Poland	49.13	54.27		54.27	Q, PB
5	B	Giada Andreutti	Italy	53.90			53.90	Q
6	A	June Kintana	Spain	50.40	53.44		53.44	Q
7	B	Karyna Cherednuchenko	Ukraine	53.09			53.09	Q, PB
8	B	Salla Sipponen	Finland	52.11			52.11	Q
9	B	Krista Uusi-Kinnala	Finland	x	51.92		51.92	Q, PB
10	A	Lisa Brix Perdersen	Denmark	51.55			51.55	Q
11	A	Amy Holder	Great Britain	51.37			51.37	Q
12	B	Aleksandra Grubba	Poland	42.21	48.27	50.91	50.91	q
13	A	Ivana Mužarić	Croatia	50.46	x	50.30	50.46	
14	B	Renata Petkova	Bulgaria	50.17	48.48	x	50.17	
15	B	Ophélie de Oliveira	Portugal	44.13	49.48	47.25	49.48	PB
16	A	Vilma Paakkala	Finland	48.93	46.83	x	48.93	
17	A	Mona Ekroll Jaidi	Norway	48.83	46.92	47.73	48.83	
18	A	Chantal Tanner	Switzerland	40.04	48.70	x	48.70	
19	B	Matilde Roe	Norway	48.50	45.97	46.67	48.50	
20	A	Juliana Pereira	Portugal	47.19	44.13	x	47.19	
21	B	Thelma Lind Kristjánsdóttir	Iceland	44.65	45.45	46.82	46.82	
22	B	Paula Ferrándiz	Spain	x	39.49	44.28	44.28	
	A	Daisy Osakue	Italy	x	x	x	NM	
	B	Djeneba Touré	Austria	x	x	x	NM	

=== Final ===
14 July

Rank	Name	Nationality	#1	#2	#3	#4	#5	#6	Result	Notes
1st place, gold medalist(s)	Claudine Vita	Germany	58.77	x	61.79	61.05	x	x	61.79	
2nd place, silver medalist(s)	Daria Zabawska	Poland	59.08	x	57.02	55.32	56.37	50.56	59.08	
3rd place, bronze medalist(s)	Veronika Domjan	Slovenia	56.82	56.48	x	58.48	56.26	56.41	58.48	SB
4	June Kintana	Spain	54.27	52.15	x	53.39	51.16	56.30	56.30	NU23R
5	Salla Sipponen	Finland	54.83	52.12	53.72	51.87	52.33	52.09	54.83	
6	Monika Nowak	Poland	54.21	54.08	52.88	x	x	53.65	54.21	
7	Krista Uusi-Kinnala	Finland	53.48	x	48.20	51.23	x	50.74	53.48	PB
8	Karyna Cherednuchenko	Ukraine	50.35	x	52.18	49.99	51.58	51.48	52.18	
9	Amy Holder	Great Britain	51.81	50.49	50.83				51.81	
10	Lisa Brix Perdersen	Denmark	51.46	x	x				51.46	
11	Giada Andreutti	Italy	48.17	48.34	49.04				49.04	
12	Aleksandra Grubba	Poland	x	47.26	46.32				47.26	
