= 2015 European Athletics U23 Championships – Women's discus throw =

The women's discus throw event at the 2015 European Athletics U23 Championships was held in Tallinn, Estonia, at Kadriorg Stadium on 11 and 12 July.

== Medalists ==
Gold	Shanice Craft; Germany
Silver	Anna Rüh; Germany
Bronze	Kristin Pudenz; Germany

== Results ==
=== Final ===
12 July

Rank	Name	Nationality	Attempts						Result	Notes
Rank	Name	Nationality	1	2	3	4	5	6	Result	Notes
1st place, gold medalist(s)	Shanice Craft	Germany	61.17	56.56	61.69	62.89	62.65	63.83	63.83	SB
2nd place, silver medalist(s)	Anna Rüh	Germany	59.04	61.27	60.57	59.63	60.15	x	61.27	
3rd place, bronze medalist(s)	Kristin Pudenz	Germany	54.72	56.21	x	x	59.85	59.94	59.94	
4	Daria Zabawska	Poland	58.38	59.06	x	56.80	x	x	59.06	
5	Natalya Shirobokova	Russia	54.31	52.28	52.89	x	x	57.55	57.55	
6	Lidia Augustyniak	Poland	51.69	54.75	x	49.87	50.42	53.64	54.75	
7	Karolina Makul	Poland	45.80	48.14	50.50	x	x	52.75	52.75	
8	Heini Järventausta	Finland	x	51.24	48.21	48.62	x	x	51.24	
9	Kätlin Tõllasson	Estonia	49.36	50.39	x				50.39	
10	Dimitriana Surdu	Moldova	44.37	47.23	49.96				49.96	
11	Dóra Kerekes	Hungary	49.87	x	x				49.87	
12	June Kintana	Spain	47.82	x	46.86				47.82	

=== Qualifications ===
11 July

Rank	Name	Nationality	Attempts			Result	Notes
Rank	Name	Nationality	1	2	3	Result	Notes
1	Daria Zabawska	Poland	60.23			60.23	PB Q
2	Anna Rüh	Germany	59.03			59.03	Q
3	Kristin Pudenz	Germany	58.28			58.28	Q
4	Shanice Craft	Germany	58.14			58.14	Q
5	Natalya Shirobokova	Russia	x	x	54.69	54.69	Q
6	Lidia Augustyniak	Poland	52.59	x	x	52.59	q
7	Heini Järventausta	Finland	49.21	48.30	51.71	51.71	PB q
8	Dimitriana Surdu	Moldova	48.40	48.97	51.18	51.18	q
9	June Kintana	Spain	x	50.93	48.52	50.93	q
10	Kätlin Tõllasson	Estonia	50.43	x	50.65	50.65	q
11	Dóra Kerekes	Hungary	41.18	47.19	50.63	50.63	q
12	Karolina Makul	Poland	49.33	50.53	50.15	50.53	q
13	Heidi Schmidt	Sweden	46.43	17.27	50.37	50.37	
14	Kateryna Nykyta	Ukraine	50.09	x	x	50.09	
15	Ieva Zarankaitė	Lithuania	x	49.84	x	49.84	
16	Krisztina Váradi	Hungary	48.40	49.41	49.38	49.41	
17	Salla Sipponen	Finland	45.52	47.97	49.38	49.38	
18	Zehra Uzunbilek	Turkey	48.39	46.06	49.22	49.22	
19	Giada Andreutti	Italy	48.00	47.16	46.25	48.00	
20	Maria Antonietta Basile	Italy	47.69	47.83	x	47.83	
21	Elçin Kaya	Turkey	x	46.67	x	46.67	
22	Emma Ljungberg	Sweden	45.53	x	x	45.53	
23	Júlia Kočarová	Slovakia	x	x	39.55	39.55	
	Stamatía Skarvéli	Greece	x	x	x	NM	

== Participation ==
According to an unofficial count, 23 athletes from 14 countries participated in the event.

- Estonia (1)
- Finland (2)
- Germany (3)
- Hungary (2)
- Italy (2)
- Lithuania (1)
- Moldova (1)
- Poland (3)
- Russia (1)
- Slovakia (1)
- Spain (1)
- Sweden (2)
- Turkey (2)
- Ukraine (1)
