= 2020 Slovenian Athletics Championships =

- Edition: 29th
- Dates: 25–26 July 2020
- Host city: Celje, Slovenia
- Level: Senior
- Type: Outdoor

The 2020 Slovenian Athletics Championships (Slovene: Prvenstvo Slovenije v Atletiki) was the 29th edition of the national championship in outdoor track and field for athletes in Slovenia. It was held between 25–26 July in Celje.

== Results ==
=== Men ===
Event	Gold		Silver		Bronze	
100 metres	Nick Kočevar	10.68 s	Tilen Ovniček	10.70 s	Matevž Šuštaršič	10.85 s
200 metres	Jure Grkman	21.15 s	Matevž Šuštaršič	21.61 s	Rok Ferlan	21.68 s
400 metres	Luka Janežič	46.53 s	Lovro Mesec Košir	46.83 s	Gregor Grahovac	47.21 s
800 metres	Jan Vukovič	1:49.55 min	Rok Merkelj	1:49.76 min	Lucijan Zalokar	1:52.93 min
1500 metres	Jan Kokalj	3:51.57 min	Vid Botolin	3:55.71 min	Matevž Cimermančič	3:57.44 min
3000 metres	Jan Kokalj	8:21.13 min	Vid Botolin	8:26.69 min	Jan Brešan	8:35.23 min
5000 metres	Jan Brešan	14:38.13 min	Mitja Krevs	14:49.31 min	Primož Kobe	14:58.53 min
110 m hurdles	Filip Jakob Demšar	14.34 s	Tilen Novak	15.35 s	Matej Stanič	16.04 s
400 m hurdles	Peter Hribarsek	53.77 s	Filip Jakob Demšar	54.62 s	Luka Končina	55.41 s
3000 m s'chase	Matevž Cimermančič	9:26.38 min	Klemen Vilhar	9:44.24 min	Matjaž Pregrat	9:48.36 min
4 × 100 m relay	AK Krkr Novo Mesto; Tilen Ovniček; Matevž Šuštaršič; Blaž Brulc; Ahac Moretti	40.90 s	AK Gorica Nova Gorica; Matej Stanić; Žiga Leban; Aljaž Murovec; Enej Leban	43.73 s		
4 × 400 m relay	AD Kladivar Celje; Lucijan Zalokar; Vid Kramer; Jan Vukovič; Luka Janežič	3:13.57 min	AD Mass Ljubljana 1 Žiga Kopač; Lovro Mesec Košir; Jernej Jeras; Žan Rudolf	3:14.72 min	AK Triglav Kranj; Jan Skalar; Domen Marš; Rok Markelj; Rok Ferlan	3:15.21 min
High jump	Sandro Jeršin Tomassini	2.12 m	Axel Luxa	2.01 m	Juš Smole	1.98 m
Pole vault	Robert Renner	5.25 m	Denis Babič	4.60 m	Tim Podergajs Siussi	3.60 m
Long jump	Dino Subašič	7.35 m w	Nino Celec	7.22 m	Žan Viher	7.05 m
Triple jump	Žiga Vrščaj	15.59 m	Jan Luxa	15.56 m	Blaž Pelko	15.30 m
Shot put	Blaž Zupančič	18.82 m	Tadej Hribar	16.72 m	Gašper Drev	12.98 m
Discus throw	Kristjan Čeh	62.37 m	Tadej Hribar	54.98 m	Robin William Vrbek	46.41 m
Hammer throw	Nejc Pleško	67.26 m	Jurček Korpič Lesjak	59.00 m	Jan Lokar	57.10 m
Javelin throw	Matija Kranjc	73.96 m	Filip Dominković	71.96 m	Klemen Bučar	60.50 m

=== Women ===
Event	Gold		Silver		Bronze	
100 metres	Maja Mihalinec	11.59 s	Iza Obal	12.17 s	Kaja Debevec	12.18 s
200 metres	Maja Mihalinec	23.41 s	Anita Horvat	23.66 s	Maja Pogorevc	24.62 s
400 metres	Anita Horvat	53.85 s	Maja Pogorevc	55.22 s	Lara Bezgovšek	57.44 s
800 metres	Jerneja Smonkar	2:09.22 min	Ingrid Železnik	2:14.09 min	Zala Sekavčnik	2:14.97 min
1500 metres	Ingrid Železnik	4:31.34 min	Veronika Sadek	4:36.31 min	Karin Gošek	4:37.10 min
3000 metres	Maruša Mišmaš-Zrimsek	8:46.44 min	Klara Lukan	9:05.95 min	Laura Guzelj Blatnik	9:48.49 min
5000 metres	Neja Kršinar	17:06.30 min	Laura Guzelj Blatnik	17:36.67 min	Klara Ljubi	18:08.51 min
100 m hurdles	Nika Glojnarič	13.51 s	Joni Tomičić Prezelj	13.83 s	Maja Bedrač	14.03 s
400 m hurdles	Agata Zupin	57.35 s	Aneja Simončič	57.85 s	Gala Trajkovič	61.29 s
4 × 100 m relay	AD Mass Ljubljana; Vika Rutar; Kaja Debevec; Zala Istenič; Maja Mihalinec	46.44 s	AD Kronos Ljubljana; Lara Jagodnik; Nika Ude; Tara Keber; Iza Obal	48.35 s	AK Slovenj Gradec; Zala Hovnik; Ivana Simonović; Lara Verhovnik; Vita Vovk	50.17 s
4 × 400 m relay	AK Velenje; Hana Marovt; Jerneja Smonkar; Alja Trupej; Anita Horvat	3:50.54 min	AD Mass Ljubljana; Ajda Lenardič; Kim Šimenc; Brina Mljač; Aneja Simončič	3:53.85 min	AD Kladivar Celje; Ana Šegota; Barbara Kok; Karin Gošek; Lara Bezgovšek	3:55.15 min
High jump	Lia Apostolovski	1.86 m	Monika Podlogar	1.77 m	Nina Likar	1.65 m
Pole vault	Tina Šutej	4.50 m	Ajda Osolnik	3.60 m	Nastja Modic	3.50 m
Long jump	Maja Bedrač	6.23 m	Eva Pepelnak	6.05 m	Urša Matotek	5.75 m w
Triple jump	Neja Filipič	13.88 m	Eva Pepelnak	13.65 m	Neja Omanović	12.27 m
Shot put	Veronika Domjan	14.69 m	Tjasa Križan	13.47 m	Tjaša Zajc	12.48 m
Discus throw	Veronika Domjan	52.53 m	Liza Lap	45.51 m	Hana Urankar	42.86 m
Hammer throw	Barbara Špiler	66.18 m	Claudia Štravs	60.84 m	Lina Čater	55.16 m
Javelin throw	Tina Vaupot	41.29 m	Leja Glojnarić	37.05 m	Nina Podgrajšek	36.72 m
