= Athletics at the 2015 Summer Universiade – Women's discus throw =

The women's discus throw event at the 2015 Summer Universiade was held on 8 and 9 July at the Gwangju Universiade Main Stadium.

== Medalists ==
Gold	Silver	Bronze
Yuliya Maltseva; Russia	Marike Steinacker; Germany	Stefania Strumillo; Italy

== Results ==
=== Qualification ===
Qualification: 55.00 m (Q) or at least 12 best (q) qualified for the final.

Rank	Group	Athlete	Nationality	#1	#2	#3	Result	Notes
1	A	Subenrat Insaeng	Thailand	53.32	49.02	56.77	56.77	Q
2	A	Marike Steinacker	Germany	55.45			55.45	Q
3	B	Yuliya Maltseva	Russia	55.02			55.02	Q
4	A	Tatyana Zhuravleva	Russia	40.39	52.16	54.67	54.67	q
5	B	Taryn Gollshewsky	Australia	51.98	x	54.47	54.47	q
6	B	Stefania Strumillo	Italy	54.45	x	54.25	54.45	q
7	A	Li Wen-Hua	Chinese Taipei	x	46.60	53.96	53.96	q
8	A	Valarie Allman	United States	44.11	53.14	x	53.14	q
9	B	Agnes Esser	Canada	x	52.25	x	52.25	q
10	A	Natalia Stratulat	Moldova	x	51.88	x	51.88	q
11	A	Androniki Lada	Cyprus	51.47	47.80	48.78	51.47	q
12	B	Ischke Senekal	South Africa	46.69	49.39	51.18	51.18	q, PB
13	B	Katri Hirvonen	Finland	49.71	x	50.96	50.96	
14	B	Kathrine Bebe	Denmark	50.80	x	50.53	50.80	
15	B	Jeong Ye-lim	South Korea	48.13	49.49	50.54	50.54	PB
16	A	Jitka Kubelová	Czech Republic	48.53	49.55	x	49.55	
17	B	TeRina Keenan	New Zealand	x	x	48.98	48.98	
18	A	Paulina Flores	Mexico	46.20	43.19	47.44	47.44	
19	B	Inga Miķelsone	Latvia	44.57	47.04	x	47.04	
20	A	Alix Kennedy	Australia	45.87	x	46.88	46.88	
21	B	Jessica Sharbono	United States	46.03	x	x	46.03	
	A	Navjeet Dhillon	India				DNS	

=== Final ===
Official Video

Rank	Athlete	Nationality	#1	#2	#3	#4	#5	#6	Result	Notes
1st place, gold medalist(s)	Yuliya Maltseva	Russia	56.54	59.37	x	x	57.12	58.18	59.37	
2nd place, silver medalist(s)	Marike Steinacker	Germany	58.13	53.41	55.94	x	55.73	58.83	58.83	
3rd place, bronze medalist(s)	Stefania Strumillo	Italy	x	54.90	53.54	56.06	58.22	x	58.22	PB
4	Subenrat Insaeng	Thailand	55.57	57.16	57.11	57.75	55.21	56.10	57.75	
5	Valarie Allman	United States	50.81	54.04	55.68	x	52.85	53.82	55.68	
6	Li Wen-Hua	Chinese Taipei	x	52.67	54.80	50.71	52.91	x	54.80	
7	Natalia Stratulat	Moldova	54.21	54.74	x	x	51.34	54.42	54.74	
8	Androniki Lada	Cyprus	48.76	54.19	52.54	52.50	53.37	54.11	54.19	
9	Taryn Gollshewsky	Australia	53.91	x	52.39				53.91	
10	Tatyana Zhuravleva	Russia	52.63	x	53.90				53.90	
11	Agnes Esser	Canada	52.44	x	51.57				52.44	
12	Ischke Senekal	South Africa	50.44	50.49	50.53				50.53	
