= Natalia Stratulat =

Moldovan discus thrower

Personal information
- Born: 24 July 1987 (age 38)
- Education: State Institute of Physical Education and Sport
- Height: 1.78 m (5 ft 10 in)
- Weight: 83 kg (183 lb)

Sport
- Sport: Athletics
- Event: Discus throw

Natalia Stratulat (born 24 July 1987) is a Moldovan athlete specialising in the discus throw. She represented her country at the 2016 Summer Olympics without qualifying for the final.

Her personal best in the event is 62.13 metres set is Vila Réal de Santo António in 2012.

== International competitions ==
Year	Competition	Venue	Position	Notes
Representing Moldova
2015	Universiade	Gwangju, South Korea	7th	54.74 m
2016	Championships of the Small States of Europe	Marsa, Malta	1st	56.01 m
2016	European Championships	Amsterdam, Netherlands	20th (q)	54.45 m
2016	Olympic Games	Rio de Janeiro, Brazil	30th (q)	53.27 m
