= Shanice Craft =

German athlete (born 1993)

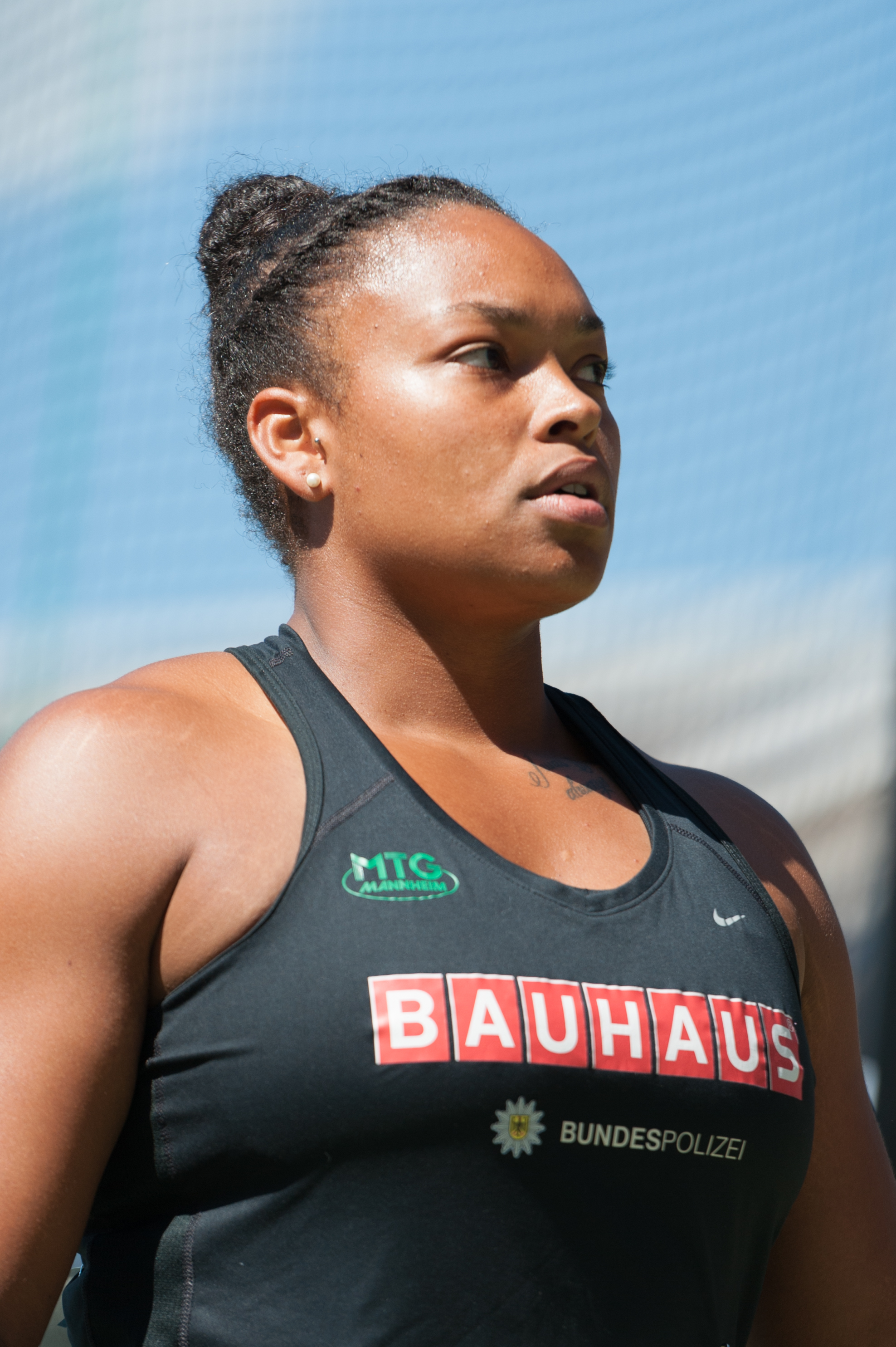
- Shanice Craft in 2015.

Personal information
- Born: 15 May 1993 (age 33)
- Height: 1.85 m (6 ft 1 in)

Sport
- Country: Germany
- Sport: Athletics
- Events: Discus, Shot put
Medal record
European Championships
Silver medal – second place	2026 Birmingham	Discus throw
Bronze medal – third place	2014 Zürich	Discus throw
Bronze medal – third place	2016 Amsterdam	Discus throw
Bronze medal – third place	2018 Berlin	Discus throw

Shanice Craft (born 15 May 1993 in Mannheim) is a German athlete who competes in the discus throw and shot put. She won three consecutive bronze medals in the discus throw at the 2014, 2016 and 2018 European Championships. In addition, she won multiple medals in various junior categories.

== Career ==
She won the gold medal in the discus throw at the 2012 World Junior Championships in Athletics in Barcelona, Spain. She won a bronze medal at the 2014 European Athletics Championships in Zurich, Switzerland with a throw of 64.33 metres. She finished seventh in the final of the discus throw at the 2015 World Athletics Championships in Beijing.

She won a bronze medal at the 2016 European Athletics Championships in Amsterdam, Netherlands with a throw of 63.89 metres. She competed for Germany at the 2016 Olympic Games in Rio de Janeiro, Brazil. She won a bronze medal at the 2018 European Athletics Championships in Berlin, with a throw of 62.89 metres.

She competed at the 2022 World Athletics Championships in Eugene, Oregon, where she successfully reached the final and placed ninth overall, throwing a best of 62.35 metres. She competed at the 2022 European Athletics Championships in Munich, Germany, where she qualified for the final and placed seventh overall with a best throw of 62.78 metres.

She competed at the 2023 World Athletics Championships in Budapest, Hungary, placing seventh in the final with a best throw of 65.47 metres.

She competed at the 2024 European Athletics Championships in Rome, Italy, placing sixth in the final.

== Personal life ==
Her father is an African-American former U.S. Army soldier and her mother is European-German.

== Competition record ==
Year	Competition	Venue	Position	Event	Notes
Representing Germany
2009	World Youth Championships	Brixen, Italy	3rd	Discus throw	49.15 m
2010	Youth Olympic Games	Singapore	1st	Discus throw	55.49 m
2011	European Junior Championships	Tallinn, Estonia	1st	Discus throw	58.65 m
2012	World Junior Championships	Barcelona, Spain	1st	Shot put	17.15 m
2012	World Junior Championships	Barcelona, Spain	2nd	Discus throw	60.42 m
2013	European Indoor Championships	Gothenburg, Sweden	11th (q)	Shot put	17.30 m
2013	European Cup Winter Throwing (U23)	Castellón, Spain	1st	Discus throw	60.14 m
2013	European U23 Championships	Tampere, Finland	2nd	Shot put	17.29 m
2013	European U23 Championships	Tampere, Finland	2nd	Discus throw	58.64 m
2014	European Cup Winter Throwing (U23)	Leiria, Portugal	1st	Discus throw	64.16 m
2014	European Championships	Zürich, Switzerland	3rd	Discus throw	64.33 m
2015	European U23 Championships	Tallinn, Estonia	2nd	Shot put	17.29 m
2015	European U23 Championships	Tallinn, Estonia	1st	Discus throw	63.83 m
2015	World Championships	Beijing, China	7th	Discus throw	63.10 m
2016	European Championships	Amsterdam, Netherlands	3rd	Discus throw	63.89 m
2016	Olympic Games	Rio de Janeiro, Brazil	11th	Discus throw	59.85 m
2018	European Championships	Berlin, Germany	3rd	Discus throw	62.46 m
2022	World Championships	Eugene, United States	9th	Discus throw	62.35 m
2022	European Championships	Munich, Germany	7th	Discus throw	62.78 m
2023	European Throwing Cup	Leiria, Portugal	1st	Discus throw	64.88 m
2023	World Championships	Budapest, Hungary	7th	Discus throw	65.47 m
2024	European Championships	Rome, Italy	6th	Discus throw	61.73 m
2025	World Championships	Tokyo, Japan	8th	Discus throw	65.21 m
2026	European Championships	Birmingham, United Kingdom	2nd	Discus throw	65.72 m

== Personal bests ==
Outdoor

- Shot put – 17.75 (Ulm 2014)
- Discus throw – 66.73 (Neubrandenburg 2023)

Indoor

- Shot put – 17.66 (Dortmund 2013)
