= 2010 World Junior Championships in Athletics – Women's discus throw =

The women's discus throw event at the 2010 World Junior Championships in Athletics was held in Moncton, New Brunswick, Canada, at Moncton Stadium on 20 and 22 July.

== Medalists ==
| Gold | Yaime Pérez; Cuba |
| Silver | Erin Pendleton; United States |
| Bronze | Yuliya Kurylo; Ukraine |

== Results ==
=== Final ===
22 July

| Rank | Name | Nationality | Attempts | | | | | | Result | Notes |
| Rank | Name | Nationality | 1 | 2 | 3 | 4 | 5 | 6 | Result | Notes |
|---|---|---|---|---|---|---|---|---|---|---|
| 1st place, gold medalist(s) | Yaime Pérez | Cuba | 48.05 | x | 56.01 | 49.04 | 52.23 | 50.77 | 56.01 | |
| 2nd place, silver medalist(s) | Erin Pendleton | United States | 53.57 | 53.22 | x | 53.63 | 54.15 | 54.96 | 54.96 | |
| 3rd place, bronze medalist(s) | Yuliya Kurylo | Ukraine | 48.31 | x | 52.19 | 53.96 | 52.02 | 53.75 | 53.96 | |
| 4 | Kimberley Mulhall | Australia | 50.99 | 53.16 | 52.19 | 52.74 | 52.55 | 53.77 | 53.77 | |
| 5 | Irina Rodrigues | Portugal | 51.62 | 52.75 | x | x | 49.38 | 52.03 | 52.75 | |
| 6 | Anaïs Marcadet | France | 48.85 | 50.25 | x | 51.23 | 49.77 | 52.65 | 52.65 | |
| 7 | Margaret Satupai | Samoa | 51.31 | 49.74 | x | 41.33 | 51.17 | 48.26 | 51.31 | |
| 8 | Lucie Catouillart | France | 45.83 | 50.13 | 47.02 | 47.96 | x | x | 50.13 | |
| 9 | Weng Chunxia | China | 49.46 | 48.79 | x | | | | 49.46 | |
| 10 | Jitka Kubelová | Czech Republic | 47.88 | x | 43.50 | | | | 47.88 | |
| 11 | Antje Bormann | Germany | 45.52 | 44.76 | x | | | | 45.52 | |
| | Siositina Hakeai | New Zealand | x | x | x | | | | NM | |

=== Qualifications ===
20 July

==== Group A ====
| Rank | Name | Nationality | Attempts | | | Result | Notes |
| Rank | Name | Nationality | 1 | 2 | 3 | Result | Notes |
|---|---|---|---|---|---|---|---|
| 1 | Yaime Pérez | Cuba | 53.91 | - | - | 53.91 | Q |
| 2 | Anaïs Marcadet | France | 38.41 | 47.60 | 52.75 | 52.75 | q |
| 3 | Kimberley Mulhall | Australia | x | 50.58 | 52.61 | 52.61 | q |
| 4 | Margaret Satupai | Samoa | x | 50.15 | 50.36 | 50.36 | q |
| 5 | Antje Bormann | Germany | 49.98 | x | 48.74 | 49.98 | q |
| 6 | Siositina Hakeai | New Zealand | 49.37 | 49.09 | 47.39 | 49.37 | q |
| 7 | Su Xinyue | China | 48.99 | 47.71 | 48.11 | 48.99 | |
| 8 | Alyssa Hasslen | United States | 48.91 | x | 46.53 | 48.91 | |
| 9 | Hristína Anagnostopoúlou | Greece | 47.54 | 47.66 | x | 47.66 | |
| 10 | Olga Abramchuk | Ukraine | 46.71 | x | x | 46.71 | |
| 11 | Corinne Nugter | Netherlands | 46.29 | 44.38 | 45.94 | 46.29 | |
| 12 | Miya Itoman | Japan | 38.94 | x | 43.85 | 43.85 | |
| 13 | Androniki Lada | Cyprus | x | 41.98 | x | 41.98 | |

==== Group B ====
| Rank | Name | Nationality | Attempts | | | Result | Notes |
| Rank | Name | Nationality | 1 | 2 | 3 | Result | Notes |
|---|---|---|---|---|---|---|---|
| 1 | Irina Rodrigues | Portugal | 51.83 | 51.52 | 51.26 | 51.83 | q |
| 2 | Erin Pendleton | United States | 48.93 | 51.74 | 48.92 | 51.74 | q |
| 3 | Yuliya Kurylo | Ukraine | x | 51.19 | x | 51.19 | q |
| 4 | Weng Chunxia | China | x | x | 50.14 | 50.14 | q |
| 5 | Jitka Kubelová | Czech Republic | 49.98 | x | x | 49.98 | q |
| 6 | Lucie Catouillart | France | x | 49.60 | x | 49.60 | q |
| 7 | Leesa Lealaisalanoa | New Zealand | 42.36 | 48.36 | 48.55 | 48.55 | |
| 8 | Ashlee Smith | Trinidad and Tobago | 47.68 | 45.49 | 46.31 | 47.68 | |
| 9 | Lidiane Cansian | Brazil | x | x | 46.56 | 46.56 | |
| 10 | Candicea Bernard | Jamaica | x | 46.47 | 46.26 | 46.47 | |
| 11 | Anna Rüh | Germany | 45.13 | x | 46.32 | 46.32 | |
| 12 | Ilaria Marchetti | Italy | 43.11 | 44.51 | 45.68 | 45.68 | |
| 13 | Breanna Rak | Canada | 44.87 | x | x | 44.87 | |
| 14 | Taryn Gollshewsky | Australia | x | 43.97 | x | 43.97 | |

== Participation ==
According to an unofficial count, 27 athletes from 20 countries participated in the event.

- Australia (2)
- Brazil (1)
- Canada (1)
- China (2)
- Cuba (1)
- Cyprus (1)
- Czech Republic (1)
- France (2)
- Germany (2)
- Greece (1)
- Italy (1)
- Jamaica (1)
- Japan (1)
- Netherlands (1)
- New Zealand (2)
- Portugal (1)
- Samoa (1)
- Trinidad and Tobago (1)
- Ukraine (2)
- United States (2)
