= Corinne Nugter =

Dutch discus thrower

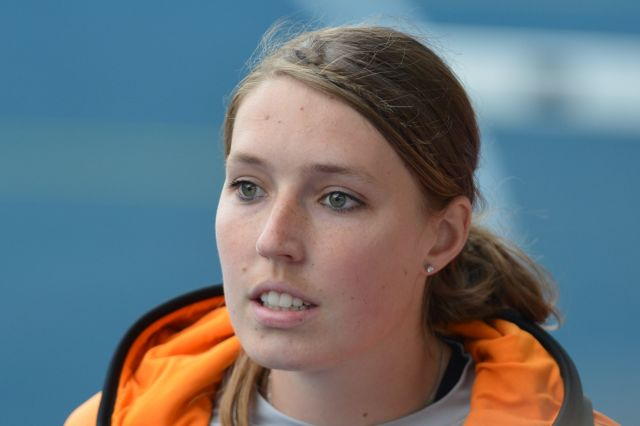
- Corinne Nugter in 2014

Personal information
- Born: 28 March 1992 (age 34) Emmeloord, Netherlands

Sport
- Sport: Athletics
- Event: Discus throw

Corinne Nugter (born 28 March 1992, in Emmeloord) is a Dutch athlete specialising in the discus throw. She won two medals at the 2009 European Youth Summer Olympic Festival.

Her personal best in the event is 60.02 metres set in Heerhugowaard in 2018.

== International competitions ==
Year	Competition	Venue	Position	Event	Notes
Representing the Netherlands
2009	European Youth Olympic Festival	Tampere, Finland	1st	Shot put	14.58 m
2009	European Youth Olympic Festival	Tampere, Finland	2nd	Discus throw	45.54 m
2010	World Junior Championships	Moncton, Canada	12th (q)	Shot put	14.37 m
2010	World Junior Championships	Moncton, Canada	22nd (q)	Discus throw	46.29 m
2011	European Junior Championships	Tallinn, Estonia	6th	Shot put	15.37 m
2011	European Junior Championships	Tallinn, Estonia	6th	Discus throw	49.51 m
2013	European U23 Championships	Tampere, Finland	16th (q)	Shot put	15.01 m
2013	European U23 Championships	Tampere, Finland	11th	Discus throw	49.26 m
2016	European Championships	Amsterdam, Netherlands	18th (q)	Discus throw	55.52 m
2018	European Championships	Berlin, Germany	14th (q)	Discus throw	55.70 m
