= Salla Sipponen =

Finnish discus thrower

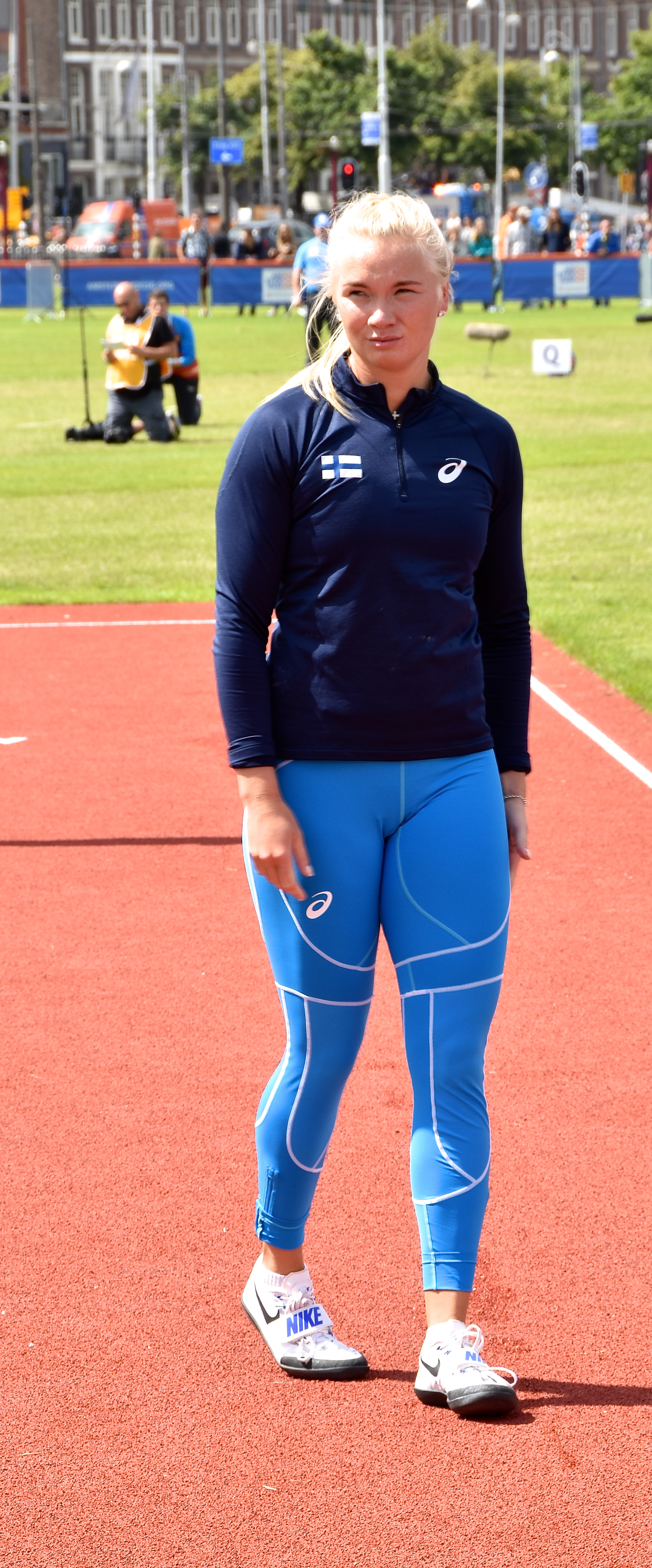
- Salla Sipponen in 2016

Personal information
- Full name: Salla Maaria Sipponen
- Born: 13 March 1995 (age 31) Keuruu, Finland
- Education: Savonia University of Applied Sciences
- Height: 1.80 m (5 ft 11 in)
- Weight: 73 kg (161 lb)

Sport
- Sport: Athletics
- Event: Discus throw
- Club: Keuruun Kisailijat
- Coached by: Jukka Vilkkilä

Salla Maaria Sipponen (born 13 March 1995 in Keuruu) is a Finnish athlete specialising in the discus throw. She finished fifth at the 2017 European U23 Championships. In addition she represented her country at two senior European Championships without qualifying for the final.

Her personal best in the event is 58.36 metres set in Lapinlahti in 2018.

== International competitions ==
Year	Competition	Venue	Position	Event	Notes
Representing Finland
2013	European Junior Championships	Rieti, Italy	13th (q)	Discus throw	46.40 m
2014	World Junior Championships	Eugene, United States	10th	Discus throw	51.10 m
2015	European U23 Championships	Tallinn, Estonia	17th (q)	Discus throw	49.38 m
2016	European Throwing Cup (U23)	Arad, Romania	2nd	Discus throw	53.15 m
2016	European Championships	Amsterdam, Netherlands	19th (q)	Discus throw	54.95 m
2017	European U23 Championships	Bydgoszcz, Poland	5th	Discus throw	54.83 m
2017	Universiade	Taipei, Taiwan	8th	Discus throw	53.13 m
2018	European Championships	Berlin, Germany	21st (q)	Discus throw	54.00 m
2019	Universiade	Naples, Italy	14th (q)	Discus throw	51.23 m
2022	World Championships	Eugene, United States	26th (q)	Discus throw	57.16 m
2022	European Championships	Munich, Germany	17th (q)	Discus throw	56.47 m
2023	World Championships	Budapest, Hungary	31st (q)	Discus throw	54.72 m
2024	European Championships	Rome, Italy	25th (q)	Discus throw	54.92 m
