= 2013 European Athletics U23 Championships – Women's discus throw =

The Women's discus throw event at the 2013 European Athletics U23 Championships was held in Tampere, Finland, at Ratina Stadium on 13 and 14 July 2013.

== Medalists ==
Gold	Anna Rüh; Germany
Silver	Shanice Craft; Germany
Bronze	Irina Rodrigues; Portugal

== Results ==
=== Final ===
14 July 2013

Rank	Name	Nationality	Attempts						Result	Notes
Rank	Name	Nationality	1	2	3	4	5	6	Result	Notes
1st place, gold medalist(s)	Anna Rüh	Germany	x	59.94	61.45	x	61.45	58.62	61.45	
2nd place, silver medalist(s)	Shanice Craft	Germany	x	58.64	58.00	55.93	x	x	58.64	
3rd place, bronze medalist(s)	Irina Rodrigues	Portugal	51.96	52.71	x	51.57	56.80	52.20	56.80	
4	Kristin Pudenz	Germany	x	43.62	55.31	51.90	x	52.14	55.31	
5	Hrisoúla Anagnostopoúlou	Greece	53.45	49.17	49.32	52.93	55.05	54.73	55.05	
6	Andżelika Przybylska	Poland	x	50.35	52.06	53.86	52.41	52.18	53.86	
7	Jitka Kubelová	Czech Republic	51.16	52.12	x	53.58	x	x	53.58	
8	Androniki Lada	Cyprus	50.72	52.10	52.57	50.60	51.77	x	52.57	
9	Heidi Schmidt	Sweden	x	51.08	51.81				51.81	
10	Ilaria Marchetti	Italy	49.87	48.49	49.29				49.87	
11	Corinne Nugter	Netherlands	48.62	x	49.26				49.26	
12	Krisztina Váradi	Hungary	x	48.42	46.77				48.42	

=== Qualifications ===
Qualified: qualifying perf. 54.00 (Q) or 12 best performers (q) advance to the Final

==== Summary ====
Rank	Name	Nationality	Result	Notes
1	Anna Rüh	Germany	60.79	Q
2	Shanice Craft	Germany	57.38	Q
3	Hrisoúla Anagnostopoúlou	Greece	54.74	Q
4	Jitka Kubelová	Czech Republic	54.70	Q
5	Irina Rodrigues	Portugal	54.58	Q
6	Kristin Pudenz	Germany	53.77	q
7	Heidi Schmidt	Sweden	53.16	q
8	Andżelika Przybylska	Poland	53.07	q
9	Ilaria Marchetti	Italy	52.38	q
10	Krisztina Váradi	Hungary	52.25	q PB
11	Corinne Nugter	Netherlands	51.60	q
12	Androniki Lada	Cyprus	51.53	q
13	Julia Viberg	Sweden	50.52	
14	Claire Fitzgerald	Ireland	49.93	
15	Yuliya Kurylo	Ukraine	49.62	
16	Haja Gerewu	Spain	48.91	SB
17	Viktoriya Klochko	Ukraine	48.68	
18	Kätlin Tõllasson	Estonia	46.96	
19	Solveig Fredriksen	Norway	46.48	
20	Inga Miķelsone	Latvia	45.36	
21	Lucie Catouillart	France	45.09	
22	Natalina Capoferri	Italy	43.61	
	Annastasia Muchkaev	Israel	DNS	

==== Details ====
===== Group A =====
13 July 2013 / 12:30

Rank	Name	Nationality	Attempts			Result	Notes
Rank	Name	Nationality	1	2	3	Result	Notes
1	Shanice Craft	Germany	57.38			57.38	Q
2	Irina Rodrigues	Portugal	54.58			54.58	Q
3	Andżelika Przybylska	Poland	51.96	53.07	52.04	53.07	q
4	Krisztina Váradi	Hungary	48.05	50.12	52.25	52.25	q PB
5	Androniki Lada	Cyprus	50.77	49.10	51.53	51.53	q
6	Julia Viberg	Sweden	50.42	x	50.52	50.52	
7	Claire Fitzgerald	Ireland	49.93	x	46.89	49.93	
8	Yuliya Kurylo	Ukraine	x	49.62	49.24	49.62	
9	Solveig Fredriksen	Norway	46.48	45.93	x	46.48	
10	Inga Miķelsone	Latvia	45.36	x	45.29	45.36	
11	Lucie Catouillart	France	7.66	7.30	45.09	45.09	
12	Natalina Capoferri	Italy	43.61	x	x	43.61	

===== Group B =====
13 July 2013 / 13:40

Rank	Name	Nationality	Attempts			Result	Notes
Rank	Name	Nationality	1	2	3	Result	Notes
1	Anna Rüh	Germany	60.79			60.79	Q
2	Hrisoúla Anagnostopoúlou	Greece	54.74			54.74	Q
3	Jitka Kubelová	Czech Republic	52.16	52.80	54.70	54.70	Q
4	Kristin Pudenz	Germany	x	53.77	x	53.77	q
5	Heidi Schmidt	Sweden	48.51	x	53.16	53.16	q
6	Ilaria Marchetti	Italy	52.38	x	50.68	52.38	q
7	Corinne Nugter	Netherlands	47.87	51.60	49.92	51.60	q
8	Haja Gerewu	Spain	x	45.98	48.91	48.91	SB
9	Viktoriya Klochko	Ukraine	x	48.37	48.68	48.68	
10	Kätlin Tõllasson	Estonia	46.96	45.46	x	46.96	
	Annastasia Muchkaev	Israel				DNS	

== Participation ==
According to an unofficial count, 22 athletes from 17 countries participated in the event.

- Cyprus (1)
- Czech Republic (1)
- Estonia (1)
- France (1)
- Germany (3)
- Greece (1)
- Hungary (1)
- Ireland (1)
- Italy (2)
- Latvia (1)
- Netherlands (1)
- Norway (1)
- Poland (1)
- Portugal (1)
- Spain (1)
- Sweden (2)
- Ukraine (2)
