= Siositina Hakeai =

New Zealand athletics competitor

Personal information
- Born: 1 March 1994 (age 32) Ōtāhuhu, New Zealand
- Height: 1.82 m (6.0 ft) (2014)
- Weight: 132 kg (291 lb) (2014)

Sport
- Country: New Zealand
Medal record
Athletics
Representing New Zealand
Oceania Championships
Gold medal – first place	2015 Cairns	Discus
- Updated on 22 May 2015

Siositina Hakeai (born 1 March 1994) is a New Zealand athlete. She was New Zealand women's discus champion for three years from 2012 to 2014. Hakeai placed fourth in the women's discus throw at both the 2014 Commonwealth Games and the 2018 Commonwealth Games.

== Personal bests ==
Event	Result	Venue	Date
Shot put	14.58 m	(New Zealand) Lower Hutt	30 Mar 2012
Discus throw	59.81 m	(United States) Chula Vista, California	23 Apr 2015
Hammer throw	36.38 m	(New Zealand) Christchurch	22 Feb 2014

== Competition record ==
Year	Competition	Venue	Position	Event	Notes
Representing New Zealand
2010	Oceania Youth Championships	Sydney, Australia	2nd	Shot Put	13.43m
2010	Oceania Youth Championships	Sydney, Australia	3rd	Discus	47.61m
2010	World Junior Championships	Moncton, New Brunswick, Canada	—	Discus	NM
2011	Oceania Youth Championships	Sydney, Australia	3rd	Shot Put	13.59m
2011	Oceania Youth Championships	Sydney, Australia	11th	Discus	32.40m
2011	World Youth Championships	Villeneuve d'Ascq, France	7th	Shot Put	13.73m
2011	World Youth Championships	Villeneuve d'Ascq, France	15th (q)	Discus	45.76m
2012	World Junior Championships	Barcelona, Spain	4th	Discus	56.17m
2014	Commonwealth Games	Glasgow, United Kingdom	4th	Discus	58.67m
2015	Oceania Championships	Cairns, Queensland, Australia	1st	Discus	56.06m
2015	World Championships	Beijing, China	30th (q)	Discus	54.89 m
2018	Commonwealth Games	Gold Coast, Australia	4th	Discus	57.16 m
