= Athletics at the 2022 Commonwealth Games – Women's discus throw =

Women's discus throw at the 2022 Commonwealth Games
- Venue: Alexander Stadium
- Dates: 2 August
- Competitors: 11 from 9 nations
- Winning distance: 61.70 m

Medalists
gold medal	Chioma Onyekwere	Nigeria
silver medal	Jade Lally	England
bronze medal	Obiageri Amaechi	Nigeria

The women's discus throw at the 2022 Commonwealth Games, as part of the athletics programme, took place in the Alexander Stadium on 2 August 2022.

== Records ==
Prior to this competition, the existing world and Games records were as follows:

World record	Gabriele Reinsch (GDR)	76.80 m	Neubrandenburg, East Germany	9 July 1988
Commonwealth record	Dani Stevens (AUS)	69.64 m	London, United Kingdom	13 August 2017
Games record	Dani Stevens (AUS)	68.26 m	Gold Coast, Australia	12 April 2018

== Schedule ==
The schedule was as follows:

Date	Time	Round
Tuesday 2 August 2022	20:22	Final

All times are British Summer Time (UTC+1)

== Results ==
=== Final ===
The medals were determined in the final.

Rank	Name	#1	#2	#3	#4	#5	#6	Result	Notes
1st place, gold medalist(s)	Chioma Onyekwere (NGR)	55.82	56.42	x	61.70	x	59.98	61.70	SB
2nd place, silver medalist(s)	Jade Lally (ENG)	57.33	x	54.76	x	x	58.42	58.42	
3rd place, bronze medalist(s)	Obiageri Amaechi (NGR)	x	52.75	53.22	53.36	56.99	54.96	56.99	
4	Taryn Gollshewsky (AUS)	53.23	53.60	52.17	56.85	55.19	55.97	56.85	
5	Seema Punia (IND)	52.28	55.92	52.30	x	x	53.81	55.92	
6	Yolandi Stander (RSA)	55.49	53.99	52.51	53.11	52.01	55.16	55.49	
7	Kirsty Law (SCO)	53.38	52.83	52.09	54.38	x	53.35	54.38	
8	Navjeet Dhillon (IND)	50.95	53.14	x	52.21	52.46	53.51	53.51	
9	Androniki Lada (CYP)	48.28	52.39	53.04	—			53.04	
10	Shadine Duquemin (JEY)	x	52.87	51.68	—			52.87	
11	Tiara Derosa (BER)	x	42.86	45.79	—			45.79	
