= Claudine Vita =

German athletics competitor

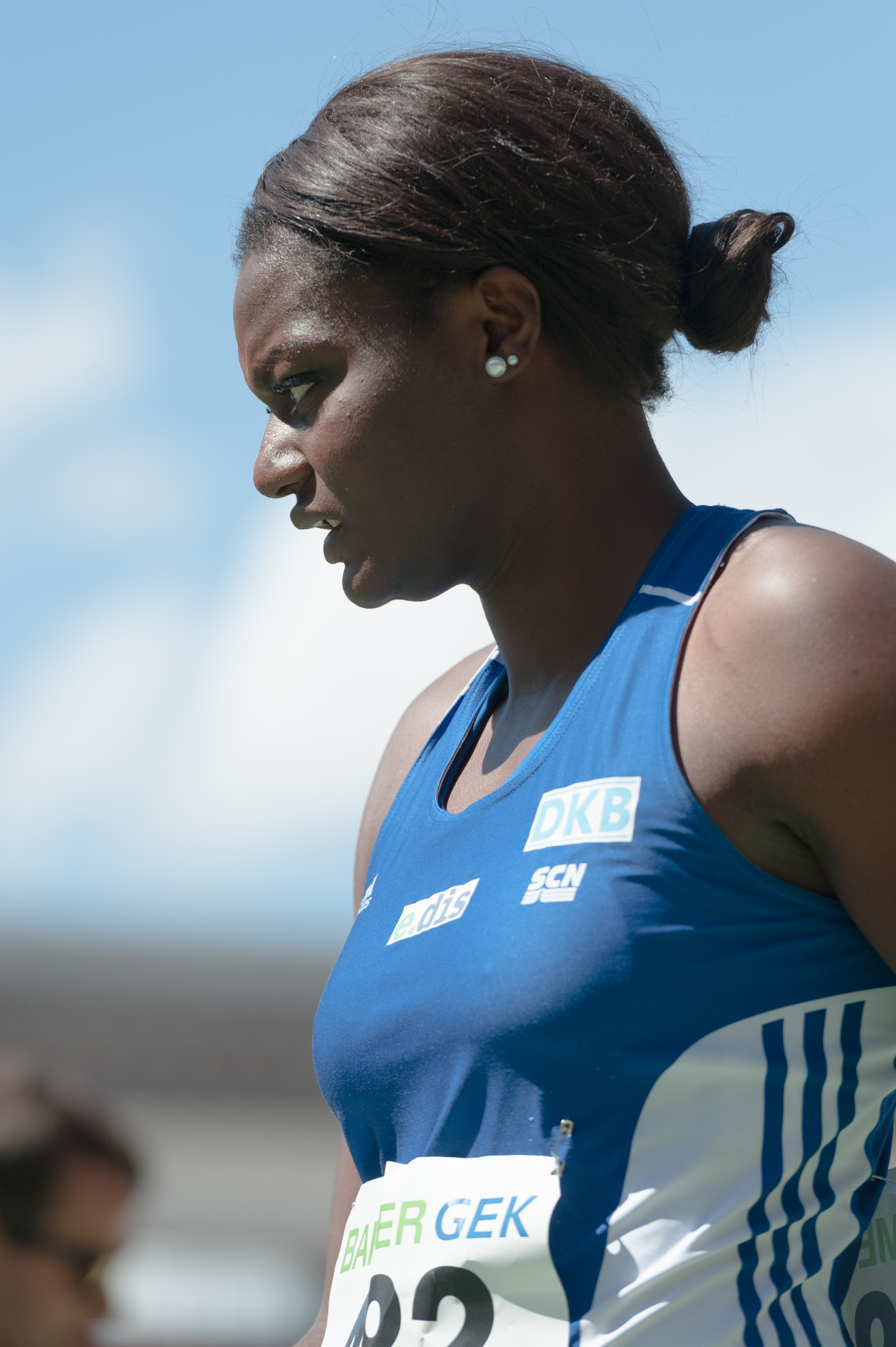
- Vita in 2015

Personal information
- Born: 19 September 1996 (age 29) Frankfurt (Oder), Germany
- Height: 1.79 m (5 ft 10 in)
- Weight: 89 kg (196 lb)

Sport
- Sport: Athletics
- Events: Discus throw, shot put
- Club: SC Neubrandenburg
- Coached by: Dieter Kollark; Franka Dietzsch
Medal record
Women's athletics
Representing Germany
European Championships
Bronze medal – third place	2022 Munich	Discus throw

Claudine Vita (born 19 September 1996 in Frankfurt an der Oder) is a German athlete competing in the discus throw and shot put. She competed at the 2020 and 2024 Olympic Games, as well as multiple other major championships. She was a bronze medalist at the 2022 European Athletics Championships, and a gold medalist at the 2017 European U23 Championships and 2015 European Junior Championships.

== Career ==
She won a silver medal at the 2013 IAAF World Youth Championships in Donetsk, Ukraine. She won a gold medal in the discus throw at the 2015 European Junior Championships in Eskilstuna, Sweden. She won a gold medal in the discus throw at the 2017 European U23 Championships in Bydgoszcz, Poland. She was a silver medalist at the 2019 Summer Universiade in Naples. She won gold competing for Germany at the 2019 European Athletics Team Championships in Poland.

She competed at the delayed 2020 Olympic Games in Tokyo, Japan held in 2021, where she qualified for the final and placed ninth overall.

She competed at the 2022 World Athletics Championships in Eugene, Oregon, where she successfully reached the final and placed fifth overall with a best throw of 65.24 metres.

She competed at the 2022 European Athletics Championships in Munich, Germany, where she qualified for the final and placed third overall with a best throw of 65.20 metres to win the bronze medal.

She competed at the 2023 World Athletics Championships in Budapest, Hungary, placing tenth in the final with a throw of 63.19 metres, having thrown 64.51 metres in the qualifying round.

She placed fifth in the final at the 2024 European Athletics Championships in Rome, Italy. She competed at the 2024 Olympic Games in Paris, France, where she placed sixth in the final with a best throw of 63.62 metres.

== Personal life ==
Vita was born in Germany to Angolan parents.

== International competitions ==
Year	Competition	Venue	Position	Event	Notes
Representing Germany
2013	World Youth Championships	Donetsk, Ukraine	2nd	Discus throw	52.59 m
2014	World Junior Championships	Eugene, United States	5th	Discus throw	55.58 m
2015	European Junior Championships	Eskilstuna, Sweden	2nd	Shot put	17.13 m
2015	European Junior Championships	Eskilstuna, Sweden	1st	Discus throw	57.47 m
2017	European Indoor Championships	Belgrade, Serbia	5th	Shot put	18.09 m
2017	European Throwing Cup (U23)	Las Palmas, Spain	1st	Discus throw	58.76 m
2017	European U23 Championships	Bydgoszcz, Poland	5th	Shot put	17.33 m
2017	European U23 Championships	Bydgoszcz, Poland	1st	Discus throw	61.79 m
2018	European Championships	Berlin, Germany	4th	Discus throw	61.25 m
2019	Universiade	Naples, Italy	2nd	Discus throw	61.52 m
2019	World Championships	Doha, Qatar	9th	Discus throw	60.77 m
2021	Olympic Games	Tokyo, Japan	9th	Discus throw	61.80 m
2022	World Championships	Eugene, United States	5th	Discus throw	64.24 m
2022	European Championships	Munich, Germany	3rd	Discus throw	65.20 m
2023	World Championships	Budapest, Hungary	10th	Discus throw	63.19 m
2024	European Championships	Rome, Italy	5th	Discus throw	62.65 m
2024	Olympic Games	Paris, France	6th	Discus throw	63.62 m

== Personal bests ==
Outdoor

- Shot put – 17.90 (Neubrandenburg 2016)
- Discus throw – 65.20 (Munich 2022)

Indoor

- Shot put – 18.09 (Belgrade 2017)
