= 2016 European Athletics Championships – Women's discus throw =

Women's discus throw at the European Athletics Championships
- Venue: Olympic Stadium
- Location: Amsterdam
- Dates: 6 July (qualification); 8 July (final)
- Competitors: 26 from 19 nations
- Winning mark: 69.97 m

Medalists
gold medal	Sandra Perković	Croatia
silver medal	Julia Fischer	Germany
bronze medal	Shanice Craft	Germany

The women's discus throw at the 2016 European Athletics Championships took place at the Olympic stadium for the finals and at the Museumplein for qualifying on 6 and 8 July.

== Records ==
Standing records prior to the 2016 European Athletics Championships
World record	Gabriele Reinsch (GDR)	76.80 m	Neubrandenburg, East Germany	9 July 1988
European record	Gabriele Reinsch (GDR)	76.80 m	Neubrandenburg, East Germany	9 July 1988
Championship record	Diana Gansky (GDR)	71.36 m	Stuttgart, West Germany	28 August 1986
World Leading	Sandra Perković (CRO)	70.88 m	Shanghai, China	14 May 2016
European Leading	Sandra Perković (CRO)	70.88 m	Shanghai, China	14 May 2016

== Schedule ==
Date	Time	Round
6 July 2016	12:00	Qualification
8 July 2016	20:15	Final

All times are local times (UTC+2)

== Results ==
=== Qualification ===
Qualification: 58.00 m (Q) or 12 best performers (q)

Rank	Group	Name	Nationality	#1	#2	#3	Result	Note
1	A	Julia Fischer	Germany	66.20			66.20	Q
2	B	Sandra Perković	Croatia	65.25			65.25	Q
3	A	Nadine Müller	Germany	64.75			64.75	Q
4	B	Shanice Craft	Germany	64.59			64.59	Q
5	A	Mélina Robert-Michon	France	63.99			63.99	Q
6	B	Dragana Tomašević	Serbia	x	60.51		60.51	Q, SB
7	B	Nataliya Semenova	Ukraine	60.33			60.33	Q
8	B	Eliška Staňková	Czech Republic	60.32			60.32	Q
9	B	Veronika Domjan	Slovenia	49.21	x	60.11	60.11	Q, NR
10	B	Pauline Pousse	France	x	60.06		60.06	Q
11	B	Stefania Strumillo	Italy	56.29	59.80		59.80	Q, PB
12	A	Sabina Asenjo	Spain	57.73	59.72		59.72	Q
13	A	Hrisoula Anagnostopoulou	Greece	56.50	59.13		59.13	Q
14	A	Zinaida Sendriūtė	Lithuania	57.47	56.97	58.88	58.88	Q
15	B	Jade Lally	Great Britain	58.76			58.76	Q
16	A	Sofia Larsson	Sweden	53.57	55.33	56.02	56.02	SB
17	A	Olha Abramchuk	Ukraine	50.23	56.00	53.89	56.00	
18	B	Corinne Nugter	Netherlands	53.16	52.28	55.52	55.52	
19	A	Salla Sipponen	Finland	x	54.95	51.84	54.95	
20	A	Natalia Stratulat	Moldova	54.45	x	x	54.45	
21	A	Kristina Rakočević	Montenegro	54.35	x	53.15	54.35	
22	B	Veronika Watzek	Austria	x	53.79	52.42	53.79	
23	A	Natalina Capoferri	Italy	46.64	53.16	50.44	53.16	
24	B	Julia Viberg	Sweden	x	52.82	x	52.82	
25	B	Valentina Aniballi	Italy	51.66	x	x	51.66	
26	A	Irina Rodrigues	Portugal	x	44.60	50.40	50.40	

=== Final ===
Rank	Athlete	Nationality	#1	#2	#3	#4	#5	#6	Result	Notes
1st place, gold medalist(s)	Sandra Perković	Croatia	62.60	63.09	x	66.03	69.97	x	69.97	
2nd place, silver medalist(s)	Julia Fischer	Germany	65.25	65.77	63.30	x	x	64.49	65.77	
3rd place, bronze medalist(s)	Shanice Craft	Germany	63.09	58.21	x	x	62.18	63.89	63.89	
4	Nadine Müller	Germany	62.63	62.12	60.55	x	x	x	62.63	
5	Mélina Robert-Michon	France	61.74	60.80	60.44	61.70	62.47	60.96	62.47	
6	Nataliya Semenova	Ukraine	56.75	62.21	x	x	56.54	61.45	62.21	
7	Jade Lally	Great Britain	53.42	59.88	54.44	x	60.29	x	60.29	
8	Pauline Pousse	France	59.62	55.76	58.32	x	x	x	59.62	
9	Hrisoula Anagnostopoulou	Greece	57.45	59.23	x				59.23	
10	Veronika Domjan	Slovenia	58.12	55.44	x				58.12	
11	Dragana Tomašević	Serbia	56.74	x	56.83				56.83	
12	Sabina Asenjo	Spain	54.74	56.62	56.58				56.58	
13	Zinaida Sendriūtė	Lithuania	51.31	53.20	56.17				56.17	
14	Eliška Staňková	Czech Republic	55.90	55.52	x				55.90	
15	Stefania Strumillo	Italy	55.78	x	x				55.78	
