= Taryn Gollshewsky =

Australian discus thrower (born 1993)

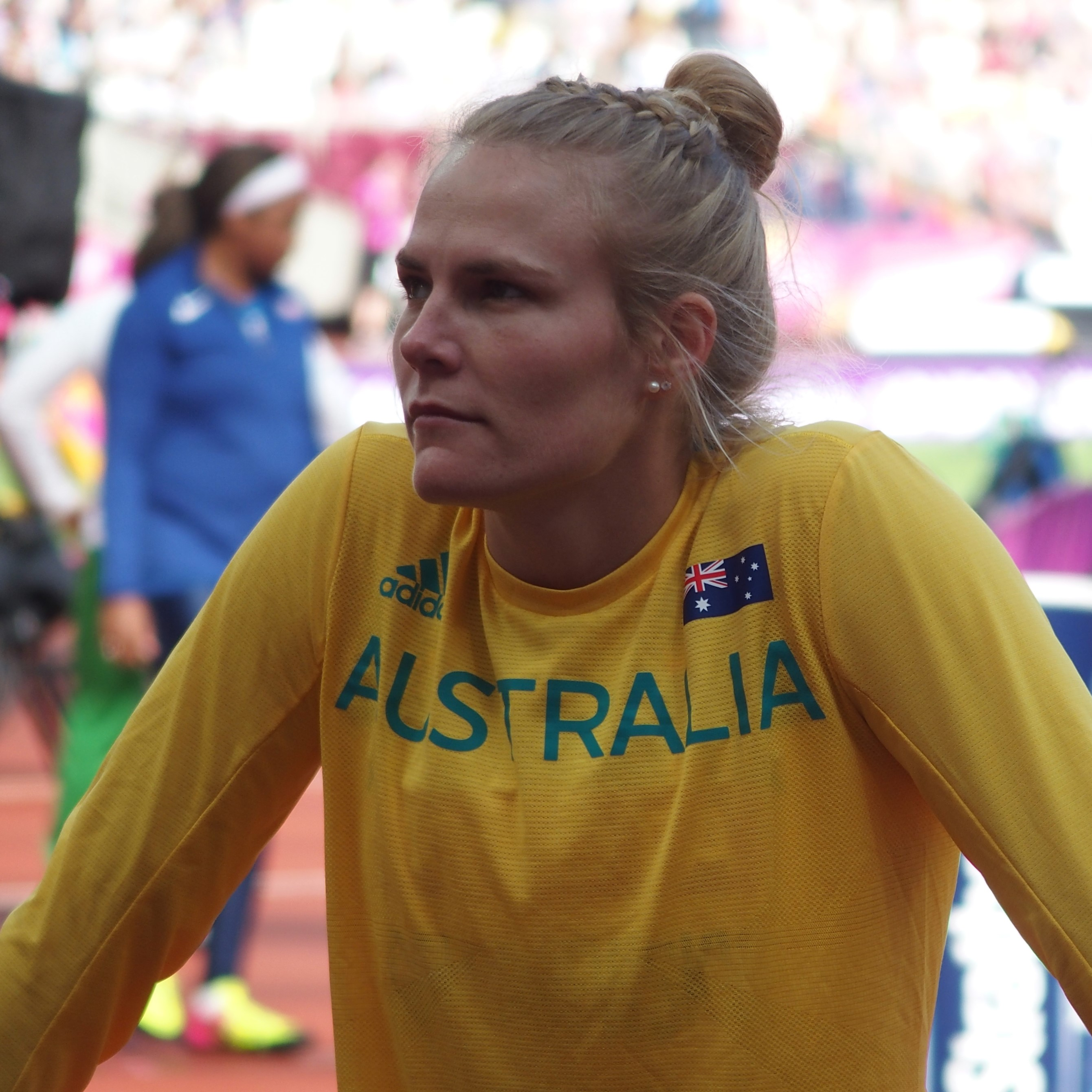
- Gollshewsky in 2017

Personal information
- Born: 18 May 1993 (age 33) Bundaberg, Australia
- Education: Central Queensland University
- Height: 1.82 m (6 ft 0 in)
- Weight: 75 kg (165 lb)

Sport
- Sport: Athletics
- Event: Discus throw
- Coached by: Les Kuorikoski
Medal record
Women's athletics
Representing Australia
Oceania Championships
Gold medal – first place	2024 Suva	Discus Throw

Taryn Linley Gollshewsky (born 18 May 1993) is an Australian athlete specialising in the discus throw. She represented her country at the 2024 Paris Olympic Games. In addition, she won a bronze medal at the 2017 Summer Universiade.

Her personal best of 62.36 metres was achieved at the 2024 Paris Olympic Games.

== International competitions ==
Year	Competition	Venue	Position	Event	Notes
Representing Australia
2009	World Youth Championships	Brixen, Italy	12th	Discus throw	43.84 m
2010	World Junior Championships	Moncton, Canada	25th (q)	Discus throw	43.97 m
2014	Commonwealth Games	Glasgow, United Kingdom	9th	Discus throw	53.04 m
2015	Universiade	Gwangju, South Korea	9th	Discus throw	53.91 m
2017	World Championships	London, United Kingdom	27th (q)	Discus throw	54.29 m
2017	Universiade	Taipei, Taiwan	3rd	Discus throw	58.11 m
2018	Commonwealth Games	Gold Coast, Australia	5th	Discus throw	55.47 m
2022	Commonwealth Games	Birmingham, United Kingdom	4th	Discus throw	56.85 m
2023	World Championships	Budapest, Hungary	20th (q)	Discus throw	58.63 m
2024	Olympic Games	Paris, France	15th	Discus throw	62.36 m
2025	World Championships	Tokyo, Japan	34th (q)	Discus throw	55.40 m
