= Daria Zabawska =

Polish discus thrower (born 1995)

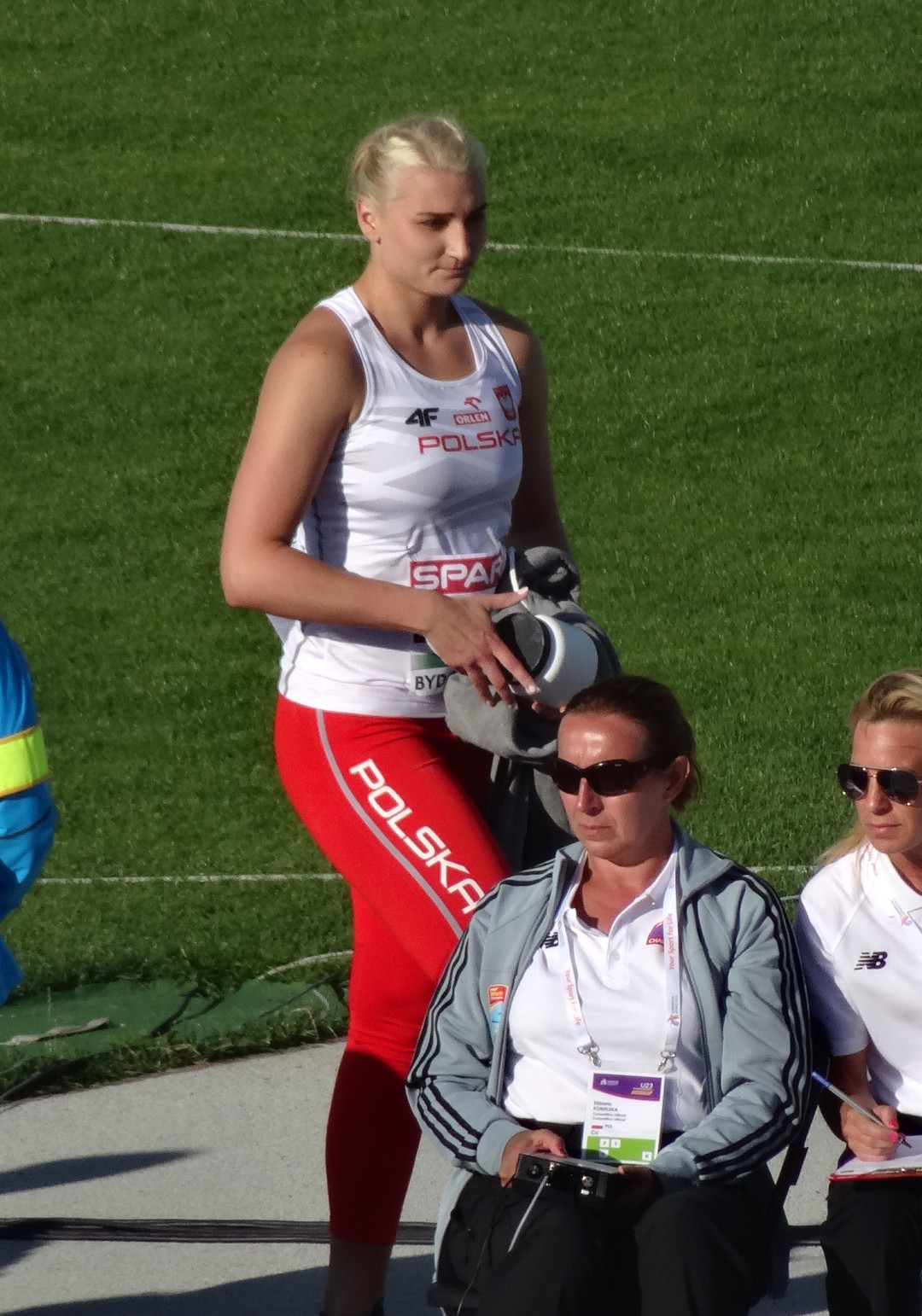
- Daria Zabawska in 2017

Personal information
- Full name: Daria Katarzyna Zabawska
- Born: 16 April 1995 (age 31) Białystok, Poland
- Education: Bialystok University of Technology
- Height: 1.85 m (6 ft 1 in)
- Weight: 92 kg (203 lb)

Sport
- Sport: Athletics
- Event: Discus throw
- Club: KS Podlasie Białystok (2010-)
- Coached by: Przemysław Zabawski
Medal record
Athletics
Representing Poland
European U23 Championships
Silver medal – second place	2017 Bydgoszcz	discus throw

Daria Zabawska (born 16 April 1995 in Białystok) is a Polish athlete specialising in the discus throw. She won a silver medal at the 2017 European U23 Championships.

Her personal best in the event is 60.23 metres set in Tallinn in 2015.

Her parents are former shot putters, Krystyna Danilczyk-Zabawska and Przemysław Zabawski, the latter being also her coach.

== International competitions ==
Year	Competition	Venue	Position	Notes
Representing Poland
2014	World Junior Championships	Eugene, United States	24th (q)	45.13 m
2015	European U23 Championships	Tallinn, Estonia	4th	59.06 m
2017	European U23 Championships	Bydgoszcz, Poland	2nd	59.08 m
2017	Universiade	Taipei, Taiwan	4th	56.58 m
2017	DécaNation	Angers, France	3rd	57.71 m
2018	European Championships	Berlin, Germany	22nd (q)	53.94 m
2019	Universiade	Naples, Italy	13th (q)	51.51 m
2019	World Championships	Doha, Qatar	22nd (q)	57.05 m
2022	European Championships	Munich, Germany	15th (q)	56.54 m
2023	World Championships	Budapest, Hungary	16th (q)	59.28 m
2024	European Championships	Rome, Italy	14th (q)	59.02 m
2024	Olympic Games	Paris, France	20th (q)	60.86 m
2025	World Championships	Tokyo, Japan	28th (q)	57.78 m
2026	European Championships	Birmingham, United Kingdom	10th	58.54 m
