= Stefania Strumillo =

Italian discus thrower

Personal information
- Born: 14 October 1989 (age 36) Portomaggiore, Italy
- Education: University of Cassino and Southern Lazio
- Height: 1.82 m (6 ft 0 in)
- Weight: 81 kg (179 lb)

Sport
- Sport: Athletics
- Event: Discus throw
- Club: G.S. Fiamme Azzurre; Atletica 2005
- Coached by: Roberto Casciani

Achievements and titles
- Personal best: Discus throw: 59.80 m (2016)
Medal record
Universiade
Bronze medal – third place	2015 Gwangju	Discus throw

Stefania Strumillo (born 14 October 1989) is an Italian athlete specialising in the discus throw.

== Biography ==
She won the bronze medal at the 2015 Summer Universiade. Her personal best in the event is 59.80 metres set in Amsterdam in 2016.

== Achievements ==
Year	Competition	Venue	Position	Event	Notes
Representing Italy
2008	World Junior Championships	Bydgoszcz, Poland	–	Discus throw	NM (q)
2015	Universiade	Gwangju, South Korea	3rd	Discus throw	58.22 m
2016	European Championships	Amsterdam, Netherlands	12th	Discus throw	55.78 m
2017	Universiade	Taipei, Taiwan	5th	Discus throw	56.16 m
2022	Mediterranean Games	Oran, Algeria	4th	Discus throw	55.93 m
2022	European Championships	Munich, Germany	13th (q)	Discus throw	56.90 m
2024	European Championships	Rome, Italy	17th (q)	Discus throw	57.04 m

== National titles ==
Strumillo won sixnational championships at individual senior level.

- Italian Athletics Championships
  - Shot put: 2015, 2016, 2017, 2019 (4)
- Italian Winter Throwing Championships
  - Discus throw: 2015, 2021 (2)

== See also ==
- Italian all-time lists - Discus throw
