= Yuliya Maltseva =

Russian discus thrower

Personal information
- Born: 30 November 1990 (age 35)
- Education: Russian State University of Physical Education, Sport, Youth and Tourism

Sport
- Sport: Track and field
- Event: Discus throw
- Club: ASK Moscow
- Coached by: M.V. Ivanov; N.O. Kalenskaya

Yuliya Gennadyevna Maltseva (Russian: Юлия Геннадьевна Мальцева; born 30 November 1990) is a Russian track and field athlete whose speciality is the discus throw. She competed at the 2015 World Championships in Beijing without qualifying for the final. She also won the gold medal at the 2015 Summer Universiade.

Her personal best in the event is 63.48 metres set in Montreuil-sous-Bois in 2015.

== Competition record ==
Year	Competition	Venue	Position	Event	Notes
Representing Russia
2009	European Junior Championships	Novi Sad, Serbia	10th	Discus throw	44.92 m
2014	European Championships	Zürich, Switzerland	8th	Discus throw	60.40 m
2015	Universiade	Gwangju, South Korea	1st	Discus throw	59.37 m
2015	World Championships	Beijing, China	25th (q)	Discus throw	57.08 m
Competing as Authorised Neutral Athlete
2018	European Championships	Berlin, Germany	25th (q)	Discus throw	53.50 m
