= Athletics at the 2018 Commonwealth Games – Women's discus throw =

Women's discus throw at the 2018 Commonwealth Games
- Venue: Carrara Stadium
- Dates: 12 April
- Competitors: 13 from 9 nations
- Winning distance: 68.26 m GR

Medalists
| gold medal | Dani Stevens | Australia |
| silver medal | Seema Punia | India |
| bronze medal | Navjeet Dhillon | India |

The women's discus throw at the 2018 Commonwealth Games, as part of the athletics programme, took place in the Carrara Stadium on 12 April 2018.

The winning margin was 7.85 metres which as of 2024 remains the only time the women's discus throw has been won by more than 7 metres at these games.

== Records ==
Prior to this competition, the existing world and Games records were as follows:

| World record | Gabriele Reinsch (GDR) | 76.80 m | Neubrandenburg, East Germany | 9 July 1988 |
| Games record | Dani Stevens (AUS) | 68.26 m | gold Coast, Australia | 12 April 2018 |

== Schedule ==
The schedule was as follows:

| Date | Time | Round |
|---|---|---|
| Thursday 12 April 2018 | 20:40 | Final |

All times are Australian Eastern Standard Time (UTC+10)

== Results ==
With thirteen entrants, the event was held as a straight final.

=== Final ===
| Rank | Name | #1 | #2 | #3 | #4 | #5 | #6 | Result | Notes |
|---|---|---|---|---|---|---|---|---|---|
| 1st place, gold medalist(s) | Dani Stevens (AUS) | 61.39 | 64.51 | 65.43 | 68.26 | 65.10 | x | 68.26 | GR |
| 2nd place, silver medalist(s) | Seema Punia (IND) | 60.41 | 59.57 | x | 58.54 | x | 58.90 | 60.41 | |
| 3rd place, bronze medalist(s) | Navjeet Dhillon (IND) | 55.61 | x | x | 56.22 | 54.09 | 57.43 | 57.43 | |
| 4 | Siositina Hakeai (NZL) | 56.00 | 55.19 | 57.16 | 56.94 | 53.86 | 56.96 | 57.16 | |
| 5 | Taryn Gollshewsky (AUS) | 54.59 | x | 54.45 | 53.23 | x | 55.47 | 55.47 | |
| 6 | Kimberley Mulhall (AUS) | 53.72 | 54.93 | 54.64 | 51.72 | 54.32 | 54.84 | 54.93 | |
| 7 | Jade Lally (ENG) | 51.80 | 53.97 | 52.97 | 53.44 | 52.16 | x | 53.97 | |
| 8 | Androniki Lada (CYP) | 53.12 | x | 52.07 | x | x | x | 53.12 | SB |
| 9 | Tynelle Gumbs (IVB) | 47.04 | x | x | — | | | 47.04 | |
| 10 | Tereapii Tapoki (COK) | 46.01 | x | 44.93 | — | | | 46.01 | |
| 11 | Salomé Mugabe (MOZ) | 45.72 | 44.35 | 43.80 | — | | | 45.72 | PB |
| – | Trevia Gumbs (IVB) | x | r | | — | | | NM | |
| – | Chanana Jeremiah (NRU) | x | x | x | — | | | NM | |
