= Athletics at the 2014 Commonwealth Games – Women's discus throw =

Women's discus throw at the Commonwealth Games

The Women's discus throw at the 2014 Commonwealth Games, as part of the athletics programme, took place at Hampden Park on 31 July and 1 August 2014.

== Results ==
=== Qualifying round ===
Rank	Name	#1	#2	#3	Result	Notes
1	Dani Samuels (AUS)	64.53			64.53	Q
2	Seema Punia (IND)	x	x	58.44	58.44	Q
3	Taryn Gollshewsky (AUS)	52.44	58.24		58.24	Q/PB
4	Siositina Hakeai (NZL)	54.40	56.27	57.19	57.19	Q
5	Jade Lally (ENG)	54.94	55.03	57.13	57.13	Q
6	Kellion Knibb (JAM)	52.37	54.34	56.64	56.64	q
7	Eden Francis (ENG)	48.22	55.05	x	55.05	q
8	Kirsty Law (SCO)	54.33	54.68	x	54.68	q
9	Danniel Thomas (JAM)	53.31	53.30	54.32	54.32	q
10	Christie Chamberlain (AUS)	49.45	52.46	51.08	52.46	q
11	Krishna Poonia (IND)	x	x	51.36	51.36	q
12	Julie Labonte (CAN)	x	50.32	49.20	50.32	q
13	Androniki Lada (CYP)	49.78	x	x	49.78	
14	Shadine Duquemin (JER)	43.49	47.67	48.77	48.77	
15	Annie Alexander (TRI)	x	47.73	40.02	47.73	
16	Julia Agawu (GHA)	x	39.33	41.79	41.79	
	Auriol Dongmo Mekemnang (CMR)				DNS	

=== Final ===
Rank	Name	#1	#2	#3	#4	#5	#6	Result	Notes
1st place, gold medalist(s)	Dani Samuels (AUS)	62.30	61.45	64.88	60.18	x	61.72	64.88	
2nd place, silver medalist(s)	Seema Punia (IND)	53.64	58.87	58.62	x	61.61	x	61.61	SB
3rd place, bronze medalist(s)	Jade Lally (ENG)	57.69	59.56	59.98	57.39	60.48	57.27	60.48	SB
4	Siositina Hakeai (NZL)	57.94	x	x	x	58.67	57.31	58.67	
5	Krishna Poonia (IND)	x	52.79	57.84	56.83	56.55	55.58	57.84	
6	Kellion Knibb (JAM)	42.86	57.39	x	x	x	x	57.39	
7	Eden Francis (ENG)	41.02	55.80	x	53.65	x	x	55.80	
8	Danniel Thomas (JAM)	53.84	x	55.02	54.84	53.45	x	55.02	
9	Taryn Gollshewsky (AUS)	44.18	53.04	49.11				53.04	
10	Christie Chamberlain (AUS)	52.61	49.49	51.24				52.61	
11	Kirsty Law (SCO)	51.95	52.21	52.33				52.33	
12	Julie Labonte (CAN)	50.74	52.30	x				52.30	
