= Jade Lally =

British discus thrower (born 1987)

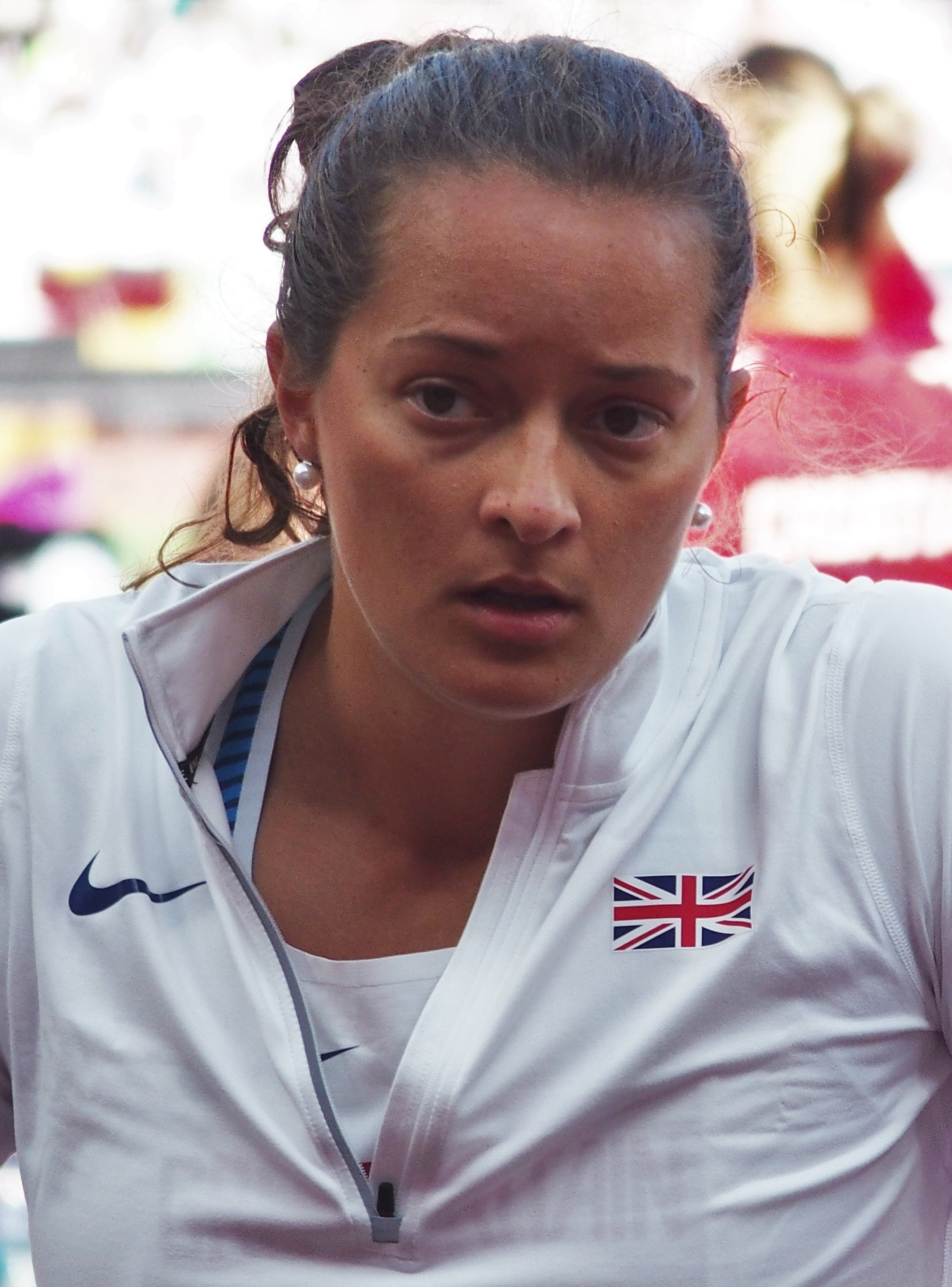

Personal information
- Nationality: British
- Born: 30 March 1987 (age 39) Tooting, England
- Height: 1.82 m (6 ft 0 in)
- Weight: 83 kg (183 lb)
- Website: jadelally.com

Sport
- Country: England
- Sport: Women's athletics
- Event: Discus
- Club: Shaftesbury Barnet Harriers
Medal record
Representing England
Commonwealth Games
Silver medal – second place	2022 Birmingham	Discus throw
Bronze medal – third place	2014 Glasgow	Discus throw
- Updated on 3 October 2014

Jade Louise Lally (born 30 March 1987) is a British track and field athlete. She won a bronze medal for England in the women's discus at the 2014 Commonwealth Games, a silver at the 2022 Commonwealth Games and represented Great Britain at the 2016 Rio Olympics. Her personal best is 65.10m set at the New South Wales Open Championships (AUS) on 27 February 2016.

Jade is also an indoor rowing competitor and world championship medalist. She finished in 2nd place at the 2022 WRICH in the 500m open sprint event with a time of 1:28.7. She currently holds the British records in the 100m, 1 minute and 500m.

== Career ==
Born in Tooting, Lally grew up on Phipps Bridge Estate and attended Bishopsford Community High School. Lally began athletics as a high jumper. This began her interest in the sport and led to her joining her first club, Hercules Wimbledon AC, where she took up discus throwing. At the English Schools' Athletics Championships, she finished sixth in 2004, and seventh in 2005, before going on to win the 2006 AAA Junior Championships title, with a distance of 46.60.

Lally won a bronze medal at the 2009 European U23 Championships in the discus throw, with a throw of 54.44 metres. She won the 2010 British Championships and went on to represent England at that year's Commonwealth Games, where she finished sixth in the discus throw. In 2011, she won both the British and English Championships.

Lally retained her English Championships title in 2012, and went on to compete at that year's European Championships, being knocked out in the discus throw competition in qualifying after her second-worst performance of the year, finishing 22nd. This was her first senior British international competition. She was overlooked for selection to go to what would have been a home Olympics despite achieving two B standard qualifying marks and finishing in the top two at the British Championships.

At the European Team Championships, Lally finished sixth in 2013, and eighth in 2014. before going on to win a bronze medal at the 2014 Commonwealth Games in Glasgow in the discus throw, with a throw of 60.48 metres.

After winning her fourth British and English Championship title in 2015, Lally broke the English discus record with a throw of 64.22 metres at the Auckland Track Challenge on 25 February 2016, then improved it to 65.10 metres at the New South Wales Championships on 27 February 2016. This performance ranks her second on the British all-time list behind Scotland's Meg Ritchie. She also holds the British indoor discus throw record, with a mark of 58.97 metres from the World Indoor Throws in Vaxjo, Sweden in 2013. and holds two club records in Under 23 and Senior discus at Shaftesbury Barnet Harriers.

== Personal life ==
In April 2019 she spoke about her pregnancy as an athlete. Her daughter was born in July 2019.

== International competitions ==
Year	Competition	Venue	Position	Notes
Representing Great Britain / England
2009	European Under 23 Championships	Kaunas, Lithuania	3rd	54.44 m
2010	Commonwealth Games	Delhi, India	6th	57.62 m
2012	European Championships	Helsinki, Finland	22nd (q)	51.75 m
2014	Commonwealth Games	Glasgow, United Kingdom	3rd	60.48 m
2016	European Championships	Amsterdam, Netherlands	7th	60.29 m
2016	Olympic Games	Rio de Janeiro, Brazil	28th (q)	54.06 m
2017	World Championships	London, United Kingdom	18th (q)	57.71 m
2018	Commonwealth Games	Gold Coast, Australia	7th	53.97 m
2018	European Championships	Munich, Germany	11th	57.33 m
2022	European Championships	Berlin, Germany	9th	57.08 m
2022	Commonwealth Games	Birmingham, England	2nd	58.42 m
2022	World Championships	Eugene, Oregon	18th (q)	58.21 m
