= Tatiana Zhuravleva =

Russian discus thrower (born 1989)

Zhuravleva Tatiana Alexandrovna (born 27 May 1989 in Kazan, Russian Federation) is a Russian discus thrower. Tatiana is a member of the Russian national team. Tatiana moved to the United States in 2011. In 2014, she won the NCAA Outdoor Championships with 56.10 m. She became third at the Russian Championship in 2014. She qualified for the World University Games in Korea in 2015. Tatiana qualified for the European Championship in 2016, but because of the ban of her country could not compete there. She is currently studying and practicing in the States.
