= Veronika Domjan =

Slovenian discus thrower (born 1996)

Personal information
- Born: 3 September 1996 (age 29)
- Height: 1.78 m (5 ft 10 in)
- Weight: 88 kg (194 lb)

Sport
- Sport: Athletics
- Event: Discus throw

Veronika Domjan (born 3 September 1996) is a Slovenian athlete specialising in the discus throw. She won the silver medal at the 2015 European Junior Championships.

Her personal best in the event is 60.11 metres set in Amsterdam in 2016. This is the current national record.

== International competitions ==
| Year | Competition | Venue | Position | Event | Notes |
Representing Slovenia
| 2013 | World Youth Championships | Donetsk, Ukraine | 45th (q) | Shot put (3 kg) | 13.50 m |
| 2013 | World Youth Championships | Donetsk, Ukraine | 4th | Discus throw | 47.66 m |
| 2014 | World Junior Championships | Eugene, United States | 18th (q) | Discus throw | 47.07 m |
| 2015 | European Junior Championships | Eskilstuna, Sweden | 2nd | Discus throw | 56.63 m |
| 2016 | European Championships | Amsterdam, Netherlands | 10th | Discus throw | 58.12 m |
| 2017 | European U23 Championships | Bydgoszcz, Poland | 3rd | Discus throw | 58.48 m |
| 2018 | Mediterranean Games | Tarragona, Spain | 7th | Discus throw | 56.26 m |
| 2018 | European Championships | Berlin, Germany | 27th (q) | Discus throw | 49.89 m |
| 2019 | Universiade | Naples, Italy | 8th | Discus throw | 53.96 m |
