= Marike Steinacker =

German discus thrower

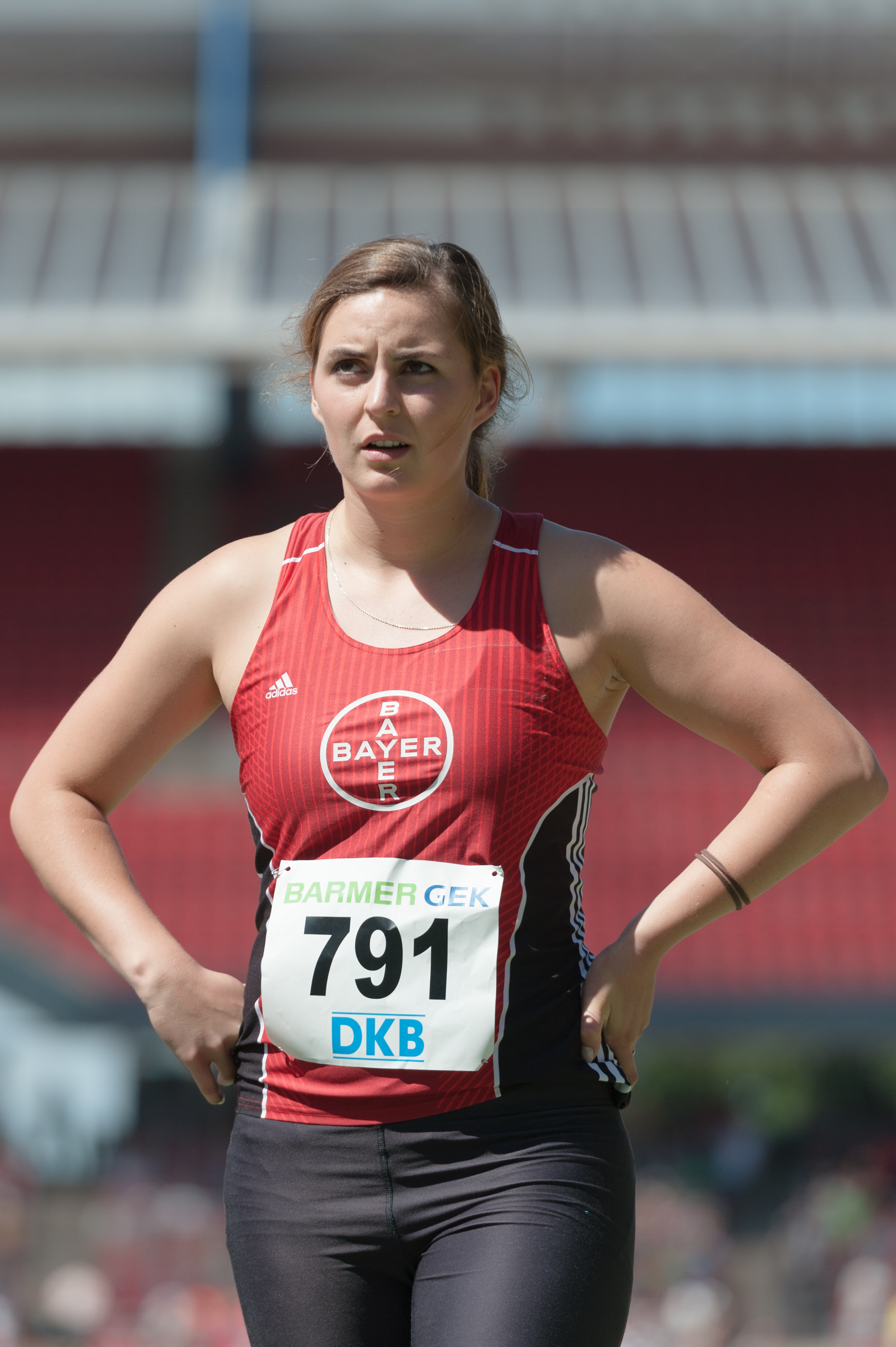
- Steinacker in 2015

Personal information
- Nationality: German
- Born: 3 April 1992 (age 34) Wermelskirchen, Germany
- Height: 6 ft 1 in (185 cm)
- Weight: 189 lb (86 kg)

Sport
- Sport: Athletics
- Event: Discus
Medal record
Men's athletics
Representing Germany
European Throwing Cup
Bronze medal – third place	2025 Nicosia	Discus Throw
Universiade
Silver medal – second place	2015 Gwangju	Discus throw

Marike Steinacker (born 3 April 1992) is a German athlete. She competed in the women's discus throw event at the 2020 and 2024 Olympic Games, placing fourth overall in Paris in 2024.

== Career ==
She won the silver medal in the discus throw at the 2015 University Games in Gwangju. She is a member of TSV Bayer 04's track and field department in Leverkusen, and threw a new personal best distance of 63.24 metres whilst competing in May 2019.

Steinacker threw the Olympic qualifying standard in May 2021 at the Halle Throwing Days event, managing a new personal best of 64.03 metres. She subsequently competed in the women's discus throw event at the delayed 2020 Olympic Games in Tokyo, Japan in August 2021, playing eighth overall.

She would go on to throw a new personal best of 64.55m in 2022. She threw the new Olympic standard in May 2024, whilst competing in Wiesbaden, where she managed a distance of 67.31 metres. This distance was also a TSV Bayer 04 club distance, the previous of which had been held since 1972 by Liesel Westermann, with 64.96m. She went into the summer months ranked as the number one in Europe and fourth in the world. She had a disappointing twelfth place finish at the 2024 European Athletics Championships in Rome, Italy in June 2024. Later that month she finished runner-up at the German Athletics Championships. She competed at the 2024 Olympic Games in Paris, France, where she qualified for the final before throwing 65.37 metres to place fourth overall.

She finished in place third at the 2025 European Throwing Cup in Nicosia, Cyprus with a throw of 61.57 metres, in March 2025.
