= Milica Vukadinović =

Serbian basketball player (born 1968)

Personal information
- Born: 18 November 1968 (age 57) Belgrade, Yugoslavia
- Listed height: 185 cm (6 ft 1 in)
- Listed weight: 68 kg (150 lb)

Career information
- College: California (1991–1993)
- Position: Point guard

Career history

Playing
- –1991: ŽKK Crvena zvezda
- 1997: Charlotte Sting

Coaching
- 1997–1998: California (assistant)
- 1998–1999: Cal State Fullerton (assistant)

Career highlights
- Kodak All-American (1993); 2× First-team All Pac-10 (1992, 1993)
- Stats at Basketball Reference

Milica Vukadinović (born 18 November 1968) is a Serbian former basketball player.

== Career ==
She grew up in Belgrade, Yugoslavia, where she played for ŽKK Crvena zvezda and the Yugoslavian national team. She played college basketball for University of California, Berkeley where she was a two time First-team All-PAC-10 selection. Following her college stay, she played professionally in Germany for four seasons. She became the first Serbian player to play in the WNBA when she appeared in Charlotte Sting's opener of the 1997 WNBA season on 22 June where she scored 3 points in 14 minutes. That ended being her only WNBA game as a back injury that she suffered in the game ended her season. In 1999, she was set to join the Los Angeles Sparks but the deal fell through due to visa problems.

== Career statistics ==
Legend
GP	Games played	GS	Games started	MPG	Minutes per game	RPG	Rebounds per game
APG	Assists per game	SPG	Steals per game	BPG	Blocks per game	PPG	Points per game
TO	Turnovers per game	FG%	Field-goal percentage	3P%	3-point field-goal percentage	FT%	Free-throw percentage
**Bold**	Career best	°	League leader

=== WNBA ===
==== Regular season ====
Year	Team	GP	GS	MPG	FG%	3P%	FT%	RPG	APG	SPG	BPG	TO	PPG
1997	Charlotte	1	0	14.0	100.0	100.0	0.0	1.0	1.0	1.0	0.0	3.0	3.0
Career	1 year, 1 team	1	0	14.0	100.0	100.0	0.0	1.0	1.0	1.0	0.0	3.0	3.0

=== College ===
Year	Team	GP	GS	MPG	FG%	3P%	FT%	RPG	APG	SPG	BPG	TO	PPG
1991–92	California	29	-	-	**44.3**	**41.2**	**75.8**	4.7	**6.2**	2.1	0.3	-	15.3
1992–93	California	29	-	-	38.0	36.9	70.4	**5.4**	6.1	**2.8**	**0.7**	-	**16.1**
**Career**		58	-	-	40.8	38.9	72.9	5.1	6.2	2.5	0.5	-	15.7
Statistics retrieved from Sports-Reference.

== See also ==
- List of Serbian WNBA players
