= Kirsty Law =

Scottish discus thrower (born 1986)

Personal information
- Nationality: British (Scottish)
- Born: 11 October 1986 (age 39)

Sport
- Sport: Athletics
- Event: Discus throw
- Club: Sale Harriers
- Coached by: Zane Duquemin

Kirsty Law (born 11 October 1986) is a Scottish athlete specialising in the discus throw.

== Biography ==
Law competed for Scotland at the discus throw event at the 2014 Commonwealth Games in Glasgow.

She became British discus throw champion when winning the discus throw event at the 2019 British Athletics Championships and successfully defended the title the following year at the 2020 British Athletics Championships with a throw of 57.95 metres and defeating six times champion Jade Lally.

At the 2022 Commonwealth Games in Birmingham, Law made her second appearance for Scotland in the discus throw event.

Law has since podiumed at the British Championships in 2022, 2023 and 2025.
