= Elçin Kaya =

Turkish athlete (born 1993)

- The signature of Kaya.

Personal information
- Born: 1 March 1993 (age 33) Beypazarı, Ankara, Turkey

Sport
- Country: Turkey
Medal record
Representing Turkey
Balkan Youth Championships
Silver medal – second place	2008 Bar	Discus throw
Silver medal – second place	2008 Bar	Shot put
Balkan Games
Bronze medal – third place	2013 Stara Zagora	Discus throw
Islamic Solidarity Games
Gold medal – first place	2013 Palembang	Discus throw

Elçin Kaya (born 1 March 1993 in Beypazarı, Ankara) is a Turkish female track and field athlete competing in shot put and discus.

== International competitions ==
Year	Competition	Venue	Position	Event	Notes
Representing Turkey
2008	Balkan Youth Championships	Bar, Montenegro	2nd	Discus throw	39.80 m
2008	Balkan Youth Championships	Bar, Montenegro	2nd	Shot put	12.41 m
2009	World Youth Championships	Brixen, Italy	8th	Shot put	13.49 m
2009	World Youth Championships	Brixen, Italy	18th (q)	Discus throw	41.90 m
2011	European Junior Championships	Tallinn, Estonia	7th	Discus throw	47.88 m
2012	World Junior Championships	Barcelona, Spain	29th (q)	Discus throw	44.19 m
2013	Balkan Games	Stara Zagora, Bulgaria	3rd	Discus throw	50.80 m
2013	Islamic Solidarity Games	Palembang, Indonesia	1st	Discus throw	53.33 m
2014	European Team Championships	Braunschweig, Germany	11th	Discus throw	50.10 m
2014	Balkan Games	Pitești, Romania	5th	Discus throw	48.25 m
2014	14th European Throwing Championship	leiria, Portugal	3rd	Discus throw	51.41 m
2015	European U23 Championships	Tallinn, Estonia	21st (q)	Discus	46.67 m

== Personal bests ==
Event	Best	Venue	Date
Discus	53.33 m	Palembang, Indonesia	25 September 2013
Shot put	14.32 m	Mersin, Turkey	6 March 2010

Last updated 28 July 2015.
