= Anna Rüh =

German discus thrower

Personal information
- Born: 17 June 1993 (age 33) Greifswald, Germany
- Height: 1.86 m (6 ft 1 in)
- Weight: 79 kg (174 lb)

Sport
- Country: Germany
- Sport: Athletics
- Events: Discus throw, shot put

Achievements and titles
- Olympic finals: 10th at the 2012 Summer Olympics
- Regional finals: 4th at the 2012 European Athletics Championships
- National finals: 3rd at the 2012 German Athletics Championships
- Personal bests: Discus: 66.14 m (Wiesbaden, May 2015); Shot put: 17.68 m (Leipzig, February 2016)

Anna Rüh (born 17 June 1993 in Greifswald) is a German athlete who specialises in the discus throw.

Rüh represented Germany at the 2012 European Athletics Championships where she finished 4th in the discus event with a throw of 62.65 metres.

== Achievements ==
Year	Competition	Venue	Position	Event	Notes
Representing Germany
2010	World Junior Championships	Moncton, New Brunswick, Canada	21st (q)	Discus	46.32 m
2011	European Junior Championships	Tallinn, Estonia	2nd	Discus	58.10 m
2011	European Junior Championships	Tallinn, Estonia	3rd	Shot put	16.01 m, PB
2012	German Championships	Bochum, Germany	3rd	Discus	63.14 m, PB
2012	European Championships	Helsinki, Finland	4th	Discus	62.65 m
2012	World Junior Championships	Barcelona, Spain	1st	Discus	62.38 m
2012	Olympic Games	London, United Kingdom	10th	Discus	61.36 m
2013	European U23 Championships	Tampere, Finland	1st	Discus	61.45 m
2014	European Championships	Zürich, Switzerland	4th	Discus	62.46 m
2015	European U23 Championships	Tallinn, Estonia	2nd	Discus	61.27 m
2017	World Championships	London, United Kingdom	14th (q)	Discus	60.78 m
