= Daisy Osakue =

Nigerian and Italian discus thrower

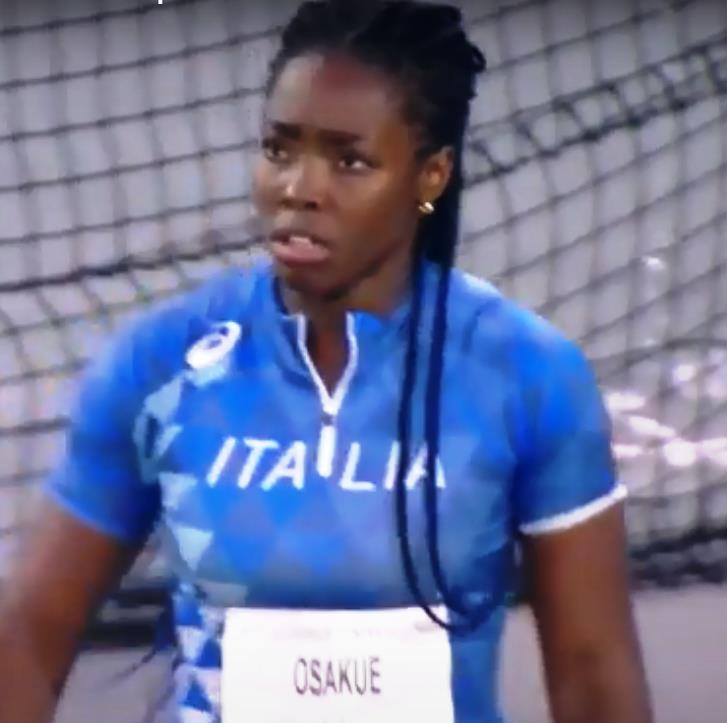
- Daisy Osakue in 2019.

Personal information
- Full name: Daisy Oyemwenosa Osakue
- Born: 16 January 1996 (age 30) Turin, Italy
- Height: 1.80 m (5 ft 11 in)
- Weight: 74 kg (163 lb)

Sport
- Country: Italy
- Sport: Athletics
- Event: Discus throw
- Club: Sisport SSD; Fiamme Gialle
- Coached by: Maria Marello (in Italy); Nate Janusey (in USA)

Achievements and titles
- Personal best: Discus throw: 64.68 m (2026)
Medal record
Women's athletics
Representing Italy
European Games
Silver medal – second place	2023 Kraków-Małopolska	Discus throw
Universiade
Gold medal – first place	2019 Naples	Discus throw
Mediterranean Games
Silver medal – second place	2026 Taranto	Discus throw

Daisy Oyemwenosa Osakue (born 16 January 1996) is an Italian discus thrower who came 5th at the 2018 European Athletics Championships. She competed at the 2020 Summer Olympics, in Discus throw.

Osakue holds the NCAA Division II women's discus record of 61.35 m, and her throw of 63.66 m on 31 July 2021 during the qualifying round of the 2021 Tokyo Olympics established a new national record for Italy. Osakue's Coach is Maria Marello, former Italian discus thrower.

== Biography ==
Osakue was born in Turin to Nigerian parents and became a naturalized Italian citizen at the age of 18.

== Athletics accomplishments ==
She attended Angelo State University in San Angelo, Texas, where she became an eight-time NCAA Division II All-American in the women's discus. She is a two-time Division II national champion (2018 and 2019). In 2019 she set the Division II record for the longest discus throw at 61.35 metres (201 feet 3 inches) She is also a second team Division II All-American in the high jump. In 2018, after having established the 4th all-time Italian performance in the discus throw, she obtained the standard FIDAL and EAA and was called by DT Elio Locatelli to represent Italy at the European Championships in Berlin. In 2021 she participated in the 2020 Olympics in Tokyo, representing Italy.

== Assault ==
On 30 July 2018, in her home town of Moncalieri, an egg was thrown at Osakue from a passing car. Her eye needed to be surgically operated on to remove a shard of the egg's shell. Osakue believed the egging was because of racism. Three young men, including the son of a local Democratic Party councillor, were indicted; one admitted seven cases of egging strangers in the last two months. The case went to trial without an aggravated charge of racial motivation, which was not contested by prosecutors. Many Italian politicians, foreign and domestic news websites, published fake news about the case.

== Statistics ==
=== National records ===
- Discus throw (Under 23): 59.72 m ( (United States) San Angelo, Texas, 8 April 2018) - current holder
- Discus throw: 64.57 m ( (Italy) Pietrasanta, 11 June 2023) - current holder

== Achievements ==
Year	Competition	Venue	Position	Measure	Notes
2017	European Team Championships	(France) Lille	6th	57.64 m	
2018	Mediterranean Games	(Spain) Tarragona	11th	51.49 m	
2018	European Championships	(Germany) Berlin	5th	59.32 m	
2019	Summer Universiade	(Italy) Naples	1st	61.69 m	
2021	Summer Olympics	(Japan) Tokyo	12th	59.97 m	63.66 m NR in qual.

== National titles ==
Osakue won six national championships at individual senior level.

- Italian Athletics Championships
  - Discus throw: 2020, 2021, 2022, 2023
- Italian Winter Throwing Championships
  - Discus throw: 2022, 2023

== See also ==
- Italian all-time lists - discus throw
- Naturalized athletes of Italy
- Italy at the 2018 European Athletics Championships
