= Ieva Gumbs =

Lithuanian athlete (born 1994)

Ieva Zarankaitè
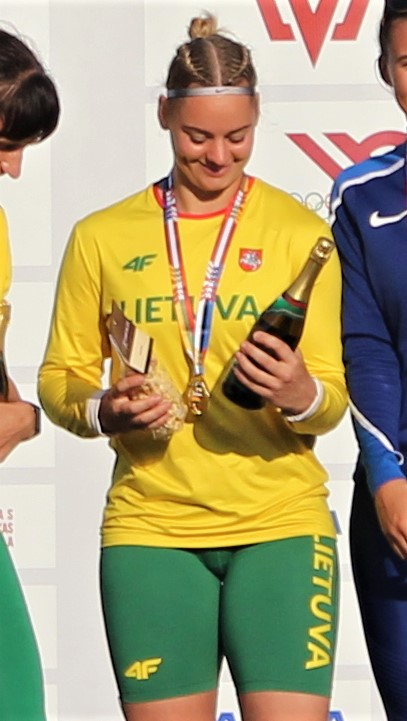
- Zarankaitė receiving her prize at Ogre, President prize of Latvia in 2020.

Personal information
- Nationality: Lithuanian
- Born: November 23, 1994 (age 31)

Sport
- Sport: Athletics
- Event: Discus throw
- Coached by: Vita Zarankienė

Achievements and titles
- Personal best: 64.98 m (2024)
Medal record
Women's athletics
Representing Lithuania
Universiade
Bronze medal – third place	2019 Naples	Discus throw

Ieva Zarankaitė-Gumbs (born 23 November 1994) is a Lithuanian track and field athlete who competes in discus and shot put with multiple national titles. She competed at the 2024 Olympic Games.

== Early and personal life ==
Her mother, Vita Zarankienė, is a former discus thrower and acts as her coach, as well as for her sister Eglė. They lived in Utena. She also competed in swimming at a young age. Zarankaitė studied business management on a scholarship at Oklahoma State University where she first met Michael Gumbs. The pair married in 2023. She went on study for a graduate degree at Florida State University. In the United States, she competed within the collegiate system and at the NCAA level.

== Career ==
In 2019, at the Lithuania Athletics Championships, she won national titles in both the discus throw and the shot put. At the 2019 Summer Universiade in Naples she won a bronze medal in the discus.

In August 2020, she successfully defended both national championship titles. On 21 July 2020 in Vilnius, Lithuania, Zarankaitè managed a distance of 61.88 metres for the discus throw, which placed her sixteenth worldwide on the end-of-year rankings.

On 25 June 2021, at the Lithuanian Athletics Championships, she achieved 62.08 metres to become Lithuanian national champion in the discus throw. On the same day, she reached 15.47m in the shot put to complete the double for the third consecutive season, and become Lithuanian national champion in the shot put as well.

She finished fourteenth place overall at the 2023 World Athletics Championships in Budapest, Hungary.

In 2024, whilst competing at the Oklahoma Throws Series World Invitational, she met the minimum standard for the Olympics with a new personal best of 64.98 meters. She subsequently competed at the 2024 Summer Olympics in Paris, France in the discus throw, where she threw 60.37 metres and did not qualify for the final.

In September 2025, she competed at the 2025 World Athletics Championships in Tokyo, Japan, without reaching the final.

In August 2026, she competed at the 2026 European Athletics Championships in Birmingham, England, in the discus throw.
