= 2005 European Athletics U23 Championships – Women's discus throw =

The women's discus throw event at the 2005 European Athletics U23 Championships was held in Erfurt, Germany, at Steigerwaldstadion on 16 and 17 July.

== Medalists ==
Gold	Sabine Rumpf; Germany
Silver	Darya Pishchalnikova; Russia
Bronze	Kateryna Karsak; Ukraine

== Results ==
=== Final ===
17 July

Rank	Name	Nationality	Attempts						Result	Notes
Rank	Name	Nationality	1	2	3	4	5	6	Result	Notes
1st place, gold medalist(s)	Sabine Rumpf	Germany	56.27	60.75	57.96	57.95	58.21	59.55	60.75	CR
2nd place, silver medalist(s)	Darya Pishchalnikova	Russia	57.67	57.36	59.45	x	56.73	55.60	59.45	
3rd place, bronze medalist(s)	Kateryna Karsak	Ukraine	50.46	x	56.37	56.81	55.47	x	56.81	
4	Ulrike Giesa	Germany	52.93	55.08	56.18	55.54	55.13	x	56.18	
5	Claire Smithson	Great Britain	54.63	x	x	51.58	x	x	54.63	
6	Zinaida Sendriūtė	Lithuania	x	x	52.78	51.35	45.62	x	52.78	
7	Izabela Koralewska	Poland	52.19	51.13	50.10	x	x	x	52.19	
8	Anna Brel	Belarus	51.96	51.04	x	50.39	49.11	51.60	51.96	
9	Sophie Michel	France	49.64	48.72	48.56				49.64	
10	Nadine Müller	Germany	49.25	47.89	x				49.25	
11	Katalin Máté	Hungary	x	44.93	47.29				47.29	
12	Veronika Watzek	Austria	42.27	x	47.18				47.18	

=== Qualifications ===
16 July
Qualifying 54.00 or 12 best to the Final

==== Group A ====
Rank	Name	Nationality	Result	Notes
1	Sabine Rumpf	Germany	59.12	Q
2	Ulrike Giesa	Germany	57.35	Q
3	Claire Smithson	Great Britain	53.77	q
4	Kateryna Karsak	Ukraine	53.11	q
5	Veronika Watzek	Austria	52.91	q
6	Anna Brel	Belarus	51.79	q
7	Katalin Máté	Hungary	51.63	q
8	Dorothea Kalpakidou	Greece	51.57	
9	Agnieszka Jarmużek	Poland	48.72	

==== Group B ====
Rank	Name	Nationality	Result	Notes
1	Darya Pishchalnikova	Russia	54.52	Q
2	Izabela Koralewska	Poland	54.26	Q
3	Zinaida Sendriūtė	Lithuania	54.09	Q
4	Nadine Müller	Germany	53.37	q
5	Sophie Michel	France	51.69	q
6	Magdalini Komotoglou	Greece	51.00	
7	Alina Roman	Romania	50.16	
8	Valentina Aniballi	Italy	48.87	
9	Żaneta Glanc	Poland	46.24	

== Participation ==
According to an unofficial count, 18 athletes from 13 countries participated in the event.

- Austria (1)
- Belarus (1)
- France (1)
- Germany (3)
- Great Britain (1)
- Greece (2)
- Hungary (1)
- Italy (1)
- Lithuania (1)
- Poland (3)
- Romania (1)
- Russia (1)
- Ukraine (1)
