= Stephanie Brown Trafton =

American discus thrower (born 1979)

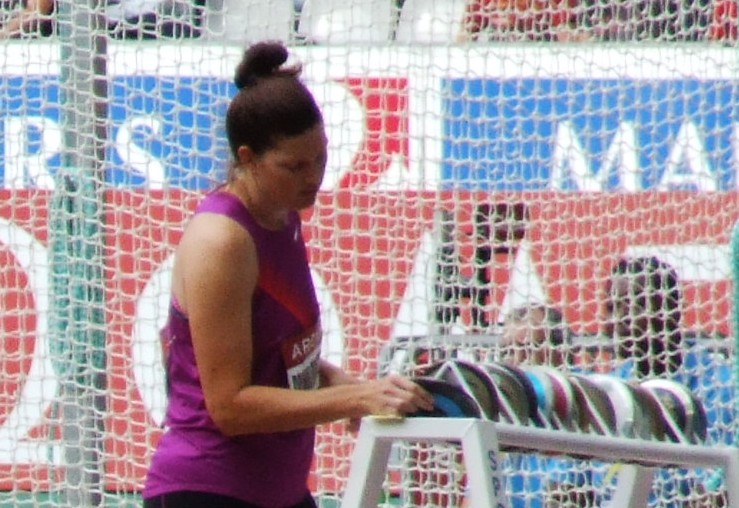
- Brown Trafton competing in the 2010 Diamond League

Personal information
- Born: December 1, 1979 (age 46) San Luis Obispo, California, U.S.
- Home town: Galt, California, U.S.
- Height: 6 ft 4 in (193 cm)
- Weight: 210 lb (95 kg)

Sport
- Country: United States
- Sport: Track and field
- College team: Cal Poly San Luis Obispo
- Club: Nike
Medal record
Women's athletics
Representing United States
Olympic Games
Gold medal – first place	2008 Beijing	Discus throw

Stephanie Brown Trafton, née Stephanie Brown, (born December 1, 1979) is an American track and field athlete who won the discus throwing gold medal at the 2008 Summer Olympics in Beijing. She is thus one of only three American women to have ever won the event.

She was a somewhat unusual athlete in that she had become a two-time Olympian before she had competed at a World Championships in Athletics. Her first World Championships in 2009 ended with a sub-par performance in the discus final, but in 2011, she placed sixth. In 2012, she secured her third trip to the Olympics, after a definitive performance at that year's American Olympic trials. Still, the best-performing American of 2012 finished off the medals podium in London in seventh place.

== Pre-Olympic career ==
Brown Trafton has said she was inspired to become an Olympian as a 4-year-old watching Mary Lou Retton perform in the 1984 Summer Olympics. After a youth of attempting several different sports, she eventually divided her time between athletics and basketball. She competed in the discus and shot put at Arroyo Grande High School, and was the CIF California State Meet high school champion in shot put in 1996. After placing second in 1997, she recaptured the California shot put title in 1998. At the same meet, she added the California discus title to her resume. As of 2008, her 181.25-foot (55.25 m) throw to secure victory remains one of the 10 best American high school discus throws in history.

Nevertheless, she seemed to be headed towards a career in basketball, after being awarded a scholarship for both basketball and track and field to Cal Poly San Luis Obispo. Her career was ended in that sport prematurely by a torn anterior cruciate ligament. Thereafter, she concentrated on track and field. She competed at the collegiate level in shot put and discus from 1999 to 2003, but missed 2000, while recovering from the knee injury.

Brown Trafton was named as an NCAA All-American six times in her college career, two times during the indoor season as a shot putter and four times in the outdoor season for discus and shot put. Her highest finishes at the NCAA Division I national championships were second in discus in 2003 and fourth in shot put in 2003.

== 2004 Olympics ==
Brown Trafton competed in the 2004 Olympic Trials in Sacramento, California in both the shot put and the discus throw. Her best throw coming into the discus competition was 192 feet. In the first throw of the discus final, she threw a 9-foot personal best of 201 feet 3 inches, surpassing the international A-standard mark, and qualified for her first Olympic team.

In August 2004, Brown Trafton competed at the Athens Games, and her best mark in the qualifying round failed to advance her to the finals. She placed 22nd with a throw of 192 feet even (58.54 m), under her 203 feet 1 inch (61.90 m) personal best at the time. She has expressed contentment with her performance there, saying, "2004 gave me an awesome experience. I came to the Olympics just out of college."

== The 2008 season ==
In the run-up to the Beijing Olympics, Brown Trafton made what observers called "stunning improvement". She began 2008 with a personal best that was unchanged from 2004. However, she improved that mark in March, April and May 2008. Coming into the Beijing Olympics, her personal best was 217 feet 1 inch (66.17 m), achieved at the Hartnell Throwers Meet in Salinas, California.

Before this year I never really dreamed I could throw over 210 [feet]. Now, I want to hit at least 64 meters every time

— Brown Trafton in May 2008

Until a June 21, 2008 mark of 218 feet 1 inch (66.47 m) by Romanian Nicoleta Grasu, this throw stood as the longest on record anywhere in the world in 2008. Moreover, it was the third-best American throw of all time, behind efforts by Suzy Powell and Becky Breisch.

Prior to Beijing, she had placed third at the U.S. trials with a throw of 205 feet 5 inches (62.61 m).

Asked to explain her dramatic improvement, Brown Trafton pointed to a key difference in her training regimen. Unusually for her, she did not take time off between the 2007 and 2008 seasons. Instead, she spent what would have normally been the season hiatus working on the "supplemental training" of "balance, agility and flexibility" with Tony Mikia, a physical therapist/sports performance trainer at Sacramento-based Kime Human Performance Institute.

== 2008 Olympics ==
=== Performance ===
Although called by the mainstream American sports press "an unlikely savior of U.S. pride" and a "field filler more than a medal contender", a radically improved Brown Trafton actually came to Beijing with a reasonable possibility of winning. She had executed the second-best throw posted in the sport in 2008. And she had progressively upped her personal best by over 4 m across several meets during the 2008 season.

I came to the Bird's Nest to lay a golden egg, and that's what I did.

— Her immediate reaction to victory

The first of her six throws displayed her progress to her competitors in Beijing. At 212 feet 5 inches (64.74 m), it bettered the field by almost two meters. She threw into the net on her second and third throws, then posted a 191 feet 7 inches (58.39) and a 201 feet 1 inch (61.30). By the sixth round, it was unnecessary for her to throw to win the gold medal, as the two remaining competitors had not bettered her initial mark. In the end, no one got within a meter of her first throw.

=== An American breakthrough ===
On a personal level, her victory in Beijing was the culmination of a number of months of steady improvement for the athlete, after years of steady progress but nonetheless inconsistent throws above the 60 m mark. It was also the United States' first track and field gold medal of the 2008 Olympics, after a few initial days of failure. Brown Trafton's gold medal in Beijing was more broadly notable for being the first American gold in the event for 76 years.

I want to meet Mary Lou Retton. Please, somebody hook me up. I have to meet Mary Lou. She was my idol. I had a leotard just like hers.

— request after winning gold

It was only the second American medal in women's discus at a fully attended Olympiad, along with Lillian Copeland's silver medal at the 1928 Games in Amsterdam.

It was the second American gold in the event, after Copeland's gold at the Depression-handicapped 1932 Summer Olympics. It was the fourth medal in American history, behind Leslie Deniz' silver won at the politically boycotted 1984 Summer Olympics. Additionally, it was the first American medal in the sport won outside the city of Los Angeles since Copeland's silver medal in Amsterdam.

=== Global perspective ===
Despite the significance of the victory to the US Track and Field program, Brown Trafton's winning distance of 212 feet 5 inches (64.74 m) caused one track and field reporter to label Beijing a "low-standard competition". It wasn't a personal best for the athlete. Nor was it an Olympic record, as Copeland's gold had been in 1932. It failed to approach Gabriele Reinsch's 1988 world record of 251 feet 11 inches (76.78 m). In fact, not only was Leslie Deniz' 24-year-old silver medal-winning throw longer than any throw of the 2008 Olympics, but no gold medalist since Lia Manoliu in the 1968 games had posted a shorter winning distance. Only 2 of the 12 finalists at the Beijing Olympics had a personal best under Brown Trafton's winning throw, and the average personal best of the field was 219 feet even (66.75 m). However, she was peaking when most of the field was in personal decline. When viewed against the prism of 2008-only performances, the only members of the field other than Brown Trafton to better the winning 212 feet 5 inches (64.74 m) mark were Aretha Thurmond, Nicoleta Grasu and Yarelis Barrios. In fact, only six women other than Brown Trafton had thrown better in 2008, and they were not all present in Beijing.

I know that by far this meet was not in the top five this year as far as competitiveness.

— on the quality of the meet

Matters were not helped, as one commentator noted, by the Beijing weather. The windless, humid conditions on the evening of the competition were hardly ideal for discus throwing. Perhaps, as Brown Trafton herself remarked, the competition was "a little more open" thanks to the banning of the prohibitive favorite, Russian Darya Pishchalnikova, for suspicion of doping.

=== Personal life ===
Unlike many 21st-century American Olympians, Brown Trafton had a day job as she prepared for the Beijing Games. Using skills rooted in her undergraduate degree from Cal Poly San Luis Obispo, she is the Director of Operations for Track & Field and Cross Country sports at California State University, Sacramento, and she worked as a computer-assisted designer for an environmental consulting firm in Sacramento, California called Sycamore Environmental Consultants, Inc.

Upon returning to her residence in Galt, California after her gold medal performance, Brown Trafton was presented with the key to the City of Galt by Mayor Andrew Meredith.

She and her husband are both recreational hunters. She quipped to reporters that the downside of the Beijing Olympics was that they occurred just as hunting season opened in California.

In 2008 she won the Jesse Owens Award, USATF's highest award to the Athlete of the Year.

== 2012 Olympics ==
Brown Trafton confirmed her intention to compete in the 2012 Summer Olympics immediately after winning in Beijing. Noting the difficulties her sport has had with doping, she set a personal goal for the future of being "the first world-record holder that's a clean world record".

The following season, she won her first national title in the discus, and as a result she qualified for the 2009 World Championships in Athletics where she qualified for the finals but finished in last place in the finals with her lone legal throw.

In 2011, she repeated her national championship which again qualified her for the 2011 World Championships in Athletics. Again making the final, she finished 5th overall.

Of course I’m thrilled about the record, but I’ve been Athlete of the Year before, but never Athlete of the Week.

Her 2012 season showed continued improvement in an Olympic year. On May 4, she beat Suzy Powell-Roos's American record by 3 inches, throwing 67.74 metres (222 feet 3 inches) at the Altius TC Throwdown in Maui, Hawaii (the same place where Powell-Roos had set the previous record). That week she was named the USATF Athlete of the Week for the first time.

At the 2012 United States Olympic Trials, the preliminary round was held in rainy conditions that were difficult for all competitors. Brown Trafton fell twice in the ring, her final attempt finally assuring her a spot in the finals, though her off-balance second attempt was measured and proved to be sufficient. Under better conditions in the final, she easily outdistanced the field, leading from the first attempt and ultimately throwing almost 3 meters past second place Aretha Thurmond's best throw.

At the 2012 Olympics themselves, she originally finished in eighth place, but she officially moved into seventh when the original silver medalist, Darya Pishchalnikova, was disqualified for doping. Her longest throw in London was 63.01, well back from Sandra Perković's winning 69.11.

== See also ==
- Sycamore Environmental Consultants, Inc.
- Results Physical Therapy and Sports Performance
