= Pishchalnikov =

Pishchalnikov (m., Russian: Пищальников) or Pishchalnikova (f., Russian: Пищальникова) is a Russian surname. Notable people with the surname include:

- Bogdan Pishchalnikov (born 1982), Russian discus thrower
- Darya Pishchalnikova (born 1985), Russian discus thrower
- Kirill Pishchalnikov (born 1987), Russian basketball player
