= Athletics at the 2007 Summer Universiade – Women's discus throw =

The women's discus throw event at the 2007 Summer Universiade was held on 12 August.

== Results ==
Rank	Athlete	Nationality	#1	#2	#3	#4	#5	$6	Result	Notes
1st place, gold medalist(s)	Yarelys Barrios	Cuba	59.34	61.36	61.26	59.83	x	x	61.36	
2nd place, silver medalist(s)	Dani Samuels	Australia	60.47	x	x	x	56.87	x	60.47	
3rd place, bronze medalist(s)	Dragana Tomašević	Serbia	54.83	56.82	53.70	56.63	55.33	53.39	56.82	
4	Vera Begić	Croatia	52.21	x	x	55.26	53.24	x	55.26	
5	Tanja Mäkinen	Finland	51.62	x	54.14	53.58	51.86	54.12	54.14	
6	Valentina Aniballi	Italy	x	49.48	52.49	x	x	52.48	52.49	
7	Sivan Jean	Israel	44.13	50.42	x	51.69	x	x	51.69	
8	Olga Olshevskaya	Russia	x	51.30	49.90	50.82	51.31	49.63	51.31	
9	Hanna Mazgunova	Belarus	x	50.13	x				50.13	
10	Svetlana Ivanova	Russia	49.59	x	x				49.59	
11	Dorothea Kalpakidou	Greece	46.31	x	x				46.31	
12	Dwi Ratnawati	Indonesia	44.02	43.69	x				44.02	
13	Anu Teesaar	Estonia	33.54	x	43.16				43.16	
14	Monica Joon	India	41.03	39.90	40.77				41.03	
15	Siwaporn Warapiang	Thailand	x	40.83	40.18				40.83	
	Volha Charnahorava	Belarus	x	–	–				DNF	
	Simoné du Toit	South Africa							DNS	
