= Dani Stevens =

Australian discus thrower

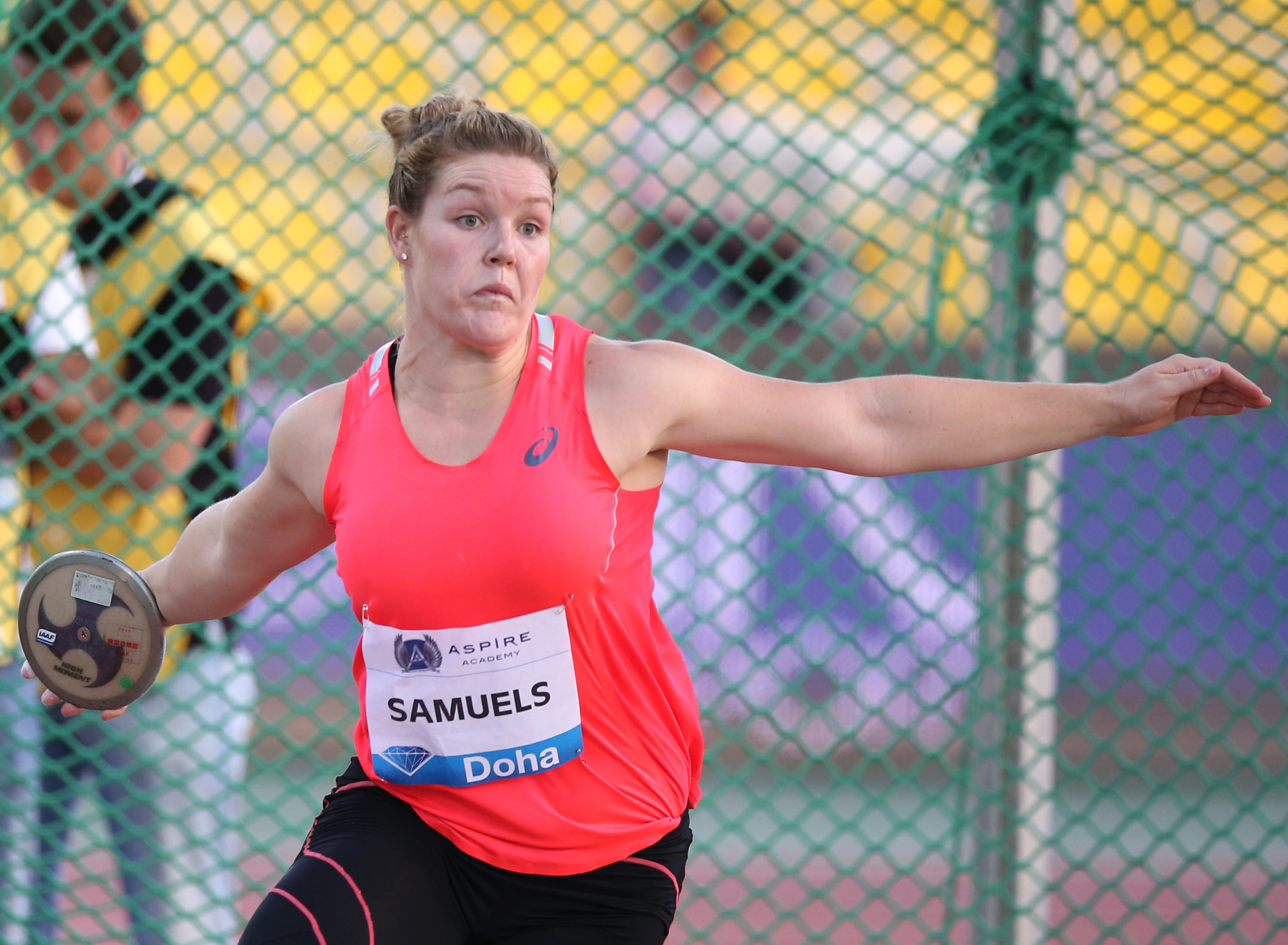
- Stevens in 2015

Personal information
- Born: 26 May 1988 (age 38) Fairfield, New South Wales, Australia
- Height: 1.83 m (6 ft 0 in)

Sport
- Country: Australia
- Sport: Athletics
- Event: Discus throw
- Club: Westfields Athletics Club
- Turned pro: 2003
- Retired: 2021
Medal record
World Championships
Gold medal – first place	2009 Berlin	Discus throw
Silver medal – second place	2017 London	Discus throw
Commonwealth Games
Gold medal – first place	2014 Glasgow	Discus throw
Gold medal – first place	2018 Gold Coast	Discus throw
Bronze medal – third place	2006 Melbourne	Discus throw
Universiade
Gold medal – first place	2009 Belgrade	Discus throw
Silver medal – second place	2007 Bangkok	Discus throw
World Junior Championships
Gold medal – first place	2006 Beijing	Discus throw
World Youth Championships
Gold medal – first place	2005 Marrakesh	Discus throw
Bronze medal – third place	2005 Marrakesh	Shot Put

Dani Stevens (née Samuels, born 26 May 1988) is an Australian retired discus thrower who in 2009 became the youngest ever female world champion in the event. She is the current national and Oceanian record holder.

After winning the discus gold and shot put bronze medals at the 2005 World Youth Championships in Athletics, she went on to win the bronze medal in the discus at the 2006 Commonwealth Games in Melbourne at the age of seventeen. She won the discus silver at the 2007 Summer Universiade and represented Australia at her first World Championships in Athletics soon after. She reached the final of the 2008 Beijing Olympics and improved significantly the following year to win the gold medal at the 2009 World Championships in Athletics.

Samuels is one of only eleven athletes (along with Valerie Adams, Usain Bolt, Veronica Campbell-Brown, Armand Duplantis, Jacques Freitag, Yelena Isinbayeva, Kirani James, Faith Kipyegon, Jana Pittman, and David Storl) to win World Championship titles at the youth, junior, and senior levels of an athletic event. Her personal best throws are 69.64 m for the discus and 17.05 metres in the shot put.

Samuels has also spent many winters playing basketball in the Waratah League alongside her sister, Jamie, who has played in the Women's National Basketball League.

== Career ==
Samuels was born in 1988 to mother Tracy Samuels and father Mark Samuels. She is the second eldest of 4 children and the family grew up in Merrylands, a suburb of Sydney and started athletics at Greystanes Little Athletics club.

Samuels first attended Merrylands Public School, then moved onto Westfields Sports High School as a basketballer before changing to train with her coach Denis Knowles in the Westfields athletic program.

Her first global appearance came in the shot put at the 2003 World Youth Championships at the age of fifteen, at which she finished 13th in the qualifying rounds. She returned to the competition two years later (2005), winning the bronze medal in the shot put (with a new personal best throw of 15.53 m), and the gold medal in the discus. Samuels also took part in the 2005 Australian Youth Olympic Festival, winning the shot put and taking second place in the discus throw.

The following year (2006) Dani opened her season with an appearance at the 2006 Commonwealth Games – her first major senior championship. She reached the shot put final, finishing twelfth overall, but again it was in the discus where she excelled, winning the bronze medal at the age of seventeen. She threw a discus personal best of 60.63 m to win the 2006 World Junior Championships and was seventh overall in the shot put. Following this, she opted to focus solely on the discus throw at major tournaments. She closed the year with a sixth-place performance at the 2006 IAAF World Cup, representing Oceania.

Samuels became the joint Australian champion in the shot put with 'Ana Po'uhila at the start of 2007 and also won her first national title in the discus. She threw a near personal best of 60.47 m to take the silver medal behind Yarelis Barrios at the 2007 Summer Universiade. A few weeks later Dani took part in her first ever World Championships in Athletics, just missing out on qualifying for the final round of the women's discus competition as the best performing non-qualifier.

In 2008, she won her second discus national title and improved her best to 62.95 m in Brisbane. She reached the Olympic final in the discus at the 2008 Beijing Games, throwing 60.15 m for ninth place. Competing at the 2009 Summer Universiade, she became the Universiade champion, beating Żaneta Glanc to the gold medal by a margin of nearly two metres.

She achieved a then personal best throw throwing 65.44 metres to win the 2009 World Championships in Berlin. Samuels took part in the final edition of the IAAF World Athletics Final, but she was past her season's peak form taking fifth place with a sub-60 metre throw. She started strongly the following year, opening her season with a personal best of 65.84 m to win at the Sydney Track Classic in February. She gave a consistent series of throws at the 2010 Australian Championships winning a sixth consecutive national title with a best throw of 63.31 m.

Later in 2010 Samuels withdrew from the Australian team for the 2010 Commonwealth Games citing concerns over “health and security in Delhi”.

Dani came 10th at the 2011 World Athletics Championships, 12th at the 2012 Summer Olympics., and 10th again at the 2013 Worlds.

She won the gold at the 2014 Commonwealth Games with a throw of 64.88 m.

At the 2016 Summer Olympics, she finished 4th, 44 cm behind Denia Caballero in bronze. The following year she threw a new personal best to claim silver at the London World Championships. She won the women's discus event at the 2018 Commonwealth Games in Brisbane.

Stevens qualified for the 2020 Tokyo Olympics and, after a serious neck injury sustained in training, which required spinal surgery and affected her throwing arm, she recovered to compete, throwing 58.77m, not sufficient to qualify her for the final.

On 24 October 2021, Stevens announced her retirement from competing in Athletics.

== Personal bests ==
Event	Best (m)	Venue	Date
Discus throw	69.64	London, United Kingdom	13 August 2017
Shot put	17.05	Sydney, Australia	2 March 2014

- All information taken from IAAF profile.

== Achievements ==
Year	Competition	Venue	Position	Event	Notes
Representing Australia
2005	World Youth Championships	Marrakesh, Morocco	3rd	Shot put	15.53 m
2005	World Youth Championships	Marrakesh, Morocco	1st	Discus	54.09 m
2006	Commonwealth Games	Melbourne, Australia	12th	Shot put	14.91 m
2006	Commonwealth Games	Melbourne, Australia	3rd	Discus	59.44 m
2006	World Junior Championships	Beijing, China	7th	Shot put	15.71 m
2006	World Junior Championships	Beijing, China	1st	Discus	60.63 m
2006	World Cup	Athens, Greece	6th	Discus	59.68 m
2007	Universiade	Bangkok, Thailand	2nd	Discus	60.47 m
2007	World Championships	Osaka, Japan	13th	Discus	60.44 m
2008	Olympic Games	Beijing, China	9th	Discus	60.15 m
2009	Universiade	Belgrade, Serbia	1st	Discus	62.48 m
2009	World Championships	Berlin, Germany	1st	Discus	65.44 m
2011	World Championships	Daegu, South Korea	10th	Discus	59.14 m
2012	Olympic Games	London, United Kingdom	12th	Discus	60.40 m
2013	World Championships	Moscow, Russia	10th	Discus	62.42 m
2014	Commonwealth Games	Glasgow, United Kingdom	1st	Discus	64.88 m
2015	World Championships	Beijing, China	6th	Discus	63.14 m
2016	Olympic Games	Rio de Janeiro, Brazil	4th	Discus	64.90 m
2017	World Championships	London, United Kingdom	2nd	Discus	69.64 m
2018	Commonwealth Games	Gold Coast, Australia	1st	Discus	68.26 m
2021	Olympic Games	Tokyo, Japan	22nd (q)	Discus	58.77 m
