= Becky Breisch =

American discus thrower (b. 1983)

Becky Breisch (born March 16, 1983) is an American track and field athlete who competes in the discus throw. She has represented the United States in the event at three consecutive World Championships in Athletics from 2005 to 2009. Her personal best throw of 67.37 meters for the discus makes her the sixth best American of all-time in the event.

A two-time USA Outdoor champion as a professional, she also claimed NCAA titles in the discus and shot put while at the University of Nebraska–Lincoln.

== Career ==
=== Early life and college ===
Born in Edwardsburg, Michigan, she attended Edwardsburg High School before going on to college at the University of Nebraska–Lincoln. While majoring in community health, she competed for the Nebraska Cornhuskers women's track and field team in the shot put and discus throw. In 2002, she won discus at the Big 12 Conference in her first year and was the runner-up in the event at the NCAA Women's Outdoor Track and Field Championship later that summer. In her sophomore year at Nebraska she won both the indoor and outdoor Big 12 shot put titles, the Big 12 discus title, and then went on to claim her first outdoor NCAA title in the shot put.

The 2004 season brought her further success: she won both the shot put and weight throw events at the Big 12 Indoor Championships and placed second in the shot at the NCAA Indoors. Turning to the outdoor season, she repeated as the Big 12 shot champion and won the discus at the NCAA Outdoors. She narrowly missed out on a place at the 2004 Athens Olympics, as she finished fourth at that year's United States Olympic Trials. An elbow injury meant that she missed the majority of the college athletics season in her last year at Nebraska. In her time at Nebraska she earned NCAA All-American honours on eight occasions.

=== Professional ===
She threw a personal best in the discus in Lincoln, Nebraska in May 2005, launching the implement 63.53 meters (208 ft 5 in). That throw ranked her as the second best American thrower of the season behind Aretha Thurmond. She won the discus at the Drake Relays and then took her first national discus title at the USA Outdoor Track and Field Championships, earning herself a place for the world championships. At the 2005 World Championships in Athletics her best throw of 57.16 m in the qualifiers was not enough to progress to the final.

She set a personal record throw of 67.37 m (221 ft 0 in) in Maui, Hawaii in April 2007, a mark which elevated her to second on the all-time American lists behind Suzy Powell (who had thrown 67.67 m (222 ft 0 in) in Hawaii just two days earlier). She won the discus at the Reebok Grand Prix and was runner-up at the USA Outdoor Nationals. On her second global appearance at the 2007 World Championships in Athletics in Osaka she was again knocked out in the qualifying round. As one of the best performers on the circuit, she was invited to the 2007 IAAF World Athletics Final, where she finished in fourth place.

A fourth-place finish at the 2008 Olympic Trials meant she again narrowly missed out on an opportunity to perform on the Olympic stage. At the 2008 IAAF World Athletics Final, she managed only seventh position. She fared better at the 2009 USA Outdoor Track and Field Championships, where her throw of 62.08 m (203 ft 8 in) brought her the bronze medal and another place on the American world team. For a third consecutive time, she was knocked out in the qualifying round, taking eleventh place in the group stage of the 2009 World Championships.

Breisch claimed her second national title in the discus at the 2010 USA Outdoor Track and Field Championships, defeating Olympic champion Stephanie Brown Trafton among others. She was one of two athletes to be selected to represent the Americas at the 2010 IAAF Continental Cup (the other being Cuban Yarelis Barrios) and she finished fifth with a best mark of 60.70 m (199 ft 2 in).

== Major competition record ==
Year	Competition	Venue	Position	Event	Notes
Representing the United States
2004	NACAC U-23 Championships	Sherbrooke, Canada	1st	Discus	53.26 m
2005	World Championships	Helsinki, Finland	10th (qualifying)	Discus throw	57.16 m
2007	World Championships	Osaka, Japan	11th (qualifying)	Discus throw	58.42 m
2007	World Athletics Final	Stuttgart, Germany	4th	Discus throw	60.26 m
2008	World Athletics Final	Stuttgart, Germany	7th	Discus throw	53.92 m
2009	World Championships	Berlin, Germany	11th (qualifying)	Discus throw	58.50 m
2010	Continental Cup	Split, Croatia	5th	Discus throw	60.70 m
