= Svetlana Saykina =

Russian discus thrower

Personal information
- Born: Svetlana Ivanova; 10 July 1985 (age 40) Kostroma, Russia
- Height: 1.82 m (5 ft 11 1/2 in)
- Weight: 90 kg (198 lb)

Sport
- Country: Russia
- Sport: Athletics
- Event: Discus
- Updated on 14 August 2012

Svetlana Vladimirovna Saykina (Russian: Светлана Владимировна Сайкина; née Ivanova born 10 July 1985) is a Russian discus thrower.

== International competitions ==
Representing Russia
Year	Competition	Venue	Position	Result	Notes
2004	World Junior Championships	Grosseto, Italy	5th	51.86 m	
2005	Universiade	İzmir, Turkey	15th (q)	48.46 m	
2007	European U23 Championships	Debrecen, Hungary	3rd	56.92 m	
2007	Universiade	Bangkok, Thailand	10th	49.59 m	
2008	Olympic Games	Beijing, China	16th (q)	59.48 m	
2009	World Championships	Berlin, Germany	20th (q)	59.31 m	
2010	European Championships	Barcelona, Spain	10th	56.09 m	
2011	Universiade	Shenzhen, China	3rd	60.81 m	
2012	Olympic Games	London, United Kingdom	17th (q)	60.67 m	
2013	World Championships	Moscow, Russia	20th (q)	56.62 m	
