= 2007 European Athletics U23 Championships – Women's discus throw =

The women's discus throw event at the 2007 European Athletics U23 Championships was held in Debrecen, Hungary, at Gyulai István Atlétikai Stadion on 12 and 13 July.

== Medalists ==
Gold	Kateryna Karsak; Ukraine
Silver	Veronika Watzek; Austria
Bronze	Svetlana Ivanova; Russia

== Results ==
=== Final ===
13 July

Rank	Name	Nationality	Attempts						Result	Notes
Rank	Name	Nationality	1	2	3	4	5	6	Result	Notes
1st place, gold medalist(s)	Kateryna Karsak	Ukraine	60.30	62.79	57.09	60.96	64.40	62.29	64.40	CR
2nd place, silver medalist(s)	Veronika Watzek	Austria	43.40	x	54.84	x	57.15	52.74	57.15	
3rd place, bronze medalist(s)	Svetlana Ivanova	Russia	54.88	x	x	54.89	56.92	x	56.92	
4	Hanna Mazgunova	Belarus	52.66	52.94	54.63	x	x	54.16	54.63	
5	Katarzyna Jaworowska	Poland	51.57	x	52.65	51.65	x	53.89	53.89	
6	Jessica Kolotzei	Germany	47.56	51.25	53.34	40.40	51.71	50.34	53.34	
7	Liliana Cá	Portugal	51.43	51.18	x	x	x	x	51.43	
8	Nadine Müller	Germany	x	x	51.04				51.04	
9	Izabela Koralewska	Poland	48.19	50.69	x				50.69	
10	Magdalini Komotoglou	Greece	49.16	x	49.72				49.72	
11	Sivan Jean	Israel	x	47.65	48.56				48.56	
	Darya Pishchalnikova	Russia	60.95	61.58	63.29	61.25	64.15	62.45	DQ	IAAF Rule 32.2.b and 32.2.e Doping

^{†}: Darya Pishchalnikova ranked initially 2nd (64.15m), but was disqualified later for infringement of IAAF doping rules.

=== Qualifications ===
12 July
Qualifying 54.00 or 12 best to the Final

==== Group A ====
Rank	Name	Nationality	Result	Notes
1	Nadine Müller	Germany	58.33	Q
2	Sivan Jean	Israel	53.97	q
3	Izabela Koralewska	Poland	51.95	q
4	Liliana Cá	Portugal	50.61	q
5	Kateryna Shyshkina	Ukraine	50.18	
6	Sanna Kämäräinen	Finland	50.04	
7	Heike Koderisch	Germany	49.99	
8	Sabina Asenjo	Spain	49.29	
9	Maryna Yakimava	Belarus	47.88	
	Darya Pishchalnikova	Russia	DQ	Q^{†} Doping

^{†}: Darya Pishchalnikova initially reached the final (57.43m), but was disqualified later for infringement of IAAF doping rules.

==== Group B ====
Rank	Name	Nationality	Result	Notes
1	Kateryna Karsak	Ukraine	59.89	Q
2	Veronika Watzek	Austria	57.14	Q
3	Svetlana Ivanova	Russia	53.94	q
4	Magdalini Komotoglou	Greece	53.01	q
5	Hanna Mazgunova	Belarus	52.25	q
6	Katarzyna Jaworowska	Poland	50.92	q
7	Jessica Kolotzei	Germany	50.79	q
8	Lucie Vaníčková	Czech Republic	47.39	
9	Sophie Michel	France	47.09	
10	Kirsty Law	Great Britain	46.04	
11	Zacharoula Georgiadou	Cyprus	44.49	

== Participation ==
According to an unofficial count, 21 athletes from 15 countries participated in the event.

- Austria (1)
- Belarus (2)
- Cyprus (1)
- Czech Republic (1)
- Finland (1)
- France (1)
- Germany (3)
- Great Britain (1)
- Greece (1)
- Israel (1)
- Poland (2)
- Portugal (1)
- Russia (2)
- Spain (1)
- Ukraine (2)
