= Athletics at the 2012 Summer Olympics – Women's discus throw =

Women's discus throw at the Games of the XXX Olympiad
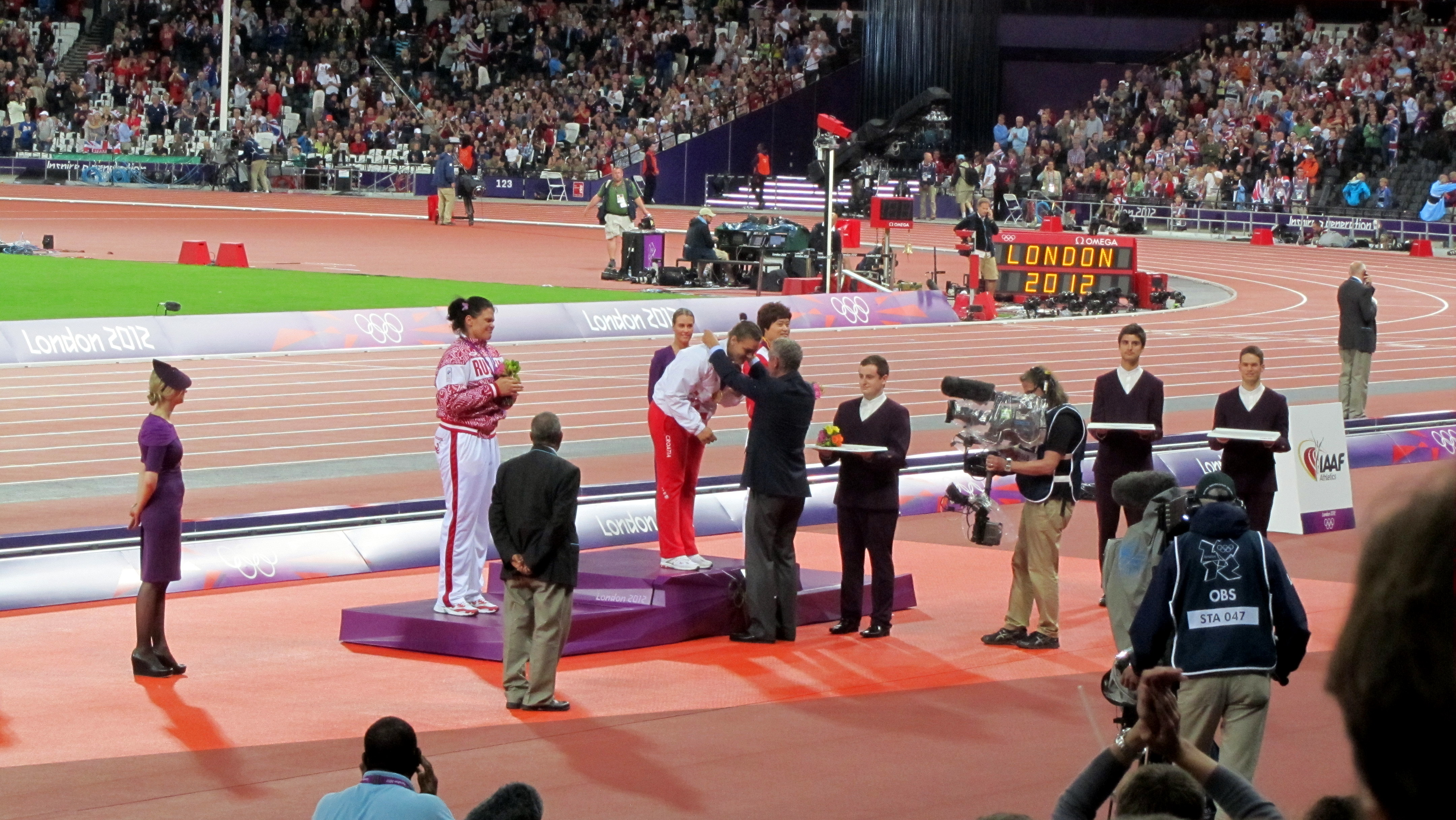
- Women's discus throw victory ceremony — Darya Pishchalnikova was consequently stripped her medal due to doping
- Venue: Olympic Stadium
- Date: 3–4 August
- Competitors: 36 from 23 nations
- Winning distance: 69.11

Medalists
1st place, gold medalist(s)		Sandra Perković	Croatia
2nd place, silver medalist(s)		Li Yanfeng	China
3rd place, bronze medalist(s)		Yarelys Barrios	Cuba

The women's discus throw competition at the 2012 Summer Olympics in London, United Kingdom was held at the Olympic Stadium on 3–4 August. Each athlete received three throws in the qualifying round. All who achieved the qualifying distance progressed to the final. If less than twelve athletes were to achieve this mark, then the twelve furthest throwing athletes would reach the final. Each finalist is allowed three throws in last round, with the top eight athletes after that point being given three further attempts.

Eight automatic qualifiers were achieved in the qualifying round, all but one exceeding the minimum by half a meter. Darya Pishchalnikova, Nadine Müller and Sandra Perković made it in their first attempt, while Yarelys Barrios hit the top qualifier 65.94 in her second throw after fouling the first. It took 62.47 to make the final.

In the final, Nadine Müller took the lead in the first round, while defending champion Stephanie Brown Trafton, who surprised everyone with her first round throw four years earlier, only managed the fifth best throw of the first round this time, and that turned out to be her best effort. In the second round, Li Yanfeng took the lead with 67.22. Previous silver medalist Yarelys Barrios followed with the second best throw of the competition 66.38. These positions lasted only until Sandra Perković threw 68.11 to assume the lead she would not relinquish. Her third round throw was a Croatian national record 69.11, solidifying her hold on the gold medal. Taking no follow through, she stood in the ring talking to the discus throughout its flight. In the fourth round, Darya Pishchalnikova edged into the bronze medal position with 66.42, then in the fifth round secured the silver medal with 67.56.

It was later announced that Pishchalnikova tested positive for the anabolic steroid oxandrolone in the samples taken in May 2012. In April 2013 she was banned by the Russian Athletics Federation for ten years, and her results from May 2012 were annulled, meaning she was set on track to lose her Olympic medal.

== Schedule ==
All times are British Summer Time (UTC+1)

Date	Time	Round
Friday, 3 August 2012	19:10	Qualifications
Saturday, 4 August 2012	19:30	Finals

== Records ==
Prior to the competition, the existing World and Olympic records were as follows.

World record	Gabriele Reinsch (GDR)	76.80 m	Neubrandenburg, East Germany	9 July 1988
Olympic record	Martina Hellmann (GDR)	72.30 m	Seoul, South Korea	29 September 1988
2012 World leading	Darya Pishchalnikova (RUS)	70.69 m	Cheboksary, Russia	7 July 2012

== Qualifying round ==
- Entrants as of 27 July 2012.

Qual. rule: qualification standard 63.00 m (Q) or at least best 12 qualified (q).

Rank	Group	Name	Nationality	#1	#2	#3	Result	Notes
1	A	Yarelys Barrios	Cuba	x	65.94	–	65.94	Q
2	B	Nadine Müller	Germany	65.89	–	–	65.89	Q
3	B	Sandra Perković	Croatia	65.74	–	–	65.74	Q
4	A	Darya Pishchalnikova	Russia	65.02	–	–	65.02	Q
5	B	Stephanie Brown Trafton	United States	x	61.09	64.89	64.89	Q
6	A	Li Yanfeng	China	59.69	64.48	–	64.48	Q
7	A	Dani Samuels	Australia	60.02	x	63.97	63.97	Q, SB
8	A	Krishna Poonia	India	x	63.54	–	63.54	Q
9	B	Anna Rüh	Germany	62.98	x	59.71	62.98	q
10	B	Zinaida Sendriūtė	Lithuania	61.71	x	62.79	62.79	q
11	A	Ma Xuejun	China	62.66	60.49	62.18	62.66	q
12	A	Mélina Robert-Michon	France	x	62.47	59.72	62.47	q
13	B	Seema Antil	India	x	61.10	61.99	61.99	
14	B	Nicoleta Grasu	Romania	61.86	59.59	x	61.86	SB
15	B	Gia Lewis-Smallwood	United States	x	61.44	61.25	61.44	
16	B	Andressa de Morais	Brazil	x	x	60.94	60.94	SB
17	B	Svetlana Saykina	Russia	59.76	60.67	x	60.67	
18	A	Natalya Fokina-Semenova	Ukraine	58.37	60.61	60.36	60.61	
19	B	Dragana Tomašević	Serbia	59.32	60.53	57.68	60.53	
20	A	Julia Fischer	Germany	x	58.82	60.23	60.23	
21	B	Karen Gallardo	Chile	58.82	60.09	x	60.09	
22	A	Li Wen-Hua	Chinese Taipei	58.22	59.91	58.99	59.91	
23	A	Żaneta Glanc	Poland	56.40	59.88	56.77	59.88	
24	A	Aretha Thurmond	United States	58.38	59.39	57.81	59.39	
25	A	Rocío Comba	Argentina	55.22	55.81	58.98	58.98	
26	B	Denia Caballero	Cuba	57.47	x	58.78	58.78	
27	B	Kateryna Karsak	Ukraine	x	x	58.64	58.64	
28	A	Allison Randall	Jamaica	57.16	58.06	x	58.06	
29	A	Yaime Pérez	Cuba	57.46	x	57.87	57.87	
30	B	Monique Jansen	Netherlands	55.65	57.50	56.04	57.50	
31	B	Irina Rodrigues	Portugal	57.23	x	55.58	57.23	
32	B	Sviatlana Siarova	Belarus	56.70	55.99	x	56.70	
33	A	Věra Pospíšilová-Cechlová	Czech Republic	55.00	x	x	55.00	
–	B	Tan Jian	China	x	x	x	NM	
DSQ	A	Vera Karmishina-Ganeeva	Russia	~~59.90~~	~~49.53~~	~~x~~	~~59.90~~	Doping

== Final ==
Official Video

- Entrants as of 3 August 2012.

Rank	Name	Nationality	#1	#2	#3	#4	#5	#6	Result	Notes
1st place, gold medalist(s)	Sandra Perković	Croatia	64.58	68.11	69.11	x	66.96	64.03	69.11	NR
2nd place, silver medalist(s)	Li Yanfeng	China	x	67.22	x	x	63.64	x	67.22	
3rd place, bronze medalist(s)	Yarelys Barrios	Cuba	63.97	66.38	64.84	64.06	x	65.21	66.38	
4	Nadine Müller	Germany	65.71	65.06	x	64.16	64.35	65.94	65.94	
5	Mélina Robert-Michon	France	62.23	61.70	62.41	62.66	63.62	63.98	63.98	SB
6	Krishna Poonia	India	62.42	x	61.61	x	63.62	61.31	63.62	
7	Stephanie Brown Trafton	United States	63.01	x	59.30	x	x	61.89	63.01	
8	Zinaida Sendriūtė	Lithuania	61.68	x	x				61.68	
9	Anna Rüh	Germany	59.95	x	61.36				61.36	
10	Ma Xuejun	China	61.02	x	60.72				61.02	
11	Dani Samuels	Australia	60.40	59.86	57.87				60.40	
—N/a	Darya Pishchalnikova	Russia	~~65.19~~	~~62.07~~	~~65.06~~	~~66.42~~	~~67.56~~	~~59.13~~	~~67.56~~	DQ

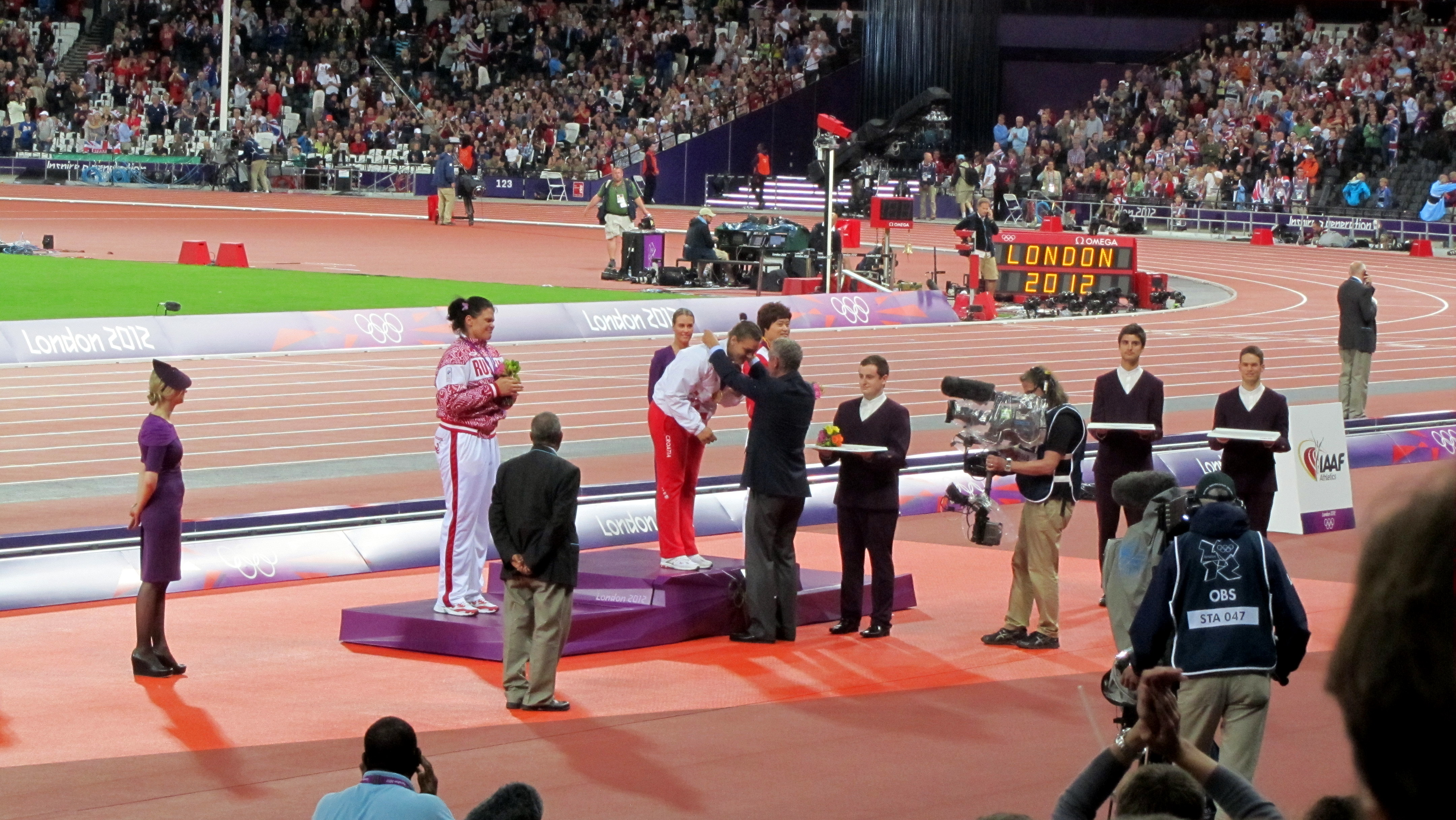
Medal ceremony

- Darya Pishchalnikova, who had been originally awarded the silver medal, had been tested positive for the anabolic steroid oxandrolone and her medal and record were revoked.
