= Athletics at the 2009 Summer Universiade – Women's discus throw =

The women's discus throw event at the 2009 Summer Universiade was held on 7–8 July.

== Medalists ==
Gold	Silver	Bronze
Dani Samuels; Australia	Żaneta Glanc; Poland	Kateryna Karsak; Ukraine

== Results ==
=== Qualification ===
Qualification: 56.00 m (Q) or at least 12 best (q) qualified for the final.

Rank	Group	Athlete	Nationality	#1	#2	#3	Result	Notes
1	B	Żaneta Glanc	Poland	54.53	58.57		58.57	Q
2	B	Zinaida Sendriūtė	Lithuania	52.86	53.75	57.70	57.70	Q
3	A	Dani Samuels	Australia	55.72	57.35		57.35	Q
4	B	Dragana Tomašević	Serbia	55.78	57.00		57.00	Q
5	A	Laura Bordignon	Italy	54.17	56.86		56.86	Q
6	A	Kateryna Karsak	Ukraine	56.34			56.34	Q
7	B	Vera Begić	Croatia	53.55	54.61	55.52	55.52	q
8	B	Sabine Rumpf	Germany	53.83	55.14	53.61	55.14	q
9	A	Ekaterina Strokova	Russia	55.08	52.95	50.82	55.08	q
10	B	Karen Gallardo	Chile	50.94	54.25	51.17	54.25	q
11	A	Sanna Kämäräinen	Finland	51.29	52.63	52.76	52.76	q
12	A	Valentina Aniballi	Italy	52.39	51.44	51.68	52.39	q
13	B	Agnieszka Jarmużek	Poland	51.78	49.85	x	51.78	
14	B	Simoné du Toit	South Africa	x	51.27	x	51.27	
15	A	Li Wen-Hua	Chinese Taipei	50.68	x	50.42	50.68	
16	B	Anu Teesaar	Estonia	50.52	x	45.85	50.52	PB
17	A	Dorothea Kalpakidov	Greece	49.58	48.64	x	49.58	
18	A	Eliška Staňková	Czech Republic	x	46.02	46.95	46.95	
19	B	Alexandra Klatsia	Cyprus	43.63	x	44.31	44.31	
	A	Lisa Hughes	United States	x	x	x	NM	
	B	Olohun Chonibarre Moufidath	Benin				DNS	

=== Final ===
Rank	Athlete	Nationality	#1	#2	#3	#4	#5	#6	Result	Notes
1st place, gold medalist(s)	Dani Samuels	Australia	57.36	62.48	61.75	x	60.92	x	62.48	
2nd place, silver medalist(s)	Żaneta Glanc	Poland	56.39	57.14	55.82	53.24	60.57	59.02	60.57	
3rd place, bronze medalist(s)	Kateryna Karsak	Ukraine	52.59	x	60.47	55.97	x	x	60.47	
4	Vera Begić	Croatia	59.30	54.89	57.05	x	x	x	59.30	
5	Laura Bordignon	Italy	x	54.14	57.05	55.93	55.14	x	57.05	
6	Ekaterina Strokova	Russia	44.06	x	56.65	52.99	x	48.81	56.65	PB
7	Zinaida Sendriūtė	Lithuania	55.65	55.40	x	53.76	51.73	53.46	55.65	
8	Karen Gallardo	Chile	55.38	53.11	53.60	51.78	50.48	52.63	55.38	
9	Sabine Rumpf	Germany	51.37	53.83	55.15				55.15	
10	Dragana Tomašević	Serbia	52.47	x	54.44				54.44	
11	Valentina Aniballi	Italy	50.98	51.61	x				51.61	
12	Sanna Kämäräinen	Finland	50.36	x	x				50.36	
