= 2004 World Junior Championships in Athletics – Women's discus throw =

The women's discus throw event at the 2004 World Junior Championships in Athletics was held in Grosseto, Italy, at Stadio Olimpico Carlo Zecchini on 13 and 14 July.

== Medalists ==
Gold	Ma Xuejun; China
Silver	Darya Pishchalnikova; Russia
Bronze	Nadine Müller; Germany

== Results ==
=== Final ===
14 July

Rank	Name	Nationality	Attempts						Result	Notes
Rank	Name	Nationality	1	2	3	4	5	6	Result	Notes
1st place, gold medalist(s)	Ma Xuejun	China	57.85	55.75	x	56.78	53.43	55.31	57.85	
2nd place, silver medalist(s)	Darya Pishchalnikova	Russia	54.39	x	x	55.52	x	57.37	57.37	
3rd place, bronze medalist(s)	Nadine Müller	Germany	50.55	57.06	56.96	53.36	54.82	57.13	57.13	
4	Wang Yu	China	54.48	54.94	56.61	56.03	54.18	56.07	56.61	
5	Svetlana Ivanova	Russia	46.53	49.48	x	x	45.50	51.86	51.86	
6	Veronika Watzek	Austria	45.92	50.34	x	50.56	49.52	46.14	50.56	
7	Vasylysa Zelenska	Ukraine	46.70	x	48.77	x	x	45.86	48.77	
8	Melissa Faubus	United States	43.48	46.64	47.67	x	48.53	x	48.53	
9	Calista Lyon	Australia	47.61	x	46.25				47.61	
10	Kristina Gehrig	Germany	43.81	46.49	44.22				46.49	
11	Annelies Peetroons	Belgium	45.87	45.06	44.54				45.87	
	Anna Brel	Belarus	x	x	x				NM	

=== Qualifications ===
13 July

==== Group A ====
Rank	Name	Nationality	Attempts			Result	Notes
Rank	Name	Nationality	1	2	3	Result	Notes
1	Darya Pishchalnikova	Russia	55.96	-	-	55.96	Q
2	Ma Xuejun	China	54.11	-	-	54.11	Q
3	Nadine Müller	Germany	53.51	-	-	53.51	Q
4	Anna Brel	Belarus	x	47.87	50.34	50.34	q
5	Veronika Watzek	Austria	44.56	49.43	x	49.43	q
6	Vasylysa Zelenska	Ukraine	39.35	45.60	48.93	48.93	q
7	Annelies Peetroons	Belgium	44.80	48.01	41.98	48.01	q
8	Melissa Faubus	United States	47.49	41.23	x	47.49	q
9	Sharmane Motuliki	Australia	46.47	41.06	x	46.47	
10	Magdel Venter	South Africa	44.23	46.42	x	46.42	
11	Magdaliní Komótoglou	Greece	x	46.06	44.13	46.06	
12	Sivan Jean	Israel	x	45.82	44.43	45.82	
13	Katarina Busljeta	Croatia	45.44	x	44.81	45.44	
14	Oksana Kot	Uzbekistan	42.16	42.82	45.13	45.13	
15	Lucie de Castro	France	44.88	x	44.86	44.88	

==== Group B ====
Rank	Name	Nationality	Attempts			Result	Notes
Rank	Name	Nationality	1	2	3	Result	Notes
1	Wang Yu	China	53.82	-	-	53.82	Q
2	Calista Lyon	Australia	50.76	50.20	50.39	50.76	q
3	Svetlana Ivanova	Russia	49.84	50.38	46.47	50.38	q
4	Kristina Gehrig	Germany	45.90	x	46.77	46.77	q
5	Lindsay Grigoriev	United States	46.59	x	46.60	46.60	
6	Denise Kemkers	Netherlands	x	x	46.04	46.04	
7	Inge Van Geel	Belgium	34.28	45.59	x	45.59	
8	Liliana Cá	Portugal	x	x	45.22	45.22	
9	Tatsiana Mialeshka	Belarus	45.01	37.03	x	45.01	
10	Josipa Jelicic	Croatia	43.86	41.91	44.85	44.85	
11	Marli Knoetze	South Africa	37.97	43.62	42.12	43.62	
12	Sophie Michel	France	x	x	43.49	43.49	
13	Klara Studer	Switzerland	41.51	40.39	x	41.51	
14	Sanna Kämäräinen	Finland	x	41.42	41.06	41.42	
15	Kateryna Karsak	Ukraine	39.29	22.55	x	39.29	

== Participation ==
According to an unofficial count, 30 athletes from 19 countries participated in the event.

- Australia (2)
- Austria (1)
- Belarus (2)
- Belgium (2)
- China (2)
- Croatia (2)
- Finland (1)
- France (2)
- Germany (2)
- Greece (1)
- Israel (1)
- Netherlands (1)
- Portugal (1)
- Russia (2)
- South Africa (2)
- Switzerland (1)
- Ukraine (2)
- United States (2)
- Uzbekistan (1)
