= 2010 European Athletics Championships – Women's discus throw =

Women's discus throw at the European Athletics Championships

The women's discus throw at the 2010 European Athletics Championships was held at the Estadi Olímpic Lluís Companys on 27 and 28 July.

== Medalists ==
Gold	Sandra Perković; Croatia (CRO)
Silver	Nicoleta Grasu; Romania (ROU)
Bronze	Joanna Wiśniewska; Poland (POL)

== Records ==
Standing records prior to the 2010 European Athletics Championships
World record	Gabriele Reinsch (GDR)	76.80	Neubrandenburg, East Germany	9 July 1988
European record	Gabriele Reinsch (GDR)	76.80	Neubrandenburg, East Germany	9 July 1988
Championship record	Diana Sachse (GDR)	71.36	Stuttgart, West Germany	28 August 1986
World Leading	Nadine Müller (GER)	67.78	Wiesbaden, Germany	8 May 2010
European Leading	Nadine Müller (GER)	67.78	Wiesbaden, Germany	8 May 2010

== Schedule ==
Date	Time	Round
27 July 2010	12:45	Qualification
28 July 2010	18:30	Final

== Results ==
=== Qualification ===
Qualification: Qualification Performance 60.00 (Q) or at least 12 best performers advance to the final

Rank	Group	Athlete	Nationality	#1	#2	#3	Result	Notes
1	B	Nicoleta Grasu	Romania	x	55.60	62.10	62.10	Q
2	B	Nadine Müller	Germany	60.54			60.54	Q
3	B	Wioletta Potępa	Poland	x	56.91	60.45	60.45	Q
4	A	Dragana Tomašević	Serbia	58.60	59.24	57.89	59.24	q
5	A	Zinaida Sendriūtė	Lithuania	57.51	58.98	x	58.98	q, SB
6	A	Anna Söderberg	Sweden	58.96	57.97	x	58.96	q
7	A	Joanna Wiśniewska	Poland	58.93	57.82	58.67	58.93	q
8	A	Sabine Rumpf	Germany	57.87	x	58.41	58.41	q
9	A	Monique Jansen	Netherlands	55.09	55.83	57.75	57.75	q
10	A	Sandra Perković	Croatia	49.25	57.70	x	57.70	q
11	A	Natalya Sadova	Russia	54.96	57.19	x	57.19	q
12	B	Svetlana Saykina	Russia	55.42	10.55	56.32	56.32	q
13	B	Żaneta Glanc	Poland	x	x	55.50	55.50	
14	A	Liliana Cá	Portugal	52.63	55.47	x	55.47	
15	B	Kateryna Karsak	Ukraine	x	55.41	x	55.41	
16	B	Vera Begić	Croatia	54.66	x	55.04	55.04	
17	B	Sofia Larsson	Sweden	x	50.69	54.50	54.50	
18	A	Grete Etholm	Norway	40.63	52.17	54.01	54.01	
19	B	Laura Bordignon	Italy	53.82	52.59	x	53.82	
20	B	Sanna Kämäräinen	Finland	53.07	52.94	x	53.07	
21	A	Irache Quintanal	Spain	48.40	50.81	x	50.81	
	A	Tanja Komulainen	Finland	x	x	x	NM	
	B	Věra Pospíšilová-Cechlová	Czech Republic	x	x	x	NM	

=== Final ===
Rank	Athlete	Nationality	#1	#2	#3	#4	#5	#6	Result	Notes
1st place, gold medalist(s)	Sandra Perković	Croatia	62.98	60.94	55.04	60.95	62.43	64.67	64.67	
2nd place, silver medalist(s)	Nicoleta Grasu	Romania	63.48	61.02	63.07	60.22	x	58.34	63.48	
3rd place, bronze medalist(s)	Joanna Wiśniewska	Poland	59.45	x	56.32	62.37	x	x	62.37	SB
4	Natalya Sadova	Russia	60.43	x	x	x	61.10	61.20	61.20	
5	Zinaida Sendriūtė	Lithuania	60.48	57.20	59.47	57.89	57.01	60.70	60.70	PB
6	Dragana Tomašević	Serbia	59.38	x	60.10	56.71	x	59.22	60.10	
7	Sabine Rumpf	Germany	56.80	55.81	58.56	58.83	58.89	57.77	58.89	
8	Nadine Müller	Germany	57.78	x	55.58	56.39	56.59	x	57.78	
9	Monique Jansen	Netherlands	55.05	x	56.29				56.29	
10	Svetlana Saykina	Russia	56.09	x	x				56.09	
11	Anna Söderberg	Sweden	55.60	x	53.62				55.60	
12	Wioletta Potępa	Poland	x	55.48	55.13				55.48	
