= Athletics at the 2008 Summer Olympics – Women's discus throw =

Women's discus throw at the Games of the XXIX Olympiad
- Venue: Beijing National Stadium
- Date: 15 August 2008 (qualification); 18 August 2008 (final)
- Competitors: 38 from 24 nations
- Winning distance: 64.74

Medalists
1st place, gold medalist(s)		Stephanie Brown Trafton	United States
2nd place, silver medalist(s)		Olena Antonova	Ukraine
3rd place, bronze medalist(s)		Song Aimin	China

The women's discus throw event at the 2008 Olympic Games took place on 15–18 August at the Beijing Olympic Stadium.

== Summary ==
The qualifying standards were 61.00 m (200.13 ft) (A standard) and 59.00 m (193.57 ft) (B standard).

On the sixth throw of the competition, world leader Stephanie Brown Trafton settled the results, throwing 64.74 m (212 ft 4 in). The next thrower in the ring Yarelis Barrios threw 63.17m which would be good enough for second place. Barrios improved to 63.64m in the second round to assure her hold on second place. The final thrower in the first round, Olena Antonova pulled into third position, which she gradually improved to her best of 62.59 in the fifth round. Through the rest of the competition, Brown Trafton didn't land another throw that would be competitive with the leaders, but she didn't need to. Song Aimin struggled with the worst throw of the opening round and was flirting with elimination until her third round throw which put her into fourth place. Song solidified that position with a fifth round 62.20, which would later become relevant.

Eight years after the event, the IOC reanalyzed doping samples of silver medalist Yarelis Barrios and disqualified her for having the masking agent acetazolamide in her sample. She was stripped of her medal. If the IOC reallocates medals, Antonova stands to advance to the silver medal and Song would get bronze. On May 24, 2017, medals were reallocated.

== Schedule ==
All times are China standard time (UTC+8)

Date	Time	Round
Friday, 15 August 2008	19:55	Qualifications
Monday, 18 August 2008	19:00	Finals

== Records ==
Prior to this competition, the existing world and Olympic records were as follows.

World record	Gabriele Reinsch (GDR)	76.80	Neubrandenburg, East Germany	9 July 1988
Olympic record	Martina Hellmann (GDR)	72.30	Seoul, South Korea	29 September 1988

No new world or Olympic records were set for this event.

== Results ==
=== Qualifying round ===
Qualification: 61.50 (Q) or at least 12 best performers (q) advance to the Final.

Rank	Group	Name	Nationality	#1	#2	#3	Result	Notes
1	A	Stephanie Brown Trafton	United States	57.78	x	62.77	62.77	Q
2	B	Nicoleta Grasu	Romania	57.75	62.51		62.51	Q
3	A	Iryna Yatchenko	Belarus	62.26			62.26	Q
DSQ	A	Yarelis Barrios	Cuba	62.23			62.23	Q
5	A	Mélina Robert-Michon	France	x	55.18	62.21	62.21	Q, SB
6	B	Aretha Thurmond	United States	58.70	61.90		61.90	Q
7	A	Dani Samuels	Australia	x	x	61.72	61.72	Q
8	B	Song Aimin	China	59.89	61.31	61.67	61.67	Q
9	B	Vera Pospíšilová-Cechlová	Czech Republic	61.61			61.61	Q
10	B	Li Yanfeng	China	60.99	61.29	x	61.29	q
11	A	Olena Antonova	Ukraine	61.25	60.61	59.92	61.25	q
12	A	Ellina Zvereva	Belarus	x	60.28	59.60	60.28	q
13	B	Dragana Tomašević	Serbia	55.59	x	60.19	60.19	
14	A	Natalia Semenova	Ukraine	x	60.18	x	60.18	
15	B	Yania Ferrales	Cuba	59.87	58.73	59.85	59.87	
16	B	Svetlana Saykina	Russia	x	x	59.48	59.48	
17	A	Wioletta Potępa	Poland	59.44	59.20	59.10	59.44	
18	A	Joanna Wiśniewska	Poland	59.40	58.08	x	59.40	
19	A	Elisângela Adriano	Brazil	x	x	58.84	58.84	
20	B	Elizna Naudé	South Africa	58.75	57.09	58.35	58.75	
21	A	Kateryna Karsak	Ukraine	x	53.14	58.61	58.61	
22	A	Vera Begić	Croatia	55.87	58.50	x	58.50	
23	A	Ma Xuejun	China	58.45	x	56.84	58.45	
24	B	Krishna Poonia	India	57.31	58.23	58.15	58.23	
25	B	Natalya Sadova	Russia	x	58.11	57.76	58.11	
26	A	Suzy Powell-Roos	United States	58.02	x	x	58.02	
27	A	Philippa Roles	Great Britain	x	56.88	57.44	57.44	
28	B	Beatrice Faumuina	New Zealand	57.15	x	54.49	57.15	
29	B	Hanna Mazgunova	Belarus	x	x	56.77	56.77	
30	A	Harwant Kaur	India	56.38	56.38	56.42	56.42	
31	B	Anna Söderberg	Sweden	x	55.28	53.48	55.28	
32	A	Oxana Yesipchuk	Russia	54.91	54.34	55.07	55.07	
33	B	Zinaida Sendriūtė	Lithuania	54.81	53.41	52.42	54.81	
34	B	Venera Getova	Bulgaria	52.51	54.00	52.40	54.00	
35	B	Dorothea Kalpakidou	Greece	x	53.00	51.61	53.00	
36	B	Barbara Rocio Comba	Argentina	x	x	51.36	51.36	
37	A	Tereapii Tapoki	Cook Islands	46.77	44.11	48.35	48.35	
	B	Żaneta Glanc	Poland	x	x	x	NM	

AR area record | CR championship record | GR games record | NR national record | OR Olympic record | PB personal best | SB season best | WL world leading (in a given season)
DNS = did not start | DQ = disqualification | NM = no mark (i.e. no valid result) | Q = qualification by place in heat | q = qualification by overall place

=== Final ===
Rank	Athlete	Nationality	1st	2nd	3rd	4th	5th	6th	Result	Notes
1st place, gold medalist(s)	Stephanie Brown Trafton	United States	64.74	x	x	58.39	61.30	x	64.74	
2nd place, silver medalist(s)	Olena Antonova	Ukraine	60.79	62.16	x	60.50	62.59	62.34	62.59	SB
3rd place, bronze medalist(s)	Song Aimin	China	56.41	59.55	62.17	61.75	62.20	60.51	62.20	
4	Vera Pospíšilová-Cechlová	Czech Republic	x	61.08	x	58.74	61.75	61.66	61.75	
5	Ellina Zvereva	Belarus	60.43	60.10	x	x	60.34	60.82	60.82	
6	Li Yanfeng	China	60.68	x	59.72	x	x	60.62	60.68	
7	Mélina Robert-Michon	France	60.49	x	x	x	60.66	60.45	60.66	
8	Dani Samuels	Australia	57.14	x	60.15				60.15	
9	Aretha Thurmond	United States	56.72	59.80	57.99				59.80	
10	Iryna Yatchenko	Belarus	x	x	59.27				59.27	
11	Nicoleta Grasu	Romania	58.63	x	x				58.63	
DSQ (2nd)	Yarelis Barrios	Cuba	63.17	63.64	62.22	62.12	x	60.30	63.64	

AR area record | CR championship record | GR games record | NR national record | OR Olympic record | PB personal best | SB season best | WL world leading (in a given season)
DNS = did not start | DQ = disqualification | NM = no mark (i.e. no valid result) | Q = qualification by place in heat | q = qualification by overall place
