= Dragana Tomašević =

Serbian discus thrower

Personal information
- Native name: Драгана Томашевић
- Nationality: Serbian
- Born: 4 June 1982 (age 44) Sremska Mitrovica, SR Serbia, SFR Yugoslavia
- Height: 1.75 m (5 ft 9 in)
- Weight: 80 kg (176 lb)

Sport
- Sport: Track and field
- Events: Discus Throw, Shot Put

Achievements and titles
- Personal bests: Discus Throw: 63.63 m Shot Put: 14.81 m
Medal record
Representing Serbia and Montenegro / Serbia
Mediterranean Games
Gold medal – first place	2005 Almería	Discus Throw
Silver medal – second place	2013 Mersin	Discus Throw
Bronze medal – third place	2009 Pescara	Discus Throw
Universiade
Bronze medal – third place	2005 İzmir	Discus Throw
Bronze medal – third place	2007 Bangkok	Discus Throw
European Winter Throwing Cup
Bronze medal – third place	2008 Split	Discus Throw
Bronze medal – third place	2013 Castellon	Discus Throw
Bronze medal – third place	2014 Leiria	Discus Throw
Silver medal – second place	2017 Gran Canaria	Discus Throw

Dragana Tomašević (Serbian Cyrillic: Драгана Томашевић; born 4 June 1982) is a Serbian discus thrower. Since 8 August 2006, she is holder of the Serbian national record in discus throw with her personal best shot of 63.63 m.

== Career ==
Early in her career Dragana competed in Shot Put, without any major success.

In her primary discipline, Discus Throw she competed in four Olympic Games, eight World Championships and six European Championships. Her best result in these competitions is 6th place at the 2010 and 2018 European Championships, while her best finish in World Championships is 7th place in 2005 and 2011, respectively.

On 8 August 2006, she set the Serbian national record in Discus Throw with her personal best shot of 63.63 m.

== Personal bests ==
Event	Performance	Date	Location	Notes
Discus throw	63.63 m	8 August 2006	Gothenburg, Sweden	NR
Shot put	14.81 m	30 May 2004	Moscow, Russia	

== Achievements ==
Year	Competition	Venue	Position	Notes
Representing Serbia and Montenegro
2001	European Junior Championships	Grosseto, Italy	10th	48.53 m
2003	European U23 Championships	Bydgoszcz, Poland	11th	51.27 m
2004	Olympic Games	Athens, Greece	38th (q)	54.44 m
2005	Mediterranean Games	Almería, Spain	1st	62.10 m
2005	World Championships	Helsinki, Finland	7th	60.56 m
2005	Universiade	İzmir, Turkey	3rd	59.92 m
Representing Serbia
2006	European Championships	Gothenburg, Sweden	8th	60.20 m
2007	Universiade	Bangkok, Thailand	3rd	56.82 m
2007	World Championships	Osaka, Japan	20th (q)	57.96 m
2008	European Cup Winter Throwing	Split, Croatia	3rd	59.64 m
2008	Olympic Games	Beijing, China	13th (q)	60.19 m
2009	Mediterranean Games	Pescara, Italy	3rd	58.73 m
2009	Universiade	Belgrade, Serbia	10th	54.44 m
2009	World Championships	Berlin, Germany	19th (q)	59.38 m
2010	European Championships	Barcelona, Spain	6th	60.10 m
2011	World Championships	Daegu, South Korea	7th	62.48 m
2012	European Championships	Helsinki, Finland	9th	58.34 m
2012	Olympic Games	London, United Kingdom	19th (q)	60.53 m
2013	European Cup Winter Throwing	Castellón de la Plana, Spain	3rd	61.12 m
2013	Mediterranean Games	Mersin, Turkey	2nd	61.88 m
2013	World Championships	Moscow, Russia	14th (q)	58.79 m
2014	European Cup Winter Throwing	Leiria, Portugal	3rd	59.26 m
2014	European Championships	Zurich, Switzerland	16th (q)	52.21 m
2015	World Championships	Beijing, China	20th (q)	58.98 m
2016	European Championships	Amsterdam, Netherlands	11th	56.83 m
2016	Olympic Games	Rio de Janeiro, Brazil	19th (q)	57.67 m
2017	European Throwing Cup	Las Palmas, Spain	2nd	59.60 m
2017	World Championships	London, United Kingdom	19th (q)	57.78 m
2018	European Championships	Berlin, Germany	6th	58.94 m
2019	World Championships	Doha, Qatar	21st (q)	57.13 m
2021	European Throwing Cup	Split, Croatia	4th	60.19 m
2021	Olympic Games	Tokyo, Japan	26th (q)	56.95 m
2022	European Championships	Munich, Germany	20th (q)	55.51 m

== See also ==
- Serbian records in athletics
