= Monique Jansen =

Dutch discus thrower

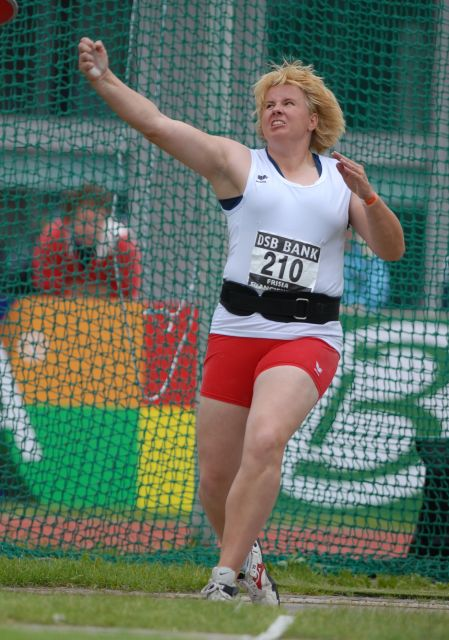
- Jansen in 2007

Personal information
- Full name: Liesbeth Monique Jansen
- Born: 3 October 1978 (age 47) Harderwijk, Netherlands
- Height: 1.87 m (6 ft 2 in)
- Weight: 95 kg (209 lb)

Sport
- Country: Netherlands
- Sport: Athletics
- Event: Discus
- Updated on 14 August 2012

Liesbeth Monique Jansen (born 3 October 1978, Harderwijk) is a Dutch athlete specializing in the discus throw. She competed for the Netherlands at the 2012 Summer Olympics, failing to qualify for the final.

== Competition record ==
Year	Competition	Venue	Position	Notes
Representing Netherlands
2010	European Championships	Barcelona, Spain	9th	56.29 m
2011	World Championships	Daegu, South Korea	17th (q)	58.23 m
2012	European Championships	Helsinki, Finland	11th	57.03 m
2012	Olympic Games	London, United Kingdom	31st (q)	57.50 m
