= Sabine Rumpf =

German discus thrower

Sabine Rumpf (born 18 March 1983 in Wiesbaden) is a German former discus thrower.

== Achievements ==
| Year | Competition | Venue | Position | Event | Notes |
Representing Germany
| 2001 | European Junior Championships | Grosseto, Italy | 7th | Discus throw | 52.39 m |
| 2002 | World Junior Championships | Kingston, Jamaica | 4th | Discus throw | 54.82 m |
| 2003 | European U23 Championships | Bydgoszcz, Poland | 7th | Discus throw | 52.30 m |
| 2005 | European U23 Championships | Erfurt, Germany | 1st | Discus throw | 60.75 m |
| 2005 | Universiade | İzmir, Turkey | 5th | Discus throw | 58.22 m |
| 2009 | Universiade | Belgrade, Serbia | 9th | Discus throw | 55.15 m |
| 2010 | European Championships | Barcelona, Spain | 7th | Discus throw | 58.89 m |
