= Athletics at the 2011 Pan American Games – Women's discus throw =

Women's discus throw at the 2011 Pan American Games
- Venue: Telmex Athletics Stadium
- Dates: October 28
- Competitors: 11 from 8 nations

Medalists
Gold medal	Yarelys Barrios	Cuba
Silver medal	Aretha Thurmond	United States
Bronze medal	Denia Caballero	Cuba

The women's discus throw event of the athletics events at the 2011 Pan American Games was held the 28 of October at the Telmex Athletics Stadium. The defending Pan American Games champion is Yarelys Barrios of the Cuba.

== Records ==
Prior to this competition, the existing world and Pan American Games records were as follows:

World record	Gabriele Reinsch (GER)	76.80	Neubrandenburg, East Germany	July 9, 1988
Pan American Games record	Maritza Martén (CUB)	65.58	Indianapolis, United States	August 10, 1987

== Qualification ==
Each National Olympic Committee (NOC) was able to enter up to two entrants providing they had met the minimum standard (48.50) in the qualifying period (January 1, 2010 to September 14, 2011).

== Schedule ==
Date	Time	Round
October 28, 2011	15:00	Final

== Results ==
All distances shown are in meters:centimeters

KEY:	q	Fastest non-qualifiers	Q	Qualified	NR	National record	PB	Personal best	SB	Seasonal best

=== Final ===
The final was held on October 28.

Rank	Athlete	Nationality	#1	#2	#3	#4	#5	#6	Result	Notes
1st place, gold medalist(s)	Yarelys Barrios	Cuba	66.40	62.88	x	63.13	63.41	61.39	66.40	PR
2nd place, silver medalist(s)	Aretha Thurmond	United States	57.59	56.69	57.75	59.16	59.53	x	59.53	
3rd place, bronze medalist(s)	Denia Caballero	Cuba	58.63	x	57.42	x	x	54.82	58.63	
4	Gia Lewis-Smallwood	United States	x	51.92	52.08	57.34	x	x	57.34	
5	Karen Gallardo	Chile	54.10	57.13	56.06	57.17	x	x	57.17	
6	Rocío Comba	Argentina	x	54.12	x	56.05	x	54.98	56.05	SB
7	Fernanda Raquel Borges	Brazil	x	52.75	52.53	x	54.56	53.75	54.56	
8	Elisângela Adriano	Brazil	x	x	54.08	x	53.46	x	54.08	
9	Allison Randall	Jamaica	45.96	49.42	50.90				50.90	
10	Irais Estrada	Mexico	44.66	47.58	49.52				49.52	
11	Brittni Borrero	Puerto Rico	46.87	x	x				46.87	
