= Yarisley Collado =

Cuban discus thrower

Personal information
- Full name: Yarisley Collado Lufriu
- Born: 30 April 1985 (age 41) Havana, Cuba

Sport
- Country: Cuba
- Sport: Athletics
- Updated on 14 June 2013

Yarisley Collado Lufriu (also Yanisley; born 30 April 1985; other sources state 5 May 1985) is a Cuban discus thrower. Her personal best is 64.10 metres, achieved in May 2009 in Fortaleza.

She competed at the 2009 World Championships without reaching the final. She also won the silver medal at the 2009 Central American and Caribbean Championships.

== Personal bests ==
- Discus throw: 64.10 m – Fortaleza, Brazil, 10 May 2009

== Achievements ==
Year	Competition	Venue	Position	Event	Notes
2005	ALBA Games	Havana, Cuba	3rd	Discus	53.47 m
2007	ALBA Games	Caracas, Venezuela	2nd	Discus	54.47 m
2009	ALBA Games	Havana, Cuba	1st	Discus	63.86 m
2009	Central American and Caribbean Championships	Havana, Cuba	2nd	Discus	61.33 m
2009	World Championships	Berlin, Germany	14th (q)	Discus	60.37 m
2010	Ibero-American Championships	San Fernando, Spain	1st	Discus	60.23 m
