= Liliana Cá =

Portuguese discus thrower (born 1986)

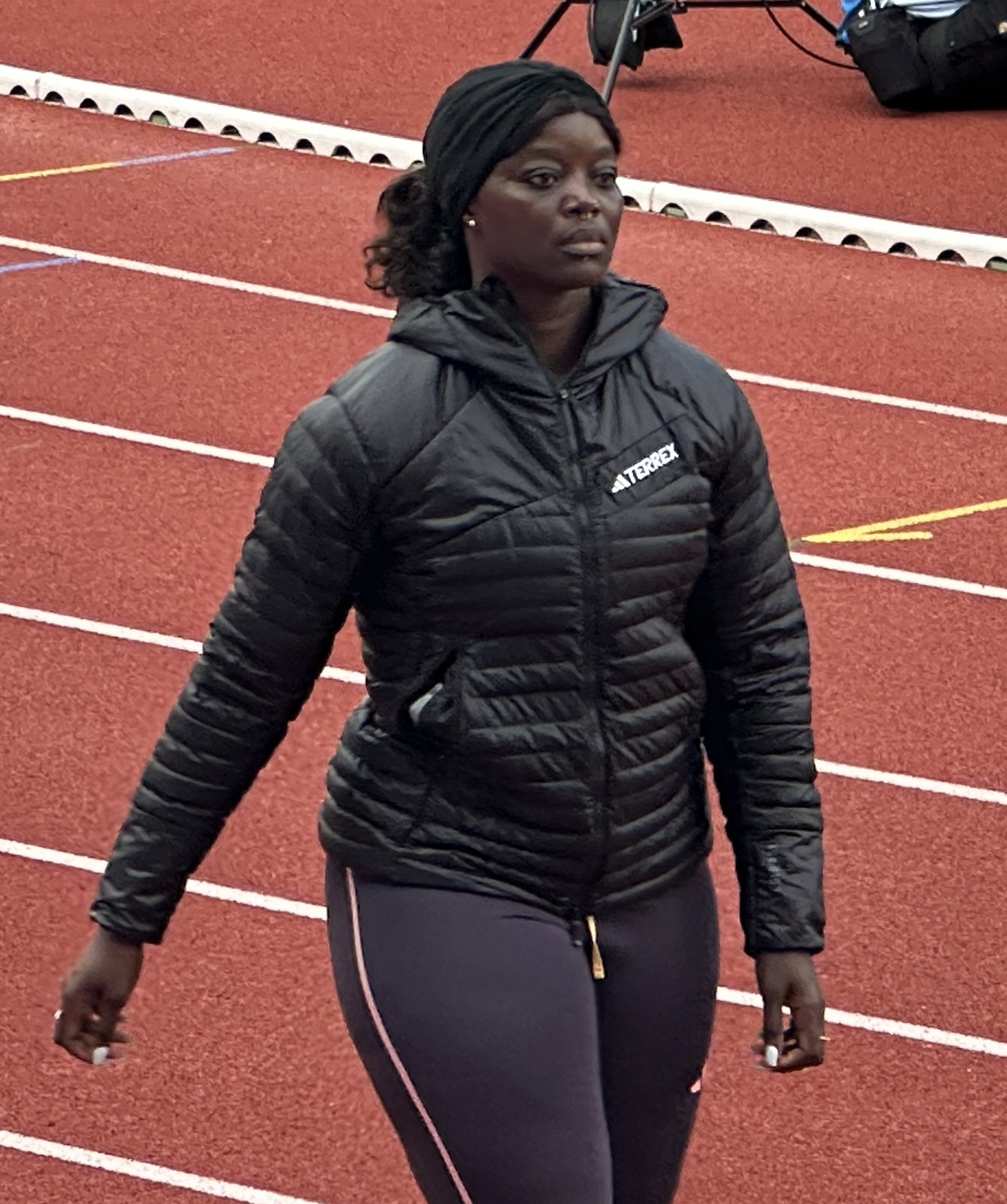
- Liliana Cá at the 2024 Bislett Games

Personal information
- Full name: Liliana da Silva Cá
- Born: 5 November 1986 (age 39) Barreiro, Portugal
- Height: 1.84 m (6 ft 0 in)
- Weight: 93 kg (205 lb)

Sport
- Sport: Athletics
- Event: Discus throw
- Coached by: Herédio Costa
Medal record
Women's athletics
Representing Portugal
European Championships
Bronze medal – third place	2024 Rome	Discus throw
European Throwing Cup
Silver medal – second place	2025 Nicosia	Discus Throw

Liliana da Silva Cá (born 5 November 1986) is a Portuguese athlete specialising in the discus throw. At club level she represents Sporting Lisbon.

== Career ==
Cá won a silver medal at the 2018 Mediterranean Games. She had a five-year break in her career between 2013 and 2018 to raise children.

Her personal best in the event is 66.40 metres set in Leiria in 2021, a national record. On 27 February 2021, Liliana threw 65.10 m in a preparation test in Vagos and got the entry standard for the Tokyo Olympic Games. She holds the Portuguese record for the discus throw in front of Teresa Machado (65.40 m) in 1998 and Irina Rodrigues (63.96 m) in 2016.

== Personal life ==
Born and raised in Portugal, Cá is of Bissau-Guinean descent.

== International competitions ==
Year	Competition	Venue	Position	Notes
Representing Portugal
2003	European Youth Olympic Festival	Paris, France	1st	47.53 m
2004	World Junior Championships	Grosseto, Italy	21st (q)	45.22 m
2005	European Junior Championships	Kaunas, Lithuania	2nd	49.69 m
2007	European U23 Championships	Debrecen, Hungary	7th	51.43 m
2010	Ibero-American Championships	San Fernando, Spain	8th	51.91 m
2010	European Championships	Barcelona, Spain	14th (q)	55.47 m
2018	Mediterranean Games	Tarragona, Spain	2nd	60.05 m
2018	European Championships	Berlin, Germany	7th	58.91 m
2019	World Championships	Doha, Qatar	26th (q)	54.31 m
2021	Olympic Games	Tokyo, Japan	5th	63.93 m
2022	Mediterranean Games	Oran, Algeria	2nd	63.62 m
2022	World Championships	Eugene, United States	6th	63.99 m
2022	European Championships	Munich, Germany	5th	63.67 m
2023	World Championships	Budapest, Hungary	8th	63.59 m
2024	European Championships	Rome, Italy	3rd	64.53 m
2024	Olympic Games	Paris, France	14th (q)	62.43 m
2025	World Championships	Tokyo, Japan	16th (q)	59.79 m
2026	European Championships	Birmingham, United Kingdom	8th	60.87 m
