= Venera Getova =

Bulgarian discus thrower

Venera Getova (Bulgarian: Венера Гетова, born 13 December 1980 in Pleven) is a female discus thrower from Bulgaria. Her personal best is 59.08 metres, achieved in June 2008 in Sofia.

She competed at the 2008 Olympic Games at the 2009 World Championships without reaching the final.
