= Athletics at the 2011 Summer Universiade – Women's discus throw =

The women's discus throw event at the 2011 Summer Universiade was held on 17 August.

== Results ==
Rank	Athlete	Nationality	#1	#2	#3	#4	#5	#6	Result	Notes
1st place, gold medalist(s)	Żaneta Glanc	Poland	58.14	62.16	59.21	x	59.30	63.99	63.99	PB
2nd place, silver medalist(s)	Zinaida Sendriūtė	Lithuania	x	56.32	62.49	59.72	59.49	61.71	62.49	
3rd place, bronze medalist(s)	Svetlana Saykina	Russia	x	60.81	60.73	x	x	60.24	60.81	
4	Vera Ganeyeva	Russia	57.75	60.29	59.17	59.02	59.53	x	60.29	
5	Jiang Fengjing	China	x	55.89	59.65	56.19	x	57.11	59.65	
6	Li Wen-Hua	Chinese Taipei	55.42	53.75	x	54.33	56.48	x	56.48	SB
7	Fernanda Martins	Brazil	54.66	54.93	56.46	55.63	x	x	56.46	
8	Simoné du Toit	South Africa	53.64	x	53.41	x	53.97	51.57	53.97	
9	Irina Rodrigues	Portugal	52.22	53.12	51.08				53.12	
10	Sanna Kämäräinen	Finland	49.42	53.11	x				53.11	
11	Nastassia Kashtanava	Belarus	x	52.00	x				52.00	
12	Inga Miķelsone	Latvia	45.37	44.02	43.23				45.37	
13	Yap Jeng Tzan	Malaysia	43.19	41.69	x				43.19	
	Janneth Acan	Uganda							DNS	
