= Kateryna Karsak =

Ukrainian discus thrower

Personal information
- Born: December 26, 1985 (age 40)
- Height: 1.82 m (5 ft 11 1/2 in)
- Weight: 89 kg (196 lb)

Sport
- Country: Ukraine
- Sport: Athletics
- Event: Discus
Medal record
Women's athletics
Representing Ukraine
European Team Championships
Gold medal – first place	2011 Stockholm	Discus throw
Bronze medal – third place	2010 Bergen	Discus throw
Summer Universiade
Bronze medal – third place	2009 Belgrade	Discus throw
European U23 Championships
Gold medal – first place	2007 Debrecen	Discus throw
Bronze medal – third place	2005 Erfurt	Discus throw
European Youth Olympic Festival
Silver medal – second place	2001 Murcia	Discus throw
- Updated on 14 August 2012

Kateryna Karsak (born December 26, 1985) is a discus thrower from Ukraine.

She finished 4th in the discus final at the 2006 European Athletics Championships in Gothenburg with a throw of 62.45m. She won the European Under 23 Discus championship in Debrecen, Hungary in July 2007 with a throw of 64.40m.

== Competition record ==
Year	Competition	Venue	Position	Notes
Representing Ukraine
2004	World Junior Championships	Grosseto, Italy	30th (q)	39.29 m
2005	European U23 Championships	Erfurt, Germany	3rd	56.81 m
2006	European Championships	Gothenburg, Sweden	4th	62.45 m
2007	European U23 Championships	Debrecen, Hungary	1st	64.40 m
2007	World Championships	Osaka, Japan	16th (q)	59.46 m
2008	Olympic Games	Beijing, China	21st (q)	58.61 m
2009	Universiade	Belgrade, Serbia	3rd	60.47 m
2009	World Championships	Berlin, Germany	27th (q)	56.79 m
2010	European Championships	Barcelona, Spain	15th (q)	55.41 m
2011	World Championships	Daegu, South Korea	20th (q)	58.27 m
2012	Olympic Games	London, Great Britain	28th (q)	58.64 m
