= Sabina Asenjo =

Spanish discus thrower (born 1986)

Personal information
- Born: 3 August 1986 (age 39) Ponferrada, Spain
- Height: 1.81 m (5 ft 11 in)
- Weight: 95 kg (209 lb)

Sport
- Sport: Track and field
- Event: Discus throw
- Club: ADUS-Sol Power

Sabina Asenjo Álvarez (born 3 August 1986) is a Spanish athlete whose specialty is the discus throw. She competed at the 2015 World Championships in Beijing without qualifying for the final. Her personal best in the event is 61.89 metres set in Bilbao in 2016. This is the current national record.

== Competition record ==
Year	Competition	Venue	Position	Event	Notes
Representing Spain
2005	European Junior Championships	Kaunas, Lithuania	12th	Discus throw	43.03 m
2007	European U23 Championships	Debrecen, Hungary	15th (q)	Discus throw	49.29 m
2012	Ibero-American Championships	Barquisimeto, Venezuela	6th	Discus throw	54.06 m
2012	European Championships	Helsinki, Finland	18th (q)	Discus throw	53.92 m
2013	Mediterranean Games	Mersin, Turkey	5th	Discus throw	53.25 m
2014	European Championships	Zurich, Switzerland	–	Discus throw	NM
2015	World Championships	Beijing, China	24th (q)	Discus throw	58.04 m
2016	European Championships	Amsterdam, Netherlands	12th	Discus throw	56.58 m
2016	Olympic Games	Rio de Janeiro, Brazil	23rd (q)	Discus throw	56.94 m
2017	World Championships	London, United Kingdom	20th (q)	Discus throw	57.00 m
2018	Mediterranean Games	Tarragona, Spain	5th	Discus throw	57.41 m
2018	European Championships	Berlin, Germany	15th (q)	Discus throw	55.57 m
