= Sanna Kämäräinen =

Finnish discus thrower

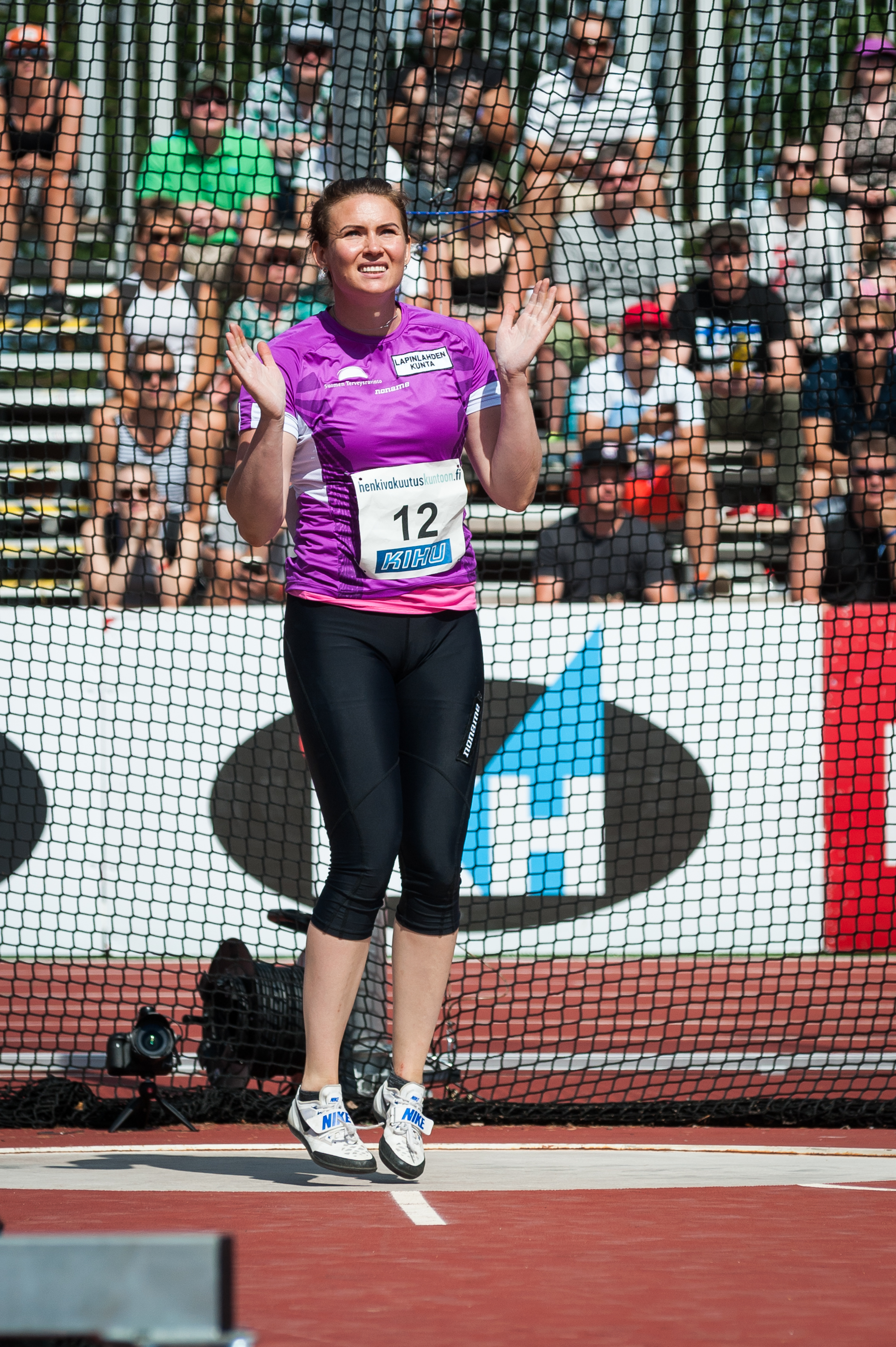
Sanna Kämäräinen 2018

Sanna Kämäräinen (born 8 February 1986 in Lapinlahti) is a Finnish athlete specialising in the discus throw. She finished seventh at the 2014 European Championships.

Her personal best in the event is 61.07 metres, set in Leiria in 2015. In addition, with 54.75 metres she is the Finnish record holder in the rarely contested indoor discus throw.

== Competition record ==
Year	Competition	Venue	Position	Notes
Representing Finland
2004	World Junior Championships	Grosseto, Italy	29th (q)	41.42 m
2005	European Junior Championships	Kaunas, Lithuania	7th	45.24 m
2007	European U23 Championships	Debrecen, Hungary	13th (q)	50.04 m
2009	Universiade	Belgrade, Serbia	12th	50.36 m
2010	European Championships	Barcelona, Spain	20th (q)	53.07 m
2011	Universiade	Shenzhen, China	10th	53.11 m
2012	European Championships	Helsinki, Finland	21st (q)	52.21 m
2013	Universiade	Kazan, Russia	7th	51.41 m
2014	European Championships	Zürich, Switzerland	7th	60.52 m
2015	World Championships	Beijing, China	27th (q)	56.68 m
2018	European Championships	Berlin, Germany	19th (q)	54.76 m
