= 2009 World Championships in Athletics – Women's discus throw =

Discus throw event at 2009 World Athletic Championships

The women's discus throw at the 2009 World Championships in Athletics was held at the Olympic Stadium on August 19 and August 21.

Reigning Olympic champion Stephanie Brown Trafton was the favourite for the gold. She had set a career best and had the four longest throws of any athlete that season, although she had not competed since late June. Franka Dietzsch was another prominent performer: the 41-year-old was the defending champion and was making her 10th appearance of the tournament, but a weak season had underlined her waning powers. Cuban Yarelis Barrios looked set to build upon her World and Olympic silver medals from the last two years and Aimin Song had also performed well during the season. Veteran athletes Nicoleta Grasu and Natalya Sadova were also favoured to be among the top performers of the competition.

Chinese athletes led the qualification rounds with Ma Xuejun and Song topping their respective groups. Newcomers Żaneta Glanc and Dani Samuels rounded out the top four qualifiers. Dietzsch sole legal throw of the competition was not enough for qualification, leaving Nadine Müller as the only host competitor to make the final. Brown Trafton edged into the final, needing all three throws to qualify.

In the final, Grasu and Barrios quickly established themselves with marks of 65.20 m and 64.44 m, respectively, in the first two throws. Samuels, Glanc and Müller proved themselves on their third attempts, each throwing over 62 metres. Brown Trafton and Ma Xuejun both threw poorly and were among the four athletes eliminated after three throws. Personal bests of 64.76 and 65.44 m in the fourth and fifth round put Samuels in the lead. On the final throws, Song threw only enough to move up to fifth place, leader Grasu fouled but Barrios responded, although her mark of 65.31 m guaranteed her only second place.

Samuels was a surprise winner: at 21 years old, she was the youngest ever World discus champion, and she had progressed from Youth champion, to Junior winner, to the senior title in just four years. Barrios had matched her silver medal achievement at the 2008 Summer Olympics, and Grasu's bronze was her fourth medal in her career at the World Championships.

== Medalists ==
| Gold | Dani Samuels; Australia (AUS) |
| Silver | Yarelis Barrios; Cuba (CUB) |
| Bronze | Nicoleta Grasu; Romania (ROM) |

== Records ==
| World record | Gabriele Reinsch (GDR) | 76.80 | Neubrandenburg, East Germany | 7 July 1988 |
| Championship record | Martina Hellmann (GDR) | 71.62 | Rome, Italy | 31 August 1987 |
| World leading | Stephanie Brown Trafton (USA) | 66.21 | San Mateo, United States | 24 May 2009 |
| African record | Elizna Naudé (RSA) | 64.87 | Stellenbosch, South Africa | 2 March 2003 |
| Asian record | Xiao Yanling (CHN) | 71.68 | Beijing, China | 14 March 1992 |
| North American record | Hilda Ramos (CUB) | 70.88 | Havana, Cuba | 8 May 1992 |
| South American record | Elisângela Adriano (BRA) | 61.96 | São Leopoldo, Brazil | 21 May 1998 |
| European record | Gabriele Reinsch (GDR) | 76.80 | Neubrandenburg, East Germany | 7 July 1988 |
| Oceanian record | Daniela Costian (AUS) | 68.72 | Auckland, New Zealand | 22 January 1994 |

== Qualification standards ==
| A standard | B standard |
|---|---|
| 62.00 m | 58.50 m |

== Schedule ==
| Date | Time | Round |
|---|---|---|
| August 19, 2009 | 10:10 | Qualification |
| August 21, 2009 | 20:20 | Final |

== Results ==
=== Qualification ===
Qualification: Qualifying Performance 61.50 (Q) or at least 12 best performers (q) advance to the final.

| Rank | Group | Athlete | Nationality | #1 | #2 | #3 | Result | Notes |
|---|---|---|---|---|---|---|---|---|
| 1 | A | Ma Xuejun | China | 63.38 | | | 63.38 | Q, SB |
| 2 | B | Song Aimin | China | x | 62.80 | | 62.80 | Q |
| 3 | B | Dani Samuels | Australia | 62.67 | | | 62.67 | Q |
| 4 | B | Żaneta Glanc | Poland | 49.79 | 62.43 | | 62.43 | Q |
| 5 | A | Yarelis Barrios | Cuba | x | x | 62.19 | 62.19 | Q |
| 6 | A | Sandra Perković | Croatia | 61.02 | x | 62.16 | 62.16 | Q |
| 7 | B | Natalya Sadova | Russia | 61.94 | | | 61.94 | Q |
| 8 | A | Nicoleta Grasu | Romania | 60.25 | 61.78 | | 61.78 | Q |
| 9 | A | Nadine Müller | Germany | 61.63 | | | 61.63 | Q |
| 10 | B | Mélina Robert-Michon | France | 58.36 | 61.53 | | 61.53 | Q |
| 11 | A | Stephanie Brown Trafton | United States | 60.15 | 57.44 | 61.23 | 61.23 | q |
| 12 | B | Aretha Thurmond | United States | 60.09 | 59.09 | 61.08 | 61.08 | q |
| 13 | B | Xu Shaoyang | China | 59.67 | 61.02 | 57.96 | 61.02 | SB |
| 14 | B | Yarisley Collado | Cuba | 59.56 | 59.23 | 60.37 | 60.37 | |
| 15 | B | Seema Antil | India | 59.85 | x | x | 59.85 | SB |
| 16 | A | Elizna Naudé | South Africa | 59.46 | 59.46 | 59.67 | 59.67 | SB |
| 17 | A | Wioletta Potępa | Poland | x | 59.54 | x | 59.54 | |
| 18 | B | Věra Pospíšilová-Cechlová | Czech Republic | 57.87 | 58.37 | 59.52 | 59.52 | |
| 19 | A | Dragana Tomašević | Serbia | 58.32 | 59.30 | 59.38 | 59.38 | |
| 20 | A | Svetlana Ivanova-Saykina | Russia | 59.31 | x | 58.45 | 59.31 | |
| 21 | B | Joanna Wiśniewska | Poland | x | 58.85 | x | 58.85 | |
| 22 | A | Becky Breisch | United States | 58.50 | x | 58.08 | 58.50 | |
| 23 | B | Franka Dietzsch | Germany | x | x | 58.44 | 58.44 | |
| 24 | B | Vera Begić | Croatia | 54.63 | x | 58.25 | 58.25 | |
| 25 | A | Yania Ferrales | Cuba | 57.71 | 55.84 | 58.24 | 58.24 | |
| 26 | B | Anna Söderberg | Sweden | 56.38 | 57.92 | x | 57.92 | |
| 27 | A | Kateryna Karsak | Ukraine | 56.79 | x | x | 56.79 | |
| 28 | A | Krishna Poonia | India | x | x | 56.75 | 56.75 | |
| 29 | A | Elisângela Adriano | Brazil | 54.99 | 52.00 | 55.75 | 55.75 | |
| 30 | B | Rocío Comba | Argentina | 52.62 | 54.69 | x | 54.69 | |
| 31 | B | Zinaida Sendriute | Lithuania | 52.85 | 54.55 | x | 54.55 | |
| 32 | A | Sofia Larsson | Sweden | 51.87 | x | 54.28 | 54.28 | |
| 33 | A | Olena Antonova | Ukraine | x | 54.28 | x | 54.28 | |
| 34 | B | Li Wen-Hua | Chinese Taipei | 53.88 | 49.91 | 52.49 | 53.88 | |
| 35 | B | Kazai Suzanne Kragbé | Ivory Coast | 52.24 | 53.84 | 52.79 | 53.84 | NR |
| 36 | A | Venera Getova | Bulgaria | 53.33 | x | x | 53.33 | |
| 37 | B | Tereapii Tapoki | Cook Islands | x | 45.29 | x | 45.29 | SB |
| | A | Ellina Zvereva | Belarus | x | x | x | NM | |
| | B | Iryna Yatchenko | Belarus | x | x | x | NM | |
| | B | Natalya Fokina-Semenova | Ukraine | | | | DNS | |

=== Final ===
| Rank | Athlete | Nationality | #1 | #2 | #3 | #4 | #5 | #6 | Result | Notes |
|---|---|---|---|---|---|---|---|---|---|---|
| 1st place, gold medalist(s) | Dani Samuels | Australia | x | 59.05 | 62.71 | 64.76 | 65.44 | x | 65.44 | PB |
| 2nd place, silver medalist(s) | Yarelis Barrios | Cuba | 64.44 | 63.87 | 61.17 | x | x | 65.31 | 65.31 | SB |
| 3rd place, bronze medalist(s) | Nicoleta Grasu | Romania | x | 65.20 | 62.38 | 60.68 | 63.41 | x | 65.20 | SB |
| 4 | Zaneta Glanc | Poland | 58.69 | 59.83 | 62.66 | x | 57.71 | x | 62.66 | |
| 5 | Song Aimin | China | 51.69 | 60.50 | 61.78 | x | 61.39 | 62.42 | 62.42 | |
| 6 | Nadine Müller | Germany | 57.53 | 57.62 | 62.04 | 60.40 | x | x | 62.04 | |
| 7 | Natalya Sadova | Russia | 60.70 | 61.78 | 59.31 | 60.44 | 58.26 | 61.44 | 61.78 | |
| 8 | Mélina Robert-Michon | France | 59.80 | 60.92 | 60.89 | x | 59.90 | 59.69 | 60.92 | |
| 9 | Sandra Perković | Croatia | x | 60.77 | x | | | | 60.77 | |
| 10 | Aretha Thurmond | United States | x | 59.89 | 59.88 | | | | 59.89 | |
| 11 | Ma Xuejun | China | 58.79 | x | 58.58 | | | | 58.79 | |
| 12 | Stephanie Brown Trafton | United States | 58.53 | x | 57.94 | | | | 58.53 | |
