= Zinaida Sendriūtė =

Lithuanian discus thrower

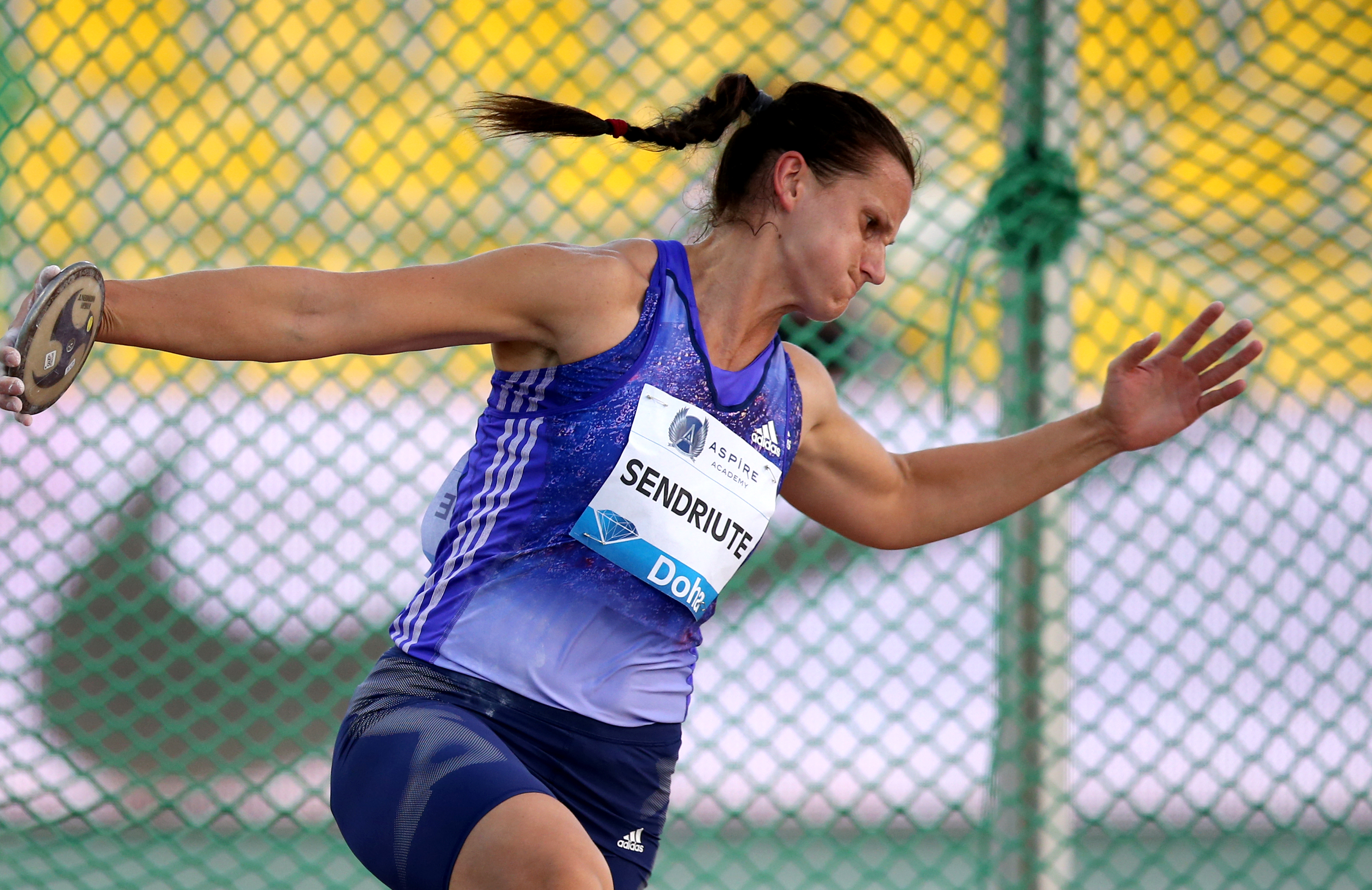
- Zinaida Sendriūtė in 2015

Personal information
- Height: 1.88 m (6 ft 2 in)
- Weight: 94 kg (207 lb)

Sport
- Country: Lithuania
- Sport: Athletics
- Event: Discus
- Club: LSU, Kaunas
- Updated on 14 August 2012

Zinaida Sendriūtė is a Lithuanian discus thrower. Her personal best is 65.97 metres, achieved in May 2013 in Kaunas.

She competed at the 2006 European Championships, 2008 Olympic Games and 2009 World Championships without reaching the final.

In 2021 she was still competing at a high level.

== Achievements ==
Year	Competition	Venue	Position	Notes
Representing Lithuania
2003	European Junior Championships	Tampere, Finland	7th	47.12 m
2005	European U23 Championships	Erfurt, Germany	6th	52.78 m
2006	European Championships	Gothenburg, Sweden	18th (q)	53.22 m
2008	Olympic Games	Beijing, China	33rd (q)	54.81 m
2009	Universiade	Belgrade, Serbia	7th	55.65 m
2009	World Championships	Berlin, Germany	31st (q)	54.55 m
2010	European Championships	Barcelona, Spain	5th	60.70 m
2011	Universiade	Shenzhen, China	2nd	62.49 m
2011	World Championships	Daegu, South Korea	12th	57.30 m
2012	European Championships	Helsinki, Finland	17th (q)	53.97 m
2012	Olympic Games	London, United Kingdom	8th	61.68 m
2013	World Championships	Moscow, Russia	9th	62.54 m
2014	European Championships	Zurich, Switzerland	6th	60.65 m
2015	World Championships	Beijing, China	13th (q)	60.33 m
2016	European Championships	Amsterdam, Netherlands	13th	56.17 m
2016	Olympic Games	Rio de Janeiro, Brazil	10th	61.89 m
2017	World Championships	London, United Kingdom	12th (q)	61.48 m^{1}

^{1}No mark in the final
