= 2002 World Junior Championships in Athletics – Women's discus throw =

The women's discus throw event at the 2002 World Junior Championships in Athletics was held in Kingston, Jamaica, at National Stadium on 18 and 19 July.

== Medalists ==
Gold	Ma Xuejun; China
Silver	Xu Shaoyang; China
Bronze	Seema Antil; India

== Results ==
=== Final ===
19 July

Rank	Name	Nationality	Attempts						Result	Notes
Rank	Name	Nationality	1	2	3	4	5	6	Result	Notes
1st place, gold medalist(s)	Ma Xuejun	China	56.83	57.69	56.91	58.85	53.27	57.49	58.85	
2nd place, silver medalist(s)	Xu Shaoyang	China	55.70	x	53.90	55.87	57.14	57.87	57.87	
3rd place, bronze medalist(s)	Seema Antil	India	54.99	54.26	x	55.83	53.75	53.20	55.83	
4	Sabine Rumpf	Germany	x	54.82	x	52.55	49.14	54.45	54.82	
5	Billie Jo Grant	United States	52.66	49.97	x	48.09	x	49.05	52.66	
6	Claudia Villeneuve	France	45.09	51.01	x	49.43	52.13	x	52.13	
7	Ulrike Giesa	Germany	47.53	51.99	49.89	49.80	50.08	47.71	51.99	
8	Darya Pishchalnikova	Russia	x	43.70	51.03	49.87	50.71	51.98	51.98	
9	Claire Smithson	United Kingdom	50.85	x	48.03				50.85	
10	Katalin Máté	Hungary	46.67	x	48.38				48.38	
11	Alina Roman	Romania	46.94	48.12	47.63				48.12	
12	Yeh Nai-Ching	Chinese Taipei	35.57	44.30	x				44.30	

=== Qualifications ===
18 Jul

==== Group A ====
Rank	Name	Nationality	Attempts			Result	Notes
Rank	Name	Nationality	1	2	3	Result	Notes
1	Sabine Rumpf	Germany	54.15	-	-	54.15	Q
2	Seema Antil	India	53.61	-	-	53.61	Q
3	Ma Xuejun	China	53.21	-	-	53.21	Q
4	Xu Shaoyang	China	x	52.52	-	52.52	Q
5	Darya Pishchalnikova	Russia	50.95	-	-	50.95	Q
6	Ulrike Giesa	Germany	48.69	-	-	48.69	Q
7	Claudia Villeneuve	France	x	47.73	47.68	47.73	q
8	Billie Jo Grant	United States	x	47.60	x	47.60	q
9	Katalin Máté	Hungary	46.99	44.92	43.46	46.99	q
10	Claire Smithson	United Kingdom	40.35	40.59	44.98	44.98	q
11	Alina Roman	Romania	41.42	x	44.77	44.77	q
12	Yeh Nai-Ching	Chinese Taipei	x	43.73	39.81	43.73	q
13	Dorothéa Kalpakídou	Greece	x	x	43.66	43.66	
14	Natalee Pessoa	Jamaica	x	37.44	39.68	39.68	
15	Tereapii Tapoki	Cook Islands	35.77	x	36.75	36.75	
	Nicole Kendrick	United States	x	x	x	NM	

== Participation ==
According to an unofficial count, 16 athletes from 13 countries participated in the event.

- China (2)
- Chinese Taipei (1)
- Cook Islands (1)
- France (1)
- Germany (2)
- Greece (1)
- Hungary (1)
- India (1)
- Jamaica (1)
- Romania (1)
- Russia (1)
- United Kingdom (1)
- United States (2)
