= Sofia Larsson =

Swedish discus thrower

Personal information
- Born: 22 July 1988 (age 37)
- Height: 1.74 m (5 ft 9 in)
- Weight: 82 kg (181 lb)

Sport
- Sport: Athletics
- Event: Discus throw
- Club: IF Göta

Sofia Larsson (born 22 July 1988) is a Swedish athlete specialising in the discus throw. She represented her country at the 2009 World Championships without qualifying for the final. Early in her career she competed in the 100 metres hurdles.

Her personal best in the event is 59.25 metres set in Södertälje in 2015.

== International competitions ==
Year	Competition	Venue	Position	Event	Notes
Representing Sweden
2007	European Junior Championships	Hengelo, Netherlands	13th (q)	Discus throw	45.91 m
2009	European U23 Championships	Kaunas, Lithuania	4th	Discus throw	53.74 m
2009	World Championships	Berlin, Germany	32nd (q)	Discus throw	54.28 m
2010	European Championships	Barcelona, Spain	17th (q)	Discus throw	54.50 m
2014	European Championships	Zürich, Switzerland	11th	Discus throw	51.81 m
2016	European Championships	Amsterdam, Netherlands	16th (q)	Discus throw	56.02 m
