= Kirill Pishchalnikov =

Russian basketball player

Kirill Vitalyevich Pishchalnikov (Russian: Кирилл Витальевич Пищальников; born June 29, 1987 in Astrakhan, Russian SFSR, Soviet Union) is a Russian professional basketball player. He plays the power forward position. His height is 6'8″ and his weight is 265 lb.)

== College ==
Kirill played at Virginia Commonwealth University for three seasons (2007-2010). In the first two years Pishchalnikov helped the VCU Rams to consecutive regular season conference titles in the Colonial Athletic Association. In 2009 the VCU Rams also won the CAA tournament advancing the team to the NCAA tournament. VCU played against the UCLA Bruins in the first round and were unable to advance, losing by only one point.

== Professional career ==
Kirill's professional career began in September, 2010 signing with BC Spartak Saint Petersburg of the Russian Professional Basketball League.

In October 2011 Kirill signed with BK Ataman
