= Yarelys Barrios =

Cuban discus thrower (born 1983)

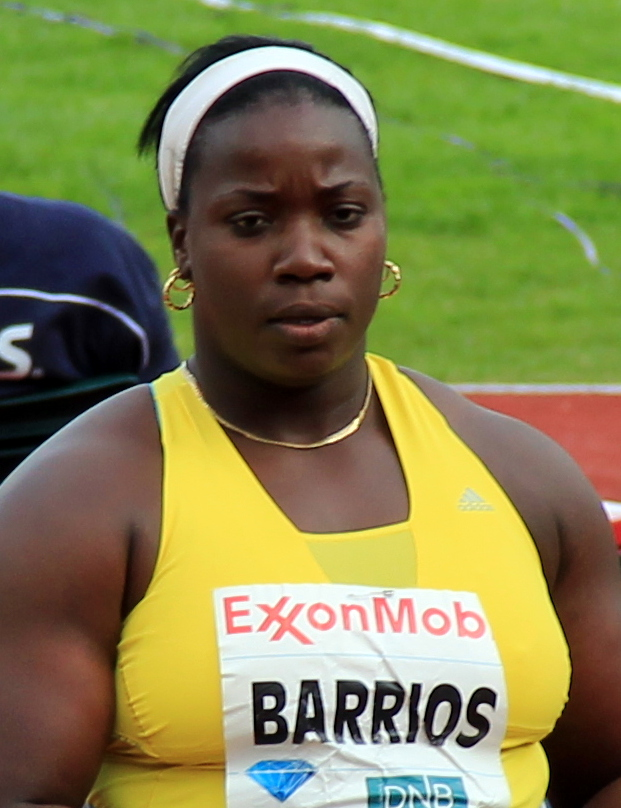
- Barrios at the 2012 Bislett Games

Personal information
- Full name: Yarelis Barrios Castañeda
- Born: July 12, 1983 (age 43) Pinar del Río, Cuba
- Height: 1.72 m (5 ft 8 in)
- Weight: 89 kg (196 lb)

Sport
- Country: Cuba
- Sport: Athletics
- Event: Discus
Medal record
Representing Cuba
Olympic Games
Bronze medal – third place	2012 London	Discus throw
Disqualified	2008 Beijing	Discus throw
World Championships
Silver medal – second place	2007 Osaka	Discus throw
Silver medal – second place	2009 Berlin	Discus throw
Bronze medal – third place	2011 Daegu	Discus throw
Bronze medal – third place	2013 Moscow	Discus throw
Pan American Games
Gold medal – first place	2007 Rio de Janeiro	Discus throw
Gold medal – first place	2011 Guadalajara	Discus throw
Universiade
Gold medal – first place	2007 Bangkok	Discus throw

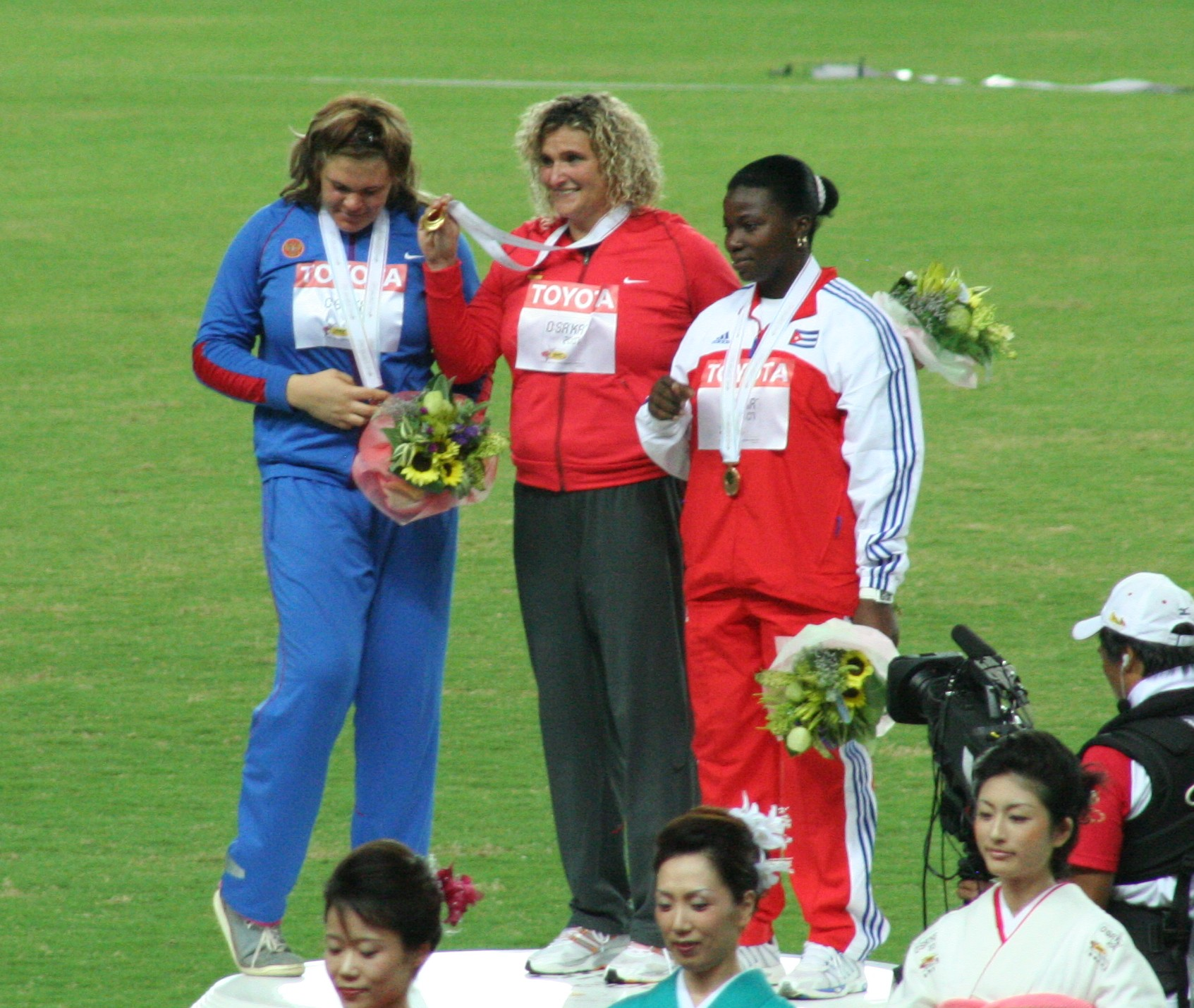
Barrios (right) at the 2007 World Championships

Yarelys Barrios Castañeda (also Yarelis Barrios Castañeda; born July 12, 1983) is a Cuban discus thrower.

== Career ==
She won the Diamond Race in the women's discus throw of the IAAF Diamond League both in 2010 and in 2011.

She won the 2012 Cuban National Championships with a personal best throw of 68.03 metres.

Barrios finished the Olympic discus competition in 2008 in the second place, but was disqualified by the IOC on September 1, 2016, because of doping due to a sample reanalysis which resulted in a positive test for the prohibited substance Acetazolamide.

Barrios sold her Olympic silver medal on auction site, eBay, for unknown reasons, and it was bought for $11,000 (£9,000).

== Achievements ==
Year	Competition	Venue	Position	Event	Notes
Representing Cuba
2005	ALBA Games	Havana, Cuba	1st	Discus	60.41 m
2005	Central American and Caribbean Championships	Nassau, Bahamas	1st	Discus	56.59 m
2006	Central American and Caribbean Games	Cartagena, Colombia	2nd	Discus	58.22 m
2007	World Championships	Osaka, Japan	2nd	Discus	63.90 m (=PB)
2007	Pan American Games	Rio de Janeiro, Brazil	1st	Discus	61.72 m
2007	Universiade	Bangkok, Thailand	1st	Discus	61.36 m
2008	Central American and Caribbean Championships	Cali, Colombia	1st	Discus	62.87 m
2008	Olympic Games	Beijing, China	DSQ (2nd)	Discus	~~63.64 m~~
2009	ALBA Games	Havana, Cuba	2nd	Discus	63.24 m
2009	Central American and Caribbean Championships	Havana, Cuba	1st	Discus	62.10 m
2009	World Championships	Berlin, Germany	2nd	Discus	65.31 m
2010	Ibero-American Championships	San Fernando, Spain	2nd	Discus	59.96 m
2010	Continental Cup	Split, Croatia	3rd	Discus	62.58 m
2011	World Championships	Daegu, South Korea	3rd	Discus	65.73 m
2011	Pan American Games	Guadalajara, Mexico	1st	Discus	66.40 m
2012	Olympic Games	London, United Kingdom	3rd	Discus	66.38 m
2013	World Championships	Moscow, Russia	3rd	Discus	64.96 m

- Barrios originally finished 4th in the 2012 Summer Olympics, but she moved up a position after Darya Pishchalnikova was disqualified for testing positive for the anabolic steroid oxandrolone.
