= Dorothea Kalpakidou =

Greek discus thrower

Personal information
- Nationality: Greece
- Born: 21 September 1983 (age 42) Serres, Greece
- Height: 1.86 m (6 ft 1 in)
- Weight: 70 kg (154 lb)

Sport
- Sport: Athletics
- Event: Discus throw

Achievements and titles
- Personal best: Discus throw: 59.78 m (2010)

Dorothea Kalpakidou (Greek: Δωροθέα Καλπακίδου; born September 21, 1983, in Serres) is a female Greek discus thrower. Kalpakidou represented Greece at the 2008 Summer Olympics in Beijing, where she competed in the women's discus throw. She placed thirty-fifth in the qualifying rounds with a throw of 53.00 metres, failing to advance into the final.
