= Darya Pishchalnikova =

Russian discus thrower

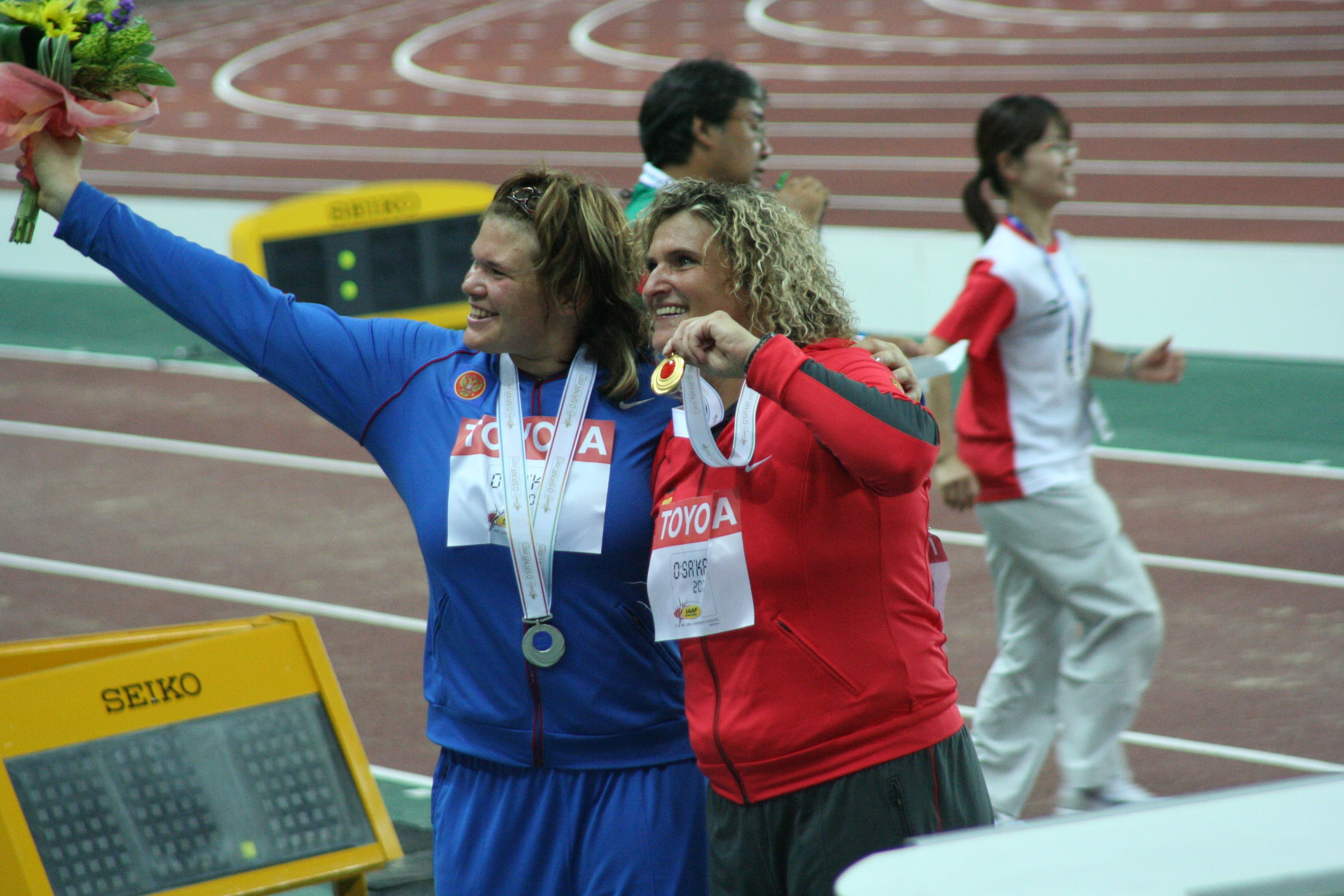
- Pishchalnikova (left) with Franka Dietzsch at the 2007 World Championships in Osaka

Personal information
- Full name: Дарья Витальевна Пищальникова
- Nationality: Russian
- Born: July 19, 1985 (age 40) Astrakhan, Russian SFSR, Soviet Union
- Years active: 2000–present
- Height: 1.89 m (6 ft 2 in)
- Weight: 95 kg (209 lb)

Sport
- Sport: Athletics
- Event: Discus throw

Achievements and titles
- Personal best: discus – 65.55 m (2006)
Medal record
Representing Russia
Olympic Games
Disqualified	2012 London	Discus throw
- Updated on 14 August 2009

Darya Vitalyevna Pishchalnikova (Russian: Дарья Витальевна Пищальникова, born 19 July 1985 in Astrakhan) is a female, former discus thrower from Russia. Pishchalnikova is the sister of Bogdan Pishchalnikov and Kirill Pishchalnikov.

== Career ==
Pishchalnikova rose through the ranks as a young athlete, winning the silver medal in the discus at the 2001 World Youth Championships in Athletics, then repeating that feat at the World Junior Championships in 2004. She established herself as one of the top women's throwers at the 2006 European Athletics Championships, taking the gold medal with a throw of 65.55 metres, which remains her personal best.

She set a personal best throw of 65.78 metres when she won the silver medal at the 2007 World Championships in Osaka, but that throw was to be subsequently discredited. She was selected to represent Russia at the 2008 Summer Olympics in Beijing, but on 31 July, she was suspended from competition due to doping test irregularities, along with several other high-profile Russian female athletes. On 20 October 2008, it was announced that Pishchalnikova was one of seven Russian athletes receiving a two-year doping ban for manipulating drug samples.

She returned to competition in 2011 and finished eleventh at the World Championships in Daegu that year. She took second place at the 2012 European Cup Winter Throwing, then had a personal best throw of 67.00 m in Adler in May. At the Prefontaine Classic Diamond League meeting she was runner-up to Sandra Perković. She won the Russian Championships with a throw of 70.69 m – the best performance in the event since 1992.

Pishchalnikova participated in the 2012 Olympics and was awarded a silver medal. However, she tested positive for the anabolic steroid oxandrolone in the samples taken in May 2012. In April 2013 she was banned by the Russian Athletics Federation for ten years, and her results from May 2012 were annulled, meaning she was set on track to lose her Olympic medal. According to The New York Times, she was a whistleblower who sent the World Anti-Doping Agency (WADA) a December 2012 email detailing state-run doping programs in which Russian athletes had to participate; her ban by the Russian Athletics Federation was likely in retaliation.

== Achievements ==
Year	Competition	Venue	Position	Notes
Representing Russia
2001	World Youth Championships	Debrecen, Hungary	2nd	49.37 m
2002	World Junior Championships	Kingston, Jamaica	8th	51.98 m
2004	World Junior Championships	Grosseto, Italy	2nd	57.37 m
2005	European U23 Championships	Erfurt, Germany	2nd	59.45 m
2005	Universiade	İzmir, Turkey	6th	57.52 m
2006	European Championships	Gothenburg, Sweden	1st	65.55 m = PB
2006	World Cup	Athens, Greece	4th	61.39 m
2007	European U23 Championships	Debrecen, Hungary	DQ (2nd)	DQ (64.15 m)
2007	World Championships	Osaka, Japan	DQ (2nd)	DQ (65.78 m) was PB
2011	World Championships	Daegu, South Korea	11th	58.10 m
2012	Olympics	London, United Kingdom	DQ (2nd)	DQ (67.56 m)
