= Nadine Müller (athlete) =

German discus thrower

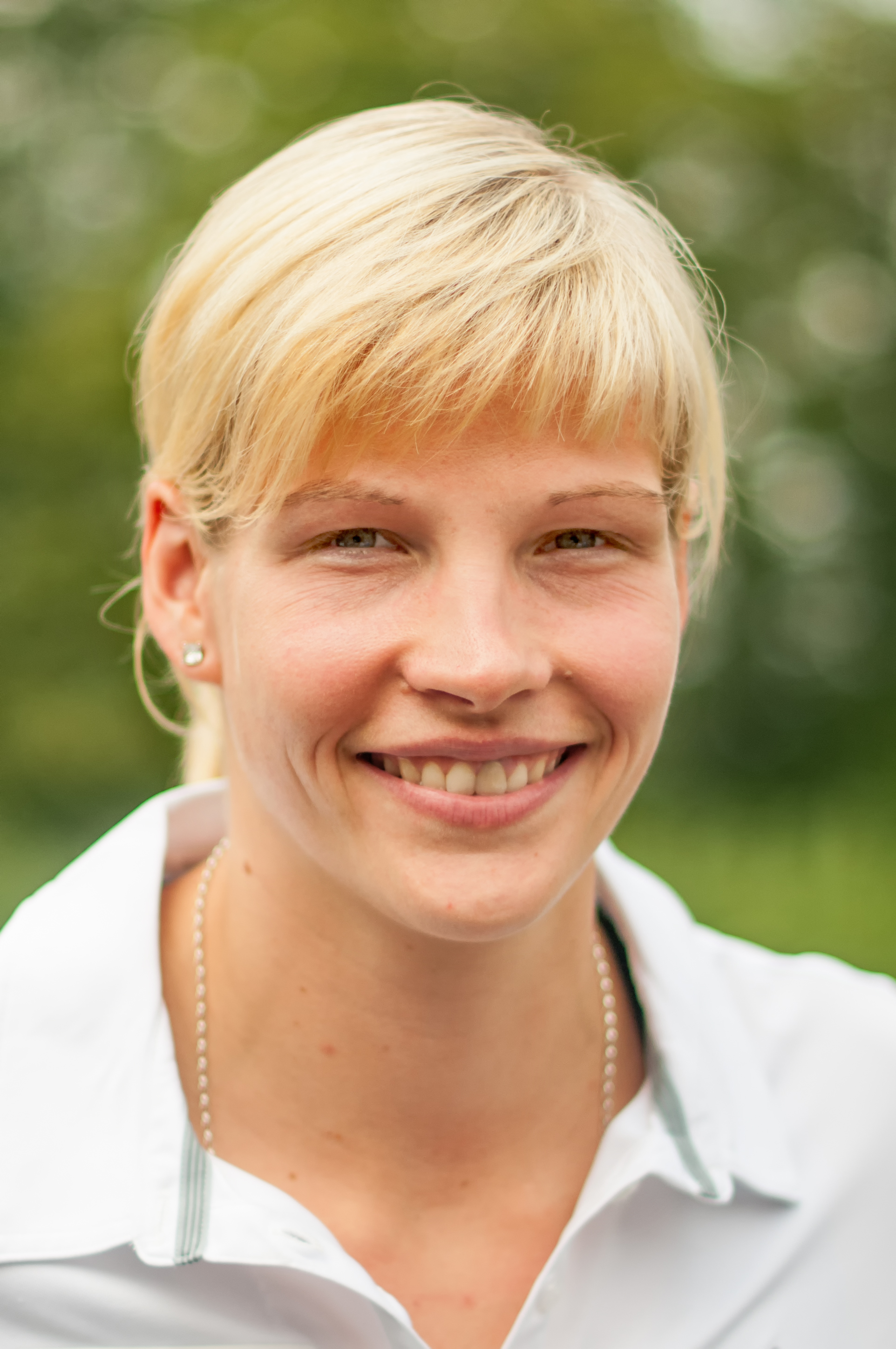
- Müller 2012

Personal information
- Full name: Nadine Müller
- Nationality: German
- Born: 21 November 1985 (age 40) Leipzig, East Germany
- Height: 1.93 m (6 ft 4 in)
- Weight: 90 kg (198 lb)

Sport
- Sport: Track and field
- Event: Discus throw
- Club: SC DHfK Leipzig
Medal record
World Championships
Silver medal – second place	2011 Daegu	Discus throw
Bronze medal – third place	2015 Beijing	Discus throw
European Championships
Silver medal – second place	2012 Helsinki	Discus throw
Silver medal – second place	2018 Berlin	Discus throw
European Cup Winter Throwing
Gold medal – first place	2013 Leiria	Discus throw
World Junior Championships
Bronze medal – third place	2004 Grosseto	Discus throw
European Junior Championships
Silver medal – second place	2003 Tampere	Discus throw
- Updated on 11 August 2018

Nadine Müller (born 21 November 1985) is a German discus thrower.

She was born in Leipzig. As a teenager, she won the silver medal at the 2003 European Junior Championships and the bronze medal at the 2004 World Junior Championships. Her personal best throw as a junior was 57.85 metres, achieved in May 2004 in Wiesbaden.

She improved gradually to 59.35 metres in May 2005 and 62.93 metres in May 2007, both in Halle. She competed at the 2007 World Championships, but without reaching the final. In May 2009 she improved to 63.46 metres in a meet in Wiesbaden. She finished fourth at the 2009 European Team Championships, Super League, and sixth at the 2009 World Championships.

She started the 2010 season well by setting a new personal best – having already won gold at the 2010 European Cup Winter Throwing competition, she used her last throw of the contest to push her limits and threw a best of 64.30 m. She threw even further a few months later, winning the 15th Throwers Cup in Wiesbaden with a world leading mark of 67.78 m.

== Personal life ==
Nadine Müller married her partner Sabine in a civil union on New Year's Eve 2013.

== Achievements ==
Year	Competition	Venue	Position	Notes
2003	European Junior Championships	Tampere, Finland	2nd	53.44 m
2004	World Junior Championships	Grosseto, Italy	3rd	57.13 m
2007	European Cup Winter Throwing	Yalta, Ukraine	1st	60.35 m
2007	European U23 Championships	Debrecen, Hungary	8th	51.04 m
2007	World Championships	Osaka, Japan	11th (q)	55.98 m
2009	European Cup Winter Throwing	Puerto de la Cruz, Spain	6th	57.40 m
2009	European Team Championships	Leiria, Portugal	4th	59.53 m
2009	World Championships	Berlin, Germany	6th	62.04 m
2010	European Cup Winter Throwing	Arles, France	1st	64.30 m
2010	European Championships	Barcelona, Spain	8th	57.78 m
2011	World Championships	Daegu, South Korea	2nd	65.97 m
2012	European Championships	Helsinki, Finland	2nd	65.41 m
2013	World Championships	Moscow, Russia	4th	64.67 m
2015	World Championships	Beijing, China	3rd	65.53 m
2016	European Championships	Amsterdam, Netherlands	4th	62.63 m
2016	Olympic Games	Rio de Janeiro, Brazil	6th	63.13 m
2017	World Championships	London, United Kingdom	6th	64.13 m
2018	European Championships	Berlin, Germany	2nd	63.00 m
2019	World Championships	Doha, Qatar	8th	61.55 m

Sporting positions
Preceded by (China) Li Yanfeng	Women's Discus Best Year Performance; 2010	Succeeded by (China) Li Yanfeng
