= Żaneta Glanc =

Polish discus thrower (born 1983)

Personal information
- Nationality: Poland
- Born: 11 March 1983 (age 43) Poznań, Poland
- Height: 1.86 m (6 ft 1 in)
- Weight: 95 kg (209 lb) (2012)

Sport
- Sport: Athletics
- Event: Discus throw
- Club: AZS Poznan
Medal record
Women's athletics
Representing Poland
European Team Championships
Silver medal – second place	2015 Cheboksary	Discus
Bronze medal – third place	2011 Stockholm	Discus
Bronze medal – third place	2013 Gateshead	Discus
Universiade
Gold medal – first place	2011 Shenzhen	Discus
Silver medal – second place	2009 Belgrade	Discus

Żaneta Glanc (born 11 March 1983 in Poznań) is a female discus thrower from Poland.

She finished fourth at the 2009 World Championships and second at the 2009 World Athletics Final. She won the silver medal at the 2009 Summer Universiade. She also competed at the 2008 Olympic Games, but recorded no mark. At the 2012 Olympic Games, she threw 59.88 but did not reach the final.

Her personal best is 65.34 metres, achieved in May 2012 in Halle.

== Competition record ==
Year	Competition	Venue	Position	Notes
Representing Poland
2005	European U23 Championships	Erfurt, Germany	18th (q)	46.24 m
2007	European Cup Winter Throwing	Yalta, Ukraine	6th	52.87 m
2008	Olympic Games	Beijing, China	–	NM
2009	Universiade	Belgrade, Serbia	2nd	60.57 m
2009	World Championships	Berlin, Germany	4th	62.66 m
2010	European Cup Winter Throwing	Arles, France	2nd	59.95 m
2011	Universiade	Shenzhen, China	1st	63.99 m (PB)
2011	World Championships	Daegu, South Korea	4th	63.91 m
2012	Olympic Games	London, United Kingdom	24th (q)	59.88 m
2013	World Championships	Moscow, Russia	7th	62.90 m
2016	Olympic Games	Rio de Janeiro, Brazil	17th (q)	57.88 m
