= Aretha Thurmond =

American discus thrower (born 1976)

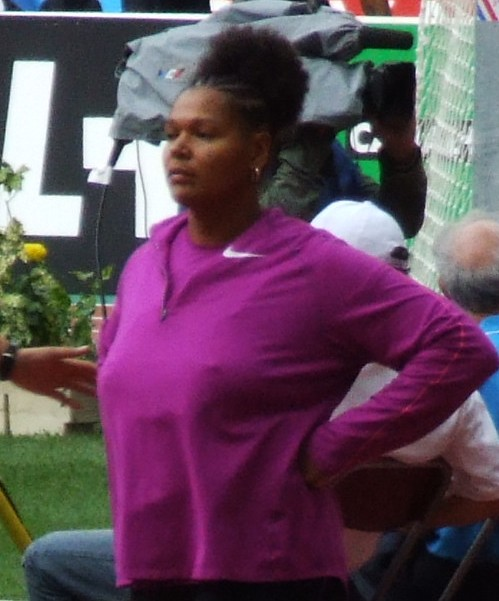
- Thurmond at the 2010 Meeting Areva

Personal information
- Born: Aretha Hill; August 14, 1976 (age 50) Seattle, Washington, U.S.
- Education: University of Washington
- Height: 1.78 m (5 ft 10 in)
- Weight: 107 kg (236 lb)

Sport
- Country: United States
- Sport: Athletics
- Event: Discus
Medal record
Pan American Games
Gold medal – first place	1999 Winnipeg	Discus throw
Gold medal – first place	2003 Santo Domingo	Discus throw
Silver medal – second place	2011 Guadalajara	Discus throw
- Updated on August 14, 2012

Aretha Thurmond, née Hill (born August 14, 1976) is an American discus thrower. Her personal best distance is 65.86 metres (216.1 ft), achieved in March 2004 in Marietta.

Thurmond is a 1994 graduate of Renton High School and in 1998 she graduated from the University of Washington with a bachelor's degree in sociology.

Thurmond is currently employed with USA Track & Field as the managing director of International Teams.

== College career ==
Thurmond was a member of the track team at the University of Washington 1995–98.She was a discus thrower. During her time she set many collegiate records. Her records include ones in the Pac-10 Conference. She was also a four-time NCAA All-American.

== Personal life ==
She is married to the former University of Washington throws coach, Reedus Thurmond. They have one son together. His name is Theo.

Aretha Thurmond never strayed away from the sport. She resides in Indianapolis with her family. Since she is working for USA Track & Field, Thurmond earned her Executive Masters in Sport Organization Management.

== International competitions ==
Year	Competition	Venue	Position	Notes
Representing the United States
1996	Olympic Games	Atlanta, United States	34th (q)	56.04 m
1999	Pan American Games	Winnipeg, Canada	1st	59.06 m
2003	Pan American Games	Santo Domingo, Dominican Republic	1st	63.30 m
2003	World Athletics Final	Monte Carlo, Monaco	2nd	
2004	Olympic Games	Athens, Greece	19th (q)	58.82 m
2004	World Athletics Final	Monte Carlo, Monaco	3rd	63.43 m
2005	World Athletics Final	Monte Carlo, Monaco	3rd	
2006	World Athletics Final	Stuttgart, Germany	5th	
2006	World Cup	Athens, Greece	2nd	
2009	World Championships	Berlin, Germany	10th	59.89 m
2011	Pan American Games	Guadalajara, Mexico	2nd	59.53 m
2012	Olympic Games	London, United Kingdom	25th (q)	59.39 m
