= Valentina Aniballi =

Italian discus thrower

Personal information
- Nationality: Italian
- Born: 18 April 1984 (age 42) Rieti
- Height: 1.76 m (5 ft 9 in)
- Weight: 85 kg (187 lb)

Sport
- Country: Italy
- Sport: Athletics
- Event: Discus throw
- Club: G.S. Esercito
- Coached by: Roberto Casciani

Achievements and titles
- Personal best: Discus throw: 59.12 m (2018)

Valentina Aniballi (born 18 April 1984) is an Italian female Discus thrower, that won four national championships and at the end of season 2015, with the measure of 58.55 m, had reached the 60th place in the world lists.

== Biography ==
She participated at the 2014 European Athletics Championships (13th) and 2016 European Athletics Championships (25th) in both cases she failed to qualify to the final.

== Personal best ==
- Discus throw: 59.12 m - (Italy) Tarquinia, 13 June 2018

== National titles ==
- Italian Athletics Championships
  - Discus throw: 2013, 2014, 2018
- Italian Winter Throwing Championships
  - Discus throw: 2013, 2017, 2018

== See also ==
- Italian all-time lists - Discus throw
