= Hanna Mazgunova =

Belarusian discus thrower

Personal information
- Nationality: Belarus
- Born: 4 June 1985 (age 41) Yelsk, Gomel, Byelorussian SSR, Soviet Union (now Belarus)
- Height: 1.81 m (5 ft 11 1/2 in)
- Weight: 75 kg (165 lb)

Sport
- Sport: Athletics
- Event: Discus throw

Achievements and titles
- Personal best: Discus throw: 62.71 m (2008)

Hanna Mazgunova (Belarusian: Ганна Мазгунова; born June 4, 1985, in Yelsk, Gomel) is a Belarusian discus thrower. Mazgunova represented Belarus at the 2008 Summer Olympics in Beijing, where she competed for the women's discus throw, along with her compatriots Ellina Zvereva and Iryna Yatchenko. She performed the best throw of 56.77 metres in her third attempt, despite having received two fouls throughout the entire qualifying round. Mazgunova, however, failed to advance into the final, as she placed twenty-ninth out of thirty-eight athletes in the overall rankings.
