= 2011 World Youth Championships in Athletics – Girls' discus throw =

Girls' discus throw at the 2011 World Youth Championships in Athletics
- Venue: Stadium Lille Métropole
- Dates: 8 July (qualification); 9 July (final)
- Competitors: 37
- Winning distance: 53.51

Medalists
gold medal	Rosalía Vázquez	Cuba
silver medal	Liang Yan	China
bronze medal	Shelbi Vaughan	United States

The girls' discus throw at the 2011 World Youth Championships in Athletics was held at the Stadium Lille Métropole on 8 and 9 July.

== Medalists ==
Gold	Silver	Bronze
Rosalía Vázquez; Cuba	Liang Yan; China	Shelbi Vaughan; United States

== Records ==
Prior to the competition, the following records were as follows.

World Youth Best	Ilke Wyludda (GDR)	65.86	Neubrandenburg, East Germany	1 August 1986
Championship Record	Ma Xuejun (CHN)	55.26	Debrecen, Hungary	12 July 2001
World Youth Leading	Rosalía Vázquez (CUB)	54.00	Havana, Cuba	17 March 2011

== Qualification ==
Qualification rule: qualification standard 48.50 m or at least best 12 qualified.

=== Group A ===
Rank	Name	Nationality	#1	#2	#3	Result	Notes
1	Shelbi Vaughan	United States	53.78			53.78	Q, PB
2	Feng Bin	China	50.78			50.78	Q
3	Keshia McGrath-Volau	Australia	50.49			50.49	Q, PB
4	Katinka Urbaniak	Germany	44.19	x	47.56	47.56	q
5	Ifigenia Akrani	Greece	45.96	x	43.01	45.96	
6	Siositina Hakeai	New Zealand	x	45.76	x	45.76	
7	Tatyana Markova	Ukraine	45.51	45.59	x	45.59	
8	Subenrat Insaeng	Thailand	45.47	44.95	x	44.95	
9	Heini Järventausta	Finland	x	44.74	41.59	44.74	
10	María Belén Toimil	Spain	44.21	41.82	x	44.21	
11	Rahma Bouslama	Tunisia	43.29	x	44.14	44.14	PB
12	Maia Varela	Argentina	40.66	42.64	43.58	43.58	
13	Somari Els	South Africa	x	40.93	42.96	42.96	
14	Sarah Moss	Canada	x	40.79	x	40.79	
15	Júlia Kočárová	Czech Republic	x	39.64	40.61	40.61	
16	Lindsay Brena	France	37.47	38.91	x	38.91	
17	Shaunna Downey	South Africa	35.18	35.59	x	35.59	
	Milica Vukadinović	Montenegro	x	x	x	NM	

=== Group B ===
Rank	Name	Nationality	#1	#2	#3	Result	Notes
1	Natalya Shirobokova	Russia	x	52.03		52.03	Q
2	Rosalía Vázquez	Cuba	51.18			51.18	Q
3	Florentia Kalogeraki	Greece	44.36	x	51.15	51.15	Q
4	Filoi Aokuso	Australia	50.85			50.85	Q, PB
5	Liang Yan	China	50.77			50.77	Q
6	Karolina Makul	Poland	46.57	49.28		49.28	Q, PB
7	Viktoriya Savytska	Ukraine	x	47.91	48.50	48.50	Q, PB
8	Merewarihi Vaka	New Zealand	48.14	48.30	x	48.30	q
9	Ieva Zarankaitė	Lithuania	46.81	x	x	46.81	PB
10	Fadya El-Kasaby	Egypt	43.93	45.43	x	45.43	PB
11	Navjeet Kaur Dhillon	India	42.62	44.46	43.07	44.46	PB
12	Kätlin Piirimäe	Estonia	43.67	42.96	44.27	44.27	PB
13	Izabela da Silva	Brazil	x	43.98	x	43.98	PB
14	Rocío Aranda	Argentina	43.86	42.77	x	43.86	PB
15	Emma Ljungberg	Sweden	40.85	42.12	43.60	43.60	
16	Mona Ekroll Jaidi	Norway	42.99	x	43.21	43.21	
17	Maria Basile	Italy	x	39.12	x	39.12	
18	Chan Zhi Xuan	Singapore	37.32	x	x	37.32	
	Chamaya Turner	United States	x	x	x	NM	

== Final ==
Rank	Name	Nationality	#1	#2	#3	#4	#5	#6	Result	Notes
1st place, gold medalist(s)	Rosalía Vázquez	Cuba	51.95	x	48.92	53.51	50.44	50.41	53.51	
2nd place, silver medalist(s)	Liang Yan	China	39.72	51.69	x	52.89	50.97	52.28	52.89	PB
3rd place, bronze medalist(s)	Shelbi Vaughan	United States	52.58	x	50.76	x	52.23	x	52.58	
4	Feng Bin	China	x	48.07	49.29	51.16	x	51.25	51.25	
5	Filoi Aokuso	Australia	x	42.65	48.66	x	49.05	50.38	50.38	
6	Keshia McGrath-Volau	Australia	49.27	48.66	49.66	x	49.30	x	49.66	
7	Katinka Urbaniak	Germany	48.77	x	47.33	x	47.78	x	48.77	
8	Florentia Kalogeraki	Greece	48.38	46.19	47.12	46.54	x	46.93	48.38	
9	Merewarihi Vaka	New Zealand	47.32	x	x				47.32	
10	Karolina Makul	Poland	44.64	x	43.81				44.64	
11	Viktoriya Savytska	Ukraine	x	44.30	41.22				44.30	
12	Natalya Shirobokova	Russia	x	x	40.68				40.68	
