= Athletics at the 2026 Asian Games – Women's discus throw =

Women's discus throw at the 2026 Asian Games
- Venue: Mizuho Park Athletic Stadium, Nagoya
- Date: 28 September 2026
- Competitors: 8 from 5 nations

Medalists
gold medal	Feng Bin	China
silver medal	Jiang Zhichao	China
bronze medal	Subenrat Insaeng	Thailand

The women's discus throw competition at the 2026 Asian Games took place on 28 September 2026 at the Mizuho Park Athletic Stadium in Nagoya, Japan. Feng Bin of China won the gold medal, Jiang Zhichao of China won the silver, and Subenrat Insaeng of Thailand won the bronze.

== Schedule ==
All times are Japan Standard Time (UTC+09:00)

Schedule
Date	Time	Event
Monday, 28 September 2026	14:35	Final

== Records ==
Prior to this competition, the existing world, Asian and Games records were as follows.

World Record	Gabriele Reinsch (GDR)	76.80	Neubrandenburg, East Germany	6 September 1988
Asian Record	Xiao Yanling (CHN)	71.68	Beijing, China	13 March 1992
Games Record	Feng Bin (CHN)	67.93	Hangzhou, China	30 September 2023

== Results ==
Rank	Athlete	Attempt						Result	Notes
Rank	Athlete	1	2	3	4	5	6	Result	Notes
1st place, gold medalist(s)	Feng Bin (CHN)	63.69	61.76	X	62.70	63.40	63.83	63.83	
2nd place, silver medalist(s)	Jiang Zhichao (CHN)	55.68	51.49	X	62.25	60.32	56.27	62.25	SB
3rd place, bronze medalist(s)	Subenrat Insaeng (THA)	56.12	58.53	X	61.43	59.77	61.00	61.43	SB
4	Seema Kaliramna (IND)	53.67	58.40	58.18	56.89	59.88	59.81	59.88	PB
5	Nanaka Kori (JPN)	56.22	X	X	X	X	X	56.22	
6	Jeong Ye-lim (KOR)	7.47	X	X	54.88	54.59	55.28	55.28	
7	Shin Yu-jin (KOR)	51.35	52.02	51.64	X	50.21	51.73	52.02	
8	Sanya Yadav (IND)	X	49.90	X	48.30	48.18	43.02	49.90	
