= Kamalpreet Kaur =

Indian discus thrower (born 1996)

Personal information
- Full name: Kamalpreet Kaur Bal
- Born: 4 March 1996 (age 30) Malout, Punjab, India

Sport
- Sport: Athletics
- Event: Discus throw

Achievements and titles
- Personal bests: 66.59 m NR (2021)

Kamalpreet Kaur Bal (born 4 March 1996) is an Indian discus thrower. She is the first Indian woman to breach the 65 m barrier and holds the current national record of 66.59 m set in 2021. Kamalpreet represented India in the women's discus throw event at the 2020 Tokyo Olympics where she finished sixth in the finals.

On 12 October 2022, she was banned from competing for a period of three years by the AIU for a doping violation.

== Early and personal life ==
Kamalpreet hails from Kabarwala village near Malout in Punjab, India. She took up athletics in 2012 on the recommendation of her school physical education coach. From 2014, she began training more seriously and received her initial coaching at the Sports Authority of India centre near her village.

She completed her higher education at Punjabi University and is currently employed with the Indian Railways. Kamalpreet has cited Seema Punia as one of her inspirations and currently trains under coach Rakhi Tyagi. She has also stated an interest in cricket and has expressed aspirations of representing India in women's cricket.

== International competitions ==
Year	Competition	Venue	Position	Event	Notes
Representing India
2017	World University Games	Taipei Municipal Stadium, Taiwan	6th	Discus throw	55.07 m
2019	Asian Championships	Khalifa International Stadium, Qatar	5th	Discus throw	55.59 m
2021	Olympic Games	Japan National Stadium, Japan	6th	Discus throw	64.00 m
