= 2025 Asian Athletics Championships – Women's discus throw =

Women's discus throw at the 2025 Asian Athletics Championships
- Venue: Gumi Civic Stadium
- Location: Gumi, South Korea
- Dates: 29 May
- Competitors: 10 from 7 nations
- Winning distance: 61.90 m

Medalists
gold medal	Feng Bin	China
silver medal	Subenrat Insaeng	Thailand
bronze medal	Nanaka Kori	Japan

The women's discus throw event at the 2025 Asian Athletics Championships was held on 29 May.

== Records ==
Records before the 2025 Asian Athletics Championships
Record	Athlete (nation)	Distance (m)	Location	Date
World record	Gabriele Reinsch (GDR)	76.80	Neubrandenburg, East Germany	9 July 1988
Asian record	Xiao Yanling (CHN)	71.68	Beijing, China	14 March 1992
Championship record	Feng Bin (CHN)	66.42	Bangkok, Thailand	14 July 2023
World leading	Valarie Allman (USA)	73.52	Ramona, United States	12 April 2025
Asian leading	Wang Fang (CHN)	61.26	Chongqing, China	15 May 2025

== Schedule ==
The event schedule, in local time (UTC+9), was as follows:

Date	Time	Round
29 May	21:50	Final

== Results ==
Place	Athlete	Nation	#1	#2	#3	#4	#5	#6	Result	Notes
1st place, gold medalist(s)	Feng Bin	China	x	61.01	60.40	61.14	60.35	61.90	61.90 m	
2nd place, silver medalist(s)	Subenrat Insaeng	Thailand	53.39	57.68	x	55.57	x	x	57.68 m	
3rd place, bronze medalist(s)	Nanaka Kori	Japan	54.06	x	52.88	56.48	x	x	56.48 m	
4	Seema Kaliramna	India	55.35	56.15	x	53.89	54.20	55.12	56.15 m	
5	Jeong Yelim	South Korea	55.41	x	54.00	x	51.74	54.09	55.41 m	SB
6	Shin Yu-jin	South Korea	54.79	x	x	54.07	53.51	x	54.79 m	
7	Maki Saito	Japan	x	54.73	53.65	x	52.94	54.16	54.73 m	
8	Queenie Kung Ni Ting	Malaysia	44.40	x	47.21	47.96	47.22	x	47.96 m	
9	Daniela Daynata	Philippines	x	x	44.03				44.03 m	
—	Jiang Zhichao	China	x	x	x				NM	
