= Subenrat Insaeng =

Thai discus thrower (born 1994)

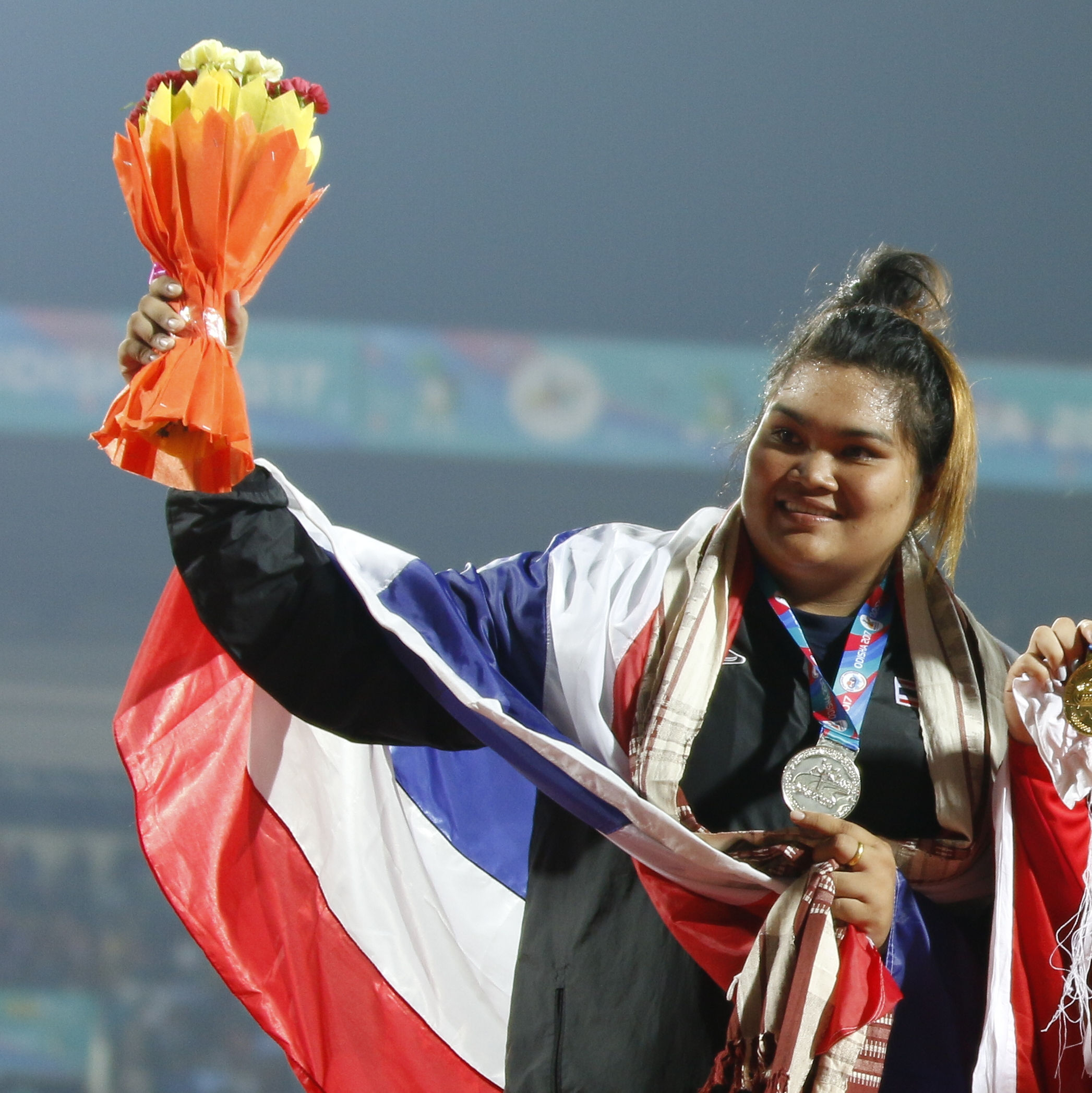
- Insaeng at the 2017 Asian Athletics Championships

Personal information
- Born: 10 February 1994 (age 32) Surat Thani, Thailand
- Education: Pathumthani University

Sport
- Country: Thailand
- Sport: Athletics
- Event: Discus throw

Achievements and titles
- Personal best: Discus throw: 61.97 m NR (Kolín 2018)
Medal record
Women's athletics
Representing Thailand
Asian Games
Bronze medal – third place	2026 Aichi–Nagoya	Discus throw
Asian Championships
Silver medal – second place	2017 Bhubaneswar	Discus throw
Silver medal – second place	2025 Gumi	Discus throw
Bronze medal – third place	2019 Doha	Discus throw
Bronze medal – third place	2023 Bangkok	Discus throw
SEA Games
Gold medal – first place	2011 Palembang	Discus throw
Gold medal – first place	2013 Naypyidaw	Discus throw
Gold medal – first place	2015 Singapore	Discus throw
Gold medal – first place	2017 Kuala Lumpur	Discus throw
Gold medal – first place	2019 Philippines	Discus throw
Gold medal – first place	2021 Hanoi	Discus throw
Gold medal – first place	2023 Phnom Penh	Discus throw
Gold medal – first place	2025 Bangkok	Discus throw
World University Games
Bronze medal – third place	2013 Kazan	Discus throw
Asian Junior Championships
Gold medal – first place	2012 Colombo	Discus throw
Silver medal – second place	2010 Hanoi	Discus throw
Asian Youth Games
Silver medal – second place	2009 Singapore	Discus throw

Subenrat Insaeng (Thai: สุเบญรัตน์ อินแสง; born 10 February 1994) is a Thai discus thrower. She is an eight-time consecutive SEA Games champion in the women's discus, having won every edition in which she competed from 2011 through 2025. She has also won four medals at the Asian Athletics Championships, including silver medals in 2017 and 2025, and won bronze at the 2026 Asian Games.

Insaeng represented Thailand at three consecutive Summer Olympic Games, competing in 2016, 2020 and 2024. Her personal best of 61.97 metres, set in Kolín, Czech Republic, on 19 July 2018, is the Thai national record.

== Early life ==
Insaeng was born in Surat Thani province. While attending Ban Bang San School, she initially played volleyball. A physical education teacher later encouraged her to try the throwing events, beginning with the shot put.

She later transferred to Tha U Thae Phitthaya School, which had an established athletics programme. There she began training in the discus in addition to the shot put. At age 15, she entered the national trials for the 2009 Asian Youth Games and was selected for the Thai youth team. At the Games in Singapore, she won the silver medal with a throw of 42.98 metres.

== Athletics career ==
=== 2010–2015: Junior career and senior breakthrough ===
Insaeng won silver in the discus at the 2010 Asian Junior Athletics Championships in Hanoi with 46.54 metres. Later that year, she finished fifth at the Summer Youth Olympics in Singapore.

She moved into senior regional competition at the 2011 SEA Games in Palembang, winning the women's discus title. The following year, she became Asian junior champion with 54.08 metres at the 2012 Asian Junior Athletics Championships in Colombo. She then placed sixth at the World Junior Championships in Barcelona with 54.47 metres.

At the 2013 Summer Universiade in Kazan, Insaeng threw 53.40 metres and originally finished fourth. World Athletics now lists her as the bronze medallist in the event. The original winner, Vera Ganeeva, later had all results from 25 July 2012 through 2 August 2014 disqualified following an anti-doping case. Insaeng also retained her SEA Games title later in 2013, winning in Naypyidaw with a Games-record throw of 56.77 metres.

Insaeng made her Asian Games debut at the 2014 Asian Games in Incheon, finishing fifth with 54.77 metres. At the 2015 SEA Games in Singapore, she won a third consecutive title and set a Games record of 59.56 metres. She also finished fourth at both the 2015 Asian Athletics Championships and the 2015 Summer Universiade, before making her senior World Championships debut in Beijing. She placed 27th overall in qualification with 55.14 metres.

=== 2016–2019: Olympic debut and continental medals ===
Insaeng made her Olympic debut at the 2016 Summer Olympics in Rio de Janeiro, where she finished 24th in qualification with 56.64 metres.

In 2017, she won silver at the 2017 Asian Athletics Championships in Bhubaneswar, throwing 56.82 metres. She then won her fourth successive SEA Games title in Kuala Lumpur with 55.23 metres. At the World Championships in London, she placed 26th overall in qualification with 55.16 metres.

On 19 July 2018, Insaeng threw 61.97 metres in Kolín, Czech Republic, setting the Thai national record. At the 2018 Asian Games in Jakarta, she finished fourth with 57.78 metres.

She won bronze at the 2019 Asian Athletics Championships in Doha with 58.20 metres. At the 2019 Summer Universiade in Naples, she finished fifth with 55.59 metres. She ended the season by winning her fifth consecutive SEA Games title in the Philippines with 60.33 metres.

=== 2021–2024: Second and third Olympic appearances ===
At the postponed Tokyo Olympics in 2021, Insaeng recorded a season best of 59.23 metres and placed 18th overall in qualification.

She won her sixth straight SEA Games title at the 2021 SEA Games, held in Hanoi in May 2022, with 53.09 metres.

At the 2023 SEA Games in Phnom Penh, Insaeng extended the streak to seven titles with a throw of 57.69 metres. She later won bronze at the 2023 Asian Athletics Championships in Bangkok with 55.80 metres.

At the 2023 World Athletics Championships in Budapest, Insaeng placed 28th in qualification with 56.19 metres. At the postponed 2022 Asian Games in Hangzhou, she finished fourth for the second consecutive edition, throwing 58.26 metres.

Insaeng qualified for her third Olympic Games at Paris 2024. She threw 58.07 metres in qualification and placed 30th overall.

=== 2025–2026: Eighth SEA Games title and first Asian Games medal ===
At the 2025 Asian Athletics Championships in Gumi, Insaeng won silver with 57.68 metres, finishing behind Feng Bin of China. She competed at the 2025 World Athletics Championships in Tokyo later that year, placing 27th overall in qualification with 58.01 metres.

At the 2025 SEA Games in Bangkok, she threw 58.86 metres to win an eighth consecutive women's discus title.

On 28 September 2026, Insaeng won her first Asian Games medal at the 2026 Asian Games in Japan. She took bronze in the women's discus with 61.43 metres, behind China's Feng Bin and Jiang Zhichao.

== International competitions ==
Representing Thailand
Year	Competition	Venue	Position	Event	Result	Notes
2009	Asian Youth Games	Singapore	2nd	Discus throw	42.98 m	
2010	Asian Junior Championships	Hanoi, Vietnam	2nd	Discus throw	46.54 m	
2010	Youth Olympic Games	Singapore	5th	Discus throw	45.47 m	
2011	World Youth Championships	Lille, France	17th (q)	Discus throw	45.47 m	
2011	SEA Games	Palembang, Indonesia	1st	Discus throw	52.25 m	
2012	Asian Junior Championships	Colombo, Sri Lanka	1st	Discus throw	54.08 m	
2012	World Junior Championships	Barcelona, Spain	6th	Discus throw	54.47 m	
2013	Universiade	Kazan, Russia	3rd	Discus throw	53.40 m	
2013	SEA Games	Naypyidaw, Myanmar	1st	Discus throw	56.77 m	GR, NR
2014	Asian Games	Incheon, South Korea	5th	Discus throw	54.77 m	
2015	SEA Games	Singapore	1st	Discus throw	59.56 m	GR
2015	Asian Championships	Wuhan, China	4th	Discus throw	58.47 m	
2015	Universiade	Gwangju, South Korea	4th	Discus throw	57.75 m	
2015	World Championships	Beijing, China	27th (q)	Discus throw	55.14 m	
2016	Olympic Games	Rio de Janeiro, Brazil	24th (q)	Discus throw	56.64 m	
2017	Asian Championships	Bhubaneswar, India	2nd	Discus throw	56.82 m	
2017	SEA Games	Kuala Lumpur, Malaysia	1st	Discus throw	55.23 m	
2017	World Championships	London, United Kingdom	26th (q)	Discus throw	55.16 m	
2018	Asian Games	Jakarta, Indonesia	4th	Discus throw	57.78 m	
2019	Asian Championships	Doha, Qatar	3rd	Discus throw	58.20 m	
2019	Universiade	Naples, Italy	5th	Discus throw	55.59 m	
2019	SEA Games	New Clark City, Philippines	1st	Discus throw	60.33 m	GR
2021	Olympic Games	Tokyo, Japan	18th (q)	Discus throw	59.23 m	
2022	SEA Games	Hanoi, Vietnam	1st	Discus throw	53.09 m	
2023	SEA Games	Phnom Penh, Cambodia	1st	Discus throw	57.69 m	
2023	Asian Championships	Bangkok, Thailand	3rd	Discus throw	55.80 m	
2023	World Championships	Budapest, Hungary	28th (q)	Discus throw	56.19 m	
2023	Asian Games	Hangzhou, China	4th	Discus throw	58.26 m	
2024	Olympic Games	Paris, France	30th (q)	Discus throw	58.07 m	
2025	Asian Championships	Gumi, South Korea	2nd	Discus throw	57.68 m	
2025	World Championships	Tokyo, Japan	27th (q)	Discus throw	58.01 m	
2025	SEA Games	Bangkok, Thailand	1st	Discus throw	58.86 m	
2026	Asian Games	Nagoya, Japan	3rd	Discus throw	61.43 m	SB

== Personal life ==
Insaeng studied political science at Pathumthani University. She joined the Royal Thai Police in 2019 and, by 2024, held the rank of police captain.
