= Navjeet Kaur Dhillon =

Indian track and field athlete

Navjeet Dhillon
Personal information
- Full name: Navjeet Kaur Dhillon
- Nationality: Indian
- Born: 6 March 1995 (age 31) Amritsar, India

Sport
- Country: India
- Sport: Athletics
- Event: Discus throw

Achievements and titles
- Personal best: Discus throw: 59.18 m (2018)
Medal record
Women's athletics
Representing India
South Asian Games
| Gold medal – first place | 2019 Kathmandu | Discus throw |
Commonwealth Games
| Bronze medal – third place | 2018 Gold Coast | Discus throw |

Navjeet Kaur Dhillon (born 6 March 1995) is an Indian track and field athlete who competes as a Discus thrower. Her current world ranking in the Women's Discus Throw category is 46, and in the Women's Overall ranking is 4165. She was the bronze medalist at the 2018 Commonwealth Games, with her final throw of 57.43 m and became the second Indian to win a medal at the World Junior Championships in Athletics in 2014. She holds a personal best of 59.18 m (194 ft 1 3/4 in), set in 2018 in Indian Grand Prix in February, 2018.

Dhillon had to wait for more than two years to receive her cash award for the World Junior Athletics Championship bronze medal. She hoped to receive a job offer by the Punjab government. She is presently employed in as an income tax inspector.

Following a doping violation in June 2022, she was banned for a period of three years.

== Career ==
Born in Amritsar, Dhillon won the Indian junior title in the discus in 2010 and the national youth title in 2011. She made her international debut at the 2011 World Youth Championships in Athletics, competing in qualifying only, and won her first medal (a bronze) at the 2011 Commonwealth Youth Games. Dhillon won a shot put/discus double at the 2012 Indian Junior Championships and claimed a silver medal at the 2012 Asian Junior Athletics Championships behind Subenrat Insaeng.

Dhillon made her first appearance in the senior ranks in the 2013 season, competing in both shot put and discus at the 2013 Asian Athletics Championships. More age category medals came at the 2014 Asian Junior Athletics Championships, where she was third in the shot put and second in the discus. She achieved a breakthrough at the 2014 World Junior Championships in Athletics, taking the discus bronze medal with a personal best throw of 56.36 m (184 ft 10 3/4 in). This made her the second Indian to win a medal at that competition, following in the footsteps of fellow women's discus thrower Seema Antil.

Dhillon topped the national podium in the discus in 2014 and 2015, as she transitioned into the senior ranks, as well as a shot put/discus double at the 2015 National Games of India. She was sixth in discus at the 2015 Asian Athletics Championships. She did not compete internationally in 2016 and 2017, though she won shot put national titles those years and was runner-up in the discus nationally. Dhillon won the discus bronze medal at the 2018 Commonwealth Games – her first senior international medal.

== International competitions ==
| Year | Competition | Venue | Position | Event | Result |
|---|---|---|---|---|---|
| 2011 | World Youth Championships | Lille, France | 11th (q) | Discus throw | 44.46 m |
| 2011 | Commonwealth Youth Games | Douglas, Isle of Man | 3rd | Discus throw | 45.27 m |
| 2012 | Asian Junior Championships | Colombo, Sri Lanka | 2nd | Discus throw | 44.78 m |
| 2013 | Asian Championships | Pune, India | 9th | Shot put | 12.91 m |
| 2013 | Asian Championships | Pune, India | 7th | Discus throw | 45.33 m |
| 2014 | Asian Junior Championships | Taipei, Taiwan | 3rd | Shot put | 14.99 m |
| 2014 | Asian Junior Championships | Taipei, Taiwan | 2nd | Discus throw | 53.66 m |
| 2014 | World Junior Championships | Eugene, United States | 3rd | Discus throw | 56.36 m |
| 2015 | Asian Championships | Wuhan, China | 6th | Discus throw | 51.66 m |
| 2018 | Commonwealth Games | Gold Coast, Australia | 3rd | Discus throw | 57.43 m |
| 2019 | Asian Championships | Doha, Qatar | 4th | Discus throw | 57.47 m |
| 2019 | South Asian Games | Kathmandu, Nepal | 1st | Discus throw | 49.85 m |

== National titles ==
- India Open Athletics Championships
  - Discus throw: 2014, 2015
  - Shot put: 2016, 2017
- National Games of India
  - Shot put: 2015
  - Discus throw: 2015
