= 2010 Asian Junior Athletics Championships =

14th Asian Junior Championships
- Dates: 1–4 July 2010
- Host city: Hanoi, Vietnam
- Venue: Mỹ Đình National Stadium
- Level: Junior (under-20)
- Events: 44
- Participation: 37 nations
- Records set: 2 Championship records

The 2010 Asian Junior Athletics Championships was the 14th edition of the international athletics competition for Asian under-20 athletes, organised by the Asian Athletics Association. It took place from 1 to 4 July 2010 at the Mỹ Đình National Stadium in Hanoi – the first time the competition was held in Vietnam. A total of 44 events were contested, which were divided equally between male and female athletes. Three championship records were improved over the course of the four-day competition and numerous national junior records were also bettered. The competition, including its opening and closing ceremonies, was broadcast live on Vietnamese carrier VTV3.

China was easily the most successful nation, topping the medal tally with thirteen gold medals and 26 medals in total. Kazakhstan initially had the second greatest number of winners, with 5 of their eight medals being gold medals, but positive doping tests later reduced them to eighth in the ranking. Second-placed Japan (with four golds) had a much larger overall haul, taking 22 medals at the competition. Chinese Taipei placed third with four golds and thirteen medals in total, while India had the third highest medal tally, with fourteen medals. Among the 21 nations that won medals in Hanoi, Thailand, Qatar and Bahrain were others to feature prominently on the podiums. The hosts, Vietnam, did not manage to secure a gold medal, but they still finished with a total of five medals.

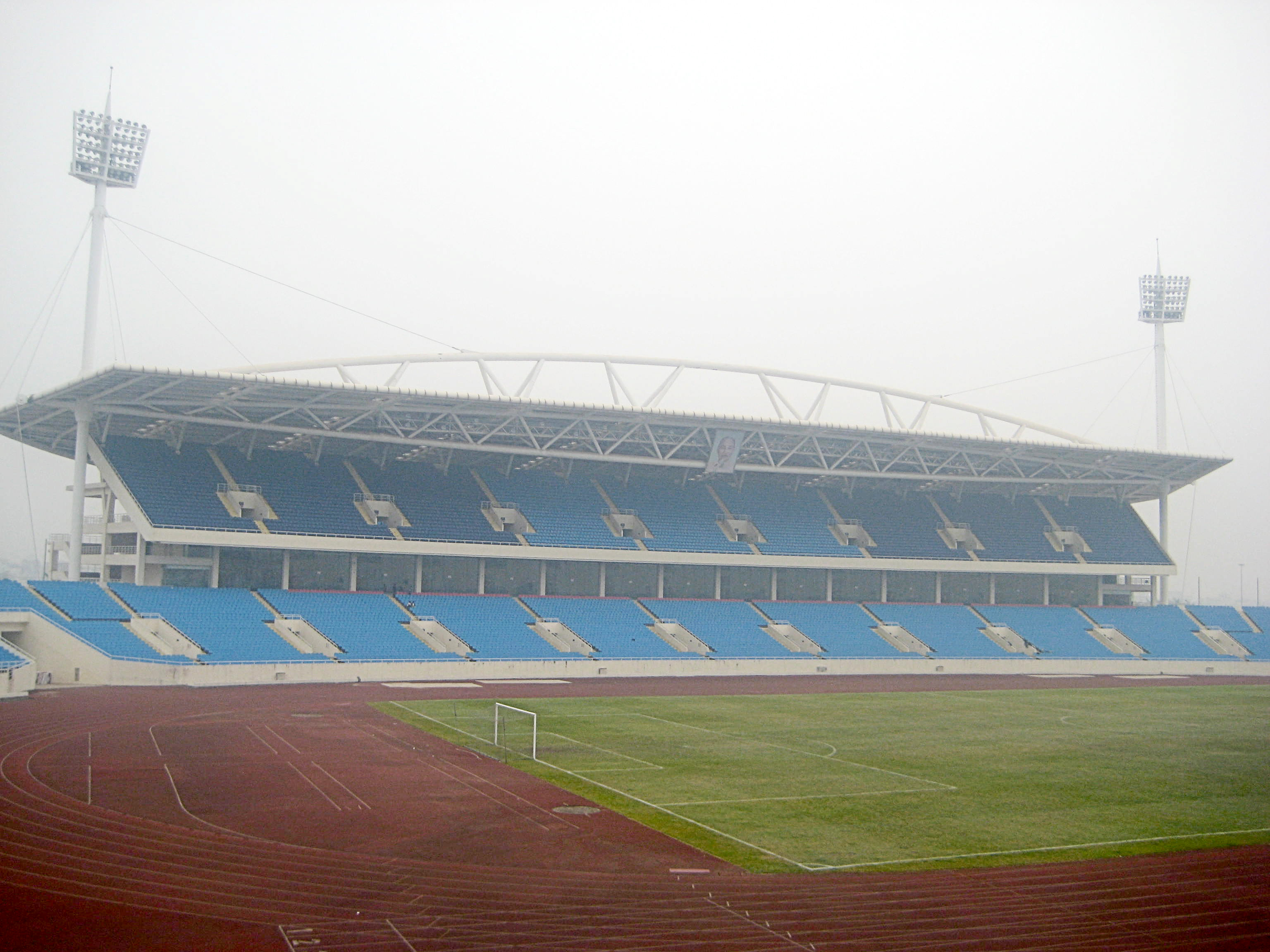
The track and field within the host stadium.

Some athletes used the championships as their final preparation before the 2010 World Junior Championships in Athletics, which was held in Moncton, Canada, later that month. Mutaz Essa Barshim provided one of the event highlights in the men's high jump as he broke the championship record as well setting the Qatari senior record with a clearance of 2.31 m. Another Qatari, Mohamed Al-Garni completed a double in the men's 800 metres and 1500 metres. Thailand's Supachai Chimdee set a championship record in the men's 200 metres and also helped the Thais to victory in both relay events. India's Harminder Singh was the third competition record-breaker, winning the hammer throw in 71.53 metres – also an Indian junior record.

Yulia Gavrilova of Kazakhstan initially scored a sprint triple, winning the 100 metres, 200 m and 4×100 metres relay, but at the event she had a positive drug test for the banned substance nandrolone, which saw all of her results at the competition retrospectively annulled. Iraq's Gulustan Mahmood Ieso took the 400 metres and 800 metres. Chinese athlete Gu Siyu was dominant in the women's throws, winning both the shot put and discus competitions. Her compatriot Jiang Shan took 100/200 m silvers and a relay bronze, while Zhang Xiaojun was also twice runner-up (in the 800 and 1500 m). Genzebe Shumi led Bahrain's success in the middle- and long-distance track events, winning the 1500 m and taking 3000 metres silver.

== Records ==
=== Men ===
Name	Event	Country	Record	Type
Mutaz Essa Barshim	Men's high jump	Qatar	2.31	NR, CR
Harminder Singh	Men's hammer throw	India	71.53	NJR
Supachai Chimdee	Men's 200 metres	Thailand	20.80	CR
Sajjad Hashemi	Men's 200 metres	Iran	21.09	NR
Farkhod Kuralov	Men's 800 metres	Tajikistan	1:49.41	NJR
Kwan Tsz Him; Ng Ka Fung; Ho Man Lok; Ho Ping Kwan	Men's 4×100 m relay	Hong Kong	40.51	NJR
Hsiang Chun-Hsien	Men's high jump	Chinese Taipei	2.13	NJR
Vahid Seddigh	Men's triple jump	Iran	15.78	NJR
Cheng Chao-Tsun	Men's javelin throw	Chinese Taipei	73.26	NJR, NYR

=== Women ===
Name	Event	Country	Record	Type
Yulia Gavrilova	Women's 200 metres	Kazakhstan	23.41 (annulled)	NJR
T. Piriyah	Women's 400 metres hurdles	Singapore	1:01.69	NJR
Govind Raj Gayathri	Women's triple jump	India	13.58	NJR
Key: CR — Championship record • NR — National record • NJR — National junior record • NYR — National youth record

== Medal summary ==
=== Men ===
Event	Gold		Silver		Bronze	
100 metres (wind: −2.1 m/s)	Zheng Dongsheng (CHN)	10.65	Hassan Taftian (IRI)	10.81	Kazuki Baba (JPN)	10.86 PB
200 metres (wind: −0.9 m/s)	Supachai Chimdee (THA)	20.80 CR	Zheng Dongsheng (CHN)	21.03 PB	Taishi Nakayama (JPN)	21.05 PB
400 metres	Sajjad Hashemi (IRI)	47.18	Lin Yang (CHN)	47.26	Chen Chieh (TPE)	47.85
800 metres	Mohamed Al-Garni (QAT)	1:48.13	Hamza Driouch (QAT)	1:48.79	Abdulaziz Mohamed (KSA)	1:48.97 PB
1500 metres	Mohamed Al-Garni (QAT)	3:55.94	Ryota Matono (JPN)	3:58.28 PB	Ghasem Farisat (IRI)	3:59.27 PB
5000 metres	Edwin Chebii Kimurer (BHR)	15:08.14	Ikuto Yufu (JPN)	15:08.93	Ikki Takeuchi (JPN)	15:21.45
10,000 metres	Suresh Kumar (IND)	31:53.68	Keita Shitara (JPN)	32:47.16	Shingo Hayashi (JPN)	35:58.95
110 m hurdles	Li Yen-Lin (TPE)	13.90 PB	Siddhanth Thingalaya (IND)	13.96 PB	Zhang Chi (CHN)	14.15 PB
400 m hurdles	Seiya Kato (JPN)	50.83 PB	Chen Chieh (TPE)	51.13	Yuichi Nagano (JPN)	51.21 PB
3000 metres steeplechase	Hiroaki Koike (JPN)	9:10.66	Isaac Chelimo (BHR)	9:30.80	Chou Ting Yin (TPE)	9:36.63
4×100 m relay	Thailand (THA); Narakorn Chaiprasert; Tossaporn Boonhan; Weerawat Pharueang; Supachai Chimdee	39.82	Hong Kong (HKG); Kwan Tsz Him; Ng Ka Fung; Ho Man Lok; Ho Ping Kwan	40.51 NJR	Japan (JPN); Kazuki Baba; Taishi Nakayama; Naohiro Yokoyama; Farouq Ishimoto	40.64
4×400 m relay	Thailand (THA); Nitat Kaewkhong; Nitipol Thongpoon; Arnon Jaiaree; Supachai Chimdee	3:11.39	Japan (JPN); Yuichi Nagano; Suguru Ito; Seiya Kato; Kengo Yamazaki	3:12.14	Iran (IRI); Alireza Mardanizadeh; Alireza Mehr-Safouti; Ali Shaffaf; Sajjad Hashemi	3:16.90
10,000 m walk	Wang Zhendong (CHN)	44:35.95 PB	Manabu Aoki (JPN)	45:01.73	Patel Mani Ram (IND)	45:06.51 PB
High jump	Mutaz Essa Barshim (QAT)	2.31 m NR CR	Zhang Guowei (CHN)	2.23 m PB	Hsiang Chun-Hsien (TPE)	2.19 m NJR
Pole vault	Nikita Filippov (KAZ)	5.05 m	Sergey Grigoryev (KAZ)	4.95 m	Sakurai Shun (JPN)	4.65 m
Long jump	Lin Ching-hsuan (TPE)	7.94 m (w)	Supanara Sukhasvasti na Ayudhya (THA)	7.84 m (w)	Ankit Sharma (IND)	7.77 m (w)
Triple jump	Cao Shuo (CHN)	16.84 m (w)	Arpinder Singh (IND)	16.13 m PB	Vahid Seddigh (IRI)	15.78 m NJR
Shot put	Alireza Mehr-Safouti (IRI)	19.07 m	Zuo Shihao (CHN)	18.56 m	Mousab Aicha Esheb (SYR)	17.48 m
Discus throw	Hamid Mansoor (SYR)	56.25 m	Prabhjot Singh (IND)	54.13 m	Kirpal Singh Batth (IND)	53.23 m
Hammer throw	Harminder Singh (IND)	71.53 m NJR	Pejman Ghalehnoei (IRI)	64.11 m PB	Mohammad Abdulhamed (KUW)	62.49 m
Javelin throw	Sun Jianjun (CHN)	73.38 m PB	Cheng Chao-Tsun (TPE)	73.26 m NJR/NYR	Huang Shih-Feng (TPE)	72.43 m
Decathlon	Mohamed Ahmed Al-Mannai (QAT)	7078 pts	Abdulrahman Mahmoud (KSA)	6850 pts	Sergey Timshin (UZB)	6677 pts

=== Women ===
Event	Gold		Silver		Bronze	
100 metres^{†} (wind: −1.5 m/s)	Jiang Shan (CHN)	11.96	Setya Utami Tri (INA)	12.10	Olga Safronova (KAZ)	12.17
200 metres^{†}	Jiang Shan (CHN)	24.04 PB	Chinta Shanthi (IND)	24.46 PB	Viktoriya Zyabkina (KAZ)	24.55
400 metres	Gulustan Mahmood Ieso (IRQ)	54.17	Chen Lin (CHN)	54.81	Zhao Yanmin (CHN)	55.03
800 metres	Gulustan Mahmood Ieso (IRQ)	2:14.4	Zhang Xiaojun (CHN)	2:16.0	Do Thi Thao (VIE)	2:16.7
1500 metres	Genzebe Shumi (BHR)	4:30.76	Zhang Xiaojun (CHN)	4:31.79	Chikako Mori (JPN)	4:35.26
3000 metres	Mahiro Akamatsu (JPN)	9:36.47	Genzebe Shumi (BHR)	9:37.57 PB	Sun Lamei (CHN)	9:39.89
5000 metres	Tejitu Daba (BHR)	16:21.30	Katsuki Suga (JPN)	16:31.22	Jang Eun-Young (KOR)	16:37.10
100 m hurdles	Wu Shuijiao (CHN)	13.77	Huang Wen-Lin (TPE)	14.18	Hemasree Jayapal (IND)	14.56
400 m hurdles	Haruka Shibata (JPN)	1:00.20	Svetlana Zagorodneva (KAZ)	1:01.04	T. Piriyah (SIN)	1:01.69 NJR
3000 metres steeplechase	Zarina Mentayeva (KAZ)	11:21.68	Aranga Weerasing Pathiranage (SRI)	11:38.02	Thi Thu Huong Nguyen (VIE)	12:01.11
4×100 m relay^{†}	India (IND); Nirupama Sunderraj; Nanda Sarvani; Chinta Shanthi; Govind Raj Gayathri	45.82	China (CHN); Chen Lin; Jiang Shan; Wu Shuijiao; Lu Minjia	45.87	Chinese Taipei (TPE); Liao Ching-Hsien; Hsu Yung-Chieh; Huang Wen-Lin; Tsai Pei-Ju	45.90
4×400 m relay	Thailand (THA); Kunjana Boonrung; Pornpan Hoemhuk; Sunia Pedbanna; Karat Srimueng	3:53.77	Vietnam (VIE); Thi Nhu Hai Nguyen; Thi Nga Nguyen; Thi Van Nguyen; Thi Thuy Nguyen	3:58.39	Hong Kong (HKG); Hui Man Ling; Leung Hau Sze; Lo Wing Hei; Fong Yee Pui	4:13.78
10,000 m walk	Tong Lingling (CHN)	49:11.93 PB	Hiroi Maeda (JPN)	49:25.87	Ayman Kozhakhmetova (KAZ)	50:17.04
High jump	Wu Meng-Chia (TPE)	1.78 m	Tran Huy Hoa (VIE)	1.76 m	Fung Wai Yee (HKG)	1.68 m
Pole vault	Xu Huiqin (CHN)	3.90 m	Yuko Enomoto (JPN)	3.65 m	Ho Chieh-Ying (TPE)	3.40 m PB
Long jump	Lu Minjia (CHN)	6.47 m	Renubala Mahanta (IND)	6.11 m (w)	Shardha Ghule (IND)	6.05 m (w)
Triple jump	Sun Yan (CHN)	13.75 m PB	Govind Raj Gayathri (IND)	13.58 m NJR	Wei Mingchen (CHN)	13.15 m
Shot put	Gu Siyu (CHN)	15.47 m	Lee Sung-Hye (KOR)	14.49 m	Taryarea Tikaveva (UZB)	13.61 m PB
Discus throw	Gu Siyu (CHN)	52.52 m	Subenrat Insaeng (THA)	46.54 m	Jeon Hye-Ji (KOR)	44.32 m
Hammer throw	Galina Mityaeva (TJK)	56.05 m	Miya Itoman (JPN)	46.77 m	Not awarded	
Javelin throw	Anastasiya Svechnikova (UZB)	54.32 m	Sui Liping (CHN)	52.64 m	Yuka Sato (JPN)	48.46 m
Heptathlon	Ling Chu Chia (TPE)	4848 pts	Sunisa Khotseemueang (THA)	4551 pts	Bùi Thị Thu Thảo (VIE)	4170 pts

- † = The following results and medals for Kazakhstan were retrospectively annulled after Yulia Gavrilova's positive doping test:
  - 100 metres: Yulia Gavrilova (KAZ) (11.85)
  - 200 metres: Yulia Gavrilova (KAZ) (23.41 NJR)
  - 4×100 m relay: Kazakhstan (KAZ) Aygerim Shynyzbekova, Olga Bludova, Viktoriya Zyabkina, Yulia Gavrilova (45.57)

== Medal table ==
Rank	Nation	Gold	Silver	Bronze	Total
1	China	13	9	4	26
2	Japan	4	9	9	22
3	Chinese Taipei	4	3	6	13
4	Thailand	4	3	0	7
5	Qatar	4	1	0	5
6	India	3	6	5	14
7	Bahrain	3	2	0	5
8	Iran	2	2	3	7
8	Kazakhstan	2	2	3	7
10	Iraq	2	0	0	2
11	Uzbekistan	1	0	2	3
12	Syria	1	0	1	2
13	Tajikistan	1	0	0	1
14	Vietnam	0	2	3	5
15	Hong Kong	0	1	2	3
15	South Korea	0	1	2	3
17	Saudi Arabia	0	1	1	2
18	Indonesia	0	1	0	1
18	Sri Lanka	0	1	0	1
20	Kuwait	0	0	1	1
20	Singapore	0	0	1	1
Totals (21 entries)		44	44	43	131
