= Athletics at the 2018 Asian Games – Women's discus throw =

Asian Games athletics event

Women's discus throw at the 2018 Asian Games
- Venue: Gelora Bung Karno Stadium
- Dates: 30 August 2018
- Competitors: 8 from 5 nations

Medalists
gold medal	Chen Yang	China
silver medal	Feng Bin	China
bronze medal	Seema Punia	India

The women's discus throw event at the 2018 Asian Games was held on 30 August at the Gelora Bung Karno Stadium.

== Schedule ==
All times are Western Indonesia Time (UTC+07:00)

Date	Time	Event
Thursday, 30 August 2018	18:40	Final

== Records ==
Prior to this competition, the existing world, Asian and Games records were as follows.

World Record	Gabriele Reinsch (GDR)	76.80	Neubrandenburg, East Germany	9 July 1988
Asian Record	Xiao Yanling (CHN)	71.68	Beijing, China	14 March 1992
Games Record	Li Yanfeng (CHN)	66.18	Guangzhou, China	23 November 2010

== Results ==
Rank	Athlete	Attempt						Result	Notes
Rank	Athlete	1	2	3	4	5	6	Result	Notes
1st place, gold medalist(s)	Chen Yang (CHN)	59.61	64.45	63.57	64.20	64.89	65.12	65.12	
2nd place, silver medalist(s)	Feng Bin (CHN)	57.26	61.84	62.34	63.81	61.84	64.25	64.25	
3rd place, bronze medalist(s)	Seema Punia (IND)	58.51	X	62.26	61.28	X	61.18	62.26	
4	Subenrat Insaeng (THA)	57.12	56.48	57.78	56.04	X	54.36	57.78	
5	Sandeep Kumari (IND)	53.20	X	54.61	X	X	X	54.61	
6	Noora Salem Jasim (BRN)	X	42.24	51.19	X	X	X	51.19	
7	Charuwan Sroisena (THA)	43.03	X	43.21	42.70	42.79	43.87	43.87	
8	Fatima Al-Hosani (UAE)	X	41.66	X	42.95	41.25	X	42.95	
