= 2012 World Junior Championships in Athletics – Women's discus throw =

The women's discus throw at the 2012 World Junior Championships in Athletics was held at the Estadi Olímpic Lluís Companys on 13 and 15 July.

== Medalists ==
Gold	Anna Rüh; Germany
Silver	Shanice Craft; Germany
Bronze	Shelbi Vaughan; United States

== Records ==
Prior to the competition, the existing world junior and championship records were as follows.

World Junior Record	Ilke Wyludda (GDR)	74.40 m	East Berlin, East Germany	13 September 1988
Championship Record	Ilke Wyludda (GDR)	68.24 m	Sudbury, Canada	31 July 1988
World Junior Leading	Anna Rüh (GER)	63.14 m	Bochum, Germany	16 June 2012

=== Qualification ===
Qual. rule: qualification standard 53.00 m (Q) or at least best 12 qualified (q)

Rank	Group	Name	Nationality	#1	#2	#3	Result	Note
1	B	Shanice Craft	Germany	55.75			55.75	Q
2	A	Anna Rüh	Germany	51.62	55.25		55.25	Q
3	A	Shelbi Vaughan	United States	54.78			54.78	Q
4	A	Subenrat Insaeng	Thailand	X	51.93	54.46	54.46	Q
5	A	Sositina Hakeai	New Zealand	53.38			53.38	Q, PB
6	B	Alex Collatz	United States	52.55	52.28	51.39	52.55	q
7	B	Gu Siyu	China	51.66	X	X	51.66	q
8	B	Krisztina Váradi	Hungary	50.26	51.13	50.53	51.13	q
9	B	Natalya Shirobokova	Russia	50.74	X	49.51	50.74	q
10	B	Heidi Schmidt	Sweden	X	43.38	49.77	49.77	q
11	B	Merewarihi Vaka	New Zealand	46.17	49.59	46.93	49.59	q
12	A	Tetiana Yuryeva	Ukraine	X	X	49.46	49.46	q
13	A	Elizabeth Álvarez	Venezuela	40.92	49.17	43.85	49.17	PB
14	B	Ieva Zarankaité	Lithuania	45.45	43.84	49.06	49.06	
15	B	Rosalía Vázquez	Cuba	48.07	48.77	X	48.77	
16	A	Kätlin Tõllasson	Estonia	48.50	48.49	48.34	48.50	
17	B	Zehra Uzunbilek	Turkey	X	47.48	46.64	47.48	
18	A	Keshia McGrath-Volau	Australia	43.26	X	46.59	46.59	
19	B	Taylah Sengul	Australia	X	43.96	45.87	45.87	
20	A	Simoné Meyer	South Africa	45.84	X	X	45.84	
21	A	María Belén Toimil	Spain	X	42.32	45.83	45.83	
22	A	Shadine Duquemin	Great Britain	45.51	X	X	45.51	
23	A	Emma Ljungberg	Sweden	39.26	45.36	44.40	45.36	
24	B	Ischke Senekal	South Africa	41.56	45.33	43.93	45.33	
25	B	Rayann Chin	Canada	44.50	X	45.24	45.24	
26	B	Charlene Engelbrecht	Namibia	X	X	44.97	44.97	
27	A	Ashley Arroyo	Puerto Rico	44.91	X	X	44.91	
28	B	Chukwunonso Judith Okwelogu	Nigeria	44.87	X	X	44.87	
29	A	Elçin Kaya	Turkey	X	42.86	44.19	44.19	
30	B	Viktoriya Savytska	Ukraine	38.73	X	43.33	43.33	
31	B	June Kintana	Spain	43.30	X	X	43.30	
32	B	Maia Varela	Argentina	X	42.50	X	42.50	
33	A	Tarasue Barnett	Jamaica	42.06	40.92	X	42.06	
34	A	Asianna C. Covington	Canada	35.36	40.63	X	40.63	
35	A	Juliana Pereira	Portugal	40.12	X	X	40.12	

=== Final ===
Rank	Name	Nationality	#1	#2	#3	#4	#5	#6	Result	Note
1st place, gold medalist(s)	Anna Rüh	Germany	55.25	57.87	X	X	58.48	62.38	62.38	
2nd place, silver medalist(s)	Shanice Craft	Germany	58.44	X	58.51	54.67	51.86	60.42	60.42	
3rd place, bronze medalist(s)	Shelbi Vaughan	United States	X	58.46	X	60.07	X	58.72	60.07	
4	Sositina Hakeai	New Zealand	X	47.50	53.82	54.89	X	56.17	56.17	NJ
5	Gu Siyu	China	54.81	54.86	X	54.46	54.77	55.78	55.78	
6	Subenrat Insaeng	Thailand	54.47	52.60	53.01	53.17	X	X	54.47	
7	Krisztina Váradi	Hungary	51.44	X	49.23	50.47	49.48	X	51.44	SB
8	Alex Collatz	United States	48.74	X	47.42	49.28	X	X	49.28	
9	Tetiana Yuryeva	Ukraine	46.73	48.73	47.60				48.73	
10	Merewarihi Vaka	New Zealand	48.48	47.92	X				48.48	
11	Natalya Shirobokova	Russia	X	47.96	10.14				47.96	
12	Heidi Schmidt	Sweden	45.54	X	X				45.54	

== Participation ==
According to an unofficial count, 35 athletes from 25 countries participated in the event.

- Argentina (1)
- Australia (2)
- Canada (2)
- China (1)
- Cuba (1)
- Estonia (1)
- Germany (2)
- Hungary (1)
- Jamaica (1)
- Lithuania (1)
- Namibia (1)
- New Zealand (2)
- Nigeria (1)
- Portugal (1)
- Puerto Rico (1)
- Russia (1)
- South Africa (2)
- Spain (2)
- Sweden (2)
- Thailand (1)
- Turkey (2)
- Ukraine (2)
- United Kingdom (1)
- United States (2)
- Venezuela (1)
