= 2017 Asian Athletics Championships – Women's discus throw =

The women's discus throw at the 2017 Asian Athletics Championships was held on 9 July.

== Results ==
Rank	Name	Nationality	#1	#2	#3	#4	#5	#6	Result	Notes
1st place, gold medalist(s)	Chen Yang	China	60.41	x	x	57.80	57.86	59.84	60.41	
2nd place, silver medalist(s)	Subenrat Insaeng	Thailand	53.82	56.25	x	54.46	54.54	56.82	56.82	
3rd place, bronze medalist(s)	Lu Xiaoxin	China	53.82	56.25	x	54.46	54.54	56.82	56.82	
4	Li Tsai-yi	Chinese Taipei	53.17	50.70	54.48	x	x	x	54.48	
5	Kamalpreet Kaur Bal	India	53.61	x	54.32	53.12	52.01	x	54.32	
6	Seema Punia	India	x	x	52.30	52.55	x	54.11	54.11	
7	Himani Singh	India	49.60	51.39	48.67	50.77	50.90	48.81	51.39	
8	Nanaka Kori	Japan	x	49.00	49.55	48.86	48.33	47.56	49.55	
9	Eriko Nakata	Japan	42.06	48.98	46.68				48.98	
10	Hiba Omar	Syria	x	43.82	x				43.82	
