= Athletics at the 2020 Summer Olympics – Women's discus throw =

Women's discus throw at the Games of the XXXII Olympiad
- Olympic Athletics
- Venue: Japan National Stadium
- Dates: 31 July 2021 (qualifying); 2 August 2021 (final)
- Competitors: 31 from 19 nations
- Winning distance: 68.98m

Medalists
1st place, gold medalist(s)		Valarie Allman	United States
2nd place, silver medalist(s)		Kristin Pudenz	Germany
3rd place, bronze medalist(s)		Yaime Pérez	Cuba

The women's discus throw event at the 2020 Summer Olympics took place on 31 July and 2 August 2021 at the Japan National Stadium, with 31 athletes competing.

== Summary ==
Sandra Perković came in as the two time defending Olympic Champion. Her personal best 71.41m is the best throw in almost 30 years. Yaime Pérez was the 2019 World Champion, when Perković "only" got bronze. Jorinde van Klinken had the longest throw of the year at 70.22m. Valarie Allman had the second best, those two the only entrants over 70 metres in the previous two years, Allman over 70 in both years.

Allman was the only first throw automatic qualifier for the final, Kamalpreet Kaur getting the mark exactly on her third and last attempt. It took 61.52m to get into the final. van Klinken did not qualify.

8 throws into the final, Kristin Pudenz was the first thrower over 63 metres at 63.07m. Two throws later, Pérez got 65.72m to take the lead. That lasted long enough for Allman to take her first throw, capped with a pirouette, the former dancer launched it 68.98 m (226 ft 3 in). Pérez was the only other athlete in the final who had thrown that far in the last two years, and only by 1 cm. In the second round, Liliana Cá moved into bronze position with a 63.93m. On her second attempt, Pudenz moved back into medals with a 65.34m. By the time Pérez was up for her second attempt, the rain was becoming a factor. The ring was so slippery, Allman slipped out of the ring, her throw called a foul. The next thrower, Marike Steinacker skidded across the wet ring before even completing her spin. The event was stopped for 2 minutes while someone tried to dry the ring with a towel. They called the next thrower Yang Chen who slipped and threw her discus into the cage awkwardly. They called Cá who slipped and fell on all four before her first spin. More people with towels and brooms were dispatched to try to dry the ring, still in pouring rain. The athletes looked for dry places while the crew put plastic over the ring and new forms of squeegees and drying devices were employed. After about 20 minutes the athletes were released to go wait under the stadium. Another ten minutes went by as the rain began to decrease. A crew of close to 20 people tried to dry the ring and surrounding area. 40 minutes after the last throw, the athletes were brought back to the competition area where they began warming up.

After a 45 minute break, competition resumed. Allman, Steinacker, Yang and Cá were awarded new throws. As the first thrower back, Allman was tentative, hew throw going vertical as much as horizontal. She voluntarily took a foul. Steinacker was able to get a 62.02 which turned out to be enough to get her into the final three throws. In the delayed third round, Perković got 65.01m, not enough for medals but in a threatening position. And Kaur was able to get into the final 8.

That final eight was marred by fouls, 14 out of 24 throws. Only Pudenz was able to improve to 66.86m, which secured her hold on silver but didn't challenge Allman's first round throw. Essentially the medal positions proved to be established in the first round and a half, before the rain. And it proved to be the United States' first gold medal of the track program.

== Background ==
This will be the 22nd appearance of the event, having appeared at every Summer Olympics since women's athletics was introduced in 1928.

== Qualification ==
A National Olympic Committee (NOC) could enter up to 3 qualified athletes in the women's discus throw event if all athletes meet the entry standard or qualify by ranking during the qualifying period. (The limit of 3 has been in place since the 1930 Olympic Congress.) The qualifying standard is 63.50 metres. This standard was "set for the sole purpose of qualifying athletes with exceptional performances unable to qualify through the IAAF World Rankings pathway." The world rankings, based on the average of the best five results for the athlete over the qualifying period and weighted by the importance of the meet, will then be used to qualify athletes until the cap of 32 is reached.

The qualifying period was originally from 1 May 2019 to 29 June 2020. Due to the COVID-19 pandemic, the period was suspended from 6 April 2020 to 30 November 2020, with the end date extended to 29 June 2021. The world rankings period start date was also changed from 1 May 2019 to 30 June 2020; athletes who had met the qualifying standard during that time were still qualified, but those using world rankings would not be able to count performances during that time. The qualifying time standards could be obtained in various meets during the given period that have the approval of the IAAF. Both outdoor and indoor meets are eligible. The most recent Area Championships may be counted in the ranking, even if not during the qualifying period.

NOCs can also use their universality place—each NOC can enter one female athlete regardless of time if they had no female athletes meeting the entry standard for an athletics event—in the discus throw.

== Competition format ==
The 2020 competition will continue to use the two-round format with divided final introduced in 1936. The qualifying round gives each competitor three throws to achieve a qualifying distance (64.00 metres); if fewer than 12 women do so, the top 12 will advance. The final provides each thrower with three throws; the top eight throwers receive an additional three throws for a total of six, with the best to count (qualifying round throws are not considered for the final).

== Records ==
Prior to this competition, the existing world, Olympic, and area records are as follows.

World record	Gabriele Reinsch (GDR)	76.80	Neubrandenburg, East Germany	9 July 1988
Olympic record	Martina Hellmann (GDR)	72.30	Seoul, South Korea	29 September 1988

Area	Distance (m)	Athlete	Nation
Africa (records)	64.87	Elizna Naudé	South Africa
Asia (records)	71.68	Xiao Yanling	China
Europe (records)	76.80 WR	Gabriele Reinsch	East Germany
North, Central America and Caribbean (records)	70.88	Hilda Elisa Ramos	Cuba
Oceania (records)	69.64	Dani Stevens	Australia
South America (records)	65.34	Andressa de Morais	Brazil

== Schedule ==
All times are Japan Standard Time (UTC+9)

The women's discus took place over two separate days.

Date	Time	Round
Saturday, 31 July 2021	9:30	Qualifying
Monday, 2 August 2021	20:00	Final

== Results ==
=== Qualifying ===
Qualification Rules: Qualifying performance 64.00 (Q) or at least 12 best performers (q) advance to the Final.

Rank	Group	Athlete	Nation	1	2	3	Distance	Notes
1	B	Valarie Allman	United States	66.42	—	—	66.42	Q
2	B	Kamalpreet Kaur	India	60.29	63.97	64.00	64.00	Q
3	A	Sandra Perković	Croatia	63.75	x	x	63.75	q
4	A	Kristin Pudenz	Germany	63.53	x	63.73	63.73	q
5	B	Daisy Osakue	Italy	52.26	63.66	x	63.66	q, =NR
6	B	Marike Steinacker	Germany	63.22	x	x	63.22	q
7	B	Yaime Pérez	Cuba	62.90	63.18	59.97	63.18	q
8	B	Liliana Cá	Portugal	57.70	62.85	x	62.85	q
9	B	Chen Yang	China	62.59	61.57	62.72	62.72	q
10	B	Claudine Vita	Germany	62.39	62.46	62.38	62.46	q
11	A	Shadae Lawrence	Jamaica	59.55	62.27	x	62.27	q
12	B	Izabela da Silva	Brazil	56.14	61.52	60.64	61.52	q
13	B	Marija Tolj	Croatia	54.76	61.48	60.33	61.48	
14	A	Jorinde van Klinken	Netherlands	x	61.15	x	61.15	
15	A	Mélina Robert-Michon	France	x	60.88	59.81	60.88	
16	A	Seema Punia	India	x	60.57	58.93	60.57	
17	B	Feng Bin	China	59.26	60.45	x	60.45	
18	B	Subenrat Insaeng	Thailand	54.99	59.23	56.82	59.23	SB
19	A	Chrysoula Anagnostopoulou	Greece	57.06	59.18	58.55	59.18	
20	A	Su Xinyue	China	55.37	58.90	57.85	58.90	
20	B	Andressa de Morais	Brazil	x	x	58.90	58.90	
22	B	Dani Stevens	Australia	53.01	58.77	54.60	58.77	
23	A	Denia Caballero	Cuba	x	57.96	x	57.96	
24	A	Fernanda Martins	Brazil	x	57.90	x	57.90	
25	A	Irina Rodrigues	Portugal	x	54.60	57.03	57.03	
26	B	Dragana Tomašević	Serbia	55.97	56.95	56.43	56.95	
27	A	Rachel Dincoff	United States	55.10	x	56.22	56.22	
28	A	Kelsey Card	United States	54.85	55.78	56.04	56.04	
29	B	Karen Gallardo	Chile	55.36	53.89	55.81	55.81	
30	A	Alexandra Emilianov	Moldova	54.57	x	x	54.57	
31	A	Nataliya Semenova	Ukraine	x	x	54.28	54.28	

=== Final ===
Rank	Athlete	Nation	1	2	3	4	5	6	Distance	Notes
1st place, gold medalist(s)	Valarie Allman	United States	68.98	x	x	64.76	66.78	x	68.98	
2nd place, silver medalist(s)	Kristin Pudenz	Germany	63.07	65.34	64.35	x	66.86	x	66.86	PB
3rd place, bronze medalist(s)	Yaime Pérez	Cuba	65.72	62.16	63.20	65.20	x	x	65.72	
4	Sandra Perković	Croatia	62.53	x	65.01	x	x	63.25	65.01	
5	Liliana Cá	Portugal	62.31	63.93	x	x	x	–	63.93	
6	Kamalpreet Kaur	India	61.62	x	63.70	x	61.37	x	63.70	
7	Shadae Lawrence	Jamaica	60.22	62.12	58.98	59.46	59.26	x	62.12	
8	Marike Steinacker	Germany	x	62.02	x	x	60.10	60.32	62.02	
9	Claudine Vita	Germany	60.70	x	61.80	did not advance			61.80	
10	Chen Yang	China	61.57	59.59	61.43	did not advance			61.57	
11	Izabela da Silva	Brazil	60.39	x	59.56	did not advance			60.39	
12	Daisy Osakue	Italy	59.97	x	x	did not advance			59.97	
