= Athletics at the 2013 SEA Games – Women's discus throw =

The women's discus throw at the 2013 SEA Games, the athletics was held in Naypyidaw, Myanmar. The track and field events took place at the Wunna Theikdi Stadiumon December 19.

== Schedule ==
All times are Myanmar Standard Time (UTC+06:30)

Date	Time	Event
Thursday, 19 December 2013	15:30	Final

== Records ==
Prior to this competition, the existing world, Asian, and Southeast Asian Games records were as follows.

World Record	Gabriele Reinsch (GDR)	76.80	Neubrandenburg, East Germany	9 July 1988
Asian Record	Xiao Yanling (CHN)	71.68	Beijing, China	14 March 1992
Games Record	Subenrat Insaeng (THA)	52.25	Palembang, Indonesia	15 November 2011

== Results ==
Legend

- X — Failure

Rank	Athlete	Attempts						Result	Notes
Rank	Athlete	1	2	3	4	5	6	Result	Notes
1st place, gold medalist(s)	Subenrat Insaeng (THA)	?	?	?	?	?	?	56.77	GR, NR
2nd place, silver medalist(s)	Zhang Guirong (SIN)	?	?	?	?	?	?	42.26	
3rd place, bronze medalist(s)	Du Xianhui (SIN)	?	?	?	?	?	?	41.02	
4	Mar Mar San (MYA)	?	?	?	?	?	?	37.91	
5	Phonexai Paosavad (LAO)	?	?	?	?	?	?	34.98	NR
6	Soe Soe Htwe (MYA)	?	?	?	?	?	?	31.58	
