= 2009 European Athletics U23 Championships – Women's discus throw =

The women's discus throw event at the 2009 European Athletics U23 Championships was held in Kaunas, Lithuania, at S. Dariaus ir S. Girėno stadionas (Darius and Girėnas Stadium) on 16 and 17 July.

== Medalists ==
Gold	Eden Francis; United Kingdom
Silver	Vera Karmishina; Russia
Bronze	Jade Nicholls; United Kingdom

== Results ==
=== Final ===
17 July

Rank	Name	Nationality	Attempts						Result	Notes
Rank	Name	Nationality	1	2	3	4	5	6	Result	Notes
1st place, gold medalist(s)	Eden Francis	United Kingdom	54.79	53.85	57.29	53.66	x	53.57	57.29	
2nd place, silver medalist(s)	Vera Karmishina	Russia	43.25	54.48	52.76	x	x	x	54.48	
3rd place, bronze medalist(s)	Jade Nicholls	United Kingdom	53.44	52.00	51.99	50.56	48.94	54.44	54.44	
4	Sofia Larsson	Sweden	x	x	53.74	50.84	53.32	53.47	53.74	
5	Coralie Glatre	France	52.80	43.88	46.53	47.59	49.32	x	52.80	
6	Yevgeniya Pecherina	Russia	51.96	52.66	x	x	x	52.55	52.66	
7	Viktoriya Bolbat	Ukraine	51.95	x	x	x	50.25	50.90	51.95	
8	Irène Donzelot	France	47.30	x	49.69	x	50.54	49.08	50.54	
9	Ionela Vartolomei	Romania	49.26	48.76	49.00				49.26	
10	Pauline Pousse	France	48.90	45.75	48.85				48.90	
11	Anita Márton	Hungary	48.33	48.56	x				48.56	
12	Kateřina Klausová	Czech Republic	47.95	x	48.09				48.09	

=== Qualifications ===
16 July
Qualifying 53.00 or 12 best to the Final

==== Group A ====
Rank	Name	Nationality	Result	Notes
1	Viktoriya Bolbat	Ukraine	51.98	q
2	Eden Francis	United Kingdom	51.83	q
3	Pauline Pousse	France	51.83	q
4	Yevgeniya Pecherina	Russia	51.77	q
5	Ionela Vartolomei	Romania	49.52	q
6	Kateřina Klausová	Czech Republic	49.28	q
7	Anna-Katharina Weller	Germany	49.27	
8	Katalin Császár	Hungary	45.93	
9	Elinor Forssander	Sweden	42.84	

==== Group B ====
Rank	Name	Nationality	Result	Notes
1	Sofia Larsson	Sweden	54.08	Q
2	Vera Karmishina	Russia	52.70	q
3	Coralie Glatre	France	52.46	q
4	Jade Nicholls	United Kingdom	50.60	q
5	Anita Márton	Hungary	50.01	q
6	Irène Donzelot	France	49.82	q
7	Dace Šteinerte	Latvia	47.46	
8	Dilek Esmer	Turkey	47.27	
9	Marta Jaworowska	Poland	47.09	
10	Elina Mattila	Finland	45.62	

== Participation ==
According to an unofficial count, 19 athletes from 13 countries participated in the event.

- Czech Republic (1)
- Finland (1)
- France (3)
- Germany (1)
- Hungary (2)
- Latvia (1)
- Poland (1)
- Romania (1)
- Russia (2)
- Sweden (2)
- Turkey (1)
- Ukraine (1)
- United Kingdom (2)
