= Athletics at the 2026 Commonwealth Games – Women's discus throw =

Women's discus throw at the 2026 Commonwealth Games
- Venue: Scotstoun Stadium, Glasgow
- Dates: 30 July (final)
- Winning distance: 61.66 m

Medalists
gold medal	Samantha Hall	Jamaica
silver medal	Julia Tunks	Canada
bronze medal	Seema Kaliramna	India

The women's discus throw at the 2026 Commonwealth Games, as part of the athletics programme, took place at Scotstoun Stadium on 30 July 2026. The event was held as a direct final.

== Records ==
Prior to this competition, the existing world, Commonwealth and Commonwealth Games records were as follows:

Women's Discus throw
World record	76.80 m	Gabriele Reinsch (GDR)	9 Jul 1988	Neubrandenburg, East Germany
Commonwealth record	69.64 m	Dani Stevens (AUS)	13 Aug 2017	London, United Kingdom
Games record	68.26 m	Dani Stevens (AUS)	12 April 2018	Gold Coast, Australia

== Schedule ==
The schedule was as follows:

Date	Time	Round
30 July 2026	19:00	Final

All times are British Summer Time (UTC+1)

== Results ==
=== Final ===
The direct final was scheduled for the evening of 30 July.

Rank	Name	1	2	3	4	5	6	Result	Notes
1st place, gold medalist(s)	Samantha Hall (JAM)	x	59.27	x	60.95	61.66	x	61.66	
2nd place, silver medalist(s)	Julia Tunks (CAN)	58.21	60.67	x	55.96	54.06	x	60.67	
3rd place, bronze medalist(s)	Seema Kaliramna (IND)	x	57.32	58.65	x	x	x	58.65	
4	Nidhi Rani (IND)	53.19	55.67	57.10	55.07	53.82	55.39	57.10	
5	Nora Monie (CMR)	55.37	54.51	56.81	55.20	56.38	11.18	56.81	
6	Obiageri Amaechi (NGR)	53.68	x	53.44	x	x	51.91	53.68	
7	Tiara Derosa (BER)	47.91	49.52	x	46.43	x	46.53	49.52	
8	Feryal Farooq (PAK)	35.29	x	x	35.97	37.41	38.66	38.66	SB
