= 2013 Asian Athletics Championships – Women's discus throw =

The women's discus throw at the 2013 Asian Athletics Championships was held at the Shree Shiv Chhatrapati Sports Complex on 3 July.

== Results ==
Rank	Name	Nationality	#1	#2	#3	#4	#5	#6	Result	Notes
1st place, gold medalist(s)	Su Xinyue	China	54.55	55.88	x	55.29	x	55.32	55.88	
2nd place, silver medalist(s)	Jiang Fengjing	China	x	55.57	55.70	x	x	51.99	55.70	
3rd place, bronze medalist(s)	Li Tsai-Yi	Chinese Taipei	50.55	54.46	51.61	55.32	50.88	52.88	55.32	
4	Krishna Poonia	India	54.29	55.01	52.89	53.83	54.22	53.93	55.01	
5	Seema Antil	India	x	37.36	52.40	52.58	48.22	50.78	52.58	
6	Kim Min	South Korea	44.95	x	x	45.66	49.22	46.74	49.22	
7	Navjeet Kaur Dhillon	India	39.28	41.45	45.33	x	44.25	42.95	45.33	
8	Mariya Telushkina	Kazakhstan	40.87	x	x	42.89	x	x	42.89	
