= Athletics at the 2022 Asian Games – Women's discus throw =

Women's discus throw at the 2022 Asian Games
- Venue: Hangzhou Olympic Expo Main Stadium
- Date: 1 October 2023
- Competitors: 8 from 6 nations

Medalists
gold medal	Feng Bin	China
silver medal	Jiang Zhichao	China
bronze medal	Seema Punia	India

The women's discus throw competition at the 2022 Asian Games took place on 1 October 2023 at the HOC Stadium, Hangzhou.

== Schedule ==
All times are China Standard Time (UTC+08:00)

Date	Time	Event
Sunday, 1 October 2023	20:05	Final

== Records ==
Prior to this competition, the existing world, Asian and Games records were as follows.

World Record	Gabriele Reinsch (GDR)	76.80	Neubrandenburg, East Germany	9 July 1988
Asian Record	Xiao Yanling (CHN)	71.68	Beijing, China	14 March 1992
Games Record	Li Yanfeng (CHN)	66.18	Guangzhou, China	23 November 2010

== Results ==
Rank	Athlete	Attempt						Result	Notes
Rank	Athlete	1	2	3	4	5	6	Result	Notes
1st place, gold medalist(s)	Feng Bin (CHN)	67.93	66.75	64.88	65.89	X	66.16	67.93	GR
2nd place, silver medalist(s)	Jiang Zhichao (CHN)	56.02	57.55	59.45	61.04	56.59	60.37	61.04	
3rd place, bronze medalist(s)	Seema Punia (IND)	53.95	52.77	57.47	58.62	X	56.41	58.62	
4	Subenrat Insaeng (THA)	X	58.26	X	X	X	X	58.26	
5	Shin Yu-jin (KOR)	53.62	X	54.86	55.48	X	54.13	55.48	
6	Jeong Ji-hye (KOR)	X	X	53.55	X	53.53	50.86	53.55	
7	Queenie Ting (MAS)	44.93	49.00	47.15	47.82	X	X	49.00	
8	Fatima Al-Hosani (UAE)	X	X	X	X	39.23	40.00	40.00	
