= Athletics at the 2014 Asian Games – Women's discus throw =

Women's discus throw at the 2014 Asian Games
- Venue: Incheon Asiad Main Stadium
- Dates: 29 September 2014
- Competitors: 11 from 8 nations

Medalists
gold medal	Seema Punia	India
silver medal	Lu Xiaoxin	China
bronze medal	Tan Jian	China

The women's discus throw event at the 2014 Asian Games was held at the Incheon Asiad Main Stadium, Incheon, South Korea on 29 September.

== Schedule ==
All times are Korea Standard Time (UTC+09:00)

Date	Time	Event
Monday, 29 September 2014	19:30	Final

== Records ==
Prior to this competition, the existing world, Asian and Games records were as follows.

World Record	Gabriele Reinsch (GDR)	76.80	Neubrandenburg, East Germany	9 July 1988
Asian Record	Xiao Yanling (CHN)	71.68	Beijing, China	14 March 1992
Games Record	Li Yanfeng (CHN)	66.18	Guangzhou, China	23 November 2010

== Results ==
Rank	Athlete	Attempt						Result	Notes
Rank	Athlete	1	2	3	4	5	6	Result	Notes
1st place, gold medalist(s)	Seema Punia (IND)	55.76	57.00	59.36	61.03	X	58.78	61.03	
2nd place, silver medalist(s)	Lu Xiaoxin (CHN)	X	54.70	X	58.87	59.35	X	59.35	
3rd place, bronze medalist(s)	Tan Jian (CHN)	X	57.29	55.47	57.08	59.03	58.73	59.03	
4	Krishna Poonia (IND)	X	53.73	55.57	X	X	55.27	55.57	
5	Subenrat Insaeng (THA)	53.55	54.77	52.24	49.88	52.48	52.81	54.77	
6	Li Tsai-yi (TPE)	X	52.46	51.33	52.37	X	51.33	52.46	
7	Jeong Ye-lim (KOR)	47.72	47.13	48.14	X	44.93	49.65	49.65	
8	Hiba Omar (SYR)	42.92	44.26	X	40.29	45.81	45.40	45.81	
9	Noora Salem Jasim (BRN)	35.24	37.04	43.98				43.98	
10	Kim Min (KOR)	X	X	41.79				41.79	
11	Asraar Al-Mannai (QAT)	X	29.27	35.19				35.19	
