= Samantha Hall (discus thrower) =

Jamaican athlete (born 1993)

Personal information
- Nationality: Jamaican
- Born: 19 April 1993 (age 33)
- Home town: Kingston, Jamaica

Sport
- Sport: Athletics
- Event: Discus throw
- University team: UTEP Miners
- Coached by: Rajindra Campbell

Achievements and titles
- Personal best: Discus: 66.39m (2026)
Medal record
Women's athletics
Representing Jamaica
Commonwealth Games
Gold medal – first place	2026 Glasgow	Discus throw
NACAC Championships
Gold medal – first place	2025 Freeport	Discus throw
Pan American Games
Bronze medal – third place	2023 Santiago	Discus throw

Samantha Hall (born 19 April 1993) is a Jamaican discus thrower and multiple-time national champion and the gold medalist at the 2026 Commonwealth Games and 2025 NACAC Championships.

== Early life ==
Hall attended St Jago High School and the University of Texas El Paso.

== Career ==
Hall won her first Jamaican national title in June 2021 in Kingston, Jamaica, throwing a personal best distance of 62.94 metres to cause an upset to defeat Jamaican national record holder Shadae Lawrence.

She won the Jamaican national title again in Kingston in June 2022. She made her debut at a global event competing in the discus at the 2022 World Athletics Championships in Eugene, Oregon. She placed fifth at the 2022 NACAC Championships in Nassau, The Bahamas in August 2022.

She retained her Jamaican national title in 2023 with a throw of 61.40 metres. She competed for Jamaica at the 2023 World Athletics Championships in Budapest where she achieved a best throw of 58.43 metres. She was a bronze medalist at the 2023 Pan American Games in Santiago with a throw of 59.14 metres.

In May 2024, she was announced as one of five athletes to benefit from sponsorship by the Jamaican Olympic Association. She competed at the 2024 Summer Olympics in Paris.

She won her fourth Jamaican national title in Kingston in June 2025 with a throw of 60.94 metres. She was named in the Jamaican squad for the 2025 NACAC Championships, winning the gold medal with a throw of 61.19 metres to finish ahead of Gabi Jacobs of the United States and Julia Tunks of Canada. In September 2025, she competed at the 2025 World Athletics Championships in Tokyo, Japan, reaching the final and placing twelfth overall.

On 30 July 2026, Hall won the gold medal in the discus throw at the 2026 Commonwealth Games in Glasgow, Scotland, making a fifth round throw of 61.66m to win ahead of Julia Tunks.
