= 2023 Asian Athletics Championships – Women's discus throw =

Women's discus throw at the 2023 Asian Athletics Championships
- Venue: National Stadium
- Location: Bangkok, Thailand
- Dates: 14 July
- Competitors: 7 from 4 nations
- Winning distance: 66.42 m CR

Medalists
| gold medal | Feng Bin | China |
| silver medal | Wang Fang | China |
| bronze medal | Subenrat Insaeng | Thailand |

The women's discus throw event at the 2023 Asian Athletics Championships was held on 14 July.

== Records ==
Records before the 2023 Asian Athletics Championships
| Record | Athlete (nation) | Distance (m) | Location | Date |
|---|---|---|---|---|
| World record | Gabriele Reinsch (GDR) | 76.80 | Neubrandenburg, East Germany | 9 July 1988 |
| Asian record | Xiao Yanling (CHN) | 71.68 | Beijing, China | 14 March 1992 |
| Championship record | Feng Bin (CHN) | 65.36 | Doha, Qatar | 24 April 2019 |
| World leading | Valarie Allman (USA) | 70.25 | San Diego, United States | 7 April 2023 |
| Asian leading | Feng Bin (CHN) | 66.81 | Shenyang, China | 27 June 2023 |

== Results ==
| Rank | Name | Nationality | #1 | #2 | #3 | #4 | #5 | #6 | Result | Notes |
|---|---|---|---|---|---|---|---|---|---|---|
| 1st place, gold medalist(s) | Feng Bin | China | 65.04 | 66.42 | 64.22 | x | x | 63.72 | 66.42 | |
| 2nd place, silver medalist(s) | Wang Fang | China | 56.10 | x | 58.33 | 56.69 | 58.49 | 57.96 | 58.49 | |
| 3rd place, bronze medalist(s) | Subenrat Insaeng | Thailand | 55.80 | x | x | x | x | 55.80 | 55.80 | |
| 4 | Maki Saito | Japan | x | x | 54.19 | x | 53.20 | 52.34 | 54.19 | |
| 5 | Nanaka Kori | Japan | x | x | x | x | 53.72 | x | 53.72 | |
| 6 | Queenie Ting Kung Ni | Malaysia | 47.69 | 46.38 | 48.09 | x | 49.30 | 48.87 | 49.30 | |
| 7 | Nur Atiqah Sufiah Hanizam | Malaysia | 42.03 | 42.85 | x | 41.79 | 43.55 | x | 43.55 | |
