= Radha Swami Satsang, Dinod =

Indian spiritual organisation

- Official logo of the Swami Satsang Dinod

Religions
- Radha Soami

Website
- https://www.radhaswamidinod.org

Radha Swami Satsang, Dinod (RSSD) is an Indian spiritual organisation with its headquarters in Dinod village in the Bhiwani district of Haryana state. It promotes the Radha Swami sect that was founded by Shiv Dayal Singh on Basant-Panchami day (a spring festival) in January 1861. The Radha Swami Satsang at Dinod (RSSD) was founded by Tarachand.

== Media evangelism ==
Satsangs of the present master, Kanwar Saheb, are broadcast daily on various Indian spiritual television channels, such as Santvani Channel.

Saheb's satsangs are also published in leading Hindi newspapers such as Dainik Bhaskar, Dainik Jagran, Haribhoomi and Punjab Kesari.

== Lineage of gurus ==
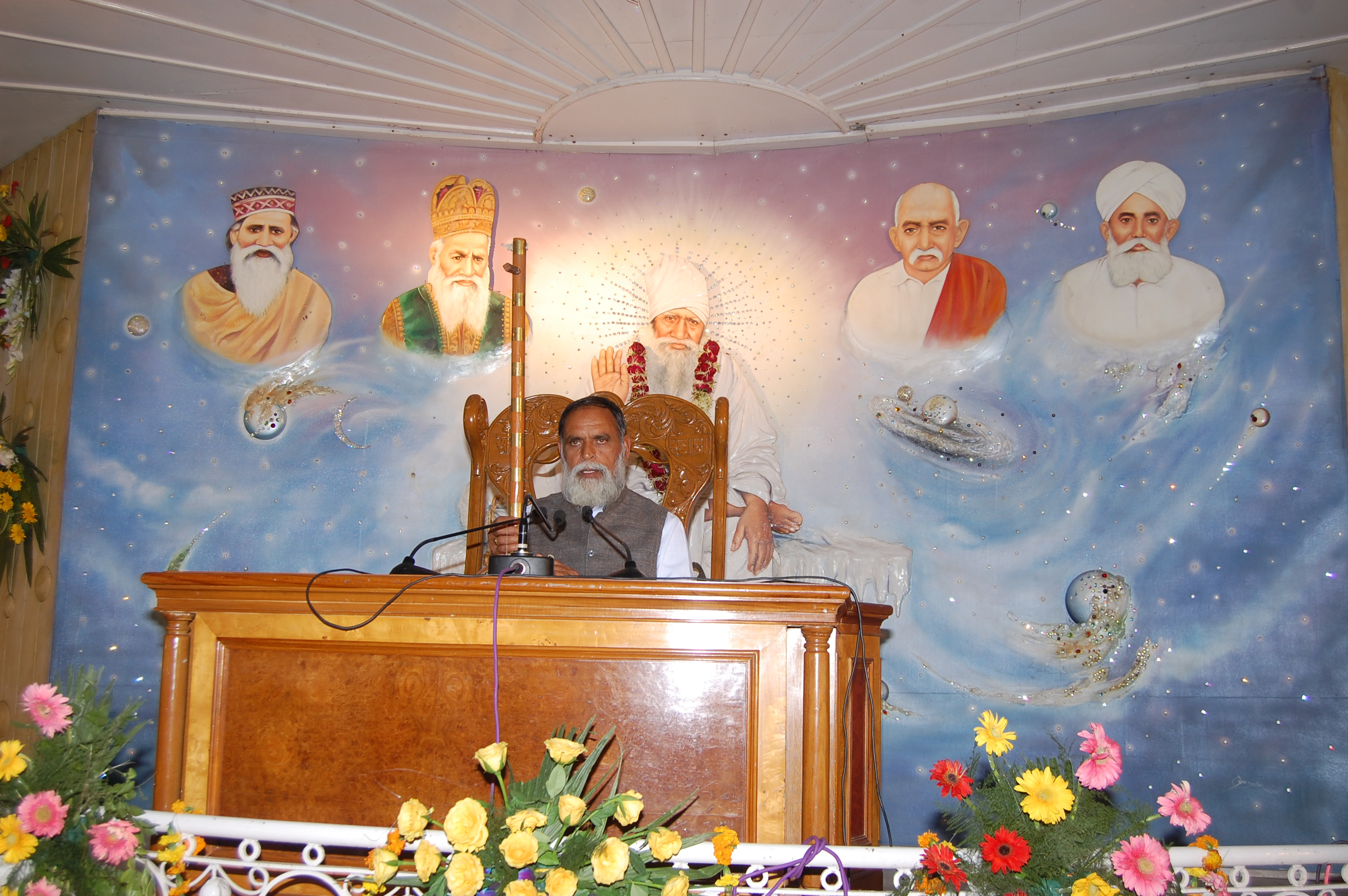
Kanwar Saheb giving Satsang at Bhiwani Ashram. Picture also depicts previous five gurus of Radha Swami Satsang, Dinod

The lineage of gurus in Radha Swami Satsang at Dinod is

- 1st Guru: Shiv Dayal Singh (August 1818 - June 1878)
- 2nd Guru: Salig Ram (March 1829 - December 1898)
- 3rd Guru: Maharishi Shiv Brat Lal (February 1860 - February 1939)
- 4th Guru: Ram Singh Arman (September 1895 - 1976)
- 5th Guru: Tarachand (August 1925 - January 1997)
- 6th Guru: Kanwar Saheb (March 1948 – Present)

== Star Monument (Samadhi Sthal) ==
A magnificent architecture, star monument is the Samadhi Sthal of 5th Radha Swami Guru, Tarachand who is renowned as Bade Maharaj Ji. This hexagonal structure is constructed in star shape at the elevated height of 6 feet from ground. The monument is 88 feet tall erected without any pillars and columns. This is amazing piece of architecture, that entire building is not having support of concrete pillars. A creative garden is also surrounding this Samadhi which depicts beauty of this place especially under lights.

Star monument is one of the most breathtaking buildings in India. This building houses the holy samadhi of Param Sant Huzur Tara Chand Ji maharaj fondly called ' Bade Maharaj Ji ', by his followers. This building is situated in the Radhaswami Satsang bhawan Complex, Dinod, about 11 km from Bhiwani, Haryana.

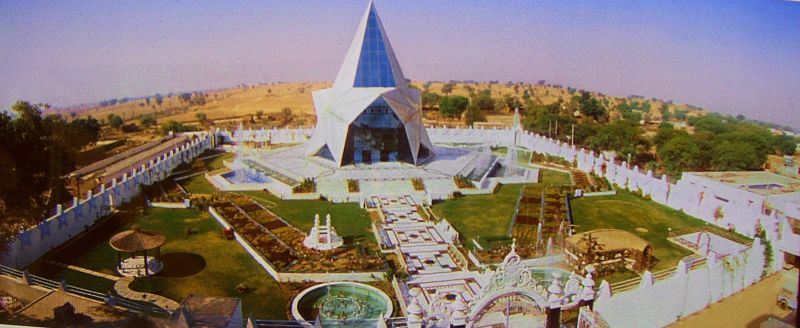
Star Monument (Samadhi Sthal of Bade Maharaj Ji) in Radha Swami Satsang Dinod Ashram.

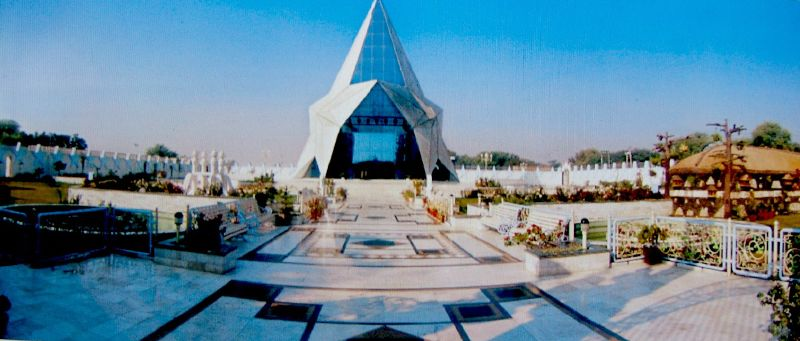

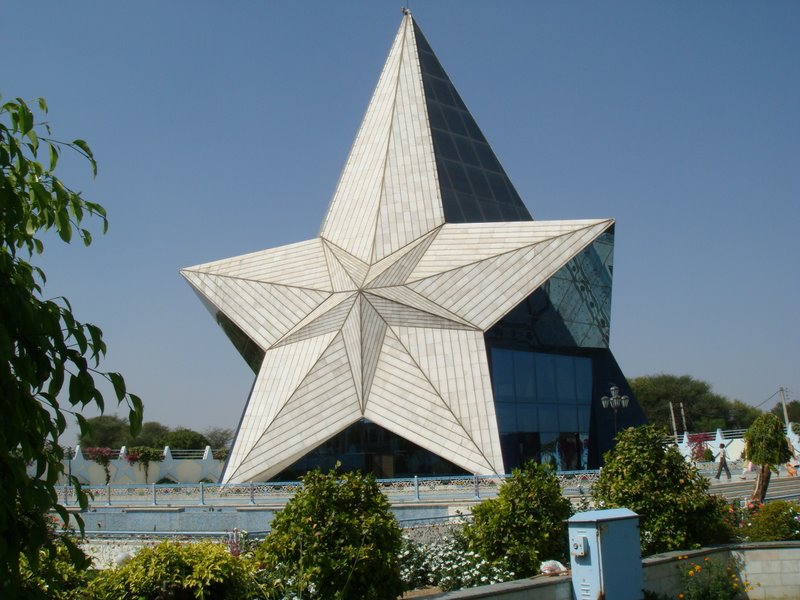

== See also ==
- Sant Mat
