= Seema Kaliramna =

Indian discus thrower (born 1999)

Personal information
- Born: 25 February 1999 (age 27) Dinod, Haryana, India

Sport
- Sport: Athletics
- Event: Discus throw
- Club: Inspire Institute of Sport

Achievements and titles
- Personal best: 59.88 m (2026)
Medal record
Women's athletics
Representing India
Commonwealth Games
Bronze medal – third place	2026 Glasgow	Discus throw
South Asian Championships
Gold medal – first place	2025 Ranchi	Discus throw

Seema Kaliramna (born 25 February 1999) is an Indian discus thrower. She won the bronze medal at the 2026 Commonwealth Games at the gold medal at the 2025 South Asian Championships.

== Early life ==
Seema was born on 25 February 1999 in Dinod, Bhiwani in the state of Haryana. Her father, who worked in the Indian Army, was a basketball player and javelin thrower, and encouraged her to take up sports. During her school years, she competed in various sports including boxing, kabaddi, and wrestling. She later took up discus throw and is coached by her husband, Ravinder Kaliramna, who is a former discus thrower himself. She is pursuing her PhD in Physical education at Chaudhary Bansi Lal University.

== Career ==
Seema made her international debut at the 2025 Asian Championships in Gumi, throwing 56.15 m she narrowly missed the podium with a fourth-place finish. At the 2025 South Asian Championships in Ranchi, she won the gold medal with a best effort of 55.14 m.

She registered a personal best throw of 59.73 m at the 2026 National Inter-State Championships in Bhubaneswar. Later at the 2026 Commonwealth Games in Glasgow, she won the bronze medal with throw of 58.65 m. She fouled four of her six throws and recorded her best mark in her third attempt. She registered her new personal best throw of 59.88m at 2026 Asian Games

== International competitions ==
Representing India
Year	Competition	Host	Position	Result
2025	Asian Championships	Gumi, South Korea	4th	56.15 m
2025	South Asian Championships	Ranchi, India	1st	55.14 m
2026	Commonwealth Games	Glasgow, Scotland	3rd	58.65 m
