= 2015 Asian Athletics Championships – Women's discus throw =

The women's discus throw event at the 2015 Asian Athletics Championships was held on June 4.

== Results ==
Rank	Name	Nationality	#1	#2	#3	#4	#5	#6	Result	Notes
1st place, gold medalist(s)	Su Xinyue	China	61.49	63.51	62.68	62.46	63.43	63.90	63.90	
2nd place, silver medalist(s)	Tan Jian	China	59.59	60.84	62.97	59.50	60.00	x	62.97	
3rd place, bronze medalist(s)	Lu Xiaoxin	China	62.30	61.39	62.16	61.11	x	58.32	62.30	
4	Subenrat Insaeng	Thailand	55.96	x	57.19	58.47	56.85	56.55	58.47	
5	Li Tsai-Yi	Chinese Taipei	53.08	x	46.26	50.51	51.34	51.88	53.08	
6	Kaur Dhillon	India	x	49.52	51.66	x	x	x	51.66	
7	Fateme Khayati	Iran	45.54	45.78	48.64	47.31	42.50	45.32	48.64	
8	Eriko Nakata	Japan	47.73	46.53	48.13	48.05	47.63	43.96	48.13	
9	Mariya Telushkina	Kazakhstan	x	41.43	41.07				41.43	
