= Ayman Ratova =

Kazakhstani race walker (born 1991)

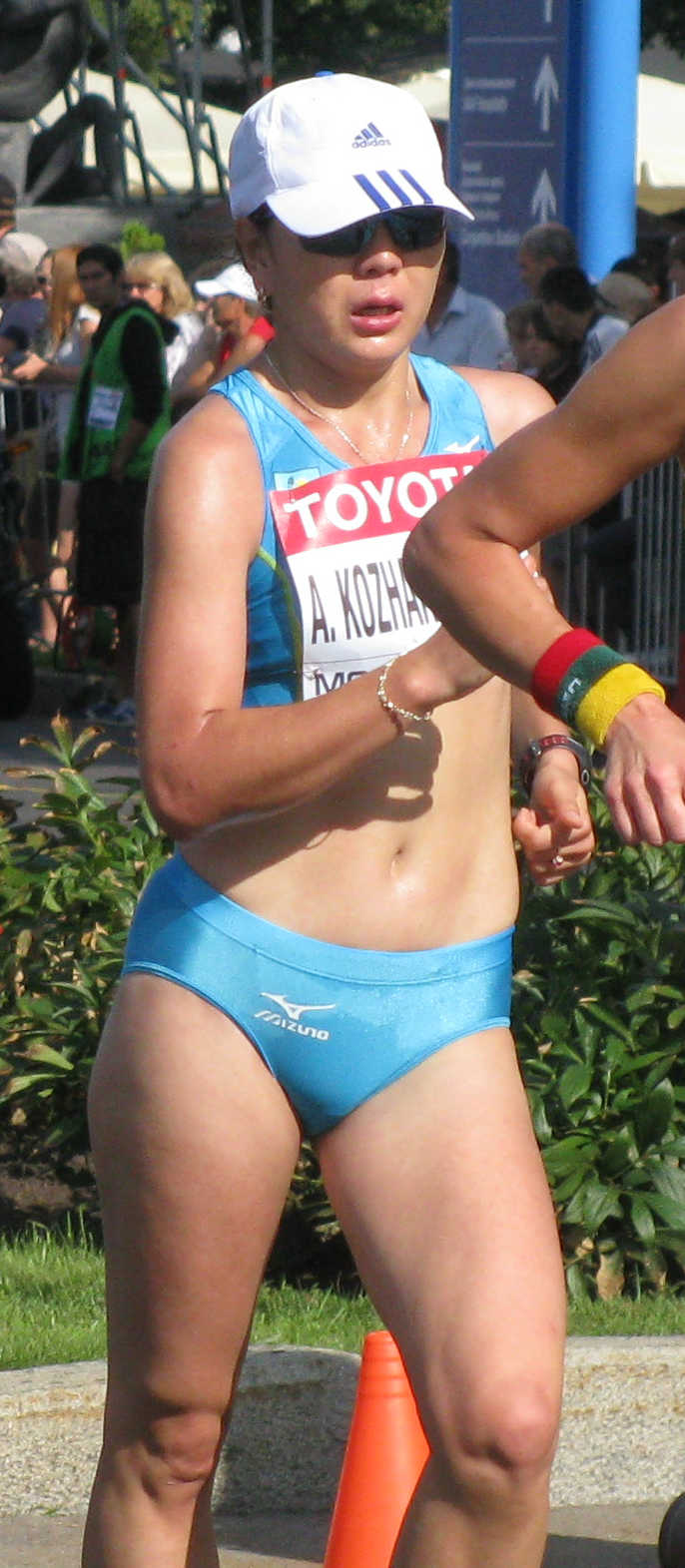

Personal information
- Born: 23 April 1991 (age 35) Taldykorgan, Kazakhstan
- Height: 168 cm (5 ft 6 in)
- Weight: 57 kg (126 lb)
Medal record
Asian Junior Championships
Bronze medal – third place	2010 Hanoi	10,000 m walk

Ayman Ratova (Айман Ратова, born 23 April 1991 in Taldykorgan), née Kozhakhmetova (Кожахметова), is a Kazakhstani race walker. She competed in the 20 km kilometres event at the 2012 Summer Olympics. Her twin Sholpan also competed in that event at the 2012 Olympics.

She served a 2-year competition ban for the use of prohibited substances, EPO and testosterone, lasting from 18 August 2013 to 11 September 2015.

She also represented Kazakhstan at the 2020 Summer Olympics.
