= 2019 Asian Athletics Championships – Women's discus throw =

Overview of 2019 Asian Athletic Championship Women's discus throw

Women's discus throw at the 2019 Asian Athletics Championships
- Venue: Khalifa International Stadium
- Location: Doha, Qatar
- Dates: 24 April
- Competitors: 9 from 6 nations
- Winning distance: 65.36 m CR, PB

Medalists
gold medal	Feng Bin	China
silver medal	Chen Yang	China
bronze medal	Song Jiayuan	Thailand

The women's discus throw at the 2019 Asian Athletics Championships was held on 24 April.

== Records ==
Records before the 2019 Asian Athletics Championships
Record	Athlete (nation)	Distance (m)	Location	Date
World record	Gabriele Reinsch (GDR)	76.80	Neubrandenburg, East Germany	9 July 1988
Asian record	Xiao Yanling (CHN)	71.68	Beijing, China	14 March 1992
Championship record	Song Aimin (CHN)	65.15	Incheon, South Korea	2 September 2005
World leading	Valarie Allman (USA)	67.15	Chula Vista, United States	11 April 2019
Asian leading	No distances recorded			

== Results ==
Rank	Name	Nationality	#1	#2	#3	#4	#5	#6	Result	Notes
1st place, gold medalist(s)	Feng Bin	China	x	65.36	x	63.06	64.79	63.67	65.36	CR, PB
2nd place, silver medalist(s)	Chen Yang	China	56.08	59.81	x	x	60.75	61.87	61.87	SB
3rd place, bronze medalist(s)	Subenrat Insaeng	Thailand	x	53.43	58.20	54.84	57.97	x	58.20	
4	Navjeet Dhillon	India	53.76	55.57	54.15	x	57.47	x	57.47	SB
5	Kamal Preet Kaur	India	55.57	x	55.59	x	54.82	x	55.59	
6	Maki Saito	Japan	52.49	50.90	52.51	51.66	52.87	49.62	52.87	PB
7	Zhaleh Kardan	Iran	51.07	51.49	x	48.17	x	50.18	51.49	PB
8	Noora Salem Jasim	Bahrain	x	x	40.51	46.08	x	x	46.08	
	Nanaka Kori	Japan	x	x	x				NM	
