= Athletics at the 2013 Summer Universiade – Women's discus throw =

The women's discus throw event at the 2013 Summer Universiade was held on 8 July.

== Medalists ==
Gold	Silver	Bronze
Vera Ganeeva; Russia	Yelena Panova; Russia	Maryke Oberholzer; South Africa

== Results ==
=== Final ===
Rank	Athlete	Nationality	#1	#2	#3	#4	#5	#6	Result	Notes
1st place, gold medalist(s)	Vera Ganeeva	Russia	57.01	57.57	61.26	-	x	x	61.26	
2nd place, silver medalist(s)	Yelena Panova	Russia	56.86	49.57	x	x	56.83	54.17	56.86	
3rd place, bronze medalist(s)	Maryke Oberholzer	South Africa	54.09	52.80	50.43	52.81	50.70	x	54.09	
4	Subenrat Insaeng	Thailand	48.60	50.01	49.77	50.92	51.69	53.40	53.40	SB
5	Katri Hirvonen	Finland	x	49.30	x	x	x	52.83	52.83	
6	Terina Keenan	New Zealand	x	49.08	49.42	x	x	52.38	52.38	
7	Sanna Kämäräinen	Finland	51.41	x	x	50.31	50.08	x	51.41	
8	Alix Kennedy	Australia	48.35	49.79	47.85	47.55	49.30	x	49.79	
9	Kimberley Mulhall	Australia	47.39	48.25	48.53				48.53	
10	Ayumi Takahashi	Japan	47.52	x	x				47.52	
11	Rayann Chin	Canada	x	46.34	46.44				46.44	
12	Ivana Gallardo	Chile	x	45.94	x				45.94	
13	Charlene Engelbrecht	Namibia	39.98	45.69	x				45.69	
14	Fadya El Kasaby	Egypt	37.66	39.52	40.07				40.07	
15	Janeth Acan	Uganda	26.11	33.18	33.31				33.31	
16	Devni Madurapperuma	Sri Lanka	28.87	32.65	31.79				32.65	
	Li Wen-Hua	Chinese Taipei							DNS	
