= Dilek Esmer =

Turkish discus thrower

Dilek Esmer (born 15 January 1988) is a retired Turkish discus thrower. She tested positive for doping, and was suspended from competing between June 2013 and December 2015.

== Biography ==
She finished eighth at the 2005 World Youth Championships. She also competed at the 2009 European U23 Championships and the 2012 European Championships without reaching the final.

Esmer became the Turkish champion three times. At the 2013 Turkish championships, she tested positive for doping, and was suspended between June 2013 and December 2015.

Her personal best throw was 57.56 metres, achieved in March 2012 in Mersin.
