= Lu Xiaoxin =

Chinese discus thrower (born 1989)

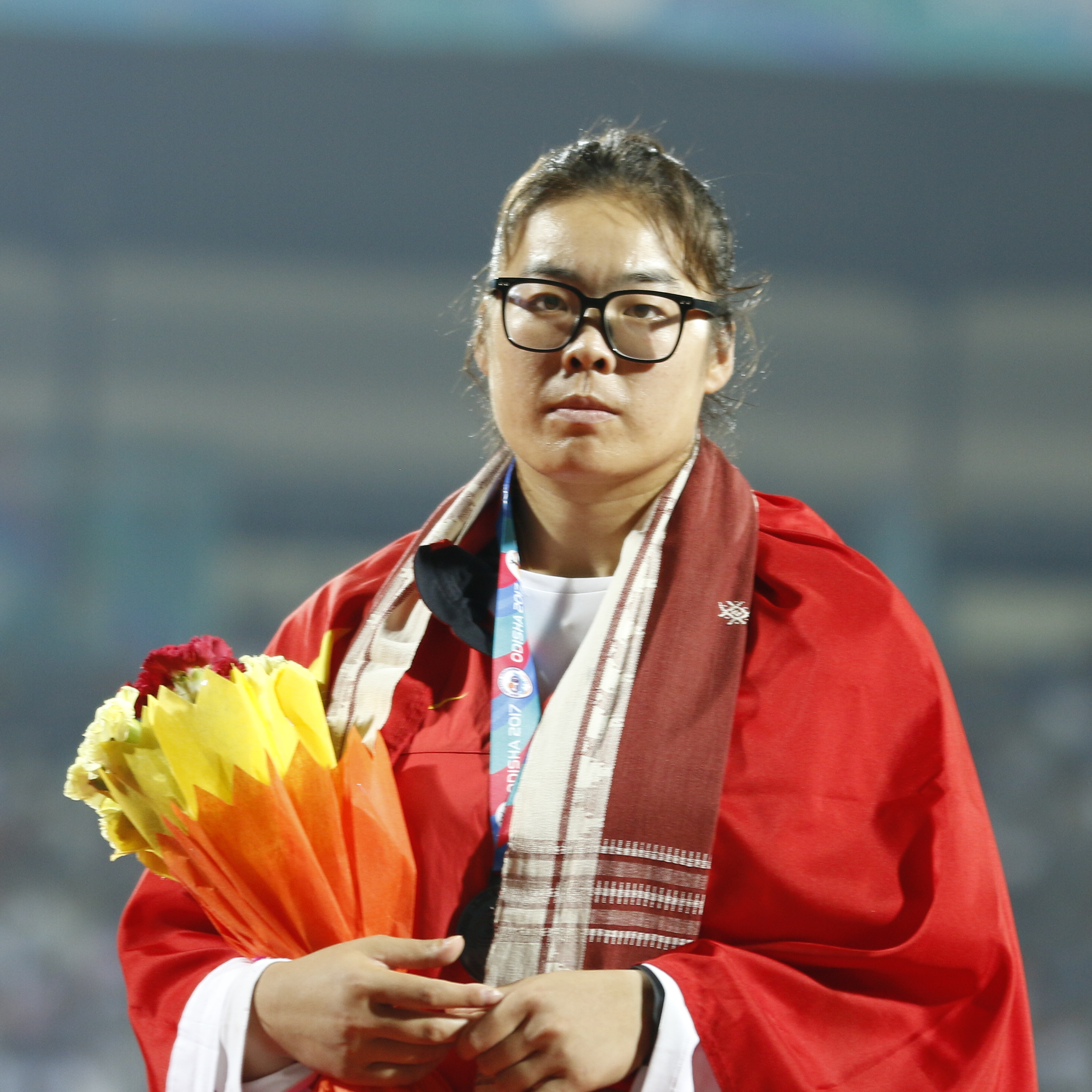
- Lu Xiaoxin taking Bronze in 2017 in India

Personal information
- Born: 22 February 1989 (age 37)
- Height: 184 cm (6 ft 0 in)
- Weight: 90 kg (198 lb)

Sport
- Country: China
- Sport: Track and field
- Event: Discus throw
- Updated on 29 August 2015

Lu Xiaoxin (born 22 February 1989) is a Chinese athlete specialising in the discus throw. She competed at the 2015 World Championships in Beijing without qualifying for the final.

Her personal best in the event is 63.27 metres set in Shenyang in 2013.

== Competition record ==
Year	Competition	Venue	Position	Event	Notes
Representing China
2014	Asian Games	Incheon, South Korea	2nd	Discus throw	59.35 m
2015	Asian Championships	Wuhan, China	3rd	Discus throw	62.30 m
2015	World Championships	Beijing, China	21st (q)	Discus throw	58.55 m
2017	Asian Championships	Bhubaneswar, India	3rd	Discus throw	55.27 m
