= Gu Siyu =

Chinese athlete (born 1993)

Gu Siyu (Chinese: 谷思雨; born 11 February 1993) is a Chinese track and field athlete who competes in the discus throw and formerly the shot put. She holds a discus personal best of 67.86 m (222 ft 7 1/2 in) and a shot put best of 16.59 m (54 ft 5 in). She was a double Asian junior champion in 2010 and represented her country at the 2013 World Championships in Athletics.

== Career ==
Gu began to make her first impact at the age of sixteen, when she took the discus title at the 2009 Australian Youth Olympic Festival. She threw beyond fifty metres in the discus for the first time that year. International medals followed at the 2010 Asian Junior Athletics Championships where she claimed a shot put/discus double for China. She took the silver medal in the shot put later that year at the Summer Youth Olympics.

The focus of her 2011 season was the Chinese City Games and she was the shot put runner-up behind Guo Tianqian, who was the world youth champion that year. She was also runner-up in the discus competition and ended that tournament with improved bests of 16.59 m (54 ft 5 in) and 56.12 m (184 ft 1 1/4 in) in the throws. Both these marks ranked her in the top five juniors globally that year.

She marked herself as the best junior discus thrower in the country in 2012 by winning the Chinese junior championships with a big personal best of 60.59 m (198 ft 9 1/4 in). She was far off this form at the 2012 World Junior Championships in Athletics and her best of nearly five metres less was only enough for fifth.

Gu, dropping the shot put to focus on discus throwing instead, placed herself among the senior elite in the 2013 season. She began with a new best of 60.93 m (199 ft 10 3/4 in) on the Chinese Athletics Grand Prix circuit. She travelled to compete in Germany in May and the 20-year-old surprised with a large throw of 67.86 m (222 ft 7 1/2 in), raising her to second on the seasonal lists behind the dominant Sandra Perković. She earned her first senior selection for China as a result, but at the 2013 World Championships in Athletics she failed to register a valid mark and dropped out at the qualifying stage. She had a quiet 2014, her best being a throw of 60.78 m (199 ft 4 3/4 in) in Jinan.

== Personal bests ==
- Shot put – 16.59 m (54 ft 5 in) (2011)
- Discus throw – 67.86 m (222 ft 7 1/2 in) (2013)
- Shot put (indoor) – 16.34 m (53 ft 7 1/4 in) (2012)

== International competitions ==
Year	Competition	Venue	Position	Event	Notes
2010	Asian Junior Championships	Hanoi, Vietnam	1st	Shot put	
2010	Asian Junior Championships	Hanoi, Vietnam	1st	Discus throw	
2010	Youth Olympics	Singapore	2nd	Shot put	
2012	World Junior Championships	Barcelona, Spain	5th	Discus throw	
2013	World Championships	Moscow, Russia	—	Discus throw	No mark
