= Mariya Telushkina =

Kazakhstani discus thrower

Personal information
- Born: 3 April 1994 (age 31)
- Height: 1.78 m (5 ft 10 in)
- Weight: 90 kg (198 lb)

Sport
- Sport: Athletics
- Event: Discus throw
- Coached by: Tatyana Lesovaya

Mariya Telushkina (Kazakh: Мария Телушкина; born 3 April 1994) is a Kazakhstani athlete specialising in the discus throw. She represented her country at the 2016 Summer Olympics without qualifying for the final.

Her personal best in the event is 61.20 metres set is Tashkent in 2016.

== International competitions ==
Year	Competition	Venue	Position	Notes
Representing Kazakhstan
2012	Asian Junior Championships	Colombo, Sri Lanka	6th	40.11 m
2013	Asian Championships	Pune, India	8th	42.89 m
2015	Asian Championships	Wuhan, China	9th	41.43 m
2016	Olympic Games	Rio de Janeiro, Brazil	32nd (q)	45.33 m
