= Julia Tunks =

Canadian athlete

Personal information
- Born: 20 July 2006 (age 20)

Sport
- Sport: Athletics
- Event: Discus throw

Achievements and titles
- Personal bests: Discus: 63.58m (Walnut, 2026) NR; Shot put: 15.23m (Orlando, 2024)
Medal record
Women's athletics
Representing Canada
Commonwealth Games
Silver medal – second place	2026 Glasgow	Discus throw
NACAC Championships
Bronze medal – third place	2025 Freeport	Discus throw
Pan American U20 Championships
Gold medal – first place	2023 Mayagüez	Discus throw

Julia Tunks (born 20 July 2006) is a Canadian discus thrower and shot putter. She won the Canadian Athletics Championships in the discus throw in 2023, 2025 and 2026. In 2025, she also became the Canadian national record holder at the age of 18. She won the silver medal at the 2026 Commonwealth Games.

== Early life ==
From London, Ontario, she is the daughter of Lieja Koeman, who participated in the 2000 and 2004 Olympics in the shot put and three-time Olympian (1996, 2000, 2004) discus thrower Jason Tunks. She attended Oakridge Secondary School. She played soccer as a goalkeeper before focusing on athletics.

== Career ==
She won the Canadian Athletics Championships for the first time in 2023. She was a gold medalist at the 2023 Pan American U20 Athletics Championships in August 2023 in Mayagüez, Peru with a throw of 56.98 metres. She placed seventh overall at the 2024 World Athletics U20 Championships in Lima, Peru.

In April 2025, at the age of 18, she threw 62.95 metres for the discus throw in Ramona, Oklahoma to not only set a new personal best and break her own national under-20 record, but also break the senior Canadian national record which was previously set in 1979 by Carmen Ionesco. She won the Canadian Athletics Championships in Ottawa in 2025 with a championship record throw of 60.68 metres. She was a bronze medalist at the 2025 NACAC Championships in Freeport, The Bahamas.

In September 2025, she competed at the 2025 World Athletics Championships in Tokyo, Japan, without reaching the final.

In April 2026, Tunks set a new personal best and Canadian record of 63.58m to win at the Mt. SAC Relays in California, beating 2023 World Champion Laulauga Tausaga. On 30 July, Tunks won the silver medal in the discus throw at the 2026 Commonwealth Games in Glasgow, Scotland, having made a second round throw of 60.67m.

== Personal life ==
She is coached by her father, the Olympian Jason Tunks. Her younger sister Jenna also competes in athletics and won the Canadian U20 Championships in the discus throw in 2024 and 2025.
