= Nanaka Kori =

Japanese athlete

Personal information
- Born: 2 May 1997 (age 29) Osaka Prefecture, Japan
- Education: Kyushu Kyoritsu University
- Height: 1.71 m (5 ft 7 in)
- Weight: 75 kg (165 lb)

Sport
- Sport: Athletics
- Event(s): Shot put, discus throw

Nanaka Kori (郡 菜々佳, Kori Nanaka; born 2 May 1997) is a Japanese athlete competing in the shot put and discus throw. She represented her country in the discus at the 2019 World Championships in Doha without reaching the final.

Her personal best in the discus of 59.03 metres is the current national record.

== International competitions ==
Representing Japan
Year	Competition	Venue	Position	Event	Notes
2016	Asian Junior Championships	Ho Chi Minh City, Vietnam	1st	Shot put	15.89 m
2016	Asian Junior Championships	Ho Chi Minh City, Vietnam	2nd	Discus throw	48.04 m
2016	World U20 Championships	Bydgoszcz, Poland	13th (q)	Shot put	14.63 m
2016	World U20 Championships	Bydgoszcz, Poland	22nd (q)	Discus throw	45.46 m
2017	Universiade	Bhubaneswar, India	4th	Shot put	15.33 m
2017	Universiade	Bhubaneswar, India	8th	Discus throw	49.55 m
2019	Asian Championships	Doha, Qatar	4th	Shot put	15.68 m
2019	Asian Championships	Doha, Qatar	–	Discus throw	NM
2019	Universiade	Naples, Italy	13th (q)	Shot put	15.44 m
2019	Universiade	Naples, Italy	16th (q)	Discus throw	50.53 m
2019	World Championships	Doha, Qatar	29th (q)	Discus throw	48.82 m
2023	Asian Championships	Bangkok, Thailand	7th	Shot put	16.02 m
2023	Asian Championships	Bangkok, Thailand	5th	Discus throw	53.72 m
2025	Asian Championships	Gumi, South Korea	3rd	Discus throw	56.48 m
2025	World Championships	Tokyo, Japan	36th (q)	Discus throw	54.59 m

== Personal bests ==
Outdoor

- Shot put – 16.57 (Fukui 2017)
- Discus throw – 59.03 (Kitakyushu 2019) NR
