= Chen Yang (discus thrower) =

Chinese discus thrower (born 1991)

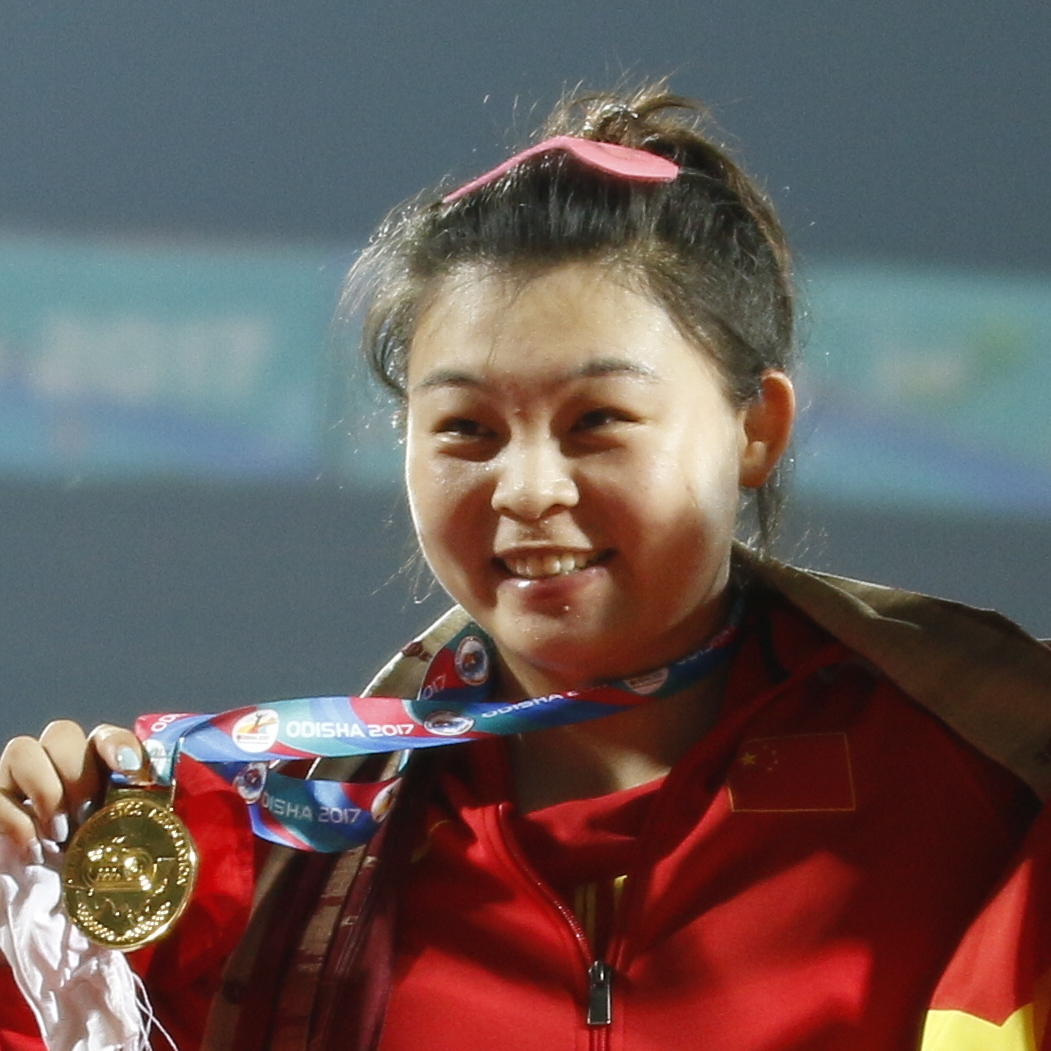
- Chen Yang taking gold in 2017

Personal information
- Nationality: Chinese
- Born: July 10, 1991 (age 35)
- Height: 1.80 m (5 ft 11 in)
- Weight: 97 kg (214 lb)

Sport
- Sport: Track and field
- Event: Discus throw

Achievements and titles
- Personal best: Discus throw: 67.03 m (2018)

Chen Yang (born 10 July 1991) is a Chinese track and field athlete who competes in the discus throw. She represented her country at the 2016 Rio Olympics, finishing seventh in the final. Her personal best is 67.03 m (219 ft 10 3/4 in), set in 2018.

== International competitions ==
Year	Competition	Venue	Position	Event	Notes
2016	Olympic Games	Rio de Janeiro, Brazil	7th	Discus throw	63.11 m
2017	Asian Championships	Bhubaneswar, India	1st	Discus throw	60.41 m
2017	World Championships	London, United Kingdom	10th	Discus throw	61.28 m
2018	Asian Games	Jakarta, Indonesia	1st	Discus throw	65.12 m
2019	Asian Championships	Doha, Qatar	2nd	Discus throw	61.87 m
2019	World Championships	Doha, Qatar	4th	Discus throw	63.38 m
2021	Olympic Games	Tokyo, Japan	10th	Discus throw	61.57 m
