= Ho Man Lok =

Hong Kong sprinter (born 1991)

Personal information
- Born: 27 September 1991 (age 34) Canada

Sport
- Sport: Track and field
Medal record
Representing Hong Kong
Summer Universiade
Bronze medal – third place	2011 Shenzhen	4x100m relay

Ho Man Lok (born September 27, 1991, in Canada) is a Hong Kong sprinter. He represented Hong Kong at the 2012 Summer Olympics as part of the men's 4 × 100 m relay team.
