= Yevgeniya Pecherina =

Russian discus thrower

Yevgeniya Pecherina (Russian: Евгения Печерина; born 9 May 1989) is a Russian former track and field athlete who specialises in the discus throw.

Mainly competing in national level competition, she gradually improved as a thrower, setting a best of 51.02 m (167 ft 4 1/2 in) at age nineteen, clearing 56.08 m (183 ft 11 3/4 in) in 2009, and then 58.94 m (193 ft 4 1/4 in) the following year at age twenty-one. In international competition, she took sixth place at the 2009 European Athletics U23 Championships.

She had a sudden marked improvement in the 2011 season, managing a personal best throw of 65.77 m (215 ft 9 1/4 in) in Krasnodar, which ranked her fifth globally that year. However, later that month, she gave a positive drug test for the banned anabolic steroid methandienone. She received a two year ban from the sport. Immediately prior to the end of her ban, she again gave a positive drug test, this time for Dehydrochloromethyltestosterone, another steroid. This resulted in a ten-year ban from the sport.

Pecherina was interviewed for a German documentary, Top-secret Doping: How Russia makes its Winners, shown on Das Erste in December 2014. She claimed that doping was widespread in Russia, with the majority of international athletes using performance-enhancing drugs, which were made freely available to them. The Russian Anti-Doping Agency and the Russian Athletics Federation both said that her statements were baseless. However, the federation president (and IAAF treasurer) Valentin Balakhnichev was implicated in the cover up of doping by Liliya Shobukhova (a prominent marathon runner), and he stepped down from his position while the investigation was ongoing.

== See also ==
- List of doping cases in athletics
