= Vera Karmishina-Ganeeva =

Russian discus thrower

Personal information
- Full name: Vera Aleksandrovna Ganeeva
- Born: 6 November 1988 (age 37) Kamyshin, Russian SFSR, Soviet Union
- Height: 1.78 m (5 ft 10 in)
- Weight: 105 kg (231 lb)

Sport
- Country: Russia
- Sport: Athletics
- Event: Discus
- Updated on 14 August 2012

Vera Aleksandrovna Ganeeva (Russian: Вера Александровна Ганеева) born 6 November 1988 in Kamyshin) is a Russian athlete. She represented Russia in discus at the 2012 Summer Olympics. She finished 23rd but was disqualified in 2017 after testing positive for turinabol. She was given a two-year ban. In February 2019, the Court of Arbitration for Sport handed her another two-year ban for doping, starting from 2 July 2018.

== Achievements ==
Year	Competition	Venue	Position	Event	Notes
Representing Russia
2007	European Junior Championships	Hengelo, Netherlands	1st	Discus throw	56.16 m
2009	European U23 Championships	Kaunas, Lithuania	2nd	Discus throw	54.48 m
2011	European Cup Winter Throwing	Sofia, Bulgaria	3rd	Discus throw	57.45 m
2011	Universiade	Shenzhen, China	4th	Discus throw	60.29 m
2012	Olympic Games	London, United Kingdom	DSQ	Discus throw	~~59.90 m~~
2013	Universiade	Kazan, Russia	DSQ	Discus throw	~~61.26 m~~
2013	World Championships	Moscow, Russia	DSQ	Discus throw	~~58.37 m~~

== See also ==
- List of doping cases in athletics
