= Dinod, Bhiwani =

Dinod
- Village
- Location in Haryana, India Dinod (India)
- Coordinates: 28.7932°N 76.0502°E
- Country: India
- State: Haryana
- District: Bhiwani
- Tehsil: Bhiwani

Area
  - Total: 38.25 km^{2} (14.77 sq mi)

Population (2011)
  - Total: 15,792
  - Rank: 1
  - Density: 412.9/km^{2} (1,069/sq mi)

Languages
  - Official: Hindi
- Time zone: UTC+5:30 (IST)
- PIN 127111: 127111
- Vehicle registration: Hr 16 And 61
- Website: www.dinod.in

Dinod is a village in the Bhiwani district of the Indian state of Haryana.

== Geography ==
Dinod is the largest village in the Tosham block, approximately 7km west of the district headquarters of Bhiwani. Talav (Indian Lake) called Dulasar Johad.

== Demographics ==
As of the 2011 Census, the village had 3,275 households with a total population of 15,792 of which 8,398 were male and 7,394 female. The village has 36 castes.

== Culture ==
Dinod's main temple is Baba Dhuni Wala and Baba Hanumaan Garhi.

Every year, millions of followers visit Satsang Bhavan to attend daily satsangs. Bhandaras and Satsangs (public feast and spiritual discourse) are organized on a large scale on Guru Purnima and Avtaran Diwas (Bade Maharaj Ji) attended by millions of devotees and villagers.

== Governance ==
The headquarters of Radha Swami Satsang Dinod are located in Dinod. For political representational purposes the village is part of Tosham Assembly constituency and the Bhiwani-Mahendragarh Lok Sabha constituency.

== Education ==
The 5 main schools are:

- B.R.D Secondary School
- Government Boys' High School
- Government Girls Senior Secondary Schoo
- Saraswati Vidya Vihar High School
- ND International School

== Notables ==
- Chhelu Ram - Victoria Cross winner is also from this Village
- Paramjeet Samota - local boxer who won a gold medal in the Delhi Commonwealth Games.
