= Shelbi Vaughan =

American discus thrower (born 1994)

Personal information
- Full name: Shelbi JoDae Vaughan
- Nationality: American
- Born: August 24, 1994 (age 31) Weatherford, Texas, U.S.
- Height: 6 ft 2 in (1.88 m)

Sport
- Sport: Track and field
- Event: Discus throw
- College team: Texas A&M University

Achievements and titles
- Personal bests: Discus throw 64.52 m (211 ft 8 in) Weight throw 18.73 m (61 ft 5 1/4 in); Hammer throw 54.11 m (177 ft 6 1/4 in) as of February 19, 2016
Medal record
Women's athletics
Representing the United States
Athletics at the Summer Olympics
	Rio de Janeiro Olympics	Discus
World Championships
	Beijing World Championships	Discus
World Junior Championships
Bronze medal – third place	Barcelona World Junior Championships	Discus
NACAC U23
Gold medal – first place	San Salvador NACAC U23	Discus
Pan American Junior Championships
Gold medal – first place	Miramar Pan American Junior Championships	Discus
World Youth Championships
Bronze medal – third place	Lille World Youth Championships	Discus

Shelbi JoDae Vaughan (born August 24, 1994) is an American track and field athlete. She is a specialist in the discus throw.

== World Competition ==
Shelbi competed at the Athletics at the 2016 Summer Olympics - Women's discus throw and threw 53.33 m (174 ft 11 1/2 in) to place 29th. She competed at the 2015 World Championships in Beijing narrowly missing the final. In addition, she was bronze medals at the 2012 World Junior Championships and the 2011 World Youth Championships.

== NCAA ==
Vaughan's Texas A&M personal best in the discus is 64.52 m (211 ft 8 in) set in Starkville in 2015. In addition, she has a personal best of 15.78 m (51 ft 9 1/4 in) in the shot put at Texas A&M University.

Vaughan won 2013 NCAA Division I Southeastern Conference Discus title as a freshman. She also won 2013 Texas Relays, Oregon Pepsi Invitational, Louisiana State University Alumni Gold Invite, John McDonnell Invitational at University of Arkansas Discus titles.

Vaughan placed third in Discus at 2014 USA Outdoor Track and Field Championships. Vaughan won 2014 NCAA Division I NCAA Outdoor Women's Track and Field Championship Discus title. Shelbi Vaughan won 2014 NCAA Division I Southeastern Conference Discus title. She also won 2014 Texas Relays, Stanford Invitational, Sun Angel Track Classic, Texas State Bobcats Classics Discus titles.

Vaughan placed third in Discus at 2015 USA Outdoor Track and Field Championships. Vaughan won 2015 NCAA Division I NCAA Outdoor Women's Track and Field Championship Discus title. Shelbi Vaughan won 2015 NCAA Division I Southeastern Conference Discus title. She also won 2015 Texas Relays, Stanford Invitational, Sun Angel Track Classic, TCU Horned Frogs Invite Discus titles.

Vaughan placed second in Discus at 2016 United States Olympic Trials (track and field) to qualify for Athletics at the 2016 Summer Olympics. Vaughan placed sixth in Discus at 2016 NCAA Division I NCAA Outdoor Women's Track and Field Championship. Vaughan won 2016 Southeastern Conference, UT San Antonio, Texas Relays, UCLA, Baylor and LSU Discus titles. Vaughan placed 6th in the Weight throw at 2016 SEC Indoor Track & Field Championships.

== High school ==
Vaughan was the 2012 Track and Field News "High School Athlete of the Year".

Vaughan's senior season's best of 50-1.25 in the Shot put and 198-9 in the Discus fifth and first respectively in 2012. She won University Interscholastic League Texas State championships in discus titles in 2011 and 2012. She won 2012 Discus throw USA Junior Outdoor Track and Field Championships title with a 60.59 m (198 ft 9 1/4 in) and set the Discus throw American Junior record. She placed 4th in 2012 United States Olympic Trials (track and field) just weeks after graduating high school with a 59.68 m (195 ft 9 1/2 in) 3rd place American record holder Suzy Powell-Roos did not have a qualifying mark for the Olympics and neither did Vaughn, so the Olympic slot went to Gia Lewis-Smallwood.

Before turning to track and field, she practiced volleyball while at Mansfield Legacy High School.

== Competition record ==
Year	Competition	Venue	Position	Event	Notes
Representing the United States
2011	World Youth Championships	Lille, France	3rd	Discus throw	52.58 m (172 ft 6 in)
2011	Pan American Junior Championships	Miramar, United States	1st	Discus throw	53.12 m (174 ft 3 1/4 in)
2012	World Junior Championships	Barcelona, Spain	3rd	Discus throw	60.07 m (197 ft 3/4 in)
2015	World Championships	Beijing, China	14th (q)	Discus throw	60.24 m (197 ft 7 1/2 in)
2016	NACAC U23 Championships	San Salvador, El Salvador	1st	Discus throw	57.20 m (187 ft 7 3/4 in)
2016	Olympic Games	Rio de Janeiro, Brazil	29th (q)	Discus throw	53.33 m (174 ft 11 1/2 in)
