= Jiang Zhichao =

Chinese athlete (born 2005)

Personal information
- Nationality: Chinese
- Born: 6 January 2005 (age 21)

Sport
- Sport: Athletics
- Event: Discus throw

Achievements and titles
- Personal best: Discus: 64.49m (2024)
Medal record
Women's athletics
Representing China
Asian Games
Silver medal – second place	2022 Hangzhou	Discus throw
Silver medal – second place	2026 Nagoya	Discus throw
Asian U20 Championships
Silver medal – second place	2023 Yecheon	Discus

Jiang Zhichao (born 6 January 2005) is a Chinese discus thrower. She was a silver medalist at the 2022 Asian Games, having also previously been a silver medalist at the U20 Asian Championships. She competed for China at the 2024 Olympic Games.

== Biography ==
She was a silver medal winner at the 2023 Asian U20 Athletics Championships in Yecheon, South Korea, with a throw of 55.93 metres in June 2023, to finish runner-up behind compatriot Huang Jingru.

In September 2023, she was a silver medalist at the delayed 2022 Asian Games held in Hangzhou in October 2023, finishing runner-up to compatriot Feng Bin with a throw of 61.04 metres, a new personal best. She had previously also been runner-up to Feng Bin at the Chinese Athletics Championships in June 2023, throwing 60.19 metres.

She improved her personal best to 64.49 metres competing in Germany in May 2024. She was runner up to Feng Bin again at the Chinese Athletics Championships in June 2024, throwing 60.94 metres. She was selected to compete in the discus throw at the 2024 Paris Olympics, where she managed a distance of 59.10 metres and did not qualify for the final.

She threw 60.10 metres to finish eighth at the 2025 Xiamen Diamond League event in China, in April 2025. In September 2025, she competed at the 2025 World Athletics Championships in Tokyo, Japan, without reaching the final.

In September 2026, she won the silver medal behind Feng Bin at the 2026 Asian Games in Japan, with a season-best throw of 62.25 metres.
