= Rosalía Vázquez =

Cuban discus thrower

Personal information
- Born: 11 October 1995 (age 30)

Sport
- Country: Cuba
- Sport: Athletics
- Event: Discus throw

Achievements and titles
- Personal best: Discus throw: 59.45 m (2016)

Rosalía Vázquez (born 11 October 1995) is a Cuban female discus thrower, who won an individual gold medal at the Youth World Championships.
