= Feng Bin =

Chinese discus thrower (born 1994)

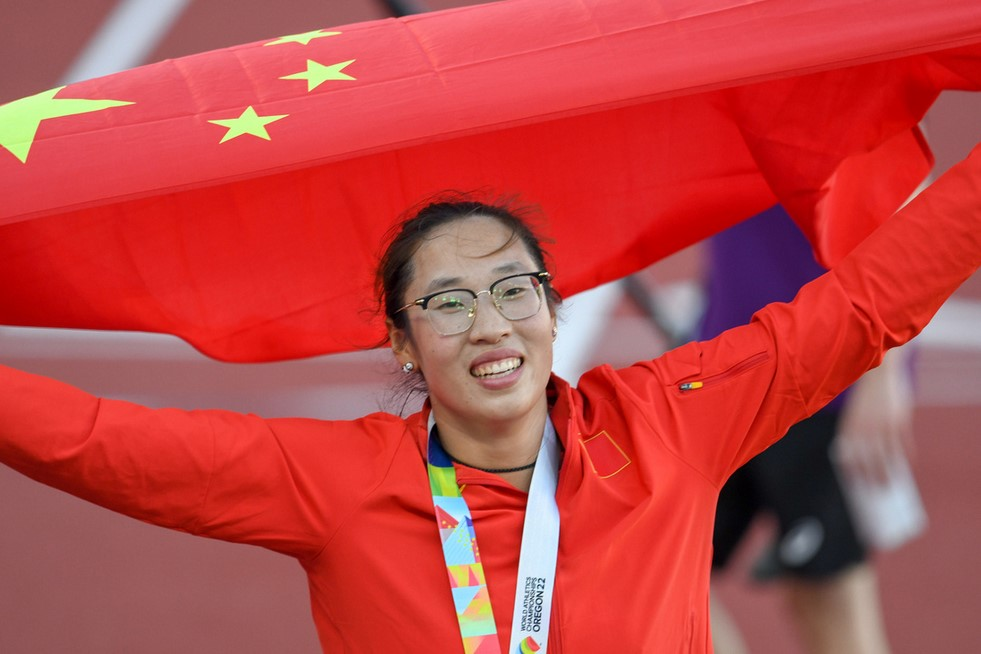
- Feng Bin at the 2022 World Athletics Championships

Personal information
- Nationality: Chinese
- Born: April 3, 1994 (age 32) Penglai District, China
- Height: 1.84 m (6 ft 0 in)
- Weight: 95 kg (209 lb)

Sport
- Sport: Track and field
- Event: Discus throw

Achievements and titles
- Personal best: Discus throw: 69.12 m (2022)
Medal record
Women's athletics
Representing China
Olympic Games
Silver medal – second place	2024 Paris	Discus throw
World Championships
Gold medal – first place	2022 Eugene	Discus throw
Bronze medal – third place	2023 Budapest	Discus throw
Diamond League
First place	2026	Discus throw
Asian Games
Gold medal – first place	2022 Hangzhou	Discus throw
Gold medal – first place	2026 Nagoya	Discus throw
Silver medal – second place	2018 Jakarta-Palembang	Discus throw
Asian Championships
Gold medal – first place	2025 Gumi	Discus throw

Feng Bin (simplified Chinese: 冯彬; traditional Chinese: 馮彬; pinyin: Féng Bīn, born 3 April 1994) is a Chinese track and field athlete who competes in the discus throw. She won the silver medal at the 2024 Summer Olympics. Her personal best is 69.12 m (226 ft 9 1/4 in), set in 2022 World Athletics Championships to win the world title. She was the 2016 winner of the Chinese Athletics Championships.

She began discus throwing in her early teens and competed at the World Youth Championships in Athletics in 2011, placing fourth. Feng broke through at senior level with a gold medal win at the 2015 Military World Games in a personal best of 62.07 m. At the 2016 Summer Olympics she was one of three Chinese throwers to make the discus final, alongside medallist Su Xinyue and Chen Yang.

== International competitions ==
Year	Competition	Venue	Position	Event	Notes
2011	World Youth Championships	Lille, France	4th	Discus throw	51.25 m
2015	Military World Games	Mungyeong, South Korea	1st	Discus throw	62.07 m
2016	Olympic Games	Rio de Janeiro, Brazil	8th	Discus throw	63.06 m
2017	World Championships	London, United Kingdom	8th	Discus throw	61.56 m
2018	Asian Games	Jakarta, Indonesia	2nd	Discus throw	64.25 m
2019	Asian Championships	Doha, Qatar	1st	Discus throw	65.36 m
2019	World Championships	Doha, Qatar	5th	Discus throw	62.48 m
2021	Olympic Games	Tokyo, Japan	17th (q)	Discus throw	60.45 m
2022	World Championships	Eugene, Oregon, United States	1st	Discus throw	69.12 m
2023	Asian Championships	Bangkok, Thailand	1st	Discus throw	66.42 m
2023	World Championships	Budapest, Hungary	3rd	Discus throw	68.20 m
2023	Asian Games	Hangzhou, China	1st	Discus throw	67.93 m
2024	Olympic Games	Paris, France	2nd	Discus throw	67.51 m
2025	Asian Championships	Gumi, South Korea	1st	Discus throw	61.90 m
2025	World Championships	Tokyo, Japan	7th	Discus throw	65.28 m
2026	Asian Games	Nagoya, Japan	1st	Discus throw	63.83 m
