= Seema Punia =

Indian discus thrower (born 1983)

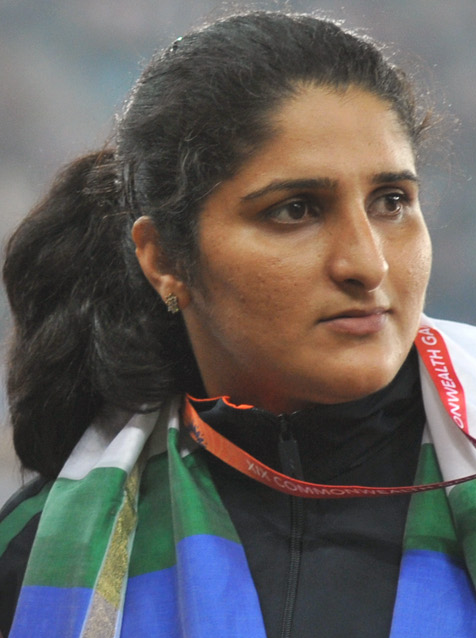
- Punia at the 2010 Commonwealth Games

Personal information
- Born: 27 July 1983 (age 43) Khewra, Haryana, India
- Height: 1.82 m (6 ft 0 in)

Sport
- Sport: Athletics
- Event: Discus throw

Achievements and titles
- Personal bests: 64.84 m (Kyiv, 2004)
Medal record
Women's athletics
Representing India
Asian Games
Gold medal – first place	2014 Incheon	Discus throw
Bronze medal – third place	2018 Jakarta	Discus throw
Bronze medal – third place	2022 Hangzhou	Discus throw
Commonwealth Games
Silver medal – second place	2006 Melbourne	Discus throw
Silver medal – second place	2014 Glasgow	Discus throw
Silver medal – second place	2018 Gold Coast	Discus throw
Bronze medal – third place	2010 Delhi	Discus throw
World Junior Championships
Bronze medal – third place	2002 Kingston	Discus throw

Seema Punia (née Antil) (born 27 July 1983) is an Indian discus thrower.

== Early and personal life ==
Seema was born in Khewra, Sonipat in Haryana. Her sporting career began at the age of 11 years as a hurdler and a long-jumper, but later took to discus throw. She studied in the Government College, Sonipat.

Seema is married to Ankush Punia, her coach, and a former discus thrower who represented India at the 2004 Athens Olympics.

== Career ==
Seema originally won a gold medal at the 2000 World Junior Championships, where she earned the nickname: Millennium Child – but she was stripped off her medal due to a positive dope test for pseudoephedrine. As per the rules in force at that time for such an offence, her National Federation issued her a public warning after stripping her of the medal. She won a bronze medal at the next World Junior Championships in 2002.

She won a silver medal at the 2006 Commonwealth Games, and was honoured with Bhim Award by the Government of Haryana on 26 June 2006. Her absence from the 2006 Asian Games attracted considerable media attention. She had tested positive for a steroid (stanozolol) prior to the Games but was cleared to participate by her National Federation. She, however, opted out of the team for the Games.

She won a bronze medal at the 2010 Commonwealth Games. She finished 12th at the 2012 London Olympics. In 2014, she won a silver medal at the Commonwealth Games and a gold at the Asian Games.

== International competitions ==
Year	Competition	Venue	Position	Event	Notes
Representing India
2002	World Junior Championships	Kingston, Jamaica	3rd	Discus throw	55.83 m
2004	Olympic Games	Athens, Greece	14th	Discus throw	60.64 m
2006	Commonwealth Games	Melbourne, Australia	2nd	Discus throw	60.56 m
2010	Commonwealth Games	Delhi, India	3rd	Discus throw	58.46 m
2012	Olympic Games	London, England	12th	Discus throw	61.91 m
2014	Commonwealth Games	Glasgow, Scotland	2nd	Discus throw	58.44 m
2014	Asian Games	Incheon, South Korea	1st	Discus throw	61.03 m
2016	Olympic Games	Rio de Janeiro, Brazil	20th	Discus throw	57.58 m
2018	Commonwealth Games	Gold Coast, Australia	2nd	Discus throw	60.41 m
2021	Olympic Games	Tokyo, Japan	16th (q)	Discus throw	60.57 m
2023	Asian Games	Hangzhou, China	3rd	Discus throw	58.62 m

== See also ==
- List of sportspeople sanctioned for doping offences
