= Gabriele Reinsch =

East German discus thrower

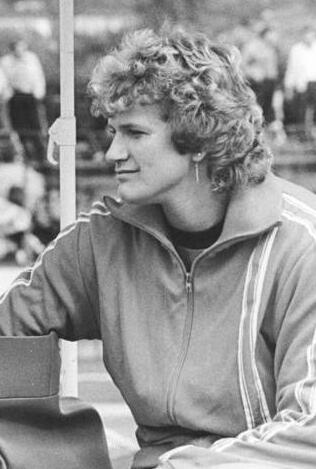
- Reinsch in 1988

Personal information
- Born: 23 September 1963 (age 63) Cottbus, East Germany

Sport
- Sport: Track and field
Medal record
Representing East Germany
Summer Universiade
Silver medal – second place	1987 Zagreb	Discus throw
Silver medal – second place	1989 Duisburg	Discus throw

Gabriele Reinsch (born 23 September 1963) is a German track and field athlete who represented East Germany in the 1988 Olympic Games in discus throw. She is the world record holder, set on 9 July 1988 at the East Germany–Italy tournament in Neubrandenburg. Her throw of 76.80 metres (252.0 ft) was 2.24 metres (7 ft 4 in) further than the previous record.

Reinsch began competing at the age of 14 and tried at first the high jump and shot put, even placing second in the shot put at the 1981 junior European championships. In 1982, she switched to the discus.

== International competitions ==
Year	Competition	Venue	Position	Event	Notes
Representing East Germany
1981	European Junior Championships	Utrecht, Netherlands	2nd	Shot put	17.03 m
1987	Universiade	Zagreb, Yugoslavia	2nd	Discus	64.12 m
1988	Olympic Games	Seoul, South Korea	7th	Discus	67.26 m
1989	Universiade	Duisburg, Germany	2nd	Discus	65.20 m
1990	European Championships	Split, Yugoslavia	4th	Discus	66.08 m

- 1988 Olympic Games: (67.26 - 66.50 - 63.30 - 65.88 - 66.40 - Foul)
- 1990 European Championships: (Foul - 63.46 - 64.30 - Foul - 66.08 - 65.06)

Reinsch belonged to the Cottbus sport club until 1985 and then from 1986 to the ASK Potsdam. She trained with Lothar Hillebrand. During her competitive years she was 1.84 meters tall and weighed 88 kilograms.

Records
Preceded by Zdeňka Šilhavá	Women's Discus World Record Holder; 9 July 1988 –	Succeeded by Incumbent
Sporting positions
Preceded by Diana Gansky	Women's Discus Best Year Performance; 1988	Succeeded by Ilke Wyludda
