= Athletics at the 2023 Pan American Games – Women's discus throw =

Women's discus throw at the 2023 Pan American Games
- Venue: Julio Martínez National Stadium
- Dates: October 30
- Competitors: 12 from 7 nations
- Winning distance: 59.63

Medalists
Gold medal	Izabela da Silva	Brazil
Silver medal	Andressa de Morais	Brazil
Bronze medal	Samantha Hall	Jamaica

The women's discus throw competition of the athletics events at the 2023 Pan American Games was held on October 30 at the Julio Martínez National Stadium of Santiago, Chile.

== Records ==
Prior to this competition, the existing world and Pan American Games records were as follows:

World record	Gabriele Reinsch (GDR)	76.80	Neubrandenburg, East Germany	July 9, 1988
Pan American Games record	Yaimé Pérez (CUB)	66.58	Lima, Peru	August 6, 2019

== Schedule ==
Date	Time	Round
October 30, 2023	19:30	Final

== Results ==
All times shown are in seconds.

KEY:	NR	National record	PB	Personal best	SB	Seasonal best	DQ	Disqualified

=== Final ===
The results were as follows:

Rank	Name	Nationality	#1	#2	#3	#4	#5	#6	Mark	Notes
1st place, gold medalist(s)	Izabela da Silva	Brazil	59.63	X	58.02	59.36	59.47	X	59.63	
2nd place, silver medalist(s)	Andressa de Morais	Brazil	59.29	X	53.51	59.29	X	X	59.29	
3rd place, bronze medalist(s)	Samantha Hall	Jamaica	X	59.14	X	X	X	56.47	59.14	
4	Silinda Morales	Cuba	58.28	X	X	58.73	57.39	X	58.73	
5	Melany Matheus	Cuba	58.58	56.87	X	X	57.01	X	58.58	
6	Elena Bruckner	United States	54.85	57.61	X	56.26	56.21	X	57.61	
7	Ailen Armada	Argentina	53.94	55.73	X	X	53.10	X	55.73	
8	Adrienne Adams	Jamaica	52.15	55.55	X	X	X	53.50	55.55	
9	Karen Gallardo	Chile	54.72	53.28	55.36				55.36	
10	Alma Pollonera	Mexico	47.37	50.09	X				50.09	
11	Catalina Bravo	Chile	X	47.97	47.53				47.97	
	Veronic Fraley	United States	X	X	X				NM	
