= 2013 World Championships in Athletics – Women's discus throw =

Women's discus throw at the 2013 World Championships
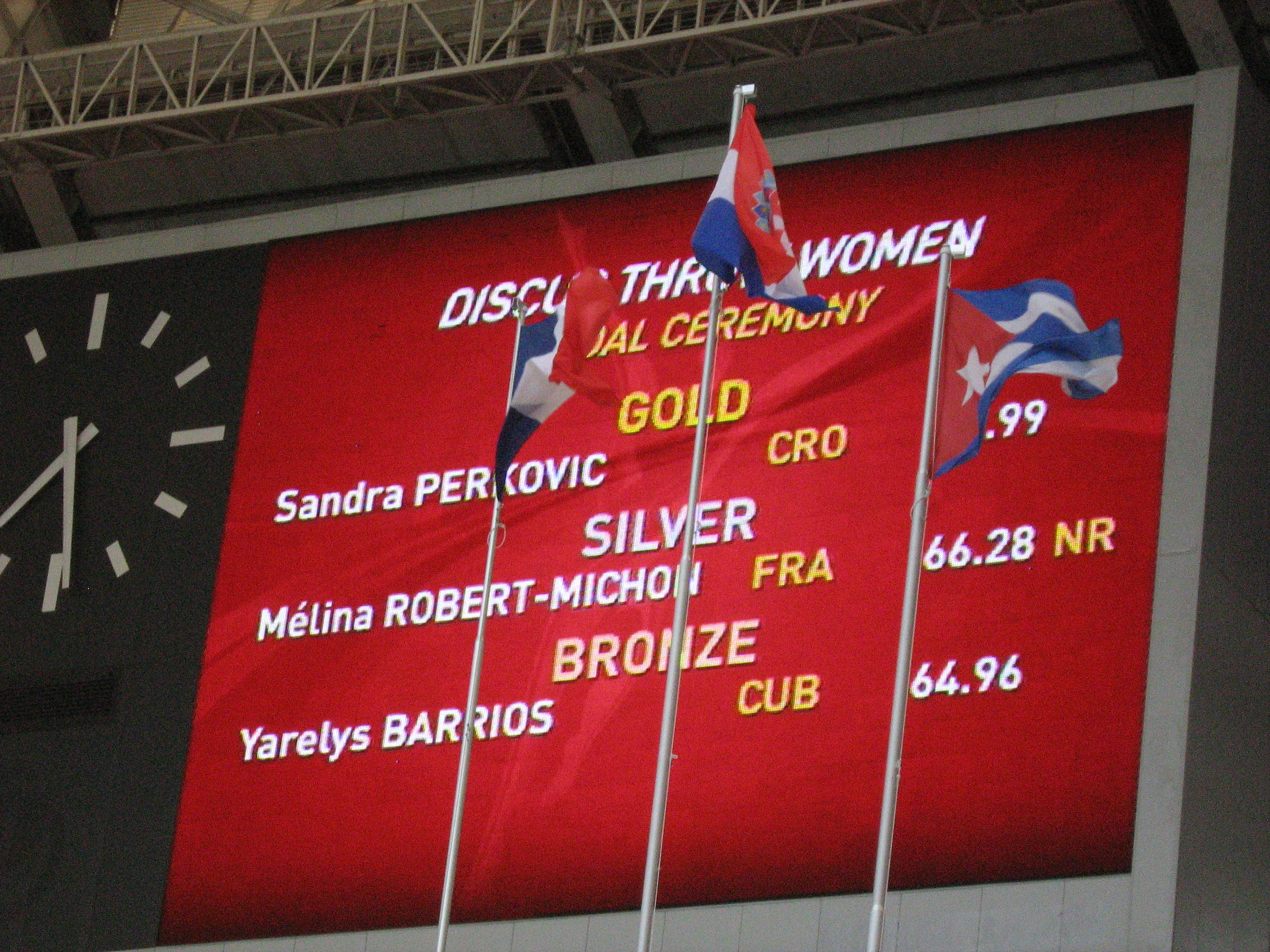
- Venue: Luzhniki Stadium
- Dates: 10 August (qualification); 11 August (final)
- Competitors: 26 from 17 nations
- Winning distance: 67.99 m (223 ft 3/4 in)

Medalists
gold medal	Sandra Perković; Croatia
silver medal	Mélina Robert-Michon; France
bronze medal	Yarelys Barrios; Cuba

Official Video

The women's discus throw at the 2013 World Championships in Athletics was held at the Luzhniki Stadium on 10–11 August.

There were 6 automatic qualifiers for the final. It took 60.14 to get in. In the final Sandra Perković dominated from her first throw. Any of her three fair throws would have won the competition. Yarelys Barrios was a solid second place from her first throw, but she never improved. Meanwhile, Mélina Robert-Michon did improve, her third round throw putting her into second and her final throw more than a meter further to improve her own French national record set more than 11 years (and one daughter) earlier. The record throw was all the more remarkable due to the rainy conditions that hampered the rest of the field, hers was the only improvement after the rains started toward the end of the fourth round.

== Records ==
Prior to the competition, the records were as follows:

World record	Gabriele Reinsch (GDR)	76.80	Neubrandenburg, East Germany	7 July 1988
Championship record	Martina Hellmann (GDR)	71.62	Rome, Italy	31 August 1987
World leading	Sandra Perković (CRO)	67.98	Lausane, Switzerland	4 July 2013
African record	Elizna Naudé (RSA)	64.87	Stellenbosch, South Africa	2 March 2003
Asian record	Xiao Yanling (CHN)	71.68	Beijing, People's Republic of China	14 March 1992
North, Central American and Caribbean record	Hilda Ramos (CUB)	70.88	Havana, Cuba	8 May 1992
South American record	Andressa de Morais (BRA)	64.21	Barquisimeto, Venezuela	10 June 2012
European record	Gabriele Reinsch (GDR)	76.80	Neubrandenburg, East Germany	7 July 1988
Oceanian record	Daniela Costian (AUS)	68.72	Auckland, New Zealand	22 January 1994

== Qualification standards ==
A result	B result
62.00	59.50

== Schedule ==
Date	Time	Round
10 August 2013	9:30	Qualification
11 August 2013	20:15	Final

All times are local times (UTC+4)

== Results ==
KEY:	Q	Qualified	q	12 best performers	NR	National record	PB	Personal best	SB	Seasonal best

=== Qualification ===
Qualification: 63.00 m (Q) and at least 12 best (q) advanced to the final.

Rank	Group	Name	Nationality	No. 1	No. 2	No. 3	Mark	Notes
1	A	Zinaida Sendriutė	Lithuania	64.16			64.16	Q
2	A	Yarelys Barrios	Cuba	63.63			63.63	Q
3	B	Sandra Perković	Croatia	63.62			63.62	Q
4	B	Tan Jian	China	62.57	63.21		63.21	Q
5	A	Mélina Robert-Michon	France	63.16			63.16	Q
5	B	Nadine Müller	Germany	63.16			63.16	Q
7	B	Dani Samuels	Australia	62.73	62.51	62.85	62.85	q
8	B	Żaneta Glanc	Poland	61.30	61.62	59.21	61.62	q
9	B	Rocío Comba	Argentina	61.54	59.51	x	61.54	q
10	B	Gia Lewis-Smallwood	United States	x	61.30	57.56	61.30	q
11	B	Yaime Pérez	Cuba	59.38	57.26	60.33	60.33	q
12	A	Denia Caballero	Cuba	60.14	58.48	x	60.14	q
13	A	Julia Fischer	Germany	56.77	60.09	x	60.09	
14	A	Dragana Tomašević	Serbia	57.58	58.70	58.79	58.79	
15	A	Vera Ganeeva	Russia	58.37	55.23	x	58.37	
16	B	Ekaterina Strokova	Russia	57.85	x	53.24	57.85	
17	B	Irina Rodrigues	Portugal	57.64	55.47	54.09	57.64	
18	A	Karen Gallardo	Chile	x	53.10	57.03	57.03	
19	B	Su Xinyue	China	54.14	54.76	56.87	56.87	
20	A	Svetlana Saykina	Russia	56.62	x	54.05	56.62	
21	A	Liz Podominick	United States	56.41	x	x	56.41	
22	B	Nicoleta Grasu	Romania	x	55.47	56.31	56.31	
23	B	Natalya Fokina-Semenova	Ukraine	x	55.79	x	55.79	
24	A	Whitney Ashley	United States	44.60	x	x	44.60	
	A	Gu Siyu	China	x	x	x	NM	
	A	Fernanda Raquel Borges Martins	Brazil	x	x	x	NM	

=== Final ===
The final was held on 11 August.

Rank	Name	Nationality	No. 1	No. 2	No. 3	No. 4	No. 5	No. 6	Mark	Notes
1st place, gold medalist(s)	Sandra Perković	Croatia	67.52	67.99	x	67.80	x	x	67.99	
2nd place, silver medalist(s)	Mélina Robert-Michon	France	62.53	61.77	65.13	65.08	x	66.28	66.28	NR
3rd place, bronze medalist(s)	Yarelys Barrios	Cuba	64.96	63.99	x	62.77	61.28	63.33	64.96	
4	Nadine Müller	Germany	64.12	64.67	x	x	61.92	63.22	64.67	
5	Gia Lewis-Smallwood	United States	57.21	61.66	62.71	64.23	x	61.10	64.23	
6	Tan Jian	China	x	63.16	61.69	63.34	x	61.47	63.34	
7	Żaneta Glanc	Poland	59.80	62.90	x	61.27	x	x	62.90	SB
8	Denia Caballero	Cuba	62.80	59.80	60.16	61.43	x	62.49	62.80	
9	Zinaida Sendriutė	Lithuania	61.87	62.54	61.44				62.54	
10	Dani Samuels	Australia	59.17	62.42	x				62.42	
11	Yaime Pérez	Cuba	x	62.39	60.16				62.39	
12	Rocío Comba	Argentina	59.83	x	58.32				59.83	
