= 2011 European Athletics U23 Championships – Women's discus throw =

The women's discus throw at the 2011 European Athletics U23 Championships was held at the Městský stadion in Ostrava on 14 and 15 July.

== Medalists ==
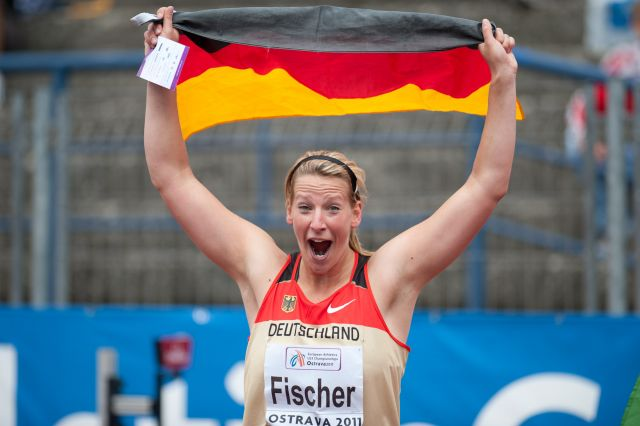
Julia Fischer, having won gold

| Gold | Julia Fischer; Germany (GER) |
| Silver | Nastassia Kashtanava; Belarus (BLR) |
| Bronze | Anita Márton; Hungary (HUN) |

== Schedule ==
| Date | Time | Round |
|---|---|---|
| 14 July 2011 | 10:00 | Qualification |
| 15 July 2011 | 15:25 | Final |

== Results ==
=== Qualification ===
Qualification: Qualification Performance 53.50 (Q) or at least 12 best performers advance to the final.

| Rank | Group | Athlete | Nationality | #1 | #2 | #3 | Result | Notes |
|---|---|---|---|---|---|---|---|---|
| 1 | B | Julia Fischer | Germany | 54.95 | – | – | 54.95 | Q |
| 2 | A | Yekaterina Strokova | Russia | 54.25 | – | – | 54.25 | Q |
| 3 | B | Nastassia Kashtanava | Belarus | 51.86 | 54.06 | – | 54.06 | Q |
| 4 | A | Anita Márton | Hungary | 52.04 | 51.27 | 53.69 | 53.69 | Q |
| 5 | A | Hristína Anagnostopoúlou | Greece | 52.63 | 52.38 | x | 52.63 | q |
| 6 | A | Jitka Kubelová | Czech Republic | 49.24 | 51.64 | 51.13 | 51.64 | q |
| 7 | A | Anna-Katharina Weller | Germany | 50.95 | 49.75 | 50.66 | 50.95 | q |
| 8 | B | Coralie Glatre | France | 50.87 | 48.25 | 49.03 | 50.87 | q |
| 9 | A | Tamara Apostolico | Italy | 50.85 | x | 49.69 | 50.85 | q |
| 10 | B | Katri Hirvonen | Finland | 49.00 | 49.47 | 50.35 | 50.35 | q |
| 11 | B | Irina Rodrigues | Portugal | 50.20 | x | 47.57 | 50.20 | q |
| 12 | A | Elina Mattila | Finland | 43.54 | 49.74 | 47.55 | 49.74 | q |
| 13 | B | Kateřina Klausová | Czech Republic | 48.93 | 48.34 | 45.84 | 48.93 | |
| 14 | A | Lucie Catouillart | France | 46.29 | 48.46 | 47.46 | 48.46 | |
| 15 | B | Androniki Lada | Cyprus | 47.46 | 45.21 | 47.91 | 47.91 | |
| 16 | B | Semra Türk | Turkey | 40.20 | x | 47.86 | 47.86 | |
| 17 | B | Elisabeth Graf | Switzerland | 47.71 | x | x | 47.71 | |
| 18 | B | Maria Hernandez | Spain | 47.35 | x | x | 47.35 | |
| 19 | A | Salome Rigishvili | (Georgia (country)) Georgia | x | 47.08 | 46.30 | 47.08 | |
| 20 | A | Sandra Andersson | Sweden | 44.40 | 41.13 | 44.92 | 44.92 | |

=== Final ===
| Rank | Athlete | Nationality | #1 | #2 | #3 | #4 | #5 | #6 | Result | Notes |
|---|---|---|---|---|---|---|---|---|---|---|
| 1st place, gold medalist(s) | Julia Fischer | Germany | 56.31 | 56.45 | 57.97 | 57.90 | 56.98 | 59.60 | 59.60 | PB |
| 2nd place, silver medalist(s) | Nastassia Kashtanava | Belarus | 55.05 | 56.25 | 54.39 | x | 52.83 | 51.34 | 56.25 | |
| 3rd place, bronze medalist(s) | Anita Márton | Hungary | 52.35 | 53.58 | 52.69 | x | 54.14 | x | 54.14 | |
| 4 | Hristína Anagnostopoúlou | Greece | 52.44 | 52.37 | 51.16 | 52.66 | 53.43 | 52.63 | 53.43 | |
| 5 | Irina Rodrigues | Portugal | 52.71 | 50.52 | x | x | 50.50 | x | 52.71 | |
| 6 | Tamara Apostolico | Italy | 48.00 | 51.01 | 50.27 | 51.63 | 50.77 | x | 51.63 | |
| 7 | Coralie Glatre | France | 50.88 | 45.18 | x | 48.28 | x | 49.26 | 50.88 | |
| 8 | Anna-Katharina Weller | Germany | 50.32 | x | x | x | x | 48.79 | 50.32 | |
| 9 | Katri Hirvonen | Finland | 48.87 | 48.45 | x | – | – | – | 48.87 | |
| 10 | Yekaterina Strokova | Russia | x | 48.16 | x | – | – | – | 48.16 | |
| 11 | Elina Mattila | Finland | 46.00 | x | 47.84 | – | – | – | 47.84 | |
| 12 | Jitka Kubelová | Czech Republic | x | x | 47.10 | – | – | – | 47.10 | |

== Participation ==
According to an unofficial count, 20 athletes from 16 countries participated in the event.

- Belarus (1)
- Cyprus (1)
- Czech Republic (2)
- Finland (2)
- France (2)
- Georgia (1)
- Germany (2)
- Greece (1)
- Hungary (1)
- Italy (1)
- Portugal (1)
- Russia (1)
- Spain (1)
- Sweden (1)
- Switzerland (1)
- Turkey (1)
