= Athletics at the 2016 Summer Olympics – Women's discus throw =

Women's discus throw at the Games of the XXXI Olympiad
- Venue: Olympic Stadium
- Date: 15–16 August 2016
- Competitors: 34 from 23 nations
- Winning distance: 69.21 m

Medalists
1st place, gold medalist(s)		Sandra Perković	Croatia
2nd place, silver medalist(s)		Mélina Robert-Michon	France
3rd place, bronze medalist(s)		Denia Caballero	Cuba

Official Video Highlights

The women's discus throw competition at the 2016 Summer Olympics in Rio de Janeiro, Brazil was held at the Olympic Stadium on 16–17 August. Each athlete received three throws in the qualifying round. All who achieved the qualifying distance progressed to the final. Each finalist was allowed three throws in last round, with the top eight athletes after that point being given three further attempts.

== Summary ==
Mélina Robert-Michon took the lead with a 65.52 m on the first throw of the final competition. On the second throw, Nadine Müller threw 63.13 m. On the third throw, Su Xinyue threw 63.88 m to move into silver position. Those three throws held up until Dani Samuels displaced Müller near the end of the round. Müller couldn't land another legal throw. Nobody could improve their position through the second round. In the third round, world champion Denia Caballero moved into silver position with her best 65.34 m. Two throws later, Sandra Perković lander her only legal throw of the competition 69.21 m (227 ft 0 in) to leapfrog from the brink of elimination to gold. The medal positions were set, but on her fifth round throw Robert-Michon, improved her mark to 66.73 m, a new French record.

The following evening the medals were presented by Claudia Bokel, IOC member, Germany and Geoffrey Gardner, Council Member of the IAAF.

== Schedule ==
All times are Brasília Time (UTC−3).

Date	Time	Round
Monday, 15 August 2016	20:30	Qualifications
Tuesday, 16 August 2016	11:20	Finals

== Records ==
Prior to the competition, the existing World and Olympic records were as follows.

World record	Gabriele Reinsch (GDR)	76.80 m	Neubrandenburg, East Germany	9 July 1988
Olympic record	Martina Hellmann (GDR)	72.30 m	Seoul, South Korea	29 September 1988
2016 World leading	Sandra Perković (CRO)	70.88 m	Shanghai, China	14 May 2016

The following national record was established during the competition:

Country	Athlete	Round	Distance	Notes
France	Mélina Robert-Michon (FRA)	Final	66.73 m	

== Results ==
=== Qualifying round ===
Qual. rule: qualification standard 62.00 m (Q) or at least best 12 qualified (q).

Rank	Group	Name	Nationality	#1	#2	#3	Result	Notes
1	B	Yaime Pérez	Cuba	65.38			65.38	Q
2	B	Su Xinyue	China	65.14			65.14	Q
3	A	Sandra Perković	Croatia	x	x	64.81	64.81	Q
4	A	Dani Samuels	Australia	x	59.42	64.46	64.46	Q
5	B	Nadine Müller	Germany	63.67			63.67	Q
6	A	Denia Caballero	Cuba	x	x	62.94	62.94	Q
7	B	Mélina Robert-Michon	France	62.59			62.59	Q
8	A	Feng Bin	China	55.97	62.01		62.01	Q
9	B	Julia Fisher	Germany	61.83	x	60.69	61.83	q
10	A	Chen Yang	China	x	x	61.44	61.44	q
11	A	Zinaida Sendriute	Lithuania	x	x	60.79	60.79	q, SB
12	A	Shanice Craft	Germany	60.23	x	x	60.23	q
13	A	Pauline Pousse	France	x	x	58.98	58.98	
14	A	Chinwe Okoro	Nigeria	57.34	58.85	58.53	58.85	
15	B	Natalia Semenova	Ukraine	x	58.41	x	58.41	
16	B	Tarasue Barnett	Jamaica	x	54.36	58.09	58.09	
17	A	Żaneta Glanc	Poland	55.27	56.09	57.88	57.88	
18	B	Karen Gallardo	Chile	57.81	55.98	55.20	57.81	
19	A	Dragana Tomašević	Serbia	55.87	57.67	x	57.67	
20	B	Seema Antil	India	57.58	x	56.78	57.58	
21	B	Andressa de Morais	Brazil	57.38	x	x	57.38	
22	A	Shadae Lawrence	Jamaica	57.09	x	x	57.09	
23	B	Sabina Asenjo	Spain	56.94	56.22	x	56.94	
24	B	Subenrat Insaeng	Thailand	56.64	x	54.74	56.64	
25	B	Kelsey Card	United States	x	51.16	56.41	56.41	
26	A	Hrisoula Anagnostopoulou	Greece	x	54.84	53.19	54.84	
27	B	Rocío Comba	Argentina	x	54.44	x	54.44	
28	B	Jade Lally	Great Britain	51.60	53.99	54.06	54.06	
29	B	Shelbi Vaughan	United States	x	53.33	46.71	53.33	
30	A	Natalia Stratulat	Moldova	x	53.27	48.80	53.27	
31	A	Fernanda Martins	Brazil	50.19	51.85	x	51.85	
32	A	Mariya Telushkina	Kazakhstan	x	43.70	45.33	45.33	
	A	Whitney Ashley	United States	x	x	x	NM	
	B	Kellion Knibb	Jamaica	x	x	x	NM	

=== Final ===
Rank	Name	Nationality	#1	#2	#3	#4	#5	#6	Result	Notes
1st place, gold medalist(s)	Sandra Perković	Croatia	x	x	69.21	x	x	x	69.21	
2nd place, silver medalist(s)	Mélina Robert-Michon	France	65.52	64.83	65.08	x	66.73	x	66.73	NR
3rd place, bronze medalist(s)	Denia Caballero	Cuba	61.80	x	65.34	63.82	x	64.64	65.34	
4	Dani Samuels	Australia	63.57	x	61.21	61.95	62.87	64.90	64.90	
5	Su Xinyue	China	63.88	61.02	64.37	62.20	63.87	x	64.37	
6	Nadine Müller	Germany	63.13	x	x	x	x	x	63.13	
7	Chen Yang	China	63.11	x	60.47	59.19	x	x	63.11	
8	Feng Bin	China	62.26	60.27	63.06	61.14	x	61.85	63.06	
9	Julia Fischer	Germany	60.69	x	62.67	did not advance			62.67	
10	Zinaida Sendriute	Lithuania	58.25	59.95	61.89	did not advance			61.89	SB
11	Shanice Craft	Germany	x	58.39	59.85	did not advance			59.85	
–	Yaime Pérez	Cuba	x	x	x	did not advance			NM	
