= Athletics at the 2010 South American Games – Women's discus throw =

The Women's Discus Throw event at the 2010 South American Games was held on March 22 at 17:00.

== Medalists ==
Gold	Silver	Bronze
Fernanda Raquel Borges; Brazil	Andressa de Morais; Brazil	Luz Leyni Montaño; Colombia

== Records ==
Standing records prior to the 2010 South American Games
World record	Gabriele Reinsch	East Germany	76.80m	Neubrandenburg, Germany	9 July 1988
World Leading	Sandra Perković	Croatia	66.85m	Split, Croatia	6 March 2010
South American record	Elisângela Adriano	Brazil	61.96	São Leopoldo, Brazil	21 May 1998
South American U23 record	Rocío Comba	Argentina	59.86m	Uberlândia, Brazil	11 May 2008

== Results ==
Results were published.

=== Final ===
Rank	Athlete	Nationality	Attempt						Best Result	Notes
Rank	Athlete	Nationality	1	2	3	4	5	6	Best Result	Notes
1st place, gold medalist(s)	Fernanda Raquel Borges	Brazil	51.77	55.68	52.31	51.41	54.09	x	55.68	
2nd place, silver medalist(s)	Andressa de Morais	Brazil	51.59	52.36	x	52.50	51.91	53.28	53.28	
3rd place, bronze medalist(s)	Luz Leyni Montaño	Colombia	49.09	x	47.00	x	x	x	49.09	
4	Madelaine Santa Cruz	Ecuador	x	43.58	44.94	45.39	44.53	43.06	45.39	
5	Ángela Rivas	Colombia	x	x	x	44.43	x	x	44.43	
6	Fátima Ramos	(Peru) Perú	x	39.48	39.18	39.45	40.78	39.83	40.78	
7	Dukina Freytters	Venezuela	35.89	x	x	x	34.82	36.00	36.00	

== See also ==
- 2010 South American Under-23 Championships in Athletics
