= Athletics at the 2019 Pan American Games – Women's discus throw =

Women's discus throw at the 2019 Pan American Games
- Venue: Athletics Stadium
- Dates: August 6
- Competitors: 13 from 8 nations
- Winning distance: 66.58 m

Medalists
| Gold medal | Yaime Pérez | Cuba |
| Silver medal | Fernanda Martins | Brazil |
| Bronze medal | Denia Caballero | Cuba |

The women's discus throw competition of the athletics events at the 2019 Pan American Games took place on the 6th of August at the 2019 Pan American Games Athletics Stadium. The defending Pan American Games champion is Denia Caballero from Cuba.

== Records ==
Prior to this competition, the existing world and Pan American Games records were as follows:

| World record | Gabriele Reinsch (GDR) | 76.80 m | Neubrandenburg, East Germany | July 9, 1988 |
| Pan American Games record | Yarelys Barrios (CUB) | 66.40 m | Guadalajara, Mexico | October 28, 2011 |

== Schedule ==
| Date | Time | Round |
|---|---|---|
| August 6, 2019 | 18:25 | Final |

== Results ==
All results shown are in meters.

| KEY: | q | Fastest non-qualifiers | Q | Qualified | NR | National record | PB | Personal best | SB | Seasonal best | DQ | Disqualified |

=== Final ===
The results were as follows:

| Rank | Name | Nationality | #1 | #2 | #3 | #4 | #5 | #6 | Mark | Notes |
|---|---|---|---|---|---|---|---|---|---|---|
| 1st place, gold medalist(s) | Yaime Pérez | Cuba | 63.88 | x | 61.69 | 64.65 | 64.15 | 66.58 | 66.58 | GR |
| 2nd place, silver medalist(s) | Fernanda Martins | Brazil | x | 62.23 | x | 60.29 | x | 59.44 | 62.23 | |
| 3rd place, bronze medalist(s) | Denia Caballero | Cuba | 60.46 | x | 59.14 | x | x | x | 60.46 | |
| 4 | Whitney Ashley | United States | 60.27 | x | x | x | x | x | 60.27 | |
| 5 | Shanice Love | Jamaica | x | 57.82 | 57.56 | 59.82 | 56.43 | 57.85 | 59.82 | |
| 6 | Shadae Lawrence | Jamaica | 51.67 | 58.99 | 57.54 | x | x | 55.03 | 58.99 | |
| 7 | Kelsey Card | United States | x | 57.87 | 53.88 | 58.94 | x | 57.67 | 58.94 | |
| 8 | Aixa Middleton | Panama | 49.27 | 53.14 | 53.80 | | | | 53.80 | SB |
| 9 | Karen Gallardo | Chile | 51.41 | 53.42 | 51.84 | | | | 53.42 | |
| 10 | Ailen Armada | Argentina | x | x | 51.30 | | | | 51.30 | |
| 11 | Ivana Gallardo | Chile | x | 50.85 | x | | | | 50.85 | |
| | Portious Warren | Trinidad and Tobago | x | x | x | | | | NM | |
| | Andressa de Morais | Brazil | ~~x~~ | ~~65.98~~ | ~~x~~ | ~~60.26~~ | ~~x~~ | ~~x~~ | ~~65.98~~ | ~~AR~~, DSQ |
