= 2008 World Junior Championships in Athletics – Women's discus throw =

The women's discus throw event at the 2008 World Junior Championships in Athletics was held in Bydgoszcz, Poland, at Zawisza Stadium on 11 and 13 July.

== Medalists ==
Gold	Xi Shangxue; China
Silver	Julia Fischer; Germany
Bronze	Sandra Perković; Croatia

== Results ==
=== Final ===
13 July

Rank	Name	Nationality	Attempts						Result	Notes
Rank	Name	Nationality	1	2	3	4	5	6	Result	Notes
1st place, gold medalist(s)	Xi Shangxue	China	48.23	51.58	54.96	54.50	x	53.15	54.96	
2nd place, silver medalist(s)	Julia Fischer	Germany	51.29	54.69	50.78	53.42	x	x	54.69	
3rd place, bronze medalist(s)	Sandra Perković	Croatia	50.98	53.60	52.91	53.62	54.24	51.22	54.24	
4	Anna-Katharina Weller	Germany	52.07	52.34	x	x	x	x	52.34	
5	Viktoriya Bolbat	Ukraine	x	49.21	51.26	50.96	48.91	49.43	51.26	
6	Anita Márton	Hungary	39.15	45.30	51.16	45.97	50.12	48.48	51.16	
7	Anna Jelmini	United States	49.10	49.46	39.11	42.80	44.98	45.82	49.46	
8	Nastassia Kashtanava	Belarus	45.53	49.31	x	x	44.80	47.99	49.31	
9	Jin Yuanyuan	China	x	48.92	48.35				48.92	
10	Mariya Koshkaryova	Ukraine	48.50	x	43.62				48.50	
11	Erin Pendleton	United States	48.45	47.16	46.23				48.45	
12	Li Wen-Hua	Chinese Taipei	47.08	x	42.70				47.08	

=== Qualifications ===
11 July

==== Group A ====
Rank	Name	Nationality	Attempts			Result	Notes
Rank	Name	Nationality	1	2	3	Result	Notes
1	Anna-Katharina Weller	Germany	x	51.97	x	51.97	q
2	Jin Yuanyuan	China	44.40	50.50	x	50.50	q
3	Anita Márton	Hungary	50.20	x	48.08	50.20	q
4	Anna Jelmini	United States	46.86	50.13	x	50.13	q
5	Mariya Koshkaryova	Ukraine	x	46.47	49.95	49.95	q
6	Kimberley Mulhall	Australia	46.48	45.18	48.32	48.32	
7	Irina Rodrigues	Portugal	46.62	48.15	45.35	48.15	
8	Yekaterina Strokova	Russia	48.13	x	46.23	48.13	
9	Anaïs Marcadet	France	46.95	48.12	x	48.12	
10	Andressa de Morais	Brazil	47.44	x	44.30	47.44	
11	Elina Mattila	Finland	44.18	44.07	45.45	45.45	
12	Katerina Klausová	Czech Republic	44.72	42.04	x	44.72	
13	Sakong Ga-Eun	South Korea	44.42	x	x	44.42	
14	Izabela Ogórek	Poland	44.32	43.25	42.64	44.32	
15	Simona Rupeikaite	Lithuania	x	41.30	x	41.30	
16	Hanna Erlandsson	Sweden	39.95	x	40.77	40.77	
	Stefania Strumillo	Italy	x	x	x	NM	

==== Group B ====
Rank	Name	Nationality	Attempts			Result	Notes
Rank	Name	Nationality	1	2	3	Result	Notes
1	Xi Shangxue	China	x	49.09	54.02	54.02	Q
2	Li Wen-Hua	Chinese Taipei	49.51	52.71	46.42	52.71	q
3	Sandra Perković	Croatia	51.95	x	51.42	51.95	q
4	Julia Fischer	Germany	51.56	x	x	51.56	q
5	Nastassia Kashtanava	Belarus	51.33	44.43	40.72	51.33	q
6	Viktoriya Bolbat	Ukraine	x	51.30	49.41	51.30	q
7	Erin Pendleton	United States	x	46.68	50.01	50.01	q
8	Coralie Glatre	France	46.58	48.13	48.13	48.13	
9	Te Rina Keenan	New Zealand	46.22	47.62	x	47.62	
10	Katri Hirvonen	Finland	43.76	47.46	x	47.46	
11	Salome Rigishvili	Georgia	47.06	46.68	45.84	47.06	
12	Jenny Ozorai	Hungary	38.63	40.49	47.02	47.02	
13	Shaunagh Brown	United Kingdom	35.51	42.93	45.62	45.62	
14	Tamara Apostolico	Italy	45.09	44.90	x	45.09	
15	Lomana Fagatuai	Australia	43.90	x	41.28	43.90	
16	Matilda Gunnarsson	Sweden	41.48	43.53	x	43.53	
	Melissa Boekelman	Netherlands	x	x	x	NM	

== Participation ==
According to an unofficial count, 34 athletes from 24 countries participated in the event.

- Australia (2)
- Belarus (1)
- Brazil (1)
- China (2)
- Chinese Taipei (1)
- Croatia (1)
- Czech Republic (1)
- Finland (2)
- France (2)
- Georgia (1)
- Germany (2)
- Hungary (2)
- Italy (2)
- Lithuania (1)
- Netherlands (1)
- New Zealand (1)
- Poland (1)
- Portugal (1)
- Russia (1)
- South Korea (1)
- Sweden (2)
- Ukraine (2)
- United Kingdom (1)
- United States (2)
