= Track and field at the 2015 Military World Games – Women's discus throw =

The women's discus throw event at the 2015 Military World Games was held on 7 October at the KAFAC Sports Complex.

== Records ==
Prior to this competition, the existing world and CISM record were as follows:

World Record	Gabriele Reinsch (GDR)	76.80	Neubrandenburg, East Germany	9 July 1988
CISM World Record				

== Schedule ==
Date	Time	Round
7 October 2015	16:30	Final

== Medalists ==
Gold	Silver	Bronze
Feng Bin; China	Andressa de Morais; Brazil	Yuliya Maltseva; Russia

== Results ==
=== Final ===
Rank	Athlete	Nationality	#1	#2	#3	#4	#5	#6	Result	Notes
1st place, gold medalist(s)	Feng Bin	China	59.01	60.25	60.30	60.68	62.07	60.59	62.07	
2nd place, silver medalist(s)	Andressa de Morais	Brazil	56.23	59.07	57.41	x	x	x	59.07	
3rd place, bronze medalist(s)	Yuliya Maltseva	Russia	55.69	57.52	x	x	57.16	53.45	57.52	
4	Siyu Gu	China	56.42	56.06	x	54.09	53.09	x	56.42	
5	Chrysoula Anagnostopoulou	Greece	52.15	54.56	55.09	54.05	54.07	53.86	55.09	
6	Noora Salem Jasim	Bahrain	40.68	x	45.17	45.45	47.62	49.87	49.87	
7	Paige Blackburn	United States	49.39	x	x	x	x	x	49.39	
8	Auriol Dongmo Mekemnang	Cameroon	x	x	44.50	45.20	45.00	46.44	46.44	
9	Caroline Cherotich	Kenya	42.79	41.15	x				42.79	
