= Tara-Sue Barnett =

Jamaican discus thrower

Personal information
- Born: 9 October 1993 (age 32) Clarendon, Jamaica
- Education: Grand Canyon University
- Height: 1.78 m (5 ft 10 in)
- Weight: 81 kg (179 lb)

Sport
- Sport: Athletics
- Event: Discus throw

Tara-Sue Barnett (born 9 October 1993) is a Jamaican athlete specialising in the discus throw. She represented her country at the 2016 Summer Olympics without qualifying for the final.

Her personal best in the event is 61.28 metres set in Irvine in 2016.

== International competitions ==
Year	Competition	Venue	Position	Notes
Representing Jamaica
2012	CARIFTA Games (U20)	Hamilton, Bermuda	1st	49.62 m
2012	Central American and Caribbean Junior Championships in Athletics (U20)	San Salvador, El Salvador	1st	49.62 m
2012	World Junior Championships	Barcelona, Spain	33rd (q)	42.06 m
2014	Pan American Sports Festival	Mexico City, Mexico	7th	54.91 m
2014	Central American and Caribbean Games	Xalapa, Mexico	6th	50.65 m
2016	Olympic Games	Rio de Janeiro, Brazil	16th (q)	58.09 m
2017	World Championships	London, United Kingdom	–	NM
