= Irina Rodrigues =

Portuguese discus thrower (born 1991)

Personal information
- Full name: Irina Cristiana Carreira Rodrigues
- Born: 5 February 1991 (age 35) Leiria, Portugal
- Education: Medicine, University of Coimbra
- Occupations: Athlete, Medical doctor
- Height: 1.83 m (6 ft 0 in)
- Weight: 95 kg (209 lb)

Sport
- Country: Portugal
- Sport: Athletics
- Event: Discus
Medal record
Representing Portugal
Mediterranean Games
Gold medal – first place	2026 Taranto	Discus throw
- Updated on 14 August 2012

Irina Cristiana Carreira Rodrigues (born 5 February 1991) is a Portuguese athlete specializing in the discus throw. She competed for Portugal at the 2012 Summer Olympics without reaching the final.

== Competition record ==
Year	Competition	Venue	Position	Notes
Representing Portugal
2007	European Junior Championships	Hengelo, Netherlands	10th	44.33 m
2008	World Junior Championships	Bydgoszcz, Poland	14th (q)	48.15 m
2009	European Junior Championships	Novi Sad, Serbia	3rd	53.14 m
2010	Ibero-American Championships	San Fernando, Spain	6th	53.58 m
2010	World Junior Championships	Moncton, Canada	5th	52.75 m
2011	European U23 Championships	Ostrava, Czech Republic	5th	52.71 m
2011	Universiade	Shenzhen, China	9th	53.12 m
2012	European Championships	Helsinki, Finland	20th (q)	53.01 m
2012	Olympic Games	London, United Kingdom	32nd (q)	57.23 m
2013	European U23 Championships	Tampere, Finland	3rd	56.80 m
2013	World Championships	Moscow, Russia	17th (q)	57.64 m
2014	European Championships	Zurich, Switzerland	14th (q)	52.53 m
2015	World Championships	Beijing, China	31st (q)	52.82 m
2016	European Championships	Amsterdam, Netherlands	26th (q)	50.40 m
2017	World Championships	London, United Kingdom	21st (q)	56.98 m
2018	Mediterranean Games	Tarragona, Spain	4th	57.71 m
2018	European Championships	Berlin, Germany	9th	58.00 m
2018	Ibero-American Championships	Trujillo, Peru	3rd	58.86 m
2019	World Championships	Doha, Qatar	23rd (q)	56.21 m
2021	Olympic Games	Tokyo, Japan	25th (q)	57.03 m
2022	Ibero-American Championships	La Nucía, Spain	6th	56.73 m
2022	World Championships	Eugene, United States	23rd (q)	57.69 m
2022	European Championships	Munich, Germany	11th	56.23 m
2023	World Championships	Budapest, Hungary	26th (q)	57.08 m
2024	European Championships	Rome, Italy	4th	62.76 m
2024	Olympic Games	Paris, France	9th	61.19 m
2025	World Championships	Tokyo, Japan	21st (q)	59.23 m
2026	European Championships	Birmingham, United Kingdom	16th (q)	57.46 m
2026	Mediterranean Games	Taranto, Italy	1st	62.51 m
