= Su Xinyue =

Chinese discus thrower (born 1991)

Su Xinyue (born 8 November 1991) is a Chinese athlete specializing in the discus throw. She won the gold at the 2013 Asian Championships. She also competed at the 2013 World Championships failing to reach the final.

Her personal best throw is 65.59 metres (Neubrandenburg (GER) 2016).

== International competitions ==
Year	Competition	Venue	Position	Notes
Representing China
2010	World Junior Championships	Moncton, Canada	13th (q)	48.99 m
2013	Asian Championships	Pune, India	1st	55.88 m
2013	World Championships	Moscow, Russia	19th (q)	56.87 m
2015	Asian Championships	Wuhan, China	1st	63.90 m
2015	World Championships	Beijing, China	8th	62.90 m
2016	Olympic Games	Rio de Janeiro, Brazil	5th	64.37 m
2017	World Championships	London, United Kingdom	7th	63.37 m
2021	Olympic Games	Tokyo, Japan	20th (q)	58.90 m
