= Te Rina Keenan =

New Zealander athlete (born 1990)

Personal information
- Born: 29 June 1990 (age 35) Auckland, New Zealand
- Education: Massey University; University of Hawaii
- Height: 1.80 m (5 ft 11 in)

Sport
- Sport: Track and field
- Events: Discus throw; Shot put

Te Rina Catherine Keenan (born 29 June 1990 in Auckland) is a New Zealand athlete whose specialty is the discus throw. She competed at the 2015 World Championships in Beijing without qualifying for the final.

Her personal best in the event is 60.78 metres (Hamilton 2015). In addition, she has a best of 16.11 metres in the shot put (Kazan 2013).

== Competition record ==
Year	Competition	Venue	Position	Event	Notes
Representing New Zealand
2006	Oceania Youth Championships	Apia, Samoa	3rd	Shot put	12.24 m
2006	Oceania Youth Championships	Apia, Samoa	1st	Discus throw	44.46 m
2007	World Youth Championships	Ostrava, Czech Republic	9th	Discus throw	43.54 m
2008	World Junior Championships	Bydgoszcz, Poland	18th (q)	Discus throw	47.62 m
2013	Universiade	Kazan, Russia	10th	Shot put	16.11 m
2013	Universiade	Kazan, Russia	6th	Discus throw	52.38 m
2015	Universiade	Gwangju, South Korea	7th	Shot put	15.39 m
2015	Universiade	Gwangju, South Korea	17th (q)	Discus throw	48.98 m
2015	World Championships	Beijing, China	18th (q)	Discus throw	59.20 m
