= Whitney Ashley =

American discus thrower (born 1989)

Personal information
- Born: February 18, 1989 (age 37) Riverside, California, United States
- Height: 5 ft 8 in (1.73 m)

Sport
- Sport: Track and field
- Events: Discus throw, shot put
- College team: San Diego State University

Achievements and titles
- Personal bests: Discus throw 64.80 m (212 ft 7 in) shot put 17.22 m (56 ft 5 3/4 in)
Medal record
Women's athletics
Representing the United States
Athletics at the Summer Olympics
Rio de Janeiro Olympics	Discus
World Championships
Beijing World Championships	Discus
Moscow World Championships	Discus

Whitney Ashley (born February 18, 1989) is an American athlete whose specialty is the discus throw.

She represented her country at three consecutive Global Championships, in 2013, 2015 and 2016, making the 2015 world final. She competed at the Athletics at the 2016 Summer Olympics - Women's discus throw.

Ashley placed first in Discus at 2016 United States Olympic Trials (track and field) to qualify for Athletics at the 2016 Summer Olympics. Ashley placed 6th at 2017 IAAF Diamond League in the discus and qualified for the 2018 IAAF Diamond League final in Memorial Van Damme (Brussels).

== Competition record ==
Year	Competition	Venue	Position	Event	Notes
Representing the United States
2013	World Championships	Moscow, Russia	24th (q)	Discus throw	44.60 m
2015	World Championships	Beijing, China	9th	Discus throw	61.05 m
2016	Olympic Games	Rio de Janeiro, Brazil	–	Discus throw	NM
2017	World Championships	London, United Kingdom	13th (q)	Discus throw	60.94 m
2019	Pan American Games	Lima, Peru	5th	Discus throw	60.27 m

== Personal bests ==
Outdoor

- Shot put – 17.00 m (55 ft 9 1/4 in) (Luzern 2014)
- Discus throw – 64.80 m (212 ft 7 in) (Claremont 2015)

Indoor

- Shot put – 17.62 m (57 ft 9 1/2 in) (Portland 2016)
