= 2014 European Athletics Championships – Women's discus throw =

Women's discus throw at the European Athletics Championships

The women's discus throw at the 2014 European Athletics Championships took place at the Letzigrund on 15 and 16 August.

== Medalists ==
Gold	Sandra Perković; Croatia
Silver	Mélina Robert-Michon; France
Bronze	Shanice Craft; Germany

== Records ==
Standing records prior to the 2014 European Athletics Championships
World record	Gabriele Reinsch (GDR)	76.80 m	Neubrandenburg, East Germany	9 July 1988
European record	Gabriele Reinsch (GDR)	76.80 m	Neubrandenburg, East Germany	9 July 1988
Championship record	Diana Gansky (GDR)	71.36 m	Stuttgart, West Germany	28 August 1986
World Leading	Sandra Perković (CRO)	70.52 m	Shanghai, China	18 May 2014
European Leading	Sandra Perković (CRO)	70.52 m	Shanghai, China	18 May 2014

== Schedule ==
Date	Time	Round
15 August 2014	10:10	Qualification
16 August 2014	16:45	Final

All times are local times (UTC+2)

== Results ==
=== Qualification ===
57.50 (Q) or at least 12 best performers (q) advanced to the Final.

Rank	Group	Name	Nationality	#1	#2	#3	Mark	Note
1	B	Sandra Perković	Croatia	63.93			63.93	Q
2	A	Mélina Robert-Michon	France	63.62			63.62	Q
3	A	Shanice Craft	Germany	61.88			61.88	Q
4	B	Anna Rüh	Germany	59.84			59.84	Q
5	B	Zinaida Sendriūtė	Lithuania	56.76	58.69		58.69	Q
6	B	Yekaterina Strokova	Russia	53.86	58.35		58.35	Q
7	A	Julia Fischer	Germany	54.92	57.78		57.78	Q
8	A	Yuliya Maltseva	Russia	x	57.73		57.73	Q
9	B	Eliška Staňková	Czech Republic	51.41	51.61	55.79	55.79	q
10	B	Sanna Kämäräinen	Finland	54.01	53.93	54.64	54.64	q
11	B	Sofia Larsson	Sweden	54.22	x	x	54.22	q
12	A	Jitka Kubelová	Czech Republic	52.52	49.56	53.82	53.82	q
13	B	Valentina Aniballi	Italy	53.60	x	51.16	53.60	
14	A	Irina Rodrigues	Portugal	51.69	52.53	51.53	52.53	
15	A	Julia Wiberg	Sweden	x	52.40	50.81	52.40	
16	A	Dragana Tomašević	Serbia	52.21	x	x	52.21	
17	B	Androniki Lada	Cyprus	49.13	x	52.18	52.18	
18	A	Hrisoula Anagnostopoulou	Greece	x	x	51.08	51.08	
19	A	Katri Hirvonen	Finland	x	50.93	x	50.93	
20	B	Grete Etholm	Norway	49.31	50.83	50.55	50.83	
21	B	Nataliya Semenova	Ukraine	x	x	46.57	46.57	
	A	Sabina Asenjo	Spain	x	x	x	NM	

=== Final ===
Rank	Name	Nationality	#1	#2	#3	#4	#5	#6	Result	Notes
1st place, gold medalist(s)	Sandra Perković	Croatia	64.58	67.37	68.78	x	71.08	x	71.08	WL, NR
2nd place, silver medalist(s)	Mélina Robert-Michon	France	55.08	62.96	59.05	65.33	x	62.18	65.33	
3rd place, bronze medalist(s)	Shanice Craft	Germany	62.36	64.33	61.33	64.01	62.66	60.71	64.33	
4	Anna Rüh	Germany	62.46	60.34	59.46	60.61	58.84	60.96	62.46	
5	Julia Fischer	Germany	58.97	61.20	55.51	59.26	x	x	61.20	
6	Zinaida Sendriūtė	Lithuania	57.93	59.16	57.07	60.65	58.01	58.26	60.65	
7	Sanna Kämäräinen	Finland	60.52	55.53	x	58.16	x	56.47	60.52	PB
8	Yuliya Maltseva	Russia	60.40	x	57.53	x	59.09	x	60.40	
9	Yekaterina Strokova	Russia	59.02	58.91	59.13				59.13	
10	Eliška Staňková	Czech Republic	55.88	52.29	x				55.88	
11	Sofia Larsson	Sweden	51.81	x	x				51.81	
12	Jitka Kubelová	Czech Republic	47.58	50.54	50.09				50.54	
