= Sandra Elkasević =

Croatian discus thrower (born 1990)

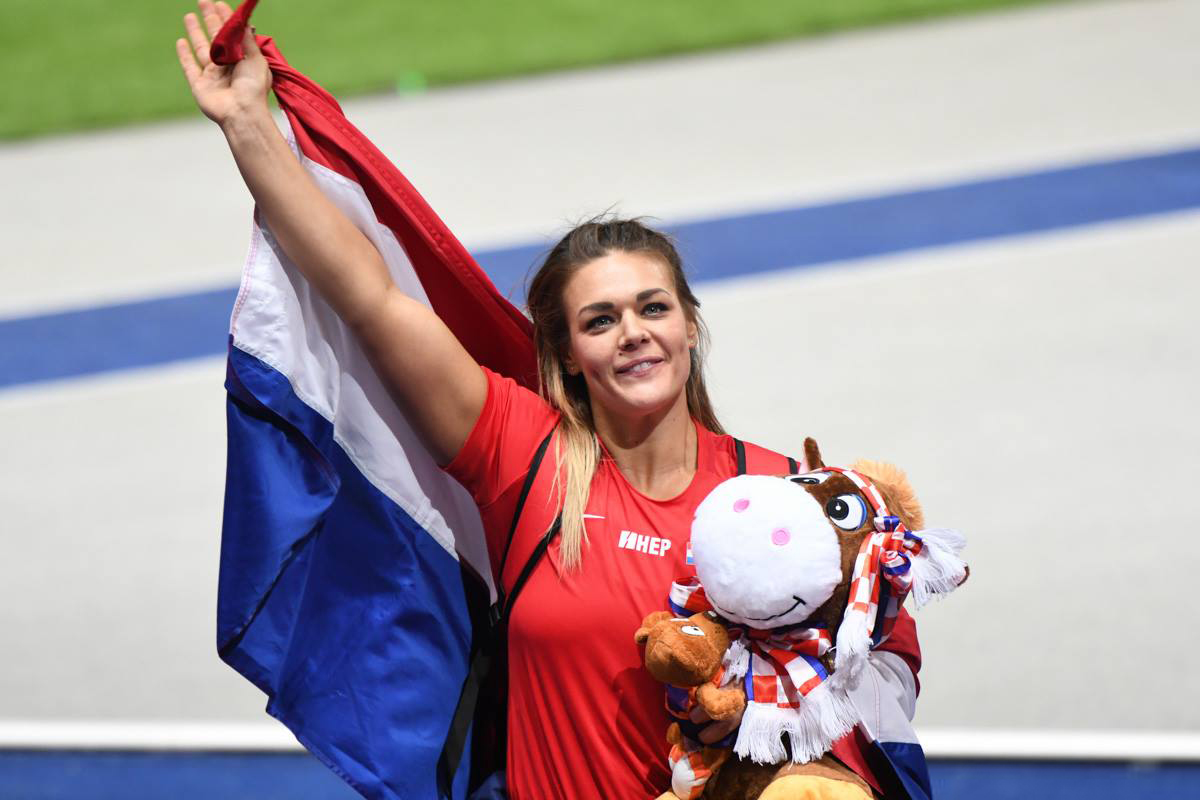
- Elkasević at the 2018 European Athletics Championships in Berlin

Personal information
- Nationality: Croatian
- Born: Sandra Perković; 21 June 1990 (age 36) Zagreb, SR Croatia, SFR Yugoslavia
- Home town: Zagreb, Croatia
- Height: 1.83 m (6 ft 0 in)
- Weight: 85 kg (187 lb)
- Spouse: Edis Elkasević (m. 2023)

Sport
- Country: Croatia
- Sport: Athletics
- Event: Discus throw
- Club: HAAK Mladost; Dinamo Zrinjevac
- Coached by: Edis Elkasević

Achievements and titles
- Highest world ranking: 1st (2012, 2013, 2014, 2016, 2017, 2018)
- Personal bests: Discus throw: 71.41 NR (Bellinzona 2017); Shot put: 16.40 (Split 2011); Indoors; Shot put: 16.99i (Rijeka 2011)
Medal record
Women's athletics
Representing Croatia
Olympic Games
Gold medal – first place	2012 London	Discus throw
Gold medal – first place	2016 Rio de Janeiro	Discus throw
Bronze medal – third place	2024 Paris	Discus throw
World Championships
Gold medal – first place	2013 Moscow	Discus throw
Gold medal – first place	2017 London	Discus throw
Silver medal – second place	2015 Beijing	Discus throw
Silver medal – second place	2022 Eugene	Discus throw
Bronze medal – third place	2019 Doha	Discus throw
Diamond League
First place	2012	Discus throw
First place	2013	Discus throw
First place	2014	Discus throw
First place	2015	Discus throw
First place	2016	Discus throw
First place	2017	Discus throw
European Championships
Gold medal – first place	2010 Barcelona	Discus throw
Gold medal – first place	2012 Helsinki	Discus throw
Gold medal – first place	2014 Zürich	Discus throw
Gold medal – first place	2016 Amsterdam	Discus throw
Gold medal – first place	2018 Berlin	Discus throw
Gold medal – first place	2022 Munich	Discus throw
Gold medal – first place	2024 Rome	Discus throw
Mediterranean Games
Gold medal – first place	2013 Mersin	Discus Throw
Gold medal – first place	2018 Tarragona	Discus Throw
Continental Cup
Silver medal – second place	2010 Split	Discus throw
Bronze medal – third place	2014 Marrakesh	Discus throw
World Junior Championships
Bronze medal – third place	2008 Bydgoszcz	Discus throw
European Junior Championships
Gold medal – first place	2009 Novi Sad	Discus throw
Silver medal – second place	2007 Hengelo	Discus throw
World Youth Championships
Silver medal – second place	2007 Ostrava	Discus throw
European Youth Olympic Festival
Silver medal – second place	2007 Belgrade	Discus throw

Sandra Elkasević (née Perković; born 21 June 1990) is a Croatian discus thrower. She is a two-time Olympic (2012 London, 2016 Rio) and world (2013, 2017) champion and a record seven-time European champion (2010, 2012, 2014, 2016, 2018, 2022, 2024) which makes her the most decorated female discus thrower in history. She is also a seven-time Diamond League winner, prevailing in 46 circuit's meetings.

Elkasević culminated her successful junior career by winning gold at the 2009 European Junior Championships with a new national record. A month later, she made the final of the World Championships as the youngest discus thrower in the field.

In her first year of senior competition she won gold at the 2010 European Championships, becoming the youngest ever European champion in the women's discus throw. A six-month doping suspension after testing positive for a banned psychostimulant kept her out of competition for most of the 2011 season, including the World Championships, but she successfully defended her title at the 2012 European Championships. She was named the BTA Best Balkan Athlete of the Year in 2016.

She is coached by Edis Elkasević, whom she married in 2023. Her personal best and national record is 71.41 metres, set in July 2017 at the Galà dei Castelli meeting in Bellinzona, Switzerland. At the time, it was the longest discus throw by a female athlete in 25 years.

She became a member of the Croatian Parliament after the 2015 general election for the 8th Sabor. She was MP for less than a year.

== Early life and junior career ==
Elkasević started with athletics in the second grade of elementary school, and also played basketball and volleyball. By the 6th grade, athletics prevailed and Elkasević concentrated on shot put and discus throw. In 2001, she joined the Dinamo-Zrinjevac athletics club. Since 2004 she has been coached by former Olympic shot putter Ivan Ivančić, who recognized her talent in discus throw. In her first year with the new coach, she improved her personal best from 32 to over 50 meters, as Ivančić had predicted.

First successes in discus throw came in 2006. In her first major competition, the 2006 World Junior Championships, Elkasević failed to make the final, but became a regular international medalist thereafter, winning silver medals in both the World Youth Championships and the European Junior Championships in 2007, and a bronze in the 2008 World Junior Championships. She was ranked 5th in the 2008 junior world list with 55.89 m.

Elkasević suffered a very serious setback in early 2009, after doctors misdiagnosed her appendicitis. Her appendix burst after three days, which caused a near-fatal sepsis that required two emergency surgeries and a lengthy recovery. She lost 15 kilograms (33 lb) of body weight in the process and was initially not expected to return to full training before the end of the year. However, Elkasević resumed training after a three-month break, and returned to competition by winning the discus throw gold medal at the European Junior Championships in Novi Sad in July 2009, where she set a new national record with a 62.44 m throw, and also met the A standard for the World Championships. Her performance was the best in the European Junior Championships for 20 years, with a winning margin of 7 meters and 33 centimeters, the largest in the history of the Championships. Her other two legal marks in the final would also have been sufficient for the gold. A month later, she placed 9th at her first major senior competition, the World Championships in Athletics held in Berlin, as the youngest discus thrower in the field, including the qualifiers. Later in the year she improved the national record to 62.79 m. Her throws ultimately captured top eleven spots in the 2009 junior discus throw world list.

Following her successful 2009 season, she was named by the SPIKES magazine as one of "ten rising stars to watch in 2010", and received the Croatian Olympic Committee's Dražen Petrović Award as the most promising Croatian female athlete in 2009.

== Senior career ==
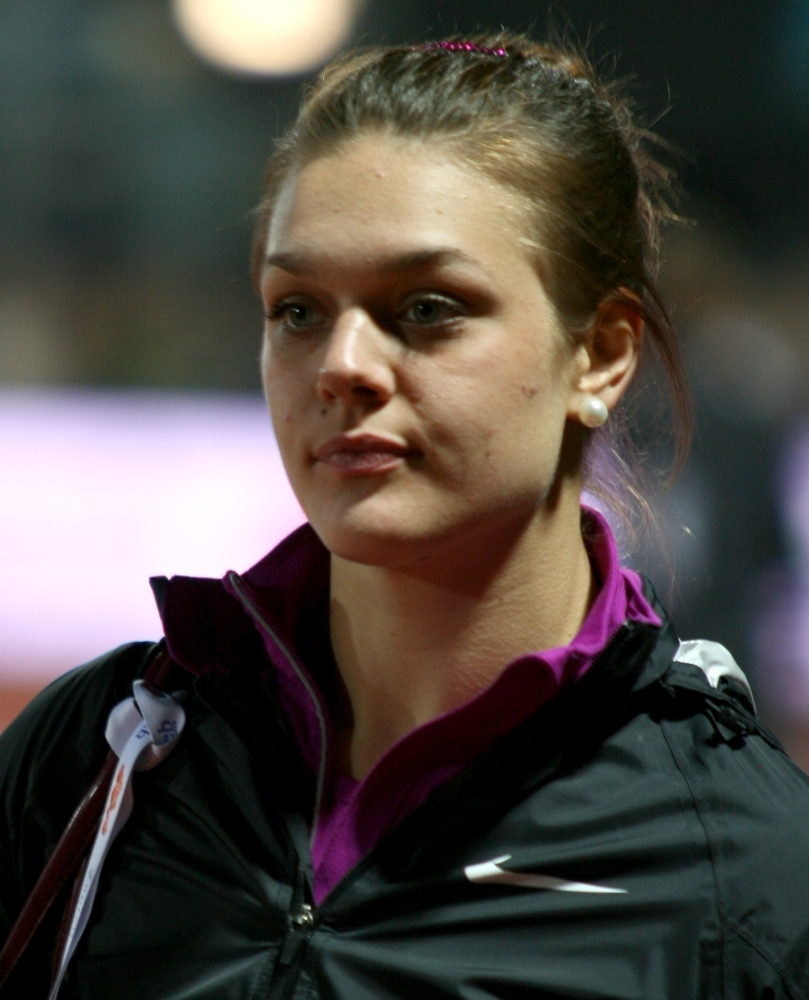
Elkasević at the Hanžeković Memorial in Zagreb in 2010.

Sandra Elkasević

Member of the Croatian Parliament for the 2nd electoral district
- In office 28 December 2015 – 14 October 2016
- Prime Minister: Zoran Milanović; Tihomir Orešković

Personal details
- Party: Milan Bandić 365 – The Party of Labour and Solidarity (2015–)

At the Croatian Winter Throws Championship held on 6 March 2010 in Split, Elkasević massively improved her personal best to 66.85 m, setting a 2010 world leading mark and surpassing the 2009 world best of 66.40 m, set by Li Yanfeng. On the same day, Elkasević set her outdoor personal best in shot put, at 16.02 m. She continued her strong throwing by taking gold in the under-23 section of the women's discus at the European Cup Winter Throwing meeting in Arles; her winning mark of 61.93 m would have been enough for silver in the senior competition.

In June, Elkasević took gold in both discus throw and shot put in the Second League of the 2010 European Team Championships, helping her national team move up into the First League competition in 2011.

Her good form in 2010 culminated at the European Championships in Barcelona, where she won a gold medal in discus throw. Elkasević struggled in the qualification and was even close to elimination as she failed to make the qualifying norm of 60.00 m, placing only 10th out of 12 athletes to advance to the final. However, in the final she made a strong opening round throw which kept her in silver medal position until the last, 6th round, when she made a winning throw of 64.67 m, becoming the youngest ever European champion in women's discus throw.

In the IAAF Diamond League final at Memorial van Damme in Brussels, Elkasević won with the new national record of 66.93 m, and finished her first Diamond League season in second place overall, after Yarelis Barrios. Shortly after her victory at the Hanžeković Memorial in Zagreb on 1 September, Elkasević concluded the 2010 season by winning silver at the IAAF Continental Cup in Split. European Athletics recognised her senior breakthrough year by giving her the European Athletics Rising Star of the Year award.

In February 2011, Elkasević won the discus throw at the Croatian Winter Throws Championship in Split and further improved her national record to 67.96 m. In the same competition she also set the national record in shot put, at 16.40 m. Just days later, Elkasević suffered a back injury that forced her to miss the European Cup Winter Throwing in March. She returned to competition in May by winning the Diamond League discus throw event in Shanghai.

=== Doping suspension ===
In June 2011, it was announced that Elkasević had failed two doping tests conducted in the month before at the Diamond League meetings in Rome and Shanghai. She tested positive for methylhexanamine, a psychostimulant banned by the World Anti-Doping Agency since 2010. Elkasević stated that the positive results were due to Nox Pump, an American-made energy drink product she had been using without knowing it contained banned substances. She did not request an analysis of her B-sample.

The Croatian Athletics Federation "recognized that Perkovic had no intention to take nor was aware of taking a stimulant" and gave her a six-month suspension, later confirmed by the IAAF. In accordance with the IAAF rules, all marks set after her first positive test were annulled, including the mark of 69.99 m set on 4 June 2011 in Varaždin, despite the fact that she tested negative in that competition. The 69.99 m mark would have been the best in the world in the last twelve years. The suspension ran until 7 December, keeping Elkasević out of competition for the rest of the 2011 season, including the World Championships.

=== 2012 season ===
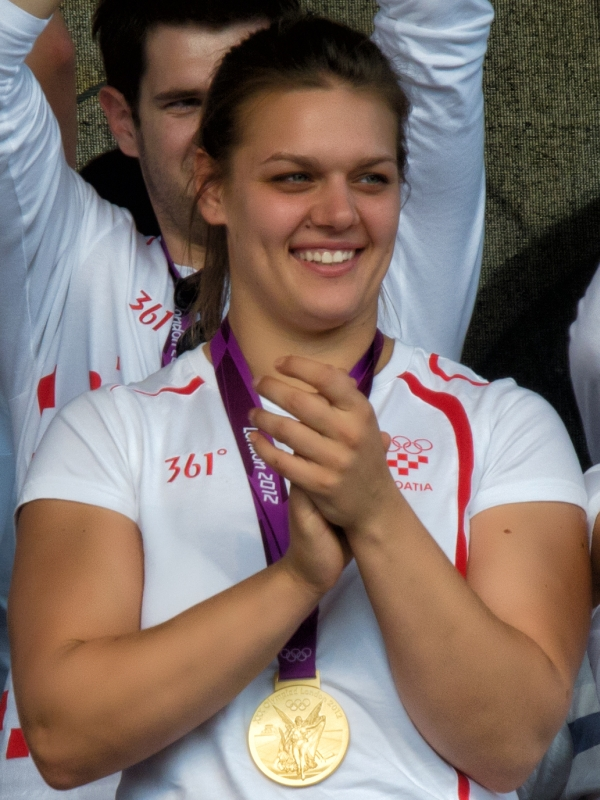
Sandra Elkasević with her 2012 London Olympic gold medal.

She returned from her ban in 2012 and continued to throw well: she won the under-23 section at the 2012 European Cup Winter Throwing, set a national record of 68.24 m at the Shanghai Golden Grand Prix, then broke the meet record at the Prefontaine Classic in June. By surpassing the Olympic A standard of 62.00 m, Elkasević qualified for the 2012 Summer Olympics.

In the European Championships in Helsinki, Elkasević's main rival was Nadine Müller of Germany, the 2011 World Championships silver medalist and the 2012 world leading discus thrower with 68.89 m. After successfully qualifying, Elkasević found herself in serious trouble in the final after posting two no-throws. Under pressure, she threw 67.62 m in the third round, which ultimately proved too good for Müller and the rest of the field, and gave Elkasević her second European title.

At the 2012 Summer Olympics Elkasević won the gold medal with a new national record of 69.11 m.

=== 2013 season ===
Elkasević backed up her Olympic victory by winning the 2013 World Championship in Moscow.

=== 2014 season ===
In 2014, she completed the triple of major championships winning the 2014 European Championship with another personal best of 71.08m in Zurich. Two weeks later, in the same Zurich stadium, Elkasević completed the 2014 Diamond League season with another win on the same day her original coach Ivan Ivančić died.

=== 2015 season ===
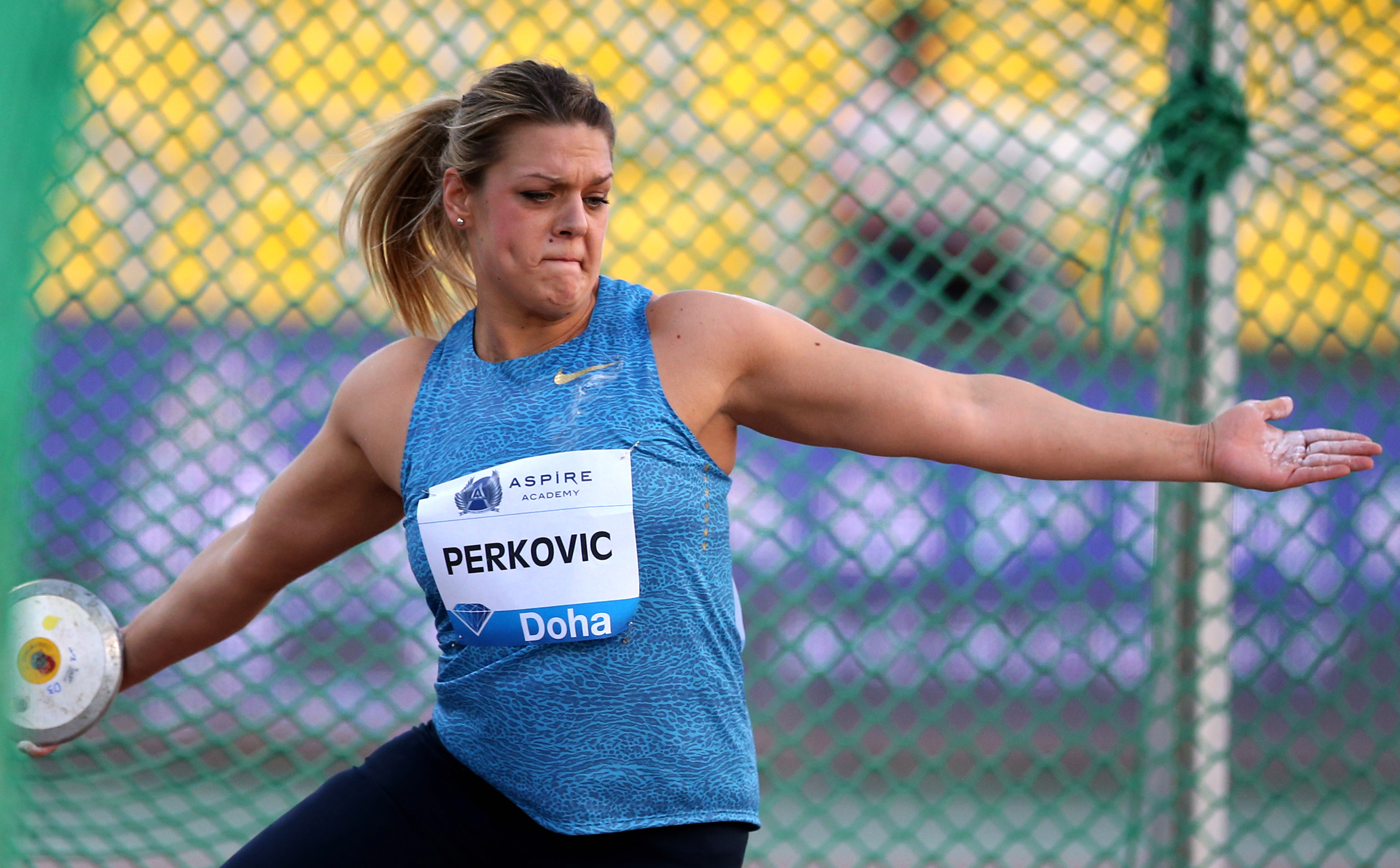
Elkasević at the 2015 Qatar Athletic Super Grand Prix in Doha.

In 2015, Elkasević took silver in the 2015 World Championships with her final round effort.

=== 2016 season ===
In 2016, Elkasević completed a perfect season winning all eleven competitions she entered, including the Olympic Games and European Championships.

Her Olympic title was won with her one successful throw (her third-round effort following two fouls and before three subsequent fouls), a distance of 69.21 m – 2 metres further than any other thrower achieved.

=== 2017 season ===
2017 saw another near perfect season with nine out of eleven wins in all competitions including the World Championships in London.

Just before the World Championships she threw a national record of 71.41 m, the world-leading throw for that year and the longest in 25 years.

=== 2018 season ===
2018 was another successful season with Elkasević winning the European Championships and losing only twice. However, those two losses were in the Diamond League Final and the IAAF Continental Cup. At 2018 Paavo Nurmi games, Elkasević had a friendly arm wrestling challenge with a Finnish discus thrower and a fellow competitor Sanna Kämäräinen and Elkasević won the arm wrestling.

=== 2019 season ===
This season saw Elkasević's world dominance end with bronze at the 2019 World Championships behind the Cuban pair of Yaime Pérez and Denia Caballero.

Elkasević never equalled the distances of the previous few seasons, only winning three of the nine finals she competed in.

=== 2020 season ===
2020 was a quiet season but Elkasević won several competitions in Croatia.

=== 2021 season ===
Elkasević finished outside the medals in 4th place at the postponed 2020 Tokyo Olympics.

=== 2022 season ===
Elkasević opened season with win at the Easter competition in Split (66.16 m), reaching 2nd place in overall season ranking. Twenty days later, she was second at the Diamond League competition in Birmingham, with her season best (67.26 m). A week later she repeated second place at the Prefontaine Classic in Eugene (65.50 m). She improved her season best at the Stade Charléty in Paris on 18 June (68.19 m).

She took silver at the 2022 World Championships. Elkasević managed to qualify for the final with the first throw (64.23 m). She opened the final with 67.74 m, and her second throw (68.45 m) gained her silver medal, fifth in the career.

Winning gold at the 2022 European Championships made her the first athlete ever to win six individual titles at the European Athletics Championships. She came to the championship with Europe leading result from Oregon. She finished first both in qualifications and the final, hitting 67.95 m in the fifth round for the victory.

In September, she finished second at the Diamond League Finals in Zurich (67.31 m).

=== 2023 season ===
Elkasević opened the season in June with second place at the Diamond League competition in Paris (65.18 m). A week later she was third at the DL competition in Oslo (65.26 m). On July 2 she reached victory at the DL competition in Stockholm (64.49 m), her 46th in career.

On the World Championship in Budapest, she qualified with third result and her season best (65.62 m). She improved her season best in the final (66.57 m), finishing fifth. This was her seventh appearance on the World Athletics Championships.

She finished second at the DL event in Xiamen, with her season best (67.32 m). She improved her season best a week later at the Hanžeković Memorial in Zagreb (67.71 m), winning it for 11th time in her career.

== Achievements ==
=== International competitions ===
Note: Only the position and distance in the final are indicated, unless otherwise stated. (q) means the athlete did not qualify for the final, with the overall position and distance in the qualification round indicated.

Representing Croatia
Year	Competition	Venue	Position	Notes
2006	World Junior Championships	Beijing, China	10th (q)	44.11 m
2007	World Youth Championships	Ostrava, Czech Republic	2nd	51.25 m
2007	European Junior Championships	Hengelo, Netherlands	2nd	55.42 m
2008	World Junior Championships	Bydgoszcz, Poland	7th (q)	15.03 m
2008	World Junior Championships	Bydgoszcz, Poland	3rd	54.24 m
2009	European Junior Championships	Novi Sad, Serbia	1st	62.44 m
2009	World Championships	Berlin, Germany	9th	60.77 m
2010	European Championships	Barcelona, Spain	1st	64.67 m
2012	European Championships	Helsinki, Finland	1st	67.62 m
2012	Olympic Games	London, United Kingdom	1st	69.11 m
2013	Mediterranean Games	Mersin, Turkey	1st	66.21 m
2013	World Championships	Moscow, Russia	1st	67.99 m
2014	European Championships	Zurich, Switzerland	1st	71.08 m
2015	World Championships	Beijing, China	2nd	67.39 m
2016	European Championships	Amsterdam, Netherlands	1st	69.97 m
2016	Olympic Games	Rio de Janeiro, Brazil	1st	69.21 m
2017	World Championships	London, United Kingdom	1st	70.31 m
2018	Mediterranean Games	Tarragona, Spain	1st	66.46 m
2018	European Championships	Berlin, Germany	1st	67.62 m
2019	World Championships	Doha, Qatar	3rd	66.72 m
2021	Olympic Games	Tokyo, Japan	4th	65.01 m
2022	World Championships	Eugene, United States	2nd	68.45 m
2022	European Championships	Munich, Germany	1st	67.95 m
2023	World Championships	Budapest, Hungary	5th	66.57 m
2024	European Championships	Rome, Italy	1st	67.04 m
2024	Olympic Games	Paris, France	3rd	67.51 m
2025	World Championships	Tokyo, Japan	5th	65.82 m

=== Circuit wins and titles ===
- IAAF Diamond League discus throw Overall winner: 2012, 2013, 2014, 2015, 2016
- IAAF Diamond League discus throw champion: 2017
  - 2010 (2): New York, Brussels
  - 2012 (6): Shanghai, Eugene, Oslo, Monaco, Stockholm, Zürich
  - 2013 (7): Doha, New York, Rome, Birmingham, Lausanne, Monaco, Brussels
  - 2014 (6): Shanghai, Eugene, Oslo, Paris, Stockholm, Zürich
  - 2015 (6): Doha, Rome, Birmingham, New York, Monaco, Brussels
  - 2016 (7): Shanghai, Eugene, Oslo, Stockholm, London, Paris, Zürich
  - 2017 (4): Shanghai, Oslo, Birmingham, Brussels
  - 2018 (4): Doha, Rome, Paris, London
  - 2021 (2): Florence, Paris
  - 2022 (1): Oslo

=== Awards ===
- Croatian sportswoman of the year by Sportske novosti (9): 2012, 2013, 2014, 2015, 2016, 2017, 2018, 2019, 2022.
- BTA Best Balkan Athlete of the Year: 2016
- Croatian sportswoman of the year by Croatian Olympic Committee (9): 2022.

== Political career ==
Elkasević was a candidate at the 2015 general election in which she stood for the populist Bandić Milan 365 – Labour and Solidarity Party as second on the party list for the 2nd electoral district. The party gained one seat from the electoral district but since the list leader, who was Mayor of Zagreb Milan Bandić himself, did not take his seat due to incompatibility of the positions of mayor and MP, Elkasević became a member of the Croatian Parliament and took the oath of office at the first session. However, she did not participate in the work of the Parliament since she didn't come to a single session besides the first, constitutive one. Her term ended on 15 July 2016 with Parliament's self-dissolution which triggered extraordinary parliamentary election. During this term, Elkasević served as a member of the Parliament's Committee on the Family, Youth and Sports.

== Personal life ==
Elkasević is a devout Roman Catholic. She speaks Croatian and English fluently and has a basic understanding of Italian. On 31 December 2023, she married her long-time boyfriend and coach Edis Elkasević.

Awards
Preceded by (Norway) Karoline Bjerkeli Grøvdal	Women's European Athletics Rising Star of the Year; 2010	Succeeded by (United Kingdom) Jodie Williams
Sporting positions
Preceded by (China) Li Yanfeng	Women's Discus Best Year Performance; 2012–2014	Succeeded by (Cuba) Denia Caballero
Preceded by (Cuba) Denia Caballero	Women's Discus Best Year Performance; 2016–2018	Succeeded by (Cuba) Yaime Pérez
