= Athletics at the 2010 South American Games – Women's hammer throw =

The Women's Hammer Throw event at the 2010 South American Games was held on March 20 at 17:00.

== Medalists ==
Gold	Silver	Bronze
Andressa de Morais; Brazil	Carla Michel; Brazil	Dukina Freytters; Venezuela

== Records ==
Standing records prior to the 2010 South American Games
World record	Anita Włodarczyk	Poland	77.96m	Berlin, Germany	22 August 2009
World Leading	Tatyana Lysenko	Russia	75.66m	Adler, Russia	25 February 2010
South American record	Jennifer Dahlgren	Argentina	72.94m	Athens, Greece	13 April 2007
South American U23 record	Jennifer Dahlgren	Argentina	72.01m	Greensboro, United States	27 May 2006

== Results ==
Results were published.

=== Final ===
Rank	Athlete	Nationality	Attempt						Best Result	Notes
Rank	Athlete	Nationality	1	2	3	4	5	6	Best Result	Notes
1st place, gold medalist(s)	Andressa de Morais	Brazil	51.01	54.57	x	x	53.64	55.95	55.95	
2nd place, silver medalist(s)	Carla Michel	Brazil	55.24	x	x	52.98	x	55.42	55.42	
3rd place, bronze medalist(s)	Dukina Freytters	Venezuela	54.79	55.13	x	55.38	54.08	53.06	55.38	
4	Valeria Chiliquinga	Ecuador	51.42	52.72	x	x	x	46.16	52.72	
5	Zuleyma Mina	Ecuador	x	x	x	x	x	51.48	51.48	
6	Fátima Ramos	(Peru) Perú	x	48.16	50.24	51.12	49.16	50.60	51.12	NR
7	Julia Núñez	Argentina	50.30	x	50.70	x	x	49.09	50.70	
8	Tatiana Martínez	Colombia	x	41.53	46.50	x	45.86	44.38	46.50	

== See also ==
- 2010 South American Under-23 Championships in Athletics
