= Edis Elkasević =

Bosnian-born Croatian athletics coach and retired shot putter

Personal information
- Born: 18 February 1983 (age 43) Prijedor, SR Bosnia and Herzegovina, Yugoslavia
- Height: 1.98 m (6 ft 6 in)
- Weight: 118 kg (260 lb)
- Spouse: Sandra Perković (m. 2023)

Sport
- Sport: Track and field
- Event: Shot put
Medal record
Men's Athletics
Representing Croatia
Mediterranean Games
Gold medal – first place	2005 Almería	Shot Put
World Junior Championships
Gold medal – first place	2002 Kingston	Shot Put

Edis Elkasević (born 18 February 1983) is a Bosnian-born Croatian athletics coach and retired shot putter.

He won the 2002 World Junior Championships. He did not quite adapt to an international senior level, but competed at the 2004 Olympic Games and the 2005 World Championships without reaching the final.

Representing the Auburn Tigers track and field team, Elkasević won the 2005 NCAA Division I Outdoor Track and Field Championships in the shot put.

His personal best throw is 20.94 metres, achieved in June 2005 in Velenje. With the junior shot (6 kg) he has 21.96 metres, achieved in June 2002 in Zagreb. This was the junior world record until June 2009, when it was surpassed by David Storl. He also has 60.54 metres in the discus throw, achieved in May 2005 in La Jolla, California.

Since 2013, Elkasević has coached Sandra Perković, a multiple World, Olympic and European discus throw champion. The two married on 31 December 2023.
