= Gia Lewis-Smallwood =

American discus thrower

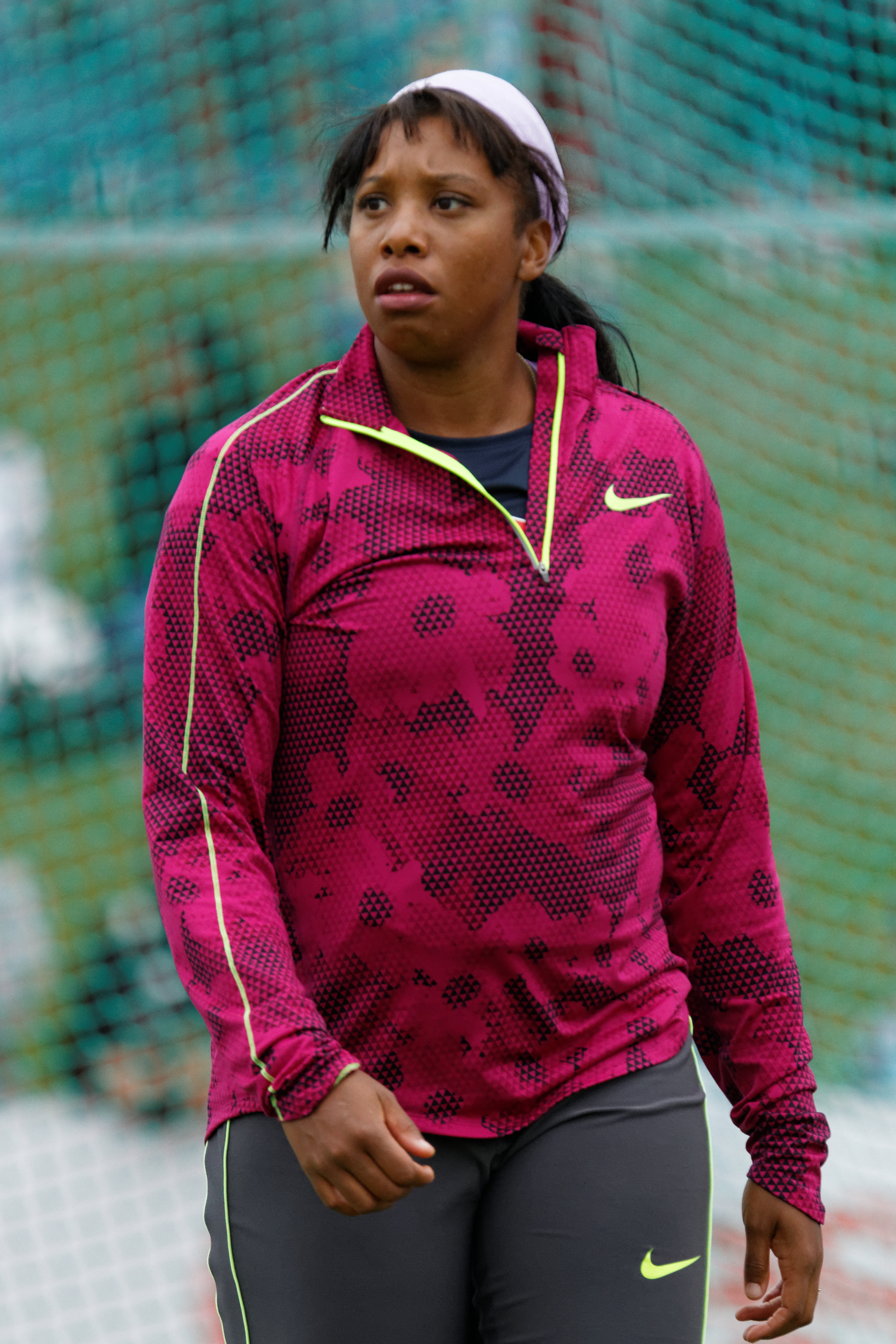
- Lewis-Smallwood at the DécaNation 2014

Personal information
- Born: April 1, 1979 (age 47) Champaign, Illinois, U.S.
- Height: 1.83 m (6 ft 0 in)
- Weight: 93 kg (205 lb)

Sport
- Country: United States
- Sport: Athletics
- Event: Discus
Medal record
Women's athletics
IAAF Continental Cup
Gold medal – first place	2014 Marrakesh	Discus throw
Pan American Games
Bronze medal – third place	2015 Toronto	Discus throw
- Updated on August 14, 2012

Gia Lewis-Smallwood (born April 1, 1979) is an American track and field athlete who specialises in the discus throw. She competed at the 2012 Summer Olympics in the discus throw event, finishing 15th in the qualifying round and not advancing to the final.

Lewis-Smallwood competed for the Illinois Fighting Illini track and field team, and was inducted into their hall of fame in 2020.

She holds the American record in an unofficial event: the indoor discus throw at 55.03 m.

== International competitions ==
Year	Competition	Venue	Position	Notes
Representing the United States
2011	World Championships	Daegu, South Korea	15th (q)	59.49 m
2012	Olympic Games	London, United Kingdom	15th (q)	61.44 m
2013	World Championships	Moscow, Russia	5th	64.23 m
2014	IAAF Continental Cup	Marrakesh, Morocco	1st	64.55 m
2015	Pan American Games	Toronto, Canada	3rd	61.26 m
2015	World Championships	Beijing, China	11th	60.55 m
2017	World Championships	London, United Kingdom	17th (q)	58.15 m
