= 2017 World Championships in Athletics – Women's discus throw =

Women's discus throw at the 2017 World Championships
- Venue: Olympic Stadium
- Dates: 11 August (qualification); 13 August (final)
- Competitors: 30 from 19 nations
- Winning distance: 70.31

Medalists
gold medal	Sandra Perković	Croatia
silver medal	Dani Stevens	Australia
bronze medal	Mélina Robert-Michon	France

The women's discus throw at the 2017 World Championships in Athletics was held at the Olympic Stadium on 11 and 13 August.

== Records ==
Before the competition records were as follows:

Record	Perf.	Athlete	Nat.	Date	Location
World	76.80	Gabriele Reinsch	GDR	7 Jul 1988	Neubrandenburg, East Germany
Championship	71.62	Martina Hellmann	GDR	31 Aug 1987	Rome, Italy
World leading	71.41	Sandra Perković	CRO	18 Jul 2017	Bellinzona, Switzerland
African	64.87	Elizna Naudé	RSA	2 Mar 2003	Stellenbosch, South Africa
Asian	71.68	Xiao Yanling	CHN	14 Mar 1992	Beijing, China
NACAC	70.88	Hilda Ramos	CUB	8 May 1992	Havana, Cuba
South American	64.21	Andressa de Morais	BRA	10 Jun 2012	Barquisimeto, Venezuela
European	76.80	Gabriele Reinsch	GDR	7 Jul 1988	Neubrandenburg, East Germany
Oceanian	68.72	Daniela Costian	AUS	22 Jan 1994	Auckland, New Zealand

The following records were set at the competition:

Record	Perf.	Athlete	Nat.	Date
Oceanian	69.64	Dani Stevens	AUS	13 Aug 2017
Australian	69.64	Dani Stevens	AUS	13 Aug 2017

== Qualification standard ==
The standard to qualify automatically for entry was 61.20 metres.

== Schedule ==
The event schedule, in local time (UTC+1), is as follows:

Date	Time	Round
11 August	10:10	Qualification
13 August	19:10	Final

== Results ==
=== Qualification ===
The qualification round took place on 11 August, in two groups, with Group A starting at 10:11 and Group B at 11:36. Athletes attaining a mark of at least 62.50 metres ( Q ) or at least the 12 best performers ( q ) qualified for the final. The overall results were as follows:

Rank	Group	Name	Nationality	Round			Mark	Notes
Rank	Group	Name	Nationality	1	2	3	Mark	Notes
1	A	Sandra Perković	Croatia	x	69.67		69.67	Q
2	B	Yaime Pérez	Cuba	65.58			65.58	Q
3	B	Dani Stevens	Australia	65.56			65.56	Q
4	B	Mélina Robert-Michon	France	63.97			63.97	Q, SB
5	A	Denia Caballero	Cuba	58.77	x	63.79	63.79	Q
6	B	Nadine Müller	Germany	60.31	62.47	63.35	63.35	Q
7	B	Su Xinyue	China	60.83	61.35	63.00	63.00	Q
8	A	Andressa de Morais	Brazil	60.61	62.80		62.80	Q
9	B	Chen Yang	China	x	62.71		62.71	Q
10	A	Feng Bin	China	62.48	x	61.95	62.48	q
11	A	Julia Harting	Germany	61.34	61.70	59.41	61.70	q
12	B	Zinaida Sendriūtė	Lithuania	61.48	x	57.57	61.48	q, SB
13	B	Whitney Ashley	United States	x	60.94	59.22	60.94	
14	A	Anna Rüh	Germany	60.78	60.66	x	60.78	
15	B	Shadae Lawrence	Jamaica	x	59.25	x	59.25	
16	B	Fernanda Martins	Brazil	58.51	x	x	58.51	
17	A	Gia Lewis-Smallwood	United States	x	58.15	58.13	58.15	
18	A	Jade Lally	Great Britain & N.I.	x	x	57.71	57.71	
19	B	Dragana Tomašević	Serbia	56.14	57.78	57.28	57.78	
20	A	Sabina Asenjo	Spain	57.00	x	x	57.00	
21	B	Irina Rodrigues	Portugal	54.94	55.87	56.98	56.98	
22	A	Hrisoula Anagnostopoulou	Greece	56.91	56.08	55.26	56.91	
23	A	Kellion Knibb	Jamaica	x	x	56.73	56.73	
24	A	Anita Márton	Hungary	55.96	54.91	x	55.96	
25	A	Natalia Semenova	Ukraine	x	x	55.83	55.83	
26	B	Subenrat Insaeng	Thailand	53.74	x	55.16	55.16	
27	A	Taryn Gollshewsky	Australia	54.29	x	53.69	54.29	
28	B	Valarie Allman	United States	53.85	x	x	53.85	
29	B	Karen Gallardo	Chile	52.36	x	52.81	52.81	
	A	Tara-Sue Barnett	Jamaica	x	x	x	NM	

=== Final ===
The final took place on 13 August at 20:25. The overall results were as follows:

Rank	Name	Nationality	Round						Mark	Notes
Rank	Name	Nationality	1	2	3	4	5	6	Mark	Notes
1st place, gold medalist(s)	Sandra Perković	Croatia	69.30	70.31	70.28	69.81	x	x	70.31	
2nd place, silver medalist(s)	Dani Stevens	Australia	64.23	65.46	x	66.82	66.59	69.64	69.64	AR
3rd place, bronze medalist(s)	Mélina Robert-Michon	France	65.49	62.54	x	61.88	65.39	66.21	66.21	SB
4	Yaime Pérez	Cuba	62.54	x	x	64.82	63.43	64.60	64.82	
5	Denia Caballero	Cuba	63.22	62.88	x	62.18	64.37	x	64.37	
6	Nadine Müller	Germany	64.13	x	62.49	x	63.71	x	64.13	
7	Su Xinyue	China	x	60.59	63.37	x	61.12	62.05	63.37	
8	Feng Bin	China	61.56	60.81	x	x	51.95	x	61.56	
9	Julia Harting	Germany	61.34	x	x				61.34	
10	Chen Yang	China	58.19	x	61.28				61.28	
11	Andressa de Morais	Brazil	60.00	x	x				60.00	
12	Zinaida Sendriūtė	Lithuania	x	x	x				NM	
