= Julia Harting =

German discus thrower

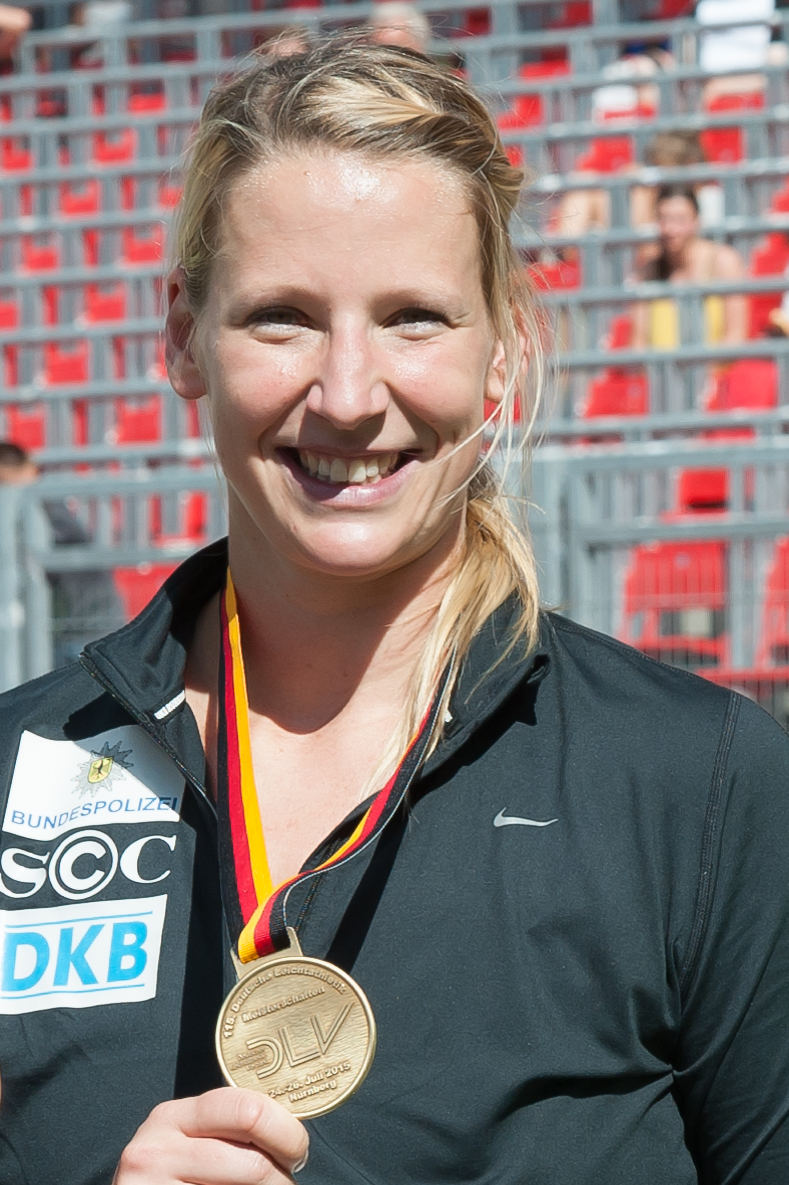
- Fischer 2015

Personal information
- Other names: Julia Fischer
- Born: 1 April 1990 (age 36) Berlin, Germany
- Height: 1.92 m (6 ft 4 in)
- Weight: 95 kg (209 lb)

Sport
- Country: Germany
- Sport: Athletics
- Event: Discus throw

Achievements and titles
- Regional finals: 5th at the 2012 European Athletics Championships
- National finals: 2nd at the 2012 German Athletics Championships
- Personal best(s): Discus: 68.49 m ( Halle, May 2016)
Medal record
European Championships
Silver medal – second place	2016 Amsterdam	Discus throw

Julia Harting (née Fischer; born 1 April 1990 in Berlin) is a German athlete who specialises in the discus throw. She won the silver medal at the 2016 European Championships, and has represented Germany at two Olympics (2012 and 2016).

She was a u18 World Champion in 2007.

Fischer represented Germany at the 2012 European Athletics Championships where she finished 5th in the discus event with a throw of 62.10 metres. She also finished in 5th at the 2015 World Championships.

Julia Harting is married to German discus thrower Robert Harting.

== International competitions ==
Year	Competition	Venue	Position	Event	Notes
Representing Germany
2007	World Youth Championships	Ostrava, Czech Republic	1st	Discus	51.39, PB
2008	World Junior Championships	Bydgoszcz, Poland	2nd	Discus	54.69 m
2011	European U23 Championships	Ostrava, Czech Republic	1st	Discus	59.60, PB
2012	European Championships	Helsinki, Finland	5th	Discus	62.10
2012	Summer Olympics	London, United Kingdom	20th (q)	Discus	60.23
2013	World Championships	Moscow, Russia	13th (q)	Discus	60.09
2014	European Championships	Zürich, Switzerland	5th	Discus	62.10
2015	World Championships	Beijing, China	5th	Discus	63.88 m
2016	European Championships	Amsterdam, Netherlands	2nd	Discus	65.77 m
2016	Olympic Games	Rio de Janeiro, Brazil	9th	Discus	62.67 m
2017	World Championships	London, United Kingdom	9th	Discus	61.34 m
