= Shadae Lawrence =

Jamaican discus thrower (born 1995)

Personal information
- Born: 31 December 1995 (age 30) Saint Catherine Parish, Jamaica
- Education: Kansas State University; Colorado State University
- Height: 1.73 m (5 ft 8 in)
- Weight: 84 kg (185 lb)

Sport
- Sport: Athletics
- Event: Discus throw
- College team: KSU Wildcats
- Now coaching: University of South Florida

Shadae Lawrence (born 31 December 1995) is a Jamaican athlete specialising in the discus throw. She represented her country at the 2016 Summer Olympics without qualifying for the final. She has qualified for the event for the 2020 Summer Olympics as well.

Lawrence is from Saint Catherine Parish, Jamaica. She was an NCAA champion thrower for the Kansas State Wildcats track and field team, winning the discus throw at the 2017 NCAA Division I Outdoor Track and Field Championships. She later transferred to the Colorado State Rams track and field team, where she was 3rd in the discus at the 2019 NCAA Division I Outdoor Track and Field Championships.

On May 22, 2021, she broke the Jamaican National Record with a personal best throw of 67.05 metres set in Tucson, AZ.

Lawrence is currently an assistant coach for the South Florida Bulls track and field team.

== International competitions ==
Year	Competition	Venue	Position	Notes
Representing Jamaica
2014	Central American and Caribbean; Junior Championships (U20)	Morelia, Mexico	1st	46.25 m
2014	World Junior Championships	Eugene, United Kingdom	14th (q)	48.44 m
2016	Olympic Games	Rio de Janeiro, Brazil	22nd (q)	57.09 m
2017	World Championships	London, United Kingdom	15th (q)	59.25 m
2019	Pan American Games	Lima, Peru	7th	58.99 m
2019	World Championships	Doha, Qatar	19th (q)	58.51 m
2021	Olympic Games	Tokyo, Japan	7th	62.12 m
