= Yekaterina Strokova =

Russian discus thrower

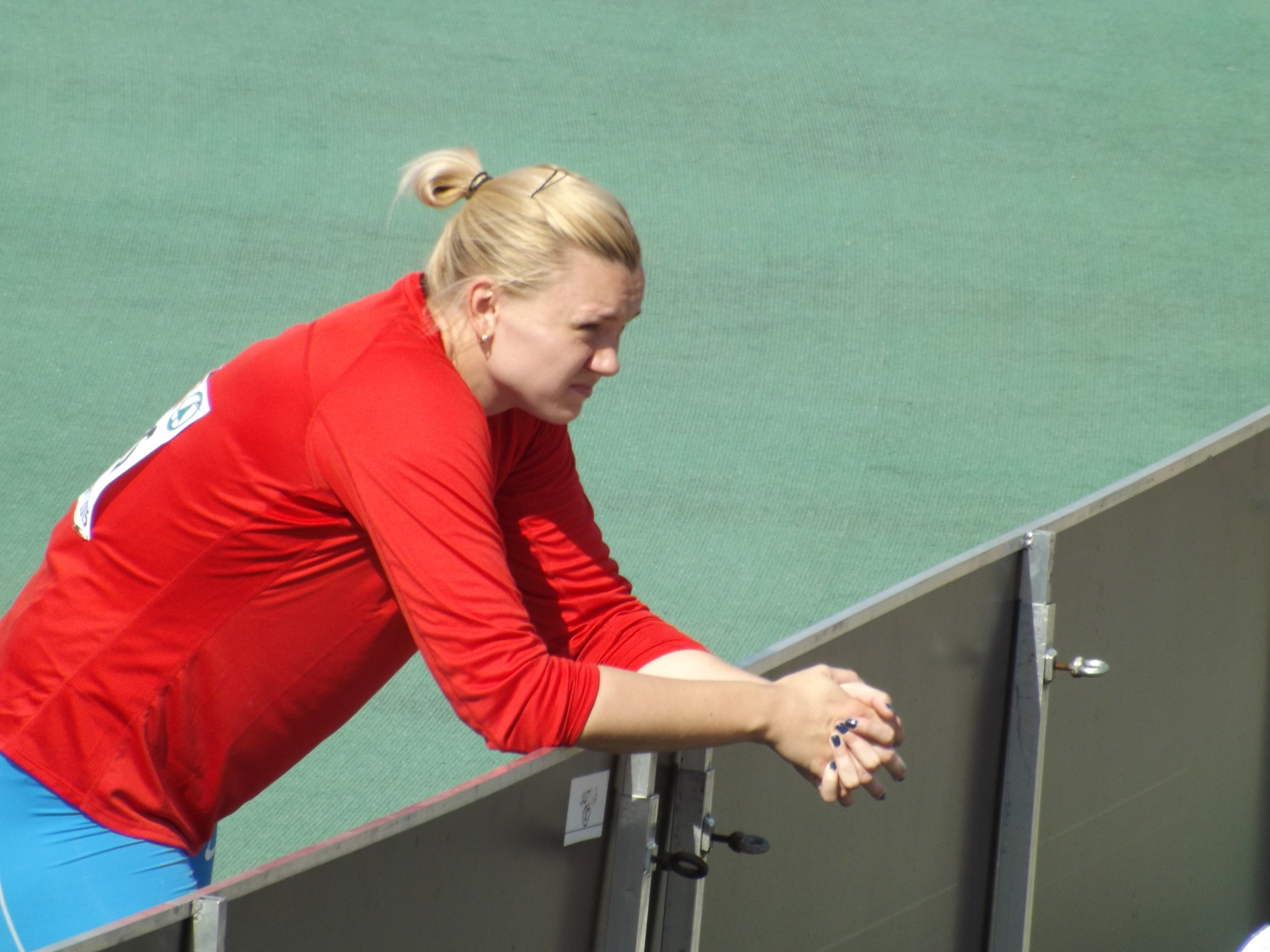
- Yekaterina Strokova at the 2015 European Team Championships

Personal information
- Born: 17 December 1989 (age 35) Lipetsk, Soviet Union

Sport
- Sport: Track and field
- Event: Discus throw
- Club: Yunost' Rossii
- Coached by: M. V. Sadov; P. I. Koptyukh; V. T. Khorovtsev

Yekaterina Nikolayevna Strokova (Cyrillic: Екатерина Николаевна Строкова; born 17 December 1989 in Lipetsk) is a Russian athlete whose specialty is the discus throw. She represented her country at two consecutive World Championships, in 2013 and 2015, failing to qualify for the final on both occasions.

Her personal best in the event is 65.78 metres set in Moscow in 2014.

== Competition record ==
Year	Competition	Venue	Position	Event	Notes
Representing Russia
2008	World Junior Championships	Bydgoszcz, Poland	16th (q)	Discus throw	48.13 m
2009	Universiade	Belgrade, Serbia	6th	Discus throw	56.65 m
2011	European U23 Championships	Ostrava, Czech Republic	10th	Discus throw	48.16 m
2013	World Championships	Moscow, Russia	16th (q)	Discus throw	57.85 m
2014	European Championships	Zürich, Switzerland	9th	Discus throw	59.13 m
2015	World Championships	Beijing, China	17th (q)	Discus throw	59.32 m
