= Tan Jian (discus thrower) =

Chinese discus thrower (born 1988)

Personal information
- Born: January 20, 1988 (age 38)
- Height: 1.78 m (5 ft 10 in)
- Weight: 80 kg (176 lb)

Sport
- Country: China
- Sport: Athletics
- Event: Discus
- Updated on 14 August 2012

Tan Jian (Chinese: 谭建; born 20 January 1988 in Chengdu) is a Chinese female discus thrower.

== Competition record ==
Year	Competition	Venue	Position	Notes
Representing China
2006	Asian Junior Championships	Macau, China	1st	55.74 m
2006	World Junior Championships	Beijing, China	3rd	56.09 m
2011	World Championships	Daegu, South Korea	6th	62.96 m
2012	Olympic Games	London, United Kingdom	–	NM
2013	World Championships	Moscow, Russia	6th	63.34 m
2014	Asian Games	Incheon, South Korea	3rd	59.03 m
2015	Asian Championships	Wuhan, China	2nd	62.97 m
2015	World Championships	Beijing, China	16th (q)	59.84 m
