= Denia Caballero =

Cuban discus thrower (born 1990)

Personal information
- Born: 13 January 1990 (age 36) Caibarién, Villa Clara, Cuba
- Height: 175 cm (5 ft 9 in)
- Weight: 70 kg (154 lb)

Sport
- Country: Cuba
- Sport: Athletics
- Event: Discus throw
Medal record
Olympic Games
Bronze medal – third place	2016 Rio de Janeiro	Discus throw
World Championships
Gold medal – first place	2015 Beijing	Discus throw
Silver medal – second place	2019 Doha	Discus throw
Pan American Games
Gold medal – first place	2015 Toronto	Discus throw
Bronze medal – third place	2011 Guadalajara	Discus throw
Bronze medal – third place	2019 Lima	Discus throw
CAC Championships
Gold medal – first place	2011 Mayagüez	Discus throw

Denia Caballero Ponce (born 13 January 1990) is a Cuban athlete who competes in the discus throw. She has a personal best of 70.65 metres for the event. She won the gold medal at the 2015 and the silver medal at the 2019 World Championships and was the bronze medalist at the 2016 Summer Olympics. Caballero also was the Central American and Caribbean champion in 2011 and the 2011 Pan American Games bronze medallist.

== Career ==
Born in Caibarién, Villa Clara Province, she took part in track and field as a teenager and at the age of eighteen she cleared fifty metres in the javelin for the first time, setting a personal best mark of 52.10 m, and became the Cuban junior champion. Her family have all been involved in sports, her father as a boxer and her mother as a long jumper. Her uncle, Ricardo Ponce, is a triple jump coach for the Cuban national team. In 2009, she had a succession of personal bests including 56.91 m for fourth at the 2009 ALBA Games and 57.21 m at a meeting in Havana.

Caballero came third at both the Barrientos Memorial and Olimpiada del Deporte Cubano in Havana in 2010 (improving her best mark to 59.30 then 59.92 m). Havana was again the venue for her first throw over sixty metres in 2011, as she had a mark of 60.50 m then won the Barrientos meet a week later with a best of 62.94 m. This earned her a spot at the 2011 World Championships in Athletics and she reached the final round, finishing ninth with a mark of 60.73 m. She had much success regionally that year, winning the gold medal at the 2011 Central American and Caribbean Championships in Athletics, as well as a bronze medal at the 2011 Pan American Games (an event won by fellow Cuban Yarelys Barrios).

A throw of 65.60 m in March 2012 lifted her to fourth in the world rankings and she was later chosen to perform in the discus alongside Barrios in 2012 Cuban Olympic squad.

At the 2013 World Championships, she finished 8th. She won the gold medal at the 2014 Central American and Caribbean Games with a new games record. The record had been set in 1982 by fellow Cuban Maria Betancourt.

In 2015, as well as setting a new personal best, she won the Pan American Games, and produced a shock upset, beating pre-competition favourite Sandra Perkovic to win the World Championship. Caballero was the first Cuban discus thrower to win the World title.

She won the bronze medal at the women's discus throw event at the 2016 Summer Olympics.

== Personal bests ==
Event	Result	Venue	Date
Discus throw	70.65 m	(Spain) Bilbao	20 June 2015
Hammer throw	64.32 m	(Cuba) La Habana	8 February 2008

== Achievements ==
Year	Competition	Venue	Position	Event	Notes
Representing Cuba
2009	ALBA Games	Havana, Cuba	4th	Discus	56.91 m
2011	Central American and Caribbean Championships	Mayagüez, Puerto Rico	1st	Discus	62.06 m
2011	World Championships	Daegu, South Korea	9th	Discus	60.73 m
2011	Pan American Games	Guadalajara, Mexico	3rd	Discus	58.63 m A
2012	Olympic Games	London, United Kingdom	27th (q)	Discus	58.78 m
2013	World Championships	Moscow, Russia	8th	Discus	62.80 m
2014	Pan American Sports Festival	Mexico City, Mexico	1st	Discus	62.19 m A
2014	Central American and Caribbean Games	Xalapa, Mexico	1st	Discus	64.47 m A
2015	Pan American Games	Toronto, Canada	1st	Discus	65.39 m
2015	World Championships	Beijing, China	1st	Discus	69.28 m
2016	Olympic Games	Rio de Janeiro, Brazil	3rd	Discus	65.34 m
2017	World Championships	London, United Kingdom	5th	Discus	64.37 m
2018	Central American and Caribbean Games	Barranquilla, Colombia	2nd	Discus	65.10 m
2019	Pan American Games	Lima, Peru	3rd	Discus	60.46 m
2019	World Championships	Doha, Qatar	2nd	Discus	68.44 m
2021	Olympic Games	Tokyo, Japan	23rd (q)	Discus	57.96 m
2022	NACAC Championships	Freeport, Bahamas	2nd	Discus	61.86 m

Sporting positions
Preceded by Sandra Perković	Women's Discus Best Year Performance; 2015	Succeeded by Sandra Perković
