= Yaime Pérez =

Cuban discus thrower (born 1991)

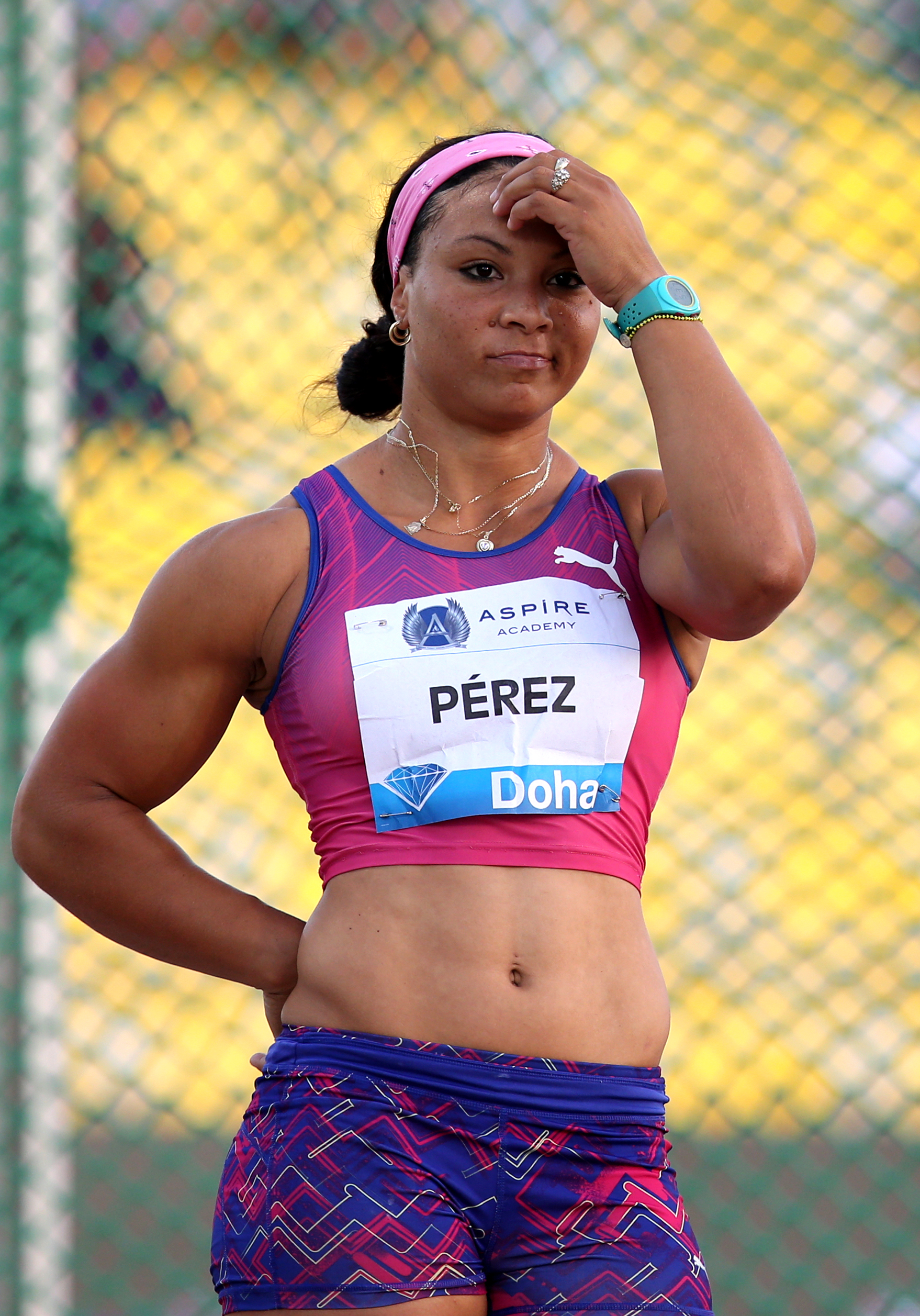
- Pérez at the 2015 Doha Diamond League

Personal information
- Full name: Yaimí Pérez Tellez
- Born: 29 May 1991 (age 35) Santiago de Cuba, Cuba
- Height: 1.72 m (5 ft 8 in)
- Weight: 86 kg (190 lb)

Sport
- Country: Cuba
- Sport: Athletics
- Event: Discus throw

Achievements and titles
- Personal best: 73.09 m (2024)
Medal record
Olympic Games
Bronze medal – third place	2020 Tokyo	Discus throw
World Championships
Gold medal – first place	2019 Doha	Discus throw
Continental Cup
Gold medal – first place	2018 Ostrava	Discus throw
Pan American Games
Gold medal – first place	2019 Lima	Discus throw
Silver medal – second place	2015 Toronto	Discus throw
- Updated on 4 October 2019

Yaime Pérez Tellez (sometimes "Yaimí", born 29 May 1991) is a Cuban athlete specialising in the discus throw. In 2022, she defected to the United States.

== Career ==
She was the gold medallist at the 2010 World Junior Championships in Athletics, then won her first senior title at the regional 2011 ALBA Games. Pérez represented Cuba at the 2013 World Championships in Athletics, placing eleventh in the final. Her 2014 season was highlighted by a silver medal at the Central American and Caribbean Games and a fifth-place finish at the 2014 IAAF Continental Cup. Pérez won her first IAAF Diamond League meeting in 2015, beating world and Olympic champion Sandra Perković through a personal best throw of 67.13 m (220 ft 2 3/4 in).

Pérez won the gold medal at the 2019 World Championships and the bronze medal at the 2020 Summer Olympics.

She defected to the United States while on a stopover in Miami, after performing at the 2022 World Athletics Championships in Eugene, Oregon where she placed seventh in the competition. Following her defection, Pérez began training under coach Dane Miller. At the Oklahoma Throws Series meeting in Ramona on 13 April 2024, Pérez achieved the world's longest women's discus throw since 1989, clocking in at 73.09m.

== Personal bests ==
- Shot put: 13.88 m (45 ft 6 1/4 in) (2008)
- Discus throw: 73.09 m (239 ft 9 1/2 in) (2024)

== International competitions ==
Year	Competition	Venue	Position	Event	Notes
Representing Cuba
2009	ALBA Games	Havana, Cuba	9th	Discus	52.00 m
2010	World Junior Championships	Moncton, Canada	1st	Discus	56.01 m
2011	ALBA Games	Barquisimeto, Venezuela	1st	Discus	55.26 m
2012	Ibero-American Championships	Barquisimeto, Venezuela	4th	Discus	56.93 m
2012	Olympic Games	London, United Kingdom	30th (q)	Discus	57.87 m
2013	World Championships	Moscow, Russia	11th	Discus	60.33 m
2014	Pan American Sports Festival	Mexico City, Mexico	—	Discus	NM
2014	Continental Cup	Marrakesh, Morocco	5th	Discus	59.38 m^{1}
2014	Central American and Caribbean Games	Xalapa, Mexico	2nd	Discus	62.42 m A
2015	Pan American Games	Toronto, Canada	2nd	Discus	64.99 m
2015	World Championships	Beijing, China	4th	Discus	65.46 m
2016	Olympic Games	Rio de Janeiro, Brazil	1st (q)	Discus	65.38 m^{2}
2017	World Championships	London, United Kingdom	4th	Discus	64.82 m
2018	Central American and Caribbean Games	Barranquilla, Colombia	1st	Discus	66.00 m
2018	NACAC Championships	Toronto, Canada	1st	Discus	61.97 m
2019	Pan American Games	Lima, Peru	1st	Discus	66.58 m
2019	World Championships	Doha, Qatar	1st	Discus	69.17 m
2021	Olympic Games	Tokyo, Japan	3rd	Discus	65.72 m
2022	Ibero-American Championships	La Nucía, Spain	1st	Discus	62.06 m
2022	World Championships	Eugene, United States	7th	Discus	63.07 m

^{1}Representing the Americas

^{2}No mark in the final

Olympic Games
Preceded by Mijaín López	Flagbearer for Cuba (with Mijaín López); Tokyo 2020	Succeeded by Julio César La Cruz; Idalys Ortiz
