= Andressa de Morais =

Brazilian discus thrower (born 1990)

Personal information
- Full name: Andressa Oliveira de Morais
- Born: December 21, 1990 (age 35) João Pessoa, Paraíba, Brazil
- Height: 1.78 m (5 ft 10 in)
- Weight: 100 kg (220 lb)

Sport
- Country: Brazil
- Sport: Athletics
- Event: Discus
Medal record
Women's athletics
Representing Brazil
Pan American Games
Silver medal – second place	2023 Santiago	Discus throw
Disqualified	2019 Lima	Discus throw
Military World Games
Silver medal – second place	2015 Mungyeong	Discus throw
South American Games
Gold medal – first place	2018 Cochabamba	Discus throw
Gold medal – first place	2026 Santa Fe	Discus throw
- Updated on 7 October 2015

Andressa Oliveira de Morais (born December 21, 1990) is a Brazilian athlete specializing in the discus throw. With a throw of 64.21 meters she achieved at the 2012 Ibero-American Championships she became the South American record holder.

In 2019, at Leiria, Portugal, she broke the South American record in Discus Throw, with a mark of 65.34.

At the 2019 Pan American Games, she won the silver medal in Discus Throw, breaking the South American record, with a mark of 65.98. It was reported she tested positive at the Games, and was later provisionally suspended.

She competed at the 2020 Summer Olympics.

== International competitions ==
Representing Brazil
Year	Competition	Venue	Position	Event	Result	Notes
2008	Ibero-American Championships	Iquique, Chile	5th	Discus throw	50.39 m	
2008	World Junior Championships	Bydgoszcz, Poland	20th (q)	Discus throw	47.44 m	
2008	South American U23 Championships	Lima, Peru	2nd	Discus throw	51.24 m	
2009	South American Championships	Lima, Peru	5th	Discus throw	51.36 m	
2009	South American Championships	Lima, Peru	6th	Hammer throw	58.12 m	
2009	South American Junior Championships	São Paulo, Brazil	1st	Discus throw	55.27 m	
2009	South American Junior Championships	São Paulo, Brazil	1st	Hammer throw	55.26 m	
2009	Pan American Junior Championships	Port of Spain, Trinidad and Tobago	1st	Discus throw	55.28 m	
2009	Pan American Junior Championships	Port of Spain, Trinidad and Tobago	2nd	Hammer throw	55.01 m	
2010	South American U23 Championships	Medellín, Colombia	2nd	Discus throw	53.28 m	
2010	South American U23 Championships	Medellín, Colombia	1st	Hammer throw	55.95 m	
2010	Ibero-American Championships	San Fernando, Spain	5th	Discus throw	54.20 m	
2011	South American Championships	Buenos Aires, Argentina	1st	Discus throw	57.54 m	
2011	World Championships	Daegu, South Korea	18th (q)	Discus throw	57.93 m	
2012	Ibero-American Championships	Barquisimeto, Venezuela	1st	Discus throw	64.21 m	AR
2012	Olympic Games	London, United Kingdom	16th (q)	Discus throw	60.94 m	
2012	South American U23 Championships	São Paulo, Brazil	1st	Discus throw	57.66 m	
2013	South American Championships	Lima, Peru	5th	Discus throw	53.66 m	
2014	South American Games	Santiago, Chile	4th	Discus throw	52.62 m	
2014	Ibero-American Championships	São Paulo, Brazil	3rd	Discus throw	57.82 m	
2015	South American Championships	Lima, Peru	1st	Discus throw	61.15 m	
2015	Pan American Games	Toronto, Canada	6th	Discus throw	58.08 m	
2015	World Championships	Beijing, China	19th (q)	Discus throw	59.08 m	
2015	Military World Games	Mungyeong, South Korea	2nd	Discus throw	59.07 m	
2016	Ibero-American Championships	Rio de Janeiro, Brazil	4th	Discus throw	55.28 m	
2016	Olympic Games	Rio de Janeiro, Brazil	21st (q)	Discus throw	57.38 m	
2017	South American Championships	Asunción, Paraguay	1st	Discus throw	64.68 m	
2017	World Championships	London, United Kingdom	11th	Discus throw	60.00 m	
2018	South American Games	Cochabamba, Bolivia	1st	Discus throw	58.86 m	
2018	Ibero-American Championships	Trujillo, Peru	1st	Discus throw	62.02 m	
2019	South American Championships	Lima, Peru	1st	Discus throw	62.42 m	
2019	Pan American Games	Lima, Peru	DSQ	Discus throw	~~65.98 m~~	Doping
2021	Olympic Games	Tokyo, Japan	20th (q)	Discus throw	58.90 m	
2022	Ibero-American Championships	La Nucía, Spain	3rd	Discus throw	58.33 m	
2022	World Championships	Eugene, United States	20th (q)	Discus throw	58.11 m	
2022	South American Games	Asunción, Paraguay	2nd	Discus throw	60.10 m	
2023	South American Championships	São Paulo, Brazil	3rd	Discus throw	59.92 m	
2023	World Championships	Budapest, Hungary	17th (q)	Discus throw	59.15 m	
2023	Pan American Games	Santiago, Chile	2nd	Discus throw	59.29 m	
2024	Ibero-American Championships	Cuiabá, Brazil	2nd	Discus throw	60.37 m	
2024	Olympic Games	Paris, France	26th (q)	Discus throw	59.43 m	
2025	South American Championships	Mar del Plata, Argentina	2nd	Discus throw	60.16 m	
2025	World Championships	Tokyo, Japan	37th (q)	Discus throw	52.99 m	
2026	Ibero-American Championships	Lima, Peru	1st	Discus throw	59.68 m	
2026	Pan American Championships	Medellín, Colombia	1st	Discus throw	58.87 m	
2026	South American Games	Santa Fe, Argentina	1st	Discus throw	59.36 m	

== Personal bests ==
- Discus Throw – 65.34 (Leiria 2019)
- Hammer Throw – 58.89 (São Paulo 2012)
