= SPIKES (magazine) =

British sports magazine

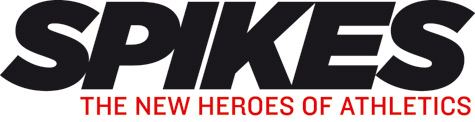
- Editor: Michelle Sammet
- Art Director: Tim Scott
- Categories: Athletics
- Publisher: Haymarket Network
- Founded: 2008
- First issue: July 2008
- Country: UK
- Based in: London
- Language: English
- Website: SPIKES
- ISSN: 1758-0390

SPIKES is an athletics website and magazine published by Haymarket Network in conjunction with the IAAF.

== History and profile ==
The magazine and website were launched in July 2008 at an event attended by then IAAF vice president Lord Coe, Steve Ovett, Jonathan Edwards, Colin Jackson and Wilson Kipketer.

The aim of SPIKES is to raise awareness of the sport and recognition of the athletes by encouraging discussion through challenging features and profiles. Although funded directly by the IAAF, the editorial staff has a free rein with the content – which typically combines serious debate with more light-hearted features and pop cultural references. Giles Richards of The Observer praised the magazine for its interviews and biographical features: "It's a lot easier to care about a sport if you care about the people involved".

In 2014, SPIKES moved to a primarily-digital format on the IAAF website.
