= Chrysoula Anagnostopoulou =

Greek discus thrower (born 1991)

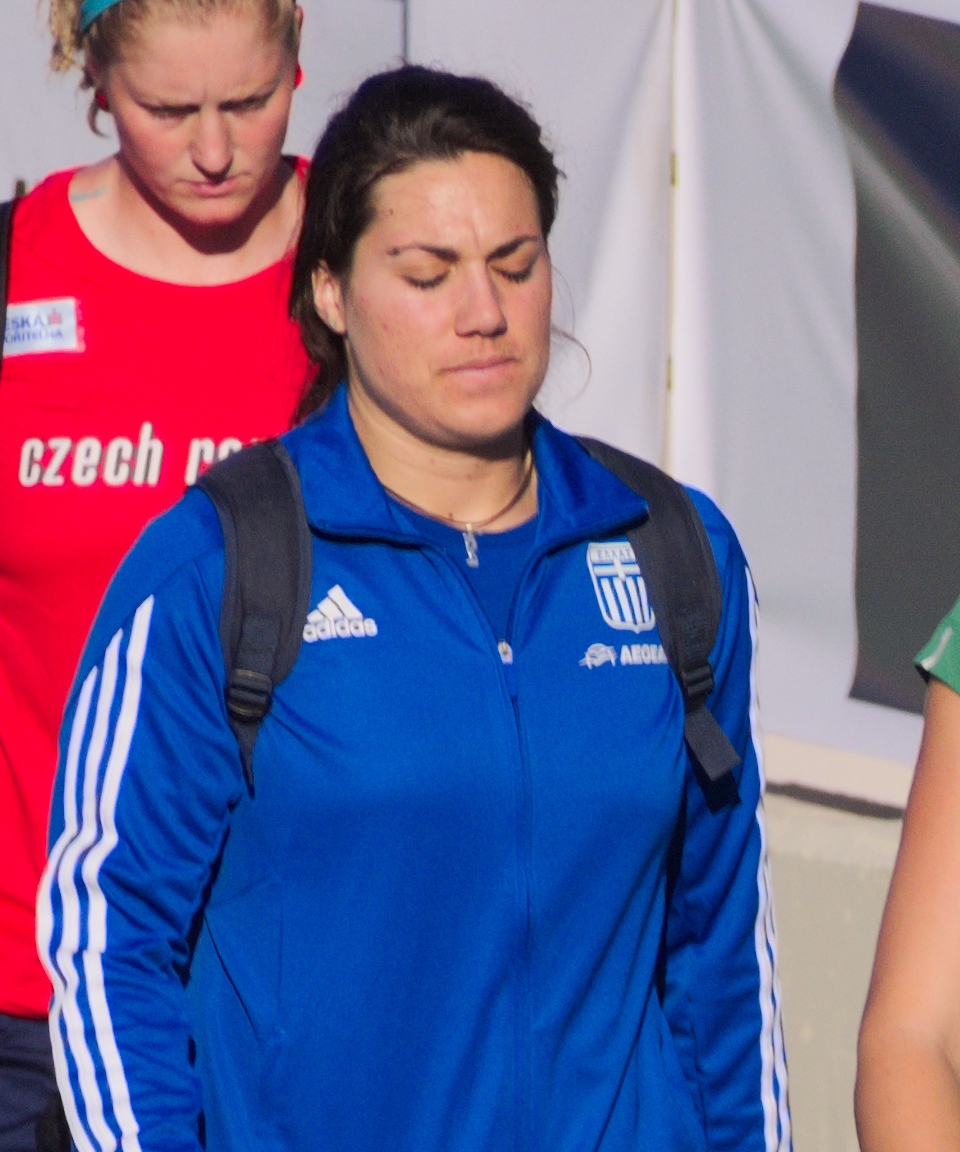
- Chrysoula Anagnostopoulou at 2015 European Team Championships First League.

Personal information
- Born: 27 August 1991 (age 35) Larissa, Greece
- Height: 175 cm (5 ft 9 in)
- Weight: 85 kg (187 lb)

Sport
- Sport: Track and field
- Event: Discus throw

Achievements and titles
- Personal best: 62.40 m (2022)
Medal record
Mediterranean Games
Bronze medal – third place	2013 Mersin	Discus throw
Bronze medal – third place	2018 Tarragona	Discus throw

Chrysoula Anagnostopoúlou (Greek: Χρυσούλα Αναγνωστοπούλου, born 27 August 1991 in Larissa) is a Greek discus thrower. She competed at the 2015 World Championships in Beijing without qualifying for the final.

Her personal best in the event is 62.40 meters set in Irakleio on 4 June 2022.

== Competition record ==
Year	Competition	Venue	Position	Notes
Representing Greece
2007	World Youth Championships	Ostrava, Czech Republic	10th	42.24 m
2009	European Junior Championships	Novi Sad, Serbia	9th	45.95 m
2010	World Junior Championships	Moncton, Canada	17th (q)	47.66 m
2011	European U23 Championships	Ostrava, Czech Republic	4th	53.43 m
2013	Mediterranean Games	Mersin, Turkey	3rd	55.01 m
2013	European U23 Championships	Tampere, Finland	5th	55.05 m
2014	European Championships	Zurich, Switzerland	18th (q)	51.08 m
2015	World Championships	Beijing, China	23rd (q)	58.20 m
2016	European Championships	Amsterdam, Netherlands	9th	59.23 m
2016	Olympic Games	Rio de Janeiro, Brazil	26th (q)	54.84 m
2017	World Championships	London, United Kingdom	22nd (q)	56.91 m
2018	Mediterranean Games	Tarragona, Spain	3rd	58.85 m
2018	European Championships	Berlin, Germany	10th	57.34 m
2019	World Championships	Doha, Qatar	15th (q)	59.91 m SB
2019	Military World Games	Wuhan, China	3rd	58.27 m
2021	Olympic Games	Tokyo, Japan	19th (q)	59.18 m
2022	World Championships	Eugene, United States	19th (q)	58.15 m
2022	European Championships	Munich, Germany	12th	56.10 m
2026	European Championships	Birmingham, United Kingdom	21st (q)	55.13 m
2026	Mediterranean Games	Taranto, Italy	6th	56.59 m
