= 2015 World Championships in Athletics – Women's discus throw =

Women's discus throw at the 2015 World Championships
- Venue: Beijing National Stadium
- Dates: 24 August (qualification); 25 August (final)
- Competitors: 31 from 20 nations
- Winning distance: 69.28

Medalists
gold medal	Denia Caballero	Cuba
silver medal	Sandra Perković	Croatia
bronze medal	Nadine Müller	Germany

The women's discus throw at the 2015 World Championships in Athletics was held at the Beijing National Stadium on 24 and 25 August.

In 2015, Denia Caballero found five extra metres in her throws to become the number one ranked thrower. She had no intention of making a dramatic competition. On her first throw, the sixth throw of qualifying she launched the best throw of the preliminary round. Then in the finals, on her first effort only four throws into the competition she threw 69.28. Only one other girl in Beijing had ever thrown a discus that far, she was the defending champion Sandra Perković. So it was up to the rest of the field to do something spectacular or settle for other medals. Three throws later Nadine Müller threw 65.53 to take over second place. After fouling her first attempt, Perković threw 65.35 to move into third place. Gia Lewis-Smallwood was the only other athlete to reach the low 69's was not having a 69 kind of day, instead muddled at the back of the field. On her final throw Perković threw 67.39 to finally move into silver medal position. Yaime Pérez tried to make it interesting but her 65.46 final attempt missed a medal.

== Records ==
Prior to the competition, the records were as follows:

World record	Gabriele Reinsch (GDR)	76.80	Neubrandenburg, East Germany	7 July 1988
Championship record	Martina Hellmann (GDR)	71.62	Rome, Italy	31 August 1987
World leading	Denia Caballero (CUB)	70.65	Bilbao, Spain	20 June 2015
African record	Elizna Naudé (RSA)	64.87	Stellenbosch, South Africa	2 March 2003
Asian record	Xiao Yanling (CHN)	71.68	Beijing, China	14 March 1992
North, Central American and Caribbean record	Hilda Ramos (CUB)	70.88	Havana, Cuba	8 May 1992
South American record	Andressa de Morais (BRA)	64.21	Barquisimeto, Venezuela	10 June 2012
European record	Gabriele Reinsch (GDR)	76.80	Neubrandenburg, East Germany	7 July 1988
Oceanian record	Daniela Costian (AUS)	68.72	Auckland, New Zealand	22 January 1994

== Qualification standards ==
Entry standards
61.00

== Schedule ==
Date	Time	Round
24 August 2015	09:35	Qualification
25 August 2015	19:00	Final

All times are local times (UTC+8)

== Results ==
KEY:	Q	Qualified	q	12 best performers	NR	National record	PB	Personal best	SB	Seasonal best

=== Qualification ===
Qualification: 63.00 m (Q) or at least 12 best performers (q).

Rank	Group	Name	Nationality	#1	#2	#3	Mark	Notes7
1	A	Denia Caballero	Cuba	65.15			65.15	Q
2	B	Sandra Perković	Croatia	58.95	64.51		64.51	Q
3	B	Nadine Müller	Germany	64.39			64.39	Q
4	A	Julia Fischer	Germany	63.38			63.38	Q
5	B	Yaime Pérez	Cuba	x	61.79	62.93	62.93	q
6	A	Shanice Craft	Germany	62.73	x	x	62.73	q
7	B	Gia Lewis-Smallwood	United States	62.04	60.28	–	62.04	q
8	A	Dani Samuels	Australia	x	61.87	62.01	62.01	q
9	B	Mélina Robert-Michon	France	60.23	57.93	61.78	61.78	q
10	A	Su Xinyue	China	61.04	60.70	61.68	61.68	q
11	A	Whitney Ashley	United States	60.88	x	60.18	60.88	q
12	B	Natalia Semenova	Ukraine	59.96	60.72	57.74	60.72	q
13	A	Zinaida Sendriūtė	Lithuania	60.33	x	55.22	60.33	
14	B	Shelbi Vaughan	United States	60.24	x	57.38	60.24	
15	A	Yelena Panova	Russia	60.21	57.52	55.69	60.21	
16	B	Tan Jian	China	59.84	x	x	59.84	
17	B	Yekaterina Strokova	Russia	x	x	59.32	59.32	
18	A	Te Rina Keenan	New Zealand	57.11	59.20	58.79	59.20	
19	A	Andressa de Morais	Brazil	55.85	x	59.08	59.08	
20	B	Dragana Tomašević	Serbia	56.70	57.48	58.98	58.98	
21	A	Lu Xiaoxin	China	x	58.12	58.55	58.55	
22	B	Karen Gallardo	Chile	55.96	58.32	55.50	58.32	
23	B	Chrysoula Anagnostopoulou	Greece	55.23	58.20	x	58.20	
24	A	Sabina Asenjo	Spain	57.56	x	58.04	58.04	
25	A	Yuliya Maltseva	Russia	57.08	57.03	x	57.08	
26	B	Fernanda Martins	Brazil	56.74	x	56.26	56.74	
27	A	Sanna Kämäräinen	Finland	56.68	53.19	x	56.68	
28	A	Rocío Comba	Argentina	x	56.11	x	56.11	
29	B	Subenrat Insaeng	Thailand	50.20	55.14	x	55.14	
30	B	Siositina Hakeai	New Zealand	54.89	x	x	54.89	
31	B	Irina Rodrigues	Portugal	x	48.10	52.82	52.82	

=== Final ===
The final was started at 19:00.

Rank	Name	Nationality	# 1	# 2	# 3	# 4	# 5	# 6	Mark	Notes
1st place, gold medalist(s)	Denia Caballero	Cuba	69.28	63.83	x	65.97	66.55	66.58	69.28	
2nd place, silver medalist(s)	Sandra Perković	Croatia	x	65.35	x	65.37	x	67.39	67.39	
3rd place, bronze medalist(s)	Nadine Müller	Germany	65.53	x	60.85	x	x	62.67	65.53	
4	Yaime Pérez	Cuba	x	62.63	59.63	64.60	64.31	65.46	65.46	
5	Julia Fischer	Germany	63.88	x	x	59.22	x	63.19	63.88	
6	Dani Samuels	Australia	53.65	62.90	63.08	63.14	61.48	62.31	63.14	
7	Shanice Craft	Germany	61.80	61.72	61.46	59.23	63.10	62.86	63.10	
8	Su Xinyue	China	62.90	62.58	58.47	61.56	62.33	62.61	62.90	
9	Whitney Ashley	United States	x	56.91	61.05				61.05	
10	Mélina Robert-Michon	France	59.25	60.92	59.89				60.92	
11	Gia Lewis-Smallwood	United States	x	60.55	59.02				60.55	
12	Natalia Semenova	Ukraine	57.94	59.54	54.97				59.54	
