= Athletics at the 2015 Pan American Games – Women's discus throw =

Women's discus throw at the 2015 Pan American Games
- Venue: CIBC Pan Am and Parapan Am Athletics Stadium
- Dates: July 24
- Competitors: 11 from 7 nations
- Winning distance: 65.39

Medalists
Gold medal	Denia Caballero	Cuba
Silver medal	Yaime Pérez	Cuba
Bronze medal	Gia Lewis-Smallwood	United States

The women's discus throw competition of the athletics events at the 2015 Pan American Games took place on July 24 at the CIBC Pan Am and Parapan Am Athletics Stadium. The defending Pan American Games champion is Yarelys Barrios of Cuba.

== Records ==
Prior to this competition, the existing world and Pan American Games records were as follows:

World record	Gabriele Reinsch (GER)	76.80	Neubrandenburg, East Germany	July 9, 1988
Pan American Games record	Yarelys Barrios (CUB)	66.40	Guadalajara, Mexico	October 28, 2011

== Qualification ==
Each National Olympic Committee (NOC) was able to enter up to two entrants providing they had met the minimum standard (50.94) in the qualifying period (January 1, 2014 to June 28, 2015).

== Schedule ==
Date	Time	Round
July 24, 2015	10:05	Final

== Results ==
All results shown are in meters.

KEY:	q	Best non-qualifiers	Q	Qualified	NR	National record	PB	Personal best	SB	Seasonal best	DQ	Disqualified

=== Final ===
Rank	Athlete	Nationality	#1	#2	#3	#4	#5	#6	Result	Notes
1st place, gold medalist(s)	Denia Caballero	Cuba	x	62.71	65.39	x	x	x	65.39	
2nd place, silver medalist(s)	Yaime Pérez	Cuba	58.74	62.05	64.99	60.33	x	64.23	64.99	
3rd place, bronze medalist(s)	Gia Lewis-Smallwood	United States	x	60.17	x	61.26	60.48	x	61.26	
4	Fernanda Martins	Brazil	59.46	x	x	60.50	59.45	58.38	60.50	
5	Karen Gallardo	Chile	58.31	x	57.32	x	56.02	59.11	59.11	SB
6	Andressa de Morais	Brazil	58.08	x	56.66	x	57.75	56.21	58.08	
7	Kelsey Card	United States	55.71	57.00	54.14	56.66	x	56.18	57.00	
8	Rocío Comba	Argentina	50.95	55.63	x	x	55.80	x	55.80	
9	Aixa Middleton	Panama	x	50.62	x				50.62	
10	Alanna Kovacs	Canada	49.08	x	x				49.08	SB
11	Marie-Josée Le Jour	Canada	44.67	x	43.74				43.74	
