= Tamara Apostolico =

Italian discus thrower

Personal information
- National team: Italy: 1 cap
- Born: 28 April 1989 (age 37) Trieste, Italy
- Height: 1.78 m (5 ft 10 in)
- Weight: 77 kg (170 lb)

Sport
- Sport: Athletics
- Event: Discus throw
- Club: Camelot
- Coached by: Adrian Annus
- Retired: 2013

Achievements and titles
- Personal best: Discus throw: 59.50 m (2012)
Medal record
European U20 Championships
Bronze medal – third place	2007 Hengelo	Discus throw

Tamara Apostolico (born 28 April 1989) is a former Italian discus thrower who was finalist at the 2012 European Championships

Her personal bests, 59.50 m set in 2012, at the end of the 2020 outdoor season is the 5th best all-time performance of the Italian lists and in that year it was also the 62nd best result in the world top-lists.

== Achievements ==
Senior

Year	Competition	Venue	Rank	Event	Measure	Notes
2012	European Championships	(Finland) Helsinki	12th	Discus throw	56.15 m	

== National titles ==
Apostolico won a national championship at individual senior level.

- Italian Athletics Championships
  - Discus throw: 2012

== See also ==
- Italian all-time top lists - Discus throw
