= 2012 Lithuanian Athletics Championships =

- Edition: 89th
- Dates: 7–8 July
- Host city: Kaunas, Lithuania
- Level: Senior
- Type: Outdoor

The 89th 2012 Lithuanian Athletics Championships were held in S. Darius and S. Girėnas Stadium, Kaunas on 7–8 July 2012. For the first time Lithuanian Championships was open and athletes from Latvia, Russia and Azerbaijan also participated.

10,000 m, race walking, decathlon/heptathlon and marathon championships was held in different tournaments.

== Men ==
=== Track events ===
Event	Gold		Silver		Bronze	
100 m	Mantas Šilkauskas	10.53	Žilvinas Adomavičius	10.68	Aivaras Pranckevičius	10.85
200 m	Žilvinas Adomavičius	21.84	Mantas Norvilas	22.17	Gediminas Kučinskas	22.24
400 m	Gediminas Kučinskas	48.79	Linas Bružas	48.94	Raimondas Turla	49.53
800 m	Vitalij Kozlov	1:50.07	Petras Gliebus	1:52.98	Juozas Gliebus	1:53.23
1500 m	Petras Gliebus	3:51.61	Juozas Gliebus	3:52.46	Valentinas Rudys	3:52.98
5000 m	Martynas Stanys	14:48.21	Mindaugas Viršilas	15:01.18	Remigijus Kančys	15:34.02
110 m hurdles	Andrius Latvinskas	14.53	Artūras Janauskas	14.91	Tomas Malakauskas	15.08
400 m hurdles	Silvestras Guogis	50.76	Artūras Janauskas	54.83	Rimvydas Smilgys	54.94
3000 m Steeplechase	Andrius Juknevičius	9:24.93	Andrej Jegorov	9:29.15	Valdas Dopolskas	9:35.62
4x100 m relay	Kaunas	41.88	Vilnius	42.27	Alytus	44.34
4x400 m relay	Vilnius-Šiauliai	3:17.38	Vilnius	3:18.54	Vilnius	3:31.37
WR world record | AR area record | CR championship record | GR games record | NR national record | OR Olympic record | PB personal best | SB season best | WL world leading (in a given season)

=== Field events ===
Event	Gold		Silver		Bronze	
High jump	Seiranas Puščius	2.08	Ernestas Raudys	2.08	Mantvydas Ambraziejus	2.04
Pole vault	Irmantas Lianzbergas	4.50	Ernestas Vėsa	4.40	Arnoldas Stanelis	4.30
Long jump	Povilas Mykolaitis	7.85	Tomas Vitonis	7.75	Marius Vadeikis	7.72
Triple Jump	Darius Aučyna	16.84	Andrius Gricevičius	15.69	Mantas Dilys	15.58
Shot put	Rimantas Martišauskas	18.44	Šarūnas Banevičius	17.67	Vytautas Ugianskis	17.26
Discus throw	Virgilijus Alekna	67.93	Andrius Gudžius	57.40	Aleksas Abromavičius	56.15
Hammer throw	Tomas Juknevičius	64.19	Andrius Stankevičius	52.88	Donatas Lingevičius	49.61
Javelin throw	Nerijus Lučkauskas	65.92	Tomas Kirielius	65.03	Aivaras Nekrošas	62.43
WR world record | AR area record | CR championship record | GR games record | NR national record | OR Olympic record | PB personal best | SB season best | WL world leading (in a given season)

== Women ==
=== Track events ===
Event	Gold		Silver		Bronze	
100 m	Lina Grinčikaitė	11.77	Živilė Brokoriūtė	12.17	Silva Pesackaitė	12.22
200 m	Agnė Šerkšnienė	23.63	Eva Misiūnaitė	24.13	Silvestra Malinauskaitė	24.68
400 m	Agnė Šerkšnienė	52.56	Eva Misiūnaitė	53.93	Emilija Rudytė	57.82
800 m	Eglė Balčiūnaitė	2:04.97	Loreta Kančytė	2:14.31	Rita Balčiauskaitė	2:15.31
1500 m	Loreta Kančytė	4:41.80	Guoda Sadauskaitė	4:50.56	Aušra Jurgauskaitė	4:52.81
5000 m	Vaida Žūsinaitė	16:25.72	Milda Vilčinskaitė	17:36.98	Gytė Norgilienė	17:55.37
100 m hurdles	Austra Skujytė	14.12	Irma Mačiukaitė	14.57	Justina Abariūtė	14.67
400 m hurdles	Eglė Staišiūnaitė	57.39	Irma Mačiukaitė	1:01.24	Agnė Abramavičiūtė	1:02.62
3000 m steeplechase	Karina Onufrijeva	11:58.26	Monika Petrauskaitė	12:19.66		
4x100 m Relay	Vilnius	47.38	Kaunas	48.38		
4x400 m Relay	Vilnius	3:53.58	Tauragė	4:01.52	Vilnius-Alytus	4:06.17
WR world record | AR area record | CR championship record | GR games record | NR national record | OR Olympic record | PB personal best | SB season best | WL world leading (in a given season)

=== Field events ===
Event	Gold		Silver		Bronze	
High jump	Airinė Palšytė	1.95	Ineta Šeflerytė; Karina Vnukova	1.70		
Pole Vault	Rolanda Demčenko	3.91 (NR)	Vitalija Dejeva	2.80	Almina Mickutė	2.40
Long jump	Austra Skujytė	6.43	Lina Andrijauskaitė	6.24	Aistė Menčinskaitė	5.95
Triple Jump	Jolanta Verseckaitė	13.52	Jana Nosova	13.13	Asta Daukšaitė	12.74
Shot put	Laura Gedminaitė	13.53	Larisa Voroneckaja	13.50	Greta Raznauskaitė	12.93
Discus throw	Zinaida Sendriūtė	61.56	Sabina Banytė	47.60	Larisa Voroneckaja	45.20
Hammer throw	Sandra Mišeikytė	46.00	Jūratė Domeikaitė	40.79	Justina Juškevičiūtė	39.91
Javelin throw	Indrė Jakubaitytė	53.37	Simona Dobilaitė	48.88	Giedrė Kupstytė	46.98
WR world record | AR area record | CR championship record | GR games record | NR national record | OR Olympic record | PB personal best | SB season best | WL world leading (in a given season)

== Missing season leaders ==
- Rytis Sakalauskas (100 m, 200 m)
- Martynas Jurgilas (100 m)
- Natalija Piliušina (1500 m, 800 m)
- Raivydas Stanys (high jump)
- Vaida Žūsinaitė (3000 m steeplechase (participated in 5000 m))
- Austra Skujytė (shot put, high jump (participated in long jump, 100 m hurdles, 200 m)
- Darius Draudvila (pole vault)
- Mantas Šilkauskas (110 m hurdles (participated in 100 m)
- Sonata Tamošaitytė (100 m hurdles)
- Dovilė Dzindzaletaitė (triple jump)

== Foreign medalists ==
- (Latvia) Līna Mūze (javelin throw) - Gold
- (Latvia) Mareks Ārents (pole vault) - Gold
- (Azerbaijan) Rahib Mammadov (110 m hurdles) - Gold
- (Russia) Tatyana Shushina (100 m) - Silver
- (Russia) Andrej Polianovskij (400 m) - Bronze
- (Russia) Andrej Polianovskij, Andrej Pilin, Dmitrij Podlipailo, Maksim Tkačenko (4x400 m) - Bronze
