= 2006 Lithuanian Athletics Championships =

- Edition: 83rd
- Dates: 21–22 July
- Host city: Kaunas, Lithuania
- Level: Senior
- Type: Outdoor

The 83rd 2006 Lithuanian Athletics Championships were held in S. Darius and S. Girėnas Stadium, Kaunas on 21–22 July 2006.

== Men ==
	Gold		Silver		Bronze	
100 m	Rytis Sakalauskas	10,80	Andrius Kačėnas	10,85	Dainius Šerpytis	10,96
200 m	Rytis Sakalauskas	21,86	Žilvinas Adomavičius	21,96	Egidijus Dilys	21,99
400 m	Vitalij Kozlov	48,51	Audrius Šimkevičius	48,76	Rimvydas Smilgys	49,16
800 m	Vitalij Kozlov	1:50.50	Egidijus Švėgžda	1:52.25	Darius Bagaslauskas	1:52.61
1500 m	Vitalij Gorlukovič	3:56.46	Andrej Jegorov	3:56.89	Regimantas Tarasevičius	3:58.63
5000 m	Dainius Šaučikovas	15:27.41	Nerijus Markauskas	15:36.75	Mindaugas Viršilas	15:38.59
10 000 m	Dainius Šaučikovas	31:21.58	Nerijus Markauskas	32:12.92	Aurimas Skinulis	32:26.71
110 m hurdles	Giedrius Mačėnas	14,52	Rolandas Stanionis	15,08	Donatas Verkys	15,17
400 m hurdles	Artūras Kulnis	52.38	Rimvydas Smilgys	53.91	Aivaras Aksionovas	54.53
3000 m st.	Aurimas Gudaitis	9:22.63	Andrej Jegorov	9:23.96	Justinas Križinauskas	9:29.43
4 × 100 m	Kaunas	41,56	Kaunas	41,97	Šiauliai	42,16
4 × 400 m	Klaipėda	3:20.11	„Atletas“	3:20.20	Vilkaviškis/Marijampolė	3:26.42
High jump	Nerijus Bužas	2,13	Rimantas Mėlinis	2,05	Tomas Turskis	2,05
Pole vault	Saulius Birmanas	4,20	Darius Draudvila	4,20	Svajūnas Kurnickas	4,00
Long jump	Vytautas Seliukas	7,66	Darius Draudvila	7,49	Justinas Grainys	7,21
Triple jump	Mantas Dilys	16,11	Andrius Gricevičius	15,78	Arvydas Nazarovas	15,64
Shot put	Paulius Luožys	17,22	Aleksas Abromavičius	16,34	Rimantas Martišauskas	16,00
Discus throw	Aleksas Abromavičius	52,85	Giedrius Šakinis	52,52	Egidijus Petrauskas	51,61
hammer throw	Žydrūnas Vasiliauskas	57,69	Andrius Stankevičius	53,68	Ignas Germanavičius	50,25
Javelin throw	Tomas Intas	72,09	Aidas Aleksonis	63,94	Tomas Paulavičius	60,78

== Women ==
	Gold		Silver		Bronze	
100 m	Lina Grinčikaitė	11,70	Audra Dagelytė	11,85	Edita Lingytė	12,29
200 m	Lina Grinčikaitė	23,70	Audra Dagelytė	23,98	Jūratė Kudirkaitė	24,92
400 m	Jūratė Kudirkaitė	54,93	Jekaterina Šakovič	54,93	Aina Valatkevičiūtė	55,73
800 m	Irina Krakoviak	2:03.12	Rasa Drazdauskaitė	2:06.26	Eglė Balčiūnaitė	2:07.01
1500 m	Rasa Drazdauskaitė	4:26.92	Olga Kondratjeva	4:33.34	Eglė Krištaponytė	4:38.00
5000 m	Vaida Žūsinaitė	17:31.46	Remalda Kergytė	17:45.54	Gintarė Kubiliūtė	19:32.52
10 000 m	Remalda Kergytė	37:16.48	Justina Jasutytė	38:33.86	Justina Jackutė	41:41.01
100 m hurdles	Sonata Tamošaitytė	14,10	Aistė Menčinskaitė	15,24	Laura Ušanovaitė	15,55
400 m hurdles	Natalija Piliušina	1:01.83	Miglė Meškauskaitė	1:04.79	Toma Žilytė	1:05.84
3000 m st.	Vaida Žūsinaitė	11:22.35	Aurelija Ručinskaitė	11:56.49		
4 × 100 m	Kaunas	46.04	Klaipėda	48.70	Vilnius	49.16
4 × 400 m	Kaunas	3:49.64	Panevėžys	3:57.80	Šiauliai	3:59.61
High jump	Viktorija Žemaitytė	1,79	Karina Vnukova	1,79	Indrė Sabaliauskaitė	1,73
Pole vault	Kristina Sabalytė	3,20	Rita Sadzevičienė	3,10	Vitalija Dejeva	3,00
Long jump	Dovilė Tanskytė	5,93	Viktorija Žemaitytė	5,89	Živilė Šikšnelytė	5,77
Triple jump	Živilė Pukštienė	12,89	Jolanta Verseckaitė	12,65	Karina Vnukova	12,54
Shot put	Alina Vaišvilaitė	15,82	Ugnė Bujūtė	13,44	Larisa Voroneckaja	12,23
Dicus throw	Zinaida Sendriūtė	52,44	Sabina Banytė	46,28	Giedrė Aleknaitė	45,86
Hammer throw	Vaida Kelečiūtė	49,98	Natalija Venckutė	47,00	Živilė Ščevinskaitė	44,57
Javelin throw	Rita Ramanauskaitė	56,05	Indrė Jakubaitytė	54,64	Viktorija Barvičiūtė	43,12
