= 2011 Lithuanian Athletics Championships =

- Edition: 88th
- Dates: 23–24 July
- Host city: Kaunas, Lithuania
- Level: Senior
- Type: Outdoor

The 88th 2011 Lithuanian Athletics Championships were held in S. Darius and S. Girėnas Stadium, Kaunas on 23–24 July 2011.

== Men ==
=== Track events ===
Event	Gold		Silver		Bronze	
100 m	Rytis Sakalauskas	10.18 (NR)	Martynas Jurgilas	10.30	Aivaras Pranckevičius	10.63
200 m	Egidijus Dilys	21.40	Aivaras Pranckevičius	21.53	Žilvinas Adomavičius	21.76
400 m	Žilvinas Adomavičius	48.63	Gediminas Kučinskas	48.88	Linas Bružas	48.94
800 m	Vitalij Kozlov	1:49.91	Petras Gliebus	1:51.36	Mindaugas Norbutas	1:51.87
1500 m	Petras Gliebus	3:52.13	Remigijus Kančys	3:55.14	Andrej Jegorov	3:56.00
5000 m	Martynas Stanys	15:11.60	Aurimas Skinulis	15:25.53	Artūras Meška	15:51.08
110 m hurdles	Mantas Šilkauskas	14.35	Artūras Janauskas	14.64	Andrius Latvinskas	14.77
400 m hurdles	Silvestras Guogis	52.17	Valdas Valintėlis	53.43	Artūras Kulnis	53.96
3000 m steeplechase	Justinas Beržanskis	9:03.24	Andrej Jegorov	9:30.08	Justinas Križinauskas	9:40.31
4x100 m relay	Lithuanian Universities team	40.55	Panevėžys	43.36	Alytus	44.78
4x400 m relay	Vilnius	3:16.95	Šiauliai-Kelmė	3:22.92	Vilnius-Marijampolė	3:24.05.
WR world record | AR area record | CR championship record | GR games record | NR national record | OR Olympic record | PB personal best | SB season best | WL world leading (in a given season)

=== Field events ===
Event	Gold		Silver		Bronze	
High jump	Raivydas Stanys	2.26	Rimantas Mėlinis	2.05	Mantvydas Ambraziejus	2.05
Pole vault	Irmantas Lianzbergas	4.25	Edvinas Smetonis	4.10	Benas Kentra	4.10
Long jump	Povilas Mykolaitis	8.11	Darius Aučyna	7.96	Marius Vadeikis	7.80
Triple jump	Mantas Dilys	16.03	Marius Vadeikis	15.43	Andrius Gricevičius	15.33
Shot put	Rimantas Martišauskas	17.96	Artūras Gurklys	16.86	Vytautas Ugianskis	15.54
Discus throw	Virgilijus Alekna	67.90	Andrius Gudžius	58.50	Aleksas Abromavičius	56.75
Hammer throw	Tomas Juknevičius	61.85	Martynas Šedys	59.91	Andrius Stankevičius	54.04
Javelin throw	Nerijus Lučkauskas	70.31	Paulius Vaitiekus	64.95	Vytautas Jurša	61.16
WR world record | AR area record | CR championship record | GR games record | NR national record | OR Olympic record | PB personal best | SB season best | WL world leading (in a given season)

== Women ==
=== Track events ===
Event	Gold		Silver		Bronze	
100 m	Lina Grinčikaitė	11.42	Silva Pesackaitė	11.84	Silvestra Malinauskaitė	11.95
200 m	Lina Grinčikaitė	23.65	Agnė Orlauskaitė	24.13	Sofija Korf	25.56
400 m	Agnė Orlauskaitė	53.92	Eglė Balčiūnaitė	55.04	Eva Misiūnaitė	57.32
800 m	Eglė Balčiūnaitė	2:04.00	Aina Valatkevičiūtė	2:10.72	Banga Balnaitė	2:10.94
1500 m	Banga Balnaitė	4:28.34	Aina Valatkevičiūtė	4:34.36	Monika Juodeškaitė	4:37.54
5000 m	Gytė Norgilienė	16:54.49	Vaida Žūsinaitė	17:09.71	Rūta Juškevičiūtė	18:39.67
100 m hurdles	Sonata Tamošaitytė	13.12	Laura Ušanovaitė	14.12	Justina Abariūtė	14.24
400 m hurdles	Irma Mačiukaitė	1:01.90	Vlada Musvydaitė	1:02.13	Agnė Abramavičiūtė	1:02.63
3000 m steeplechase	Evelina Uševaitė	10:45.44	Karina Onufrijeva	11:42.49		
4x100 m relay	Lithuanian Universities team	44.81	Šiauliai	48.09	Klaipėda	49.86
4x400 m relay	Vilnius	3:55.05	"Vilniaus baltai"	3:57.67	"Nikė"	4:03.19
WR world record | AR area record | CR championship record | GR games record | NR national record | OR Olympic record | PB personal best | SB season best | WL world leading (in a given season)

=== Field events ===
Event	Gold		Silver		Bronze	
High jump	Viktorija Žemaitytė	1.80	Ineta Šeflerytė	1.70	Nelija Borisenko; Rūta Moliejūtė; Eglė Rocevičiūtė	1.65
Pole vault	Vitalija Dejeva	3.60	Giedrė Vikniūtė	3.30		
Long jump	Lina Andrijauskaitė	6.17	Asta Daukšaitė	6.13	Aistė Bernotaitytė	5.86
Triple jump	Jolanta Verseckaitė	13.66	Karina Vnukova	13.18	Dovilė Dzindzaletaitė	13.16
Shot put	Austra Skujytė	17.09	Sandra Mišeikytė	13.93	Larisa Voroneckaja	13.10
Discus throw	Zinaida Sendriūtė	61.40	Sabina Banytė	46.32	Larisa Voroneckaja	43.14
Hammer throw	Natalija Venckutė	48.25	Sandra Mišeikytė	46.91	Jūratė Domeikaitė	39.27
Javelin throw	Viktorija Barvičiūtė	53.77	Austra Skujytė	50.41	Simona Dobilaitė	45.84
WR world record | AR area record | CR championship record | GR games record | NR national record | OR Olympic record | PB personal best | SB season best | WL world leading (in a given season)
