= 2005 Lithuanian Athletics Championships =

- Edition: 82nd
- Dates: 8–9 July
- Host city: Kaunas, Lithuania
- Level: Senior
- Type: Outdoor

The 82nd 2005 Lithuanian Athletics Championships were held in S. Darius and S. Girėnas Stadium, Kaunas on 8–9 July 2005.

== Men ==
Event	Gold		Silver		Bronze	
100 m	Justas Buragas	10.62	Andrius Kačėnas	10.65	Rytis Sakalauskas	10.76
200 m	Raimondas Turla	21.24	Žilvinas Adomavičius	21.79	Donatas Krušinskas	21.83
400 m	Raimondas Turla	47.29	Audrius Šimkevičius	48.77	Vitalijus Gorbunovas	49.35
800 m	Mindaugas Norbutas	1:52.23	Vitalij Kozlov	1:53.11	Vygantas Juškevičius	1:53.34
1500 m	Mindaugas Norbutas	3:49.31	Karolis Levickis	3:49.49	Vitalij Gorlukovič	3:50.11
5000 m	Egidijus Rupšys	14:32.59	Vitalij Gorlukovič	14:35.55	Tomas Venckūnas	14:39.02
10000 m	Mindaugas Pukštas	30:35.53	Tomas Venckūnas	30:58.86	Arūnas Balčiūnas	32:59.08
110 m hurdles	Rolandas Stanionis	14.39	Giedrius Mačėnas	14.55	Andrius Kašinskas	15.08
400 m hurdles	Artūras Kulnis	52.50	Mindaugas Reinikovas	54.37	Vilius Šnipaitis	55.20
3000 m st.	Mindaugas Pukštas	8:53.84	Karolis Levickis	8:57.24	Aurimas Gudaitis	9:31.58
High jump	Nerijus Bužas	2.14	Modestas Žukauskas	2.08	Žilvinas Antanavičius	2.05
Pole vault	Saulius Birmanas	4.60	Audrius Baltrušaitis	4.40	Darius Draudvila	4.40
Long jump	Vytautas Seliukas	7.80	Marius Jasevičius	7.10	Darius Draudvila	7.05
Triple jump	Andrius Gricevičius	15.85	Dainius Babrauskas	15.22	Povilas Boguševičius	14.65
Shot put	Vytas Druktenis	17.23	Marius Višniakovas	16.18	Aleksas Abromavičius	16.03
Discus throw	Virgilijus Alekna	69.21	Andrius Butrimas	53.28	Marius Vyšniakovas	52.92
Javelin throw	Tomas Intas	76.65	Mindaugas Kurčenkovas	67.17	Valentas Voveris	64.17
Hammer throw	Žydrūnas Vasiliauskas	65.24	Ignas Germanavičius	52.42	Tautvydas Matulas	49.70
4 × 100 m	Kaunas	42.02	Šiauliai	42.70	Klaipėda	43.48
4 × 400 m	Šiauliai	3:17.47	National team	3:17.95	Klaipėda - Palanga	3:18.85

== Women ==
Event	Gold		Silver		Bronze	
100 m	Audra Dagelytė	11.68	Edita Lingytė	11.82	Inesa Rimkevičiūtė	12.23
200 m	Lina Grinčikaitė	23.60	Audra Dagelytė	23.86	Edita Lingytė	23.96
400 m	Jūratė Kudirkaitė	54.20	Jeketerina Šakovič	54.35	Aina Valatkevičiūtė	55.29
800 m	Irina Krakoviak	2:02.19	Aina Valatkevičiūtė	2:06.24	Alina Varpiotaitė	2:11.02
1500 m	Liubov Novosad	4:47.12	Monika Vilčinskaitė	4:48.04	Valerija Lišakova	4:53.97
5000 m	Živilė Balčiūnaitė	16:02.56	Eglė Krištaponytė	17:48.78	Remalda Kergytė	18:22.08
10000 m	Remalda Kergytė	39:05.22	Gražina Narvilienė	40:58.29	Justina Jackutė	43:15.47
100 m hurdles	Austra Skujytė	14.42	Sonata Tamošaitytė	14.43	Aistė Menčinskaitė	15.00
400 m hurdles	Vlada Musvydaitė	59.47	Miglė Meškauskaitė	1:04.20	Toma Žilytė	1:06.14
3000 m st.	Liubov Novosad	11:24.07	Ieva Bičkutė	12:22.04		
High jump	Austra Skujytė	1.82	Karina Vnukova	1.76	Viktorija Žemaitytė	1.76
Pole vault	Edita Grigelionytė	3.70	Rita Sadzevičienė	3.40	Ernesta Zinkevičiūtė	3.00
Long jump	Austra Skujytė	6.13	Živilė Šikšnelytė	6.05	Dovilė Klastaitytė	5.73
Triple jump	Asta Daukšaitė	12.81	Inga Urbonaitė	12.44	Raimonda Rimkutė	12.30
Shot put	Austra Skujytė	17.03	Alina Vaišvilaitė	14.66	Ugnė Bujūtė	11.69
Discus throw	Zinaida Sendriūtė	54.62	Giedrė Aleknaitė	47.88	Raminta Sakalauskaitė	47.83
Javelin throw	Inga Stasiulionytė	62.77	Indrė Jakubaitytė	52.69	Rita Ramanauskaitė	46.37
Hammer throw	Natalja Venckutė	50.21	Lina Kraskauskaitė	47.62	Vaida Kelečiūtė	47.57
4 × 100 m	Kaunas	46.75	Klaipėda	48.91	Vilnius	49.64
4 × 400 m	Klaipėda	3:59.42	Panevėžys	4:09.01		
