= 2007 Lithuanian Athletics Championships =

- Edition: 84th
- Dates: 28–29 July
- Host city: Kaunas, Lithuania
- Level: Senior
- Type: Outdoor

The 84th 2007 Lithuanian Athletics Championships were held in S. Darius and S. Girėnas Stadium, Kaunas on 28–29 July 2007.

== Men ==
	Gold		Silver		Bronze	
100 m	Žilvinas Adomavičius	10,82	Martynas Jurgilas	10,83	Justas Buragas	10,83
200 m	Žilvinas Adomavičius	21,75	Egidijus Dilys	22,09	Ruslanas Fakejevas	22,11
400 m	Linas Bružas	47,95	Artūras Kulnis	48,24	Raidas Jankauskas	49,07
800 m	Egidijus Švėgžda	1:53,36	Vygantas Juškevičius	1:53,83	Vitalijus Gorbunovas	1:54,20
1500 m	Vitalij Kozlov	3:52,35	Vygantas Juškevičius	3:53,51	Andrej Jegorov	3:55,86
5000 m	Tomas Matijošius	14:41,56	Mindaugas Viršilas	15:00,97	Justinas Križinauskas	15:13,58
10 000 m	Dainius Šaučikovas	31:57,66	Nerijus Markauskas	32:54,11	Valdas Gudaitis	33:01,70
110 m hurdles	Evaldas Pranckus	15,01	Aivaras Aksionovas	15,18	Karolis Verkys	15,30
400 m hurdles	Artūras Kulnis	51,19	Mindaugas Reinikovas	52,36	Valdas Valintėlis	53,26
3000 m st.	Tomas Matijošius	9:19,86	Andrej Jegorov	9:24,40	Justinas Križinauskas	9:28,70
20 km walk	Tadas Šuškevičius	1:25:42	Marius Žiūkas	1:28:43	Ričardas Rekst	1:30:15
4 × 100 m	Kaunas/Alytus U23	41,27	National U20 team	41,43	Alytus	43,61
4 × 400 m	Klaipėda	3:13,79	Šiauliai	3:19,60	Kaunas	3:21,61
High jump	Rimantas Mėlinis	2,10	Raivydas Stanys	2,05	Tomas Turskis	2,00
Pole vault	Eimantas Spitrys	3,80	Vaidas Basevičius	3,60	Audrius Zimkevičius	3,60
Long jump	Vytautas Seliukas	7,25	Andrius Gricevičius	7,22	Marius Vadeikis	7,19
Triple jump	Mantas Dilys	15,99	Arvydas Nazarovas	15,74	Dainius Babrauskas	15,48
Shot put	Paulius Luožys	17,35	Aleksas Abromavičius	16,53	Rimantas Martišauskas	16,30
Discus throw	Aleksas Abromavičius	54,86	Giedrius Šakinis	51,59	Andrius Šipalis	51,12
Hammer throw	Žydrūnas Vasiliauskas	56,43	Vytas Gudauskas	52,94	Ignas Germanavičius	50,40
Javelin throw	Tomas Intas	73,25	Valentas Voveris	72,52	Ramūnas Butkus	65,25

== Women ==
	Gold		Silver		Bronze	
100 m	Audra Dagelytė	11,50	Edita Lingytė	11,77	Inesa Rimkevičiūtė	12,44
200 m	Edita Lingytė	24,21	Akvilė Ališauskaitė	25,12	Inesa Rimkevičiūtė	25,62
400 m	Jūratė Kudirkaitė	54,23	Agnė Orlauksaitė	54,31	Eglė Balčiūnaitė	54,53
800 m	Jekaterina Šakovič	2:04,46	Eglė Balčiūnmaitė	2:05,69	Eglė Krištaponytė	2:06,87
1500 m	Rasa Drazdauskaitė	4:21,83	Eglė Krištaponytė	4:25,03	Monika Vilčinskaitė	4:37,97
5000 m	Vaida Žūsinaitė	17:04,13	Justina Jasutytė	17:15,70	Gytė Norgilienė	17:20,12
10 000 m	Remalda Kergytė	35:21,04	Gytė Norgilienė	36:35,76	Justina Jasutytė	36:42,08
100 m hurdles	Sonata Tamošaitytė	14,23	Laura Ušanovaitė	15,49	Aušra Zakarauskaitė	15,71
400 m hurdles	Natalija Piliušina	1:01,00	Kristina Jasinskaitė	1:03,78	Vaida Indenauskaitė	1:05,04
3000 m st.	Gintarė Kubiliūtė	11:31,95	Erika Erminaitė	11:51,22	Laima Jacytė	14:12,26
20 km walk	Neringa Aidietytė	1:35:33	Jurgita Meškauskienė	1:36:44	Rita Kaselytė	1:48:50
4 × 100 m	Kaunas	45,72	Vilnius	49,97		
4 × 400 m	Kaunas	3:50,24	Panevėžys	4:01,74	Alytus	4:11,05
High jump	Karina Vnukova	1,85	Eglė Poškutė	1,70	Milda Kulikauskaitė	1,65
Pole vault	Vitalija Dejeva	3,30	Aušra Vinslovaitė	2,70		
Long jump	Austra Skujytė	6,15	Viktorija Žemaitytė	6,09	Ernesta Karaškienė	6,05
Triple jump	Ieva Staponkutė	12,71	Karina Vnukova	12,70	Jolanta Verseckaitė	12,39
Shot put	Austra Skujytė	16,71	Alina Vaišvilaitė	14,78	Ugnė Bujūtė	13,90
Discus throw	Zinaida Sendriūtė	55,25	Ugnė Bujūtė	48,27	Giedrė Aleknaitė	44,09
Hammer throw	Vaida Kelečiūtė	52,65	Natalija Venckutė	48,46	Živilė Ščevinskaitė	46,61
Javelin throw	Indrė Jakubaitytė	60,46	Inga Stasiulionytė	55,17	Viktorija Barvičiūtė	48,14
