= 2009 Lithuanian Athletics Championships =

- Edition: 86th
- Dates: 1–2 August
- Host city: Kaunas, Lithuania
- Level: Senior
- Type: Outdoor

The 2009 Lithuanian Athletics Championships were held in S. Darius and S. Girėnas Stadium, Kaunas on August 1–2, 2009. The Championships was also qualifications for 2009 World Championships in Athletics.

== Men ==
Event	1st place		2nd place		3rd place	
100 m	Rytis Sakalauskas	10,48	Žilvinas Adomavičius	10,65	Aivaras Pranckevičius	10,77
200 m	Rytis Sakalauskas	21,07	Žilvinas Adomavičius	21,25	Egidijus Dilys	21,60
400 m	Linas Bružas	48,67	Domantas Žalga	48,87	Raimondas Turla	49,49
800 m	Vitalij Kozlov	1.51,00	Marekas Strelkovskis	1:53,74	Darius Bagaslauskas	1:54,46
1 500 m	Petras Gliebus	3:52,10	Justinas Beržanskis	3:52,78	Tomas Matijošius	3:53,18
5 000 m	Robertas Geralavičius	14:45,78	Tomas Matijošius	14:48,16	Mindaugas Viršilas	15:04,73
10 000 m	Marius Diliūnas	31:10,91	Kęstutis Jankūnas	31:53,17	Tomas Venckūnas	31:58,52
4 × 100 m	Lithuanian U23 team Egidijus Dilys; Rytis Sakalauskas; Martas Skrabulis; Aivaras Pranckevičius	40,75	Lithuanian U18 team Vainius Mieliauskas; Domantas Žalga; Kostas Skrabulis; Žilvinas Mitrikevičius	41,93	Alytus's team Ignas Slančiauskas; Tomas Rėklys; Marius Bagdonas; Ramūnas Simanavičius	43,88
4 × 400 m	Team Atletas (Kaunas) Rimvydas Smilgys; Mantas Saliamonas; Aidas Krakauskas; Žilvinas Adomavičius	3:19,34	Klaipėda's team Karolis Paulauskas; Artūras Janauskas; Tadas Petraitis; Linas Bružas	3:20,15	Vilkaviškis's team Modestas Saldukaitis; Egidijus Rūkas; Nerijus Markauskas; Mindaugas Striokas	3:32,26
110 m hurdles	Artūras Janauskas	15,20	Andrius Latvinskas	15,35	Deividas Balčius	16,30
400 m hurdles	Silvestras Guogis	52,20	Valdas Valintėlis	52,55	Artūras Kulnis	53,00
3 000 m steeplechase	Justinas Beržanskis	9:23,12	Andrej Jegorov	9:26,67	Justinas Križinauskas	9:37,09
Triple Jump	Mantas Dilys	16.68	Marius Vadeikis	15.61	Vytas Raugas	15.45
Long Jump	Marius Vadeikis	7.30	Darius Aučyna	7.18	Tomas Buivydas	7.14
High Jump	Raivydas Stanys	2.24	Nerijus Bužas	2.15	Rimantas Mėlinis	2.10
Pole Vault	Audrius Zimkevičius	4.00	Irmantas Lianzbergas	4.00	Arnoldas Stanelis	3.80
Shot Put	Paulius Luožys	17.69	Rimantas Martišauskas	17.35	Romanas Morozka	17.08
Hammer Throw	Tomas Burkas	57.29	Martynas Šedys	55.30	Andrius Stankevičius	51.24
Discus Throw	Virgilijus Alekna	68.44	Aleksas Abromavičius	56.71	Giedrius Šakinis	54.22
Javelin Throw	Tomas Intas	78.08	Arūnas Jurkšas	70.16	Ramūnas Butkus	69.71

== Women ==
Event	1st place		2nd place		3rd place	
100 m	Lina Grinčikaitė	11,63	Silva Pesackaitė	11,90	Inesa Rimkevičiūtė	11,96
200 m	Silva Pesackaitė	24,23	Sonata Tamošaitytė	24,46	Inesa Rimkevičiūtė	24,95
400 m	Agnė Orlauskaitė	54,17	Aina Valatkevičiūtė	55,89	Natalija Piliušina	56,62
800 m	Irina Krakoviak	2:05,12	Eglė Balčiūnaitė	2:05,31	Aina Valatkevičiūtė	2:06,01
1 500 m	Irina Krakoviak	4:18,21	Eglė Krištaponytė	4:31,29	Evelina Uševaitė	4:37,10
5 000 m	Vaida Žūsinaitė	16:45,88	Gytė Norgilienė	18:06,54	Rūta Narkutė	19:37,24
10 000 m	Rasa Drazdauskaitė	33:47,19	Živilė Balčiūnaitė	34:32,38	Remalda Kergytė	35:48,00
4 × 100 m	Lithuanian U-23 team Silva Pesackaitė; Lina Andrijauskaitė; Sonata Tamošaitytė; Lina Grinčikaitė	44,85	Second united team Natalija Valetova; Silvestra Malinauskaitė; Eglė Andrijauskaitė; Inesa Rimkevičiūtė	46,66		
4 × 400 m	Team Viltis (Kaunas) Karolina Sodeikaitė; Odeta Vaičiulytė; Kristina Majauskaitė; Agnė Orlauskaitė	3:58,79	Šiauliai's team Svajūnė Lianzbergaitė; Augustė Labenskytė; Alina Grigaravičiūtė; Evelina Uševaitė	4:13,96		
100 m hurdles	Sonata Tamošaitytė	13,73	Sigita Lasavičiūtė	14,98	Laura Ušanovaitė	15,12
400 m hurdles	Kristina Jasinskaitė	1:01,90	Inesa Bolotina	1:02,17	Agnė Abramavičiūtė	1:04,30
3 000 m steeplechase	Evelina Uševaitė	11:07,76	Snežana Dopolskaitė	12:09,77	Augustė Labenskytė	12:09,97
Triple Jump	Jolanta Verseckaitė	13,72	Aistė Bernotaitytė	12,28	Indrė Sabaliauskaitė	12,09
Long Jump	Lina Andrijauskaitė	6,24	Eglė Kondrotaitė	6,04	Aistė Bernotaitytė	5,87
High Jump	Karina Vnukova	1,83	Airinė Palšytė	1,80	Milda Kulikauskaitė	1,75
Pole Vault	Vitalija Dejeva	3,40	Sandra Bingelytė	3,00	Kristina Sabalytė	2,90
Shot Put	Austra Skujytė	17,28	Alina Vaišvilaitė	14,29	Virmantė Vaičekonytė	13,83
Hammer Throw	Vaida Kelečiūtė	49,03	Margarita Matulevičiūtė	47,21	Natalija Venckutė	46,49
Discus Throw	Austra Skujytė	50,50	Giedrė Aleknaitė	46,64	Sabina Banytė	45,02
Javelin Throw	Indrė Jakubaitytė	56,92	Viktorija Barvičiūtė	49,00	Giedrė Kupstytė	45,27

== Medals by city ==
Pl.	City	Gold medal	Silver medal	Bronze medal	Total
1	Kaunas	17	10	11	38
2	Vilnius	11	14	8	33
3	Šiauliai	4	4	10	18
4	Klaipėda	3	5	2	10
5	Panevėžys	2	3	0	5
6	United Team	2	2	0	4
7	Kaišiadorys	1	0	0	1
8	Marijampolė	0	2	1	3
9	Paberžė	0	1	0	1
10	Alytus	0	0	1	1
10	Jurbarkas	0	0	1	1
10	Kretinga	0	0	1	1
10	Švenčionys	0	0	1	1
10	Vilkaviškis	0	0	1	1

== See also ==
- Lithuania at the 2009 World Championships in Athletics
