= 2010 Lithuanian Athletics Championships =

- Edition: 87th
- Dates: 9–10 July
- Host city: Kaunas, Lithuania
- Level: Senior
- Type: Outdoor

The 87th 2010 Lithuanian Athletics Championships were held in S. Darius and S. Girėnas Stadium, Kaunas on 9–10 July 2010.

== Men ==
	Gold		Silver		Bronze	
100 m (+ 0,6 m/s)	Martas Skrabulis	10.70 (PB)	Aivaras Pranckevičius	10.75	Egidijus Dilys	10.88
200 m (+0,9 m/s)	Egidijus Dilys	21.39	Aivaras Pranckevičius	21.67	Ruslanas Fakejevas	21.67
400 m	Vitalij Kozlov	47.03 (PB)	Silvestras Guogis	47.46	Domantas Žalga	48.16
800 m	Vitalij Kozlov	1:51.54	Petras Gliebus	1:51.90	Juozas Gliebus	1:52.90
1 500 m	Petras Gliebus	3:51.51	Tomas Matijošius	3:52.86	Justinas Beržanski	3:56.5
5 000 m	Tomas Matijošius	14:31.87	Remigijus Kančys	15:42.29	Kęstutis Jankūnas	15:53.12
10000 m	Marius Diliūnas	31:57.23	Aurimas Skinulis	31:59.28	Mindaugas Pukšta	32:21.54
4 × 100 m	United team Egidijus Dilys; Martas Skrabulis; Aivaras Pranckevičius; Mantas Šilkauskas	40.55	Kaunas Kostas Skrabulis; Ruslanas Fakejevas; Darius Aučyna; Tomas Rėklys	41.39	Vilnius Justas Buragas; Vytautas Balkūnas; Rytis Andrijaitis; Paulius Ibianskas	42.04
4 × 400 m	Panevėžys Svajūnas Kubilius; Rimvydas Smilgys; Deividas Katelė; Domantas Žalga	3:18.85	Vilnius Dalius Pavliukovičius; Mindaugas Striokas; Juozas Gliebus; Petras Gliebus	3:19.21	Šiauliai Mantas Šernas; Egidijus Švėgžda; Justinas Beržanskis; Gediminas Kučinskas	3:23.69
110 m hurdles (-0,1 m/s)	Mantas Šilkauskas	13,89 (PB)	Artūras Janauskas	14,64	Andrius Latvinskas	14,89
400 m hurdles	Silvestras Guogis	51.52 (=PB)	Artūras Kulnis	52.58	Rimvydas Smilgys	54.57
3 000 m st.	Justinas Beržanskis	9:14.45	Mindaugas Pukštas	9:15.69	Justinas Križinauskas	9:28.24
Triple jump	Mantas Dilys	16,21	Andrius Gricevičius	15,98	Darius Aučyna	15,49
Long jump	Povilas Mykolaitis	7,94 (SB)	Darius Aučyna	7,73	Marius Vadeikis	7,63
High jump	Rimantas Mėlinis	2,08	Ernestas Raudys	2,08	Vaidas Antanavičius	2,04
Pole vault	Darius Draudvila	4,20	Arnoldas Stanelis	4,20	Irmantas Lianzbergas	4,20
Shot Put	Rimantas Martišauskas	17,95	Artūras Gurklys	17,56	Romanas Morozka	16,27
Discus Throw	Aleksas Abromavičius	63,32 (PB)	Andrius Gudžius	60,98	Giedrius Šakinis	57,20
Hammer Throw	Andrius Stankevičius	56,58	Arvydas Menkevičius	54,82	Vytas Gudauskas	47,02
Javelin Throw	Paulius Vaitiekus	66,74	Vaidas Miščikas	66,10	Edvardas Matusevičius	64,77

== Women ==
	Gold		Silver		Bronze	
100 m (+0,8 m/s)	Lina Grinčikaitė	11.44	Edita Kavaliauskienė	11.95	Silva Pesackaitė	12.17
200 m (+1,6 m/s)	Silva Pesackaitė	24.16 (PB)	Agnė Orlauskaitė	24.50	Živilė Brokoriūtė	24.61
400 m	Eglė Balčiūnaitė	54.45	Agnė Orlauskaitė	55.19	Andželika Bobrova	56.89
800 m	Eglė Balčiūnaitė	2:03.77	Natalija Piliušina	2:08.49	Viktorija Latyšovičiūtė	2:13.50
1 500 m	Eglė Krištaponytė	4:22.75 (SB)	Aina Valatkevičiūtė	4:25.00	Natalija Piliušina	4:28.38
5 000 m	Eglė Krištaponytė	16:52.01 (PB)	Vaida Žūsinaitė	17:06.00	Gytė Norgilienė	17:14.35
10000 m	Rasa Drazdauskaitė	33:16.06 (PB)	Gytė Norgilienė	35:35.64 (PB)	Diana Lobačevskė	36:15.70
4 × 100 m	Kaunas Eglė Tamošiūnaitė; Marta Palmaitytė; Karolina Sodeikaitė; Andželika Bobrova	49.68	Vilnius Gabrielė Romanovskytė; Jūratė Vaišnoraitė; Justina Abariūtė; Eglė Kondrotaitė	51.30	Not awarded	
4 × 400 m	Vilnius Viktorija Latyšovičiūtė; Rasa Batulevičiūtė; Agnė Ganytė; Laura Malkevičiūtė	3:59.25	Šiauliai Eva Misiūnaitė; Augustė Labenskytė; Evelina Uševaitė; Svajūnė Lianzbergaitė	4:00.56	Alytus Agnė Plauskaitė; Robera Stučkaitė; Ernesta Bartaševičiūtė; Odeta Vaičiulytė	4:01.55
100 m hurdles	Sonata Tamošaitytė	13,26 (SB)	Živilė Brokoriūtė	14,15	Justina Abariūtė	14,33
400 m hurdles	Irma Mačiukaitė	1:00.70 (PB)	Kristina Jasinskaitė	1:01.05	Svajūnė Lianzbergaitė	1:05.25
3 000 m st.	Evelina Uševaitė	11:34.02	Augustė Labenskytė	11:49.03 (PB)	Snežana Dopolskaitė	12:13.50
Triple jump	Jolanta Verseckaitė	13,71 (SB)	Jana Nosova	13,22	Dovilė Dzindzaletaitė	12,80
Long jump	Lina Andrijauskaitė	6,61	Asta Daukšaitė	6,34	Eglė Kondrotaitė	5,84
High jump	Airinė Palšytė	1,78	Milda Kulikauskaitė	1,74	Karina Vnukova	1,70
Pole vault	Vitalija Dejeva	3.53	Giedrė Vikniūtė	3.33	Sandra Bingelytė	3.23
Shot put	Austra Skujytė	17,25 (SB)	Laura Gedminaitė	13,59	Sandra Mišeikytė	13,42
Discus throw	Zinaida Sendriūtė	58,49	Austra Skujytė	53,89 (PB)	Sabina Banytė	46,82
Hammer throw	Margarita Matulevičiūtė	46,83	Natalija Venckutė	46,36	Sandra Mišeikytė	44,82
Javelin throw	Indrė Jakubaitytė	54,43	Giedrė Kupstytė	48,21	Ieva Ščiukauskaitė	45,49
