= 2008 Lithuanian Athletics Championships =

- Edition: 85th
- Dates: 18–19 July
- Host city: Kaunas, Lithuania
- Level: Senior
- Type: Outdoor

The 85th 2008 Lithuanian Athletics Championships were held in S. Darius and S. Girėnas Stadium, Kaunas on 18–19 July 2008.

== Men ==
	Gold		Silver		Bronze	
100 m	Rytis Sakalauskas	10,73	Žilvinas Adomavičius	10,82	Mindaugas Baliukonis	10,84
200 m	Žilvinas Adomavičius	21,07	Egidijus Dilys	21,54	Rytis Sakalauskas	21,56
400 m	Silvestras Guogis	48,52	Raimondas Turla	48,75	Egidijus Švėgžda	49,07
800 m	Vitalij Kozlov	1:46,58	Tomas Petrauskas	1:51,63	Aivaras Krakauskas	1:53,29
1 500 m	Aidas Krakauskas	3:55,02	Justinas Beržauskas	3:56,19	Andrej Jegorov	3:57,91
5 000 m	Tomas Matijošius	14:59,15	Nerijus Markauskas	15:31,15	Egidijus Rūkas	15:36,53
10 000 m	Marius Diliūnas	31:41,22	Aurimas Skinulis	32:00,34	Nerijus Markauskas	32:36,62
4 × 100 m	Kaunas	41,13	„Cosma-2“	41,97	Alytus	42,59
4 × 400 m	Kaunas	3:21,71	Klaipėda	3:23,13	Alytus	3:24,69
110 m hurdles	Mantas Šilkauskas	14,34	Artūras Janauskas	14,94	Karolis Verkys	15,23
400 m hurdles	Valdas Valintėlis	51,66	Silvestras Guogis	53,94	Edvinas Godvišas	54,27
3 000 m st.	Tomas Matijošius	9:10,72	Andrej Jegorov	9:22,64	Justinas Križinauskas	9:31,31
Triple jump	Povilas Mykolaitis	16,38	Mantas Dilys	15,90	Andrius Gricevičius	15,46
Long jump	Povilas Mykolaitis	7,86	Darius Aučyna	7,82	Andrius Gricevičius	7,62
High jump	Raivydas Stanys	2,22	Kazmir Narvoiš	2,05	Vaidas Antanavičius	2,05
Pole vault	Saulius Birmanas	4,60	Eimantas Spitrys	4,20	Audrius Zimkevičius	4,00
Shot Put	Paulius Luožys	18,02	Aleksas Abromavičius	17,19	Artūras Gurklys	16,87
Discus Throw	Virgilijus Alekna	67,77	Aleksas Abromavičius	57,63	Andrius Gudžius	53,52
Hammer Throw	Tomas Burkas	54,61	Andrius Stankevičius	54,12	Ignas Germanavičius	49,95
Javelin Throw	Ramūnas Butkus	72,24	Nerijus Lučkauskas	69,72	Aidas Aleksonis	68,53

== Women ==
	Gold		Silver		Bronze	
100 m	Lina Grinčikaitė	11,50	Audra Dagelytė	11,59	Lina Andrijauskaitė	11,86
200 m	Audra Dagelytė	24,23	Agnė Orlauskaitė	24,64	Živilė Brokoriūtė	25,52
400 m	Agnė Orlauksaitė	53,56	Jūratė Stanislovaitienė	54,18	Eglė Balčiūnaitė	54,94
800 m	Jakaterina šŠakovič	2:07,24	Natalija Piliušina	2:07,94	Aina Valatkevičiūtė	2:08,01
1500 m	Eglė Krištaponytė	4:25,10	Natalija Piliušina	4:33,45	Rūta Bukauskaitė	4:48,83
5000 m	Vaida Žūsinaitė	16:44,54	Remalda Kergytė	17:25,97	Justina Jasutytė	17:44,79
100 m hurdles	Sonata Tamošaitytė	14,01	Austra Skujytė	14,30	Viktorija Žemaitytė	14,44
400 m hurdles	Kristina Jasinskaitė	1:02,21	Eglė Andrijauskaitė	1:03,58	Jana Nosova	1:05,31
3000 m st.	Gintarė Kubiliūtė	11:29,38	Erika Erminaitė	12:04,77	Siga Juozapavičiūtė	12:20,79
10 000 m	Remalda Kergytė	37:03,45	Justina Jasutytė	38:05,68	Jadvyga Sinkevičiūtė	40:51,78
4 × 100 m	Lietuvos rintkinė	44,22	Kaunas	47,12	Vilnius	48,43
4 × 400 m	Kaunas	3:47,04	Alytus	3:58,29	Šiauliai	4:02,97
High jump	Karina Vnukova	1,83	Airinė Palšytė	1,70	Milda Kulikauskaitė	1,65
Pole vault	Edita Grigelionytė	3,60	Vitalija Dejeva	3,30	Kristina Sabalytė	2,60
Long jump	Lina Andrijauskaitė	6,32	Aistė Bernonaitytė	5,96	Eglė Kondrotaitė	5,79
Triple jump	Asta Daukšaitė	12,67	Indrė Sabaliauskaitė	12,46	Milda Armalytė	11,45
Shot put	Alina Vaišvilaitė	15,42	Virmantė Vaičekonytė	14,80	Viktorija Žemaitytė	14,04
Discus throw	Zinaida Sendriūtė	59,42	Simona Rupeikaitė	44,25	Giedrė Aleknaitė	43,43
Hammer throw	Vaida Kelečiūtė	52,41	Natalija Venckutė	47,19	Živilė Ščevinskaitė	46,14
Javelin throw	Inga Stasiulionytė	55,39	Indrė Jakubaitytė	53,00	Austra Skujytė	47,45
