= SELL Student Games =

Multi-sport event for students

SELL Student Games is a multi-sport event, held annually, that is open to all university and college students worldwide. The Games are named as an acronym after the hosting Baltic Region countries in their native languages – Finland, Estonia, Latvia and Lithuania (Finnish: Suomi, Estonian: Eesti, Latvian: Latvija, Lithuanian: Lietuva). The principles of the games are that everyone can participate and therefore the event combines top sports and joyful student event. The most recent 2026 games gather around 1,200 competing students.

== Events ==
The main disciplines of the games are athletics, swimming, orienteering, judo, powerlifting and chess as individual events. Basketball and 3x3 basketball, volleyball and beach volleyball, seven-a-side football and floorball / unihockey are as team events. Also tennis, badminton, table tennis, padel, wrestling, ultimate frisbee, aesthetic group gymnastics and ice-hockey has appeared in the games.

== History ==
In 1923 student organizations of Finland, Estonia, Latvia and Lithuania established an extensive co-operation agreement, which resulted in first regional student competition for the university students of the respective countries in Tartu, Estonia. During this period there were organized separately summer games, winter games and chess tournaments. The competitions lasted until 1940 when the last winter games were held before the ties between Baltic States were severed by occupation of the Baltic States around the World War II.

After Baltic States became independent again the tradition of competition was restored in a meeting held 21 April 1997, and the 1998 SELL Games were organized in Tartu. The competition has been open to all university students around the world since then.

== Hosts ==
=== SELL summer games ===
| | Year | Host |
|---|---|---|
| I | 1923 | Tartu, Estonia |
| II | 1924 | Riga, Latvia |
| III | 1926 | Helsinki, Finland |
| IV | 1929 | Kaunas, Lithuania |
| V | 1930 | Tallinn, Estonia |
| VI | 1931 | Riga, Latvia |
| VII | 1932 | Helsinki, Finland |
| VIII | 1933 | Kaunas, Lithuania |
| IX | 1934 | Tartu, Estonia |
| X | 1935 | Riga, Latvia |
| XI | 1936 | Helsinki, Finland |
| XII | 1937 | Kaunas, Lithuania |
| XIII | 1938 | Tartu, Estonia |
| XIV | 1939 | Riga, Latvia (cancelled) |
| | 1940–1997 | Not held |
| XV | 1998 | Tartu, Estonia |
| XVI | 1999 | Kaunas, Lithuania |
| XVII | 2000 | Jelgava, Latvia |
| XVIII | 2002 | Tartu, Estonia |
| XIX | 2003 | Kaunas, Lithuania |
| XX | 2004 | Tampere, Finland |
| XXI | 2005 | Riga, Latvia |
| XXII | 2006 | Tartu, Estonia |
| XXIII | 2007 | Kaunas, Lithuania |
| XXIV | 2008 | Espoo, Finland |
| XXV | 2009 | Jelgava, Latvia |
| XXVI | 2010 | Tartu, Estonia |
| XXVII | 2011 | Kaunas, Lithuania |
| XXVIII | 2012 | Espoo, Finland |
| XXIX | 2013 | Riga, Latvia |
| XXX | 2014 | Tartu, Estonia |
| XXXI | 2015 | Kaunas, Lithuania |
| XXXII | 2016 | Tampere, Finland |
| XXXIII | 2017 | Riga, Latvia |
| XXXIV | 2018 | Tartu, Estonia |
| XXXV | 2019 | Kaunas, Lithuania |
| XXXVI | 2020 | Lahti, Finland (cancelled) |
| | 2021 | Not held |
| XXXVII | 2022 | Riga, Latvia |
| XXXVIII | 2023 | Tartu, Estonia |
| XXXIX | 2024 | Kaunas, Lithuania |
| XL | 2025 | Vierumaki, Finland |
| XLI | 2026 | Riga, Latvia |

=== SELL winter games ===
| | Year | Host |
|---|---|---|
| I | 1929 | Riga, Latvia |
| II | 1931 | Helsinki, Finland |
| III | 1933 | Kaunas, Lithuania (cancelled) |
| IV | 1935 | Riga & Sigulda, Latvia |
| V | 1938 | Zarasai, Lithuania |
| VI | 1940 | Otepää, Estonia |

=== SELL chess tournaments ===
| | Year | Host |
|---|---|---|
| I | 1937 | Riga, Latvia |
| II | 1938 | Tartu, Estonia |
| III | 1939 | Helsinki, Finland |

== Results ==
=== 2022 ===
| Rank | yes | Gold | Silver | Bronze | Total |
|---|---|---|---|---|---|
| 1 | Lithuania (LTU) | 67 | 47 | 47 | 161 |
| 2 | Latvia (LAT) | 25 | 32 | 44 | 101 |
| 3 | Estonia (EST) | 3 | 9 | 6 | 18 |
| 4 | Finland (FIN) | 3 | 1 | 0 | 4 |
| 5 | Slovakia (SVK) | 0 | 1 | 0 | 1 |
| Totals (5 entries) | | 98 | 90 | 97 | 285 |

== Records ==
Athletics has been one of the sports held at the Games since the inaugural edition.

=== Men's athletics ===
| Event | Record | Athlete | Nationality | Year | Games | Ref. |
|---|---|---|---|---|---|---|
| 100 m | 10.47 | Rytis Sakalauskas | Lithuania | 2010 | (Estonia) Tartu | |
| 200 m | 20.89 | Rytis Sakalauskas | Lithuania | 2010 | (Estonia) Tartu | |
| 400 m | 47.20 | Jānis Leitis | Latvia | 2010 | (Estonia) Tartu | |
| 800 m | 1:50.29 | Vitalij Kozlov | Lithuania | 2007 | (Lithuania) Kaunas | |
| 1500 m | 3:45.85 | Dmitrijs Jurkevičs | Latvia | 24 May 2013 | Riga, Latvia | |
| 5000 m | 14:18.23 | Simas Bertašius | Lithuania | 20 May 2017 | Riga, Latvia | |
| 110 m hurdles | 13.85 (+1.2 m/s) | Elmo Lakka | Finland | 13 May 2016 | Tampere, Finland | |
| 400 m hurdles | 52.27 | Valdas Valintėlis | Lithuania | 2011 | (Lithuania) Kaunas | |
| High jump | 2.25 m | Raivydas Stanys | Lithuania | 25 May 2013 | Riga, Latvia | |
| Long jump | 7.78 m | Povilas Mykolaitis | Lithuania | 2003 | (Lithuania) Kaunas | |
| Triple jump | 16.10 m | Mantas Dilys | Lithuania | 2010 | (Estonia) Tartu | |
| Shot put | 20.05 m | Māris Urtāns | Latvia | 2007 | (Lithuania) Kaunas | |
| Discus throw | 64.79 m | Andrius Gudžius | Lithuania | 17 May 2014 | Tartu, Estonia | |
| Hammer throw | 59.56 m | Juha Rinta-aho | Finland | 14 May 2016 | Tampere, Finland | |
| Javelin throw | 86.36 m | Vadims Vasilevskis | Latvia | 2007 | (Lithuania) Kaunas | |
| 5000 m walk (track) | 20:16.07 | Marius Žiūkas | Lithuania | 2011 | (Lithuania) Kaunas | |
| 4 × 100 m relay | 40.57 | LKKA | Lithuania | 2010 | (Estonia) Tartu | |

=== Women's athletics ===
| Event | Record | Athlete | Nationality | Year | Games | Ref. |
|---|---|---|---|---|---|---|
| 100 m | 11.51 | Lina Grinčikaitė | Lithuania | 2010 | (Estonia) Tartu | |
| 200 m | 23.69 | Lina Grinčikaitė | Lithuania | 2010 | (Estonia) Tartu | |
| 400 m | 53.48 | Agnė Orlauskaitė | Lithuania | 2011 | (Lithuania) Kaunas | |
| 800 m | 2:02.55 | Eglė Balčiūnaitė | Lithuania | 2008 | (Finland) Espoo | |
| 1500 m | 4:21.12 | Rasa Drazdauskaitė | Lithuania | 2003 | (Lithuania) Kaunas | |
| 3000 m | 9:20.93 | Vaida Žūsinaitė | Lithuania | May 2012 | Espoo, Finland | |
| 5000 m | 16:38.90 | Milda Vilčinskaitė | Lithuania | 14 May 2016 | Tampere, Finland | |
| 100 m hurdles | 13.55 | Sonata Tamošaitytė | Lithuania | 2011 | (Lithuania) Kaunas | |
| 400 m hurdles | 1:01.82 | Sandra Kruma | Latvia | 2009 | (Latvia) Jelgava | |
| High jump | 1.92 m | Anna Iljuštšenko | Estonia | 2010 | (Estonia) Tartu | |
| Long jump | 6.40 (−1.2 m/s) | Aiga Grabuste | Latvia | 16 May 2014 | Tartu, Estonia | |
| Triple jump | 13.42 m | Adrija Grocienė | Lithuania | 2000 | (Latvia) Jelgava | |
| Shot put | 16.50 m | Chia-Ying Lin | China | 2006 | (Estonia) Tartu | |
| Discus throw | 51.75 m | Dace Ruskule | Latvia | 2003 | (Lithuania) Kaunas | |
| Hammer throw | 63.33 m | Kati Ojaloo | Estonia | 14 May 2016 | Tampere, Finland | |
| Javelin throw | 61.60 m | Anete Kociņa | Latvia | 19 May 2017 | Riga, Latvia | |
| 3000 m walk (track) | 13:10.75 | Anita Kažemaka | Latvia | 2011 | (Lithuania) Kaunas | |
| 4 × 100 m relay | 45.93 | LKKA | Lithuania | 2007 | (Lithuania) Kaunas | |

== See also ==
- South American University Games
- European Universities Games
- ASEAN University Games
- All-Africa University Games
- Baltic Sea Games
