= 2002 Lithuanian Athletics Championships =

- Edition: 79th
- Dates: 13–14 August
- Host city: Kaunas, Lithuania
- Level: Senior
- Type: Outdoor

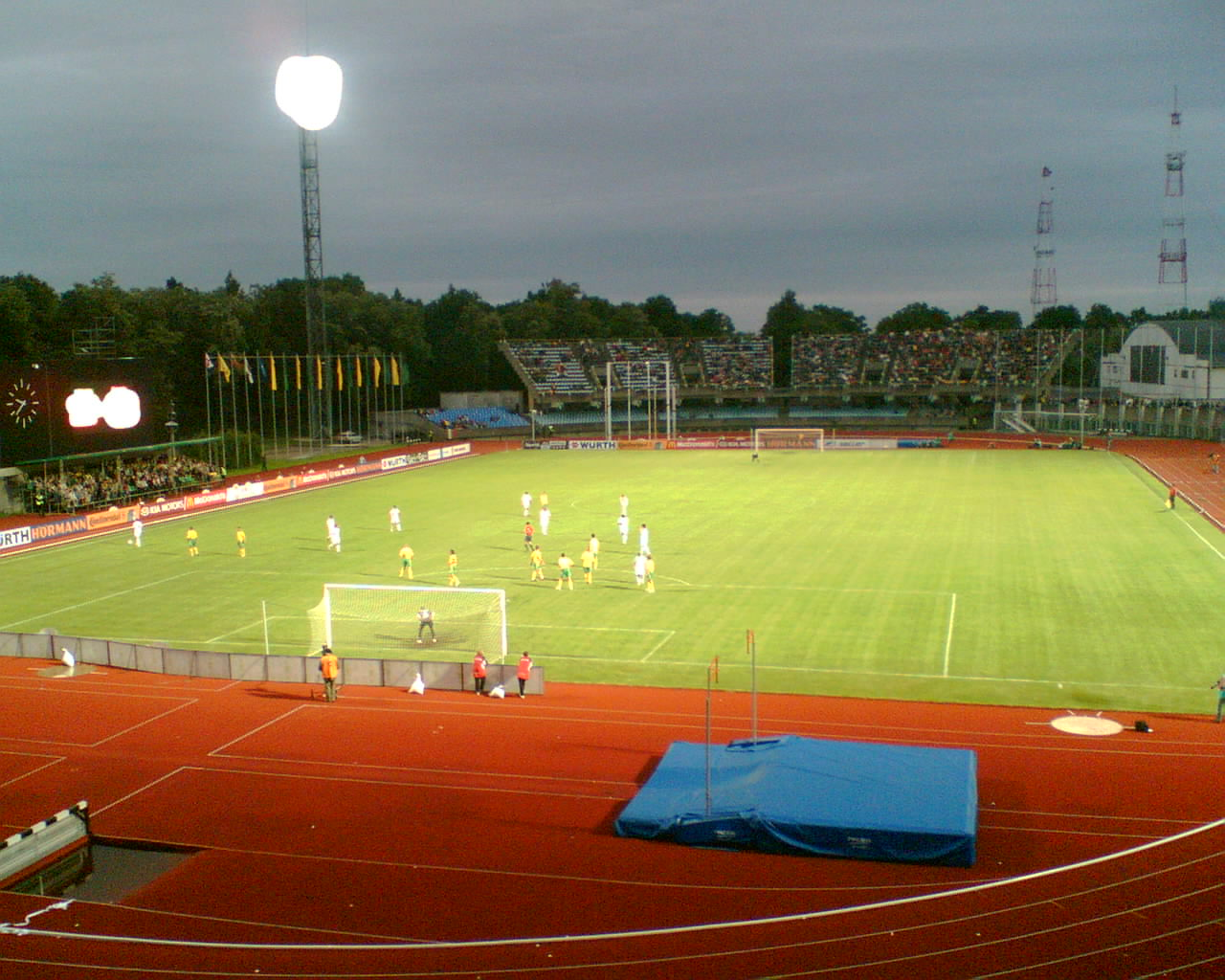
S. Darius and S. Girėnas Stadium, Kaunas

The 2002 Lithuanian Athletics Championships were held at the S. Darius and S. Girėnas Stadium in Kaunas on August 13 and August 14, 2002.

== Men ==
Event	1st place		2nd place		3rd place	
100 m	Dainius Šerpytis	10,77	Sigitas Kavaliauskas	10,89	Andrius Kačėnas	10,89
200 m	Stanislav Michno	21,66	Raimondas Turla	21,84	Dainius Šerpytis	21,87
400 m	Vlareij Petrulevič	47.69	Raimondas Turla	47.76	Stanislav Michno	48.68
800 m	Mindaugas Norbutas	1:48.72	Andrius Masiulionis	1:49.88	Viktoras Mauricas	1:50.49
1 500 m	Darius Gruzdys	3:55.85	Egidijus Rupšys	3:55.85	Mindaugas Kidulaitis	3:49.39
5 000 m	Egidijus Rupšys	15:08.94	Tomas Venckūnas	15:15.91	Kęstutis Bartkėnas	15:18.49
110 m hurdles	Saulius Vyšniauskas	14,45	Rolandas Stanionis	15,02	Giedrius Mačėnas	15,02
400 m hurdles	Artūras Marčenko	53,00	Andrius Krištopaitis	53,96	Ridas Karaška	54,04
3 000 m steeplechase	Mindaugas Pukštas	9:09.13	Karolis Levickis	9:17.78	Mindaugas Tomanas	9:31.69
4 × 100 m	Vilnius's team Eugenijus Libenka; Andrej Levšunov; Vaidas Krivičius; Marijus Gendrėnas	41,96	Kaunas's team Andrius Karnašnikovas; Rolandas Stanionis; Saulius Vyšniauskas; Tadas Daukšas	42,69	Klaipėda's team Mantas Semčenko; Donatas Rauktys; Gediminas Butenis; Ilja Andrusenko	42,77
4 × 400 m	Vilnius's team Andrius Krištopaitis; Andrius Masilionis; Marius Motusas; Paulius Jokubauskas	3:18.43	Klaipėda's team Gediminas Butenis; Viktoras Mauricas; Darius Gruzdys; Žydrūnas Mažrimas	3:20.91	Šiauliai's team Andrius Kazilionis; Tomas Rogožonskas; Jonas Spudis; Mindaugas Butkus	3:23.80
20 km walk	Daugvinas Zujus	1:28:41	Linas Bubnelis	1:29:43	Andrius Tamulevičius	1:40:15
High Jump	Aurelijus Eirošius	2,18	Mantas Šaulys	2,05	Modestas Žukauskas	2,0
Pole Vault	Vytautas Žukaitis	4,10	Jonas Spudis	4,00	Darius Laurinčikas	3,80
Long Jump	Marijus Gendrėnas	7,50	Valentin Linik	7,39	Evaldas Kavaliauskas	7,19
Triple Jump	Ardydas Nazarovas	16,53	Audrius Raizgys	15,97	Andrius Gricevičius	15,15
Shot Put	Gintautas Degutis	17,49	Vytas Druktenis	17,09	Tomas Keinys	15,29
Discus Throw	Virgilijus Alekna	64,16	Romas Ubartas	52,60	Ernestas Filatovas	48,80
Hammer Throw	Žydrūnas Vasiliauskas	59,30	Edgaras Brinkis	58,20	Edvardas Virvilas	51,80
Javelin Throw	Arūnas Jurkšas	73,90	Tomas Intas	68,64	Aleksandras Kozlovas	63,05
Decathlon	Gvidas Vorotinskas	7029	Regimantas Kičas	6424	Mantas Dilys	622

== Women ==
Event	1st place		2nd place		3rd place	
100 m	Agnė Visockaitė	11,48	Audra Dagelytė	11,87	Ernesta Karaškienė	11,98
200 m	Audra Dagelytė	24,30	Edita Lingytė	24,50	Jolanta Kirejeva	24,88
400 m	Inesa Kliukoitytė	55,62	Kristina Osipova	56,72	Jūratė Kudirkaitė	57,32
800 m	Rasa Drazdauskaitė	2:04.33	Jūratė Kudirkaitė	2:05.08	Diana Baliutytė	2:09.65
1 500 m	Rasa Drazdauskaitė	4:23.83	Justina Zavackaitė	4:47.16	Erika Navickytė	4:47.23
5 000 m	Inga Juodeškienė	16:29.44	Laima Šerelytė	18:19.89	Aleksandra Šarkova	18:52.19
100 m hurdles	Erika Karaškienė	13,97	Viktorija Žemaitytė	15,05	Diana Radavičienė	15,35
400 m hurdles	Kristina Osipova	1:01.97	Aurelija Venskaitytė	1:04.01	Lina Liutkutė	1:05.15
2 000 m steeplechase	Odeta Šidlauskaitė	6:49.62	Ieva Bičkutė	7:31.45	Edita Gontytė	8:05.84
4 × 100 m	Kaunas's team Adrija Grocienė; Aidana Lygnugarytė; Edita Lingytė; Ernesta Karaškienė	47,64	Vilnius's team Akvilė Buitkutė; Jolanta Kirejeva; Žana Minina; Irma Matijošiūtė	47,91	Naujoji Akmenė's team Raimonda Bajorūnaitė; Inesa Rimkevičiūtė; Marina Sugak; Audra Dagelytė	49,38
4 × 400 m	Kaunas's team Aurelija Venskaitytė; Jūratė Kudirkaitė; Lina Liutkutė; Inga Kairytė	3:55.82	Vilnius's team Aleksandra Šarkova; Anžela Maslovskaja; Jekaterina Šakovič; Kristina Osipova	3:58.17	Utena's team Inga Kaušylaitė; Inga Raslanaitė; Sandra Rasikaitė; Viktorija Žemčiugova	4:01.03
20 km walk	Kristina Saltanovič	1:32:49	Sonata Milušausakitė	1:38:54	Laura Sukockytė	1:56:03
High Jump	Nelė Žilinskienė	1,87	Karina Vnukova	1,78	Austra Skujytė	1,75
Pole Vault	Rita Snarskaitė	3,41	Edita Grigelionytė	3,20	Rita Andriukaitytė	2,60
Long Jump	Adrija Grocienė	6,26	Živilė Šikšnelytė	6,25	Virginija Petkevičienė	6,14
Triple Jump	Virginija Petkevičienė	13,73	Adrija Grocienė	13,28	Živilė Žebarauskaitė	12,99
Shot Put	Austra Skujytė	16,20	Agnė Pacevičiūtė	13,10	Valda Morkūnienė	12,80
Discus Throw	Viktorija Patapova	46,08	Zinaida Sendriūtė	43,66	Inga Timošenko	41,02
Hammer Throw	Lina Skladaitytė	45,80	Renata Macytė	42,36	Lina Kraskauskaitė	42,24
Javelin Throw	Indrė Jakubaitytė	52,20	Rita Ramanauskaitė	49,55	Dacė Juršienė	44,40
Heptathlon	Remigija Nazarovienė	6005	Rita Grunskytė	4768	Enrika Baliutavičiūtė	4737

== Medals by city ==
Pl.	City	Gold medal	Silver medal	Bronze medal	Total
1	Kaunas	19	16	13	48
2	Vilnius	13	13	8	34
3	Šiauliai	3	2	5	10
4	Klaipėda	2	2	5	9
5	Švenčionys	1	2	1	4
6	Naujoji Akmenė	1	1	1	3
6	Birštonas	1	1	1	3
8	Kelmė	1	0	1	2
9	Marijampolė	1	0	0	1
10	Panevėžys	0	3	2	5
11	Vilkaviškis	0	1	0	1
11	Skuodas	0	1	0	1
13	Pasvalys	0	0	1	1
13	Druskininkai	0	0	1	1
13	Plungė	0	0	1	1
13	Utena	0	0	1	1
13	Rokiškis	0	0	1	1
