= 2007 European Athletics U23 Championships – Women's 10,000 metres =

The women's 10,000 metres event at the 2007 European Athletics U23 Championships was held in Debrecen, Hungary, at Gyulai István Atlétikai Stadion on 13 July.

== Medalists ==
Gold	Volha Minina; Belarus
Silver	Irina Sergeyeva; Russia
Bronze	Alina Alekseyeva; Russia

== Results ==
=== Final ===
13 July

Rank	Name	Nationality	Time	Notes
1st place, gold medalist(s)	Volha Minina	Belarus	33:06.37	
2nd place, silver medalist(s)	Irina Sergeyeva	Russia	33:08.69	
3rd place, bronze medalist(s)	Alina Alekseyeva	Russia	33:09.63	
4	Paula Todoran	Romania	33:12.08	
5	María Sánchez	Spain	34:04.90	
6	Tatyana Shipitsyna	Russia	34:11.80	
7	Zsófia Erdélyi	Hungary	34:38.49	
8	Marta Wojtkuńska	Poland	34:42.64	
9	Remalda Kergytė	Lithuania	34:52.01	
10	Katarína Berešová	Slovakia	34:56.91	
11	Anissa Badis	Hungary	35:44.32	
12	Anna Holm Jørgensen	Denmark	36:25.66	
13	María Carmen Ledesma	Spain	36:53.93	
	Eleni Nikolopoulou	Greece	DNS	

== Participation ==
According to an unofficial count, 13 athletes from 9 countries participated in the event.

- Belarus (1)
- Denmark (1)
- Hungary (2)
- Lithuania (1)
- Poland (1)
- Romania (1)
- Russia (3)
- Slovakia (1)
- Spain (2)
