= 2021 Lithuanian Athletics Championships =

- Dates: 25–26 June
- Host city: Palanga, Lithuania
- Venue: Palangos centrinis stadionas
- Level: Senior
- Type: Outdoor

The 2021 Lithuanian Athletics Championships was the 98th edition of the national championship in outdoor track and field for athletes in Lithuania. It was held between 25 and 26 June at the Palangos centrinis stadionas in Palanga.

== Results ==
=== Men ===
Event	Gold		Silver		Bronze	
100 metres	Kristupas Seikauskas	10.68	Giedrius Rupeika	10.85	Kostas Skrabulis	10.88
200 metres	Gediminas Truskauskas	20.71	Tomas Keršulis	21.00	Kristupas Seikauskas	21.75
400 metres	Tomas Keršulis	47.79	Dariuš Križanovskij	49.24	Einius Trumpa	49.50
800 metres	Eduardas Rimas Survilas	1:51.36	Mindaugas Striokas	1:52.16	Arnas Gabrėnas	1:52.78
1500 metres	Simas Bertašius	3:40.14	Robertas Vališauskas	3:55.53	Justinas Laurinaitis	4:05.60
5000 metres	Egidijus Adomkaitis	14:49.93	Lukas Tarasevičius	14:57.29	Rimvydas Alminas	15:30.16
10,000 metres	Ignas Brasevičius	30:50.36	Remigijus Šnioka	32:29.68	Aurimas Rimkus	32:47.41
110 metres hurdles	Rokas Ickys	14.10	Martynas Vrašinskas	14.32	Edgaras Benkunskas	14.39
400 metres hurdles	Martynas Vrašinskas	56.28	Rytis Ašmena	57.02	Ignas Dailidėnas	57.62
3000 metres steeplechase	Giedrius Valinčius	8:59.67	Lukas Tarasevičius	9:13.55	Jonas Beleška	9:49.19
High jump	Adrijus Glebauskas	2.29	Augustas Bukauskas	2.10	Dainius Pazdrazdis	2.05
Pole vault	Osvaldas Gedrimas	4.90	Tomas Sabašinskas	4.40	Matas Adamonis	4.30
Long jump	Tomas Lotužis	7.45	Ramūnas Kleinauskas	7.34	Algirdas Strelčiūnas	7.19
Triple jump	Paulius Svarauskas	15.68	Tomas Lotužis	15.35	Gustas Griška	15.23
Shot put	Šarūnas Banevičius	16.92	Vytenis Ivaškevičius	15.95	Naubartas Stripeikis	15.63
Discus throw	Andrius Gudžius	67.21	Mykolas Alekna	63.52	Martynas Alekna	58.26
Hammer throw	Tomas Vasiliauskas	66.19	Gustas Pritulskis	56.54	Vytenis Giedraitis	52.89
Javelin throw	Edis Matusevičius	83.53	Tomas Sabašinskas	68.97	Skirmantas Šimoliūnas	68.02
4 × 100 metres relay	Gabrielius Bžeskis; Einius Trumpa; Domas Gailevičius; Kristupas Seikauskas	42.13	Rokas Ickys; Dominykas Urbonas; Markas Juškys; Airidas Zabaras	43.80	Nikodemas Navickas; Marius Valaitis; Rolandas Tichonovičius; Darius Valaitis	44.66

=== Women ===
Event	Gold		Silver		Bronze	
100 metres	Akvilė Andriukaitytė	11.68	Eva Misiūnaitė	11.71	Andrė Ožechauskaitė	11.77
200 metres	Akvilė Andriukaitytė	23.74	Eva Misiūnaitė	24.17	Lukrecija Sabaitytė	24.35
400 metres	Agnė Šerkšnienė	52.86	Erika Krūminaitė	56.30	Gabija Galvydytė	56.59
800 metres	Gabija Galvydytė	2:09.37	Eglė Vaitulevičiūtė	2:13.78	Augustė Žikaitė	2:17.50
1500 metres	Viktorija Varnagirytė	4:37.73	Vytautė Budavičienė	4:48.48	Meda Gasickaitė	4:49.31
5000 metres	Viktorija Varnagirytė	17:20.75	Aistė Labanauskaitė	19:00.43	Raimonda Kubiliūtė	19:11.95
10,000 metres	Diana Lobačevskė	35:01.13	Gitana Akmanavičiūtė	38:11.63	Aušra Garunkšnytė	42:40.46
100 metres hurdles	Beatričė Juškevičiūtė	14.01	Gabija Klimukaitė	14.43	Neda Lasickaitė	14.67
400 metres hurdles	Modesta Justė Morauskaitė	57.67	Kamilė Gargasaitė	1:03.73	Hanna Zikejeva	1:03.96
High jump	Airinė Palšytė	1.93	Urtė Baikštytė	1.85	Satera Balčaitytė	1.75
Pole vault	Akvilė Gedminaitė	3.40	Elzė Kudulytė	3.10	Ugnė Liubinaitė	3.10
Long jump	Jogailė Petrokaitė	6.28	Atėnė Šliževičiūtė	5.76	Austė Macijauskaitė	5.68
Triple jump	Dovilė Kilty	13.89	Diana Zagainova	13.62	Vaida Padimanskaitė	13.25
Shot put	Ieva Zarankaitė	15.47	Urtė Bačianskaitė	14.52	Marija Šyvytė	13.80
Discus throw	Ieva Zarankaitė	62.08	Zinaida Sendriūtė	59.51	Paulina Stuglytė	48.91
Hammer throw	Agnė Lukoševičiūtė	61.56	Mairita Pajedaitė	48.21	Gedmintė Mykolaitytė	41.25
Javelin throw	Liveta Jasiūnaitė	60.79	Kamilė Kunickaitė	44.94	Gustina Steponaitė	40.24
4 × 100 metres relay	Elzė Kudulytė; Neda Lasickaitė; Elena Jasaitė; Kotryna Uzialaitė	49.18	Satera Balčaitytė; Kornelija Staponaitė; Ema Broškaitė; Lurda Tučkutė	49.70	Gerda Kirkytė; Marija Fausta Rimkevičiūtė; Emilė Čepaitė; Ema Rupšytė	50.03
