= Natalija Piliušina =

Lithuanian athletics competitor (born 1990)

Natalja Piliušina
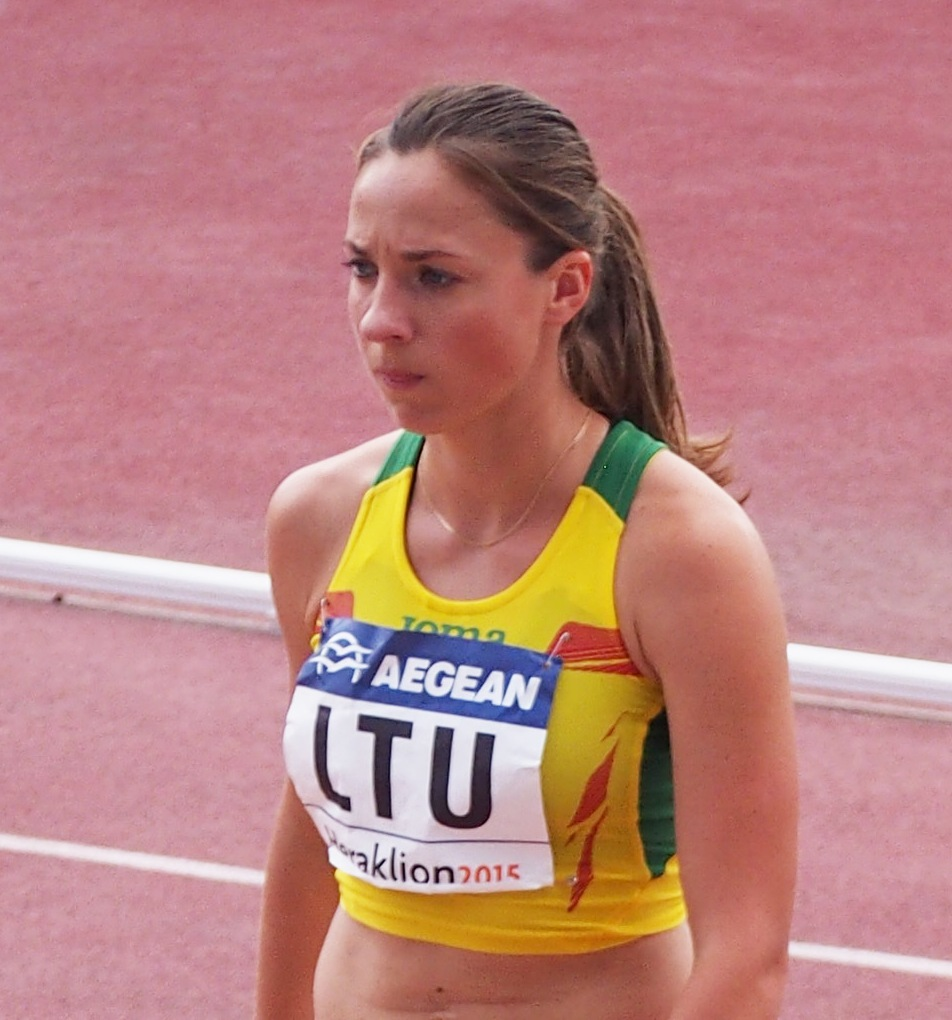
- Natalija Piliušina at 2015 European Team Championships First League

Personal information
- Nationality: Lithuanian
- Born: 22 October 1990 (age 35) Klaipėda, Lithuania
- Height: 5 ft 7 in (1.70 m)
- Weight: 139 lb (63 kg)

Sport
- Sport: Track, long-distance running
- Event(s): 1500 meters, mile
- College team: Oklahoma State
- Club: Brooks Beast Seattle
- Turned pro: 2015

Achievements and titles
- Personal best(s): 800 meters: 2:01.93; 1500 meters: 4:09.51; Mile: 4:32.67
Medal record
Representing Lithuania
Lithuanian Athletics Championships
Gold medal – first place	2006 Lithuanian Athletics Championships	400 m hurdles
Gold medal – first place	2007 Lithuanian Athletics Championships	400 m hurdles
Silver medal – second place	2008 Lithuanian Athletics Championships	1500 m
Silver medal – second place	2008 Lithuanian Athletics Championships	800 m
Silver medal – second place	2010 Lithuanian Athletics Championships	800 m
Silver medal – second place	2017 Lithuanian Athletics Championships	800 m
European Team Championships
Silver medal – second place	2015 European Team Championships	1500 m
Silver medal – second place	2017 European Team Championships	1500 m
- Updated on 10-2–18

Natalija Piliušina (born 1990) is an eight time NCAA All-American, 2013 1500 NCAA champion, and Lithuania record holder and fastest miler in Baltic history. Natalija was the '14-'15 Oklahoma State University athlete of the year.
