= Lina Andrijauskaitė =

Lithuanian long jumper (born 1987)

Medal record

Women's athletics

Representing Lithuania

European Athletics U23 Championships
Bronze medal – third place	2009 Kaunas	4×100 metres

Lithuanian Championships
Gold medal – first place	2008 Kaunas	Long jump
Gold medal – first place	2009 Kaunas	Long jump
Gold medal – first place	2010 Kaunas	Long jump

Lina Andrijauskaitė (born 29 May 1987) is a track and field various events athlete who competes internationally for Lithuania.

In 2010, she represented Lithuania in 2010 European Athletics Championships.
