= Agnė Šerkšnienė =

Lithuanian sprinter

Personal information
- Nationality: Lithuanian
- Born: 18 February 1988 (age 38) Kaunas, Lithuanian SSR, Soviet Union
- Education: Kaunas University of Technology
- Height: 1.73 m (5 ft 8 in)

Sport
- Country: Lithuania
- Sport: Track and field
- Event: 400m 200m
- Club: LC Zürich
- Coached by: Flavio Zberg

Achievements and titles
- Personal bests: Outdoor: 50.99 NR 22.99 NR; Indoor: 52.12 NR

Agnė Šerkšnienė (Orlauskaitė) (born 18 February 1988) is a retired Lithuanian sprinter who specialised in the 400 metres. She was a multiple-time Lithuanian national champion, and took part in 2020 Olympic Games.

== Career ==
She missed the 2012 Olympic Games qualifying standard by just 0.11 seconds, however in the following season she reached the semi-finals of the 2013 World Athletics Championships.

In 2014, she competed at the 2014 European Athletics Championships, where she ran 52.32 seconds in the individual women's 400 metres event. She also placed 11th with the Lithuanian women’s team in 4 × 400 metres relay at the championships, as they ran a time of 3:36.25. In 2014 however she suffered a serious injury which ruled her out of competition for a lengthy period, and decided to start a family with her husband.

In February 2018, she broke the nine-day old national indoor record set by Modesta Justė Morauskaitė running 52.93 seconds in Switzerland.

She competed for Lithuania in the 400 metres at the delayed 2020 Olympic Games, held in Tokyo, Japan in 2021.

In September 2022, she announced about her retirement from professional sport at the age of 34 years-old with her final race being in Switzerland. She was honoured with a special prize during the Lithuanian Athletics Federation's festive evening held in Palanga in early January 2023.

== Personal life ==
She was educated at Kaunas Pilėnai Secondary School and graduated in economics in 2011 from Kaunas University of Technology. Her hobbies include playing the piano and swimming. She married Andrius Šerkšnas with whom she had a daughter, Audra, born in 2015. They moved to Switzerland in 2011 where he was employed by the Formula 1 team Alfa Romeo.

== Achievements ==
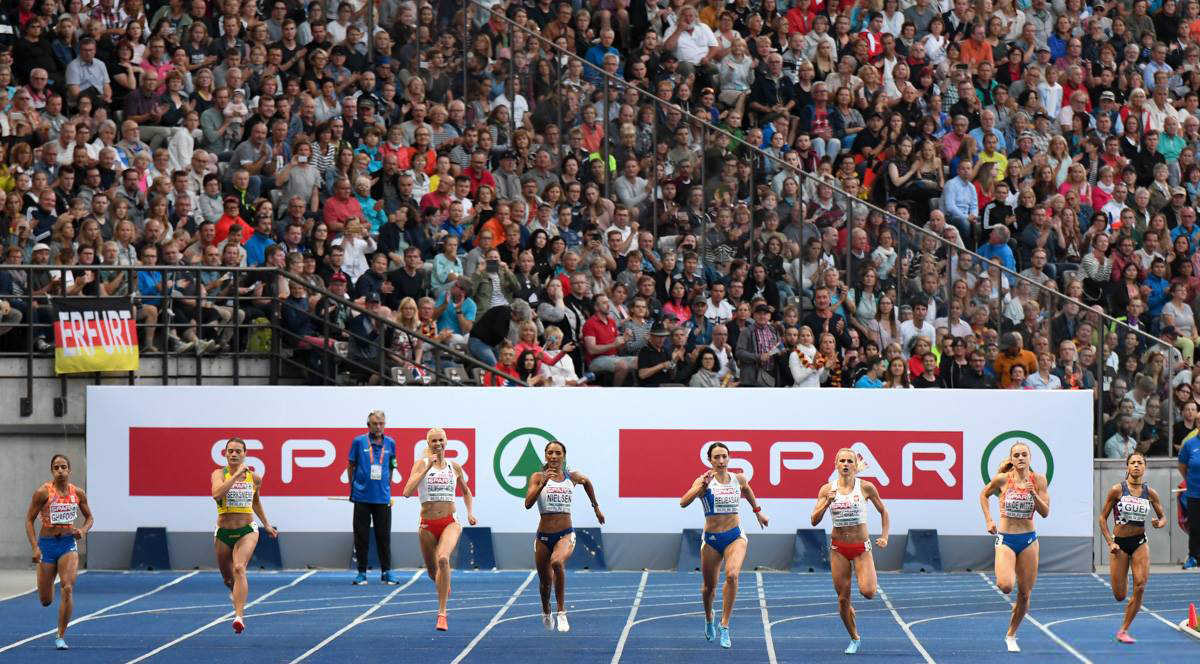
2018 European Athletics Championships

Year	Competition	Venue	Position	Notes
Representing Lithuania
2005	EYOF	Lignano, Italy	5	55.66
2007	Lithuanian Indoor Athletics Championships	Kaunas, Lithuania	1	56.60
2007	European U20 Championships	Hengelo, Netherlands	6	54.00
2008	Lithuanian Athletics Championships	Kaunas, Lithuania	1	53.56
2009	Lithuanian Indoor Athletics Championships	Kaunas, Lithuania	1	57.27
2009	European Indoor Championships	Turin, Italy	6	3:43.42
2009	Lithuanian Athletics Championships	Kaunas, Lithuania	1	54.17
2009	European U23 Championships	Kaunas, Lithuania	5	52.81
2009	European U23 Championships	Kaunas, Lithuania	9	3:40.69
2010	Lithuanian Indoor Athletics Championships	Klaipėda, Lithuania	1	56.30
2011	Lithuanian Athletics Championships	Kaunas, Lithuania	1	53.92
2011	Universiade	Shenzhen, China	17	54.51
2012	Lithuanian Athletics Championships	Kaunas, Lithuania	1	52.56
2012	Lithuanian Athletics Championships	Kaunas, Lithuania	1	23.63
2012	European Championships	Helsinki, Finland	14	53.07
2013	Lithuanian Athletics Championships	Šiauliai, Lithuania	1	52.63
2013	World Championships	Moscow, Russia	23	52.48
2014	European Championships	Zurich, Switzerland	9	52.32
2014	European Championships	Zurich, Switzerland	11	3:36.25
2018	World Athletics Indoor Championships	Birmingham, United Kingdom	7	52.62
2018	Lithuanian Athletics Championships	Palanga, Lithuania	1	52.03
2018	European Championships	Berlin, Germany	6	51.42
2019	European Indoor Championships	Glasgow, United Kingdom	4	52.40
2020	Lithuanian Athletics Championships	Palanga, Lithuania	1	52.29
2020	Lithuanian Athletics Championships	Palanga, Lithuania	1	23.43
2021	European Indoor Championships	Toruń, Poland	11	53.09
2021	Lithuanian Athletics Championships	Palanga, Lithuania	1	52.86
2021	2020 Olympic Games	Tokyo, Japan	33	52.78
2022	Lithuanian Athletics Championships	Šiauliai, Lithuania	1	54.66
