= Irina Krakoviak-Tolstika =

Lithuanian middle-distance runner (born 1977)

Medal record

Women's athletics

Representing Lithuania

European U23 Championships
Silver medal – second place	1999 Göteborg	800 metres

Lithuanian Championships
Gold medal – first place	2000 Kaunas	1500 metres
Gold medal – first place	2001 Kaunas	800 metres
Gold medal – first place	2001 Kaunas	1500 metres
Gold medal – first place	2009 Kaunas	800 metres
Gold medal – first place	2009 Kaunas	1500 metres

Irina Krakoviak-Tolstika (born 16 November 1977) is a former track and field middle distance runner who competed internationally for Lithuania.

In the 2000 Olympics she made her Olympic debut, where in 1500 metres distance she reached semi-final. In 2009, she competed in World Championships 1500 metres distance, where she reached semifinal running. in 800 metres distance she failed to reach semi final.

== Personal records ==
- Outdoor
  - 800 m – 2:00.71 (2009)
  - 1000 m - 2:40.48 (2005)
  - 1500 m - 4:03.19 (2005)
- Indoor
  - 800 m - 2:03.77 (2000)
  - 1000 m - 2:38.77 (2006)
  - 1500 m - 4:10.74 (2006)
