= Arūnas Jurkšas =

Lithuanian javelin thrower (born 1972)

Personal information
- Nationality: Lithuanian
- Born: 3 May 1972 (age 54) Jurbarkas, Lithuanian SSR, Soviet Union

Sport
- Sport: Athletics
- Event: Javelin throw

Arūnas Jurkšas (born 3 May 1972) is a Lithuanian athlete. He competed in the men's javelin throw at the 2000 Summer Olympics.
