= Lithuanian Athletics Championships =

National athletics competition

Lithuanian Athletics Championships (Lithuanian: Lietuvos lengvosios atletikos čempionatas) is the national championship in athletics, organized by the Lithuanian Athletics Federation. The first competition was held in 1921. Women participated since the 1922 championship.

== Championships ==
The championships were not held in 1925, 1940 and 1944.

Edition	Year	Host city	Venue	Ref.
1921: Only for Men
1	1921	Kaunas		
Since 1922: Men and Women
2	1922	Kaunas		
3	1923	Kaunas		
4	1924	Kaunas		
–	1925	Not held		(Note: Not held due to organizational issues.)
5	1926	Kaunas	Darius and Girėnas Stadium	
6	1927	Klaipėda		
7	1928	Kaunas	Darius and Girėnas Stadium	
8	1929	Klaipėda		
9	1930	Kaunas	Darius and Girėnas Stadium	
10	1931	Kaunas	Darius and Girėnas Stadium	
11	1932	Klaipėda		
12	1933	Kaunas	Darius and Girėnas Stadium	
13	1934	Klaipėda		
14	1935	Kaunas	Darius and Girėnas Stadium	
15	1936	Klaipėda		
16	1937	Kaunas	Darius and Girėnas Stadium	
17	1938	Kaunas	Darius and Girėnas Stadium	
18	1939	Kaunas	Darius and Girėnas Stadium	
–	1940	Not held		(Note: Not held due to World War II.)
19	1941	Kaunas	Darius and Girėnas Stadium	
20	1942	Kaunas	Darius and Girėnas Stadium	
21	1943	Kaunas	Darius and Girėnas Stadium	
–	1944	Not held		(Note: Not held due to World War II.)
22	1945	Kaunas	Darius and Girėnas Stadium	
23	1946	Kaunas	Darius and Girėnas Stadium	
24	1947	Kaunas	Darius and Girėnas Stadium	
25	1948	Vilnius	Žalgiris Stadium	
26	1949	Vilnius	Žalgiris Stadium	
27	1950	Vilnius	Žalgiris Stadium	
28	1951	Vilnius	Žalgiris Stadium	
29	1952	Vilnius	Žalgiris Stadium	
30	1953	Klaipėda		
31	1954	Vilnius	Žalgiris Stadium	
32	1955	Vilnius	Žalgiris Stadium	
33	1956	Vilnius	Žalgiris Stadium	
34	1957	Vilnius	Žalgiris Stadium	
35	1958	Vilnius	Žalgiris Stadium	
36	1959	Vilnius	Žalgiris Stadium	
37	1960	Vilnius	Žalgiris Stadium	
38	1961	Vilnius	Žalgiris Stadium	
39	1962	Vilnius	Žalgiris Stadium	
40	1963	Vilnius	Žalgiris Stadium	
41	1964	Vilnius	Žalgiris Stadium	
42	1965	Vilnius	Žalgiris Stadium	
43	1966	Panevėžys		
44	1967	Panevėžys		
45	1968	Vilnius	Vingis Park Stadium	
46	1969	Vilnius	Žalgiris Stadium	
47	1970	Vilnius	Žalgiris Stadium	
48	1971	Vilnius	Žalgiris Stadium	
49	1972	Vilnius	Žalgiris Stadium	
50	1973	Vilnius	Žalgiris Stadium	
51	1974	Vilnius	Žalgiris Stadium	
52	1975	Vilnius	Žalgiris Stadium	
53	1976	Vilnius	Žalgiris Stadium	
54	1977	Kaunas	Darius and Girėnas Stadium	
55	1978	Vilnius	Žalgiris Stadium	
56	1979	Vilnius	Žalgiris Stadium	
57	1980	Vilnius	Žalgiris Stadium	
58	1981	Vilnius	Žalgiris Stadium	
59	1982	Vilnius	Žalgiris Stadium	
60	1983	Vilnius	Žalgiris Stadium	
61	1984	Klaipėda		
62	1985	Vilnius	Žalgiris Stadium	
63	1986	Kaunas	Darius and Girėnas Stadium	
64	1987	Vilnius	Žalgiris Stadium	
65	1988	Vilnius	Žalgiris Stadium	
66	1989	Vilnius	Žalgiris Stadium	
67	1990	Vilnius	Žalgiris Stadium	
68	1991	Vilnius	Žalgiris Stadium	
69	1992	Vilnius	Žalgiris Stadium	
70	1993	Vilnius	Žalgiris Stadium	
71	1994	Vilnius	Žalgiris Stadium	
72	1995	Vilnius	Žalgiris Stadium	
73	1996	Vilnius	Žalgiris Stadium	
74	1997	Kaunas	Darius and Girėnas Stadium	
75	1998	Kaunas	Darius and Girėnas Stadium	
76	1999	Kaunas	Darius and Girėnas Stadium	
77	2000	Kaunas	Darius and Girėnas Stadium	
78	2001	Kaunas	Darius and Girėnas Stadium	
79	2002	Kaunas	Darius and Girėnas Stadium	
80	2003	Kaunas	Darius and Girėnas Stadium	
81	2004	Kaunas	Darius and Girėnas Stadium	
82	2005	Kaunas	Darius and Girėnas Stadium	
83	2006	Kaunas	Darius and Girėnas Stadium	
84	2007	Kaunas	Darius and Girėnas Stadium	
85	2008	Kaunas	Darius and Girėnas Stadium	
86	2009	Kaunas	Darius and Girėnas Stadium	
87	2010	Kaunas	Darius and Girėnas Stadium	
88	2011	Kaunas	Darius and Girėnas Stadium	
89	2012	Kaunas	Darius and Girėnas Stadium	
90	2013	Šiauliai	Savivaldybė Stadium	
91	2014	Kaunas	Darius and Girėnas Stadium	
92	2015	Palanga	Palanga Stadium	
93	2016	Palanga	Palanga Stadium	
94	2017	Palanga	Palanga Stadium	
95	2018	Palanga	Palanga Stadium	
96	2019	Palanga	Palanga Stadium	
97	2020	Palanga	Palanga Stadium	
98	2021	Palanga	Palanga Stadium	
99	2022	Šiauliai	Savivaldybė Stadium	
100	2023	Palanga	Palanga Stadium	
101	2024	Palanga	Palanga Stadium	
102	2025	Palanga	Palanga Stadium	

== Events ==
Men

- 100 m
- 200 m
- 400 m
- 800 m
- 1500 m
- 5000 m
- 10000 m
- 110 m hurdles
- 400 m hurdles
- 3000 m steeplechase
- High Jump
- Pole Vault
- Long Jump
- Triple Jump
- Shot Put
- Discus Throw
- Javelin Throw
- Hammer Throw
- 4 × 100 m
- 4 × 400 m

Women

- 100 m
- 200 m
- 400 m
- 800 m
- 1500 m
- 5000 m
- 10000 m
- 100 m hurdles
- 400 m hurdles
- 3000 m steeplechase
- High Jump
- Pole Vault
- Long Jump
- Triple Jump
- Shot Put
- Discus Throw
- Javelin Throw
- Hammer Throw
- 4 × 100 m
- 4 × 400 m

In past there was 20 km and 20000 m walking, 2000 m steeplechase, 60 metres, decathlon and heptathlon events.

== Championship records ==
Records set since 1921

=== Men ===
Event	Record	Athlete	Date	Championships	Place	Ref.
100 m	10.18		2011		Kaunas	
200 m	20.83 (+2.0 m/s)	Gediminas Truskauskas	8 August 2020	2020 Championships	Palanga	
400 m	46.38	Jonas Motiejūnas	1999		Kaunas	
800 m	1:46.58	Vitalij Kozlov	19 July 2008	2008 Championships	Kaunas	
1500 m	3:43.5	Juzefas Mazurkevičius	1979		Vilnius	
5000 m	13:47.3	Juzefas Mazurkevičius	1979		Vilnius	
10000 m	29:03.4	Anatolijus Baranovas	1971		Vilnius	
110 m hurdles	13.89	Mantas Šilkauskas	2010		Kaunas	
400 m hurdles	50.76	Silvestras Guogis	2012		Kaunas	
3000 m steeplechase	8:38.6 h	Antanas Stančius	1982		Vilnius	
High jump	2.26 m	Raivydas Stanys	2011 and 2014		Kaunas	
Pole vault	5.40 m	Zigmas Biliūnas	1981		Vilnius	
Long jump	8.11 m	Povilas Mykolaitis	2011		Kaunas	
Triple jump	17.29 m	Audrius Raizgys	1995		Vilnius	
Shot put	20.69 m	Donatas Stukonis	1987		Vilnius	
Discus Throw	73.88 m	Virgilijus Alekna	2000		Kaunas	
Hammer Throw	80.58 m	Benjaminas Viluckis	1986		Kaunas	
Javelin throw	89.17 m	Edis Matusevičius	27 July 2019		Palanga	
Decathlon	8002 pts	Rišardas Malachovskis	1991		Vilnius	
4 × 100 m relay	40.10	National team	2013		Šiauliai	
4 × 400 m relay	3:13.79	Klaipėda City team	2007		Kaunas	

=== Women ===
Event	Record	Athlete	Date	Championships	Place	Ref.
100 m	11.37	Agnė Eggerth	2003		Kaunas	
200 m	23.39	Agnė Eggerth	2004		Kaunas	
400 m	52.50	Dalia Matusevičienė	1989		Vilnius	
800 m	1:58.7	Dalia Matusevičienė	1984		Klaipėda	
1500 m	4:09.1	Regina Čistiakova	1985		Vilnius	
5000 m	16:02.56	Živilė Balčiūnaitė	2005		Kaunas	
10000 m	32:47.47	Živilė Balčiūnaitė	2004		Kaunas	
3000 m steeplechase	10:28.40	Evelina Miltenė	2016		Palanga	
100 m hurdles	13.12	Sonata Tamošaitytė	2011		Kaunas	
400 m hurdles	55.80	Margarita Navickaitė	1989		Vilnius	
High jump	1.98 m	Airinė Palšytė	27 July 2014		Kaunas	
Pole vault	4.10 m	Rugilė Miklyčiūtė	25 June 2022	2022 Championships	Šiauliai	
Long jump	7.01 m	Irena Oženko	1986		Kaunas	
Triple jump	14.18 m (+1.2 m/s)	Dovilė Kilty	8 August 2020	2020 Championships	Palanga	
Shot put	20.12 m	Rima Muzikevičienė	1980		Vilnius	
Discus throw	66.65 m	Galina Murašova	1982		Vilnius	
Hammer throw	52.65 m	Vaida Kelečiūtė	2007		Kaunas	
Javelin throw	62.45 m	Rita Ramanauskaitė	2004		Kaunas	
Heptathlon	6241 pts	Remigija Sablovskaitė	1987		Vilnius	
4 × 100 m relay	44.22	National team	2008		Kaunas	
4 × 400 m relay	3:30.65	Vilnius City team	1992		Vilnius	
