= Darius Draudvila =

Lithuanian athletics competitor (born 1983)

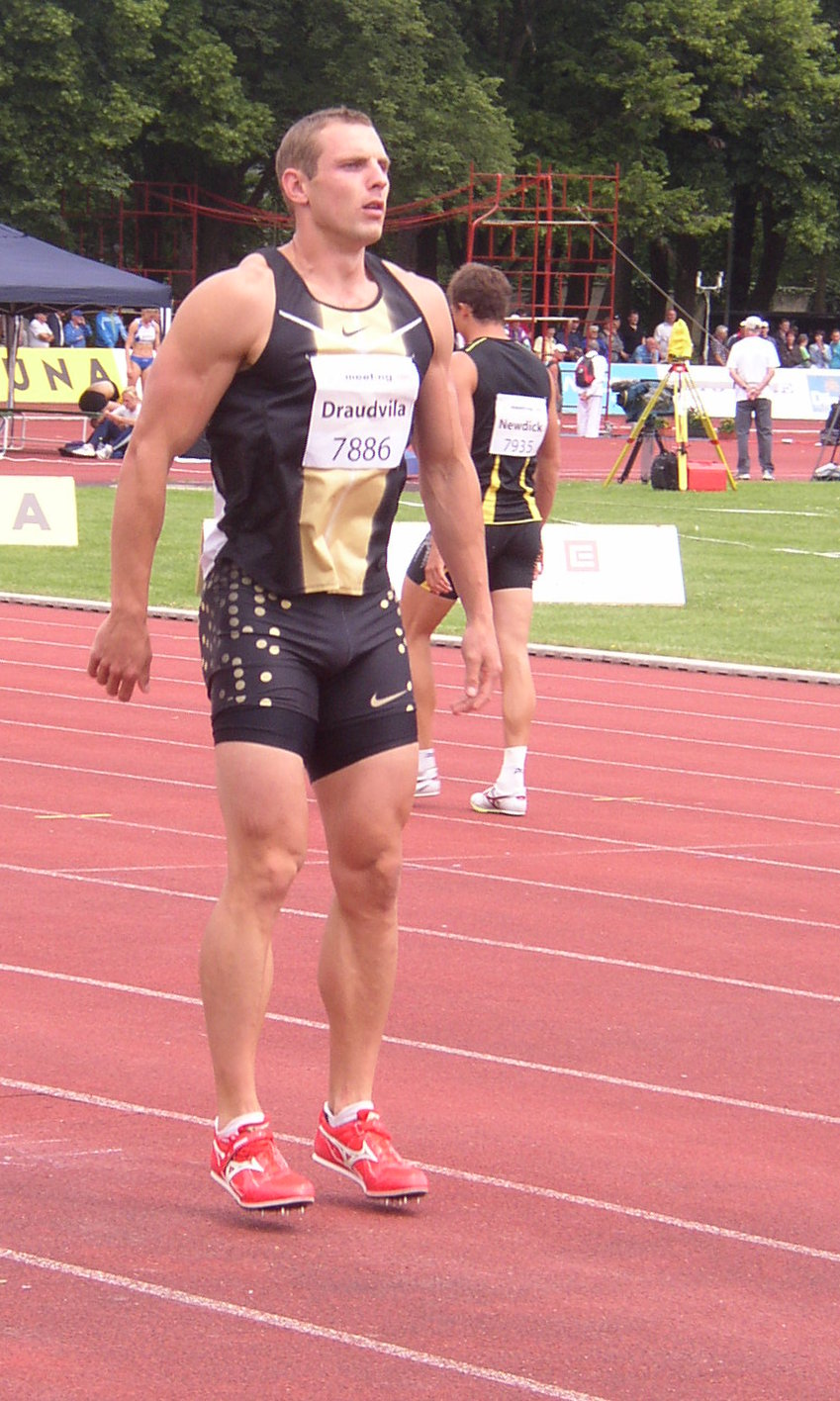

Medal record

Men's Athletics

Representing Lithuania

Lithuanian Athletics Championships
Gold medal – first place	2010 Kaunas	Pole Vault

Darius Draudvila (born 29 March 1983) is a Lithuanian decathlon and heptathlon track and field athlete, who internationally competes for Lithuania, but lives in the United States. During studies in USA, Darius represented Kansas State track & field team and his personal best in decathlon take 4th place in Kansas State team's history. In 2008 Draudvila set a national heptathlon record.

His personal best is 8032 points, which he achieved in 2010 at the European Championships in Barcelona. He also received a nomination for the 2010 World Fair Play Awards as a result of his conduct at the event – he gave his spare pole to Andrei Krauchanka in the vault contest when the Belarusian athlete's equipment had snapped. This enabled Krauchanka to continue in the decathlon, where he went on to take the bronze, while Draudvila ended the competition in sixth place.

Draudvila competed in the International Decathlon at Hexham (GBR) in 2008 and 2010. In 2008 he did not finish the 1500m and the meeting was won by Dean Macey (GBR) in his last decathlon before retiring. In 2010, Draudvila was in great shape and managed to set a meeting record in the 110m hurdles (14.11sec) with a + 5.7m tail wind. He also won the decathlon with 7643 points 199 points below the meeting record set by Macey back in 2004.

== Achievements ==
Year	Competition	Venue	Position	Event	Notes
2002	World Junior Championships	Kingston, Jamaica	6th	Decathlon (junior)	7245 pts
2006	European Championships	Gothenburg, Sweden	DNF	Decathlon	DNF
2010	Lithuanian Championships	Kaunas, Lithuania	1st	Pole vault	4.20 m
2010	European Championships	Barcelona, Spain	6th	Decathlon	8032 pts
2011	European Indoor Championships	Paris, France	14th	Heptathlon	5073 pts
2012	Summer Olympics	London, England	25th	Decathlon	7557 pts
