= Remalda Kergytė-Dauskurdienė =

Lithuanian long-distance runner (born 1985)

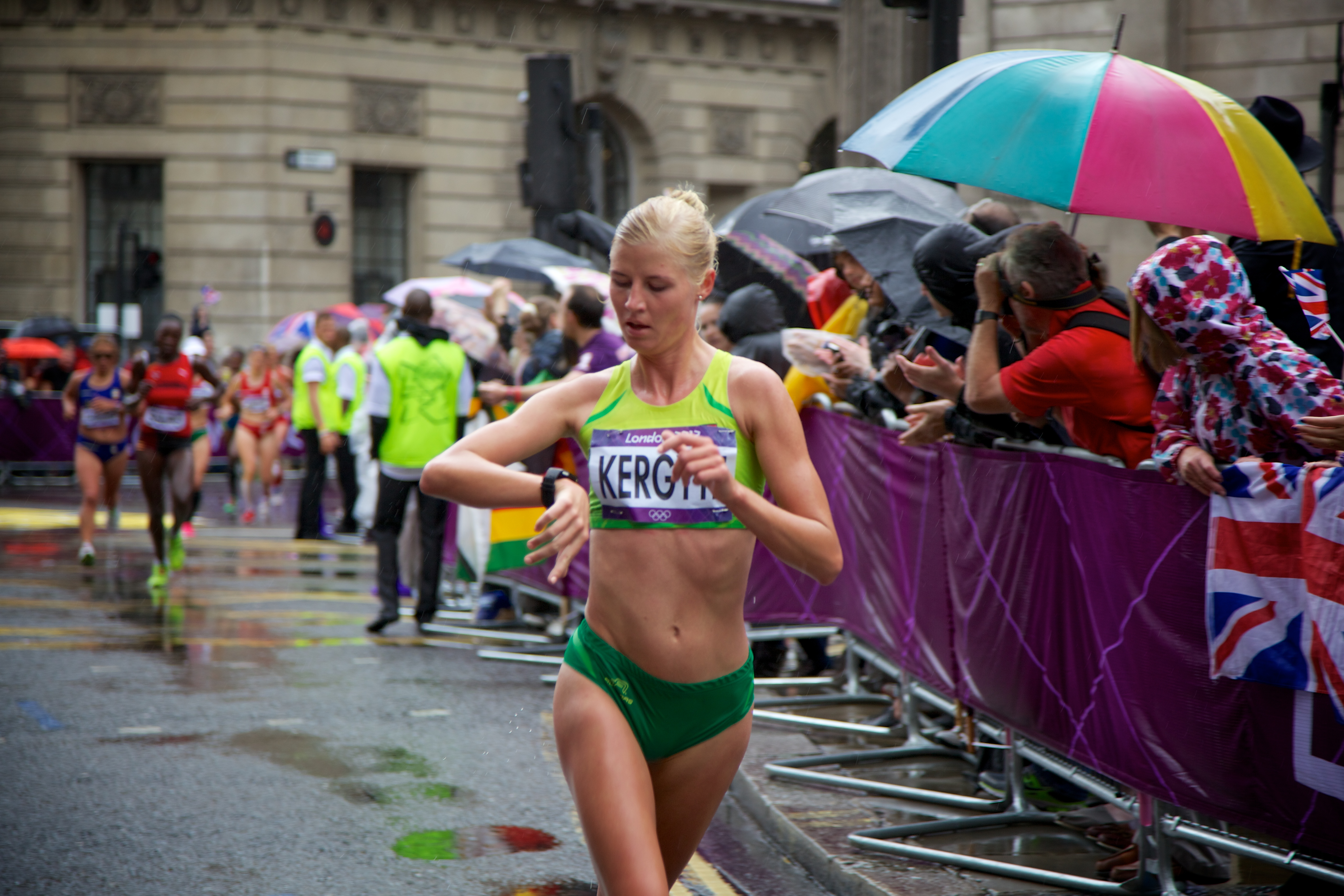

Personal information
- Born: August 25, 1985 (age 40)
- Height: 1.73 m (5 ft 8 in)
- Weight: 56 kg (123 lb)

Sport
- Country: Lithuania
- Sport: Athletics
- Event: Marathon

Remalda Kergytė (born 25 August 1985) is a Lithuanian marathon and half marathon runner. Her marathon personal record is 2:38:48 set at 2008 in Dresden.

She represented Lithuania in 2009 World Championships in Athletics, reaching 52nd place. At the 2013 World Championships, she improved to 30th place.

== Achievements ==
Year	Competition	Venue	Position	Event	Notes
Representing Lithuania
2007	European U23 Championships	Debrecen, Hungary	12th	5000m	17:06.33
2007	European U23 Championships	Debrecen, Hungary	9th	10,000m	34:52.01
2007	Vilnius Marathon	Vilnius, Lithuania	1st	Half Marathon	1:19:13
2008	Lithuanian Athletics Championships	Kaunas, Lithuania	2nd	5000 m	17:25.97
2009	Lithuanian Athletics Championships	Kaunas, Lithuania	3rd	10000 m	35:48.00
2009	Universiade	Belgrade, Serbia	13th	Half marathon	1:20:17
2009	World Championships	Berlin, Germany	52nd	Marathon	2:45:28
2010	European Championships	Barcelona, Spain	34th	Marathon	2:55:12
2013	World Championships	Moscow, Russia	30th	Marathon	2:47:30
2014	European Championships	Zurich, Switzerland	21st	Marathon	2:35:13 PB
