= Mindaugas Norbutas =

Lithuanian middle-distance runner (born 1976)

Personal information
- Full name: Mindaugas Norbutas
- Nationality: Lithuania
- Born: 24 August 1976 (age 49) Vaiguva, Lithuanian SSR, Soviet Union
- Height: 1.83 m (6 ft 0 in)
- Weight: 69 kg (152 lb)

Sport
- Sport: Athletics
- Event: Middle-distance running
- Club: Tutuvenai
- Coached by: Povilas Sabaitis

Achievements and titles
- Personal bests: 800 m: 1:46.64 (2003); 1500 m: 3:49.03 (2008)

Mindaugas Norbutas (born 24 August 1976, in Vaiguva) is a retired Lithuanian middle-distance runner, who specialized in the 800 metres. He represented his nation Lithuania at the 2004 Summer Olympics, and also recorded a national record and a personal best of 1:46.64 in the men's 800 metres upon placing sixth at the 2003 EWE Athletics Cup in Cuxhaven, Germany. Norbutas has also trained throughout his athletic career for Tutuvenai Sport Club in his native Kelmė, under his personal coach Povilas Sabaitis.

Norbutas qualified for the men's 800 metres at the 2004 Summer Olympics in Athens, by registering a B-standard entry time of 1:46.64 from the EWE Athletics Cup in Cuxhaven. He threw down a seasonal best of 1:47.38 in heat two, but faded only to sixth and did not advance further into the semifinals, trailing behind the leader Joseph Mutua of Kenya by almost two seconds.
