= Mantas Šilkauskas =

Lithuanian decathlete (born 1988)

Medal record

Men's athletics

Representing Lithuania

European Team Championships
Silver medal – second place	2011 Novi Sad	110 m hurdles

Mantas Šilkauskas (born 10 April 1988) is a Lithuanian decathlete, who also competed as hurdler. He competes international for Lithuania, but lives in United States.

He finished 23rd in the octathlon at the 2005 World Youth Championships in Athletics in Marrakesh.

Šilkauskas was an All-American jumper for the Kansas State Wildcats track and field team. In 2012, he became the first Kansas State men's long jumper to score at an NCAA outdoor championship since 1988. Domestic fans were disappointed by his absence when he left for the U.S., but he said he didn't regret his decision.

== Achievements ==
Year	Competition	Venue	Position	Event	Notes
Representing Lithuania
2005	World Youth Championships	Marrakesh, Morocco	23rd	Octathlon	5554 pts
2008	Lithuanian Championships	Kaunas, Lithuania	1st	110 m hurdles	14.34
2009	European U23 Championships	Kaunas, Lithuania	—	Decathlon	DNF
2010	Lithuanian Championships	Kaunas, Lithuania	1st	110 m hurdles	13.89
2010	European Championships	Barcelona, Spain	—	110 m hurdles	DSQ
