= Eglė Balčiūnaitė =

Lithuanian middle-distance runner

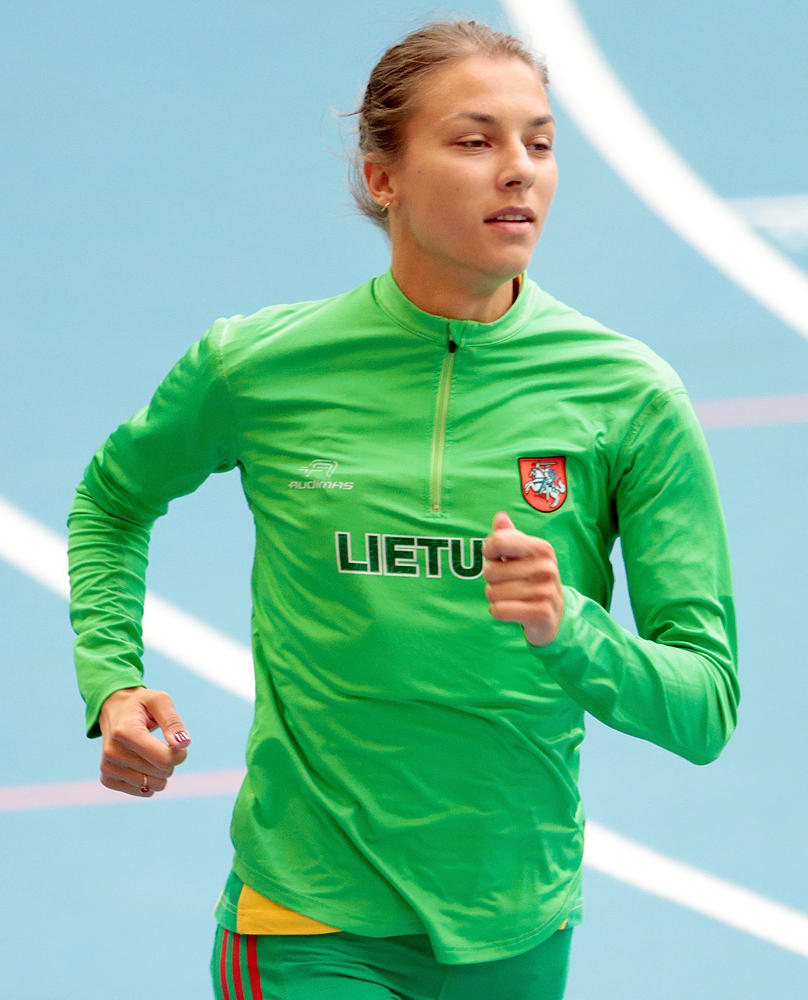
- Eglė Balčiūnaitė at 2013 IAAF World Championships

Personal information
- Nationality: Lithuania
- Born: 31 October 1988 (age 37) Šiauliai, Lithuania

Sport
- Country: Lithuania
- Sport: Running
- Event(s): 400 m, 800 m

Achievements and titles
- Personal best(s): 400 m (indoor): 53.47 (2010); 800 m (indoor): 2:01.37 (2010); 800 m (outdoor): 1:59.29 (2010)
Medal record
Women's athletics
Representing Lithuania
Summer Universiade
Bronze medal – third place	2013 Kazan	800 metres
SELL Student Games
Gold medal – first place	2008 Espoo	800 metres
Gold medal – first place	2009 Jelgava	800 metres
Lithuanian Championships
Gold medal – first place	2010 Kaunas	400 metres
Gold medal – first place	2010 Kaunas	800 metres
Silver medal – second place	2009 Kaunas	800 metres

Eglė Balčiūnaitė (born 31 October 1988 in Šiauliai) is a former track and field middle-distance runner who competed internationally for Lithuania. She competed at the 2008 Olympic Games in Beijing and the 2016 Olympic Games in Rio de Janeiro. In 2010, she became the first Lithuanian track and field athlete to reach the final of the World Athletics Indoor Championships.

== Career ==
Balčiūnaitė defeated her more experienced compatriot Irina Krakoviak in a Lithuanian pre-Olympic selection race and subsequently competed in the 2008 Olympics in 800 metres distance, where she finished in a credible 22nd place, despite being the youngest member of the Lithuanian Olympic team.

She took part in the 2009 European Athletics U23 Championships in Kaunas and placed 6th in the final. She participated in the 2010 IAAF World Indoor Championships where she achieved her personal best and finished fifth in the indoor 800 m discipline in Doha, Qatar), and in doing so, became the first Lithuanian track and field athlete to reach the final of the World Indoor Championships.

In 2011, Balčiūnaitė set the Lithuanian national record for the 800 metres indoor race, running 2:01.23. Her Lithuanian national indoor record for the 400 metres set in 2010 stood for eight years until it was broken by Modesta Justė Morauskaitė running 53.21 seconds in February 2018.

Balčiūnaitė won a bronze medal over 800 metres at the 2013 Summer Universiade in Kazan, Russia.

She represented Lithuania in Rio de Janeiro at the 2016 Olympic Games. She finished 12th overall at the 2017 World Athletics Championships in London.

In January 2023, Balčiūnaitė announced her retirement from professional sport at the age of 34. She was honored with a special prize during a Lithuanian Athletics Federation festive evening held in Palanga in early January 2023.

== Personal life ==
She is from the Šiauliai Pietinis district of Lithuania.

== Personal records ==
- 800 m – 1:59.29 s (2010, outdoor, Monaco Diamond League)
- 800 m – 2:01.23 s (2011, indoor, Germany, national record)
- 400 m – 53.47 s (2010, indoor, Portugal, national record)
