= Silvestras Guogis =

Lithuanian athletics competitor (born 1990)

Silvestras Guogis (born 2 March 1990) is a Lithuanian 400 metres hurdler and sprinter.

He represented Lithuania in 2008 World Junior Championships in Athletics and 2007 World Youth Championships in Athletics without reaching the final.

== Achievements ==
Year	Competition	Venue	Position	Event	Notes
2007	World Youth Championships	Ostrava, Czech Republic	25th (h)	400 m hurdles	54.32
2008	Lithuanian Championships	Kaunas, Lithuania	1st	400 m	48.52
2008	Lithuanian Championships	Kaunas, Lithuania	2nd	400 m hurdles	53.94
2008	World Junior Championships	Bydgoszcz, Poland	22nd (sf)	400m hurdles	53.46
2008	World Junior Championships	Bydgoszcz, Poland	23rd (h)	4 × 400 m relay	3:16.75
2009	Lithuanian Championships	Kaunas, Lithuania	1st	400 m hurdles	52.20
2010	Lithuanian Championships	Kaunas, Lithuania	2nd	400 m	47.46
2010	Lithuanian Championships	Kaunas, Lithuania	1st	400 m hurdles	51.52
2010	European Championships	Barcelona, Spain	26th (h)	400 m hurdles	53.38
2011	Universiade	Shenzhen, China	18th (sf)	400 m hurdles	51.32
