= Austra Skujytė =

Lithuanian athletics competitor (born 1979)

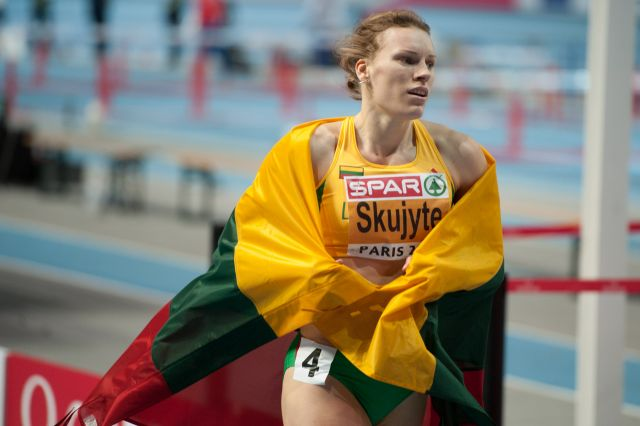
- Skujytė in European Indoor Championships 2011

Personal information
- Born: 12 August 1979 (age 47) Biržai, Lithuanian SSR, Soviet Union
- Height: 1.88 m (6 ft 2 in)
- Weight: 76 kg (168 lb)

Sport
- Country: Lithuania
- Sport: Athletics
- Event: Heptathlon
Medal record
Olympic Games
Silver medal – second place	2004 Athens	Heptathlon
Bronze medal – third place	2012 London	Heptathlon
World Indoor Championships
Bronze medal – third place	2004 Budapest	Pentathlon
Bronze medal – third place	2012 Istanbul	Pentathlon
European Indoor Championships
Silver medal – second place	2011 Paris	Pentathlon
- Updated on 4 August 2012

Austra Skujytė (born 12 August 1979 in Biržai) is a retired Lithuanian athlete, competing in both the heptathlon and the decathlon. On 15 April 2005 in Columbia, Missouri, she broke the women's decathlon world record, with a score of 8358. She is the 2004 Olympic silver medalist and 2012 Olympic bronze medalist in the heptathlon. The latter medal was allocated retrospectively following the disqualification in 2016 of original medalist Tatyana Chernova for historic doping offences.

Her personal best in the 7-event heptathlon of 6599 was set on 4 August at the 2012 Summer Olympics in London. During that competition she set the World Heptathlon Best in the Shot Put at 17.31 m (56 ft 9 1/4 in). She is an eight time national champion in the Shot Put. She has also won National Championships in the Discus, 100 metres hurdles twice and Long jump three times. She retired from athletics in 2017.

Skujytė graduated with a degree in kinesiology from Kansas State University, where she became the first woman at the school to win multiple NCAA championships, capturing titles in the heptathlon in 2001 and 2002. In 2002, she also took second in the NCAA in the shot put competition.

== Achievements ==
Year	Competition	Venue	Position	Event	Notes
Representing Lithuania
1998	World Junior Championships	Annecy, France	6th	Heptathlon	5606 pts
1999	European U23 Championships	Gothenburg, Sweden	6th	Heptathlon	5613 pts
2000	Olympic Games	Sydney, Australia	12th	Heptathlon	6034 pts
2001	European U23 Championships	Amsterdam, Netherlands	3rd	Heptathlon	6087 pts
2002	Lithuanian Championships	Kaunas, Lithuania	3rd	High jump	1.75 m
2002	Lithuanian Championships	Kaunas, Lithuania	1st	Shot put	16.20 m
2003	Hypo-Meeting	Götzis, Austria	2nd	Heptathlon	6213 pts
2003	World Championships	Paris, France	10th	Heptathlon	6077 pts
2004	World Indoor Championships	Budapest, Hungary	3rd	Pentathlon	4679 pts
2004	Hypo-Meeting	Götzis, Austria	7th	Heptathlon	6233 pts
2004	Olympic Games	Athens, Greece	2nd	Heptathlon	6435 pts
2005	Hypo-Meeting	Götzis, Austria	5th	Heptathlon	6386 pts
2005	World Championships	Helsinki, Finland	4th	Heptathlon	6360 pts
2007	Hypo-Meeting	Götzis, Austria	5th	Heptathlon	6277 pts
2007	World Championships	Osaka, Japan	6th	Heptathlon	6380 pts
2008	World Indoor Championships	Valencia, Spain	5th	Pentathlon	4655 pts
2008	Hypo-Meeting	Götzis, Austria	10th	Heptathlon	6235 pts
2008	Olympic Games	Beijing, China	—	Heptathlon	DNF
2009	World Championships	Berlin, Germany	17th	Shot put	17.86 m
2010	World Indoor Championships	Doha, Qatar	15th	Shot put	17.55 m
2010	Lithuanian Championships	Kaunas, Lithuania	2nd	Discus throw	53.89 m
2010	Lithuanian Championships	Kaunas, Lithuania	1st	Shot put	17.25 m
2010	European Championships	Barcelona, Spain	12th	Shot put	17.72 m
2011	European Indoor Championships	Paris, France	2nd	Pentathlon	4706 pts
2011	World Championships	Daegu, South Korea	8th	Heptathlon	6297 pts
2012	World Indoor Championships	Istanbul, Turkey	3rd	Pentathlon	4802 pts
2012	European Championships	Helsinki, Finland	11th	Shot put	16.53 m
2012	Olympic Games	London, Great Britain	3rd	Heptathlon	6599 pts
2016	European Championships	Amsterdam, Netherlands	14th	Heptathlon	5245 pts
2017	European Indoor Championships	Belgrade, Serbia	9th (q)	Shot put	17.37 m
