= Aleksas Abromavičius =

Lithuanian discus thrower (born 1984)

Aleksas Abromavičius (born 6 December 1984) is a discus thrower, who competes internationally for Lithuania. His personal record is 63.32 metres reached in 2010 Lithuanian Athletics Championships.

== Achievements ==
Year	Competition	Venue	Position	Notes
2008	Lithuanian Championships	Kaunas, Lithuania	2nd	17.19 (SP)
2008	Lithuanian Championships	Kaunas, Lithuania	2nd	57.63
2009	Lithuanian Championships	Kaunas, Lithuania	2nd	56.71
2010	Lithuanian Championships	Kaunas, Lithuania	1st	63.32
2010	European Championships	Barcelona, Spain	29th	58.05
