= Rasa Drazdauskaitė =

Lithuanian long-distance runner

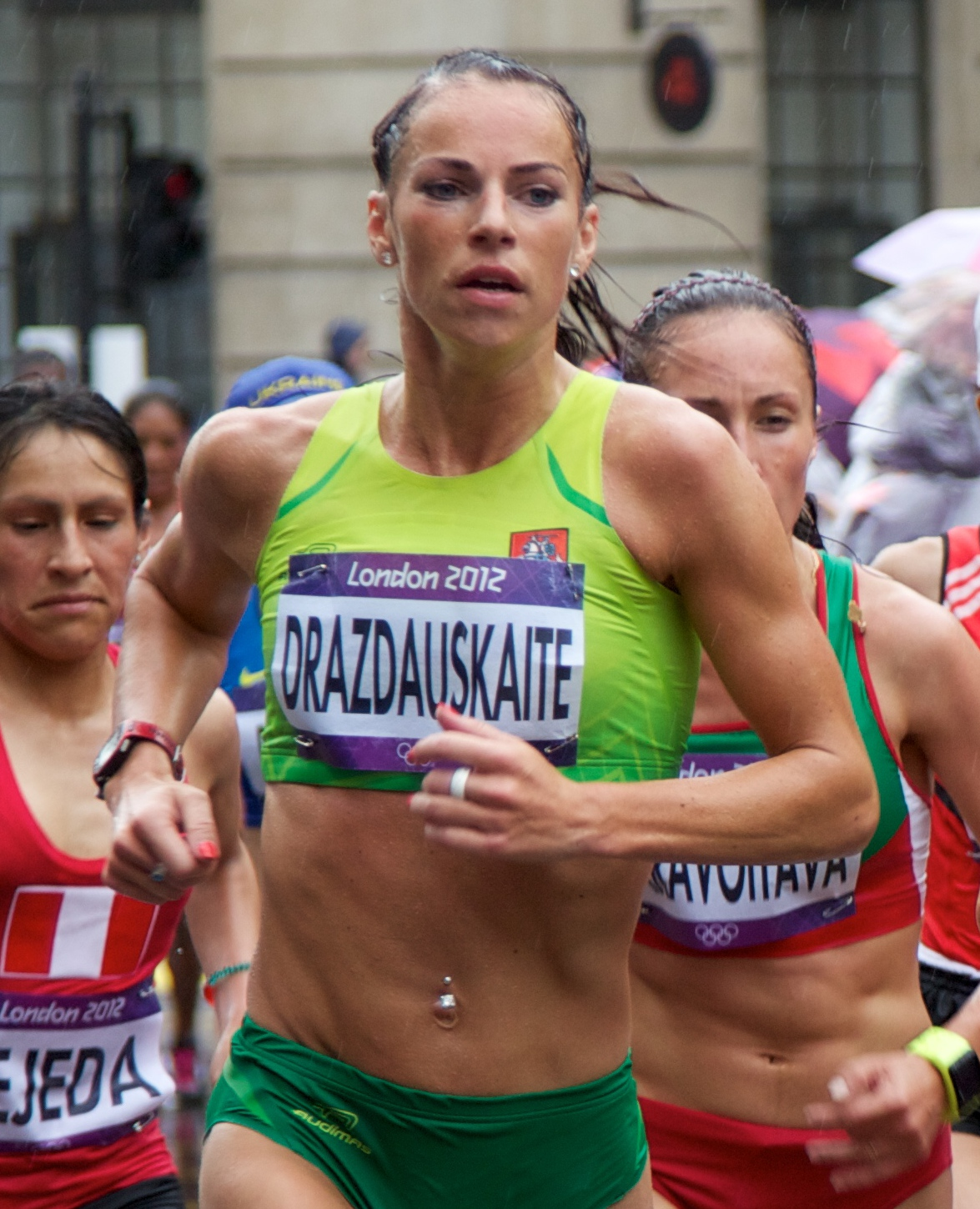
- Drazdauskaitė at the 2012 Olympics

Personal information
- Nationality: Lithuanian
- Born: 20 March 1981 (age 45)
- Height: 1.74 m (5 ft 9 in)
- Weight: 59 kg (130 lb)

Sport
- Sport: Running
- Event: Marathon

Rasa Drazdauskaitė (born 20 March 1981 in Šiauliai) is a Lithuanian long-distance runner. She is a three-time Olympian in the marathon, competing for Lithuania at the 2008, 2012, and 2016 Games. She also ran for Lithuania at the 2015 World Championships.

== Biography ==
As a junior, Drazdauskaitė ran the (1500 m) in 2000 World Junior Championships in Athletics where she finished fifth in 4:21.58. The next year, she ran 4:13.33 and placed fifth at the 2001 European Athletics U23 Championships. She also competed in the 1500 metres at the 2002 European Championships in Athletics.

After returning to competition after a suspension for performance-enhancing substances, Drazdauskaitė won the 2006 Vilnius Half Marathon and in 2009 she ran a course record time to win at the Tallinn Half Marathon.

She also competed indoors over 1500 m at the 2007 European Athletics Indoor Championships, running 4:23.38 in the heats. She ran 1:15:00 at Athletics at the 2009 Summer Universiade – Women's half marathon, placing 5th.

At the 2010 European Athletics Championships she ran for Lithuania in the women's marathon and placed 15th. She set a race record at the Athens Classic Marathon in October 2010, completing the race in a time of 2:31:06 to win the race and also the World Military Championship race.

Drazdauskaitė ran the 2011 Turin Marathon and was the runner-up behind Yuliya Ruban in a personal best time of 2:29:47.

Drazdauskaitė competed for Lithuania in three Olympics. In her Olympic debut in 2008 in Beijing, she ran 2:35:09 and finished 37th. At the 2012 Summer Olympics, she ran a personal best of 2:29:29. In her final Olympics in Rio 2016, she ran 2:35:50 to again place 37th.

Drazdauskaitė ran 2:31:23 at 2015 World Championships to place 11th. She was fourth at the 2016 European Athletics Championships women's half marathon.

=== Doping suspension ===
Drazdauskaitė was banned from competition from August 2003 to August 2005 after having a positive in-competition drug test for the steroid stanozolol.

== Personal bests ==
Event	Result
800 m	2:02.24 min
1500 m	4:07.78 min
10,000 m	33:16.06 min
Half marathon	1:12:54 hrs
Marathon	2:29:29 hrs

== See also ==
- List of doping cases in athletics
