= Karina Vnukova =

Lithuanian high jumper (born 1985)

Karina Vnukova (born 27 March 1985 in Vilnius, Lithuania) is a Lithuanian high jumper.

She finished eighth at the 2001 World Youth Championships. She later competed at the 2007 European Indoor Championships and the 2008 Olympic Games without reaching the final.

Her personal best is 1.87 metres, achieved in July 2008 in Strasbourg. She has 1.91 metres on the indoor track, achieved in January 2008 in Vilnius.

== Achievements ==
Year	Competition	Venue	Position	Event	Notes
Representing Lithuania
2002	Lithuanian Championships	Kaunas, Lithuania	2nd	High jump	1.78 m
2007	European U23 Championships	Debrecen, Hungary	6th	High jump	1.86 m
2007	European U23 Championships	Debrecen, Hungary	—	Triple jump	NM
2008	Olympic Games	Beijing, China	23rd (q)	High jump	1.85 m
2009	Universiade	Belgrade, Serbia	16th (q)	High jump	1.75 m
2009	Lithuanian Championships	Kaunas, Lithuania	1st	High jump	1.83 m
