= Indrė Jakubaitytė =

Lithuanian javelin thrower (born 1976)

Personal information
- Born: January 24, 1976 (age 49)
- Height: 1.76 m (5 ft 9 1/2 in)
- Weight: 73 kg (161 lb)

Sport
- Country: Lithuania
- Sport: Athletics
- Event: Javelin
- Updated on 11 August 2012

Indrė Jakubaitytė (born 24 January 1976) is a female javelin thrower from Lithuania. Her personal best throw is 63.65 metres, achieved in September 2007 in Kaunas is also the current national record. She competed at the 2007 World Championships, but without reaching the final.

== Achievements ==
Year	Competition	Venue	Position	Notes
Representing Lithuania
2007	World Championships	Osaka, Japan	25th (q)	56.16 m
2007	Military World Games	Hyderabad, India	3rd	54.93 m
2009	World Championships	Berlin, Germany	24th (q)	55.86 m
2011	World Championships	Daegu, South Korea	22nd (q)	56.92 m
2012	European Championships	Helsinki, Finland	15th (q)	54.39 m
2012	Olympic Games	London, Great Britain	18th (q)	59.05 m
2014	European Championships	Zürich, Switzerland	15th (q)	54.86 m
2016	European Championships	Amsterdam, Netherlands	–	NM
