= Vaida Žūsinaitė =

Lithuanian long-distance runner (born 1988)

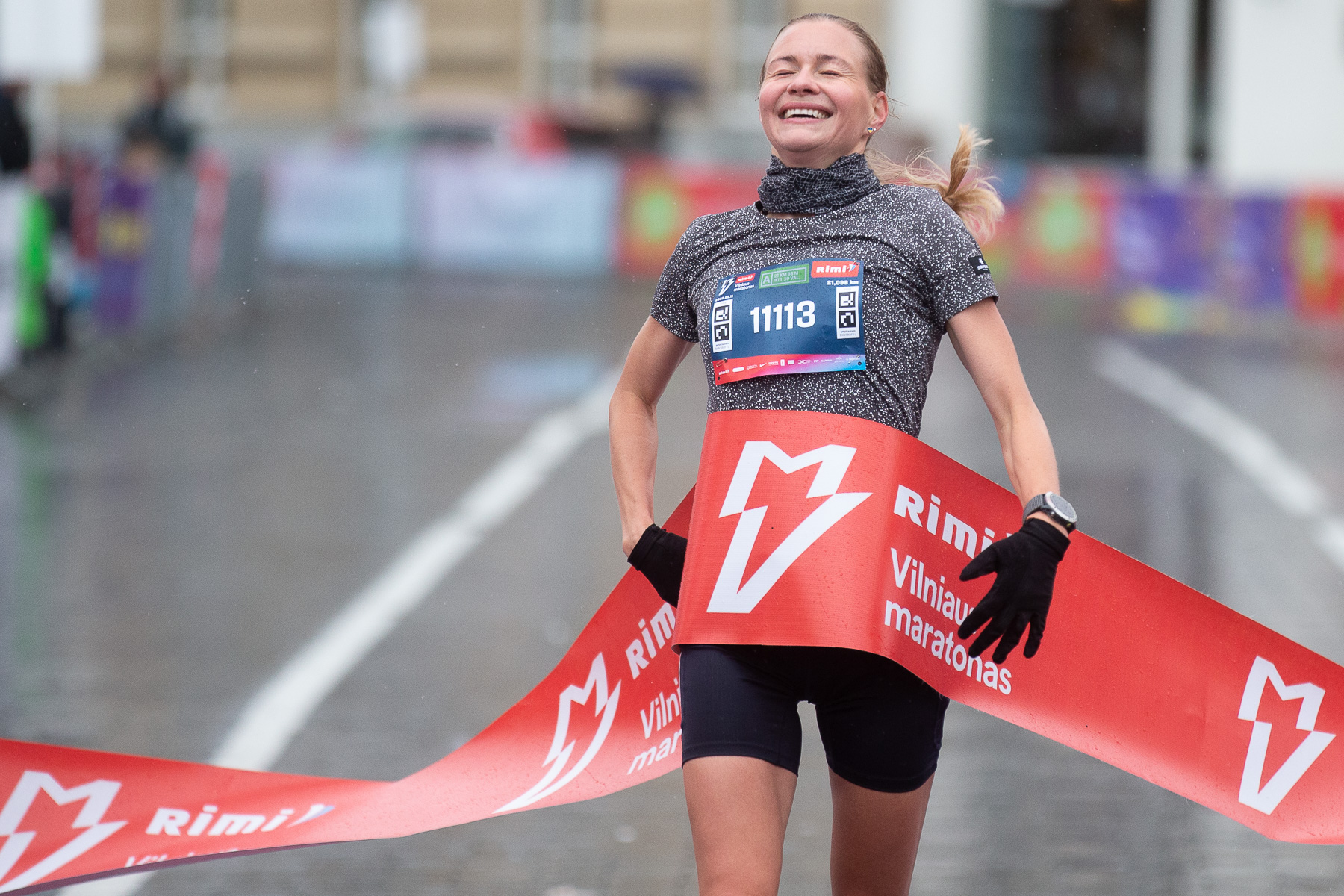
- Vaida Žūsinaitė-Nekriošienė at Vilnius Marathon 2022

Personal information
- Full name: Vaida Žūsinaitė-Nekriošienė
- Born: 13 January 1988 (age 38) Alytus, Lithuania
- Height: 1.67 m (5 ft 6 in)

Sport
- Country: Lithuania
- Sport: Athletics
- Event: Marathon
- Club: Million Steps

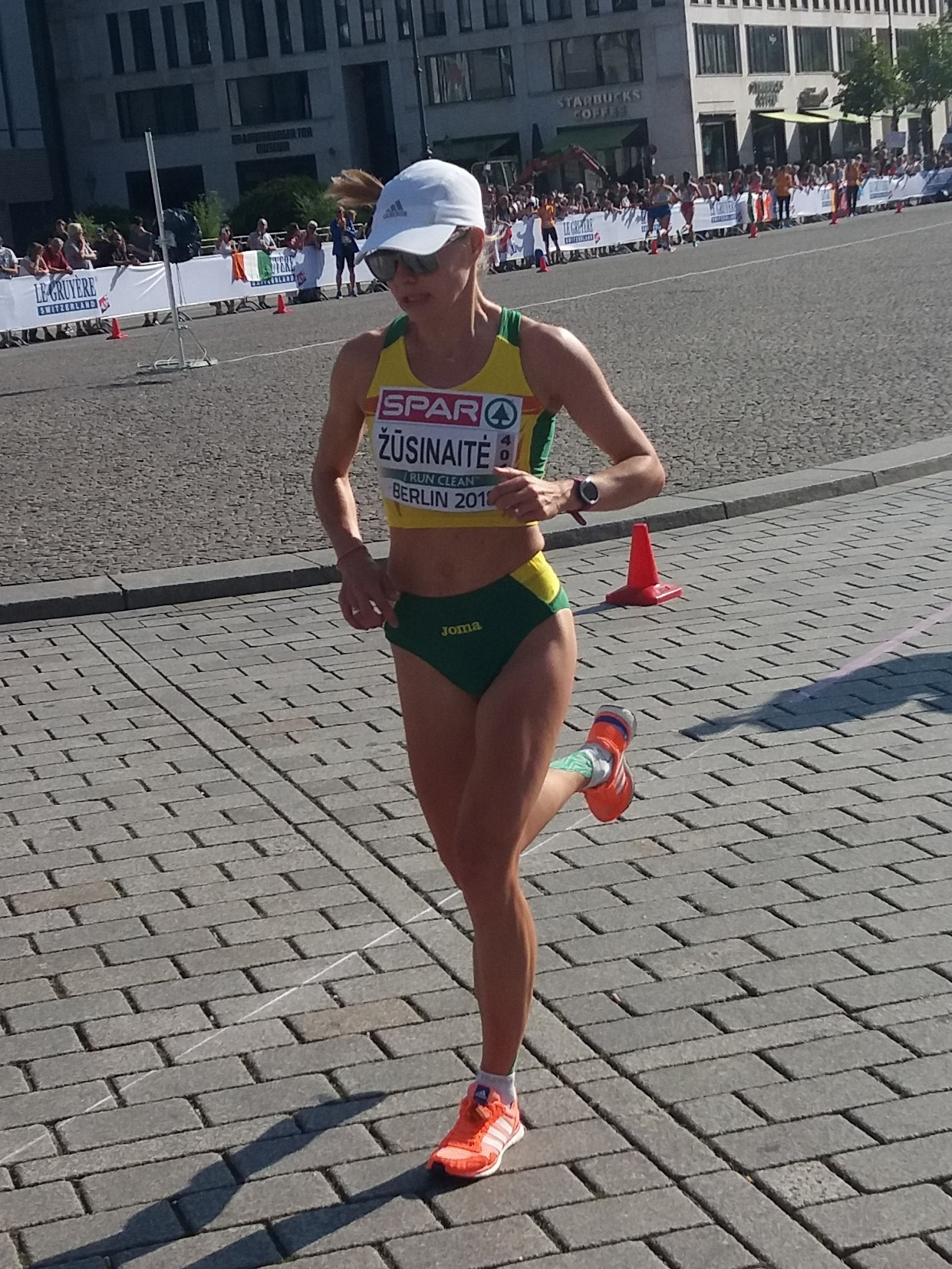
Žūsinaitė at the 2018 European Championships

Vaida Žūsinaitė-Nekriošienė (born 13 January 1988) is a long-distance runner who competes internationally for Lithuania.

In 2012, she represented Lithuania in the European Championships, where she finished 19th. Žūsinaitė met the qualification standards for the 2015 World Championships in Athletics, but might not be selected due to the three runners per nation rule. Five female Lithuanian marathon runners met the qualification standards. 2016 she broke her personal best in Hannover Marathon (2:32,50) and represented Lithuania in 2016 Summer Olympics., where she finished 38th (2:35,53).

== Personal bests ==
Event	Result	Year	Place
3000m Steeplechase	9:54.36	2012	Grodno, Belarus
Marathon	2:32.50	2016	Hannover, Germany
