= Vitalij Kozlov =

Lithuanian middle-distance runner (born 1987)

Medal record

Men's athletics

Representing Lithuania

European Team Championships
Bronze medal – third place	2011 Novi Sad	800 m

Vitalij Kozlov (born 5 March 1987) is a Lithuanian runner who specializes in the 800 metres.

He finished seventh at the 2007 European U23 Championships, and competed at the 2008 Olympic Games and the 2010 World Indoor Championships without reaching the final.

In 2009 he reached new national record in 800 m.

His personal best time is 1:46.58 minutes, achieved in July 2008 in Kaunas.
