= Sonata Tamošaitytė =

Lithuanian athlete (born 1987)

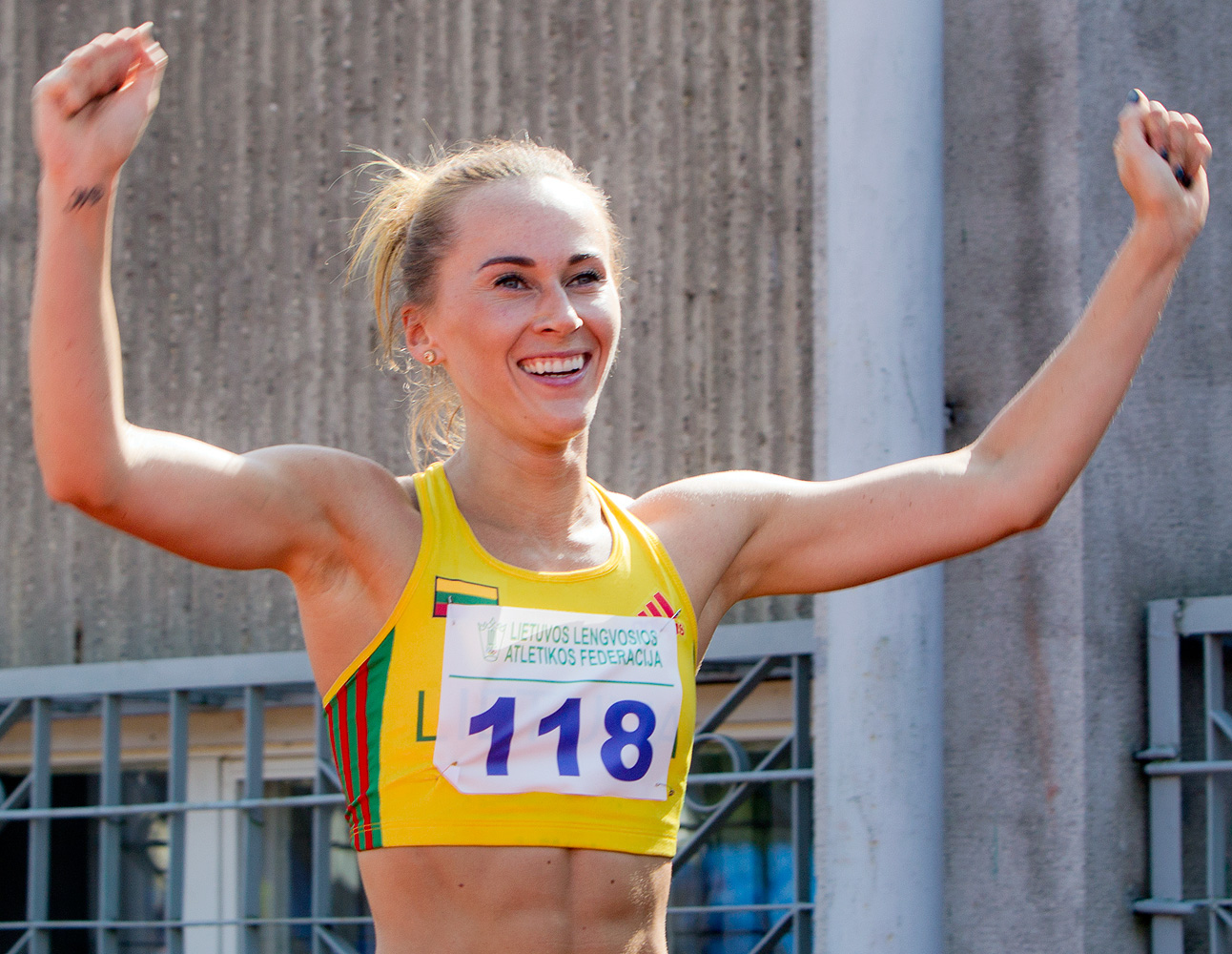

Personal information
- Full name: Sonata Tamošaitytė
- Born: 26 June 1987 (age 39) Kaunas, Lithuania

Sport
- Country: Lithuania
- Sport: Athletics
- Events: 100 m, 100 m hurdles

Achievements and titles
- Personal bests: 60 m hurdles: 8.03; 100 m: 12.08; 100 m hurdles: 13.10
Medal record
Universiade
Silver medal – second place	2009 Belgrade	100 m hurdles
European U23 Championships
Bronze medal – third place	2009 Kaunas	4 × 100 metres

Sonata Tamošaitytė (born 26 June 1987) is a Lithuanian athlete. She was born in Kaunas.

She competed in 2009 World Championships in Athletics and reached 31st place in the 100m hurdles. She also competed in 2009 European Athletics U23 Championships in Kaunas where she finished fifth in the 100 m hurdles and won bronze in the 4 × 100 m relay. At the Universiade in 2008 she finished 21st in the 100 m hurdles and sixth in the 4 × 100 m relay; in 2009 she won silver in the 100 m hurdles and also finished fifth in 4 × 100 m relay.

== Competition record ==
Year	Competition	Venue	Position	Event	Notes
Representing Lithuania
2005	European Junior Championships	Kaunas, Lithuania	21st (h)	100 m hurdles	14.67
2005	European Junior Championships	Kaunas, Lithuania	6th	4 × 100 m relay	45.47
2006	World Junior Championships	Beijing, China	–	100 m hurdles	DQ
2007	European U23 Championships	Debrecen, Hungary	28th (h)	100 m hurdles	14.13
2007	European U23 Championships	Debrecen, Hungary	10th (h)	4 × 100 m relay	45.37
2007	Universiade	Bangkok, Thailand	21st (h)	100 m hurdles	13.89
2007	Universiade	Bangkok, Thailand	6th	4 × 100 m relay	44.88
2009	Universiade	Belgrade, Serbia	2nd	100 m hurdles	13.10
2009	Universiade	Belgrade, Serbia	5th	4 × 100 m relay	44.48
2009	European U23 Championships	Kaunas, Lithuania	5th	100 m hurdles	13.36
2009	European U23 Championships	Kaunas, Lithuania	3rd	4 × 100 m relay	44.09
2010	European Championships	Barcelona, Spain	19th (h)	100 m hurdles	13.31
2010	European Championships	Barcelona, Spain	11th (h)	4 × 100 m relay	44.13
2011	Universiade	Shenzhen, China	11th (sf)	100 m hurdles	13.37
2011	Universiade	Shenzhen, China	–	4 × 100 m relay	DQ
2011	World Championships	Daegu, South Korea	25th (h)	100 m hurdles	13.28
2012	World Indoor Championships	Istanbul, Turkey	4th	60 m hurdles	8.03
2012	Olympic Games	London, United Kingdom	34th (h)	100 m hurdles	13.59
2013	Universiade	Kazan, Russia	8th	100 m hurdles	13.35
2014	European Championships	Zürich, Switzerland	28th (h)	100 m hurdles	13.24
2015	European Indoor Championships	Prague, Czech Republic	20th (h)	60 m hurdles	8.19
2015	Universiade	Gwangju, South Korea	10th (h)	100 m hurdles	13.78
2015	Universiade	Gwangju, South Korea	–	4 × 100 m relay	DNF
