= List of Baltic records in athletics =

This is a list of the Baltic records in athletics. These are the best results in athletics by athletes representing one of the Baltic countries:

- Estonia
- Latvia
- Lithuania

== Outdoor ==
Key to tables:

# = not ratified by national federation

=== Men ===
Event	Record	Athlete	Date	Meet	Place	Ref.
100 m	10.14 (−0.2 m/s)	(Lithuania) Rytis Sakalauskas	17 August 2011	Universiade	Shenzhen, China	
100 m	9.9 h	(Lithuania) Kastytis Klimas	21 May 1993		Kaunas, Lithuania	
200 m	20.41 (+1.3 m/s)	(Latvia) Sergejs Inšakovs	31 July 1996	Olympic Games	Atlanta, United States	
300 m	32.24	(Estonia) Marek Niit	7 September 2014	Rieti Meeting	Rieti, Italy	
400 m	45.35	(Estonia) Rasmus Mägi	25 June 2022	Estonian Championships	Tallinn, Estonia	
800 m	1:43.67	(Latvia) Dmitrijs Miļkevičs	3 July 2006		Athens, Greece	
1000 m	2:18.0	(Latvia) Einārs Tupurītis	16 July 1997		Nice, France	
1500 m	3:37.35	(Latvia) Dmitrijs Jurkevičs	28 June 2011	Folksam GP	Sollentuna, Sweden	
Mile	3:59.25	(Lithuania) Simas Bertašius	22 August 2020	LLAF Cup	Vilnius, Lithuania	
2000 m	5:04.59	(Estonia) Deniss Šalkauskas	16 June 2026	Heino Lipp Memorial	Jõhvi, Estonia	
3000 m	7:46.2	(Lithuania) Romas Sausaitis	19 June 1982		Podolsk, Soviet Union	
Two miles	8:29.46	(Lithuania) Lukas Verzbicas	4 June 2011	Prefontaine Classic	Eugene, United States	
5000 m	13:17.2	(Estonia) Enn Sellik	28 June 1976		Podolsk, Soviet Union	
5 km (road)	14:20	(Latvia) Dmitrijs Serjogins	31 December 2022	Cursa dels Nassos	Barcelona, Spain	
10,000 m	27:31.50	(Lithuania) Aleksandras Antipovas	29 August 1978	European Championships	Prague, Czechoslovakia	
10 km (road)	28:58	(Estonia) Toomas Turb	18 September 1983		Tallinn, Soviet Union	
15 km (road)	44:22	(Lithuania) Igor Osmak	30 April 1995		La Courneuve, France	
One hour	20000 m	(Latvia) Petris Kruminisch	30 April 1978		Vilnius, Soviet Union	
20 km (road)	56:52	(Lithuania) Aleksandras Antipovas	1979			
Half marathon	1:02:20	(Estonia) Tiidrek Nurme	17 October 2020	World Half Marathon Championships	Gdynia, Poland	
30 km (road)	1:34:28.4	(Lithuania) Anatolijus Baranovas	1971			
Marathon	2:08:53	(Estonia) Pavel Loskutov	7 April 2002	Paris Marathon	Paris, France	
50 km (track)	3:01:51+	(Lithuania) Aleksandr Sorokin	23 April 2022	Centurion RC 100	Bedford, United Kingdom	
50 km (road)	2:53:51	(Lithuania) Aleksandr Sorokin	3 July 2022		Alytus, Lithuania	
50 miles (track)	4:53:41+	(Lithuania) Aleksandr Sorokin	23 April 2022	Centurion RC 100	Bedford, United Kingdom	
6 hours (track)	98.496 km+	(Lithuania) Aleksandr Sorokin	23 April 2022	Centurion RC 100	Bedford, United Kingdom	
100 km (track)	6:05:41	(Lithuania) Aleksandr Sorokin	23 April 2022	Centurion RC 100	Bedford, United Kingdom	
100 km (road)	6:05:35	(Lithuania) Aleksandr Sorokin	14 May 2023	Nord Security World’s Fastest Run	Vilnius, Lithuania	
150 km (track)	10:27:48+	(Lithuania) Aleksandr Sorokin	24 April 2021	Centurion Running Track 100 Mile	Ashford, United Kingdom	
100 miles (track)	11:14:56+	(Lithuania) Aleksandr Sorokin	24 April 2021	Centurion Running Track 100 Mile	Ashford, United Kingdom	
100 miles (road)	10:51:39+	(Lithuania) Aleksandr Sorokin	6 January 2022	Spartanion Race	Tel Aviv, Israel	
12 hours (track)	170.309 km	(Lithuania) Aleksandr Sorokin	24 April 2021	Centurion Running Track 100 Mile	Ashford, United Kingdom	
12 hours (road)	177.410 km	(Lithuania) Aleksandr Sorokin	6 January 2022	Spartanion Race	Tel Aviv, Israel	
24 hours	319.614 km	(Lithuania) Aleksandr Sorokin	18 September 2022	IAU 24 Hour European Championships	Verona, Italy	
110 m hurdles	13.08 (±0.0 m/s)	(Latvia) Staņislavs Olijars	1 July 2003	Athletissima	Lausanne, Switzerland	
200 m hurdles	23.0 h	(Estonia) Kalju Jurkatamm	28 August 1968		Riga, Soviet Union	
400 m hurdles	47.82	(Estonia) Rasmus Mägi	14 June 2022	Paavo Nurmi Games	Turku, Finland	
2000 m steeplechase	5:44.91	(Estonia) Rainer Nõlvak	15 July 1985		Krasnodar, Soviet Union	
3000 m steeplechase	8:22.2	(Lithuania) Vladimiras Dudinas	19 August 1969		Kiev, Soviet Union	
High jump	2.34 m	(Lithuania) Rolandas Verkys	16 June 1991		Warsaw, Poland	
Pole vault	5.86 m	(Estonia) Valeri Bukrejev	3 July 1994		Somero, Finland	
Long jump	8.15 m (+0.5 m/s)	(Lithuania) Povilas Mykolaitis	4 June 2011	LLAF Cup	Kaunas, Lithuania	
Triple jump	17.56 m (+1.9 m/s)	(Latvia) Māris Bružiks	3 September 1988		Riga, Soviet Union	
Shot put	21.74 m	(Latvia) Jānis Bojārs	14 July 1984		Riga, Soviet Union	
Discus throw	74.35 m	(Lithuania) Mykolas Alekna	14 April 2024	Oklahoma Throws Series World Invitational	Ramona, United States	
Hammer throw	84.40 m	(Estonia) Jüri Tamm	9 September 1984		Banská Bystrica, Czechoslovakia	
Javelin throw	90.73 m	(Latvia) Vadims Vasiļevskis	22 July 2007		Tallinn, Estonia	
Decathlon	8815 pts	(Estonia) Erki Nool	6–7 August 2001	World Championships	Edmonton, Canada	
Decathlon	100m / Long jump / Shot put / High jump / 400m / 110m H / Discus / Pole vault / Javelin / 1500m; 10.60 (+1.5 m/s) / 7.63 m (+2.0 m/s) / 14.90 m / 2.03 m / 46.23 / 14.40 (±0.0 m/s) / 43.40 m / 5.40 m / 67.01 m / 4:29.58					
1500 m walk (track)	5:12.0+ h WB	(Lithuania) Antanas Grigaliūnas	12 May 1990		Vilnius, Lithuania	
Mile walk (track)	5:36.9 h WB	(Lithuania) Antanas Grigaliūnas	12 May 1990		Vilnius, Lithuania	
5000 m walk (track)	18:48.3 h	(Latvia) Aigars Fadejevs	21 June 1998		Lapinlahti, Finland	
10,000 m walk (track)	38:56.3 h	(Latvia) Ingus Janevics	26 April 2008		Valga, Estonia	
10 km walk (road)	38:34	(Lithuania) Valdas Kazlauskas	1989		Hildesheim, Germany	
15,000 m walk (track)	59:00.0 h	(Lithuania) Valdas Kazlauskas	1983		Moscow, Soviet Union	
15 km walk (road)	58:23	(Latvia) Aigars Fadejevs	7 September 1997		Druskininkai, Lithuania	
Hour walk (track)	15127 m	(Lithuania) Valdas Kazlauskas	1983		Moscow, Soviet Union	
20,000 m walk (track)	1:20:37	(Lithuania) Valdas Kazlauskas	1983		Moscow, Soviet Union	
20 km walk (road)	1:19:25	(Latvia) Aigars Fadejevs	25 August 2002		Hildesheim, Germany	
25 km walk (road)	1:55:03+	(Lithuania) Tadas Šuškevičius	16 February 2014	Spanish Racewalking Championships	Murcia, Spain	
Two hours walk (track)	27406 m	(Lithuania) Gintaras Andriuškevičius	2001		Alytus, Lithuania	
30,000 m walk (track)	2:12:03	(Lithuania) Gintaras Andriuškevičius	2001		Alytus, Lithuania	
30 km walk (road)	2:06:13	(Latvia) Aigars Fadejevs	1 May 2002		Sesto San Giovanni, Italy	
35 km walk (road)	2:34:16	(Lithuania) Marius Žiūkas	24 July 2022	World Championships	Eugene, United States	
40 km walk (road)	3:03:58+	(Lithuania) Donatas Škarnulis	29 March 2008		Dudince, Slovakia	
50,000 m walk (track)	3:59:48.4	(Latvia) Modris Liepiņš	7 May 1994		Fana, Norway	
50 km walk (road)	3:43:18	(Latvia) Aigars Fadejevs	6 June 1998		Ogre, Latvia	
70 km walk (road)	5:59:40	(Lithuania) Algirdas Šakalys	1979		Klaipėda, Soviet Union	
4 × 100 m relay	39.31	Latvia; Genādijs Murašovs; Ronald Razmuss; Juris Tone; Artūrs Āboliņš	18 June 1983		Moscow, Soviet Union	
4 × 200 m relay	1:25.3 h	Estonia; Gennadi Organov; Mihhail Urjadnikov; Gunnar Kirsipuu; Ramon Lindal	30 May 1981		Riga, Soviet Union	
Swedish relay	1:52.84	Estonia Tartu SS Kalev; Hans-Christian Hausenberg; Andreas Mutli; Henri Loose; Uku Renek Kronbergs	24 May 2026	Estonian Relay Championships	Tartu, Estonia	
4 × 400 m relay	3:04.30	Latvia; Sergejs Inšakovs; Egīls Tēbelis; Einārs Tupurītis; Ingūns Svikliņš	9 August 1997	World Championships	Athens, Greece	
4 × 800 m relay	7:23.3 h	Latvia; Sergejs Varša; Viktors Fedotovs; Olegs Stepanovs; Ēriks Barkovskis	30 May 1981		Riga, Soviet Union	
4 × 1500 m relay	15:14.0 h	Latvia; Mārtiņš Paukšens; Valdis Šangelis; Vladimis Pehotko; Uldis Rubezis	16 October 1969		Uzhhorod, Soviet Union	
Ekiden relay	2:09:59	Estonia (Team Tartu Ülikooli ASK); Deniss Košelev; Tiidrek Nurme; Alexey Markov; Nikolai Vedehin; Kenny Kivikas; Allar Lamp	28 September 2013	Estonian Championships	Tallinn, Estonia	

=== Women ===
Event	Record	Athlete	Date	Meet	Place	Ref.
100 y	10.69+ (−0.6 m/s)	(Lithuania) Lina Grinčikaitė	27 May 2010	Golden Spike Ostrava	Ostrava, Czech Republic	
100 m	11.19 (+1.5 m/s)	(Lithuania) Lina Grinčikaitė	3 August 2012	Olympic Games	London, United Kingdom	
200 m	22.49	(Latvia) Vineta Ikauniece	23 May 1987		Tsaghkadzor, Soviet Union	
300 m	36.36	(Latvia) Gunta Vaičule	20 June 2019	Golden Spike Ostrava	Ostrava, Czech Republic	
400 m	50.71	(Latvia) Vineta Ikauniece	4 September 1988		Moscow, Soviet Union	
500 m (road)	1:08.29	(Latvia) Līga Velvere	8 September 2018	GreatCity Games	Gateshead, United Kingdom	
600 m	1:30.65	(Estonia) Marielle Kleemeier	18 June 2024	Reunión Internacional Villa de Bilbao	Bilbao, Spain	
800 m	1:56.7	(Lithuania) Dalia Matusevičienė	25 June 1988		Kiev, Soviet Union	
1000 m	2:32.3	(Lithuania) Laimutė Baikauskaitė	12 September 1985		Podolsk, Soviet Union	
1500 m	4:00.24	(Lithuania) Laimutė Baikauskaitė	1 October 1988	Olympic Games	Seoul, Korea	
Mile	4:36.35	(Estonia) Liina Tšernov	18 August 2017	Nõmme seeriajooks	Tallinn, Estonia	
2000 m	5:45.72	(Lithuania) Stefanija Statkuvienė	1990			
3000 m	8:39.25	(Lithuania) Regina Čistiakova	6 July 1986		Moscow, Soviet Union	
5000 m	14:47.71	(Latvia) Jeļena Prokopčuka	11 August 2000	DN Galan	Stockholm, Sweden	
5 km (road)	15:44 Mx	(Latvia) Agate Caune	31 December 2022	Cursa dels Nassos	Barcelona, Spain	
10,000 m	30:38.78	(Latvia) Jeļena Prokopčuka	7 August 2006	European Championships	Gothenburg, Sweden	
10 km (road)	31:33	(Latvia) Jeļena Prokopčuka	21 May 2006	Great Manchester Run	Manchester, United Kingdom	
15 km (road)	50:00	(Estonia) Jane Salumäe	21 May 1995		Helsingborg, Sweden	
One hour	15177 m	(Estonia) Kaia Lepik	23 August 2017		Kohila, Estonia	
20 km (road)	1:07:41+	(Lithuania) Živilė Balčiūnaitė	19 November 2006	Tokyo International Marathon	Tokyo, Japan	
Half marathon	1:08:43	(Latvia) Jeļena Prokopčuka	7 October 2001		Bristol, United Kingdom	
Marathon	2:22:56	(Latvia) Jeļena Prokopčuka	30 January 2005	Osaka International Ladies Marathon	Osaka, Japan	
50 km (road)	3:25:39	(Lithuania) Gitana Akmanavičiūtė	3 July 2022		Alytus, Lithuania	
100 km (road)	7:38:58	(Lithuania) Gitana Akmanavičiūtė	19 July 2020		Vilnius, Lithuania	
100 m hurdles	12.87 (+1.3 m/s) (Note: record set during heptathlon competition)	(Lithuania) Beatričė Juškevičiūtė	18 May 2024	Hypo-Meeting	Götzis, Austria	
100 m hurdles	12.6 h	(Latvia) Ludmila Olijare	5 August 1989		Vilnius, Soviet Union	
200 m hurdles	27.5 h	(Estonia) Saima Tiik	15 September 1974		Vilnius, Soviet Union	
400 m hurdles	54.02	(Lithuania) Ana Ambraziene	11 June 1983		Moscow, Soviet Union	
2000 m steeplechase	6:17.07	(Estonia) Laura Maasik	1 September 2024	ISTAF Berlin	Berlin, Germany	
3000 m steeplechase	9:27.21	(Latvia) Poļina Jeļizarova	4 August 2012	Olympic Games	London, United Kingdom	
High jump	1.98 m	(Lithuania) Airinė Palšytė	27 July 2014	Lithuanian Championships	Kaunas, Lithuania	
High jump	1.98 m	(Lithuania) Airinė Palšytė	24 August 2014	Internationales Hochsprung-Meeting Eberstadt	Eberstadt, Germany	
Pole vault	4.57 m	(Estonia) Marleen Mülla	15 May 2025	Summit League Championships	Vermillion, United States	
Long jump	7.20 m (+2.0 m/s)	(Lithuania) Irena Oženko	12 September 1986		Budapest, Hungary	
Triple jump	14.76 m (+1.1 m/s)	(Latvia) Gundega Sproģe	29 June 1997		Sheffield, United Kingdom	
Shot put	20.27 m	(Lithuania) Danguolė Bimbaitė	13 May 1987		Leselidze, Soviet Union	
Discus throw	72.14 m	(Lithuania) Galina Murašova	17 August 1984		Prague, Czechoslovakia	
Hammer throw	73.56 m	(Latvia) Laura Igaune	10 May 2019	Mount Olive First Chance and Multi	Mount Olive, United States	
Javelin throw	66.18 m	(Latvia) Madara Palameika	9 September 2016	Memorial Van Damme	Brussels, United States	
Heptathlon	6815 pts	(Latvia) Laura Ikauniece-Admidiņa	27–28 May 2017	Hypo Meeting	Götzis, Austria	
Heptathlon	100m H / High jump / Shot put / 200m / Long jump / Javelin / 800m; 13.10 (+1.0 m/s) / 1.77 m / 13.53 m / 23.49 (−2.9 m/s) / 6.64 m (+0.8 m/s) / 56.17 m / 2:11.76					
Decathlon	8358 pts WB	(Lithuania) Austra Skujytė	14–15 April 2005		Columbia, United States	
Decathlon	100m (wind) / Discus / Pole vault / Javelin / 400m / 100m H (wind) / Long jump (wind) / Shot put / High jump / 1500m; 12.49 / 46.19 m / 3.10 m / 48.78 m / 57.19 / 14.22 / 6.12 m / 16.42 m / 1.78 m / 5:15.86					
1500 m walk (track)	5:53.0	(Lithuania) Sada Eidikytė	1990		Vilnius, Lithuania	
Mile walk (track)	6:19.40	(Lithuania) Sada Eidikytė	1990		Vilnius, Lithuania	
3000 m walk (track)	12:05.72	(Lithuania) Brigita Virbalytė-Dimšienė	2 June 2018	Lithuanian Students Championships	Utena, Lithuania	
3 km walk (road)	12:19	(Lithuania) Sonata Milušauskaitė	1999		Hildesheim, Germany	
Two miles walk (track)	13:48.8	(Lithuania) Sada Eidikytė	1990		Vilnius, Lithuania	
5000 m walk (track)	21:07.7	(Latvia) Jolanta Dukure	28 April 2007		Murjāņi, Latvia	
5 km walk (road)	20:53	(Lithuania) Sada Eidikytė	1989		Hildesheim, Germany	
10,000 m walk (track)	44:07.88	(Latvia) Anita Liepina	4 August 1997	World Championships	Athens, Greece	
10 km walk (road)	42:43	(Lithuania) Brigita Virbalytė-Dimšienė	5 September 2015		Katowice, Poland	
15 km walk (road)	1:05:56+	(Lithuania) Živilė Vaiciukevičiūtė	11 August 2018	European Championships	Berlin, Germany	
20,000 m walk (track)	1:35:23.67	(Lithuania) Kristina Saltanovič	3 August 2000	Lithuanian Championships	Kaunas, Lithuania	
20 km walk (road)	1:27:59	(Lithuania) Brigita Virbalytė-Dimšienė	11 August 2018	European Championships	Berlin, Germany	
30 km walk (road)	2:39:45	(Latvia) Jolanta Dukure	30 September 2006		Ogre, Latvia	
50 km walk (road)	4:16:27	(Latvia) Jolanta Dukure	9 September 2006		Paralepa, Estonia	
4 × 100 m relay	43.95	Lithuania; Edita Lingyte; Lina Grinčikaitė; Sonata Tamošaitytė; Audra Dagelytė	5 July 2008		Madrid, Spain	
4 × 200 m relay	1:33.8	Latvia; Alla Kozlovska; Inta Drēviņa; Irina Grigorjeva; Ingrida Barkāne	29 July 1979		Moscow, Soviet Union	
4 × 400 m relay	3:27.54	Lithuania; Margarita Navickaitė; Teresa Valiulienė; Aldona Mendzarytė; Ana Ambrazienė	22 June 1983		Moscow, Soviet Union	
4 × 800 m relay	7:58.5	Lithuania; Ana Ambrazienė; Danguolė Bislyte; Laima Juknavičienė; Laimutė Baikauskaitė	8 September 1980		Donetsk, Soviet Union	
Ekiden relay	2:30:46	Estonia (Team Tartu Ülikooli ASK); Keiti Mets; Jekaterina Patjuk; Egle Mätas; Liina Luik; Leila Luik; Lily Luik	28 September 2013	Estonian Championships	Tallinn, Estonia	

=== Mixed ===
Event	Record	Team	Date	Meet	Place	Ref.
4 × 100 m relay	41.28	Lithuania; Lukrecija Sabaitytė; Ema Rupšytė; Adas Dambrauskas; Gediminas Truskauskas	24 June 2026	Jerusalem Grand Slam	Jerusalem, Israel	
4 × 400 m relay	3:15.95	Lithuania; Lukas Sutkus; Ema Sarafinaitė; Tomas Keršulis; Modesta Justė Morauskaitė	22 June 2023	European Team Championships	Chorzów, Poland	
Ekiden relay	2:24:44	Estonia; Ats Sõnajalg; Olga Andrejeva; Katrina Stepanova; Roman Fosti; Brit Rammul; Roman Hvalõnski	20 April 2019	Estonian Ekiden Championships	Tallinn, Estonia	

== Indoor ==
=== Men ===
Event	Record	Athlete	Date	Meet	Place	Ref.	Video
50 m	5.78+	(Lithuania) Rytis Sakalauskas	14 February 2012	Meeting Pas de Calais	Liévin, France		
60 m	6.55	(Estonia) Karl Erik Nazarov	19 March 2022	World Championships	Belgrade, Serbia		
60 m	6.4 h	(Latvia) Juris Silovs	4 February 1971		Moscow, Soviet Union		
60 m	6.4 h	(Latvia) Genadijs Murasovs	30 January 1981		Riga, Soviet Union		
60 m	6.4 h	(Lithuania) Andrius Kornikas	26 February 1983		Vilnius, Soviet Union		
60 m	6.4 h	(Estonia) Enn Lilienthal	21 February 1988		Moscow, Soviet Union		
60 m	6.4 h	(Lithuania) Kastytis Klimas	14 January 1989		Vilnius, Soviet Union		
60 m	6.4 h	(Lithuania) Eimantas Skrabulis	14 February 1989		Klaipėda, Soviet Union		
60 m	6.4 h	(Lithuania) Vilmantas Pipiras	8 January 1992		Kaunas, Lithuania		
100 m	10.58	(Lithuania) Rytis Sakalauskas	27 February 2010	Florø Indoor Games	Florø, Norway		
100 m	10.3 h	(Latvia) Āris Āboliņš	24 February 1980		Moscow, Russia		
150 m	15.53 OT	(Lithuania) Rytis Sakalauskas	11 February 2010	Botnia Games	Korsholm, Finland		
200 m	20.63	(Estonia) Marek Niit	15 February 2014	Tyson Invitational	Fayetteville, United States		
300 m	33.40	(Estonia) Lukas Lessel	30 January 2022	Eesti talvised karikavõistlused	Tallinn, Estonia		
400 m	45.78	(Lithuania) Tomas Keršulis	11 February 2023	David Hemery Valentine Invitational	Boston, United States		
500 m	1:05.0	(Latvia) Aivars Krisans	18 January 1987		Klaipėda, Soviet Union		
600 m	1:15.60	(Latvia) Dmitrijs Miļkevičs	5 February 2005		Lincoln, United States		
800 m	1:45.72	(Latvia) Dmitrijs Milkevics	9 March 2008	World Championships	Valencia, Spain		
1000 m	2:21.87	(Estonia) Marko Metsala	17 February 2000	GE Galan	Stockholm, Sweden		
1500 m	3:38.32	(Lithuania) Simas Bertašius	3 February 2022	Czech Indoor Gala	Ostrava, Czech Republic		
Mile	4:02.42	(Estonia) Andi Noot	28 December 2016	TÜ ASK aastalõpu teivashüppevõistlus	Tartu, Estonia		
2000 m	5:07.22	(Estonia) Andi Noot	17 December 2016	Olümpiavõitja Jaak Uudmäe auhinnavõistlused	Tartu, Estonia		
3000 m	7:55.0	(Lithuania) Aleksandras Antipovas	12 February 1978		Vilnius, Soviet Union		
Two miles	8:40.70	(Lithuania) Lukas Verzbickas	13 March 2011	New Balance Nationals	New York City, United States		
5000 m	13:45.10	(Lithuania) Mindaugas Pukštas	15 February 2003	Tyson Invitational	Fayetteville, United States		
Marathon	2:39:03	(Estonia) Ahti Nuga	28 January 2023	9. Tondiraba sisemaraton	Tallinn, Estonia		
50 m hurdles	6.46+	(Latvia) Staņislavs Olijars	23 February 2003		Liévin, France		
55 m hurdles	7.18	(Latvia) Staņislavs Olijars	30 January 1999		Gainesville, United States		
60 m hurdles	7.42	(Latvia) Igors Kazanovs	25 February 1989		Moscow, Soviet Union		
110 m hurdles	13.66	(Latvia) Igors Kazanovs	23 February 1992		Saint Petersburg, Russia		
2000 m steeplechase	5:25.45	(Estonia) Mati Uusmaa	2 February 1986		Moscow, Soviet Union		
3000 m steeplechase	8:37.0	(Lithuania) Antanas Stančius	3 March 1988		Vilnius, Soviet Union		
High jump	2.28 m	(Latvia) Normunds Sietiņš	15 February 1992		Panevėžys, Lithuania		
High jump	2.28 m	(Lithuania) Raivydas Stanys	31 January 2015	LLAF Cup	Vilnius, Lithuania		
Pole vault	5.74 m	(Latvia) Aleksandrs Obizajevs	12 February 1983		Moscow, Soviet Union		
Long jump	8.13 m	(Lithuania) Povilas Mykolaitis	11 February 2005		Kaunas, Lithuania		
Triple jump	17.54 m	(Latvia) Māris Bružiks	23 February 1986		Madrid, Spain		
Shot put	21.25 m	(Latvia) Jānis Bojārs	17 February 1984		Moscow, Soviet Union		
Shot put	21.25 m	(Latvia) Maris Petrasko	8 January 1989		Vilnius, Soviet Union		
Weight throw	19.85 m	(Lithuania) Martynas Šedys	7 February 2015	Boston University Scarlet and White	Boston, United States		
Discus throw	69.51 m WB	(Estonia) Gerd Kanter	22 March 2009	World Record Indoor Challenge	Växjö, Sweden		
Heptathlon	6437 pts	(Estonia) Johannes Erm	22–23 March 2025	World Championships	Nanjing, China		
Heptathlon	60m / Long jump / Shot put / High jump / 60m H / Pole vault / 1000m; 6.94 / 7.77 m / 15.27 m / 1.98 m / 7.91 / 5.30 m / 2:34.91						
3000 m walk	10:56.30	(Lithuania) Marius Žiukas	25 February 2018	Glasgow Grand Prix	Glasgow, United Kingdom		
Two miles walk	11:54.50 WB	(Lithuania) Valdas Kazlauskas	24 February 1990		Kaunas, Soviet Union		
5000 m walk	18:48.8	(Lithuania) Valdas Kazlauskas	9 February 1992		Kaunas, Lithuania		
10,000 m walk	39:34.6	(Latvia) Aivars Rumbenieks	17 February 1980		Moscow, Soviet Union		
15,000 m walk	1:00:03.9 WB	(Lithuania) Valdas Kazlauskas	24 January 1987		Kaunas, Soviet Union		
4 × 200 m relay	1:25.52	Estonia; Marek Niit; Henri Sool; Ahti Michelson; Martin Vihmann	19 February 2005	Baltic match	Tallinn, Estonia		
4 × 400 m relay	3:14.81	Estonia (Team Audentese SK); Sten Ander Sepp; Karl Erik Nazarov; Erik Jagor; Tony Nõu	18 February 2018	Estonian Championships	Tallinn, Estonia		
4 × 800 m relay	7:52.9	Lithuania (Team Klaipėda); Linas Bružas; Egidijus Rupšys; Viktoras Mauricas; Darius Gruzdys	18 January 2003		Klaipėda, Lithuania		

=== Women ===
Event	Record	Athlete	Date	Meet	Place	Ref.
50 m	6.31	(Lithuania) Agnė Visockaitė	8 January 2000		Saskatoon, Canada	
55 m	6.75	(Lithuania) Agnė Visockaitė	25 February 2000		Lincoln, United States	
60 m	7.23	(Lithuania) Agnė Visockaitė	21 February 2002		Kaunas, Lithuania	
60 m	7.0 h	(Latvia) Vineta Ikauniece	19 January 1986		Minsk, Soviet Union	
100 m	11.82	(Estonia) Katrin Käärt	4 February 2002		Tampere, Finland	
100 m	11.5 h	(Latvia) Vineta Ikauniece	26 January 1986		Riga, Soviet Union	
150 m	17.75	(Estonia) Ann Marii Kivikas	2 January 2025	Pole Vault GP	Tallinn, Estonia	
200 m	23.39	(Lithuania) Agnė Visockaitė	5 March 1999	World Championships	Maebashi, Japan	
200 m	23.15 # (Note: citizenship status not confirmed)	(Latvia) Marina Krivosheina-Trandenkova	5 March 1988		Minsk, Soviet Union	
300 m	36.96	(Latvia) Gunta Latiševa-Čudare	13 February 2018	Meeting Pas de Calais	Liévin, France	
400 m	51.63	(Lithuania) Modesta Morauskaitė	2 March 2022	Villa de Madrid Indoor Meeting	Madrid, Spain	
500 m	1:14.4	(Latvia) Anna Anfinogentova	14 February 2004		Riga, Latvia	
600 m	1:27.70	(Lithuania) Dalia Matusevičienė	21 February 1988		Moscow, Soviet Union	
800 m	2:01.07	(Lithuania) Gabija Galvydyte	24 February 2024	Big 12 Championships	Lubbock, United States	
1000 m	2:35.5	(Lithuania) Laimutė Baikauskaitė	31 January 1988		Vilnius, Soviet Union	
1500 m	4:08.02	(Lithuania) Laimutė Baikauskaitė	10 January 1988		Volgograd, Soviet Union	
Mile	4:32.67	(Lithuania) Natalija Piliušina	26 January 2018	John Thomas Terrier Classic	Boston, United States	
Mile	4:32.26 OT	(Lithuania) Natalija Piliušina	9 February 2013	Husky Classic	Seattle, United States	
2000 m	5:50.7	(Lithuania) Laimutė Baikauskaitė	30 January 1988		Vilnius, Soviet Union	
3000 m	8:44.66	(Latvia) Jeļena Prokopčuka	27 February 2000	European Championships	Ghent, Belgium	
5000 m	15:49.06	(Lithuania) Regina Čistiakova	3 February 1990		Lincoln, United States	
50 m hurdles	7.09	(Estonia) Mirjam Liimask	20 February 2008	BIG Kuldliiga	Tartu, Estonia	
55 m hurdles	7.72 A	(Estonia) Anu Kaljurand	29 February 1992		Colorado Springs, United States	
60 m hurdles	7.96	(Estonia) Kreete Verlin	6 February 2026	Villa de Madrid Indoor Meeting	Madrid, Spain	
100 m hurdles	13.1	(Latvia) Ludmila Olijara	19 February 1984		Moscow, Soviet Union	
1500 m steeplechase	4:50.6 h	(Lithuania) Rasa Drazdauskaitė	17 February 2006		Kaunas, Lithuania	
1500 m steeplechase	4:43.86 #	(Lithuania) Vaida Žūsinaitė	16 February 2013	Šiaulių taurė	Šiauliai, Lithuania	
2000 m steeplechase	7:16.26	(Latvia) Anna Marija Petrakova	27 February 2020		Kyiv, Ukraine	
High jump	2.01 m	(Lithuania) Airinė Palšytė	4 March 2017	European Championships	Belgrade, Serbia	
Pole vault	4.63 m	(Estonia) Marleen Mülla	20 February 2026	Nebraska Tune Up	Lincoln, United States	
Long jump	7.01 m	(Lithuania) Nijolė Medvedeva	25 January 1987		Kaunas, Soviet Union	
Triple jump	14.26 m	(Estonia) Kaire Leibak	9 February 2008	Estonian Championships	Tartu, Estonia	
Shot put	19.60 m	(Lithuania) Danguolė Bimbaitė-Urbikienė	25 February 1984		Gomel, Soviet Union	
Shot put	20.20 m #	(Lithuania) Danguolė Bimbaitė-Urbikienė	18 January 1987		Klaipėda, Soviet Union	
Discus throw	44.96 m	(Estonia) Kätlin Tõllasson	10 March 2012	World Indoor Throwing	Växjö, Sweden	
Weight throw	20.02 m	(Latvia) Laura Igaune	18 January 2014	Otterbein Invitational	Westerville, United States	
Pentathlon	4802 pts	(Lithuania) Austra Skujytė	9 March 2012	World Championships	Istanbul, Turkey	
Pentathlon	60m H / High jump / Shot put / Long jump / 800m; 8.57 / 1.90 m / 16.26 m / 6.24 m / 2:19.99					
Mile walk	6:16.72 WB	(Lithuania) Sada Eidikytė	24 February 1990		Kaunas, Soviet Union	
3000 m walk	12:07.19	(Lithuania) Brigita Virbalytė-Dimšienė	8 February 2014	Vienna Indoor Gala	Vienna, Austria	
3000 m walk	12:07.19	(Lithuania) Brigita Virbalytė-Dimšienė	22 February 2014	Lithuanian Championships	Klaipėda, Lithuania	
5000 m walk	21:23.44	(Lithuania) Brigita Virbalytė-Dimšienė	21 February 2009		Kaunas, Lithuania	
4 × 200 m relay	1:38.87	Lithuania; Edita Lingytė; Audra Dagelytė; Jūratė Kudirkaitė; Lina Andrijauskaitė	19 February 2005	Baltic match	Tallinn, Estonia	
4 × 400 m relay	3:43.42	Lithuania; Edita Kavaliauskienė; Jekaterina Sakovič; Živilė Brokoriūtė; Agnė Orlauskaitė	8 March 2009	European Championships	Turin, Italy	

== See also ==
- List of Estonian records in athletics
- List of Latvian records in athletics
- List of Lithuanian records in athletics
- List of Baltic records in swimming
