= List of Lithuanian records in athletics =

The following are the national records in athletics in Lithuania maintained by the Lithuanian Athletics Federation (LAF).

== Outdoor ==
Key to tables: Awaiting ratification Record not kept by LAF Not ratified or later rescined by LAF

=== Men ===
| Event | Record | Athlete | Date | Meet | Place | Ref. | Video |
|---|---|---|---|---|---|---|---|
| 100 m | 10.14 (−0.2 m/s) | Rytis Sakalauskas | 17 August 2011 | Universiade | Shenzhen, China | | |
| 100 m | 9.9 h | Kastytis Klimas | 21 May 1993 | | Kaunas, Lithuania | | |
| 200 m | 20.48 (+1.9 m/s) | Gediminas Truskauskas | 9 June 2021 | Austrian Open | Eisenstadt, Austria | | |
| 300 m | 33.48 | Raimondas Turla | 20 September 2003 | Jurbarkas 2003 | Jurbarkas, Lithuania | | |
| 400 m | 45.73 A | Remigijus Valiulis | 27 September 1979 | | Mexico City, Mexico | | |
| 400 m | 45.4 h | Remigijus Valiulis | 4 June 1980 | | Leningrad, Soviet Union | | |
| 400 m | 45.4 h | Jonas Motiejūnas | 3 August 2000 | | Kaunas, Lithuania | | |
| 800 m | 1:46.58 | Vitalij Kozlov | 8 July 2008 | | Kaunas, Lithuania | | |
| 1000 m | 2:19.72 | Simas Bertašius | 31 August 2024 | Mityng Ambasadorów Białostockiego i Podlaskiego Sportu | Białystok, Poland | | |
| 1500 m | 3:37.38 | Simas Bertašius | 11 July 2021 | Meeting International de Sotteville | Sotteville, France | | |
| Mile | 3:59.25 | Simas Bertašius | 22 August 2020 | LLAF Cup | Vilnius, Lithuania | | |
| 2000 m | 5:08.4 | Jonas Pipynė | 7 September 1958 | | | | |
| 3000 m | 7:42.07 | Simas Bertašius | 12 July 2025 | British Milers Club Grand Prix | Watford, United Kingdom | | |
| Two miles | 8:29.46 | Lukas Verzbicas | 4 June 2011 | Prefontaine Classic | Eugene, United States | | |
| 5000 m | 13:17.9 h | Aleksandras Antipovas | 9 June 1979 | | Sochi, Soviet Union | | |
| 5 km (road) | 13:51 | Simas Bertašius | 19 September 2026 | World Road Running Championships | Copenhagen, Denmark | | |
| 10,000 m | 27:31.50 | Aleksandras Antipovas | 29 August 1978 | | Prague, Czechoslovakia | | |
| 10 km (road) | 28:19 | Giedrius Valinčus | 11 January 2026 | 10K Valencia Ibercaja by Kiprun | Valencia, Spain | | |
| 12 km (road) | 36:07 | Mindaugas Pukštas | 7 May 2006 | | Spokane, United States | | |
| 15 km (road) | 44:22 | Igor Osmak | 30 April 1995 | | La Courneuve, France | | |
| 10 miles (road) | 48:30 | Mindaugas Pukštas | 22 October 2006 | | Portsmouth, United Kingdom | | |
| 20 km (road) | 56:52 | Aleksandras Antipovas | 1979 | | | | |
| Half marathon | 1:03:27 | Giedrius Valinčius | 14 September 2025 | Copenhagen Half Marathon | Copenhagen, Denmark | | |
| 30 km (road) | 1:34:28.4 | Anatolijus Baranovas | 1971 | | | | |
| Marathon | 2:12:35 | Česlovas Kundrotas | 26 October 1997 | Frankfurt Marathon | Frankfurt, Germany | | |
| 50 km (track) | 3:01:51+ | Aleksandr Sorokin | 23 April 2022 | Centurion RC 100 | Bedford, United Kingdom | | |
| 50 km (road) | 2:53:51 | Aleksandr Sorokin | 3 July 2022 | | Alytus, Lithuania | | |
| 50 miles (track) | 4:53:41+ | Aleksandr Sorokin^{lt} | 23 April 2022 | Centurion RC 100 | Bedford, United Kingdom | | |
| 6 hours (track) | 98.496 km+ | Aleksandr Sorokin | 23 April 2022 | Centurion RC 100 | Bedford, United Kingdom | | |
| 100 km (track) | 6:05:41 | Aleksandr Sorokin | 23 April 2022 | Centurion RC 100 | Bedford, United Kingdom | | |
| 100 km (road) | 6:05:35 | Aleksandr Sorokin | 14 May 2023 | Nord Security World's Fastest Run | Vilnius, Lithuania | | |
| 100 km (road) | 6:04:10# (Note: Non-ratifiable as the athlete ran behind a car, wore unratified prototype shoes, and was paced by rotating pacemakers) | Aleksandr Sorokin | 26 August 2025 | Chasing 100 | Nardò Ring, Italy | | |
| 150 km (track) | 10:27:48+ | Aleksandr Sorokin | 24 April 2021 | Centurion Running Track 100 Mile | Ashford, United Kingdom | | |
| 100 miles (track) | 11:14:56+ | Aleksandr Sorokin | 24 April 2021 | Centurion Running Track 100 Mile | Ashford, United Kingdom | | |
| 100 miles (road) | 10:51:39+ | Aleksandr Sorokin | 6 January 2022 | Spartanion Race | Tel Aviv, Israel | | |
| 12 hours (track) | 170.309 km | Aleksandr Sorokin | 24 April 2021 | Centurion Running Track 100 Mile | Ashford, United Kingdom | | |
| 12 hours (road) | 177.410 km | Aleksandr Sorokin | 6 January 2022 | Spartanion Race | Tel Aviv, Israel | | |
| 24 hours (road) | 319.614 km | Aleksandr Sorokin | 18 September 2022 | IAU 24 Hour European Championships | Verona, Italy | | |
| 110 m hurdles | 13.60 (−0.8 m/s) | Jonas Jakštys | 17 July 1987 | | Bryansk, Soviet Union | | |
| 110 m hurdles | 13.55 (Note: doubtful wind-reading) | Jonas Jakštys | 8 June 1986 | | Leningrad, Soviet Union | | |
| 200 m hurdles | 24.3 | Petras Jonaitis | 1964 | | | | |
| 400 m hurdles | 50.39 | Silvestras Guogis | 21 July 2012 | Nordic-Baltic U23 Championships | Jessheim, Norway | | |
| 400 m hurdles | 50.1 h | Rimantas Jurevičius | 20 August 1984 | | Gorky, Soviet Union | | |
| 3000 m steeplechase | 8:22.2 | Vladimiras Dudinas | 19 August 1969 | | Kiev, Soviet Union | | |
| High jump | 2.34 m | Rolandas Verkys | 16 June 1991 | | Warsaw, Poland | | |
| Pole vault | 5.40 m | Zigmas Biliūnas | 21 August 1981 | | Vilnius, Soviet Union | | |
| Long jump | 8.15 m (+0.5 m/s) | Povilas Mykolaitis | 4 June 2011 | LLAF Cup | Kaunas, Lithuania | | |
| Triple jump | 17.29 m (+0.7 m/s) | Audrius Raizgys | 23 July 1995 | | Vilnius, Lithuania | | |
| Shot put | 21.10 m | Donatas Stukonis | 20 July 1985 | | Kaunas, Soviet Union | | |
| Discus throw | 75.56 m | Mykolas Alekna | 13 April 2025 | Oklahoma Throws Series World Invitational | Ramona, United States | | |
| Hammer throw | 82.24 m | Benjaminas Viluckis | 21 August 1986 | | Klaipėda, Soviet Union | | |
| Javelin throw | 89.17 m | Edis Matusevičius | 27 July 2019 | Lithuanian Championships | Palanga, Lithuania | | |
| Decathlon | 8437 pts | Rišardas Malachovskis | 1–2 July 1988 | | Minsk, Soviet Union | | |
| Decathlon | 100m (wind) / Long jump (wind) / Shot put / High jump / 400m / 110m H (wind) / Discus / Pole vault / Javelin / 1500m; 10.93 / 7.04 m / 14.94 m / 2.09 m / 47.77 / 14.34 / 44.04 m / 4.90 m / 59.58 m / 4:13.67 | | | | | | |
| 1500 m walk (track) | 5:12.0+ WB | Antanas Grigaliūnas | 12 May 1990 | | Vilnius, Lithuania | | |
| Mile walk (track) | 5:36.9 | Antanas Grigaliūnas | 12 May 1990 | | Vilnius, Lithuania | | |
| 3000 m walk (track) | 10:59.80 | Valdas Kazlauskas | 1989 | | Bratislava, Czechoslovakia | | |
| 3 km walk (road) | 11:38 | Tadas Šuškevičius | 2006 | | Alytus, Lithuania | | |
| Two miles walk (track) | 12:01.8 | Rytis Arbačiauskas | 1990 | | Vilnius, Lithuania | | |
| 5000 m walk (track) | 19:02.44 | Valdas Kazlauskas | 1989 | | Bratislava, Czechoslovakia | | |
| 5 km walk (road) | 18:24 | Valdas Kazlauskas | 1990 | | Hildesheim, Germany | | |
| 10,000 m walk (track) | 39:18.0 | Valdas Kazlauskas | 18 September 1983 | | Moscow, Soviet Union | | |
| 10 km walk (road) | 38:34 | Valdas Kazlauskas | 1989 | | Hildesheim, Germany | | |
| 15,000 m walk (track) | 59:00.0 | Valdas Kazlauskas | 1983 | | Moscow, Soviet Union | | |
| 15 km walk (road) | 59:04 | Valdas Kazlauskas | 1989 | | Sochi, Soviet Union | | |
| 20,000 m walk (track) | 1:20:37 | Valdas Kazlauskas | 1983 | | Moscow, Soviet Union | | |
| 20 km walk (road) | 1:19:29 | Valdas Kazlauskas | 19 February 1989 | | Sochi, Soviet Union | | |
| 25 km walk (road) | 1:55:03+ | Tadas Šuškevičius | 16 February 2014 | Spanish Racewalking Championships | Murcia, Spain | | |
| 30 km walk (road) | 2:09:05 | Viktoras Meškauskas | 1991 | | Druskininkai, Lithuania | | |
| 30,000 m walk (track) | 2:12:03 | Gintaras Andriuškevičius | 2001 | | Alytus, Lithuania | | |
| 35 km walk (road) | 2:34:16 | Marius Žiūkas | 24 July 2022 | World Championships | Eugene, United States | | |
| 50 km walk (road) | 3:48:24 | Arturas Mastianica | 20 March 2021 | Dudinská Päťdesiatka | Dudince, Slovakia | | |
| 70 km walk (road) | 5:59:40 | Algirdas Šakalys | 1979 | | Klaipėda, Soviet Union | | |
| Hour walk (track) | 15127 m | Valdas Kazlauskas | 1983 | | Moscow, Soviet Union | | |
| Two hours walk (track) | 27406 m | Gintaras Andriuškevičius | 2001 | | Alytus, Lithuania | | |
| 4 × 100 m relay | 39.81 | Lithuania; Egidijus Dilys; Rytis Sakalauskas; Žilvinas Adomavičius; Aivaras Pranckevičius | 12 July 2009 | Universiade | Belgrade, Serbia | | |
| 4 × 200 m relay | 1:25.6 h | Lithuanian SSR; A. Ziuskovas; Rimvydas Aukštuolis; V. Pavilonis; R. Valiulis | 3 June 1979 | | Vilnius, Soviet Union | | |
| 4 × 400 m relay | 3:09.65 | Lithuania; Einius Trumpa; Matas Janarauskas; Lukas Sutkus; Tomas Keršulis | 7 July 2023 | SC "Cosma" Summer Cup | Vilnius, Lithuania | | |

=== Women ===
| Event | Record | Athlete | Date | Meet | Place | Ref. |
|---|---|---|---|---|---|---|
| 100 y | 10.69+ (−0.6 m/s) | Lina Grinčikaitė | 27 May 2010 | Golden Spike Ostrava | Ostrava, Czech Republic | |
| 100 m | 11.19 (+1.5 m/s) | Lina Grinčikaitė | 3 August 2012 | Olympic Games | London, United Kingdom | |
| 200 m | 22.99 (+1.3 m/s) | Agnė Šerkšnienė | 14 July 2018 | Swiss Championships | Zofingen, Switzerland | |
| 200 m | 22.7 h | Irena Oženko | 13 May 1989 | | Tashkent, Soviet Union | |
| 300 m | 36.74 | Agnė Šerkšnienė | 12 May 2018 | Hürden und Sprintmeeting | Basel, Switzerland | |
| 400 m | 50.49 | Modesta Morauskaitė | 25 May 2022 | Meeting Iberoamerica | Huelva, Spain | |
| 500 m | 1:08.9 h | Ana Ambrazienė | 1991 | | | |
| 800 m | 1:56.7 h | Dalia Matusevičienė | 25 June 1988 | | Kiev, Soviet Union | |
| 1000 m | 2:32.3 h | Laimutė Baikauskaitė | 12 September 1985 | | Podolsk, Soviet Union | |
| 1500 m | 3:59.74 | Gabija Galvydytė | 16 May 2026 | Shanghai Diamond League | Shaoxing, China | |
| 2000 m | 5:45.72 | Stefanija Statkuvienė | 1990 | | | |
| 3000 m | 8:39.25 | Regina Čistiakova | 6 July 1986 | | Moscow, Soviet Union | |
| 5000 m | 15:28.66 | Inga Juodeškienė | 5 August 2000 | KBC Night of Athletics | Heusden, Netherlands | |
| 5 km (road) | 15:49 | Regina Čistiakova | 8 May 1994 | | Darmstadt, Germany | |
| 4 miles (road) | 20:45 | Stefania Statkuvienė | 14 June 1997 | | Peoria, United States | |
| 8 km (road) | 26:04+ | Živilė Balčiūnaitė | 9 August 2003 | | Chambersburg, United States | |
| 10,000 m | 32:30.48 | Živilė Balčiūnaitė | 14 June 2005 | | Tula, Russia | |
| 10 km (road) | 32:37 | Stefania Statkuvienė | 29 March 1992 | | Brunssum, Netherlands | |
| 15 km (road) | 50:13+ | Živilė Balčiūnaitė | 19 November 2006 | Tokyo International Marathon | Tokyo, Japan | |
| 10 miles (road) | 55:53 | Živilė Balčiūnaitė | 24 August 2002 | | Flint, United States | |
| 20 km (road) | 1:07:41+ | Živilė Balčiūnaitė | 19 November 2006 | Tokyo International Marathon | Tokyo, Japan | |
| Half marathon | 1:10:23 | Živilė Balčiūnaitė | 6 November 2005 | | Budapest, Hungary | |
| 30 km (road) | 1:44:18+ | Živilė Balčiūnaitė | 19 November 2006 | Tokyo International Marathon | Tokyo, Japan | |
| Marathon | 2:25:15 | Živilė Balčiūnaitė | 20 November 2005 | | Tokyo, Japan | |
| 50 km (road) | 3:25:39 | Gitana Akmanavičiūtė | 3 July 2022 | | Alytus, Lithuania | |
| 100 km (road) | 7:34:05 | Gitana Akmanavičiūtė | 14 May 2023 | | Vilnius, Lithuania | |
| 24 hours | 195.199 km | Viktorija Tomaševičienė | 22 October 2016 | European Championships | Albi, France | |
| 100 m hurdles | 12.87 (+1.3 m/s) (Note: record set during heptathlon competition) | Beatričė Juškevičiūtė | 18 May 2024 | Hypo-Meeting | Götzis, Austria | |
| 200 m hurdles | 28.0 h | Nijolė Kvietkauskaitė | 1974 | | | |
| 400 m hurdles | 54.02 | Ana Ambraziene | 11 June 1983 | | Moscow, Soviet Union | |
| 2000 m steeplechase | 6:22.03 | Stefanija Statkuvienė | 25 July 1989 | | Nizhny Novgorod, Soviet Union | |
| 3000 m steeplechase | 9:26.88 | Greta Karinauskaitė | 27 May 2023 | | Sacramento, United States | |
| High jump | 1.98 m (Note: indoor mark ratified as absolute record) | Airinė Palšytė | 27 July 2014 | Lithuanian Championships | Kaunas, Lithuania | |
| High jump | 1.98 m | Airinė Palšytė | 24 August 2014 | Internationales Hochsprung-Meeting Eberstadt | Eberstadt, Germany | |
| Pole vault | 4.57 m | Rugilė Miklyčiūtė | 27 June 2026 | Someron Seiväskarnevaalit | Somero, Finland | |
| Long jump | 7.20 m (+2.0 m/s) | Irena Oženko | 12 September 1986 | | Budapest, Hungary | |
| Triple jump | 14.43 m (+1.8 m/s) | Diana Zagainova | 30 June 2019 | Resisprint International | La Chaux-de-Fonds, Switzerland | |
| Shot put | 20.27 m | Danguolė Bimbaitė | 13 May 1987 | | Leselidze, Soviet Union | |
| Discus throw | 72.14 m | Galina Murašova | 17 August 1984 | | Prague, Czechoslovakia | |
| Hammer throw | 66.09 m | Agnė Lukoševičiūtė | 9 May 2021 | USATF Golden Games | Walnut, United States | |
| Javelin throw | 63.98 m | Liveta Jasiūnaitė | 15 June 2019 | Baltic Team Championships | Ogre, Latvia | |
| Heptathlon | 6604 pts | Remigija Nazarovienė | 10–11 June 1989 | | Brjansk, Soviet Union | |
| Heptathlon | 100m H (wind) / High jump / Shot put / 200m (wind) / Long jump (wind) / Javelin / 800m; 13.26 / 1.86 m / 14.27 m / 24.12 / 6.58 m / 40.94 m / 2:09.98 | | | | | |
| Decathlon | 8358 pts WB | Austra Skujytė | 14–15 April 2005 | | Columbia, United States | |
| Decathlon | 100m (wind) / Discus / Pole vault / Javelin / 400m / 100m H (wind) / Long jump (wind) / Shot put / High jump / 1500m; 12.49 / 46.19 m / 3.10 m / 48.78 m / 57.19 / 14.22 / 6.12 m / 16.42 m / 1.78 m / 5:15.86 | | | | | |
| 1500 m walk (track) | 5:53.0 h | Sada Eidikytė | 1990 | | Vilnius, Lithuania | |
| Mile walk (track) | 6:19.40 | Sada Eidikytė | 1990 | | Vilnius, Lithuania | |
| 3000 m walk (track) | 12:05.72 | Brigita Virbalytė-Dimšienė | 2 June 2018 | Lithuanian Students Championships | Utena, Lithuania | |
| 3 km walk (road) | 12:19 | Sonata Milušauskaitė | 1999 | | Hildesheim, Germany | |
| Two miles walk (track) | 13:48.8 h | Sada Eidikytė | 1990 | | Vilnius, Lithuania | |
| 5000 m walk (track) | 21:17.8 h | Brigita Virbalytė-Dimšienė | 17 May 2014 | SWE-LTU-LAT-EST Team Match | Valga, Estonia | |
| 5 km walk (road) | 20:53 | Sada Eidikytė | 10 June 1989 | | Hildesheim, Germany | |
| 10,000 m walk (track) | 44:17.35 | Sonata Milušauskaitė | 31 July 2004 | | Lisbon, Portugal | |
| 10 km walk (road) | 42:43 | Brigita Virbalytė-Dimšienė | 5 September 2015 | | Katowice, Poland | |
| 15,000 m walk (track) | 1:11:59.0 | Kristina Saltanovič | 2000 | | Kaunas, Lithuania | |
| 15 km walk (road) | 1:05:56+ | Živilė Vaiciukevičiūtė | 11 August 2018 | European Championships | Berlin, Germany | |
| 20,000 m walk (track) | 1:35:23.67 | Kristina Saltanovič | 3 August 2000 | Lithuanian Championships | Kaunas, Lithuania | |
| 20 km walk (road) | 1:27:59 | Brigita Virbalytė-Dimšienė | 11 August 2018 | European Championships | Berlin, Germany | |
| 25 km walk (road) | 2:13:29+ | Neringa Aidietytė | 2006 | | Ivano-Frankivsk, Ukraine | |
| 30 km walk (road) | 2:39:55+ | Neringa Aidietytė | 2006 | | Ivano-Frankivsk, Ukraine | |
| 50 km walk (road) | 4:25:21 | Brigita Virbalytė-Dimšienė | 17 October 2010 | | Scanzorosciate, Italy | |
| 4 × 100 m relay | 43.95 | Lithuania; Edita Lingytė; Lina Grinčikaitė; Sonata Tamošaitytė; Audra Dagelytė | 5 July 2008 | | Madrid, Spain | |
| Swedish relay | 2:09.1 h | Lithuanian SSR; Nijolė Medvedeva; Laimutė Juchnevičienė ??? ??? | 1981 | | | |
| 4 × 400 m relay | 3:27.54 | Lithuanian SSR; Margarita Navickaitė; Teresa Valiulienė; Aldona Mendzarytė; Ana Ambrazienė | 22 June 1983 | | Moscow, Soviet Union | |
| 4 × 800 m relay | 7:58.5 h | Lithuanian SSR; Ana Ambrazienė; Danguolė Bislytė; Laima Juknavičienė; Laimutė Baikauskaitė | 8 September 1980 | | Donetsk, Soviet Union | |

=== Mixed ===
| Event | Record | Athlete | Date | Meet | Place | Ref. |
|---|---|---|---|---|---|---|
| 4 × 100 m relay | 41.28 | Lithuania; Lukrecija Sabaitytė; Ema Rupšytė; Adas Dambrauskas; Gediminas Truskauskas | 24 June 2026 | Jerusalem Grand Slam | Jerusalem, Israel | |
| 4 × 400 m relay | 3:15.95 | Lithuania; Lukas Sutkus; Ema Sarafinaitė; Tomas Keršulis; Modesta Justė Morauskaitė | 22 June 2023 | European Team Championships | Chorzów, Poland | |

== Indoor ==
=== Men ===
| Event | Record | Athlete | Date | Meet | Place | Ref. |
|---|---|---|---|---|---|---|
| 50 m | 5.78+ | Rytis Sakalauskas | 14 February 2012 | Meeting Pas de Calais | Liévin, France | |
| 60 m | 6.62 | Kastytis Klimas | 10 January 1993 | | Rødovre, Denmark | |
| 60 m | 6.62 | Adas Dambrauskas | 8 March 2025 | European Championships | Apeldoorn, Netherlands | |
| 60 m | 6.4 h | Andrius Kornikas | 26 February 1983 | | Vilnius, Soviet Union | |
| 60 m | 6.4 h | Kastytis Klimas | 14 January 1989 | | Vilnius, Soviet Union | |
| 60 m | 6.4 h | Eimantas Skrabulis | 14 February 1989 | | Klaipėda, Soviet Union | |
| 60 m | 6.4 h | Vilmantas Pipiras | 8 January 1992 | | Kaunas, Lithuania | |
| 100 m | 10.58 | Rytis Sakalauskas | 27 February 2010 | Florø Indoor Games | Florø, Norway | |
| 150 m | 15.53 OT | Rytis Sakalauskas | 11 February 2010 | Botnia Games | Korsholm, Finland | |
| 200 m | 21.05 | Tomas Keršulis | 11 February 2023 | David Hemery Valentine Invitational | Boston, United States | |
| 200 m | 20.98 | Gediminas Truskauskas | 15 February 2025 | Bassen Sprint | Bærum, Norway | |
| 300 m | 32.88 | Tomas Keršulis | 3 December 2022 | Greg Page Relays | Ithaca, United States | |
| 400 m | 45.78 | Tomas Keršulis | 11 February 2023 | David Hemery Valentine Invitational | Boston, United States | |
| 600 m | 1:17.20 | Vitalij Kozlov | 7 February 2010 | Russian Winter Meeting | Moscow, Russia | |
| 800 m | 1:48.42 | Vitalij Kozlov | 3 February 2009 | | Vienna, Austria | |
| 1000 m | 2:22.90 | Pavelas Fedorenka | 3 February 1990 | | Chelyabinsk, Soviet Union | |
| 1500 m | 3:38.32 | Simas Bertašius | 3 February 2022 | Czech Indoor Gala | Ostrava, Czech Republic | |
| Mile | 4:10.51 | Darius Gruzdys | 30 January 1999 | | Vilnius, Lithuania | |
| 2000 m | 5:14.58 | Mindaugas Pukštas | 3 February 2001 | | Vilnius, Lithuania | |
| 3000 m | 7:55.0 | Aleksandras Antipovas | 12 February 1978 | | Vilnius, Soviet Union | |
| Two miles | 8:40.70 | Lukas Verzbickas | 13 March 2011 | New Balance Nationals | New York City, United States | |
| 5000 m | 13:45.10 | Mindaugas Pukštas | 15 February 2003 | Tyson Invitational | Fayetteville, United States | |
| 55 m hurdles | 7.40 A | Vytautas Kancleris | 26 February 2000 | | Flagstaff, United States | |
| 60 m hurdles | 7.69 | Mantas Šilkauskas | 21 January 2012 | Wildcat Invitational | Manhattan, United States | |
| 60 m hurdles | 7.5 h | Jonas Jakštys | 29 December 1986 | | Kaunas, Lithuania | |
| 2000 m steeplechase | 5:29.15 | Mindaugas Pukštas | 8 February 2002 | | Kaunas, Lithuania | |
| 3000 m steeplechase | 8:37.0 | Antanas Stančius | 3 March 1988 | | Vilnius, Soviet Union | |
| High jump | 2.28 m | Raivydas Stanys | 31 January 2015 | LLAF Cup | Vilnius, Lithuania | |
| Pole vault | 5.30 m | Zigmas Biliūnas | 4 February 1984 | | Kaunas, Soviet Union | |
| Long jump | 8.13 m | Povilas Mykolaitis | 11 February 2005 | | Kaunas, Lithuania | |
| Triple jump | 17.03 m | Audrius Raizgys | 26 February 1995 | | Panevėžys, Lithuania | |
| Shot put | 20.69 m | Saulius Kleiza | 24 January 1987 | | Kaunas, Soviet Union | |
| Weight throw | 19.85 m | Martynas Šedys | 7 February 2015 | Boston University Scarlet and White | Boston, United States | |
| Heptathlon | 5937 pts | Edgaras Benkunskas | 4–5 February 2023 | Tallinn Indoor Meeting | Tallinn, Estonia | |
| Heptathlon | 60m / Long jump / Shot put / High jump / 60m H / Pole vault / 1000m; 7.07 / 7.03 m / 14.83 m / 2.09 m / 8.16 / 4.83 m / 2:47.54 | | | | | |
| 1500 m walk | 5:19.21 | Rytis Arbačiauskas | 1993 | | Panevėžys, Lithuania | |
| Mile walk | 5:40.2 h | Rytis Arbačiauskas | 1993 | | Panevėžys, Lithuania | |
| 3000 m walk | 10:56.30 | Marius Žiukas | 25 February 2018 | Glasgow Grand Prix | Glasgow, United Kingdom | |
| Two miles walk | 11:54.50 WB | Valdas Kazlauskas | 24 February 1990 | | Kaunas, Soviet Union | |
| 5000 m walk | 18:48.8 h | Valdas Kazlauskas | 9 February 1992 | | Kaunas, Lithuania | |
| 10,000 m walk | 39:38.6 h | Valdas Kazlauskas | 25 February 1980 | | Moscow, Soviet Union | |
| 15,000 m walk | 1:00:03.9 WB | Valdas Kazlauskas | 24 January 1987 | | Kaunas, Soviet Union | |
| 4 × 200 m relay | 1:28.08 | Lithuania; Sigitas Kavaliauskas; Raimondas Turla; Daunius Šerpytis; Arturas Kulnis | 19 February 2005 | Baltic match | Tallinn, Estonia | |
| 4 × 400 m relay | 3:23.46 | Šiauliai; Darius Bagaslauskas; Mantas Tautkus; Vygantas Juškevičius; Mindaugas Norbutas | 18 February 2006 | Lithuanian Championships | Kaunas, Lithuania | |
| 4 × 800 m relay | 7:52.9 | Klaipėda; Linas Bružas; Egidijus Rupšys; Viktoras Mauricas; Darius Gruzdys | 18 January 2003 | | Klaipėda, Lithuania | |

=== Women ===
| Event | Record | Athlete | Date | Meet | Place | Ref. |
|---|---|---|---|---|---|---|
| 50 m | 6.31 | Agnė Visockaitė | 8 January 2000 | | Saskatoon, Canada | |
| 55 m | 6.75 | Agnė Visockaitė | 25 February 2000 | | Lincoln, United States | |
| 60 m | 7.23 | Agnė Visockaitė | 21 February 2002 | | Kaunas, Lithuania | |
| 60 m | 7.1 h | Elvyra Kotovienė | 21 January 1984 | | Vilnius, Soviet Union | |
| 60 m | 7.1 h | Margarita Butkienė | 4 February 1984 | | Kaunas, Soviet Union | |
| 60 m | 7.1 h | Nijolė Medvedeva | 24 January 1987 | | Kaunas, Soviet Union | |
| 60 m | 7.1 h | Audra Dagelytė | 22 December 2004 | | Panevėžys, Lithuania | |
| 150 m | 17.82 | Agnė Visockaitė | 16 January 1999 | | Champaign, United States | |
| 200 m | 23.39 | Agnė Visockaitė | 5 March 1999 | World Championships | Maebashi, Japan | |
| 300 m | 37.62 | Modesta Morauskaitė | 29 January 2025 | GP Jyväskylä | Jyväskylä, Finland | |
| 400 m | 51.63 | Modesta Morauskaitė | 2 March 2022 | Villa de Madrid Indoor Meeting | Madrid, Spain | |
| 600 m | 1:27.70 | Dalia Matusevičienė | 21 February 1988 | | Moscow, Soviet Union | |
| 800 m | 2:01.07 | Gabija Galvydyte | 24 February 2024 | Big 12 Championships | Lubbock, United States | |
| 800 m | 2:00.97 | Gabija Galvydyte | 31 January 2025 | BU John Thomas Terrier Classic | Boston, United States | |
| 1000 m | 2:35.5 h | Laimutė Baikauskaitė | 31 January 1988 | | Vilnius, Soviet Union | |
| 1000 m | 2:35.17 | Gabija Galvydytė | 16 January 2026 | Thane Baker Invitational | Manhattan, United States | |
| 1500 m | 4:08.02 | Laimutė Baikauskaitė | 10 January 1988 | | Volgograd, Soviet Union | |
| 1500 m | 4:05.32+ | Gabija Galvydytė | 15 February 2025 | BU David Hemery Valentine Invitational | Boston, United States | |
| Mile | 4:22.76 | Gabija Galvydytė | 15 February 2025 | BU David Hemery Valentine Invitational | Boston, United States | |
| 2000 m | 5:50.7 h | Laimutė Baikauskaitė | 30 January 1988 | | Vilnius, Soviet Union | |
| 3000 m | 8:46.74 | Regina Čistiakova | 8 February 1986 | | Moscow, Soviet Union | |
| 5000 m | 15:49.06 | Regina Čistiakova | 3 February 1990 | | Chelyabinsk, Soviet Union | |
| 60 m hurdles | 8.03 (Semifinal) | Sonata Tamošaitytė | 10 March 2012 | World Championships | Istanbul, Turkey | |
| 60 m hurdles | 8.03 (Final) | Sonata Tamošaitytė | 10 March 2012 | World Championships | Istanbul, Turkey | |
| 1500 m steeplechase | 4:50.6 h | Rasa Drazdauskaitė | 17 February 2006 | | Kaunas, Lithuania | |
| 1500 m steeplechase | 4:43.86 | Vaida Žūsinaitė | 16 February 2013 | Šiaulių taurė | Šiauliai, Lithuania | |
| High jump | 2.01 m | Airinė Palšytė | 4 March 2017 | European Championships | Belgrade, Serbia | |
| Pole vault | 4.15 m | Rugilė Miklyčiūtė | 8 February 2024 | Kaunas Open Championships | Kaunas, Lithuania | |
| Pole vault | 4.26 m | Rugilė Miklyčiūtė | 23 February 2025 | Lithuanian Championships | Panevėžys, Lithuania | |
| Long jump | 7.01 m | Nijolė Medvedeva | 25 January 1987 | | Vilnius, Soviet Union | |
| Triple jump | 14.13 m | Dovilė Dzindzaletaitė | 8 February 2018 | Meeting Ville de Madrid | Madrid, Spain | |
| Shot put | 19.60 m | Danguolė Bimbaitė-Urbikienė | 25 February 1984 | | Gomel, Soviet Union | |
| Shot put | 20.20 m | Danguolė Bimbaitė-Urbikienė | 18 January 1987 | | Klaipėda, Soviet Union | |
| Pentathlon | 4802 pts | Austra Skujytė | 9 March 2012 | World Championships | Istanbul, Turkey | |
| Pentathlon | 60m H / High jump / Shot put / Long jump / 800m; 8.57 / 1.90 m / 16.26 m / 6.24 m / 2:19.99 | | | | | |
| 1500 m walk | 5:45.79 | Sada Eidikytė | 1993 | | Panevėžys, Lithuania | |
| Mile walk | 6:16.72 WB | Sada Eidikytė | 24 February 1990 | | Kaunas, Soviet Union | |
| Mile walk | 6:14.7 h | Sada Eidikytė | 1993 | | Panevėžys, Lithuania | |
| Two miles walk | 13:29.53 | Sada Eidikytė | 1991 | | Kaunas, Lithuania | |
| 3000 m walk | 12:07.19 | Brigita Virbalytė-Dimšienė | 8 February 2014 | Vienna Indoor Gala | Vienna, Austria | |
| 3000 m walk | 12:07.19 | Brigita Virbalytė-Dimšienė | 22 February 2014 | Lithuanian Championships | Klaipėda, Lithuania | |
| 5000 m walk | 21:23.44 | Brigita Virbalytė-Dimšienė | 21 February 2009 | | Kaunas, Lithuania | |
| 4 × 200 m relay | 1:38.87 | Lithuania; Edita Lingytė; Audra Dagelytė; Jūratė Kudirkaitė; Lina Andrijauskaitė | 19 February 2005 | Baltic match | Tallinn, Estonia | |
| 4 × 400 m relay | 3:43.42 | Lithuania; Edita Kavaliauskienė; Jekaterina Sakovič; Živilė Brokoriūtė; Agnė Orlauskaitė | 8 March 2009 | European Championships | Turin, Italy | |

== See also ==
- List of Baltic records in athletics
- List of Lithuanian records (disambiguation)
