= 1990 Lithuanian Athletics Championships =

The 67th 1990 Lithuanian Athletics Championships were held at 1990.

== Winners ==
Men		Event	Women	
Athlete	Result	Event	Athlete	Result
Eimantas Skrabulis	10,3	100 m	Ilona Karopcikiené	11,6
Eimantas Skrabulis	21,4	200 m	Ilona Karopcikiené	24,0
Ričardas Lazauskas	48,0	400 m	Ana Ambrazienė	52,4
Rolandas Vasiliauskas	1:49.6	800 m	Stefanija Statkuviené	2:01.3
Sergėjus Masalkovas	3:50.7	1500 m	Stefanija Statkuviené	4:12.7
		3000 m	Gyté Nemceviciûté	9:30.5
Vytautas Ežerskis	14:37.2	5000 m		
Romas Sausaitis	30:15.4	10 000 m	Vilija Birbalaité	36:30.19
Raimondas Juodeška	9:15.6	3000 m st.		
Laisvûnas Sankauskas	14.1	110/100 m hurdles	(Latvia) Ludmila Olijara	12.9
(Estonia) Indrek Kaseorg	51.8	400 m hurdles	Margarita Jaseviciené	56,3
Rolandas Verkys	2,20	High jump	(Latvia) Valentīna Gotovska	1,89
(Byelorussian Soviet Socialist Republic) Sergey Kravchenko	7,75	Long jump	Neringa Jakštiené	6,22
(Uzbek Soviet Socialist Republic) Damir Tashpulatov	16,64	Triple jump		
Saulius Kleiza	20,07	Shot put	Danguolė Urbikienė	18,76
Vaclavas Kidykas	64,96	Discus throw	Austra Mikelyté	63,00
Donatas Plungé	78,60	Hammer throw		
Kęstutis Mikša	67,00	Javelin throw	Teresé Nekrošaité	62,96
Tomas Onuškevicius	7752	Hepta/Decathlon	Remigija Nazaroviené	6335
		10 km walk	Rūta Erlingyté	47:35.0
Viktoras Meškauskas	1:24:29.4	20 km walk	Rūta Erlingyté	1:39:30
Kęstutis Jezepcikas	2:13:07	30 km walk		
Kęstutis Jezepcikas	4:03:07	50 km walk		
Romas Sausaitis		Long cross	Regina Cistiakova	
Dainius Virbickas		Short cross	Dalia Matuseviciené	
