= Bertašius =

- Lithuanian surname
- m.: Bertašius
- f.: (unmarried): Bertašiūtė
- f.: (married): Bertašienė

Bertašius is a Lithuanian surname. Notable people with the surname include:

- Algimantas Bertašius (born 1934), Lithuanian engineer, sports historian
- Simas Bertašius (born 1993), Lithuanian middle-distance runner
