= 2000 Lithuanian Athletics Championships =

- Edition: 77th
- Dates: 3–4 July
- Host city: Kaunas, Lithuania
- Level: Senior
- Type: Outdoor

The 2000 Lithuanian Athletics Championships were held at the S. Darius and S. Girėnas Stadium in Kaunas on August 3 and August 4, 2000.

== Men ==
Event	1st place		2nd place		Br3rd placeonze	
100 m	Ilja Andriusenko	10,90	Donatas Jakševičius	10,94	Eugenijus Liubenka	11,08
200 m	Jonas Motiejūnas	21,30	Nerijus Janutis	21,80	Ilja Andriusenko	21,80
400 m	Jonas Motiejūnas	45,40	Raimondas Turla	47,40	Stanislav Michno	48,10
800 m	Mindaugas Norbutas	1:49,9	Vytautas Galvydis	1:51,6	Žydrūnas Mažrimas	1:52,3
1 500 m	Evaldas Martinka	4:00,70	Dainius Kižys	4:01,44	Vytautas Galvydis	4:02,68
5 000 m	Mindaugas Pukštas	14:47,9	Darius Gruzdys	14:49,5	Gediminas Banevičius	15:13,9
10 000 m	Mindaugas Pukštas	30:20,66	Arūnas Balčiūnas	31:29,35	Vytautas Vaitkevičius	32:06,95
4 × 100 m	Klaipėda's team Tomas Piekus; Vasilij Golubev; Raimondas Šeputis; Ilja Andriusenko	42,15	Kaunas's team Mindaugas Pocius; Donatas Jakševičius; Dainius Šerpytis; Nerijus Janutis	42,53	Kaunas's team Tomas Munius; Darius Draudvila; Andrius Karnašnikovas; Sigitas Kavaliauskas	43,69
4 × 400 m	Klaipėda's team Gediminas Būtenis; Viktoras Mauricas; Tadas Šilauskas; Žydrūnas Mažrimas	3:18,7	Vilnius's team Andrius Krištopaitis; Tomas Ališauskas; Paulius Jakubauskas; Jaroslav Liachovskij	3:21,5	Šiauliai's team Audrius Kazilionis; Darius Jankauskas; Donatas Verkys; Tomas Rogožinskas	3:31,3
110 m hurdles	Ridas Karaška	15,10	Andrius Karnašnikovas	15,60	Donatas Verkys	15,90
400 m hurdles	Artūras Marčenko	53,10	Andrius Krištopaitis	54,60	Tomas Ališauskas	54,80
3 000 m steeplechase	Dainius Šaučikovas	9:18.28	Linas Šalkauskas	9:22,43	Mindaugas Tomanas	9:24,10
20000 m walking	Daugvinas Zujus	1:28.52.0	Anatolijus Launikonis	1:30:52.0	Aleksandras Damulevičius	1:32:55.0
Triple Jump	Audrius Raizgys	15,95	Ardydas Nazarovas	15,90	Arinijus Veiknys	15,88
Long Jump	Andrius Daunoravičius	7,66	Arinijus Veiknys	7,27	Vaidotas Augustaitis	7,13
High Jump	Deividas Rinkevičius	2,09	Petras Karpas	2,09	Mantas Šaulys	2,06
Pole Vault	Raimundas Stačkūnas	3,60	Alfonsas Bičkus	3,60	Darius Laurinčikas	3,40
Shot Put	Saulius Kleiza	19,16	Gintautas Degutis	17,33	Tomas Keinys	16,79
Hammer Throw	Dalius Čižauskas	55,93	Edgaras Brinkis	54,71	Modestas Kairiūkštis	47,11
Discus Throw	Virgilijus Alekna	73,88; NR	Romas Ubartas	64,61	Andrius Butrimas	46,36
Javelin Throw	Arūnas Jurkšas	77,58	Aleksandr Kozlov	64,85	Kęstutis Jurša	64,62
Decathlon	Jonas Spudis	6696	Regimantas Kičas	6280		

== Women ==
Event	1st place		2nd place		Br3rd placeonze	
100 m	Audra Dagelytė	11,64	Svetlana Charisova	11,85	Ernesta Paulauskaitė	11,96
200 m	Žana Minina	24,1	Svetlana Charisova	24,9	Danguolė Razmaitė	26,1
400 m	Inesa Kliukoitytė	56,98	Jūratė Kudirkaitė	57,22	Rūta Vilkaitė	58,34
800 m	Vida Bytautienė	2:10.3	Odeta Šidlauskaitė	2:15.4	Nadežda Žolobova	2:16.0
1 500 m	Irina Krakoviak	4:19.83	Inga Gikaraitė	4:43.01	Jūratė Strumskytė	4:45.52
5 000 m	Vilija Birbalaitė	16:23.2	Živilė Balčiūnaitė	16.26.9	Inga Gikaraitė	18:25.7
10 000 m	Živilė Balčiūnaitė	33:04.46	Diana Maciušonytė	34:29.19	Aušra Kavaliauskienė	39:47.67
4 × 100 m	Kaunas's team Adrija Grocienė; Ernesta Paulauskaitė; Aušra Baužytė; Svetlna Charisova	47.51	Šiauliai's team Renata Mareinauskaitė; Laura Balsytė; Milda Buškutė; Danguolė Razmaitė	49.58	Klaipėda's team Tania Valujevič; Ingrida Ališauskaitė; Kristina Serapinaitė; Olesia Zaiko	49.85
4 × 400 m	Vilnius's team Inesa Kliukoitytė; Olga Ziuganova; Žana Minina; Nadežda Žolobova	3:57.0	Kaunas's team Inga Kairytė; Agnė Jakucevičiūtė; Rūta Vilkaitė; Jūratė Kudirkaitė	4:00.3	Šiauliai's team Laura Balsytė; Indrė Vrubliauskaitė; Regina Žvigaitytė; Danguolė Razmaitė	4:05.1
100 m hurdles	Austra Skujytė	14,0	Diana Radavičienė	14,1	Ernesta Paulauskaitė	14,2
400 m hurdles	Inesa Kliukoitytė	1:03.1	Olga Ziuganova	1:06.9	Lina Liutkutė	1:06.9
2 000 m steeplechase	Sandra Stanevičiūtė	6:58.7	Aurelija Ručinskaitė	7:14.8	Daiva Šiuškaitė	7:15.9
20000 m walking	Kristina Saltanovič	1:35:23.67; WR	Sonata Milušauskaitė	1:36:55.88	Jelena Launikonytė	1:50:47.21
Triple Jump	Adrija Grocienė	13,21	Virginija Petkevičienė	13,13	Jolanta Kvetkovskaja	12,05
Long Jump	Adrija Grocienė	5,83	Živilė Šikšnelytė	5,75	Sigita Jurgutytė	5,73
High Jump	Nelė Žilinskienė	1,88	Austra Skujytė	1,85	Agnieška Lisovskaja	1,75
Pole Vault	Rita Snarskaitė	3,10	Edita Grigelionytė	2,90	Algė Vienžindytė	2,60
Shot Put	Rūta Rakštytė	15,27	Rasa Austytė	13,33	Kristina Povilonytė	13,06
Hammer Throw	Laimutė Venclovaitė	40,03	Renata Macytė	39,04	Gintarė Šenauskaitė	38,82
Discus Throw	Renata Gustaitytė	53,42	Kristina Dirmeikytė	41,83	Viktorija Patapova	41,20
Javelin Throw	Rita Ramanauskaitė	61,46	Inga Stasiulionytė	52,76	Indrė Jakubaitytė	52,53
Heptathlon	Viktorija Žemaitytė	4641	Rita Grunskytė	4416	Eurika Baliutavičiūtė	4174

== Medals by city ==
Pl.	City	Gold medal	Silver medal	Bronze medal	Total
1	Kaunas	21	16	12	49
2	Vilnius	12	11	10	33
3	Klaipėda	5	3	6	14
4	Šiauliai	2	5	5	12
5	Panevėžys	1	3	4	8
6	Birštonas	1	1	1	3
7	Naujoji Akmenė	1	0	0	1
7	Kelmė	1	0	0	1
9	Švenčionys	0	1	1	2
9	Kretinga	0	1	1	2
11	Prienai	0	1	0	1
11	Palanga	0	1	0	1
11	Marijampolė	0	1	0	1
14	Alytus	0	0	1	1
14	Kaišiadorys	0	0	1	1
