= LLAF Cup =

Lithuanian athletics competition

LLAF Cup (Lithuanian: LLAF taurė) is an annual track and field event in Lithuania organized by the Lithuanian Athletics Federation (Lithuanian: Lietuvos lengvosios atletikos federacija or LLAF). All Lithuanian athletics clubs are competing in the championship. Team that won most titles is Cosma from capital city of Vilnius. The LLAF Cup is also national championship for decathlon and heptathlon.

== Championships ==
Year	Date	City	Stadium	Winning club
2010 LLAF Cup	4–5 June	Kaunas	S. Darius and S. Girėnas Stadium	„Cosma“
2009 LLAF Cup	5–6 June	Šiauliai		„Cosma“
2008 LLAF Cup	30–31 May	Kaunas	S. Darius and S. Girėnas Stadium	„Cosma“
2007 LLAF Cup	3–4 June	Kaunas	S. Darius and S. Girėnas Stadium	„Atletas“
2006 LLAF Cup	2–3 June	Kaunas	S. Darius and S. Girėnas Stadium	„Atletas“
2005 LLAF Cup	3–4 June	Kaunas	S. Darius and S. Girėnas Stadium	
2004 LLAF Cup	4–5 June	Kaunas	S. Darius and S. Girėnas Stadium	
2003 LLAF Cup	6–7 June	Kaunas	LKKA indoor arena	
2002 LLAF Cup	4 June	Kaunas		
2001 LLAF Cup	7–8 June	Kaunas		
