= Regina Chistyakova =

Personal information
- Nationality: Lithuanian
- Born: Regina Čistiakova; 7 November 1961 (age 64) Tytuvėnai, Soviet Union

Sport
- Country: Lithuania; Soviet Union (until 1993)
- Sport: Athletics
- Events: 1500 metres 3000 metres

Achievements and titles
- Personal bests: 1500 m: 4:05.96 (1988); 3000 m: 8:39.25 NR (1986)
Medal record
Representing Soviet Union
European Indoor Championships
Bronze medal – third place	1986 Madrid	3000 m
Summer Universiade
Bronze medal – third place	1989 Duisburg	3000 m

Regina Chistyakova (née Nyderytė; born 7 November 1961) is a Lithuanian former distance runner, who competed at distances from 1500 metres up to 10,000 metres. Her highest individual honours were three bronze medals in the 3000 metres at the 1986 Goodwill Games, 1986 European Athletics Indoor Championships, and the 1989 Summer Universiade.

She helped the Soviet women's team to three straight titles at the IAAF World Cross Country Championships between 1988 and 1990, teaming with Yelena Romanova, Marina Rodchenkova, Olga Bondarenko, Nadezhda Stepanova, and Natalya Sorokivskaya among others. She also helped the Soviets win the Yokohama International Women's Ekiden in 1988 and 1990. At national level, she was the Soviet national champion in the 3000 m in 1986.

She later went on to win four distance running titles at the Lithuanian Athletics Championships and was twice 3000 m champion at the Lithuanian Indoor Athletics Championships. She competed internationally for Lithuania at the 1993 World Championships in Athletics, the 1994 European Cross Country Championships, 1995 IAAF World Cross Country Championships, and the 2009 World Masters Athletics Championships. She topped the field in the 1500 m and 3000 m for Lithuania in the C Final of the European Cup.

Chistyakova was born in Tytuvėnai in the Lithuanian SSR of the Soviet Union, one of nine children in her family. She graduated with a bachelor's degree in physical education from the Lithuanian University of Educational Sciences in 1993. She married fellow athlete Alexander Chistiakov and has a son, also called Alexander. A resident of Vilnius, she was a long-list candidate for the Order and Justice Party in the 2016 Seimas elections.

Among her outings on the professional circuit, she won the Cross der Vlaanderen in 1990, and the Silvesterlauf München and Neusser Sommernachtslauf in 1993. She had top three finishes at the Cross Zornotza and Brothers Znamensky Memorial meets. She holds the Baltic records and Lithuanian records for the outdoor 3000 m and indoor 5000 metres with her bests of 8:39.25 minutes and 15:49.06 minutes, respectively.

== International competitions ==
Year	Competition	Venue	Position	Event	Notes
1986	European Indoor Championships	Madrid, Spain	3rd	3000 m	9:01.72
1986	Goodwill Games	Moscow, Soviet Union	3rd	3000 m	8:39.25
1988	World Cross Country Championships	Auckland, New Zealand	7th	Senior race	19:41
1988	World Cross Country Championships	Auckland, New Zealand	1st	Team	51 pts
1988	Yokohama International Women's Ekiden	Yokohama, Japan	1st	5K (6th leg)	16:29
1988	Yokohama International Women's Ekiden	Yokohama, Japan	1st	Team	2:15:41
1989	World Cross Country Championships	Stavanger, Norway	27th	Senior race	23:36
1989	World Cross Country Championships	Stavanger, Norway	1st	Team	58 pts
1989	Universiade	Duisburg, West Germany	3rd	3000 m	8:55.73
1990	World Cross Country Championships	Aix-les-Bains, France	13th	Senior race	19:52
1990	World Cross Country Championships	Aix-les-Bains, France	1st	Team	37 pts
1990	Yokohama International Women's Ekiden	Yokohama, Japan	2nd	5K (6th leg)	15:30
1990	Yokohama International Women's Ekiden	Yokohama, Japan	1st	Team	2:16:41
1993	European Cup C Final	Copenhagen, Denmark	1st	1500 m	4:14.55
1993	European Cup C Final	Copenhagen, Denmark	1st	3000 m	9:08.45
1993	World Championships	Stuttgart, Germany	9th (heats)	3000 m	8:58.51
1994	European Cup	Valencia, Spain	6th	3000 m	9:19.96
1994	European Cross Country Championships	Alnwick, United Kingdom	60th	Senior race	15:55
1995	World Cross Country Championships	Durham, United Kingdom	57th	Senior race	21:47
2009	World Masters Championships	Lahti, Finland	5th	5000 m	18:54.13
2009	World Masters Championships	Lahti, Finland	10th	10,000 m	40:02.37

== National titles ==
- Soviet Athletics Championships
  - 3000 m: 1986
- Lithuanian Athletics Championships
  - 1500 m: 1993
  - 3000 m: 1991, 1993
  - Cross country long race: 1990
- Lithuanian Indoor Athletics Championships
  - 3000 m: 1991, 1995

== See also ==
- List of European Athletics Indoor Championships medalists (women)
