= List of Lithuanian records in Olympic weightlifting =

The following are the national records in Olympic weightlifting in Lithuania. Records are maintained in each weight class for the snatch lift, clean & jerk lift, and the total for both lifts by the Weightlifting Federation of Lithuania (Lietuvos sunkiosios atletikos federacija).

== Current records ==
Key to tables: Awaiting ratification Not ratified or later rescinded by Weightlifting Federation of Lithuania

=== Men ===
Event	Record	Athlete	Date	Meet	Place	Ref
60 kg
Snatch	92 kg	Rasvydas Asijavičius	8 June 2025	Lithuanian Championships	Telšiai, Lithuania	
Clean & Jerk	118 kg	Rasvydas Asijavičius	8 June 2025	Lithuanian Championships	Telšiai, Lithuania	
Total	210 kg	Rasvydas Asijavičius	8 June 2025	Lithuanian Championships	Telšiai, Lithuania	
65 kg
Snatch	95 kg	Rasvydas Asijavičius	6 December 2025	Lithuanian Team Championships	Šilutė, Lithuania	
Clean & Jerk	119 kg	Rasvydas Asijavičius	22 November 2025		Druskininkai, Lithuania	
Total	212 kg	Rasvydas Asijavičius	22 November 2025		Druskininkai, Lithuania	
70 kg
Snatch	93 kg	Vilius Razmas	27 June 2026	Lithuanian Championships	Druskininkai, Lithuania	
Clean & Jerk	114 kg	Anicetas Čeponis	27 June 2026	Lithuanian Championships	Druskininkai, Lithuania	
Total	207 kg	Tadas Statkevičius	27 June 2026	Lithuanian Championships	Druskininkai, Lithuania	
75 kg
Snatch	110 kg	Vincentas Skirka	27 June 2026	Lithuanian Championships	Druskininkai, Lithuania	
Clean & Jerk	131 kg	Gytis Jančauskis	27 June 2026	Lithuanian Championships	Druskininkai, Lithuania	
Total	240 kg	Gytis Jančauskis	27 June 2026	Lithuanian Championships	Druskininkai, Lithuania	
85 kg
Snatch	147 kg	Irmantas Kačinskis	2 November 2026	World Championships	Ningbo, China	
Clean & Jerk	174 kg	Irmantas Kačinskis	2 November 2026	World Championships	Ningbo, China	
Total	321 kg	Irmantas Kačinskis	2 November 2026	World Championships	Ningbo, China	
95 kg
Snatch	155 kg	Lukas Kordušas	4 November 2026	World Championships	Ningbo, China	
Clean & Jerk	186 kg	Lukas Kordušas	4 November 2026	World Championships	Ningbo, China	
Total	341 kg	Lukas Kordušas	4 November 2026	World Championships	Ningbo, China	
110 kg
Snatch	162 kg	Neilas Gineikis	19 October 2026	European U23 Championships	Durrës, Albania	
Clean & Jerk	192 kg	Neilas Gineikis	19 October 2026	European U23 Championships	Durrës, Albania	
Total	354 kg	Neilas Gineikis	19 October 2026	European U23 Championships	Durrës, Albania	
+110 kg
Snatch	166 kg	Barkus Deivydas	19 October 2026	European U23 Championships	Durrës, Albania	
Clean & Jerk	220 kg	Karolis Stonkus	7 November 2026	World Championships	Ningbo, China	
Total	380 kg	Karolis Stonkus	7 November 2026	World Championships	Ningbo, China	

=== Women ===
Event	Record	Athlete	Date	Meet	Place	Ref
49 kg
Snatch	42 kg	Brigita Remėzaitė	27 June 2026	Lithuanian Championships	Druskininkai, Lithuania	
Clean & Jerk	55 kg	Brigita Remėzaitė	27 June 2026	Lithuanian Championships	Druskininkai, Lithuania	
Total	97 kg	Brigita Remėzaitė	27 June 2026	Lithuanian Championships	Druskininkai, Lithuania	
53 kg
Snatch	52 kg	Agneta Dotaitė	27 June 2026	Lithuanian Championships	Druskininkai, Lithuania	
Clean & Jerk	64 kg	Agneta Dotaitė	27 June 2026	Lithuanian Championships	Druskininkai, Lithuania	
Total	116 kg	Agneta Dotaitė	27 June 2026	Lithuanian Championships	Druskininkai, Lithuania	
57 kg
Snatch	57 kg	Austėja Masiulytė	26 September 2026	Lithuanian Youth Championships	Panevėžys, Lithuania	
Clean & Jerk	70 kg	Austėja Masiulytė	27 June 2026	Lithuanian Championships	Druskininkai, Lithuania	
Total	126 kg	Austėja Masiulytė	27 June 2026	Lithuanian Championships	Druskininkai, Lithuania	
61 kg
Snatch	60 kg	Giedrė Vilkaitytė	27 June 2026	Lithuanian Championships	Druskininkai, Lithuania	
Clean & Jerk	81 kg	Giedrė Vilkaitytė	27 June 2026	Lithuanian Championships	Druskininkai, Lithuania	
Total	141 kg	Giedrė Vilkaitytė	27 June 2026	Lithuanian Championships	Druskininkai, Lithuania	
69 kg
Snatch	92 kg	Lijana Jakaitė	22 April 2026	European Championships	Batumi, Georgia	
Clean & Jerk	114 kg	Lijana Jakaitė	3 November 2026	World Championships	Ningbo, China	
Total	204 kg	Lijana Jakaitė	3 November 2026	World Championships	Ningbo, China	
77 kg
Snatch	100 kg	Gintarė Bražaitė	23 April 2026	European Championships	Batumi, Georgia	
Clean & Jerk	124 kg	Gintarė Bražaitė	5 November 2026	World Championships	Ningbo, China	
Total	221 kg	Gintarė Bražaitė	23 April 2026	European Championships	Batumi, Georgia	
86 kg
Snatch	97 kg	Gintarė Bražaitė	11 September 2026		Panevėžys, Lithuania	
Clean & Jerk	117 kg	Gintarė Bražaitė	11 September 2026		Panevėžys, Lithuania	
Total	214 kg	Gintarė Bražaitė	11 September 2026		Panevėžys, Lithuania	
+86 kg
Snatch	84 kg	Indrėja Rimdžiūtė	27 June 2026	Lithuanian Championships	Druskininkai, Lithuania	
Clean & Jerk	100 kg	Indrėja Rimdžiūtė	9 November 2025		Panevėžys, Lithuania	
Total	180 kg	Indrėja Rimdžiūtė	27 June 2026	Lithuanian Championships	Druskininkai, Lithuania	

== Historical records ==
=== Men (2018–2025) ===
Event	Record	Athlete	Date	Meet	Place	Ref
55 kg
Snatch	90 kg	Standard				
Clean & Jerk	105 kg	Standard				
Total	195 kg	Standard				
61 kg
Snatch	105 kg	Standard				
Clean & Jerk	125 kg	Standard				
Total	230 kg	Standard				
67 kg
Snatch	115 kg	Standard				
Clean & Jerk	130 kg	Standard				
Total	245 kg	Standard				
73 kg
Snatch	130 kg					
Snatch	130 kg	Žilvinas Žilinskas	4 June 2021	Lithuanian Junior Championships	Klaipėda, Lithuania	
Clean & Jerk	150 kg	Žilvinas Žilinskas	26 May 2021	Junior World Championships	Tashkent, Uzbekistan	
Clean & Jerk	158 kg	Žilvinas Žilinskas	4 June 2021	Lithuanian Junior Championships	Klaipėda, Lithuania	
Total	280 kg					
Total	288 kg	Žilvinas Žilinskas	4 June 2021	Lithuanian Junior Championships	Klaipėda, Lithuania	
81 kg
Snatch	143 kg	Irmantas Kačinskas	11 December 2022	World Championships	Bogotá, Colombia	
Clean & Jerk	169 kg	Irmantas Kačinskas	11 December 2022	World Championships	Bogotá, Colombia	
Total	312 kg	Irmantas Kačinskas	11 December 2022	World Championships	Bogotá, Colombia	
89 kg
Snatch	160 kg	Standard				
Clean & Jerk	175 kg	Standard				
Clean & Jerk	177 kg	Irmantas Kačinskas	23 September 2019	World Championships	Pattaya, Thailand	
Total	335 kg	Standard				
96 kg
Snatch	165 kg	Standard				
Clean & Jerk	185 kg	Standard				
Total	350 kg	Standard				
102 kg
Snatch	170 kg	Žygimantas Stanulis	3 July 2021	Lithuanian Championships	Telšiai, Lithuania	
Clean & Jerk	201 kg	Žygimantas Stanulis	3 July 2021	Lithuanian Championships	Telšiai, Lithuania	
Total	371 kg	Žygimantas Stanulis	3 July 2021	Lithuanian Championships	Telšiai, Lithuania	
109 kg
Snatch	180 kg	Standard				
Clean & Jerk	195 kg	Arnas Šidiškis	25 September 2019	World Championships	Pattaya, Thailand	
Total	375 kg	Standard				
+109 kg
Snatch	185 kg	Standard				
Clean & Jerk	211 kg	Karolis Stonkus	3 November 2024	European U23 Championships	Raszyn, Poland	
Total	390 kg	Standard				

=== Men (1998–2018) ===
Event	Record	Athlete	Date	Meet	Place	Ref
56 kg
Snatch	88 kg	Svajūnas Aleksiejus	18 September 2012		Košice, Slovakia	
Clean & Jerk	111 kg	Svajūnas Aleksiejus	18 September 2012		Košice, Slovakia	
Total	198 kg	Svajūnas Aleksiejus	18 September 2012		Košice, Slovakia	
62 kg
Snatch	98 kg	Povilas Valskis	12 September 2016	European U15 Championships	Nowy Tomyśl, Poland	
Clean & Jerk	122 kg	Svajūnas Aleksiejus	24 May 2013		Kaliningrad, Russia	
Total	217 kg	Svajūnas Aleksiejus	24 May 2013		Kaliningrad, Russia	
69 kg
Snatch	114 kg	Irmantas Kačinskas	26 May 2011		Klaipėda, Lithuania	
Clean & Jerk	144 kg	Martynas Sasnauskas	30 October 2010		Klaipėda, Lithuania	
Total	257 kg	Martynas Sasnauskas	30 October 2010		Klaipėda, Lithuania	
77 kg
Snatch	145 kg	Konstantinas Gerasimovas	18 September 2005		Gdynia, Poland	
Clean & Jerk	181 kg	Konstantinas Gerasimovas	5 October 2005		Trenčín, Slovakia	
Total	325 kg	Konstantinas Gerasimovas	18 September 2005		Gdynia, Poland	
85 kg
Snatch	165 kg	Donatas Anuškevičius	19 March 2005		Klaipėda, Lithuania	
Clean & Jerk	201 kg	Artūras Skavičius	15 March 2005		Klaipėda, Lithuania	
Total	355 kg	Donatas Anuškevičius	19 March 2005		Klaipėda, Lithuania	
94 kg
Snatch	186 kg	Aurimas Didžbalis	16 October 2015	Lithuanian Championships	Klaipėda, Lithuania	
Clean & Jerk	221 kg	Aurimas Didžbalis	15 April 2015	European Championships	Tbilisi, Georgia	
Total	406 kg	Aurimas Didžbalis	16 October 2015	Lithuanian Championships	Klaipėda, Lithuania	
105 kg
Snatch	191 kg	Ramūnas Vyšniauskas	25 March 2006		Alytus, Lithuania	
Clean & Jerk	231 kg	Ramūnas Vyšniauskas	25 March 2006		Alytus, Lithuania	
Total	422 kg	Ramūnas Vyšniauskas	25 March 2006		Alytus, Lithuania	
+105 kg
Snatch	192 kg	Ramūnas Vyšniauskas	7 March 2009		Panevėžys, Lithuania	
Clean & Jerk	232 kg	Ramūnas Vyšniauskas	7 March 2009		Panevėžys, Lithuania	
Total	424 kg	Ramūnas Vyšniauskas	7 March 2009		Panevėžys, Lithuania	

=== Women (2018–2025) ===
Event	Record	Athlete	Date	Meet	Place	Ref
45 kg
Snatch	45 kg	Brigita Remėzaitė	17 November 2023		Alytus, Lithuania	
Clean & Jerk	56 kg	Brigita Remėzaitė	19 November 2022	Žemaitijos Taurė	Telšiai, Lithuania	
Total	100 kg	Brigita Remėzaitė	19 November 2022	Žemaitijos Taurė	Telšiai, Lithuania	
49 kg
Snatch	50 kg	Standard				
Clean & Jerk	65 kg	Standard				
Total	115 kg	Standard				
55 kg
Snatch	62 kg	Aistė Anciukevičė	13 February 2024	European Championships	Sofia, Bulgaria	
Clean & Jerk	88 kg	Aistė Anciukevičė	September 2024	Masters Weightlifting IMWA World Championships	Rovaniemi, Finland	
Total	150 kg	Aistė Anciukevičė	September 2024	Masters Weightlifting IMWA World Championships	Rovaniemi, Finland	
59 kg
Snatch	65 kg	Aistė Anciukevičė	14 October 2023	Open Baltic Countries Tournament	Klaipėda, Lithuania	
Clean & Jerk	86 kg	Aistė Anciukevičė	29 June 2024	Lithuanian Championships	Klaipėda, Lithuania	
Total	148 kg	Aistė Anciukevičė	14 October 2023	Open Baltic Countries Tournament	Klaipėda, Lithuania	
64 kg
Snatch	75 kg	Standard				
Clean & Jerk	87 kg	Eglė Kundrotaitė	29 June 2024	Lithuanian Championships	Klaipėda, Lithuania	
Total	160 kg	Standard				
71 kg
Snatch	97 kg	Lijana Jakaitė	17 April 2025	European Championships	Chișinău, Moldova	
Clean & Jerk	118 kg	Gintarė Bražaitė	7 April 2021	European Championships	Moscow, Russia	
Total	213 kg	Gintarė Bražaitė	1 June 2022	European Championships	Tirana, Albania	
76 kg
Snatch	100 kg	Gintarė Bražaitė	11 November 2021		Druskininkai, Lithuania	
Clean & Jerk	125 kg	Gintarė Bražaitė	11 December 2023	IWF Grand Prix	Doha, Qatar	
Total	225 kg	Gintarė Bražaitė	11 December 2023	IWF Grand Prix	Doha, Qatar	
81 kg
Snatch	101 kg	Gintarė Bražaitė	23 November 2024		Anykščiai, Lithuania	
Clean & Jerk	126 kg	Gintarė Bražaitė	13 December 2024	World Championships	Manama, Bahrain	
Total	225 kg	Gintarė Bražaitė	19 April 2025	European Championships	Chișinău, Moldova	
87 kg
Snatch	100 kg	Standard				
Clean & Jerk	125 kg	Standard				
Total	225 kg	Standard				
+87 kg
Snatch	100 kg	Standard				
Clean & Jerk	125 kg	Standard				
Total	225 kg	Standard				

=== Women (1998–2018) ===
Event	Record	Athlete	Date	Meet	Place	Ref
–44 kg
Snatch	52 kg	Aleksandra Stepanova	27 August 2007	European Youth Championships	Pavia, Italy	
Clean & Jerk	65 kg	Aleksandra Stepanova	27 August 2007	European Youth Championships	Pavia, Italy	
Total	117 kg	Aleksandra Stepanova	27 August 2007	European Youth Championships	Pavia, Italy	
–48 kg
Snatch	67 kg	Aleksandra Stepanova	29 October 2010		Klaipėda, Lithuania	
Clean & Jerk	86 kg	Aleksandra Stepanova	29 October 2010		Klaipėda, Lithuania	
Total	153 kg	Aleksandra Stepanova	29 October 2010		Klaipėda, Lithuania	
–53 kg
Snatch	68 kg	Aleksandra Stepanova	11 April 2016	European Championships	Førde, Norway	
Clean & Jerk	83 kg	Aleksandra Stepanova	11 April 2016	European Championships	Førde, Norway	
Total	151 kg	Aleksandra Stepanova	11 April 2016	European Championships	Førde, Norway	
–58 kg
Snatch	56 kg	Gintarė Ašmenskaitė	5 May 2011		Klaipėda, Lithuania	
Clean & Jerk	75 kg	Iveta Dubinskaitė	13 July 2011		Klaipėda, Lithuania	
Total	130 kg	Iveta Dubinskaitė	13 July 2011		Klaipėda, Lithuania	
–63 kg
Snatch	73 kg	Lijana Jakaitė	7 June 2018	Lithuanian Championships	Klaipėda, Lithuania	
Clean & Jerk	92 kg	Lijana Jakaitė	7 June 2018	Lithuanian Championships	Klaipėda, Lithuania	
Total	165 kg	Lijana Jakaitė	7 June 2018	Lithuanian Championships	Klaipėda, Lithuania	
–69 kg
Snatch	80 kg	Lijana Jakaitė	10 June 2017	Lithuanian Championships	Klaipėda, Lithuania	
Clean & Jerk	96 kg	Lijana Jakaitė	10 June 2017	Lithuanian Championships	Klaipėda, Lithuania	
Total	176 kg	Lijana Jakaitė	10 June 2017	Lithuanian Championships	Klaipėda, Lithuania	
–75 kg
Snatch	96 kg	Gintarė Bražaitė	8 October 2015	European U23 Championships	Klaipėda, Lithuania	
Clean & Jerk	114 kg	Gintarė Bražaitė	8 October 2015	European U23 Championships	Klaipėda, Lithuania	
Total	210 kg	Gintarė Bražaitė	8 October 2015	European U23 Championships	Klaipėda, Lithuania	
–90 kg
Snatch	74 kg	Danutė Saudargaitė	9 June 2017	Lithuanian Championships	Klaipėda, Lithuania	
Clean & Jerk	87 kg	Danutė Saudargaitė	9 June 2017	Lithuanian Championships	Klaipėda, Lithuania	
Total	161 kg	Danutė Saudargaitė	9 June 2017	Lithuanian Championships	Klaipėda, Lithuania	
+90 kg
Snatch	79 kg	Indrė Didžklapytė	7 June 2018	Lithuanian Championships	Klaipėda, Lithuania	
Clean & Jerk	97 kg	Indrė Didžklapytė	7 June 2018	Lithuanian Championships	Klaipėda, Lithuania	
Total	176 kg	Indrė Didžklapytė	7 June 2018	Lithuanian Championships	Klaipėda, Lithuania	

== See also ==
- List of Lithuanian records
