= Klimas =

Klimas may stand for:

People

- Petras Klimas (1891–1969), Lithuanian diplomat, author, historian
- Kastytis Klimas (born 1969), Lithuanian track and field sprint athlete
