= Ines Bibernell =

East German runner

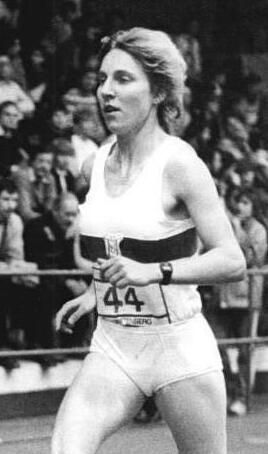
Bibernell at the 1986 East German Indoor Championships

Ines Bibernell (née Obst; born 21 July 1965 in Querfurt, Bezirk Halle) is a former East German female track and field athlete who competed in middle- and long-distance track events. She was a gold medallist at the European Athletics Indoor Championships in 1986.

A member of the SC Chemie Halle athletics club, the Querfurt-born athlete came to prominence in the 1985 season. The teenager won a 1500 metres/3000 metres double at the East German Indoor Championships before going on to take a 3000 m/10,000 metres double at the East German Athletics Championships outdoors. Her first major international appearances came that year in the 10,000 m and she was runner-up at the 1985 European Cup and placed fourth at the 1985 IAAF World Cup.

At the start of 1986, she defended her national indoor title over 3000 m and set an under-23 indoor world best for the 2-mile run, finishing in a time of 9:34.27 minutes in New York City. This remains the German national record for that event. The greatest feat of her career came that February, as she won the gold medal over 3000 m at the 1986 European Athletics Indoor Championships – the only East German woman ever to win that title. After this victory she won a 1500/3000 m double at the national outdoor championships. A third straight East German indoor 3000 m title came in 1987, but this was the last high level achievement of her briefly flourishing career.

== Personal bests ==
- 800 metres: 2:05.4 min, 9 June 1983, Neubrandenburg
- 1500 metres: 4:05.64 min, 28 June 1985, Potsdam
- 2000 metres: 5:47.58 min, 22 September 1985, East Berlin
- 3000 metres: 8:49.80 min, 27 June 1986, Jena
- 5000 metres: 15:27.05 min, 3 July 1986, Dresden
- 10,000 metres: 32:32.28 min, 1 June 1986, Erfurt

== International competitions ==
Year	Competition	Venue	Position	Event	Notes
1985	European Cup	Moscow, Soviet Union	2nd	10,000 m	32:47.42
1985	World Cup	Canberra, Australis	4th	10,000 m	32:45.58
1986	European Indoor Championships	Madrid, Spain	1st	3000 m	8:54.52

== National titles ==
- East German Athletics Championships
  - 1500 m: 1986
  - 3000 m: 1985, 1986
  - 10,000 m: 1985
- East German Indoor Athletics Championships
  - 1500 m: 1985
  - 3000 m: 1985, 1986, 1987

== See also ==
- List of European Athletics Indoor Championships medalists (women)
