= List of Lithuanian records in archery =

This is a listing of the national archery records for Lithuania.

== Men's records ==
Event	Record	Athlete	Date	Location
Recurve
FITA Round (144 arrows)	1313	Arvydas Čepulionis	2010	Järvakandi, Estonia
90 m (36 arrows)	313	Arvydas Čepulionis	2007	Klaipėda, Lithuania
70 m (36 arrows)	332	Lenardas Benortas	2007	Klaipėda, Lithuania
50 m (36 arrows)	331	Arvydas Čepulionis	2010	Riga, Latvia
30 m (36 arrows)	355	Arvydas Čepulionis	2009	Klaipėda, Lithuania
70 m (72 arrows)	660	Arvydas Čepulionis	2009	Kaunas, Lithuania
Team FITA Round (3x133 arrows)	3819	Arvydas Čepulionis; Ignas Morkeliūnas; Stanislavas Surutkovičius	2010	Lviv, Ukraine
Team 70 m Round (3x72 arrows)	1851	Arvydas Čepulionis; Taurūnas Lubys; Vidmantas Vaičekauskis	2012	Utena, Lithuania
Team Final Round (24 arrows)	214	Arvydas Čepulionis; Ignas Morkeliūnas; Stanislavas Surutkovičius	2010	Lviv, Ukraine

== Women's records ==
Event	Record	Athlete	Date	Location
Recurve
FITA Round (144 arrows)	1290	Inga Kizeliauskaitė	2010	Järvakandi, Estonia
70 m (36 arrows)	316	Inga Kizeliauskaitė	2010	Järvakandi, Estonia
60 m (36 arrows)	320	Inga Kizeliauskaitė	2010	Järvakandi, Estonia
50 m (36 arrows)	311	Inga Kizeliauskaitė	2010	Järvakandi, Estonia
30 m (36 arrows)	346	Inga Kizeliauskaitė	2010	Klaipėda, Lithuania
70 m (72 arrows)	635	Inga Kizeliauskaitė	2010	Vilnius, Lithuania
Team FITA Round (3x133 arrows)	3694	Inga Kizeliauskaitė; Gerda Pociūnaitė; Inga Rabikauskaitė	2010	Järvakandi, Estonia
Team 70 m Round (3x72 arrows)	1716	Inga Kizeliauskaitė; Gerda Pociūnaitė; Inga Rabikauskaitė	2010	Šiauliai, Lithuania
Team Final Round (24 arrows)	200	Inga Kizeliauskaitė; Gerda Pociūnaitė; Inga Rabikauskaitė	2011	Šiauliai, Lithuania

== See also ==
- List of Lithuanian records
