= Ever Palma =

Mexican racewalker

Personal information
- Full name: Ever Jair Palma Olivares
- Born: 18 March 1992 (age 34) Zitácuaro, Michoacán, Mexico
- Education: Anahuac University of North Mexico
- Height: 1.66 m (5 ft 5 in)
- Weight: 60 kg (132 lb)

Sport
- Country: Mexico
- Sport: Athletics
- Event: 20km Race Walk

Ever Jair Palma Olivares (born 18 March 1992, in Zitácuaro, Michoacán) is a Mexican racewalker.

He competed for Mexico in 20 kilometres walk at the 2012 Summer Olympics in London and the 2016 Olympics in Rio, and the race walk mixed relay at the 2024 Olympics.

Palma holds the World's best time in Mile walk, achieved in February 2025, with a time of 5:24.50. His older brother, Isaac, is also a racewalker.
