= Irena Oženko =

Lithuanian former long jumper (born 1962)

Irena Oženko (née Dukhnovich; born 13 November 1962) is a Lithuanian former long jumper who competed for the Soviet Union.

Her stand-out performance came in Budapest in 1986 when she jumped 7.20 m (23 ft 7 1/4 in). This ranked her fourth in the world for that year. This remains a Lithuanian record and a best for the Baltic states. It also puts her in the world's top twenty athletes ever for the event, as of 2016.

She was a champion at the Soviet Indoor Athletics Championships in 1987, winning the long jump with 6.88 m (22 ft 6 3/4 in). She also represented the Soviet Union at the 1982 European Athletics Championships, coming twelfth overall.
