= 1986 European Athletics Indoor Championships – Women's 3000 metres =

The women's 3000 metres event at the 1986 European Athletics Indoor Championships was held on 23 February.

== Results ==
| Rank | Name | Nationality | Time | Notes |
|---|---|---|---|---|
| 1st place, gold medalist(s) | Ines Bibernell | East Germany | 8:54.52 | |
| 2nd place, silver medalist(s) | Yvonne Murray | Great Britain | 9:01.31 | |
| 3rd place, bronze medalist(s) | Regina Chistyakova | Soviet Union | 9:01.72 | |
| 4 | Yelena Romanova | Soviet Union | 9:03.85 | |
| 5 | Margareta Keszeg | Romania | 9:09.95 | |
| 6 | Aurora Cunha | Portugal | 9:10.50 | |
| 7 | Eva Jurková | Czechoslovakia | 9:11.42 | |
| 8 | Teresa Recio | Spain | 9:41.98 | |
| | Agnese Possamai | Italy | DNF | |
