= List of Lithuanian records =

The list of Lithuanian records might refer to:

- List of Lithuanian records in archery
- List of Lithuanian records in athletics
- List of Lithuanian records in Olympic weightlifting
- List of Lithuanian records in swimming
- List of Lithuanian records in track cycling

== See also ==
- Category:Albums by Lithuanian artists
