= Lithuanian Indoor Athletics Championships =

Annual track and field competition

- Sport: Indoor track and field
- Founded: 1948, 1990
- Country: Lithuania

The Lithuanian Indoor Athletics Championships (Lithuanian: Lietuvos uždarų patalpų lengvosios atletikos čempionatas) is an annual indoor track and field competition organised by the Lithuanian Athletics Federation, which serves as the national championship for the sport in Lithuania. Recent competitions were held in Klaipėda. The first championships was held in 1948, but as the country was subsumed into the Soviet Union after World War II, the Soviet Athletics Championships served as the national event during this period. After the Act of the Re-Establishment of the State of Lithuania, a national Lithuanian championships was restored and held in 1990.

== Events ==
The following athletics events feature as standard on the Lithuanian Indoor Championships programme:

- Sprint: 60 m, 200 m, 400 m
- Distance track events: 800 m, 1500 m, 3000 m
- Hurdles: 60 m hurdles
- Steeplechase: 1500 m steeplechase, 2000 m steeplechase
- Jumps: long jump, triple jump, high jump, pole vault
- Throws: shot put
- Combined events: heptathlon (men), pentathlon (women)
- Racewalking: 5000 m walk (men), 3000 m walk (women)

Former events that were held at the championships include sprints over 30 m, 35 m, and 50 metres, 10,000 m racewalking, and the 4 × 200 metres relay.

== Championships records ==
=== Men ===
Event	Record	Athlete/Team	Date	Place	Ref.
60 m					

=== Women ===
Event	Record	Athlete/Team	Date	Place	Ref.
60 m					
Pole vault	4.26 m	Rugilė Miklyčiūtė	23 February 2025	Panevėžys	
