= Gintarė Bražaitė =

Lithuanian weightlifter (born 1992)

Personal information
- Born: 19 August 1992 (age 33) Lithuania

Sport
- Sport: Weightlifting
Medal record
Representing Lithuania
European U23 Championships
Silver medal – second place	2015 Klaipėda	–75 kg

Gintarė Bražaitė (born 19 August 1992) is a Lithuanian Olympian weightlifter and coach. She multiple times broke Lithuanian women's national record.

Bražaitė competed at the 2019 World Weightlifting Championships, where she finished in 13th place. Bražaitė finished 5th at the 2021 European Weightlifting Championships
