= Mile walk =

Racewalking distance

Athletics Mile walk

World records
- Men: (Mexico) Ever Jair Palma Olivares 5:24.50 i (2025)
- Women: (Ukraine) Lyudmila Olyanovska 6:10.09 (2026)

The Mile race walk is a rarely contested racewalking event. The event is competed as a track race. Athletes must always keep in contact with the ground and the supporting leg must remain straight until the raised leg passes it.

== World bests ==
World Athletics (former IAAF) doesn't ratify world records in this event. On February 8, 2025, Ever Jair Palma Olivares of Mexico set the Mile walk world best for men in New York City in a time of 5:24.50. On July 1, 2026, Lyudmila Olyanovska of Ukraine set the Mile walk world best in Eisenstadt in a time of 6:10.09 and took more than 6 seconds of the nearly 25-year-old mark from Kjersti Tysse Plätzer of Norway.

== All-time top 25 ==
- i = indoor performance
- h = hand timing

=== Men ===
Rank	Result	Athlete	Nationality	Date	Place	Ref.
1	5:24.50 i	Ever Jair Palma Olivares	Mexico	8 February 2025	New York City	
2	5:31.08	Tom Bosworth	Great Britain	9 July 2017	London	
3	5:32.34 i	Perseus Karlström	Sweden	8 February 2025	New York City	
4	5:33.53 i	Tim Lewis	United States	6 February 1988	New York City	
5	5:34.45 i	Andreas Gustafson	Sweden	15 February 2014	New York City	
6	5:35.49	Maher Ben Hlima	Poland	4 June 2023	Chorzów	
7	5:35.83	Christopher Linke	Germany	8 February 2025	New York City	
8	5:36.27	Diego García	Spain	9 July 2017	London	
9	5:36.9 h	Antanas Grigaliūnas	Lithuania	12 May 1990	Vilnius	
10	5:38.52	Łukasz Niedziałek	Poland	4 June 2023	Chorzów	
11	5:39.75 i	Robert Heffernan	Ireland	15 February 2014	New York City	
12	5:41.83	Dawid Tomala	Poland	5 June 2022	Chorzów	
13	5:44.0 h	Massimo Fizialetti	Italy	16 May 1988	Ostia	
14	5:46.81	Artur Brzozowski	Poland	4 June 2023	Chorzów	
15	5:48.36	Miroslav Úradník	Slovakia	5 June 2022	Chorzów	
16	5:48.42 i	Allen James	United States	4 February 1994	New York City	
17	5:49.6 h	Iñaki Gómez	Canada	9 September 2011	Keighley	
18	5:49.63	Rafał Sikora	Poland	9 July 2017	London	
19	5:50.70	Rhydian Cowley	Australia	14 December 2023	Melbourne	
20	5:51.59 i	Steve Pecinovsky	United States	2 February 1990	New York City	
21	5:51.61 i	Curt Clausen	United States	2 February 1996	New York City	
22	5:51.84 i	Doug Fournier	United States	4 February 1994	New York City	
23	5:52.76	Artur Brzozowski	Poland	5 June 2022	Chorzów	
24	5:52.93 i	Nick Christie	United States	1 February 2026	New York City	
25	5:53.2 h	Evan Dunfee	Canada	9 September 2011	Keighley	

==== Notes ====
Below is a list of other times equal or superior to 5:53.2:

- Perseus Karlström also walked 5:38.18 (2017).
- Tim Lewis also walked hand-timed 5:38.2i (1987), 5:41.12i (1987), 5:50.53i (1990), 5:51.64i (1992).
- Christopher Linke also walked 5:40.04 (2022).
- Diego García also walked 5:44.84i (2025).
- Allen James also walked 5:50.44i (1993), 5:50.46i (1996), 5:52.75i (1995).
- Doug Fournier also walked 5:51.87i (1991).

=== Women ===
Rank	Result	Athlete	Nationality	Date	Place	Ref.
1	6:10.09	Lyudmila Olyanovska	Ukraine	1 July 2026	Eisenstadt	
2	6:16.45	Kjersti Tysse Plätzer	Norway	2 September 2001	Knarvik	
3	6:16.72 i	Sada Eidikytė	Soviet Union	24 February 1990	Kaunas	
4	6:17.29 i	Rachel Seaman	Canada	15 February 2014	New York City	
5	6:18.03 i	Debbi Lawrence	United States	9 February 1992	Fairfax	
6	6:18.07 i	Michelle Rohl	United States	9 February 1992	Fairfax	
7	6:19.00 i	Maria Michta-Coffey	United States	15 February 2014	New York City	
8	6:21.85	Theresia Emma Mohr	Austria	1 July 2026	Eisenstadt	
9	6:23.90	Ema Klimentová	Czech Republic	1 July 2026	Eisenstadt	
10	6:27.76	Olga Chojecka	Poland	4 June 2023	Chorzów	
11	6:28.20	Lauren Harris	United States	1 July 2026	Eisenstadt	
12	6:28.21 i	Taylor Ewert	United States	9 February 2019	New York City	
13	6:28.46 i	Giuliana Salce	Italy	16 February 1985	Genoa	
14	6:28.53 i	Teresa Vaill	United States	9 February 1992	Fairfax	
15	6:29.21 i	Victoria Herazo	United States	15 February 1992	Richfield	
16	6:34.2 h i	Maryanne Torrellas	United States	19 February 1988	Inglewood	
17	6:35.51 i	Sara Standley	United States	7 February 1993	Fairfax	
18	6:35.97	Tiziana Spiller	Hungary	1 July 2026	Eisenstadt	
19	6:36.06 i	Ann Peel	Canada	29 January 1988	Toronto	
20	6:36.32 i	Miranda Melville	United States	11 February 2017	New York City	
21	6:36.69	Katarzyna Zdziebło	Poland	4 June 2023	Chorzów	
22	6:40.2 h i	Lynn Weik	United States	19 February 1988	Inglewood	
23	6:40.76 A	Ileana Salvador	Italy	12 August 1989	Sestriere	
24	6:41.2 h	Johanna Atkinson	Great Britain	9 September 2011	Keighley	
25	6:41.30 i	Robyn Stevens	United States	8 February 2020	New York City	

==== Notes ====
Below is a list of other times equal or superior to 6:41.30:

- Kjersti Tysse Plätzer also walked 6:16.45 (2001) and hand-timed 6:33.1 (2000).
- Sada Eidikytė also walked hand-timed 6:14.7i (1993), 6:19.40 (1990), 6:24.4i (1991).
- Debbi Lawrence also walked 6:20.18i (1993), 6:21.09i (1992).
- Maria Michta-Coffey also walked 6:31.85i (2017), 6:34.47i (2015), 6:40.06i (2013).
- Taylor Ewert also walked 6:34.53i (2019), 6:34.53i (2020).
- Maryanne Torrellas also walked 6:35.18 i (1988), 6:35.69i (1988), hand-timed 6:36.8i (1990), 6:37.06i (1988).
- Lauren Harris also walked 6:39.81i (2020).
- Sara Standley also walked hand-timed 6:38.9i (1990).
- Michelle Rohl also walked 6:39.75 (2001).
- Teresa Vaill also walked hand-timed 6:39.9i (1990).
- Ann Peel also walked 6:37.66i (1988).
- Lynn Weik also walked 6:40.64i (1988).
