= Anatolijus Baranovas =

Soviet long-distance runner

Personal information
- Nationality: Soviet
- Born: 2 February 1940 (age 86) Buregi, Soviet Union

Sport
- Sport: Long-distance running
- Event: Marathon

Anatolijus Baranovas (born 2 February 1940) is a Soviet long-distance runner. He competed in the marathon at the 1972 Summer Olympics.
