= Laimutė Baikauskaitė =

Soviet athletics competitor (born 1956)

Medal record

Women's Athletics

Representing the Soviet Union

Olympic Games
Silver medal – second place	1988 Seoul	1.500 metres

Laimutė Baikauskaitė (born June 10, 1956 in Gaideliai, Klaipėda County) is a retired female middle-distance runner, who represented the USSR and later Lithuania. She competed mainly in the 1500 metres, and won an Olympic silver medal in 1988 with a strong final one hundred meter sprint, though well behind winner Paula Ivan of Romania. In that Olympic final, she set a Lithuanian record (4:00.24).
