= Živilė Balčiūnaitė =

Lithuanian long-distance runner

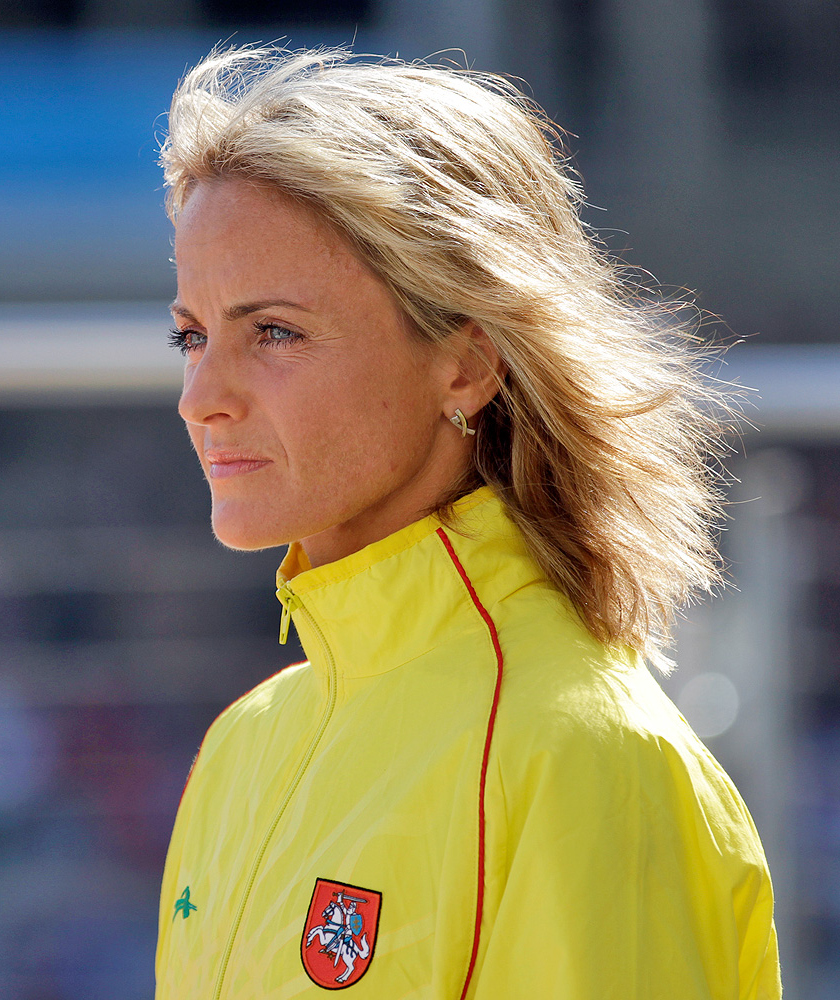

Personal information
- Nationality: Lithuania
- Born: 3 April 1979 (age 46) Vilnius, Lithuanian SSR, Soviet Union

Sport
- Country: Lithuania
- Sport: Running

Achievements and titles
- Regional finals: 1st, 2010
- National finals: 1st, 2000; 2nd, 2001, 2009

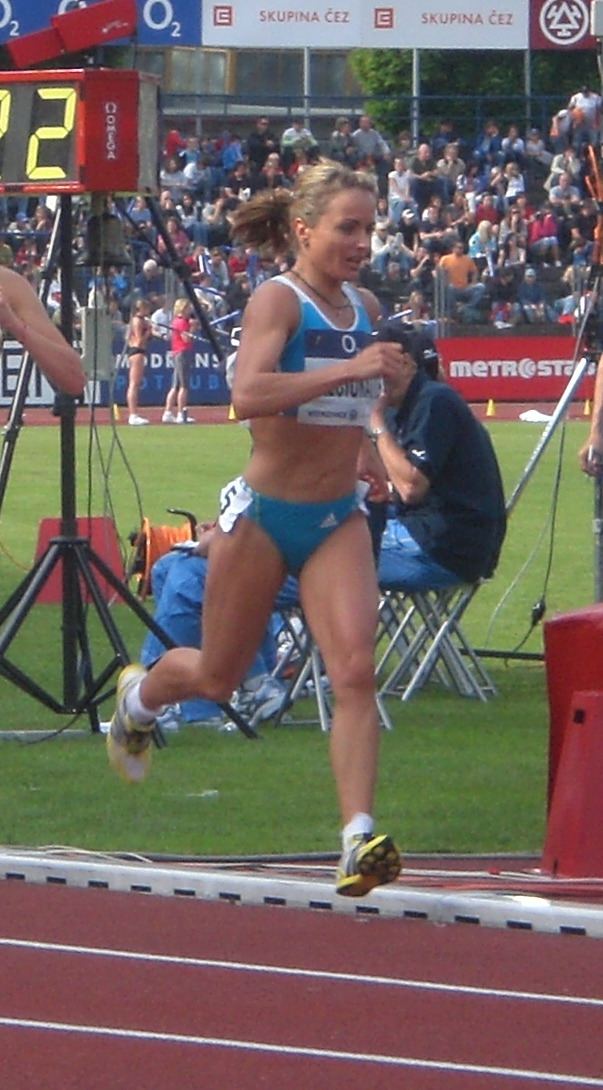
Živilė Balčiūnaitė at the 2010 Golden Spike Ostrava

Živilė Balčiūnaitė (born 3 April 1979 in Vilnius) is a Lithuanian Marathon runner.

== Career ==
Balčiūnaitė finished 4th at the 2006 European Athletics Championships in Gothenburg. She also competed in the same event at the 2004 Olympics, finishing 14th. She finished 11th at the 2008 Olympics.

== Doping bans ==
In April 2011, the Athletics Federation of Lithuania announced Balčiūnaitė has been banned for two years for a positive drug test and was stripped of her marathon gold medal from the 2010 European Athletics Championships.

Balčiūnaitė received an eight year ban in July 2016 by the Athletics Federation of Lithuania after testing positive for meldonium.

== Achievements ==
Year	Competition	Venue	Position	Event	Notes
Representing Lithuania
1998	World Junior Championships	Annecy, France	10th	3000 m	9:34.01
1999	European U23 Championships	Gothenburg, Sweden	5th	10,000 m	33:47.13
2001	European U23 Championships	Amsterdam, Netherlands	5th	10,000 m	34:04.34
2004	2004 Olympic Games	Athens, Greece	14th	Marathon	2:35:01
2006	2006 European Championships in Athletics	Gothenburg, Sweden	4th	Marathon	2:31:01
2007	2007 World Championships in Athletics	Osaka, Japan	33rd	Marathon	2:43:28
2008	2008 Olympic Games	Beijing, China	11th	Marathon	2:29:33
2009	2009 World Championships in Athletics	Berlin, Germany	19th	Marathon	2:31:06
2010	2010 European Championships in Athletics	Barcelona, Spain	dq	Marathon	2:31:14
2013	2013 World Championships in Athletics	Moscow, Russia	20th	Marathon	2:41:09 SB
