= Simas Bertašius =

Lithuanian middle-distance runner (born 1993)

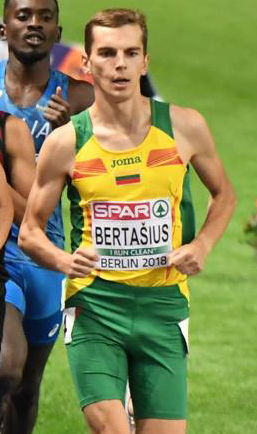
- Simas Bertašius in 2018

Personal information
- Born: 31 October 1993 (age 32) Raseiniai, Lithuania
- Height: 1.83 m (6 ft 0 in)

Sport
- Sport: Athletics
- Event: 1500 metres
- Club: COSMA Vilnius
- Coached by: J. Garalevičius; E. Petrokas

Simas Bertašius (born 31 October 1993 in Raseiniai) is a Lithuanian middle-distance runner competing primarily in the 1500 metres. His best result is the sixth place at the 2018 European Championships in Berlin.

== International competitions ==
Year	Competition	Venue	Position	Event	Notes
Representing Lithuania
2017	Universiade	Taipei, Taiwan	7th	1500 m	3:46.05
2017	Universiade	Taipei, Taiwan	16th (h)	5000 m	14:39.41
2018	European Championships	Berlin, Germany	6th	1500 m	3:39.04
2019	European Indoor Championships	Glasgow, United Kingdom	20th (h)	1500 m	3:49.90
2021	European Indoor Championships	Toruń, Poland	25th (h)	1500 m	3:42.17
2022	World Indoor Championships	Belgrade, Serbia	26th (h)	1500 m	3:48.48
2022	European Championships	Munich, Germany	15th (h)	1500 m	3:40.19
2025	European Running Championships	Leuven, Belgium	53rd	10 km	29:56
2026	European Championships	Birmingham, United Kingdom	17th	5000 m	13:36.22

== Personal bests ==
Outdoor

- 800 metres – 1:48.48 (Valmiera 2021)
- 1000 metres – 2:21.11 (Pärnu 2018)
- 1500 metres – 3:37.19 NR
- Mile run – 3:59.25 (Vilnius 2020) NR
- 3000 metres – 7:42.07 (Votford, 2025) NR
- 5000 metres – 13:27.00 (Boston 2026)

Indoor

- 800 metres – 1:51.69 (Kaunas 2020)
- 1000 metres – 2:24.49 (Vilnius 2018)
- 1500 metres – 3:38.32 (Ostrava 2022) NR
- 3000 metres – 8:12.26 (Klaipeda 2018)
