= Stefanija Statkuvienė =

Lithuanian long-distance runner (born 1962)

Stefanija Statkuvienė (born September 5, 1962) is a retired long-distance runner from Lithuania. She competed in the women's marathon event at the 1996 Summer Olympics in Atlanta, finishing in 40th place (2:39.51). Statkuvienė set her personal best in the women's classic distance in 1995, clocking 2:28.11.

Statkuvienė was born in Kuršėnai.

== Achievements ==
- All results regarding marathon, unless stated otherwise

Year	Competition	Venue	Position	Notes
Representing Lithuania
1996	Olympic Games	Atlanta, United States	40th	2:39:51

== See also ==
- Lithuanian records in athletics
