= Valdas Kazlauskas =

Lithuanian racewalker (born 1958)

Valdas Kazlauskas (born 23 February 1958 in Vilnius, Lithuanian Soviet Socialist Republic) is a retired male racewalker and athletics coach from Lithuania. He competed for his native Baltic country at the 1996 Summer Olympics in Atlanta, Georgia, finishing in 44th place (1:28.33) in the men's 20 km race walk event. Kazlauskas set his personal best (1:19.29) in the same distance on 19 February 1989 in Sochi. Valdas Kazlauskas achieved the World and European Record for the 20 km Race Walking with the performance of 1:20:37 on the 16 September 1983 in Moscow. Valdas Kazlasukas reached 27 national records, 1 European record and 3 world records.

== Achievements ==
| Year | Competition | Venue | Position | Event | Notes |
Representing the Soviet Union
| 1983 | Soviet Athletics Championships | Moscow, Russia | 1st | 20 km | 1:20:37 |
| 1987 | World Race Walking Cup | New York City, United States | 9th | 20 km | 1:21:49 |
Representing Lithuania
| 1994 | European Championships | Helsinki, Finland | 19th | 20 km | 1:27:02 |
| 1995 | World Championships | Gothenburg, Sweden | 32nd | 20 km | 1:33:54 |
| 1996 | Olympic Games | Atlanta, United States | 44th | 20 km | 1:28:33 |
