= Kastytis Klimas =

Lithuanian sprinter (born 1969)

Personal information
- Born: 26 April 1969 (age 57) Domeikava, Soviet Union

Sport
- Sport: Track and field

Kastytis Klimas (born 26 April 1969) is track and field sprint athlete who competed internationally for Lithuania.

== National championships ==
- 3 gold medals in 100 m running: 1989, 1992, 1993
- 3 gold medals in 200 m running: 1988, 1991, 1992
- 1 gold medal in 4 × 100 m relay: 1991

== Personal bests ==
=== Hand timing ===
- 60 m - 6,4 (NR)
- 100 m - 9,9 (NR)
- 200 m - 20,8 (NR)
- 300 m - 33,9 (NR)

=== Electronic timing ===
- 60 m - 6,62 (NR)
- 100 m - 10,33 (former NR)
- 200 m - 21,13
- 200 m - 21,27 (NR, indoors)
