= Lithuanian Athletics Federation =

Lithuanian sports governing body

- Lietuvos lengvosios atletikos federacija
- Sport: Athletics
- Abbreviation: LLAF
- Founded: 1921
- Affiliation: World Athletics
- Regional affiliation: EAA
- Headquarters: Vilnius, Lithuania
- President: Eimantas Skrabulis
- Secretary: Nijolė Medvedeva

Official website
- lengvoji.lt
- (Lithuania)

Lithuanian Athletics Federation (Lithuanian: Lietuvos lengvosios atletikos federacija) is the national sporting organisation recognised by the Lithuanian sports commission for athletics activity in Lithuania. Founded at 1921. Federation president is former 100 m and 200 m national champion Eimantas Skrabulis. Federation organizing Lithuanian Athletics Championships and approving national records.

== History ==
The origins of the Lithuanian Athletics Federation date back to 1921, when the first Lithuanian Athletics Championships were held in Kaunas (13 events, men only). At that time athletics was governed by the Physical Education Association of Lithuania, chaired by Stepas Garbačiauskas.

In 1922 the Sports League of Lithuania was founded, and its Athletics Committee was responsible for the sport from 1923 to 1932. From 1932 to 1940 athletics was administered by the Athletics Association. After the Soviet occupation of Lithuania in 1940, Kaunas hosted the first Baltic States Athletics Competition.

The Lithuanian Athletics Federation was officially established in 1959. Before that, athletics was managed by the Athletics Section of the Lithuanian SSR (1941, 1945–1959).

In 1990 the athletics federations of Lithuania, Latvia and Estonia agreed to organize a joint Baltic Championships and the first edition took place in Vilnius. On 25 October, 1991 the Lithuanian Athletics Federation was reinstated as a member of the International Amateur Athletic Federation (IAAF).

=== Name changes ===
- 1921–1922 – Part of Physical Education Association of Lithuania (Lithuanian: Lietuvos fizinio lavinimosi sąjunga)
- 1923–1932 – Sports League Athletics Committee of Lithuania (Lithuanian: Lietuvos sporto lygos lengvosios atletikos komitetas)
- 1932–1940 – Athletics Association (Lithuanian: Lengvosios atletikos sąjunga)
- 1941, 1945–1959 – LSSR Athletics Section (Lithuanian: LTSR Lengvosios atletikos sekcija)
- since 1959 – Lithuanian Athletics Federation (Lithuanian: Lietuvos lengvosios atletikos federacija)
