= Dalia Matusevičienė =

Lithuanian middle-distance runner

Dalia Matusevičienė (born 7 January 1962) is a former middle-distance runner who competed mainly in the 800 metres. She represented the Soviet Union at the 1988 Seoul Olympics, and later represented Lithuania. She is the 1989 Soviet champion in the 800 metres.

== Career ==
Matuseviciené represented the Soviet Union at the 1988 Olympics. She ran 2:02.57 in the heats to qualify for the semifinals, where she was eliminated running 2:00.15. She won the Soviet 800m title in 1989 in 1:58.52. Also that year, she finished third at the European Cup behind Doina Melinte and Sigrun Wodars, before going on to finish fourth at the World Cup behind Ana Quirot, Wodars and Melinte.

In 1993, Matuseviciené competed for Lithuania at the World Indoor Championships. She ran 2:04.05 in the heats to qualify for the semifinals as a fastest loser. In the semifinals she ran 2:02.17 for fifth in the faster of the two semis, to miss out on the final by one place.

== International competitions ==
| Year | Competition | Venue | Position | Event | Notes |
Representing Soviet Union
| 1988 | Olympic Games | Seoul, South Korea | 11th (sf) | 800 m | 2:00.15 |
| 1989 | European Cup | Gateshead, United Kingdom | 3rd | 800 m | 1:59.74 |
| 1989 | World Cup | Barcelona, Spain | 4th | 800 m | 1:57.27 |
Representing Lithuania
| 1993 | World Indoor Championships | Toronto, Canada | 5th (sf) | 800 m | 2:02.17 |
(sf) Indicates overall position in semifinal round
