= Mindaugas Pukštas =

Lithuanian marathon runner (born 1978)

Personal information
- Nickname: Mindi
- Nationality: Lithuania
- Born: 3 August 1978 (age 47) Kaunas, Lithuanian SSR, Soviet Union
- Height: 1.80 m (5 ft 11 in)
- Weight: 70 kg (154 lb)

Sport
- Sport: Athletics
- Event: Marathon
- College team: Oklahoma State Cowboys
- Coached by: Rene Sepulveda

Achievements and titles
- Personal best: Marathon: 2:12:52

Mindaugas Pukštas (born 3 August 1978) is a Lithuanian former marathon runner. He represented his nation Lithuania at the 2004 Summer Olympics, and later became an All-American in cross-country racing as a member of the track and field team for Oklahoma State University, under head coach Rene Sepulveda, while studying at Oklahoma State University in Stillwater, Oklahoma, United States. Before his time at Oklahoma State, Pukštas was an All-American for the SMU Mustangs track and field team, finishing 8th in the 5000 m at the 2003 NCAA Division I Indoor Track and Field Championships.

Before he retired from his athletic career in 2006 to pursue volunteer coaching for his alma mater's track and field squad, Pukstas ran a career best in 2:12:52 to win his first and only title at the Eurasia Marathon in Istanbul.

Pukstas qualified for the men's marathon at the 2004 Summer Olympics in Athens, by finishing third and registering an A-standard entry time of 2:14.59 from the Motorola Marathon in Austin, Texas. He finished seventy-fourth in a vast field of a hundred runners with a time of 2:33:02, trailing behind the gold medalist Stefano Baldini of Italy by nearly twenty-two minutes.

Pukstas currently resides in Stillwater, Oklahoma, along with his wife and fellow assistant coach Živilė Pukštienė, and their children Rokas and Gabija. In May 2011, Pukštas overcame the rains across the city's lengthy course to claim the Oklahoma City Memorial Marathon title under the men's senior category in 2:31:33.
