= Nijolė Medvedeva =

Lithuanian long jumper (born 1960)

Personal information
- Born: Nijolė Bluškytė; 21 October 1960 (age 65) Kelmė, Lithuania
- Height: 1.75 m (5 ft 9 in)
- Weight: 61 kg (134 lb)

Sport
- Sport: Long jump
Medal record
Representing the Soviet Union
World Championships
| Bronze medal – third place | 1985 Paris | Long jump |

Nijolė Medvedeva (née Bluškytė; 21 October 1960 or 20 June 1960.) is a retired Lithuanian long jumper who won a bronze medal at the 1985 World Indoor Championships. She competed at the 1992 Summer Olympics, and made 4th, but was disqualified for a doping-rule violation. Medvedeva has her personal best at 7.14 m (1988). She also competed in sprint running events at the national level.

In 1987 Medvedeva graduated from the Lithuanian University of Educational Sciences and then until 1989 worked as an instructor at the Dynamo sportclub. Since 1990s she worked in business.
