= Sada Eidikytė =

Lithuanian racewalker (born 1967)

Sada Eidikytė-Bukšnienė (born 9 September 1967) is a Lithuanian race walker. In 1989 she set the world record in the 3000 meter track walk along with the European record in 3 km walk and 5 km walk. In 1990 she set the world record in the one mile walk.

She was the fifteen time Lithuanian national champion in racewalking between 1986 and 1993. Eidikytė also won a bronze medal at Soviet Union championships.

== Personal bests ==
Event	Time (sec)	Date
Mile walk	6:16.72 (WR)	1990
3 km walk	12:27.0 (WR)	1989
3000 m walk	12:09.91	1990
5 km walk	20:53.0	1989

== See also ==
- List of world records in athletics
