= 2023 in Lithuania =

- Decades: 2000s; 2010s; 2020s
- See also: Other events of 2023

== Incumbents ==
- President: Gitanas Nausėda
- Prime Minister: Ingrida Šimonytė

== Events ==
Ongoing: 2021–2023 Belarus–European Union border crisis, COVID-19 pandemic in Lithuania

- January 18 – Lithuanian government renounced the agreement signed with Belarus on the principles of cross-border cooperation. The bill terminated the agreement signed by the governments of Lithuania and Belarus in Vilnius on June 1, 2006, to set out areas of cross-border cooperation between the two neighbouring countries, as a response to 2021–2023 Belarus–European Union border crisis.
- March 31 – Embassy of India opened in Vilnius, instating first direct diplomatic mission of India in Lithuania.
- April 20 – Lithuanian parliament Seimas finalised and approved sanctions to all Russian and Belarusian citizens as a response to Russian invasion of Ukraine. From 1 May 2023, citizens of both countries are illegible to obtain Lithuanian visas, e-resident status or exchange Ukrainian hryvnia. In addition, Russian citizens are also illegible to submit request for permanent stay in Lithuania or purchase property within Lithuanian territory.
- April 22 – Lithuania concluded a trial in operating outside of IPS/UPS BRELL circle in preparation to disconnect from Russian led synchronous transmission grid and joining Synchronous grid of Continental Europe no later than February 2025.
- June 11 – start of 2023 Vilnius NATO summit.
- June 27 – Vilnius become a first European city that implemented driverless delivery robots on public roads.

== Disasters and accidents ==
- January 13: 2023 Lithuania–Latvia pipeline explosion: an explosion in Lithuania–Latvia Interconnection pipeline system by Pasvalio Vienkiemiai village, Pasvalys District Municipality. As a precaution the entire village of Valakėliai was evacuated.
- January 31: bridge partially collapsed in Kėdainiai downtown over Nevėžis river. Bridge connected the city with main intercity roads.
- February 14: a bridge construction that is part of A1 highway in Kaunas collapsed. No casualties reported.
- May 13: LY-BCD type sailplane crashed to the ground near Naukaimis II village. Pilot of the plane died during the crash.
- May 26: autogyro crashed to the ground in the territory of Bistrampolis Manor in Kučiai village, Panevėžys District Municipality. Pilot of the plane died during the crash.

== National anniversaries ==
Lithuanian parliament Seimas released the statement confirming the celebratory of following three national anniversaries in 2023:

- 700 years anniversary of establishment of Vilnius
- 100 years anniversary of reunification with Klaipėda
- 400 years anniversary of Josaphat Kuntsevych's sacrifice.

== Transport ==
- January 2 – Lithuanian Railways stopped 3 direct train services Šiauliai–Panevėžys, Radviliškis–Mažeikiai and Radviliškis–Šiauliai. All 3 routes were replaced by Panevėžys–Šiauliai–Mažeikiai route, coursing 8 times a day and combining Radviliškis–Daugavpils Railway and Libau–Romny Railway infrastructure.
- February 16 – Lithuania stopped any cargo trade with Belarus via railway border point Stasylos-Bieniakoni, leaving only one railway cargo link between two countries in Kena-Hudahaj railway link point.
- February 20 – LTG Cargo (part of Lithuanian Railways group) decreased transit numbers of goods moving between Russia's mainland and Kaliningrad Oblast through Lithuania by 7%, limiting Russia to 2.89 tonnes of goods in 2023.
- February 26 – Lithuanian customs reinstated third party cargo check points at the Lithuania–Poland border, due increased cargo freight from non-EU countries via Poland and Lithuania to Belarus.
- August 18 – due ongoing political tension and Wagner Group placement in Belarus, Lithuania closed two out of six road border crossings with Belarus near Tverečius and Šumskas.
- December 27 – after 16 years the direct train link renewed between Vilnius and Riga.

== Environment ==
- January 1 – new record set for warmest new year day in Lithuanian history with temperature rising to 14.9 C in Druskininkai municipality.
- January 5 – Minija river broke through flood wall and flooded Stragnai II village.
- January 14 – a sinkhole formed that was 17.2m in diameter in Užubaliai, Biržai District Municipality. It was the biggest sinkhole to appear in Lithuania within the last two decades.
- January 22 – oil spill from discontinued railway factory polluted Nemunas river in Kaunas. Pollution stopped the following day.
- January 30 – Nevėžis river flooded Justinava village.
- March 4 – due strong winds record breaking 717 MW of wind electricity generated in Lithuania at the same time, setting a new record.
- June 11 – Bradeliškės hillfort located in Vilnius District Municipality, enlisted to national register as protected area with national significance.
- July 1 – oil spill near Ariogala and Butkiškė village resulted in extreme environmental alert issued in the Raseiniai District Municipality and pollution of Dubysa river.
- July 1 – ban of free plastic bags come in action with supermarkets having to charge for use of plastic bags.
- July 18 – strong storm breaks the oldest tree in city of Vilnius - over 300 years old tilia in Sapieha Palace, Vilnius.
- August 17 – new heath record set in Birštonas, where weather reached 34.6 C degrees, the new highest temperature for 17 August ever recorded in Lithuania.
- September 1 – Oil spillage in Danė and Neris rivers in Klaipėda polluted 3 km of internal waters in Lithuania.
- November 8 – rising Akmena river flooded town of Kretinga.

== Law and crime ==
- January 1 – new restriction come into action preventing minors under 18 years old to participate in any form of lottery. Minors caught buying a lottery ticket would be issued with the fine up to 440 euros, while service provider selling lottery tickets to minors could be issued with up to 3,000 euros fine.
- January 1 – changes in maternity and paternity time-off law came into action. The time off law was changed from 12 to 24 months to 18–24 months, the government pay-outs changed to direct pays of 100.54% based on parent's direct salary, single parents gained increased pay-outs.
- January 31 – three homemade bombs was detected in Vilnius Levas Karsavinas school. All students and teachers evacuated, while special forces inspected the bombs.
- April 28 – an active wartime 81mm landmine discovered in Rumpiškėnai, Rokiškis District Municipality. Explosive was detonated and destroyed by special forces.
- July 1 – increase in national benefit payments for childcare, sick pay and unemployment benefits.
- September 15 – Lithuania's president Gitanas Nausėda signed a decree stripping Margarita Drobiazko of her Lithuanian citizenship due to her "public support for the Russian Federation during the 2022 Russian invasion of Ukraine".
- September 21 - Lithuanian parliament Seimas adopted a law banning fur farming by 2027.
- December 2 – an active wartime 76mm mine discovered in Meiliūnai, Vilkaviškis District Municipality. Explosive was detonated and destroyed by special forces.
- December 29 – regional courts of Skuodas, Akmenė, Lazdijai, Pakruojis and Pasvalys closed and functions move to neighboring districts.

=== Administrative changes ===
- January 1 – Žaliūkės village transferred from Šiauliai District Municipality to Šiauliai City municipality.

== Politics ==
- January 13: Freedom Award by Seimas awarded to Ukrainian president Volodymyr Zelenskyy, presentation held in National Parliament.
- January 23: Kristijonas Bartoševičius withdrew his membership in the national parliament Seimas. On February 1, the official investigation started for allegations of paedophilia against Bartoševičius.
- February 7: National Freedom Scholarship awarded to philosopher Vilius Bartninkas.
- March 2: Political party of Russian Alliance in Lithuania was disestablished due rules violation after party failed to present list of party members three rounds in a row. In addition 3 other parties was disestablished by submitting official request: Party of Political Prisoners, Nations Solidarity Union, Order and Justice.
- March 5: 2023 Lithuanian municipal elections took place in Lithuania with Social Democratic Party of Lithuania and Homeland Union winning the most seats in local municipalities.
- March 30: Mykolas Majauskas submitted a request to stop his membership in a national parliament Seimas.

== Military ==
- May 12: new naval military squad established and dislocated at Nida.

== Sports ==
- February 5–12 : 2023 Vitas Gerulaitis Cup
- February 15: Lazdynai Swimming Pool officially opened in Vilnius, Lithuania. Upon completion it is the biggest swimming sports arena in Lithuania and the Baltic states.
- March 19–25: 2023 FAI F3P World Championships
- May 19–21: 2023 EuroLeague Final Four
- June 1–9: 2023 Modern Pentathlon Youth European Championships
- August 4 – 12: 2023 European U17 Badminton Championships
- 27 August – 3 September: 2023 470 Junior World Championships
- 12–17 September: 2023 World Junior Modern Pentathlon Championships

== Deaths ==
- January 16 – Vladas Česiūnas, 82, sprint canoeist, Olympic champion (1972).
- January 18 – Marius Zibolis, 48, goalball player, Paralympic silver medallist (2000, 2008).
- January 20 – Grigorijus Kanovičius, 93, writer
- February 15 – Algimantas Žižiūnas, 83, photographer.
- May 21 – Alma Adamkienė, 96, philologist and philanthropist, wife of the president of Lithuania, Valdas Adamkus, and served as First Lady during his two terms (1998–2003 and 2004–2009).
