= 2010 in Lithuania =

- Decades: 1990s; 2000s; 2010s; 2020s
- See also: Other events of 2010

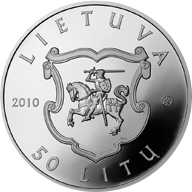
50 litas coin, minted 2010

This article is about the particular significance of the year 2010 to Lithuania and its people.

== Incumbents ==
- President: Dalia Grybauskaitė
- Prime Minister: Andrius Kubilius

== Chairmanships ==
- Community of Democracies

== Events ==
- May 28 – was held Sidabrinė gervė 2010.
- August 8 – wind flaw killed 4 people.
- August 27 – Gritė Maruškevičiūtė won Miss Lithuania 2010 title.
- October 7 – Lithuania and European Space Agency written cooperation agreement.

== Sports ==
- July 1–3 – Alytus held 2010 Lithuania Swimming Championships
- July 9–10 – in S. Darius and S. Girėnas Stadium was held 2010 Lithuanian Athletics Championships.
- July 22-August 1 – Lithuania held and won U18 European Championship Men 2010 Division A.
- July 27-August 1 – Živilė Balčiūnaitė won gold medal for Lithuania at marathon event in 2010 European Athletics Championships.
- August 14–26 – Lithuania achieved 19th place in 2010 Summer Youth Olympics with 5 medal (3 golden and 2 bronze)
- September 9–19 – Nida held 2010 Lithuanian Sailing Championships.
- September 12 – Lithuanian national basketball team won bronze medal at 2010 FIBA World Championship.
- November 25 – Vytautas Janušaitis won silver medal in 2010 European Short Course Swimming Championships.
- November – Vilnius held Lithuania Open darts championship.
- Lithuanian Sportsman of the Year 2010: Simona Krupeckaitė

== Deaths ==
- January 20 - Abraham Sutzkever, Yiddish poet.
- January 25 – Algirdas Petrulis, painter.
- January 26 - Eugenijus Karpavičius, illustrator.
- April 8 - Stanislovas Gediminas Ilgūnas, politician. In 1990 he was among those who signed the Act of the Re-Establishment of the State of Lithuania.
- June 26 - Algirdas Brazauskas, the first president of a newly independent post-Soviet Union Lithuania from 1993 to 1998 and prime minister from 2001 to 2006.
- July 7 - Vytautas Čekanauskas, architect, professor of the Vilnius Academy of Art.
