= 2026 in Lithuania =

- Decades: 2000s; 2010s; 2020s
- See also: Other events of 2026

Events in the year 2026 in Lithuania.

== Incumbents ==
- President: Gitanas Nausėda
- Prime Minister: Inga Ruginienė (until 14 June); Mindaugas Sinkevičius (since 14 July)

== Events ==
=== January ===
- 18 January–8 February – UEFA Futsal Euro 2026 in Latvia, Lithuania and Slovenia.

=== March ===
- 2 March – Lithuanian National Radio and Television says it will not air the opening ceremony of the upcoming 2026 Winter Paralympics, citing the participation of athletes from Russia and Belarus.
- 6 March – Lithuania boycotts the opening ceremony of the 2026 Winter Paralympics in Italy in protest over Russian athletes being allowed to compete under the Russian flag after the lifting of sanctions imposed over the Russian invasion of Ukraine in 2022.

=== April ===
- 27 April – Authorities announce the arrest of nine people involved in an international plot to assassinate two-anti Russian activists based in Lithuania.

=== May ===
- 16 May – Lithuania's Lion Ceccah finishes 22nd at Eurovision 2026 in Austria with their single "Sólo quiero más".
- 25 May – Adrijus Jusas resigns as head of the State Enterprise Centre of Registers following a data leak involving more than 600,000 entries from national data registers blamed on a foreign state.

=== June ===
- 23 June – Inga Ruginienė resigns as prime minister along with her cabinet after the LSDP ends its coalition agreement with Dawn of Nemunas.

=== July ===
- 14 July – Mindaugas Sinkevičius is sworn in as prime minister after the LSDP reaches a coalition agreement with the Union of Democrats "For Lithuania" and the Lithuanian Farmers, Greens and Christian Families Union.

=== September ===
- 15 September – A drone that originated from Belarusian airspace is shot down by NATO fighter jets near Kaunas.

== Art and entertainment ==
- List of Lithuanian submissions for the Academy Award for Best International Feature Film

== Holidays ==
- 1 January – New Year's Day
- 16 February – Independence Day
- 11 March – Independence Restoration Day
- 5 April – Easter Sunday
- 6 April – Easter Monday
- 1 May – International Workers' Day
- 3 May – Mother's Day
- 7 June – Father's Day
- 24 June – St. John's Day
- 6 July – Statehood Day
- 15 August – Assumption Day
- 1 November – All Saints' Day
- 24 December – Christmas Eve
- 25 December – Christmas Day
- 26 December – 2nd Day of Christmas

== Deaths ==
- 12 January – Benjaminas Zelkevičius, 81, football player (Žalgiris Vilnius, Shakhtar Donetsk) and manager (national team)
- 20 March – Linas Banys, 27, biathlete
- 28 May – Jevgenij Shuklin, 40, Olympic canoeist (2012) and MP (since 2024)
- 10 June – Vladas Garastas, 94, basketball coach (Žalgiris, Soviet Union national team, national team)
- 3 July – Viliumas Malinauskas, 81, art museum founder (Grūtas Park)
- 30 July – Kazimira Prunskienė, 83, prime minister (1990–1991), MP (1996–2008), and minister of agriculture (2004–2008)
- 31 August – Artūras Fomenka, 49, footballer (Ekranas, Kareda Šiauliai, national team)
- 12 September – Povilas Varanauskas, 85, politician, signatory of the Act of the Re-Establishment

== See also ==
- 2026 in the European Union
- 2026 in Europe
