= 2016 in Lithuania =

- Decades: 1990s; 2000s; 2010s; 2020s
- See also: Other events of 2016

== Incumbents ==
- President: Dalia Grybauskaitė
- Prime Minister: Algirdas Butkevičius (until 14 November) Saulius Skvernelis (from 14 November)
- Seimas Speaker: Loreta Graužinienė (until 14 November) Viktoras Pranckietis (from 14 November)

== Events ==
- Cauliflower Revolution

=== August ===
- August 5–21 - 49 athletes from Lithuania competed at the 2016 Summer Olympics in Rio de Janeiro, Brazil

== Deaths ==
- 21 December: mixed martial artist and kickboxer Remigijus Morkevičius (born 1982)
