= 2027 in Lithuania =

- Decades: 2000s; 2010s; 2020s
- See also: Other events of 2027

Events in the year 2027 in Lithuania.

== Events ==
=== Predicted and scheduled events ===
- March - 2027 Municipal elections
- 16–27 June – EuroBasket Women 2027 in Belgium, Finland, Lithuania and Sweden

== Holidays ==
- 1 January – New Year's Day
- 16 February – Independence Day
- 11 March – Independence Restoration Day
- 28 March – Easter Sunday
- 29 March – Easter Monday
- 1 May – International Workers' Day
- 2 May – Mother's Day
- 6 June – Father's Day
- 24 June – St. John's Day
- 6 July – Statehood Day
- 15 August – Assumption Day
- 1 November – All Saints' Day
- 24 December – Christmas Eve
- 25 December – Christmas Day
- 26 December – 2nd Day of Christmas

== See also ==
- 2027 in the European Union
- 2027 in Europe
