= Donatas Paužuolis =

Lithuanian aeromodeller

Medal record

Aeromodelling

Representing Lithuania

World Championships
Gold medal – first place	2019 Heraklion	F3P AM
Gold medal – first place	2023 Jonava	F3P AM
Silver medal – second place	2013 Coburg	F3P
Silver medal – second place	2019 Heraklion	F3P
Silver medal – second place	2023 Jonava	F3P

World Air Games
Gold medal – first place	2009 Turin	F6A Artistic
Gold medal – first place	2015 Dubai	F3P AM
Bronze medal – third place	2009 Turin	F6A Music

Donatas Paužuolis (born 12 September 1984 in Vilnius) is a Lithuanian aeromodeller, multiple medallist at World Championships.

At the 2015 World Air Games Paužuolis won the gold medal in the aeromodelling F3P indoor aerobatics event. Paužuolis won one gold and one silver medal at the 2023 FAI F3P World Championships.
