= 2017 in Lithuania =

- Decades: 1990s; 2000s; 2010s; 2020s
- See also: Other events of 2017

Events in the year 2017 in Lithuania.

== Incumbents ==
- President: Dalia Grybauskaitė
- Prime Minister: Saulius Skvernelis
- Seimas Speaker: Viktoras Pranckietis

== Deaths ==
- 17 March – Laurynas Stankevičius, economist and politician, former Prime Minister (b. 1935)
- 6 June – Rokas Žilinskas, journalist and politician, member of the Lithuanian Parliament (b. 1972)
