= Miss Lithuania 2010 =

- Date: August 27, 2010
- Presenters: Livija Gradauskienė and Jogaila Morkūnas
- Venue: Belmontas, Vilnius, Lithuania
- Broadcaster: Lietuvos ryto TV
- Entrants: 14
- Placements: 3
- Winner: Gritė Maruškevičiūtė; Vilnius

The 19th Miss Lithuania 2010 pageant was held on August 27, 2010. This year only 20 candidates are competing for the national crown. The chosen winner represented Lithuania at the Miss World 2010. Contest started with 40 participants and at the final there left only 14 contestants.

== Final results ==
Final results	Candidates
Miss Lithuania 2010	Vilnius - Gritė Maruškevičiūtė
1st Runner-up	Vilnius - Deimantė Bubelytė
2nd Runner-up	Klaipėda - Ieva Jotkelaitė

=== Special awards ===
- Miss Public - Gritė Maruškevičiūtė (Vilnius)
- Miss Elegance - Sandra Lukšytė (Vilnius)
- Miss Photo - Elona Račkutė (Kaunas)

== Jury ==
- Benas Gudelis, organizer and „KristiAna“ delegate
- Dalia Michelevičiūtė, actress
- Kęstutis Rimdžius, stylist and TV presenter
- Vaida Kursevičienė, Missis Lithuania 2010
- Raimundas Adžgauskas, photographer

== Candidates ==
Contestant	Age	City
Deimantė Bubelytė	20	Vilnius
Ieva Jotkelaitė	21	Klaipėda
Laura Kuliešaitė	22	Vilnius
Beata Liminovič	22	Vilnius
Agnė Lukaitytė	18	Palanga
Sandra Lukšytė	21	Vilnius
Raminta Mačytė	19	Marijampolė
Gritė Maruškevičiūtė	21	Vilnius
Greta Peleckytė		
Monika Plataunaitė	23	Klaipėda
Elona Račkutė	18	Kaunas
Viktorija Starych	18	Vilnius
Ieva Viltrakytė	22	Vilnius
Vera Zavadskaja	23	Vilnius
