= Meiliūnai =

Village in Marijampolė County, Lithuania

- Village
- Location within Lithuania
- Coordinates: 54°30′43.2″N 22°42′57.6″E
- Country: Lithuania
- County: Marijampolė County
- Municipality: Vilkaviškis District Municipality
- Eldership: Vištytis Eldership

Population (2021)
  - Total: 23
- Time zone: UTC+2 (EET)
  - Summer (DST): UTC+3 (EEST)

Meiliūnai is a village in Marijampolė County, south west Lithuania, 1 km from boarder with Russia. According to the 2021 census, the village had a population of 23 inhabitants.

== History ==
On 2 December 2023, an active wartime 76mm explosive discovered in Meiliūnai, Vilkaviškis District Municipality. The explosive was detonated and destroyed by special forces.

== Demography ==
Historical population

Year	Pop.	±% p.a.
1959	103	—
1970	108	+0.43%
1979	51	−8.00%
1989	53	+0.39%

Year	Pop.	±% p.a.
2001	47	−1.00%
2011	27	−5.39%
2021	23	−1.59%

Source: 1902, 1923, 1959 & 1970, 1979, 1989, 2001, 20112021
