= Užubaliai =

- Village
- Location within Lithuania
- Coordinates: 56°13′15.6″N 24°38′24″E
- Country: Lithuania
- County: Panevėžys County
- Municipality: Biržai District Municipality
- Eldership: Pabiržė Eldership

Population (2021)
  - Total: 50
- Time zone: UTC+2 (EET)
  - Summer (DST): UTC+3 (EEST)

Užubaliai is a village in Panevėžys County, in northern Lithuania. According to the 2021 census, the village had a population of 50 inhabitants.

== History ==
On 14 January 2023, a sinkhole formed in the village. Measuring at 17.2 metres (56 ft) in diameter, it was the largest sinkhole to appear in Lithuania in the last two decades.

== Demography ==
Historical population

Year	Pop.	±% p.a.
1902	242	—
1923	249	+0.14%
1959	155	−1.31%
1970	112	−2.91%
1979	107	−0.51%

Year	Pop.	±% p.a.
1989	47	−7.90%
2001	49	+0.35%
2011	44	−1.07%
2021	50	+1.29%

Source: 1902, 1923, 1959 & 1970, 1979, 1989, 2001, 20112021
