= 2019 in Lithuania =

- Decades: 1990s; 2000s; 2010s; 2020s
- See also: Other events of 2019

Events of 2019 in Lithuania.

== Incumbents ==
- President: Dalia Grybauskaitė (until 12 July), Gitanas Nausėda (starting 12 July)
- Prime Minister: Saulius Skvernelis
- Seimas Speaker: Viktoras Pranckietis

== Events ==
27 March: The Vilnius Regional Court finds the Soviet Union's last defense minister, 94-year-old Dmitry Yazov, guilty of war crimes for his role in a violent crackdown on Lithuania's independence move on 13 January 1991.

== Links ==
- Media related to 2019 in Lithuania at Wikimedia Commons
