= Gabrielė Martirosian =

Lithuanian beauty pageant contestant (born 1991)

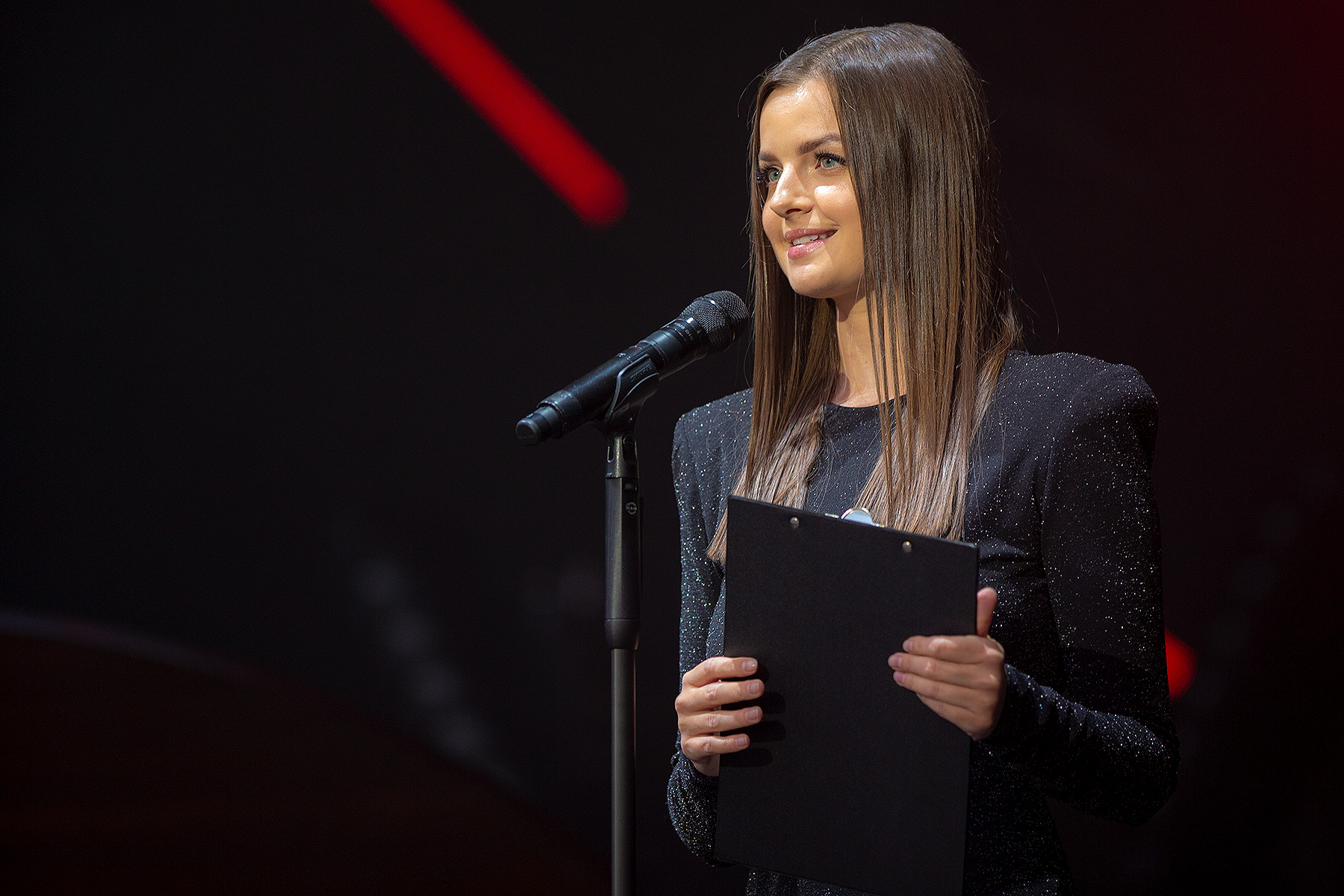
- Martirosian in 2020
- Born: Gabrielė Martirosianaitė; 23 February 1991 (age 35); Kaunas, Lithuania
- Education: Vilnius University (2009–2013)
- Occupations: Model, beauty pageant contestant, actor, radio and television presenter
- Years active: 2007–present
- Employer: LRT
- Known for: Miss Lithuania 2008
- Height: 1.76 m (5 ft 9 1/2 in)

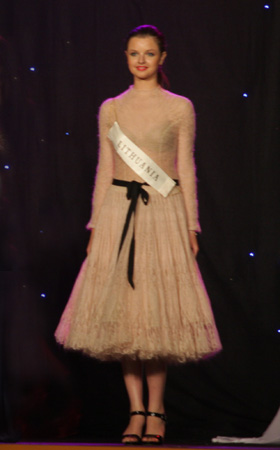
Martirosian at Miss World 2008

Gabrielė Martirosian (born Martirosianaitė; 23 February 1991 in Kaunas) is a Lithuanian model, actress and radio and television presenter. She is best known as Miss Lithuania 2008.

== Career ==
Martirosian started her career as a model with the Modilinos agency in 2007, with her first two contracts involving working in Tokyo and Bangkok.

In 2008, she was selected as Miss Lithuania, subsequently representing Lithuania in that year's Miss World in Johannesburg. However, she did not progress beyond the first round.

She was selected as an ambassador for Vilnius' European Capital of Culture celebrations in 2009.

After graduating from Ugnės Karvelis Gymnasium in Akademija in 2009, she studied Lithuanian philology at Vilnius University, graduating in 2013.

She founded the clothing label Oh! Skin in 2015 and the nail art salon Nail Game in 2017.

=== TV and radio ===
Between 2009 and 2010, Martirosian played the role of Monika in the TV series Moterų alėja.

After graduating from Vilnius University, she worked as a presenter on M-1 between 2013 and 2015.

Since 2019, Martirosian has been a presenter on LRT Radijas. She has become known to an international audience for hosting the Lithuanian national selection for the Eurovision Song Contest, alongside Ieva Stasiulevičiūtė in 2017, Giedrius Masalskis in 2019, Masalskis and Ieva Zasimauskaitė in 2020, and Nombeko Augustė Khotseng in 2024.

=== Film ===
Martirosian made her big-screen movie début in 2020, starring as Kotryna in Vestuvės: importinis jaunikis.

== Personal life ==
Martirosian grew up in Akademija, but spent her summer holidays with her grandparents in Mosėdis and Šilutė.

Her grandfather, Akiles Martirosianas, was born Akilles Martirosyan in Yerevan, but had the suffix -as added to his surname when he emigrated to Lithuania. Martirosian confirmed in July 2019 that she and her family had changed their surname to the original version to reflect their Armenian ancestry.

== See also ==
- Gabrielė Martirosian at IMDb
