= Kučiai =

Village in Panevėžys County, northeastern Lithuania

- Village
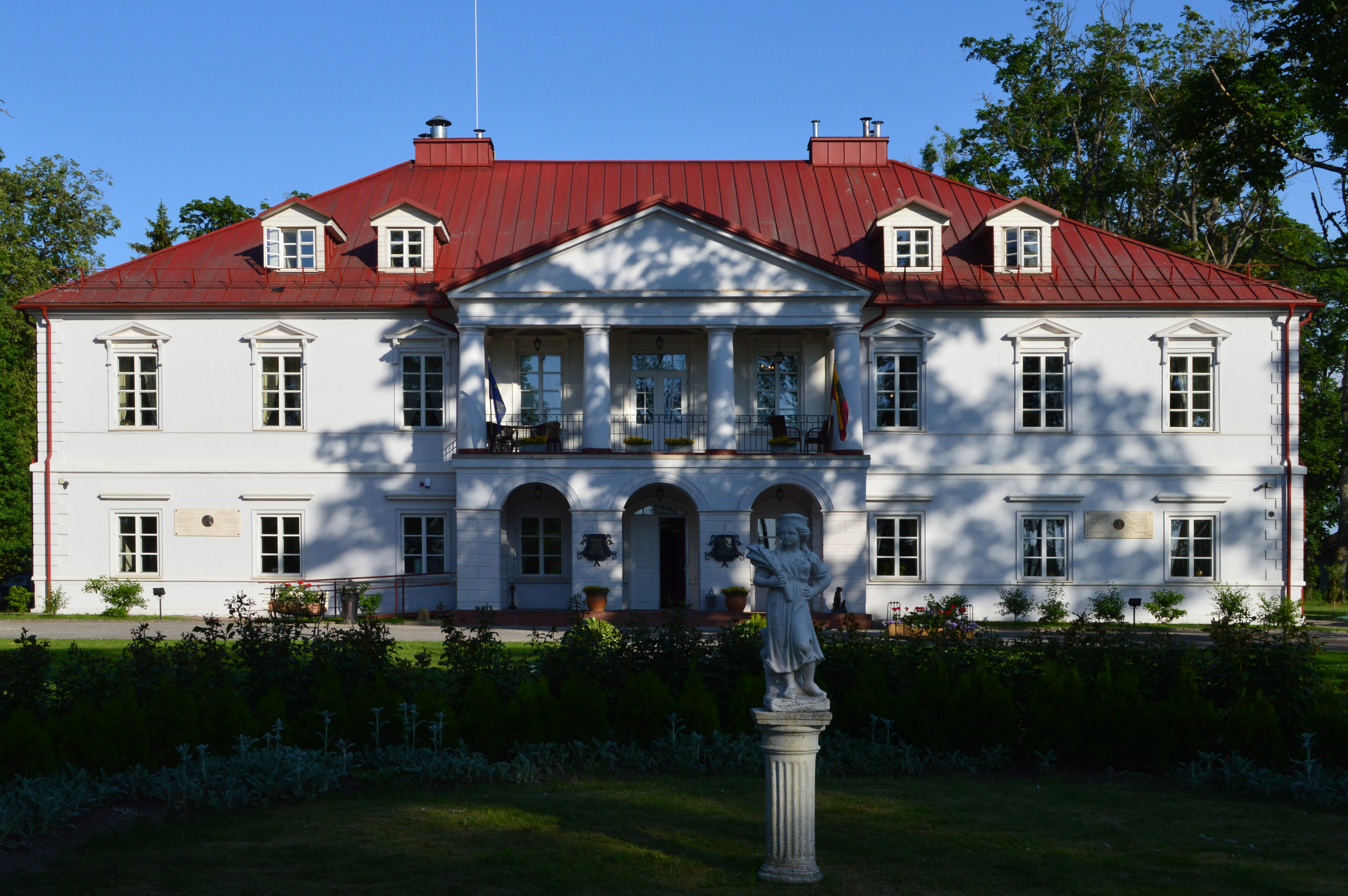

- Location within Lithuania
- Coordinates: 55°36′18″N 24°22′22.8″E
- Country: Lithuania
- County: Panevėžys County
- Municipality: Panevėžys District Municipality
- Eldership: Ramygala Eldership

Population (2021)
  - Total: 15
- Time zone: UTC+2 (EET)
  - Summer (DST): UTC+3 (EEST)

Kučiai is a village in Panevėžys County, in northeastern Lithuania. According to the 2021 census, the village had a population of 15 inhabitants.

== History ==
In 1986 the historic nearby village of Bistrampolis and the territory of Bistrampolis Manor were incorporated into Kučiai.

== Demography ==
Historical population

Year	Pop.	±% p.a.
1902	153	—
1959	110	−0.58%
1970	142	+2.35%
1979	113	−2.51%

Year	Pop.	±% p.a.
1989	41	−9.64%
2001	21	−5.42%
2011	15	−3.31%
2021	15	+0.00%

Source: 1902, 1923, 1959 & 1970, 1979, 1989, 2001, 20112021
