= 2014 in Lithuania =

- Decades: 1990s; 2000s; 2010s; 2020s
- See also: Other events of 2014

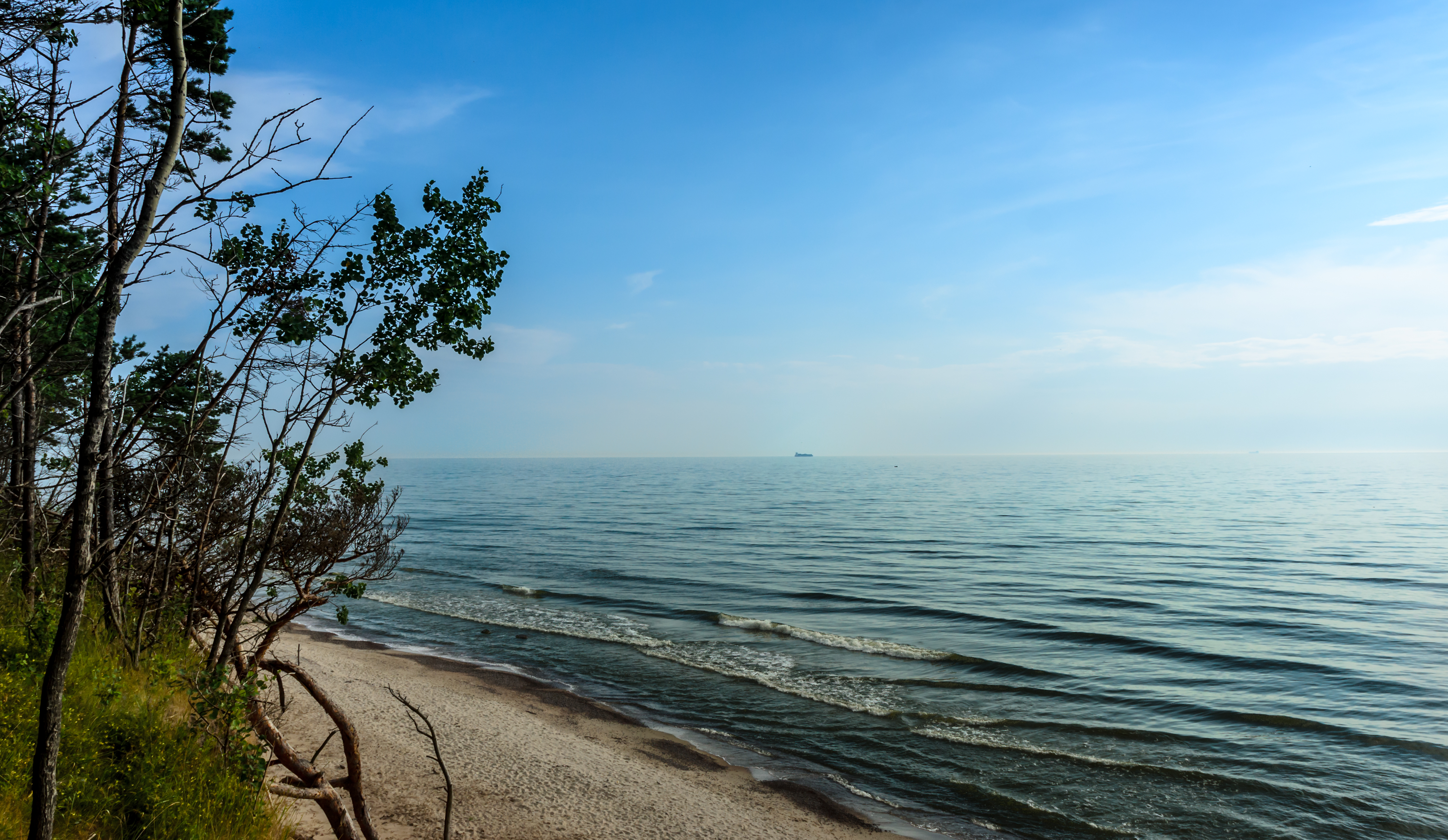
Coast of Baltic Sea near Karklė

Events in the year 2014 in Lithuania.

== Incumbents ==
- President: Dalia Grybauskaitė
- Prime Minister: Algirdas Butkevičius

== Events ==
=== May ===
- 25 May - Lithuania's incumbent President Dalia Grybauskaitė declares victory following a second round of voting in the Baltic country's presidential elections.

=== November ===
- 10 November - An employee at the Lithuanian state air navigation company was charged with espionage. He was suspected of spying on civilian and military air operations on behalf of Belarus.

== Deaths ==
- 20 January - Jonas Trinkūnas, Lithuanian ethnologist and academic (born 1939)
- 9 February - Antanas Račas, politician (born 1940)
