= 2009 in Lithuania =

- Decades: 1980s; 1990s; 2000s; 2010s; 2020s
- See also: Other events of 2009

Events in the year 2009 in Lithuania.

== Events ==
=== May ===
- May - Lithuania in the Eurovision Song Contest 2009
- 17 May - Dalia Grybauskaitė is elected as President of Lithuania in the 2009 Lithuanian presidential election.

=== June ===
- 7 June - 2009 European Parliament election in Lithuania.

=== October ===
- 5 October - Kaunas shooting

== Sports ==
- 2009 European Athletics U23 Championships
- 2009 IIHF World Championship Division I
- Lithuania at the 2009 World Aquatics Championships
- 2009 Lithuanian Athletics Championships
- 2009 European Wrestling Championships
- Lithuania at the 2009 World Championships in Athletics
- 2009 A Lyga
- 2009–10 Baltic League
- 2008–09 Lithuanian Football Cup
- 2009–10 Lithuanian Football Cup
- 2010 FIFA World Cup qualification – UEFA Group 7
