= 2025 in Lithuania =

- Decades: 2000s; 2010s; 2020s
- See also: Other events of 2025

Events in the year 2025 in Lithuania.

== Incumbents ==
- President: Gitanas Nausėda
- Prime Minister: Gintautas Paluckas (until 4 August); Rimantas Šadžius (acting, until 25 September), Inga Ruginienė (since 25 September)

== Events ==
=== February ===
- 8–9 February – Lithuania, along with Estonia and Latvia disconnect from the Russian electric grid and joins the Synchronous grid of Continental Europe.

=== March ===
- 16 March – Jonava District Municipality mayoral by-election
- 25 March – An armored vehicle falls into a swamp at Pabradė Training Area, killing four American soldiers participating in a training exercise.

=== May ===
- 8 May – The Seimas votes 107–0 to withdraw Lithuania from the Ottawa Treaty on Landmines.
- 17 May – Lithuania's Katarsis finishes in 16th place at Eurovision 2025 in Switzerland with the single "Tavo akys".
- 19 May – Lithuania files a case at the International Court of Justice against Belarus accusing it of organising the trafficking of migrants into its territory.

=== June ===
- 30 June – Lithuania and the Philippines sign a defense cooperation agreement.

=== July ===
- 6 July – Poland imposes temporary border controls on crossings with Germany in Lithuania as part of efforts to curb the flow irregular asylum-seekers.
- 10 July – A Russian-made Gerbera drone enters Lithuanian airspace from Belarus and crashes near the Šumskas border checkpoint, about one kilometer from the border with Belarus.
- 28 July – A suspected Russian-made drone enters Lithuanian airspace from Belarus. It is discovered on 1 August at the Gaižiūnai training grounds.
- 31 July – Gintautas Paluckas resigns as prime minister amid an investigation into his business and financial activities.

=== August ===
- 4 August – President Nauseda appoints finance minister Rimantas Šadžius as acting prime minister.
- 13 August – China imposes sanctions on the Lithuanian banks UAB Urbo Bankas and Mano Bankas AB in response to sanctions imposed by the European Union on Chinese financial institutions accused of supporting the Russian invasion of Ukraine.
- 26 August – Inga Ruginienė of the LSDP is elected as prime minister following a 78–35 vote in the Seimas.

=== September ===
- 10 September – Several cars of a freight train carrying liquefied petroleum gas catch fire and explode near Vilnius, injuring one person.
- 11 September – The Belarusian government sends 52 released political prisoners to Lithuania.
- 16 September – Fifteen people are charged with terrorism offences over a series of parcel bombings across Europe in 2024 that were linked to deliveries from Vilnius and blamed on Russia.

=== October ===
- 3 October – Culture minister Ignotas Adomavičius resigns following criticism over his stance on Ukraine.
- 4 October – Around 25 balloons carrying smuggled cigarettes are seen flying near Vilnius Airport, resulting in major disruptions to aviation.
- 20 October – The Via Baltica connecting Poland and the Baltic States is inaugurated in a ceremony led by President Nausėda and Polish president Karol Nawrocki at the Lithuania–Poland border.
- 22 October – Dovilė Šakalienė resigns as defense minister following a dispute with Prime Minister Ruginienė over military spending.
- 23 October – Two Russian military aircraft fly 700 m (2,300 ft) over Lithuanian airspace from Kaliningrad Oblast before turning back after 18 seconds.
- 29 October - Ukraine hands over a Russian soldier accused of war crimes in Ukraine, including on a Lithuanian citizen, to Lithuanian authorities.

=== November ===
- 13 November – The government bans exiled Russian rapper Morgenshtern from entering Lithuania for 10 years, citing national security concerns.
- 24 November – A Ukrainian national is convicted and sentenced to three years' imprisonment for carrying out an arson attack on an IKEA store in Vilnius in 2024 on behalf of Russia.

=== December ===
- 4 December – A court in Vilnius convicts Dawn of Nemunas leader Remigijus Žemaitaitis of making antisemitic remarks in 2023 and sentences him to pay a fine of 5,000 euros ($5,800).
- 9 December – The government declares a state of national emergency due to repeated incursions of balloons carrying contraband from Belarus.
- 16 December – Police arrest 21 people allegedly connected to a criminal network responsible for smuggling cigarettes into the country using weather balloons from Belarus.

== Art and entertainment ==
- List of Lithuanian submissions for the Academy Award for Best International Feature Film
- Lithuania in the Eurovision Song Contest 2025
- List of 2025 box office number-one films in Lithuania

== Holidays ==
- 1 January – New Year's Day
- 16 February – Independence Day
- 11 March – Independence Restoration Day
- 20 April – Easter Sunday
- 21 April – Easter Monday
- 1 May – International Workers' Day
- 4 May – Mother's Day
- 1 June – Father's Day
- 24 June – St. John's Day
- 6 July – Statehood Day
- 15 August – Assumption Day
- 1 November – All Saints' Day
- 24 December – Christmas Eve
- 25 December – Christmas Day
- 26 December – 2nd Day of Christmas

== See also ==
- 2025 in the European Union
- 2025 in Europe
