= 2018 in Lithuania =

- Decades: 1990s; 2000s; 2010s; 2020s
- See also: Other events of 2018

== Incumbents ==
- President: Dalia Grybauskaitė
- Prime Minister: Saulius Skvernelis
- Seimas Speaker: Viktoras Pranckietis

== Events ==
- February: Centennial of the Restored State of Lithuania

== Deaths ==
- 27 July – Algimantas Nasvytis, architect and politician (born 1928)
