= 2020 in Lithuania =

- Decades: 2000s; 2010s; 2020s
- See also: Other events of 2020

== Incumbents ==
- President: Gitanas Nausėda
- Prime Minister: Saulius Skvernelis (until 11 December), Ingrida Šimonytė (starting 11 December)

== Ongoing ==
- COVID-19 pandemic in Lithuania

== Events ==
- 28 February – The first case of COVID-19 in the country was reported.
- 16 March – The government declared a quarantine.
- 18 March – 1st domestic case.
- 19 March – The first case of community spread was reported.
- 20 March – The first COVID-19 death in the country was confirmed.

== Predicted and Scheduled Events ==
- 11 October – 1st round of 2020 Lithuanian parliamentary election.
- 25 October – 2nd round of 2020 Lithuanian parliamentary election.
