= Antanas Račas =

Lithuanian politician

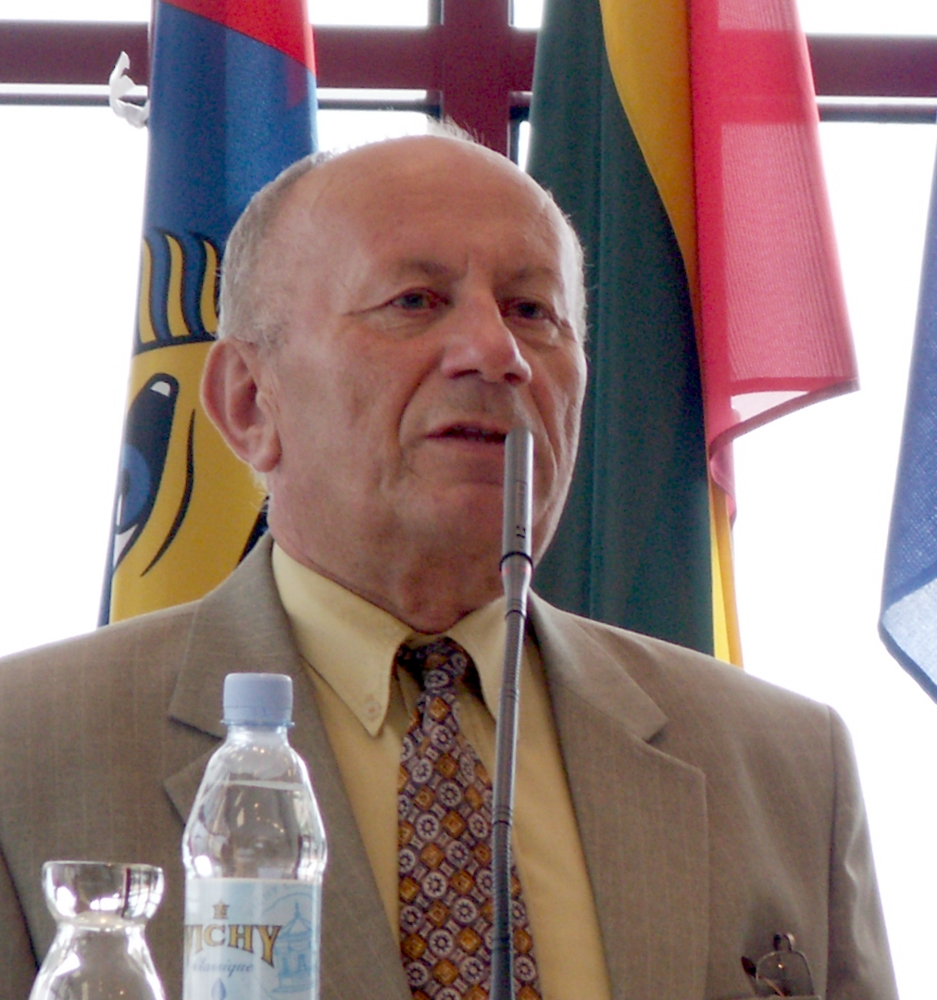

Supreme Council – Reconstituent Seimas
- In office 1990–1992

Personal details
- Born: August 28, 1940 Jurbarkas, Lithuania.
- Died: February 9, 2014 (aged 73) Vilnius, Lithuania
- Education: Vilnius University (BA)

Antanas Račas (August 28, 1940 – February 9, 2014) was a Lithuanian politician. In 1990, he was among those who signed the Act of the Re-Establishment of the State of Lithuania.

== Early life and education ==
Račas was born on August 28, 1940, in Jurbarkas, Lithuania.

Račas graduated from Kiduliai primary school of Šakiai district. In 1962–1967, studied Germanic languages in Vilnius University where he received a degree in philology.

== Career ==
He later worked in various schools. In 1976, he was fired from Šaukėnai Vladas Pūtvis-Putvinskis Gymnasium for "relations with anti-Soviets and clerics".

Until 1990, Račas worked in Kelmė Kražantė Progymnasium as a teacher of the German language. Participated in the activity of Sąjūdis (Reform Movement of Lithuania), was Chairman of the Sajudis Council in Kelme District. After the events of January 1991, the Committee of Foreign Affairs established Lithuanian Information Bureau in Huttenfeld, Germany, Račas was head of the bureau until 18 November 1991. Račas was also the founder of Lithuanian Samaritan Community.

In 1990–1992, Račas was elected to the Supreme Council – Reconstituent Seimas. As a member of the then Homeland Union was a Member of the Seimas since 25 November 1996.

Račas died on February 9, 2014, in Vilnius, Lithuania. His body is buried in the Kelmė Cemetery.
