= 2023 Modern Pentathlon Youth European Championships =

- Location: Druskininkai, Lithuania
- Dates: 1–9 June

The 2023 Modern Pentathlon Youth European Championships was held from 1 to 9 June 2023 in Druskininkai, Lithuania.

== Schedule ==
| Q | Qualification rounds | F | Finals & Awarding |

| Event | June | | | | | | |
| | 2 | 3 | 4 | 5 | 6 | 7 | 8 |
|---|---|---|---|---|---|---|---|
| Men's U17 Individual | | | Q | | F | | |
| Men's U19 Individual | | | | Q | | F | |
| Women's U17 Individual | | | | Q | | F | |
| Women's U19 Individual | | | Q | | F | | |
| Men's U17 Relay | F | | | | | | |
| Men's U19 Relay | | F | | | | | |
| Women's U17 Relay | | F | | | | | |
| Women's U19 Relay | F | | | | | | |
| Mixed U17 Relay | | | | | | | F |
| Mixed U19 Relay | | | | | | | F |
| Total finals | 2 | 2 | 0 | 0 | 2 | 2 | 2 |

== Medal table ==
* Host nation (Lithuania)

| Rank | Nation | Gold | Silver | Bronze | Total |
|---|---|---|---|---|---|
| 1 | Hungary | 5 | 3 | 2 | 10 |
| 2 | Poland | 3 | 2 | 2 | 7 |
| 3 | France | 2 | 3 | 2 | 7 |
| 4 | Ukraine | 2 | 1 | 1 | 4 |
| 5 | Italy | 1 | 0 | 3 | 4 |
| 6 | Lithuania* | 1 | 0 | 2 | 3 |
| 7 | Germany | 0 | 5 | 0 | 5 |
| 8 | Bulgaria | 0 | 0 | 1 | 1 |
| 8 | Turkey | 0 | 0 | 1 | 1 |
| Totals (9 entries) | | 14 | 14 | 14 | 42 |

== Medal summary ==
=== Men's U17 ===
| Event | Gold | | Silver | | Bronze | |
|---|---|---|---|---|---|---|
| Individual | Mathis Issaka Idelarge (FRA) | 1214 | Oleksandr Klymenko (UKR) | 1208 | Oleksandr Melnyk (UKR) | 1195 |
| Team | Ukraine; Oleksandr Klymenko; Oleksandr Melnyk; Oleksandr Chernyshev | 3590 | Hungary; Almos Kiss-Szollosi; Marcell Hugo Gyurka; Levente Laszlo Hornok | 3527 | Poland; Franciszek Dubrawski; Krystian Trepczyk; Maksymilian Dobodz | 3526 |
| Relay | Ukraine; Oleksandr Klymenko; Oleksandr Melnyk | 1394 | Poland; Bartosz Szmytke; Krystian Trepczyk | 1349 | Lithuania; Liutauras Valeika; Džiugas Klevas | 1349 |

=== Women's U17 ===
| Event | Gold | | Silver | | Bronze | |
|---|---|---|---|---|---|---|
| Individual | Emma Herbak (HUN) | 1110 | Linda Haraszin (HUN) | 1107 | Anna Chiara Allara (ITA) | 1102 |
| Team | Hungary; Emma Herbak; Linda Haraszin; Diana Rajncsak | 3294 | Germany; Nadja Farmand; Amaya El-Masri; Hannah Dicks | 3197 | Poland; Hanna Jakubowska; Maja Szondelmajer; Zofia Wyczolek | 3125 |
| Relay | Poland; Hanna Jakubowska; Olga Cisek | 1250 | Germany; Nadja Farmand; Amaya El-Masri | 1242 | Lithuania; Emilija Ulinauskaitė; Emilija Nedzveckaitė | 1155 |

=== Mixed U17 ===
| Event | Gold | | Silver | | Bronze | |
|---|---|---|---|---|---|---|
| Relay | Hungary; Linda Haraszin; Marcell Hugo Gyurka | 1337 | Poland; Hanna Jakubowska; Bartosz Szymtke | 1333 | Turkey; Eda Ozrodop; Ataberk Kaymakoglu | 1333 |

=== Men's U19 ===
| Event | Gold | | Silver | | Bronze | |
|---|---|---|---|---|---|---|
| Individual | Karl Furderer (FRA) | 1512 | Botand Tamas (HUN) | 1502 | Matteo Bovenzi (ITA) | 1502 |
| Team | Italy; Matteo Bovenzi; Denis Agavriloaie; Mattia Bouvet | 4420 | France; Karl Furderer; Dupuy Leriche Nathan; Florent Schoen | 4383 | Hungary; Botond Tamas; Attila Marschall; Zalan Jasso | 4346 |
| Relay | Lithuania; Lukas Gaudiešius; Nojus Chmieliauskas | 1362 | France; Karl Furderer; Dupuy Leriche Nathan | 1360 | Italy; Matteo Bovenzi; Denis Agavriloaie | 1327 |

=== Women's U19 ===
| Event | Gold | | Silver | | Bronze | |
|---|---|---|---|---|---|---|
| Individual | Katarzyna Debska (POL) | 1393 | Josefine Unterberger (GER) | 1380 | Zora Zeman (HUN) | 1367 |
| Team | Hungary; Zora Zeman; Emma Meszaros; Orsolya Dorotty Varga | 4019 | Germany; Sarah Dicks; Josefine Unterberger; Emma Frasdorf | 4016 | France; Coline Flavin; Mathilde Derval; Agathe Chastagner | 4005 |
| Relay | Poland; Katarzyna Debska; Malgorzata Karbownik | 1687 | Germany; Sarah Dicks; Josefine Unterberger | 1655 | France; Coline Flavin; Mathilde Derval | 1645 |

=== Mixed U19 ===
| Event | Gold | | Silver | | Bronze | |
|---|---|---|---|---|---|---|
| Relay | Hungary; Zora Zeman; Botond Tamas | 1316 | France; Mathilde Derval; Karl Furderer | 1310 | Bulgaria; Ralitsa Miteva; Emil Grozdanov | 1308 |
