= Ramygala Eldership =

Eldership of Lithuania

The Ramygala Eldership (Lithuanian: Ramygalos seniūnija) is an eldership of Lithuania, located in the Panevėžys District Municipality. In 2021 its population was 2871.
