= Stanislovas Gediminas Ilgūnas =

Lithuanian politician

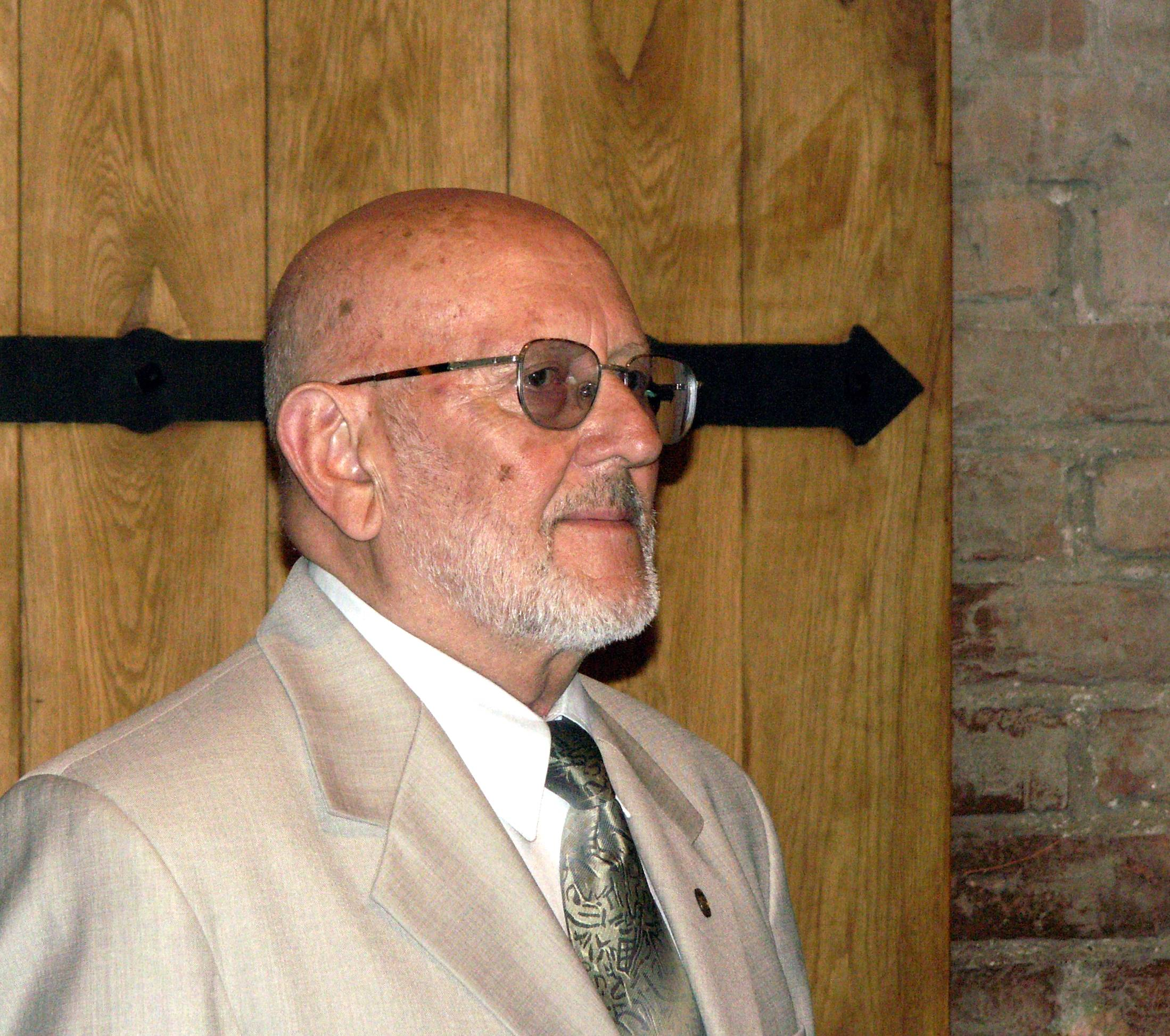

Stanislovas Gediminas Ilgūnas (March 29, 1936 – April 8, 2010) was a Lithuanian politician. In 1990, he was among those who signed the Act of the Re-Establishment of the State of Lithuania. He was a part of the Social Democratic Party of Lithuania.
