= 2011 in Lithuania =

- Decades: 1990s; 2000s; 2010s; 2020s
- See also: Other events of 2011

This article is about the particular significance of the year 2011 to Lithuania and its people.

== Incumbents ==
- President: Dalia Grybauskaitė
- Prime Minister: Andrius Kubilius

== Chairmanships ==
- Organization for Security and Co-operation in Europe

== Events ==
=== January ===
- January 1 – Lithuania received chairmanship of Organization for Security and Co-operation in Europe
- January 1 – Strong snowstorm results in approximately 34,000 people being left without electricity.
- January 1 – Lithuania received chairmanship of NATO embassy in Georgia to represent alliance in country and help it to join to the NATO.
- January 21 – Prime Minister Andrius Kubilius called a special meeting because of too big heating prices in Capital City of Vilnius.
- January 25 – 4 elderships in Pagėgiai municipality announced extreme situation because of floods.

=== February ===
- February 7 – Nemunas River flood started in Jonava district municipality and Kaunas district municipality.
- February 8 – strong wind killed 3 people, 46,000 people being left without electricity and closed Port of Klaipėda
- February 26–27 – national elections to cities councils.

=== March ===
- March 8 – resignation of Minister of Economy Dainius Kreivys.
- March 23 – Lithuanian government approves of personal bankruptcy legislation.

=== April ===
- April 28 – Lithuania's Omnitel opened LTE "4G" network working in 5 biggest cities.

=== June ===
- June 28 – Seimas approved the law under which Lithuanian-Belarusian border inhabitants can easily cross the border.

=== July ===
- July 6 – Ieva Gervinskaitė won Miss Lithuania 2011.
- July 8 – Agrowill Group become second Lithuanian company which selling shares on the Warsaw Stock Exchange.
- July 10 – Lithuania won FIBA Under-19 World Championship.

== Art and entertainment ==
- May
  - May 27 Sidabrinė gervė 2011
  - Lithuania in the Eurovision Song Contest 2011

== Sports ==
=== Multi-sport events ===
- SELL Student Games in Kaunas.

=== Athletics (track and field) ===
- 4 March – Austra Skujytė won silver medal in 2011 European Athletics Indoor Championships. It is the first independent Lithuania medal in championship.
- Local events
  - February 18–19 – National Indoor championship in Klaipėda.
  - May 25 – Lithuania Open 100 km running championship in Nida.
  - July 23–24 – 2011 Lithuanian Athletics Championships in Kaunas.
  - September 11 – Vilnius Marathon.
  - September 24 – National Half Marathon Championship in Nida.

=== Basketball ===
- September 3–18 – Lithuania will host EuroBasket 2011.

=== Boxing ===
- 2011 Lithuanian Boxing Championships

=== Darts ===
- October 14 - Vilnius will host Lithuania Open darts championship.

=== Football ===
- 2010–11 Baltic League.
- 2010–11 Lithuanian Football Cup.

=== Sambo ===
- Vilnius wil host the 2011 World Sambo Championships.

=== Snowboarding ===
- 29 January first time started Lithuanian Snowboarding Championships

=== Swimming ===
- 28–30 June 2011 Lithuania Swimming Championships in Alytus

=== Volleyball ===
- 11–14 August Capital City of Vilnius wil host U18 European Beach Volleyball Championships for men and women near the White Bridge.

== Deaths ==
- Justinas Marcinkevičius (born 1930) a prominent Lithuanian poet and playwright.
