= Stragnai II =

- Village
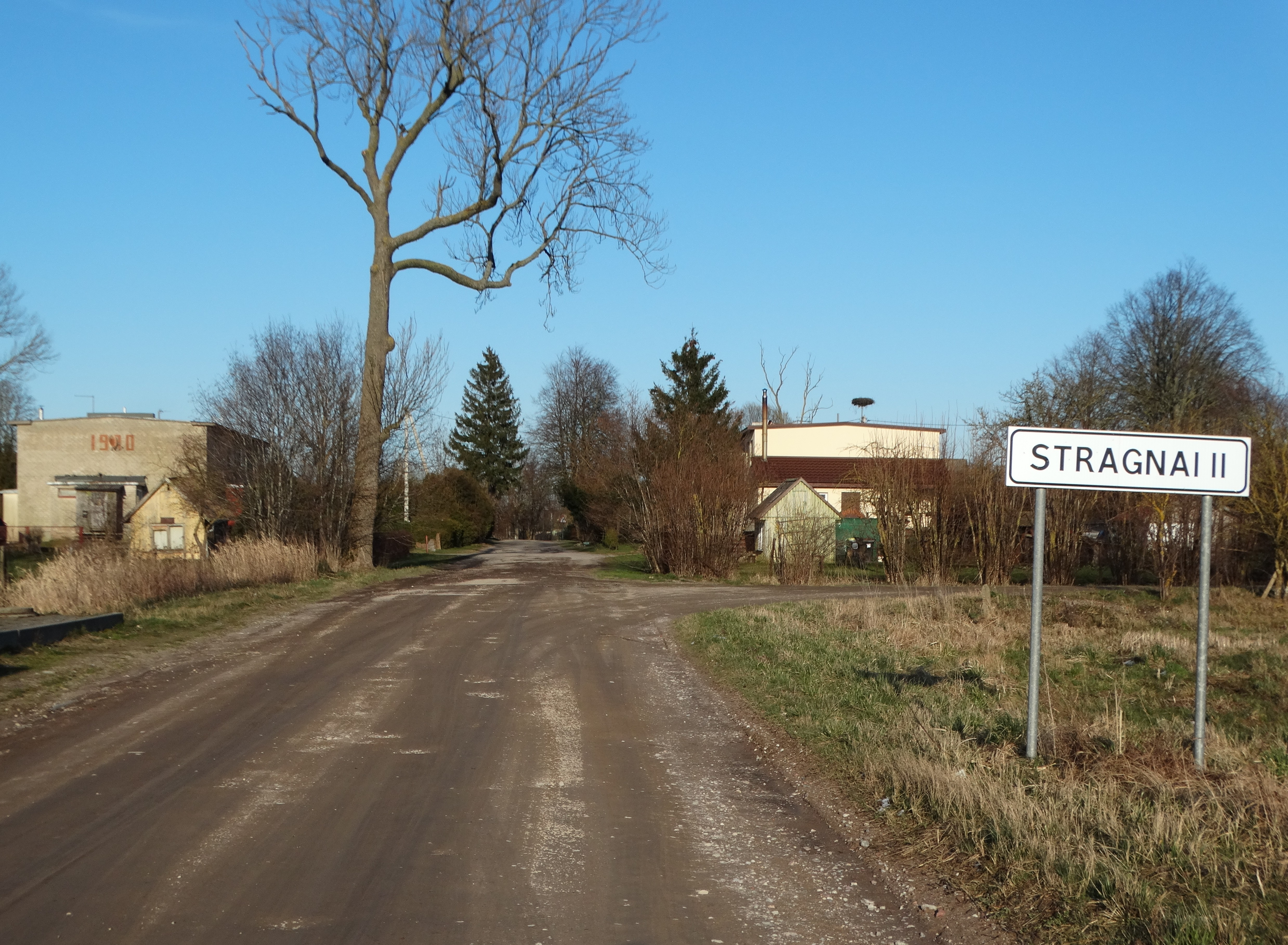

- Location in Lithuania
- Coordinates: 55°33′10.8″N 21°19′51.6″E
- Country: Lithuania
- County: Klaipėda County
- Municipality: Klaipėda District Municipality
- Eldership: Priekulė eldership

Population (2021)
  - Total: 254
- Time zone: UTC+2 (EET)
  - Summer (DST): UTC+3 (EEST)

Stragnai II is a village in Klaipėda District Municipality, in Klaipėda County, in western Lithuania. According to the 2021 census, the village had population of 254 inhabitants.

== History ==
On 5 January 2023 the village was flooded after Minija river broke through the flood walls.

== Demography ==
Historical population

Year	Pop.	±% p.a.
1871	114	—
1959	121	+0.07%
1970	302	+8.67%
1979	327	+0.89%

Year	Pop.	±% p.a.
1989	316	−0.34%
2001	295	−0.57%
2011	247	−1.76%
2021	254	+0.28%

Source: 1902, 1923, 1959 & 1970, 1979, 1989, 2001, 20112021
