= Povilas Varanauskas =

Lithuanian politician (1941–2026)

Povilas Varanauskas (21 February 1941 – 12 September 2026) was a Lithuanian politician. In 1990 he was among those who signed the Act of the Re-Establishment of the State of Lithuania. Varanauskas died on 12 September 2026, at the age of 85.
