= Bistrampolis Manor =

Coordinates: 55°35′49″N 24°21′22″E

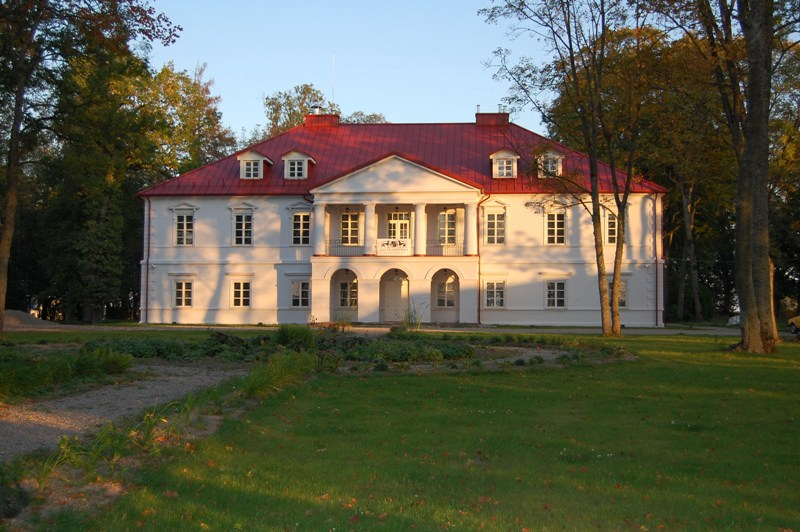
Bistrampolis Manor (2009)

Bistrampolis Manor is a former residential manor in Kučiai, Lithuania. Currently it is used as a hotel and coffee-restaurant. The manor stables are used as a concert hall, where various festivals takes place. The chapel is used as a museum of Lithuanian book smugglers. Bistrampolis Manor is also famous for its park.

== History ==
The manor was built in 1855 in the classical style. Its name ("Bistram" + "-polis") comes from its owners, the Baltic German noble Bistram family.
