= 2023 FAI F3P World Championships =

- Venue: Jonava Arena
- Location: Jonava, Lithuania
- Dates: 19–25 March

The 2023 FAI F3P World Championships of radio-controlled indoor aerobatic model aircraft were held from 19 to 25 March 2023 in Jonava, Lithuania. Medals were awarded in aerobatics and aerobatics freestyle to music (F3P-AFM)

Nelija Prapuolenaitytė from Lithuania became the first female pilot to participate at the World championships.

== Medalists ==
=== Medal table ===
* Host nation (Lithuania)

Rank	Nation	Gold	Silver	Bronze	Total
1	France	3	0	2	5
2	Austria	1	2	0	3
3	Lithuania*	1	1	0	2
4	Germany	0	1	1	2
5	Poland	0	1	0	1
6	Czech Republic	0	0	1	1
6	Switzerland	0	0	1	1
Totals (7 entries)		5	5	5	15

=== Seniors ===
Event	Gold	Silver	Bronze
Open Class F3P	Gernot Bruckmann (AUT)	Donatas Paužuolis (LTU)	Jeffrey Durochat (FRA)
Open Class F3P AFM	Donatas Paužuolis (LTU)	Gernot Bruckmann (AUT)	Jeffrey Durochat (FRA)
Team's F3P	France; Maxime Schmitt; Jeffrey Durochat; Sébastien Micek	Austria; Gernot Bruckmann; Andreas Wildauer; Gregor Zwickl	Switzerland; Philipp Schurmann; Sylvain Pasini; Ruedi Gallati

=== Juniors ===
Event	Gold	Silver	Bronze
Open Class F3P	Arnaud Maerte (FRA)	Caspar Halim (GER)	Radek Raja (CZE)
Open Class F3P AFM	Lucas Poncet (FRA)	Jakub Muranowicz (POL)	Caspar Halim (GER)

== Stage winners ==
Flight	Elite F3P	Junior F3P	Elite F3P AFM	Junior F3P AFM
Prelimineries
1	(Lithuania) Donatas Paužuolis	(France) Arnaud Maerte	(Austria) Gernot Bruckmann	(Poland) Jakub Muranowicz
2	(Lithuania) Donatas Paužuolis	(France) Arnaud Maerte	(Austria) Gernot Bruckmann	(France) Lucas Poncet
3	(Lithuania) Donatas Paužuolis	(France) Arnaud Maerte	(Austria) Gernot Bruckmann	(France) Lucas Poncet
4	(Austria) Gernot Bruckmann	(France) Arnaud Maerte	(Austria) Gernot Bruckmann	(France) Lucas Poncet
Semifinals
5	(Austria) Gernot Bruckmann	—N/a	(Lithuania) Donatas Paužuolis	—N/a
6	(Austria) Gernot Bruckmann	—N/a	(Austria) Gernot Bruckmann	—N/a
7	(Austria) Gernot Bruckmann	—N/a	(Lithuania) Donatas Paužuolis	—N/a
8	—N/a	—N/a	(Lithuania) Donatas Paužuolis	—N/a
