= Algimantas Žižiūnas =

Lithuanian photographer (1940–2023)

Algimantas Žižiūnas (10 January 1940 – 15 February 2023) was a Lithuanian photographer who worked in the fields of portraiture, ethnography, documentary, and photojournalism.

== Biography ==
Žižiūnas was born in Kaunas, Lithuania on 10 January 1940.

Between 1956 and 1957, Žižiūnas took part in All Saints’ Day events in Kaunas, Lithuania. The events were a student response to actions that took place in the Hungarian Revolution of 1956. Žižiūnas' actions resulted in his imprisonment for several days. From that time, Žižiūnas was a subject of KGB interest. On 23 October 2006, the 50th anniversary of the Hungarian revolution, Žižiūnas received the "Letters of Appreciation" from the Hungarian Embassy.

In 1963, Žižiūnas graduated from Kaunas Food Industry Technical School. For two years, he was employed by the Anykščiai winery. In 1965, Žižiūnas enrolled at Vilnius University to study journalism. At the time, he was employed by the Anykščiai district newspaper’s editorial office. Žižiūnas organized the first Anyksciai district Amateur Photographers’ Exhibition.

In 1970, Žižiūnas moved to Vilnius and worked for various editorial offices and publishing houses. He became a member of the Union of Lithuanian Art Photographers, and later joined the Lithuanian Journalists’ Union.

== Art career ==
Žižiūnas' art career began in 1977 with a portfolio of photographic portraits called Faces and Thoughts. He went on to exhibit his work in Lithuania and abroad. In 2003, Žižiūnas' work was published in Factum Lithuanian Book of Records (2003). On 11 November 2005, by the order of the minister of culture in the Government of Lithuania, Žižiūnas was given the title of "art creator". Žižiūnas worked as a journalist and art photographer until 2007. He received two gold medals for exhibitions at the Union of Lithuanian Art Photographers and a silver medal for his entry in an international photographic exhibition.

== Literary career ==
Žižiūnas authored poetry, short stories, and photonovels. His works for children include the poem, Ice Hole Secrets (2005). His works have been published in the children's magazine, Bitutė ("Bee") and the newspaper, Kregždutė ("Swallow").

== Selected works ==
- "Žena–88" ("Woman–88") in Czechoslovakia.
- "Anykščiai" (1963–2007)
- "Journalists" (1965–2007)
- "Lithuanian nature" (1958)
- "Moments" (1965–2007)
- "Oh, the music!" (between 1969–2007)
- "Hands" (1970–2007)
- "Ančiškis – Lithuania middle" (1970–2007)
- "Kola Peninsula" (1974–1990)
- "Faces and Thoughts" (1977–2007)
- "Visions" (1977–1990)
- "The Seas" (1978–2007)
- "Where the Urals, Siberia" (1972–1987)
- "Turkmenistan" (1989)
- "Artists" (1970–2007)
- "Scientists" (1970–2007)
- "Theater" (1970–2007)

== Photographic collections ==
- Lithuanian Union of Art Photographers, Vilnius
- Lithuanian Art Museum, Vilnius
- National Martynas Mažvydas Library, Vilnius

== See also ==
- Pristatytas Leidinyje International Center of Photography in Encyclopedia of Photography (1984) New York.
- Žurnalistikos enciklopedija (1997) "Encyclopaedia of Journalism", Vilnius.
- Kas yra kas Lietuvoje (2006, 2007, 2008) "Who's Who in Lithuania", Kaunas.
- Lietuvos rekordų knyga (2003)
- "Senjorai" Delfi website (2009)
- "Asmenybės. 1990 - 2015 m. Lietuvos pasiekimai" Leidybosidejos website (2015) "Lithuania's Lives and Achievements".
- Liubertaitė P. R. (Ed.) (2009) "Apvogtas ir nuniokotas fotomenininko archyvas" Literatūra ir menas, Number 3 (3220).
- Liubertaitė P. R. (2010) "Menininko problema: buvo, bet tarsi nebėra arba amžinas disidentas" Voruta, 20:4 (694) p. 14.
- Milkevičiūtė G. (2010) "Fotometraštininkas gyvas meile ir viltimi" Respublika 27 February 2010.
- Veličkaitė L. (2015) Garbingas apdovanojimas jubiliejaus proga Lietuvos aidas 27 January 2015.
- Pakalkienė R. (2016) "Paroda "Mano vizijų moterys" – kaip baigiamasis akordas" Lietuvos žinios 7 January 2016.
- Ogulevičiūtė J. K. (2016) "Kūrėjai Žižiūnai: su poezija visą laiką ir gyvenome" Alfa website 10 January 2016.
- Veličkaitė L. "Poetinių portretų paroda "Mano vizijų moterys"" Lietuvos aidas newspaper, 12 January 2016.
