= 2012 in Lithuania =

- Decades: 1990s; 2000s; 2010s; 2020s
- See also: Other events of 2012

Events in the year 2012 in Lithuania.

== Incumbents ==
- President: Dalia Grybauskaitė
- Prime Minister: Andrius Kubilius (until 13 December), Algirdas Butkevičius (starting 13 December)

== Events ==
=== January ===
- January 10 - Anykščiai took the title of a cultural capital of Lithuania.

=== October ===
- October 14 – Election to the Seimas and the referendum on the construction of a new nuclear power plant in the Republic of Lithuania.
- October 28 – The second poll of the Election to the Seimas.
- October 29 – switching to digital television

== Art and entertainment ==
- Lithuania in the Eurovision Song Contest 2012

== Sports ==
- 2011–12 Lithuanian Football Cup.
- 2012 European Track Championships

== Deaths ==
- 19 February – Stasys Stonkus, basketball player (born 1931).
- 3 November – Eugenija Pleškytė, actress (born 1938)
- 21 November – Algirdas Šocikas, boxer (born 1928)
- 26 November – Juilius Veselka, politician, former minister of economy (born 1943).
