= Gritė Maruškevičiūtė =

Lithuanian model (born 1989)

- Born: Gritė Maruškevičiūtė; 18 June 1989 (age 37); Šiauliai, Lithuanian SSR, Soviet Union
- Beauty pageant titleholder
- Title: Miss Lithuania 2010
- Years active: 2010–present

Gritė Maruškevičiūtė (born 18 June 1989 in Šiauliai) is a Lithuanian model and beauty pageant titleholder who won Miss Lithuania 2010. She represented Lithuania in Miss World 2010 on October and she reached top 40 at beach beauty event.

Maruškevičiūtė currently living in Vilnius and studied law and management in Mykolas Romeris University.

Preceded by Vaida Petraškaitė	Miss Lithuania; 2010	Succeeded by Ieva Gervinskaitė
