= Pabiržė Eldership =

Eldership of Lithuania

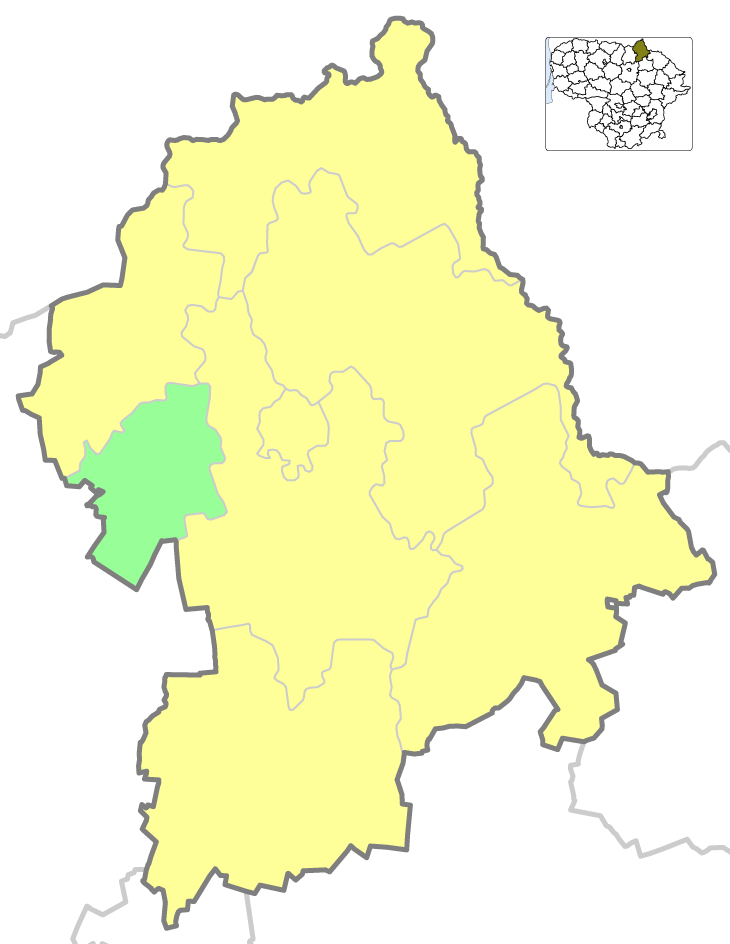
Pabiržė Eldership in Biržai District Municipality

The Pabiržė Eldership (Lithuanian: Pabiržės seniūnija) is an eldership of Lithuania, located in the Biržai District Municipality. In 2021 its population was 1,442.
