= 2021 in Lithuania =

- Decades: 2000s; 2010s; 2020s
- See also: Other events of 2021

== Incumbents ==
- President: Gitanas Nausėda
- Prime Minister: Ingrida Šimonytė

== Events ==
=== January ===
- January 1: Former Šiauliai University become a part of Vilnius University, resulting in forming Vilnius University Šiauliai Academy
- January 1: e-Residency of Lithuania program been launched.
- January 4: The beginning of the Lithuanian census of 2021. It will be the first census in Lithuania that happened electronically.
- January 13: Seimas (Lithuanian Parliament) awarded Freedom Prize (Lithuanian: Laisvės premija) to democratic opposition in Belarus. Award handed to Sviatlana Tsikhanouskaya
- January 14: Seimas (Lithuanian Parliament) appointed Renatas Pocius as head of Lithuanian National Energy Regulation Council.
- January 27: During reconstruction of Kleboniškis Bridge in Kaunas the construction of the bridge collapsed injuring 5 construction workers and killing one.

=== February ===
- February 4: Lithuanian Academy of Sciences awarded annual prizes in sciences:
  - Humanitarian sciences: Dalia Satkauskytė
  - Physics: Aldona Beganskienė & Aivaras Kareiva, Gediminas Niaura & Albertas Malinauskas
  - Biomedicine & Agriculture: Jurga Bernatonienė, Regina Gražulevičienė & Audrius Dėdelė
  - Technologies: Gediminas Račiukaitis & Mindaugas Gedvilas & Paulius Gečius

=== March ===
- March 2: Estonian president Kersti Kaljulaid visited Vilnius.

=== May ===
- May 25: after Ryanair Flight 4978 from Athens to Vilnius was forced to land at Minsk National Airport in Belarus, Lithuanian parliament announced ban for all flights from and to Lithuania via Belarus airspace.

=== June ===
- 2021 Lithuanian migrant crisis started.

=== August ===
- 9 August - China recalled its envoy to Lithuania following reports of Taiwanese government's plan to open an embassy in Vilnius.
- 10 August - Following large influx of migrants, Lithuanian parliament voted to build fence on its border with Belarus.

=== September ===
- 22 September - Lithuanian Defence Ministry advised citizens to throw away Chinese-made phones due to security concerns.

== Sports ==
- 6-7 March: 2021 Baltic States Swimming Championships in Klaipėda
- 20 March: Arturas Mastianica broke national 50 km racewalking record with 3:48:24 result.
- 9 May: Agnė Lukoševičiūtė broken national women's hammer throw record with 66.09 m results.
- 10–13 June: 2021 Baltic Women's Cup in Alytus & Jonava.
- 6 August: Laura Asadauskaitė won silver medal in Modern Pentathlon at the 2020 Summer Olympics
- 22-28 August: 2021 Platu 25 World Championship
- 12 September – 3 October: 2021 FIFA Futsal World Cup

National championships

- 20–21 March: 2021 Lithuanian Cross-Country Skiing Sprint Championships in Druskininkai
- 20–21 March: 2021 Lithuanian Rhythmic Gymnastics Championships in Vilnius
- 24–26 March: 2021 Lithuanian Biathlon Championships in Ignalina
- 1–2 May: 2021 Lithuanian Fencing Championships in Vilnius
- 8–9 May: 2021 Lithuanian Badminton Championships in Druskininkai
- 22 May: Final of 2020–21 Lithuanian Handball League
- 2–4 July: 2021 Lithuanian Canoe Sprint Championships in Trakai
- 3–4 July: 2021 Lithuanian Weightlifting Championships in Telšiai
- 17–18 July: 2021 Lithuanian Archery Championships in Alytus
- 20–22 August: 2021 Lithuanian Rowing Championships in Trakai
- 28–29 August: 2021 Lithuanian Wrestling Championships in Šiauliai
- 9–12 September: 2021 Lithuanian Sailing Championships in Nida
