= Žaliūkės =

- Village
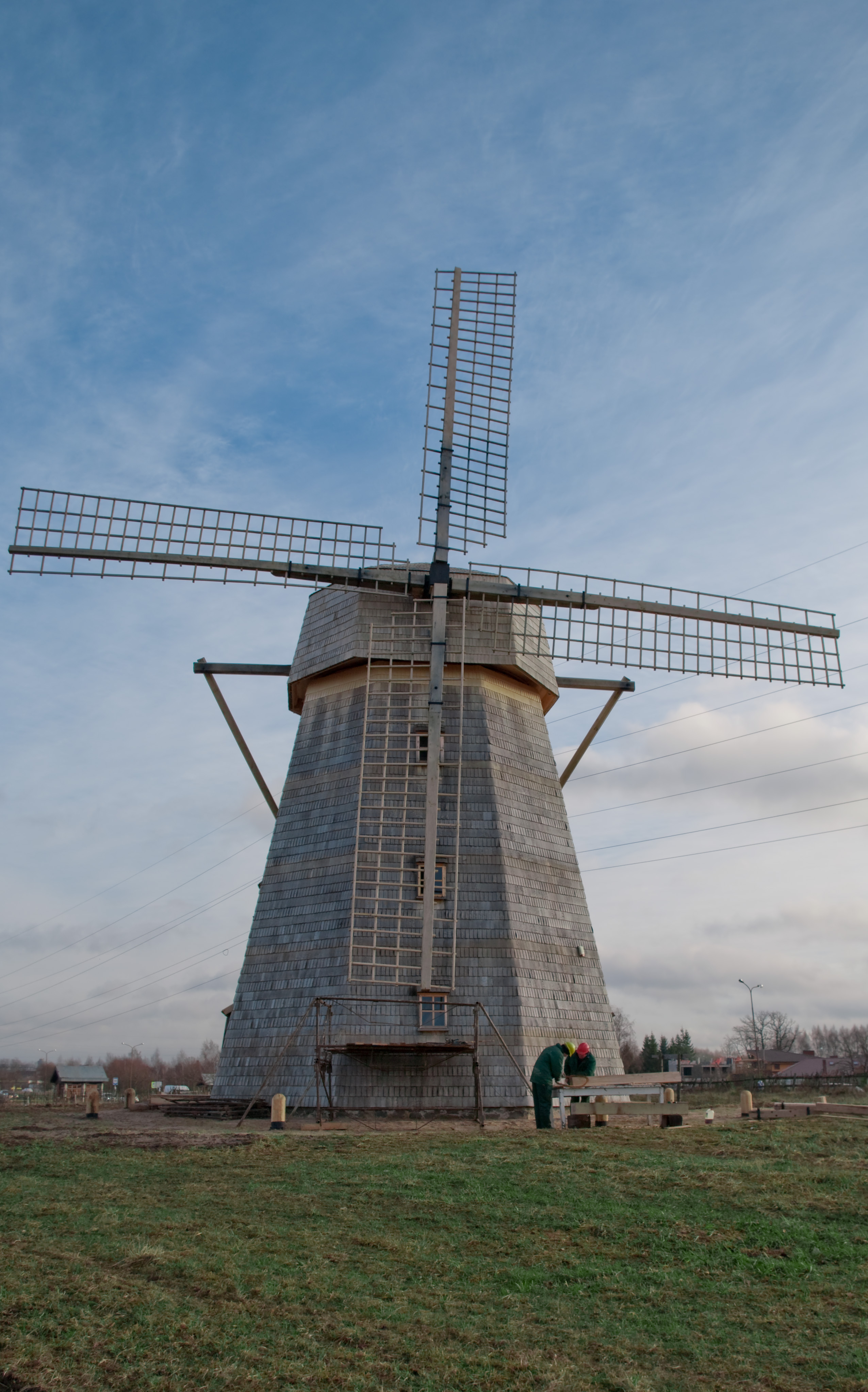

- Location in Lithuania
- Coordinates: 55°55′40.8″N 23°16′15.6″E
- Country: Lithuania
- County: Šiauliai County
- Municipality: Šiauliai

Population (2021)
  - Total: 193
- Time zone: UTC+2 (EET)
  - Summer (DST): UTC+3 (EEST)

Žaliūkės is a village in Šiauliai district municipality, in Šiauliai County, in northern Lithuania. According to the 2021 census, the village had population of 193 inhabitants.

== History ==
In 2022, the Lithuanian parliament Seimas voted in favour to change villages administration from Šiauliai District Municipality to Šiauliai City municipality. The changes came into effect on 1 January 2023.

== Demography ==
Historical population

Year	Pop.	±% p.a.
1923	146	—
1959	119	−0.57%
1970	118	−0.08%
1979	85	−3.58%

Year	Pop.	±% p.a.
1989	10	−19.27%
2001	9	−0.87%
2011	92	+26.17%
2021	193	+7.69%

Source: 1902, 1923, 1959 & 1970, 1979, 1989, 2001, 20112021
