= Eugenijus Karpavičius =

Lithuanian illustrator

Eugenijus Karpavičius (19 October 1953 – 26 January 2010) was a Lithuanian illustrator. He represented Lithuania at the Frankfurt Book Fair in 2002. His works are on display in the Lithuanian National Museum.
