= 2022 in Lithuania =

- Decades: 2000s; 2010s; 2020s
- See also: Other events of 2022

== Incumbents ==
- President: Gitanas Nausėda
- Prime Minister: Ingrida Šimonytė

== Events ==
- January 19 – Lithuanian Defense Minister Arvydas Anušauskas warned that the presence of Russian Armed Forces in Belarus posed a "direct threat" to Lithuania.
- March 2 – Lithuania voted in favor of a United Nations resolution condemning Russia for its invasion of Ukraine.
- April 4 – Lithuania expelled the Russian ambassador and closed the Russian consulate in Klaipėda.
- April 19 – The Lithuanian parliament (Seimas) passed a ban on public displays of symbols associated with Russia's war against Ukraine.
- May 10 – The Seimas recognized Russian actions in Ukraine as genocide and labeled Russia a terrorist state.
- May 12 – In response to rising energy prices, the government approved a compensation plan for electricity and gas prices, allocating a budget of 570 million euros.
- November 7 – Lithuania opened a trade mission in Taiwan.
- December 5 – An open-ended strike by public transport workers in Vilnius began, with workers demanding better working conditions and higher wages. The strike ended on December 22 after an agreement was reached between the municipal company and the trade union.
- December 15 – Lithuania authorized the purchase of eight HIMARS systems from the United States, marking the largest arms purchase in the country's history.
