= Loreta Graužinienė =

Lithuanian politician

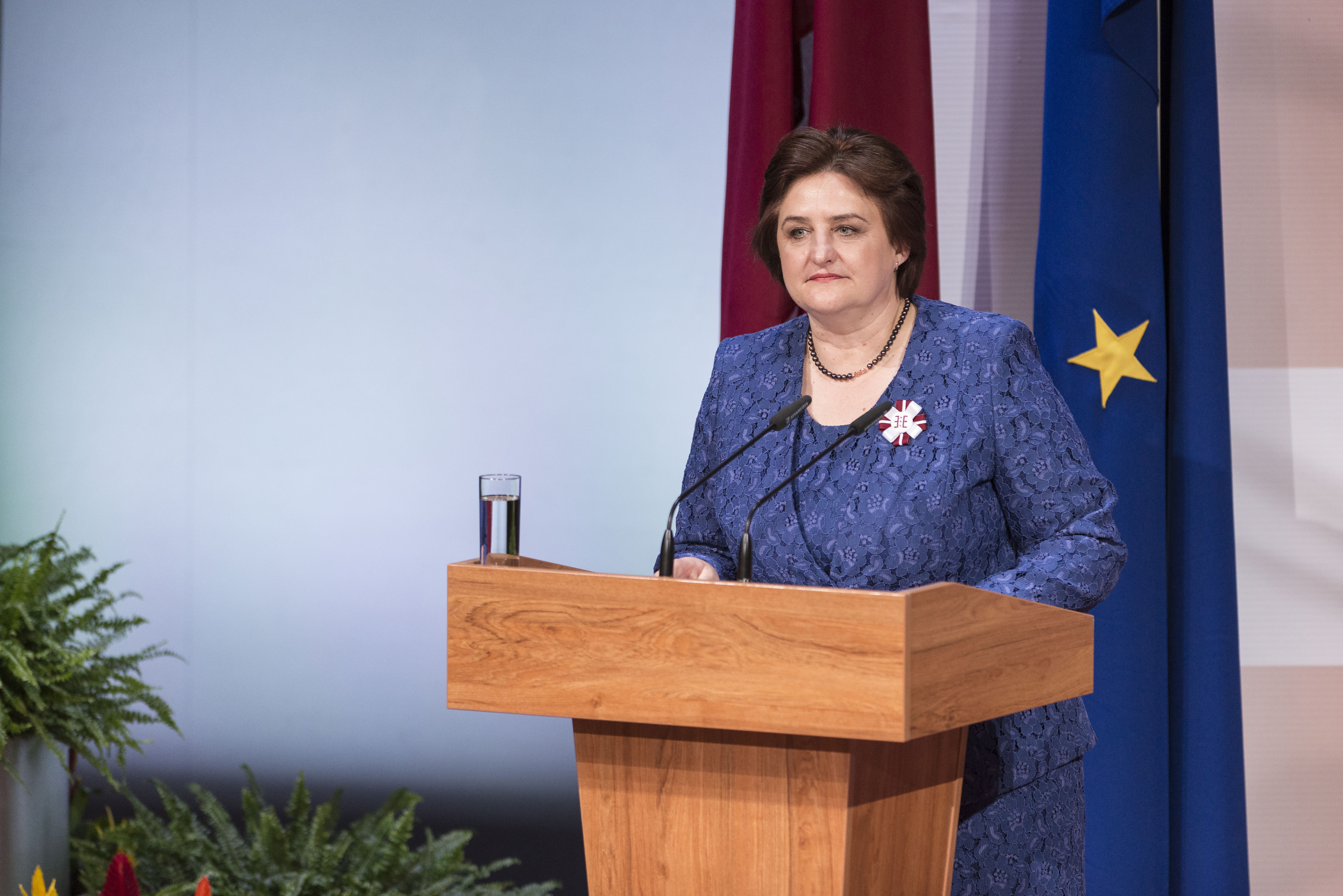
- Graužinienė in 2015

Speaker of the Seimas
- In office 3 October 2013 – 14 November 2016
- President: Dalia Grybauskaitė
- Preceded by: Vydas Gedvilas
- Succeeded by: Viktoras Pranckietis

Personal details
- Born: Loreta Šniokaitė; 10 January 1963 (age 63) Rokiškis, Lithuanian Soviet Socialist Republic
- Party: Labour
- Spouse: Julius Graužinis
- Children: 2

Loreta Graužinienė (born 10 January 1963) is a Lithuanian politician and altruist former Speaker of the Seimas and former leader of the Lithuanian Labour party.

== Life ==
Graužinienė was born in Rokiškis in northeastern Lithuania. She studied at Rokiškio Juozas Tumas-Vaižgantas gymnasium. She is married and has two children. Graužinienė has been the member of the Lithuanian parliament, the Seimas since 2004. She is the former leader of the Lithuanian Labour Party and was the speaker of the Seimas between October 2013 and November 2016. She unsuccessfully ran in the 2009 Lithuanian presidential election.

In the Seimas, she has served the Audit Committee, European Affairs Committee, the Labour and Social Affairs Committee and the Budget and Finance Committee.
