= 2015 in Lithuania =

- Decades: 1990s; 2000s; 2010s; 2020s
- See also: Other events of 2015

Events in the year 2015 in Lithuania.

== Incumbents ==
- President: Dalia Grybauskaitė
- Prime Minister: Algirdas Butkevičius

== Events ==
=== January ===
- 1 January - Lithuania adopts the Euro and joins Eurozone.
- 1 January - first commercial operations in Klaipėda LNG FSRU.
- 1 January - National Cyber Security Centre of Lithuania was established.
- 1 January - Suicide Prevention Centre of Lithuania was established.
- 15 January - a big storm left 15,000 people without electricity, mostly in Klaipėda county.
- 16 January - second honorary consulate of Estonia in Lithuania was opened in the city of Kaunas.
- 26 January - Israel opened its embassy in Vilnius.
- 28 January - the Vilnius People's Rupublic internet hoax was initiated.

=== February ===
- 6 February - honorary consulate of India in Lithuania was opened in the capital city of Vilnius.
- 9 February - Aistė Diržiūtė becomes the first Lithuanian actress to win Shooting Stars Award.
- 28 February - Lithuania signs a trade agreement to buy liquefied natural gas from the United States in a move aimed at reducing heavy dependence on Russian gas deliveries.

=== March ===
- 1 March - Municipal elections held in Lithuania with first ever direct mayoral elections held together.
- 18 March - Polish-Lithuanian Chamber of Commerce was established.
- 19 March - Lithuanian Parliament Seimas voted in favour of conscription restitution.
- 20 March - NATO general Jean-Paul Palomeros has signed the NATO-Lithuanian agreement on the legal status of NATO command and control centres in Lithuania.
- 25 March - Lithuania's Social Democratic Prime Minister Algirdas Butkevičius opposed of proposed same-sex partnerships legalization.
- 29 March - archaeologists announced about the thousand-year-old grave discovery near the village of Kvietiniai, Klaipėda District Municipality.

=== April ===
- 9 April - Lithuania was invited to start accession talks with Organisation for Economic Co-operation and Development.
- 13 April - Darius Jauniškis appointed as the head of the State Security Department.
- 14 April - International Monetary Fund (IMF) classified Lithuania as advanced economy.
- 17 April - Opened a new Honorary Consulate of Lithuania in Richmond, Virginia, United States.
- 23 April - Lithuania banned wearing separate elements of military uniforms and insignia in public.
- 28 April - Lithuania opens honorary consulate in Jeddah, Saudi Arabia.

=== May ===
- 4 May - Biggest stadium in the country - Žalgiris Stadium was sold for redevelopment and eventually de-establishment.
- 7 May - President Dalia Grybauskaitė rejected Vydas Gedvilas as candidate for education minister.
- 9 May - Moody‘s upgraded Lithuanian credit rating to A3.
- 15 May - district heating plant opened in Elektrėnai, that is operating on biofeuls.
- 16 May - 2 Lithuanian pilots died in aviation accident when Klaipėda Avialines plane Antonov An-2 dropped down to the Baltic Sea.
- 23 May - Air Lituanica, Lithuanian airline owned by the municipality of Vilnius, has announced that it is stopping operations.
- 26 May - Vilnius Intermodal Terminal was opened.
- 27 May - Audronė Pitrėnienė appointed as education and science minister of Lithuania.

=== June ===
- 1 June - Lithuanian General Consulate opened in Los Angeles, United States
- 1 June - Laima Jurevičienė appointed as country's new ambassador to the Council of Europe.
- 7 June - Klaipėda Port announces start of international container distribution centre.
- 9 June - cable laying works of NordBalt were completed.
- 18 June - in Batumi, Minister of Foreign Affairs of Lithuania Linas Linkevičius and Minister of Foreign Affairs of Georgia Tamar Beruchashvili opened a second Honorary Consulate of Lithuania in Georgia.

== Deaths ==
- 29 March - Petras Dirgėla, writer and recipient of the Lithuanian National Prize in 2003.
- 3 April - Algirdas Vaclovas Patackas, politician and signer of the Act of the Re-Establishment of the State of Lithuania.
- 6 April - Romualdas Ozolas, politician and signer of the Act of the Re-Establishment of the State of Lithuania.
- 6 October - Stasys Povilaitis, variety songs singer, maestro.
- 8 October - Galina Dauguvietytė, actor, TV director.
