= Miss Lithuania =

Beauty pageant

Mis Lietuva
- Formation: 1988; 38 years ago
- Type: Beauty pageant
- Headquarters: Vilnius
- Location: Lithuania
- Members: Miss Universe; Miss World; Miss International
- Official language: Lithuanian
- President: Edward Walson

Miss Lithuania (Lithuanian: Mis Lietuva) is a national Beauty pageant in Lithuania.

== History ==
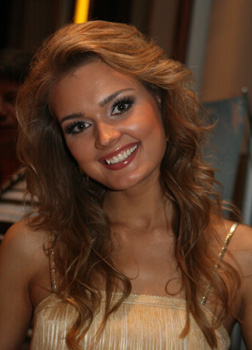
Miss Lithuania 2007 Jurgita Jurkutė

Miss Lithuania began in 1988, and Lithuania debuted at the Miss World 1993 competition. The pageant traditionally broadcast live on "Lietuvos rytas TV". Since 2012, the Miss Lithuania Organization sends the second title to the Miss Universe pageant. The Miss Lithuania pageant organizes by Benas Gudelis in Vilnius, Lithuania. Due to a lack of sponsorship, the contest was cancelled in 2015 and not held since, nor any representatives sent to international pageants.

In 2019 Edward Walson took over the franchise of Miss Universe in Lithuania by holding a Miss Universe Lithuania competition. Walson owned Miss Universe Italy and Miss Universo Portugal between 2016 and 2017.

== Titleholders ==
=== Miss Lithuania 1988—2014 ===
The following is a list of winners. From 1988 to present.

Year	Miss Lietuva
1988	Ingrida Mikelionytė
1989	Liucija Gruzdytė
1992	Rasa Kukenytė
1993	Jūratė Mikutaitė
1994	Jurga Tautkutė
1995	Gabrielė Bartkutė
1996	Daiva Anužytė
1997	Asta Vyšniauskaitė
1998	Kristina Pakarnaitė
1999	Renata Mackevičiūtė
2000	Martyna Bimbaitė
2001	Oksana Semenišina
2002	Vaida Grikšaitė
2004	Agnė Maliaukaitė
2005	Gabrielė Saldaitė
2007	Jurgita Jurkutė
2008	Gabrielė Martirosianaitė
2009	Vaida Petraškaitė
2010	Gritė Maruškevičiūtė
2011	Ieva Gervinskaitė
2012	Rasa Vereniūtė
2013	Rūta Elžbieta Mazurevičiūtė
2014	Agnė Kavaliauskaitė

=== Miss Universe Lithuania 2019—Present ===
The following is a list of winners. From 2019 to present.

Year	Miss Universe Lithuania
2019	Paulita Baltrusaityte

== Big Four pageants representatives ==
=== Miss Universe Lithuania ===
- : Declared as Winner
- : Ended as runner-up or top 5/6 qualification
- : Ended as one of the finalists or semifinalists
- : Ended as special awards winner

Miss Lietuva has started to send a Miss Lithuania to Miss Universe from 2012. In recent years a second title of Miss Lithuania Beauty Pageant crowned as "Miss Universe Lithuania". On occasion, when the winner does not qualify (due to age) for either contest, a runner-up is sent.

Year	County	Miss Lietuva Universe	Placement at Miss Universe	Special Award(s)
2026	–	Olga Bykadorova	TBA	
Did not compete between 2020—2025
Due to the impact of COVID-19 pandemic, no representative between 2020—2023
2019	Vilnius	Paulita Baltrusaityte	Unplaced	
Miss Lietuva
Did not compete between 2015—2018
2014	Vilnius	Patricija Belousova	Unplaced	
2013	Panevėžys	Simona Burbaitė	Unplaced	
2012	Šiauliai	Greta Mikalauskytė	Unplaced	
1995	Klaipėda	Ieva Šimkūnaitė	Did not compete	
1994	Kaunas	Loreta Brusokaitė	Did not compete	

=== Miss World Lithuania ===
- : Declared as Winner
- : Ended as runner-up or top 5/6 qualification
- : Ended as one of the finalists or semifinalists
- : Ended as special awards winner

Miss Lietuva has started to send a Miss Lithuania to Miss World from 1993. In recent years the Miss Lithuania Beauty Pageant crowned a winner as "Miss World Lithuania". On occasion, when the winner does not qualify (due to age) for either contest, a runner-up is sent.

Year	County	Miss Lietuva World	Placement at Miss World	Special Award(s)
Did not compete since 2015—Present
2014	Vilnius	Agnė Kavaliauskaitė	Unplaced	
2013	Vilnius	Rūta Elžbieta Mazurevičiūtė	Unplaced	
2012	Vilnius	Rasa Vereniūtė	Unplaced	
2011	Klaipėda	Ieva Gervinskaitė	Unplaced	
2010	Vilnius	Gritė Maruškevičiūtė	Unplaced	
2009	Kaunas	Vaida Petraškaitė	Unplaced	
2008	Kaunas	Gabrielė Martirosianaitė	Unplaced	
2007	Telšiai	Jurgita Jurkutė	Unplaced	
Did not compete between 2005—2006
2004	Panevėžys	Agnė Maliaukaitė	Unplaced	
2003	—	Vaida Grikšaitė	Unplaced	
2002	—	Oksana Semenišina	Unplaced	
2001	Did not compete - Pageant Delayed until December 2001			
2000	—	Martyna Bimbaitė	Unplaced	
1999	—	Renata Mackevičiūtė	Unplaced	
1998	—	Kristina Pakarnaitė	Unplaced	
1997	—	Asta Vyšniauskaitė	Unplaced	
1996	—	Daiva Anužytė	Unplaced	
1995	—	Gabrielė Bartkutė	Unplaced	
1994	—	Jurga Tautkutė	Did not compete	
1993	—	Jūratė Mikutaitė	Unplaced	

=== Miss International Lithuania ===
- : Declared as Winner
- : Ended as runner-up or top 5/6 qualification
- : Ended as one of the finalists or semifinalists
- : Ended as special awards winner

Miss International Lithuania has opened to call the official casting format to Lithuanian delegate to Miss International.

Year	County	Miss Lietuva International	Placement at Miss International	Special Award(s)
2023	Vilnius	Irmina Preišegalavičiūtė	Unplaced	
Did not compete since 2018—2022
2017	Vilnius	Patricija Belousova	Unplaced	
Did not compete between 2014—2016
2013	Vilnius	Elma Segzdaviciute	Top 15	Miss Photogenic
Did not compete between 2011—2012
2010	Vilnius	Enrika Trepkute	Unplaced	
