= 2013 in Lithuania =

- Decades: 1990s; 2000s; 2010s; 2020s
- See also: Other events of 2013

Events in the year 2013 in Lithuania.

== Incumbents ==
- President: Dalia Grybauskaitė
- Prime Minister: Algirdas Butkevičius

== Events ==
- Amber Grid established

== Art and entertainment ==
- Lithuania in the Eurovision Song Contest 2013 hosted in Malmö, Sweden.
- Debut of Secret Story (Lithuanian TV series)

== Sports ==
- 2012–13 Lithuanian Football Cup
- 2013 European Track Championships
- 2013 Baltic Chain Tour
- 2013–14 Lithuanian Handball League
- 2013–14 Lithuanian Hockey League season
- 2013–14 Lithuanian Women's Handball League
- Lithuania at the 2013 Summer Universiade
- Lithuania at the 2013 World Aquatics Championships
- Lithuania at the 2013 World Championships in Athletics
