= 2009 Lithuanian presidential election =

- 17 May 2009
- Turnout: 51.76%
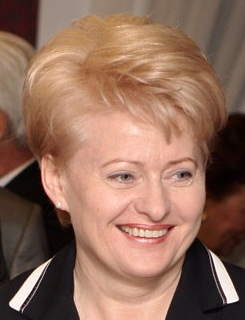

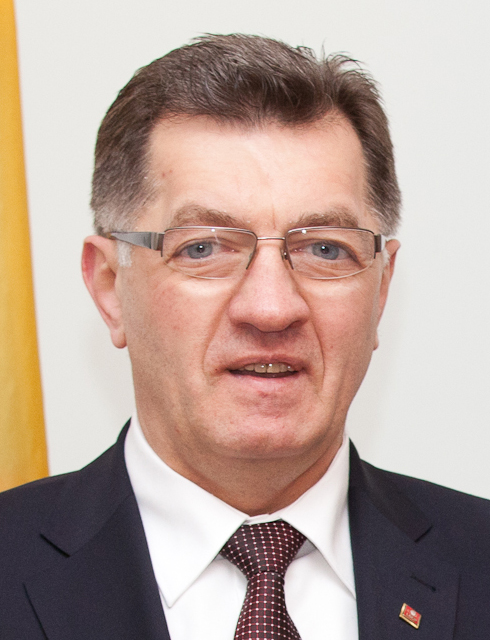

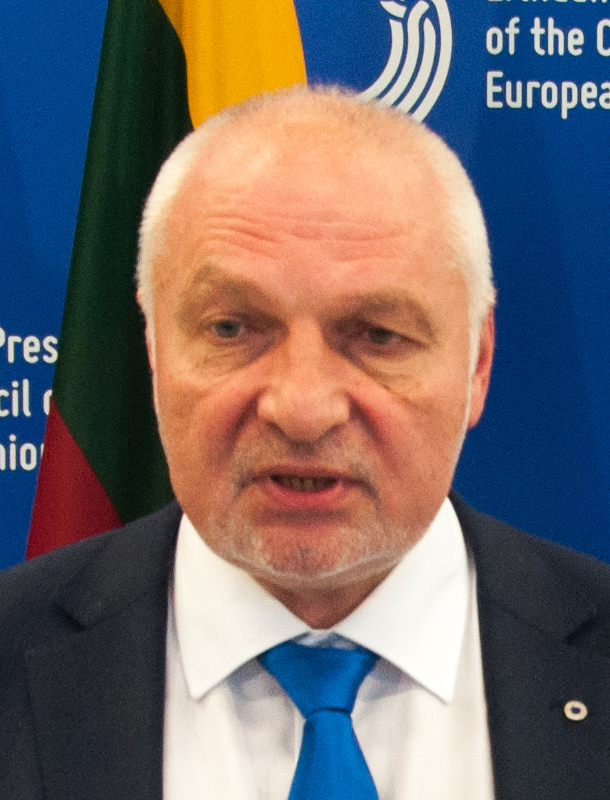
Nominee	Dalia Grybauskaitė	Algirdas Butkevičius	Valentinas Mazuronis
Party	Independent	LSDP	TT
Popular vote	950,407	162,665	84,656
Percentage	69.09%	11.82%	6.15%
President before election
Valdas Adamkus
Independent
Elected President
Dalia Grybauskaitė
Independent

Presidential elections were held in Lithuania on 17 May 2009. A run-off would have been held on 7 June 2009, but was not necessary as Dalia Grybauskaitė was elected with 69% of the vote, with voter turnout just over the 50% threshold for the result to be validated. Grybauskaitė took office on 12 July as the country's first female president.

This was only the second time since the restoration of independence that a Lithuanian president was elected without the need for a runoff, the first being in 1993, when Algirdas Brazauskas was elected with 61% in the first round.

== Candidates ==
The Electoral Commission registered 14 candidates for the elections, whilst Vladimir Romanov's application was rejected. However, six candidates (Jonas Jankauskas, Vytautas Kundrotas, Algimantas Matulevičius, Algirdas Pilvelis, Vidmantas Sadauskas and Zigmas Vaišvila) failed to collect the 20,000 signatures required, and Seimas Speaker Arūnas Valinskas (National Resurrection Party) withdrew his candidacy.

Seven candidates collected enough signatures to participate in the elections:

- Dalia Grybauskaitė, incumbent European Commissioner for Financial Programming and the Budget, former Minister of Finance (2001–2004)
- Valentinas Mazuronis (Order and Justice), member of the Seimas since 2004
- Kazimiera Prunskienė, first Prime Minister of Lithuania (1990–1991) and former Minister of Agriculture (2004–2008)
- Česlovas Jezerskas, Brigadier General of Lithuanian Armed Forces and wrestler
- Valdemar Tomaševski (Electoral Action of Poles in Lithuania), member of the Seimas since 2000
- Loreta Graužinienė (Labour Party), member of the Seimas since 2004
- Algirdas Butkevičius (Social Democratic Party), former Minister of Finance (2004–2005) and former Minister of Transport and Communications (2006–2008)

Grybauskaitė was supported by the Homeland Union and Liberal Movement.

== Opinion polls ==
According to the opinion polls, Grybauskaitė was the undisputed leader in the race for the Presidency.

== Results ==
Candidate	Party	Votes	%
Dalia Grybauskaitė	Independent	950,407	69.09
Algirdas Butkevičius	Social Democratic Party	162,665	11.82
Valentinas Mazuronis	Order and Justice	84,656	6.15
Valdemar Tomaševski	Electoral Action of Poles in Lithuania	65,255	4.74
Kazimira Prunskienė	Lithuanian Peasant Popular Union	53,778	3.91
Loreta Graužinienė	Labour Party	49,686	3.61
Česlovas Jezerskas	Independent	9,191	0.67
Total		1,375,638	100.00
Valid votes		1,375,638	98.73
Invalid/blank votes		17,640	1.27
Total votes		1,393,278	100.00
Registered voters/turnout		2,691,603	51.76
Source: Central Election Commission
