= Rumpiškėnai =

Village in Panevėžys County, northeastern Lithuania

- Village
- Location within Lithuania
- Coordinates: 56°0′7.2″N 25°19′22.8″E
- Country: Lithuania
- County: Panevėžys County
- Municipality: Rokiškis District Municipality
- Eldership: Kazliškis Eldership

Population (2021)
  - Total: 34
- Time zone: UTC+2 (EET)
  - Summer (DST): UTC+3 (EEST)

Rumpiškėnai is a village in Panevėžys County, in northeastern Lithuania. According to the 2021 census, the village had a population of 34 inhabitants.

== History ==
On 28 April 2023, an active wartime 81mm landmine discovered in Rumpiškėnai, Rokiškis District Municipality. The explosive was detonated and destroyed by special forces.

== Demography ==
Historical population

Year	Pop.	±% p.a.
1902	155	—
1923	187	+0.90%
1959	92	−1.95%
1970	110	+1.64%
1979	62	−6.17%

Year	Pop.	±% p.a.
1989	36	−5.29%
2001	35	−0.23%
2011	35	+0.00%
2021	34	−0.29%

Source: 1902, 1923, 1959 & 1970, 1979, 1989, 2001, 20112021
