= Vištytis Eldership =

Eldership of Lithuania

The Vištytis Eldership (Lithuanian: Vištyčio seniūnija) is an eldership of Lithuania, located in the Vilkaviškis District Municipality. In 2021 its population was 826.
