= 2024 in Lithuania =

- Decades: 2000s; 2010s; 2020s
- See also: Other events of 2024

Events in the year 2024 in Lithuania.

== Incumbents ==
- President: Gitanas Nausėda
- Prime Minister: Ingrida Šimonytė (until 12 December); Gintautas Paluckas (since 12 December)

== Events ==
=== January ===
- 8–14 January – 2024 European Figure Skating Championships in Kaunas

=== March ===
- 27 March – 2024 Lithuanian presidential election: A Special Investigative committee of the Seimas releases its findings, accusing President Gitanas Nausėda of receiving illegal support from the head of the State Security Department and for recruiting members of the Belarusian and Russian security services for his election campaign. Nauseda rejects the findings, accusing them of being politically motivated.

=== April ===
- 27 April–3 May – 2024 IIHF World Championship Division I B in Vilnius

=== May ===
- 9 May – An arson attack blamed on Russian intelligence services is carried out on an IKEA store in Vilnius.
- 12 May –
  - 2024 Lithuanian presidential election: Lithuanians are called to the polls to elect the President of Lithuania. Incumbent President Gitanas Nausėda and Prime Minister Ingrida Šimonytė advance to the run-off election.
  - 2024 Lithuanian constitutional referendum: A proposal to allow dual citizenship fails to pass due to insufficient turnout.
- 26 May – 2024 Lithuanian presidential election (second round): President Gitanas Nausėda wins reelection with 74.46% of the vote.
- 27 May – A court in Kaunas convicts Jonava District Municipality mayor Mindaugas Sinkevičius of abuse of office, falsification of documents, and misappropriation and imposes a 12,500 euro-fine on him as well as a ban on holding public office for three years.

=== June ===
- 9 June – 2024 European Parliament election: The Homeland Union emerges as the largest party in the Lithuanian contingent to the European Parliament.
- 26 June – The leaders of Poland, Lithuania, Latvia, and Estonia call on the European Union to construct a €2.5 billion (US$2.67 billion) defence line between them and Russia and Belarus to secure the EU from military, economic, and migrant-related threats.

=== July ===
- 16 July – The Baltic states announce their exit from the Russian and Belarusian electricity grids along with plans to synchronize their grid with the continental Europe grid effective 9 February 2025.
- 17 July – Lithuania issues a ban on Belarus-registered passenger vehicles entering its territory.
- 29 July – One person is killed in Vilnius by a falling tree during a storm that causes record amounts of rainfall in Šiauliai, Telšiai and Šilalė.

=== October ===
- 13 October – 2024 Lithuanian parliamentary election (first round): The Social Democratic Party of Lithuania emerges as the largest party in party-list voting, winning 18 of 70 contested seats.
- 27 October – 2024 Lithuanian parliamentary election (second round): The Social Democratic Party of Lithuania wins a plurality of seats in the Seimas, with 52 of 141 seats, while the ruling Homeland Union finishes at second with 20 seats.

=== November ===
- 9 November – The Social Democratic Party of Lithuania, the Union of Democrats "For Lithuania" and the Dawn of Nemunas agree to form a coalition government.
- 17 November – A section of a submarine internet cable running under the Baltic Sea between Lithuania and Sweden is severed, reducing internet capacity in Lithuania by a fifth.
- 19 November – Gintautas Paluckas of the Social Democratic Party of Lithuania is nominated as prime minister by President Nausėda.
- 21 November – Gintautas Paluckas is confirmed as prime minister by the Seimas, having received 84 votes against 36 negative votes and six abstentions.
- 25 November – Swiftair Flight 5960: A Boeing 737-476(SF) aircraft operated by DHL for Swiftair crashes into a residential area in Vilnius, killing one person (captain) and injuring three others (2nd pilot and two assistants).
- 29 November – Lithuania expels three staff of the Chinese embassy in Vilnius for violations of Lithuanian law and the Vienna Convention on Diplomatic Relations.

=== December ===
- 9 December – A politician of the Homeland Union is arrested on suspicion of spying for Russia.
- 12 December – The Paluckas Cabinet is inaugurated.
- 15 December – Lithuania bans Georgian Prime Minister Irakli Kobakhidze from entering the country for overseeing human rights abuses in Georgia.
- 18 December – The Constitutional Court strikes down the Law on the Protection of Minors from Negative Effects of Public Information, which prohibited minors from being informed about same-sex relationships, as unconstitutional.
- 19 December – The Seimas bans nationals of Russia, Belarus, and China from joining the Lithuanian Armed Forces and the Lithuanian Riflemen's Union.

== Art and entertainment ==
- List of Lithuanian submissions for the Academy Award for Best International Feature Film
- List of 2024 box office number-one films in Lithuania

== Environment ==
- 7 February - 300 litres of crude oil spilled into the Baltic Sea near Būtingė oil terminal.

== Holidays ==
- 1 January - New Year's Day
- 16 February – Independence Day
- 11 March - Independence Restoration Day
- 31 March - Easter Sunday
- 1 April - Easter Monday
- 1 May - International Workers' Day
- 5 May - Mother's Day
- 2 June - Father's Day
- 24 June - St. John's Day
- 6 July – Statehood Day
- 15 August - Assumption Day
- 1 November - All Saints' Day
- 24 December - Christmas Eve
- 25 December - Christmas Day
- 26 December – 2nd Day of Christmas

== See also ==
- 2024 in the European Union
- 2024 in Europe
- Lithuania at the 2024 Summer Olympics
