= Viktoras Pranckietis =

Lithuanian agronomist and politician

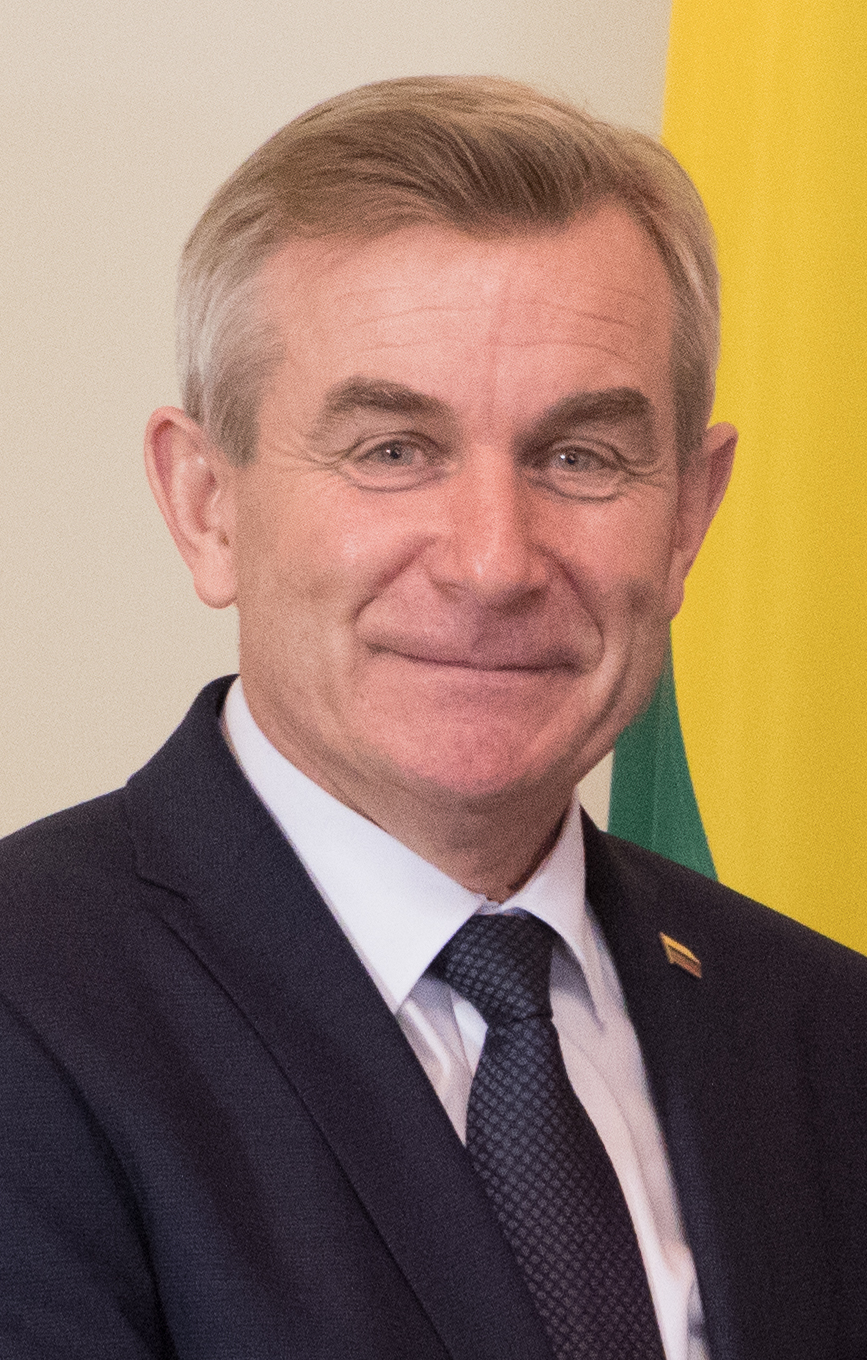
- Pranckietis in 2016

Speaker of the Seimas
- In office 14 November 2016 – 12 November 2020
- President: Dalia Grybauskaitė; Gitanas Nausėda
- Preceded by: Loreta Graužinienė
- Succeeded by: Viktorija Čmilytė-Nielsen

Member of Seimas
- Incumbent
- Assumed office 14 November 2016
- Preceded by: Position established
- Constituency: Raudondvaris

Personal details
- Born: 26 July 1958 (age 67) Ruteliai, Lithuanian Soviet Socialist Republic
- Party: Liberal Movement (2020–present)
- Other political affiliations: Lithuanian Farmers and Greens Union (until 2019)
- Profession: Agronomist, politician

Viktoras Pranckietis (born 26 July 1958) is a Lithuanian agronomist and politician. He was the speaker of the Seimas.

== Early life and education ==
Pranckietis was born in Ruteliai village, near Tytuvėnai, in Kelmė District Municipality. He graduated from high school in Tytuvėnai in 1973 and continued studying there at an agricultural technical school, afterwards briefly working at a local farm as an agronomist. Between 1977 and 1982, Pranckietis studied at the Lithuanian Academy of Agriculture (now Aleksandras Stulginskis University), earning a degree in scientific agronomy. In 1998, he earned a doctoral degree in biomedicine.

Pranckietis spent most of his career working at the Lithuanian Academy of Agriculture, starting as a research assistant, and later working as the dean of the faculty of agronomy. He has written numerous scientific papers, books and textbooks, specializing in gardening and acted as a consultant on the subject for numerous specialized TV shows in Lithuania.

== Political career ==
Pranckietis is a former member of the Lithuanian Farmers and Greens Union. Since 2014, he has served as the deputy chairman of the party. He first unsuccessfully ran for a seat in the Lithuanian parliament, the Seimas, in 2012, but was elected to the council of Kaunas District Municipality in 2015. In the parliamentary elections in October 2016, Pranckietis was elected to the parliament in the single-member constituency of Raudondvaris. With Lithuanian Farmers and Greens Union being the largest party in the parliament, Pranckietis was elected as the Speaker of the Seimas in November 2016. In 2018 and 2019, there were two attempts to have no confidence vote on Pranckietis' speakership, but none of them prevailed.

== Honours ==
=== Foreign honours ===
- Italy: Knight Grand Cross of the Order of Merit of the Italian Republic (14 January 2019)
- Poland: Grand Cross of the Order of Merit of the Republic of Poland (1 July 2019)

Seimas
Preceded by Raminta Popovienė (Kaunas and Kėdainiai); Donatas Jankauskas (Kaunas rural district)	Member of the Seimas for Raudondvaris; 2016–present	Incumbent
