= Statehood Day (Lithuania) =

Lithuanian annual public holiday

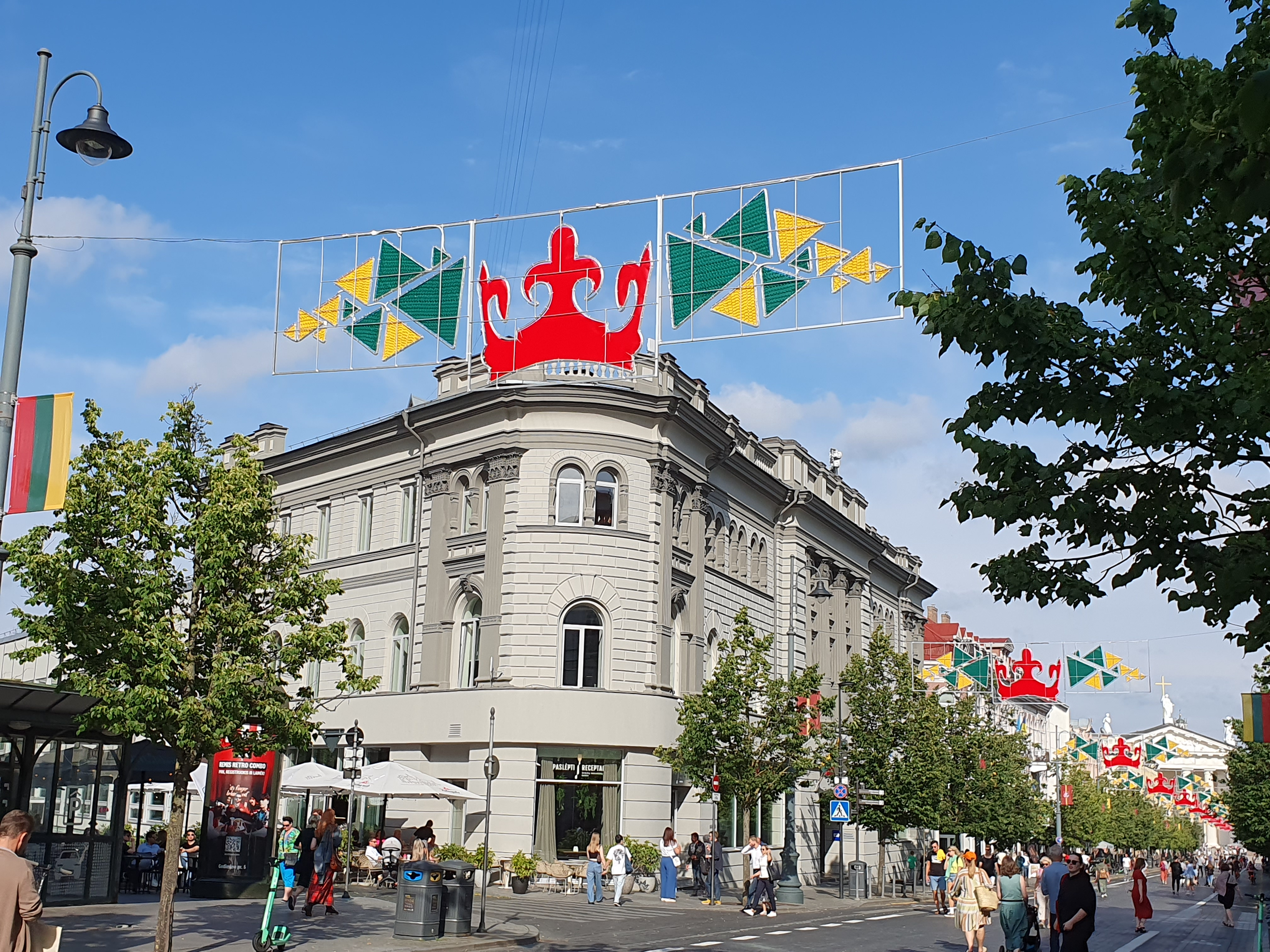
- Gediminas Avenue in Vilnius, decorated for the upcoming commemoration of the Statehood Day (6 July 2023)
- Observed by: Lithuania
- Significance: Commemorate the coronation in 1253 of Mindaugas as the first and only King of Lithuania
- Date: 6 July
- Next time: 6 July 2026
- Frequency: Annual

Statehood Day or Coronation Day is an annual public holiday in Lithuania celebrated on July 6 to commemorate the coronation in 1253 of Mindaugas as the King of Lithuania. The exact day of the event is disputable and was chosen according to the hypothesis of Edvardas Gudavičius, formulated in 1989. The day has officially been celebrated since 1991.

== Traditions ==
At 9 PM every year, Lithuanians all over the world are encouraged to sing the national anthem in the name of unity. The tradition has been around since 2009, when the anthem was sung to commemorate the millennium of the name of Lithuania.

== See also ==
- Statehood Day in other countries
