= Lithuania at the 2026 European Athletics Championships =

- Flag of Lithuania
- WA code: LTU

in Birmingham, United Kingdom 10–16 August 2026
- Competitors: 19 (9 men and 10 women)
- Medals: Gold 0 Silver 1 Bronze 0 Total 1

European Athletics Championships appearances
- 1934; 1938–1990; 1994; 1998; 2002; 2006; 2010; 2012; 2014; 2016; 2018; 2022; 2024; 2026

Other related appearances
- Soviet Union (1946–1990)

Lithuania competed at the 2026 European Athletics Championships in Birmingham, United Kingdom from 10–16 August 2026.

== Medallists ==
Medal	Name	Event	Date
Silver	Mykolas Alekna	Men's discus throw	13 August

== Results ==
Lithuania entered the following athletes.

Key

- Q = Qualified for the next round
- q = Qualified for the next round as a fastest loser or, in field events, by position without achieving the qualifying target
- NR = National record
- PB = Personal best
- SB = Season best
- N/A = Round not applicable for the event

=== Men ===
Track and road events

Athlete	Event	Heat		Semifinal		Final	
Athlete	Event	Result	Rank	Result	Rank	Result	Rank
Adas Dambrauskas	100 m	10.57	12 q	10.38	6	Did not advance	
Gediminas Truskauskas	200 m	20.72	6 q	20.75	8	Did not advance	
Simas Bertašius	5000 m	—N/a				13:36.22	17

Field events

Athlete	Event	Qualification		Final	
Athlete	Event	Distance	Position	Distance	Position
Juozas Baikštys	High jump	2.10	20	Did not advance	
Martynas Alekna	Discus throw	62.29	10 q	61.78	12
Mykolas Alekna	Discus throw	67.74	1 Q	69.89	2nd place, silver medalist(s)
Andrius Gudžius	Discus throw	62.54	9 q	63.99	9
Edis Matusevičius	Javelin throw	80.89	6 q		

Combined events – Decathlon

Athlete	Event	100 m	LJ	SP	HJ	400 m	110H	DT	PV	JT	1500 m	Final	Rank
Edgaras Benkunskas	Result	11.27	6.90	14.85	1.93	50.29 =SB	15.04	46.56	4.50	59.13	4:45.25 SB	7689	18
Edgaras Benkunskas	Points	801	790	780	740	801	845	799	760	725	648	7689	18

=== Women ===
Track and road events

Athlete	Event	Heat		Semifinal		Final	
Athlete	Event	Result	Rank	Result	Rank	Result	Rank
Lukrecija Sabaitytė	200 m	23.62	18	Did not advance			
Modesta Justė Morauskaitė	400 m	51.64 SB	5 q	51.72	7	Did not advance	
Gabija Galvydytė	800 m	1:58.99	1 Q	2:03.59	7 qR	1:59.12	4
Gabija Galvydytė	1500 m	4:10.87	7	—N/a		Did not advance	
Vaida Žūsinaitė	Marathon	—N/a					
Austėja Kavaliauskaitė	Half marathon race walk	—N/a				1:43:16	25

Field events

Athlete	Event	Qualification		Final	
Athlete	Event	Distance	Position	Distance	Position
Rugilė Miklyčiūtė	Pole vault	4.40	8 q	4.30	11
Dovilė Kilty	Triple jump	13.56	20	Did not advance	
Diana Zaiganova	Triple jump	12.67	27	Did not advance	
Ieva Gumbs	Discus throw	58.03	13	Did not advance	

Combined events – Heptathlon

Athlete	Event	100H	HJ	SP	200 m	LJ	JT	800 m	Final	Rank
Beatričė Juškevičiūtė	Result	13.09 SB	1.65	13.70	23.73	6.33 PB	47.10 SB			
Beatričė Juškevičiūtė	Points	1111	795	774	1007	953	804			
