= Lithuania at the 2022 European Championships =

in (Germany) Munich 11 August 2022 – 22 August 2022
- Competitors: 73 (47 men and 26 women) in 11 sports
- Medals Ranked 21st: Gold 2 Silver 2 Bronze 3 Total 7

European Championships appearances
- 2018; 2022

Lithuania competed at the 2022 European Championships in Munich from August 11 to August 22, 2022.

== Medallists ==
Medal	Name	Sport	Event	Date
Gold	Mykolas Alekna	Athletics	Men's discus throw	19 August
Gold	Henrikas Žustautas	Canoeing	Men's C–1 200 metres	20 August
Silver	Henrikas Žustautas; Vadim Korobov	Canoeing	Men's C–2 200 metres	21 August
Silver	Robert Tvorogal	Gymnastics	Men's horizontal bar	21 August
Bronze	Armandas Kelmelis; Dovydas Nemeravičius	Rowing	Men's double sculls	14 August
Bronze	Artūras Seja; Ignas Navakauskas	Canoeing	Men's K–2 200 metres	20 August
Bronze	Mindaugas Maldonis; Andrej Olijnik	Canoeing	Men's K–2 500 metres	21 August

== Competitors ==
The following is the list of number of competitors in the Championships:

Sport	Men	Women	Total
Athletics	9	10	19
Beach volleyball	0	4	4
Gymnastics (men and women)	5	1	6
Canoe sprint	10	1	11
Cycling mountain bike	1	0	1
Cycling road	4	2	6
Cycling track	4	1	5
Rowing	10	3	13
Sport climbing	1	0	1
Table tennis	2	3	5
Triathlon	1	1	2
Total	47	26	73

== Athletics ==
A delegation of 19 athletes was sent to represent the country.

=== Men's events ===
Track and road events

Athletes	Event	Heats		Semifinal		Final	
Athletes	Event	Result	Rank	Result	Rank	Result	Rank
Gediminas Truskauskas	200 m	20.67	6 Q	21.05	22	did not advance	
Simas Bertašius	1500 m	3:40:19	15	—		did not advance	
Ignas Brasevičius	Marathon	—				2:25:25	57
Remigijus Kančys	Marathon	—				DNF	-
Arturas Mastianica	35 km walk	—				2:46:09	17
Arturas Mastianica	20 km walk	—				1:25:54	16
Marius Žiūkas	20 km walk	—				1:24:58	12

Field events

Athletes	Event	Heats		Final	
Athletes	Event	Result	Rank	Result	Rank
Juozas Baikštys	High jump	2.17 m	14	did not advance	
Mykolas Alekna	Discus throw	65.48 m	4 q	69.78 m CR	1st place, gold medalist(s)
Andrius Gudžius	Discus throw	66.70 m	2 Q	65.40 m	6

=== Women's events ===
Track and road events

Athletes	Event	Heats		Semifinal		Final	
Athletes	Event	Result	Rank	Result	Rank	Result	Rank
Modesta Justė Morauskaitė	400 m	Bye		51.70	13	did not advance	
Gabija Galvydytė	800 m	2:03.92	24	did not advance			
Greta Karinauskaitė	3000 m steeplechase	9:55.11	18	—		did not advance	
Loreta Kančytė	Marathon	—				2:41:15	38

Field events

Athletes	Event	Heats		Final	
Athletes	Event	Result	Rank	Result	Rank
Urtė Baikštytė	High jump	1.78 m	19	did not advance	
Jogailė Petrokaitė	Long jump	6.37 m	14	did not advance	
Aina Grikšaitė	Triple jump	13.62	15	did not advance	
Dovilė Kilty	Triple jump	13.83	10 q	13.27 m	12
Ieva Zarankaitė	Discus throw	56.85 m	14	did not advance	
Liveta Jasiūnaitė	Javelin throw	61.85	1 Q	58.95 m	6

== Beach Volleyball ==
Lithuania has qualified 2 female pairs.

Athlete	Event	Preliminary round			Round of 24	Round of 16	Quarterfinals	Semifinals	Final / BM	
Athlete	Event	Opposition Score	Opposition Score	Rank	Opposition Score	Opposition Score	Opposition Score	Opposition Score	Opposition Score	Rank
Erika Kliokmanaitė; Monika Paulikienė	Women's	Soria – González (ESP); Walkenhorst – Lippmann (GER)	L 1-2 (49-55); L 1-2 (48-53)	4	Did not advance					
Ieva Dumbauskaitė; Gerda Grudzinskaitė	Women's	Stam – Schoon (NED); Davidova – Lunina (UKR)	L 1-2 (42-54); W 2-1 (56-54)	3 q	Menegatti – Gottardi (ITA); L 0-2 (34-42)	did not advance				

== Canoeing ==
Athlete	Event	Heats		Semifinals		Final		Overall rank
Athlete	Event	Time	Rank	Time	Rank	Time	Rank	Overall rank
Henrikas Žustautas	Men's C-1 200m	41.443	5 SF	40.164	2 FA	39.832	1	Gold
Andrius Jančiukovičius	Men's C-1 500m	1:56.293	3 SF	1:52.353	4 FB	1:53.591	3	12
Henrikas Žustautas; Vadim Korobov	Men's C-2 200m	Bye				37.595	=2	Silver
Henrikas Žustautas; Vadim Korobov	Men's C-2 500m	1:48.964	4 SF	1:40.464	1 FA	1:49.299	9	9
Viktor Čaplinskij	Men's K-1 500m	1:46.246	5 SF	1:48.399	9	did not advance		20
Andrej Olijnik	Men's K-1 1000m	3:40.065	5 SF	3:36.714	4 FB	3:37.054	1	10
Ričardas Nekriošius	Men's K-1 5000m	Bye				KO	10	
Artūras Seja; Ignas Navakauskas	Men's K-2 200m	31.710	1 F	Bye		31.678	3	Bronze
Mindaugas Maldonis; Andrej Olijnik	Men's K-2 500m	1:35.045	2 SF	1:30.314	1 FA	1:32.210	3	Bronze
Simonas Maldonis; Mindaugas Maldonis; Ignas Navakauskas; Artūras Seja	Men's K-4 500m	1:20.722	1 F	Bye		1:21.121	6	6
Gabrielė Čerepokaitė	Women's C-1 200m	50.779	6 SF	50.698	7	did not advance		13

== Cycling ==
=== Track Cycling ===
Sprint

Athlete	Event	Qualification		Round 1	Round 2	Quarterfinals	Semifinals	Final	
Athlete	Event	Time Speed (km/h)	Rank	Opposition Time Speed (km/h)	Opposition Time Speed (km/h)	Opposition Time Speed (km/h)	Opposition Time Speed (km/h)	Opposition Time Speed (km/h)	Rank
Vasilijus Lendel	Men's sprint	9.870	9 Q	Bye	(Hungary) Szalontay; L	Did not advance			
Svajūnas Jonauskas	Men's sprint	10.035	15 q	(Ukraine) Denysenk; W 10.750; 66.976	(Poland) Rudyk; L	Did not advance			

Team sprint

Athlete	Event	Qualification		Semifinals		Final	
Athlete	Event	Time Speed (km/h)	Rank	Opposition Time Speed (km/h)	Rank	Opposition Time Speed (km/h)	Rank
Vasilijus Lendel; Svajūnas Jonauskas; Laurynas Vinskas	Men's team sprint	36.928	9	Did not advance			

Qualification legend: FA=Gold medal final; FB=Bronze medal final

Keirin

Athlete	Event	1st Round	Repechage	Semifinals	Final
Athlete	Event	Rank	Rank	Rank	Rank
Vasilijus Lendel	Men's keirin	3 R	REL	Did not advance	
Svajūnas Jonauskas	Men's keirin	2 R	2 SF	4	9

Omnium

Athlete	Event	Scratch race		Tempo race		Elimination race		Points race		Total points	Rank
Athlete	Event	Rank	Points	Rank	Points	Rank	Points	Points	Rank	Total points	Rank
Olivija Baleišytė	Women's omnium	14	14	-20	17	42	11	-19	16	23	16

Individual events

Athlete	Event	Result	Rank
Olivija Baleišytė	Women's scratch	17	17
Olivija Baleišytė	Women's elimination race	6	6
Justas Beniušis	Men's time trial	1:02.905	14

=== Road Cycling ===
Athlete	Event	Time	Rank
Ignatas Konovalovas	Men's Road Race	4:39:07	54
Venantas Lašinis	Men's Road Race	4:46:07	124
Mantas Januškevičius	Men's Road Race	DNF	-
Evaldas Šiškevičius	Men's Road Race	4:42:20	112
Evaldas Šiškevičius	Men's Time Trial	+2:17.00	24
Rasa Leleivytė	Women's road race	2:59:20	12
Inga Češulienė	Women's road race	2:59:36	40
Inga Češulienė	Women's Time Trial	+4:37.75	26

=== MTB Cycling ===
Athlete	Event	Time	Rank
Ignas Ambrazas	Men's Olympic cross	-2LAP	51

== Gymnastics ==
Lithuania has entered five male and one female athletes.

=== Men ===
Qualification

Athlete	Event	Qualification								Final							
Athlete	Event	Apparatus						Total	Rank	Apparatus						Total	Rank
Athlete	Event	F	PH	R	V	PB	HB	Total	Rank	F	PH	R	V	PB	HB	Total	Rank
Gytis Chasažyrovas	Team	13.100	13.633	11.000	13.066	13.300	12.300	76.399	46	did not advance						—	
Titas Kuzmickas	Team	12.400	4.200	11.366	9.833	12.466	11.133	61.398	74	did not advance						—	
Tomas Kuzmickas	Team	13.133	12.200	12.266	13.066	13.333	12.966	76.964	43	did not advance						—	
Ernestas Liaškinas	Team	10.700	10.733		12.633			did not advance								—	
Robert Tvorogal	Team					11.366	13.966 Q	did not advance							14.000; Silver	—	
Total	Team	38.633	36.566	34.632	38.765	39.099	39.232	226.927	22	did not advance							

=== Women ===
Qualification

Athlete	Qualification					
Athlete	Apparatus				Total	Rank
Athlete	V	UB	BB	F	Total	Rank
Ūla Bikinaitė	12.400	9.100	11.633	9.566	42.699	74

== Rowing ==
Athlete	Event	Heats		Repechage		Semifinals		Final		Overall rank
Athlete	Event	Time	Rank	Time	Rank	Time	Rank	Time	Rank	Overall rank
Dovydas Nemeravičius; Armandas Kelmelis	M2x	6:52.00	1 SA/B	Bye		6:38.33	3 FA	6:42.11	3	Bronze
Žygimantas Gališanskis; Dominykas Jančionis; Giedrius Bieliauskas; Aurimas Adomavičius	M4x	6:29.95	3 SA/B	Bye		6:28.33	5 FB	5:55.76	1	7
Dovydas Stankūnas; Domantas Stankūnas	M2-	7:07.47	2 SA/B	Bye		7:07.11	3 FA	6:51.84	4	4
Viktorija Senkutė	W1x	9:17.95	4 R	8:41.65	3 SA/B	8:28.94	5 FB	8:32.93	4	10
Dovilė Rimkutė; Donata Karalienė	W2x	7:39.18	1 SA/B	Bye		7:19.98	2 FA	7:29.10	4	4

== Sport climbing ==
Athlete	Event	Qualification		Final	
Athlete	Event	Result	Rank	Result	Rank
Kipras Gabrielius Baltrūnas	Men's Boulder	1T2z 4 8	46	Did not advance	
Men's Lead	44.72	47	Did not advance		

== Table tennis ==
Singles

Athlete	Event	Qualification	Round of 64	Round of 32	Round of 16	Quarterfinals	Semifinals	Repechage	Final / BM
Athlete	Event	Result	Opposition Result	Opposition Result	Opposition Result	Opposition Result	Opposition Result	Opposition Result	Rank
Emilija Riliškytė	Women's singles	0 W/ 2L	did not advance						
Kornelija Riliškytė	Women's singles	0 W/ 2L	did not advance						
Eglė Jankauskienė	Women's singles	0 W/ 2L	did not advance						
Ignas Navickas	Men's singles	0 W/ 3L	did not advance						
Kęstutis Žeimys	Men's singles	1 W/ 2L	did not advance						

Doubles

Athlete	Event	Round of 64	Round of 32	Round of 16	Quarterfinals	Semifinals	Repechage	Final / BM
Athlete	Event	Opposition Result	Opposition Result	Opposition Result	Opposition Result	Opposition Result	Opposition Result	Rank
Ignas Navickas; Emilija Riliškytė	Mixed Doubles	(Cyprus) Yiangou/Meletie; L 0-3	did not advance					
Kęstutis Žeimys; Kornelija Riliškytė	Mixed Doubles	(Bulgaria) Krastev/Yovkova; L 0-3	did not advance					
Emilija Riliškytė; Kornelija Riliškytė	Women's Doubles	Bye	(Serbia) Todorovic/Surjan; L 1-3	did not advance				
Ignas Navickas; Kęstutis Žeimys	Men's Doubles	Bye	(Turkey) Yigenler/Gunduz; L 0-3	did not advance				

== Triathlon ==
Athlete	Event	Swim (1.5 km)	Trans 1	Bike (40 km)	Trans 2	Run (10 km)	Total Time	Rank
Igor Kozlovskij	Men's	19:04; 59	19:40; 59	LAP	Lapped			
Inga Paplauskė	Women's	23:13; 55	23:53; 55	LAP	Lapped			
