= Lithuania at the World Athletics Championships =

Sporting event delegation

- Flag of Lithuania
- WA code: LTU
- Medals: Gold 3 Silver 5 Bronze 5 Total 13

World Athletics Championships appearances (overview)
- 1993; 1995; 1997; 1999; 2001; 2003; 2005; 2007; 2009; 2011; 2013; 2015; 2017; 2019; 2022; 2023; 2025

Lithuania officially has competed at the World Athletics Championships since 1993.

== Medals table ==
Medal	Name	Games	Event
Gold	Virgilijus Alekna	2003 Outdoor	Men's discus throw
Gold	Virgilijus Alekna	2005 Outdoor	Men's discus throw
Gold	Andrius Gudžius	2017 Outdoor	Men's discus throw
Silver	Ana Ambrazienė	1983 Outdoor	Women's 400 m hurdles
Silver	Galina Murašova	1983 Outdoor	Women's discus throw
Silver	Virgilijus Alekna	1997 Outdoor	Men's discus throw
Silver	Virgilijus Alekna	2001 Outdoor	Men's discus throw
Silver	Mykolas Alekna	2022 Outdoor	Men's discus throw
Bronze	Nijolė Medvedeva	1985 Indoor	Women's long jump
Bronze	Austra Skujytė	2003 Indoor	Women's pentathlon
Bronze	Remigija Nazarovienė	1997 Outdoor	Women's heptathlon
Bronze	Mykolas Alekna	2023 Outdoor	Men's discus throw
Bronze	Andrius Gudžius	2022 Outdoor	Men's discus throw

== IAAF World Championships in Athletics ==
=== IAAF World Indoor Championships in Athletics ===
Year	Athletes	Country	Best place	Best athlete	Best performance
1985	1	Lithuanian SSR	Bronze	Nijolė Medvedeva	6,44 m (long jump)
1993	6	Lithuania	7th	Dalia Matusevičienė	2:02.12 (800 m)
1995	2	Lithuania	13th	Saulius Kleiza	18,41 m (shot put)
1997	3	Lithuania	6th	Nelė Žilinskienė	1,95 m (high jump)
1999	3	Lithuania	4th	Remigija Nazarovienė	4505 pts (pentathlon)
2001	1	Lithuania	14th	Žana Minina	53,68 (400 m)
2003	1	Lithuania	16th	Agnė Visockaitė	7,31 (60 m)
2004	2	Lithuania	Bronze	Austra Skujytė	4679 pts (pentathlon)
2006	2	Lithuania	10th	Irina Krakoviak	4:14.27 (1500 m)
2008	2	Lithuania	5th	Austra Skujytė	4655 (pentathlon)
2010	5	Lithuania	5th	Eglė Balčiūnaitė	2:01.37 (800 m)

== IAAF World Cup in Athletics ==
Year	Athletes	Country	Best place	Best athlete	Best performance
1983	2	Lithuanian SSR	Silver	Ana Ambrazienė	54.15 (400 m hurdles)
1983	2	Lithuanian SSR	Silver	Galina Murašova	67.44 m (discus throw)
1987	3	Lithuanian SSR	6th	Ana Ambrazienė	55.68 (400 m hurdles)
1987	3	Lithuanian SSR	6th	Romas Ubartas	65.50 m (discus throw)
1993	9	Lithuania	11th	Vaclavas Kidykas	58.62 (discus throw)
1995	10	Lithuania	8th	Nelė Žilinskienė	1.93 (high jump)
1997	7	Lithuania	Silver	Virgilijus Alekna	66.70 (discus throw)
1999	12	Lithuania	4th	Virgilijus Alekna	67.53 (discus throw)
2001	13	Lithuania	Silver	Virgilijus Alekna	69.40 (discus throw)
2003	7	Lithuania	Gold	Virgilijus Alekna	69.69 (discus throw)
2005	9	Lithuania	Gold	Virgilijus Alekna	70.17 (discus throw)
2007	6	Lithuania	4th	Virgilijus Alekna	65.24 (discus throw)
2009	16	Lithuania	4th	Virgilijus Alekna	66.36 (discus throw)

== IAAF World Junior Championships in Athletics ==
Medals:

Medal	Name	Games	Event
Gold	Andrius Gudžius	2010	Men's discus throw
Silver	Viktorija Žemaitytė	2004	Women's heptathlon
Silver	Airinė Palšytė	2010	Women's high jump

== IAAF World Youth Championships in Athletics ==
Medals:

Medal	Name	Games	Event
Bronze	Andrius Gudžius	2007	Men's discus throw

== IAAF World Half Marathon Championships ==
Živilė Balčiūnaitė set best Lithuania's performance in IAAF World Half Marathon Championships by reaching 17th place.

== See also ==
- Lithuania at the Olympics
