= Lithuania at the 2025 World Athletics Championships =

- Flag of Lithuania
- WA code: LTU

in Tokyo, Japan 13 September 2025 – 21 September 2025
- Competitors: 11 (6 men and 5 women)
- Medals Ranked 27th: Gold 0 Silver 1 Bronze 0 Total 1

World Athletics Championships appearances (overview)
- 1993; 1995; 1997; 1999; 2001; 2003; 2005; 2007; 2009; 2011; 2013; 2015; 2017; 2019; 2022; 2023; 2025

Lithuania competed at the 2025 World Athletics Championships in Tokyo, Japan, from 13 to 21 September 2025.

== Medallists ==
Medal	Athlete	Event	Date
Silver	Mykolas Alekna	Men's discus throw	September 21

== Results ==
Lithuania entered 11 athletes to the championships: 5 women and 6 men.

Key

- Q = Qualified for the next round
- q = Qualified for the next round as a fastest loser or, in field events, by position without achieving the qualifying target
- NR = National record
- PB = Personal best
- SB = Season best
- N/A = Round not applicable for the event

=== Men ===
Track and road events

Athlete	Event	Heat		Semifinal		Final	
Athlete	Event	Result	Rank	Result	Rank	Result	Rank
Gediminas Truskauskas	200 metres	20.95	8	Did not advance			

Field events

Athlete	Event	Qualification		Final	
Athlete	Event	Distance	Position	Distance	Position
Juozas Baikštys	High jump	2.16	22	Did not advance	
Martynas Alekna	Discus throw	67.16 SB	3 Q	63.34	7
Mykolas Alekna	Discus throw	65.39	8 q	67.84	2nd place, silver medalist(s)
Andrius Gudžius	Discus throw	65.18	9 q	63.43	6
Edis Matusevičius	Javelin throw	82.78	13	Did not advance	

=== Women ===
Track and road events

Athlete	Event	Heat		Semifinal		Final	
Athlete	Event	Result	Rank	Result	Rank	Result	Rank
Gabija Galvydytė	800 metres	1:58.86	2 Q	1:57.96 PB	8	Did not advance	
Gabija Galvydytė	1500 metres	4:02.81	5 Q	4:01.79	8	Did not advance	

Field events

Athlete	Event	Qualification		Final	
Athlete	Event	Distance	Position	Distance	Position
Dovilė Kilty	Triple jump	13.86	13	Did not advance	
Ieva Gumbs	Discus throw	58.97	22	Did not advance	
Liveta Jasiūnaitė	Javelin throw	58.66	20	Did not advance	

Combined events – Heptathlon

Athlete	Event	100H	HJ	SP	200 m	LJ	JT	800 m	Final	Rank
Beatrice Juškevičiūtė	Result	13.03	1.62 m	14.17 m	23.80	5.76 m	46.66 m	2:14.90	6151	14
Beatrice Juškevičiūtė	Points	1120	759	805	1000	777	796	894	6151	14
