= Lithuania at the 2022 European Athletics Championships =

- WA code: LTU
- National federation: Athletics Federation of Lithuania
- Website: lengvoji.lt

in Munich
- Competitors: 19 (9 men and 10 women) in 16 events
- Medals Ranked 19th: Gold 1 Silver 0 Bronze 0 Total 1

European Athletics Championships appearances
- 1934; 1938–1990; 1994; 1998; 2002; 2006; 2010; 2012; 2014; 2016; 2018; 2022; 2024

Other related appearances
- Soviet Union (1946–1990)

Lithuania competed at the 2022 European Athletics Championships in Munich, Germany, between 15 and 21 August 2022.

== Medalists ==
Medal	Name	Event	Date
Gold	Mykolas Alekna	Men's discus throw	19 August

== Results ==
A delegation of 19 athletes was sent to represent the country.

=== Men's events ===
Track and road events

Athletes	Event	Heats		Semifinal		Final	
Athletes	Event	Result	Rank	Result	Rank	Result	Rank
Gediminas Truskauskas	200 m	20.67	6 Q	21.05	22	did not advance	
Simas Bertašius	1500 m	3:40:19	15	—		did not advance	
Ignas Brasevičius	Marathon	—				2:25:25	57
Remigijus Kančys	Marathon	—				DNF	-
Arturas Mastianica	35 km walk	—				2:46:09	17
Arturas Mastianica	20 km walk	—				1:25:54	16
Marius Žiūkas	20 km walk	—				1:24:58	12

Field events

Athletes	Event	Heats		Final	
Athletes	Event	Result	Rank	Result	Rank
Juozas Baikštys	High jump	2.17 m	14	did not advance	
Mykolas Alekna	Discus throw	65.48 m	4 q	69.78 m CR	1st place, gold medalist(s)
Andrius Gudžius	Discus throw	66.70 m	2 Q	65.40 m	6

=== Women's events ===
Track and road events

Athletes	Event	Heats		Semifinal		Final	
Athletes	Event	Result	Rank	Result	Rank	Result	Rank
Modesta Justė Morauskaitė	400 m	Bye		51.70	13	did not advance	
Gabija Galvydytė	800 m	2:03.92	24	did not advance			
Greta Karinauskaitė	3000 m steeplechase	9:55.11	18	—		did not advance	
Loreta Kančytė	Marathon	—				2:41:15	38

Field events

Athletes	Event	Heats		Final	
Athletes	Event	Result	Rank	Result	Rank
Urtė Baikštytė	High jump	1.78 m	19	did not advance	
Jogailė Petrokaitė	Long jump	6.37 m	14	did not advance	
Aina Grikšaitė	Triple jump	13.62	15	did not advance	
Dovilė Kilty	Triple jump	13.83	10 q	13.27 m	12
Ieva Zarankaitė	Discus throw	56.85 m	14	did not advance	
Liveta Jasiūnaitė	Javelin throw	61.85	1 Q	58.95 m	6
