= 2022 Lithuanian Athletics Championships =

- Edition: 99th
- Dates: 25–26 June
- Host city: Šiauliai, Lithuania
- Level: Senior
- Type: Outdoor

The 2022 Lithuanian Athletics Championships was the 99th edition of the national championship in outdoor track and field for athletes in Lithuania. It was held between 25 and 26 June in Šiauliai. Heptathlon and decathlon was held between 10 and 11 May in Šiauliai. 20 kilometres walk was held in 20 May in Alytus.

== Results ==
=== Men ===
| Event | Gold | | Silver | | Bronze | |
|---|---|---|---|---|---|---|
| 100 metres | Gediminas Truskauskas | 10.53 | Kostas Skrabulis | 10.89 | Dovydas Jocius | 10.89 |
| 200 metres | Gediminas Truskauskas | 20.62 | Tomas Keršulis | 20.90 | Dariuš Križanovskij | 21.68 |
| 400 metres | Tomas Keršulis | 46.45 | Lukas Sutkus | 47.57 | Dariuš Križanovskij | 48.05 |
| 800 metres | Simas Bertašius | 1:51.03 | Benediktas Mickus | 1:51.57 | Arnas Gabrėnas | 1:51.60 |
| 1500 metres | Simas Bertašius | 3:48.69 | Arnas Gabrėnas | 3:50.82 | Eduardas Rimas Survilas | 3:58.34 |
| 5000 metres | Giedrius Valinčius | 14:53.59 | Lukas Tarasevičius | 15:32.70 | Paulius Auryla | 15:35.63 |
| 10,000 metres | Justinas Beržanskis | 31:39.32 | Jaunius Strazdas | 32:02.61 | Evaldas Gustaitis | 32:06.56 |
| 110 metres hurdles | Edgaras Benkunskas | 14.52 | Domas Gailevičius | 14.88 | Matas Vilinauskas | 15.93 |
| 400 metres hurdles | Rapolas Saulius | 53.04 | Lukas Šermukšnis | 55.55 | Domas Gailevičius | 55.81 |
| 3000 metres steeplechase | Giedrius Valinčius | 9:07.66 | Airidas Bendaravičius | 10:02.49 | Matas Baura | 10:37.95 |
| 4 × 100 metres relay | Tomas Sabašinskas; Edgaras Benkunskas; Domantas Dobrega; Kristupas Seikauskas | 41.59 | Lukas Šermukšnis; Einius Trumpa; Domas Gailevičius; Nedas Talalas | 41.91 | Dangiras Grušas; Dominykas Urbonas; Nojus Navickas; Airidas Zabaras | 43.57 |
| High jump | Juozas Baikštys | 2.20 | Mantas Liekis | 2.15 | Adrijus Glebauskas | 2.15 |
| Pole vault | Osvaldas Gedrimas | 4.90 | Lukas Kolpakovas | 4.60 | Nikodemas Laurynas | 4.60 |
| Long jump | Marius Vadeikis | 7.53 | Artūras Raklevičius | 7.49 | Tomas Lotužis | 7.47 |
| Triple jump | Marius Vadeikis | 15.46 | Gustas Griška | 15.18 | Ernestas Šostakas | 14.13 |
| Shot put | Šarūnas Banevičius | 17.54 | Vytenis Ivaškevičius | 17.42 | Simonas Bakanas | 16.82 |
| Discus throw | Mykolas Alekna | 69.00 | Andrius Gudžius | 65.21 | Aleksas Abromavičius | 59.93 |
| Hammer throw | Tomas Vasiliauskas | 67.97 | Tomas Juknevičius | 54.69 | Gintautas Misevičius | 52.34 |
| Javelin throw | Tomas Sabašinskas | 70.11 | Skirmantas Šimoliūnas | 69.50 | Marius Rudzevičius | 60.98 |
| Decathlon | Edgaras Benkunskas | 7892 | Tomas Sabašinskas | 7560 | Only two participants | |
| 20 kilometres walk | Marius Žiūkas | 1:25:48 | Artur Mastianica | 1:29:22 | Only two participants | |

=== Women ===
| Event | Gold | | Silver | | Bronze | |
|---|---|---|---|---|---|---|
| 100 metres | Eva Misiūnaitė | 12.00 | Lukrecija Sabaitytė | 12.05 | Karolina Deliautaitė | 12.10 |
| 200 metres | Modesta Justė Morauskaitė | 23.26 | Lukrecija Sabaitytė | 23.67 | Eva Misiūnaitė | 23.91 |
| 400 metres | Agnė Šerkšnienė | 54.66 | Ema Sarafinaitė | 55.95 | Roberta Žikaitė | 58.13 |
| 800 metres | Gabija Galvydytė | 2:04.11 | Eglė Vaitulevičiūtė | 2:12.38 | Karolina Mockaitytė | 2:12.68 |
| 1500 metres | Vytautė Budavičienė | 4:24.87 | Eglė Vaitulevičiūtė | 4:26.39 | Andra Tamašauskaitė | 4:32.06 |
| 5000 metres | Lina Kiriliuk | 16:55.45 | Vytautė Budavičienė | 17:33.72 | Karolina Bliujūtė | 17:59.08 |
| 10,000 metres | Vaida Žūsinaitė-Nekrošienė | 36:13.31 | Diana Banienė | 36:49.14 | Not awarded | |
| 100 metres hurdles | Gabija Klimukaitė | 14.28 | Neda Lasickaitė | 14.56 | Olivija Vaitaitytė | 14.81 |
| 400 metres hurdles | Ema Sarafinaitė | 1:00.63 | Gerda Kirkytė | 1:00.73 | Hanna Zikejeva | 1:02.83 |
| 3000 metres steeplechase | Greta Karinauskaitė | 9:50.26 | Regvita Gackaitė | 11:34.10 | Not awarded | |
| 4 × 100 metres relay | Airūnė Čegytė; Marija Fausta Rimkevičiūtė; Gerda Kirkytė; Ema Rupšytė | 47.27 | Karolina Talalaitė; Aistė Unskinaitė; Greta Zalatoriūtė; Andrė Ožechauskaitė | 47.35 | Evelina Savickaitė; Austė Macijauskaitė; Urtė Kščenavičiūtė; Akvilė Jonauskytė | 47.50 |
| High jump | Airinė Palšytė | 1.89 | Urtė Baikštytė | 1.86 | Viltė Stašaitytė | 1.75 |
| Pole vault | Rugilė Miklyčiūtė | 4.10 NR | Elzė Kudulytė | 3.50 | Kamilė Petrauskaitė | 3.40 |
| Long jump | Jogailė Petrokaitė | 6.76 | Luka Garšvaitė | 6.12 | Eivilė Cemnolonskytė | 5.97 |
| Triple jump | Aina Grikšaitė | 13.98 | Dovilė Kilty | 13.74 | Diana Zagainova | 13.67 |
| Shot put | Ieva Zarankaitė | 16.83 | Urtė Bačianskaitė | 14.39 | Eglė Zarankaitė | 12.85 |
| Discus throw | Ieva Zarankaitė | 59.42 | Paulina Stuglytė | 48.90 | Eglė Zarankaitė | 48.73 |
| Hammer throw | Agnė Lukoševičiūtė | 62.44 | Natalija Gudauskienė | 46.13 | Mairita Pajedaitė | 44.47 |
| Javelin throw | Liveta Jasiūnaitė | 58.43 | Indrė Jakubaitytė | 53.18 | Kamilė Kunickaitė | 43.90 |
| Heptathlon | Miglė Mincytė | 3640 | Greta Taraškevičiūtė | 3601 | Ksavera Kochanova | 3255 |
| 20 kilometres walk | Brigita Virbalytė-Dimšienė | 1:37:37 | Austėja Kavaliauskaitė | 1:37:51 | Adrija Meškauskaitė | 1:41:54 |
