= Lithuania at the 2018 European Athletics Championships =

- WA code: LTU
- National federation: LAF
- Website: lengvoji.lt

in Berlin
- Competitors: 27
- Medals: Gold 1 Silver 0 Bronze 1 Total 2

European Athletics Championships appearances
- 1934; 1938–1990; 1994; 1998; 2002; 2006; 2010; 2012; 2014; 2016; 2018; 2022; 2024

Other related appearances
- Soviet Union (1946–1990)

Lithuania competed at the 2018 European Athletics Championships in Berlin, Germany, from 6–12 August 2018. A delegation of 27 athletes were sent to represent the country.

== Medalists ==
Medal	Name	Event	Date
Gold	Andrius Gudžius	Men's Discus throw	8 August
Bronze	Liveta Jasiūnaitė	Women's Javelin throw	10 August

== Results ==
The following athletes have been selected to compete by the Lithuanian Athletics Association.

Men
Track and road

Athletes	Event	Heats		Semifinal		Final	
Athletes	Event	Result	Rank	Result	Rank	Result	Rank
Gediminas Truskauskas	200 metres	21.11	5	did not advance			
Simas Bertašius	1500 metres	3:40.95	4 q	—		3:39.04	6
Ignas Brasevicius	Marathon	—				2:20:20	40
Valdas Dopolskas	Marathon	—				2:18:12	20
Remigijus Kančys	Marathon	—				2:18:59	26
Mindaugas Viršilas	Marathon	—				2:27:47	55
Justinas Beržanskis	3000 metres steeplechase	8:36.88 PB	10	—		did not advance	
Artur Mastianica	50 km walk	—				3:58:29 PB	14
Tadas Šuškevičius	50 km walk	—				4:01:30	17

Field events

Athletes	Event	Qualification		Final	
Athletes	Event	Distance	Position	Distance	Position
Adrijus Glebauskas	High jump	2.16	=20	did not advance	
Andrius Gudžius	Discus throw	64.30	4 Q	68.46	1st place, gold medalist(s)
Edis Matusevičius	Javelin throw	81.08	8 q	77.64	10

Women
Track and road

Athletes	Event	Heats		Semifinal		Final	
Athletes	Event	Result	Rank	Result	Rank	Result	Rank
Karolina Deliautaitė	100 metres	11.75	9	did not advance			
Eva Misiūnaitė	400 metres	54.02	8	did not advance			
Modesta Morauskaitė	400 metres	52.68	6	did not advance			
Agnė Šerkšnienė	400 metres	—		51.41	2 Q	51.42	6
Eglė Balčiūnaitė	800 metres	2:02.18 SB	6 q	2:04.60	7	did not advance	
Milda Eimontė	Marathon	—				2:38:58	27
Vaida Žūsinaitė	Marathon	—				2:50:49	43
Gabija Galvydytė; Erika Krūminaitė; Eva Misiūnaitė; Modesta Morauskaitė	4 × 400 metres relay	3:37.73	7	—		did not advance	
Živilė Vaiciukevičiūtė	20 km walk	—				1:28:07	5 (NU23R)
Brigita Virbalytė-Dimšienė	20 km walk	—				1:27:59	4 (NR)

Field events

Athletes	Event	Qualification		Final	
Athletes	Event	Distance	Position	Distance	Position
Airinė Palšytė	High jump	1.90	=1 q	1.96 SB	4
Dovilė Dzindzaletaitė	Triple jump	13.75	23	did not advance	
Ieva Zarankaitė	Shot put	15.13	23	did not advance	
Ieva Zarankaitė	Discus throw	53.91	23	did not advance	
Liveta Jasiūnaitė	Javelin throw	61.61 =PB	3 Q	61.59	3rd place, bronze medalist(s)
