= Lithuania at the 2023 World Athletics Championships =

- Flag of Lithuania
- WA code: LTU

in Budapest, Hungary 19 August 2023 – 27 August 2023
- Competitors: 16 (6 men and 10 women)
- Medals Ranked 39th: Gold 0 Silver 0 Bronze 1 Total 1

World Athletics Championships appearances (overview)
- 1993; 1995; 1997; 1999; 2001; 2003; 2005; 2007; 2009; 2011; 2013; 2015; 2017; 2019; 2022; 2023

Lithuania competed at the 2023 World Athletics Championships in Budapest, Hungary, from 19 to 27 August 2023.

== Medalists ==
The following competitors from Lithuania won medals at the Championships:

Medal	Athlete	Event	Date
Bronze	Mykolas Alekna	Discus throw	21 August

== Results ==
Lithuania entered 16 athletes.

Key

- Q = Qualified for the next round
- q = Qualified for the next round as a fastest loser or, in field events, by position without achieving the qualifying target
- NR = National record
- PB = Personal best
- SB = Season best
- N/A = Round not applicable for the event

=== Men ===
Track and road events

Athlete	Event	Heat		Semifinal		Final	
Athlete	Event	Result	Rank	Result	Rank	Result	Rank
Gediminas Truskauskas	200 metres	20.90	7	Did not advance			
Marius Žiūkas	20 kilometres walk	—				DQ	

Field events

Athlete	Event	Qualification		Final	
Athlete	Event	Distance	Position	Distance	Position
Martynas Alekna	Discus throw	62.57	20	Did not advance	
Mykolas Alekna	Discus throw	66.04	2 q	68.85	3rd place, bronze medalist(s)
Andrius Gudžius	Discus throw	65.50	6 q	66.16	6
Edis Matusevičius	Javelin throw	82.35	5 q	82.29	8

=== Women ===
Track and road events

Athlete	Event	Heat		Semifinal		Final	
Athlete	Event	Result	Rank	Result	Rank	Result	Rank
Modesta Justė Morauskaitė	400 metres	51.06 SB	5 q	52.15	8	Did not advance	
Gabija Galvydytė	800 metres	2:00.79	4	Did not advance			
Greta Karinauskaitė	3000 metres steeplechase	9:30.28	6	—		Did not advance	
Loreta Kančytė	Marathon	—				2:38:52	46
Austėja Kavaliauskaitė	35 kilometres walk	—				3:08:11	33

Field events

Athlete	Event	Qualification		Final	
Athlete	Event	Distance	Position	Distance	Position
Airinė Palšytė	High jump	1.85	=20	Did not advance	
Aina Grikšaitė	Triple jump	13.36	33	Did not advance	
Dovilė Kilty	Triple jump	13.87	20	Did not advance	
Ieva Zarankaitė	Discus throw	59.98	14	Did not advance	
Liveta Jasiūnaitė	Javelin throw	59.00	14	Did not advance	
