= Lithuania at the 2017 World Championships in Athletics =

- WA code: LTU
- National federation: Lietuvos lengvosios atletikos federacija
- Website: www.lengvoji.lt

in Beijing
- Competitors: 15
- Medals Ranked =23rd: Gold 1 Silver 0 Bronze 0 Total 1

World Championships in Athletics appearances
- 1993; 1995; 1997; 1999; 2001; 2003; 2005; 2007; 2009; 2011; 2013; 2015; 2017; 2019; 2022; 2023; 2025

Lithuania competed at the 2017 World Championships in Athletics in London, United Kingdom, from 4 to 13 August 2017.

== Medalists ==
The following competitor from Lithuania won medals at the Championships:

Medal	Athlete	Event	Date
Gold	Andrius Gudžius	Discus throw	5 August

== Results ==
(q – qualified, NM – no mark, SB – season best)

=== Men ===
Track and road events

Athlete	Event	Final	
Athlete	Event	Result	Rank
Remigijus Kančys	Marathon	2:16:34	24
Ignas Brasevičius	Marathon	2:22:20 SB	51
Marius Žiūkas	20 kilometres walk	1:22:38	29
Arturas Mastianica	50 kilometres walk	DNF	–

Field events

Athlete	Event	Qualification		Final	
Athlete	Event	Distance	Position	Distance	Position
Andrius Gudžius	Discus throw	67.01	2 Q	69.21 PB	1st place, gold medalist(s)
Edis Matusevičius	Javelin throw	NM	–	Did not advance	

=== Women ===
Track and road events

Athlete	Event	Heat		Semifinal		Final	
Athlete	Event	Result	Rank	Result	Rank	Result	Rank
Eglė Balčiūnaitė	800 metres	2:01.21 SB	12 Q	2:00.48 SB	13	Did not advance	
Vaida Žūsinaitė	Marathon	—N/a				2:41:44 SB	45
Monika Vaiciukevičiūtė	20 kilometres walk	—N/a				1:38:08	45
Živilė Vaiciukevičiūtė	20 kilometres walk	—N/a				1:31:23 PB	19
Brigita Virbalytė-Dimšienė	20 kilometres walk	—N/a				1:30:45 SB	16

Field events

Athlete	Event	Qualification		Final	
Athlete	Event	Distance	Position	Distance	Position
Airinė Palšytė	High jump	1.92	=6 q	1.92	=7
Dovilė Dzindzaletaitė	Triple jump	13.97	15	Did not advance	
Zinaida Sendriūtė	Discus throw	61.48 SB	12 q	NM	–
Liveta Jasiūnaitė	Javelin throw	55.80	26	Did not advance	

== Sources ==
- Lithuanian team
