= 2020 Lithuanian Athletics Championships =

2020 Lithuanian Athletics Championships at the
- Venue: Palanga Stadium
- Location: Palanga, Lithuania
- Date: August 7–8
- Competitors: 336

The 97th 2020 Lithuanian Athletics Championships were held in Palanga Stadium, Palanga on 7–8 August 2020. For the first time Lithuanian Championships was open for disabled par-athletes as well. Lithuania become third country in the world and first in Europe were par-athletes competed together with other athletes.

== Men's results ==
=== Track events ===
Event	Gold		Silver		Bronze	
100 m (+1.7 m/s)	Gediminas Truskauskas	10.37 PB	Ugnius Savickas	10.60	Giedrius Rupeika	10.76
200 m (+2.0 m/s)	Gediminas Truskauskas	20.83 CR NU23	Ugnius Savickas	21.30 PB	Daniel Golovacki	22.02 PB
400 m	Benediktas Mickus	47.88 PB	Dariuš Križanovskij	48.48	Daniel Golovacki	48.85
800 m	Benediktas Mickus	1:50.99	Arnas Gabrėnas	1:53.76	Justinas Laurinaitis	1:53.90
1500 m	Simas Bertašius	3:40.34	Giedrius Valinčius	3:51.57 PB	Lukas Tarasevičius	3:59.83
5000 m	Simas Bertašius	14:21.65	Ignas Brasevičius	14:49.41 PB	Egidijus Adomkaitis	14:54.84
10000 m	Ignas Brasevičius	29:53.81 PB	Modestas Dirsė	33:03.47 PB	Dominykas Pacauskas	33:08.23 PB
110 m hurdles (+0.6 m/s)	Rapolas Saulius	13.99	Rokas Ickys	14.32 PB	Domas Gailevičius	15.05 PB
400 m hurdles	Artūras Janauskas	53.56	Ignas Dailidėnas	1:00.60 PB	Lukas Janiulis	1:02.47 PB
3000 m steeplechase	Giedrius Valinčius	9:32.44	Jonas Beleška	9:47.69 PB	Darius Petkevičius	10:02.34
4 × 100 m relay	Vilnius; Giedrius Rupeika; Rapolas Saulius; Rokas Silkinis; Danas Sodaitis	41.61	Panevėžys; Gabrielius Bžeskis; Domantas Dobrega; Einius Trumpa; Kristupas Seikauskas	41.68	Vilnius; Olegas Ivanikovas; Valerijus Bakhovkin; Dariuš Križanovskij; Nojus Budavičius	43.90
WR world record | AR area record | CR championship record | GR games record | NR national record | OR Olympic record | PB personal best | SB season best | WL world leading (in a given season)

=== Field Events ===
Event	Gold		Silver		Bronze	
High Jump	Adrijus Glebauskas	2.25	Dainius Pazdrazdis	2.15	Augustas Bukauskas	2.10
Pole Vault	Osvaldas Gedrimas	4.90	Lukas Kolpakovas	4.40	Danielius Adamavičius	3.80
Long Jump	Tomas Lotužis	7.38	Airidas Zabaras	7.16	Laurynas Vičas	7.10 PB
Triple Jump	Paulius Svarauskas	15.35	Tomas Lotužis	15.21	Gustas Griška	14.83 PB
Shot Put	Šarūnas Banevičius	17.87	Karolis Maisuradzė	16.45	Augustas Inda	15.87 PB
Discus Throw	Andrius Gudžius	68.16	Aleksas Abromavičius	60.39	Domantas Poška	56.57
Javelin Throw	Edis Matusevičius	81.38	Skirmantas Šimoliūnas	68.84	Tomas Sabašinskas	65.33 PB
WR world record | AR area record | CR championship record | GR games record | NR national record | OR Olympic record | PB personal best | SB season best | WL world leading (in a given season)

=== Combined events ===
Event	Gold		Silver		Bronze
Decathlon	Edgaras Benkunskas	7643 PB	Vytautas Savickas	4801	
Junior decathlon	Tadas Daugėla	6012	Oskaras Karlinskas	4974	
WR world record | AR area record | CR championship record | GR games record | NR national record | OR Olympic record | PB personal best | SB season best | WL world leading (in a given season)

== Women's events ==
=== Track Events ===
Event	Gold		Silver		Bronze	
100 m (+1.8 m/s)	Karolina Deliautaitė	11.68	Andrė Ožechauskaitė	11.71 NJR, NU16	Akvilė Andriukaitytė	11.69
200 m (+1.9 m/s)	Agnė Šerkšnienė	23.43	Akvilė Andriukaitytė	23.87	Eva Misiūnaitė	24.20
400 m	Agnė Šerkšnienė	52.29	Modesta Justė Morauskaitė	53.58	Eva Misiūnaitė	54.12
800 m	Gabija Galvydytė	2:11.12	Augustė Žikaitė	2:15.95	Eglė Vaitulevičiūtė	2:17.35
1500 m	Eglė Morenaitė	4:32.16	Viktorija Varnagirytė	4:32.99 PB	Vytautė Pabiržytė-Budavičienė	4:34.88
5000 m	Vaida Žūsinaitė-Nekrošienė	16:30.43	Viktorija Varnagirytė	17:08.71 PB	Lina Kiriliuk	17:15.63 PB
10000 m	Vaida Žūsinaitė-Nekrošienė	34:40.86 PB	Loreta Kančytė	35:59.09 PB		
100 m hurdles (+2.5 m/s)	Gabrielė Čeponytė	14.00	Gabija Klimukaitė	14.44	Aurėja Vaičekauskaitė	15.40
400 m hurdles	Modesta Justė Morauskaitė	57.67 PB	Kamilė Gargasaitė	1:02.58	Karolina Zeleniūtė	1:03.30 PB
3000 m steeplechase	Greta Karinauskaitė	10:42.24 PB	Auksė Linkutė	11:02.85	Meda Repšytė	11:30.40
4 × 100 m relay	Kaunas; Aistė Unskinaitė; Karolina Deliautaitė; Aistė Staurylaitė; Silvija Baubonytė	47.52	Raseiniai; Augustė Žikaitė; Roberta Žikaitė; Jogailė Petrokaitė; Urtė Kščenavičiūtė	48.30	Vilnius; Lukrecija Sabaitytė; Kornelija Okunevič; Juana Beganskaitė; Gunda Jakimavičiūtė	48.70
WR world record | AR area record | CR championship record | GR games record | NR national record | OR Olympic record | PB personal best | SB season best | WL world leading (in a given season)

=== Field events ===
Event	Gold		Silver		Bronze	
High Jump	Urtė Baikštytė	1.78	Satera Balčaitytė	1.75	Gintarė Tirevičiūtė	1.70
Pole Vault	Rugilė Miklyčiūtė	3.45	Neringa Skipskytė	3.10 PB	Karolina Jasaitė	3.00
Long Jump	Jogailė Petrokaitė	6.42	Luka Garšvaitė	6.35 PB	Simona Bukovskė	5.79
Triple Jump	Dovilė Kilty	14.18 CR	Diana Zagainova	13.61	Vaida Padimanskaitė	13.58 PB
Shot put	Ieva Zarankaitė	16.80	Agnė Jonkutė	14.22	Urtė Bačianskaitė	14.20
Discus throw	Ieva Zarankaitė	60.99	Zinaida Sendriūtė	56.48	Agnė Jonkutė	48.81
Javelin Throw	Liveta Jasiūnaitė	60.27	Indrė Jakubaitytė	53.18	Kamilė Kunickaitė	45.45
WR world record | AR area record | CR championship record | GR games record | NR national record | OR Olympic record | PB personal best | SB season best | WL world leading (in a given season)

=== Combined events ===
Event	Gold		Silver		Bronze	
Heptathlon	Beatričė Juškevičiūtė	5687 PB	Olivija Vaitaitytė	5308 PB	Atėnė Šliževičiūtė	5085 PB
WR world record | AR area record | CR championship record | GR games record | NR national record | OR Olympic record | PB personal best | SB season best | WL world leading (in a given season)
