= Lithuania at the 2024 European Athletics Championships =

- WA code: LTU
- National federation: Athletics Federation of Lithuania
- Website: lengvoji.lt

in Munich
- Competitors: 23 (8 men and 15 women)
- Medals Ranked 27th: Gold 0 Silver 0 Bronze 1 Total 1

European Athletics Championships appearances
- 1934; 1938–1990; 1994; 1998; 2002; 2006; 2010; 2012; 2014; 2016; 2018; 2022; 2024

Other related appearances
- Soviet Union (1946–1990)

Lithuania competed at the 2024 European Athletics Championships in Rome, Italy from 7–12 June 2024.

== Medalists ==
Medal	Name	Event	Date
Bronze	Mykolas Alekna	Men's discus throw	7 June

== Results ==
Estonia entered the following athletes.

Key

- Q = Qualified for the next round
- q = Qualified for the next round as a fastest loser or, in field events, by position without achieving the qualifying target
- NR = National record
- PB = Personal best
- SB = Season best
- N/A = Round not applicable for the event

=== Men's events ===
Track and road events

Athletes	Event	Heats		Semifinal		Final	
Athletes	Event	Result	Rank	Result	Rank	Result	Rank
Gediminas Truskauskas	200 m	20.78	8 q	20.86	15	did not advance	
Marius Žiūkas	20 km walk	—N/a				-	DSQ

Field events

Athletes	Event	Heats		Final	
Athletes	Event	Result	Rank	Result	Rank
Juozas Baikštys	High jump	2.12 m	24	did not advance	
Mykolas Alekna	Discus throw	67.50 m	1 Q	67.48 m	3rd place, bronze medalist(s)
Andrius Gudžius	Discus throw	63.02 m	9 q	64.43 m	7
Martynas Alekna	Discus throw	61.18 m	18	did not advance	
Edis Matusevičius	Javelin throw	84.82 m	2 Q	83.96 m	4

Combined events – Decathlon

Athlete	Event	100 m	LJ	SP	HJ	400 m	110H	DT	PV	JT	1500 m	Final	Rank
Edgaras Benkunskas	Result	11.17	7.17	14.92	2.02	50.58	14.70	45.02	4.60	61.26	4:51.44	7882	15
Edgaras Benkunskas	Points	823	854	785	822	788	886	767	790	757	610	7882	15

=== Women's events ===
Track and road events

Athletes	Event	Heats		Semifinal		Final	
Athletes	Event	Result	Rank	Result	Rank	Result	Rank
Lukrecija Sabaitytė	200 m	23.56	31	did not advance			
Modesta Justė Morauskaitė	400 m	Bye		52.95	23	did not advance	
Loreta Kančytė	Half marathon	—N/a				1:14:56	52
Austėja Kavaliauskaitė	20 km walk	—N/a				1:37:14	24
Brigita Virbalytė	20 km walk	—N/a				1:40:14	29
Monika Vaiciukevičiūtė	20 km walk	—N/a				1:52:02	31

Field events

Athletes	Event	Heats		Final	
Athletes	Event	Result	Rank	Result	Rank
Urtė Baikštytė	High jump	1.81 m	23	did not advance	
Airinė Palšytė	High jump	1.89 m	13	did not advance	
Jogailė Petrokaitė	Long jump	6.65 m	10 q	6.68 m	10
Aina Grikšaitė	Triple jump	13.71 m	16	did not advance	
Dovilė Kilty	Triple jump	13.69 m	18	did not advance	
Diana Zagainova	Triple jump	13.64 m	19	did not advance	
Ieva Gumbs	Discus throw	56.56 m	19	did not advance	
Liveta Jasiūnaitė	Javelin throw	55.85 m	17	did not advance	

Combined events – Heptathlon

Athlete	Event	100H	HJ	SP	200 m	LJ	JT	800 m	Final	Rank
Beatričė Juškevičiūtė	Result	13.18	1.65	13.33	24.09	6.00	41.47	2:16.88	6025	13
Beatričė Juškevičiūtė	Points	1097	795	749	972	850	696	866	6025	13
