= Rowing at the 2025 Summer World University Games – Men's coxless pair =

Men's coxless pair at the 2025 Summer World University Games
- Venue: Regattabahn Duisburg
- Location: Duisburg
- Dates: 25 July (heats); 26 July (semifinals); 27 July (finals A—D)
- Competitors: 40 from 20 nations

Medalists
gold medal	Domantas Stankūnas; Dovydas Stankūnas	Lithuania
silver medal	Paolo Covini; Alessandro Gardino	Italy
bronze medal	Toby Lassen; Felix Rawlinson	Great Britain

The men's coxless pair at the 2025 Summer World University Games in Rhine-Ruhr, Germany was held from 25 to 27 July 2025. Domantas Stankūnas and Dovydas Stankūnas from Lithuania won the gold medals, Paolo Covini and Alessandro Gardino from Italy earned the silver medals and Toby Lassen and Felix Rawlinson from Great Britain took the bronze medals.

== Schedule ==
All times are Central European Time (UTC+1)

Date	Time	Round
25 July 2025	8:46	Heats
26 July 2025	9:02	Semifinals
27 July 2025	8:38	Final D
27 July 2025	8:46	Final C
27 July 2025	8:54	Final B
27 July 2025	11:30	Final A

== Results ==
=== Heats ===
The two fastest boats in each heat and the four fastest times advanced directly to the semifinals. The next six fastest times advanced to the final C. The remaining boats were sent to the final D.

==== Heat 1 ====
Rank	Rowers	Country	Time	Notes
1	(b) Yaroslav Melnikov (s) Vladislav Galkin	Kazakhstan	6:55.96	Q
2	(b) Phumelele Tshabalala (s) Jordan Craig	South Africa	6:56.95	Q
3	(b) Ádám Csizmadia (s) Péter Gasztonyi	Hungary	6:58.31	FC
4	(b) Chen Pak Hong (s) Wong Ching	Hong Kong	6:59.88	FC
5	(b) Siebe De Vil (s) Jules Vanoverschelde	Belgium	7:05.15	FC

==== Heat 2 ====
Rank	Rowers	Country	Time	Notes
1	(b) Alessandro Gardino (s) Paolo Covini	Italy	6:37.07	Q
2	(b) Toby Lassen (s) Felix Rawlinson	Great Britain	6:38.92	Q
3	(b) Jakub Sprinzl (s) Jakub Vančura	Czech Republic	6:49.39	Q
4	(b) Ahmet Ali Kabadayı (s) Kaan Yılmaz Aydın	Turkey	6:55.43	Q
5	(b) Hiroki Aoki (s) Keita Joto	Japan	7:07.55	FC

==== Heat 3 ====
Rank	Rowers	Country	Time	Notes
1	(b) Domantas Stankūnas (s) Dovydas Stankūnas	Lithuania	6:44.02	Q
2	(b) Tom Tewes (s) Mark Hinrichs	Germany	6:50.20	Q
3	(b) Vitus Haider (s) Xaver Haider	Austria	6:51.40	Q
4	(b) Murad Sadykhov (s) Lev Dobriantsev	Azerbaijan	6:57.84	Q
5	(b) Ankit (s) Vishal	India	7:11.68	FC

==== Heat 4 ====
Rank	Rowers	Country	Time	Notes
1	(b) Connor Attridge (s) Robert Bryden	Canada	6:50.90	Q
2	(b) Wouter Hoepman (s) Floris Reinders	Netherlands	6:59.35	Q
3	(b) Iker dos Reis (s) Francisco Figueira	Spain	7:00.60	FC
4	(b) An Ho-jin (s) Jung Jae-min	South Korea	7:22.87	FD
5	(b) Danil Binder (s) Oleksandr Shchepochkin	Ukraine	7:52.99	FD

=== Semifinals ===
The three fastest boats in each heat advanced directly to the final A. The remaining boats were sent to the final B.

==== Semifinal 1 ====
Rank	Rowers	Country	Time	Notes
1	(b) Toby Lassen (s) Felix Rawlinson	Great Britain	6:48.47	FA
2	(b) Paolo Covini (s) Alessandro Gardino	Italy	6:51.31	FA
3	(b) Jakub Sprinzl (s) Jakub Vančura	Czech Republic	6:53.47	FA
4	(b) Murad Sadykhov (s) Lev Dobriantsev	Azerbaijan	6:57.68	FB
5	(b) Wouter Hoepman (s) Floris Reinders	Netherlands	6:58.84	FB
6	(b) Yaroslav Melnikov (s) Vladislav Galkin	Kazakhstan	7:13.67	FB

==== Semifinal 2 ====
Rank	Rowers	Country	Time	Notes
1	(b) Domantas Stankūnas (s) Dovydas Stankūnas	Lithuania	6:44.78	FA
2	(b) Connor Attridge (s) Robert Bryden	Canada	6:49.41	FA
3	(b) Tom Tewes (s) Mark Hinrichs	Germany	6:53.76	FA
4	(b) Kaan Yılmaz Aydın (s) Ahmet Ali Kabadayı	Turkey	6:56.90	FB
5	(b) Xaver Haider (s) Vitus Haider	Austria	7:01.90	FB
6	(b) Phumelele Tshabalala (s) Jordan Craig	South Africa	7:04.60	FB

=== Finals ===
The A final determined the rankings for places 1 to 6. Additional rankings were determined in the other finals.

==== Final D ====
Rank	Rowers	Country	Time	Total rank
1	(b) An Ho-jin (s) Jung Jae-min	South Korea	7:44.14	19
2	(b) Danil Binder (s) Oleksandr Shchepochkin	Ukraine	8:19.41	20

==== Final C ====
Rank	Rowers	Country	Time	Total rank
1	(b) Wong Ching (s) Chen Pak Hong	Hong Kong	7:21.34	13
2	(b) Siebe De Vil (s) Jules Vanoverschelde	Belgium	7:27.12	14
3	(b) Ádám Csizmadia (s) Péter Gasztonyi	Hungary	7:30.64	15
4	(b) Iker dos Reis (s) Francisco Figueira	Spain	7:31.89	16
5	(b) Ankit (s) Vishal	India	7:41.54	17
6	(b) Keita Joto (s) Hiroki Aoki	Japan	7:41.84	18

==== Final B ====
Rank	Rowers	Country	Time	Total rank
1	(b) Phumelele Tshabalala (s) Jordan Craig	South Africa	7:15.89	7
2	(b) Xaver Haider (s) Vitus Haider	Austria	7:16.42	8
3	(b) Murad Sadykhov (s) Lev Dobriantsev	Azerbaijan	7:22.62	9
4	(b) Wouter Hoepman (s) Floris Reinders	Netherlands	7:25.08	10
5	(b) Kaan Yılmaz Aydın (s) Ahmet Ali Kabadayı	Turkey	7:25.35	11
6	(b) Yaroslav Melnikov (s) Vladislav Galkin	Kazakhstan	7:51.84	12

==== Final A ====
Rank	Rowers	Country	Time	Notes
1st place, gold medalist(s)	(b) Domantas Stankūnas (s) Dovydas Stankūnas	Lithuania	6:51.22	
2nd place, silver medalist(s)	(b) Paolo Covini (s) Alessandro Gardino	Italy	6:57.83	
3rd place, bronze medalist(s)	(b) Toby Lassen (s) Felix Rawlinson	Great Britain	7:01.75	
4	(b) Connor Attridge (s) Robert Bryden	Canada	7:07.26	
5	(b) Tom Tewes (s) Mark Hinrichs	Germany	7:08.77	
6	(b) Jakub Sprinzl (s) Jakub Vančura	Czech Republic	7:15.58	
