= Stankūnas =

Stankūnas is a surname. Notable people with the surname include:

- Domantas Stankūnas
- Dovydas Stankūnas
