= Lithuania at the 2022 World Athletics Championships =

Lithuania at the 2022 World Championships in Athletics
- Flag of Lithuania
- WA code: LTU
- National federation: Athletics Federation of Lithuania
- Website: lengvoji.lt

in Eugene, Oregon, United States 15 July 2022 – 24 July 2022
- Competitors: 9 (4 men and 5 women) in 8 events
- Medals Ranked 31st: Gold 0 Silver 1 Bronze 1 Total 2

World Championships in Athletics appearances
- 1993; 1995; 1997; 1999; 2001; 2003; 2005; 2007; 2009; 2011; 2013; 2015; 2017; 2019; 2022; 2023

Lithuania competed at the 2022 World Athletics Championships in Eugene, Oregon, United States, from 15 to 24 July 2022. Lithuania entered 9 athletes.

== Medalists ==
The following competitors from Lithuania won medals at the Championships:

Medal	Athlete	Event	Date
Silver	Mykolas Alekna	Discus throw	19 July
Bronze	Andrius Gudžius	Discus throw	19 July

== Results ==
=== Men ===
Track and road events

Athlete	Event	Heat		Semi-final		Final	
Athlete	Event	Result	Rank	Result	Rank	Result	Rank
Arturas Mastianica	35 kilometres walk	—				2:36:25	33
Marius Žiūkas	35 kilometres walk	—				2:34:16 NR	27

Field events

Athlete	Event	Qualification		Final	
Athlete	Event	Distance	Position	Distance	Position
Mykolas Alekna	Discus throw	68.91	1 Q	69.27	2nd place, silver medalist(s)
Andrius Gudžius	Discus throw	66.60	5 Q	67.55	3rd place, bronze medalist(s)

=== Women ===
Track and road events

Athlete	Event	Heat		Semi-final		Final	
Athlete	Event	Result	Rank	Result	Rank	Result	Rank
Modesta Justė Morauskaitė	400 metres	51.27	12 Q	52.19	21	Did not advance	
Brigita Virbalytė	20 kilometres walk	—				1:35:36	23

Field events

Athlete	Event	Qualification		Final	
Athlete	Event	Distance	Position	Distance	Position
Urtė Baikštytė	High jump	1.86	21	Did not advance	
Ieva Zarankaitė	Discus throw	57.57	25	Did not advance	
Liveta Jasiūnaitė	Javelin throw	63.80	3 Q	58.97	10
