= Lithuania at the 2018 European Championships =

- IOC code: LTU

in (United Kingdom) Glasgow (Germany) Berlin 2 August 2018 – 12 August 2018
- Competitors: 68 in 6 sports
- Medals Ranked 20th: Gold 1 Silver 4 Bronze 2 Total 7

European Championships appearances
- 2018; 2022

Lithuania competed at the inaugural 7 sports 2018 European Championships from 2 to 12 August 2018. It competed in 6 sports.

== Medallists ==
Medal	Name	Sport	Event	Date
Gold	Andrius Gudžius	Athletics	Men's discus throw	8 August
Silver	Dovydas Nemeravičius; Saulius Ritter; Rolandas Maščinskas; Aurimas Adomavičius	Rowing	Men's quadruple sculls	4 August
Silver	Mindaugas Griškonis	Rowing	Men's single sculls	5 August
Silver	Rūta Meilutytė	Swimming	Women's 100 metre breaststroke	5 August
Silver	Danas Rapšys	Swimming	Men's 200 metre freestyle	7 August
Bronze	Milda Valčiukaitė; Ieva Adomavičiūtė	Rowing	Women's double sculls	4 August
Bronze	Liveta Jasiūnaitė	Athletics	Women's javelin throw	10 August
