= Lithuanian Snowboarding Championships =

National championship of snowboarding in Lithuania

Lithuanian Snowboarding Championships (Lithuanian: Lietuvos snieglenčių sporto čempionatas) is the open national championship of snowboarding in Lithuania, established in 2011.

== Rules ==
There are 3 stages in the championship. In each stage, the top 10 snowboarders receive from 1-10 points. The athlete who has the most points after all 3 stages wins the national championship.

== Results ==
=== 2011 ===
Stage	Date	City	Name	Winner	Winner in overall
1	January 29	Vilnius	Hot Rails Jam	Aivaras Dambrauskas	Aivaras Dambrauskas (10 pts)
2	February 19	Ignalina	Ignalina Big Air	Tadas Malinauskas	Vytautas Vaičaitis (11 pts)

==== Snowboarding Cross ====
Lithuanian Snowboarding Cross Championships was held at March 19 in NOKIA Snow Park, Druskininkai.

===== Results =====
	Gold	Silver	Bronze
Women	Modesta Morauskaitė	Viktorija Šmitienė	Miglė Glinskytė
Youth Boys	Motiejus Morauskas	Simas Steponavičius	Aras Arlauskas
Junior Boys	Vytautas Lukosevičius	Egidijus Dilys	Gediminas Kučinskas
Men	Vytautas Vaičaitis	Edvardas Šmitas	Lukas Kirkilionis
