= Lithuania at the 2019 World Athletics Championships =

Lithuania at the 2019 World Championships in Athletics
- WA code: LTU

in Doha
- Competitors: 11 (5 men and 6 women)

World Championships in Athletics appearances
- 1993; 1995; 1997; 1999; 2001; 2003; 2005; 2007; 2009; 2011; 2013; 2015; 2017; 2019; 2022; 2023

Lithuania competed at the 2019 World Athletics Championships in Doha, Qatar, from 27 September–6 October 2019.

== Result ==
Key

- Note–Ranks given for track events are for the entire round
- Q = Qualified for the next round
- q = Qualified for the next round as a fastest loser or, in field events, by position without achieving the qualifying target
- NR = National record
- GR = Games record
- PB = Personal best
- SB = Season best
- DNF = Did not finish
- DNS = Did not start
- NM = No mark
- N/A = Round not applicable for the event
- Bye = Athlete not required to compete in round

=== Men ===
Track and road events

Athlete	Event	Heat		Semifinal		Final	
Athlete	Event	Result	Rank	Result	Rank	Result	Rank
Marius Žiūkas	20 km walk	—				1:30:22	11
Arturas Mastianica	50 km walk	—				4:21:54	15

Field events

Athlete	Event	Qualification		Final	
Athlete	Event	Distance	Position	Distance	Position
Adrijus Glebauskas	High jump	2.22	21	Did not advance	
Andrius Gudžius	Discus throw	64.14	8 q	61.55	12
Edis Matusevičius	Javelin throw	79.60	22	Did not advance	

=== Women ===
Track and road events

Athlete	Event	Heat		Semifinal		Final	
Athlete	Event	Result	Rank	Result	Rank	Result	Rank
Živilė Vaiciukevičiūtė	20 km walk	—				1:39:26	23
Monika Bytautienė	Marathon	—				DNF	

Field events

Athlete	Event	Qualification		Final	
Athlete	Event	Distance	Position	Distance	Position
Airinė Palšytė	High jump	1.85	22	Did not advance	
Dovilė Kilty	Triple jump	14.09	13	Did not advance	
Diana Zagainova	Triple jump	13.64	22	Did not advance	
Liveta Jasiūnaitė	Javelin throw	56.90	23	Did not advance	
