= Lithuania at the 2016 European Athletics Championships =

- WA code: LTU
- National federation: LAF
- Website: lengvoji.lt

in Amsterdam
- Competitors: 19 (6 men and 13 women) in 14 events
- Medals Ranked =24th: Gold 0 Silver 1 Bronze 0 Total 1

European Athletics Championships appearances
- 1934; 1938–1990; 1994; 1998; 2002; 2006; 2010; 2012; 2014; 2016; 2018; 2022; 2024

Other related appearances
- Soviet Union (1946–1990)

Lithuania competed at the 2016 European Athletics Championships in Amsterdam, Netherlands, between 6 and 10 July 2016.

== Medalists ==
Medal	Name	Event	Date
Silver	Airinė Palšytė	Women's high jump	7 July

== Results ==
Men

Track & road events

Athlete	Event	Heat		Semifinal		Final	
Athlete	Event	Result	Rank	Result	Rank	Result	Rank
Rytis Sakalauskas	100 m	10.37	4 q	10.40	6	did not advance	
Remigijus Kančys	Half marathon	—				1:07:12	48

Field Events

Athlete	Event	Qualification		Final	
Athlete	Event	Distance	Rank	Distance	Rank
Raivydas Stanys	High jump	2.23	17	did not advance	
Andrius Gudžius	Discus throw	63.60 =SB	13	did not advance	
Eligijus Ruškys	Discus throw	NM		did not advance	
Edis Matusevičius	Javelin throw	77.86	21	did not advance	

Women

Track & road events

Athlete	Event	Heat		Semifinal		Final	
Athlete	Event	Result	Rank	Result	Rank	Result	Rank
Lina Grinčikaitė Samuolė	100 m	11.77	7	did not advance			
Eglė Balčiūnaitė	800 m	2:08.14	6	did not advance			
Rasa Drazdauskaitė	Half marathon	—				1:11:47 PB	4
Monika Juodeškaitė	Half marathon	—				1:17:39	63
Remalda Kergytė-Dauskurdienė	Half marathon	—				1:17:56	69
Diana Lobacevske	Half marathon	—				1:14:06	33

Field Events

Athlete	Event	Qualification		Final	
Athlete	Event	Distance	Rank	Distance	Rank
Airinė Palšytė	High jump	1.92	1 Q	1.96 SB	2nd place, silver medalist(s)
Jogaile Petrokaitė	Long jump	6.17	23	did not advance	
Giedrė Kupstytė	Shot put	15.63	24	did not advance	
Zinaida Sendriūtė	Discus throw	58.88	14 Q	56.17	13
Indrė Jakubaitytė	Javelin throw	NM		did not advance	
Liveta Jasiūnaitė	Javelin throw	58.21	11 q	53.94	12

Combined events – Heptathlon

Athlete	Event	100H	HJ	SP	200 m	LJ	JT	800 m	Final	Rank
Austra Skujytė	Result	14.25	1.80	16.31	26.69	6.03	45.75	DNF	5245	14
Austra Skujytė	Points	943	978	949	738	859	778	0	5245	14
