= Lithuania at the 2006 European Athletics Championships =

- WA code: LTU

in Gothenburg
- Competitors: 13
- Medals Ranked 17th: Gold 1 Silver 0 Bronze 0 Total 1

European Athletics Championships appearances
- 1934; 1938–1990; 1994; 1998; 2002; 2006; 2010; 2012; 2014; 2016; 2018; 2022; 2024

Other related appearances
- Soviet Union (1946–1990)

Lithuania, at the 2006 European Athletics Championships held in Sweden. It won 1 gold medal. In this European Championship started 13 athletes who will represented Lithuania.

== Medals ==
=== Medal table ===
| 2006 Gothenburg | Gold | Silver | Bronze | Total |
| Lithuania (LTU) | 1 | 0 | 0 | 1 |

=== Medalists ===
| Medal | Name | Event | Date |
|---|---|---|---|
| Gold | Virgilijus Alekna | Men's discus throw | 12 August |

== Results ==
| Place | Athlete | Event | Results |
|---|---|---|---|
| 1 | Virgilijus Alekna | Discus Throw | 68.67 |
| 4 | Živilė Balčiūnaitė | Marathon | 2:31:01 |
| 11 | Edita Lingytė, Jekaterina Šakovič, Aina Valatkevičiūtė, Jūratė Kudirkaitė | 4 × 400 m | 3:37.68 |
| 18 | Tomas Intas | Javelin Throw | 74.76 |
| 18 | Zinaida Sandriūtė | Discus Throw | 53.22 |
| 21 | Irina Krakoviak | 1500 m | 4:13.47 |
| 21 | Vytautas Seliukas | Long Jump | 7,58 |
| 21 | Sonata Milušauskaitė | 20 km walk | 1:36:20 |
| 22 | Rasa Troup | 3000 m steeplechase | 9:53.14 |
| 23 | Viktorija Žemaitytė | Heptathlon | 5694 |
| 26 | Audra Dagelytė | 100 m | 11.74 |
| DNF | Darius Draudvila | Decathlon | - |
| DNF | Kristina Saltanovič | 20 km walk | - |
