= Lithuania at the 2002 European Athletics Championships =

- WA code: LTU

in München
- Competitors: 13
- Medals Ranked 22nd: Gold 0 Silver 1 Bronze 0 Total 1

European Athletics Championships appearances
- 1934; 1938–1990; 1994; 1998; 2002; 2006; 2010; 2012; 2014; 2016; 2018; 2022; 2024

Other related appearances
- Soviet Union (1946–1990)

Lithuania, at the 2002 European Athletics Championships held in Germany. In this European Championship started 13 athletes who represented Lithuania.

== Results ==
2002 Munich	Gold	Silver	Bronze	Total
Lithuania (LTU)	0	1	0	1

Place	Athlete	Event	Results
2	Virgilijus Alekna	Discus throw	66.62
4	Austra Skujytė	Heptathlon	6275
7	Kristina Saltanovič	20 km walk	1:30:44
9-11	Agnė Eggerth	100 m	11.44
17	Arvydas Nazarovas	Triple Jump	16.17
18	Žana Minina	400 m	53.50
22	Inga Juodeškienė	1000 m	32:58.56
22	Virginija Petkevičienė	Triple Jump	13,14
25	Rasa Drazdauskaitė	1500 m	4:16.80
DSQ	Gintaras Andriuškevičius	20 km walk	-
DNF	Remigija Nazarovienė	Heptathlon	-
DNF	Sonata Milušauskaitė	20 km walk	-
	Indrė Jakubaitytė	Javelin Throw	0
