= Lithuania at the 2015 World Championships in Athletics =

- WA code: LTU
- National federation: Lietuvos lengvosios atletikos federacija
- Website: www.lengvoji.lt

in Beijing
- Competitors: 11
- Medals: Gold 0 Silver 0 Bronze 0 Total 0

World Championships in Athletics appearances
- 1993; 1995; 1997; 1999; 2001; 2003; 2005; 2007; 2009; 2011; 2013; 2015; 2017; 2019; 2022; 2023; 2025

Lithuania competed at the 2015 World Championships in Athletics in Beijing, China, from 22–30 August 2015.

== Results ==
(q – qualified, NM – no mark, SB – season best)

=== Men ===
Track and road events

Athlete	Event	Heat		Semifinal		Final	
Athlete	Event	Result	Rank	Result	Rank	Result	Rank
Marius Šavelskis	20 kilometres walk	—N/a				DSQ	
Tadas Šuškevičius	50 kilometres walk	—N/a				3:56:27 SB	22

Field events

Athlete	Event	Qualification		Final	
Athlete	Event	Distance	Position	Distance	Position
Raivydas Stanys	High jump	NM		did not advance	
Andrius Gudžius	Discus throw	62.22	14	did not advance	

=== Women ===
Track and road events

Athlete	Event	Heat		Semifinal		Final	
Athlete	Event	Result	Rank	Result	Rank	Result	Rank
Rasa Drazdauskaitė	Marathon	—N/a				2:31:23 SB	11
Eglė Staišiūnaitė	400 metres hurdles	56.17 PB	19 Q	56.48	22	did not advance	
Neringa Aidietytė	20 kilometres walk	—N/a				DSQ	
Brigita Virbalytė-Dimšienė	20 kilometres walk	—N/a				1:30:20 PB	7

Field events

Athlete	Event	Qualification		Final	
Athlete	Event	Distance	Position	Distance	Position
Dovilė Dzindzaletaitė	Triple jump	13.58	19	did not advance	
Airinė Palšytė	High jump	1.89	14	did not advance	
Zinaida Sendriūtė	Discus throw	60.33	13	did not advance	

== Sources ==
- Lithuanian team
