= Lithuania at the 1998 European Athletics Championships =

- WA code: LTU

in Budapest
- Competitors: 16
- Medals Ranked 22nd: Gold 0 Silver 0 Bronze 1 Total 1

European Athletics Championships appearances
- 1934; 1938–1990; 1994; 1998; 2002; 2006; 2010; 2012; 2014; 2016; 2018; 2022; 2024

Other related appearances
- Soviet Union (1946–1990)

Lithuania, at the 1998 European Athletics Championships held in Hungary. In this European Championship, started 16 athletes who represented Lithuania.

== Results ==
1998 Budapest	Gold	Silver	Bronze	Total
Lithuania (LTU)	0	0	1	1

Place	Athlete	Event	Results
3	Virgilijus Alekna	Discus throw	66.46
4	Remigija Nazarovienė	Heptathlon	6394
9	Romas Ubartas	Discus Throw	61.66
11	Vaclovas Kidykas	Discus throw	60.21
11	Rita Ramanauskaitė	Javelin throw	57.11
14	Audrius Raizgys	Triple Jump	16.39
16	Irina Krakoviak	800 m	2:06.29
17	Tomas Bardauskas	Long Jump	7,74
18	Nelė Žilinskienė	High Jump	1,87
18	Arūnas Jurkšas	Javelin throw	77,37
20	Saulius Kleiza	Shot Put	18,57
21	Sonata Milušauskaitė	10 km walk	46:32
23	Renata Gustaitytė	Discus Throw	55.37
24-26	Agnė Visockaitė	100 m	11.85
DNF	Vilija Birbalaitė	Marathon	-
DNF	Daugvinas Zujus	50 km walk	-
