= Lithuania at the 2012 European Athletics Championships =

- WA code: LTU

in Helsinki
- Medals Ranked 20th: Gold 0 Silver 1 Bronze 1 Total 2

European Athletics Championships appearances
- 1934; 1938–1990; 1994; 1998; 2002; 2006; 2010; 2012; 2014; 2016; 2018; 2022; 2024

Other related appearances
- Soviet Union (1946–1990)

Lithuania was represented by 24 athletes at the 2012 European Athletics Championships held in Helsinki, Finland.

== Medals ==
Medal	Athlete	Event	Result	Date
Bronze	Lina Grinčikaitė	100 m	11.32	28 June
Silver	Raivydas Stanys	High jump	2.31	29 June

== Participants ==
Event	Men	Women
100 m	Rytis Sakalauskas	Lina Grinčikaitė
400 m		Agnė Šerkšnienė
800 m	Vitalij Kozlov	Eglė Balčiūnaitė; Natalija Piliušina
1500 m		Natalija Piliušina
100/110 m hurdles	Mantas Šilkauskas	~~Sonata Tamošaitytė~~
400 m hurdles	Silvestras Guogis	Eglė Staišiūnaitė
3000 m steeplechase		Vaida Žūsinaitė
High jump	Raivydas Stanys	Airinė Palšytė; Austra Skujytė
Long jump	Povilas Mykolaitis	
Triple jump	Mantas Dilys	
Shot put		Austra Skujytė
Discus throw	Andrius Gudžius	Zinaida Sendriūtė
Javelin throw		Indrė Jakubaitytė
4 x 100 m relay	Rytis Sakalauskas; Žilvinas Adomavičius; Egidijus Dilys; Aivaras Pranckevičius; Martas Skrabulis; Kostas Skrabulis	

== Results ==
=== Men ===
==== Track ====
Athlete	Event	Results					Place
Athlete	Event	1 Round	Place	Semifinal	Place	Final	Place
Rytis Sakalauskas	100 m	10.23	1stQ	10.23	2nd Q	DNF	DNF
Vitalij Kozlov	800 m	1:48.61	5th	-	-	-	27th
Mantas Šilkauskas	110 m hurdles	14.11	6th	-	-	-	28th
Silvestras Guogis	400 m hurdles	51.25	4thq	51.15 (SB)	8th	-	20th
Egidijus Dilys; Žilvinas Adomavičius; Martas Skrabulis; Aivaras Pranckevičius; ~~Rytis Sakalauskas~~; ~~Kostas Skrabulis~~	4x100 m	40.68	6th			-	13th

==== Field ====
Athlete	Event	Results			Place
Athlete	Event	Qualif.	Place	Final	Place
Raivydas Stanys	High jump	2.26 (+0x)	1st Q	2.31 (+1x)	Silver
Povilas Mykolaitis	Long jump	X	DNF		DNF
Mantas Dilys	Triple jump	X	NM	-	NM
Andrius Gudžius	Discus throwing	55.80 (x-55.80-x)	15th		30th

=== Women ===
==== Track ====
Athlete	Event	Results					Place
Athlete	Event	1 Round	Place	Semifinal	Place	Final	Place
Lina Grinčikaitė	100 m	11.38	1st Q	11.34 (SB)	3rd Q	11.32 (SB)	Bronze
Agnė Šerkšnienė	400 m	52.89	3rd Q	53.07	7th	-	15th
Eglė Balčiūnaitė	800 m	2:05.21	5th			-	14th
Natalija Piliušina	800 m	2:02.12 (PB)	3rd q			2:06.59	8th
~~Natalija Piliušina~~	1500 m						-
~~Sonata Tamošaitytė~~	100 m hurdles						-
Eglė Staišiūnaitė	400 m hurdles	56.58 (PB)	4thq	58.76	7th	-	15th
Vaida Žūsinaitė	3000 m steeplechase	9:58.37 (PB)	9th			-	19th

==== Field ====
Athlete	Event	Results			Place
Athlete	Event	Qualif.	Place	Final	Place
Airinė Palšytė	High jump	1,90 (+2x)	6thq	1.89 (+4x)	9th
Austra Skujytė	High jump	1,87 (+4x)	5th	-	13th
Austra Skujytė	Shot put	16.73	6th q	16.53	11th
Zinaida Sendriūtė	Discus throwing	53.97	7th	-	17th
Indrė Jakubaitytė	Javelin throwing	54.39	7th	-	15th

== Injuries ==
- Rytis Sakalauskas injured himself after falling in semifinals of 100 m. He still showed up at the final, but after start he not started to run. Sakalauskas also withdrew from national 4x100 m relay team.
- Povilas Mykolaitis injured himself after first attempt in Long Jump qualifications.

== Broadcasting ==
- Eurosport
