= Lithuania at the 2009 World Championships in Athletics =

- WA code: LTU

in Berlin
- Competitors: 15 (6 men, 9 women)
- Medals: Gold 0 Silver 0 Bronze 0 Total 0

World Championships in Athletics appearances
- 1993; 1995; 1997; 1999; 2001; 2003; 2005; 2007; 2009; 2011; 2013; 2015; 2017; 2019; 2022; 2023; 2025

Lithuania competes at the 2009 World Championships in Athletics from 15 to 23 August in Berlin.

== Team selection ==
Track and road events

Event	Athletes	
Event	Men	Women
800 metres		Irina Krakoviak
1500 metres		Irina Krakoviak
100 metre hurdles		Sonata Tamošaitytė
20 km race walk	Vilius Mikelionis	Kristina Saltanovič; Brigita Virbalytė
50 km race walk	Donatas Škarnulis; Tadas Šuškevičius	
Marathon		Živilė Balčiūnaitė; Remalda Kergytė

Field and combined events

Event	Athletes	
Event	Men	Women
Triple jump	Mantas Dilys	
Javelin throw	Tomas Intas	Indrė Jakubaitytė
Shot Put		Austra Skujytė
Discus throw	Virgilijus Alekna	Zinaida Sendriūtė

== Results ==
Event	Athlete	Results			
Event	Athlete	Heat	Semifinal	Final	Place
800 m	Irina Krakoviak	2:04,26	DNA		27
1 500 m	Irina Krakoviak	4:08,96	4:12,54	DNA	22
100 m hurdles	Sonata Tamošaitytė	13,44	DNA		31
20 km walk	Vilius Mikelionis			1:32:53	45
20 km walk	Kristina Saltanovič			1:31:23	8
20 km walk	Brigita Virbalytė			1:36:28	24
50 km walk	Donatas Škarnulis			3:50:56	14
50 km walk	Tadas Šuškevičius			3:54:29 (PR)	17
Marathon	Živilė Balčiūnaitė			2:31:06	19
Marathon	Remalda Kergytė			2:45:28	52
Triple Jump	Mantas Dilys	16.09 - 16.02 - 15.70	DNA		36
Javelin throw	Tomas Intas	68.40 - x - x	DNA		43
Javelin throw	Indrė Jakubaitytė	55.86 - x- - x	DNA		24
Shot Put	Austra Skujytė	x - 17.52 - 17.86 (PR)	DNA		17
Discus throw	Zinaida Sendriūtė	52,85 - 54,55 - x	DNA		31
Discus throw	Virgilijus Alekna	65,04		66,36 - 66,32; 65,68 - 64,53; 66,24 - x	4

== See also ==
- 2009 Lithuanian Athletics Championships
