= Lina Kiriliuk =

Lithuanian long-distance runner (born 1996)

Personal information
- Born: 6 July 1996 (age 29)

Sport
- Country: Lithuania
- Sport: Long-distance running
Medal record
Lithuanian Athletics Championships
| Bronze medal – third place | 2020 Palanga | 5000 m |

Lina Kiriliuk (born 6 July 1996) is a Lithuanian long-distance runner. She competed in the women's half marathon at the 2020 World Athletics Half Marathon Championships held in Gdynia, Poland.

In 2019, she competed in the women's half marathon at the Summer Universiade held in Naples, Italy. She finished in 18th place. In 2020, she won the bronze medal in the women's 5000 metres event at the Lithuanian Athletics Championships held in Palanga, Lithuania.
