= Lithuania at the 2013 World Championships in Athletics =

- WA code: LTU
- National federation: Lietuvos lengvosios atletikos federacija
- Website: www.lengvoji.lt

in Moscow
- Competitors: 14
- Medals: Gold 0 Silver 0 Bronze 0 Total 0

World Championships in Athletics appearances
- 1993; 1995; 1997; 1999; 2001; 2003; 2005; 2007; 2009; 2011; 2013; 2015; 2017; 2019; 2022; 2023

Lithuania competed at the 2013 World Championships in Athletics in Moscow, Russia, from 10–18 August 2013.

== Qualification standards ==
18 athletes from Lithuania in total achieved qualification standards: Marius Žiūkas (A, 20 km walk), Tadas Šuškevičius (A, 50 km walk; B, 20 km walk), Tomas Gaidamavičius (B, 50 km walk), Ričardas Rekst (B, 50 km walk), Rasa Drazdauskaitė (Marathon), Diana Lobačevskė (Marathon), Remalda Kergytė (Marathon), Živilė Balčiūnaitė (Marathon), Austra Skujytė (A, Heptathlon), Kristina Saltanovič (A, 20 km walk), Brigita Virbalytė (A, 20 km walk), Neringa Aidietytė (A, 20 km walk), Virgilijus Alekna (B, discus throw), Zinaida Sendriūtė (A, discus throw), Agnė Šerkšnienė (B, 400 m; B, 200 m), Lina Grinčikaitė (B, 100 m), Airinė Palšytė (B, high jump), Eglė Balčiūnaitė (A, 800 m). (Note: Austra Skujytė and Rasa Drazauskaitė won't participate, Tomas Gaidamavičius and Ričardas Rekst can't enter because of B standards)

In the 20Km race walk, Marius Žiūkas came 24th with a time of 1:25:17.
