= Lithuania at the 2010 European Athletics Championships =

- WA code: LTU

in Barcelona
- Medals: Gold 0 Silver 0 Bronze 0 Total 0

European Athletics Championships appearances
- 1934; 1938–1990; 1994; 1998; 2002; 2006; 2010; 2012; 2014; 2016; 2018; 2022; 2024

Other related appearances
- Soviet Union (1946–1990)

Lithuania will be represented by 25 athletes at the 2010 European Athletics Championships held in Barcelona, Spain.

== Participants ==
Event	Men	Women
100 m		Lina Grinčikaitė
800 m	Vitalij Kozlov	Eglė Balčiūnaitė
100 m hurdles		Sonata Tamošaitytė
110 m hurdles	Mantas Šilkauskas	
400 m hurdles	Silvestras Guogis	
Marathon		Živilė Balčiūnaitė; Rasa Drazdauskaitė; Remalda Kergytė
20 km walk		Neringa Aidietytė; Kristina Saltanovič; Brigita Virbalytė-Dimšienė
50 km walk	Donatas Škarnulis; Tadas Šuškevičius	
High jump		Airinė Palšytė
Long jump	Povilas Mykolaitis	Lina Andrijauskaitė
Triple jump	Mantas Dilys	
Shot put		Austra Skujytė
Discus throw	Aleksas Abromavičius; Virgilijus Alekna	Zinaida Sendriūtė
Decathlon	Darius Draudvila	
4 × 100 m relay		Lina Andrijauskaitė; Lina Grinčikaitė; Edita Kavaliauskienė; Silva Pesackaitė; Sonata Tamošaitytė

== Results ==
2010 Barcelona	Gold	Silver	Bronze	Total
Lithuania (LTU)	1	0	0	1

=== Men ===
Track and road events

Event	Athletes	Heats		Semifinal		Final	
Event	Athletes	Result	Rank	Result	Rank	Result	Rank
800 m	Vitalij Kozlov	1:52.18	28th	did not advance			
110 m hurdles	Mantas Šilkauskas	DSQ					
400 m hurdles	Silvestras Guogis	53.38	26	did not advance			
50 km walk	Donatas Škarnulis					DSQ	
50 km walk	Tadas Šuškevičius					3:52:31 (PB)	9th

Field events

Event	Athletes	Qualification		Final	
Event	Athletes	Result	Rank	Result	Rank
Long jump	Povilas Mykolaitis	x - 7.85 - 7.94 (=SB)	13th	did not advance	
Triple jump	Mantas Dilys	16.32 (SB) - X - 16.08	21st	did not advance	
Discus throw	Aleksas Abromavičius	58.05 - X - X	29	did not advance	
Discus throw	Virgilijus Alekna	61.08 - X - 63.93	5th	64.64	5th
Decathlon	Darius Draudvila			8032 (PB)	6th

=== Women ===
Track and road events

Event	Athletes	Heats		Semifinal		Final	
Event	Athletes	Result	Rank	Result	Rank	Result	Rank
100 m	Lina Grinčikaitė	11.48	9th Q	11.34 (SB)	12th	did not advance	
800 m	Eglė Balčiūnaitė	2:01.19	14th	did not advance			
100 m hurdles	Sonata Tamošaitytė	13.31	19th	did not advance			
4 × 100 m relay	Lina Andrijauskaitė; Lina Grinčikaitė; Edita Kavaliauskienė; Silva Pesackaitė; Sonata Tamošaitytė	44.13	11th			did not advance	
20 km walk	Neringa Aidietytė					1:37:32	15th
20 km walk	Kristina Saltanovič					1:31:40 (SB)	7th
20 km walk	Brigita Virbalytė-Dimšienė					1:35:00	13th
Marathon	Živilė Balčiūnaitė					2:31:14 (SB)	1st place, gold medalist(s)
Marathon	Rasa Drazdauskaitė					2:38:55	15th
Marathon	Remalda Kergytė					2:55:12	34th

Field events

Event	Athletes	Qualification		Final	
Event	Athletes	Result	Rank	Result	Rank
Long jump	Lina Andrijauskaitė	5.51 - 6.31 - 6.35 (PB)	21st	did not advance	
High jump	Airinė Palšytė	1.90	18th	did not advance	
Shot put	Austra Skujytė	17.30 - 17.62 (SB) -	13th Q	17.72 (SB) - 16.96 - 17.54	12th
Discus throw	Zinaida Sendriūtė	57.51 - 58.98 (SB) - X	5th q	60.48 (PB) - 57.20 - 59.47 - 57.89 - 57.01 - 60.70 (PB)	5th
