= Lithuania at the 1994 European Athletics Championships =

- WA code: LTU

in Helsinki
- Competitors: 11
- Medals Ranked 22nd: Gold 0 Silver 0 Bronze 1 Total

European Athletics Championships appearances
- 1934; 1938–1990; 1994; 1998; 2002; 2006; 2010; 2012; 2014; 2016; 2018; 2022; 2024

Other related appearances
- Soviet Union (1946–1990)

Lithuania, at the 1994 European Athletics Championships held in Finland. In this European Championship started 11 athletes who will represented Lithuania.

== Results ==
1994 Helsinki	Gold	Silver	Bronze	Total
Lithuania (LTU)	0	0	1	1

Place	Athlete	Event	Results
3	Nelė Žilinskienė	High Jump	1,93
5	Rita Ramanauskaitė	Javelin Throw	61,54
7	Remigija Nazarovienė	Heptathlon	6262
8	Audrius Raizgys	Triple Jump	16,59
10	Saulius Kleiza	Shot Put	18,80
10	Danguolė Urbikienė	Shot Put	17.37
17	Sonata Milušauskaitė	10 km walk	46:17
17	Virgilijus Alekna	Discus Throw	56.38
19	Valdas Kazlauskas	20 km walk	1:27:02
DNF	Česlovas Kundrotas	Marathon	-
DNF	Viktoras Meškauskas	20 km walk	-
