= Lithuania at the 2011 World Championships in Athletics =

- WA code: LTU
- National federation: Lietuvos lengvosios atletikos federacija
- Website: www.lengvoji.lt

in Daegu
- Competitors: 15
- Medals: Gold 0 Silver 0 Bronze 0 Total 0

World Championships in Athletics appearances
- 1993; 1995; 1997; 1999; 2001; 2003; 2005; 2007; 2009; 2011; 2013; 2015; 2017; 2019; 2022; 2023

Lithuania competed at the 2011 World Championships in Athletics from August 27 to September 4 in Daegu, South Korea. A team of 15 athletes was announced to represent the country in the event. The team will be led by Olympic gold medalist, discus thrower Virgilijus Alekna.

== Results ==
=== Men ===
Athlete	Event	Preliminaries		Heats		Semifinals		Final	
Athlete	Event	Time Width Height	Rank	Time Width Height	Rank	Time Width Height	Rank	Time Width Height	Rank
Rytis Sakalauskas	100 metres			10.42	24	Did not advance			
Tadas Šuškevičius	50 kilometres walk							DSQ	
Povilas Mykolaitis	Long jump	NM						Did not advance	
Raivydas Stanys	High jump	2.25	20					Did not advance	
Virgilijus Alekna	Discus throw	64.21	6					64.09	6

Decathlon

Darius Draudvila	Decathlon			
Darius Draudvila	Event	Results	Points	Rank
	100 m	10.90	883	13
	Long jump	7.19	859	19
	Shot put	14.81	778	12
	High jump	1.96	767	17
	400 m	50.55	789	20
	110 m hurdles	14.93	858	23
	Discus throw	NM	0	
	Pole vault	DNS		
	Javelin throw	DNS		
	1500 m			
Total			DNF	

=== Women ===
Athlete	Event	Preliminaries		Heats		Semifinals		Final	
Athlete	Event	Time Width Height	Rank	Time Width Height	Rank	Time Width Height	Rank	Time Width Height	Rank
Eglė Balčiūnaitė	800 metres			2:02.88	26	Did not advance			
Diana Lobačevskė	Marathon							2:36:05 (SB)	25
Sonata Tamošaitytė	100 m hurdles			13.28	25	Did not advance			
Kristina Saltanovič	20 kilometres walk							1:31:40 SB	8
Brigita Virbalytė-Dimšienė	20 kilometres walk							1:38:39	29
Neringa Aidietytė	20 kilometres walk							DSQ	
Zinaida Sendriūtė	Discus throw	61.72 q	7					57.30	12
Indrė Jakubaitytė	Javelin throw	56.92	22					Did not advance	

Heptathlon

Austra Skujytė	Heptathlon			
Austra Skujytė	Event	Results	Points	Rank
	100 m hurdles	13.96 PB	984	23
	High jump	1.86	1054	2
	Shot put	16.71	976	1
	200 m	26.04	794	25
	Long jump	6.05	865	18
	Javelin throw	49.19 SB	844	6
	800 m	2:23.21	780	23
Total			6297	8
