= Domantas Stankūnas =

Lithuanian rower (born 2000)

Personal information
- Nationality: Lithuanian
- Born: 10 June 2000 (age 26)

Sport
- Sport: Rowing
- Event: Coxless pair
Medal record
Representing Lithuania
European Championships
Silver medal – second place	2026 Varese	Coxless pair
World University Games
Gold medal – first place	2025 Rhine-Ruhr	Coxless pair

Domantas Stankūnas (born 10 June 2000) is a Lithuanian rower. He placed eighth overall at the 2024 Summer Olympics in the men’s coxless pair, rowing alongside his twin brother Dovydas Stankūnas. They had previously won the coxless pair gold medal at the 2021 and 2022 European Rowing U23 Championships, and the silver medal in the coxless pair at the 2022 World Rowing U23 Championships.

== Early and personal life ==
His twin brother Dovydas Stankūnas is also a rower.

== Career ==
He won the silver medal at the 2021 World Rowing U23 Championships in the coxless pair, held in Račice, Czech Republic, competing in a boat alongside his twin brother Dovydas Stankūnas. That year, the pair won the gold medal at the 2021 European Rowing U23 Championships in Kruszwica, Poland.

They won the silver medal in the coxless pair at the 2022 World Rowing U23 Championships in Varese, Italy. They retained their European title at the 2022 European Rowing U23 Championships in Hazewinkel, in Heindonk, Belgium, in September 2022.

In May 2024, they qualified for the Paris Olympics at the qualifying regatta in Lucerne, Switzerland. They competed at the subsequent 2024 Olympic Games in Paris, France, in the Men's coxless pair, where they reached the semi-finals. In their semi-final they finished in fifth place, 2.68 seconds behind the top three, a result which was not enough to advance to the A final. They did however, go on to finish in second place in the B final behind the New Zealand boat in a time of 6:25.94 minutes, to finish in eighth place overall at the Games.
