= Loreta Kančytė =

Lithuanian long-distance runner (born 1994)

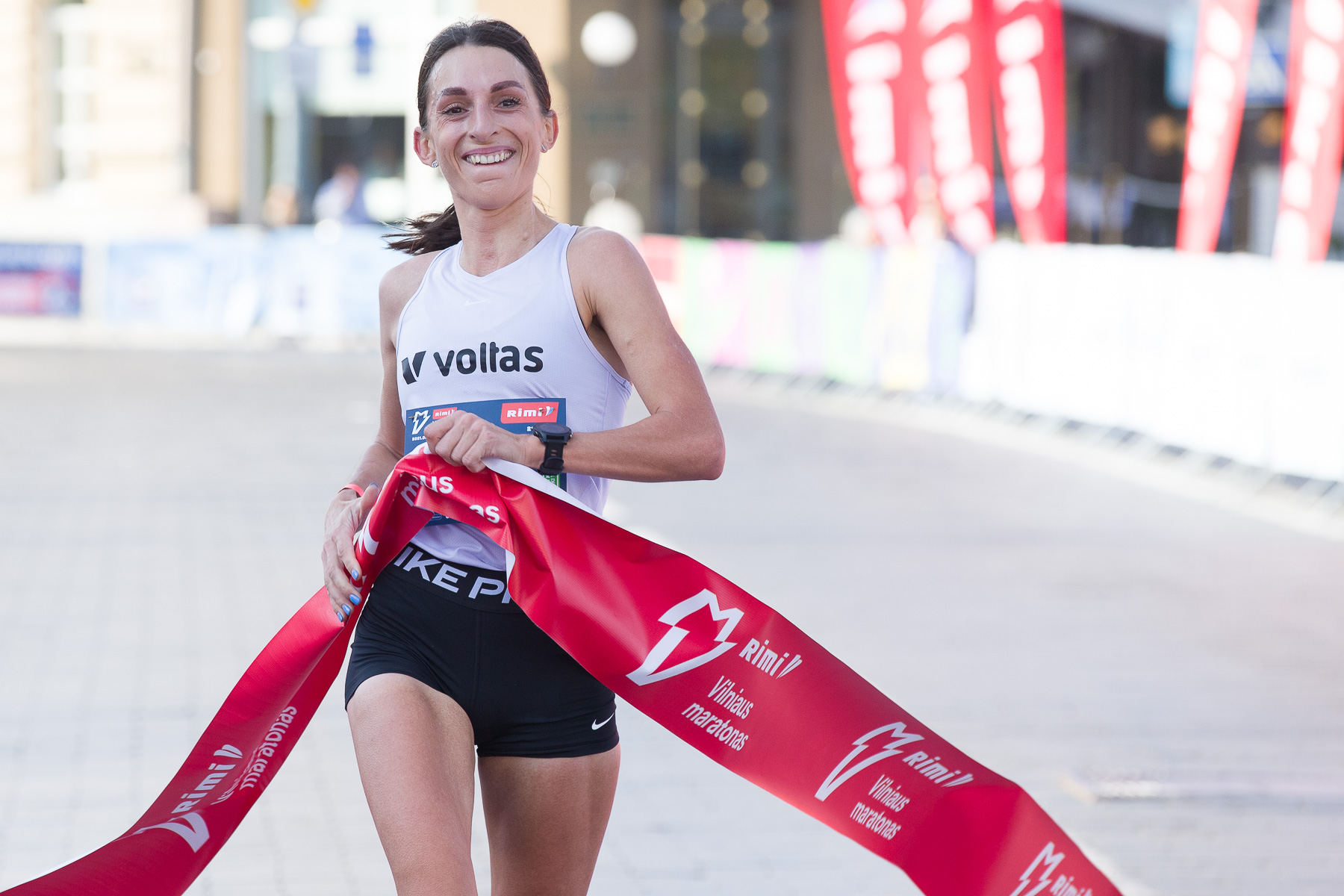

Personal information
- Born: 20 July 1994 (age 31)

Sport
- Country: Lithuania
- Sport: Long-distance running

Loreta Kančytė (born 20 July 1994) is a Lithuanian long-distance runner. In 2020, she competed in the women's half marathon at the 2020 World Athletics Half Marathon Championships held in Gdynia, Poland.

In 2020, she won the silver medal in the women's 10,000 metre event at the 2020 Lithuanian Athletics Championships held in Palanga, Lithuania.
