= Remigijus Kančys =

Lithuanian long-distance runner (born 1987)

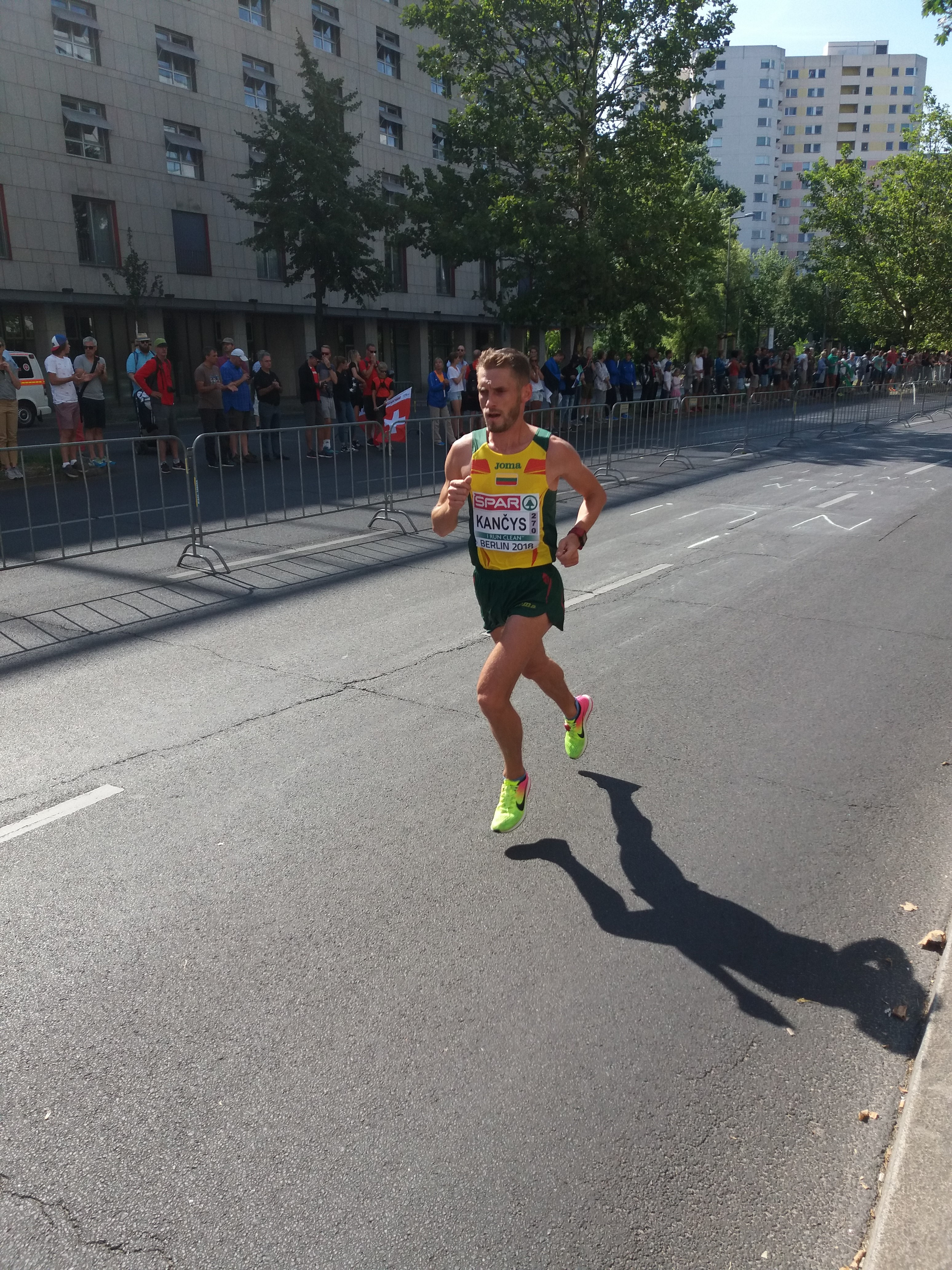
- Kančys during the 2018 European Championships marathon.

Personal information
- Born: July 17, 1987 (age 38)

Sport
- Country: Lithuania
- Sport: Athletics
- Event: Marathon

Remigijus Kančys (born 17 July 1987) is a marathon runner who competes internationally for Lithuania.

In 2015 he broke his personal record and was selected to represent Lithuania in 2016 Summer Olympics. In 2017 Kancys participated in the World Championships in Athletics held in London, placing 24th in the marathon event with a time of 2:16:34. In 2018, he competed in the men's marathon at the 2018 European Athletics Championships held in Berlin, Germany. He finished in 26th place.

== Personal bests ==
Event	Result	Year	Place
Marathon	2:13:12	2017	Hanover, Germany
