= Ignas Brasevičius =

Lithuanian long-distance runner (born 1984)

Personal information
- Nationality: Lithuanian
- Born: 21 September 1984 (age 41)

Sport
- Sport: Long-distance running
- Event: Marathon

Ignas Brasevičius (born 21 September 1984) is a Lithuanian long distance runner. He competed in the men's marathon at the 2017 World Championships in Athletics. In 2018, he competed in the men's marathon at the 2018 European Athletics Championships held in Berlin, Germany. He finished in 40th place. In 2020, he competed in the men's race at the 2020 World Athletics Half Marathon Championships held in Gdynia, Poland. In 2023 he won the Manchester Marathon in a time of 2:16:27.
