= Arturas Mastianica =

Lithuanian racewalker (born 1992)

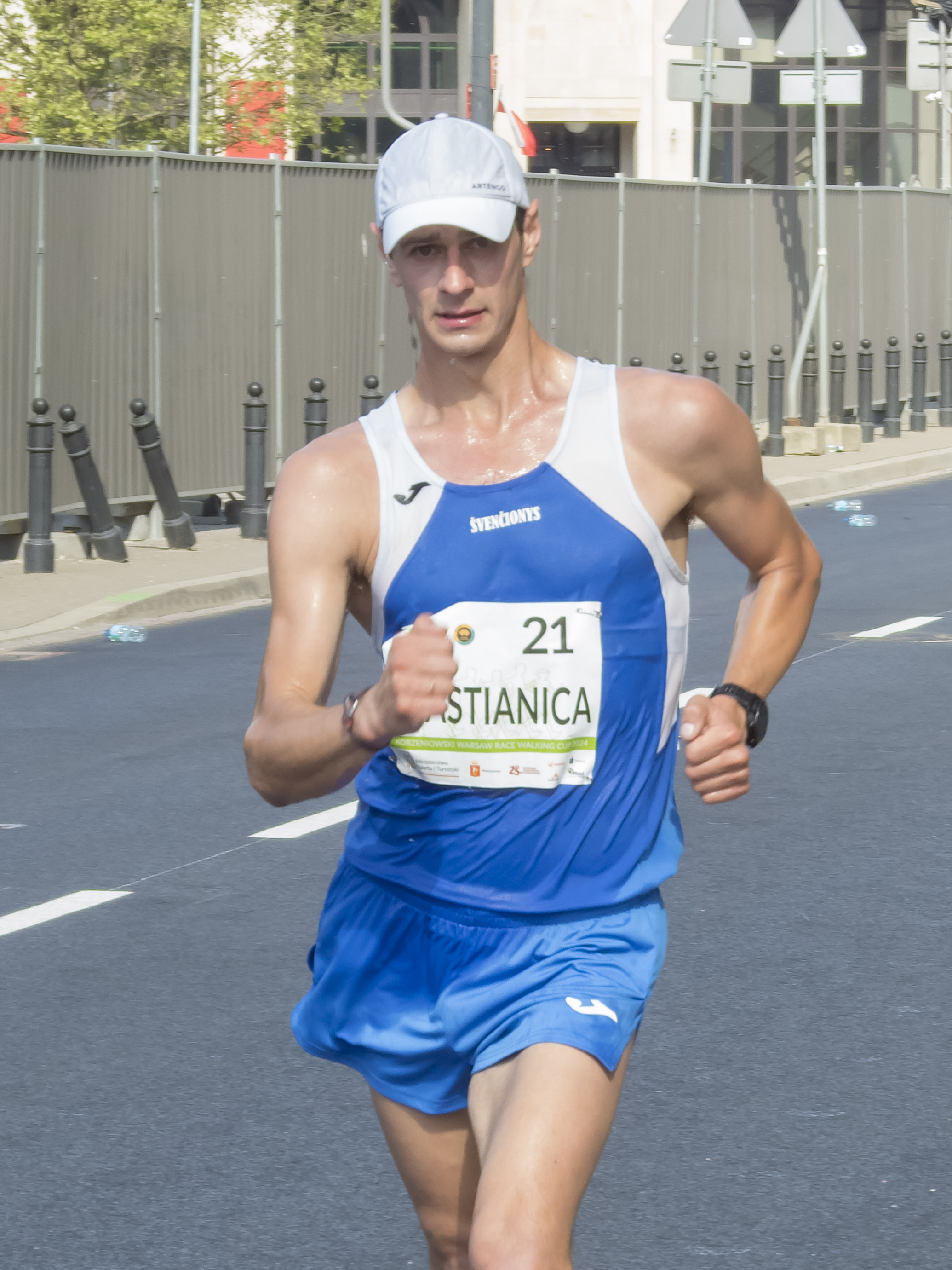
- Arturas Mastianica (Korzeniowski Warsaw Race Walking Cup 2024)

Personal information
- Born: July 30, 1992 (age 33)

Sport
- Country: Lithuania
- Sport: Athletics
- Event: 50km Race Walk

Artur "Arturas" Mastianica (born 30 July 1992) is a male professional race walker who competes internationally for Lithuania.

In 2016 he broke personal record and was selected to represent Lithuania in 2016 Summer Olympics. In 2021 Mastianica broke Lithuanian national record with 3:48:24.

== Personal bests ==
Event	Result	Year	Place
50 km racewalking	3:48:24	2021	Dudince, Slovakia
