= Gediminas Truskauskas =

Lithuanian sprinter (born 1998)

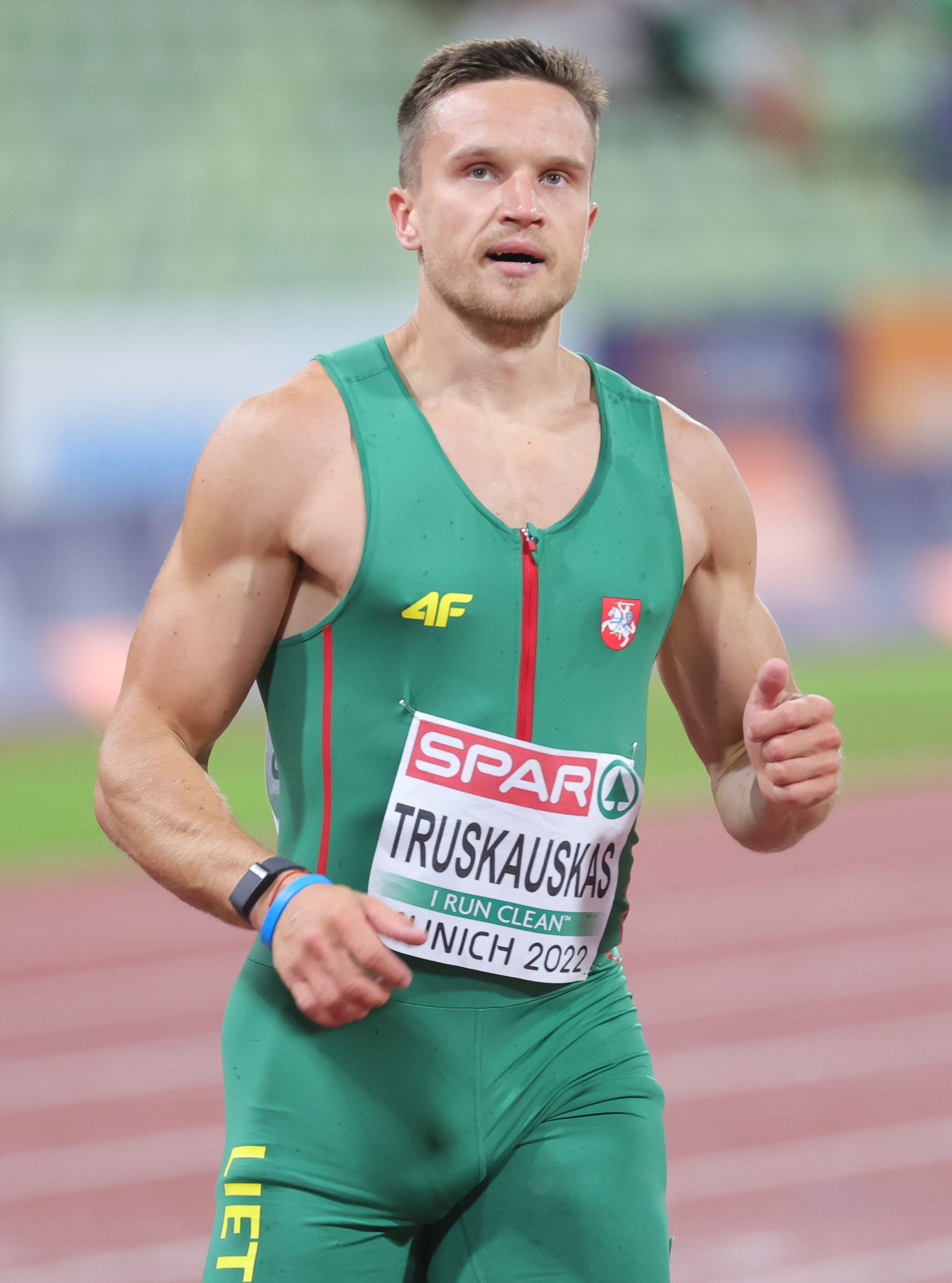
- Gediminas Truskauskas in Munich, 2022

Personal information
- Nationality: Lithuanian
- Born: 2 January 1998 (age 28) Vilnius, Lithuania

Sport
- Country: Lithuania
- Sport: Track and field
- Event(s): 100m, 200m
- Club: Cosma

Achievements and titles
- Personal best: 200m Outdoor: 20.48 NR

Gediminas Truskauskas (born 2 January 1998) is a Lithuanian sprinter, who specializes in the 200m. He ran his personal best and a national record of 20.48 at Eisenstadt on the 9th of June 2021.

Gediminas Truskauskas qualified for the 2020 Olympics via world rankings.

== Achievements ==
Year	Competition	Venue	Position	Notes
Representing Lithuania
2018	European Championships	Berlin, Germany	20	21.11
2021	European Indoor Championships	Toruń, Poland	47	6.80
