= Marius Žiūkas =

Lithuanian racewalker (born 1985)

Personal information
- Born: 29 June 1985 (age 41) Prienai, Lithuania
- Height: 1.84 m (6 ft 1/2 in)
- Weight: 72 kg (159 lb)

Sport
- Country: Lithuania
- Sport: Athletics
- Event: 20km Race Walk

Marius Žiūkas (born 29 June 1985 in Prienai) is a race-walker who competes internationally for Lithuania.

He finished 35th in the 20 km walk at the 2008 Olympics in Beijing. At the 2012 International Road Walking Festival in Alytus, Lithuania he won the 20 km race, finishing in front of Arnis Rumbenieks. Žiūkas finished 40th in 2012 Olympics and 26th in 2016 Olympics. During 2019 World Athletics Championships he competed in 20km distance and finished in 11th place.

From 1 June 2020 to 30 November 2020 Žiūkas is appointed as a head of Seimas functional office.

== Personal bests ==
Event	Result	Year	Place
10 km walk	39:47	2014	Druskininkai, Lithuania
20 km walk	1:20:31	2018	Adelaide, Australia
