= Modesta Justė Morauskaitė =

Lithuanian sprinter (born 1995)

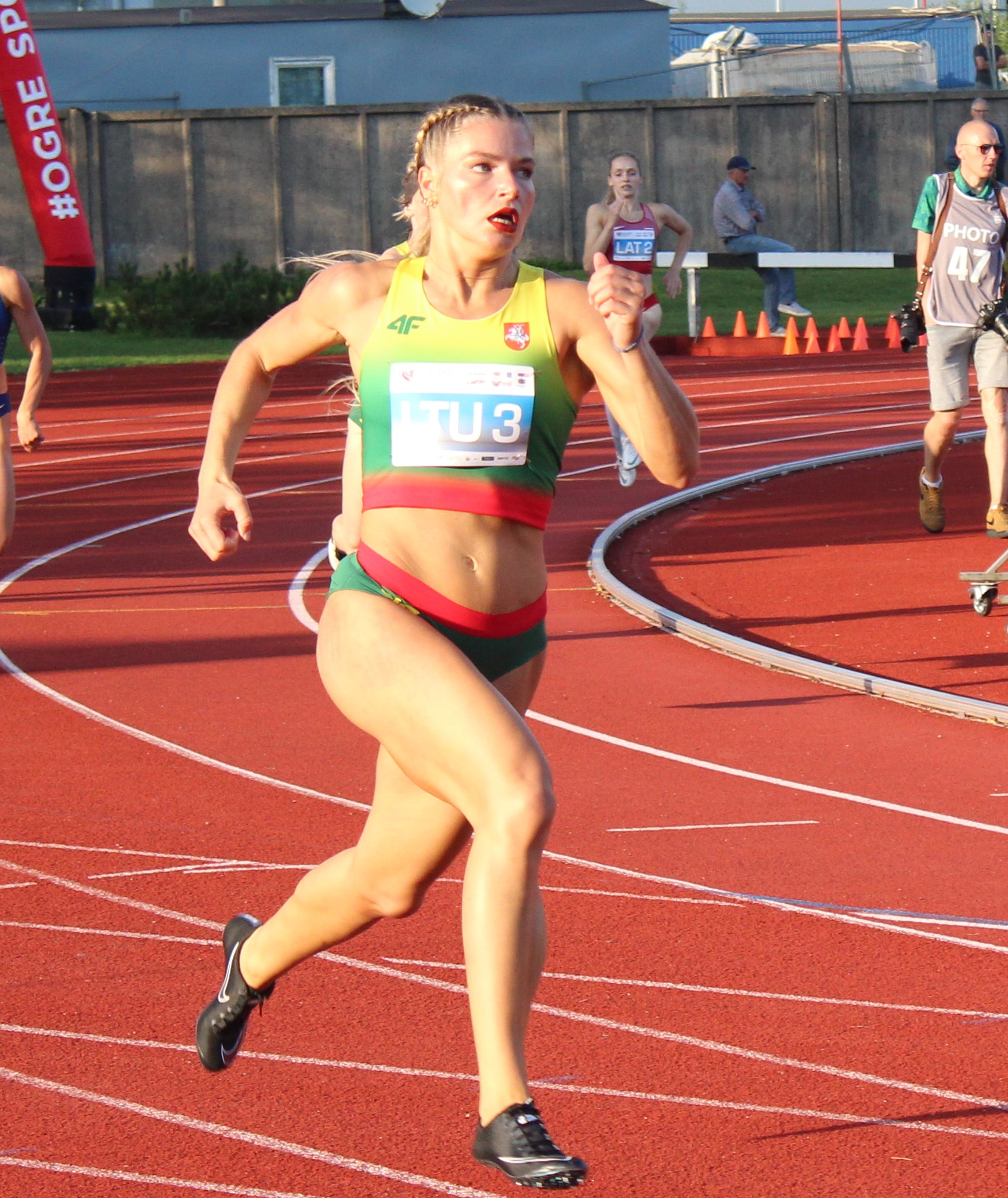
- Morauskaitė in 2020

Personal information
- Nationality: Lithuanian
- Born: 2 October 1995 (age 31) Vilnius, Lithuania

Sport
- Sport: Athletics, Snowboarding

Modesta Justė Morauskaitė (born 2 October 1995) is a Lithuanian sprinter, who specialises in the 400 metres and competed at the 2024 Olympic Games. She also competed at an international level as a junior snowboarder.

== Snowboarding career ==
In 2011 she became the first Lithuanian national champion in Snowboarding Cross event at Lithuanian Snowboarding Championships. She participated in FIS Junior Snowboarding Championships in Italy in 2011, and also competed at the same championships in Spain in 2012 and in 2013 in Turkey.

== Athletics career ==
In 2014 Morauskaitė competed at the 2014 European Athletics Championships, where she ran 55.85 seconds in the individual 400m event. She also placed 11th with the Lithuanian women's team in 4 × 400 m relay at the championships as they ran a time of 3:36.25.

Competing at the IAAF World Indoor Tour competition held in Madrid in February 2018, she ran the 400 m distance in 53.21 seconds and improved the Lithuanian record held previously by Eglė Balčiūnaitė. However, her record was broken just nine days later by Agnė Šerkšnienė who ran 52.93 seconds in Switzerland.

She set a new Lithuanian national indoor record again when she ran the 400m in 52.02 seconds at the Ciudad de Valencia competition held in Valencia, Spain, on February 2, 2022.

In June 2023, she competed for Lithuania at the 2023 European Athletics Team Championships in Silesia, Poland running 51.61 seconds in the individual 400 metres. She subsequently competed at the 2023 World Athletics Championships in Budapest, Hungary winning her heat in 51.05 seconds and racing in the semi-finals but did not qualify for the final.

She ran in the semi-finals of the 400 metres at the 2024 European Athletics Championships in Rome, Italy in June 2024. She ran 51.33 seconds to finish fourth in the repechage round for the 400 metres at the 2024 Olympic Games in Paris, France.

In January 2025, at the World Athletics Continental Bronze Tour in Jyväskylä, Finland, she ran the 300 meters in 37.62 seconds, breaking the national record for the infrequently run event that had stood since 2008, by 0.49 seconds.
