= Athletics at the 2024 Summer Olympics – Women's discus throw =

Women's discus throw at the Games of the XXXIII Olympiad
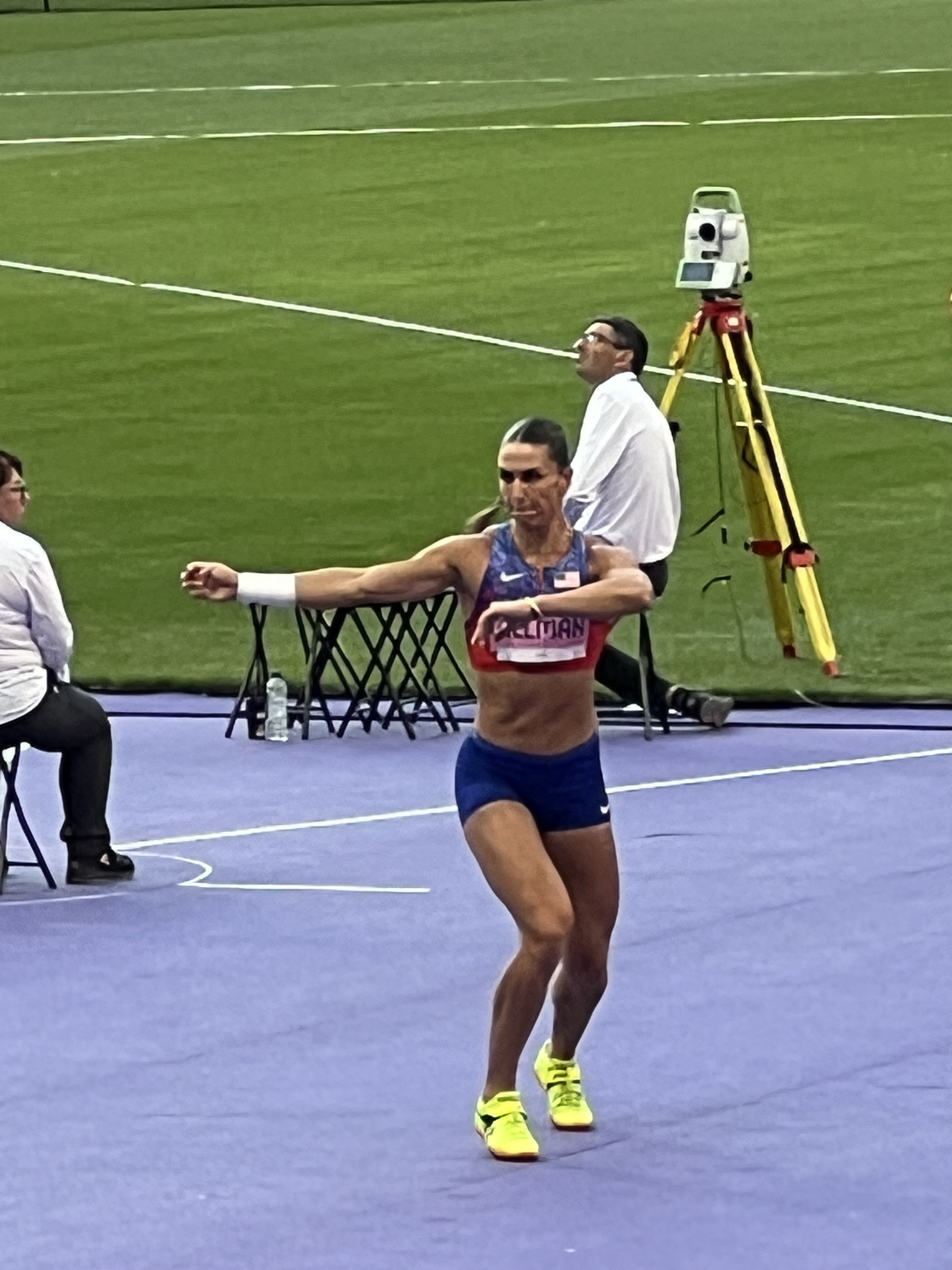
- Gold medalist Valarie Allman
- Venue: Stade de France, Paris, France
- Date: 2 August 2024 (qualification) 5 August 2024 (final)
- Competitors: 32 from 19 nations
- Winning distance: 69.50 m

Medalists
1st place, gold medalist(s)		Valarie Allman	United States
2nd place, silver medalist(s)		Feng Bin	China
3rd place, bronze medalist(s)		Sandra Elkasević	Croatia

The women's discus throw at the 2024 Summer Olympics was held in Paris, France, on 2 and 5 August 2024. This was the 23rd time that the event is contested at the Summer Olympics.

== Summary ==
Valarie Allman won the previous Olympics on her first throw. Since then Feng Bin won the 2022 World Championships, with 2012 and 2016 champion Sandra Perković pushing Allman to bronze. After marrying her coach in 2023, she now goes by Elkasević. In 2023, Laulauga Tausaga pushed Allman to silver, but Tausaga couldn't land a fair throw at the US Trials and was not here. 2019 World Champion Yaime Pérez was also the 2024 world leader but after defecting to the United States was not eligible to compete.

In the first round of the final, Elkasević started with 64.25m. Vanessa Kamga moved ahead with 65.05m. Feng capped of the round with 66.33m. Allman took the lead in the second round with 68.74m. In the third round, Elkasević tossed 67.51m, matched exactly at the end of the round by Feng. Because Feng had the superior second best throw, she held second place. In the fourth round, Allman improved to 69.50 m (228 ft 0 in). That proved to be the winner as only Marike Steinacker was able to improve to 65.37m, good enough for fourth place in the final rounds. With the tiebreaker remaining, Feng took silver and Elkasević the bronze.

== Background ==
The women's discus throw has been present on the Olympic athletics programme since 1928.

Global records before the 2024 Summer Olympics
Record	Athlete (Nation)	Distance (m)	Location	Date
World record	Gabriele Reinsch (GDR)	76.80	Neubrandenburg, East Germany	9 July 1988
Olympic record	Martina Hellmann (GDR)	72.30	Seoul, South Korea	29 September 1988
World leading	Yaime Pérez (CUB)	73.09	Ramona, United States	13 April 2024

Area records before the 2024 Summer Olympics
Area Record	Athlete (Nation)	Distance (m)
Africa (records)	Chioma Onyekwere (NGR)	64.96
Asia (records)	Xiao Yanling (CHN)	71.68
Europe (records)	Gabriele Reinsch (GDR)	76.80 WR
North, Central America and Caribbean (records)	Yaime Pérez (CUB)	73.09
Oceania (records)	Dani Stevens (AUS)	69.64
South America (records)	Andressa de Morais (BRA)	65.34

== Qualification ==
For the women's discus throw event, the qualification period was between 1 July 2023 and 30 June 2024. 32 athletes were able to qualify for the event, with a maximum of three athletes per nation, by throwing the entry standard of 64.50 m or further or by their World Athletics Ranking for this event.

== Results ==
=== Qualification ===
The qualification was held on 2 August, starting at 18:55 (UTC+2) for Group A and 20:20 (UTC+2) for Group B in the evening. 32 athletes qualified for the first round by qualification distance or world ranking. Qualification: 64.00 (Q) or at least 12 best performers (q) advance to the final.

Rank	Group	Athlete	Nation	1	2	3	Distance	Notes
1	A	Valarie Allman	United States	69.59			69.59	Q
2	B	Sandra Elkasević	Croatia	65.63			65.63	Q
3	B	Feng Bin	China	65.40			65.40	Q
4	B	Vanessa Kamga	Sweden	65.14			65.14	Q, NR
5	A	Jorinde van Klinken	Netherlands	63.68	64.81		64.81	Q
6	B	Alexandra Emilianov	Moldova	64.33			64.33	Q
7	A	Mélina Robert-Michon	France	63.77	62.13	59.29	63.77	q, SB
8	A	Kristin Pudenz	Germany	x	63.45	63.35	63.45	q
9	A	Daisy Osakue	Italy	56.77	63.11	x	63.11	q
10	B	Irina Rodrigues	Portugal	62.90	60.45	x	62.90	q
11	B	Claudine Vita	Germany	59.77	62.25	62.70	62.70	q
12	B	Marike Steinacker	Germany	62.63	x	x	62.63	q
13	B	Veronica Fraley	United States	62.54	62.30	60.95	62.54	
14	A	Liliana Cá	Portugal	57.59	62.43	59.55	62.43	
15	B	Taryn Gollshewsky	Australia	56.86	62.36	58.79	62.36	PB
16	B	Alida van Daalen	Netherlands	62.19	61.62	61.99	62.19	
17	B	Izabela da Silva	Brazil	61.68	x	61.21	61.68	
18	B	Jayden Ulrich	United States	x	x	61.08	61.08	
19	B	Melany del Pilar Matheus	Cuba	60.19	61.07	60.90	61.07	
20	B	Daria Zabawska	Poland	57.84	60.48	60.86	60.86	
21	B	Chioma Onyekwere	Nigeria	60.78	60.66	x	60.78	
22	A	Ieva Gumbs	Lithuania	x	60.37	56.88	60.37	
23	A	Marija Tolj	Croatia	59.87	59.27	x	59.87	
24	A	Lisa Brix Pedersen	Denmark	59.81	x	57.75	59.81	SB
25	A	Silinda Moráles	Cuba	59.46	58.30	55.20	59.46	
26	A	Andressa de Morais	Brazil	52.24	59.14	59.43	59.43	
27	A	Caisa-Marie Lindfors	Sweden	56.82	x	59.29	59.29	
28	A	Jiang Zhichao	China	56.58	57.13	59.10	59.10	
29	A	Ashley Anumba	Nigeria	57.23	x	58.83	58.83	
30	A	Subenrat Insaeng	Thailand	58.07	x	x	58.07	
31	A	Samantha Hall	Jamaica	x	54.94	x	54.94	
32	B	Obiageri Amaechi	Nigeria	x	x	45.45	45.45	

=== Final ===
The final was held on 5 August, starting at 20:30 (UTC+2) in the evening.

Rank	Athlete	Nation	1	2	3	4	5	6	Distance	Notes
1st place, gold medalist(s)	Valarie Allman	United States	x	68.74	68.06	69.50	x	69.21	69.50	
2nd place, silver medalist(s)	Feng Bin	China	66.33	64.80	67.51	67.13	67.25	65.98	67.51	
3rd place, bronze medalist(s)	Sandra Elkasević	Croatia	64.25	x	67.51	x	x	x	67.51	SB
4	Marike Steinacker	Germany	54.37	61.37	x	x	65.37	x	65.37	
5	Vanessa Kamga	Sweden	65.05	x	x	62.32	x	x	65.05	
6	Claudine Vita	Germany	63.62	x	63.25	x	61.25	63.03	63.62	
7	Jorinde van Klinken	Netherlands	63.35	61.50	x	x	x	51.23	63.35	
8	Daisy Osakue	Italy	63.11	x	x	x	62.53	60.31	63.11	
9	Irina Rodrigues	Portugal	60.39	61.19	x	did not advance			61.19	
10	Kristin Pudenz	Germany	60.38	60.07	x	did not advance			60.38	
11	Alexandra Emilianov	Moldova	58.08	x	58.02	did not advance			58.08	
12	Mélina Robert-Michon	France	56.63	x	57.03	did not advance			57.03	
