= 2025 World Athletics Championships – Women's discus throw =

Women's discus throw at the 2025 World Athletics Championships
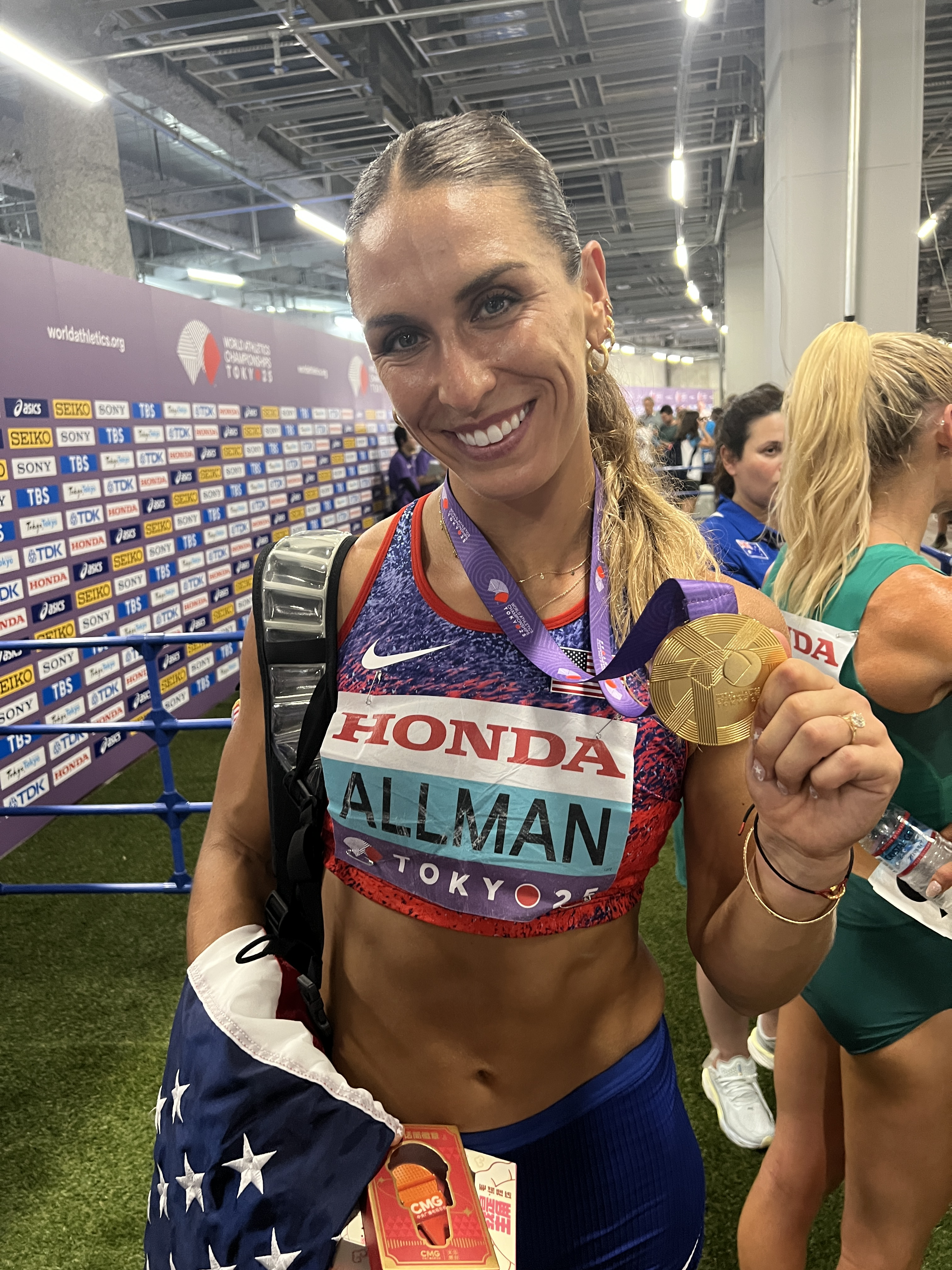
- Winner Valarie Allman celebrates with her gold medal at the 2025 World Athletics Championships in Tokyo, Japan.
- Venue: National Stadium
- Location: Tokyo, Japan
- Dates: 13 (qualification); 14 September (final)
- Competitors: 37 from 23 nations
- Winning distance: 69.48 m

Medalists
gold medal	Valarie Allman	United States
silver medal	Jorinde van Klinken	Netherlands
bronze medal	Silinda Morales	Cuba

The women's discus throw at the 2025 World Athletics Championships was held at the National Stadium in Tokyo on 13 and 14 September 2025. It was won by Valarie Allman of the United States.

== Summary ==
Laulauga Tausaga returns as the defending champion, but world leader Valarie Allman seemed like the odds on favorite. No rational person would expect a mark like the 73.52 m she threw in the wind tunnel of Ramona, but she has won two Olympic Gold medals in stadiums. Yaimé Pérez remains ineligible after defecting to the US, Sandra Elkasević, formerly Perković, also with two Olympic golds, is now 35. The Olympic silver medalist and 2023 bronze medalist behind Allman is Feng Bin.

In the qualifying round, Allman, Feng and Jorinde van Klinken auto qualified on their first attempt. Elkasević fouled her first and got it on her second. Tausaga got over 64m on her third.

On the first throw of the final, Allman threw 67.63m. The next thrower was van Klinken. Her 67.50m was as close as anyone would come. Silinda Morales was in third place after the first round with a 65.11 m. In the second round, Tausaga moved into third with a 65.22 m. That lasted two throws until Vanessa Kamga threw a 65.46 m. Morales came back in the third round to settle her hold on the bronze medal with her personal best of 67.25 m. Over the next three rounds, only one of the leaders would improve, that would be the fifth round when Allman launched at 69.48 m to leave no doubt. In the final round, Kamga set a Swedish national record 66.61 m.

== Records ==
Before the competition records were as follows:

Record	Athlete & Nat.	Perf.	Location	Date
World Record	Gabriele Reinsch (GDR)	76.80 m	Neubrandenburg, East Germany	9 July 1988
Championship Record	Martina Hellmann (GDR)	71.62 m	Rome, Italy	31 August 1987
World Leading	Valarie Allman (USA)	73.52 m	Ramona, United States	12 April 2025
African Record	Chioma Onyekwere (NGR)	64.96 m	Ramona, United States	15 April 2023
Asian Record	Xiao Yanling (CHN)	71.68 m	Beijing, China	14 March 1992
European Record	Gabriele Reinsch (GDR)	76.80 m	Neubrandenburg, East Germany	9 July 1988
North, Central American and Caribbean Record	Valarie Allman (USA)	73.52 m	Ramona, United States	12 April 2025
Oceanian Record	Dani Stevens (AUS)	69.64 m	London, Great Britain	13 August 2017
South American Record	Andressa de Morais (BRA)	65.34 m	Leiria, Portugal	26 June 2019

== Qualification standard ==
The standard to qualify automatically for entry was 64.50 m.

== Schedule ==
The event schedule, in local time (UTC+9), is as follows:

Date	Time	Round
13 September	09:00	Qualification
14 September	19:12	Final

== Results ==
=== Qualification ===
All athletes over 64.00 m ( Q ) or at least the 12 best performers ( q ) advanced to the final.

==== Group A ====
Place	Athlete	Nation	Round			Mark	Notes
Place	Athlete	Nation	1	2	3	Mark	Notes
1	Sandra Elkasević	Croatia	x	66.72		66.72 m	Q
2	Feng Bin	China	65.52			65.52 m	Q, SB
3	Laulauga Tausaga	United States	61.31	60.98	64.99	64.99 m	Q
4	Izabela da Silva	Brazil	54.93	63.75	x	63.75 m	q, SB
5	Alida van Daalen	Netherlands	50.84	62.65	61.76	62.65 m	q
6	Kristin Pudenz	Germany	62.02	x	x	62.02 m	
7	Mélina Robert-Michon	France	55.36	61.24	x	61.24 m	
8	Gabi Jacobs	United States	x	59.70	x	59.70 m	
9	Irina Rodrigues	Portugal	59.10	59.23	x	59.23 m	
10	Daisy Osakue	Italy	57.58	x	58.56	58.56 m	
11	Caisa-Marie Lindfors	Sweden	56.69	58.06	57.31	58.06 m	
12	Subenrat Insaeng	Thailand	58.01	x	x	58.01 m	
13	Daria Zabawska	Poland	56.85	57.78	x	57.78 m	
14	Marike Steinacker	Germany	53.61	57.43	54.98	57.43 m	
15	Nora Monie	Cameroon	55.69	55.17	54.05	55.69 m	
16	Obiageri Amaechi	Nigeria	55.69	48.82	47.99	55.69 m	
17	Taryn Gollshewsky	Australia	53.74	54.63	55.40	55.40 m	
18	Melany del Pilar Matheus	Cuba	54.98	x	x	54.98 m	

==== Group B ====
Place	Athlete	Nation	Round			Mark	Notes
Place	Athlete	Nation	1	2	3	Mark	Notes
1	Jorinde van Klinken	Netherlands	66.39			66.39 m	Q
2	Valarie Allman	United States	66.07			66.07 m	Q
3	Shanice Craft	Germany	63.51	61.68	60.52	63.51 m	q
4	Vanessa Kamga	Sweden	48.21	58.19	63.50	63.50 m	q
5	Alexandra Emilianov	Moldova	62.33	x	63.46 m	63.46 m	q, SB
6	Samantha Hall	Jamaica	x	60.20	63.32	63.32 m	q
7	Silinda Morales	Cuba	63.22	x	63.01	63.22 m	q
8	Marija Tolj	Croatia	61.80	x	x	61.80 m	
9	Liliana Cá	Portugal	59.79	x	x	59.79 m	
10	Jiang Zhichao	China	59.71	x	59.05	59.71 m	
11	Julia Tunks	Canada	56.97	57.19	59.61	59.61 m	
12	Chioma Onyekwere	Nigeria	59.45	x	x	59.45 m	
13	Ieva Gumbs	Lithuania	x	58.97	x	58.97 m	
14	Shelby Frank	United States	x	57.46	58.90	58.90 m	
15	Lisa Brix Pedersen	Denmark	x	56.79	58.52	58.52 m	
16	Amanda Ngandu-Ntumba	France	46.13	48.17	57.60	57.60 m	
17	Özlem Becerek	Turkey	x	57.20	55.29	57.20 m	
18	Nanaka Kori	Japan	54.59	x	54.21	54.59 m	
19	Andressa de Morais	Brazil	52.99	52.39	x	52.99 m	

=== Final ===
Place	Athlete	Nation	Round						Mark	Notes
Place	Athlete	Nation	#1	#2	#3	#4	#5	#6	Mark	Notes
1st place, gold medalist(s)	Valarie Allman	United States	67.63	63.79	66.49	x	69.48	x	69.48 m	
2nd place, silver medalist(s)	Jorinde van Klinken	Netherlands	67.50	63.95	66.69	x	29.88	66.44	67.50 m	SB
3rd place, bronze medalist(s)	Silinda Morales	Cuba	65.11	x	67.25	63.57	62.52	61.42	67.25 m	PB
4	Vanessa Kamga	Sweden	x	65.46	61.56	x	65.95	66.61	66.61 m	NR
5	Sandra Elkasević	Croatia	64.78	x	x	65.82	64.55	64.80	65.82 m	
6	Laulauga Tausaga	United States	57.64	62.22	65.49	61.77	x	62.09	65.49 m	
7	Feng Bin	China	64.54	65.18	65.01	x	65.28		65.28 m	
8	Shanice Craft	Germany	58.89	58.12	65.21	63.20	61.30		65.21 m	
9	Izabela da Silva	Brazil	63.22	x	61.75	x			63.22 m	
10	Alexandra Emilianov	Moldova	60.80	59.65	62.59	62.34			62.59 m	
11	Alida van Daalen	Netherlands	57.30	61.29	62.24				62.24 m	
12	Samantha Hall	Jamaica	60.69	x	57.90				60.69 m	
