= Croatia at the 2025 World Athletics Championships =

- Flag of Croatia
- WA code: CRO

in Tokyo, Japan 13 September 2025 – 21 September 2025
- Competitors: 8 (4 men and 4 women)
- Medals: Gold 0 Silver 0 Bronze 0 Total 0

World Athletics Championships appearances
- 1993; 1995; 1997; 1999; 2001; 2003; 2005; 2007; 2009; 2011; 2013; 2015; 2017; 2019; 2022; 2023; 2025

Other related appearances
- Yugoslavia (1983–1991)

Croatia competed at the 2025 World Athletics Championships in Tokyo, Japan, from 13 to 21 September 2025.

== Results ==
Croatia entered 8 athletes to the championships: 4 women and 4 men.

Key

- Q = Qualified for the next round
- q = Qualified for the next round as a fastest loser or, in field events, by position without achieving the qualifying target
- NR = National record
- PB = Personal best
- SB = Season best
- N/A = Round not applicable for the event

=== Men ===
Track and road events

Athlete	Event	Heat		Semifinal		Final	
Athlete	Event	Result	Rank	Result	Rank	Result	Rank
Marino Bloudek	800 metres	1:44.78	3 Q	1:44.33	7	Did not advance	

Field events

Athlete	Event	Qualification		Final	
Athlete	Event	Distance	Position	Distance	Position
Roko Farkaš	Long jump	7.92 SB	18	Did not advance	
Filip Pravdica	Long jump	7.49	35	Did not advance	
Matija Gregurić	Hammer throw	74.66	18	Did not advance	

=== Women ===
Track and road events

Athlete	Event	Heat		Semifinal		Final	
Athlete	Event	Result	Rank	Result	Rank	Result	Rank
Veronika Drljačić	400 metres	52.67	7	Did not advance			

Field events

Athlete	Event	Qualification		Final	
Athlete	Event	Distance	Position	Distance	Position
Sandra Elkasević	Discus throw	66.72	1 Q	65.82	5
Marija Tolj	Discus throw	61.80	14	Did not advance	
Sara Kolak	Javelin throw	54.49	33	Did not advance	
