= Nigeria at the 2023 World Athletics Championships =

- Flag of Nigeria
- WA code: NGR

in Budapest, Hungary 19 August 2023 – 27 August 2023
- Competitors: 27 (11 men and 16 women)
- Medals: Gold 0 Silver 0 Bronze 0 Total 0

World Athletics Championships appearances
- 1983; 1987; 1991; 1993; 1995; 1997; 1999; 2001; 2003; 2005; 2007; 2009; 2011; 2013; 2015; 2017; 2019; 2022; 2023

Nigeria competed at the 2023 World Athletics Championships in Budapest, Hungary, from 19 to 27 August 2023.

== Results ==
Nigeria entered 27 athletes.

=== Men ===
Track and road events

Athlete	Event	Heat		Semifinal		Final	
Athlete	Event	Result	Rank	Result	Rank	Result	Rank
Favour Ashe	100 metres	DQ		Did not advance			
Usheoritse Itsekiri	100 metres	10.17	3 Q	10.19	8	Did not advance	
Seye Ogunlewe	100 metres	10.07	3 Q	10.12	5	Did not advance	
Alaba Akintola	200 metres	20.54	3 Q	20.75	7	Did not advance	
Dubem Nwachukwu	400 metres	45.60	6	Did not advance			
Ezekiel Nathaniel	400 metres hurdles	48.47 SB	4 Q	49.22	6	Did not advance	
Alaba Akintola; Favour Ashe; Usheoritse Itsekiri; Seye Ogunlewe	4 × 100 metres relay	38.20 SB	5	—		Did not advance	

Field events

Athlete	Event	Qualification		Final	
Athlete	Event	Distance	Position	Distance	Position
Chukwuebuka Enekwechi	Shot put	20.68	13	Did not advance	

=== Women ===
Track and road events

Athlete	Event	Heat		Semifinal		Final	
Athlete	Event	Result	Rank	Result	Rank	Result	Rank
Rosemary Chukwuma	100 metres	11.24	4 q	11.26	8	Did not advance	
Favour Ofili	200 metres	22.66	4 q	22.86	7	Did not advance	
Imaobong Nse Uko	400 metres	52.24	6	Did not advance			
Tobi Amusan	100 metres hurdles	12.48	1 Q	12.56	1 Q	12.62	6
Rosemary Chukwuma; Justina Eyakpobeyan; Favour Ofili; Faith Okwose	4 × 100 metres relay	DNF		—		Did not advance	
Patience Okon George; Opeyemi Deborah Oke; Ella Onojuvwevwo; Imaobong Nse Uko	4 × 400 metres relay	DQ		—		Did not advance	

Field events

Athlete	Event	Qualification		Final	
Athlete	Event	Distance	Position	Distance	Position
Ese Brume	Long Jump	6.72	8 q	6.84 SB	4
Ruth Usoro	Long Jump	6.60	13	Did not advance	
Obiageri Amaechi	Discus throw	51.60	37	Did not advance	
Ashley Anumba	Discus throw	57.77	25	Did not advance	
Chioma Onyekwere	Discus throw	58.58	21	Did not advance	
Oyesade Olatoye	Hammer throw	66.92	30	Did not advance	

=== Mixed ===
Athlete	Event	Heat		Final	
Athlete	Event	Result	Rank	Result	Rank
Patience Okon George; Dubem Nwachukwu; Ezekiel Nathaniel; Imaobong Nse Uko	4 × 400 metres relay	3:14.38 SB	12	Did not advance	
