= 2024 African Championships in Athletics – Women's discus throw =

Women's discus throw at the 2024 African Championships in Athletics
- Venue: Japoma Stadium
- Location: Douala, Cameroon
- Dates: 21 June
- Competitors: 15 from 9 nations
- Winning distance: 59.30 m

Medalists
gold medal	Ashley Anumba	Nigeria
silver medal	Obiageri Amaechi	Nigeria
bronze medal	Chioma Onyekwere	Nigeria

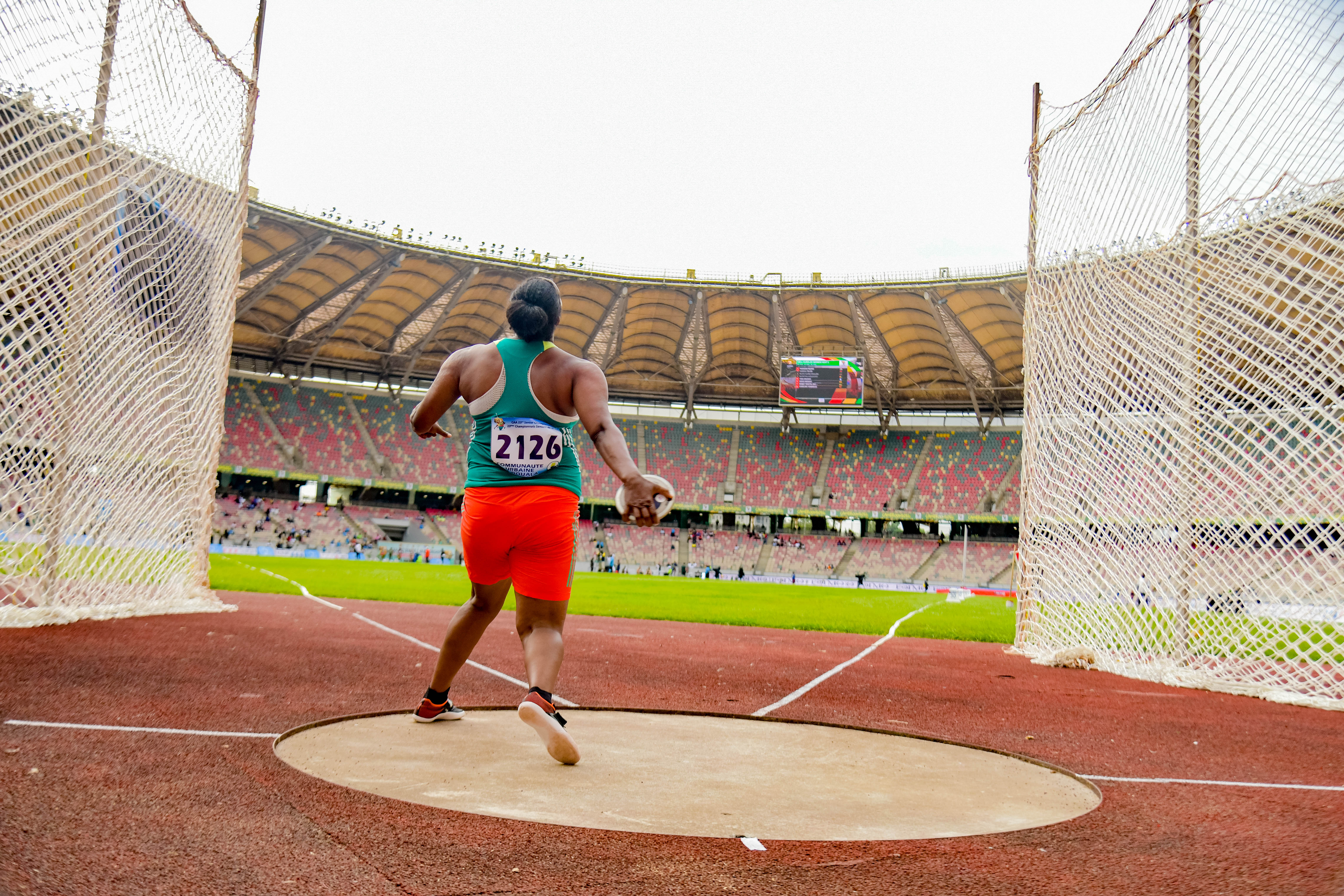
Ethiopia’s Athletes at the 2024 African Athletics Championships in Douala

The women's discus throw event at the 2024 African Championships in Athletics was held on 21 June in Douala, Cameroon.

== Records ==
Records before the 2024 African Athletics Championships
Record	Athlete (nation)	Distance (m)	Location	Date
World record	Gabriele Reinsch (GDR)	76.80	Neubrandenburg, East Germany	9 July 1988
African record	Vivian Chukwuemeka (NGR)	64.96	Ramona, United States	15 April 2003
Championship record	Chinwe Okoro (NGR)	59.79	Marrakesh, Morocco	12 August 2014
World leading	Yaime Pérez (CUB)	73.09	Ramona, United States	13 April 2024
African leading	Obiageri Amaechi (NGR)	63.17	Ramona, United States	19 May 2024

== Results ==
Rank	Athlete	Nationality	#1	#2	#3	#4	#5	#6	Result	Notes
1st place, gold medalist(s)	Ashley Anumba	Nigeria	x	55.30	59.01	57.61	56.07	59.30	59.30	
2nd place, silver medalist(s)	Obiageri Amaechi	Nigeria	54.55	55.73	58.80	54.80	55.33	56.57	58.80	
3rd place, bronze medalist(s)	Chioma Onyekwere	Nigeria	54.30	55.40	54.50	57.93	x	x	57.93	
4	Nora Monie	Cameroon	55.95	x	55.60	55.10	x	56.95	56.95	
~~5~~	Yelena Mokoka	Democratic Republic of the Congo	~~51.23~~	~~x~~	~~x~~	~~x~~	~~56.71~~	~~52.23~~	~~56.71~~	DQ
5	Colette Uys	South Africa	x	51.30	49.98	51.39	53.90	55.55	55.55	
6	Yolandi Stander	South Africa	53.75	x	47.55	52.70	53.34	53.20	53.75	
7	Jihane Mrabet	Morocco	35.96	45.95	48.38	46.26	x	45.62	48.38	
8	Caroline Cherotich	Kenya	x	x	47.36				47.36	
9	Alicia Khunou	South Africa	47.30	46.50	46.64				47.30	
10	Roselyn Nyachama Rakamba	Kenya	46.50	44.30	44.93				46.50	
11	Rejoice Agbewodie	Ghana	46.38	44.73	x				46.38	
12	Alemitu Teklesilassie	Ethiopia	42.05	40.53	39.86				42.05	
13	Nassira Koné	Mali	38.55	x	39.83				39.83	
14	Yenesew Yaregal	Ethiopia	38.90	39.45	39.38				39.45	
15	Merhawit Tsehaye	Ethiopia	38.00	37.23	x				38.00	

== See also ==
- Athletics at the 2023 African Games – Women's discus throw
