= 2023 World Athletics Championships – Women's discus throw =

Women's discus throw at the 2023 World Championships
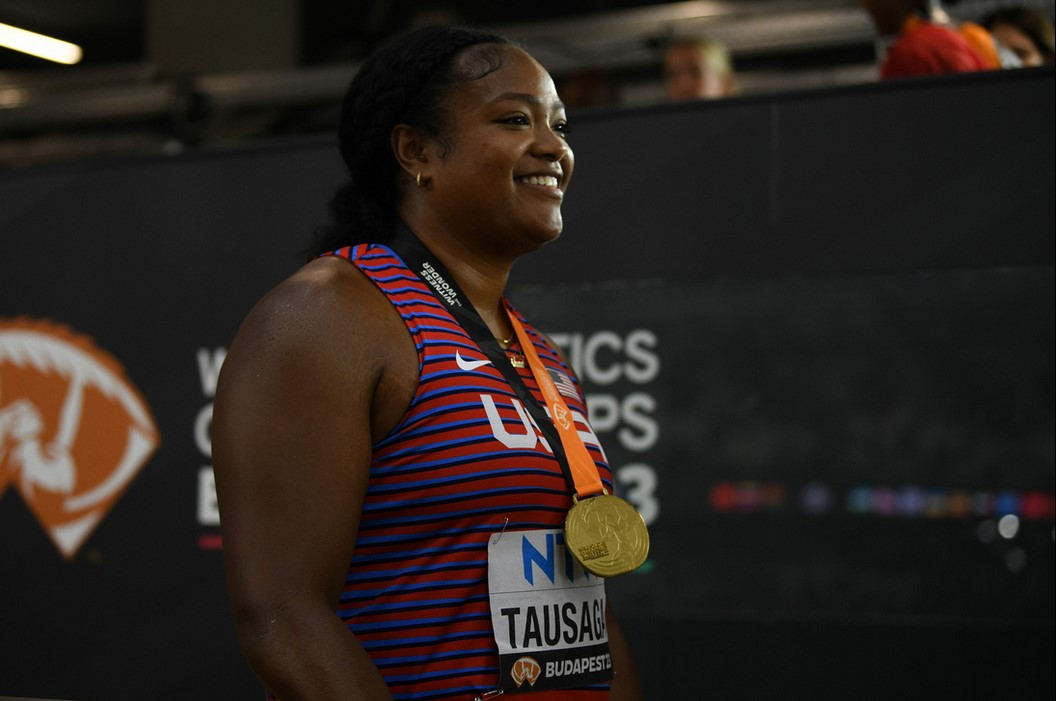
- Winner Laulauga Tausaga with her gold medal
- Venue: National Athletics Centre
- Dates: 20 August (qualification); 22 August (final)
- Competitors: 37 from 25 nations
- Winning distance: 69.49

Medalists
gold medal	Laulauga Tausaga	United States
silver medal	Valarie Allman	United States
bronze medal	Feng Bin	China

The women's discus throw at the 2023 World Athletics Championships was held at the National Athletics Centre in Budapest on 20 and 22 August 2023.

== Summary ==
Of the 12 finalists in Eugene, 10 of them returned to this year's finals. And those 10 were the top 10 from the preliminaries. The top 3 were the medalists.

In the first round of the finals Olympic Champion Valarie Allman got off a 68.57m to take the early lead. Defending champion Feng Bin responded with a 66.97m. Jorinde van Klinken held on to third place with a 63.93m. With her second attempt, two-time Olympic and two-time world champion Sandra Perković moved into the top 3 with a 66.57m. In the third round, Allman improved to 68.79m. She improved again to 69.23m in the fourth round. Bin also improved to 67.18m

At the end of the third round, Laulauga Tausaga had to throw a 65.56m personal best to leap from dead last 12th place into fifth place and a chance to make three more throws. She had needed to throw a personal best 65.46m as the final throw at her USA National Championships just to be eligible to come to these championships. On her newly earned fifth throw, she threw the winner 69.49 m (227 ft 11 in), a four metre (13 feet) improvement in her personal best over the course of three rounds.

van Klinken's fifth round throw of 67.20m edged her back into third place. Bin improved to 68.20m on her final attempt to move back into third place. Allman was unable to improve, so on a breakthrough night, the surprised and ecstatic Tausaga was able to step into the ring for her final attempt already confirmed as the champion. She then threw the second best throw of her career, 68.36m.

== Records ==
Before the competition records were as follows:

Record	Athlete & Nat.	Perf.	Location	Date
World record	Gabriele Reinsch (GDR)	76.80 m	Neubrandenburg, East Germany	9 July 1988
Championship record	Martina Hellmann (GDR)	71.62 m	Rome, Italy	31 August 1987
World Leading	Valarie Allman (USA)	70.25 m	San Diego, United States	7 April 2023
African Record	Chioma Onyekwere (NGR)	64.96 m	Ramona, United States	15 April 2023
Asian Record	Xiao Yanling (CHN)	71.68 m	Beijing, China	14 March 1992
North, Central American and Caribbean record	Valarie Allman (USA)	71.46 m	San Diego, United States	8 April 2022
South American Record	Andressa de Morais (BRA)	65.34 m	Leiria, Portugal	26 June 2019
European Record	Gabriele Reinsch (GDR)	76.80 m	Neubrandenburg, East Germany	9 July 1988
Oceanian record	Dani Stevens (AUS)	69.64 m	London, United Kingdom	13 August 2017

== Qualification standard ==
The standard to qualify automatically for entry was 64.20 m.

== Schedule ==
The event schedule, in local time (UTC+2), was as follows:

Date	Time	Round
20 August	09:00	Qualification
22 August	20:20	Final

== Results ==
=== Qualification ===
Qualification: Qualifying Performance 64.00 (Q) or at least 12 best performers (q) advanced to the final.

Rank	Group	Name	Nationality	Round			Mark	Notes
Rank	Group	Name	Nationality	1	2	3	Mark	Notes
1	A	Valarie Allman	United States	67.14			67.14	Q
2	A	Feng Bin	China	63.97	61.47	65.68	65.68	Q
3	A	Sandra Perković	Croatia	65.62			65.62	Q, SB
4	B	Claudine Vita	Germany	59.85	64.51		64.51	Q
5	B	Laulauga Tausaga	United States	x	64.34		64.34	Q
6	A	Shanice Craft	Germany	x	63.42	63.18	63.42	q
7	A	Liliana Cá	Portugal	61.27	63.34	x	63.34	q
8	B	Jorinde van Klinken	Netherlands	62.05	63.20	x	63.20	q
9	A	Silinda Morales	Cuba	x	60.54	62.76	62.76	q
10	B	Kristin Pudenz	Germany	62.67	x	62.71	62.71	q
11	B	Mélina Robert-Michon	France	61.82	58.99	60.21	61.82	q
12	A	Daisy Osakue	Italy	x	58.77	61.31	61.31	q
13	A	Vanessa Kamga	Sweden	x	x	60.02	60.02	SB
14	A	Ieva Zarankaitė	Lithuania	59.98	59.92	x	59.98	
15	B	Veronica Fraley	United States	57.71	59.36	x	59.36	
16	B	Daria Zabawska	Poland	59.28	56.44	58.76	59.28	
17	A	Andressa de Morais	Brazil	52.54	59.15	56.01	59.15	
18	B	Marija Tolj	Croatia	58.92	57.28	x	58.92	
19	B	Wang Fang	China	56.72	x	58.78	58.78	
20	A	Taryn Gollshewsky	Australia	58.63	x	58.11	58.63	
21	B	Chioma Onyekwere	Nigeria	54.97	58.58	57.73	58.58	
22	B	Izabela da Silva	Brazil	58.45	57.89	56.94	58.45	
23	B	Samantha Hall	Jamaica	56.31	55.44	58.43	58.43	
24	A	Lisa Brix Pedersen	Denmark	57.96	52.58	56.14	57.96	
25	A	Ashley Anumba	Nigeria	57.77	51.86	55.76	57.77	
26	B	Irina Rodrigues	Portugal	56.86	55.37	57.08	57.08	
27	B	Karen Gallardo	Chile	50.75	48.74	56.74	56.74	
28	A	Subenrat Insaeng	Thailand	56.19	x	x	56.19	
29	A	Elena Bruckner	United States	55.63	54.23	55.94	55.94	
30	B	Annesofie Hartmann Nielsen	Denmark	54.90	53.63	x	54.90	
31	A	Salla Sipponen	Finland	53.85	53.47	54.72	54.72	
32	B	Caisa-Marie Lindfors	Sweden	53.83	53.24	54.54	54.54	
33	A	Nora Monie	Cameroon	x	54.50	54.38	54.50	
34	A	Dóra Kerekes	Hungary	54.41	53.44	52.99	54.41	
35	B	Yolandi Stander	South Africa	x	53.39	53.34	53.39	
36	A	Maki Saito	Japan	x	53.14	53.20	53.20	
37	B	Obiageri Amaechi	Nigeria	x	50.69	51.60	51.60	

=== Final ===
The final was started on 22 August at 20:20.

Rank	Name	Nationality	Round						Mark	Notes
Rank	Name	Nationality	1	2	3	4	5	6	Mark	Notes
1st place, gold medalist(s)	Laulauga Tausaga	United States	x	52.28	65.56	x	69.49	68.36	69.49	PB
2nd place, silver medalist(s)	Valarie Allman	United States	68.57	66.94	68.79	69.23	64.60	68.61	69.23	
3rd place, bronze medalist(s)	Feng Bin	China	66.97	65.16	65.91	67.18	67.41	68.20	68.20	SB
4	Jorinde van Klinken	Netherlands	63.93	64.41	62.94	64.47	67.20	66.97	67.20	SB
5	Sandra Perković	Croatia	x	66.57	x	65.64	65.09	x	66.57	SB
6	Kristin Pudenz	Germany	63.81	63.94	65.73	64.11	65.96	x	65.96	
7	Shanice Craft	Germany	63.59	61.44	65.03	65.47	x	63.67	65.47	
8	Liliana Cá	Portugal	58.86	x	63.59	x	x	62.49	63.59	
9	Mélina Robert-Michon	France	53.34	63.46	x				63.46	
10	Claudine Vita	Germany	60.29	62.51	63.19				63.19	
11	Silinda Morales	Cuba	62.31	53.26	x				62.31	
12	Daisy Osakue	Italy	x	61.13	x				61.13	
