= Nigeria at the 2022 World Athletics Championships =

- Flag of Nigeria
- WA code: NGR
- National federation: Athletics Federation of Nigeria
- Website: www.athleticsnigeria.org/afn/

in Eugene, United States July 15, 2022 – July 24, 2022
- Competitors: 24 (31 men and 34 women) in 26 events
- Medals Ranked 13th: Gold 1 Silver 1 Bronze 0 Total 2

World Athletics Championships appearances
- 1983; 1987; 1991; 1993; 1995; 1997; 1999; 2001; 2003; 2005; 2007; 2009; 2011; 2013; 2015; 2017; 2019; 2022; 2023; 2025

Nigeria competed at the 2022 World Athletics Championships in Eugene, United States, from 15 to 24 July 2022. The Athletics Federation of Nigeria entered 24 athletes.

On 24 July 2022, Nigeria achieved its first world gold medal at the World Athletics Championships after Tobi Amusan won the women's 100 metres hurdles final. Amusan set a new world record when she ran a 12.12 time in her semi-final heat before she bettered that in the final when she crossed the line in a time of 12.06, however, her time in the final was not considered as the new world record due to the wind reading (+2.5 MPS) was over the allowable.

With 1 gold and 1 silver medals, Nigeria ended 13th in the medal table and ranked 20th in the overall placing table with a total of 23 points.

== Medalists ==
| Medal | Athlete | Event | Date |
|---|---|---|---|
| Gold | Tobi Amusan | Women's 100 metres hurdles | 24 July |
| Silver | Ese Brume | Women's long jump | 24 July |

== Team ==
On 1 July 2022, the Athletics Federation of Nigeria (AFN) announced a 22-member team qualified for the World Athletics Championships, However, the final entry list published by World Athletics consigned 24 athletes for Nigeria, with Seye Ogunlewe (men's 4 × 100 metres relay) and Dotun Ogundeji (Shot put) being added to the Nigerian team.

Sprinters Usheoritse Itsekiri, Seye Ogunlewe and hurdler Tobi Amusan were included in the teams for the men and women's 4 × 100 metres relay respectively, but finally they had no participation. In the same way, Sikiru Adeyemi and Knowledge Omovoh were part of the mixed 4 × 400 metres relay team, but had no participation.

== Results ==
Jamaica entered 24 athletes, but only 20 of them participated.

Key

- Note: Ranks given for track events are within the athlete's heat only
- Q = Qualified for the next round
- q = Qualified for the next round as a fastest loser or, in field events, by position without achieving the qualifying target
- NR = National record
- PB = Personal best
- SB = Season best
- N/A = Round not applicable for the event

=== Men ===
Track events

| Athlete | Event | Heat | | Semi-final | | Final | |
| Athlete | Event | Result | Rank | Result | Rank | Result | Rank |
|---|---|---|---|---|---|---|---|
| Favour Ashe | 100 metres | 10.00 (+0.1) | 4 q | 10.12 (−0.1) | 4 | Did not advance | |
| Raymond Ekevwo | 100 metres | 10.17 (−0.1) | 3 Q | 10.20 (+0.3) | 8 | Did not advance | |
| Udodi Onwuzurike | 100 metres | 10.26 (+0.5) | 6 | Did not advance | | | |
| Udodi Onwuzurike | 200 metres | 20.34 (+0.4) | 3 Q | 20.39 (+1.1) | 6 | Did not advance | |
| Ezekiel Nathaniel | 400 metres hurdles | 49.64 | 3 Q | 54.18 | 8 | Did not advance | |
| Favour Ashe; Raymond Ekevwo; Godson Oghenebrume; Udodi Onwuzurike | 4 × 100 metres relay | DQ TR24.7 | | | | | |

Field events

| Athlete | Event | Qualification | | Final | |
| Athlete | Event | Distance | Position | Distance | Position |
|---|---|---|---|---|---|
| Chukwuebuka Enekwechi | Shot put | 20.87 | 10 q | 20.65 | 11 |
| Dotun Ogundeji | Shot put | 18.35 | 28 | Did not advance | |

=== Women ===
Track events

| Athlete | Event | Heat | | Semi-final | | Final | |
| Athlete | Event | Result | Rank | Result | Rank | Result | Rank |
|---|---|---|---|---|---|---|---|
| Rosemary Chukwuma | 100 metres | Withdrew | | | | | |
| Grace Nwokocha | 100 metres | 11.16 (+0.2) | 2 Q | 11.16 (−0.2) | 4 | Did not advance | |
| Favour Ofili | 100 metres | Withdrew | | | | | |
| Rosemary Chukwuma | 200 metres | 22.93 (+2.5) | 5 q | 22.72 (+2.0) | 7 | Did not advance | |
| Grace Nwokocha | 200 metres | 22.61 (+0.9) | 3 Q | 22.49 (+1.4) | 5 | Did not advance | |
| Favour Ofili | 200 metres | 22.24 (+1.9) | 1 Q | 22.30 (−0.1) | 3 | Did not advance | |
| Imaobong Nse Uko | 400 metres | 52.80 | 7 | Did not advance | | | |
| Tobi Amusan | 100 metres hurdles | 12.40 (+1.5) AR | 1 Q | 12.12 (+0.9) WR | 1 Q | 12.06 (+2.5) w | 1st place, gold medalist(s) |
| Rosemary Chukwuma; Grace Nwokocha; Favour Ofili; Joy Udo-Gabriel | 4 × 100 metres relay | 42.68 SB | 3 Q | —N/a | | 42.22 AR | 4 |

Field events

| Athlete | Event | Qualification | | Final | |
| Athlete | Event | Distance | Position | Distance | Position |
|---|---|---|---|---|---|
| Ese Brume | Long jump | 6.82 | 3 Q | 7.02 SB | 2nd place, silver medalist(s) |
| Ruth Usoro | Long jump | 6.69 | 8 q | 6.52 | 11 |
| Ruth Usoro | Triple jump | 13.93 | 21 | Did not advance | |
| Chioma Onyekwere | Discus throw | 57.87 | 21 | Did not advance | |
| Oyesade Olatoye | Hammer throw | 65.71 | 27 | Did not advance | |

=== Mixed ===
| Athlete | Event | Heat | | Final | |
| Athlete | Event | Result | Rank | Result | Rank |
|---|---|---|---|---|---|
| Dubem Amene; Patience Okon George; Samson Nathaniel; Imaobong Nse Uko | 4 × 400 metres relay | 3:14.59 SB | 5 q | 3:16.21 | 6 |
