= Athletics at the 2023 African Games – Women's discus throw =

The women's discus throw event at the 2023 African Games was held on 21 March 2024 in Accra, Ghana.

== Medalists ==
Gold	Silver	Bronze
Obiageri Amaechi; Nigeria	Chioma Onyekwere; Nigeria	Nora Monie; Cameroon

== Results ==
Held on 21 March

Rank	Name	Nationality	#1	#2	#3	#4	#5	#6	Result	Notes
1st place, gold medalist(s)	Obiageri Amaechi	Nigeria	58.01	56.31	58.21	56.98	54.31	58.93	58.93	
2nd place, silver medalist(s)	Chioma Onyekwere	Nigeria	x	x	52.99	48.03	58.03	56.34	58.03	
3rd place, bronze medalist(s)	Nora Monie	Cameroon	53.03	x	55.94	x	56.11	54.62	56.11	
4	Ashley Anumba	Nigeria	52.05	52.02	54.88	53.26	53.64	x	54.88	
5	Yolandi Stander	South Africa	52.88	51.44	52.56	54.44	x	x	54.44	
6	Yelena Mokoka	Democratic Republic of the Congo	51.51	51.65	52.52	49.35	49.31	50.15	52.52	
7	Ashley Erasmus	South Africa	51.29	49.36	49.10	49.93	x	51.85	51.85	
8	Ischke Senekal	South Africa	50.72	50.17	51.32	48.29	49.00	50.38	51.32	
9	Roseline Rakamba	Kenya	48.98	x	50.90				50.90	NR
10	Nabila Bounab	Algeria	40.97	44.79	47.18				47.18	
11	Merhawit Tshaye	Ethiopia	41.13	43.87	42.54				43.87	
12	Alemitu Teklesilassie	Ethiopia	x	x	41.57				41.57	
13	Maria Okomo	Equatorial Guinea	x	x	39.92				39.92	
14	Nassira Koné	Mali	35.18	32.76	30.80				35.18	
15	Emilie Dia	Mali	34.01	30.76	32.02				34.01	
