= Croatia at the 2022 World Athletics Championships =

- Flag of Croatia
- WA code: CRO

in Eugene, United States 15 July 2022 – 24 July 2022
- Competitors: 5 (2 men and 3 women)
- Medals Ranked 33rd: Gold 0 Silver 1 Bronze 0 Total 1

World Athletics Championships appearances
- 1993; 1995; 1997; 1999; 2001; 2003; 2005; 2007; 2009; 2011; 2013; 2015; 2017; 2019; 2022; 2023; 2025

Other related appearances
- Yugoslavia (1983–1991)

Croatia competed at the 2022 World Athletics Championships in Eugene, United States, from 15 to 24 July 2022.

== Medallists ==
| Medal | Name | Event | Date |
|---|---|---|---|
| Silver | Sandra Perković | Women's discus throw | 20 July |

== Results ==
Croatia entered 5 athletes.

Key

- Q = Qualified for the next round
- q = Qualified for the next round as a fastest loser or, in field events, by position without achieving the qualifying target
- NR = National record
- PB = Personal best
- SB = Season best
- N/A = Round not applicable for the event

=== Men ===
Field events

| Athlete | Event | Qualification | | Final | |
| Athlete | Event | Distance | Position | Distance | Position |
|---|---|---|---|---|---|
| Filip Mihaljević | Shot put | 21.17 | 7 q | 21.82 | 6 |
| Martin Marković | Discus throw | 60.59 | 23 | Did not advance | |

=== Women ===
Field events

| Athlete | Event | Qualification | | Final | |
| Athlete | Event | Distance | Position | Distance | Position |
|---|---|---|---|---|---|
| Sandra Perković | Discus throw | 64.23 | 7 Q | 68.45 SB | 2nd place, silver medalist(s) |
| Marija Tolj | Discus throw | 61.46 | 10 q | 63.07 | 8 |
| Sara Kolak | Javelin throw | NM | — | Did not advance | |
