= 2019 World Athletics Championships – Women's discus throw =

Women's discus throw at the 2019 World Championships
- Venue: Khalifa International Stadium
- Dates: 2 October (qualification); 4 October (final)
- Competitors: 30 from 20 nations
- Winning distance: 69.17

Medalists
gold medal	Yaime Pérez	Cuba
silver medal	Denia Caballero	Cuba
bronze medal	Sandra Perković	Croatia

Video on YouTube Official Video

The women's discus throw at the 2019 World Athletics Championships was held at the Khalifa International Stadium in Doha, Qatar, from 2 to 4 October 2019.

== Summary ==
In the finals, Feng Bin threw 62.48m as the first thrower in the ring. The next thrower was world leader Yaime Pérez, who promptly took the lead with a 68.10m. Three throwers later, defending champion and double Olympic champion Sandra Perković threw 66.72m to take over second place. Those three held their positions until the end of the second round, when 2015 champion Denia Caballero dropped in a 66.80m to move into silver position. In fact, the three over 66 and a half metres would be the only ones over 63.50m all day. Caballero improved her position with a 67.32m in the third then took the lead with a 68.44m in the fourth round. Her teammate Pérez answered in the fifth round with the winner 69.17 m (226 ft 11 in).

== Records ==
Before the competition records were as follows:

Record	Perf.	Athlete	Nat.	Date	Location
World	76.80	Gabriele Reinsch	GDR	9 Jul 1988	Neubrandenburg, Germany
Championship	71.62	Martina Hellmann	GER	31 Aug 1987	Rome, Italy
World leading	69.39	Yaime Pérez	CUB	16 Jul 2019	Sotteville, France
African	64.87	Elizna Naudé	RSA	2 Mar 2007	Stellenbosch, South Africa
Asian	71.68	Xiao Yanling	CHN	14 Mar 1992	Beijing, China
NACAC	70.88	Hilda Ramos	CUB	8 May 1992	Havana, Cuba
South American	65.98	Andressa de Morais	BRA	6 Aug 2019	Lima, Peru
European	76.80	Gabriele Reinsch	GDR	9 Jul 1988	Neubrandenburg, Germany
Oceanian	69.64	Dani Stevens	AUS	13 Aug 2017	London, Great Britain

== Schedule ==
The event schedule, in local time (UTC+3), is as follows:

Date	Time	Round
2 October	18:00	Qualification
4 October	21:00	Final

== Results ==
=== Qualification ===
Qualification: Qualifying Performance 63.00 (Q) or at least 12 best performers (q) advanced to the final.

Rank	Group	Name	Nationality	Round			Mark	Notes
Rank	Group	Name	Nationality	1	2	3	Mark	Notes
1	A	Yaime Pérez	Cuba	67.78			67.78	Q
2	B	Denia Caballero	Cuba	x	65.86		65.86	Q
3	B	Sandra Perković	Croatia	65.20			65.20	Q
4	A	Mélina Robert-Michon	France	64.02			64.02	Q, SB
5	B	Laulauga Tausaga	United States	61.33	63.94		63.94	Q, PB
6	A	Kristin Pudenz	Germany	63.35			63.35	Q
7	A	Chen Yang	China	62.09	62.83	63.10	63.10	Q
8	B	Nadine Müller	Germany	61.06	62.33	62.93	62.93	q
9	B	Feng Bin	China	60.22	62.51	62.09	62.51	q
10	B	Fernanda Martins	Brazil	x	62.33	60.53	62.33	q
11	A	Claudine Vita	Germany	61.24	62.31	62.09	62.31	q
12	A	Valarie Allman	United States	57.99	x	62.25	62.25	q
13	B	Chioma Onyekwere	Nigeria	61.38	x	x	61.38	PB
14	A	Kelsey Card	United States	60.15	61.32	59.39	61.32	
15	A	Chrysoula Anagnostopoulou	Greece	56.43	58.33	59.91	59.91	SB
16	A	Shanice Love	Jamaica	x	56.65	59.50	59.50	
17	B	Eliška Staňková	Czech Republic	58.64	57.41	58.98	58.98	SB
18	B	Jorinde van Klinken	Netherlands	x	58.58	x	58.58	
19	B	Shadae Lawrence	Jamaica	57.55	58.51	x	58.51	
20	B	Daisy Osakue	Italy	57.55	x	x	57.55	
21	A	Dragana Tomašević	Serbia	x	57.13	56.93	57.13	
22	B	Daria Zabawska	Poland	x	57.05	x	57.05	
23	B	Irina Rodrigues	Portugal	x	56.21	x	56.21	
24	B	Vanessa Kamga	Sweden	53.58	55.87	x	55.87	
25	A	Nataliya Semenova	Ukraine	x	54.68	54.57	54.68	
26	A	Liliana Cá	Portugal	52.89	51.36	54.31	54.31	
27	A	Melany Matheus	Cuba	52.52	x	51.64	52.52	
28	A	Alexandra Emilianov	Moldova	x	52.05	50.86	52.05	
29	B	Nanaka Kori	Japan	46.03	48.82	48.01	48.82	
	A	Marija Tolj	Croatia	x	x	x	NM	

=== Final ===
The final was started on 4 October at 21:00.

Rank	Name	Nationality	Round						Mark	Notes
Rank	Name	Nationality	1	2	3	4	5	6	Mark	Notes
1st place, gold medalist(s)	Yaime Pérez	Cuba	68.10	65.01	65.76	68.01	69.17	64.61	69.17	
2nd place, silver medalist(s)	Denia Caballero	Cuba	x	66.80	67.32	68.44	x	65.64	68.44	
3rd place, bronze medalist(s)	Sandra Perković	Croatia	66.72	62.30	66.19	x	x	x	66.72	
4	Chen Yang	China	59.54	61.50	63.38	x	61.31	x	63.38	
5	Feng Bin	China	62.48	x	x	61.31	x	61.00	62.48	
6	Fernanda Martins	Brazil	60.47	62.44	61.11	x	x	62.24	62.44	
7	Valarie Allman	United States	x	61.82	59.40	x	x	x	61.82	
8	Nadine Müller	Germany	x	59.88	60.98	61.55	x	60.35	61.55	
9	Claudine Vita	Germany	60.77	59.14	x				60.77	
10	Mélina Robert-Michon	France	x	59.99	57.64				59.99	
11	Kristin Pudenz	Germany	55.94	57.69	x				57.69	
	Laulauga Tausaga	United States	x	x	x				NM	
