= 2022 World Athletics Championships – Women's discus throw =

Women's discus throw at the 2022 World Championships
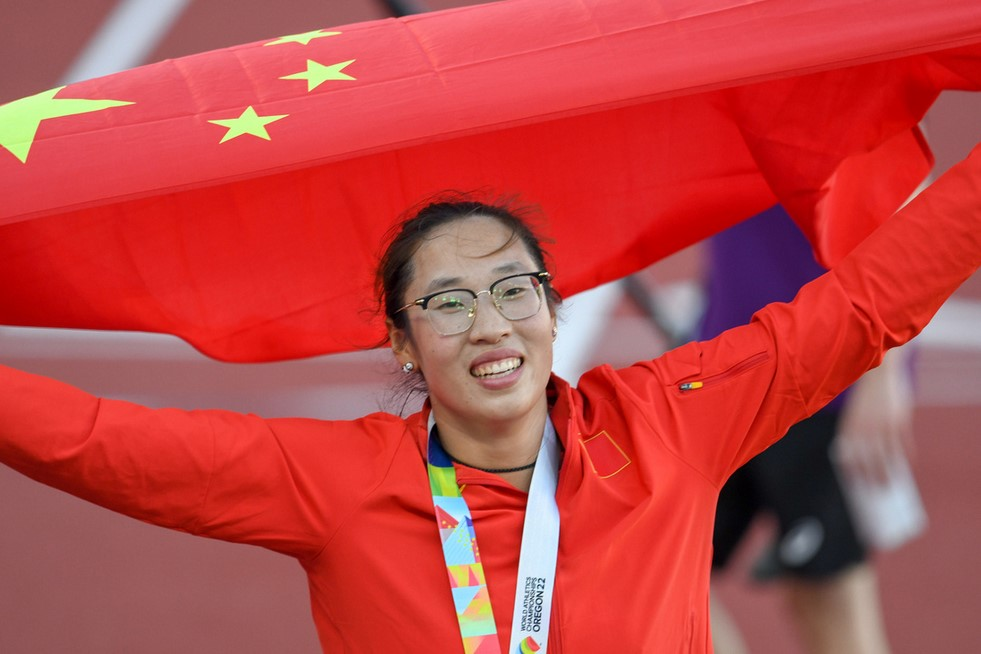
- Feng Bin shortly after winning the final.
- Venue: Hayward Field
- Dates: 18 July (qualification); 20 July (final)
- Competitors: 31 from 20 nations
- Winning distance: 69.12

Medalists
gold medal	Feng Bin	China
silver medal	Sandra Perković	Croatia
bronze medal	Valarie Allman	United States

The women's discus throw at the 2022 World Athletics Championships was held at the Hayward Field in Eugene on 18 and 20 July 2022.

== Records ==
Before the competition records were as follows:

Record	Athlete & Nat.	Perf.	Location	Date
World record	Gabriele Reinsch (GDR)	76.80 m	Neubrandenburg, East Germany	9 July 1988
Championship record	Martina Hellmann (GDR)	71.62 m	Rome, Italy	31 August 1987
World Leading	Valarie Allman (USA)	71.46 m	San Diego, United States	8 April 2022
African Record	Elizna Naude (RSA)	64.87 m	Stellenbosch, South Africa	2 March 2007
Asian Record	Xiao Yanling (CHN)	71.68 m	Beijing, China	14 March 1992
North, Central American and Caribbean record	Valarie Allman (USA)	71.46 m	San Diego, United States	8 April 2022
South American Record	Andressa de Morais (BRA)	65.34 m	Leiria, Portugal	26 June 2019
European Record	Gabriele Reinsch (GDR)	76.80 m	Neubrandenburg, East Germany	9 July 1988
Oceanian record	Dani Stevens (AUS)	69.64 m	London, Great Britain	13 August 2017

== Qualification standard ==
The standard to qualify automatically for entry was 63.50 m.

== Schedule ==
The event schedule, in local time (UTC−7), was as follows:

Date	Time	Round
18 July	17:10	Qualification
20 July	18:30	Final

== Results ==
=== Qualification ===
Qualification: Qualifying Performance 64.00 (Q) or at least 12 best performers (q) advanced to the final.

Rank	Group	Name	Nationality	Round			Mark	Notes
Rank	Group	Name	Nationality	1	2	3	Mark	Notes
1	A	Valarie Allman	United States	x	x	68.36	68.36	Q
2	B	Jorinde van Klinken	Netherlands	62.15	x	65.66	65.66	Q, SB
3	B	Yaimé Pérez	Cuba	60.77	65.32		65.32	Q, SB
4	B	Claudine Vita	Germany	62.13	64.98		64.98	Q, SB
5	A	Shanice Craft	Germany	x	64.55		64.55	Q
6	B	Kristin Pudenz	Germany	63.55	64.39		64.39	Q
7	B	Sandra Perković	Croatia	64.23			64.23	Q
8	A	Feng Bin	China	64.01			64.01	Q
9	A	Laulauga Tausaga	United States	x	62.85	x	62.85	q
10	A	Marija Tolj	Croatia	61.46	x	x	61.46	q
11	A	Liliana Cá	Portugal	x	61.41	61.01	61.41	q
12	B	Mélina Robert-Michon	France	59.89	61.21	x	61.21	q
13	B	Alexandra Emilianov	Moldova	60.67	x	x	60.67	SB
14	B	Fernanda Martins	Brazil	58.18	60.08	58.43	60.08	
15	B	Izabela da Silva	Brazil	55.28	59.78	57.29	59.78	
16	A	Silinda Oneisi Morales	Cuba	58.73	55.55	54.07	58.73	
17	B	Veronica Fraley	United States	55.98	51.72	58.32	58.32	
18	A	Jade Lally	Great Britain & N.I.	58.21	55.85	x	58.21	
19	A	Chrysoula Anagnostopoulou	Greece	58.15	56.04	57.61	58.15	
20	A	Andressa de Morais	Brazil	55.68	58.11	56.79	58.11	
21	A	Chioma Onyekwere	Nigeria	x	57.87	x	57.87	
22	B	Karen Gallardo	Chile	54.78	57.78	x	57.78	
23	B	Irina Rodrigues	Portugal	56.79	54.89	57.69	57.69	
24	B	Rachel Dincoff	United States	57.38	x	57.62	57.62	
25	A	Ieva Zarankaitė	Lithuania	57.39	57.31	57.57	57.57	
26	A	Salla Sipponen	Finland	x	57.16	56.04	57.16	
27	B	Samantha Hall	Jamaica	x	56.95	56.99	56.99	
28	A	Daisy Osakue	Italy	56.74	x	x	56.74	
29	B	Lisa Brix Pedersen	Denmark	x	54.60	56.54	56.54	
30	A	Trinity Tutti	Canada	x	x	54.36	54.36	

=== Final ===
The final was started on 20 July at 18:33.

Rank	Name	Nationality	Round						Mark	Notes
Rank	Name	Nationality	1	2	3	4	5	6	Mark	Notes
1st place, gold medalist(s)	Feng Bin	China	69.12	x	66.89	65.88	65.60	64.62	69.12	PB
2nd place, silver medalist(s)	Sandra Perković	Croatia	67.74	68.45	x	67.74	66.59	65.57	68.45	SB
3rd place, bronze medalist(s)	Valarie Allman	United States	67.62	66.47	68.30	68.05	x	51.41	68.30	
4	Jorinde van Klinken	Netherlands	x	62.41	64.00	60.68	64.97	x	64.97	
5	Claudine Vita	Germany	59.87	64.24	62.09	x	62.60	61.86	64.24	
6	Liliana Cá	Portugal	53.24	63.64	x	63.99	61.99	x	63.99	SB
7	Yaimé Pérez	Cuba	x	62.36	61.32	63.07	62.94	62.36	63.07	
8	Marija Tolj	Croatia	x	63.07	62.35	61.70	60.61	61.82	63.07	
9	Shanice Craft	Germany	61.23	x	62.35				62.35	
10	Mélina Robert-Michon	France	53.46	60.36	59.98				60.36	
11	Kristin Pudenz	Germany	x	59.97	x				59.97	
12	Laulauga Tausaga	United States	56.47	55.93	x				56.47	
