= Izabela da Silva =

Brazilian discus thrower (born 1995)

Personal information
- Full name: Izabela Rodrigues da Silva
- Born: 2 August 1995 (age 30) Adamantina, Brazil

Sport
- Sport: Athletics
- Event: Discus throw
Medal record
Women's athletics
Representing Brazil
Pan American Games
Gold medal – first place	2023 Santiago	Discus throw

Izabela Rodrigues da Silva (born 2 August 1995) is a Brazilian athlete specialising in the discus throw. She won a gold medal at the 2014 World Junior Championships. She competed at the 2020 Summer Olympics.

Her personal best in the event was 63.04 metres set in Montreuil, France, in 2022.

In April 2024, at the Shanghai stage of the Diamond League, she reached the mark of 64.66 meters in the discus throw, qualifying to participate in the Paris Olympic Games and reaching the best personal mark in her career.

On 28 June 2024, she improved her personal best by throwing 65.25m at the Brazil Trophy.

She finished 9th at the 2025 World Athletics Championships.

== International competitions ==
Year	Competition	Venue	Position	Event	Notes
Representing Brazil
2011	World Youth Championships	Lille, France	11th	Shot put	13.36 m
2011	World Youth Championships	Lille, France	24th (q)	Discus throw	43.98 m
2012	South American Youth Championships	Mendoza, Argentina	1st	Shot put (3 kg)	16.82 m
2012	South American Youth Championships	Mendoza, Argentina	1st	Discus throw	47.19 m
2013	Pan American Junior Championships	Medellin, Colombia	2nd	Shot put	14.90 m
2013	Pan American Junior Championships	Medellin, Colombia	1st	Discus throw	54.15 m
2013	South American Junior Championships	Resistencia, Argentina	1st	Shot put	15.05 m
2013	South American Junior Championships	Resistencia, Argentina	1st	Discus throw	55.88 m
2014	World Junior Championships	Eugene, United States	16th (q)	Shot put	14.54 m
2014	World Junior Championships	Eugene, United States	1st	Discus throw	58.03 m
2014	South American U23 Championships	Montevideo, Uruguay	2nd	Shot put	15.95 m
2014	South American U23 Championships	Montevideo, Uruguay	1st	Discus throw	58.70 m
2016	South American U23 Championships	Lima, Peru	1st	Shot put	16.25 m
2016	South American U23 Championships	Lima, Peru	1st	Discus throw	53.04 m
2021	South American Championships	Guayaquil, Ecuador	1st	Discus throw	62.18 m
2021	Olympic Games	Tokyo, Japan	11th	Discus throw	60.39 m
2022	World Championships	Eugene, United States	15th (q)	Discus throw	59.78 m
2022	South American Games	Asunción, Paraguay	1st	Discus throw	60.86 m
2023	South American Championships	São Paulo, Brazil	1st	Discus throw	61.26 m
2023	World Championships	Budapest, Hungary	22nd (q)	Discus throw	58.45 m
2023	Pan American Games	Santiago, Chile	1st	Discus throw	59.63 m
2024	Ibero-American Championships	Cuiabá, Brazil	1st	Discus throw	63.60 m
2024	Olympic Games	Paris, France	17th (q)	Discus throw	61.68 m
2025	South American Championships	Mar del Plata, Argentina	1st	Discus throw	62.87 m
2025	World Championships	Tokyo, Japan	9th	Discus throw	63.22 m

== Personal life ==
She is a lesbian.
