= Kristin Pudenz =

German discus thrower (born 1993)

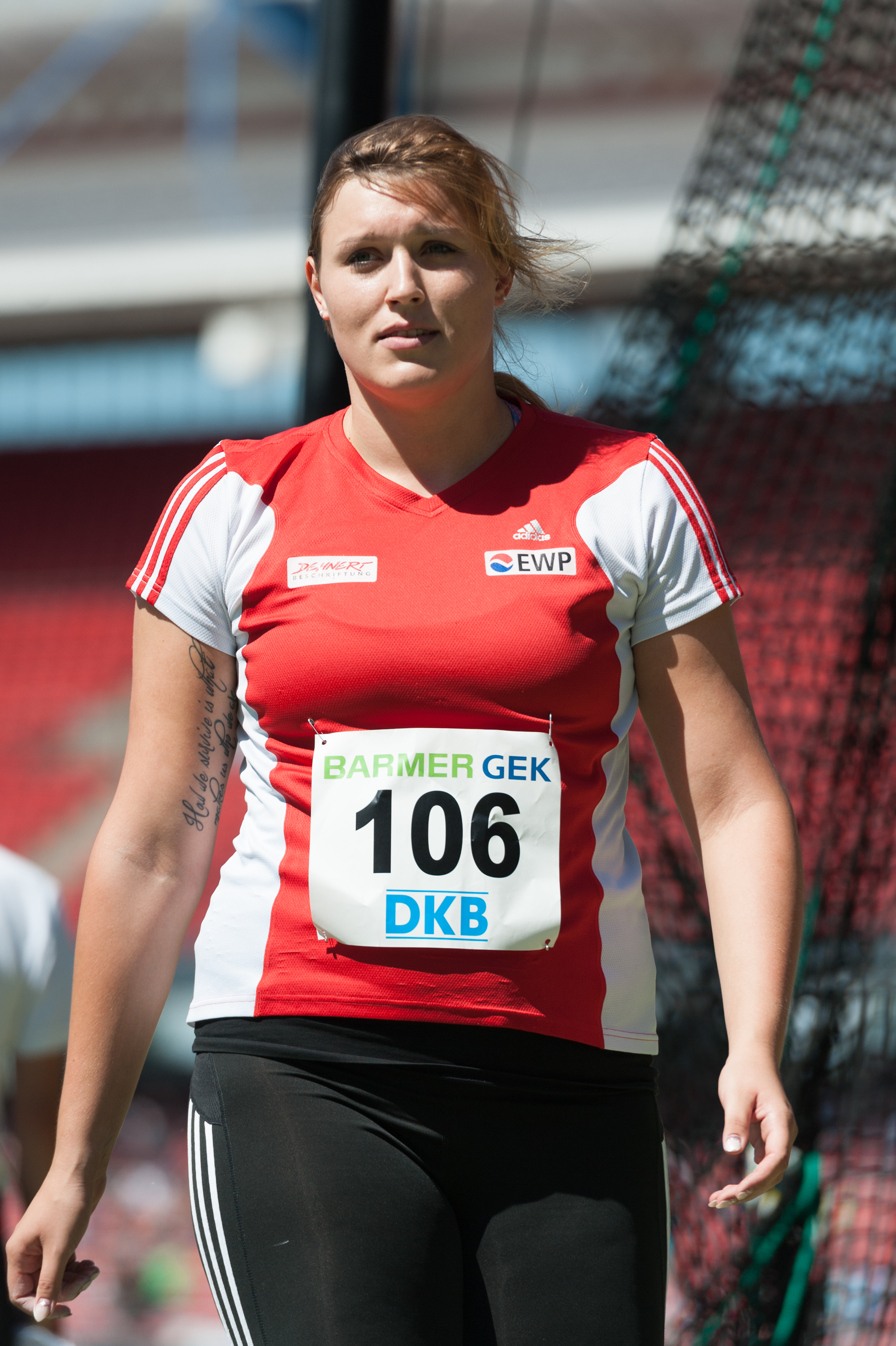
- Pudenz in 2015

Personal information
- Born: 9 February 1993 (age 33) Herford, Germany
- Education: Fachhochschule Potsdam
- Height: 1.91 m (6 ft 3 in)

Sport
- Sport: Athletics
- Event: Discus throw
- Club: SC Potsdam
Medal record
Women's athletics
Representing Germany
Olympic Games
Silver medal – second place	2020 Tokyo	Discus throw
European Games
Gold medal – first place	2023 Kraków–Małopolska	Discus throw
European Championships
Silver medal – second place	2022 Munich	Discus throw

Kristin Pudenz (born 9 February 1993) is a German athlete specialising in the discus throw. She won a silver medal at the 2020 Olympic Games, and has competed at multiple other major championships including the 2024 Olympic Games. She was also a silver medalist at the 2022 European Athletics Championships.

== Career ==
She is a member of Sport Club Potsdam, and attended the University of Potsdam. She won the gold medal in the discus throw at the 2017 Summer Universiade in Taipei, having also previously won a bronze medal at the 2015 European U23 Championships in Tallinn, Estonia.

She competed in the discus throw at the 2019 World Athletics Championships in Doha, Qatar, placing eleventh in the final.

Pudenz won the silver medal at the delayed 2020 Olympic Games in Tokyo, Japan held in 2021 with a personal best throw of 66.86 metres.

She competed at the 2022 World Athletics Championships in Eugene, Oregon, where she successfully reached the final and placed eleventh overall. She also won the silver medal at the 2022 European Athletics Championships in Munich, Germany, where she set a personal best of 67.87 metres.

She won the gold medal whilst competing for Germany at the 2023 European Athletics Team Championships in Silesia, Poland. She competed at the 2023 World Athletics Championships in Budapest, Hungary, placing sixth overall with a throw of 65.96 metres.

In June 2024, she won the German Athletics Championships women's discus throw competition for the sixth consecutive year. She competed at the 2024 Olympic Games in Paris, France, where she qualified for the final and placed tenth overall with a best throw of 60.38 metres.

== International competitions ==
Year	Competition	Venue	Position	Notes
Representing Germany
2009	European Youth Olympic Festival	Tampere, Finland	3rd	44.71 m
2013	European U23 Championships	Tampere, Finland	4th	55.31 m
2015	European Cup Winter Throwing (U23)	Leiria, Portugal	1st	56.62 m
2015	European U23 Championships	Tallinn, Estonia	3rd	59.94 m
2017	Universiade	Taipei, Taiwan	1st	59.09 m
2019	World Championships	Doha, Qatar	11th	57.69 m
2021	Olympic Games	Tokyo, Japan	2nd	66.86 m
2022	World Championships	Eugene, United States	11th	59.97 m
2022	European Championships	Munich, Germany	2nd	67.87 m
2023	World Championships	Budapest, Hungary	6th	65.96 m
2024	Olympic Games	Paris, France	10th	60.38 m
2025	World Championships	Tokyo, Japan	13th (q)	62.02 m
2026	European Championships	Birmingham, United Kingdom	5th	63.27 m
