= Croatia at the 2015 World Championships in Athletics =

- WA code: CRO

in Beijing
- Competitors: 6
- Medals Ranked 20th: Gold 0 Silver 2 Bronze 0 Total 2

World Championships in Athletics appearances
- 1993; 1995; 1997; 1999; 2001; 2003; 2005; 2007; 2009; 2011; 2013; 2015; 2017; 2019; 2022; 2023; 2025

Other related appearances
- Yugoslavia (1983–1991)

Croatia competed at the 2015 World Championships in Athletics in Beijing, China, from 22–30 August 2015.

== Medalists ==
Medal	Athlete	Event	Date
Silver	Sandra Perković	Discus throw	25 August
Silver	Blanka Vlašić	High jump	29 August

== Results ==
(q – qualified, NM – no mark, SB – season best)

=== Men ===
Field events

Athlete	Event	Qualification		Final	
Athlete	Event	Distance	Position	Distance	Position
Ivan Horvat	Pole vault	5.70 NR	15 Q	5.65	9
Marin Premeru	Shot put	19.33	23	did not advance	

=== Women ===
Track and road events

Athlete	Event	Heat		Semifinal		Final	
Athlete	Event	Result	Rank	Result	Rank	Result	Rank
Andrea Ivančević	100 metres hurdles	12.88	9 Q	33.95	20	did not advance	

Field events

Athlete	Event	Qualification		Final	
Athlete	Event	Distance	Position	Distance	Position
Sandra Perković	Discus throw	64.51	2 Q	67.39	2nd place, silver medalist(s)
Ana Šimić	High jump	1.92	1 q	1.88	9
Blanka Vlašić	High jump	1.92	1 q	2.01 SB	2nd place, silver medalist(s)
