= 2022 African Championships in Athletics – Women's discus throw =

The women's discus throw event at the 2022 African Championships in Athletics was held on 10 June in Port Louis, Mauritius.

== Results ==
Rank	Athlete	Nationality	#1	#2	#3	#4	#5	#6	Result	Notes
1st place, gold medalist(s)	Chioma Onyekwere	Nigeria	x	x	58.18	x	58.19	x	58.19	
2nd place, silver medalist(s)	Nora Atim Monie	Cameroon	50.64	53.50	50.48	54.44	50.01	53.83	54.44	
3rd place, bronze medalist(s)	Obiageri Amaechi	Nigeria	53.10	51.38	47.93	54.15	49.93	46.98	54.15	
4	Riette Heyns	South Africa	x	49.19	47.56	53.76	50.70	50.11	53.76	
5	Princess Kara	Nigeria	51.15	50.34	x	x	x	x	51.15	
6	Rana Khaled Mahmoud	Egypt	x	46.61	46.12	47.26	x	49.65	49.65	
7	Rima Ahmed Abdallah	Egypt	46.93	47.90	46.81	44.85	46.11	48.50	48.50	
8	Chaima Chouikh	Tunisia	x	47.79	x	39.99	x	41.94	47.79	
9	Zonica Lindeque	South Africa	45.58	41.77	42.07				45.58	
10	Yolandi Stander	South Africa	x	45.43	43.45				45.43	
