= Veronica Fraley =

American athlete (born 2000)

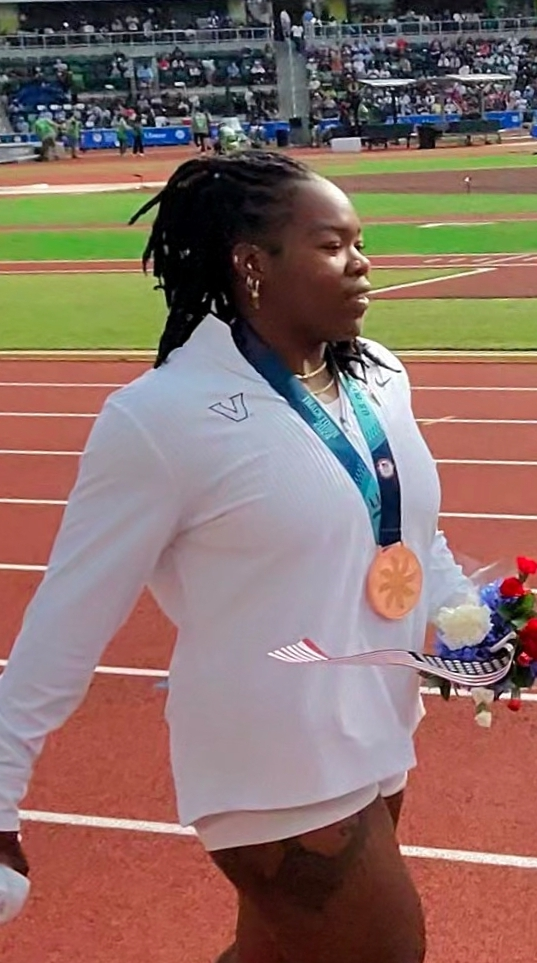
- Fraley in 2024

Personal information
- Born: May 27, 2000 (age 26) Raleigh, North Carolina, U.S.
- Height: 5 ft 6 in (168 cm)

Sport
- Country: United States
- Sport: Athletics
- Event: Discus throw

Achievements and titles
- Personal bests: Discus: 68.72 (Ramona, 2025)

Veronica Fraley (born May 27, 2000) is an American track and field athlete who competes in the discus throw.

== Early life ==
She is from Raleigh, North Carolina, and attended Wakefield High School. As a junior, Fraley led the state in the shot put, discus and hammer throw. She committed to Clemson University in October 2017. She later attended Vanderbilt University.

== Career ==
She threw a personal best 53.57m in the discus at the Penn Relays in May 2018. That spring she also won the Bojangles Track and Field Classic and before the Pepsi Florida Relays. In June 2019, she finished second at the USATF U20 championships.

She won the women's discus throw with a personal-best 62.30m at the USATF Throws Festival in Tucson, Arizona. In July 2022, she competed at the 2022 World Athletics Championships in Eugene, Oregon.

Competing for Vanderbilt University, she became the first female athlete to win the discus throw competition for Vanderbilt at the Southeastern Conference Championships, throwing a lifetime-best of 62.84m in Baton Rouge in May 2023. In August 2023, she competed at the 2023 World Athletics Championships in Budapest.

In April 2024, she set a new personal best of 67.17 metres at the Oklahoma Throws Series meeting in Ramona. She competed at the 2024 Summer Olympics in Paris. She threw a personal best 68.72 metres in Ramona, Oklahoma on 12 April 2025.

== Personal life ==
Fraley can bench press 350lbs.
