= Croatia at the 2023 World Athletics Championships =

- Flag of Croatia
- WA code: CRO

in Budapest, Hungary 19 August 2023 – 27 August 2023
- Competitors: 9 (4 men and 5 women)
- Medals: Gold 0 Silver 0 Bronze 0 Total 0

World Athletics Championships appearances
- 1993; 1995; 1997; 1999; 2001; 2003; 2005; 2007; 2009; 2011; 2013; 2015; 2017; 2019; 2022; 2023; 2025

Other related appearances
- Yugoslavia (1983–1991)

Croatia competed at the 2023 World Athletics Championships in Budapest, Hungary, from 19 to 27 August 2023.

== Results ==
Croatia entered 9 athletes.

Key

- Q = Qualified for the next round
- q = Qualified for the next round as a fastest loser or, in field events, by position without achieving the qualifying target
- NR = National record
- PB = Personal best
- SB = Season best
- N/A = Round not applicable for the event

=== Men ===
Track and road events

Athlete	Event	Heat		Semifinal		Final	
Athlete	Event	Result	Rank	Result	Rank	Result	Rank
Marino Bloudek	800 metres	1:46.63	26	Did not advance			

Field events

Athlete	Event	Qualification		Final	
Athlete	Event	Distance	Position	Distance	Position
Filip Pravdica	Long jump	7.74	23	Did not advance	
Filip Mihaljević	Shot put	21.10	8 q	21.57	7
Martin Marković	Discus throw	61.88	26	Did not advance	

=== Women ===
Track and road events

Athlete	Event	Final	
Athlete	Event	Result	Rank
Bojana Bjeljac	Marathon	2:35:49 SB	33

Field events

Athlete	Event	Qualification		Final	
Athlete	Event	Distance	Position	Distance	Position
Jana Koščak	High jump	DNS		Did not advance	
Sandra Perković	Discus throw	65.62 SB	3 Q	66.57 SB	5
Marija Tolj	Discus throw	58.92	18	Did not advance	
Sara Kolak	Javelin throw	55.89	23	Did not advance	
