= Fernanda Martins =

Brazilian discus thrower

Personal information
- Born: 26 July 1988 (age 37) Santa Cruz do Sul, Brazil
- Height: 1.75 m (5 ft 9 in)
- Weight: 82 kg (181 lb)

Sport
- Sport: Track and field
- Event: Discus throw
Medal record
Women's athletics
Representing Brazil
Pan American Games
Silver medal – second place	2019 Lima	Discus throw
South American Games
Silver medal – second place	2018 Cochabamba	Discus throw

Fernanda Raquel Borges Martins (born 26 July 1988) is a Brazilian athlete whose specialty is the discus throw. She represented her country at two consecutive World Championships, in 2013 and 2015, failing to qualify for the final on both occasions. She has won multiple medals on regional level. In June 2021, she qualified to represent Brazil at the 2020 Summer Olympics.

== Personal bests ==
- Discus Throw: 64.66 – (Brazil) Bragança Paulista, 15 September 2018

== Competition record ==
Year	Competition	Venue	Position	Event	Notes
Representing Brazil
2007	South American Junior Championships	São Paulo, Brazil	1st	Discus throw	44.44 m
2008	South American U23 Championships	Lima, Peru	4th	Discus throw	45.30 m
2010	South American Games / South American U23 Championships	Medellín, Colombia	1st	Discus throw	55.68 m
2011	South American Championships	Buenos Aires, Argentina	3rd	Discus throw	54.18 m
2011	Universiade	Shenzhen, China	7th	Discus throw	56.46 m
2011	Pan American Games	Guadalajara, Mexico	7th	Discus throw	54.56 m
2012	Ibero-American Games	Barquisimeto, Venezuela	2nd	Discus throw	57.87 m
2013	South American Championships	Cartagena, Colombia	1st	Discus throw	60.79 m
2013	World Championships	Moscow, Russia	–	Discus throw	NM
2014	South American Games	Santiago, Chile	3rd	Discus throw	56.08 m
2014	Ibero-American Games	São Paulo, Brazil	2nd	Discus throw	59.08 m
2014	Pan American Sports Festival	Mexico City, Mexico	2nd	Discus throw	60.87 m
2015	South American Championships	Lima, Peru	2nd	Discus throw	58.22 m
2015	Pan American Games	Toronto, Canada	4th	Discus throw	60.50 m
2015	World Championships	Beijing, China	26th (q)	Discus throw	56.74 m
2016	Ibero-American Championships	Rio de Janeiro, Brazil	2nd	Discus throw	58.43 m
2016	Olympic Games	Rio de Janeiro, Brazil	31st (q)	Discus throw	51.85 m
2017	South American Championships	Asunción, Paraguay	2nd	Discus throw	60.80 m
2017	World Championships	London, United Kingdom	16th (q)	Discus throw	58.51 m
2018	South American Games	Cochabamba, Bolivia	2nd	Discus throw	57.29 m
2018	Ibero-American Championships	Trujillo, Peru	2nd	Discus throw	60.14 m
2019	South American Championships	Lima, Peru	2nd	Discus throw	60.87 m
2019	Pan American Games	Lima, Peru	2nd	Discus throw	62.23 m
2019	World Championships	Doha, Qatar	6th	Discus throw	62.44 m
2021	Olympic Games	Tokyo, Japan	24th (q)	Discus throw	57.90 m
2022	Ibero-American Championships	La Nucía, Spain	5th	Discus throw	57.05 m
2022	World Championships	Eugene, United States	14th (q)	Discus throw	60.08 m
