= Croatia at the 2013 World Championships in Athletics =

- WA code: CRO

in Moscow
- Competitors: 7
- Medals: Gold 1 Silver 0 Bronze 0 Total 1

World Championships in Athletics appearances
- 1993; 1995; 1997; 1999; 2001; 2003; 2005; 2007; 2009; 2011; 2013; 2015; 2017; 2019; 2022; 2023; 2025

Other related appearances
- Yugoslavia (1983–1991)

Croatia is competing at the 2013 World Championships in Athletics in Moscow, Russia, from 10 to 18 August 2013. A team of 7 athletes was announced to represent the country in the event.

== Results ==
(q – qualified, NM – no mark, SB – season best)

=== Men ===
Field events

Athlete	Event	Preliminaries		Final	
Athlete	Event	Width Height	Rank	Width Height	Rank
Ivan Horvat	Pole vault	NM		did not advance	
Marin Premeru	Shot put	18.71	25	did not advance	
Martin Maric	Discus throw	61.98	15	did not advance	

=== Women ===
Track and road events

Athlete	Event	Preliminaries		Heats		Semifinals		Final	
Athlete	Event	Time	Rank	Time	Rank	Time	Rank	Time	Rank
Lisa Christina Stublic	Marathon								

Field events

Athlete	Event	Preliminaries		Final	
Athlete	Event	Width Height	Rank	Width Height	Rank
Ana Simic	High jump	1.88	19	did not advance	
Valentina Muzaric	Shot put	16.47	28	did not advance	
Sandra Perković	Discus throw	63.62	3	67.99	1st place, gold medalist(s)
