= Croatia at the 2017 World Championships in Athletics =

- Flag of Croatia
- WA code: CRO
- National federation: Croatian Athletics Federation
- Website: has.hr (in Croatian)

in London, United Kingdom 4–13 August 2017
- Competitors: 9 (3 men and 6 women) in 6 events
- Medals Ranked =17th: Gold 1 Silver 0 Bronze 1 Total 2

World Championships in Athletics appearances
- 1993; 1995; 1997; 1999; 2001; 2003; 2005; 2007; 2009; 2011; 2013; 2015; 2017; 2019; 2022; 2023; 2025

Other related appearances
- Yugoslavia (1983–1991)

Croatia competed at the 2017 World Championships in Athletics in London, United Kingdom, from 4–13 August 2017.

== Medalists ==
Medal	Name	Event	Date
Gold	Sandra Perković	Women's discus throw	13 August
Bronze	Stipe Žunić	Men's shot put	6 August

== Results ==
=== Men ===
Field events

Athlete	Event	Qualification		Final	
Athlete	Event	Distance	Position	Distance	Position
Ivan Horvat	Pole vault	5.45	22	Did not advance	
Filip Mihaljević	Shot put	20.33	14	Did not advance	
Stipe Žunić	Shot put	20.86	7 Q	21.46	3rd place, bronze medalist(s)

=== Women ===
Track and road events

Athlete	Event	Final	
Athlete	Event	Result	Rank
Bojana Bjeljac	Marathon	2:46.46	57
Matea Matošević	Marathon	2:55.06	69
Nikolina Stepan	Marathon	2:59.43	76

Field events

Athlete	Event	Qualification		Final	
Athlete	Event	Distance	Position	Distance	Position
Ana Šimić	High jump	1.85	25	Did not advance	
Sandra Perković	Discus throw	69.67	1 Q	70.31	1st place, gold medalist(s)
Sara Kolak	Javelin throw	63.24	8 q	64.95	4
