= Valarie Sion =

American discus thrower (born 1995)

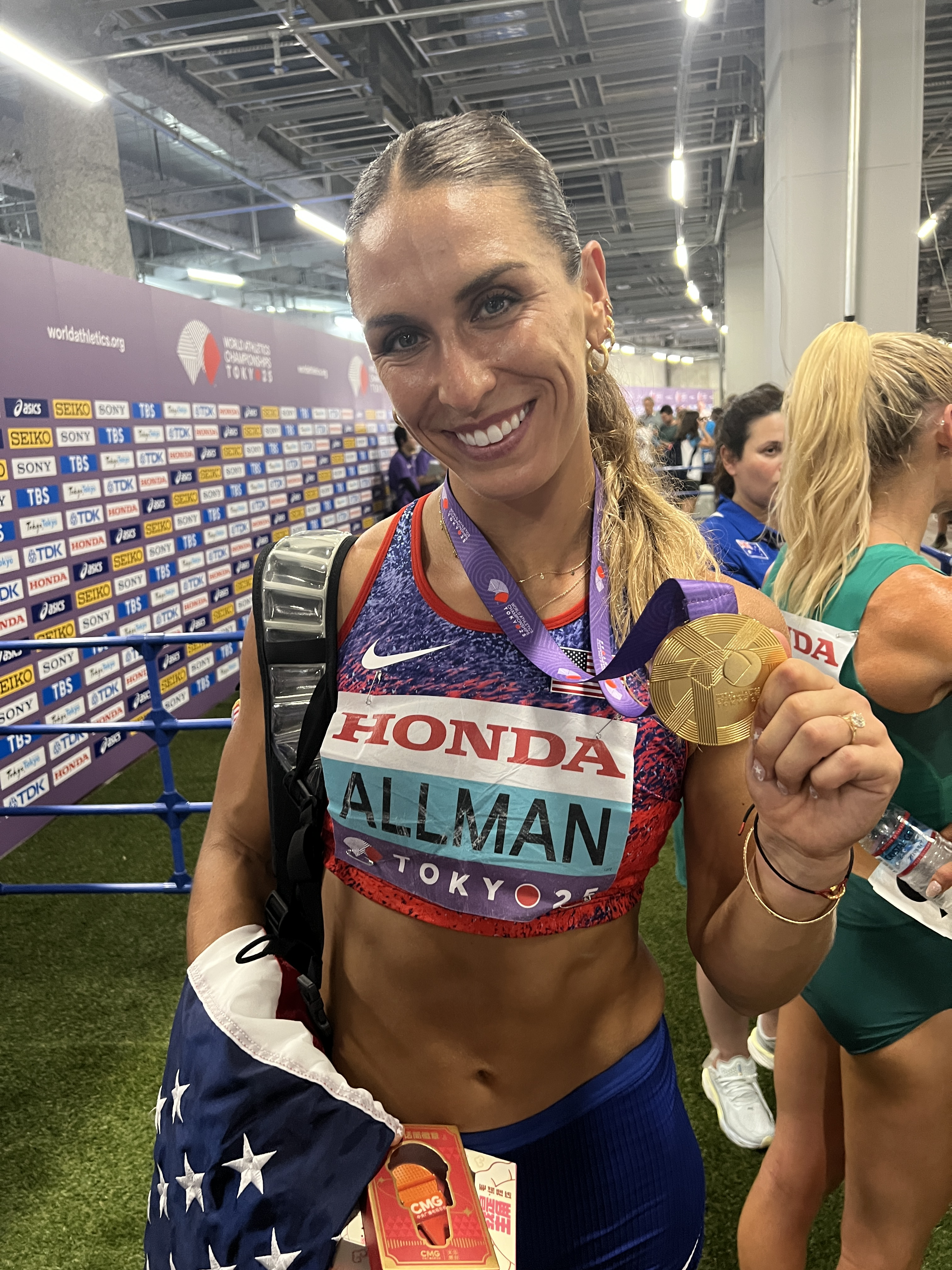
- Allman in 2025

Personal information
- Full name: Valarie Carolyn Allman-Sion
- Born: February 23, 1995 (age 31) Newark, Delaware, U.S.
- Home town: Longmont, Colorado, U.S.
- Education: Stanford University
- Height: 6 ft 1 in (185 cm)

Sport
- Country: United States
- Sport: Track and field
- Event: Discus throw
- College team: Stanford Cardinal
Medal record
Women's athletics
Representing the United States
Olympic Games
Gold medal – first place	2020 Tokyo	Discus throw
Gold medal – first place	2024 Paris	Discus throw
World Championships
Gold medal – first place	2025 Tokyo	Discus throw
Silver medal – second place	2023 Budapest	Discus throw
Bronze medal – third place	2022 Eugene	Discus throw
Diamond League
First place	2021	Discus throw
First place	2022	Discus throw
First place	2023	Discus throw
First place	2024	Discus throw
First place	2025	Discus throw
NACAC Championships in Athletics
Silver medal – second place	2018 Toronto	Discus
World Junior Championships in Athletics
Silver medal – second place	2014 Eugene	Discus
Universiade
Silver medal – second place	2017 Taipei	Discus

Valarie Carolyn Allman-Sion (born February 23, 1995) is an American track and field athlete specializing in the discus throw. She is a two time Olympic champion, having won the gold medal at the 2021 Tokyo Olympics and 2024 Paris Olympics. Allman won the gold medal at the 2025 World Athletics Championships held in Tokyo.

She also won bronze at the 2022 World Athletics Championships, making her the first American woman to win a world championship medal in the discus throw, and later a silver medal at the 2023 World Championships. She is the North American record holder for the event.

== Personal life ==
Allman was born in Christiana Hospital in Newark, Delaware and raised in Hershey, Pennsylvania. She graduated from Silver Creek High School in Longmont, Colorado in 2013. She then graduated from Stanford University in 2017 with a B.S. in product design.

== Career ==
Allman was a seven-time All-American at Stanford University. She went on to represent her country at the 2017 Summer Universiade, where she won a silver medal, and the 2017 World Championships, where she did not qualify for the final. She was the 2018 National Champion. In addition, she won a bronze medal at the 2018 Athletics World Cup and silver at the 2018 NACAC Championships. She won a gold medal at the 2021 Summer Olympics. At the 2022 World Athletics Championships, she won a bronze medal, which made her the first American woman to win a world championship medal in the discus throw. At the 2024 Summer Olympics in Paris, she won a gold medal.

Allman's personal best in the discus event is 73.52 m (241 ft 2 1/4 in), set at the Oklahoma Throws Series World Invitational in Ramona, OK on April 12, 2025. This was the 10th longest woman's throw in history trailing throws by only five other women, extends her American record, and reclaims the North American record.

She now resides in Austin, Texas and trains under Coach Zebulon Sion at the University of Texas, where she is a volunteer assistant. She was sponsored by Oiselle through 2020, as well as the New York Athletic Club. She is currently sponsored by Asics.

== Achievements ==
=== Personal bests ===
- Discus throw – 73.52 m (241 ft 2 1/4 in) (Ramona 2025) North American record

=== International competitions ===
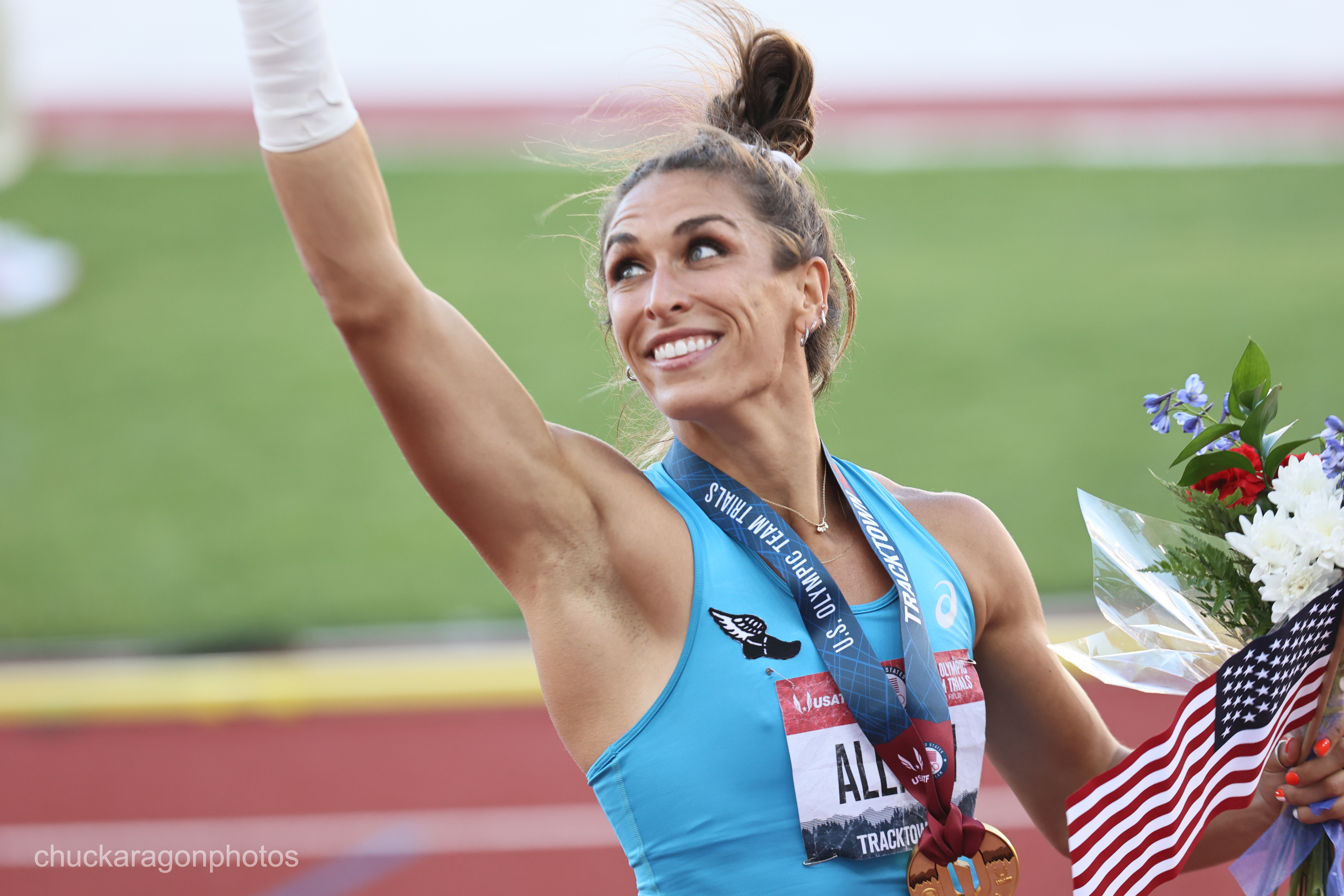
Allman in 2021.

Representing the United States
Year	Competition	Venue	Position	Event	Result
2014	World Junior Championships	Eugene, United States	2nd	Discus	56.75 m (186 ft 2 1/4 in)
2015	Universiade	Gwangju, South Korea	5th	Discus	55.68 m (182 ft 8 in)
2017	World Championships	London, United Kingdom	28th (q)	Discus	53.85 m (176 ft 8 in)
2017	Universiade	Taipei, Taiwan	2nd	Discus	58.36 m (191 ft 5 1/2 in)
2018	World Cup	London, United Kingdom	3rd	Discus	61.10 m (200 ft 5 1/2 in)
2018	NACAC Championships	Toronto, Canada	2nd	Discus	59.67 m (195 ft 9 in)
2019	World Championships	Doha, Qatar	7th	Discus	61.82 m (202 ft 10 in)
2021	Olympic Games	Tokyo, Japan	1st	Discus	68.98 m (226 ft 4 in)
2022	World Championships	Eugene, United States	3rd	Discus	68.30 m (224 ft 1 in)
2023	World Championships	Budapest, Hungary	2nd	Discus	69.23 m (227 ft 2 in)
2024	Olympic Games	Paris, France	1st	Discus	69.50 m (228 ft 0 in)
2025	World Championships	Tokyo, Japan	1st	Discus	69.48 m (227 ft 11 in)
