= 2026 African Championships in Athletics – Women's discus throw =

Women's discus throw at the 2026 African Championships in Athletics
- Venue: Legon Sports Stadium
- Location: Accra, Ghana
- Dates: 12 May
- Competitors: 7 from 6 nations
- Winning time: 57.00

Medalists
| gold medal | Nora Monie | Cameroon |
| silver medal | Divine Oladipo | Nigeria |
| bronze medal | Obiageri Amaechi | Nigeria |

The women's discus throw event at the 2026 African Championships in Athletics was held on 12 May in Accra, Ghana.

== Results ==
| Rank | Athlete | Nationality | #1 | #2 | #3 | #4 | #5 | #6 | Result | Notes |
|---|---|---|---|---|---|---|---|---|---|---|
| 1st place, gold medalist(s) | Nora Monie | Cameroon | | | | | | | 57.00 | |
| 2nd place, silver medalist(s) | Divine Oladipo | Nigeria | | | | | | | 55.37 | |
| 3rd place, bronze medalist(s) | Obiageri Amaechi | Nigeria | | | | | | | 53.32 | |
| 4 | Colette Uys | South Africa | | | | | | | 52.58 | |
| 5 | Caroline Cherotich | Kenya | | | | | | | 50.52 | |
| 6 | Nondjignon Brigitte Tchede | Benin | | | | | | | 44.37 | |
| 7 | Alemitu Teklesilassie | Ethiopia | | | | | | | 42.59 | |
| | Soraia Ruas | Angola | | | | | | | DNS | |
