= Croatia at the 2009 World Championships in Athletics =

- WA code: CRO
- National federation: Croatian Athletics Federation
- Website: www.has.hr

in Berlin
- Competitors: 5
- Medals: Gold 1 Silver 0 Bronze 0 Total 1

World Championships in Athletics appearances
- 1993; 1995; 1997; 1999; 2001; 2003; 2005; 2007; 2009; 2011; 2013; 2015; 2017; 2019; 2022; 2023

Other related appearances
- Yugoslavia (1983–1991)

Croatia competed at the 2009 World Championships in Athletics from 15 to 23 August. A team of 5 athletes was announced in preparation for the competition. Selected athletes have achieved one of the competition's qualifying standards. Blanka Vlašić defended her high jump world title.

== Team selection ==
Croatian team at the 2009 World Championships was selected by Siniša Ergotić, director of the Croatian Athletics Federation. Two out of five athletes qualified by meeting the A standard: Blanka Vlašić and Sandra Perković. Except for Sandra Perković, all athletes in the Croatian team had prior experience from major athletics competitions (European Championships, World Championships, or Olympic Games).

Jurica Grabušić also qualified by meeting the 110 meter hurdles B standard, but decided against competing after consultations with his coach.

| Event | Athletes | |
| Event | Men | Women |
|---|---|---|
| High jump | | Blanka Vlašić |
| Shot put | Nedžad Mulabegović | |
| Discus throw | | Sandra Perković; Vera Begić |
| Hammer throw | András Haklits | |

== Results ==
=== Men ===
Nedžad Mulabegović fell short of his season's best of 20.08 m by approximately one meter, and did not advance to the shot put final.

András Haklits advanced to the hammer throw final by improving on his season's best of 76.28 m. His best throw in the final was only slightly shorter, which was good enough for 7th place, and the greatest success of his career.

| Event | Athletes | Qualification | | Final | |
| Event | Athletes | Result | Rank | Result | Rank |
|---|---|---|---|---|---|
| Shot put | Nedžad Mulabegović | 19.15 | 14 | did not advance | |
| Hammer throw | András Haklits | 76.39 | 9 q | 76.26 | 7 |

=== Women ===
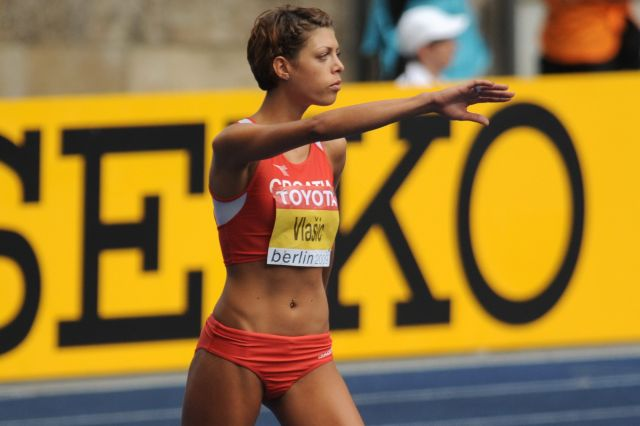
Blanka Vlašić at the World Championships in Berlin

Blanka Vlašić came to the World Championships with a season's best of 2.05 m, edged by world leading 2.06 m set by her main rival and home crowd favorite Ariane Friedrich, who had beaten Vlašić at the European Athletics Indoor Championships earlier that year.

Despite a warmup accident on the morning of high jump qualification, when Vlašić hit her head on the door frame and sustained a head injury that required stitches, she made the qualifying height without problems.

In the high jump final, Vlašić was one of three athletes to clear 2.02 m, and the only athlete to clear 2.04 m, pushing Chicherova and Friedrich to second and third respectively, and thus successfully defending her world title. She celebrated the victory in an emotional way, saying later that winning the gold medal was "one of the hardest things I have done in my career", and was "not comparable with [winning the World Championships in] Osaka".

Sandra Perković was, at age 19, the youngest discus thrower at the championships, including the qualifiers. Less than a month prior, she had won a gold medal at the 2009 European Athletics Junior Championships with a throw of 62.44 m, meeting the A standard, and breaking the national record held by her national team colleague Vera Begić. In Berlin, Perković made the final with a 62.16 m qualifying mark. In the final, she made only one legal throw of 60.77 m out of three attempts, and finished 9th.

Vera Begić's qualifying discus throw of 58.25 m was well short of her personal and season's best of 61.52 m, and was only good enough for 24th place.

| Event | Athletes | Qualification | | Final | |
| Event | Athletes | Result | Rank | Result | Rank |
|---|---|---|---|---|---|
| High jump | Blanka Vlašić | 1.95 | 1 Q | 2.04 | Gold medal |
| Discus throw | Sandra Perković | 62.16 | 6 Q | 60.77 | 9 |
| Discus throw | Vera Begić | 58.25 | 24 | did not advance | |
