= Croatia at the 2019 World Athletics Championships =

- WA code: CRO
- National federation: Croatian Athletics Federation
- Website: has.hr (in Croatian)

in Doha, Qatar 27 September 2019 – 6 October 2019
- Competitors: 9 in 6 events
- Medals Ranked 31st: Gold 0 Silver 0 Bronze 1 Total 1

World Athletics Championships appearances
- 1993; 1995; 1997; 1999; 2001; 2003; 2005; 2007; 2009; 2011; 2013; 2015; 2017; 2019; 2022; 2023

Other related appearances
- Yugoslavia (1983–1991)

Croatia competed at the 2019 World Athletics Championships in Doha, Qatar, from 27 September to 6 October 2019.

== Medalists ==
Medal	Name	Event	Date
Bronze	Sandra Perković	Women's discus throw	4 October

== Results ==
Key

- Q = Qualified for the next round
- q = Qualified for the next round as a fastest loser or, in field events, by position without achieving the qualifying target
- NR = National record
- PB = Personal best
- SB = Season best
- N/A = Round not applicable for the event

=== Men ===
Field events

Athlete	Event	Qualification		Final	
Athlete	Event	Distance	Position	Distance	Position
Filip Mihaljević	Shot put	21.00	9 Q	20.48	11

=== Women ===
Track and road events

Athlete	Event	Final	
Athlete	Event	Result	Rank
Bojana Bjeljac	Marathon	DNF	–
Matea Parlov Koštro	Marathon	DNF	–
Nikolina Šustić	Marathon	DNS	–
Ivana Renić	50 kilometres walk	DNF	–

Field events

Athlete	Event	Qualification		Final	
Athlete	Event	Distance	Position	Distance	Position
Ana Šimić	High jump	1.92	12 q	1.93	7
Sandra Perković	Discus throw	65.20	3 Q	66.72	3rd place, bronze medalist(s)
Marija Tolj	Discus throw	NM	–	Did not advance	
Sara Kolak	Javelin throw	60.99	11 q	62.28	7
