= Melany del Pilar Matheus =

Cuban track athlete (born 2001)

Melany del Pilar Matheus Morejón (born 19 January 2001) is a Cuban track and field athlete who specializes in the discus throw. At the 2021 Junior Pan-American Games, Matheus got a silver medal in the discus throw. Matheus represented Cuba at the 2024 Summer Olympics, placing 19th in the women's discus throw.
