= Croatia at the 2011 World Championships in Athletics =

- WA code: CRO
- National federation: Croatian Athletics Federation
- Website: www.has.hr

in Daegu
- Competitors: 6
- Medals: Gold 0 Silver 1 Bronze 0 Total 1

World Championships in Athletics appearances
- 1993; 1995; 1997; 1999; 2001; 2003; 2005; 2007; 2009; 2011; 2013; 2015; 2017; 2019; 2022; 2023

Other related appearances
- Yugoslavia (1983–1991)

Croatia competed at the 2011 World Championships in Athletics from August 27 to September 4 in Daegu, South Korea. A team of 6 athletes represented the country in the event. The team was led by defending high jump champion and medal hope Blanka Vlašić.

== Team selection ==
Most members of the Croatian team qualified for the World Championships by meeting the A standards in their respective events. In men's discus throw, Martin Marić surpassed the A standard in April 2011, followed by Roland Varga, national record holder in the same event, who did so in June. Hammer thrower András Haklits qualified in mid-August with a throw of 75.77 m, good enough to meet the B standard.

A notable absence from the World Championships was Sandra Perković, the reigning European champion in discus throw and thus an automatic qualifier. She set a then-world-leading mark of 67.96 m in February 2011, but subsequently received a six-month suspension for testing positive to methylhexanamine, a banned psychostimulant, and was forced to miss the championships.

Discus thrower Vera Begić met the B standard, but was not selected for the World Championships.

== Medalists ==
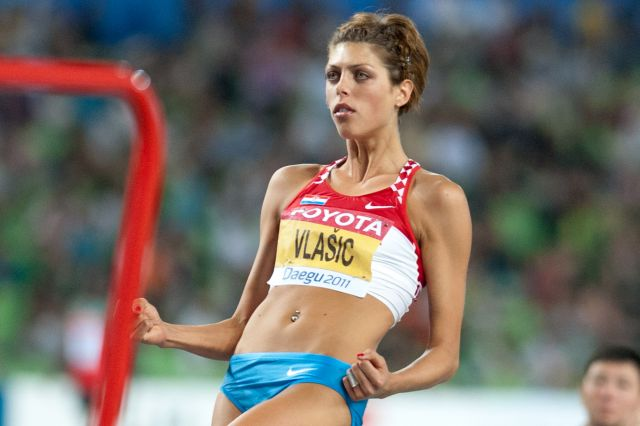
Blanka Vlašić won the high jump silver medal in Daegu.

The following Croatian competitor won a medal at the Championships

Medal	Athlete	Event
Silver	Blanka Vlašić	High jump

== Results ==
=== Men ===
In the hammer throw qualification on August 27, András Haklits made only one legal throw of 70.93 m, which was sufficient for 14th place in his qualification group and 25th place overall. Haklits stated he was "depressed" over his failure to reach the final, ascribing the poor showing to an adductor injury he had sustained one week before the championships. He said that his leg was "good enough for a half-an-hour training session", but anything longer than that was "impossible".

In the discus throw qualification on August 29, Martin Marić and Roland Varga were both far from their best. Marić's mark was five meters shorter than his personal best, and Varga was shorter by eight meters, which was insufficient to qualify either of them for the final.

Athlete	Event	Preliminaries		Heats		Semifinals		Final	
Athlete	Event	Time Width Height	Rank	Time Width Height	Rank	Time Width Height	Rank	Time Width Height	Rank
Martin Marić	Discus throw	60.61	27					Did not advance	
Roland Varga	Discus throw	59.09	31					Did not advance	
András Haklits	Hammer throw	70.93	25					Did not advance	

=== Women ===
In the women's marathon on August 27, Lisa Stublić placed 27th with the time of 2:36:41. She started the race conservatively, then gradually progressed through the rankings: she was 42nd at 5 km and 10 km, 32nd at 20 km, and 30th at 40 km. In the end, Stublić was satisfied with her performance as her pre-race expectation was to finish around 30th place. She described the racing conditions as difficult, due to high humidity.

On August 29, Nikolina Horvat placed 7th in her 400 meters hurdles heat with the time of 56.60 s, not far from her personal best and national record of 56.28 s, and still sufficient to advance to the semifinals as one of the fastest losers. Her semifinal time on August 30 was slower, at 57.02 s, eventually placing her 22nd among 24 semifinalists. Horvat was pleased with her result, as this was the first time in her career that she entered a semifinal of a major competition, but stated that her semifinal performance was somewhat below her expectations. Horvat said that she had made more strides than usual due to an interference from a gust of wind at the last hurdle. She pointed out that she was - at 1.60 m (5 ft 3 in) - among the shortest 400 meters hurdlers in Daegu, which was the reason why she could not afford technical errors.

Athlete	Event	Preliminaries		Heats		Semifinals		Final	
Athlete	Event	Time Width Height	Rank	Time Width Height	Rank	Time Width Height	Rank	Time Width Height	Rank
Lisa Christina Stublić	Marathon							2:36:41	27
Nikolina Horvat	400 m hurdles			56.60 q	23	57.02	22	Did not advance	
Blanka Vlašić	High jump	1.95	1					2.03 SB	2nd place, silver medalist(s)
