= Obiageri Amaechi =

Nigerian discus thrower (born 1999)

Personal information
- Full name: Obiageri Pamela Amaechi
- Born: March 12, 1999 (age 27) San Francisco, California, U.S.

Sport
- Country: United States; Nigeria
- Sport: Athletics
- Event: Discus throw
- College team: Princeton Tigers

Achievements and titles
- Olympic finals: 2024
- Regional finals: 2022
- Commonwealth finals: 2022
Medal record
Women's athletics
Representing Nigeria
Commonwealth Games
Bronze medal – third place	2022 Birmingham	Discus throw
African Games
Gold medal – first place	2023 Accra	Discus throw
African Championships
Silver medal – second place	2024 Douala	Discus throw
Bronze medal – third place	2022 Port Louis	Discus throw
Bronze medal – third place	2026 Accra	Discus throw
Islamic Solidarity Games
Silver medal – second place	2025 Riyadh	Discus throw

Obiageri Pamela Amaechi (born March 12, 1999) is an American-born Nigerian discus thrower who won the discus event at the 2023 African Games and came third in the discus events at the 2022 Commonwealth Games and the 2022 African Championships in Athletics. She competed at the 2024 Summer Olympics, and has also competed for the Princeton Tigers in U.S. college athletics.

== Personal life ==
Amaechi is from San Francisco, California, U.S. She is of Nigerian descent.

== Career ==
In 2018, she won the ECAC/IC4A Outdoor Championship discus event, competing for Princeton Tigers. As of 2022, she was the Ivy League record holder in discus, and had received All-America honors twice. She competed for the United States at the 2018 IAAF World U20 Championships, where she finished 14th in the qualifying round, and did not qualify for the final.

Amaechi made her debut for Nigeria at the 2022 African Championships in Athletics, finishing third in the discus event. Later that month, she won the Nigerian National Championships event, which was also a qualifier for the 2022 Commonwealth Games. She came third in the discus event at the Commonwealth Games. Later in the year, she came third at a Nigerian Sports Festival. Amaechi was one of three Nigerians who competed in the discus event at the 2023 World Athletics Championships.

Amaechi won the discus event at the 2023 African Games. On May 19, 2024, she threw a personal best 63.17 metres on at an event in Oklahoma, U.S., which was the second best throw by a Nigerian ever. Later in the year, she came second in the discus event at the 2024 African Championships in Athletics. At the 2024 African Championships in Athletics, she came second in the discus throw event.

Amaechi represented Nigeria at the 2024 Summer Olympics in Paris; she missed the final and finished 32nd overall. Amaechi competed at the 2025 World Athletics Championships, where she was eliminated in the first round. Later in the year, she finished second in the discus event at the 2025 Islamic Solidarity Games with a best throw of 56.99 metres, which was 5 centimetres (2.0 in) away from Nora Monie's winning throw at the Games.
