= Ashley Anumba =

Nigerian-American athlete (born 1999)

Personal information
- Nationality: American, Nigerian
- Born: 11 June 1999 (age 27) California, U.S.
- Height: 1.71 m (5 ft 7 in)

Sport
- Country: Nigeria
- Sport: Athletics
- Event: Discus

Achievements and titles
- Personal bests: Discus: 61.56 (Rathrum, 2023); Shot Put: 16.19 (Raleigh, 2023)
Medal record
Representing Nigeria
African Championships
Gold medal – first place	2024 Douala	Discus throw

Ashley Anumba (born 11 June 1999) is a track and field athlete who competes in the discus. Born in the United States, she represents Nigeria internationally.

== Early life ==
Anumba attended Los Osos High School in the United States, in the city of Rancho Cucamonga in Southern California's Inland Empire. She was named the All-Inland Valley Girls Track and Field Athlete of the Year in 2017 and that year became the California state Discus champion. In 2018 she enrolled at the University of Pennsylvania, where she majored in Health and Societies with a concentration in Health Policy and Law, graduating magna cum laude in 2021. She then started at the University of Virginia School of Law.

== Career ==
Anumba first represented Nigeria in the Discus at the 2019 African Games held in Rabat, in which she finished fourth.

In December 2022, she competed on Nigerian soil for the first time, winning the Discus event at the Nigerian National Sports Festival in Asaba, and in the process beating the 2022 Commonwealth Games champion, Chioma Onyekwere into second place. To do this she threw a personal best distance of 59.06m.

In March 2023, she set a new personal best discus throw of 59.63m at the Raleigh Relays at the Paul Derr Track and Field Facility.

Anumba threw a Discus over 60m for the first time in 2023, throwing 60.97 at the Tucson Elite Classic. In June 2023, representing the University of Virginia, Anumba competed at the NCAA Championships held in Austin, Texas, winning a silver medal in the Discus. To achieve this, Anumba set a new personal best distance of 61.13m, it was also a new school record.

In June 2023, at the Iron Woods Throw Classic, in Idaho, Anumba improved her personal best again, winning the event with a throw of 61.56m.

She competed at the 2024 Summer Olympics in Paris.

== Personal life ==
A dual-citizen of Nigeria and the United States, her father, Cyril Anumba died when she was ten years-old. Her mother, Ethel, is a principal. She has three siblings, including an older sister Michelle, who competed in track and field whilst at Duke University.
