= Laulauga Tausaga =

American discus thrower (born 1998)

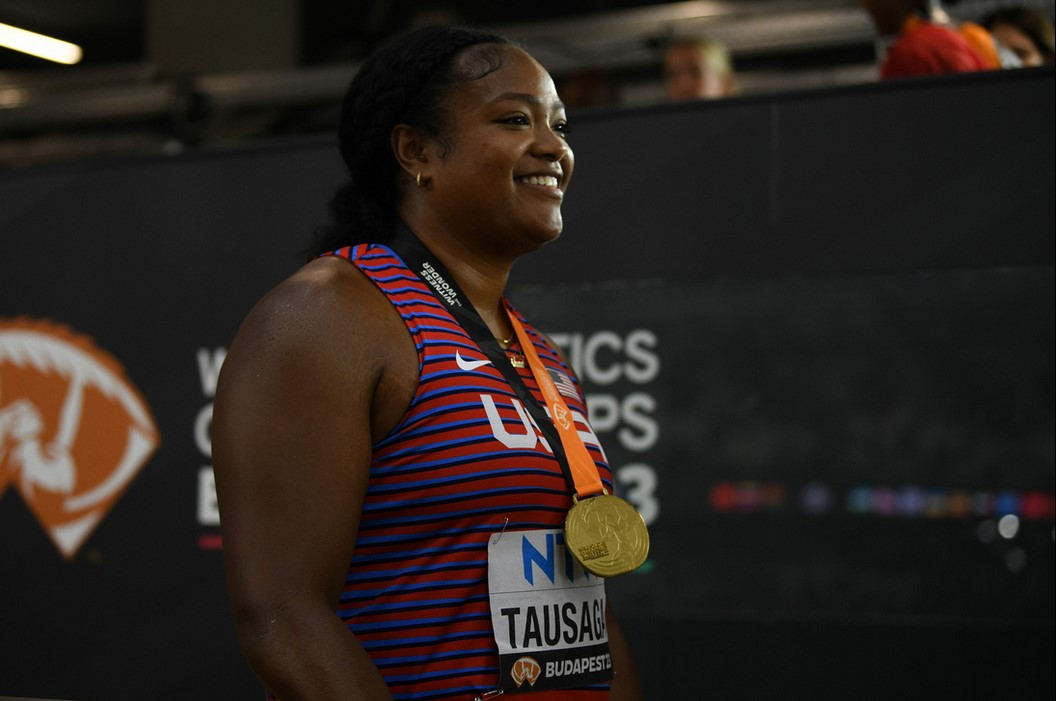

Personal information
- Nickname: Lagi Tausaga
- Born: May 22, 1998 (age 28) Hawaii, U.S.
- Home town: Spring Valley, San Diego County, California, United States

Sport
- Sport: Athletics
- Events: Discus throw Shot Put; Hammer
- College team: University of Iowa
- Club: Chula Vista Elite Athlete Training Center
Medal record
Women's athletics
Representing the United States
World Championships
Gold medal – first place	2023 Budapest	Discus throw
NACAC Championships
Gold medal – first place	2022 Freeport	Discus
NACAC U23 Championships in Athletics
Silver medal – second place	2019 Queretaro	Discus
Pan American U20 Athletics Championships
Gold medal – first place	2017 Trujillo	Discus

Laulauga Tausaga-Collins (born May 22, 1998 in Hawaii) is an American discus thrower. With a personal best throw (at the time) of 69.49m , she won the gold medal at the 2023 World Athletics Championships. She also won the gold medal at the 2022 NACAC Championships. On April 12, 2025, she threw her current personal best of 70.72m to finish 2nd at the Oklahoma Throws Series World Invitational.

== Professional ==
Tausaga made the women's discus final at 2019 and 2022 world championships, won silver medals in discus at the 2019 match and 2019 NACAC U-23 Championships. Tausaga won discus at 2017 Pan American U20 Athletics Championships.

She won the gold medal at the 2023 World Championships in Budapest with a fifth throw of 69.49 m that raised her personal best by more than four metres, after finishing 12 and last in the discus final at the previous two world athletics championships.

She failed to qualify for the 2024 US Olympic team by fouling all three of her attempts.

=== International ===
Year	Competition	Venue	Position	Event	Notes
Representing United States
2023	World Championships	Budapest, Hungary	1st	Discus	69.49 m (227 ft 11 3/4 in)
2022	2022 NACAC Championships	Freeport, Bahamas	1st	Discus	63.18 m (207 ft 3 1/4 in)
2022	World Championships	Eugene, United States	12th	Discus	56.47 m (185 ft 3 in)
2019	World Championships	Doha, Qatar	12th	Discus	63.94 m (209 ft 9 1/4 in)
2019	The Match Europe v USA	Minsk, Belarus	2nd	Discus	63.71 m (209 ft 1/4 in)
2019	2019 NACAC U23 Championships in Athletics	Queretaro, Mexico	2nd	Discus	59.37 m (194 ft 9 1/4 in)
2017	2017 Pan American U20 Athletics Championships	Trujillo, Peru	1st	Discus	59.29 m (194 ft 6 1/4 in)

=== USA National championships ===
Year	Competition	Venue	Position	Event	Notes
2017	USATF U20 Outdoor Championships	Sacramento, California	1st	Discus	60.65 m (198 ft 11 3/4 in)
2017	USA Outdoor Track and Field Championships	Sacramento, California	17th	Discus	Foul
2018	USA Outdoor Track and Field Championships	Des Moines, Iowa	15th	Shot put	15.55 m (51 ft 0 in)
2018	USA Outdoor Track and Field Championships	Des Moines, Iowa	3rd	Discus	60.65 m (198 ft 11 3/4 in)
2019	USA Outdoor Track and Field Championships	Des Moines, Iowa	3rd	Discus	62.08 m (203 ft 8 in)
2021	United States Olympic trials	Eugene, Oregon	24th	Discus	Foul
2022	USA Outdoor Track and Field Championships	Eugene, Oregon	2nd	Discus	64.49 m (211 ft 6 3/4 in)
2024	United States Olympic trials	Eugene, Oregon	24th	Discus	Foul

== University of Iowa ==
Laulauga Tausaga-Collins is a 2019 NCAA Discus champion, 8-time NCAA Division I All-American, 6-time Big Ten Conference champion, & 12-time All-Big Ten Conference scorer.

Year	Competition	Venue	Position	Event	Notes
Representing University of Iowa
2017	Big Ten Conference; Indoor Track and Field Championship	SPIRE Institute; Indoor Track & Field Facility	16th	Shot put	14.12 m (46 ft 3 3/4 in)
2017	Big Ten Conference; Outdoor Track and Field Championship	Penn State Nittany Lions; Outdoor Track & Field Facility	14th	Shot put	14.45 m (47 ft 4 3/4 in)
2017	Big Ten Conference; Outdoor Track and Field Championship	Penn State Nittany Lions; Outdoor Track & Field Facility	1st	Discus	55.00 m (180 ft 5 1/4 in)
2017	2017 NCAA Division I Outdoor Track and Field Championships	University of Oregon	7th	Discus	55.71 m (182 ft 9 1/4 in)
2018	Big Ten Conference; Indoor Track and Field Championship	SPIRE Institute; Indoor Track & Field Facility	11th	Shot put	15.51 m (50 ft 10 1/2 in)
2018	Big Ten Conference; Indoor Track and Field Championship	SPIRE Institute; Indoor Track & Field Facility	8th	Weight throw	20.03 m (65 ft 8 1/2 in)
2018	Big Ten Conference; Outdoor Track and Field Championship	Billy Hayes Track; Outdoor Track & Field Facility	1st	Shot put	16.80 m (55 ft 1 1/4 in)
2018	Big Ten Conference; Outdoor Track and Field Championship	Billy Hayes Track; Outdoor Track & Field Facility	1st	Discus	58.39 m (191 ft 6 3/4 in)
2018	2018 NCAA Division I Outdoor Track and Field Championships	University of Oregon	4th	Discus	56.07 m (183 ft 11 1/4 in)
2018	2018 NCAA Division I Outdoor Track and Field Championships	University of Oregon	4th	Shot put	17.34 m (56 ft 10 1/2 in)
2019	Big Ten Conference; Indoor Track and Field Championship	Stephen M. Ross Athletic Campus; Indoor Track & Field Facility	2nd	Shot put	17.79 m (58 ft 4 1/4 in)
2019	Big Ten Conference; Indoor Track and Field Championship	Stephen M. Ross Athletic Campus; Indoor Track & Field Facility	24th	Weight throw	Foul
2019	2019 NCAA Division I Indoor Track and Field Championships	Birmingham CrossPlex; Indoor Track & Field Facility	15th	Shot put	15.84 m (51 ft 11 1/2 in)
2019	2019 NCAA Division I Indoor Track and Field Championships	Birmingham CrossPlex; Indoor Track & Field Facility	5th	Weight throw	22.23 m (72 ft 11 in)
2019	Mt SAC Relays	Mt SAC Relays; Outdoor Track & Field Facility	1st	Hammer throw	61.34 m (201 ft 2 3/4 in)
2019	Beach Invitational	Long Beach State; Outdoor Track & Field Facility	1st	Shot put	18.02 m (59 ft 1 1/4 in)
2019	Big Ten Conference; Outdoor Track and Field Championship	Iowa Hawkeyes Track; Outdoor Track & Field Facility	3rd	Shot put	17.17 m (56 ft 3 3/4 in)
2019	Big Ten Conference; Outdoor Track and Field Championship	Iowa Hawkeyes Track; Outdoor Track & Field Facility	7th	Hammer throw	60.91 m (199 ft 10 in)
2019	Big Ten Conference; Outdoor Track and Field Championship	Iowa Hawkeyes Track; Outdoor Track & Field Facility	1st	Discus	60.28 m (197 ft 9 in)
2019	2019 NCAA Division I Outdoor Track and Field Championships	University of Texas	1st	Discus	63.26 m (207 ft 6 1/2 in)
2019	2019 NCAA Division I Outdoor Track and Field Championships	University of Texas	25th	Shot put	16.17 m (53 ft 1/2 in)
2020	Big Ten Conference; Indoor Track and Field Championship	SPIRE Institute; Indoor Track & Field Facility	2nd	Shot put	17.37 m (56 ft 11 3/4 in)
2020	Big Ten Conference; Indoor Track and Field Championship	SPIRE Institute; Indoor Track & Field Facility	1st	Weight throw	22.21 m (72 ft 10 1/4 in)
2021	Big Ten Conference; Outdoor Track and Field Championship	Illinois Fighting Illini Track; Outdoor Track & Field Facility	5th	Shot put	17.52 m (57 ft 5 3/4 in)
2021	Big Ten Conference; Outdoor Track and Field Championship	Illinois Fighting Illini Track; Outdoor Track & Field Facility	1st	Discus	62.09 m (203 ft 8 1/4 in)
2021	2021 NCAA Division I Outdoor Track and Field Championships	University of Oregon	2nd	Discus	63.53 m (208 ft 5 in)
2021	2021 NCAA Division I Outdoor Track and Field Championships	University of Oregon	6th	Shot put	17.29 m (56 ft 8 1/2 in)
