= Nora Monie =

Cameroonian athlete (born 1997)

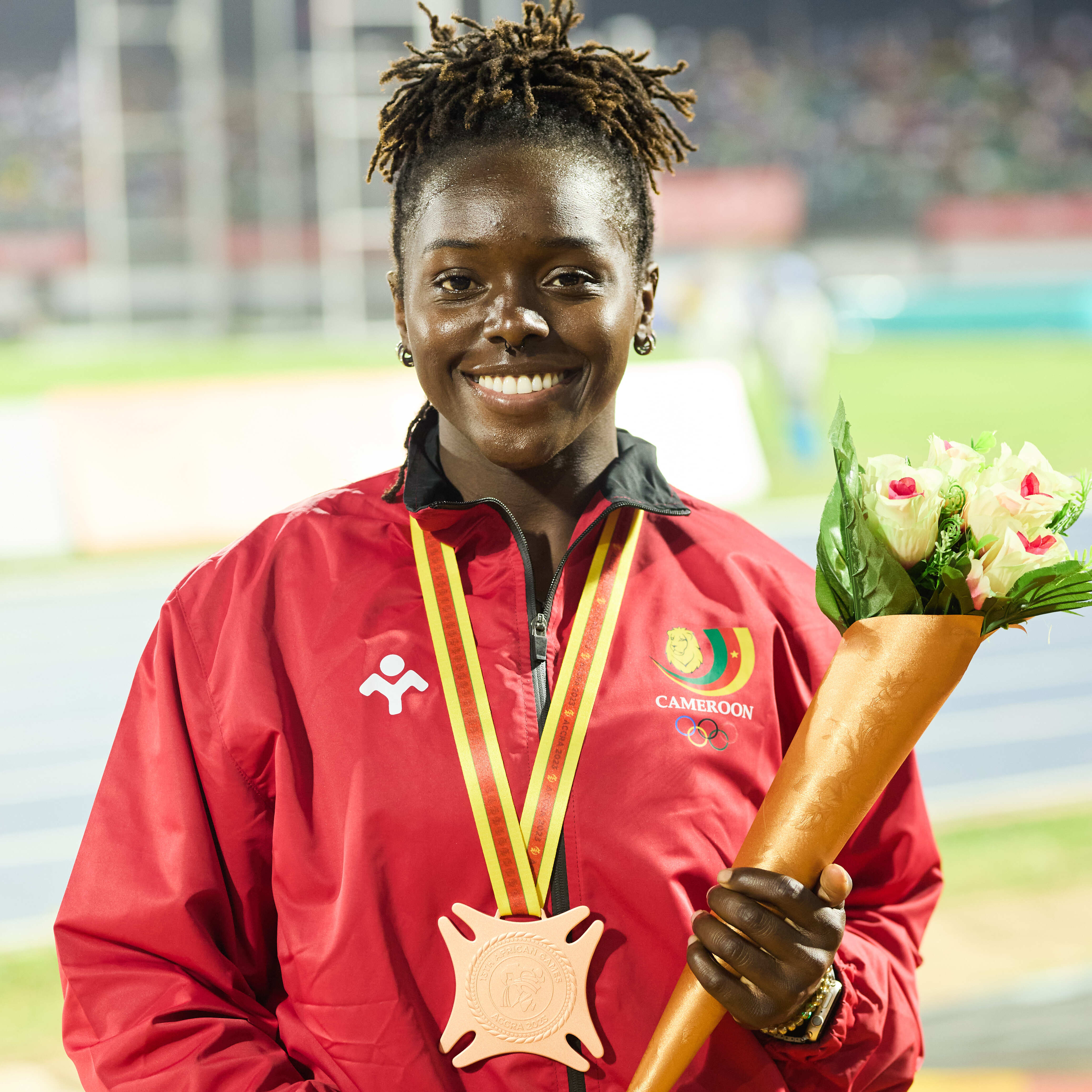
- Monie at the 2023 African Games

Personal information
- Full name: Nora Atim Monie
- Nationality: Cameroonian
- Born: 4 June 1997 (age 29)

Sport
- Sport: Athletics
- Event: Discus throw
Medal record
Women's athletics
Representing Cameroon
African Games
Bronze medal – third place	2023 Accra	Discus throw
Islamic Solidarity Games
Gold medal – first place	2025 Riyadh	Discus throw
African Championships
Gold medal – first place	2026 Accra	Discus throw
Silver medal – second place	2022 Port Louis	Discus throw
Jeux de la Francophonie
Gold medal – first place	2023 Kinshasa	Discus throw
Silver medal – second place	2023 Kinshasa	Shot put

Nora Atim Monie (born 4 June 1997) is a Cameroonian athlete specializing in discus throw. She is a medalist at the African Games, African Championships, and Islamic Solidarity Games.

== Early life and education ==
Monie was born to Paul and Claudia Monie. She attended Sharyland High School in Mission, Texas, where she was a track and field athete. During her senior year she was a regional champion in discus throw with a throw of 136.8 feet (41.7 m), and advanced to the state championship. At the UIL State Track and Field Championship, she was the winner in discus throw with a throw of 141.8 feet (43.2 m).

She then attended the University of Houston where she was a member of the track and field team.

== Career ==
Monie competed at the 2022 African Championships and won a silver medal in discus throw with a throw of 54.44 metres (178.6 ft). She then competed at the 2023 African Games and won a bronze medal in discus throw with a throw of 56.11 metres (184.1 ft).

In July 2025, she set a national record for Cameroon in discus throw with a distance of 61.33 metres (201.2 ft). In November 2025, she competed at the 2025 Islamic Solidarity Games and won a gold medal in the discus throw with an Islamic Solidarity Games record throw of 57.04 metres (187.1 ft).
