= Chioma Onyekwere =

Nigerian-American track and field athlete (born 1994)

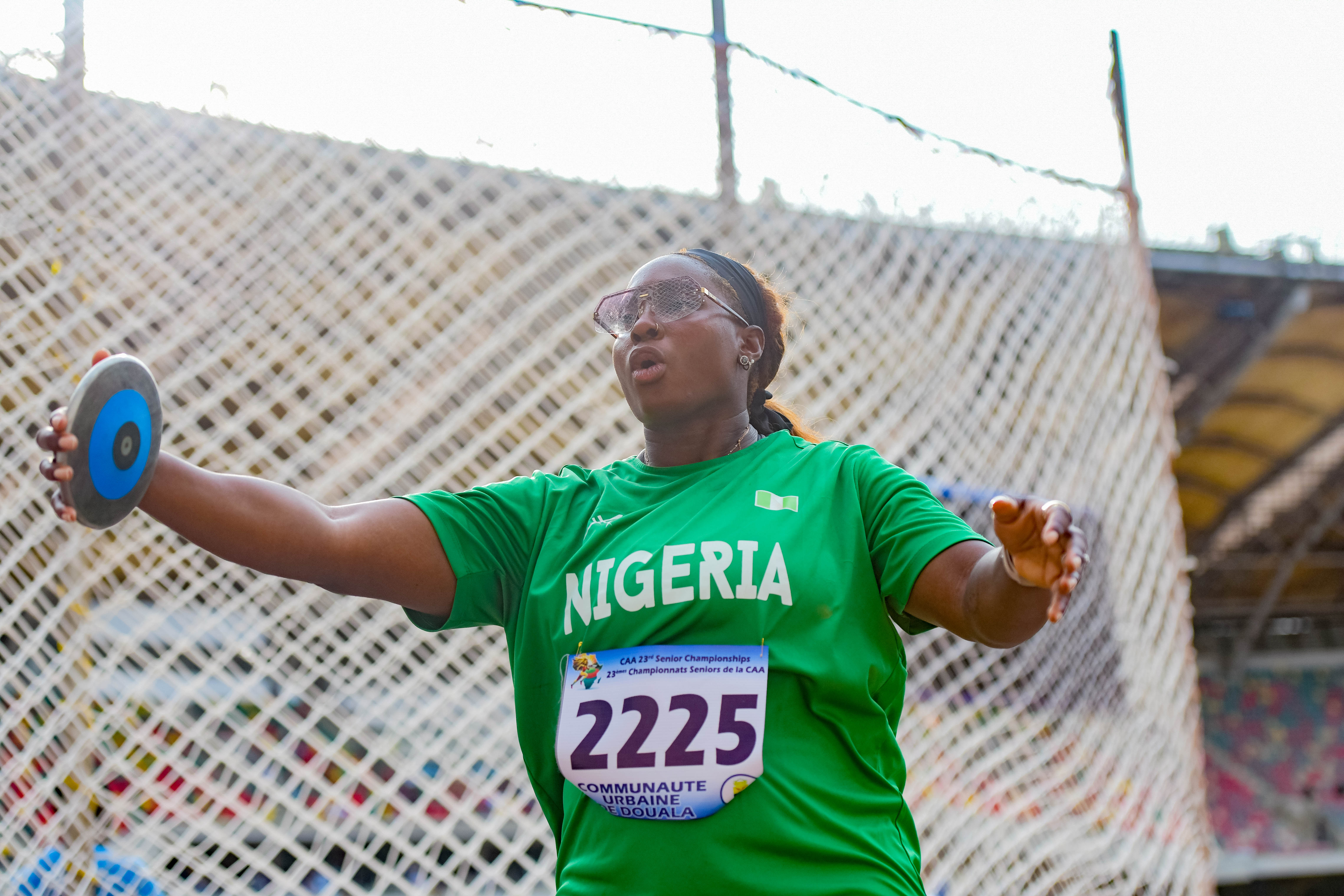
- Onyekwere in 2024

Personal information
- Full name: Chioma Chukwujindu Onyekwere
- Nickname: CiCi
- Nationality: American, Nigerian
- Born: 28 June 1994 (age 32) Lansing, Michigan, U.S.
- Height: 1.77 m (5 ft 10 in)

Sport
- Country: Nigeria
- Sport: Athletics
- Events: Shotput, discus throw
Medal record
Women's athletics
Representing Nigeria
African Championships
Gold medal – first place	2018 Asaba	Discus throw
Bronze medal – third place	2016 Durban	Shot put
Bronze medal – third place	2016 Durban	Discus throw

Chioma Chukwujindu "CiCi" Onyekwere (born 28 June 1994) is a track and field athlete specializing in the discus throw. Born in the United States, she represents Nigeria. She has competed in the shotput and discus throw both on the collegiate and international levels. She holds the African and Nigerian record for the discus throw. Her personal best of 64.96 meters for the discus throw was achieved in 2023.

She has won a gold medal for the Discus Throw at the 2022 Commonwealth Games. She has won 3 African Titles over her career, 2 consecutive gold medals at the African Championships (2018 & 2022) and a gold medal at the 2019 African Games. She was recognized for her academic achievement as a student athlete at the University of Maryland for four years by the Big Ten and the ACC while serving as one of the team's captains. Her collegiate honors include All-American recognition, All-Big Ten honors, All-Academic Big Ten, 5 Big Ten Conference Medals, and Solomon Eye Terp of the Week recipient.

== Personal ==
Born to Chima & Scholar Onyekwere with triplet siblings and two older siblings. Onyekwere grew up in Nigeria and moved to Fairfax, Virginia with her family. She graduated from the A. James Clark School of Engineering at the University of Maryland in Winter 2016 with a Bachelor of Science degree in Mechanical Engineering.

== Career ==
=== Pre-Collegiate ===
Onyekwere attended James W. Robinson High School in Fairfax, VA. She competed under the guidance of former University of Maryland Thrower Beau Fay. Onyekwere was not only District Champion several times but she is also a 2-time district record holder in the shot put. She claimed Regional Champion in 2011 and 2012, 3rd in the state in 2011 & 2012, and placed 5th in Nationals in 2012 .

=== University of Maryland ===
Chioma enrolled at the University of Maryland in the Fall 2012 where she joined the Track and Field team coached by former US Olympian Andrew Valmon.

In 2015, Onyekwere won her first collegiate medal in Maryland's first season in the Big Ten Conference. At the 2015 Big Ten Indoor Track and Field Championships, Onyekwere earned a silver medal in the Shotput with her top throw of 16.06 meters (52’ 8.25”). She was awarded 2nd Team All-Big Ten honors for the indoor season. Her shotput dominance carried over into the outdoor season as she earned a bronze medal in the Big Ten Outdoor Track & Field Championships with a top mark of 16.10 meters (52’ 10”). She added a Top 10 conference finish at this meet by placing 7th in the Discus throw.

Onyekwere capped off her final Big Ten Indoor Track & Field Championship in 2016 by earning a silver medal in the Weight Throw. Her top mark of 21.17 meters (69’ 5.5”) was not only a personal best, but it also broke a school record that had previously stood for 14 years. She placed 6th for the Shotput at this meet as well. Along with earning 2nd Team All-Big Ten honors for the second straight year, her record-breaking throw also qualified her for the 2016 NCAA Division I Indoor Track & Field National Championships. Her performance at this championship was good enough for her to be awarded as a 2nd Team All-American for the 2016 Indoor Season.

Her dominance continued as her final outdoor season went underway. At the UVA Quad Meet in Charlottesville, VA, Onyekwere broke a 34-year school record in the Discus Throw with a toss of 52.40 meters (171’ 11”). She would go on to reset this Discus record at the Big Ten Outdoor Track and Field Championships with a throw of 54.43 meters (178’ 7”). This throw resulted in a bronze medal. Onyekwere also threw a career-best shotput throw of 16.85 meters (55’ 3.5”) earning a silver medal, her 5th Big Ten Medal, and 2nd Team Big-Ten Honors once again. She went on to compete at the NCAA East Regional Championships for both the Shotput and Discus where her 11th-place finish in the Shotput qualified her for the NCAA Outdoor T&F Championships. At season's end, she was awarded as an All-American Honorable Mention for the 2016 Outdoor Season.

=== Post-Collegiate ===
As a member of the Nigerian Senior National Track and Field Team, Onyekwere was selected to compete in the 2016 African Championships in Athletics in Durban, South Africa. She would go on to earn two bronze medals at these games. She helped complete a Nigerian-podium sweep by placing 3rd in the Discus with a top throw of 53.91 meters behind teammates Nwanneka Okwelogu and Chinwe Okoro. She also placed 3rd in the Shot put with a top throw of 15.71 meters.

In the 2018 African Championships in Athletics held in Asaba, Nigeria, Onyekwere decided to focus her efforts solely on the Discus throw. This paid off as she put on a show for her home country, earning a Gold Medal the Discus throw with a then personal best throw of 58.09 meters. Onyekwere was invited to represent Team Africa in the 2018 IAAF Continental Cup held in Ostrava, Czech Republic. She finished in 4th place with a top throw of 56.68 meters and had the furthest mark of any African Discus thrower in the competition.

In 2019, she won the gold medal at the 2019 African Games in Rabat, Morocco. Her winning throw of 59.91 meters was also the African Games record the event. Onyekwere competed in the 2019 IAAF World Athletics Championship in Doha. She threw a personal best throw of 61.38 meters in the qualifying round and finished in 13th place, one spot shy of advancing to the finals.

In 2021, she broke the Nigerian National Record for the discus throw with throw of 63.30 meters. The previous record of 61.58 meters was set by Chinwe Okoro in 2016.

In 2022, she successfully defended her African Championship winning her 2nd consecutive gold medal in the Discus Throw at the 2022 African Championships in Athletics held in Saint Pierre, Mauritius with a top throw of 58.18 meters. After failing to reach the finals of the 2022 World Athletics Championships, she bounced back a couple weeks later at the 2022 Commonwealth Games finishing in first place with a throw of 61.70 meters. This throw was a season's best and helped her earn Nigeria's first ever women's Discus Throw title in the history of the Commonwealth Games.

In 2023, she broke the African Record for the Women's Discus with a throw of 64.96 meters achieved in April 2023. The previous African record was 64.87 meters set in 2007 by Elizna Naude of South Africa.

== International competitions ==
Note: Only the position and distance in the final are indicated, unless otherwise stated. (q) means the athlete did not qualify for the final, with the overall position and distance in the qualification round indicated.

Year	Competition	Venue	Position	Event	Notes
2016	African Championships	Durban, South Africa	3rd	Shot put	15.71 m
2016	African Championships	Durban, South Africa	3rd	Discus	53.91 m
2018	African Championships	Asaba, Nigeria	1st	Discus	58.09 m SB
2018	Continental Cup	Ostrava, Czech Republic	4th	Discus	56.68 m
2019	African Games	Rabat, Morocco	1st	Discus	59.91 m GR
2019	World Championships	Doha, Qatar	13th (q)	Discus	61.38 m SB
2022	African Championships	St. Pierre, Mauritius	1st	Discus	58.18 m
2022	World Championships	Eugene, Oregon	21st (q)	Discus	57.87 m
2022	Commonwealth Games	Birmingham, England	1st	Discus	61.70 m SB
2023	World Championships	Budapest, Hungary	21st (q)	Discus	58.58 m
2024	African Games	Accra, Ghana	2nd	Discus	58.03 m
2024	Olympic Games	Paris, France	21st (q)	Discus	60.78 m
2025	World Championships	Tokyo, Japan	20th (q)	Discus	59.45 m
2025	Islamic Solidarity Games	Riyadh, Saudi Arabia	4th	Discus	55.08 m

== International Titles ==
- African Championships in Athletics
  - Discus Throw: 2018, 2022
- African Games
  - Discus Throw: 2019
- Commonwealth Games
  - Discus Throw: 2022
