= United States at the 2022 World Athletics Championships =

- Flag of the United States
- WA code: USA
- National federation: USA Track & Field
- Website: usatf.org

in Eugene, Oregon July 15–24, 2022
- Competitors: 151 (73 men and 78 women) in 49 events
- Medals Ranked 1st: Gold 13 Silver 9 Bronze 11 Total 33

World Athletics Championships appearances (overview)
- 1976; 1980; 1983; 1987; 1991; 1993; 1995; 1997; 1999; 2001; 2003; 2005; 2007; 2009; 2011; 2013; 2015; 2017; 2019; 2022; 2023; 2025

The United States hosted at the 2022 World Athletics Championships in Eugene, Oregon, from 15–24 July 2022, marking the first ever track & field world championship in the U.S. The selection meet for these championships was the 2022 USA Outdoor Track and Field Championships. Team members were announced on July 5.

The United States won the first ever title of "World Team Champions", a trophy inaugurated by the IAAF during this championships.

== Medalists ==
Medal	Athlete	Event	Date
Gold	Chase Ealey	Women's shot put	16 July
Gold	Fred Kerley	Men's 100 metres	16 July
Gold	Brooke Andersen	Women's hammer throw	17 July
Gold	Katie Nageotte	Women's pole vault	17 July
Gold	Grant Holloway	Men's 110 metres hurdles	17 July
Gold	Ryan Crouser	Men's shot put	17 July
Gold	Noah Lyles	Men's 200 metres	21 July
Gold	Michael Norman	Men's 400 metres	22 July
Gold	Sydney McLaughlin	Women's 400 metres hurdles	22 July
Gold	Aleia Hobbs*; Melissa Jefferson; Jenna Prandini; Abby Steiner; Twanisha Terry	Women's 4 × 100 metres relay	23 July
Gold	Athing Mu	Women's 800 metres	24 July
Gold	Champion Allison; Trevor Bassitt*; Bryce Deadmon; Elija Godwin; Michael Norman; Vernon Norwood*	Men's 4 × 400 metres relay	24 July
Gold	Talitha Diggs; Allyson Felix*; Sydney McLaughlin; Abby Steiner; Jaide Stepter Baynes*; Kaylin Whitney*; Britton Wilson	Women's 4 × 400 metres relay	24 July
Silver	Marvin Bracy-Williams	Men's 100 metres	16 July
Silver	Sandi Morris	Women's pole vault	17 July
Silver	Trey Cunningham	Men's 110 metres hurdles	17 July
Silver	Joe Kovacs	Men's shot put	17 July
Silver	Rai Benjamin	Men's 400 metres hurdles	19 July
Silver	Kenny Bednarek	Men's 200 metres	21 July
Silver	Kara Winger	Women's javelin	22 July
Silver	Marvin Bracy-Williams; Christian Coleman; Elijah Hall; Noah Lyles	Men's 4 × 100 metres relay	23 July
Silver	Chris Nilsen	Men's pole vault	24 July
Bronze	Allyson Felix; Elija Godwin; Wadeline Jonathas*; Vernon Norwood; Kennedy Simon	Mixed 4 × 400 metre relay	15 July
Bronze	Trayvon Bromell	Men's 100 metres	16 July
Bronze	Janee' Kassanavoid	Women's hammer throw	17 July
Bronze	Josh Awotunde	Men's shot put	17 July
Bronze	Anna Hall	Women's heptathlon	18 July
Bronze	Tori Franklin	Women's triple jump	18 July
Bronze	Trevor Bassitt	Men's 400 metres hurdles	19 July
Bronze	Valarie Allman	Women's discus throw	20 July
Bronze	Erriyon Knighton	Men's 200 metres	21 July
Bronze	Dalilah Muhammad	Women's 400 metres hurdles	22 July
Bronze	Zach Ziemek	Men's decathlon	24 July

* – Indicates the athlete competed in preliminaries but not the final

== Results ==
=== Men ===
Track and road events

Athlete	Event	Heat		Semifinal		Final	
Athlete	Event	Result	Rank	Result	Rank	Result	Rank
Marvin Bracy-Williams	100 metres	10.05 (-0.1)	12 Q	9.93 (-0.1)	2 Q	9.88 (-0.1)	2nd place, silver medalist(s)
Trayvon Bromell	100 metres	9.89 (+0.6)	2 Q	9.97 (+0.3)	4 Q	9.88 (-0.1)	3rd place, bronze medalist(s)
Christian Coleman	100 metres	10.08 (+0.5)	15 Q	10.05 (+0.1)	6 Q	10.01 (-0.1)	6
Fred Kerley	100 metres	9.79 (+0.1)	1 Q	10.02 (+0.1)	5 Q	9.86 (-0.1)	1st place, gold medalist(s)
Kenny Bednarek	200 metres	20.35 (+0.5)	18 Q	19.84 (+1.1)	3 Q	19.77 (+0.4)	2nd place, silver medalist(s)
Fred Kerley	200 metres	20.17 (+0.4)	8 Q	20.68 (-0.1)	20	Did not advance	
Erriyon Knighton	200 metres	20.01 (+2.1)	=2 Q	19.77 (+0.3)	2 Q	19.80 (+0.4)	3rd place, bronze medalist(s)
Noah Lyles	200 metres	19.98 (-0.3)	1 Q	19.62 (+1.1)	1 Q	19.31 (+0.4) NR	1st place, gold medalist(s)
Champion Allison	400 metres	45.56	7 Q	44.71	3 Q	44.77	4
Michael Cherry	400 metres	45.81	14 Q	45.28	13	Did not advance	
Michael Norman	400 metres	45.37	4 Q	44.30	1 Q	44.29	1st place, gold medalist(s)
Donavan Brazier	800 metres	1:46.72	26	Did not advance			
Bryce Hoppel	800 metres	1:46.98	28	Did not advance			
Jonah Koech	800 metres	DQ		Did not advance			
Brandon Miller	800 metres	1:47.29	29	Did not advance			
Johnny Gregorek	1500 metres	3:35.65	6 Q	3:37.35	16	Did not advance	
Cooper Teare	1500 metres	3:41.15	38	Did not advance			
Josh Thompson	1500 metres	3:39.10	24 Q	3:35.55	7 q	3:35.57	12
Grant Fisher	5000 metres	13:24.44	10 Q	—N/a		13:11.65	6
Woody Kincaid	5000 metres	13:25.02	18	—N/a		Did not advance	
Abdihamid Nur	5000 metres	13:24.48	13 Q	—N/a		13:18.05	11
Grant Fisher	10,000 metres	—N/a				27:28.14	4
Joe Klecker	10,000 metres	—N/a				27:38.73	9
Sean McGorty	10,000 metres	—N/a				27:46.30	12
Elkanah Kibet	Marathon	—N/a				2:11:21	24
Colin Mickow	Marathon	—N/a				2:16:37	46
Galen Rupp	Marathon	—N/a				2:09.37	19
Devon Allen	110 metres hurdles	13.47 (+0.4)	14 Q	13.09 (+2.5)	4 Q	DQ	
Trey Cunningham	110 metres hurdles	13.28 (-0.5)	4 Q	13.07 (+0.3)	3 Q	13.08 (+1.2)	2nd place, silver medalist(s)
Grant Holloway	110 metres hurdles	13.14 (+0.4)	1 Q	13.01 (-0.6)	1 Q	13.03 (+1.2)	1st place, gold medalist(s)
Daniel Roberts	110 metres hurdles	DQ		Did not advance			
Trevor Bassitt	400 metres hurdles	49.17	6 Q	48.17	4 Q	47.39	3rd place, bronze medalist(s)
Rai Benjamin	400 metres hurdles	49.06	3 Q	48.44	7 Q	46.89	2nd place, silver medalist(s)
Khallifah Rosser	400 metres hurdles	48.62	1 Q	48.34	5 q	47.88	5
Hillary Bor	3000 metres steeplechase	8:20.18	12 Q	—N/a		8:29.77	8
Evan Jager	3000 metres steeplechase	8:18.44	6 Q	—N/a		8:29.08	6
Benard Keter	3000 metres steeplechase	8:21.94	17	—N/a		Did not advance	
Marvin Bracy-Williams; Christian Coleman; Elijah Hall; Noah Lyles	4 × 100 metres relay	37.87	1 Q	—N/a		37.55	2nd place, silver medalist(s)
Champion Allison; Trevor Bassitt*; Bryce Deadmon; Elija Godwin; Michael Norman; Vernon Norwood*	4 × 400 metres relay	2:58.96	1 Q	—N/a		2:56.17	1st place, gold medalist(s)
Nick Christie	20 kilometres walk	—N/a				1:28:28	31
Dan Nehnevaj	20 kilometres walk	—N/a				1:43:07	43
Nick Christie	35 kilometres walk	—N/a				2:41:08	36

* – Indicates the athlete competed in preliminaries but not the final

Field events

Athlete	Event	Qualification		Final	
Athlete	Event	Distance	Position	Distance	Position
Darius Carbin	High jump	2.17	25	Did not advance	
JuVaughn Harrison	High jump	2.28	7 q	2.27	9
Shelby McEwen	High jump	2.28	=9 q	2.30	5
Andrew Irwin	Pole vault	NH	–	Did not advance	
Chris Nilsen	Pole vault	5.75	=1 Q	5.94	2nd place, silver medalist(s)
Luke Winder	Pole vault	5.65	17	Did not advance	
Marquis Dendy	Long jump	8.16	2 Q	8.02	6
Steffin McCarter	Long jump	7.94	11 q	8.04	5
Will Williams	Long jump	7.83	17	Did not advance	
Chris Benard	Triple jump	16.53	16	Did not advance	
Will Claye	Triple jump	16.70	10 q	16.54	11
Donald Scott	Triple jump	16.84	8 q	17.14	6
Christian Taylor	Triple jump	16.48	18	Did not advance	
Josh Awotunde	Shot put	21.18	6 q	22.29	3rd place, bronze medalist(s)
Ryan Crouser	Shot put	22.28	1 Q	22.94 CR	1st place, gold medalist(s)
Joe Kovacs	Shot put	21.50	2 Q	22.89	2nd place, silver medalist(s)
Tripp Piperi	Shot put	21.03	8 q	20.93	8
Andrew Evans	Discus	62.20	18	Did not advance	
Sam Mattis	Discus	65.59	8 q	63.19	11
Brian Williams	Discus	58.25	28	Did not advance	
Ethan Dabbs	Javelin	72.81	27	Did not advance	
Tim Glover	Javelin	75.68	24	Did not advance	
Curtis Thompson	Javelin	81.73	8 q	78.39	11
Daniel Haugh	Hammer throw	79.34	2 Q	78.10	8
Rudy Winkler	Hammer throw	78.61	5 Q	78.99	6
Alex Young	Hammer throw	74.67	12 q	73.60	12

Combined events – Decathlon

Athlete	Event	100 m	LJ	SP	HJ	400 m	110H	DT	PV	JT	1500 m	Final	Rank
Steven Bastien	Result	10.93 (+1.1)	7.41	13.36	2.02	47.95	14.75 (+0.4)	38.46	4.70	55.80	4:40.92	7939	16
Steven Bastien	Points	876	913	689	822	912	880	633	819	675	675	7939	16
Kyle Garland	Result	10.69 (+0.8)	7.41	15.24	2.14	49.64	14.18 (+1.1)	45.44	4.60	53.23	4:58.94	8133	11
Kyle Garland	Points	931	913	804	934	831	951	776	790	637	566	8133	11
Zach Ziemek	Result	10.57 (+0.8)	7.70	15.37	2.08	49.56	14.47 (+1.5)	48.40	5.40	62.18	4:44.97	8676	3rd place, bronze medalist(s)
Zach Ziemek	Points	959	985	812	878	835	915	837	1035	771	649	8676	3rd place, bronze medalist(s)

=== Women ===
Track and road events

Athlete	Event	Heat		Semifinal		Final	
Athlete	Event	Result	Rank	Result	Rank	Result	Rank
Aleia Hobbs	100 metres	11.04 (+0.1)	9 Q	10.95 (+0.4)	7 Q	10.92 (+0.8)	6
Melissa Jefferson	100 metres	11.03 (-0.1)	8 Q	10.92 (-0.2)	5 q	11.03 (+0.8)	8
Twanisha Terry	100 metres	10.95 (+0.8)	4 Q	11.04 (-0.2)	11	Did not advance	
Tamara Clark	200 metres	22.27 (+0.4)	5 Q	21.95 (+1.4)	3 Q	22.32 (+0.6)	6
Jenna Prandini	200 metres	22.38 (+1.9)	9 Q	22.08 (+2.0)	8	Did not advance	
Abby Steiner	200 metres	22.26 (+0.9)	3 Q	22.15 (-0.1)	9 Q	22.26 (+0.6)	5
Talitha Diggs	400 metres	51.54	14 Q	50.84	10	Did not advance	
Kendall Ellis	400 metres	52.55	30	Did not advance			
Lynna Irby	400 metres	51.78	18 Q	51.00	12	Did not advance	
Athing Mu	800 metres	2:01.30	14 Q	1:42.41	1 Q	1:56.30	1st place, gold medalist(s)
Raevyn Rogers	800 metres	2:01.36	15 Q	1:58.77	5 q	1:58.26	6
Ajeé Wilson	800 metres	2:01.02	11 Q	1:45.24	9 Q	2:00.19	8
Sinclaire Johnson	1500 metres	4:07.68	26 Q	4:04.51	10 Q	4:01.63	6
Cory McGee	1500 metres	4:03.61	6 Q	4:02.74	5 Q	4:03.70	10
Elle St. Pierre	1500 metres	4:04.94	11 Q	4:09.84	22	Did not advance	
Elise Cranny	5000 metres	14:53.20	7 Q	—N/a		14:59.99	9
Emily Infeld	5000 metres	15:00.98	15 q	—N/a		15:29.03	14
Karissa Schweizer	5000 metres	14:53.69	11 Q	—N/a		DNF	
Alicia Monson	10,000 metres	—N/a				30:59.85	13
Natosha Rogers	10,000 metres	—N/a				31:10.57	15
Karissa Schweizer	10,000 metres	—N/a				30:18.05	9
Emma Bates	Marathon	—N/a				2:23:18	7
Keira D'Amato	Marathon	—N/a				2:23:34	8
Sara Hall	Marathon	—N/a				2:22:10	5
Nia Ali	100 metres hurdles	DQ		Did not advance			
Alia Armstrong	100 metres hurdles	12.48 (+0.5)	2 Q	12.43 (-0.1)	6 Q	12.31 (+2.5)	4
Keni Harrison	100 metres hurdles	12.60 (-0.4)	5 Q	12.27 (+0.9)	2 Q	DQ	
Alaysha Johnson	100 metres hurdles	DQ		Did not advance			
Shamier Little	400 metres hurdles	54.77	8 Q	53.61	4 Q	53.76	4
Sydney McLaughlin	400 metres hurdles	53.95	2 Q	52.17	1 Q	50.68 WR	1st place, gold medalist(s)
Dalilah Muhammad	400 metres hurdles	54.45	3 Q	53.28	3 Q	53.13	3rd place, bronze medalist(s)
Britton Wilson	400 metres hurdles	54.54	5 Q	53.72	7 q	54.02	5
Emma Coburn	3000 metres steeplechase	9:15.19	8 q	—N/a		9:16.49	8
Courtney Frerichs	3000 metres steeplechase	9:17.91	13 q	—N/a		9:10.59	6
Courtney Wayment	3000 metres steeplechase	9:14.95	7 q	—N/a		9:22.37	12
Aleia Hobbs*; Melissa Jefferson; Jenna Prandini; Abby Steiner; Twanisha Terry	4 × 100 metres relay	41.56	1 Q	—N/a		41.14	1st place, gold medalist(s)
Talitha Diggs; Allyson Felix*; Sydney McLaughlin; Abby Steiner; Jaide Stepter Baynes*; Kaylin Whitney*; Britton Wilson	4 × 400 metres relay	3:23.38	1 Q	—N/a		3:17.79	1st place, gold medalist(s)
Miranda Melville	20 kilometres walk	—N/a				1:39:58	35
Robyn Stevens	20 kilometres walk	—N/a				1:36:16	24
Stephanie Casey	35 kilometres walk	—N/a				3:00:54	24
Miranda Melville	35 kilometres walk	—N/a				3:05:31	29
Maria Michta-Coffey	35 kilometres walk	—N/a				2:58:51	22

* – Indicates the athlete competed in preliminaries but not the final

Field events

Athlete	Event	Qualification		Final	
Athlete	Event	Distance	Position	Distance	Position
Vashti Cunningham	High jump	1.86	=18	Did not advance	
Rachel Glenn	High jump	1.81	=25	Did not advance	
Rachel McCoy	High jump	1.90	17	Did not advance	
Gabriela Leon	Pole vault	4.35	=12 q	4.30	12
Sandi Morris	Pole vault	4.50	=1 q	4.85	2nd place, silver medalist(s)
Katie Nageotte	Pole vault	4.50	=1 q	4.85	1st place, gold medalist(s)
Quanesha Burks	Long jump	6.86	1 Q	6.88	4
Tiffany Flynn	Long jump	6.73	7 q	6.48	12
Jasmine Moore	Long jump	6.60	13	Did not advance	
Tori Franklin	Triple jump	14.36	9 q	14.72	3rd place, bronze medalist(s)
Jasmine Moore	Triple jump	14.24	13	Did not advance	
Keturah Orji	Triple jump	14.37	7 q	14.49	6
Adelaide Aquilla	Shot put	18.33	14	Did not advance	
Chase Ealey	Shot put	18.96	10 Q	20.49	1st place, gold medalist(s)
Maggie Ewen	Shot put	18.96	9 Q	18.64	9
Jessica Woodard	Shot put	19.08	7 Q	18.67	8
Valarie Allman	Discus throw	68.36	1 Q	68.30	3rd place, bronze medalist(s)
Rachel Dincoff	Discus throw	57.62	24	Did not advance	
Veronica Fraley	Discus throw	58.32	17	Did not advance	
Laulauga Tausaga-Collins	Discus throw	62.85	9 q	56.47	12
Ariana Ince	Javelin	57.24	18	Did not advance	
Maggie Malone	Javelin	54.19	22	Did not advance	
Kara Winger	Javelin	61.30	4 q	64.05	2nd place, silver medalist(s)
Brooke Andersen	Hammer throw	74.37	2 Q	78.96	1st place, gold medalist(s)
Annette Echikunwoke	Hammer throw	72.60	5 q	68.12	12
Janee' Kassanavoid	Hammer throw	74.46	1 Q	74.86	3rd place, bronze medalist(s)

Combined events – Heptathlon

Athlete	Event	100H	HJ	SP	200 m	LJ	JT	800 m	Final	Rank
Michelle Atherley	Result	13.12 (+0.7)	1.71	12.56	23.97 (+1.4)	6.00	32.33	2:12.16	5959	12
Michelle Atherley	Points	1106	867	698	984	850	521	933	5959	12
Anna Hall	Result	13.20 (+0.7)	1.86	13.67	23.08 (+1.4)	6.39	45.75	2:06.67	6755	3rd place, bronze medalist(s)
Anna Hall	Points	1094	1054	772	1071	972	778	1014	6755	3rd place, bronze medalist(s)
Kendell Williams	Result	13.54 (+0.7)	1.71	12.71	25.27 (+1.4)	5.59	43.80	DNS	DNF	
Kendell Williams	Points	1044	867	708	862	726	740	0	DNF	
Ashtin Zamzow-Mahler	Result	13.47 (+1.4)	1.77	12.99	25.15 (+1.5)	5.69	48.41	2:22.28	5974	11
Ashtin Zamzow-Mahler	Points	1055	941	727	873	756	829	793	5974	11

=== Mixed ===
Athlete	Event	Heat		Final	
Athlete	Event	Result	Rank	Result	Rank
Allyson Felix; Elija Godwin; Wadeline Jonathas*; Vernon Norwood; Kennedy Simon	4 × 400 metres relay	3:11.75	1 Q	3:10.16	3rd place, bronze medalist(s)
