= 2022 USA Outdoor Track and Field Championships =

- Dates: June 23–26, 2022
- Host city: Eugene, Oregon, United States
- Venue: Hayward Field
- Level: Senior
- Type: Outdoor
- Events: 40 (men: 20; women: 20)

The 2022 USA Outdoor Track and Field Championships were held in Eugene, Oregon organized by USA Track and Field. It was serving as the national championships in track and field for the United States.

The results of the event determined qualification for the 2022 World Athletics Championships, also held in Eugene. Provided they had achieved the World standard or are in the World Athletics ranking quota, the top three athletes in each event gained a place on the World team. In the event that a leading athlete did not hold the standard, or an athlete withdrew, the next highest finishing athlete with the standard was selected instead. USA Track and Field announced their World Championship roster based on these guidelines in July 2022. The results determined qualification for the 2022 NACAC Championships and the team was announced on 12 August 2022.

The selection events for the men's and women's marathon were held 2021 Boston Marathon, 2021 Chicago Marathon and 2021 New York marathon, the trials for the men's 35 km race walk were held on January 16, 2022, at San Diego Christian College and the Santee Town Center station in Santee, California and the trials for the 20 km race walk were held on February 6, 2022, at Cuyamaca College. The USATF Multi Event Championships (Heptathlon & Decathlon) occurred May 6–7, 2022 at the University of Arkansas’ John McDonnell Field in Fayetteville, Arkansas and 10,000 meter races were held at University of Oregon' Hayward Field in Eugene on May 27, 2022.

== Men's results ==
=== Men track and road events ===
Event	Gold		Silver		Bronze	
100 meters (Wind: +1.8 m/s)	Fred Kerley	9.77	Marvin Bracy	9.85 PB	Trayvon Bromell	9.88
200 meters (Wind: -0.3 m/s)	Noah Lyles	19.67	Erriyon Knighton	19.69	Fred Kerley	19.83
400 meters	Michael Norman	43.56	Champion Allison	43.70	Randolph Ross	44.17
800 meters	Bryce Hoppel	1:44.60	Jonah Koech	1:44.74	Brandon Miller	1:45.19
1500 meters	Cooper Teare	3:45.86	Jonathan Davis	3:46.01 *	Josh Thompson	3:46.07
5000 meters	Grant Fisher	13:03.86 CR	Woody Kincaid	13:06.70	Abdihamid Nur	13:08.63
10,000 meters	Joe Klecker	28:28.71	Grant Fisher	28:28.81	Sean McGorty	28:29.57
Marathon	Galen Rupp	2:06:35	Elkanah Kibet	2:11:15	Colin Mickow	2:13:31
110 meters hurdles (Wind: +1.2 m/s)	Daniel Roberts	13.03	Trey Cunningham	13.08	Devon Allen	13.08
400 meters hurdles	Rai Benjamin	47.04	Trevor Bassitt	47.47	Khallifah Rosser	47.65
3000 meters steeplechase	Hillary Bor	8.15.76	Evan Jager	8:17.29	Benard Keter	8:19.16
20 km walk	Nick Christie	1:30:32	Samuel Allen	1:30:44	Jordan Crawford	1:31:46
35 km walk	Nick Christie	2:48:48	Dan Nehnevaj	2:59:22	Bricyn Healey	3:05:13

=== Notes ===
* John Gregorek Jr. will represent Team USA in the 1500 meters – Jonathan Davis is not in the top 45 of the World Rankings & did not achieve the 2022 World Athletics Championships standard.

** Kenny Bednarek will represent Team USA in the 200 meters – Noah Lyles will enter the World Championships via wildcard as the reigning World Champion.

=== Men field events ===
Event	Gold		Silver		Bronze	
High jump	Shelby McEwen	2.33 m (7 ft 7 1/2 in)	JuVaughn Harrison	2.30 m (7 ft 6 1/2 in)	Dontavious Hill	2.22 m (7 ft 3 1/4 in) ặ
Pole vault	Chris Nilsen	5.70 m (18 ft 8 1/4 in)	Luke Winder	5.70 m (18 ft 8 1/4 in) ḉ	Andrew Irwin	5.60 m (18 ft 4 1/4 in)
Long jump	Rayvon Grey	8.19 m (26 ft 10 1/4 in) (Wind: +0.6 m/s) ***	Steffin McCarter	8.15 m (26 ft 8 3/4 in) (Wind: -0.4 m/s)	Jeremiah Davis	8.11 m (26 ft 7 1/4 in) (Wind: +2.0 m/s) ***
Triple jump	Donald Scott	17.07 m (56 ft 0 in) (Wind: +0.7 m/s)	Will Claye	16.93 m (55 ft 6 1/2 in) (Wind: +1.4 m/s)	Chris Benard	16.83 m (55 ft 2 1/2 in) (Wind: +1.2 m/s)
Shot put	Ryan Crouser	23.12 m (75 ft 10 in)	Joe Kovacs	22.87 m (75 ft 1/4 in)	Josh Awotunde	21.51 m (70 ft 6 3/4 in)
Discus throw	Andrew Evans	63.31 m (207 ft 8 1/2 in)	Dallin Shurts	62.32 m (204 ft 5 1/2 in) *	Sam Mattis	62.25 m (204 ft 2 3/4 in)
Hammer throw	Daniel Haugh	80.18 m (263 ft 1/2 in)	Rudy Winkler	78.33 m (256 ft 11 3/4 in)	Alex Young	76.60 m (251 ft 3 1/2 in)
Javelin throw	Ethan Dabbs	81.29 m (266 ft 8 1/4 in) ḃ	Curtis Thompson	80.49 m (264 ft 3/4 in)	Marc Anthony Minichello	79.05 m (259 ft 4 in) ḃ
Decathlon	Garrett Scantling	8867 pts	Kyle Garland	8720 pts	Zachery Ziemek	8573 pts

=== Notes ===
* Reggie Jagers III will represent Team USA in the discus – Dallin Shurts is not in the top 32 of the World Rankings & did not achieve the 2022 World Athletics Championships standard.

** Tripp Piperi will represent Team USA in the shot put after the 4th place in the shot put. Ryan Crouser, Joe Kovacs, & Josh Awotunde will represent Team USA in the shot put.

*** Marquis Dendy and Will Wiliiams will represent Team USA in the long jump. Jeremiah Davis & Rayvon Grey are not in the top 32 world rankings and do not have the standard.

ặ Darius Carbin will represent Team USA in the high jump. Dontavious Hill is not in the top 32 world ranking and did not earn the 2022 World Athletics Championships standard.

ḃ Tim Glover will represent Team USA in the javelin. Marc Anthony Minichello is not in the top 32 world ranking and did not earn the 2022 World Athletics Championships standard.

== Women's results ==
Key:

=== Women track and road events ===
Event	Gold		Silver		Bronze	
100 meters (Wind: +2.9 m/s)	Melissa Jefferson	10.69	Aleia Hobbs	10.72	Twanisha Terry	10.74
200 meters (Wind: -0.3 m/s)	Abby Steiner	21.77	Tamara Clark	21.92	Jenna Prandini	22.01
400 meters	Talitha Diggs	50.22	Kendall Ellis	50.35	Lynna Irby	50.67
800 meters	Athing Mu	1:57.16	Ajeé Wilson	1:57.23	Raevyn Rogers	1:57.96
1500 meters	Sinclaire Johnson	4:03.29	Cory McGee	4:04.52	Elle St. Pierre	4:05.14
5000 meters	Elise Cranny	15:49.15	Karissa Schweizer	15:49.32	Emily Infeld	15:49.42
10,000 meters	Karissa Schweizer	30:49.56 CR	Alicia Monson	30:51.09	Natosha Rogers	31:29.80
Marathon	Molly Seidel	2:27:46 *	Emma Bates	2:24:20	Sara Hall	2:27:19
100 meters hurdles (Wind: -1.4 m/s)	Keni Harrison	12.34	Alaysha Johnson	12.35	Alia Armstrong	12.47
400 meters hurdles	Sydney McLaughlin	51.41 WR	Britton Wilson	53.08	Shamier Little	53.92
3000 meters steeplechase	Emma Coburn	9:10.63	Courtney Wayment	9:12.10	Courtney Frerichs	9:16.18
20 km walk	Katie Burnett	1:44:03 ά	Celina Lepe	1:45:48 ά	Anali Cisneros	1:49:20 ά
35 km walk	Miranda Melville	3:00:19	Stephanie Casey	3:01:55	Maria Michta-Coffey	3:07:32

=== Note ===
* – Molly Seidel withdrew on July 1, 2022, due to a sacral stress reaction. Keira D'Amato, the first alternate, will compete in her place.

ά – Robyn Stevens and Miranda Melville will represent Team USA in the 20 km race walk. Katie Burnett, Celina Lepe, Anali Cisneros are not in the top 60 world ranking and did not earn the 2022 World Athletics Championships standard.

=== Women field events ===
Event	Gold		Silver		Bronze	
High jump	Vashti Cunningham	1.93 m (6 ft 3 3/4 in)	Rachel Glenn	1.90 m (6 ft 2 3/4 in)	Rachel McCoy	1.90 m (6 ft 2 3/4 in)
Pole vault	Sandi Morris	4.82 m (15 ft 9 3/4 in)	Alina McDonald	4.65 m (15 ft 3 in) *	Katie Nageotte	4.65 m (15 ft 3 in)
Long jump	Quanesha Burks	7.03 m (23 ft 3/4 in) (Wind: +2.7 m/s)	Jasmine Moore	6.80 m (22 ft 3 1/2 in) (Wind: +2.5 m/s)	Tiffany Flynn	6.69 m (21 ft 11 1/4 in) (Wind: +1.3 m/s)
Triple jump	Keturah Orji	14.79 m (48 ft 6 1/4 in) (Wind: +1.8 m/s) CR	Tori Franklin	14.59 m (47 ft 10 1/4 in) (Wind: +1.2 m/s)	Jasmine Moore	14.15 m (46 ft 5 in) (Wind: +1.0 m/s)
Shot put	Chase Ealey	20.51 m (67 ft 3 1/4 in) CR	Adelaide Aquilla	19.45 m (63 ft 9 1/2 in)	Jessica Woodard	19.40 m (63 ft 7 3/4 in)
Discus throw	Valarie Allman	66.92 m (219 ft 6 1/2 in)	Laulauga Tausaga-Collins	64.49 m (211 ft 6 3/4 in)	Rachel Dincoff	62.14 m (203 ft 10 1/4 in)
Hammer throw	Brooke Andersen	77.96 m (255 ft 9 1/4 in)	Janee Kassanavoid	76.03 m (249 ft 5 1/4 in)	Annette Echikunwoke	73.76 m (241 ft 11 3/4 in)
Javelin throw	Kara Winger	64.26 m (210 ft 9 3/4 in)	Ariana Ince	60.43 m (198 ft 3 in)	Avione Allgood-Whetstone	59.26 m (194 ft 5 in)
Heptathlon	Anna Hall	6458 pts	Ashtin Mahler	6184 pts **	Michelle Atherley	6154 pts **

==== Notes ====
* – Gabriela Leon will represent Team USA in the pole vault. Alina McDonald will not represent Team USA because the World Championship Final is on Sunday July 17 and she has not and won't compete on Sundays for religious reasons.

** – Ashtin Mahler & Michelle Atherley did not earn the World Athletics standard, so Erica Bougard & Kendell Williams will represent Team USA July 17–18 at 2022 World Athletics Championships. Michelle Atherley won 2022 NACAC Combined Events Championships May 14-15th in Ottawa and qualified by designated competition to represent Team USA at 2022 World Athletics Championships in Eugene, Oregon.

== Schedule ==
Event schedule
Track Events
DAY ONE—THURSDAY, JUNE 23, 2022
Time (PST)	Event	Division	Round
4:00 p.m.	800m	Men	First round
4:25 p.m.	800m	Women	First round
4:50 p.m.	400m hurdles	Women	First round
5:15 p.m.	100m	Women	First round
5:40 p.m.	100m	Men	First round
6:05 p.m.	3000m steeplechase	Men	First round
6:35 p.m.	1500m	Men	First round
6:53 p.m.	1500m	Women	First round
7:11 p.m.	400m	Women	First round
7:36 p.m.	400m	Men	First round
DAY TWO—FRIDAY, JUNE 24, 2022
TIME	EVENT	GENDER	ROUND
5:10 p.m.	100m hurdles	Women	First round
5:35 p.m.	100m	Women	Semi-final
5:50 p.m.	100m	Men	Semi-final
6:05 p.m.	3000m steeplechase	Women	First round
6:35 p.m.	400m hurdles	Men	First round
7:04 p.m.	400m hurdles	Women	Semi-final
7:21 p.m.	100m	Women	Final
7:30 p.m.	100m	Men	Final
7:46 p.m.	800m	Men	Semi-final
8:02 p.m.	800m	Women	Semi-final
8:25 p.m.	400m	Women	Semi-final
8:46 p.m.	400m	Men	Semi-final
DAY THREE—SATURDAY, JUNE 25, 2022
TIME	EVENT	GENDER	ROUND
11:45 a.m.	200m	Men	First round
12:10 p.m.	200m	Women	First round
12:35 p.m.	110m hurdles	Men	First round
1:04 p.m.	100m hurdles	Women	Semi-final
1:22 p.m.	400m hurdles	Men	Semi-final
1:40 p.m.	1500m	Women	Final
1:52 p.m.	1500m	Men	Final
2:04 p.m.	3000m steeplechase	Men	Final
2:21 p.m.	400m	Women	Final
2:31 p.m.	400m	Men	Final
2:41 p.m.	100m hurdles	Women	Final
2:51 p.m.	400m hurdles	Women	Final
DAY FOUR—SUNDAY, JUNE 26, 2022
TIME	EVENT	GENDER	ROUND
10:30 a.m.	5000m	Women	Final
10:53 a.m.	5000m	Men	Final
11:15 a.m.	3000m steeplechase	Women	Final
11:30 a.m.	200m	Men	Semi-final
11:45 a.m.	200m	Women	Semi-final
12:00 p.m.	110m hurdles	Men	Semi-final
1:04 p.m.	800m	Men	Final
1:14 p.m.	400m hurdles	Men	Final
1:24 p.m.	800m	Women	Final
1:34 p.m.	200m	Men	Final
1:44 p.m.	200m	Women	Final
1:54 p.m.	110m hurdles	Men	Final

Event schedule
Field Events
DAY ONE—THURSDAY, JUNE 23, 2022
Time (PST)	Event	Division	Round
5:00 p.m.	Hammer Throw	Women	Final
5:15 p.m.	Long Jump	Women	Final
5:45 p.m.	Discus Throw	Men	Final
DAY TWO—FRIDAY, JUNE 24, 2022
TIME	EVENT	GENDER	ROUND
5:45 p.m.	Long Jump	Men	Final
5:55 p.m.	Pole Vault	Women	Final
6:15 p.m.	High Jump	Women	Final
6:42 p.m.	Shot Put	Men	Final
6:45 p.m.	Discus Throw	Women	Final
DAY THREE—SATURDAY, JUNE 25, 2022
TIME	EVENT	GENDER	ROUND
11:30 a.m.	Javelin Throw	Women	Final
12:00 p.m.	Pole Vault	Men	Final
12:15 p.m.	Hammer Throw	Men	Final
12:30 p.m.	Triple Jump	Women	Final
DAY FOUR—SUNDAY, JUNE 26, 2022
TIME	EVENT	GENDER	ROUND
12:15 p.m.	Triple Jump	Men	Final
12:25 p.m.	High Jump	Men	Final
12:35 p.m.	Javelin Throw	Men	Final
1:00 p.m.	Shot Put	Women	Final

Event schedule
U20 Women Heptathlon
DAY ONE-THURSDAY, June 23, 2022
TIME	EVENT	GENDER	ROUND
10:00 a.m.	100m hurdles	U20 Women	Heptathlon
11:00 a.m.	High Jump	U20 Women	Heptathlon
1:00 p.m.	Shot Put	U20 Women	Heptathlon
2:00 p.m.	200m	U20 Women	Heptathlon
DAY TWO-FRIDAY June 24, 2022
TIME	EVENT	GENDER	ROUND
10:45 a.m.	Long Jump	U20 Women	Heptathlon
12:00 p.m.	Javelin Throw	U20 Women	Heptathlon
1:31 p.m.	800m	U20 Women	Heptathlon

Event schedule
U20 Men Decathlon
DAY ONE-THURSDAY, June 23, 2022
TIME	EVENT	GENDER	ROUND
10:20 a.m.	100m	U20 Men	Decathlon
11:10 a.m.	Long Jump	U20 Men	Decathlon
12:10 p.m.	Shot Put	U20 Men	Decathlon
1:20 p.m.	High Jump	U20 Men	Decathlon
3:30 p.m.	400m	U20 Men	Decathlon
DAY TWO-FRIDAY June 24, 2022
TIME	EVENT	GENDER	ROUND
9:45 a.m.	110m hurdles	U20 Men	Decathlon
10:30 a.m.	Discus Throw	U20 Men	Decathlon
12:00 p.m.	Pole Vault	U20 Men	Decathlon
2:30 p.m.	Javelin Throw	U20 Men	Decathlon
4:24 p.m.	1500m	U20 Men	Decathlon

Event schedule
U20 Track Events
DAY ONE-THURSDAY, June 23, 2022
TIME	EVENT	GENDER	ROUND
8:05 p.m.	5000m	U20 Women	Final
8:27 p.m.	5000m	U20 Men	Final
DAY TWO-FRIDAY June 24, 2022
TIME	EVENT	GENDER	ROUND
7:30 a.m.	10 km Race Walk	U20 Women	Final
8:40 a.m.	10 km Race Walk	U20 Men	Final
12:15 p.m.	100m	U20 Women	First round
12:34 p.m.	100m	U20 Men	First round
12:53 p.m.	1500m	U20 Women	First round
1:12 p.m.	1500m	U20 Men	First round
1:50 p.m.	100m hurdles	U20 Women	First round
2:09 p.m.	110m hurdles	U20 Men	First round
2:28 p.m.	400m	U20 Women	First round
2:47 p.m.	400m	U20 Men	First round
3:07 p.m.	400m hurdles	U20 Women	First round
3:27 p.m.	400m hurdles	U20 Men	First round
3:46 p.m.	800m	U20 Men	First round
4:05 p.m.	800m	U20 Women	First round
4:35 p.m.	100m	U20 Women	Final
4:43 p.m.	100m	U20 Men	Final
4:50 p.m.	110m hurdles	U20 Men	Final
4:57 p.m.	100m hurdles	U20 Women	Final
DAY THREE-SATURDAY June 25, 2022
TIME	EVENT	GENDER	ROUND
3:05 p.m.	200m	U20 Men	First round
3:24 p.m.	200m	U20 Women	First round
3:44 p.m.	3000m steeplechase	U20 Women	Final
4:01 p.m.	800m	U20 Women	Final
4:09 p.m.	800m	U20 Men	Final
4:17 p.m.	400m	U20 Women	Final
4:25 p.m.	400m	U20 Men	Final
4:34 p.m.	400m hurdles	U20 Women	Final
4:43 p.m.	400m hurdles	U20 Men	Final
4:52 p.m.	1500m	U20 Women	Final
5:03 p.m.	1500m	U20 Men	Final
5:13 p.m.	3000m steeplechase	U20 Men	Final
5:29 p.m.	200m	U20 Women	Final
5:37 p.m.	200m	U20 Men	Final
5:45 p.m.	3000m	U20 Women	Final
6:01 p.m.	3000m	U20 Men	Final

Event schedule
U20 Field Events
DAY ONE-THURSDAY, June 23, 2022
11:30 a.m.	Hammer Throw	U20 Women	Final
2:15 p.m.	Javelin Throw	U20 Women	Final
2:30 p.m.	Hammer Throw	U20 Men	Final
DAY TWO-FRIDAY June 24, 2022
TIME	EVENT	GENDER	ROUND
12:45 p.m.	High Jump	U20 Men	Final
1:00 p.m.	Shot Put	U20 Men	Final
1:15 p.m.	Long Jump	U20 Men	Final
2:30 p.m.	Pole Vault	U20 Men	Final
3:30 p.m.	Long Jump	U20 Women	Final
4:20 p.m.	Discus Throw	U20 Women	Final
DAY THREE-SATURDAY June 25, 2022
TIME	EVENT	GENDER	ROUND
2:30 p.m.	Javelin Throw	U20 Men	Final
3:25 p.m.	Triple Jump	U20 Men	Final
3:30 p.m.	Pole Vault	U20 Women	Final
4:15 p.m.	High Jump	U20 Women	Final
4:45 p.m.	Shot Put	U20 Women	Final
4:55 p.m.	Triple Jump	U20 Women	Final
5:00 p.m.	Discus Throw	U20 Men	Final

== Qualification ==
USA Track & Field sets minimum performances standards for entry into the national championships. In order to merit entry into the championships, an athlete must meet that standard, or better, within a set time frame prior to the competition.

All qualifying performances for the U.S. Olympic Trials must be attained on a standard outdoor track in the period

- Tuesday, June 1, 2021, through Sunday, June 12, 2022,

or on an indoor track, in the same event, in the period

- Wednesday, December 1, 2020, through Sunday, June 12, 2022;

or on a 20 km Race Walks whose qualifying period is from

- Wednesday, December 1, 2020, through Sunday, January 24, 2022;

except for the Decathlon & Heptathlon whose qualifying period is from

- Wednesday, December 1, 2020, through Sunday, April 24, 2022;

except for the 10,000 meters whose qualifying period is from

- Wednesday, December 1, 2020, through Sunday, May 15, 2022;

The qualifying performance for the men's 35 km Race Walk must be attained in the period

- Monday, January 1, 2019, through Sunday, January 12, 2022.

There are also automatic qualifying criteria outside of the entry standards. Athletes who are the reigning indoor or outdoor national champion are automatically qualified to enter that event.

Qualifying marks must be attained in a 2020 U.S. Olympic Trials event. No qualifying marks will be allowed using alternate events, except for the men's Mile run as follows: An appeal to use a Mile qualifying mark for the 1500 will be accepted only if the mile mark was made during the 2021 season, from January 1, 2021, through June 19, 2022, and the mark is 3:54.00 or better.

For events over distances from 100 m to 800 m, performances will only be accepted if fully automatic timing (FAT) is used. For performances beyond that distance, FAT times are also used, but in the event that the athlete has not recorded a FAT performance, a manually recorded time may be used. There will be no adjustment for marks made at altitude. Wind-assisted performances will not be accepted for 2022 USA Outdoor Track and Field Championships qualifying.

Event	Men's standard	Women's standard	Max entrants	Rounds
100 m	10.05	11.15	32	3
200 m	20.24	22.80	32	3
400 m	45.20	51.35	32	3
800 m	1:46.25	2:00.50	32	3
1500 m	3:37.00	4:05.70	36	2
5000 m	13:20.00	15:13.00	24	1
10,000 m	27:50.00	31:45.00	24	1
20,000 m race walk	1:36:00	1:48:00	15	1
35,000 m race walk	5:15:00	–	15	1
110/100 m hurdles	13.50	12.88	32	3
400 m hurdles	49.50	56.75	32	3
3000 m steeplechase	8:29.00	9:40.00	26	2
High jump	2.27 m (7 ft 5 1/4 in)	1.87 m (6 ft 1 1/2 in)	18	1
Pole vault	5.80 m (19 ft 1/4 in)	4.55 m (14 ft 11 in)	18	1
Long jump	8.12 m (26 ft 7 1/2 in)	6.60 m (21 ft 7 3/4 in)	18	1
Triple jump	16.30 m (53 ft 5 1/2 in)	13.50 m (44 ft 3 1/4 in)	18	1
Shot put	20.80 m (68 ft 2 3/4 in)	18.00 m (59 ft 1/2 in)	18	1
Discus throw	62.00 m (203 ft 4 3/4 in)	58.25 m (191 ft 1 1/4 in)	18	1
Hammer throw	72.50 m (237 ft 10 1/4 in)	67.00 m (219 ft 9 3/4 in)	18	1
Javelin throw	76.00 m (249 ft 4 in)	54.00 m (177 ft 1 3/4 in)	18	1
Decathlon/Heptathlon	7900 pts	6000 pts	16	1

== Notes ==
The following are eligible for automatic selection by Team USA to 2022 World Athletics Championships.

2019 World Athletics Championships Champions

- Christian Coleman, 100 m
- Noah Lyles, 200 m
- Donavan Brazier, 800 m
- Grant Holloway, 110 hurdles
- Sam Kendricks, Pole Vault
- Christian Taylor, Triple jump
- Joe Kovacs, Shot Put
- Nia Ali, 100 m hurdles
- Dalilah Muhammad, 400 m hurdles
- DeAnna Price, Hammer throw

2021 Diamond League Champions

- Fred Kerley, 100 m
- Kenny Bednarek, 200 m
- Michael Cherry, 400 m
- Devon Allen, 110 m hurdles
- Ryan Crouser, Shot Put
- Quanera Hayes, 400 m
- Magdalyn Ewen, Shot Put
- Valarie Allman, Discus

2021 World Athletics Combined Events Challenge Winner

- Kendell Williams, Heptathlon
