= 2022 World Athletics Championships – Women's heptathlon =

Women's heptathlon at the 2022 World Championships
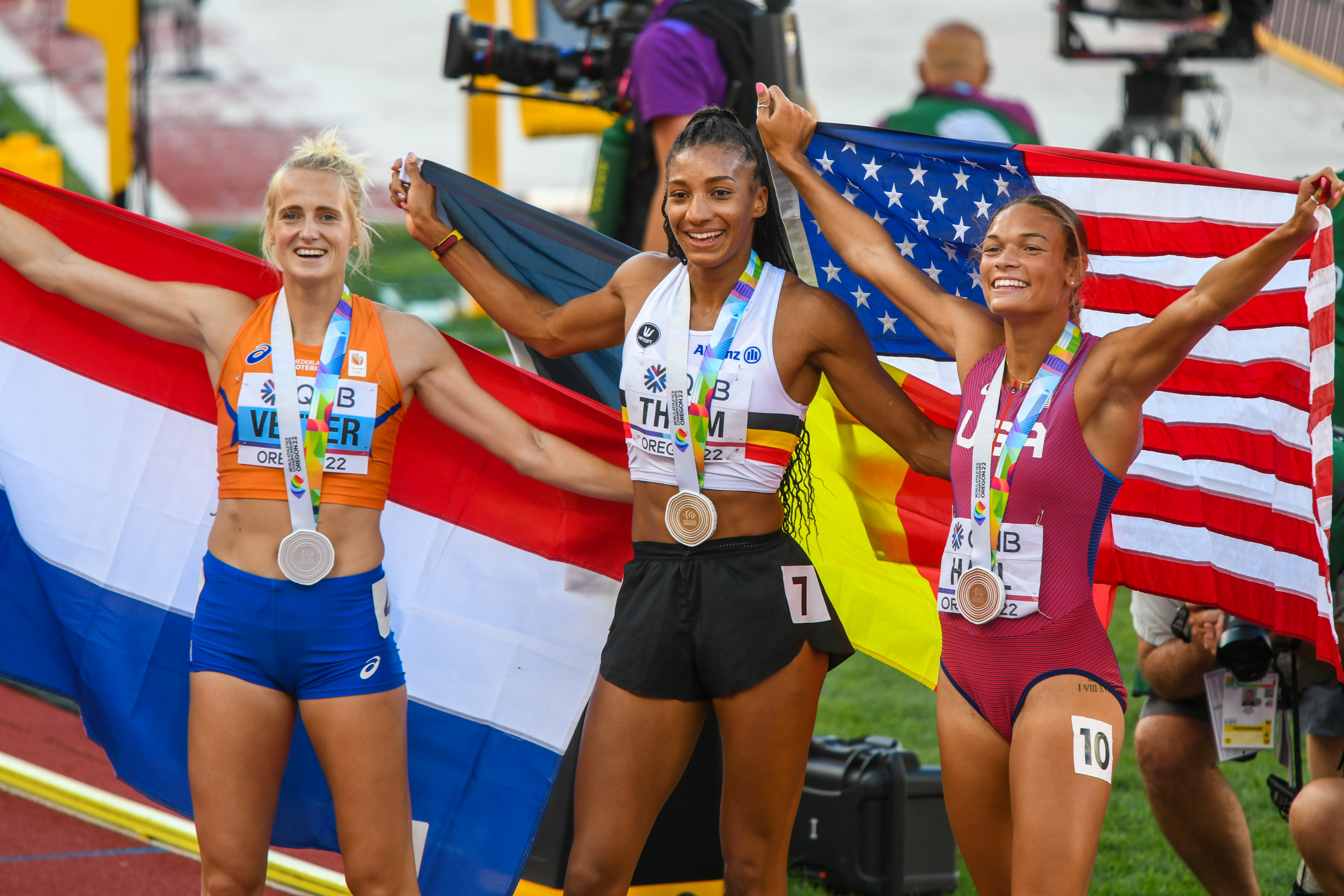
- The medalists shortly after the final discipline.
- Venue: Hayward Field
- Dates: 17 July (100 metres hurdles, high jump, shot put, 200 metres); 18 July (long jump, javelin throw, 800 metres)
- Competitors: 15 from 10 nations
- Winning score: 6947

Medalists
| gold medal | Nafissatou Thiam | Belgium |
| silver medal | Anouk Vetter | Netherlands |
| bronze medal | Anna Hall | United States |

The women's heptathlon at the 2022 World Athletics Championships was held at the Hayward Field in Eugene on 17 and 18 July 2022. The winning margin was 80 points.

== Records ==
Before the competition records were as follows:

| Record | Athlete & Nat. | Perf. | Location | Date |
|---|---|---|---|---|
| World record | Jackie Joyner-Kersee (USA) | 7291 pts | Seoul, South Korea | 24 September 1988 |
| Championship record | Jackie Joyner-Kersee (USA) | 7128 pts | Rome, Italy | 1 September 1987 |
| World Leading | Anouk Vetter (NED) | 6693 pts | Götzis, Austria | 29 May 2022 |
| African Record | Margaret Simpson (GHA) | 6423 pts | Götzis, Austria | 29 May 2005 |
| Asian Record | Ghada Shouaa (SYR) | 6942 pts | Götzis, Austria | 26 May 1996 |
| North, Central American and Caribbean record | Jackie Joyner-Kersee (USA) | 7291 pts | Seoul, South Korea | 24 September 1988 |
| South American Record | Evelis Aguilar (COL) | 6346 pts | Ibagué, Colombia | 14 March 2021 |
| European Record | Carolina Klüft (SWE) | 7032 pts | Osaka, Japan | 26 August 2007 |
| Oceanian record | Jane Flemming (AUS) | 6695 pts | Auckland, New Zealand | 28 January 1990 |

For the current records in each discipline see Women's heptathlon.

The following records were set at the competition:

| Record | Discipline | Perf. | Athlete | Nat. | Date |
|---|---|---|---|---|---|
| World Leading | | 6947 pts | Nafissatou Thiam | BEL | 18 Jul 2022 |
| Championship heptathlon best | High jump | 1.95m | Nafissatou Thiam | BEL | 17 Jul 2022 |

== Qualification standard ==
The standard to qualify automatically for entry was 6420 points.

== Schedule ==
The event schedule, in local time (UTC−7), was as follows:

| Date | Time | Round |
|---|---|---|
| 17 July | 10:35 | 100 metres hurdles |
| 17 July | 11:35 | High jump |
| 17 July | 13:45 | Shot put |
| 17 July | 18:38 | 200 metres |
| 18 July | 10:55 | Long jump |
| 18 July | 12:05 | Javelin throw |
| 18 July | 18:55 | 800 metres |

== Results ==
=== 100 metres hurdles ===
The 100 metres hurdles event was started on 17 July at 10:35.

Wind:
Heat 1: +1.4 m/s, Heat 2: +0.7 m/s

| Rank | Heat | Name | Nationality | Time | Points | Notes |
|---|---|---|---|---|---|---|
| 1 | 2 | Michelle Atherley | United States | 13.12 | 1106 | |
| 2 | 2 | Annik Kälin | Switzerland | 13.17 | 1099 | PB |
| 3 | 2 | Anna Hall | United States | 13.20 | 1094 | |
| 4 | 2 | Noor Vidts | Belgium | 13.20 | 1094 | SB |
| 5 | 1 | Nafissatou Thiam | Belgium | 13.21 | 1093 | PB |
| 6 | 2 | Adrianna Sułek | Poland | 13.28 | 1083 | |
| 7 | 2 | Anouk Vetter | Netherlands | 13.30 | 1080 | |
| 8 | 1 | Emma Oosterwegel | Netherlands | 13.44 | 1059 | SB |
| 9 | 2 | Xénia Krizsán | Hungary | 13.46 | 1056 | |
| 10 | 1 | Ashtin Zamzow-Mahler | United States | 13.47 | 1055 | SB |
| 11 | 1 | Sophie Weissenberg | Germany | 13.51 | 1049 | PB |
| 12 | 2 | Kendell Williams | United States | 13.54 | 1044 | |
| 13 | 1 | Katarina Johnson-Thompson | Great Britain & N.I. | 13.55 | 1043 | SB |
| 14 | 1 | Claudia Conte | Spain | 13.65 | 1028 | PB |
| 15 | 1 | Paulina Ligarska | Poland | 14.19 | 952 | |
| | 1 | Odile Ahouanwanou | Benin | DNS | 0 | |

=== High jump ===
The high jump event was started on 17 July at 13:25.

| Rnk | Grp | Athlete | Nationality | 1.59 | 1.62 | 1.65 | 1.68 | 1.71 | 1.74 | 1.77 | 1.80 | 1.83 | 1.86 | 1.89 | 1.92 | 1.95 | 1.98 | Res | Pts | Nts | Overall | |
| Rnk | Grp | Athlete | Nationality | 1.59 | 1.62 | 1.65 | 1.68 | 1.71 | 1.74 | 1.77 | 1.80 | 1.83 | 1.86 | 1.89 | 1.92 | 1.95 | 1.98 | Res | Pts | Nts | Pts | Rnk |
|---|---|---|---|---|---|---|---|---|---|---|---|---|---|---|---|---|---|---|---|---|---|---|
| 1 | A | Nafissatou Thiam | Belgium | – | – | – | – | – | – | – | o | o | o | o | xxo | o | xxx | 1.95 | 1171 | =CHB | 2264 | 1 |
| 2 | A | Adrianna Sułek | Poland | – | – | – | – | o | o | o | o | o | xo | xxo | xxx | | | 1.89 | 1093 | | 2176 | 2 |
| 3 | A | Anna Hall | United States | – | – | – | – | o | o | o | o | o | xo | xxo | xxx | | | 1.89 | 1093 | SB | 2176 | 3 |
| 4 | A | Claudia Conte | Spain | – | – | – | – | o | o | o | o | o | xo | xxx | | | | 1.86 | 1054 | SB | 2082 | 5 |
| 5 | A | Katarina Johnson-Thompson | Great Britain & N.I. | – | – | – | – | – | o | o | o | o | xxx | | | | | 1.83 | 1016 | SB | 2059 | 6 |
| 6 | A | Noor Vidts | Belgium | – | – | – | o | xo | xo | xo | o | xo | xxx | | | | | 1.83 | 1016 | | 2110 | 4 |
| 7 | B | Anouk Vetter | Netherlands | – | – | o | o | o | o | xxo | xo | xxx | | | | | | 1.80 | 978 | SB | 2058 | 7 |
| 8 | A | Ashtin Zamzow-Mahler | United States | – | – | – | o | o | o | xo | xxx | | | | | | | 1.77 | 941 | | 1996 | 10 |
| 9 | A | Paulina Ligarska | Poland | – | – | – | o | xo | o | xo | xxx | | | | | | | 1.77 | 941 | | 1893 | 15 |
| 10 | B | Emma Oosterwegel | Netherlands | – | – | xxo | o | o | o | xo | xxx | | | | | | | 1.77 | 941 | SB | 2000 | 9 |
| 11 | B | Sophie Weissenberg | Germany | – | – | – | – | o | o | xxx | | | | | | | | 1.74 | 903 | | 1952 | 13 |
| 12 | B | Annik Kälin | Switzerland | – | – | o | o | xo | o | xxx | | | | | | | | 1.74 | 903 | | 2002 | 8 |
| 13 | B | Xénia Krizsán | Hungary | – | o | o | o | o | xo | xxx | | | | | | | | 1.74 | 903 | | 1959 | 12 |
| 14 | B | Michelle Atherley | United States | – | o | o | o | xo | xxx | | | | | | | | | 1.71 | 867 | | 1973 | 11 |
| 15 | B | Kendell Williams | United States | – | xo | o | xxo | xxo | xxx | | | | | | | | | 1.71 | 867 | | 1911 | 14 |

=== Shot put ===
The shot put event took place on 17 July.

| Rank | Group | Name | Nationality | Round | | | Result | Points | Notes | Overall | |
| Rank | Group | Name | Nationality | 1 | 2 | 3 | Result | Points | Notes | Pts | Rank |
|---|---|---|---|---|---|---|---|---|---|---|---|
| 1 | B | Anouk Vetter | Netherlands | 14.73 | 16.25 | 15.42 | 16.25 | 945 | PB | 3003 | 2 |
| 2 | B | Nafissatou Thiam | Belgium | 14.33 | 14.92 | 15.03 | 15.03 | 863 | SB | 3127 | 1 |
| 3 | B | Noor Vidts | Belgium | 13.96 | 14.05 | 14.43 | 14.43 | 823 | PB | 2933 | 4 |
| 4 | B | Emma Oosterwegel | Netherlands | 13.66 | 13.45 | 14.40 | 14.40 | 821 | | 2821 | 6 |
| 5 | A | Adrianna Sułek | Poland | 14.06 | 14.11 | 14.13 | 14.13 | 803 | PB | 2979 | 3 |
| 6 | B | Paulina Ligarska | Poland | 13.96 | 12.68 | 14.08 | 14.08 | 799 | | 2692 | 13 |
| 7 | B | Xénia Krizsán | Hungary | 13.79 | 14.08 | 13.95 | 14.08 | 799 | SB | 2758 | 10 |
| 8 | B | Annik Kälin | Switzerland | 13.71 | 13.43 | 12.61 | 13.71 | 775 | | 2777 | 8 |
| 9 | A | Anna Hall | United States | 13.67 | 13.40 | 13.56 | 13.67 | 772 | PB | 2920 | 5 |
| 10 | A | Sophie Weissenberg | Germany | 13.57 | x | x | 13.57 | 765 | | 2717 | 12 |
| 11 | A | Ashtin Zamzow-Mahler | United States | x | 12.52 | 12.99 | 12.99 | 727 | | 2723 | 11 |
| 12 | A | Katarina Johnson-Thompson | Great Britain & N.I. | 12.65 | 12.74 | 12.92 | 12.92 | 722 | | 2781 | 7 |
| 13 | A | Kendell Williams | United States | x | 12.50 | 12.71 | 12.71 | 708 | | 2619 | 15 |
| 14 | A | Michelle Atherley | United States | 11.57 | 11.64 | 12.56 | 12.56 | 698 | | 2671 | 14 |
| 15 | A | Claudia Conte | Spain | 11.78 | 12.07 | 12.46 | 12.46 | 692 | | 2774 | 9 |

=== 200 metres ===
The 200 metres event was started on 17 July at 18:38.

Wind:
Heat 1: +1.5 m/s, Heat 2: +1.4 m/s

| Rank | Heat | Athlete | Nationality | Result | Points | Notes | Overall | |
| Rank | Heat | Athlete | Nationality | Result | Points | Notes | Pts | Rank |
|---|---|---|---|---|---|---|---|---|
| 1 | 2 | Anna Hall | United States | 23.08 | 1071 | PB | 3991 | 3 |
| 2 | 2 | Katarina Johnson-Thompson | Great Britain & N.I. | 23.62 | 1017 | | 3798 | 6 |
| 3 | 2 | Anouk Vetter | Netherlands | 23.73 | 1007 | SB | 4010 | 2 |
| 4 | 2 | Adrianna Sułek | Poland | 23.77 | 1003 | PB | 3982 | 4 |
| 5 | 2 | Noor Vidts | Belgium | 23.92 | 988 | SB | 3921 | 5 |
| 6 | 2 | Michelle Atherley | United States | 23.97 | 984 | | 3655 | 12 |
| 7 | 1 | Annik Kälin | Switzerland | 24.05 | 976 | | 3753 | 8 |
| 8 | 2 | Sophie Weissenberg | Germany | 24.06 | 975 | | 3692 | 9 |
| 9 | 1 | Nafissatou Thiam | Belgium | 24.39 | 944 | | 4071 | 1 |
| 10 | 1 | Emma Oosterwegel | Netherlands | 24.43 | 940 | SB | 3761 | 7 |
| 11 | 1 | Paulina Ligarska | Poland | 24.65 | 919 | PB | 3611 | 13 |
| 12 | 1 | Claudia Conte | Spain | 24.77 | 908 | PB | 3682 | 10 |
| 13 | 1 | Xénia Krizsán | Hungary | 24.82 | 903 | | 3661 | 11 |
| 14 | 1 | Ashtin Zamzow-Mahler | United States | 25.15 | 873 | | 3596 | 14 |
| 15 | 2 | Kendell Williams | United States | 25.27 | 862 | | 3481 | 15 |

=== Long jump ===
The long jump event was started on 18 July at 09:35.

| Rank | Group | Name | Nationality | Round | | | Result | Points | Notes | Overall | |
| Rank | Group | Name | Nationality | 1 | 2 | 3 | Result | Points | Notes | Pts | Rank |
|---|---|---|---|---|---|---|---|---|---|---|---|
| 1 | A | Nafissatou Thiam | Belgium | 6.49 | x | 6.59 | 6.59 | 1036 | | 5107 | 1 |
| 2 | A | Annik Kälin | Switzerland | 6.56 | x | x | 6.56 | 1027 | | 4780 | 6 |
| 3 | A | Anouk Vetter | Netherlands | x | 6.17 | 6.52 | 6.52 | 1014 | PB | 5024 | 2 |
| 4 | A | Adrianna Sułek | Poland | 6.07 | x | 6.43 | 6.43 | 985 | PB | 4967 | 3 |
| 5 | A | Anna Hall | United States | 6.02 | 6.31 | 6.39 | 6.39 | 972 | | 4963 | 4 |
| 6 | A | Noor Vidts | Belgium | 6.07 | 6.33 | x | 6.33 | 953 | | 4874 | 5 |
| 7 | B | Katarina Johnson-Thompson | Great Britain & N.I. | 6.28 | x | x | 6.28 | 937 | | 4735 | 7 |
| 8 | B | Claudia Conte | Spain | 6.00 | x | 5.91 | 6.00 | 850 | | 4532 | 9 |
| 9 | B | Michelle Atherley | United States | 5.68 | 6.00 | 5.82 | 6.00 | 850 | | 4505 | 10 |
| 10 | B | Emma Oosterwegel | Netherlands | 5.95 | x | 5.87 | 5.95 | 834 | | 4595 | 8 |
| 11 | B | Paulina Ligarska | Poland | 5.88 | x | x | 5.88 | 813 | | 4424 | 11 |
| 12 | B | Ashtin Zamzow-Mahler | United States | x | 5.69 | x | 5.69 | 756 | | 4352 | 12 |
| 13 | A | Kendell Williams | United States | x | 5.59 | x | 5.59 | 726 | | 4207 | 13 |
| | A | Sophie Weissenberg | Germany | x | x | x | NM | 0 | | 3692 | 14 |
| | B | Xénia Krizsán | Hungary | x | x | x | NM | 0 | | 3661 | 15 |

=== Javelin throw ===
The javelin throw event took place on 18 July at 10:50.

| Rank | Group | Name | Nationality | Round | | | Result | Points | Notes | Overall | |
| Rank | Group | Name | Nationality | 1 | 2 | 3 | Result | Points | Notes | Pts | Rank |
|---|---|---|---|---|---|---|---|---|---|---|---|
| 1 | B | Anouk Vetter | Netherlands | 53.89 | 58.29 | 50.56 | 58.29 | 1021 | | 6045 | 1 |
| 2 | B | Emma Oosterwegel | Netherlands | 54.03 | 50.94 | 51.11 | 54.03 | 938 | SB | 5533 | 7 |
| 3 | B | Nafissatou Thiam | Belgium | 51.22 | 50.76 | 53.01 | 53.01 | 919 | SB | 6026 | 2 |
| 4 | B | Ashtin Zamzow-Mahler | United States | x | 48.41 | 47.84 | 48.41 | 829 | | 5181 | 11 |
| 5 | B | Annik Kälin | Switzerland | 48.25 | x | 47.03 | 48.25 | 826 | | 5606 | 5 |
| 6 | B | Paulina Ligarska | Poland | 43.73 | 42.32 | 45.89 | 45.89 | 781 | | 5205 | 10 |
| 7 | A | Anna Hall | United States | 42.85 | 45.75 | x | 45.75 | 778 | PB | 5741 | 3 |
| 8 | B | Claudia Conte | Spain | 41.60 | 44.26 | 44.69 | 44.69 | 757 | | 5289 | 9 |
| 9 | A | Kendell Williams | United States | 42.49 | x | 43.80 | 43.80 | 740 | SB | 4947 | 13 |
| 10 | A | Adrianna Sułek | Poland | 38.16 | 40.55 | 41.63 | 41.63 | 699 | SB | 5666 | 4 |
| 11 | A | Noor Vidts | Belgium | 37.99 | 41.62 | 39.77 | 41.62 | 698 | SB | 5572 | 6 |
| 12 | A | Katarina Johnson-Thompson | Great Britain & N.I. | 38.93 | 39.18 | x | 39.18 | 652 | | 5387 | 8 |
| 13 | A | Michelle Atherley | United States | 27.53 | 26.32 | 32.33 | 32.33 | 521 | | 5026 | 12 |
| | A | Sophie Weissenberg | Germany | | | | DNS | | | DNF | |
| | B | Xénia Krizsán | Hungary | | | | DNS | | | DNF | |

=== 800 metres ===
The 800 metres event took place on 18 July at 19:00.

| Rank | Athlete | Nationality | Result | Points | Notes | Overall | |
| Rank | Athlete | Nationality | Result | Points | Notes | Pts | Rank |
|---|---|---|---|---|---|---|---|
| 1 | Anna Hall | United States | 2:06.67 | 1014 | | 6755 | 3 |
| 2 | Adrianna Sułek | Poland | 2:07.18 | 1006 | PB | 6672 | 4 |
| 3 | Noor Vidts | Belgium | 2:08.50 | 987 | PB | 6559 | 5 |
| 4 | Michelle Atherley | United States | 2:12.16 | 933 | | 5959 | 12 |
| 5 | Nafissatou Thiam | Belgium | 2:13.00 | 921 | PB | 6947 | 1 |
| 6 | Emma Oosterwegel | Netherlands | 2:13.97 | 907 | SB | 6440 | 7 |
| 7 | Claudia Conte | Spain | 2:14.14 | 905 | | 6194 | 9 |
| 8 | Paulina Ligarska | Poland | 2:15.36 | 888 | | 6093 | 10 |
| 9 | Annik Kälin | Switzerland | 2:17.49 | 858 | SB | 6464 | 6 |
| 10 | Katarina Johnson-Thompson | Great Britain & N.I. | 2:19.16 | 835 | SB | 6222 | 8 |
| 11 | Anouk Vetter | Netherlands | 2:20.09 | 822 | SB | 6867 | 2 |
| 12 | Ashtin Zamzow-Mahler | United States | 2:22.28 | 793 | | 5974 | 11 |
| | Kendell Williams | United States | DNS | | | DNF | |

=== Final standings ===
The final standings were as follows:

The highest mark recorded in each event is highlighted in yellow

| Rank | Athlete | Nationality | 100mh | HJ | SP | 200m | LJ | JT | 800m | Total | Notes |
|---|---|---|---|---|---|---|---|---|---|---|---|
| 1st place, gold medalist(s) | Nafissatou Thiam | Belgium | 13.21 | 1.95 | 15.03 | 24.39 | 6.59 | 53.01 | 2:13.00 | 6947 | WL |
| 2nd place, silver medalist(s) | Anouk Vetter | Netherlands | 13.30 | 1.80 | 16.25 | 23.73 | 6.52 | 58.29 | 2:20.09 | 6867 | NR |
| 3rd place, bronze medalist(s) | Anna Hall | United States | 13.20 | 1.86 | 13.67 | 23.08 | 6.39 | 45.75 | 2:06.67 | 6755 | PB |
| 4 | Adrianna Sułek | Poland | 13.28 | 1.89 | 14.13 | 23.77 | 6.43 | 41.63 | 2:07.18 | 6672 | NR |
| 5 | Noor Vidts | Belgium | 13.20 | 1.83 | 14.43 | 23.92 | 6.33 | 41.62 | 2:08.50 | 6559 | SB |
| 6 | Annik Kälin | Switzerland | 13.17 | 1.74 | 13.71 | 24.05 | 6.56 | 48.25 | 2:17.49 | 6464 | NR |
| 7 | Emma Oosterwegel | Netherlands | 13.44 | 1.77 | 14.40 | 24.43 | 5.95 | 54.03 | 2:13.97 | 6440 | SB |
| 8 | Katarina Johnson-Thompson | Great Britain & N.I. | 13.55 | 1.83 | 12.92 | 23.62 | 6.28 | 39.18 | 2:19.16 | 6222 | SB |
| 9 | Claudia Conte | Spain | 13.65 | 1.86 | 12.46 | 24.77 | 6.00 | 44.69 | 2:14.14 | 6194 | PB |
| 10 | Paulina Ligarska | Poland | 14.19 | 1.77 | 14.08 | 24.65 | 5.88 | 45.89 | 2:15.36 | 6093 | |
| 11 | Ashtin Zamzow-Mahler | United States | 13.47 | 1.77 | 12.99 | 25.15 | 5.69 | 48.41 | 2:22.28 | 5974 | |
| 12 | Michelle Atherley | United States | 13.12 | 1.71 | 12.56 | 23.97 | 6.00 | 32.33 | 2:12.16 | 5959 | |
| | Kendell Williams | United States | 13.54 | 1.71 | 12.71 | 25.27 | 5.59 | 43.80 | DNS | DNF | |
| | Sophie Weissenberg | Germany | 13.51 | 1.74 | 13.57 | 24.06 | NM | DNS | | DNF | |
| | Xénia Krizsán | Hungary | 13.46 | 1.74 | 14.08 | 24.82 | NM | DNS | | DNF | |
