= Netherlands at the 2022 World Athletics Championships =

Netherlands at the 2022 World Championships in Athletics
- Flag of the Netherlands
- WA code: NED
- National federation: KNAU
- Website: www.atletiekunie.nl

in Eugene, Oregon July 15 – July 24, 2022
- Competitors: 36 (17 men and 19 women)
- Medals Ranked 30th: Gold 0 Silver 3 Bronze 1 Total 4

World Championships in Athletics appearances
- 1976; 1980; 1983; 1987; 1991; 1993; 1995; 1997; 1999; 2001; 2003; 2005; 2007; 2009; 2011; 2013; 2015; 2017; 2019; 2022; 2023; 2025

The Netherlands competed at the 2022 World Athletics Championships in Eugene, Oregon, from 15–24 July 2022.

== Medalists ==
Medal	Athlete	Event	Date
Silver	Liemarvin Bonevacia; Lieke Klaver; Tony van Diepen; Femke Bol; Eveline Saalberg*	Mixed 4 x 400 m relay	15 July
Silver	Anouk Vetter	Women's heptathlon	18 July
Silver	Femke Bol	Women's 400 m hurdles	22 July
Bronze	Jessica Schilder	Women's shot put	16 July

== Results ==
=== Men ===
Track and road events

Athlete	Event	Heat		Semifinal		Final	
Athlete	Event	Result	Rank	Result	Rank	Result	Rank
Liemarvin Bonevacia	400 m	45.82	16 Q	45.50	15	Did not advance	
Tony van Diepen	800 m	1:46.59	22 Q	1:46.70	20	Did not advance	
Ramsey Angela	400 m hurdles	49.62	14 Q	49.77	17	Did not advance	
Nick Smidt	400 m hurdles	49.80	17 Q	49.56	13	Did not advance	
Hensley Paulina; Taymir Burnet; Joris van Gool; Raphael Bouju	4 x 100 m relay	39.07	13	—N/a		did not advance	
Isayah Boers; Terrance Agard; Nick Smidt; Ramsey Angela	4 x 400 m relay	3:03.14	9	—N/a		did not advance	
Abdi Nageeye	Marathon	—N/a				DNF	

Field events

Athlete	Event	Qualification		Final	
Athlete	Event	Distance	Position	Distance	Position
Denzel Comenentia	Hammer throw	NM		did not advance	
Rutger Koppelaar	Pole vault	5.65	13	did not advance	
Menno Vloon	Pole vault	5.75	9 q	NM	

=== Women ===
Track and road events

Athlete	Event	Heat		Semifinal		Final	
Athlete	Event	Result	Rank	Result	Rank	Result	Rank
Lieke Klaver	400 m	50.24	2 Q	50.18	6 Q	50.33	4
Sifan Hassan	5000 m	14:52.89	2 Q	—N/a		14:48.12	6
Maureen Koster	5000 m	15:18.17	21	—N/a		did not advance	
Sifan Hassan	10,000 m	—N/a				30:10.56	4
Nadine Visser	100 m hurdles	12.76	9 Q	12.66	12	Did not advance	
Zoë Sedney	100 m hurdles	13.38	4	Did not advance			
Femke Bol	400 m hurdles	53.90	1 Q	52.84	2 Q	52.27	2nd place, silver medalist(s)
Andrea Bouma; Zoë Sedney; Minke Bisschops; Naomi Sedney	4 x 100 m relay	43.46	13	—N/a		did not advance	
Hanneke Oosterwegel; Lieke Klaver; Cathelijn Peeters; Femke Bol	4 x 400 m relay	DQ		—N/a		did not advance	

Field events

Athlete	Event	Qualification		Final	
Athlete	Event	Distance	Position	Distance	Position
Jorinde van Klinken	Shot put	18.19	16	Did not advance	
Benthe König	Shot put	17.51	20	Did not advance	
Jessica Schilder	Shot put	19.16	4 Q	19.77	3rd place, bronze medalist(s)
Jorinde van Klinken	Discus throw	65.66	2 Q	64.97	4

Combined events – Heptathlon

Athlete	Event	100H	HJ	SP	200 m	LJ	JT	800 m	Final	Rank
Emma Oosterwegel	Result	13.44	1.77	14.40	24.43	5.95	54.03	2:13.97	6440	7
Emma Oosterwegel	Points	1059	941	821	940	834	938	907	6440	7
Anouk Vetter	Result	13.30	1.80	16.25	23.73	6.52	58.29	2:20.09	6867	2nd place, silver medalist(s)
Anouk Vetter	Points	1080	978	945	1007	1014	1021	822	6867	2nd place, silver medalist(s)

=== Mixed ===
Athlete	Event	Heat		Final	
Athlete	Event	Result	Rank	Result	Rank
Liemarvin Bonevacia; Lieke Klaver; Tony van Diepen; Femke Bol; Eveline Saalberg*	4 × 400 metres relay	3:12.63	2 Q	3:09.90	2nd place, silver medalist(s)
