= Great Britain and Northern Ireland at the 2022 World Athletics Championships =

- Flag of Great Britain
- WA code: GBR

in Eugene, United States 15 July 2022 – 24 July 2022
- Competitors: 80 (38 men and 42 women)
- Medals Ranked 11th: Gold 1 Silver 1 Bronze 5 Total 7

World Athletics Championships appearances (overview)
- 1976; 1980; 1983; 1987; 1991; 1993; 1995; 1997; 1999; 2001; 2003; 2005; 2007; 2009; 2011; 2013; 2015; 2017; 2019; 2022; 2023; 2025

Great Britain and Northern Ireland competed at the 2022 World Athletics Championships in Eugene, United States, from 15 to 24 July 2022. Great Britain and Northern Ireland entered 36 athletes.

== Medallists ==
| Medal | Name | Event | Date |
|---|---|---|---|
| Gold | Jake Wightman | Men's 1500 metres | 19 July |
| Silver | Keely Hodgkinson | Women's 800 metres | 24 July |
| Bronze | Laura Muir | Women's 1500 metres | 18 July |
| Bronze | Dina Asher-Smith | Women's 200 metres | 21 July |
| Bronze | Matthew Hudson-Smith | Men's 400 metres | 22 July |
| Bronze | Jona Efoloko; Zharnel Hughes; Nethaneel Mitchell-Blake; Reece Prescod; Adam Gemili* | Men's 4 × 100 metres relay | 23 July |
| Bronze | Victoria Ohuruogu; Nicole Yeargin; Jessie Knight; Laviai Nielsen; Ama Pipi* | Women's 4 × 400 metres relay | 24 July |

* – Indicates the athlete competed in preliminaries but not the final

== Results ==
Key

- Q = Qualified for the next round
- q = Qualified for the next round as a fastest loser or, in field events, by position without achieving the qualifying target
- NR = National record
- PB = Personal best
- SB = Season best
- N/A = Round not applicable for the event

=== Men ===
Track and road events

| Athlete | Event | Heat | | Semi-final | | Final | |
| Athlete | Event | Result | Rank | Result | Rank | Result | Rank |
|---|---|---|---|---|---|---|---|
| Zharnel Hughes | 100 m | 9.97 =SB | 1 Q | 10.13 | 3 | Did not advance | |
| Reece Prescod | 100 m | 10.15 | 4 | Did not advance | | | |
| Joe Ferguson | 200 m | 20.33 | 4 q | 20.52 | 7 | Did not advance | |
| Adam Gemili | 200 m | 20.60 | 4 | Did not advance | | | |
| Nethaneel Mitchell-Blake | 200 m | 20.11 | 3 Q | 20.30 | 4 | Did not advance | |
| Alex Haydock-Wilson | 400 m | 45.62 SB | 3 Q | 45.08 PB | 4 | Did not advance | |
| Matthew Hudson-Smith | 400 m | 45.49 | 1 Q | 44.38 | 2 Q | 44.66 | 3rd place, bronze medalist(s) |
| Max Burgin | 800 m | DNS | – | Did not advance | | | |
| Kyle Langford | 800 m | 1:45.68 | 2 | 1:45.91 | 4 | Did not advance | |
| Daniel Rowden | 800 m | 1:45.53 =SB | 4 q | 1:46.27 | 3 | Did not advance | |
| Neil Gourley | 1500 m | 3:36.54 | 6 Q | 3:37.22 | 6 | Did not advance | |
| Josh Kerr | 1500 m | 3:38.94 | 1 Q | 3:36.92 | 1 Q | 3:30.60 SB | 5 |
| Jake Wightman | 1500 m | 3:35.31 | 4 Q | 3:34.48 | 3 Q | 3:29.23 WL, PB | 1st place, gold medalist(s) |
| Sam Atkin | 5000 m | 13:34.36 | 10 | —N/a | | Did not advance | |
| Andrew Butchart | 5000 m | 13:31.26 SB | 9 | —N/a | | Did not advance | |
| Marc Scott | 5000 m | 13:22.54 | 8 | —N/a | | Did not advance | |
| Patrick Dever | 10,000 m | —N/a | | | | 29:13.88 | 23 |
| Joshua Griffiths | Marathon | —N/a | | | | 2:17:37 | 49 |
| David King | 110 m hurdles | 13.57 | 4 Q | 13.51 | 7 | Did not advance | |
| Andrew Pozzi | 110 m hurdles | 13.45 | 3 Q | 13.35 | 6 | Did not advance | |
| Joshua Zeller | 110 m hurdles | 13.41 | 3 Q | 13.31 | 2 Q | 13.33 | 5 |
| Alastair Chalmers | 400 m hurdles | 49.37 | 5 | Did not advance | | | |
| Chris McAlister | 400 m hurdles | 51.55 | 6 | Did not advance | | | |
| Jona Efoloko; Zharnel Hughes; Nethaneel Mitchell-Blake; Reece Prescod; Adam Gemili*; Richard Kilty* | 4 × 100 m relay | 38.49 | 2 Q | —N/a | | 37.83 SB | 3rd place, bronze medalist(s) |

* – Indicates the athlete competed in preliminaries but not the final

Field events

| Athlete | Event | Qualification | | Final | |
| Athlete | Event | Distance | Position | Distance | Position |
|---|---|---|---|---|---|
| Joel Clarke-Khan | High jump | 2.21 | =23 | Did not advance | |
| Harry Coppell | Pole vault | 5.50 | =19 | Did not advance | |
| Ben Williams | Triple jump | 15.98 | 26 | Did not advance | |
| Scott Lincoln | Shot put | 19.97 | 16 | Did not advance | |
| Lawrence Okoye | Discus throw | 63.57 | 13 | Did not advance | |
| Nicholas Percy | Discus throw | 63.20 | 14 | Did not advance | |
| Nick Miller | Hammer throw | 77.13 SB | 9 q | 73.74 | 11 |

=== Women ===
Track and road events

| Athlete | Event | Heat | | Semi-final | | Final | |
| Athlete | Event | Result | Rank | Result | Rank | Result | Rank |
|---|---|---|---|---|---|---|---|
| Dina Asher-Smith | 100 m | 10.84 SB | 1 Q | 10.89 | 2 Q | 10.83 =NR | 4 |
| Imani Lansiquot | 100 m | 11.24 | 4 | Did not advance | | | |
| Daryll Neita | 100 m | 10.95 SB | 2 Q | 10.97 | 3 | Did not advance | |
| Dina Asher-Smith | 200 m | 22.56 | 2 Q | 21.96 SB | 2 Q | 22.02 | 3rd place, bronze medalist(s) |
| Beth Dobbin | 200 m | 23.04 | 4 | Did not advance | | | |
| Victoria Ohuruogu | 400 m | 51.07 | 3 Q | 50.99 PB | 5 | Did not advance | |
| Ama Pipi | 400 m | 51.32 | 3 Q | 52.28 | 8 | Did not advance | |
| Nicole Yeargin | 400 m | 51.17 SB | 4 q | 51.22 | 4 | Did not advance | |
| Ellie Baker | 800 m | 2:01.72 | 3 Q | 2:02.77 | 8 | Did not advance | |
| Alexandra Bell | 800 m | 2:01.25 | 4 | Did not advance | | | |
| Keely Hodgkinson | 800 m | 2:00.88 | 1 Q | 1:58.51 | 1 Q | 1:56.38 SB | 2nd place, silver medalist(s) |
| Jemma Reekie | 800 m | 1:59.09 | 2 Q | 2:00.43 | 5 | Did not advance | |
| Melissa Courtney-Bryant | 1500 m | 4:09.07 | 11 | Did not advance | | | |
| Laura Muir | 1500 m | 4:07.53 | 2 Q | 4:01.78 SB | 2 Q | 3:55.28 SB | 3rd place, bronze medalist(s) |
| Katie Snowden | 1500 m | 4:06.92 | 10 | Did not advance | | | |
| Jessica Judd | 5000 m | 14:57.64 | 8 q | —N/a | | 15:19.88 | 13 |
| Amy-Eloise Markovc | 5000 m | 15:31.62 SB | 12 | —N/a | | Did not advance | |
| Eilish McColgan | 5000 m | 14:56.47 SB | 7 q | —N/a | | 15:03.03 | 11 |
| Jessica Judd | 10,000 m | —N/a | | | | 30:35.93 PB | 11 |
| Eilish McColgan | 10,000 m | —N/a | | | | 30:34.60 | 10 |
| Rose Harvey | Marathon | —N/a | | | | DNF | – |
| Jess Piasecki | Marathon | —N/a | | | | 2:28:41 | 12 |
| Charlotte Purdue | Marathon | —N/a | | | | DNF | – |
| Cindy Sember | 100 m hurdles | 12.67 | 2 Q | 12.50 NR | 4 q | 12.38 | 5 |
| Jessie Knight | 400 m hurdles | 55.48 | 4 Q | 55.39 | 7 | Did not advance | |
| Lina Nielsen | 400 m hurdles | 57.42 | 8 | Did not advance | | | |
| Elizabeth Bird | 3000 m steeplechase | 9:23.17 | 5 | —N/a | | Did not advance | |
| Aimee Pratt | 3000 m steeplechase | 9:18.91 NR | 6 q | —N/a | | 9:15.64 NR | 7 |
| Asha Philip; Imani Lansiquot; Dina Asher-Smith; Daryll Neita; Ashleigh Nelson* | 4 × 100 m relay | 41.99 WL | 1 Q | —N/a | | 42.75 | 6 |
| Victoria Ohuruogu; Nicole Yeargin; Jessie Knight; Laviai Nielsen; Ama Pipi* | 4 × 400 m relay | 3:23.92 SB | 2 Q | —N/a | | 3:22.64 SB | 3rd place, bronze medalist(s) |

* – Indicates the athlete competed in preliminaries but not the final

Field events

| Athlete | Event | Qualification | | Final | |
| Athlete | Event | Distance | Position | Distance | Position |
|---|---|---|---|---|---|
| Emily Borthwick | High jump | 1.81 | =25 | Did not advance | |
| Morgan Lake | High jump | DNS | | Did not advance | |
| Laura Zialor | High jump | 1.81 | 27 | Did not advance | |
| Holly Bradshaw | Pole vault | NM | | Did not advance | |
| Molly Caudery | Pole vault | 4.20 | 25 | Did not advance | |
| Jazmin Sawyers | Long jump | 6.68 SB | 9 q | 6.62 | 9 |
| Lorraine Ugen | Long jump | 6.68 | 10 q | 6.53 | 10 |
| Naomi Metzger | Triple jump | 13.97 | 18 | Did not advance | |
| Sophie McKinna | Shot put | 17.21 | 23 | Did not advance | |
| Amelia Strickler | Shot put | 17.40 | 22 | Did not advance | |
| Jade Lally | Discus throw | 58.21 | 18 | Did not advance | |

Combined events – Heptathlon

| Athlete | Event | 100H | HJ | SP | 200 m | LJ | JT | 800 m | Final | Rank |
|---|---|---|---|---|---|---|---|---|---|---|
| Katarina Johnson-Thompson | Result | 13.55 | 1.83 =SB | 12.92 | 23.62 | 6.28 | 39.18 | 2:19.16 | 6222 | 8 |
| Katarina Johnson-Thompson | Points | 1043 | 1016 | 722 | 1017 | 937 | 652 | 835 | 6222 | 8 |

=== Mixed ===
| Athlete | Event | Heat | | Final | |
| Athlete | Event | Result | Rank | Result | Rank |
|---|---|---|---|---|---|
| Joseph Brier; Zoey Clark; Alex Haydock-Wilson; Laviai Nielsen | 4 × 400 metres relay | 3:14.75 SB | 6 | Did not advance | |
