= 2022 World Athletics Championships – Men's shot put =

Men's shot put at the 2022 World Championships
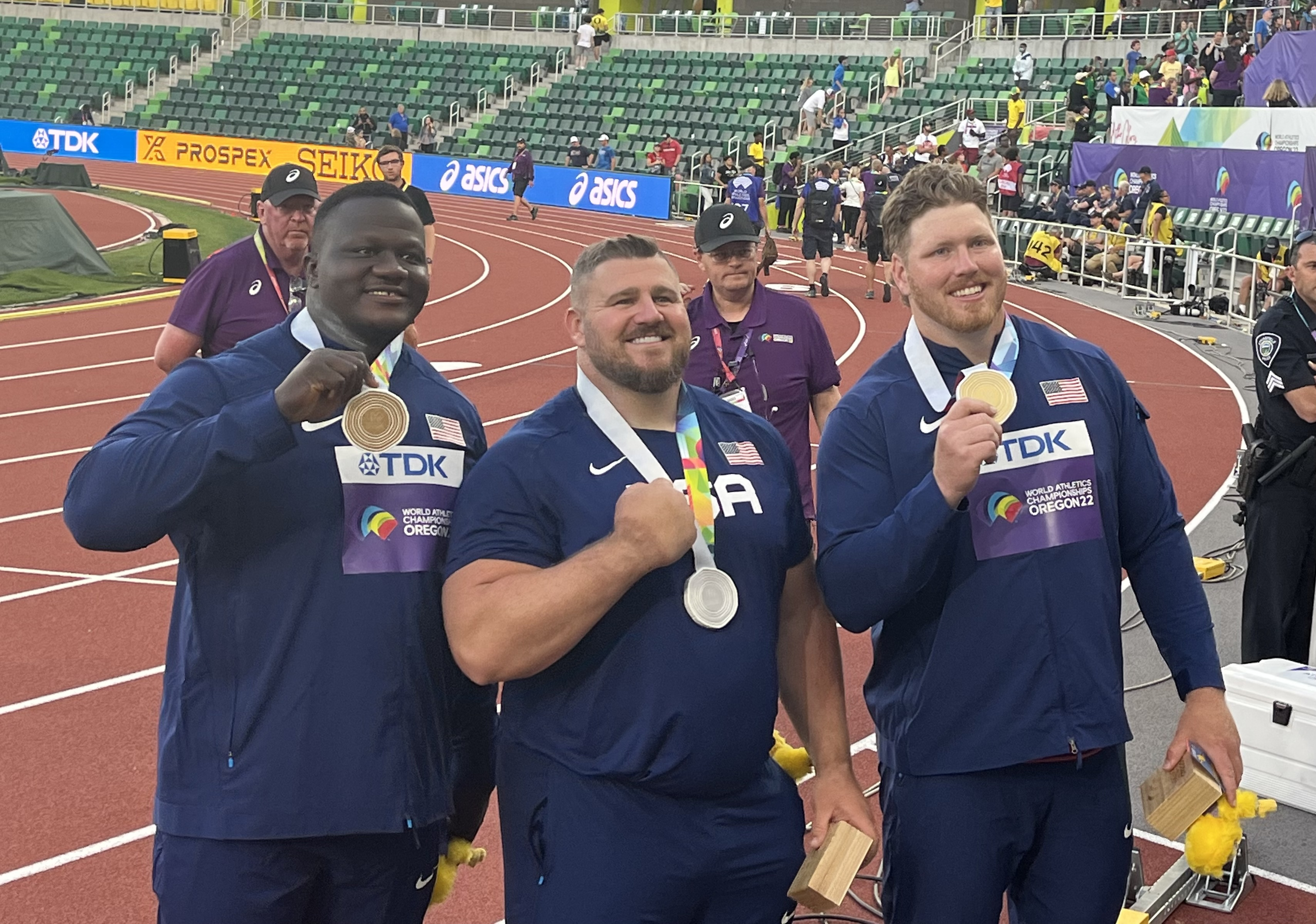
- From left to right: Josh Awotunde, Joe Kovacs, and Ryan Crouser
- Venue: Hayward Field
- Dates: 15 July (qualification); 17 July (final)
- Competitors: 33 from 21 nations
- Winning distance: 22.94

Medalists
gold medal	Ryan Crouser	United States
silver medal	Joe Kovacs	United States
bronze medal	Josh Awotunde	United States

Video on YouTube Official Video

The men's shot put at the 2022 World Athletics Championships was held at the Hayward Field in Eugene on 15 and 17 July 2022.

== Summary ==
All the medalists returned from the previous World Championships, where all three were separated by a mere centimeter. In fact, seven of the 12 finalists returned 3 years later.

Fifth in the order, Olympic Champion Ryan Crouser was the first over 22 metres with a 22.21m. Ninth, defending champion Joe Kovacs upped the ante with his 22.63m. Indoor Champion Darlan Romani moved into third place with 21.69m, which held up until the next thrower, Josh Awotunde pushed Crouser into third place with a 22.24m. Crouser answered in the second round with a 22.71m. That held up until the fifth round. First returning Bronze medalist Tom Walsh threw 22.08 to become the fourth competitor over 22. Awotunde responded with a personal best 22.29m. Then Kovacs unleashed a 22.89, just 2 cm shy of his winning throw three years earlier to take the lead. Seconds later, as the next thrower in the ring, Crouser answered with a Championship Record 22.94 m (75 ft 3 in). None of the leaders could improve in the sixth round leaving an American sweep on home soil.

== Records ==
Before the competition records were as follows:

Record	Athlete & Nat.	Perf.	Location	Date
World record	Ryan Crouser (USA)	23.37 m	Eugene, United States	18 June 2021
Championship record	Joe Kovacs (USA)	22.91 m	Doha, Qatar	5 October 2019
World Leading	Ryan Crouser (USA)	23.12 m	Eugene, United States	24 June 2022
African Record	Janus Robberts (RSA)	21.97 m	Eugene, United States	2 June 2001
Asian Record	Tajinderpal Singh Toor (IND)	21.49 m	Patiala, India	21 June 2021
North, Central American and Caribbean record	Ryan Crouser (USA)	23.37 m	Eugene, United States	18 June 2021
South American Record	Darlan Romani (BRA)	22.61 m	Stanford, United States	30 June 2019
European Record	Ulf Timmermann (GDR)	23.06 m	Chania, Greece	22 May 1988
Oceanian record	Tom Walsh (NZL)	22.90 m	Doha, Qatar	5 October 2019

The following records were established during the competition:

Date	Event	Name	Nationality	Distance	Record
17 July	Final	Ryan Crouser	USA	22.94	CR

== Qualification standard ==
The standard to qualify automatically for entry was 21.10 m.

== Schedule ==
The event schedule, in local time (UTC−7), was as follows:

Date	Time	Round
15 July	18:55	Qualification
17 July	18:27	Final

== Results ==
=== Qualification ===
Qualification: Qualifying Performance 21.20 (Q) or at least 12 best performers (q) advanced to the final.

Rank	Group	Name	Nationality	Round			Mark	Notes
Rank	Group	Name	Nationality	1	2	3	Mark	Notes
1	A	Ryan Crouser	United States	22.28			22.28	Q
2	B	Joe Kovacs	United States	21.50			21.50	Q
3	A	Tom Walsh	New Zealand	20.81	21.11	21.44	21.44	Q
4	B	Nick Ponzio	Italy	21.00	21.35		21.35	Q
5	B	Jacko Gill	New Zealand	20.16	21.24		21.24	Q
6	A	Josh Awotunde	United States	21.18	x	21.13	21.18	q
7	B	Filip Mihaljević	Croatia	20.56	21.17	x	21.17	q
8	B	Adrian Piperi	United States	21.03	x	x	21.03	q
9	B	Darlan Romani	Brazil	x	20.98	x	20.98	q
10	A	Chukwuebuka Enekwechi	Nigeria	20.51	20.87	20.85	20.87	q
11	A	Marcus Thomsen	Norway	19.90	20.27	19.83	20.27	q
12	B	Uziel Muñoz	Mexico	20.06	20.24	20.16	20.24	q
13	A	Konrad Bukowiecki	Poland	19.43	x	20.24	20.24	
14	B	Michał Haratyk	Poland	19.89	20.08	20.13	20.13	
15	A	Roman Kokoshko	Ukraine	19.35	20.02	19.74	20.02	
16	A	Scott Lincoln	Great Britain & N.I.	19.41	x	19.97	19.97	
17	B	Tsanko Arnaudov	Portugal	18.06	19.68	19.93	19.93	
18	A	Andrei Toader	Romania	19.83	19.78	19.60	19.83	
19	A	Welington Morais	Brazil	18.98	19.80	x	19.80	
20	A	Eric Favors	Ireland	19.44	19.50	19.76	19.76	
21	B	Willian Dourado	Brazil	19.65	19.41	19.73	19.73	
22	A	Leonardo Fabbri	Italy	19.49	x	19.73	19.73	
23	B	Simon Bayer	Germany	19.13	19.16	19.71	19.71	
24	B	Carlos Tobalina	Spain	19.45	19.47	19.70	19.70	
25	A	Nicholas Scarvelis	Greece	19.55	19.01	x	19.55	
26	B	Anastasios Latifllari	Greece	18.90	x	18.98	18.98	
27	A	Ignacio Carballo	Argentina	18.74	18.06	x	18.74	
28	B	Dotun Ogundeji	Nigeria	18.35	x	x	18.35	
29	B	John Kelly	Ireland	x	x	17.92	17.92	
	A	Tajinderpal Singh Toor	India	r			NM	

=== Final ===
The final was started on 17 July at 18:27.

Rank	Name	Nationality	Round						Mark	Notes
Rank	Name	Nationality	1	2	3	4	5	6	Mark	Notes
1st place, gold medalist(s)	Ryan Crouser	United States	22.21	22.71	22.58	22.16	22.94	x	22.94	CR
2nd place, silver medalist(s)	Joe Kovacs	United States	22.62	x	22.17	22.16	22.89	22.42	22.89	SB
3rd place, bronze medalist(s)	Josh Awotunde	United States	22.24	21.70	21.14	x	22.29	22.22	22.29	PB
4	Tom Walsh	New Zealand	21.40	20.67	21.49	x	22.08	21.27	22.08	
5	Darlan Romani	Brazil	21.69	21.90	x	21.92	21.34	x	21.92	
6	Filip Mihaljević	Croatia	21.05	x	x	21.35	21.82	21.58	21.82	
7	Jacko Gill	New Zealand	19.19	20.75	20.82	21.03	x	21.40	21.40	
8	Adrian Piperi	United States	20.88	20.93	x	20.79	x	x	20.93	
9	Nick Ponzio	Italy	20.28	20.81	20.76				20.81	
10	Marcus Thomsen	Norway	20.64	20.66	19.98				20.66	
11	Chukwuebuka Enekwechi	Nigeria	20.15	x	20.65				20.65	
12	Uziel Muñoz	Mexico	20.01	19.71	19.79				20.01	
