= 2022 World Athletics Championships – Men's 4 × 400 metres relay =

Men's 4 × 400 metres relay at the 2022 World Championships
- Venue: Hayward Field
- Dates: 23 July (heats); 24 July (final)
- Competitors: 92 from 16 nations
- Winning time: 2:56.17

Medalists
gold medal	Elija Godwin; Michael Norman; Bryce Deadmon; Champion Allison	United States
silver medal	Akeem Bloomfield; Nathon Allen; Jevaughn Powell; Christopher Taylor	Jamaica
bronze medal	Dylan Borlée; Julien Watrin; Alexander Doom; Kevin Borlée	Belgium

The men's 4 × 400 metres relay at the 2022 World Athletics Championships was held at the Hayward Field in Eugene on 23 and 24 July 2022.

== Records ==
Before the competition, records were as follows:

Record	Athlete & Nat.	Perf.	Location	Date
World record	United States; Andrew Valmon, Quincy Watts, Butch Reynolds, Michael Johnson	2:54.29	Stuttgart, Germany	22 August 1993
Championship record	United States; Andrew Valmon, Quincy Watts, Butch Reynolds, Michael Johnson	2:54.29	Stuttgart, Germany	22 August 1993
World Leading	Adidas; Steven Gardiner, Quincy Hall, Erriyon Knighton, Grant Holloway	2:57.72	Gainesville, United States	16 April 2022
African Record	Botswana; Isaac Makwala, Baboloki Thebe, Zibane Ngozi, Bayapo Ndori	2:57.27	Tokyo, Japan	7 August 2021
Asian Record	India; Muhammed Anas Yahiya, Noah Nirmal Tom, Arokia Rajiv, Amoj Jacob	3:00.25	Tokyo, Japan	6 August 2021
North, Central American and Caribbean record	United States; Andrew Valmon, Quincy Watts, Butch Reynolds, Michael Johnson	2:54.29	Stuttgart, Germany	22 August 1993
South American Record	Brazil; Eronilde de Araújo, Sanderlei Parrela, Anderson Oliveira, Claudinei da Silva	2:58.56	Winnipeg, Canada	30 July 1999
European Record	Great Britain; Jamie Baulch, Iwan Thomas, Mark Richardson, Roger Black	2:56.60	Atlanta, United States	3 August 1996
Oceanian record	Australia; Bruce Frayne, Darren Clark, Gary Minihan, Rick Mitchell	2:59.70	Los Angeles, United States	11 August 1984

== Qualification standard ==
The standard to qualify automatically for entry was to finish in the first 10 at 2021 World Relays, completed by 6 top lists' teams.

== Schedule ==
The event schedule, in local time (UTC-7), was as follows:

Date	Time	Round
23 July	17:40	Heats
24 July	19:35	Final

== Results ==
=== Heats ===
The first three in each heat (Q) and the next two fastest (q) qualified for the final.

Rank	Heat	Lane	Nation	Athletes	Time	Notes
1	1	6	United States	Elija Godwin, Vernon Norwood, Bryce Deadmon, Trevor Bassitt	2:58.56	Q SB
2	1	5	Japan	Fuga Sato, Kaito Kawabata, Julian Walsh, Yuki Joseph Nakajima	3:01.53	Q SB
3	1	3	Jamaica	Akeem Bloomfield, Jevaughn Powell, Karayme Bartley, Anthony Cox	3:01.59	Q SB
4	2	4	Belgium	Julien Watrin, Dylan Borlée, Jonathan Sacoor, Kevin Borlée	3:01.96	Q SB
5	2	5	Czech Republic	Matěj Krsek, Pavel Maslák, Michal Desenský, Patrik Šorm	3:02.42	Q NR
6	2	1	Poland	Maksymilian Klepacki, Karol Zalewski, Mateusz Rzeźniczak, Kajetan Duszyński	3:02.51	Q SB
7	1	2	Trinidad and Tobago	Dwight St. Hillaire, Jereem Richards, Asa Guevara, Kashief King	3:02.75	q SB
8	2	8	France	Thomas Jordier, Loïc Prévot, Simon Boypa, Téo Andant	3:03.13	q SB
9	1	7	Netherlands	Isayah Boers, Terrence Agard, Nick Smidt, Ramsey Angela	3:03.14	SB
10	2	3	Italy	Lorenzo Benati, Vladimir Aceti, Brayan Lopez, Edoardo Scotti	3:03.43	SB
11	2	6	Germany	Marvin Schlegel, Manuel Sanders, Marc Koch, Patrick Schneider	3:04.21	
12	1	8	India	Muhammed Anas Yahiya, Muhammed Ajmal Variyathodi, Naganathan Pandi, Rajesh Ramesh	3:07.29	
13	2	7	Botswana	Isaac Makwala, Zibane Ngozi, Keitumentse Maitseo, Leungo Scotch	3:07.32	qR
	2	2	Dominican Republic		DNS	
	1	4	South Africa		DNS	

=== Final ===
Rank	Lane	Nation	Athletes	Time	Notes
1st place, gold medalist(s)	6	United States	Elija Godwin, Michael Norman, Bryce Deadmon, Champion Allison	2:56.17	WL
2nd place, silver medalist(s)	8	Jamaica	Akeem Bloomfield, Nathon Allen, Jevaughn Powell, Christopher Taylor	2:58.58	SB
3rd place, bronze medalist(s)	5	Belgium	Dylan Borlée, Julien Watrin, Alexander Doom, Kevin Borlée	2:58.72	SB
4	3	Japan	Fuga Sato, Kaito Kawabata, Julian Walsh, Yuki Joseph Nakajima	2:59.51	AR
5	9	Trinidad and Tobago	Dwight St. Hillaire, Jereem Richards, Shakeem McKay, Asa Guevara	3:00.03	SB
6	1	Botswana	Zibane Ngozi, Leungo Scotch, Isaac Makwala, Bayapo Ndori	3:00.14	PB
7	2	France	Thomas Jordier, Loïc Prévot, Simon Boypa, Téo Andant	3:01.35	SB
8	4	Czech Republic	Matěj Krsek, Pavel Maslák, Michal Desenský, Patrik Šorm	3:01.63	NR
9	7	Poland	Maksymilian Klepacki, Karol Zalewski, Mateusz Rzeźniczak, Kajetan Duszyński	3:02.51	SB
