= Hungary at the 2022 World Athletics Championships =

Hungary at the 2022 World Championships in Athletics
- WA code: HUN
- National federation: Magyar Atlétikai Szövetség
- Website: www.masz.hu

in Eugene, Oregon, US 15 July 2022 – 24 July 2022
- Competitors: 2 (1 man and 1 woman)

World Championships in Athletics appearances
- 1976; 1980; 1983; 1987; 1991; 1993; 1995; 1997; 1999; 2001; 2003; 2005; 2007; 2009; 2011; 2013; 2015; 2017; 2019; 2022; 2023; 2025

Hungary competed at the 2022 World Athletics Championships in Eugene, Oregon, from 15 to 24 July. Hungary entered 2 athletes.

== Results ==
=== Men ===
Field events

Athlete	Event	Qualification		Final	
Athlete	Event	Distance	Position	Distance	Position
Bence Halász	Hammer throw	79.13	4 Q	80.15 PB	5

=== Women ===
Combined events – Heptathlon

Athlete	Event	100H	HJ	SP	200 m	LJ	JT	800 m	Final	Rank
Xénia Krizsán	Result	13.46	1.74	14.08 SB	24.82	NM	DNF			
Xénia Krizsán	Points	1056	903	799	903	0	DNF			
