= 2022 World Athletics Championships – Women's 10,000 metres =

Women's 10,000 metres at the 2022 World Championships
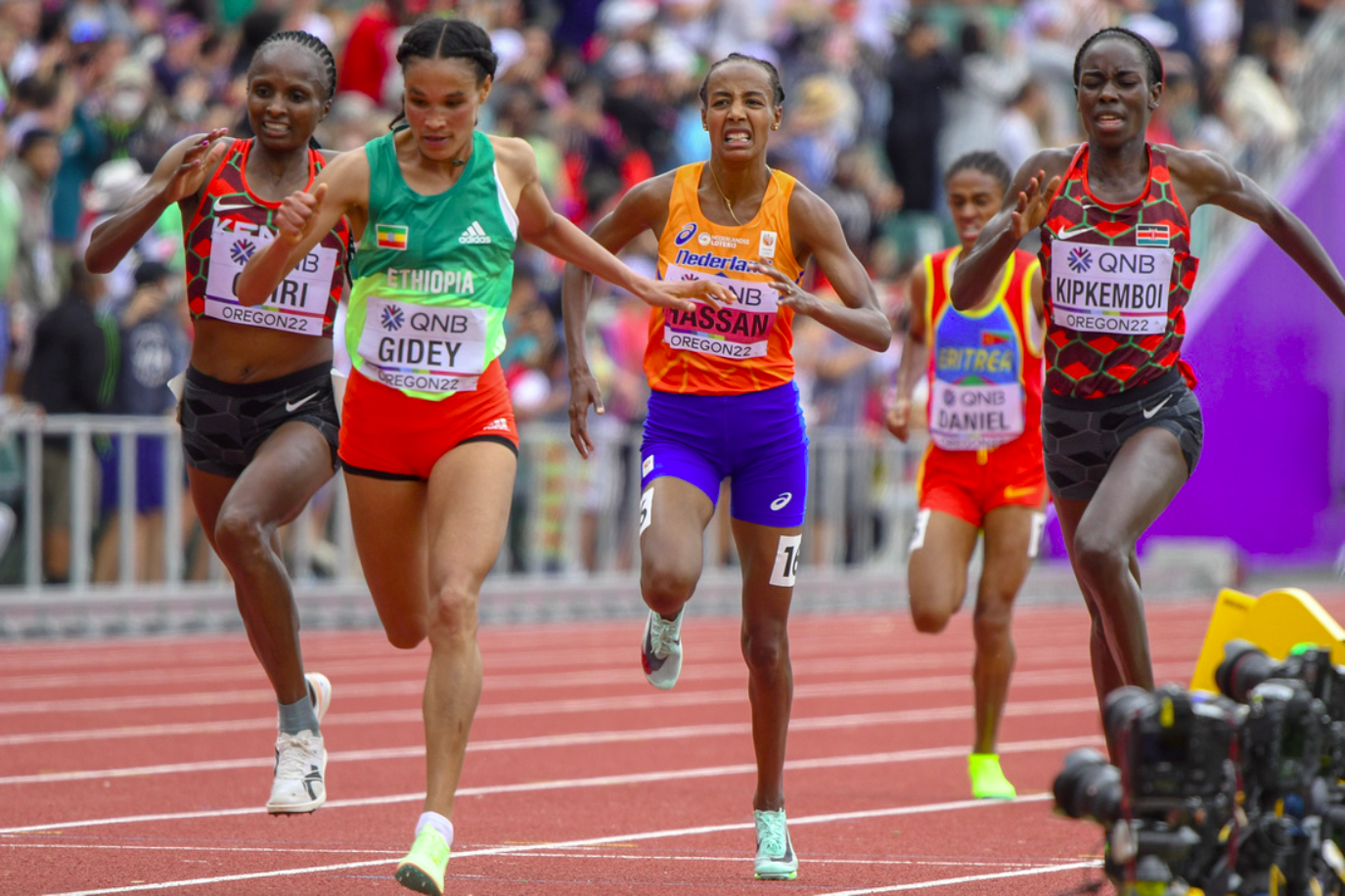
- The finish of the final.
- Venue: Hayward Field
- Dates: 16 July (final)
- Competitors: 25 from 12 nations
- Winning time: 30:09.94

Medalists
gold medal	Letesenbet Gidey	Ethiopia
silver medal	Hellen Obiri	Kenya
bronze medal	Margaret Kipkemboi	Kenya

Video on YouTube Official Video

The women's 10,000 metres at the 2022 World Athletics Championships was held at the Hayward Field in Eugene on 16 July 2022.

== Records ==
Before the competition records were as follows:

Record	Athlete & Nat.	Perf.	Location	Date
World record	Letesenbet Gidey (ETH)	29:01.03	Hengelo, Netherlands	8 June 2021
Championship record	Berhane Adere (ETH)	30:04.18	Saint-Denis, France	23 August 2003
World Leading	Elise Cranny (USA)	30:14.66	San Juan Capistrano, United States	6 March 2022
African Record	Letesenbet Gidey (ETH)	29:01.03	Hengelo, Netherlands	8 June 2021
Asian Record	Wang Junxia (CHN)	29:31.78	Beijing, China	8 September 1993
North, Central American and Caribbean record	Molly Huddle (USA)	30:13.17	Rio de Janeiro, Brazil	12 August 2016
South American Record	Carmen de Oliveira (BRA)	31:47.76	Stuttgart, Germany	21 August 1993
European Record	Sifan Hassan (NED)	29:06.82	Hengelo, Netherlands	6 June 2021
Oceanian record	Kimberley Smith (NZL)	30:35.54	Palo Alto, United States	4 May 2008

The following records were set at the competition:

Record	Perf.	Athlete	Nat.	Date
World Leading	30:09.94	Letesenbet Gidey	ETH	16 Jul 2022

== Qualification standard ==
The standard to qualify automatically for entry was 31:25.00.

== Schedule ==
The event schedule, in local time (UTC−7), was as follows:

Date	Time	Round
16 July	12:20	Final

== Results ==
Rank	Name	Nationality	Time	Notes
1st place, gold medalist(s)	Letesenbet Gidey	Ethiopia	30:09.94	WL
2nd place, silver medalist(s)	Hellen Obiri	Kenya	30:10.02	PB
3rd place, bronze medalist(s)	Margaret Kipkemboi	Kenya	30:10.07	PB
4	Sifan Hassan	Netherlands	30:10.56	SB
5	Rahel Daniel	Eritrea	30:12.15	NR
6	Ejgayehu Taye	Ethiopia	30:12.45	PB
7	Caroline Chepkoech Kipkirui	Kazakhstan	30:17.64	NR
8	Bosena Mulatie	Ethiopia	30:17.77	PB
9	Karissa Schweizer	United States	30:18.05	PB
10	Eilish McColgan	Great Britain & N.I.	30:34.60	
11	Jessica Judd	Great Britain & N.I.	30:35.93	PB
12	Ririka Hironaka	Japan	30:39.71	PB
13	Alicia Monson	United States	30:59.85	
14	Stella Chesang	Uganda	31:01.04	NR
15	Natosha Rogers	United States	31:10.57	PB
16	Mercyline Chelangat	Uganda	31:28.26	SB
17	Dominique Scott	South Africa	31:40.73	
18	Dolshi Tesfu	Eritrea	31:49.29	SB
19	Rino Goshima	Japan	32:08.68	
-	Sheila Chepkirui Kiprotich	Kenya	DNS	
