= Champion Allison =

American sprinter (born 1998)

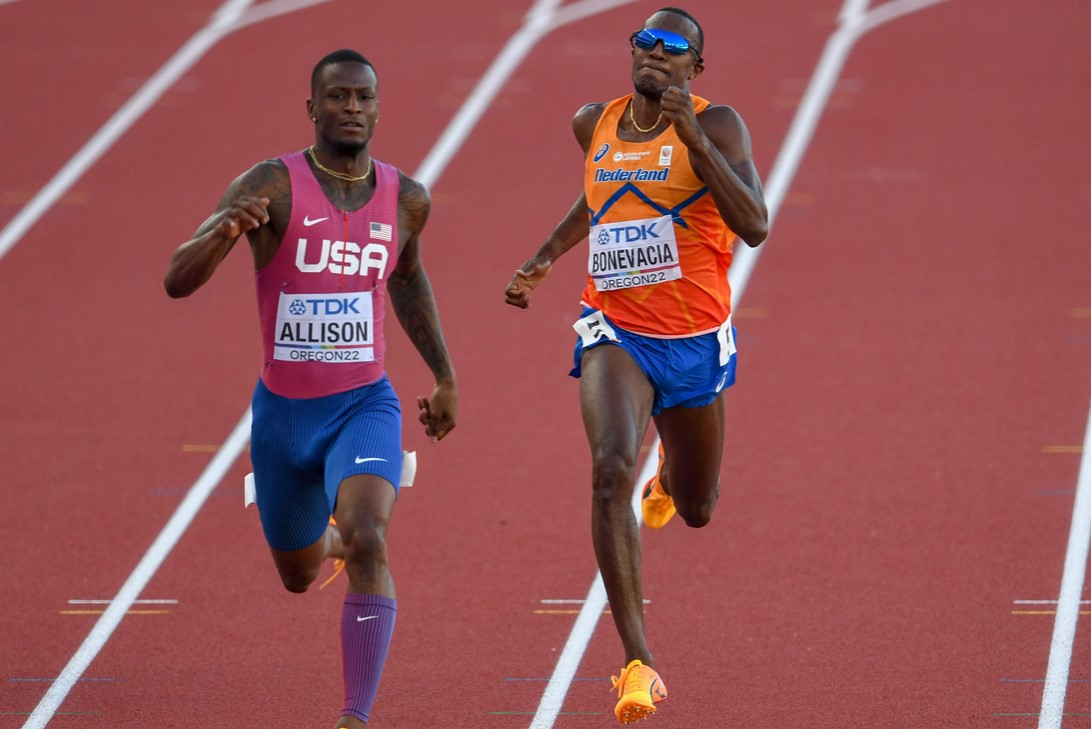
- Allison (left) at the 2022 World Championships

Personal information
- Born: November 5, 1998 (age 27) Houston, Texas, U.S.

Sport
- Country: United States
- Sport: Track and field
- Event: 400 m
- College team: Alabama Crimson Tide; Florida Gators

Achievements and titles
- Personal bests: 200 m: 20.71 (Greensboro 2016); 400 m: 43.70 (Eugene 2022)
Medal record
Men's athletics
Representing the United States
World Championships
Gold medal – first place	2022 Eugene	4 × 400 m relay

Champion Allison (born November 5, 1998) is an American athlete specializing in the 400 metres, who competes collegiately for the Florida Gators.

At the 2022 USA Outdoor Track and Field Championships, Allison placed second in the 400 m in a time of 43.70 seconds, which was the tenth fastest time in world history.

As of 18 September 2024, he holds the track record for 400 metres for Oxford, Miss. where on 14 May 2022 he clocked a time of 44.74 seconds.
