= Jonah Koech =

Kenyan–American middle-distance runner

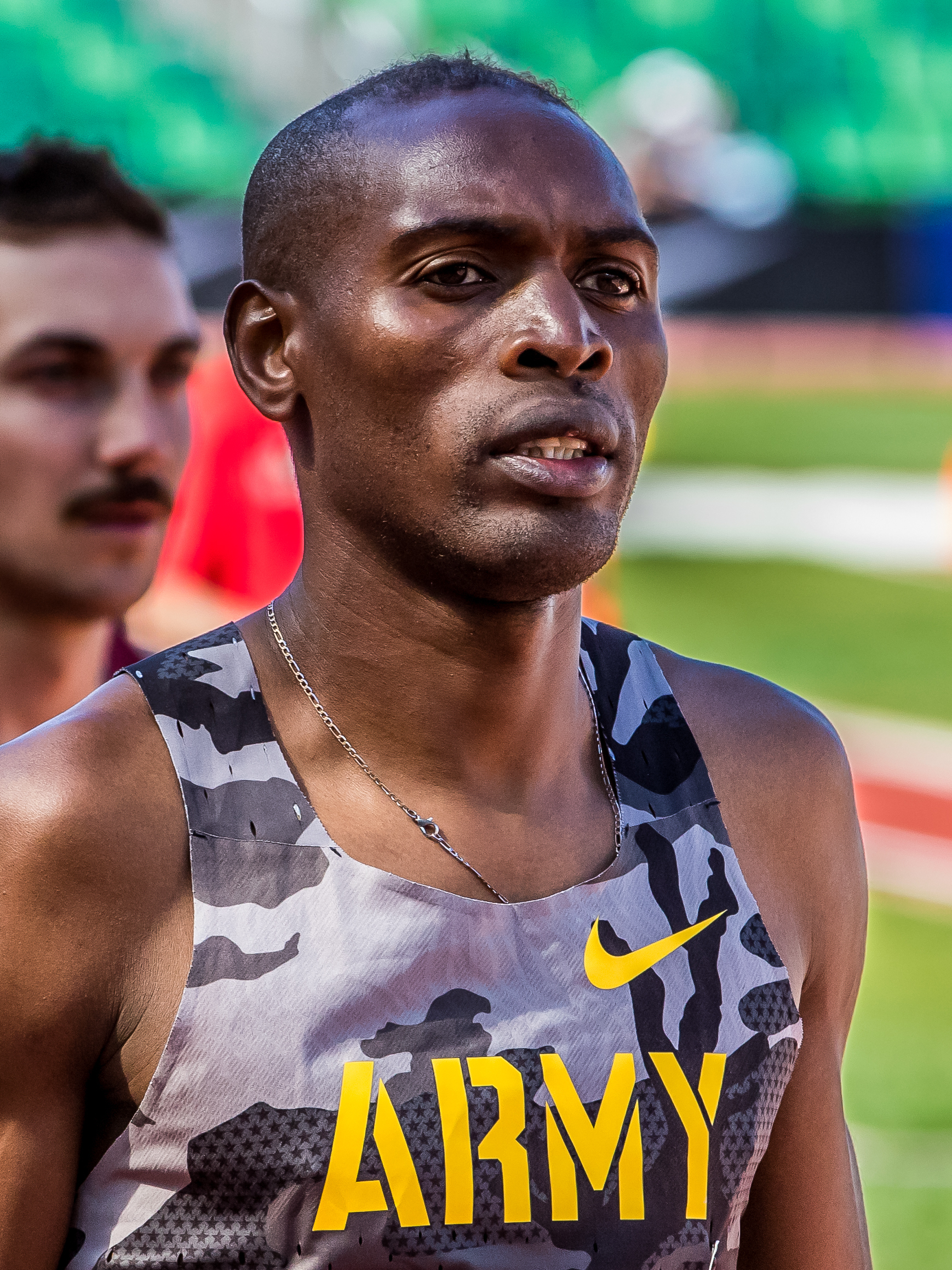
- Koech at the 2022 USA Outdoor Track and Field Championships

Personal information
- Full name: Jonah Koech Kipruto
- Born: December 12, 1996 (age 29) Eldoret, Kenya
- Education: St. Patrick's High School; University of Texas at El Paso '18 BS Physical Therapy; Texas Tech University '19 MS Physical therapy

Sport
- Country: Kenya; United States
- Sport: Track and field
- Event: 800m
- College team: Texas Tech Red Raiders; UTEP Miners
- Club: Under Armour
- Coached by: Tom Brumlik

Achievements and titles
- Personal bests: Outdoor; 400 m: 48.30 (Albuquerque 2018); 600 m: 1:16.49 (Tilburg 2021); 800 m: 1:43.32 (Nairobi 2025); 1000 m: 2:21.26 (Ames, Iowa 2022); 1500 m: 3:31.43 (Rabat 2025); Mile: 4:00.82 (Austin 2016); Indoor; 600 m: 1:17.24 (Albuquerque 2017); 800 m: 1:47.29 (Lubbock 2022); 1000 m: 2:23.75 (Lubbock 2019); 1500 m: 3:44.51 (New York City 2022); Mile: 4:00.24 (New York City 2022)
Medal record
Men's athletics
Representing the United States
NACAC Championships
Gold medal – first place	2022 Freeport	800 m

Jonah Koech Kipruto (born 12 December 1996) is a Kenyan-born middle-distance runner who represents the United States in international competitions. He specializes in the 800 meters and 1500 meters.

In the 800 meters, he qualified for the 2022 World Athletics Championships and 2022 NACAC Championships after finishing second at the 2022 USA Outdoor Track and Field Championships. In the 1500 meters, he won both the 2025 Rabat Diamond League and the 2025 USA Outdoor Track and Field Championships. In 2026, Koech was banned for three years after admitting to blood doping and his performances occurring after June 30, 2025, were disqualified. His ban is in place until July 17, 2029.

He competes for the Under Armour Mission Run team, based in Baltimore, Maryland.

== Early life and collegiate career ==
In the 2010s, Koech attended St. Patrick's High School in Iten, Kenya, where he trained under Colm O'Connell, and alongside 800 meter world record holder David Rudisha.

Koech is a 10-Time USTFCCCA All-American. In 2015, as an 18-year-old freshman at the University of Texas at El Paso, Koech finished 11th at the 2015 NCAA Division I Cross Country Championships. In 2016, Koech finished 6th in the indoor mile and 6th in the outdoor 800m at the NCAA Division I Championships. He later transferred to Texas Tech in 2018, and became a U.S. citizen in 2019 after graduating and enlisting in the U.S. Army.

== Professional career ==
In 2022, Koech ran a personal best of 1:44.74 to finish second in the 800 meter final at the 2022 USA Outdoor Track and Field Championships. At the 2022 World Athletics Championships, he advanced to the semifinals but was disqualified.

On May 25, 2025, Koech won the 1500 meters at the Rabat Diamond League, in a meet record and personal best of 3:31.43. He became the third American man after Leo Manzano and Yared Nuguse to win a Diamond League 1500 meter or mile race. On May 31, 2025, at the Kip Keino Classic in Nairobi, Koech improved his 800-meter personal best to 1:43.32.

On August 2, 2025, Koech won a national title over the 1500 meters at the 2025 USA Outdoor Track and Field Championships, finishing in a personal best time of 3:30.17, thus qualifying for the 2025 World Championships in Tokyo, Japan. Before the race, Koech stated that he was 75-percent healthy and was dealing with a hamstring issue.

On August 10, 2026, the United States Anti-Doping Agency announced that Koech had been suspended for 3 years when his biological passport showed atypical values consistent with blood doping. Koech admitted the violation. All his results after July 30, 2025, were disqualified, and his suspension was dated from July 17, 2026, through July 2029.

== Achievements and titles ==
=== NCAA performances ===
Year	Competition	Venue	Position	Event	Notes
Representing Texas Tech University
2019	NCAA Outdoor T&F Championships	University of Texas at Austin	7th	800m	1:47.28
2019	Big 12 Conference Outdoor T&F Championships	University of Oklahoma	2nd	800m	1:46.42
2019	Big 12 Conference Outdoor T&F Championships	University of Oklahoma	3rd	1500m	3:53.78
2019	NCAA Indoor T&F Championships	Birmingham CrossPlex	13th	800m	1:51.31
2019	Big 12 Conference Indoor T&F Championships	University of Oklahoma	1st	1000m	2:23.75
2019	Big 12 Conference Indoor T&F Championships	University of Oklahoma	3rd	4000m DMR	9:58.59
Representing University of Texas at El Paso
2018	NCAA Outdoor T&F Championships	Eugene, Oregon	7th	800m	1:47.28
2018	Conference USA Outdoor T&F Championships	Rice University	1st	800m	1:48.79
2018	Conference USA Outdoor T&F Championships	Rice University	1st	1500m	3:49.73
2018	NCAA Indoor T&F Championships	College Station, Texas	9th	Mile	4:02.26
2018	Conference USA Indoor T&F Championships	Birmingham CrossPlex	1st	Mile	4:10.03
2018	Conference USA Indoor T&F Championships	Birmingham CrossPlex	2nd	800m	1:52.10
2017	NCAA Outdoor T&F Championships	Eugene, Oregon	24th	4 × 400 m	3:18.65
2017	NCAA Outdoor T&F Championships	Eugene, Oregon	25th	1500m	3:49.66
2017	Conference USA Outdoor T&F Championships	UTEP Miners	5th	800m	1:55.36
2017	Conference USA Outdoor T&F Championships	UTEP Miners	1st	1500m	3:44.64
2017	NCAA Indoor T&F Championships	College Station, Texas	11th	4000m DMR	9:56.03
2017	NCAA Indoor T&F Championships	College Station, Texas	11th	Mile	4:01.02
2017	Conference USA Indoor T&F Championships	Birmingham CrossPlex	3rd	Mile	4:04.93
2017	Conference USA Indoor T&F Championships	Birmingham CrossPlex	1st	4000m DMR	10:03.04
2016	2016 NCAA Division I cross country championships	LaVern Gibson Championship Cross Country Course	122nd	10 km	31:03.2
2016	Conference USA Cross Country Championships	University of North Carolina at Charlotte; Frank Liske Park Concord, North Carolina	2nd	8 km	24:05
2016	NCAA Outdoor T&F Championships	Eugene, Oregon	9th	800m	1:46.53
2016	Conference USA Outdoor T&F Championships	Middle Tennessee State University	2nd	800m	1:50.00
2016	Conference USA Outdoor T&F Championships	Middle Tennessee State University	1st	1500m	3:43.39
2016	NCAA Indoor T&F Championships	Birmingham CrossPlex	6th	Mile	4:07.52
2016	Conference USA Indoor T&F Championships	Birmingham CrossPlex	1st	Mile	4:07.34
2016	Conference USA Indoor T&F Championships	Birmingham CrossPlex	2nd	4000m DMR	10:10.13
2016	Conference USA Indoor T&F Championships	Birmingham CrossPlex	Final	800m	1:51 - DQ
2015	2015 NCAA Division I cross country championships	E. P. "Tom" Sawyer State Park cross country course Louisville, Kentucky	11th	10 km	30:04.4
2015	Conference USA Cross Country Championships	Bowling Green, Kentucky	2nd	8 km	24:44
