= Miranda Melville =

American race walker (born 1989)

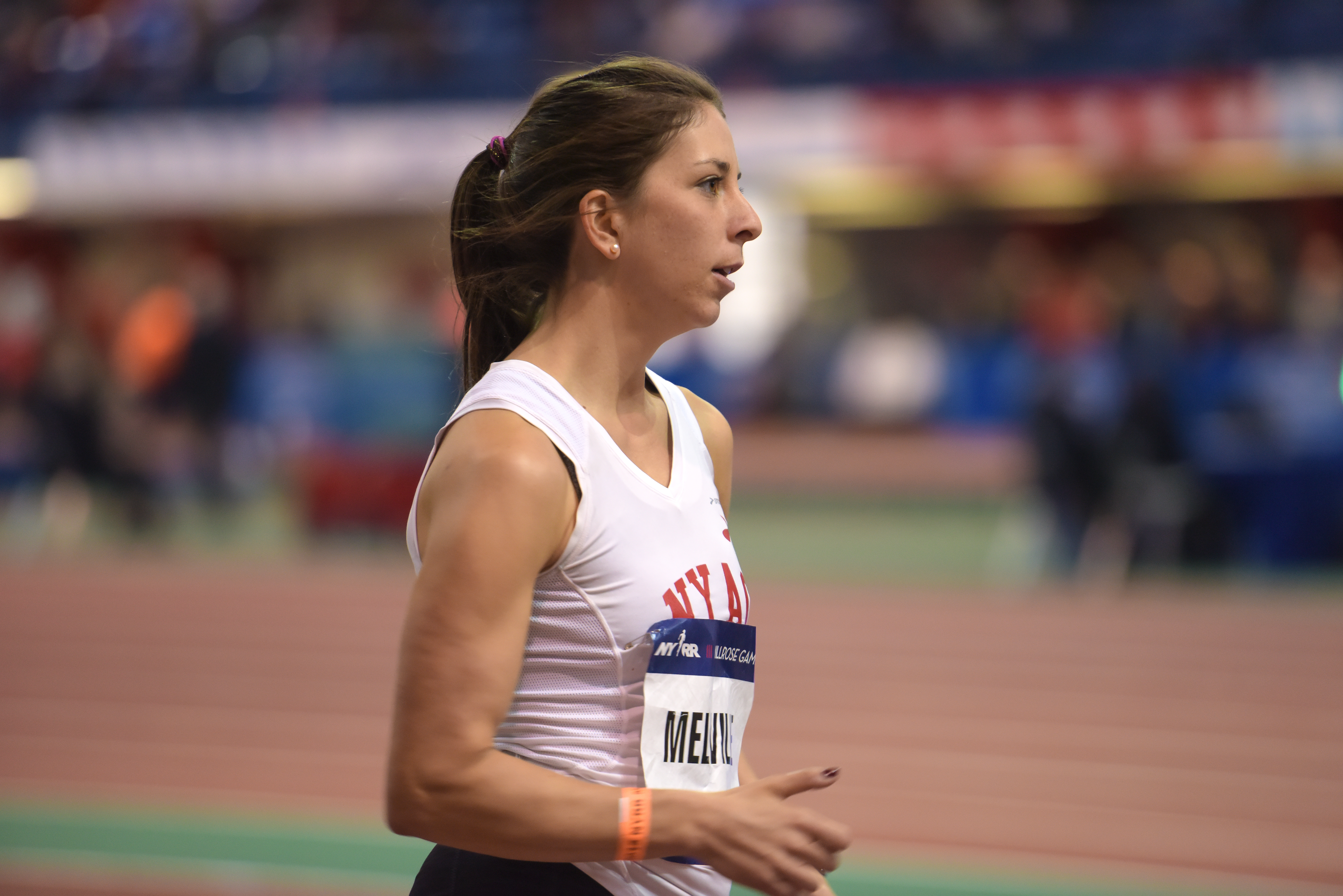

Personal information
- Born: March 20, 1989 (age 37) Rochester, New York, U.S.
- Height: 5 ft 3 in (160 cm)
- Weight: 101 lb (46 kg)

Sport
- Country: United States
- Sport: Athletics (track and field)
- Event: Race walking

Miranda Melville (born March 20, 1989) is an American race walker. She competed in the women's 20 kilometers walk event at the 2015 World Championships in Athletics in Beijing, China. Melville represented the United States in the 2016 Olympic Games in the women's 20k Race Walk where she finished in 34th place.

Melville also hold the American record in the women's indoor 5,000m and 10,000m Race Walks.

Melville started race walking on her high school track and field team at Rush–Henrietta Senior High School in Henrietta, New York. She is now coached by Tim Seaman.

Miranda held her high school record for the 1500 meter race walk and the 2000 meter steeple chase, from her freshman to senior year. She attended college at University of Wisconsin Park side. During college she competed in race walk and cross country. She was an all American. Miranda competed in the 2008 and 2010 Race walking world cup. In 2008 she was the junior National Champion for US vs Canada.

Miranda is related to the author Herman Melville. Her titles include winning 14 national championships, and she has been a member of Team USA 17 times, including during the 2016 Olympics.
