= Michelle Atherley =

American athlete (born 1995)

Personal information
- Nationality: American
- Born: 9 December 1995 (age 30)
- Height: 180 cm (5 ft 11 in)

Sport
- Sport: Athletics
- Event(s): Heptathlon, Pentathlon

Achievements and titles
- Personal best(s): Heptathlon 6465 (Götzis, 2024); Pentathlon 1117 (Birmingham, 2019)

Michelle Atherley is an American heptathlete. She competed at the 2022 World Athletics Championships, the 2025 World Athletics Championships, and was the winner of the World Athletics Combined Events Tour in 2024.

== Early and personal life ==
Michelle is from South Florida and graduated from Port Charlotte High School. She played numerous sports growing up, including gymnastics and soccer. She studied Political Science at the University of Miami, where she went on to receive a double master’s in Public Administration and International Public Administration.

== Career ==
=== NCAA ===
Competing for the University of Auburn, she was the only freshman to qualify for the 2016 NCAA Indoor Track and Field Championships. As a sophomore at the University of Miami, she won the ACC Championships in 2017. Competing for the University of Miami, she won the NCAA Indoor Pentathlon Championships in Birmingham, Alabama in 2019, the only University of Miami athlete to win an NCAA Pentathlon Championship. That year, she was also the ACC Outdoor Heptathlon champion and was named the ACC Indoor Field MVP and the ACC Scholar of the Year.

=== Pro career ===
She finished third at the USATF Combined Events Championships but won the NACAC Combined Events Championships in Ottawa, in May 2022. She competed in the heptathlon at the 2022 World Athletics Championships in Eugene, Oregon.

In August 2023, she scored 6079 pints to win the heptathlon at the Thorpe Cup in Marburg, Germany.

She set a new personal best heptathlon tally of 6372 points to win at the Mt. Sac Relays in April 2024. She placed third on the heptathlon at the Hypo-Meeting in Götzis, Austria in May 2024 with a personal best score of 6465 points. She finished fourth in the US Olympic Trials heptathlon competition in Eugene, Oregon in June 2024. She finished in third place in the heptathlon at the Decastar meeting in Talence, France in September 2024. That month, she was confirmed as the winner of the 2024 World Athletics Combined Events Tour.

She finished fourth in the heptathlon at the Hypo-Meeting in Götzis in 2025. She finished third at Décastar in July 2025 with 6283 points. In September 2025, she competed at the 2025 World Athletics Championships in Tokyo, Japan, placing eleventh overall. She placed fourth in the season-long World Athletics Combined Events Tour for 2025.
