= Elkanah Kibet =

American long-distance runner

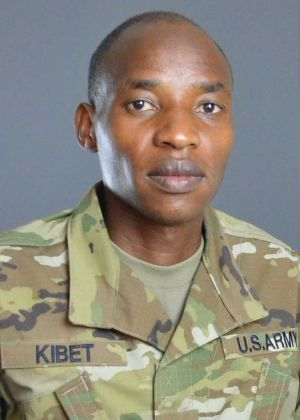
- 2Lt Elkanah Kibet

Personal information
- Born: June 2, 1983 (age 43)
- Education: Auburn University

Sport
- Sport: Athletics
- Event(s): 10,000 meters, marathon
- Club: U.S. Army

Achievements and titles
- Personal best(s): 10,000 m – 28:22.31 (2017); Marathon – 2:07:02 (2022)

Elkanah Kibet (born June 2, 1983) is a Kenyan-born American long distance runner. An alumnus of Auburn University, he is also a financial management technician in the United States Army and competes in marathons as a member of the U.S. Army World Class Athlete Program.

Kibet competed for the Auburn Tigers track and field team in the NCAA.

Kibet won the 2015 and 2016 Reedy River Run 10k race. At the 2017 World Championships, Kibet finished 16th in the marathon. He came in fourth at the 2021 New York City Marathon in 2:11:15, a personal best. Kibet was set to compete at the 2022 New York City Marathon, but withdrew after receiving orders to report overseas. Kibet came in 11th place overall in the 2023 New York City Marathon. Kibet ran 2:10:43 in the 2023 Prague Marathon. Kibet set a personal record by running 2:09:07 in the 2022 Boston Marathon.
