= Ashtin Zamzow-Mahler =

American track and field athlete (born 1996)

Ashtin Zamzow
Personal information
- Nationality: United States
- Born: August 13, 1996 (age 29) Goliad, Texas, U.S.
- Education: University of Texas
- Height: 5 ft 7 in (170 cm)

Sport
- Sport: Track and field
- Event: heptathlon
- College team: Texas Longhorns (formerly) Texas A&M Aggies
- Turned pro: 2019

Achievements and titles
- Personal best(s): Heptathlon: 6222 (Austin 2019) 100 m hurdles: 13.33 +0.9 (Austin 2019); 200 m: 24.23 +1.1 (Austin 2019); 800 Metres: 2:17.27 (Des Moines 2019); 300 Metres Hurdles: 44.41 (Austin 2014); High Jump: 1.78 m (5 ft 10 in) (Austin 2019); Long Jump: 5.83 m (19 ft 1 1/2 in) +3.7 (Austin 2019); Shot Put: 13.42 m (44 ft 1/4 in) (Austin 2019) Javelin Throw: 53.01 m (173 ft 11 in) (Austin 2019)
Medal record
Women's athletics
Representing the United States
Pan American Junior Championships
Gold medal – first place	2015 Edmonton	heptathlon

Ashtin Zamzow (born August 13, 1996) is an American track and field athlete, known for multiple events. She was the 2015 Pan American Junior Champion in the heptathlon. She competed for the University of Texas.

== Professional ==
Championship	Place	Score	100 meters hurdles	High jump	Shot Put	200 meters	Long Jump	Javelin	800 metres
2013 USATF Junior Olympic Track & Field Championships	8th	4396 points	680 points 16.28 s -0.6	736 points 1.60 m (5 ft 2 3/4 in)	577 points 10.72 m (35 ft 2 in)	774 points 26.27 s -1.4	601 points 5.15 m (16 ft 10 3/4 in)	398 points 25.86 m (84 ft 10 in)	630 points 2:35.11
2015 USATF Junior Championships	2nd	5200 points	890 points 14.64 s +0.6	783 points 1.64 m (5 ft 4 1/2 in)	594 points 10.98 m (36 ft 1/4 in)	820 points 25.74 s +2.3	601 points 5.15 m (16 ft 10 3/4 in) +1.2	793 points 46.52 m (152 ft 7 1/4 in)	719 points 2:27.96
2015 Pan American Junior Athletics Championships	1st	5462 points	934 points 14.32 s -0.9	842 points 1.69 m (5 ft 6 1/2 in)	630 points 11.53 m (37 ft 9 3/4 in)	877 points 25.11 s +0.3	634 points 5.27 m (17 ft 3 1/4 in) +0.0	786 points 46.15 m (151 ft 4 3/4 in)	759 points 2:24.84
2018 USA Outdoor Track and Field Championships	6th	5853 points	991 points 13.91 s +0.1	879 points 1.72 m (5 ft 7 1/2 in)	684 points 12.35 m (40 ft 6 in)	893 points 24.93 s -2.0	750 points 5.67 m (18 ft 7 in) +0.2	872 points 50.60 m (166 ft 0 in)	784 points 2:22.95
2018 Thorpe Cup	5th	5849 points	1013 points 13.76 s +1.9	928 points 1.76 m (5 ft 9 1/4 in)	651 points 11.84 m (38 ft 10 in)	852 points 25.38 s -1.3	741 points 5.64 m (18 ft 6 in) +0.0	890 points 51.53 m (169 ft 1/2 in)	774 points 2:23.72
2019 USA Outdoor Track and Field Championships	11th	5875 points	1011 points 13.77 s +0.2	818 points 1.67 m (5 ft 5 1/2 in)	720 points 12.89 m (42 ft 3 1/4 in)	871 points 25.17 s -0.8	771 points 5.74 m (18 ft 9 3/4 in) +2.2	823 points 48.06 m (157 ft 8 in)	861 points 2:17.27

== NCAA ==
Ashtin Zamzow is a Texas Longhorns track and field alum and won 4 Big 12 Conference titles. Ashtin Zamzow is a 1-time USTFCCCA NCAA Division I First-Team All-American (1 at Texas) and 2-time USTFCCCA Second-Team All-American at Texas.

Representing Texas Longhorns track and field
Year	Big 12 Conference Indoor track and field Championship	NCAA Division I Indoor track and field Championship	Big 12 Conference Outdoor track and field Championship	NCAA Division I Outdoor track and field Championship
2018-19	High jump 1.68 m (5 ft 6 in) 9th		Javelin 48.57 m (159 ft 4 in) 1st	Javelin 34.37 m (112 ft 9 in) 96th
2018-19				100 meters hurdles 13.64 64th place
2018-19	pentathlon 4183 points 1st	pentathlon 4294 points 3rd	Heptathlon 5817 points 1st	Heptathlon 6222 points 1st
2017-18	High jump 1.66 m (5 ft 5 1/4 in) 12th		Javelin 45.46 m (149 ft 1 3/4 in) 4th	Javelin 46.40 m (152 ft 2 3/4 in) 38th
2017-18	pentathlon 4076 points 1st		Heptathlon 5662 points 2nd	Heptathlon 5667 points 11th
2015-16	60 metres hurdles 8.96 14th			
2015-16	pentathlon 3965 points 4th		Heptathlon 5215 points 3rd	Heptathlon 5443 points 17th
Representing Texas A&M Aggies track and field
Year	Southeastern Conference Indoor track and field Championship	NCAA Division I Indoor track and field Championship	Southeastern Conference Outdoor track and field Championship	NCAA Division I Outdoor track and field Championship
2014-15	pentathlon 3566 points 13th		Heptathlon 5482 points 9th	
2014-15	High jump NH @ 1.67 m (5 ft 5 1/2 in) 17th		Javelin 41.90 m (137 ft 5 1/2 in) 20th	

== Prep and personal life ==
Ashtin Zamzow previously competed for Texas A&M University, the alma mater of her parents, Kalleen Madden and Stacy Zamzow.

While at Goliad High School, she was the Texas UIL State Champion at 100 meters and 300 meters hurdles.
