= India at the World Athletics Indoor Championships =

India at the World Indoor Championships in Athletics
- WA code: IND
- National federation: Athletics Federation of India
- Medals Ranked TBDth: Gold 0 Silver 0 Bronze 0 Total 0

World Indoor Championships in Athletics appearances
- 1985; 1987; 1989; 1991; 1993; 1995; 1997; 1999; 2001; 2003; 2004; 2006; 2008; 2010; 2012; 2014; 2016; 2018; 2022; 2024

India has participated in the World Indoor Championships in Athletics since its inception in 1985. India is yet to win a medal in the World Indoor Athletics Championships with athletes appearing in 9 out of 20 championships.

== Medalists ==
=== By gender ===
Gender	Gold	Silver	Bronze	Total
Men	0	0	0	0
Women	0	0	0	0

== See also ==
- Indian records in athletics
- India at the Olympics
- India at the Paralympics
