= India at the 2025 World Athletics Championships =

- Flag of India
- WA code: IND

in Tokyo, Japan 13 September 2025 – 21 September 2025
- Competitors: 19 (14 men and 5 women)
- Medals: Gold 0 Silver 0 Bronze 0 Total 0

World Athletics Championships appearances (overview)
- 1983; 1987; 1991; 1993; 1995; 1997; 1999; 2001; 2003; 2005; 2007; 2009; 2011; 2013; 2015; 2017; 2019; 2022; 2023; 2025

India competed at the 2025 World Athletics Championships in Tokyo, Japan, from 13 to 21 September 2025.

== Results ==
India entered 19 athletes to the championships: 5 women and 14 men.

Key

- Q = Qualified for the next round
- q = Qualified for the next round as a fastest loser or, in field events, by position without achieving the qualifying target
- NR = National record
- PB = Personal best
- SB = Season best
- N/A = Round not applicable for the event

=== Men ===
Track and road events

| Athlete | Event | Heat | | Semifinal | | Final | |
| Athlete | Event | Result | Rank | Result | Rank | Result | Rank |
|---|---|---|---|---|---|---|---|
| Animesh Kujur | 200 metres | 20.77 | 9 | Did not advance | | | |
| Gulveer Singh | 5000 metres | 13:42.34 | 9 | Did not advance | | | |
| Gulveer Singh | 10,000 metres | —N/a | | | | 29:13.33 | 16 |
| Tejas Shirse | 110 metres hurdles | 13.57 | 6 | Did not advance | | | |
| Servin Sebastian | 20 kilometres walk | —N/a | | | | 1:23:03 | 31 |
| Ram Baboo | 35 kilometres walk | —N/a | | | | DQ | |
| Sandeep Kumar | 35 kilometres walk | —N/a | | | | 2:39:15 | 23 |

Field events

| Athlete | Event | Qualification | | Final | |
| Athlete | Event | Distance | Position | Distance | Position |
|---|---|---|---|---|---|
| Sarvesh Anil Kushare | High jump | 2.25m | 9 q | 2.28m PB | 6 |
| Murali Sreeshankar | Long jump | 7.78m | 25 | Did not advance | |
| Praveen Chithravel | Triple jump | 16.74m | 15 | Did not advance | |
| Abdulla Aboobacker Narangolintevida | Triple jump | 16.33m | 24 | Did not advance | |
| Neeraj Chopra | Javelin | 84.85m | 6 Q | 84.03m | 8 |
| Yash Vir Singh | Javelin | 77.51m | 30 | Did not advance | |
| Rohit Yadav | Javelin | 77.81m | 28 | Did not advance | |
| Sachin Yadav | Javelin | 83.67m | 10 q | 86.27m PB | 4 |

=== Women ===
Track and road events

| Athlete | Event | Heat | | Semifinal | | Final | |
| Athlete | Event | Result | Rank | Result | Rank | Result | Rank |
|---|---|---|---|---|---|---|---|
| Pooja Olla | 800 metres | 2:01.03 PB | 7 | Did not advance | | | |
| Pooja Olla | 1500 metres | 4:13.75 | 11 | Did not advance | | | |
| Ankita Dhyani | 3000 metres steeplechase | 10:03.22 | 11 | Did not advance | | | |
| Parul Chaudhary | 3000 metres steeplechase | 9:22.24 | 9 | Did not advance | | | |
| Priyanka Goswami | 35 kilometres walk | —N/a | | | | 3:05:58 | 24 |

Field events

| Athlete | Event | Qualification | | Final | |
| Athlete | Event | Distance | Position | Distance | Position |
|---|---|---|---|---|---|
| Annu Rani | Javelin | 55.18 | 29 | Did not advance | |
