= India at the World Athletics Championships =

- WA code: IND
- National federation: Athletics Federation of India
- Medals Ranked 65th: Gold 1 Silver 1 Bronze 1 Total 3

World Athletics Championships appearances (overview)
- 1983; 1987; 1991; 1993; 1995; 1997; 1999; 2001; 2003; 2005; 2007; 2009; 2011; 2013; 2015; 2017; 2019; 2022; 2023; 2025

India has participated in the World Athletics Championships since 1983. Their first ever medal was a Bronze medal won by Anju Bobby George in 2003 in Paris; in the Women's long jump discipline.

Neeraj Chopra is the second Indian to win a medal at the World Athletics Championships. He won a silver medal in the javelin throw at the 2022 World Athletics Championships and subsequently the first gold for India at the 2023 World Athletics Championships.

== Medalists ==
Medal	Name	Year	Event	Date	Ref.
Gold	Neeraj Chopra	(Hungary) 2023 Budapest	Men's javelin throw	27 August 2023	
Silver	Neeraj Chopra	(United States) 2022 Eugene	Men's javelin throw	23 July 2022	
Bronze	Anju Bobby George	(France) 2003 Paris	Women's long jump	30 August 2003	

=== By event ===
Event	Gold	Silver	Bronze	Total
Javelin throw	1	1	0	2
Long jump	0	0	1	1
Totals (2 entries)	1	1	1	3

=== By gender ===
Gender	Gold	Silver	Bronze	Total
Men	1	1	0	2
Women	0	0	1	1

== See also ==
- Indian records in athletics
- India at the Olympics
- India at the Paralympics
