= India at the 2019 World Athletics Championships =

- WA code: IND
- National federation: Athletics Federation of India
- Website: https://indianathletics.in

in Doha, Qatar 27 September 2019 – 6 October 2019
- Competitors: 23 (13 men and 10 women) in 16 events
- Medals: Gold 0 Silver 0 Bronze 0 Total 0

World Athletics Championships appearances (overview)
- 1983; 1987; 1991; 1993; 1995; 1997; 1999; 2001; 2003; 2005; 2007; 2009; 2011; 2013; 2015; 2017; 2019; 2022; 2023

India competed at the 2019 World Athletics Championships in Doha, Qatar, from 24 September to 6 October 2019. India was represented by 23 athletes.

== Results ==
Key

- Q = Qualified for the next round
- q = Not qualified for the next round as a fastest loser or, in field events, by position without achieving the qualifying target
- NR = National record
- PB = Personal best
- SB = Season best
- N/A = Round not applicable for the event

=== Men ===
Track and road events

Athlete	Event	Heat		Semifinal		Final	
Athlete	Event	Result	Rank	Result	Rank	Result	Rank
Jinson Johnson	1500 metres	3:39:86	34	—			
Gopi Thonakal	Marathon	—				2:15:57	21
M. P. Jabir	400 metres hurdles	49.62	3 Q	49.71	5	Did not advance	
Dharun Ayyasamy	400 metres hurdles	50.55	6	Did not advance			
Avinash Sable	3000 metres steeplechase	8:25.23 NR	7 q	—		8:21.37 NR	13
Irfan Kolothum Thodi	20 kilometres walk	—				1:35:21	27
Devender Singh	20 kilometres walk	—				1:41:48	36
Muhammed Anas; Amoj Jacob; K. S. Jeevan; Noah Nirmal Tom; Dharun Ayyasamy; Alex Antony; Harsh Kumar	4 × 400 metres relay	3:03.09	12	—		Did not advance	

Field events

Athlete	Event	Qualification		Final	
Athlete	Event	Distance	Position	Distance	Position
Shivpal Singh	Javelin throw	78.97m	24	Did not advance	
M. Sreeshankar	Long jump	7.62m	22	Did not advance	
Tejinder Pal Singh Toor	Shot put	20.43m SB	18	Did not advance	

=== Women ===
Track and road events

Athlete	Event	Heat		Semifinal		Final	
Athlete	Event	Result	Rank	Result	Rank	Result	Rank
Dutee Chand	100 metres	11.48	7	Did not advance			
Archana Suseendran	200 metres	23:65	8	Did not advance			
Anjali Devi	400 metres	52:33	6	Did not advance			
P. U. Chitra	1500 metres	4:11.10 PB	8	Did not advance			
Jisna Mathew; M. R. Poovamma; V. K. Vismaya; Subha Venkatesan; V. Revathi; R. Vithya	4 × 400 metres relay	3:29.42 SB	11	—		Did not advance	

Field events

Athlete	Event	Qualification		Final	
Athlete	Event	Distance	Position	Distance	Position
Annu Rani	Javelin throw	62.43m NR	5 Q	61.12m	8

=== Mixed ===
Track and road events

Athlete	Event	Heat		Semifinal		Final	
Athlete	Event	Result	Rank	Result	Rank	Result	Rank
Muhammed Anas; V. K. Vismaya; Jisna Mathew; Noah Nirmal Tom	4 × 400 metres relay	3:16.14	3 Q	—		3:15.77 SB	7
