= AAFI =

AAFI may refer to:

- All American Foods, food ingredient manufacturer, US
- Amateur Athletic Federation of India, former name of the Athletics Federation of India
- Association of Indonesia Futsal Academy (Indonesian: Asosiasi Akademi Futsal Indonesia), sport association for futsal
- Australians Against Further Immigration, former political party, Australia
