= India at the 2022 World Athletics Championships =

- Flag of India
- WA code: IND
- National federation: Athletics Federation of India
- Website: https://indianathletics.in

in Eugene, United States 15–24 July 2022
- Competitors: 21 (17 men and 4 women) in 12 events
- Medals Ranked 33rd: Gold 0 Silver 1 Bronze 0 Total 1

World Athletics Championships appearances (overview)
- 1983; 1987; 1991; 1993; 1995; 1997; 1999; 2001; 2003; 2005; 2007; 2009; 2011; 2013; 2015; 2017; 2019; 2022; 2023; 2025

India competed at the 2022 World Athletics Championships in Eugene, Oregon, from 15 to 24 July 2022. India had entered 21 athletes. India won their first silver at the World Athletics Championships since their debut in the games. Neeraj Chopra became the first male Indian athlete to win a medal at the World Athletics Championships.

== Medalists ==
Medal	Athlete	Event	Date
Silver	Neeraj Chopra	Men's javelin throw	23 July

== Results ==
Key

- Q = Qualified for the next round
- q = Qualified for the next round as a fastest loser or, in field events, by position without achieving the qualifying target
- NR = National record
- PB = Personal best
- SB = Season best
- N/A = Round not applicable for the event

=== Men ===
Noah Nirmal Tom and Amoj Jacob did not compete (both were named to the 4x400 relay team).

Track and road events

Athlete	Event	Heat		Semifinal		Final	
Athlete	Event	Result	Rank	Result	Rank	Result	Rank
M. P. Jabir	400 metres hurdles	50.76	31	Did not advance			
Avinash Sable	3000 metres steeplechase	8:18.75	7 Q	—		8:31.75	11
Sandeep Kumar	20 kilometres walk	—				1:31:58	40
Muhammed Anas; Muhammed Ajmal; Naganathan Pandi; Rajesh Ramesh	4 × 400 metres relay	3:07.29	12	—		Did not advance	

Field events

Athlete	Event	Qualification		Final	
Athlete	Event	Distance	Position	Distance	Position
M. Sreeshankar	Long jump	8.00m	7 Q	7.96m	7
Jeswin Aldrin	Long jump	7.79m	20	Did not advance	
Muhammed Anees Yahiya	Long jump	7.73m	23	Did not advance	
Praveen Chithravel	Triple jump	16.49m	17	Did not advance	
Abdulla Aboobacker	Triple jump	16.45m	19	Did not advance	
Eldhose Paul	Triple jump	16.68m	12 q	16.79m	9
Tejinder Pal Singh Toor	Shot put	NM		Did not advance	
Neeraj Chopra	Javelin throw	88.39m	2 Q	88.13m	2nd place, silver medalist(s)
Rohit Yadav	Javelin throw	80.42m	11 q	78.72m	10

=== Women ===
Aishwarya Mishra did not compete.

Track and road events

Athlete	Event	Heat		Semifinal		Final	
Athlete	Event	Result	Rank	Result	Rank	Result	Rank
Parul Chaudhary	5000 metres	15:54.03	31	—		Did not advance	
Parul Chaudhary	3000 metres steeplechase	9:38.09 PB	31	—		Did not advance	
Priyanka Goswami	20 kilometres walk	—				1:39:42	34

Field events

Athlete	Event	Qualification		Final	
Athlete	Event	Distance	Position	Distance	Position
Annu Rani	Javelin throw	59.60n	8 q	61.12m	7
