= Athletics at the 2026 Asian Games – Women's 1500 metres =

Women's 1500 metres at the 2026 Asian Games
- Venue: Mizuho Park Athletic Stadium, Nagoya
- Date: 26 September 2026
- Competitors: 11 from 8 nations

Medalists
gold medal	Nelly Korir	Bahrain
silver medal	Li Chunhui	China
bronze medal	Nozomi Tanaka	Japan

The women's 1500 metres competition at the 2026 Asian Games took place on 26 September 2026 at the Mizuho Park Athletic Stadium in Nagoya, Japan. Nelly Korir of Bahrain won the gold medal with a Games Record time of 4:04.50, while Li Chunhui of China and Nozomi Tanaka of Japan won the silver and bronze medals respectively.

== Schedule ==
All times are Japan Standard Time (UTC+09:00)

Schedule
Date	Time	Event
Saturday, 26 September	18:45	Final

== Records ==
Prior to this competition, the existing world, Asian and Games records were as follows.

World Record	Faith Kipyegon (KEN)	3:48.68	Eugene, United States	6 May 2025
Asian Record	Qu Yunxia (CHN)	3:50.46	Beijing, China	10 July 1993
Games Record	Sunita Rani (IND)	4:06.03	Busan, South Korea	9 October 2002

== Results ==
Rank	Bib	Athlete	Result	Gap	Notes
1st place, gold medalist(s)	221	Nelly Korir (BRN)	4:04.50		GR
2nd place, silver medalist(s)	261	Li Chunhui (CHN)	4:05.50	+1.00	PB
3rd place, bronze medalist(s)	439	Nozomi Tanaka (JPN)	4:06.14	+1.64	
4	339	Parul Chaudhary (IND)	4:09.46	+4.96	PB
5	499	Park Na-yeon (KOR)	4:14.96	+10.46	
6	333	Pooja Olla (IND)	4:16.78	+12.28	
7	783	Sabokhat Samijonova (UZB)	4:18.23	+13.73	PB
8	428	Mizuki Michishita (JPN)	4:21.24	+16.74	
9	496	Kim Yu-jin (KOR)	4:22.89	+18.39	
10	459	Aiana Bolatbekkyzy (KAZ)	4:30.27	+25.77	
11	566	Purna Neupane (NEP)	4:45.58	+41.08	
