= Parvej Khan =

Indian athlete

Personal information
- Born: 26 December 2004 (age 21) Nuh district, Haryana, India

Sport
- Sport: Track and field
- Events: 800 metres, 1500 metres
- Club: Florida Gators

Achievements and titles
- Personal bests: 1 mile: 3:55.41 (Boston, 2024); 1500m: 3:36.21 (Portland, Oregon, 2024); 800m: 1:46.12 (Florida, 2024)

Parvej Khan (born 26 December 2004) is an Indian track athlete from Haryana. He won the 1500m race at the 2024 SEC Outdoor Track & Field Championships in Florida. He also won the gold medal in the 800m at the U-16 nationals in Mangalgiri. In August 2025, he was banned from competition for six years due to doping and rules violations.

== Early life and training ==
He hails from Chahalka village in the Nuh district of Haryana. He is the son of a farmer, Nafees Ali, who cultivated wheat and cattle fodder on their five acres of land. He began running at a young age, initially inspired by his desire to prepare for army recruitment. Recognizing his talent, he sought better opportunities and moved to New Delhi at the age of 13. In New Delhi, he trained at Jawaharlal Nehru Stadium and later at the Sports Authority of India (SAI) in Bhopal under coach Anupama Srivastava.

== Achievements ==
- World Rankings: Parvej Khan has achieved a personal best world ranking of 187th in the Men's 1500m and 292nd in the Men's 800m.
- Boston University DMR Challenge: He ran the mile short track in 3:55.41 on February 16, 2024, placing second.
- NCAA Division I Indoor Championships: Parvej finished the mile short track in 3:57.13 on March 8, 2024, securing second place in his category.
- Pepsi Florida Relays: He completed the 800m with a time of 1:46.12 on March 30, 2024, coming in second.
- SEC Indoor Championships: Parvej was crowned the SEC Individual Champion in the Men's Mile with a time of 4:00.18, becoming the first Gator to win the SEC Indoor Championship in the Men's Mile since 2011.
- National Records: He set a personal and Indian national record in the Men's Mile at the David Hemery Valentine Invitational with a time of 3:56.642.
- Indian National Games: At the Indian National Games in Gujarat, he won the 1500m with a time of 3:40.89 on September 30, 2022.

== Doping ban ==
In August 2024, Khan was provisionally suspended from competition by the National Anti-Doping Agency after testing positive for erythropoietin (EPO). In August 2025, he was banned from competition for six years due to the positive test and rules violations.

== Professional ==
representing Athletics Federation of India
2024 Indian National Open Athletics Championships	1500 m	3:42.95	(gold) 1st
2023 Indian National Open Athletics Championships	1500 m	3:56.95	25th
2023 Indian National Open Athletics Championships	800 m	1:56.81	7th
2022 Indian National Open Athletics Championships	1500 m	3:46.41	(gold) 1st
2022 Indian National U23 Championships	1500 m	3:51.79	(gold) 1st
2022 Indian National U23 Championships	800 m	1:47.96	(gold) 1st
2021 Indian National Open Athletics Championships	1500 m	3:42.64	(gold) 1st
2019 Indian National U16 Championships	800 m	1:54.78	(gold) 1st

== NCAA ==
Khan is a 2-time SEC middle-distance running champion.

representing South Carolina Gamecocks
2024 NCAA Division I Outdoor Track and Field Championships	1500 m	3:40.10	17th
2024 Southeastern Conference Outdoor Track and Field Championships	1500 m	3:42.73	(gold) 1st
2024 Southeastern Conference Outdoor Track and Field Championships	800 m	1:46.80	(bronze) 3rd
2023 NCAA Division I Indoor Track and Field Championships	Mile	4:03.05	7th
2023 Southeastern Conference Indoor Track and Field Championships	Mile	4:00.18	(gold) 1st
2023 NCAA Division I Cross Country Championships South Region	10 km	31:00.5	66th
2023 Southeastern Conference Cross Country Championships	8 km	24:22.8	34th
