= India at the 2017 World Championships in Athletics =

- WA code: IND
- National federation: Athletics Federation of India

in London
- Competitors: 25 in 14 events
- Medals: Gold 0 Silver 0 Bronze 0 Total 0

World Championships in Athletics appearances
- 1983; 1987; 1991; 1993; 1995; 1997; 1999; 2001; 2003; 2005; 2007; 2009; 2011; 2013; 2015; 2017; 2019; 2022; 2023; 2025

India competed at the 2017 World Championships in Athletics in London, United Kingdom, from 4–13 August 2017.

== Results ==
Key

- Q = Qualified for the next round
- q = Qualified for the next round as a fastest loser or, in field events, by position without achieving the qualifying target
- NR = National record
- PB = Personal best
- SB = Season best
- N/A = Round not applicable for the event

=== Men ===
Track and road events

Athlete	Event	Heat		Semifinal		Final	
Athlete	Event	Result	Rank	Result	Rank	Result	Rank
Mohammad Anas	400 metres	45.98	33	Did not advance			
Govindan Lakshmanan	5000 metres	13:35.69 PB	31	—N/a		Did not advance	
Gopi Thonakal	Marathon	—N/a				2:17:13	28
Siddhant Thingalaya	110 metres hurdles	13.64	31	Did not advance			
Kunhu Muhammed; Amoj Jacob; Mohammad Anas; Arokia Rajiv	4 × 400 metres relay	3:02.80 SB	10	—N/a		Did not advance	
Irfan Kolothum Thodi	20 kilometres walk	—N/a				1:21:40	23
Devender Singh	20 kilometres walk	—N/a				1:25:47	50
Ganapathi Krishnan	20 kilometres walk	—N/a				1:28:32	54

Field events

Athlete	Event	Qualification		Final	
Athlete	Event	Distance	Position	Distance	Position
Neeraj Chopra	Javelin throw	82.26m	15	Did not advance	
Davinder Singh Kang	Javelin throw	84.22m	7 Q	80.02m	12

=== Women ===
Track and road events

Athlete	Event	Heat		Semifinal		Final	
Athlete	Event	Result	Rank	Result	Rank	Result	Rank
Dutee Chand	100 metres	12.07	38	Did not advance			
Nirmala Sheoran	400 metres	52.01	21 q	53.07	22	Did not advance	
Monika Athare	Marathon	—N/a				2:49:54	64
Jisna Mathew; M. R. Poovamma; Anilda Thomas; Nirmala Sheoran	4 × 400 metres relay	DQ	–	—N/a		Did not advance	
Khushbir Kaur	20 kilometres walk	—N/a				1:36:41	42

Field events

Athlete	Event	Qualification		Final	
Athlete	Event	Distance	Position	Distance	Position
Annu Rani	Javelin throw	59.93m	20	Did not advance	

Combined events – Heptathlon

Athlete	Event	100H	HJ	SP	200 m	LJ	JT	800 m	Final	Rank
Swapna Barman	Result	14.14	1.71	10.81	26.45	5.53	43.49	2:20.17	5431	26
Swapna Barman	Points	959	867	583	758	709	734	821	5431	26
