= India at the 1991 World Championships in Athletics =

India at the 1991 World Athletics Championships
- Flag of India
- WA code: IND
- National federation: Athletics Federation of India
- Website: https://indianathletics.in

in Tokyo, Japan 24 August–1 September 1991
- Competitors: 5 (1 man and 4 women) in 2 events
- Medals: Gold 0 Silver 0 Bronze 0 Total 0

World Athletics Championships appearances (overview)
- 1983; 1987; 1991; 1993; 1995; 1997; 1999; 2001; 2003; 2005; 2007; 2009; 2011; 2013; 2015; 2017; 2019; 2022; 2023; 2025

India competed at the 1991 World Athletics Championships in Tokyo, Japan from 24 August to 1 September 1991.

== Results ==
Key

- Q = Qualified for the next round
- q = Qualified for the next round as a fastest loser or, in field events, by position without achieving the qualifying target
- NR = National record
- PB = Personal best
- SB = Season best
- N/A = Round not applicable for the event

=== Men ===
Track events

Athlete	Event	Heat		Final	
Athlete	Event	Result	Rank	Result	Rank
Deena Ram	3000mSC	9:05.21	11	Did Not Advance	

=== Women ===
Track events

Athlete	Event	Heat		Final	
Athlete	Event	Result	Rank	Result	Rank
Ashwini Nachappa; Alphonsa Rayen; Sylvina Cecil Pais; Saramma Kutty	4 × 400 metres relay	3:38.54	7	Did Not Advance	
