= Pulluvila =

Village in Thiruvananthapuram district of Kerala state, India

Coordinates: 8.347412°N 77.037736°E

Pulluvila is a village between Kovalam and Poovar in Thiruvananthapuram district of Kerala state, India, hardly 7 km (4.3 mi) away from the Vizhinjam Port. The main occupation of this village is fishing, and more than 80% of the people belong to the Latin Catholic Mukkuva community. This village is also well known in beach football. Many talented sportspersons have emerged from this village. The village is well known for its religious harmony. Christians, Muslims, and Hindus co-exist peacefully with each other.Its main attraction is the Christian St. Jacob Forane Church.

== Community centers ==
Beaches are the common and favourite community center for the locals in the village. Most of the villagers spend their evenings at the beaches which are also used for playing football every evening by the local children of the village. Other community centers are;

- St. Jacob's Community Hall, Pulluvila
- Madonna Hall, Kochupally
- Tsunami Market, Valiyapally
- Kochupally Market, Pulluvila
- SA Theatre, Pulluvila
- 2685

== Sports ==
Pulluvila is a land where many athletes have emerged from, like many other coastal villages in Thiruvananthapuram. Pozhiyoor is known for footballers and Pulluvila known for all kind of sports and athletics. Indian Cricketer Sanju Samson, Olympian Alex Antony, Footballer Bijoy Varghese are some of the notable people from the village. Apart from them many footballers plays for different ISL, I-League, KPL teams. Not just boys, many girls are also part of state and national teams of rugby, football, etc,. Like football many boys play volleyball and participate to local tournaments.

Many Sports and Arts clubs boost youngsters to achieve their goals at sports. Some of the active sports and arts clubs are;

- Jaihind Sports and Arts Club, Pulluvila
- Friends Sports and Arts Club, Pulluvila
- Kalasagar Sports and Arts Club, Pulluvila
- St. Peter's Sports and Arts Club, Kochupally
- St. Jacob's Sports and Arts Club, Valiyapally
- Swaraj Sports and Arts Club, Pulluvila
- Brothers Sports and Arts Club, Pulluvila
- Galaxy Sports and Arts Club, Pulluvila

Pulluvila is also gifted with many beach football grounds. Leo XIII School ground is a common Sports area to practice any games. List of the mud grounds at Pulluvila;

- Leo XIII School Ground
- St. Peter's Stadium
- Jaihind Stadium
- Friends Club 5's Ground
- Swaraj Mud Ground
- Kalasagar Ground

== Libraries ==
Jaihind Library is the oldest library in Pulluvila. A Sports and Arts club also works along with the library from the beginning. And many footballers has risen from the club and been part of the various santhosh trophy teams. Apart from that a Vanita library called Friends Vanitha Library and Kalasagar Library are also situated in the village. During the Covid-19 pandemic period, which was serious in Pulluvila, these libraries helped the local student in their studies through becoming community study centers.

== Healthcare centers ==
- Pulluvila CHC
- Brother's Hospital, Pulluvila
- St. Joseph Hospital, Kochupally
- Swastika Homeopathic Medical Centre, Pulluvila

== Religious institutions ==
- St. Jacob's Forane Church, Pulluvila
- St. Peter's Catholic Church, Kochupally
- Keezhathil Mudippura Temple, Pulluvila
- Malankara Catholic Church, Pulluvila
- Jum-a-musjid, Pulluvila
- St. Francis Xavier's Church, Vellelunbu
- Sree Mathru Devi Temple, Pulluvila
- Deepa Sadan Convent, Pulluvila
- Madona Bhavan, Kochupally
- St. Jude's Convent, Pulluvila
- St. Nicholas' Church, Puthiyathura is part of Pulluvila parish

== Educational institutions ==
- Leo XIII HSS Pulluvila
- St. Mary's LPS Pulluvila
- Children's Palace, Kindergarten, Kochupally
- St. Jude English Medium Nursery, Pulluvila
- New Balabhavan Nursery, Pulluvila
- Govt. Muhammadan LPS Pulluvila

== Notable people ==
- Sanju Samson, Cricketer and Chennai Super Kings cricketer
- Bijoy Varghese, Footballer, plays for Kerala Blasters
- Alex Antony, Indian Olympian (Athlete)

== Administration ==
Pulluvila is part of Neyyattinkara Taluk in Thiruvananthapuram district. It comes under Karumkulam Panchayath.

== Access ==
Pulluvila is 27 km (17 mi) from Thiruvananthapuram, 10 km (6.2 mi) from Neyyattinkara and 50 km (31 mi) from Nagercoil.

== Post office ==
Pulluvila village has a post office and the postal code is 695526.
