= India at the 1999 World Championships in Athletics =

India at the 1999 World Athletics Championships
- Flag of India
- WA code: IND
- National federation: Athletics Federation of India
- Website: https://indianathletics.in

in Seville, Spain 21–29 August 1999
- Competitors: 8 (1 man and 7 women) in 5 events
- Medals: Gold 0 Silver 0 Bronze 0 Total 0

World Athletics Championships appearances (overview)
- 1983; 1987; 1991; 1993; 1995; 1997; 1999; 2001; 2003; 2005; 2007; 2009; 2011; 2013; 2015; 2017; 2019; 2022; 2023; 2025

India competed at the 1999 World Athletics Championships in Seville, Spain from 21 to 29 August 1999.

== Results ==
Key

- Q = Qualified for the next round
- q = Qualified for the next round as a fastest loser or, in field events, by position without achieving the qualifying target
- NR = National record
- PB = Personal best
- SB = Season best
- N/A = Round not applicable for the event

=== Men ===
Field events

Athlete	Event	Qualification		Final	
Athlete	Event	Distance	Position	Distance	Position
Shakti Singh	Shot Put	18.58m	23	Did not advance	

=== Women ===
Track events

Athlete	Event	Heat		Final	
Athlete	Event	Result	Rank	Result	Rank
Sunita Rani	5000 metres	15:41:81	10	Did Not Advance	
M.K Asha; K. Mathews Beenamol; Rosa Kutty; Jincy Phillip	4 × 400 metres relay	3:36.54	4	Did Not Advance	

Field events

Athlete	Event	Qualification		Final	
Athlete	Event	Distance	Position	Distance	Position
Neelam Jaswant Singh	Discus Throw	57.05m	27	Did not advance	
Gurmeet Kaur	Javelin Throw	51.97m	26	Did not advance	
