= Indian Athletics League =

Indian Athletics League is a proposed league in India. It will be organized by Athletics Federation of India. This tournament will also have similarities with 14-leg Diamond League Series. There will be 8 to 10 franchise with each having 2 or 3 foreign players. There will be 8 players per franchise for both Men and Women.

An event was planned for August 2014.

Current this proposal is put on hold by AFI Executive Committee. 10 additional Indian athletics events were announced following the 2024 Summer Olympics.
