= Chandan Singh =

Chandan Singh may refer to:

- Chandan Singh (air vice marshal) (1925–2020), Indian military officer
- Chandan Singh (athlete) (born 1987), Indian racewalker
- Chandan Singh (politician), Indian politician from Bihar
- Chandan Singh (Uttar Pradesh politician), Indian politician; represented Kairana Lok Sabha constituency 1977–1980

== See also ==
- Chandan Singh Rawat (1928–2008), Indian footballer
