= India at the 2013 World Championships in Athletics =

- WA code: IND
- National federation: Athletics Federation of India

in Moscow
- Competitors: 15 (7 men and 8 women) in 7 events
- Medals: Gold 0 Silver 0 Bronze 0 Total 0

World Championships in Athletics appearances
- 1983; 1987; 1991; 1993; 1995; 1997; 1999; 2001; 2003; 2005; 2007; 2009; 2011; 2013; 2015; 2017; 2019; 2022; 2023

India competed at the 2013 World Championships in Athletics from August 10 to August 18 in Moscow, Russia. A team of 15 athletes was announced to represent the country in the event.

== Results ==
(q – qualified, NM – no mark, SB – season best)

=== Men ===
==== Walking events ====
Athlete	Event	Final	
Athlete	Event	Time	Rank
Irfan Kolothum Thodi	Men's 20 kilometres walk	DQ	NA
Gurmeet Singh	Men's 20 kilometres walk	1:26:47	33
Chandan Singh	Men's 20 kilometres walk	1:26:51	34
Basanta Bahadur Rana	Men's 50 kilometres walk	3:58:20	33
Sandeep Kumar	Men's 50 kilometres walk	DQ	NA

==== Field events ====
Athlete	Event	Preliminaries		Final	
Athlete	Event	Distance	Rank	Distance	Rank
Vikas Gowda	Discus throw	63.64m	7 q	64.03m	7
Renjith Maheswary	Triple jump	16.63m	13	Did not Advance	

=== Women ===
==== Walking events ====
Athlete	Event	Final	
Athlete	Event	Time	Rank
Khushbir Kaur	Women's 20 kilometres walk	1:34:28 NR	39

==== Track events ====
Athlete	Event	Heats		Final	
Athlete	Event	Time	Rank	Time	Rank
Sudha Singh	3000 m steeplechase	9:51.05	23	did not advance	
Nirmala; Tintu Luka; Anu Mariam Jose; M. R. Poovamma	4 × 400 m relay	3:38.81	15	did not advance	
