= India at the 2003 World Championships in Athletics =

India at the 2003 World Athletics Championships

India at the 2003 World Athletics Championships
- Flag of India
- WA code: IND
- National federation: Athletics Federation of India
- Website: https://indianathletics.in

in Saint-Denis, Seine-Saint-Denis, France 23–31 August 2003
- Competitors: 6 (6 women) in 3 events
- Medals Ranked 40th: Gold 0 Silver 0 Bronze 1 Total 1

World Athletics Championships appearances (overview)
- 1983; 1987; 1991; 1993; 1995; 1997; 1999; 2001; 2003; 2005; 2007; 2009; 2011; 2013; 2015; 2017; 2019; 2022; 2023; 2025

India competed at the 2003 World Athletics Championships in Saint-Denis, France from 23 to 31 August 2003. Anju Bobby George became the first Indian athlete to win a medal at the World Championships in Athletics by securing a bronze in the women's long jump.

== Medalists ==
Medal	Athlete	Event	Date
Bronze	Anju Bobby George	Women's long jump	30 August

== Results ==
Track and road events

Athletes	Event	Heat		Semifinal		Final	
Athletes	Event	Result	Rank	Result	Rank	Result	Rank
Kalpana Reddy, Sathi Geetha, Sagardeep Kaur, Manjeet Kaur	Women's 4 × 400 metres relay	3:45.25	5	Did not advance		—	

Field events

Athlete	Event	Qualification		Final	
Athlete	Event	Distance	Position	Distance	Position
Neelam Jaswant Singh	Women's discus throw	60.33 m	11	57.92 m	12
Anju Bobby George	Women's long jump	6.59 m	6	6.70 m	Bronze
