= India at the 1987 World Championships in Athletics =

India at the 1987 World Athletics Championships
- Flag of India
- WA code: IND
- National federation: Athletics Federation of India
- Website: https://indianathletics.in

in Tokyo, Japan 29 August–6 September 1987
- Competitors: 7 (1 man and 6 women) in 4 events
- Medals: Gold 0 Silver 0 Bronze 0 Total 0

World Athletics Championships appearances (overview)
- 1983; 1987; 1991; 1993; 1995; 1997; 1999; 2001; 2003; 2005; 2007; 2009; 2011; 2013; 2015; 2017; 2019; 2022; 2023; 2025

India competed at the 1987 World Athletics Championships in Rome, Italy from 29 August to 6 September 1987.

== Results ==
Key

- Q = Qualified for the next round
- q = Qualified for the next round as a fastest loser or, in field events, by position without achieving the qualifying target
- NR = National record
- PB = Personal best
- SB = Season best
- N/A = Round not applicable for the event

=== Men ===
Road events

Athlete	Event	Final	
Athlete	Event	Result	Rank
Hari Singh	Marathon	2:34:20	42

=== Women ===
Track events

Athlete	Event	Heat		Semi-Final		Final	
Athlete	Event	Result	Rank	Result	Rank	Result	Rank
P.T Usha	400mH	55.73	3 Q	55.89	6	Did Not Advance	
Ashwini Nachappa; Vandana Shanbag; Sany Joseph; Vandana Rao	4 × 100 metres relay	46.32	7	—N/a		Did Not Advance	
Vandana Shanbag; Vandana Rao; Shiny Wilson; P.T Usha	4 × 400 metres relay	3:31.55	8	—N/a		Did Not Advance	
