= India at the 2001 World Championships in Athletics =

India at the 2001 World Athletics Championships
- Flag of India
- WA code: IND
- National federation: Athletics Federation of India
- Website: https://indianathletics.in

in Edmonton, Canada 3–12 August 2001
- Competitors: 4 (1 man and 3 women) in 4 events
- Medals: Gold 0 Silver 0 Bronze 0 Total 0

World Athletics Championships appearances (overview)
- 1983; 1987; 1991; 1993; 1995; 1997; 1999; 2001; 2003; 2005; 2007; 2009; 2011; 2013; 2015; 2017; 2019; 2022; 2023; 2025

India competed at the 2001 World Athletics Championships in Edmonton, Canada from 3 to 12 August 2001.

== Results ==
Key

- Q = Qualified for the next round
- q = Qualified for the next round as a fastest loser or, in field events, by position without achieving the qualifying target
- NR = National record
- PB = Personal best
- SB = Season best
- N/A = Round not applicable for the event

=== Men ===
Field events

Athlete	Event	Qualification		Final	
Athlete	Event	Distance	Position	Distance	Position
Sanjay Kumar Rai	Long Jump	7.24m	26	Did not advance	

=== Women ===
Track events

Athlete	Event	Heat		Semi-Final		Final	
Athlete	Event	Result	Rank	Result	Rank	Result	Rank
K. Mathews Beenamol	400 metres	52.17	5 q	52.68	8	Did Not Advance	

Field events

Athlete	Event	Qualification		Final	
Athlete	Event	Distance	Position	Distance	Position
Neelam Jaswant Singh	Discus Throw	56.52m	18	Did not advance	

Combined events – Heptathlon

Athlete	Event	100H	HJ	SP	200 m	LJ	JT	800 m	Final	Rank
G. Pramila Ganapathy	Result	14.41	1.73	11.43	25.04	5.92	34.60	2:22.89	5492	15
G. Pramila Ganapathy	Points	921	891	623	883	825	564	785	5492	15
