= India at the 2007 World Championships in Athletics =

India at the 2007 World Athletics Championships
- Flag of India
- WA code: IND
- National federation: Athletics Federation of India
- Website: https://indianathletics.in

in Osaka, Japan 25 August–2 September 2007
- Competitors: 10 (4 men and 6 women) in 6 events
- Medals: Gold 0 Silver 0 Bronze 0 Total 0

World Athletics Championships appearances (overview)
- 1983; 1987; 1991; 1993; 1995; 1997; 1999; 2001; 2003; 2005; 2007; 2009; 2011; 2013; 2015; 2017; 2019; 2022; 2023; 2025

India competed at the 2007 World Athletics Championships in Osaka, Japan from 25 August to 2 September 2007.

== Results ==
Key

- Q = Qualified for the next round
- q = Qualified for the next round as a fastest loser or, in field events, by position without achieving the qualifying target
- NR = National record
- PB = Personal best
- SB = Season best
- N/A = Round not applicable for the event

=== Men ===
Track Events

Athlete	Event	Heat		Semifinal		Final	
Athlete	Event	Result	Rank	Result	Rank	Result	Rank
Joseph Abraham	400mH	49.64	6 q	49.51 NR	7	Did not advance	

Field events

Athlete	Event	Qualification		Final	
Athlete	Event	Distance	Position	Distance	Position
Navpreet Singh	Shot Put	19.35m	30	Did not advance	
Renjith Maheswary	Triple Jump	16.38m	26	Did not advance	

=== Women ===
Track events

Athlete	Event	Heat		Final	
Athlete	Event	Result	Rank	Result	Rank
Mandeep Kaur; Manjeet Kaur; Chitra K Soman; Iyleen Samantha Lawrence Anthnoy	4 × 400 metres relay	DQ	Did Not Advance		

Field events

Athlete	Event	Qualification		Final	
Athlete	Event	Distance	Position	Distance	Position
Krishna Poonia	Discus Throw	57.17m	22	Did not advance	
Anju Bobby George	Long Jump	6.60m	11 q	6.53m	9
