= India at the 2005 World Championships in Athletics =

India at the 2005 World Athletics Championships
- Flag of India
- WA code: IND
- National federation: Athletics Federation of India
- Website: https://indianathletics.in

6–14 August 2005
- Competitors: 3 (1 man and 2 women) in 3 events
- Medals: Gold 0 Silver 0 Bronze 0 Total 0

World Athletics Championships appearances (overview)
- 1983; 1987; 1991; 1993; 1995; 1997; 1999; 2001; 2003; 2005; 2007; 2009; 2011; 2013; 2015; 2017; 2019; 2022; 2023; 2025

India competed at the 2005 World Athletics Championships in Helsinki, Finland from 6 to 14 August 2005.

== Results ==
Field events

Athlete	Event	Qualification		Final	
Athlete	Event	Distance	Position	Distance	Position
Vikas Gowda	Men's Discus Throw	62.04m	14	Did not advance	
Neelam Jaswant Singh	Women's Discus Throw	56.70m	DSQ	Did not advance	
Anju Bobby George	Women's Long Jump	6.54m	9	6.66m	4
