= India at the 1995 World Championships in Athletics =

India at the 1995 World Athletics Championships
- Flag of India
- WA code: IND
- National federation: Athletics Federation of India
- Website: https://indianathletics.in

in Goteborg, Sweden 5–13 August 1995
- Competitors: 2 (1 man and 1 woman) in 2 events
- Medals: Gold 0 Silver 0 Bronze 0 Total 0

World Athletics Championships appearances (overview)
- 1983; 1987; 1991; 1993; 1995; 1997; 1999; 2001; 2003; 2005; 2007; 2009; 2011; 2013; 2015; 2017; 2019; 2022; 2023; 2025

India competed at the 1995 World Athletics Championships in Goteborg, Sweden from 5 to 13 August 1995.

== Results ==
Key

- Q = Qualified for the next round
- q = Qualified for the next round as a fastest loser or, in field events, by position without achieving the qualifying target
- NR = National record
- PB = Personal best
- SB = Season best
- N/A = Round not applicable for the event

=== Men ===
Track events

Athlete	Event	Heat		Final	
Athlete	Event	Result	Rank	Result	Rank
Bahadur Prasad	5000 metres	14:08.51	6	Did Not Advance	

=== Women ===
Track events

Athlete	Event	Heat		Semi-Final		Final	
Athlete	Event	Result	Rank	Result	Rank	Result	Rank
Jyotirmoy Sikdar	800 metres	2:03.68	6	Did Not Advance			
