= India at the 2003 World Indoor Championships in Athletics =

India at the 2003 IAAF World Indoor Championships
- Flag of India
- WA code: IND
- National federation: Athletics Federation of India
- Website: https://indianathletics.in

in Birmingham, UK 14–16 March 2003
- Competitors: 1 (0 men and 1 woman) in 1 event
- Medals: Gold 0 Silver 0 Bronze 0 Total 0

World Indoor Championships in Athletics appearances
- 1985; 1987; 1989; 1991; 1993; 1995; 1997; 1999; 2001; 2003; 2004; 2006; 2008; 2010; 2012; 2014; 2016; 2018; 2022; 2024

India competed at the 2003 IAAF World Indoor Championships in Birmingham, UK from 14th to 16th March 2003.

== Results ==
Key

- Q = Qualified for the next round
- q = Qualified for the next round as a fastest loser or, in field events, by position without achieving the qualifying target
- NR = National record
- PB = Personal best
- SB = Season best
- NM = No Mark (Failed to register any distance)
- N/A = Round not applicable for the event

=== Women ===
Field events

Athlete	Event	Final	
Athlete	Event	Distance	Position
Anju Bobby George	Long Jump	6.40m	7
