= India at the 2023 World Athletics Championships =

- Flag of India
- WA code: IND
- National federation: Athletics Federation of India
- Website: https://indianathletics.in

in Budapest, Hungary 19–27 August 2023
- Competitors: 28 (23 men and 5 women)
- Medals Ranked 18th: Gold 1 Silver 0 Bronze 0 Total 1

World Athletics Championships appearances (overview)
- 1983; 1987; 1991; 1993; 1995; 1997; 1999; 2001; 2003; 2005; 2007; 2009; 2011; 2013; 2015; 2017; 2019; 2022; 2023

India competed at the 2023 World Athletics Championships in Budapest, Hungary from 19 to 27 August 2023.

== Medalists ==
Medal	Athlete	Event	Date
Gold	Neeraj Chopra	Men's javelin throw	27 August

== Results ==
India entered 28 athletes.

Key

- Q = Qualified for the next round
- q = Qualified for the next round as a fastest loser or, in field events, by position without achieving the qualifying target
- NR = National record
- PB = Personal best
- SB = Season best
- N/A = Round not applicable for the event

Neeraj Chopra qualified for Budapest 23 at the Lausanne Diamond League last year when he met the entry standard of 85.20m with a throw of 89.08m. Rohit Yadav & Tajinderpal Singh Toor, both qualified athletes for this meet, will miss out due to long-term injuries of the elbow & groin respectively. High jumper Tejaswin Shankar, women's 20 km race walk athlete Priyanka Goswami & women's 800m athlete KM Chanda qualified for this meet but have opted out due to their desire to focus on the 2023 Asian Games.

Race walker Ram Baboo, meanwhile, became the first Indian athlete to qualify for the World Athletics Championships 2023 via the world ranking route earlier this year. Jyothi Yarraji, Abdulla Aboobacker and Abhishek Kumar Pal achieved berths after qualifying at their area championships in Asia. Abhishek Kumar Pal, however, did not attend the event.

This year, a remarkable total of 28 Indian athletes, including a men's relay team, have qualified for the prestigious championships, marking the highest-ever representation of Indian athletes at the event.

=== Men ===
Track and road events

Athlete	Event	Heat		Semifinal		Final	
Athlete	Event	Result	Rank	Result	Rank	Result	Rank
Krishan Kumar	800 metres	1:50.36	7	Did not advance			
Ajay Kumar Saroj	1500 metres	3:38.24 PB	13	Did not advance			
Santhosh Kumar Tamilarasan	400 metres hurdles	50.46	7	Did not advance			
Avinash Sable	3000 metres steeplechase	8:22.24	7	—		Did not advance	
Ram Baboo	35 kilometres walk	—				2:39:07	27
Akashdeep Singh	20 kilometres walk	—				1:31:12	47
Vikash Singh	20 kilometres walk	—				1:21:58	27
Paramjeet Singh Bisht	20 kilometres walk	—				1:24:02	35
Muhammed Anas; Amoj Jacob; Rajesh Ramesh; Muhammed Ajmal Variyathodi	4 × 400 metres relay	2:59.05 AR	2 Q	—		2:59.92	5

Field events

Athlete	Event	Qualification		Final	
Athlete	Event	Distance	Position	Distance	Position
Sarvesh Kushare	High jump	2.22m	20	Did not advance	
Murali Sreeshankar	Long jump	7.74m	22	Did not advance	
Jeswin Aldrin	Long jump	8.00m	12 q	7.77m	11
Praveen Chithravel	Triple jump	16.38m	20	Did not advance	
Abdulla Aboobacker	Triple jump	16.61m	15	Did not advance	
Eldhose Paul	Triple jump	15.59m	29	Did not advance	
Neeraj Chopra	Javelin throw	88.77m SB	1 Q	88.17m	1st place, gold medalist(s)
D.P. Manu	Javelin throw	81.31m	6 q	84.11m	6
Kishore Jena	Javelin throw	80.55m	9 q	84.77m PB	5

=== Women ===
Track and road events

Athlete	Event	Heat		Semifinal		Final	
Athlete	Event	Result	Rank	Result	Rank	Result	Rank
Jyothi Yarraji	100 metres hurdles	13.05	7	Did not advance			
Parul Chaudhary	3000 metres steeplechase	9:24.29 PB	5 Q	—		9.15.31 NR	11
Bhawna Jat	20 kilometres walk	—				Withdrawn due to absence at doping tests	

Field events

Athlete	Event	Qualification		Final	
Athlete	Event	Distance	Position	Distance	Position
Shaili Singh	Long jump	6.40m	24	Did not advance	
Annu Rani	Javelin throw	57.05m	19	Did not advance	
