= Nigeria at the 2019 World Athletics Championships =

Nigeria at the 2019 World Championships in Athletics
- WA code: NGR
- Website: www.athleticsnigeria.org

in Doha, Qatar
- Medals Ranked 31st: Gold 0 Silver 0 Bronze 1 Total 1

World Championships in Athletics appearances
- 1983; 1987; 1991; 1993; 1995; 1997; 1999; 2001; 2003; 2005; 2007; 2009; 2011; 2013; 2015; 2017; 2019; 2022; 2023

Nigeria competed at the 2019 World Championships in Athletics in Doha, Qatar from 27 September to 6 October 2019. The country finished in 31st place in the medal table.

== Medalists ==
| Medal | Athlete | Event | Date |
|---|---|---|---|
| Bronze | Ese Brume | Women's long jump | October 6 |

== Results ==
(q – qualified, NM – no mark, SB – season best)

=== Men ===
Track and road events

| Athlete | Event | Preliminary | | Heat | | Semi-final | | Final | |
| Athlete | Event | Result | Rank | Result | Rank | Result | Rank | Result | Rank |
|---|---|---|---|---|---|---|---|---|---|
| Raymond Ekevwo | 100 metres | — | | 10.14 | 11 Q | 10.20 | 18 | Did not advance | |
| Usheoritse Itsekiri | 100 metres | — | | 10.46 | 42 | Did not advance | | | |
| Emmanuel Arowolo | 200 metres | — | | 21.07 | 44 | Did not advance | | | |
| Divine Oduduru | 200 metres | — | | 20.40 | 19 q | 20.84 | 22 | Did not advance | |
| Edose Ibadin | 800 metres | — | | 1:47.91 | 34 | Did not advance | | | |
| Rilwan Alowonle | 400 metres hurdles | — | | 50.04 | 21 Q | 52.01 | 24 | Did not advance | |
| Enoch Adegoke; Usheoritse Itsekiri; Ogho-Oghene Egwero; Seye Ogunlewe | 4 × 100 metres relay | — | | Disqualified | | — | | Did not advance | |

Field events

| Athlete | Event | Qualification | | Final | |
| Athlete | Event | Distance | Position | Distance | Position |
|---|---|---|---|---|---|
| Chukwuebuka Enekwechi | Shot put | 20.94 | 11 Q | 21.18 | 8 |

=== Women ===
Track and road events

| Athlete | Event | Heat | | Semi-final | | Final | |
| Athlete | Event | Result | Rank | Result | Rank | Result | Rank |
|---|---|---|---|---|---|---|---|
| Blessing Okagbare | 200 metres | Disqualified | | Did not advance | | | |
| Patience Okon George | 400 metres | 51.77 | 19 q | 51.89 | 17 | Did not advance | |
| Favour Ofili | 400 metres | 51.51 PB | 13 Q | 52.58 | 21 | Did not advance | |
| Tobi Amusan | 100 metres hurdles | 12.48 PB | 1 Q | 12.48 PB | 3 Q | 12.49 | 4 |
| Joy Udo-Gabriel; Blessing Okagbare; Mercy Ntia-Obong; Rosemary Chukwuma | 4 × 100 metres relay | 43.05 SB | 10 | — | | Did not advance | |
| Blessing Oladoye; Patience Okon George; Abike Funmilola Egbeniyi; Favour Ofili | 4 × 400 metres relay | 3:35.90 | 15 | — | | Did not advance | |

Field events

| Athlete | Event | Qualification | | Final | |
| Athlete | Event | Distance | Position | Distance | Position |
|---|---|---|---|---|---|
| Ese Brume | Long jump | 6.89 | 2 Q | 6.91 | 3rd place, bronze medalist(s) |
| Oyesade Olatoye | Shot put | 16.97 | 26 | Did not advance | |
| Chioma Onyekwere | Discus throw | 61.38 PB | 13 | Did not advance | |
