= Nicaragua at the 1983 World Championships in Athletics =

- Flag of Nicaragua
- WA code: NCA

in Helsinki, Finland August 7–14, 1983
- Competitors: 3 (2 men and 1 woman) in 4 events
- Medals: Gold 0 Silver 0 Bronze 0 Total 0

World Championships in Athletics appearances
- 1983; 1987; 1991; 1993; 1995; 1997; 1999; 2001; 2003; 2005; 2007; 2009; 2011; 2013; 2015; 2017; 2019; 2022; 2023; 2025

Nicaragua competed at the 1983 World Championships in Athletics in Helsinki, Finland, which were held from 7 to 14 August 1983. The athlete delegation consisted of two athletes, middle-distance runner Luis Munguía and sprinter Marisol Garcia. They competed in the men's 800 and 1500 metres and women's 100 and 200 metres, respectively; both of them failed to make it past the qualifying heats of their entered events.

== Background ==
The 1983 World Championships in Athletics were held at the Helsinki Olympic Stadium in Helsinki, Finland. Under the auspices of the International Amateur Athletics Federation, this was the first edition of the World Championships. It was held from 7 to 14 August 1983 and had 41 different events. Among the competing teams was the nation of Nicaragua. For this edition of the World Championships in Athletics, middle-distance runner Luis Munguía and sprinter Marisol Garcia competed for the nation.

== Men ==
Ramírez first competed in the qualifying heats of the men's 800 metres on 7 August 1983 in the eighth heat against seven other competitors. There, he recorded a time of 1:55.77 and placed seventh, failing to advance further to the semifinals as only the top two of each heat and the next eight fastest athletes would only be able to do so. He then competed in the qualifying heats of the men's 1500 metres five days later in the first heat against twelve other competitors. There, he recorded a time of 4:02.06 and placed last, failing to advance to the semifinals as only the top four of each heat and the next eight fastest athletes would only be able to do so.

Track and road events

Athlete	Event	Heat		Semifinal		Final	
Athlete	Event	Result	Rank	Result	Rank	Result	Rank
Luis Munguía	800 metres	1:55.77	7	Did not advance			
Luis Munguía	1500 metres	4:02.06	13	Did not advance			

== Women ==
Garcia first competed in the qualifying heats of the women's 100 metres on 7 August 1983 fifth heat against six other competitors. There, she recorded a time of 12.99 seconds and placed last, failing to advance further as only the top three of each heat and the next eleven fastest athletes would only be able to do so. She then competed in the qualifying heats of the women's 200 metres on 12 August 1983 in the sixth heat against six other competitors. There, she recorded a time of 25.92 seconds and placed sixth, failing to advance further as only the top four of each heat and the next eight fastest athletes would only be able to do so.

Track and road events

Athlete	Event	Heat		Quarterfinal		Semifinal		Final	
Athlete	Event	Result	Rank	Result	Rank	Result	Rank	Result	Rank
Marisol Garcia	100 metres	12.99	43	Did not advance					
Marisol Garcia	200 metres	25.92	33	Did not advance					
