= Xiomara Larios =

Nicaraguan sprinter

Personal information
- Nationality: Nicaraguan
- Born: 15 November 1958 (age 66)

Sport
- Sport: Sprinting
- Event: 400 metres

Xiomara Larios (born 15 November 1958) is a Nicaraguan sprinter. She competed in the women's 400 metres at the 1980 Summer Olympics. Larios is currently president of the Nicaraguan Athletics Federation.
