= 2019 World Athletics Championships – Women's 400 metres =

Event at World Athletics Championships

Women's 400 metres at the 2019 World Championships
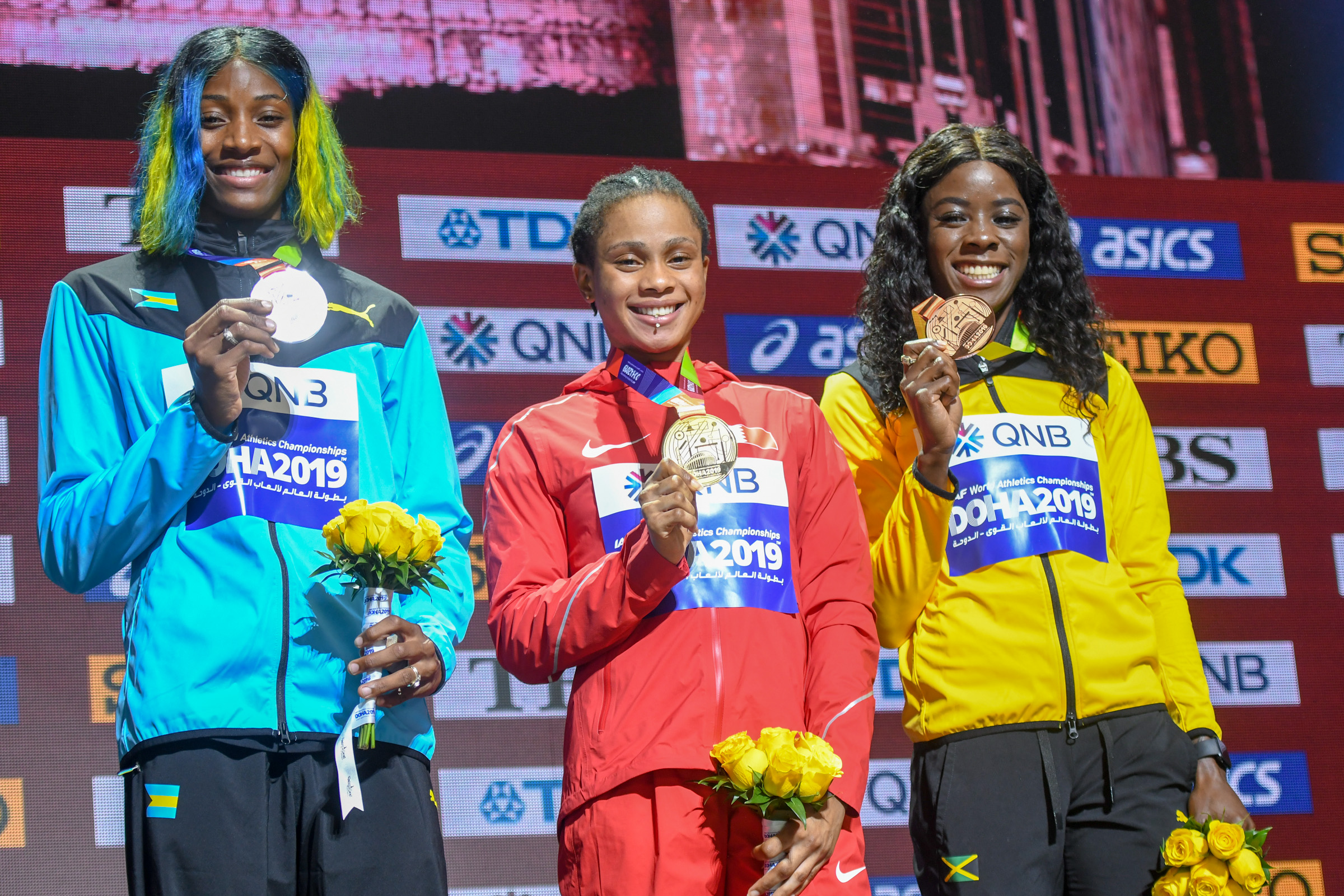
- The medal ceremony of the event.
- Venue: Khalifa International Stadium
- Dates: 30 September (heats); 1 October (semi-final); 3 October (final)
- Competitors: 48 from 32 nations
- Winning time: 48.14

Medalists
gold medal	Salwa Eid Naser	Bahrain
silver medal	Shaunae Miller-Uibo	Bahamas
bronze medal	Shericka Jackson	Jamaica

The women's 400 metres at the 2019 World Athletics Championships was held at the Khalifa International Stadium in Doha, Qatar, from 30 September to 3 October 2019.

== Summary ==
The 2019 season saw only four women break 50 seconds. World leader Shaunae Miller-Uibo did it three times. Salwa Eid Naser broke it once, coming back against a challenge from Aminatou Seyni. Naser was consistently under 51, five times during the 2019 IAAF Diamond League season. Seyni was not allowed to compete in the 400 metres because of the new IAAF testosterone rule. Shericka Jackson was the fourth to break 50 at the Jamaican championships.

Those athletes were the ones to watch in the final. With multi-toned hair, the tall Miller-Uibo started like she meant business, gaining on the stagger against defending champion Phyllis Francis to her outside and by the backstretch, Francis had already made up the stagger on Justyna Święty-Ersetic to her outside. In the center of the track, Naser had also already made up the stagger on Wadeline Jonathas to her outside. Miller-Uibo and Naser hit the 200 meter split marks virtually even. Through the final turn, Naser was moving faster, opening up 4 metres by the home straight. The first time Miller-Uibo was able to see Naser, she was already behind. That final straight is usually Miller-Uibo's territory. She began stretching out her long strides to reel Naser in. Miller-Uibo steadily gained on Naser, pulling in three metres, but it wasn't enough. Miller-Uibo set a new personal best, 48.37, which became the #6 400 metre race of all time. Naser beat her with 48.14, the #3 400 of all time. Jackson held off the American duo of Jonathas and Francis, all personal bests under 50 seconds. Like all previous top 10 women's races, there were two close competitors battling to the line.

== Records ==
Before the competition records were as follows:

Record	Perf.	Athlete	Nat.	Date	Location
World	47.60	Marita Koch	GDR	6 Oct 1985	Canberra, Australia
Championship	47.99	Jarmila Kratochvílová	TCH	10 Aug 1983	Helsinki, Finland
World Leading	49.05	Shaunae Miller-Uibo	BAH	27 Apr 2019	Gainesville, United States
African	49.10	Falilat Ogunkoya	NGA	29 Jul 1996	Atlanta, United States
Asian	49.08	Salwa Eid Naser	BHR	20 Jul 2018	Monaco
North, Central American and Caribbean	48.70	Sanya Richards-Ross	USA	16 Sep 2006	Athens, Greece
South American	49.64	Ximena Restrepo	COL	5 August 1992	Barcelona, Spain
European	47.60	Marita Koch	GDR	6 Oct 1985	Canberra, Australia
Oceanian	48.63	Cathy Freeman	AUS	29 Jul 1996	Atlanta, United States

The following records were set at the competition:

Record	Perf.	Athlete	Nat.	Date
World Leading	48.14	Salwa Eid Naser	BHR	3 Oct 2019
Asian	48.14	Salwa Eid Naser	BHR	3 Oct 2019
Bahraini	48.14	Salwa Eid Naser	BHR	3 Oct 2019
North, Central American and Caribbean	48.37	Shaunae Miller-Uibo	BAH	3 Oct 2019
Bahamian	48.37	Shaunae Miller-Uibo	BAH	3 Oct 2019

== Schedule ==
The event schedule, in local time (UTC+3), was as follows:

Date	Time	Round
30 September	18:20	Heats
1 October	20:50	Semi-finals
3 October	23:50	Final

== Results ==
=== Heats ===
The first three in each heat (Q) and the next six fastest (q) qualified for the final.

Rank	Heat	Lane	Name	Nationality	Time	Notes
1	2	3	Wadeline Jonathas	United States	50.57	Q
2	4	2	Galefele Moroko	Botswana	50.59	Q, PB
3	6	2	Salwa Eid Naser	Bahrain	50.74	Q
4	1	2	Phyllis Francis	United States	50.77	Q
5	2	8	Shericka Jackson	Jamaica	51.13	Q
6	3	9	Shakima Wimbley	United States	51.17	Q
7	2	6	Bendere Oboya	Australia	51.21	Q, PB
8	4	3	Stephenie Ann McPherson	Jamaica	51.21	Q
9	5	5	Shaunae Miller-Uibo	Bahamas	51.30	Q
10	2	7	Lisanne de Witte	Netherlands	51.31	q
11	3	8	Iga Baumgart-Witan	Poland	51.34	Q
11	6	8	Justyna Święty-Ersetic	Poland	51.34	Q
13	4	5	Favour Ofili	Nigeria	51.51	Q, PB
14	3	2	Laviai Nielsen	Great Britain & N.I.	51.52	Q
15	6	4	Paola Morán	Mexico	51.58	Q
16	2	9	Emily Diamond	Great Britain & N.I.	51.66	q, SB
17	4	7	Aliyah Abrams	Guyana	51.73	q
18	5	6	Déborah Sananes	France	51.76	Q
19	2	5	Patience Okon George	Nigeria	51.77	q
20	4	8	Kendall Ellis	United States	51.82	q
21	4	9	Roxana Gómez	Cuba	51.85	q
22	5	8	Mary Moraa	Kenya	51.85	Q
23	2	4	Eleni Artymata	Cyprus	51.90	
24	3	7	Tiffani Silva	Brazil	51.96	
25	5	2	Polina Miller	Authorised Neutral Athletes	51.96	
26	6	5	Kseniya Aksyonova	Authorised Neutral Athletes	51.99	
27	3	6	Aiyanna Stiverne	Canada	52.03	
28	1	4	Sada Williams	Barbados	52.14	Q
29	2	2	Alyona Mamina	Authorised Neutral Athletes	52.15	
30	4	6	Maggie Barrie	Sierra Leone	52.16	SB
31	3	3	Leni Shida	Uganda	52.22	
32	1	3	Lada Vondrová	Czech Republic	52.23	Q
33	6	3	Madeline Price	Canada	52.24	
34	5	4	Anna Kiełbasińska	Poland	52.25	
35	5	7	Anastasia Le-Roy	Jamaica	52.26	
36	5	9	Irini Vasiliou	Greece	52.31	
37	6	7	Anjali Devi	India	52.33	
38	3	5	Maria Benedicta Chigbolu	Italy	52.63	
39	1	7	Anita Horvat	Slovenia	52.73	
40	1	6	Cátia Azevedo	Portugal	52.79	
41	6	6	Amandine Brossier	France	52.81	
42	1	8	Christine Botlogetswe	Botswana	53.27	
43	3	4	Janet Richard	Malta	54.33	
44	4	4	Gabriella O'Grady	Australia	54.99	
45	1	5	Hellen Syombua	Kenya	57.07	
46	6	9	Aishath Himna Hassan	Maldives	59.91	
47	5	3	Kenza Sosse	Qatar	1:06.76	
	1	9	Ingrid Yahoska Narvaez	Nicaragua	DQ	163.3(a)

=== Semi-finals ===
Video on YouTube Official Video

The first two in each heat (Q) and the next two fastest (q) qualified for the final.

Rank	Heat	Lane	Name	Nationality	Time	Notes
1	2	6	Shaunae Miller-Uibo	Bahamas	49.66	Q
2	1	7	Salwa Eid Naser	Bahrain	49.79	Q
3	2	4	Wadeline Jonathas	United States	50.07	Q, PB
4	2	7	Shericka Jackson	Jamaica	50.10	q
5	1	5	Phyllis Francis	United States	50.22	Q, SB
6	3	6	Stephenie Ann McPherson	Jamaica	50.70	Q, SB
7	3	5	Justyna Święty-Ersetic	Poland	50.96	Q
8	1	6	Iga Baumgart-Witan	Poland	51.02	q, PB
9	1	8	Paola Morán	Mexico	51.08	
10	2	5	Sada Williams	Barbados	51.31	PB
11	2	2	Lisanne de Witte	Netherlands	51.41	
12	2	3	Roxana Gómez	Cuba	51.56	SB
13	2	9	Bendere Oboya	Australia	51.58	
14	3	3	Kendall Ellis	United States	51.58	
15	3	2	Emily Diamond	Great Britain & N.I.	51.62	SB
16	1	3	Aliyah Abrams	Guyana	51.71	
17	1	2	Patience Okon George	Nigeria	51.89	
18	3	9	Mary Moraa	Kenya	52.11	
19	1	4	Déborah Sananes	France	52.24	
20	2	8	Lada Vondrová	Czech Republic	52.25	
21	3	8	Favour Ofili	Nigeria	52.58	
22	1	9	Laviai Nielsen	Great Britain & N.I.	52.94	
23	3	7	Shakima Wimbley	United States	1:13.55	
	3	4	Galefele Moroko	Botswana	DNF	

=== Final ===
The final was started on 3 October at 23:50.

Rank	Lane	Name	Nationality	Time	Notes
1st place, gold medalist(s)	5	Salwa Eid Naser	Bahrain	48.14	AR, WL
2nd place, silver medalist(s)	7	Shaunae Miller-Uibo	Bahamas	48.37	AR
3rd place, bronze medalist(s)	3	Shericka Jackson	Jamaica	49.47	PB
4	6	Wadeline Jonathas	United States	49.60	PB
5	8	Phyllis Francis	United States	49.61	PB
6	4	Stephenie Ann McPherson	Jamaica	50.89	
7	9	Justyna Święty-Ersetic	Poland	50.95	
8	2	Iga Baumgart-Witan	Poland	51.29	
