= India at the 2015 World Championships in Athletics =

- WA code: IND
- National federation: Athletics Federation of India

in China
- Competitors: 16 in 9 events
- Medals: Gold 0 Silver 0 Bronze 0 Total 0

World Championships in Athletics appearances
- 1983; 1987; 1991; 1993; 1995; 1997; 1999; 2001; 2003; 2005; 2007; 2009; 2011; 2013; 2015; 2017; 2019; 2022; 2023

India competed at the 2015 World Championships in Athletics from August 22 to August 30 in China, Beijing.

== Results ==
(q – qualified, NM – no mark, SB – season best)

=== Men ===
Track and road events

Athlete	Event	Heat		Semifinal		Final	
Athlete	Event	Result	Rank	Result	Rank	Result	Rank
Gurmeet Singh	20 kilometres walk	—				1:25:22	35
Baljinder Singh	20 kilometres walk	—				DNF	
Chandan Singh	20 kilometres walk	—				1:26:40	41
Sandeep Kumar	50 kilometres walk	—				3:57:03 SB	26
Manish Singh	50 kilometres walk	—				3:57:11 PB	27

Field events

Athlete	Event	Qualification		Final	
Athlete	Event	Result	Rank	Result	Rank
Inderjeet Singh	Shot put	20.47m	8 q	19.52m	11
Vikas Gowda	Discus throw	63.86m	7 q	62.24m	9

=== Women ===
Track and road events

Athlete	Event	Heat		Semifinal		Final	
Athlete	Event	Result	Rank	Result	Rank	Result	Rank
Tintu Lukka	800 metres	2:00.95 SB	7	Did not advance			
O. P. Jaisha	Marathon	—				2:34:43 NR	18
Sudha Singh	Marathon	—				2:35:35 PB	19
Lalita Babar	Marathon	—				Did not start	
Lalita Babar	3000 metres steeplechase	9:27.86 NR	4 q	—		9:29.64	8
Sapana	20 kilometres walk	—				DQ	
Khushbir Kaur	20 kilometres walk	—				1:38:53	37
Jisna Mathew; Tintu Lukka; Debasree Majumdar; M. R. Poovamma	4 × 400 metres relay	3:29.08 SB	8	—		Did not advance	
