= India at the 1983 World Championships in Athletics =

India at the 1983 World Athletics Championships
- Flag of India
- WA code: IND
- National federation: Athletics Federation of India
- Website: https://indianathletics.in

in Helsinki, Finland 7–14 August 1983
- Competitors: 2 (1 man and 1 woman) in 2 events
- Medals: Gold 0 Silver 0 Bronze 0 Total 0

World Athletics Championships appearances (overview)
- 1983; 1987; 1991; 1993; 1995; 1997; 1999; 2001; 2003; 2005; 2007; 2009; 2011; 2013; 2015; 2017; 2019; 2022; 2023

India competed at the 1983 World Athletics Championships in Helsinki, Finland from 7 to 14 August 1983.

== Results ==
Key

- Q = Qualified for the next round
- q = Qualified for the next round as a fastest loser or, in field events, by position without achieving the qualifying target
- NR = National record
- PB = Personal best
- SB = Season best
- NM = No Mark (Failed to register any distance)
- N/A = Round not applicable for the event

=== Men ===
Track and Road events

Athlete	Event	Final	
Athlete	Event	Result	Rank
Siri Chand Ram	20km Race Walk	1:31:32	42

=== Women ===
Field events

Athlete	Event	Qualification		Final	
Athlete	Event	Distance	Position	Distance	Position
Mercy Kuttan	Long Jump	NM	—	Did not advance	
