= India at the 1987 World Indoor Championships in Athletics =

India at the 1987 IAAF World Indoor Championships
- Flag of India
- WA code: IND
- National federation: Athletics Federation of India
- Website: https://indianathletics.in

in Indianapolis, US 6–8 March 1987
- Competitors: 1 (0 men and 1 woman) in 1 event
- Medals: Gold 0 Silver 0 Bronze 0 Total 0

World Indoor Championships in Athletics appearances
- 1985; 1987; 1989; 1991; 1993; 1995; 1997; 1999; 2001; 2003; 2004; 2006; 2008; 2010; 2012; 2014; 2016; 2018; 2022; 2024

India competed at the 1987 IAAF World Indoor Championships in Indianapolis, US from 6th to 8th March 1987.

== Results ==
Key

- Q = Qualified for the next round
- q = Qualified for the next round as a fastest loser or, in field events, by position without achieving the qualifying target
- NR = National record
- PB = Personal best
- SB = Season best
- NM = No Mark (Failed to register any distance)
- N/A = Round not applicable for the event

=== Women ===
Track and Road events

Athlete	Event	Heats		Final	
Athlete	Event	Result	Rank	Result	Rank
Geeta Zutshi	800m	2:10.79	17	—N/a	Did not advance
