= India at the 2018 World Indoor Championships in Athletics =

India at the 2018 IAAF World Indoor Championships
- Flag of India
- WA code: IND
- National federation: Athletics Federation of India
- Website: https://indianathletics.in

in Birmingham, UK 1–4 March 2018
- Competitors: 1 (1 man and 0 women) in 1 event
- Medals: Gold 0 Silver 0 Bronze 0 Total 0

World Indoor Championships in Athletics appearances
- 1985; 1987; 1989; 1991; 1993; 1995; 1997; 1999; 2001; 2003; 2004; 2006; 2008; 2010; 2012; 2014; 2016; 2018; 2022; 2024

India competed at the 2018 IAAF World Indoor Championships in Birmingham, UK from 1st to 4th March 2018.

== Results ==
Key

- Q = Qualified for the next round
- q = Qualified for the next round as a fastest loser or, in field events, by position without achieving the qualifying target
- NR = National record
- PB = Personal best
- SB = Season best
- NM = No Mark (Failed to register any distance)
- N/A = Round not applicable for the event

=== Men ===
Track and Road events

Athlete	Event	Heats		Final	
Athlete	Event	Result	Rank	Result	Rank
Siddhanth Thingalaya	60mH	7.62	31	—	Did not advance
