= 2025 Asian Athletics Championships – Women's 1500 metres =

Women's 1500 metres at the 2025 Asian Athletics Championships
- Venue: Gumi Civic Stadium
- Location: Gumi, South Korea
- Dates: 28 May
- Competitors: 13 from 9 nations
- Winning time: 4:10.58

Medalists
gold medal	Li Chunhui	China
silver medal	Pooja Olla	India
bronze medal	Tomoka Kimura	Japan

The women's 1500 metres event at the 2025 Asian Athletics Championships was held on 28 May.

== Records ==
Records before the 2025 Asian Athletics Championships
Record	Athlete (nation)	Time (s)	Location	Date
World record	Faith Kipyegon (KEN)	3:49.11	Florence, Italy	2 June 2023
Asian record	Qu Yunxia (CHN)	3:50.46	Beijing, China	11 September 1993
Championship record	Nozomi Tanaka (JPN)	4:06.75	Bangkok, Thailand	17 July 2023
World leading	Gudaf Tsegay (ETH)	3:53.92	Toruń, Poland	16 February 2025
Asian leading	Nelly Jepkosgei (BHR)	4:04.01	Rabat, Morocco	25 May 2025

== Schedule ==
The event schedule, in local time (UTC+9), was as follows:

Date	Time	Round
28 May	18:10	Final

== Results ==
Place	Athlete	Nation	Time	Notes
1st place, gold medalist(s)	Li Chunhui	China	4:10.58	
2nd place, silver medalist(s)	Pooja Olla	India	4:10.83	
3rd place, bronze medalist(s)	Tomoka Kimura	Japan	4:11.56	SB
4	Lili Das	India	4:13.81	
5	Park Na-yeon	South Korea	4:15.64	PB
6	Yume Goto	Japan	4:16.52	SB
7	Nguyễn Thị Oanh	Vietnam	4:20.02	
8	Layla Al-Masri	Palestine	4:21.20	
9	Kim Yu-jin	South Korea	4:24.18	
10	Song Da-won	South Korea	4:34.95	
11	Phulmati Rana	Nepal	4:43.51	
12	Ayana Bolatbekkyzy	Kazakhstan	4:44.09	
13	Amal Al-Roumi	Kuwait	4:47.31	
