= India at the 1985 World Indoor Championships in Athletics =

India at the 1985 IAAF World Indoor Games
- Flag of India
- WA code: IND
- National federation: Athletics Federation of India
- Website: https://indianathletics.in

in Paris, France 18–19 January 1985
- Competitors: 2 (1 man and 1 woman) in 2 events
- Medals: Gold 0 Silver 0 Bronze 0 Total 0

World Indoor Championships in Athletics appearances
- 1985; 1987; 1989; 1991; 1993; 1995; 1997; 1999; 2001; 2003; 2004; 2006; 2008; 2010; 2012; 2014; 2016; 2018; 2022; 2024

India competed at the 1985 IAAF World Indoor Games in Paris, France from 18 to 19 January 1985.

== Results ==
Key

- Q = Qualified for the next round
- q = Qualified for the next round as a fastest loser or, in field events, by position without achieving the qualifying target
- NR = National record
- PB = Personal best
- SB = Season best
- NM = No Mark (Failed to register any distance)
- N/A = Round not applicable for the event

=== Men ===
Field events

Athlete	Event	Final	
Athlete	Event	Distance	Position
Nalluswamy Annavi	High Jump	2.05m NR	18

=== Women ===
Track and Road events

Athlete	Event	Final	
Athlete	Event	Result	Rank
Shiny Abraham	800m	2:08.09 NR	5
