= India at the 2022 World Indoor Championships in Athletics =

India at the 2022 World Athletics Indoor Championships
- Flag of India
- WA code: IND
- National federation: Athletics Federation of India
- Website: https://indianathletics.in

in Belgrade, Serbia 18–20 March 2022
- Competitors: 3 (2 men and 1 woman) in 3 events
- Medals: Gold 0 Silver 0 Bronze 0 Total 0

World Indoor Championships in Athletics appearances
- 1985; 1987; 1989; 1991; 1993; 1995; 1997; 1999; 2001; 2003; 2004; 2006; 2008; 2010; 2012; 2014; 2016; 2018; 2022; 2024

India competed at the 2022 World Athletics Indoor Championships in Belgrade, Serbia from 18th to 20th March 2022.

== Results ==
Key

- Q = Qualified for the next round
- q = Qualified for the next round as a fastest loser or, in field events, by position without achieving the qualifying target
- NR = National record
- PB = Personal best
- SB = Season best
- NM = No Mark (Failed to register any distance)
- N/A = Round not applicable for the event

=== Men ===
Field events

Athlete	Event	Final	
Athlete	Event	Distance	Position
Murali Sreeshankar	Long Jump	7.92m NR	7
Tajinderpal Singh Toor	Shot Put	NM	—

=== Women ===
Track and Road events

Athlete	Event	Heats		Final	
Athlete	Event	Result	Rank	Result	Rank
Dutee Chand	60m	7.35	30	—	Did not advance
