= Nicaragua at the 2022 World Athletics Championships =

- Flag of Nicaragua
- WA code: NCA

in Eugene, United States 15 July 2022 – 24 July 2022
- Competitors: 1 (1 man)
- Medals: Gold 0 Silver 0 Bronze 0 Total 0

World Athletics Championships appearances
- 1983; 1987; 1991; 1993; 1995; 1997; 1999; 2001; 2003; 2005; 2007; 2009; 2011; 2013; 2015; 2017; 2019; 2022; 2023; 2025

Nicaragua competed at the 2022 World Athletics Championships in Eugene, Oregon, United States, which were held from 15 to 24 July 2022. The athlete delegation of the country was composed of one competitor, sprinter Dexter Mayorga. He competed in the men's 400 metres and failed to make it past the qualifying heats.

== Background ==
The 2022 World Athletics Championships in Eugene, Oregon, United States, were held from 15 to 24 July 2022. To qualify for the World Championships, athletes had to reach an entry standard (e.g. time and distance), place in a specific position at select competitions, be a wild card entry, or qualify through their World Athletics Ranking at the end of the qualification period.

As the Nicaragua did not meet any of the four standards, they could send either one male or one female athlete in one event of the Championships who has not yet qualified. The Nicaraguan Athletics Federation selected sprinter Dexter Mayorga who held a personal and season's best of 48.02 seconds in the men's 400 metres set at the 2022 Central American Championships in Athletics, his entered event. In the lead-up to the World Championships, he was unranked in the World Athletics Rankings.

== Results ==
=== Men ===
Mayorga competed in the qualifying heats of the men's 400 metres on 17 July 2022 in the fifth heat against six other competitors. There, he recorded a time of 48.40 seconds and placed last, failing to advance further to the semifinals as only the top three of each heat and the next six fastest athletes would only be able to do so.

Track and road events

Athlete	Event	Heat		Semi-final		Final	
Athlete	Event	Result	Rank	Result	Rank	Result	Rank
Dexter Mayorga	400 metres	48.40	39	Did not advance			
