= India at the 2009 World Championships in Athletics =

- WA code: IND
- National federation: Athletics Federation of India
- Website: indianathletics.org

in Berlin
- Competitors: 6 (3 men and 3 women) in 5 events
- Medals: Gold 0 Silver 0 Bronze 0 Total 0

World Championships in Athletics appearances
- 1983; 1987; 1991; 1993; 1995; 1997; 1999; 2001; 2003; 2005; 2007; 2009; 2011; 2013; 2015; 2017; 2019; 2022; 2023

India' participated in the 2009 World Championships in Athletics held at Berlin from 15–23 August. Six Indian athletes had qualified for the Championships, but none of them won any medal. Only Babubhai Panucha, who competed in the 20 km walk category managed to establish a new National record clocking a time of 1:23:06 beating his own previous record time.

Athletics Federation of India had sent a team of six athletes for the competition, which is ranked only next to the Olympics and the FIFA World Cup in terms of popularity as a major global sporting event. Selected athletes have achieved one of the competition's qualifying standards.

== Results ==
=== Men ===
Event	Athlete	Heat		Semifinal		Final	
Event	Athlete	Result	Rank	Result	Rank	Result	Rank
10,000 m	Surendra Kumar Singh	—				28:35.51 SB	19 (out of 31)
400 m hurdles	Joseph Abraham	DQ	Did not advance				
20 km walk	Babubhai Panucha	—				1:23:06 NR	20 (out of 50)

=== Women ===
Event	Athletes	Qualification		Final	
Event	Athletes	Result	Rank	Result	Rank
Discus throw	Krishna Poonia	56.75m	28	Did not Qualify	
Discus throw	Seema Antil	59.85m	15	Did not Qualify	
Heptathlon	Susmita Singha Roy			4,983	26 (out of 29)
