= Anjali Devi (athlete) =

Indian sprinter

Personal information
- Nationality: Indian
- Born: 15 September 1998 (age 27)

Sport
- Country: India
- Sport: Athletics
- Event: Sprinting

Achievements and titles
- Personal best(s): 400 m – 51.53 (2019)

Anjali Devi (born 15 September 1998) is an Indian athlete. She competed in the women's 400 metres event at the 2019 World Athletics Championships. She did not advance to compete in the semi-finals.

In 2024, Devi was issued with a four-year ban backdated to June 2023 by the Indian National Anti-Doping Agency for an anti-doping rule violation after testing positive for GW1516.
