= St. Nicholas' Church, Puthiyathura =

Church in Thiruvananthapuram, India

Coordinates: 8.33806767954335°N 77.05035918232018°E

St. Nicholas' Church, Puthiyathura is a catholic church in the parish of Puthiyathura in the Latin Archdiocese of Trivandrum.
