= Nicaragua at the 2015 World Championships in Athletics =

- WA code: NCA

in Beijing
- Competitors: 1
- Medals: Gold 0 Silver 0 Bronze 0 Total 0

World Championships in Athletics appearances
- 1983; 1987; 1991; 1993; 1995; 1997; 1999; 2001; 2003; 2005; 2007; 2009; 2011; 2013; 2015; 2017; 2019; 2022; 2023

Nicaragua competed at the 2015 World Championships in Athletics in Beijing, China, from 22 to 30 August 2015.

== Men ==
Track and road events

Athlete	Event	Heat		Semifinal		Final	
Athlete	Event	Result	Rank	Result	Rank	Result	Rank
Eric Rodriguez	1500 metres	3:49.64 NR	39	did not advance			
