= Alex Antony =

Indian athlete (born 1994)

Personal information
- Nationality: Indian
- Born: 3 September 1994 (age 31) Pulluvila, Trivandrum, Kerala, India

Sport
- Sport: Track and field

Alex Antony is an Indian athlete who represented India at the 2020 Summer Olympics.

== Early life and education ==
Alex was born to a fisherman family and currently lives in Thiruvananthapuram. He alongside his younger brother Anil often ventured into the high seas to assist his father. Alex studied at a local government school at Kanjiramkulam. In 2013, he received gold at the junior nationals and at the Inter-varsity athletic meet.

Alex was one of the 26-member Indian contingent selected for the Tokyo Olympics 2020, which was later postponed to 23 July to 8 August 2021, due to the COVID-19 pandemic.
