= Li Chunhui =

Chinese athlete (born 2001)

Personal information
- Nationality: Chinese
- Born: 29 March 2001 (age 25)

Sport
- Sport: Athletics
- Event: Middle-distance running

Achievements and titles
- Personal bests: 800 m: 2:05.15 (2025); 1500 m: 4:06.28 (2025); 3000 m: 9:31.88 (2025); Half marathon: 1:11:04 (2026)
Medal record
Women's athletics
Representing China
Asian Games
Silver medal – second place	2026 Aichi–Nagoya	1500 m
Asian Championships
Gold medal – first place	2025 Gumi	1500 m
Asian Indoor Championships
Silver medal – second place	2026 Tianjin	1500 m

Li Chunhui (born 29 March 2001) is a Chinese middle-distance runner. She won the gold medal over 1500 metres at the 2025 Asian Championships and the silver medal at the 2026 Asian Indoor Athletics Championships and 2026 Asian Games.

== Biography ==
In Gumi, South Korea in May 2025, she won the gold medal at the 2025 Asian Athletics Championships in the women's 1500 metres, running 4:10.58. She also placed fifth over 800 metres at the Championships. She won the women's 1500 m at China's 15th National Games in Guangzhou in November 2025. She also placed second over 800 metres at the Games.

In February 2026, she won the silver medal behind Nozomi Tanaka of Japan but ahead of Norah Jeruto of Kazhakstan in the 1500 metres at the 2026 Asian Indoor Athletics Championships in Tianjin. In September, she won the silver medal in the 1500 metres at the 2026 Asian Games in Nagoya.
