= Association of Indonesia Futsal Academy =

Governing body of futsal in Indonesia

- Formation: 10 March 2013
- Type: Sports organization
- Headquarters: Jakarta, Indonesia

The Association of Indonesia Futsal Academy, commonly called AAFI (Indonesian: Asosiasi Akademi Futsal Indonesia) is the sole, independent body directly representing youth futsal at Indonesia level. AAFI exists to protect and promote Indonesian youth futsal. Its aim is to create a new, more democratic governance model that truly reflects the key role of youth development in futsal.

== History ==
At the date of March 10, 2013 the association was officially formed as a place for youth futsal player in Indonesia. The Association aims to develop futsal sport since the age of six to sixteen years with regular competitions held annually.

== Structure ==
The AAFI Executive Board currently stands as such:

Board of Advisors

- Taufik Jursal Effendi

Head of Organization and Financial Affairs

- Ikhlas Bahar
- Arif Isnawan

Head of Marketing and Public Relations

- Ferdiansyah

Head of Development of Achievement and Competition

- Sayan Karmadi
- Wahyu Tri

Head of Information, Communications and Research Development

- David D. Nanulaita

== AAFI Tournament ==
AAFI covering certain tournament in the inaugural edition in 2013, just compare the two age categories is the category under-13 years of age and under-16 years of age.

=== Under-13 ===
Season	Champion	Score	Runner-up	Ref
2013	Hattrick FC	3 - 1	Picessa School Futsal	

=== Under-16 ===
Season	Champion	Score	Runner-up	Ref
2013	Enrico Futsal Academy	1 - 1 (4 - 3, p.s.o.)	Futsal	
