= Indian National Open Athletics Championships =

Annual track and field competition

- Sport: Track and field
- Founded: 1961
- Country: India
- Related competitions: Indian Inter State Senior Athletics Championships

The Indian National Open Athletics Championships (Hindi: ओपन नेशनल एथलेटिक चैम्पियनशिप) is an annual outdoor track and field competition organised by the Athletics Federation of India, which serves as the national championship for the sport in India. First held in 1961, it is one of four major national events in track and field, alongside the annual Indian Inter State Senior Athletics Championships and Federation Cup Senior Athletics Championships, as well as the biennial National Games of India.

The 1994 edition featured foreign athletes who were invited as part of celebrations of the opening of the Jawaharlal Nehru Stadium in Chennai. The venue for the championships changes each year, and it is typically held over four days in the period from August to October.

== Events ==
The competition programme features a total of 38 individual Indian Championship athletics events, 19 for men and 19 for women. For each division, there are seven track running events, three obstacle events, four jumps, four throws, and one combined event. Separate annual championship events are held for cross country running, the marathon and road racewalking events.

Track running

- 100 metres, 200 metres, 400 metres, 800 metres, 1500 metres, 5000 metres, 10,000 metres

Obstacle events

- 100 metres hurdles (women only), 110 metres hurdles (men only), 400 metres hurdles, 3000 metres steeplechase

Jumping events

- Pole vault, high jump, long jump, triple jump

Throwing events

- Shot put, discus throw, javelin throw, hammer throw

Combined events

- Decathlon (men only), heptathlon (women only)

The women's programme was limited initially, though has since expanded to match the men's events. The women's 3000 metres was amended to the 5000 m in 1995 to match the men's distance. Women's triple jump and hammer throw were added in 1995, followed by the pole vault in 1999, and finally the women's 3000 m steeplechase in 2003.

== Editions ==
| Edition | Year | Date | Venue | City | State |
|---|---|---|---|---|---|
| 57th | 2018 | 25–28 October | Kalinga Stadium | Bhubaneswar | Odisha |
| 58th | 2019 | 10–13 October | Birsa Munda Athletics Stadium | Ranchi | Jharkhand |
| 59th | 2020 | 16–19 August | Jawaharlal Nehru Stadium | Chennai | Tamil Nadu |
| 60th | 2021 | 15–19 September | J.N. Stadium | Hanamkonda | Warangal |
| 61st | 2022 | 15–19 October | Sree Kanteerava Stadium | Bengaluru | Karnataka |
| 62nd | 2023 | 11–15 October | Sree Kanteerava Stadium | Bengaluru | Karnataka |
| 63rd | 2024 | 30 August–2 September | Sree Kanteerava Stadium | Bengaluru | Karnataka |
| 64th | 2025 | 27–30 October | Birsa Munda Athletics Stadium | Ranchi | Jharkhand |
| 65th | 2026 | 8–11 October | | New Delhi | Delhi |

== Championships records ==
=== Men ===
| Event | Record | Athlete/Team | Date | Place | Ref. |
|---|---|---|---|---|---|
| 100 m | 10.23 (+1.6 m/s) | Manikanta Hoblidhar | 11 October 2023 | Bengaluru | |
| 200 m | | | | | |
| Pole vault | | | | | |

=== Women ===
| Event | Record | Athlete/Team | Date | Place | Ref. |
|---|---|---|---|---|---|
| 100 m | | | | | |
| 200 m | | | | | |
| 1500 m | 4:05.39 | Harmilan Kaur Bains | 16 September 2021 | Warangal | |
| Pole vault | 4.21 m | Rosy Meena Paulraj | 15 October 2022 | Bengaluru | |
| Discus throw | | | | | |
| Hammer throw | | | | | |
| Javelin throw | | | | | |
