= Noah Nirmal Tom =

Indian sprinter

Junior Warrant Officer Noah Nirmal Tom
Personal information
- Nationality: Indian
- Born: 13 November 1994 (age 31) Perambra, Kozhikode, India
- Military career
- Allegiance: India
- Branch: Indian Air Force
- Rank: Junior Warrant Officer

Sport
- Sport: Athletics
- Event: Sprinting

Junior Warrant Officer (JWO) Noah Nirmal Tom (born 13 November 1994) is an Indian athlete and a Junior-Commissioned Officer (JCO) in the Indian Air Force. He is from Chakkittapara of Kozhikode district in Kerala state. He competed in the mixed 4 × 400 metres relay event at the 2019 World Athletics Championships, and 2020 Tokyo Olympics which were held on 2021. Noah studied at Silver Hills School, where his teacher Jose Sebastian first recognised his talent.
