= India at the 2011 World Championships in Athletics =

- WA code: IND

in Daegu
- Competitors: 8 (5 men and 3 women) in 8 events
- Medals: Gold 0 Silver 0 Bronze 0 Total 0

World Championships in Athletics appearances
- 1983; 1987; 1991; 1993; 1995; 1997; 1999; 2001; 2003; 2005; 2007; 2009; 2011; 2013; 2015; 2017; 2019; 2022; 2023

India competed at the 2011 World Championships in Athletics from August 27 to September 4 in Daegu, South Korea. A team of 8 athletes was announced to represent the country in the event.

Tintu Luka reached the semifinal of the 800m race in which she came 6th and could not qualify for the final but she managed to clock her season's best timing and qualified for the 2012 London olympics. Vikas Gowda managed to hurl the discus to 64.05m giving him 7th place in the overall discus throw competition. Mayookha Johny reached the final of the long jump event.

== Results ==
(q - qualified, NM - no mark, SB - season best)

=== Men ===
| Athlete | Event | Preliminaries | | Heats | | Semifinals | | Final | |
| Athlete | Event | Time Width Height | Rank | Time Width Height | Rank | Time Width Height | Rank | Time Width Height | Rank |
|---|---|---|---|---|---|---|---|---|---|
| Renjith Maheshwary | Triple jump | NM | | | | | | did not advance | |
| Om Prakash Singh | Shot put | 19.29m | 23 | | | | | did not advance | |
| Vikas Gowda | Discus throw | 63.99m | 8 q | | | | | 64.05m | 7 |
| Gurmeet Singh | 20 kilometres walk | | | | | | | 1:26.34 | 30 |
| Babubhai Panocha | 20 kilometres walk | | | | | | | 1:26.53 | 31 |

=== Women ===
| Athlete | Event | Preliminaries | | Heats | | Semifinals | | Final | |
| Athlete | Event | Time Width Height | Rank | Time Width Height | Rank | Time Width Height | Rank | Time Width Height | Rank |
|---|---|---|---|---|---|---|---|---|---|
| Tintu Luka | 800m | | | 2:01.89 | 6 q | 2:00.95 | 5 SB | did not advance | |
| Mayookha Johny | Long jump | 6.53m | 10 q | | | | | 6.37m | 9 |
| Mayookha Johny | Triple jump | 13.99m | 19 | | | | | did not advance | |
| Harwant Kaur | Discus throw | 56.49m | 21 | | | | | did not advance | |
