= Pooja Olla =

Indian middle-distance runner (born 2002)

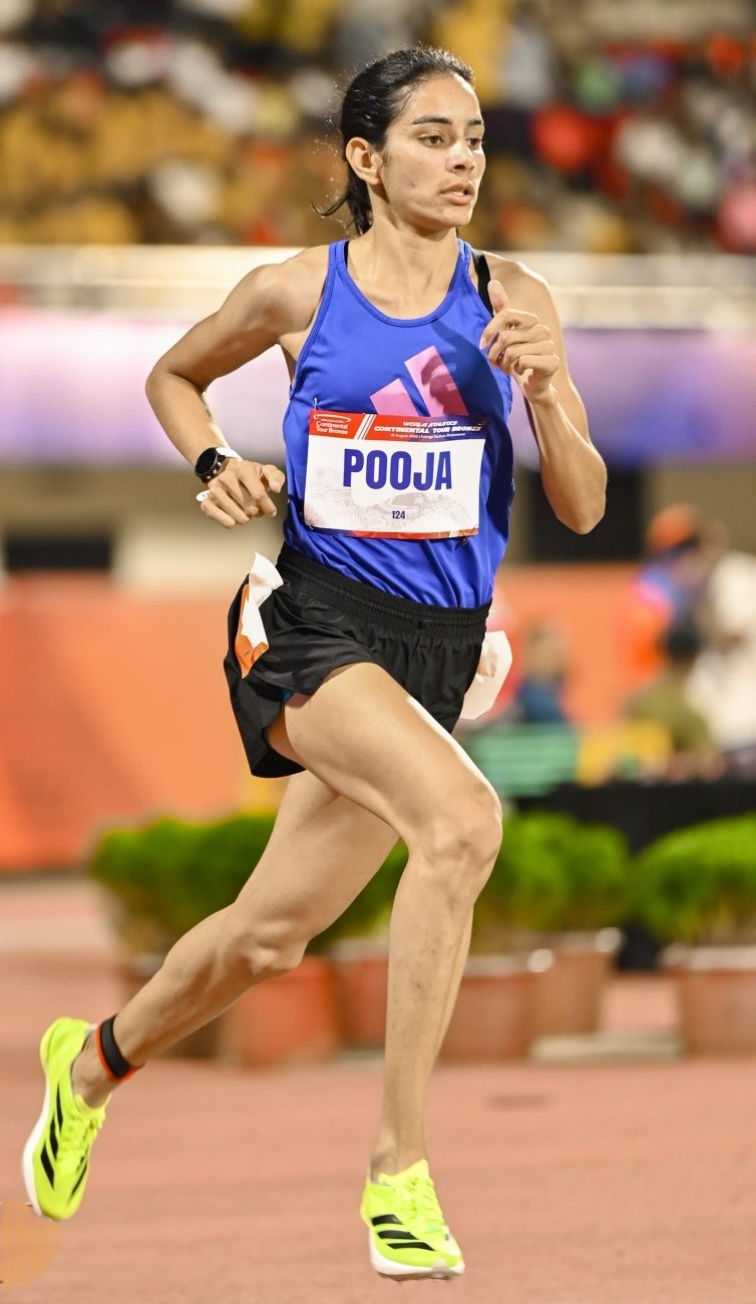
- Olla in 2025

Personal information
- Nationality: Indian
- Born: 17 June 2002 (age 24) Fatehabad, Haryana, India
- Employer: Indian Railways

Sport
- Sport: Track and field
- Events: 800 m, 1500 m

Achievements and titles
- Personal bests: 800 m: 2:01.03 (2025); 1500 m: 4:09.52 (2023)
Medal record
Women's athletics
Representing India
Asian Championships
Silver medal – second place	2025 Gumi	1500m
Bronze medal – third place	2025 Gumi	800m

Pooja Olla (born 17 June 2002) is an Indian middle-distance runner who competes in the 800 m and 1500 m.

== Early life ==
Olla was born on 17 June 2002 in Fatehabad, Haryana. She initially took up hockey during her youth, but at around age 15, while training at the Sports Authority of India centre in Badal, Punjab, a coach recognized her potential for running and encouraged her to switch to athletics, focusing on middle-distance events. She works as a ticket collector-cum-commercial clerk at the Bilaspur Railway Division in Chhattisgarh.

== Career ==
Olla competed in national competitions including the National School Games, Khelo India Youth Games and the Federation Cup before progressing to senior-level athletics.

At the 2025 Asian Athletics Championships, Olla won the silver medal in the 1500 m event with a time of 4:10.83 and the bronze medal in the 800 m event, setting a personal best of 2:01.89 in the latter event.

The following week she won gold medals in both the 800 m and 1500 m at the 2025 Taiwan Open Athletics Meet; she set a meet record of 2:02.79 in the 800 m and recorded 4:11.63 in the 1500 m. Later in 2025, representing South East Central Railway, Olla won the 1500 metres gold medal at the World Continental Bronze Athletic Meet held in Bhubaneswar. At the 64th National Inter-State Athletics Championships 2025 in Chennai, Olla won gold in the women's 800 m with a time of 2:02.27, she also clinched the 1500 m gold medal, clocking 4:10.68.
