= K. T. Irfan =

Indian racewalker (born 1990)

Naib Subedar Irfan Kolothum Thodi
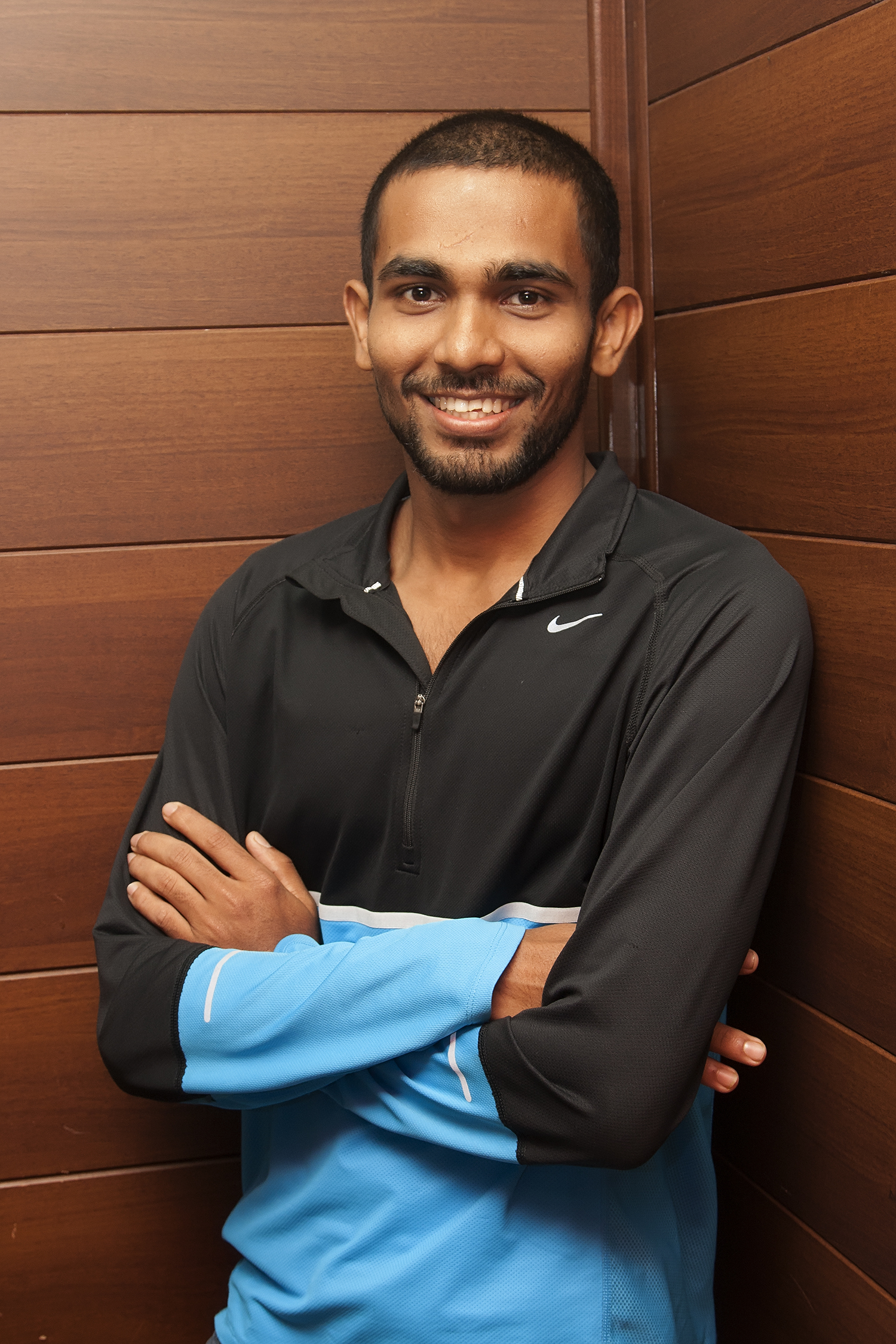

Personal information
- Full name: Irfan Kolothum Thodi
- Nationality: Indian
- Born: 8 February 1990 (age 36) Malappuram, Kerala, India
- Weight: 65 kg (143 lb)
- Military career
- Allegiance: India
- Branch: Indian Army
- Rank: Naib Subedar

Sport
- Country: India
- Sport: Athletics
- Event: Racewalking

Achievements and titles
- Personal bests: 10 km: 40:10 (London 2012); 20 km: 1:20:21 NR (London 2012)

Naib subedar Irfan Kolothum Thodi (born 8 February 1990) is an Indian athlete and Indian Army junior Commissioned Officer (JCO) from Malappuram, Kerala.

Irfan had competed in the Federation Cup at Patiala, clocking a personal best of 1:2:09 in 2012. At the London 2012 Olympics, he set the Indian national record in the 20 km walk with a timing of 1:20:21 and ranked 10th. This was also the first time, since Zora Singh's 8th position finish in Roma 1960, that any of the Indian track and field athletes had finished in the top 10 at the Olympics. He did not participate in the 2016 Rio Olympics though he had qualified, owing to a stress fracture.In Tokyo Olympics 2020, he finished a disappointing 51st with a timing of 1:34:41.

In March 2013, Irfan finished 5th in the IAAF World 20 km Race Walking Challenge event held at Taicang, China.

KT Irfan qualified for Tokyo Olympics in the race walking event of athletics after finishing fourth in the 20 km event at the Asian Race Walking Championships in Nomi, Japan. KT Irfan was the first Indian from athletics to book a spot in the Tokyo Olympics. He finished 51st in the event.

== Achievements ==
- 2011-Inter State Senior National Athletic Championship-Silver-01:30:31
- 2011-Open National Athletic Championship-Gold-01:27:46
- 2012-Federation Cup Senior Athletic Championship-Gold-01:22:14 (new meet record)
- 2012-World Race Walking Cup-19th-01:22:09 (Qualified for London Olympics)
- 2012-London Olympics-10th-01:20:21 (New National Record)
- 2013-IAAF World Race Walking Challenge-5th-01:20:59
- 2013-Participated in the World Athletics Championships, Moscow
- 2017 Max Bupa Race Walking championship Gold-01:22:43 (Delhi)
- 2017-Asian Race Walking Championships-Bronze-01:20:59 (Japan - Nomi)
- 2017-Participated in the World Athletics Championships-23rd-1:21:40 (London)
