= Chandan Singh (athlete) =

Indian racewalker

Personal information
- Nationality: Indian
- Born: 8 June 1987 (age 39)

Sport
- Country: India
- Sport: Athletics
- Event: Racewalking

Achievements and titles
- Personal best(s): 20 km: 1:23:28 (Patiala 2013); 50 km: 4:16:23 (Saransk 2012)
Medal record
Men's athletics
Representing India
- Updated on 11 August 2013

Chandan Singh (born 8 June 1987) is an Indian racewalker who competes in the 20 kilometres and 20 kilometres walk events.

== Competition record ==
Year	Competition	Venue	Position	Event	Notes
Representing India
2012	World Cup	Saransk, Russia	57th	50 km	4:16:23
2013	World Championships	Moscow, Russia	34th	20 km	1:26:51
2015	World Championships	Beijing, China	41st	20 km walk	1:26:40
