= Indian Athletics =

National governing body for Athletics sport in India

- Sport: Athletics
- Jurisdiction: India
- Abbreviation: AFI
- Founded: 1946; 80 years ago
- Affiliation: World Athletics
- Regional affiliation: Asian Athletics
- Headquarters: G-3, Community Center, C Block, Naraina Vihar, New Delhi - 110028
- Location: New Delhi, India
- President: Bahadur Singh Sagoo
- Vice president: Anju Bobby George Jayanta Malla Baruah
- Secretary: Sandeep Mehta
- Coach: (United Kingdom) James Hillier; (Russia) Sergey Makarov; (Jamaica) Jason Dawson; (Jamaica) Jerry Lee Holness

Official website
- indianathletics.in
- (India)

The Athletics Federation of India is the national governing body for the sport of athletics in India, and is responsible for conducting competitions in the country. It was formed in 1943. It is affiliated to World Athletics and Asian Athletics Association. Anju Bobby George is the vice president. It was formerly called the Amateur Athletic Federation of India.

== History ==
Athletics Federation of India, then Amateur Athletic Federation of India (AAFI), was formed in 1946 at the initiative of Prof. G.D. Sondhi and Maharaja Yadvindra Singh. G.D. Sondhi was its first President for a short while, resigning on 13 April 1950.

AFI organises the following national-level athletics competitions in the country:

- Indian National Open Athletics Championships
- Indian National Inter-State Senior Athletics championships
- National Federation Cup Senior Athletics Competition
- Indian Open Racewalking competition
- Indian Open Javelin throw competition
- National Federation Cup under-20 Athletics championships
- National Javelin Throw Competition (Note: This competition was founded, announced by AFI in 2021. It is scheduled to host on 7 August 2022, to commemorate India's first Olympic gold medal in Javelin throw by Neeraj Chopra)
- North Zone Junior Athletics championship
- Indian open 400m competition
- South zone junior Athletics championship
- West zone junior Athletics championship
- East zone junior Athletics championship
- National youth Athletics championship
- National open athletics championship
- Indian Open Under-23 Athletics competition
- National junior Athletics championship
- National Inter-district junior Athletics meet.
- Source -

== Coaches ==
British James Hillier is the sprint and hurdles coach. Jamaican Jason Dawson is the men's 400m relay coach since Russian Galina Bukharina left. Jamaican Jerry Lee Holness is the women's 400m relay coach. Sergey Makarov is the javelin throw coach. Uwe Hohn and Klaus Bartonietz have previously coached javelin throwers.

== Controversies ==
AFI has been under pressure for the last several years due to doping scandals. The entire 4 × 400 m women's relay that won gold in the 2010 Commonwealth Games tested positive for an anabolic steroid.

The governing body's selection process for international teams has received public criticism. PU Chitra, Ajay Kumar Saroj and Sudha Singh were excluded from the 2017 World Championships in Athletics despite being eligible for entry by the International Association of Athletics Federations (the global governing body). Chitra lodged an appeal to the Kerala High Court in July 2017, though she was ultimately excluded as the court's request for inclusion was beyond the selection cut-off date. Commentator KP Mohan believed the right decision had been made to not include Chitra and several other Asian champions, given their low international ranking at that time, though he stated the controversy could have been avoided if the AFI had made its selection criteria clear before the start of the athletics season.

== Anti-Doping ==
Athletics Integrity Unit (AIU) has placed AFI in its highest rating of Category A along with Russia, Belarus, Ethiopia, Kenya, Nigeria and Ukraine as part of the list of nations with an "extremely high" risk of doping.

== See also ==
- Sports in India – Overview of sports in India
