= Moldova at the 2026 European Athletics Championships =

- WA code: MDA
- National federation: Athletics Federation of Moldova
- Website: fam.com.md

in Birmingham, United Kingdom
- Competitors: 5 (2 men and 3 women)
- Medals: Gold 0 Silver 0 Bronze 0 Total 0

European Athletics Championships appearances
- 1994; 1998; 2002; 2006; 2010; 2012; 2014; 2016; 2018; 2022; 2024; 2026

Other related appearances
- Soviet Union (1946–1990)

Moldova competed at the 2026 European Athletics Championships in Birmingham, United Kingdom, between 10 and 16 August 2026. Five athletes (3 female and two male) are sent to represent the country.

== Medals ==
Medal	Name	Event	Date

== Results ==
The following athletes are selected to compete by the Athletics Federation of Moldova.

- including alternates

Key

- Note–Ranks given for track events are within the athlete's heat only
- Q = Qualified by place in Track Events or by standard in Field Events
- q = Qualified by time in Track Events or without standard in Field Events
- qR= Advanced to the next round by referee.
- NR = National record
- CHB = Championship best
- WL = World Leading
- PB = Personal best
- SB = Season's best
- — = Round not applicable for the event
- Bye = Athlete not required to compete in round
- DNF = Did Not Finish (Running or Race Walking Events)
- DNS = Did not start
- DQ = Disqualified
- NM = No Mark (No valid trial recorded in Field Events

Track and road events

Athlete	Event	Heat		Semifinal		Final	
Athlete	Event	Result	Rank	Result	Rank	Result	Rank
Andreea Stavila-Grosu	Women's 3000 m steeplechase	9:34.40 NR	5 Q	—N/a		9:40.71	11

Field events

Athlete	Event	Qualification		Final	
Athlete	Event	Distance	Position	Distance	Position
Alexandr Mazur	Men's shot put	18.75	22	Did not advance	
Andrian Mardare	Men's javelin throw	74.41	26	Did not advance	
Iuliana Dabija	Women's triple jump	13.03	26	Did not advance	
Alexandra Emilianov	Women's discus throw	NM		Did not advance	
