= 2015 World Youth Championships in Athletics – Girls' shot put =

Girls' shot put at the 2015 World Youth Championships in Athletics
- Venue: Estadio Olímpico Pascual Guerrero
- Dates: 16 July
- Competitors: 36 from 27 nations
- Winning distance: 18.53

Medalists
gold medal	Julia Ritter	Germany
silver medal	Sophia Rivera	United States
bronze medal	Kristina Rakočević	Montenegro

The girls' shot put at the 2015 World Youth Championships in Athletics was held at the Estadio Olímpico Pascual Guerrero in Cali, Colombia on 16 July 2015.

== Records ==
Prior to the competition, the following records were as follows.

World Youth Best	Corrie de Bruin (NED)	20.52	Assen, Netherlands	13 June 1993
Championship Record	Emel Dereli (TUR)	20.14	Donetsk, Ukraine	11 July 2013
World Youth Leading	Kristina Rakočević (MNE)	18.56	Bar, Montenegro	7 March 2015

== Results ==
=== Qualification ===
With qualifying standard of 16.50 (Q) or at least the 12 best performers (q) advance to the final.

Rank	Group	Name	Nationality	1	2	3	Mark	Notes
1	A	Julia Ritter	Germany	17.61			17.61	Q, PB
2	B	Nickolette Dunbar	United States	17.36			17.36	Q
3	B	Yemisi Ogunleye	Germany	x	16.75		16.75	Q
4	B	Maja Ślepowrońska	Poland	16.71			16.71	Q
5	B	Michaela Walsh	Ireland	16.63			16.63	Q, PB
6	A	Sydney Giampietro	Italy	15.43	16.57		16.57	Q
7	B	Kristina Rakočević	Montenegro	16.52			16.52	Q
8	A	Sophia Rivera	United States	x	16.51		16.51	Q
9	A	Nikola Sułek	Poland	15.66	14.92	16.25	16.25	q
10	A	Márcia Henkels	Brazil	15.81	x	14.87	15.81	q
11	A	Dong Yu	China	15.31	x	15.72	15.72	q
12	B	Devia Brown	Jamaica	15.16	15.68	x	15.68	q, PB
13	B	Patrícia Slošárová	Slovakia	15.61	14.53	15.04	15.61	
14	B	Liu Ziyue	China	14.74	15.24	15.51	15.51	
15	B	Yuliya Bayrak	Ukraine	14.89	15.25	15.48	15.48	
16	A	Lada Cermanová	Czech Republic	15.35	x	14.75	15.35	
17	A	Maddi Wesche	New Zealand	15.23	14.07	14.58	15.23	
18	B	Lee Yu-ri	South Korea	14.86	15.01	14.92	15.01	
19	A	Thea Jensen	Denmark	13.35	15.01	14.56	15.01	
20	B	Yolandi Stander	South Africa	14.05	14.82	x	14.82	
21	A	Linn Kvaale	Norway	13.81	14.69	13.11	14.69	
22	A	Sah-Jay Stevens	Jamaica	x	x	14.68	14.68	
23	A	Sinem Yıldırım	Turkey	13.82	x	14.63	14.63	
24	B	Rosangela Núñez	Cuba	13.42	14.54	13.53	14.54	
25	A	Serena Brown	Bahamas	13.14	14.09	14.47	14.47	
26	A	Marharyta Lukashenko	Ukraine	14.22	14.45	x	14.45	
27	A	María Orozco	Mexico	x	x	14.09	14.09	
28	B	Violetta Veiland	Hungary	13.58	13.94	13.64	13.94	
29	B	Alexandra Emilianov	Moldova	x	13.78	x	13.78	
30	B	Raziye Çoban	Turkey	13.27	13.52	13.74	13.74	
31	A	Mónica Borraz	Spain	13.35	13.72	13.69	13.72	
32	B	Elise Gravningen	Norway	12.87	13.12	13.30	13.30	
33	B	Dayna Toledo	Chile	12.38	12.98	x	12.98	
34	A	Yosiris Córdoba	Colombia	12.09	12.70	12.15	12.70	
35	A	Angeline Smit	South Africa	x	x	12.46	12.46	
36	B	Akidah Briggs	Trinidad and Tobago	11.28	11.83	x	11.83	

=== Final ===
Rank	Name	Nationality	1	2	3	4	5	6	Mark	Notes
1st place, gold medalist(s)	Julia Ritter	Germany	16.75	17.27	18.34	18.53	17.73	17.12	18.53	PB
2nd place, silver medalist(s)	Sophia Rivera	United States	16.97	17.66	x	15.61	16.29	17.93	17.93	
3rd place, bronze medalist(s)	Kristina Rakočević	Montenegro	x	15.24	17.49	16.92	x	x	17.49	
4	Maja Ślepowrońska	Poland	16.85	16.18	16.94	17.41	16.57	17.04	17.41	PB
5	Sydney Giampietro	Italy	16.83	15.86	15.66	x	16.29	x	16.83	
6	Nickolette Dunbar	United States	16.60	16.49	16.80	16.75	16.54	x	16.80	
7	Yemisi Ogunleye	Germany	16.73	16.41	x	x	16.44	x	16.73	
8	Dong Yu	China	14.58	16.24	15.56	15.99	15.70	16.51	16.51	
9	Michaela Walsh	Ireland	16.03	16.22	16.08				16.22	
10	Nikola Sułek	Poland	15.50	14.62	16.17				16.17	
11	Márcia Henkels	Brazil	13.22	14.49	13.87				14.49	
12	Devia Brown	Jamaica	x	13.78	x				13.78	
