= Liechtenstein at the 2026 European Athletics Championships =

- WA code: LIE
- National federation: Liechtenstein Association of Athletics Federations
- Website: athletics.li

in Birmingham, United Kingdom
- Competitors: 1 (0 men and 1 woman)
- Medals: Gold 0 Silver 0 Bronze 0 Total 0

European Athletics Championships appearances
- 1938; 1946; 1950; 1954; 1958; 1962; 1966; 1969; 1971; 1974; 1978; 1982; 1986; 1990; 1994; 1998; 2002–2006; 2010; 2012; 2014; 2016; 2018–2022; 2024; 2026

Liechtenstein competed at the 2026 European Athletics Championships in Birmingham, United Kingdom, between 10 and 16 August 2026. One female athlete is sent to represent the country.

== Medals ==
Medal	Name	Event	Date

== Results ==
The following athletes are selected to compete by the Liechtenstein Association of Athletics Federations.

- including alternates

Key

- Note–Ranks given for track events are within the athlete's heat only
- Q = Qualified by place in Track Events or by standard in Field Events
- q = Qualified by time in Track Events or without standard in Field Events
- qR= Advanced to the next round by referee.
- NR = National record
- CHB = Championship best
- WL = World Leading
- PB = Personal best
- SB = Season's best
- — = Round not applicable for the event
- Bye = Athlete not required to compete in round
- DNF = Did Not Finish (Running or Race Walking Events)
- DNS = Did not start
- DQ = Disqualified
- NM = No Mark (No valid trial recorded in Field Events

Field events

Athlete	Event	Qualification		Final	
Athlete	Event	Distance	Position	Distance	Position
Jule Insinna	Women's discus throw	51.22	29	Did not advance	
