= 2015 World Youth Championships in Athletics – Girls' discus throw =

Girls' discus throw at the 2015 World Youth Championships in Athletics
- Venue: Estadio Olímpico Pascual Guerrero
- Dates: 15 July
- Competitors: 30 from 24 nations
- Winning distance: 52.78

Medalists
gold medal	Alexandra Emilianov	Moldova
silver medal	Kristina Rakočević	Montenegro
bronze medal	Samantha Peace	Australia

The girls' discus throw at the 2015 World Youth Championships in Athletics was held at the Estadio Olímpico Pascual Guerrero in Cali, Colombia on 15 July 2015.

== Records ==
Prior to the competition, the following records were as follows.

World Youth Best	Ilke Wyludda (GDR)	65.86	Neubrandenburg, East Germany	1 August 1986
Championship Record	Xie Yuchen (CHN)	56.34	Donetsk, Ukraine	10 July 2013
World Youth Leading	Elena Bruckner (USA)	55.68	Mountain View, United States	15 May 2015

== Results ==
=== Qualification ===
With qualifying standard of 47.50 (Q) or at least the 12 best performers (q) advance to the final.

Rank	Group	Name	Nationality	1	2	3	Mark	Notes
1	B	Alexandra Emilianov	Moldova	46.39	49.23		49.23	Q
2	A	Kristina Rakočević	Montenegro	x	49.06		49.06	Q
3	A	Ailén Armada	Argentina	45.56	48.72		48.72	Q, PB
4	A	Samantha Peace	Australia	37.61	47.32	48.14	48.14	Q, PB
5	B	Anna Karlsson	Sweden	47.18	x	47.15	47.18	q, PB
6	A	Yolandi Stander	South Africa	x	45.43	47.05	47.05	q, SB
7	B	Alma Pollorena	Mexico	43.83	46.76	x	46.76	q
8	A	Zhang Wenjun	China	44.40	44.02	46.73	46.73	q
9	B	Josephine Schaefer	United States	x	46.59	46.53	46.59	q
10	B	Babette Vandeput	Belgium	44.64	45.87	x	45.87	q
11	A	Serena Brown	Bahamas	x	x	44.96	44.96	q, PB
12	A	Yuliya Bayrak	Ukraine	40.10	44.50	x	44.50	q
13	B	Annina Brandenburg	Germany	x	x	44.11	44.11	
14	B	Berit Stunes Isene	Norway	30.97	40.80	43.71	43.71	
15	B	Konstadína Spanoudáki	Greece	42.77	43.70	41.00	43.70	
16	B	Angeline Smit	South Africa	41.29	43.64	41.90	43.64	
17	B	Catalina Bravo	Chile	43.50	x	x	43.50	
18	A	Ronja Sowalder	Germany	x	43.32	x	43.32	
19	A	Gabrielle Rains	Canada	41.93	x	40.87	41.93	
20	A	Samantha Noennig	United States	41.43	x	41.03	41.43	
21	A	Valquíria Meurer	Brazil	40.75	x	x	40.75	
22	B	Jordana Kakifukiamoko	Austria	40.59	x	x	40.59	
23	A	Emine Girgin	Turkey	40.27	39.63	x	40.27	
24	B	Devia Brown	Jamaica	33.35	40.21	38.54	40.21	
25	A	Shyledeen Smith	Jamaica	40.20	x	39.99	40.20	
26	B	Yerilda Zapata	Venezuela	x	40.20	x	40.20	
27	A	Dímitra Alexíou	Greece	x	x	39.72	39.72	
28	A	Alexandra Kálmán	Hungary	38.93	x	x	38.93	
29	B	Fatima Al-Hosani	United Arab Emirates	x	34.10	38.41	38.41	
30	B	Dong Xiaocen	China	37.69	37.22	36.24	37.69	

=== Final ===
Rank	Name	Nationality	1	2	3	4	5	6	Mark	Notes
1st place, gold medalist(s)	Alexandra Emilianov	Moldova	48.47	52.78	x	x	50.40	x	52.78	PB
2nd place, silver medalist(s)	Kristina Rakočević	Montenegro	48.91	51.04	x	50.41	x	51.41	51.41	
3rd place, bronze medalist(s)	Samantha Peace	Australia	41.63	50.59	46.33	49.30	44.38	47.59	50.59	PB
4	Alma Pollorena	Mexico	48.62	47.34	46.07	49.25	47.17	48.76	49.25	PB
5	Josephine Schaefer	United States	48.02	45.95	41.09	x	48.99	x	48.99	
6	Ailén Armada	Argentina	48.10	x	46.03	46.88	x	48.67	48.67	
7	Yolandi Stander	South Africa	46.21	x	46.53	47.85	x	47.15	47.85	SB
8	Anna Karlsson	Sweden	46.97	43.73	x	x	x	45.07	46.97	
9	Zhang Wenjun	China	46.51	44.98	45.58				46.51	
10	Babette Vandeput	Belgium	x	44.99	42.54				44.99	
11	Serena Brown	Bahamas	43.93	x	x				43.93	
12	Yuliya Bayrak	Ukraine	x	43.21	x				43.21	
