= Moldova at the 2018 European Athletics Championships =

- WA code: MDA
- National federation: FAM
- Website: lengvoji.lt

in Berlin
- Competitors: 6

European Athletics Championships appearances
- 1994; 1998; 2002; 2006; 2010; 2012; 2014; 2016; 2018; 2022; 2024

Other related appearances
- Soviet Union (1946–1990)

Moldova competed at the 2018 European Athletics Championships in Berlin, Germany, from 6 to 12 August 2018. A delegation of 6 athletes were sent to represent the country.

The following athletes were selected to compete by the Athletics Federation of Moldova.

Men
Field events

Athletes	Event	Qualification		Final	
Athletes	Event	Distance	Position	Distance	Position
Serghei Marghiev	Hammer throw	75.10	7 (q)	74.47	8
Andrian Mardare	Javelin throw	80.46	9 (q)	81.54	7

Women
Field events

Athletes	Event	Qualification		Final	
Athletes	Event	Distance	Position	Distance	Position
Dimitriana Surdu	Shot put	16.87	15	did not advance	
Alexandra Emilianov	Discus throw	58.83	6 (Q)	58.10	8
Marina Nikişenko	Hammer throw	64.37	24	did not advance	
Zalina Petrivskaya	Hammer throw	69.17	10 (q)	71.80	6
