= Moldova at the 2016 European Athletics Championships =

- WA code: MDA
- National federation: FAM
- Website: fam.com.md

in Amsterdam
- Competitors: 8 (4 men and 4 women) in 7 events
- Medals: Gold 0 Silver 0 Bronze 0 Total 0

European Athletics Championships appearances
- 1994; 1998; 2002; 2006; 2010; 2012; 2014; 2016; 2018; 2022; 2024

Other related appearances
- Soviet Union (1946–1990)

Moldova competed at the 2016 European Athletics Championships in Amsterdam, Netherlands, between 6 and 10 July 2016.

== Results ==
Men

Track & road events

Athlete	Event	Heat		Semifinal		Final	
Athlete	Event	Result	Rank	Result	Rank	Result	Rank
Roman Prodius	Half marathon	—				1:05:14	22

Field Events

Athlete	Event	Qualification		Final	
Athlete	Event	Distance	Rank	Distance	Rank
Vladimir Letnicov	Triple jump	15.98	26	did not advance	
Ivan Emilianov	Shot put	18.38	26	did not advance	
Serghei Marghiev	Hammer throw	73.95	7 q	73.21	8

Women

Field Events

Athlete	Event	Qualification		Final	
Athlete	Event	Distance	Rank	Distance	Rank
Dimitriana Surdu	Shot put	15.50	25	did not advance	
Natalia Stratulat	Discus throw	54.45	20	did not advance	
Zalina Marghieva	Hammer throw	70.04	5 Q	71.73	5
Marina Nikişenko	Hammer throw	67.76	14	did not advance	
