= 2018 IAAF World U20 Championships – Women's discus throw =

Women's discus throw at the 2018 World U20 Championships
- Venue: Ratina Stadium
- Dates: 10 July (qualification); 12 July (final)
- Competitors: 29 from 22 nations
- Winning distance: 57.89 m

Medalists
gold medal	Alexandra Emelianova	Moldova
silver medal	Helena Leveelahti	Finland
bronze medal	Silinda Morales	Cuba

The women's discus throw at the 2018 IAAF World U20 Championships was held at Ratina Stadium on 10 and 12 July.

== Records ==
Standing records prior to the 2018 IAAF World U20 Championships in Athletics
World U20 Record	Ilke Wyludda (GDR)	74.40	East Berlin, East Germany	13 September 1988
Championship Record	Ilke Wyludda (GDR)	68.24	Sudbury, Canada	31 July 1988
World U20 Leading	Alexandra Emelianova (MDA)	60.24	Waco, United States	12 May 2018

== Results ==
=== Qualification ===
The qualification round took place on 10 July in two groups, with Group A starting at 16:45 and Group B starting at 18:09. Athletes attaining a mark of at least 53.00 metres ( Q ) or at least the 12 best performers ( q ) qualified for the final.

Rank	Group	Name	Nationality	Round			Mark	Notes
Rank	Group	Name	Nationality	1	2	3	Mark	Notes
1	A	Alexandra Emelianova	Moldova	57.05			57.05	Q
2	B	Helena Leveelahti	Finland	51.12	54.87		54.87	Q
3	B	Silinda Morales	Cuba	54.05			54.05	Q
4	B	Jorinde van Klinken	Netherlands	53.58			53.58	Q
5	B	Alyssa Wilson	United States	53.32			53.32	Q
6	A	Yang Huanhuan	China	49.28	x	52.76	52.76	q
7	B	Marija Tolj	Croatia	51.77	x	x	51.77	q
8	B	Yin Yuanyuan	China	50.89	51.59	50.75	51.59	q
9	B	Valquiria Meurer	Brazil	41.97	50.92	48.10	50.92	q
10	B	Daria Harkusha	Ukraine	x	x	50.12	50.12	q
11	B	Maki Saito	Japan	47.87	49.82	49.84	49.84	q
12	A	Amanda Ngandu-Ntumba	France	49.81	x	48.25	49.81	q
13	B	Leia Braunagel	Germany	x	48.97	x	48.97	
14	A	Obiageri Amaechi	United States	x	x	48.94	48.94	
15	A	Estel Valeanu	Israel	48.70	x	47.78	48.70	
16	A	Annesofie Hartmann Nielsen	Denmark	48.64	48.02	45.10	48.64	
17	A	Enid Duut	Netherlands	48.59	48.32	x	48.59	
18	A	Caisa-Marie Lindfors	Sweden	48.49	44.82	45.81	48.49	
19	A	Talosaga Kia	Australia	48.44	46.61	x	48.44	
20	A	Charleen Zoschke	Germany	48.22	47.84	x	48.22	
21	B	Arpandeep Kaur	India	41.16	46.74	48.17	48.17	
22	B	Grace Tennant	Canada	48.12	x	46.92	48.12	
23	A	Trinity Tutti	Canada	x	47.81	x	47.81	
24	A	Mediha Salkić	Bosnia and Herzegovina	x	46.69	x	46.69	
25	B	Diana Ţigănaşu	Romania	x	45.18	x	45.18	
26	A	Muthuramalingam Karuniya	India	x	42.92	43.96	43.96	
27	B	Lacee Barnes	Cayman Islands	x	35.54	42.41	42.41	
28	A	Agnieszka Kulak	Poland	39.27	x	x	39.27	
	A	Melany del Pilar Matheus	Cuba	x	x	x	NM	

=== Final ===
The final was held on 12 July at 19:35.

Rank	Name	Nationality	Round						Mark	Notes
Rank	Name	Nationality	1	2	3	4	5	6	Mark	Notes
1st place, gold medalist(s)	Alexandra Emelianova	Moldova	x	57.06	55.14	57.89	55.68	x	57.89	
2nd place, silver medalist(s)	Helena Leveelahti	Finland	51.28	56.80	51.98	52.40	54.55	55.60	56.80	NU20R
3rd place, bronze medalist(s)	Silinda Morales	Cuba	51.89	54.97	55.37	53.58	x	53.65	55.37	PB
4	Amanda Ngandu-Ntumba	France	46.74	x	51.96	53.22	x	50.33	53.22	
5	Yin Yuanyuan	China	52.21	x	50.24	50.86	48.28	51.59	52.21	
6	Daria Harkusha	Ukraine	x	46.69	50.04	x	x	50.71	50.71	
7	Jorinde van Klinken	Netherlands	47.09	49.88	X	50.61	X	46.87	50.61	
8	Maki Saito	Japan	50.10	46.71	46.56	46.55	47.63	49.66	50.10	
9	Valquiria Meurer	Brazil	49.03	x	47.34				49.03	
10	Alyssa Wilson	United States	46.77	x	x				46.77	
11	Marija Tolj	Croatia	x	x	45.07				45.07	
12	Yang Huanhuan	China	x	x	44.91				44.91	
