= 2019 European Athletics U23 Championships – Women's discus throw =

The women's discus throw event at the 2019 European Athletics U23 Championships will be held in Gävle, Sweden, at Gavlehov Stadium Park on 11 and 12 July.

== Medalists ==
Gold	Silver	Bronze
Marija Tolj; Croatia	Alexandra Emilianov; Moldova	Annina Brandenburg; Germany

== Results ==
=== Qualification ===
Qualification rule: 53.00 (Q) or the 12 best results (q) qualified for the final.

Rank	Group	Name	Nationality	#1	#2	#3	Results	Notes
1	A	Marija Tolj	Croatia	60.25			60.25	Q
2	A	Julia Ritter	Germany	55.74			55.74	Q
3	A	Kristina Rakočević	Montenegro	55.52			55.52	Q, SB
4	B	Alexandra Emilianov	Moldova	55.41			55.41	Q
5	B	Karolina Urban	Poland	52.82	54.74		54.74	Q, SB
6	B	Annina Brandenburg	Germany	54.35			54.35	Q
7	A	Vanessa Kamga	Sweden	51.26	53.41		53.41	Q
8	A	Niamh Fogarty	Ireland	48.13	52.19	49.65	52.19	q, PB
9	A	Babette Vandeput	Belgium	x	x	51.91	51.91	q, SB
10	A	Helena Leveelahti	Finland	48.54	x	51.61	51.61	q
11	A	Estelle Valeanu	Israel	49.89	50.60	40.75	50.60	q
12	B	Johanna Lehtiö	Finland	49.36	48.05	50.47	50.47	q
13	B	Chantal Tanner	Switzerland	x	50.46	x	50.46	
14	B	Mathilda Eriksson	Sweden	x	x	49.37	49.37	
15	B	Mediha Salkić	Bosnia and Herzegovina	x	48.88	45.14	48.88	
16	B	Krista Uusi-Kinnala	Finland	44.43	48.62	48.78	48.78	
17	A	Ellen Pettersson	Sweden	39.49	x	47.19	47.19	
18	B	Maelle Philippe	France	46.72	x	x	46.72	
19	A	Agnė Jonkutė	Lithuania	x	39.72	42.26	42.26	
	B	Anna Dunayevska	Ukraine	x	x	x	NM	

=== Final ===
Rank	Name	Nationality	#1	#2	#3	#4	#5	#6	Result	Notes
1st place, gold medalist(s)	Marija Tolj	Croatia	49.05	x	62.76	x	61.86	61.17	62.76	PB
2nd place, silver medalist(s)	Alexandra Emilianov	Moldova	55.55	56.57	x	x	57.30	50.49	57.30	
3rd place, bronze medalist(s)	Annina Brandenburg	Germany	49.66	52.70	54.41	x	56.52	x	56.52	
4	Julia Ritter	Germany	55.54	x	50.28	52.01	54.17	x	55.54	
5	Vanessa Kamga	Sweden	x	x	54.81	x	54.89	55.48	55.48	
6	Kristina Rakočević	Montenegro	52.16	49.22	x	x	54.43	x	54.43	
7	Niamh Fogarty	Ireland	x	x	51.57	x	x	x	51.57	
8	Helena Leveelahti	Finland	44.89	51.03	x	x	x	x	51.03	
9	Estelle Valeanu	Israel	49.92	45.45	x				49.92	
10	Johanna Lehtiö	Finland	49.04	49.91	x				49.91	
11	Babette Vandeput	Belgium	49.67	x	46.87				49.67	
12	Karolina Urban	Poland	x	48.63	x				48.63	
