= Moldova at the 2024 European Athletics Championships =

- Flag of Moldova
- WA code: MDA

in Rome, Italy 7 June 2024 – 12 June 2022
- Competitors: 6 (2 men and 4 women)

European Athletics Championships appearances
- 1994; 1998; 2002; 2006; 2010; 2012; 2014; 2016; 2018; 2022; 2024

Other related appearances
- Soviet Union (1946–1990)

Moldova competed at the 2024 European Athletics Championships in Rome, Italy from 7–12 June 2024.

== Results ==
Moldova entered the following athletes.

Key

- Q = Qualified for the next round
- q = Qualified for the next round as a fastest loser or, in field events, by position without achieving the qualifying target
- NR = National record
- PB = Personal best
- SB = Season best
- N/A = Round not applicable for the event

=== Men ===
Field events

Athlete	Event	Qualification		Final	
Athlete	Event	Distance	Position	Distance	Position
Andrian Mardare	Javelin throw	82.18 SB	4 Q	80.22	11
Serghei Marghiev	Hammer throw	75.18	10 q	73.07	11

=== Women ===
Track and road events

Athlete	Event	Heat		Semifinal		Final	
Athlete	Event	Result	Rank	Result	Rank	Result	Rank
Andreea Stavila	3000 metres steeplechase	9:45.35 PB	12	—		Did not advance	

Field events

Athlete	Event	Qualification		Final	
Athlete	Event	Distance	Position	Distance	Position
Dimitriana Bezede	Shot put	16.80	14	Did not advance	
Alexandra Emilianov	Discus throw	60.65	12 q	60.24	11
Zalina Marghieva	Hammer throw	71.33	4 q	70.57	6
