= Liechtenstein at the 2016 European Athletics Championships =

- WA code: LIE
- National federation: LLV

in Amsterdam
- Competitors: 1 (1 man) in 1 event
- Medals: Gold 0 Silver 0 Bronze 0 Total 0

European Athletics Championships appearances
- 1938; 1946; 1950; 1954; 1958; 1962; 1966; 1969; 1971; 1974; 1978; 1982; 1986; 1990; 1994; 1998; 2002–2006; 2010; 2012; 2014; 2016; 2018–2022; 2024

Liechtenstein competed at the 2016 European Athletics Championships in Amsterdam, Netherlands, between 6 and 10 July 2016.

== Results ==
Men

Track & road events

Athlete	Event	Heat		Semifinal		Final	
Athlete	Event	Result	Rank	Result	Rank	Result	Rank
Marcel Tschopp	Half marathon	—				1:15:36	83
