= 2016 IAAF World U20 Championships – Women's discus throw =

The women's discus throw event at the 2016 IAAF World U20 Championships was held at Zdzisław Krzyszkowiak Stadium on 19 and 21 July.

== Medalists ==
Gold	Kristina Rakočević; Montenegro
Silver	Kirsty Williams; Australia
Bronze	Alexandra Emilianov; Moldova

== Records ==
Standing records prior to the 2016 IAAF World U20 Championships in Athletics
World Junior Record	Ilke Wyludda (GDR)	74.40	East Berlin, East Germany	13 September 1988
Championship Record	Ilke Wyludda (GDR)	68.24	Sudbury, Canada	31 July 1988
World Junior Leading	Kristina Rakočević (MNE)	58.30	Split, Croatia	16 April 2016

== Results ==
=== Qualification ===
Qualification: 51.50 (Q) or at least 12 best performers (q) qualified for the final.

Rank	Group	Name	Nationality	#1	#2	#3	Result	Note
1	B	Julia Ritter	Germany	47.52	53.84		53.84	Q, PB
2	B	Elena Bruckner	United States	53.83			53.83	Q
3	B	Alexandra Emilianov	Moldova	53.19			53.19	Q
4	A	Kristina Rakočević	Montenegro	52.92			52.92	Q
5	B	Kirsty Williams	Australia	50.32	52.83		52.83	Q
6	A	Sun Kangping	China	51.04	52.68		52.68	Q, SB
7	A	Ailén Armada	Argentina	x	51.23	x	51.23	q, PB
8	B	Serena Brown	Bahamas	47.82	49.37	50.94	50.94	q, NU20R
9	B	Devia Brown	Jamaica	x	45.51	49.56	49.56	q, PB
10	A	Kiana Phelps	United States	49.55	45.56	49.49	49.55	q
11	A	Lara Kempka	Germany	45.75	49.28	44.28	49.28	q
12	A	Jorinde van Klinken	Netherlands	40.00	48.62	41.83	48.62	q
13	B	Krista Uusi-Kinnala	Finland	x	48.27	x	48.27	
14	A	Anna Dunaievska	Ukraine	x	48.17	x	48.17	
15	A	Amira Sayed	Egypt	47.81	47.83	47.68	47.83	SB
16	B	Yuliia Bairak	Ukraine	46.12	44.87	47.57	47.57	
17	A	Bianca Hansen	Australia	46.67	x	47.06	47.06	
18	B	Lin Aoxue	China	46.16	x	x	46.16	
19	B	Veranika Kuzmich	Belarus	45.93	44.56	45.07	45.93	
20	A	Gabrielle Rains	Canada	41.18	45.85	x	45.85	
21	A	Marija Tolj	Croatia	39.69	x	45.76	45.76	
22	B	Nanaka Kori	Japan	42.18	x	45.46	45.46	
23	B	Thelma Lind Kristjánsdóttir	Iceland	42.53	42.45	44.41	44.41	
24	A	Lauren Bruce	New Zealand	41.98	42.30	39.65	42.30	
25	B	Polina Makaeva	Bulgaria	42.21	x	36.99	42.21	
26	A	Fatima Al-Hosani	United Arab Emirates	37.40	35.82	x	37.40	SB
	A	Shanice Love	Jamaica	x	x	x	NM	
	B	Rijaj Salem	Libya				DNS	

=== Final ===
Rank	Name	Nationality	#1	#2	#3	#4	Result	Note
1st place, gold medalist(s)	Kristina Rakočević	Montenegro	51.45	53.56	56.36	x	56.36	
2nd place, silver medalist(s)	Kirsty Williams	Australia	49.58	x	53.91	52.78	53.91	PB
3rd place, bronze medalist(s)	Alexandra Emilianov	Moldova	47.71	50.17	53.08	52.53	53.08	
4	Serena Brown	Bahamas	52.73	52.28	45.81	50.82	52.73	NU20R
5	Kiana Phelps	United States	51.38	52.60	52.43	49.16	52.60	
6	Ailén Armada	Argentina	x	x	52.53	51.84	52.53	PB
7	Elena Bruckner	United States	52.04	51.99	51.82		52.04	
8	Sun Kangping	China	51.70	49.63	50.95		51.70	
9	Julia Ritter	Germany	46.22	48.86	50.95		50.95	
10	Jorinde van Klinken	Netherlands	x	44.52	49.15		49.15	
11	Devia Brown	Jamaica	47.31	x	48.12		48.12	
12	Lara Kempka	Germany	x	43.69	x		43.69	
