= Moldova at the 2022 European Athletics Championships =

- Flag of Moldova
- WA code: MDA
- National federation: Athletics Federation of Moldova

in Munich, Germany 15 August 2022 – 21 August 2022
- Competitors: 7 (4 men and 3 women) in 6 events
- Medals: Gold 0 Silver 0 Bronze 0 Total 0

European Athletics Championships appearances
- 1994; 1998; 2002; 2006; 2010; 2012; 2014; 2016; 2018; 2022; 2024

Other related appearances
- Soviet Union (1946–1990)

Moldova competed at the 2022 European Athletics Championships in Munich, Germany, between 15 and 21 August 2022

== Results ==
Moldova entered the following athletes.

Key

- Q = Qualified for the next round
- q = Qualified for the next round as a fastest loser or, in field events, by position without achieving the qualifying target
- NR = National record
- PB = Personal best
- SB = Season best
- N/A = Round not applicable for the event

=== Men ===
Track and road events

Athlete	Event	Final	
Athlete	Event	Result	Rank
Maxim Răileanu	Marathon	2:21:01	47
Ivan Siuris	Marathon	2:25:17	56

Field events

Athlete	Event	Qualification		Final	
Athlete	Event	Distance	Position	Distance	Position
Serghei Marghiev	Hammer throw	74.26	11 q	73.89	10
Andrian Mardare	Javelin throw	78.78	6 q	77.49	7

=== Women ===
Track and road events

Athlete	Event	Final	
Athlete	Event	Result	Rank
Lilia Fisikovici	Marathon	2:47:44	47

Field events

Athlete	Event	Qualification		Final	
Athlete	Event	Distance	Position	Distance	Position
Dimitriana Bezede	Shot put	17.76	9 q	16.98	11
Zalina Marghieva	Hammer throw	67.15	16	did not advance	
