= Moldova at the 2015 World Championships in Athletics =

- WA code: MDA
- Website: fam.com.md

in Beijing
- Competitors: 4
- Medals: Gold 0 Silver 0 Bronze 0 Total 0

World Championships in Athletics appearances
- 1993; 1995; 1997; 1999; 2001; 2003; 2005; 2007; 2009; 2011; 2013; 2015; 2017; 2019; 2022; 2023; 2025

Moldova competed at the 2015 World Championships in Athletics in Beijing, China, from 22–30 August 2015.

== Results ==
(q – qualified, NM – no mark, SB – season best)

=== Men ===
Track and road events

Athlete	Event	Heat		Semifinal		Final	
Athlete	Event	Result	Rank	Result	Rank	Result	Rank
Roman Prodius	Marathon	—N/a				2:26:46	31

Field events

Athlete	Event	Qualification		Final	
Athlete	Event	Distance	Position	Distance	Position
Serghei Marghiev	Hammer throw	71.61	23	did not advance	

=== Women ===
Field events

Athlete	Event	Qualification		Final	
Athlete	Event	Distance	Position	Distance	Position
Zalina Marghieva	Hammer throw	72.29	5 q	72.38	8
Marina Nichișenco	Hammer throw	66.63	25	did not advance	
