= 2026 European Athletics Championships – Women's discus throw =

Women's discus throw at the 2026 European Athletics Championships
- Venue: Alexander Stadium
- Location: Birmingham, United Kingdom
- Dates: 12 August 2026 (qualification) 14 August 2026 (final)
- Competitors: 30 (target)
- Winning distance: 67.67 m

Medalists
gold medal	Jorinde van Klinken	Netherlands
silver medal	Shanice Craft	Germany
bronze medal	Vanessa Kamga	Sweden

The women's discus throw at the 2026 European Athletics Championships took place over two rounds at the Alexander Stadium in Birmingham, United Kingdom, on 12 and 14 August 2026.

== Background ==
Records before the 2026 European Athletics Championships
Record	Athlete (nation)	Distance	Location	Date
World record	Gabriele Reinsch (GDR)	76.80 m	Neubrandenburg, East Germany	9 July 1988
European record	Gabriele Reinsch (GDR)	76.80 m	Neubrandenburg, East Germany	9 July 1988
Championship record	Diana Gansky (GDR)	71.36 m	Stuttgart, West Germany	28 August 1986
World leading	Valarie Sion (USA)	73.10 m	Ramona, United States	11 April 2026
European leading	Jorinde van Klinken (NED)	70.99 m	Ramona, United States	11 April 2026

== Qualification ==
For the women's discus throw, the qualification period was from 27 July 2025 to 26 July 2026. Athletes qualified by achieving the entry standard of 61.00 m or better, by wildcard for the 2024 European Athletics Champion (not used since Sandra Elkasević elected not to participate), or by their position on the World Athletics Rankings for the event. The target number was 30 athletes.

Qualification standings per 31 July 2026
QP	CP	Country	Athlete	Status	Details
1	1	Netherlands	Jorinde van Klinken	Qualified by Entry Standard	70.99 - Millican Field at Throw Town, Ramona, OK (USA) - 11 APR 2026
2	2	Netherlands	Alida van Daalen	Qualified by Entry Standard	69.31 - Un. of Kentucky Outdoor Track Facility, Lexington, KY (USA) - 30 MAY 2026
3	1	Sweden	Vanessa Kamga	Qualified by Entry Standard	66.61 - National Stadium, Tokyo (JPN) - 14 SEP 2025
4	1	Germany	Marike Steinacker	Qualified by Entry Standard	66.55 - Millican Field at Throw Town, Ramona, OK (USA) - 09 APR 2026
5	2	Germany	Shanice Craft	Qualified by Entry Standard	66.18 - Lohrheidestadion, Wattenscheid, Bochum (GER) - 25 JUL 2026
6	1	France	Melina Robert-Michon	Qualified by Entry Standard	65.96 - Millican Field at Throw Town, Ramona, OK (USA) - 09 APR 2026
7	3	Germany	Leia Braunagel	Qualified by Entry Standard	64.96 - Sportplatz des OSP Magdeburg, Magdeburg (GER) - 14 MAY 2026
8	1	Italy	Daisy Osakue	Qualified by Entry Standard	64.68 - Stade Municipal Du Travet, Castres (FRA) - 14 JUN 2026
reserve	4	Germany	Kristin Pudenz	Qualified by Entry Standard	64.28 - UNION-Stadion, Schönebeck (GER) - 20 JUN 2026
9	1	Portugal	Liliana Cá	Qualified by Entry Standard	64.08 - Estadio Universitario, Lisboa (POR) - 25 JUL 2026
10	1	Croatia	Marija Tolj	Qualified by Entry Standard	63.55 - Stadion Erzgebirgsblick, Gelenau (GER) - 07 JUN 2026
11	1	Moldova	Alexandra Emilianov	Qualified by Entry Standard	63.46 - National Stadium, Tokyo (JPN) - 13 SEP 2025
12	2	Portugal	Irina Rodrigues	Qualified by Entry Standard	63.17 - Centro Nacional de Lançamentos, Leiria (POR) - 10 AUG 2025
13	2	Sweden	Caisa-Marie Lindfors	Qualified by Entry Standard	62.46 - Sola Arena, Karlstad (SWE) - 08 JUL 2026
14	1	Lithuania	Ieva Gumbs	Qualified by Entry Standard	62.42 - Millican Field at Throw Town, Ramona, OK (USA) - 08 JUL 2026
15	1	Poland	Daria Zabawska	Qualified by Entry Standard	62.27 - GPS Stadium, Nicosia (CYP) - 15 MAR 2026
reserve	5	Germany	Joyce Oguama	Qualified by Entry Standard	62.13 - LSU Bernie Moore Stadium, Baton Rouge, LA (USA) - 04 APR 2026
16	1	Great Britain & N.I.	Zara Obamakinwa	Qualified by Entry Standard	61.87 - Norman Park Athletics Track, Bromley (GBR) - 11 JUL 2026
17	1	Liechtenstein	Jule Insinna	Qualified by Universality Place	
18	1	Denmark	Annesofie Hartmann Nielsen	Qualified by World Rankings	19th - 1109 points
19	2	Denmark	Lisa Brix Pedersen	Qualified by World Rankings	22nd - 1099 points
20	1	Spain	Inés López	Qualified by World Rankings	23rd - 1098 points
21	1	Turkey	Özlem Becerek	Qualified by World Rankings	24th - 1097 points
22	3	Sweden	Mathilda Eriksson	Qualified by World Rankings	29th - 1058 points
23	2	Poland	Weronika Muszyńska	Qualified by World Rankings	30th - 1057 points
24	1	Greece	Chrysoula Anagnostopoulou	Qualified by World Rankings	31st - 1056 points
25	2	Italy	Benedetta Benedetti	Qualified by World Rankings	34th - 1049 points
reserve	6	Germany	Curly Brown	Qualified by World Rankings	35th - 1043 points
reserve	4	Sweden	Ebba Salomonsson Lind	Qualified by World Rankings	36th - 1040 points
26	3	Denmark	Anne Juul Jensen	Qualified by World Rankings	37th - 1036 points
27	1	Hungary	Dóra Kerekes	Qualified by World Rankings	38th - 1034 points
28	1	Israel	Estel Valeanu	Qualified by World Rankings	40th - 1034 points
29	1	Finland	Helena Leveelahti	Qualified by World Rankings	45th - 1016 points
30	3	Italy	Emily Conte	Qualified by World Rankings	47th - 1012 points
reserve	1	Cyprus	Marina Hadjicosta	Next best by World Rankings	48th - 1012 points
reserve	1	Iceland	Hera Christensen	Next best by World Rankings	49th - 1011 points
reserve	4	Italy	Stefania Strumillo	Next best by World Rankings	50th - 1010 points
reserve	5	Italy	Diletta Fortuna	Next best by World Rankings	61st - 979 points

== Schedule ==
Date	Time	Round
12 August 2026	10:40	Qualification.
14 August 2026	20:30	Final

All times are local times (UTC+1)

== Results ==
=== Qualification ===
The qualification round was held on 12 August 2026, at 10:37 in the morning. All athletes meeting the Qualification Standard (Q) of 62.50 m or at least 12 best performers (q) advanced to the final.

==== Group A ====
Place	Athlete	Nation	Round			Result	Notes
Place	Athlete	Nation	#1	#2	#3	Result	Notes
1	Shanice Craft	Germany	63.46			63.46 m	Q
2	Jorinde van Klinken	Netherlands	62.74			62.74 m	Q
3	Liliana Cá	Portugal	61.86	x	60.38	61.86 m	q
4	Inés López	Spain	x	61.45	x	61.45 m	q, PB
5	Melina Robert-Michon	France	60.03	60.43	60.89	60.89 m	q
6	Kristin Pudenz	Germany	54.56	60.48	x	60.48 m	q
7	Caisa-Marie Lindfors	Sweden	x	59.57	57.52	59.57 m	q
8	Ieva Gumbs	Lithuania	58.03	57.23	55.96	58.03 m	
9	Annesofie Hartmann Nielsen	Denmark	57.99	x	x	57.99 m	
10	Chrysoula Anagnostopoulou	Greece	55.13	15.51	54.78	55.13 m	
11	Dóra Kerekes	Hungary	50.50	54.02	x	54.02 m	
12	Weronika Muszyńska	Poland	x	52.43	53.80	53.80 m	
13	Ebba Salomonsson Lind	Sweden	51.10	48.16	53.50	53.50 m	
14	Emily Conte	Italy	x	52.18	45.79	52.18 m	
—	Alexandra Emilianov	Moldova	x	x	x	NM	

==== Group B ====
Place	Athlete	Nation	Round			Result	Notes
Place	Athlete	Nation	#1	#2	#3	Result	Notes
1	Vanessa Kamga	Sweden	64.65			64.65 m	Q
2	Alida van Daalen	Netherlands	x	56.19	62.58	62.58 m	Q
3	Marija Tolj	Croatia	58.91	x	59.85	59.85 m	q
4	Daria Zabawska	Poland	x	x	59.37	59.37 m	q
5	Özlem Becerek	Turkey	57.85	58.48	57.62	58.48 m	q
6	Lisa Brix Pedersen	Denmark	57.78	x	56.00	57.78 m	
7	Irina Rodrigues	Portugal	56.84	57.46	57.29	57.46 m	
8	Daisy Osakue	Italy	x	x	57.41	57.41 m	
9	Anne Juul Jensen	Denmark	48.91	56.58	x	56.58 m	
10	Benedetta Benedetti	Italy	53.53	55.72	55.03	55.72 m	
11	Zara Obamakinwa	Great Britain & N.I.	55.17	x	x	55.17 m	
12	Marike Steinacker	Germany	x	x	54.05	54.05 m	
13	Helena Leveelahti	Finland	51.96	51.33	51.86	51.96 m	
14	Estelle Valeanu	Israel	49.62	42.52	51.37	51.37 m	
15	Jule Insinna	Liechtenstein	46.73	51.22	x	51.22 m	

=== Final ===
The final was held on 14 August 2026, at 20:30 in the evening.

Place	Athlete	Nation	Round						Result	Notes
Place	Athlete	Nation	#1	#2	#3	#4	#5	#6	Result	Notes
1st place, gold medalist(s)	Jorinde van Klinken	Netherlands	67.67	64.59	65.96	x	x	x	67.67 m	
2nd place, silver medalist(s)	Shanice Craft	Germany	64.49	62.97	65.72	62.34	64.58	64.53	65.72 m	
3rd place, bronze medalist(s)	Vanessa Kamga	Sweden	63.66	64.39	61.86	64.61	x	61.03	64.61 m	
4	Alida van Daalen	Netherlands	63.33	x	61.35	64.22	x	63.07	64.22 m	
5	Kristin Pudenz	Germany	60.06	62.58	63.27	60.79	61.53	x	63.27 m	
6	Marija Tolj	Croatia	63.08	x	x	59.66	x	59.99	63.08 m	
7	Caisa-Marie Lindfors	Sweden	59.61	59.12	61.66	x	x	62.39	62.39 m	
8	Liliana Cá	Portugal	60.87	x	58.90	x	x	x	60.87 m	
9	Melina Robert-Michon	France	60.58	x	57.94				60.58 m	
10	Daria Zabawska	Poland	58.46	x	58.54				58.54 m	
11	Özlem Becerek	Turkey	57.27	x	56.99				57.27 m	
12	Inés López	Spain	50.11	53.13	56.59				56.59 m	
