= 2017 World Youth Championships in Athletics – Girls' shot put =

The Girls' shot put at the 2017 World Youth Championships in Athletics was held on 12 July.

== Medalists ==
| Gold | Silver | Bronze |

== Records ==
Prior to the competition, the following records were as follows.

| World Youth Best | Corrie de Bruin (NED) | 20.52 m | Assen, Netherlands | 13 June 1993 |
| Championship Record | Emel Dereli (TUR) | 20.14 m | Donetsk, Ukraine | 11 July 2013 |
| World Youth Leading | Jorinde van Klinken (NED) | 19.58 m | Halle, Germany | 21 May 2017 |

== Final ==
| Rank | Name | Nationality | #1 | #2 | #3 | #4 | #5 | #6 | Mark | Notes | Points |
|---|---|---|---|---|---|---|---|---|---|---|---|
| | Ewa Rózanska | Poland | | | | | | | | | |
| | Karyna Yehinian | Belarus | | | | | | | | | |
| | Selina Dantzler | Germany | | | | | | | | | |
| | Denisa Precková | Czech Republic | | | | | | | | | |
| | Ioana Diana Tiganasu | Romania | | | | | | | | | |
| | Tetyana Kravchenko | Ukraine | | | | | | | | | |
| | Sun Yue | China | | | | | | | | | |
| | Meike Strydom | South Africa | | | | | | | | | |
| | Amanda Ngandu-Ntumba | France | | | | | | | | | |
| | Yu Tianxiao | China | | | | | | | | | |
| | Jule Steuer | Germany | | | | | | | | | |
| | Urte Bacianskaite | Lithuania | | | | | | | | | |
| | Peninah Akoth | Kenya | | | | | | | | | |
| | Ashley Bologna | France | | | | | | | | | |
| | Gleice Stefanie de Castro | Brazil | | | | | | | | | |
