= 2017 World Youth Championships in Athletics – Girls' discus throw =

The Girls' discus throw at the 2017 World Youth Championships in Athletics was held on 12 and 14 July.

== Medalists ==
Gold	Silver	Bronze

== Records ==
Prior to the competition, the following records were as follows.

World Youth Best	Ilke Wyludda (GDR)	65.86 m	Neubrandenburg, East Germany	1 August 1986
Championship Record	Xie Yuchen (CHN)	56.34 m	Donetsk, Ukraine	10 July 2013
World Youth Leading	Jorinde van Klinken (NED)	53.77 m	Halle, Germany	21 May 2017

== Qualification ==
Qualification rule: 48.00 m (Q) or at least 12 best (q) performers.

Rank	Name	Nationality	#1	#2	#3	Mark	Notes	Points
	Dahiana López	Uruguay						
	Silinda Morales	Cuba						
	Yin Yuanyuan	China						
	Ewa Rózanska	Poland						
	Ioana Diana Tiganasu	Romania						
	Kimone Reid	Jamaica						
	Vivian Cheptoo	Kenya						
	Melany del Matheus	Cuba						
	Sandy Uhlig	Germany						
	Rana Ahmed	Egypt						
	Tharina van der Walt	South Africa						
	Rima Nasr	Egypt						
	Amanda Ngandu-Ntumba	France						
	Liu Quantong	China						
	Leia Braunagel	Germany						
	Annesofie Hartmann Nielsen	Denmark						
	Daria Harkusha	Ukraine						
