= 2021 European Athletics U23 Championships – Women's discus throw =

Women's discus throw at the 2021 European Athletics U23 Championships
- Venue: Kadriorg Stadium, Tallinn
- Dates: 8–9 July
- Competitors: 30 from 22 nations
- Winning distance: 63.02

Medalists
gold medal	Jorinde van Klinken	Netherlands
silver medal	Helena Leveelahti	Finland
bronze medal	Amanda Ngandu-Ntumba	France

The women's discus throw event at the 2021 European Athletics U23 Championships was held in Tallinn, Estonia, at Kadriorg Stadium on 8 and 9 July.

== Records ==
Prior to the competition, the records were as follows:

European U23 record	Irina Meszynski (GDR)	73.36	Prague, Czechoslovakia	17 August 1984
Championship U23 record	Kateryna Karsak (UKR)	64.40	Debrecen, Hungary	13 July 2007

== Results ==
=== Qualification ===
Qualification rule: 55.00 (Q) or the 12 best results (q) qualified for the final.

Rank	Group	Name	Nationality	#1	#2	#3	Results	Notes
1	A	Jorinde van Klinken	Netherlands	45.79	61.97		61.97	Q
2	B	Marija Tolj	Croatia	57.76			57.76	Q
3	A	Amanda Ngandu-Ntumba	France	49.91	53.89	55.86	55.86	Q
4	A	Caisa-Marie Lindfors	Sweden	55.41			55.41	Q
5	B	Annesofie Hartmann Nielsen	Denmark	52.94	54.54	55.22	55.22	Q
6	B	Antonia Kinzel	Germany	51.50	54.35	54.43	54.43	q
7	A	Estel Valeanu	Israel	35.80	54.06	x	54.06	q
8	B	Alexandra Emilianov	Moldova	x	53.51	x	53.51	q
9	A	Helena Leveelahti	Finland	20.27	53.23	50.40	53.23	q
10	B	Nina Staruch	Poland	x	51.36	52.32	52.32	q, PB
11	B	Ulada Zhavarankava	Belarus	51.72	x	x	51.72	q
12	B	Janneke Pluimes	Netherlands	50.74	x	49.24	50.74	q
13	B	Leia Braunagel	Germany	47.67	50.70	x	50.70	
14	A	Diletta Fortuna	Italy	45.39	50.18	50.05	50.18	
15	A	Weronika Muszyńska	Poland	42.76	48.48	47.25	48.48	
16	B	Ivanilda Lopes	Portugal	45.18	48.27	47.50	48.27	
17	A	Lea Bostjancic	Austria	43.43	48.22	46.08	48.22	
18	A	Michelle Santer	Germany	47.75	x	x	47.75	
19	B	Hana Urankar	Slovenia	47.65	x	x	47.65	
20	B	Daniella Persson	Sweden	x	47.43	x	47.43	
21	A	Enid Duut	Netherlands	x	x	47.20	47.20	
22	A	Daria Harkusha	Ukraine	45.50	46.34	x	46.34	
23	A	Agnė Jonkutė	Lithuania	39.79	40.67	44.14	44.14	
24	A	Niamh Fogarty	Ireland	x	37.00	43.31	43.31	
25	A	Liza Lap	Slovenia	43.12	41.00	x	43.12	
26	B	Valeriya Deykun	Ukraine	43.10	x	x	43.10	
27	B	Mediha Salkić	Bosnia and Herzegovina	x	42.62	38.43	42.62	
28	B	Chiara Baumann	Switzerland	41.36	41.94	42.06	42.06	
	A	Barbora Tichá	Czech Republic	x	x	x	NM	
	B	Ioana Diana Tigănasu	Romania	x	x	x	NM	

=== Final ===
Rank	Name	Nationality	#1	#2	#3	#4	#5	#6	Result	Notes
1st place, gold medalist(s)	Jorinde van Klinken	Netherlands	61.29	63.02	60.19	x	x	60.80	63.02	
2nd place, silver medalist(s)	Helena Leveelahti	Finland	55.18	x	56.26	54.27	57.09	x	57.09	PB
3rd place, bronze medalist(s)	Amanda Ngandu-Ntumba	France	44.93	54.00	53.23	55.57	x	56.24	56.24	
4	Caisa-Marie Lindfors	Sweden	x	x	53.47	x	54.31	55.48	55.48	
5	Marija Tolj	Croatia	x	53.62	x	x	x	x	53.62	
6	Antonia Kinzel	Germany	x	52.49	51.57	52.26	x	51.84	52.49	
7	Ulada Zhavarankava	Belarus	46.07	x	51.40	x	x	47.90	51.40	
8	Janneke Pluimes	Netherlands	50.80	x	x	50.28	x	45.36	50.80	
9	Nina Staruch	Poland	x	x	49.91				49.91	
10	Alexandra Emilianov	Moldova	49.30	x	x				49.30	
11	Estel Valeanu	Israel	49.25	x	48.38				49.25	
	Annesofie Hartmann Nielsen	Denmark	x	x	x				NM	
