= 2025 European Athletics U23 Championships – Women's discus throw =

Women's discus throw at the 2025 European Athletics U23 Championships
- Venue: Fana Stadion
- Location: Bergen, Norway
- Dates: 19 July (qualification); 20 July (final)
- Winning distance: 58.20 m NU23R

Medalists
gold medal	Inés López	Spain
silver medal	Benedetta Benedetti	Italy
bronze medal	Milina Wepiwé	Germany

The women's discus throw event at the 2025 European Athletics U23 Championships was held in Bergen, Norway, at Fana Stadion on 19 and 20 July.

== Records ==
Prior to the competition, the records were as follows:

Record	Athlete (nation)	Distance (m)	Location	Date
European U23 record	Irina Meszynski (GDR)	73.36 m	Prague, Czechoslovakia	17 August 1984
Championship U23 record	Kateryna Karsak (UKR)	64.40 m	Debrecen, Hungary	13 July 2007

== Results ==
=== Qualification ===
All athletes over 56.00 m (Q) or at least the 12 best performers (q) advance to the final.

==== Group A ====
Place	Athlete	Nation	#1	#2	#3	Result	Notes
1	Inés López	Spain	56.35			56.35 m	Q
2	Benedetta Benedetti	Italy	54.91	x	50.41	54.91 m	q
3	Lucija Leko	Croatia	52.32	51.26	x	52.32 m	q
4	Katja Seng	Germany	49.24	51.42	51.02	51.42 m	q
5	Anna Gavigan	Ireland	50.51	51.34	50.58	51.34 m	q
6	Raquel Gomes	Portugal	40.30	50.50	50.50	50.50 m	q
7	Hera Christensen	Iceland	x	50.37	x	50.37 m	q
8	Petra Baukó	Hungary	43.54	44.71	47.81	47.81 m	
9	Milica Poznanović	Serbia	x	47.25	47.61	47.61 m	
10	Joanna Marszelewska	Poland	47.38	46.01	x	47.38 m	
11	Marie Bovele Linaka	France	37.02	46.19	x	46.19 m	
12	Giada Borin	Switzerland	45.63	x	x	45.63 m	
13	Mette-Elise Ødegård Vaskinn	Norway	42.67	40.52	45.43	45.43 m	
14	Edvina Norberg	Sweden	42.97	44.87	x	44.87 m	
15	Iwelina Milkowa	Bulgaria	43.30	44.37	x	44.37 m	
16	Gülcan Uzun	Turkey	43.60	43.14	x	43.60 m	
—	Vineta Krūmiņa	Latvia	x	x	x	NM	

==== Group B ====
Place	Athlete	Nation	#1	#2	#3	Result	Notes
1	Princesse Hyman	France	48.27	53.50	49.95	53.50 m	q
2	Ebba Salomonsson Lind	Sweden	x	51.21	x	51.21 m	q
3	Lea Bork	Germany	x	50.74	44.91	50.74 m	q
4	Milina Wepiwé	Germany	46.55	48.61	49.12	49.12 m	q
5	Hanna Emilie Hjeltnes	Norway	46.66	48.43	48.42	48.43 m	q
6	Enni Aula	Finland	44.27	46.24	48.43	48.43 m	
7	Kajsa Borrman	Sweden	48.23	48.16	x	48.23 m	
8	Jule Insinna	Liechtenstein	44.98	47.47	44.14	47.47 m	
9	Hannah Ladinig	Austria	46.08	47.22	45.24	47.22 m	
10	Sofia Coppari	Italy	46.57	43.99	43.92	46.57 m	
11	Ioanna Arampatzi	Greece	x	45.37	46.26	46.26 m	
12	Aleksandra Torończak	Poland	x	44.36	x	44.36 m	
13	Laura Delač	Croatia	x	x	43.92	43.92 m	
14	Nneka Naomey Ezenwa	Spain	x	39.90	x	39.90 m	
—	Zara Obamakinwa	Great Britain	x	x	x	NM	
—	Paulina Stuglytė	Lithuania	x	x	x	NM	

=== Final ===
Place	Athlete	Nation	#1	#2	#3	#4	#5	#6	Result	Notes
1st place, gold medalist(s)	Inés López	Spain	58.20	x	x	57.40	x	x	58.20 m	NU23R
2nd place, silver medalist(s)	Benedetta Benedetti	Italy	x	53.42	56.98	55.25	53.59	53.59	56.98 m	PB
3rd place, bronze medalist(s)	Milina Wepiwé	Germany	50.67	x	54.61	56.82	x	51.61	56.82 m	
4	Katja Seng	Germany	51.47	51.82	x	51.38	53.46	x	53.46 m	
5	Hera Christensen	Iceland	51.28	50.03	53.44	x	x	52.50	53.44 m	
6	Ebba Salomonsson Lind	Sweden	51.48	x	x	52.92	x	50.22	52.92 m	
7	Lucija Leko	Croatia	49.12	52.05	x		x	51.54	52.05 m	
8	Anna Gavigan	Ireland	x	50.84	51.16	x	x	51.54	51.16 m	
9	Lea Bork	Germany	49.46	x	x				49.46 m	
10	Raquel Gomes	Portugal	48.95	x	x				48.95 m	
11	Hanna Emilie Hjeltnes	Norway	44.75	48.84	x				48.84 m	
12	Princesse Hyman	France	x	47.29	x				47.29 m	
