= Marija Tolj =

Croatian discus thrower (born 1999)

Personal information
- Born: 29 November 1999 (age 26) Orebić, Croatia

Sport
- Sport: Athletics
- Event: Discus throw
- Club: AK Dinamo-Zrinjevac
- Coached by: Roland Varga (2014–); Ivan Ivančić (–2014)

Marija Tolj (born 29 November 1999) is a Croatian athlete specialising in the discus throw. She won the gold medal at the 2019 European U23 Championships. She competed at the 2020 and 2024 Olympic Games, as well as multiple other major championships. Her personal best in the event is 64.71 metres set in Oran in 2022.

== Career ==
She won the gold medal in the discus throw at the 2019 European U23 Championships.

She competed at the 2019 European Athletics Team Championships in Varazdin, Croatia, placing second in the discus throw in the second division competition. She competed in the discus throw at the 2019 World Athletics Championships in Doha, Qatar, but did not qualify for the final.

She competed at the delayed 2020 Olympic Games in Tokyo, Japan held in 2021 where she had a best throw of 61.48 metres in the qualified round and missed a place in the final by four centimetres.

She competed at the 2022 World Athletics Championships in Eugene, Oregon, where she successfully reached the final and placed eighth overall with a best throw of 63.07 metres. She competed at the 2022 European Athletics Championships in Munich, Germany, where she qualified for the final and placed sixth overall with a best throw of 63.37 metres.

She competed at the 2023 European Athletics Team Championships in Silesia, Poland. She competed at the 2023 World Athletics Championships in Budapest, Hungary where best throw of 58.92 was not enough to progress to the final.

She competed at the 2024 European Athletics Championships in Rome, Italy, finishing eighth in the final with a best throw of 61.42 metres. She competed at the 2024 Olympic Games in Paris, France but did not qualify for the final with a best throw of 59.87 metres.

== International competitions ==
Year	Competition	Venue	Position	Event	Notes
Representing Croatia
2015	European Youth Olympic Festival	Tbilisi, Georgia	19th (q)	Shot put (3 kg)	12.31 m
2015	European Youth Olympic Festival	Tbilisi, Georgia	6th	Discus throw	43.79 m
2016	World U20 Championships	Bydgoszcz, Poland	18th (q)	Shot put	14.00 m
2016	World U20 Championships	Bydgoszcz, Poland	21st (q)	Discus throw	45.76 m
2017	European U20 Championships	Grosseto, Italy	4th	Discus throw	52.97 m
2018	European Throwing Cup (U23)	Leiria, Portugal	1st	Discus throw	56.31 m
2018	World U20 Championships	Tampere, Finland	11th	Discus throw	45.07 m
2018	European Championships	Berlin, Germany	16th (q)	Discus throw	55.52 m
2019	European Throwing Cup (U23)	Šamorín, Slovakia	1st	Discus throw	57.76 m
2019	European U23 Championships	Gävle, Sweden	1st	Discus throw	62.76 m
2019	World Championships	Doha, Qatar	–	Discus throw	NM
2021	European U23 Championships	Tallinn, Estonia	5th	Discus throw	53.62 m
2021	Olympic Games	Tokyo, Japan	13th (q)	Discus throw	61.48 m
2022	Mediterranean Games	Oran, Algeria	1st	Discus throw	64.71 m PB
2022	World Championships	Eugene, United States	8th	Discus throw	63.07 m
2022	European Championships	Munich, Germany	6th	Discus throw	63.37 m
2023	World Championships	Budapest, Hungary	18th (q)	Discus throw	58.92 m
2024	European Championships	Rome, Italy	8th	Discus throw	61.42 m
2024	Olympic Games	Paris, France	23rd (q)	Discus throw	59.87 m
2025	World Championships	Tokyo, Japan	14th (q)	Discus throw	61.80 m
2026	European Championships	Birmingham, United Kingdom	6th	Discus throw	63.08 m
2026	Mediterranean Games	Taranto, Italy	4th	Discus throw	58.23 m
