= Vanessa Kamga =

Swedish discus thrower (born 1998)

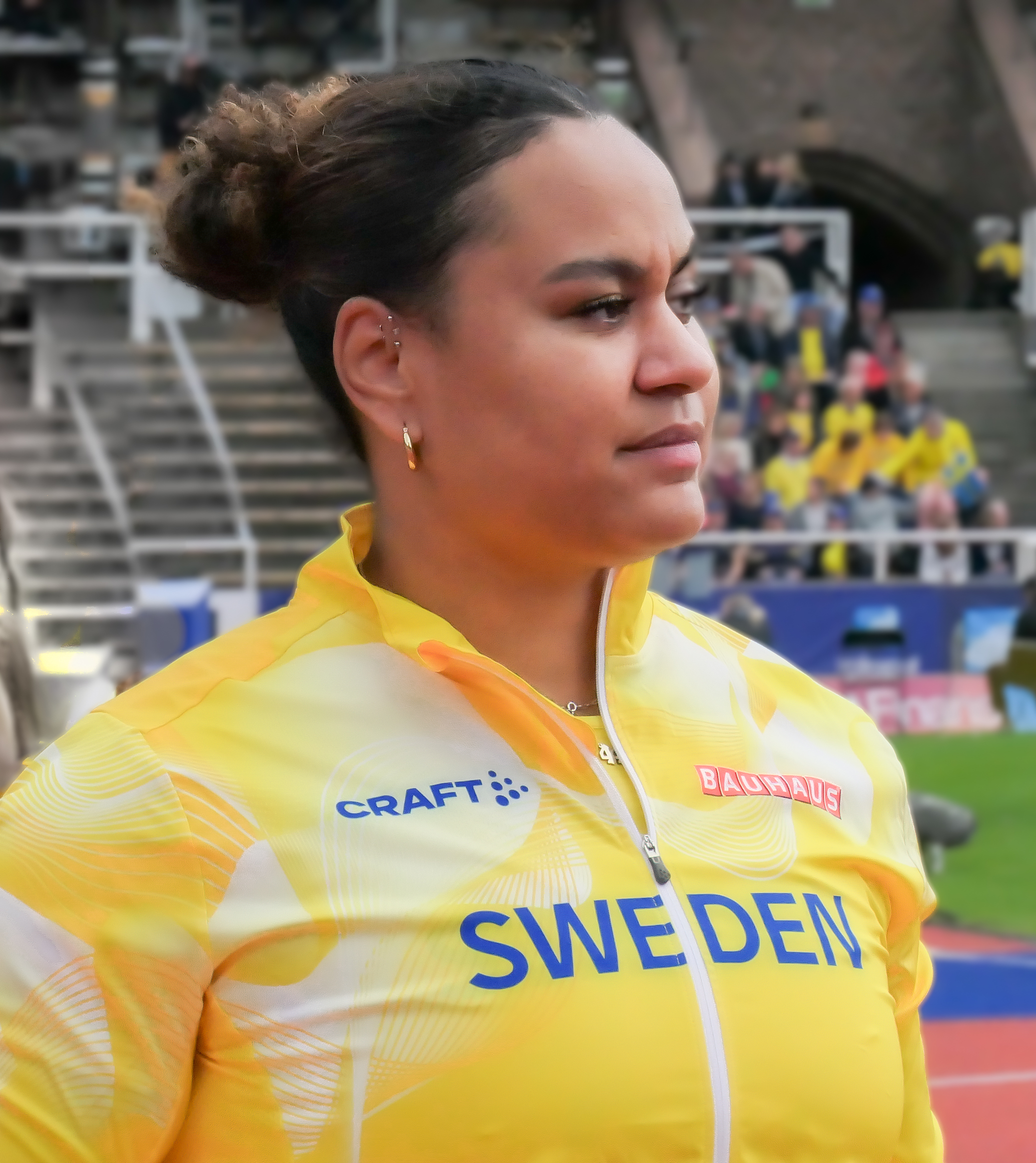
- Kamga in 2023

Personal information
- Born: 19 November 1998 (age 27)

Sport
- Sport: Athletics
- Event: Discus throw
- Club: Upsala IF
Medal record
Women's athletics
Representing Sweden
European Championships
Bronze medal – third place	2026 Birmingham	Discus throw
European Throwing Cup
Gold medal – first place	2025 Nicosia	Discus Throw

Vanessa Kamga (born 19 November 1998) is a Swedish athlete specialising in the discus throw, in which she holds the national record. She represented her country at the 2024 Summer Olympics in Paris, France, where she placed fifth in the final.

Her personal best is 66.61 m (218 ft 6 1/4 in), set at the 2025 World Championships in Tokyo, Japan on 14 September 2025. The result earned her a fourth-place finish in the final.

Kamga won the bronze medal at the 2026 European Championships in Birmingham, England.

== Personal life ==
Kamga was born to a Swedish mother and a Cameroonian father. Her sister is hammer thrower Patricia Kamga.

== International competitions ==
Year	Competition	Venue	Position	Event	Notes
Representing Sweden
2017	European U20 Championships	Grosseto, Italy	20th (q)	Shot put	13.67 m
2017	European U20 Championships	Grosseto, Italy	11th	Discus throw	45.07 m
2018	European Throwing Cup (U23)	Leiria, Portugal	4th	Discus throw	51.94 m
2018	European Championships	Berlin, Germany	18th (q)	Discus throw	54.88 m
2019	European Throwing Cup (U23)	Šamorín, Slovakia	2nd	Discus throw	57.73 m
2019	European U23 Championships	Gävle, Sweden	5th	Discus throw	55.48 m
2019	World Championships	Doha, Qatar	24th (q)	Discus throw	55.87 m
2022	European Championships	Munich, Germany	25th (q)	Discus throw	51.66 m
2023	World Championships	Budapest, Hungary	13th (q)	Discus throw	60.02 m
2024	European Championships	Rome, Italy	9th	Discus throw	60.62 m
2024	Olympic Games	Paris, France	5th	Discus throw	65.05 m
2025	World Championships	Tokyo, Japan	4th	Discus throw	66.61 m
2026	European Championships	Birmingham, United Kingdom	3rd	Discus throw	64.61 m
