= Yerilda Zapata =

Venezuelan athlete (born 1998)

Personal information
- Born: Yerilda Alexandra Zapata Rodríguez; 3 January 1998 (age 28) Puerto la Cruz, Venezuela

Sport
- Country: Venezuela
- Sport: Athletics
- Event: Discus throw
- Team: Deportivo Anzoátegui Sport Club
- Coached by: Ramón Salazar

Achievements and titles
- Personal best(s): 48.61 m (León, 2020)

Yerilda Alexandra Zapata Rodríguez (born 3 January 1998) is a Venezuelan athlete who specializes in discus throw. She set the Venezuelan national junior records in both discus and shot put.

== Early life ==
Yerilda Alexandra Zapata Rodríguez was born in Anzoátegui, Venezuela, on 3 January 1998 to Yuliesy Rodríguez and former boxer Pedro Zapata. She was raised in a ranchito (shack, lit. 'little ranch') in the Altavista area (compared to a favela) of Pozuelos, near Puerto la Cruz, where her father worked in the oil industry. She is one of six siblings, and her elder half-sister is triple jumper Yulimar Rojas. She has been trained by Ramón Salazar since 2008.

== Career ==
Zapata competed in discus and shot put at the 2011 South American School Games, where she won the gold medal in discus with a throw of 35.24 m (115 ft 7 1/4 in), and the silver medal in shot with a put of 13.82 m (45 ft 4 in). At the 2012 Venezuelan School Games, Zapata competed in the U14 discus and javelin. In the former event she won gold with a throw of 33.72 m (110 ft 7 1/2 in), and in the latter she took silver with a 30.80 m (101 ft 1/2 in) throw.

In the U17 special of the South American Championships in Athletics in July 2014, which was also the South American qualifiers for the 2015 World Youth Championships in Athletics, Zapata took the gold in discus with a throw of 42.94 m (140 ft 10 1/2 in).

She then competed in both discus and 8 × 100 metres relay at the 2014 Summer Youth Olympics, and discus at the 2015 World Youth Championships, throwing a personal best of 44.80 m (146 ft 11 3/4 in). She came second at the 2015 Central American and Caribbean School Games, throwing 42.72 m (140 ft 1 3/4 in) in the discus, and took bronze at the 2016 Ibero-American Junior Championships in Athletics.

She won the gold in discus at the 2017, 2018 and 2019 Venezuelan National Championships. In August 2020 she participated in a Royal Spanish Athletics Federation control event in León, Spain, winning the women's discus with a best distance of 48.61 m (159 ft 5 3/4 in).

Zapata's ambition is to go to the Olympic Games and, with Rojas, become the first siblings to win medals for Venezuela, something which Rojas has also expressed a desire to achieve.

== Personal bests ==
- Shot put: 12.60 m (41 ft 4 in) (2017)
- Shot put (3 kg): 14.10 m (46 ft 3 in) (2015)
- Discus throw: 48.61 m (159 ft 5 3/4 in) (2020)

== Records held ==
- Venezuelan junior record in women's discus throw (since 2015)
- Venezuelan junior record in women's shot put (since 2015)
