= Inés López =

Spanish athlete (born 2003)

Inés López Arias
Personal information
- Born: 19 August 2003 (age 23)

Sport
- Sport: Athletics
- Event: Discus throw

Achievements and titles
- Personal bests: Discus: 61.45 m (Birmingham, 2026) NU23R; Shot put: 16.04 m (Lubbock, 2025)
Medal record
Women's athletics
Representing Spain
European U23 Championships
Gold medal – first place	2025 Bergen	Discus

Inés López Arias (born 19 August 2003) is a Spanish discus thrower and shot putter. She became Spanish national champion in the discus throw in 2024 and 2025, and won the discus throw at the 2025 European Athletics U23 Championships.

== Biography ==
In May 2024, she improved her personal best for the discus throw by four metres, throwing 57.43 metres in Fayetteville, Arkansas. The mark would have set a new Spanish under-23 record, but almost simultaneously her compatriot Nneka Naomey Ezenwa had thrown a few inches further in competition in Spain. She later improved her personal best to 55.77 metres to move to seventh on the Spanish all-time list and subsequently won the senior Spanish Athletics Championships in La Nucia, Alicante in June 2024.

At the 2025 European Throwing Cup in Nicosia, Cyprus she improved her Spanish under-23 record by 16 centimetres, throwing 55.93 metres. At the same championships, she finished foutth in the U23 shot put with a best attempt of 15.72m. Competing for Arizona State University she qualified for the 2025 NCAA Championships. She competed for Spain at the 2025 European Athletics Team Championships First Division in Madrid in June 2025.

She won the gold medal for Spain competing at the 2025 European Athletics U23 Championships in Bergen, Norway, throwing a national under-23 record of 58.20 metres, having also been the leading qualifier with a distance of 56.35m. She also placed eighth in the shot put final at the championships. The following month, she retained her Spanish national discus title.

Competing in the United States, Lopez threw a personal best 60.57m to lead the discus competition at the NCAA Regionals on 30 May 2026, and qualified for the 2026 NCAA Outdoor Championships. In August, she competed at the 2026 European Athletics Championships in Birmingham, England, in the discus throw, throwing a new personal best of 61.45 metres.

== Personal life ==
She was born in Madrid.
