= Silinda Morales =

Cuban athlete (born 2000)

Personal information
- Full name: Silinda Oneisi Morales Zenea
- Born: 30 August 2000 (age 26) Camagüey, Cuba

Sport
- Country: Cuba
- Sport: Athletics
- Event: Discus throw

Achievements and titles
- Personal best: Discus: 67.25 m (Tokyo, 2025)
Medal record
Women's athletics
Representing Cuba
World Championships
Bronze medal – third place	2025 Tokyo	Discus throw
Central American and Caribbean Games
Gold medal – first place	2026 Santo Domingo	Discus throw
World U20 Championships
Bronze medal – third place	2018 Tampere	Discus throw
World U18 Championships
Gold medal – first place	2017 Nairobi	Discus throw
Junior Pan American Games
Gold medal – first place	2021 Cali-Valle	Discus throw

Silinda Oneisi Morales Zenea (Note: In this Spanish name, the first or paternal surname is Morales and the second or maternal family name is Zenea.) (born 30 August 2000) is a Cuban discus thrower. She won the bronze medal at the 2025 World Championships and was world under-18 champion in 2017.

== Biography ==
Morales won the discus throw at the 2017 IAAF World U18 Championships in Nairobi, Kenya. The following year, she was a bronze medalist at the 2018 IAAF World U20 Championships in Tampere, Finland.

She won the gold medal at the 2021 Junior Pan American Games in Cali, Colombia.

She was a finalist at the 2023 World Athletics Championships in Budapest, Hungary, placing eleventh overall. She competed for Cuba at the 2024 Olympic Games in Paris, France but did not reach the final.

In September 2025, she competed at the 2025 World Athletics Championships in Tokyo, Japan, reaching the final with a throw of 63.22 metres, before winning the bronze medal with a personal best throw of 67.25 metres.

In August 2026, she won the gold medal in the discus throw at the 2026 CAC Games in Santo Domingo, Dominican Republic.
