= Moldova at the 2011 World Championships in Athletics =

- WA code: MDA
- National federation: Federatia de Atletism din Republica Moldova
- Website: www.fam.com.md

in Daegu
- Competitors: 3
- Medals: Gold 0 Silver 0 Bronze 0 Total 0

World Championships in Athletics appearances
- 1993; 1995; 1997; 1999; 2001; 2003; 2005; 2007; 2009; 2011; 2013; 2015; 2017; 2019; 2022; 2023

Moldova competed at the 2011 World Championships in Athletics from August 27 to September 4 in Daegu, South Korea. A team of 3 athletes was announced to represent the country in the event.

== Results ==
=== Men ===
Athlete	Event	Preliminaries		Heats		Semifinals		Final	
Athlete	Event	Time Width Height	Rank	Time Width Height	Rank	Time Width Height	Rank	Time Width Height	Rank
Ion Luchianov	3000 metres steeplechase			8:23.88 SB	15			8:19.69 SB	8

=== Women ===
Athlete	Event	Preliminaries		Heats		Semifinals		Final	
Athlete	Event	Time Width Height	Rank	Time Width Height	Rank	Time Width Height	Rank	Time Width Height	Rank
Zalina Marghieva	Hammer throw	70.09	9					70.27	8
Marina Marghieva	Hammer throw	67.95	17					Did not advance	
