= Athletics at the 2014 Summer Youth Olympics – Girls' discus throw =

Athletics – Girls' discus throw at the II Summer Youth Olympic Games
- Venue: Nanjing Olympic Sports Centre
- Date: August 20–23
- Competitors: 16 from 16 nations

Medalists
1st place, gold medalist(s)		Sun Kangping	China
2nd place, silver medalist(s)		Al'Ona Byelyakova	Ukraine
3rd place, bronze medalist(s)		Lara Kempka	Germany

The girls’ discus throw competition at the 2014 Summer Youth Olympics was held on 20–23 August 2014 in Nanjing Olympic Sports Center.

== Schedule ==
Date	Time	Round
20 August 2014	18:30	Qualification
23 August 2014	20:30	Final

== Results ==
=== Qualification ===
First 50% of the athletes from the Qualification round progress to the A Final and the remaining athletes to the B Final.

Rank	Athlete	1	2	3	4	Result	Notes	Q
1	Al'Ona Byelyakova (UKR)	x	x	50.29	50.89	50.89		FA
2	Amira Mahmoud (EGY)	43.30	47.34	46.61	47.87	47.87		FA
3	Carla Sescu (ROU)	47.40	44.32	46.48	x	47.40		FA
4	Kristina Rakocevic (MNE)	x	45.44	47.28	46.67	47.28		FA
5	Lara Kempka (GER)	47.00	x	x	42.40	47.00		FA
6	Sun Kangping (CHN)	46.57	x	x	44.57	46.57		FA
7	Leandri Geel (RSA)	46.29	44.41	44.23	42.60	46.29		FA
8	Haley Showalter-Stevens (USA)	42.35	x	42.13	43.39	43.39		FA
9	Janell Fullerton (JAM)	x	40.00	43.23	x	43.23		FB
10	Alexandra Kálmán (HUN)	36.03	40.11	40.76	x	40.76		FB
11	Chen Chueh-Yi (TPE)	38.92	35.97	x	36.76	38.92	PB	FB
12	Serena Brown (BAH)	x	38.90	x	36.89	38.90		FB
13	Fatima al-Hosani (UAE)	37.20	x	36.07	36.28	37.20	PB	FB
14	Pimpisa Songnoo (THA)	34.12	36.87	37.04	x	37.04	PB	FB
15	Yerilda Zapata (VEN)	x	x	X	36.90	36.90		FB
16	Mais Barhoum (SYR)	34.29	36.62	x	x	36.62	PB	FB

=== Finals ===
==== Final A ====
Rank	Final Placing	Athlete	1	2	3	4	Result	Notes
1st place, gold medalist(s)	1	Sun Kangping (CHN)	x	50.10	52.79	52.36	52.79	PB
2nd place, silver medalist(s)	2	Al'Ona Byelyakova (UKR)	46.27	x	51.64	51.30	51.64	
3rd place, bronze medalist(s)	3	Lara Kempka (GER)	49.50	x	x	50.70	50.70	
4	4	Kristina Rakocevic (MNE)	44.44	44.55	46.71	47.55	47.55	
5	5	Amira Mahmoud (EGY)	45.83	47.13	46.99	46.09	47.13	
6	6	Leandri Geel (RSA)	45.38	45.07	45.53	46.05	46.05	
7	7	Haley Showalter-Stevens (USA)	41.16	x	x	45.12	45.12	
8	8	Carla Sescu (ROU)	x	44.60	x	39.95	44.60	

==== Final B ====
Rank	Final Placing	Athlete	1	2	3	4	Result	Notes
1	9	Janell Fullerton (JAM)	41.81	42.83	x	43.36	43.36	
2	10	Alexandra Kálmán (HUN)	41.65	40.36	41.61	42.05	42.05	
3	11	Yerilda Zapata (VEN)	34.40	x	40.17	41.86	41.86	
4	12	Serena Brown (BAH)	x	33.07	38.90	38.23	38.90	
5	13	Chen Chueh-Yi (TPE)	36.48	37.23	35.93	37.23	37.23	
6	14	Pimpisa Songnoo (THA)	34.88	37.02	x	x	37.02	
7	15	Fatima al-Hosani (UAE)	x	32.36	x	x	32.36	
		Mais Barhoum (SYR)					DNS	
