= Moldova at the 2022 World Athletics Championships =

- Flag of Moldova
- WA code: MDA

in Eugene, United States 15 July 2022 – 24 July 2022
- Competitors: 5 (2 men and 3 women)
- Medals: Gold 0 Silver 0 Bronze 0 Total 0

World Athletics Championships appearances
- 1993; 1995; 1997; 1999; 2001; 2003; 2005; 2007; 2009; 2011; 2013; 2015; 2017; 2019; 2022; 2023

Moldova competed at the 2022 World Athletics Championships in Eugene, United States, from 15 to 24 July 2022.

== Results ==
Moldova entered 5 athletes.

Key

- Q = Qualified for the next round
- q = Qualified for the next round as a fastest loser or, in field events, by position without achieving the qualifying target
- NR = National record
- PB = Personal best
- SB = Season best
- N/A = Round not applicable for the event

=== Men ===
Athlete	Event	Qualification		Final	
Athlete	Event	Distance	Position	Distance	Position
Serghei Marghiev	Hammer throw	74.17	15	Did not advance	
Andrian Mardare	Javelin throw	80.83	10 q	82.26	7

=== Women ===
Athlete	Event	Qualification		Final	
Athlete	Event	Distance	Position	Distance	Position
Dimitriana Bezede	Shot put	16.99	24	Did not advance	
Alexandra Emilianov	Discus throw	60.67 SB	13	Did not advance	
Zalina Marghieva	Hammer throw	69.73	17	Did not advance	
