= Milina Wepiwé =

German athlete (born 2005)

Personal information
- Nationality: German
- Born: 4 September 2005 (age 20)

Sport
- Sport: Athletics
- Event: Discus throw

Achievements and titles
- Personal best(s): Discus: 59.75 m (Philadelphia, 2025); Shot put: 14.21m (Ithica, 2025)
Medal record
Women's athletics
Representing Germany
European U23 Championships
Bronze medal – third place	2025 Bergen	Discus
European U20 Championships
Silver medal – second place	2023 Jerusalem	Discus

Milina Wepiwé (born 4 September 2005) is a German discus thrower. She was a silver medalist at the 2023 European U20 Championships and a bronze medalist at the 2025 European U23 Championships.

== Career ==
From Wehrheim in Hesse, Wepiwé competed as a youngster as a member of TSG Wehrheim. Wepiwé represented Germany in the discus throw at the 2022 European Athletics U18 Championships in Jerusalem, Israel.

Wepiwé won the silver medal in the discus throw at the 2023 European Athletics U20 Championships in Jerusalem, Israel, behind compatriot Curly Brown, as part of a German clean sweep of the medals in the discus at the championships, with Brown and Lea Bork.

In 2024, in her first year as a student at Harvard University in the United States, she became the 2024 Ivy League women's discus champion, and then reached the final of the 2024 NCAA Outdoor Championships in the women's discus in Eugene, Oregon, placing seventh overall in the discus with a personal best throw of 59.23 metres. The folllwing year, she improved her personal best to 59.75 metres whilst competing at the Penn Relays.

She won the bronze medal in the discus throw at the 2025 European Athletics U23 Championships in Bergen, Norway, with a throw of 56.82 metres.

== Personal life ==
Her sister Nadjela Wepiwé is also a discus thrower, and won the gold medal at the 2024 European Athletics U18 Championships.
