= Moldova at the 2009 World Championships in Athletics =

- WA code: MDA

in Berlin
- Competitors: 6
- Medals: Gold 0 Silver 0 Bronze 0 Total 0

World Championships in Athletics appearances
- 1993; 1995; 1997; 1999; 2001; 2003; 2005; 2007; 2009; 2011; 2013; 2015; 2017; 2019; 2022; 2023

Moldova competed at the 2009 World Championships in Athletics from 15 to 23 August in Berlin.

== Team selection ==
Track and road events

Event	Athletes	
Event	Men	Women
800 metres		Olga Cristea
3000 m steeplechase	Ion Luchianov	Oxana Juravel

Field and combined events

Event	Athletes	
Event	Men	Women
Triple jump	Vladimir Letnicov	
Hammer throw		Marina Marghiev; Zalina Marghieva

== Results ==
=== Men ===
Track and road events

Event	Athletes	Heats		Final	
Event	Athletes	Result	Rank	Result	Rank
3000 m steeplechase	Ion Luchianov	8:27.41	18	did not advance	

Field and combined events

Event	Athletes	Qualification		Final	
Event	Athletes	Result	Rank	Result	Rank
Triple jump	Vladimir Letnicov	15.88	40	did not advance	

=== Women ===
Track and road events

Event	Athletes	Heats		Semifinal		Final	
Event	Athletes	Result	Rank	Result	Rank	Result	Rank
800 m	Olga Cristea	2:03.99	23	did not advance			
3000 m steeplechase	Oxana Juravel	9:36.63 NR	21	-		did not advance	

Field and combined events

Event	Athletes	Qualification		Final	
Event	Athletes	Result	Rank	Result	Rank
Hammer throw	Marina Marghiev	64.83	33	did not advance	
Hammer throw	Zalina Marghieva	66.70	26	did not advance	
