= Moldova at the 2017 World Championships in Athletics =

- WA code: MDA
- Website: fam.com.md

in London
- Competitors: 5 in 4 events
- Medals: Gold 0 Silver 0 Bronze 0 Total 0

World Championships in Athletics appearances
- 1993; 1995; 1997; 1999; 2001; 2003; 2005; 2007; 2009; 2011; 2013; 2015; 2017; 2019; 2022; 2023

Moldova competed at the 2017 World Championships in Athletics in London, United Kingdom, from 4 to 13 August 2017.

== Results ==
(q – qualified, NM – no mark, SB – season best)

=== Men ===
Field events

Athlete	Event	Qualification		Final	
Athlete	Event	Distance	Position	Distance	Position
Andrian Mardare	Javelin throw	80.18	17	Did not advance	
Serghei Marghiev	Hammer throw	75.18	9 q	75.87	8

=== Women ===
Field events

Athlete	Event	Qualification		Final	
Athlete	Event	Distance	Position	Distance	Position
Dimitriana Surdu	Shot put	17.37	19	Did not advance	
Marina Nichișenco	Hammer throw	64.63	27	Did not advance	
Zalina Petrivskaya	Hammer throw	67.05	19	Did not advance	
