= Kristina Rakočević =

Montenegrin discus thrower

Personal information
- Born: 13 June 1998 (age 27)
- Height: 1.91 m (6 ft 3 in)
- Weight: 103 kg (227 lb)

Sport
- Sport: Athletics
- Event: Discus throw

Kristina Rakočević (born 13 June 1998) is a Montenegrin athlete specialising in the discus throw. She won a gold medal at the 2016 World U20 Championships.

Her personal best in the discus is 58.30 metres set in Split in 2016. This is the current national record as is her shot put best of 15.38 metres (Bar 2015).

== International competitions ==
Year	Competition	Venue	Position	Event	Notes
Representing Montenegro
2013	European Youth Olympic Festival	Utrecht, Netherlands	2nd	Shot put (3 kg)	15.79 m
2013	European Youth Olympic Festival	Utrecht, Netherlands	1st	Discus throw	46.49 m
2014	World Junior Championships	Eugene, United States	11th	Discus throw	49.44 m
2014	Youth Olympic Games	Nanjing, China	4th	Discus throw	47.55 m
2015	World Youth Championships	Cali, Colombia	3rd	Shot put (3 kg)	17.49 m
2015	World Youth Championships	Cali, Colombia	2nd	Discus throw	51.41 m
2016	Championships of the Small States of Europe	Marsa, Malta	2nd	Discus throw	54.07 m
2016	World U20 Championships	Bydgoszcz, Poland	1st	Discus throw	56.36 m
2016	European Championships	Amsterdam, Netherlands	21st (q)	Discus throw	54.35 m
2017	Games of the Small States of Europe	Serravalle, San Marino	3rd	Shot put	14.56 m
2017	Games of the Small States of Europe	Serravalle, San Marino	1st	Discus throw	53.79 m
2017	European U20 Championships	Grosseto, Italy	3rd	Discus throw	53.56 m
2018	Mediterranean U23 Championships	Jesolo, Italy	2nd	Discus throw	55.11 m
2018	Mediterranean Games	Tarragona, Spain	8th	Discus throw	56.20 m
2018	European Championships	Berlin, Germany	13th (q)	Discus throw	55.90 m
2019	Games of the Small States of Europe	Bar, Montenegro	1st	Shot put	15.44 m
2019	Games of the Small States of Europe	Bar, Montenegro	2nd	Discus throw	52.94 m
2019	European U23 Championships	Gävle, Sweden	6th	Discus throw	54.43 m
2022	Championships of the Small States of Europe	Marsa, Malta	2nd	Discus throw	49.67 m
