= 2015 World Youth Championships in Athletics =

- Host city: Cali, Colombia
- Events: 40
- Dates: 15–19 July
- Main venue: Estadio Pascual Guerrero

The 2015 World Youth Championships in Athletics was the ninth edition of the biennial international athletics competition for youth (under-18) athletes. The five-day competition took place between 15 and 19 July at the Estadio Olímpico Pascual Guerrero stadium in Cali, Colombia. Eligible athletes were aged 16 or 17 on 31 December 2015 (born in 1998 or 1999).

== Medal summary ==
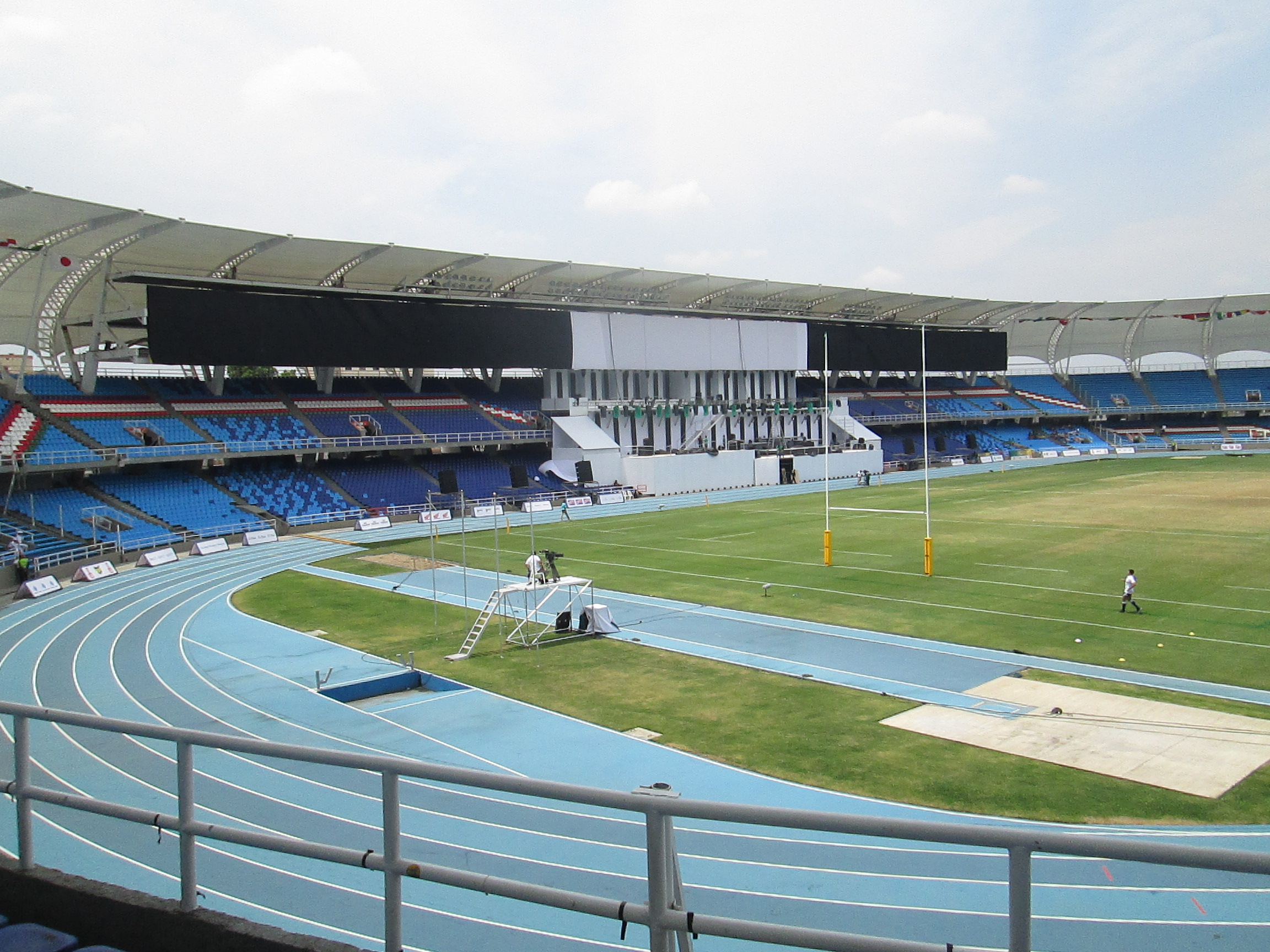
The host stadium in Cali

=== Boys ===
Event	Gold		Silver		Bronze	
100 metres	Abdul Hakim Sani Brown; Japan	10.28; CR	Derick Silva; Brazil	10.49	Rechmial Miller; Great Britain	10.59
200 metres	Abdul Hakim Sani Brown; Japan	20.34; CR	Kyle Appel; South Africa	20.57; PB	Josephus Lyles; United States	20.74; PB
400 metres	Christopher Taylor; Jamaica	45.27; WYL	Josephus Lyles; United States	45.46; PB	Keshun Reed; United States	45.96
800 metres	Willy Tarbei; Kenya	1:45.58	Kipyegon Bett; Kenya	1:45.86	Luis Fernando Pires; Brazil	1:48.61; PB
1500 metres	Kumari Taki; Kenya	3:36.38; CR	Mulugeta Assefa; Ethiopia	3:41.10; PB	Lawi Kosgei; Kenya	3:41.43
3000 metres	Richard Yator Kimunyan; Kenya	7:54.45	Davis Kiplangat; Kenya	7:54.52	Tefera Mosisa; Ethiopia	7:55.04; PB
110 metres hurdles	Mattéo Ngo; France	13.53; PB	Joseph Daniels; Canada	13.54	Isaiah Lucas; United States	13.54
400 metres hurdles	Norman Grimes; United States	49.11; WYL	Ryusei Fujii; Japan	50.33; PB	Masaki Toyoda; Japan	50.53; PB
2000 metres steeplechase	Vincent Kipyegon Ruto; Kenya	5:27.58	Wogene Sebisibe; Ethiopia	5:29.41; PB	Geofrey Rotich; Kenya	5:30.16; PB
10,000 metres walk	Sergey Shirobokov; Russia	42.24.41	Zhang Jun; China	42.33.68; PB	Federico González; Mexico	42.54.55
High jump	Stefano Sottile; Italy	2.20; WYL	Dmytro Nikitin; Ukraine	2.18; PB	Darius Carbin; United States	2.16; PB
Pole vault	Armand Duplantis; Sweden	5.30; CR	Vladyslav Malykhin; Ukraine	5.30; CR	Emmanouil Karalis; Greece	5.20
Long jump	Maykel Massó; Cuba	8.05; CR	Darcy Roper; Australia	8.01PB	Eberson Silva; Brazil	7.76; PB
Triple jump	Cristian Nápoles; Cuba	16.13	Du Mingze; China	16.02; PB	Julio César Carbonell; Cuba	15.70
Shot put	Adrian Piperi; United States	22.00; WYL	Szymon Mazur; Poland	21.77; PB	Wictor Petersson; Sweden	21.56; PB
Discus throw	Werner Visser; South Africa	64.24	Wang Yuhan; China	60.33; PB	George Evans; Great Britain	60.22
Hammer throw	Hlib Piskunov; Ukraine	84.91; CR	Mykhaylo Havryliuk; Ukraine	78.93; PB	Ned Weatherly; Australia	77.60
Javelin throw	Paul Botha; South Africa	78.49; PB	Niklas Kaul; Germany	78.05	Vladislav Palyunin; Uzbekistan	76.77
Decathlon	Niklas Kaul; Germany	8002; WYB	Ludovic Besson; France	7678; PB	Hans-Christian Hausenberg; Estonia	7657

=== Girls ===
Event	Gold		Silver		Bronze	
100 metres	Candace Hill; United States	11.08; CR	Khalifa St.Fort; Trinidad and Tobago	11.19; PB	Jayla Kirkland; United States	11.41; PB
200 metres	Candace Hill; United States	22.43; WYB	Lauren Rain Williams; United States	22.90; PB	Nicola De Bruyn; South Africa	23.38; PB
400 metres	Salwa Eid Naser; Bahrain	51.50; WYL	Lynna Irby; United States	51.79; PB	Catherine Reid; Great Britain	52.25; PB
800 metres	Samantha Watson; United States	2:03.54; PB	Gadese Ejara; Ethiopia	2:03.67; PB	Marta Zenoni; Italy	2:04.15
1500 metres	Bedatu Hirpa; Ethiopia	4:12.92; WYL	Dalila Abdulkadir Gosa; Bahrain	4:13.35; PB	Joyline Cherotich; Kenya	4:15.20; PB
3000 metres	Shuru Bulo; Ethiopia	9:01.12; WYL	Emily Chebet Kipchumba; Kenya	9:02.92; PB	Sheila Chelangat; Kenya	9:04.54; PB
100 metres hurdles	Maribel Caicedo; Ecuador	13.04; PB	Brittley Humphrey; United States	13.22; PB	Sarah Koutouan; France	13.29
400 metres hurdles	Sydney McLaughlin; United States	55.94; CR	Xahria Santiago; Canada	56.79; PB	Brandeé Johnson; United States	57.47; PB
2000 metres steeplechase	Celliphine Chepteek Chespol; Kenya	6:17.15; PB	Sandrafelis Chebet Tuei; Kenya	6:19.61	Agrie Belachew; Ethiopia	6:34.68
5000 metres walk	Ma Zhenxia; China	22:41.08; SB	Olga Eliseeva; Russia	22:45.09	Ayalnesh Dejene; Ethiopia	22:48.25; PB
High jump	Michaela Hrubá; Czech Republic	1.90	Ieva Turke; Latvia	1.82; PB	Lada Pejchalová; Czech Republic	1.82
Pole vault	Elienor Werner; Sweden	4.26; WYL	Phillipa Hajdasz; Australia	4.05; PB	Not awarded	
Pole vault	Elienor Werner; Sweden	4.26; WYL	Chen Qiaoling; China	4.05; PB	Not awarded	
Long jump	Tara Davis; United States	6.41; PB	Kaiza Karlén; Sweden	6.24; PB	Maja Bedrac; Slovenia	6.22
Triple jump	Georgiana Iuliana Anitei; Romania	13.49; WYL	Zeng Rui; China	13.04; PB	Yanna Anay Armenteros; Cuba	13.04
Shot put	Julia Ritter; Germany	18.53; PB	Sophia Rivera; United States	17.93	Kristina Rakočević; Montenegro	17.49
Discus throw	Alexandra Emilianov; Moldova	52.78; PB	Kristina Rakočević; Montenegro	51.41	Samantha Peace; Australia	50.59; PB
Hammer throw	Sofiya Palkina; Russia	67.82	Deniz Yaylacı; Turkey	67.01; PB	Shang Ningyu; China	66.84; PB
Javelin throw	Haruka Kitaguchi; Japan	60.35; PB	Stella Weinberg; Norway	57.11; PB	Laine Donane; Latvia	56.15
Heptathlon	Géraldine Ruckstuhl; Switzerland	6037; CR	Sarah Lagger; Austria	5992	Alina Shukh; Ukraine	5896

=== Mixed ===
Event	Gold		Silver		Bronze	
Mixed 4 × 400 metres relay	United States; Keshun Reed; Lynna Irby; Norman Grimes; Samantha Watson	3:19.54	South Africa; André Nicholas Marich; Renate Van Tonder; Taylon Bieldt; Kyle Appel	3:23.60	Canada; Nathan Friginette; Ashlan Best; Dean Ellenwood; Kyra Constantine	3:23.60

== Medal table ==
* Host nation (Colombia)

Rank	Nation	Gold	Silver	Bronze	Total
1	United States (USA)	8	5	6	19
2	Kenya (KEN)	5	4	4	13
3	Japan (JPN)	3	1	1	5
4	Ethiopia (ETH)	2	3	3	8
5	South Africa (RSA)	2	2	1	5
6	Sweden (SWE)	2	1	1	4
7	Germany (GER)	2	1	0	3
7	Russia (RUS)	2	1	0	3
9	Cuba (CUB)	2	0	2	4
10	China (CHN)	1	5	1	7
11	Ukraine (UKR)	1	3	1	5
12	France (FRA)	1	1	1	3
13	Bahrain (BHR)	1	1	0	2
14	Czech Republic (CZE)	1	0	1	2
14	Italy (ITA)	1	0	1	2
16	Ecuador (ECU)	1	0	0	1
16	Jamaica (JAM)	1	0	0	1
16	Moldova (MDA)	1	0	0	1
16	Romania (ROU)	1	0	0	1
16	Switzerland (SUI)	1	0	0	1
21	Australia (AUS)	0	2	2	4
22	Canada (CAN)	0	2	1	3
23	Brazil (BRA)	0	1	2	3
24	Latvia (LAT)	0	1	1	2
24	Montenegro (MNE)	0	1	1	2
26	Austria (AUT)	0	1	0	1
26	Norway (NOR)	0	1	0	1
26	Poland (POL)	0	1	0	1
26	Trinidad and Tobago (TTO)	0	1	0	1
26	Turkey (TUR)	0	1	0	1
31	Great Britain (GBR)	0	0	3	3
32	Estonia (EST)	0	0	1	1
32	Greece (GRE)	0	0	1	1
32	Mexico (MEX)	0	0	1	1
32	Slovenia (SLO)	0	0	1	1
32	Uzbekistan (UZB)	0	0	1	1
37	Colombia (COL)*	0	0	0	0
Totals (37 entries)		39	40	38	117
