= Liechtenstein Association of Athletics Federations =

Sport governing body in Liechtenstein

- Liechtensteiner Leichtathletikverband
- Sport: Athletics
- Jurisdiction: Liechtenstein
- Abbreviation: LLV
- Affiliation: World Athletics
- Regional affiliation: EAA and AASSE
- Headquarters: Ruggell
- President: René Michlig
- Secretary: Daniela Ospelt

Official website
- www.athletics.li
- (Liechtenstein)

The Liechtenstein Association of Athletics Federations (German: Liechtensteiner Leichtathletikverband) is the governing body for the sport of athletics in Liechtenstein.

== Affiliations ==
- World Athletics
- European Athletic Association (EAA)
- Liechtensteinian Olympic Committee

== National records ==
LLV maintains the Liechtensteinian records in athletics.
