= Liechtenstein at the 2012 European Athletics Championships =

Liechtenstein competed at the 2012 European Athletics Championships held in Helsinki, Finland, between 27 June to 1 July 2012. 1 competitor, 1 man took part in 2 events.

== Results ==
=== Men ===
Track events

Event	Athletes	Heat		Semifinal		Final	
Event	Athletes	Result	Rank	Result	Rank	Result	Rank
200 m	Fabian Haldner	23.32	30	did not advance			
400 m	Fabian Haldner	50.77	31	did not advance			
