= Liechtenstein at the 2010 European Athletics Championships =

Sporting event delegation

Liechtenstein will be represented by 1 athlete at the 2010 European Athletics Championships held in Barcelona, Spain.

== Participants ==
Event	Men	Women
Marathon	Marcel Tschopp	

== Results ==
2010 Barcelona	Gold	Silver	Bronze	Total
Liechtenstein (LIE)	0	0	0	0
