= Julia Ritter =

German shot putter

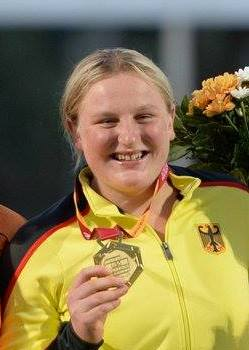
- Ritter in 2017

Personal information
- Born: 13 May 1998 (age 28) Lünen, Germany

Sport
- Country: Germany
- Sport: Athletics
- Event: Shot put

Achievements and titles
- Personal best: Shot put: 17.24 m (2017)

Julia Ritter (born 13 May 1998) is a German female shot putter who won individual gold medals at the 2015 Youth World Championships and at the 2017 European U20 Championships.
