= Amanda Ngandu-Ntumba =

French discus thrower and shot putter (born 2000)

Personal information
- Citizenship: French
- Born: 24 June 2000 (age 25) Juvisy-sur-Orge, France

Sport
- Country: France
- Sport: Discus throw; Shot put
- College team: Cincinnati Bearcats
- Club: Roannais Athletic Club

Achievements and titles
- Regional finals: 2021
- National finals: 2020, 2022 (outdoor); 2022, 2023 (indoor)
Medal record
French Athletics Championships
Gold medal – first place	2020 Albi	Shot put
Gold medal – first place	2022 Caen	Shot put
French Indoor Athletics Championships
Gold medal – first place	2022 Miramas	Shot put
Gold medal – first place	2023 Salon-de-Provence	Discus throw
Representing France
European Athletics U20 Championships
Bronze medal – third place	2019 Borås	Discus throw
European Athletics U23 Championships
Bronze medal – third place	2021 Tallinn	Discus throw

Amanda Ngandu-Ntumba (born 24 June 2000) is a French discus thrower and shot putter, who has won multiple national championships. She came third in the discus throw events at the 2019 European Athletics U20 Championships and the 2021 European Athletics U23 Championships. She also won multiple medals in under-23 events at the 2021 European Throwing Cup.

== Career ==
Ngandu-Ntumba started her athletics career at Coquelicot 42. She now trains at the Roannais Athletic Club (CAR). At the 2019 European Athletics U20 Championships, Ngandu-Ntumba finished third in the discus throw, and qualified for the final of the shot put.

At the 2020 French Athletics Championships, Ngandu-Ntumba won the senior shot put event and the junior discus throw event. She was third in the senior discus throw event. At the 2021 European Throwing Cup, Ngandu-Ntumba came second in the under-23s discus event, and third in the under-23s shot put competition. She finished third in the discus throw event at the 2021 European Athletics U23 Championships; at the time, she was the third ranked French discus thrower, with a personal best of 56 metres (184 ft) with a 1 kilogram (2.2 lb) discus.

In 2022, Ngandu-Ntumba both won the French indoor and outdoor national shot put titles again, and that year, she competed at the 2022 European Athletics Championships. She won the French indoor discus throw competition at the 2023 French Indoor Athletics Championships.

In the 2024/25 season, Ngandu-Ntumba competed in college athletics for the Cincinnati Bearcats. She qualified for the 2025 NCAA Division I Outdoor Track and Field Championships in the shot put event after setting a school record of 16.85m in the qualification event. She also qualified for the discus event at the same championships.

== Personal life ==
Ngandu-Ntumba was born in Juvisy-sur-Orge, France, and grew up in Saint-Étienne. As a youngster, she participated in swimming and basketball. Aside from athletics, she has studied for an international business degree.
