= Roman Prodius =

Moldovan long-distance runner (born 1981)

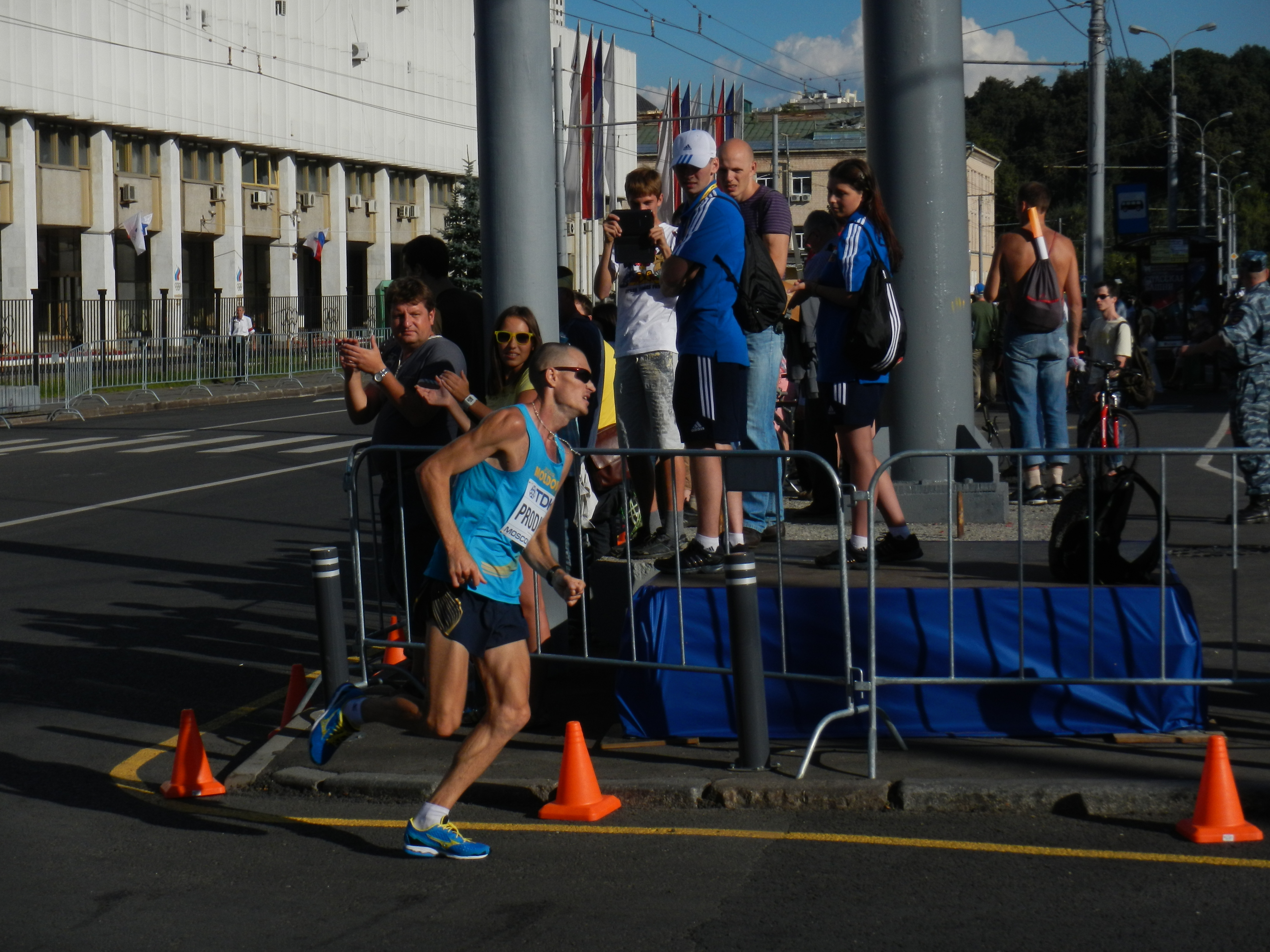

Personal information
- Born: April 12, 1981 (age 44)
- Height: 1.81 m (5 ft 11 1/2 in)
- Weight: 69 kg (152 lb)

Sport
- Country: Moldova
- Sport: Athletics
- Event: Marathon

Roman Prodius (born 12 April 1981) is a Moldovan long-distance runner. At the 2012 Summer Olympics, he competed in the Men's marathon, but did not finish.
