= Moldova at the 2010 European Athletics Championships =

Sporting event delegation

Moldova was represented by 6 athletes at the 2010 European Athletics Championships held in Barcelona, Spain.

== Participants ==
Event	Men	Women
800 m		Olga Cristea
3000 st.	Ion Luchianov	Oxana Juravel
High Jump		Marina Marghiev; Zalina Marghieva
Triple Jump	Vladimir Letnicov	

== Results ==
2010 Barcelona	Gold	Silver	Bronze	Total
Moldova (MDA)	0	0	1	1
