= Athletics Federation of Moldova =

Sports governing body in Moldova

- Sport: Athletics
- Abbreviation: FAM
- Founded: 1991
- Affiliation: World Athletics
- Regional affiliation: EAA
- Headquarters: Chișinău
- President: Anatolie Bălan
- Secretary: Constantin Negura

Official website
- fam.com.md
- (Moldova)

The Athletics Federation of Moldova (Romanian: Federația de Atletism din Republica Moldova) is the governing body for the sport of athletics in Moldova.

== Affiliations ==
- World Athletics
- European Athletic Association (EAA)
- National Olympic Committee of the Republic of Moldova

== National records ==
FAM maintains the Moldovan records in athletics.
