= Moldova at the 2012 European Athletics Championships =

Moldova competed at the 2012 European Athletics Championships held in Helsinki, Finland, between 27 June to 1 July 2012. 6 competitors, 2 men and 4 women took part in 5 events.

== Results ==
=== Men ===
Track events

Event	Athletes	Heat		Semifinal		Final	
Event	Athletes	Result	Rank	Result	Rank	Result	Rank
3000 m steeplechase	Ion Luchianov	8:29.28	2 Q	—		8:42.06	11

Field events

Event	Athletes	Qualification		Final	
Event	Athletes	Result	Rank	Result	Rank
Long jump	Alexandru Cuharenco	7.79	20	did not advance	

=== Women ===
Track events

Event	Athletes	Heat		Semifinal		Final	
Event	Athletes	Result	Rank	Result	Rank	Result	Rank
400 m	Olessa Cojuhari	53.52	18	did not advance			

Field events

Event	Athletes	Qualification		Final	
Event	Athletes	Result	Rank	Result	Rank
Discus throw	Natalia Artîc	57.42	9 q	58.64	8
Hammer throw	Zalina Marghieva	69.86	2 q	67.92	8
Hammer throw	Marina Marghiev	65.44	15	did not advance	
