= Alexandra Emilianov =

Moldovan discus thrower (born 1999)

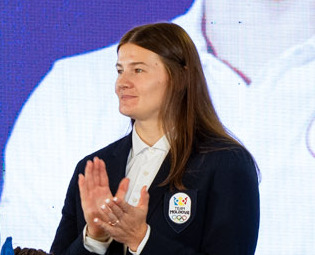
- Emilianov in 2024

Personal information
- Born: 19 September 1999 (age 26) Chișinău, Moldova
- Height: 1.84 m (6 ft 0 in)
- Weight: 94 kg (207 lb)

Sport
- Country: Moldova
- Sport: Athletics
- Event: Discus throw
- Club: Kansas

Achievements and titles
- Personal best: Discus throw: 64.42m (2024)

Alexandra "Sasha" Emilianov (born 19 September 1999) is a Moldovan female discus thrower, who won an individual gold medal at the 2015 Youth World Championships and at the 2018 IAAF World U20 Championships.

Emilianov was an All-American discus thrower for the Kansas Jayhawks track and field team, finishing runner-up in the discus at the 2022 NCAA Division I Outdoor Track and Field Championships.

She competed for Moldova at the 2020 Summer Olympics and 2024 Summer Olympics.
